= Alpine skiing at the 1952 Winter Olympics – Men's giant slalom =

Men's giant slalom at the VI Olympic Winter Games
- Alpine skiing
- Venue: Norefjell Ski Resort, Krødsherad, Norway
- Date: 15 February 1952
- Competitors: 83 from 26 nations
- Winning time: 3:00.1

Medalists
1st place, gold medalist(s)		Stein Eriksen	Norway
2nd place, silver medalist(s)		Christian Pravda	Austria
3rd place, bronze medalist(s)		Toni Spiß	Austria

The men's alpine skiing giant slalom event was part of the alpine skiing at the 1952 Winter Olympics programme. It was the first appearance of the event at the Olympics. The competition was held on Friday, 15 February 1952 at Norefjell ski area and started at 1 p.m.

Eighty-three alpine skiers from 26 nations competed.

== Results ==
Friday, 15 February 1952

Rank	Bib #	Competitor	Time	Difference
1st place, gold medalist(s)	12	Stein Eriksen (NOR)	2:25.0	—
2nd place, silver medalist(s)	11	Christian Pravda (AUT)	2:26.9	+1.9
3rd place, bronze medalist(s)	6	Toni Spiß (AUT)	2:28.8	+3.8
4	1	Zeno Colò (ITA)	2:29.1	+4.1
5	7	Georges Schneider (SUI)	2:31.2	+6.2
6	10	Stig Sollander (SWE)	2:32.6	+7.2
6	36	Brooks Dodge (USA)	2:32.6	+7.2
8	16	Bernhard Perren (SUI)	2:33.1	+8.1
9	9	Hans Senger (AUT)	2:33.6	+8.6
10	15	Gunnar Hjeltnes (NOR)	2:33.7	+8.7
11	2	Fernand Grosjean (SUI)	2:33.8	+8.8
12	13	Fredy Rubi (SUI)	2:34.0	+9.0
13	4	Guttorm Berge (NOR)	2:34.5	+9.5
14	8	James Couttet (FRA)	2:34.9	+9.9
15	17	Guy de Huertas (FRA)	2:35.1	+10.1
16	22	Henri Oreiller (FRA)	2:35.3	+10.3
17	30	Pepi Schwaiger (GER)	2:35.4	+10.4
18	5	Carlo Gartner (ITA)	2:35.7	+10.7
19	26	Alf Opheim (NOR)	2:35.9	+10.9
20	39	Chiharu Igaya (JPN)	2:36.1	+11.1
21	42	Åke Nilsson (SWE)	2:37.0	+12.0
22	19	Silvio Alverà (ITA)	2:37.7	+12.7
23	3	Maurice Sanglard (FRA)	2:38.0	+13.0
24	18	Jack Reddish (USA)	2:39.5	+14.5
24	20	Roberto Lacedelli (ITA)	2:39.5	+14.5
26	40	Hisashi Mizugami (JPN)	2:40.1	+15.1
27	25	Tine Mulej (YUG)	2:41.3	+16.3
28	21	Beni Obermüller (GER)	2:41.4	+16.4
29	35	Jack Nagel (USA)	2:42.0	+17.0
30	41	Sixten Isberg (SWE)	2:42.3	+17.3
31	52	Pentti Alonen (FIN)	2:45.1	+20.1
32	23	Willi Klein (GER)	2:46.2	+21.2
33	47	Janko Štefe (YUG)	2:47.5	+22.5
34	24	Robert Richardson (CAN)	2:48.2	+23.2
35	46	David Lawrence (USA)	2:48.6	+23.6
36	50	André Bertrand (CAN)	2:49.3	+24.3
37	31	John Griffin (CAN)	2:49.9	+24.9
38	32	Stefan Dziedzic (POL)	2:50.3	+25.3
39	63	Jan Płonka (POL)	2:51.5	+26.5
40	38	Francisco Viladomat (ESP)	2:51.6	+26.6
41	29	Andrzej Gąsienica Roj (POL)	2:52.2	+27.2
42	59	Eino Kalpala (FIN)	2:52.3	+27.3
43	33	John Boyagis (GBR)	2:52.5	+27.5
44	81	Niilo Juvonen (FIN)	2:52.8	+27.8
45	48	Mihai Bîră (ROU)	2:53.0	+28.0
46	43	Gordon Morrison (CAN)	2:54.2	+29.2
47	34	Pepi Erben (GER)	2:55.0	+30.0
48	54	Józef Marusarz (POL)	2:55.5	+30.5
49	72	Pablo Rosenkjer (ARG)	2:55.9	+30.9
49	37	John Fredriksson (SWE)	2:55.9	+30.9
51	61	Haukur Sigurðsson (ISL)	2:57.0	+32.0
52	65	Dick Pappenheim (NED)	2:57.6	+32.6
53	51	Georgi Dimitrov (BUL)	2:59.5	+34.5
54	44	Radu Scîrneci (ROU)	3:00.1	+35.1
55	45	Pekka Alonen (FIN)	3:00.2	+35.2
56	57	Luis de Ridder (ARG)	3:00.9	+35.9
57	62	Luis Arias (ESP)	3:01.5	+36.5
57	68	Jón Karl Sigurðsson (ISL)	3:01.5	+36.5
59	53	Dumitru Sulică (ROU)	3:01.7	+36.7
60	49	Juan Poll (ESP)	3:03.5	+38.5
61	74	Otto Jung (ARG)	3:03.7	+38.7
62	70	Luis Molné (ESP)	3:04.9	+39.9
63	85	Ásgeir Eyjólfsson (ISL)	3:06.4	+41.4
64	69	Ștefan Ghiță (ROU)	3:06.7	+41.7
65	71	Georgi Mitrov (BUL)	3:07.4	+42.4
66	76	Gino de Pellegrín (ARG)	3:09.5	+44.5
67	60	Bill Day (AUS)	3:10.5	+45.5
68	78	Stefán Kristjánsson (ISL)	3:12.5	+47.5
69	64	Michel Feron (BEL)	3:14.0	+49.0
70	86	Peter Pappenheim (NED)	3:15.1	+50.1
71	58	Rupert de Larrinaga (GBR)	3:16.9	+51.9
72	55	Dimitar Drazhev (BUL)	3:17.6	+52.6
73	87	Denis Feron (BEL)	3:19.2	+54.2
74	80	Noel Harrison (GBR)	3:24.1	+59.1
75	83	Eduardo Silva (CHI)	3:25.6	+1:00.6
76	66	Jaime Errázuriz (CHI)	3:30.3	+1:05.3
77	56	Herbert Familton (NZL)	3:31.7	+1:06.7
78	75	Bob Arnott (AUS)	3:38.4	+1:13.4
79	67	József Piroska (HUN)	3:39.3	+1:14.3
80	79	Barry Patten (AUS)	3:41.1	+1:16.1
81	84	Bill Hunt (NZL)	3:51.6	+1:26.6
82	85	Ibrahim Geagea (LIB)	3:52.8	+1:27.8
—	14	Egon Schöpf (AUT)	DSQ	
