= Speed skating at the 1952 Winter Olympics – Men's 1500 metres =

Men's 1500 metres speed skating at the VI Olympic Winter Games
- Pictogram for speed skating
- Venue: Bislett Stadium
- Date: 18 February 1952
- Competitors: 39 from 13 nations
- Winning time: 2:20.4

Medalists
1st place, gold medalist(s)		Hjalmar Andersen	Norway
2nd place, silver medalist(s)		Wim van der Voort	Netherlands
3rd place, bronze medalist(s)		Roald Aas	Norway

The 1500 metres speed skating event was part of the speed skating at the 1952 Winter Olympics programme. The competition was held on Monday, 18 February 1952 at 5 p.m. Thirty-nine speed skaters from 13 nations competed.

== Medalists ==
Gold	Silver	Bronze
Hjalmar Andersen; Norway	Wim van der Voort; Netherlands	Roald Aas; Norway

== Records ==
These were the standing world and Olympic records (in minutes) prior to the 1952 Winter Olympics.

World record	2:12.9(*)	(Soviet Union) Valentin Chaikin	Medeo (URS)	20 January 1952
Olympic record	2:17.6(*)	(Norway) Sverre Farstad	St. Moritz (SUI)	2 February 1948

(*) The record was set in a high altitude venue (more than 1000 metres above sea level) and on naturally frozen ice.

== Results ==
The current world record holder Valentin Chaikin did not compete as the Soviet Union did not participate in Winter Games before 1956.

Place	Speed skater	Time
1	Hjalmar Andersen (NOR)	2:20.4
2	Wim van der Voort (NED)	2:20.6
3	Roald Aas (NOR)	2:21.6
4	Carl-Erik Asplund (SWE)	2:22.6
5	Kees Broekman (NED)	2:22.8
6	Lassi Parkkinen (FIN)	2:23.0
7	Kauko Salomaa (FIN)	2:23.3
8	Sigvard Ericsson (SWE)	2:23.4
8	Ivar Martinsen (NOR)	2:23.4
10	Ferenc Lőrincz (HUN)	2:23.7
11	Tsuneo Sato (JPN)	2:23.9
12	Gerard Maarse (NED)	2:24.3
12	Johnny Werket (USA)	2:24.3
14	Norman Holwell (GBR)	2:24.5
15	Nic Stene (NOR)	2:24.8
16	Craig MacKay (CAN)	2:25.0
16	Ken Henry (USA)	2:25.0
18	Pat McNamara (USA)	2:25.5
19	Gunnar Ström (SWE)	2:25.8
20	Franz Offenberger (AUT)	2:25.9
21	József Merényi (HUN)	2:26.1
22	Arthur Mannsbarth (AUT)	2:26.6
23	Masanori Aoki (JPN)	2:26.9
24	Kalevi Laitinen (FIN)	2:27.1
25	Toivo Salonen (FIN)	2:27.4
26	Cockie van der Elst (NED)	2:27.6
26	John Wickström (SWE)	2:27.6
28	Don McDermott (USA)	2:28.8
29	Ralf Olin (CAN)	2:29.3
30	Colin Hickey (AUS)	2:30.4
31	Enrico Musolino (ITA)	2:30.7
32	Guido Citterio (ITA)	2:30.8
33	Sukenobu Kudo (JPN)	2:31.6
34	Kiyotaka Takabayashi (JPN)	2:32.0
35	Bill Jones (GBR)	2:32.2
36	Konrad Pecher (AUT)	2:34.8
37	Robert Laboubée (BEL)	2:36.4
38	John Hearn (GBR)	2:40.1
39	Jean Massez (BEL)	2:43.8
