= Alpine skiing at the 1952 Winter Olympics – Men's slalom =

The men's slalom at the 1952 Winter Olympics was held on Tuesday 19 February at Rødkleiva ski run. The course was very difficult to maintain as the weather was not favorable. The men's course had 52 gates. Since the men's race was scheduled the day before the women's, and there was concern about the condition of the hill, the number of racers was reduced after the first run in compliance with international rules. Twenty-nine athletes finished both runs. Four athletes were disqualified after the first run. Austrian Othmar Schneider won his second Olympic medal, this time gold, after he took the silver in the downhill competition. Norwegians Stein Eriksen and Guttorm Berge placed second and third respectively.

== Results ==
Tuesday, 19 February 1952

Place	Alpine skier	1st run	2nd run	Total	Difference
1st place, gold medalist(s)	Othmar Schneider (AUT)	59.5	1.00.5	2.00.0	—
2nd place, silver medalist(s)	Stein Eriksen (NOR)	59.2	1.02.0	2.01.2	+1.2
3rd place, bronze medalist(s)	Guttorm Berge (NOR)	1.01.1	1.00.6	2.01.7	+1.7
4	Zeno Colò (ITA)	1.00.9	1.00.9	2.01.8	+1.8
5	Stig Sollander (SWE)	1.00.4	1.02.2	2.02.6	+2.6
6	James Couttet (FRA)	1.01.1	1.01.7	2.02.8	+2.8
7	Fredy Rubi (SUI)	1.03.6	59.7	2.03.3	+3.3
8	Per Rollum (NOR)	1.01.6	1.02.9	2.04.5	+4.5
9	Brooks Dodge (USA)	1.01.4	1.03.3	2.04.7	+4.7
10	Franz Bumann (SUI)	1.02.7	1.02.7	2.04.8	+4.8
11	Chiharu Igaya (JPN)	1.02.6	1.03.1	2.05.7	+5.7
12	Firmin Mattis (FRA)	1.02.0	1.04.0	2.06.0	+6.0
13	Benni Obermüller (GER)	1.04.1	1.03.4	2.07.5	+7.5
14	Pekka Alonen (FIN)	1.04.8	1.03.9	2.08.7	+8.7
15	Olle Dalman (SWE)	1.04.3	1.04.5	2.08.8	+8.8
16	Willi Klein (GER)	1.04.2	1.04.7	2.08.9	+8.9
17	Jack Reddish (USA)	1.02.5	1.06.5	2.09.0	+9.0
18	Ake Nilsson (SWE)	1.06.1	1.03.4	2.09.5	+9.5
19	Silvio Alvera (ITA)	1.04.5	1.05.3	2.09.8	+9.8
20	Maurice Sanglard (FRA)	1.01.4	1.08.6	2.10.0	+10.0
21	Bernhard Perren (SUI)	1.03.4	1.01.7*	2.10.1	+10.1
22	Darrell Robison (USA)	1.05.1	1.05.1	2.10.2	+10.2
23	Albino Alvera (ITA)	1.04.7	1.05.7	2.10.4	+10.4
24	John Fredriksson (SWE)	1.06.0	1.05.9	2.11.9	+11.9
25	André Bertrand (CAN)	1.07.0	1.06.2	2.13.2	+13.2
26	Robert Richardson (CAN)	1.06.8	1.07.0	2.13.8	+13.8
27	Asgeir Eyfolfsson (ISL)	1.06.4	1.09.7	2.16.1	+16.1
28	Andrzej Roj Gasienica (POL)	1.06.1	1.23.5	2.29.6	+29.6
29	Christian Pravda (AUT)	1.01.5	1.48.2*	2.54.7	+54.7
–	Hans Senger (AUT)	59.2	DSQ		
–	Janez Stefe (YUG)	1.03.7	DSQ		
–	Jan Ciaptak Gasienica (POL)	1.05.2	DSQ		
–	Georgui Dimitrov (BUL)	1.07.0	DSQ		
34	Jack Griffin (CAN)				
35	Jack Nagel (USA)				
36	Tine Mulej (YUG)				
37	John Boyagis (GBR)				
38	Guy de Huertas (FRA)				
39	Eino Kalpala (FIN)				
40	Jón Karl Sigurðsson (ISL)				
41	George Merry (CAN)				
42	Ermanno Nogler (ITA)				
42	Mihai Bîră (ROU)				
44	Heini Bierling (GER)				
45	Dimitar Drazhev (BUL)				
46	Stefán Kristjánsson (ISL)				
47	Luis Arias (ESP)				
48	Georges Schneider (SUI)				
49	Gunnar Hjeltnes (NOR)				
50	Juan Poll (ESP)				
51	Pentti Alonen (FIN)				
52	Hisashi Mizugami (JPN)				
53	Peppi Schwaiger (GER)				
54	Bill Day (AUS)				
55	Francisco de Ridder (ARG)				
56	Eduardo Silva (CHI)				
57	Ion Coliban (ROU)				
57	Jan Płonka (POL)				
59	Ștefan Ghiță (ROU)				
60	Dimitri Atanasov (BUL)				
61	Francisco Viladomat (ESP)				
62	Jaime Errázuriz (CHI)				
63	Sergio Navarrete (CHI)				
64	Luis de Ridder (ARG)				
65	Denis Feron (BEL)				
65	Bob Arnott (AUS)				
67	Otto Jung (ARG)				
68	Peter Pappenheim (NED)				
69	Georgi Mitrov (BUL)				
70	Pablo Rosenkjer (ARG)				
71	Stefan Dziedzic (POL)				
72	Luis Molné (ESP)				
73	Michel Feron (BEL)				
74	Dick Pappenheim (NED)				
75	Bill Hunt (NZL)				
76	Barry Patten (AUS)				
77	Andrei Kovacs (ROU)				
78	József Piroska (HUN)				
79	Antonios Myliordos (GRE)				
–	Toni Spiß (AUT)	DNF			
–	Niilo Juvonen (FIN)	DNF			
–	Haukur Sigurðsson (ISL)	DNF			
–	Noel Harrison (GBR)	DNF			
–	Ibrahim Geagea (LIB)	DNF			
–	Alexandros Vouxinos (GRE)	DNF			
–	Angelos Lembesi (GRE)	DNF			

* 5 seconds penalty added.

== See also ==
- List of IOC country codes
- 1956 Winter Olympics
