= Speed skating at the 1952 Winter Olympics – Men's 500 metres =

Men's 500 metres speed skating at the VI Olympic Winter Games
- Pictogram for speed skating
- Venue: Bislett Stadium
- Date: 16 February 1952
- Competitors: 49 from 14 nations
- Winning time: 43.2

Medalists
1st place, gold medalist(s)		Ken Henry	United States
2nd place, silver medalist(s)		Don McDermott	United States
3rd place, bronze medalist(s)		Gordon Audley	Canada
3rd place, bronze medalist(s)		Arne Johansen	Norway

The 500 metres speed skating event was part of the speed skating at the 1952 Winter Olympics programme. The competition was held on Saturday, 16 February 1952, at 3 p.m. Forty-one speed skaters from 14 nations competed.

== Medalists ==
Gold	Silver	Bronze
Ken Henry; United States	Don McDermott; United States	Gordon Audley; Canada Arne Johansen; Norway

== Records ==
These were the standing world and Olympic records (in seconds) prior to the 1952 Winter Olympics.

World record	41.2(*)	(Soviet Union) Yuri Sergeev	Medeo (URS)	19 January 1952
Olympic record	43.1	(Norway) Finn Helgesen	St. Moritz (SUI)	31 January 1948

(*) The record was set in a high altitude venue (more than 1000 metres above sea level) and on naturally frozen ice.

== Results ==
The current world record holder Yuri Sergeev did not compete as the Soviet Union did not participate in the Oslo Games, sending observers instead to prepare for the 1956 Winter Olympics.

Place	Speed skater	Time
1	Ken Henry (USA)	43.2
2	Don McDermott (USA)	43.9
3	Gordon Audley (CAN)	44.0
3	Arne Johansen (NOR)	44.0
5	Finn Helgesen (NOR)	44.0
6	Hroar Elvenes (NOR)	44.1
6	Kiyotaka Takabayashi (JPN)	44.1
8	Gerard Maarse (NED)	44.2
8	Toivo Salonen (FIN)	44.2
10	Sigmund Søfteland (NOR)	44.3
11	Johnny Werket (USA)	44.5
12	Masanori Aoki (JPN)	44.8
12	Mats Bolmstedt (SWE)	44.8
12	Frank Stack (CAN)	44.8
15	Robert Fitzgerald (USA)	44.9
15	Sukenobu Kudo (JPN)	44.9
15	Craig MacKay (CAN)	44.9
18	Tsuneo Sato (JPN)	45.2
19	Cockie van der Elst (NED)	45.3
19	Wim van der Voort (NED)	45.3
21	Norman Holwell (GBR)	45.4
21	Kalevi Laitinen (FIN)	45.4
23	Gunnar Ström (SWE)	45.6
24	Kauko Salomaa (FIN)	45.7
25	Stig Lindberg (SWE)	45.9
25	Franz Offenberger (AUT)	45.9
25	Enrico Musolino (ITA)	45.9
28	Ferenc Lőrincz (HUN)	46.1
29	Colin Hickey (AUS)	46.2
30	Ralf Olin (CAN)	46.5
31	Bengt Malmsten (SWE)	46.6
32	József Merényi (HUN)	46.7
33	Theo Meding (GER)	46.8
34	Bill Jones (GBR)	46.9
35	Robert Laboubée (BEL)	47.2
36	Konrad Pecher (AUT)	47.3
37	Arthur Mannsbarth (AUT)	47.6
38	Guido Citterio (ITA)	48.2
39	Jean Massez (BEL)	49.2
—	Jan Charisius (NED)	DNF
—	Lassi Parkkinen (FIN)	DNF

Finn Helgesen did not receive a bronze medal because he was paired up with Arne Johansen and finished behind his opponent.

Jan Charisius and Lassi Parkkinen gave up after a fall.
