= Alpine skiing at the 1952 Winter Olympics – Men's downhill =

Men's downhill at the VI Olympic Winter Games
- Alpine skiing
- Venue: Norefjell Ski Resort, Krødsherad, Norway
- Date: 16 February 1952
- Competitors: 81 from 27 nations
- Winning time: 2:30.8

Medalists
1st place, gold medalist(s)		Zeno Colò	Italy
2nd place, silver medalist(s)		Othmar Schneider	Austria
3rd place, bronze medalist(s)		Christian Pravda	Austria

Men's Downhill
- Interactive map of Men's Downhill
- Location: Norefjell
- Vertical: 750 m (2,461 ft)
- Top elevation: 940 m (3,084 ft) AMSL
- Base elevation: 190 m (623 ft)

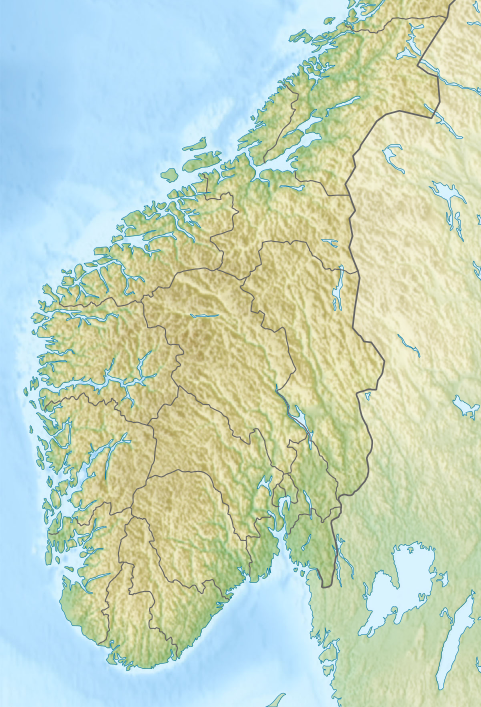
Locations in southern Norway

The men's alpine skiing downhill was the third of six events of the alpine skiing programme at the 1952 Winter Olympics in Norway. It was held at Norefjell ski area on Saturday, 16 February, and started at 1 p.m. It followed the women's giant slalom on Thursday and men's giant slalom on Friday.

This was the second Olympic downhill race, first run as a separate event in 1948.

Defending world champion Zeno Colò of Italy won the gold, the only Olympic medal of his career; he was fourth in the other two events. More than a second behind was silver medalist Othmar Schneider, and Christian Pravda took the bronze. Defending Olympic champion Henri Oreiller was over ten seconds back, in a tie for fourteenth place.

The race's starting elevation was 940 m (3,084 ft) above sea level; the course length was 2.60 km (1.62 mi), with a vertical drop of 750 m (2,461 ft). Colò's winning time of 150.8 seconds yielded an average speed of 62.07 km/h (38.6 mph), with an average vertical descent rate of 4.97 m/s (16.3 ft/s).

Eighty-one alpine skiers from 27 nations competed.

== Results ==
Saturday, 16 February 1952
The race was started at 13:00 local time, (UTC +1).

Place	Bib #	Competitor	Time	Difference
1st place, gold medalist(s)	5	Zeno Colò (ITA)	2:30.8	—
2nd place, silver medalist(s)	8	Othmar Schneider (AUT)	2:32.0	+1.2
3rd place, bronze medalist(s)	12	Christian Pravda (AUT)	2:32.4	+1.6
4	6	Fred Rubi (SUI)	2:32.5	+1.7
5	41	Bill Beck (USA)	2:33.3	+2.5
6	16	Stein Eriksen (NOR)	2:33.8	+3.0
7	3	Gunnar Hjeltnes (NOR)	2:35.9	+5.1
8	1	Carlo Gartner (ITA)	2:36.5	+5.7
9	25	Georges Schneider (SUI)	2:37.0	+6.2
10	10	Gottlieb Perren (SUI)	2:37.1	+6.3
11	2	James Couttet (FRA)	2:38.7	+7.9
12	32	Richard Buek (USA)	2:39.1	+8.3
13	49	Janko Štefe (YUG)	2:40.6	+9.8
14	24	Jack Reddish (USA)	2:41.5	+10.7
14	15	Henri Oreiller (FRA)	2:41.5	+10.7
16	22	Willi Klein (GER)	2:42.8	+12.0
17	39	Beni Obermüller (GER)	2:42.9	+12.1
18	9	Ilio Colli (ITA)	2:43.2	+12.4
18	38	Robert Richardson (CAN)	2:43.2	+12.4
20	26	Silvio Alverà (ITA)	2:43.6	+12.8
20	37	Johnny Lunde (NOR)	2:43.6	+12.8
22	48	Andrzej Gąsienica Roj (POL)	2:44.3	+13.5
23	33	John Fredriksson (SWE)	2:44.5	+13.7
24	23	Chiharu Igaya (JPN)	2:45.0	+14.2
25	11	Maurice Sanglard (FRA)	2:45.4	+14.6
26	13	Bernhard Perren (SUI)	2:46.1	+15.3
27	29	Åke Nilsson (SWE)	2:47.0	+16.2
28	7	Otto Linher (AUT)	2:47.9	+17.1
29	51	Stefan Dziedzic (POL)	2:49.4	+18.6
30	83	Georgi Dimitrov (BUL)	2:49.9	+19.1
31	46	Gordon Morrison (CAN)	2:51.1	+20.3
32	30	Brooks Dodge (USA)	2:52.2	+21.4
32	69	John Griffin (CAN)	2:52.2	+21.4
34	44	Sixten Isberg (SWE)	2:53.4	+22.6
35	27	Guy de Huertas (FRA)	2:54.4	+23.6
35	59	Mihai Bîră (ROU)	2:54.4	+23.6
37	50	Francisco Viladomat (ESP)	2:55.4	+24.6
38	43	Pepi Schwaiger (GER)	2:55.5	+24.7
39	34	John Boyagis (GBR)	2:55.6	+24.8
39	77	Dimitar Drazhev (BUL)	2:55.6	+24.8
41	45	André Bertrand (CAN)	2:56.0	+25.2
42	55	Andrzej Czarniak (POL)	2:56.4	+25.6
43	40	Józef Marusarz (POL)	2:58.7	+27.9
44	65	Pentti Alonen (FIN)	2:59.7	+28.9
45	54	Dick Pappenheim (NED)	3:00.0	+30.2
46	47	Luis de Ridder (ARG)	3:01.8	+31.0
47	66	Pablo Rosenkjer (ARG)	3:02.9	+32.1
48	64	Peter Pappenheim (NED)	3:05.7	+34.9
49	63	Haukur Sigurðsson (ISL)	3:06.0	+35.2
50	91	Stefán Kristjánsson (ISL)	3:06.1	+35.3
51	42	Dumitru Sulică (ROU)	3:07.3	+36.5
52	81	Ásgeir Eyjólfsson (ISL)	3:08.3	+37.5
53	53	Luis Arias (ESP)	3:09.2	+38.4
54	57	Juan Poll (ESP)	3:10.1	+39.3
54	67	Jón Karl Sigurðsson (ISL)	3:10.1	+39.3
56	89	Eino Kalpala (FIN)	3:16.2	+45.4
57	76	Ibrahim Geagea (LIB)	3:20.2	+49.4
58	58	Noel Harrison (GBR)	3:21.5	+50.7
59	92a	Ion Caşa (ROU)	3:26.4	+55.6
60	61	Bill Day (AUS)	3:31.4	+1:00.6
61	60	Michel Feron (BEL)	3:31.5	+1:00.7
62	93	Otto Jung (ARG)	3:34.9	+1:04.1
63	90	Denis Feron (BEL)	3:36.5	+1:05.7
64	70	Georgi Mitrov (BUL)	3:44.5	+1:13.7
65	78	Herbert Familton (NZL)	3:44.6	+1:13.8
66	73	Eduardo Silva (CHI)	3:52.3	+1:21.5
67	74	Barry Patten (AUS)	3:53.1	+1:22.3
68	71	Jaime Errázuriz (CHI)	3:53.3	+1:22.5
69	80	Duarte Silva (POR)	3:58.4	+1:27.6
70	92b	Gino de Pellegrín (ARG)	4:02.9	+1:32.1
71	88	Bob Arnott (AUS)	4:13.5	+1:42.7
72	87	Alexandros Vouxinos (GRE)	6:10.8	+3:40.0
—	14	Stig Sollander (SWE)	DSQ	
—	19	Sverre Johannessen (NOR)	DSQ	
—	31	Hisashi Mizugami (JPN)	DSQ	
—	72	Radu Scîrneci (ROU)	DSQ	
—	79	Angelos Lembesi (GRE)	DSQ	
—	82	Carlos Eiras (ARG)	DSQ	
—	84	Aristeo Benavídez (ARG)	DSQ	
—	86	Antonios Miliordos (GRE)	DSQ	
—	4	Egon Schöpf (AUT)	DNF	
—		Pepi Erben (GER)	DNF	
