= Romania at the 1952 Winter Olympics =

- IOC code: ROU
- NOC: Romanian Olympic and Sports Committee
- Website: www.cosr.ro (in Romanian, English, and French)

in Oslo
- Competitors: 16 (men) in 3 sports
- Medals: Gold 0 Silver 0 Bronze 0 Total 0

Winter Olympics appearances (overview)
- 1928; 1932; 1936; 1948; 1952; 1956; 1960; 1964; 1968; 1972; 1976; 1980; 1984; 1988; 1992; 1994; 1998; 2002; 2006; 2010; 2014; 2018; 2022; 2026

Romania competed at the 1952 Winter Olympics in Oslo, Norway.

== Alpine skiing ==
Men

Athlete	Event	Race 1		Race 2		Total	
Athlete	Event	Time	Rank	Time	Rank	Time	Rank
Radu Scîrneci	Downhill					DSQ	–
Ion Caşa	Downhill					3:26.4	59
Dumitru Sulică	Downhill					3:07.3	51
Mihai Bîră	Downhill					2:54.4	35
Ștefan Ghiță	Giant Slalom					3:06.7	64
Dumitru Sulică	Giant Slalom					3:01.7	59
Radu Scîrneci	Giant Slalom					3:00.1	54
Mihai Bîră	Giant Slalom					2:53.0	45
Andrei Kovacs	Slalom	1:31.0	77	did not advance			
Ștefan Ghiță	Slalom	1:17.6	59	did not advance			
Ion Coliban	Slalom	1:16.6	57	did not advance			
Mihai Bîră	Slalom	1:09.5	42	did not advance			

== Cross-country skiing ==
Men

Event	Athlete	Race	
Event	Athlete	Time	Rank
18 km	Cornel Nicolae Crăciun	1'17:11	68
18 km	Florea Lepădatu	1'15:42	63
18 km	Moise Crăciun	1'14:41	61
18 km	Constantin Enache	1'11:00	39
50 km	Ion Hebedeanu	4'47:58	32
50 km	Dumitru Frăţilă	4'30:13	24
50 km	Ion Sumedrea	4'24:45	23
50 km	Gheorghe Olteanu	4'23:08	22

Men's 4 × 10 km relay

Athletes	Race	
Athletes	Time	Rank
Moise Crăciun; Manole Aldescu; Dumitru Frăţilă; Constantin Enache	2'38:23	10

== Nordic combined ==
Events:

- 18 km cross-country skiing
- normal hill ski jumping

The cross-country skiing part of this event was combined with the main medal event, meaning that athletes competing here were skiing for two disciplines at the same time. Details can be found above in this article, in the cross-country skiing section.

The ski jumping (normal hill) event was held separate from the main medal event of ski jumping, results can be found in the table below (athletes were allowed to perform three jumps, the best two jumps were counted and are shown here).

Athlete	Event	Cross-country		Ski Jumping				Total	
Athlete	Event	Points	Rank	Distance 1	Distance 2	Points	Rank	Points	Rank
Cornel Nicolae Crăciun	Individual	186.121	20	56.5	59.5	190.5	16	376.621	19
