= Romania at the 1948 Winter Olympics =

- IOC code: ROU
- NOC: Romanian Olympic and Sports Committee
- Website: www.cosr.ro (in Romanian, English, and French)

in St. Moritz
- Competitors: 7 (men) in 1 sport
- Medals: Gold 0 Silver 0 Bronze 0 Total 0

Winter Olympics appearances (overview)
- 1928; 1932; 1936; 1948; 1952; 1956; 1960; 1964; 1968; 1972; 1976; 1980; 1984; 1988; 1992; 1994; 1998; 2002; 2006; 2010; 2014; 2018; 2022; 2026

Romania competed at the 1948 Winter Olympics in St. Moritz, Switzerland.

== Alpine skiing ==
=== Men ===
Athlete	Event	Race 1		Race 2		Total	
Athlete	Event	Time	Rank	Time	Rank	Time	Rank
Vasile Ionescu	Downhill					3:54.1	74
Mihai Bîră	Downhill					3:52.3	71
Ion Coliban	Downhill					3:49.2	66
Dumitru Sulică	Downhill					3:39.4	58
Dumitru Frăţilă	Downhill					3:39.3	57
Radu Scîrneci	Downhill					3:35.0	51
Radu Scîrneci	Slalom	DSQ	–	–	–	DSQ	–
Bela Imre	Slalom	1:57.4	57	1:40.3	58	3:37.7	57
Ion Coliban	Slalom	1:30.1	41	1:18.8	38	2:48.9	39
Dumitru Sulică	Slalom	1:27.2	37	1:20.7	43	2:47.9	38

=== Men's combined ===
The downhill part of this event was held along with the main medal event of downhill skiing. For athletes competing in both events, the same time was used (see table above for the results). The slalom part of the event was held separate from the main medal event of slalom skiing (included in table below).

Athlete	Slalom			Total (downhill + slalom)	
Athlete	Time 1	Time 2	Rank	Points	Rank
Vasile Ionescu	1:45.8	1:34.4	60	61.48	53
Dumitru Frăţilă	1:41.7	1:21.4	44	45.88	40
Dumitru Sulică	1:41.5	1:22.8	47	46.52	42
Ion Coliban	1:36.0	1:15.4	37	46.12	41
