= Japan at the 1952 Winter Olympics =

- IOC code: JPN
- NOC: Japanese Olympic Committee
- Website: www.joc.or.jp (in Japanese and English)

in Oslo
- Competitors: 13 (men) in 5 sports
- Medals: Gold 0 Silver 0 Bronze 0 Total 0

Winter Olympics appearances (overview)
- 1928; 1932; 1936; 1948; 1952; 1956; 1960; 1964; 1968; 1972; 1976; 1980; 1984; 1988; 1992; 1994; 1998; 2002; 2006; 2010; 2014; 2018; 2022; 2026

Japan competed at the 1952 Winter Olympics in Oslo, Norway. Japan returned to the Winter Games after not being invited to the 1948 Winter Olympics because of the nation's role in World War II.

== Alpine skiing ==
Men

Athlete	Event	Race 1		Race 2		Total	
Athlete	Event	Time	Rank	Time	Rank	Time	Rank
Hisashi Mizugami	Downhill					DSQ	–
Chiharu Igaya	Downhill					2:45.0	24
Hisashi Mizugami	Giant Slalom					2:40.9	26
Chiharu Igaya	Giant Slalom					2:36.1	20
Hishashi Mizugami	Slalom	1:12.8	52	did not advance			
Chiharu Igaya	Slalom	1:02.6	14 Q	1:03.1	10	2:05.7	11

== Cross-country skiing ==
Men

Event	Athlete	Race	
Event	Athlete	Time	Rank
18 km	Ryoichi Fujisawa	1'14:41	61
18 km	Kenichi Yamamoto	1'08:49	22

== Nordic combined ==
Events:

- 18 km cross-country skiing
- normal hill ski jumping

The cross-country skiing part of this event was combined with the main medal event, meaning that athletes competing here were skiing for two disciplines at the same time. Details can be found above in this article, in the cross-country skiing section.

The ski jumping (normal hill) event was held separate from the main medal event of ski jumping, results can be found in the table below (athletes were allowed to perform three jumps, the best two jumps were counted and are shown here).

Athlete	Event	Cross-country		Ski Jumping				Total	
Athlete	Event	Points	Rank	Distance 1	Distance 2	Points	Rank	Points	Rank
Ryoichi Fujisawa	Individual	195.333	18	61.5	63.0	201.0	10	396.333	14

== Ski jumping ==
Athlete	Event	Jump 1			Jump 2			Total	
Athlete	Event	Distance	Points	Rank	Distance	Points	Rank	Points	Rank
Kozo Kawashima	Normal hill	59.5 (fall)	59.0	43	56.0	89.0	40	148.0	42
Ryoichi Fujisawa	Normal hill	57.5	93.5	34	55.5	90.0	38	183.5	34
Tatsuo Watanabe	Normal hill	59.0	95.0	30	59.0	94.0	27	189.0	27
Hiroshi Yoshizawa	Normal hill	59.5	95.0	30	56.5	87.5	42	182.5	36

== Speed skating ==
Men

Event	Athlete	Race	
Event	Athlete	Time	Rank
500 m	Tsuneo Sato	45.2	18
500 m	Sukenobu Kudo	44.9	15
500 m	Masanori Aoki	44.8	12
500 m	Kiyotaka Takabayashi	44.1	6
1500 m	Kiyotaka Takabayashi	2:32.0	34
1500 m	Sukenobu Kudo	2:31.6	33
1500 m	Masanori Aoki	2:26.9	23
1500 m	Tsuneo Sato	2:23.9	11
5000 m	Kazuhiko Sugawara	8:44.4	15
5000 m	Yoshiyasu Gomi	8:38.6	10
10,000 m	Yoshiyasu Gomi	17:53.0	14
10,000 m	Kazuhiko Sugawara	17:34.0	7
