= 1952 Winter Olympics medal table =

1952 Winter Olympics medals
- Location: Oslo, Norway

Highlights
- Most gold medals: Norway (7)
- Most total medals: Norway (16)
- Medalling NOCs: 13

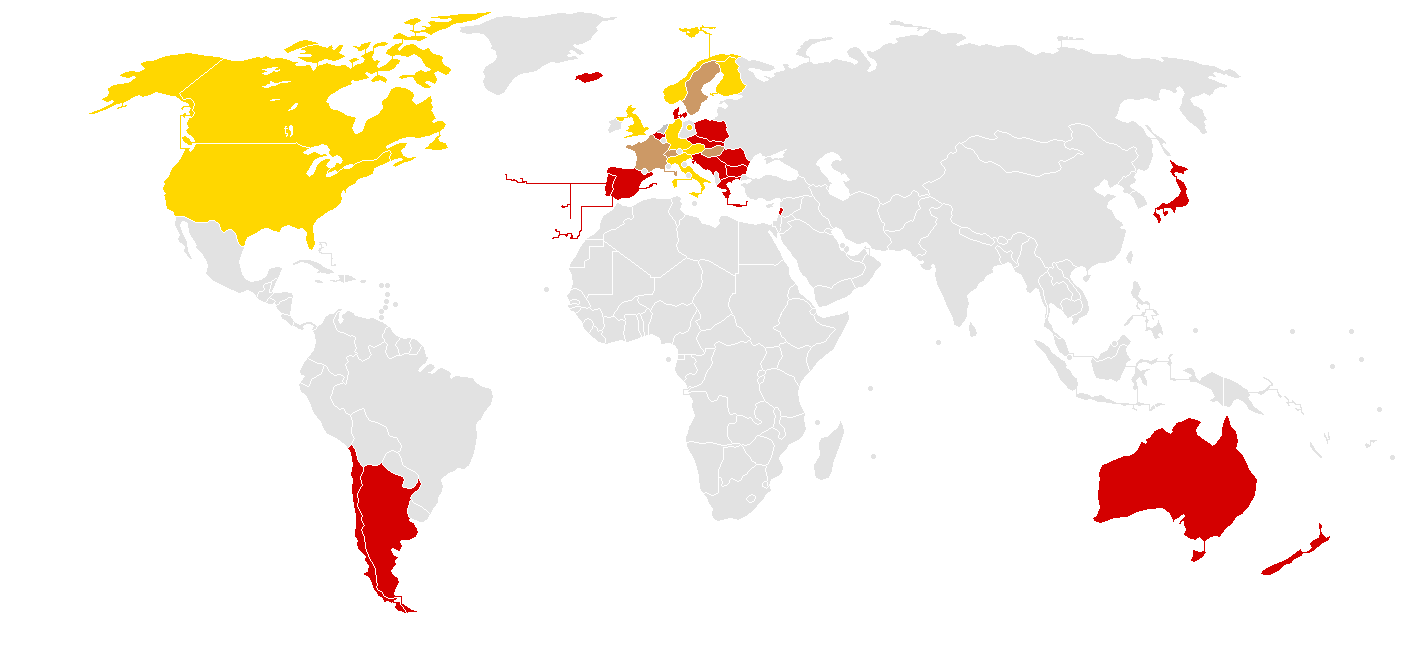
1952 Winter Olympic Games Medals map Legend: Gold represents countries that won at least one gold medal Silver represents countries that won at least one silver medal Bronze represents countries that won at least one bronze medal Red represents countries that did not win any medals Grey represents countries that did not participate

The 1952 Winter Olympics, officially known as the VI Olympic Winter Games, took place in Oslo, Norway, from 14 to 25 February 1952. A total of 694 athletes representing 30 National Olympic Committees (NOCs) participated in the Games, taking part in 22 events from 6 sports.

From the thirteen NOCs that collected at least one medal, eight secured at least one gold. Ten NOCs won more than one medal, and among these, Norway was the most successful with sixteen medals, including seven golds. The United States (eleven medals, four golds) and Finland (nine medals, three golds) finished second and third in the medal table, respectively.

Norway's Hjalmar Andersen and Germany's Mirl Buchner were the top medal winners, with three medals each. The Netherlands got its first Winter Olympics medals, when Kees Broekman and Wim van der Voort won three silver medals between them in speed skating. Portugal and New Zealand made their Winter Olympic Games debuts in Oslo, but neither nation won a medal.

== Highlights ==
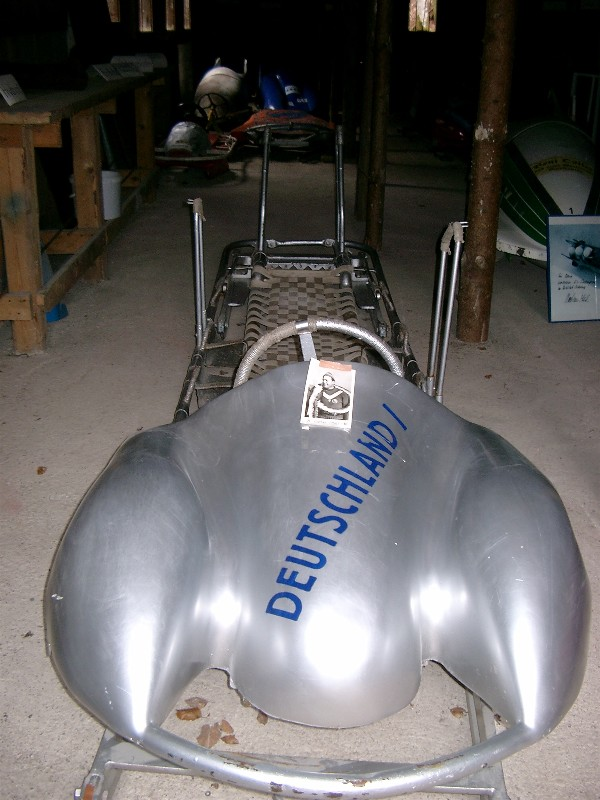
The gold medal-winning four-man bobsleigh from Germany

Oslo was the first Scandinavian city to host a Winter Olympics. Athletes from the host nation won more medals than any other nation. Truck driver Hjalmar Andersen won three out of the four speed skating events, and Simon Slåttvik and Sverre Stenersen won gold and bronze in Nordic combined. Ski jumpers Arnfinn Bergmann and Torbjørn Falkanger placed first and second, and only Swedish jumper Karl Holmström prevented a Norwegian sweep.

After a 16-year hiatus from Olympic competition Germany made a triumphant return, winning seven medals and three golds. They won gold medals in both two- and four-man bobsleigh events. The results for both events were identical with the United States and Switzerland taking silver and bronze. The other gold medal for Germany went to the husband and wife figure skating pair of Paul and Ria Falk, who won the mixed pairs competition. Mirl Buchner of Germany was the only other triple medalist when she won three medals in alpine skiing, placing second in the downhill and third in the slalom and giant slalom.

Wim van der Voort from the Netherlands placed second in the 1,500 meter speed skating events and his countryman Kees Broekman placed second in the 5,000 and 10,000-meter races. These were the first-ever Dutch medals at the Winter Olympics. Great Britain's lone medal was won by Jeannette Altwegg, who became only the second British woman to win the ladies' figure skating competition. Dick Button and James Grogan of the United States won gold and bronze in the men's figure skating event. Button became the first figure skater to land a triple jump in competition when he performed the triple loop in the men's free skate program.

Finnish athletes won nine medals and three golds at the Games. They dominated the cross-country events, winning eight out of a possible twelve medals. A women's race was added to the cross-country program for the first time and Finnish skiers Lydia Wideman, Mirja Hietamies and Siiri Rantanen swept the event. Veikko Hakulinen won the 50-kilometer men's race to begin an Olympic career that would culminate in seven medals, three of them gold.

The ice hockey tournament was won by Canada. Their gold medal game against the United States ended in a tie, and International rules at the time did not allow for overtime, so the gold medal was awarded to Canada on goal differential. Canada had won all but one Olympic hockey tournament thus far, but in 1956 the Soviet team entered the competition and ended Canadian dominance.

== Medal table ==
The medal table is based on information provided by the International Olympic Committee (IOC) and is consistent with IOC convention in its published medal tables. The table uses the Olympic medal table sorting method. By default, the table is ordered by the number of gold medals the athletes from a nation have won, where a nation is an entity represented by a National Olympic Committee (NOC). The number of silver medals is taken into consideration next, and then the number of bronze medals. If teams are still tied, equal ranking is given and they are listed alphabetically by their IOC country code.

There was a tie for third place in the men's 500-metre event in speed skating, therefore two bronze medals were awarded.

* Host nation (Norway)

Rank	Nation	Gold	Silver	Bronze	Total
1	Norway*	7	3	6	16
2	United States	4	6	1	11
3	Finland	3	4	2	9
4	Germany	3	2	2	7
5	Austria	2	4	2	8
6	Canada	1	0	1	2
6	Italy	1	0	1	2
8	Great Britain	1	0	0	1
9	Netherlands	0	3	0	3
10	Sweden	0	0	4	4
11	Switzerland	0	0	2	2
12	France	0	0	1	1
12	Hungary	0	0	1	1
Totals (13 entries)		22	22	23	67

== Notes ==
- The IOC medal table currently shows medals won by both "Germany" and "Federal Republic of Germany (1950–1990, GER since)", which have been combined here. The official report for these Games refers to Germany, not West Germany or FRG.
