= Netherlands at the 1952 Winter Olympics =

- Flag of the Netherlands
- IOC code: NED
- NOC: Dutch Olympic Committee

in Oslo
- Competitors: 11 (9 men, 2 women) in 3 sports
- Flag bearer: Wim van der Voort (speed skating)
- Medals Ranked 9th: Gold 0 Silver 3 Bronze 0 Total 3

Winter Olympics appearances (overview)
- 1928; 1932; 1936; 1948; 1952; 1956; 1960; 1964; 1968; 1972; 1976; 1980; 1984; 1988; 1992; 1994; 1998; 2002; 2006; 2010; 2014; 2018; 2022; 2026

Athletes from the Netherlands competed at the 1952 Winter Olympics in Oslo, Norway.

== Medalists ==
Medal	Name	Sport	Event
Silver	Kees Broekman	Speed skating	Men's 5000 metres
Silver	Kees Broekman	Speed skating	Men's 10,000 metres
Silver	Wim van der Voort	Speed skating	Men's 1500 metres

== Alpine skiing ==
=== Men ===
Athlete	Event	Race 1		Race 2		Total	
Athlete	Event	Time	Rank	Time	Rank	Time	Rank
Peter Pappenheim	Downhill					3:05.7	48
Dick Pappenheim	Downhill					3:00.0	45
Peter Pappenheim	Giant Slalom					3:15.1	70
Dick Pappenheim	Giant Slalom					2:57.6	52
Dick Pappenheim	Slalom	1:29.1	74	did not advance			
Peter Pappenheim	Slalom	1:22.6	68	did not advance			

=== Women ===
Athlete	Event	Race	
Athlete	Event	Time	Rank
Margriet Prajoux-Bouma	Giant Slalom	3:31.0	40

== Figure skating ==
=== Women ===
Athlete	Event	CF	FS	Points	Places	Final rank
Lidy Stoppelman	Women's singles	21	23	123.544	193	22

== Speed skating ==
=== Men ===
Event	Athlete	Race	
Event	Athlete	Time	Rank
500 m	Jan Charisius	DNF	–
500 m	Cockie van der Elst	45.3	19
500 m	Gerard Maarse	44.2	8
500 m	Wim van der Voort	45.3	19
1500 m	Kees Broekman	2:22.8	5
1500 m	Cockie van der Elst	2:27.6	26
1500 m	Gerard Maarse	2:24.3	12
1500 m	Wim van der Voort	2:20.6	2nd place, silver medalist(s)
5000 m	Kees Broekman	8:21.6	2nd place, silver medalist(s)
5000 m	Anton Huiskes	8:28.5	4
5000 m	Egbert van 't Oever	8:47.6	19
5000 m	Wim van der Voort	8:30.6	5
10,000 m	Kees Broekman	17:10.6	2nd place, silver medalist(s)
10,000 m	Anton Huiskes	17:25.5	5
10,000 m	Egbert van 't Oever	18:20.8	19
