= Carlos Eiras =

Argentine alpine skier (1932–2013)

Personal information
- Born: 12 June 1932; Buenos Aires, Argentina
- Died: 13 September 2013 (aged 81); Buenos Aires, Argentina

Sport
- Sport: Alpine skiing

Carlos Eiras (12 June 1932 – 13 September 2013) was an Argentine alpine skier. He competed in the men's downhill at the 1952 Winter Olympics.
