= William Beck (alpine skier) =

American alpine skier (born 1929–2017)

Personal information
- Born: September 1, 1929 Melrose, Massachusetts, U.S.
- Died: February 16, 2017 (aged 87) Middlebury, Vermont, U.S.

Sport
- Sport: Alpine skiing

William Beck (September 1, 1929 – February 16, 2017) was an American alpine ski racer. He competed at the 1952 Winter Olympics and the 1956 Winter Olympics. Born in Melrose, Massachusetts, Beck graduated from South Kingstown High School in Wakefield, Rhode Island, and skied for Dartmouth College in Hanover, New Hampshire.

Beck's fifth place in the 1952 Olympic downhill was the best result for an American male in that event for over three decades (tied by Pete Patterson in 1980), until Bill Johnson's gold medal in 1984.

== Olympic results ==
Year	Age	Slalom	Giant Slalom	Downhill	Combined
1952	22	—	—	5	not run
1956	26	—	—	DSQ	not run
