= Dimitri Atanasov =

Bulgarian alpine skier (born 1927)

Personal information
- Nationality: Bulgarian
- Born: 8 August 1927

Sport
- Sport: Alpine skiing

Dimitri Atanasov (Bulgarian: Димитри Атанасов, born 8 August 1927) is a Bulgarian alpine skier. He competed in the men's slalom at the 1952 Winter Olympics.
