= Antoin Miliordos =

Greek alpine skier

Antoin Miliordos (also known as Antonios Miliordos) (13 April 1924 – November 2012) was a Greek alpine skier who represented his nation at the Winter Olympic Games.

== 1952 Winter Olympics ==
Miliordos' only Winter Olympic appearance came at the 1952 Games hosted in Oslo, Norway. Alpine skiing events at the Games were held at Norefjell, a ski resort one and a half hours drive north from the capital, and Rødkleiva a ski resort known for its Nordic trails and ski jumping. He took part in two of the three skiing events at the Games, downhill and slalom.

A total of 81 athletes contested the downhill on 16 February at Norefjell. Miliordos was one of nine competitors to be disqualified from the event during the run. The gold medal in the event was won by Italian skier Zeno Colò who was the reigning world champion in the event having taken gold at the 1950 FIS Alpine World Ski Championships in Aspen; Austrians Othmar Schneider and Christian Pravda took silver and bronze respectively.

The slalom event at the Games included 86 athletes and took place on 19 February at Rødkleiva. During his first run, Miliordos fell eighteen times. Disgusted, he decided to sit down part way through and then crossed the finish line facing backwards. His time of 2 minutes 26.9 seconds for one run was 26.9 seconds slower than gold medallist Othmar Schneider's time for two runs. He finished 79th and last of all skiers who completed the first run and did not advance to the second run. Stein Eriksen and Guttorm Berge, both competing for Norway, took the silver and bronze behind Schneider.
