= Firmin Mattis =

French alpine skier (1929–2024)

Personal information
- Nationality: French
- Born: 16 September 1929; Val-d'Isère, France
- Died: 20 March 2024 (aged 94)

Sport
- Sport: Alpine skiing

Firmin Mattis (16 September 1929 – 20 March 2024) was a French alpine skier. He competed in the men's slalom at the 1952 Winter Olympics. Mattis died on 20 March 2024, at the age of 94.
