= Beffa =

Beffa is a surname. Notable people with the surname include:

- Alberto Della Beffa (1914–1969), Italian bobsledder and Olympian
- Jean-Louis Beffa (born 1941), French businessman
- Karol Beffa (born 1973), French-Swiss composer and pianist
