= John Graham Hearn =

British speed skater

John Graham Hearn (27 December 1929 – 7 August 1980) was a British speed skater who competed in the 1952 Winter Olympics and in the 1956 Winter Olympics. In 1952 he finished tenth in the 10000 metres event, 17th in the 5000 metres competition, and 38th in the 1500 metres contest. Four years later he finished 20th in the 10000 metres event, 26th in the 5000 metres competition, 33rd in the 1500 metres contest, and 45th in the 500 metres event.
