= Stig Lindberg (speed skater) =

Swedish speed skater

Personal information
- Nationality: Swedish
- Born: 25 November 1921; Katrineholm, Sweden
- Died: 14 June 1994 (aged 72); Katrineholm, Sweden

Sport
- Sport: Speed skating

Stig Lindberg (25 November 1921 – 14 June 1994) was a Swedish speed skater. He competed in the men's 500 metres events at the 1952 Winter Olympics.
