= Citterio =

Citterio is an Italian surname. Notable people with the surname include:

- Anselmo Citterio (1927–2006), Italian cyclist
- Antonio Citterio (born 1950), Italian furniture designer and industrial designer
- Giuseppe Citterio (born 1967), Italian cyclist
- Guido Citterio (1931–2025), Italian speed skater
