= Sigmund Søfteland =

Norwegian speed skater

Sigmund Søfteland (23 October 1923 – 30 July 1993) was a Norwegian speed skater who competed in the 1952 Winter Olympics and in the 1956 Winter Olympics.

He was born in Os Municipality and died in Bergen.

In 1952 he finished tenth in the 500 metres competition.

Four years later he finished 16th in the 500 metres event.
