= Heini Bierling =

German alpine skier (1930–1967)

Personal information
- Nationality: German
- Born: 23 August 1930; Murnau am Staffelsee, Germany
- Died: 30 January 1967 (aged 36); Murnau am Staffelsee, Germany

Sport
- Sport: Alpine skiing

Heinrich "Heini" Bierling (23 August 1930 – 30 January 1967) was a German alpine skier. He competed in the men's slalom at the 1952 Winter Olympics.

Bierling died on 30 January 1967 after a severe training accident for the Munich Ski Championships. He was forced into paraplegia and died three weeks later.
