= Francisco de Ridder =

Argentine skier (1929–2019)

Personal information
- Born: 23 October 1929; Buenos Aires, Argentina
- Died: 19 May 2019 (aged 89)

Sport
- Sport: Alpine skiing

Francisco de Ridder (23 October 1929 – 19 May 2019) was an Argentine alpine skier. He competed in the men's slalom at the 1952 Winter Olympics.
