= Gordon Morrison =

Gordon Morrison may refer to:

- Gordon Morrison (engineer) (1903–1983), New Zealand consulting engineer and local-body politician
- Gordon Morrison (alpine skier) (1931–1972), Canadian alpine skier
- Gordon Morrison (Shortland Street), a fictional character in the television soap opera Shortland Street
