= Aristeo Benavídez =

Argentine alpine skier (1927–2019)

Personal information
- Born: 12 February 1927 San Carlos de Bariloche, Argentina
- Died: 7 January 2019 (aged 91)

Sport
- Sport: Alpine skiing

Aristeo Benavídez (12 February 1927 – 7 January 2019) was an Argentine alpine skier. He competed in the men's downhill at the 1952 Winter Olympics.

Benavidez first began skiing after he and his brother, Emilio, saw a poster advertising a skiing competition at Cerro Otto. Although the two initially registered because of the promise of cake and chocolate at the finish line, Benavidez ultimately won the competition and was awarded a pair of skis. After training at Cerro Otto, he later left to work as an instructor at Cerro Catedral. He was additionally an avid mountaineer, being a part of Club Andino Bariloche for over 70 years.
