= Dario Colombi =

Italian bobsledder (1929–2010)

Dario Colombi (3 June 1929 – 12 May 2010) was an Italian bobsledder who competed in the early 1950s. At the 1952 Winter Olympics, he finished tenth both in the two-man and in the four-man events.
