= Andrei Kovacs =

Romanian alpine skier

Personal information
- Nationality: Romanian
- Born: 23 November 1921 Baia Mare, Romania

Sport
- Sport: Alpine skiing

Andrei Kovacs (born 23 November 1921, date of death unknown) was a Romanian alpine skier. He competed in the men's slalom at the 1952 Winter Olympics.
