= Kozo Kawashima =

Japanese ski jumper

Kozo Kawashima (川島弘三, Kawashima Kōzō) (born 26 September 1926) is a Japanese former ski jumper who competed in the early 1950s. He finished 42nd in the individual large hill event at the 1952 Winter Olympics in Oslo. He was born in Otaru.
