= Gordon Audley =

Canadian speed skater

Personal information
- Born: April 20, 1928 Winnipeg, Manitoba, Canada
- Died: October 1, 2012 (aged 84)
Medal record
Men's speed skating
Representing Canada
Olympic Games
Bronze medal – third place	1952 Oslo	500 m

Gordon Audley (April 20, 1928 – October 1, 2012) was a Canadian speed skater and Olympic medalist. He was born in Winnipeg, Manitoba. He received a bronze medal at the 1952 Winter Olympics in Oslo, shared with Arne Johansen, after serving as Canada's flag bearer in the opening ceremonies. He was inducted into the Manitoba Sports Hall of Fame and Museum in 1988.

== See also ==
- Manitoba Sports Hall of Fame and Museum
