= Arne Johansen (speed skater) =

Norwegian speed skater

Personal information
- Born: 3 April 1927 Oslo, Norway
- Died: 25 October 2013 (aged 86) Ørland Municipality, Norway

Sport
- Country: Norway
- Sport: Speed skating
- Club: Arbeidernes SK
Medal record
Men's speed skating
Representing Norway
Olympic Games
Bronze medal – third place	1952 Oslo	500 m

Arne Johansen (3 April 1927 – 25 October 2013) was a Norwegian speed skater and Olympic medalist. He received a bronze medal at the 1952 Winter Olympics in Oslo, shared with Gordon Audley from Canada.
