= Hilary Laing =

British alpine skier (1927–2013)

Personal information
- Nationality: British
- Born: 21 September 1927 Guildford, England
- Died: 16 November 2013 (aged 86) Ellisfield, England

Sport
- Sport: Alpine skiing

Hilary Laing (21 September 1927 – 16 November 2013) was a British alpine skier. She competed in three events at the 1952 Winter Olympics.
