= Ildikó Szendrődi-Kővári =

Hungarian alpine skier (1930–2022)

Personal information
- Nationality: Hungarian
- Born: 8 May 1930 Budapest, Hungary
- Died: 29 September 2022 (aged 92) Budapest, Hungary

Sport
- Sport: Alpine skiing

Ildikó Szendrődi-Kővári (8 May 1930 – 29 September 2022) was a Hungarian alpine skier. She competed at the 1952 Winter Olympics and the 1964 Winter Olympics.
