= Jan Charisius =

Dutch speed skater

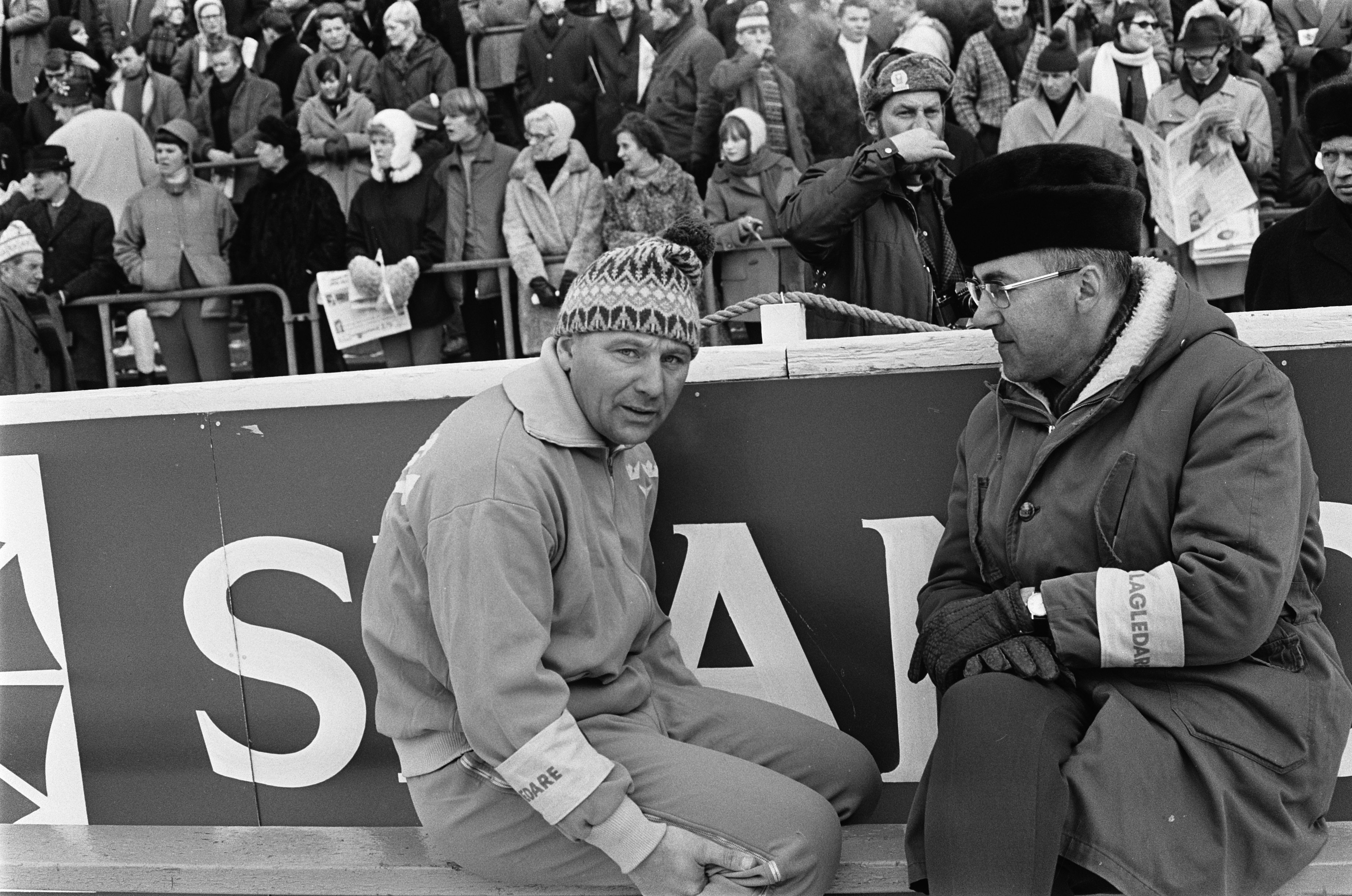

Personal information
- Nationality: Dutch
- Born: 30 September 1926 Leeuwarden, Netherlands
- Died: 3 July 2008 (aged 81) Fagernes, Norway

Sport
- Sport: Speed skating

Jan Charisius (30 September 1926 – 3 July 2008) was a Dutch speed skater. He competed in the men's 500 metres event at the 1952 Winter Olympics.
