= Kazuhiko Sugawara =

Japanese speed skater (1927–1962)

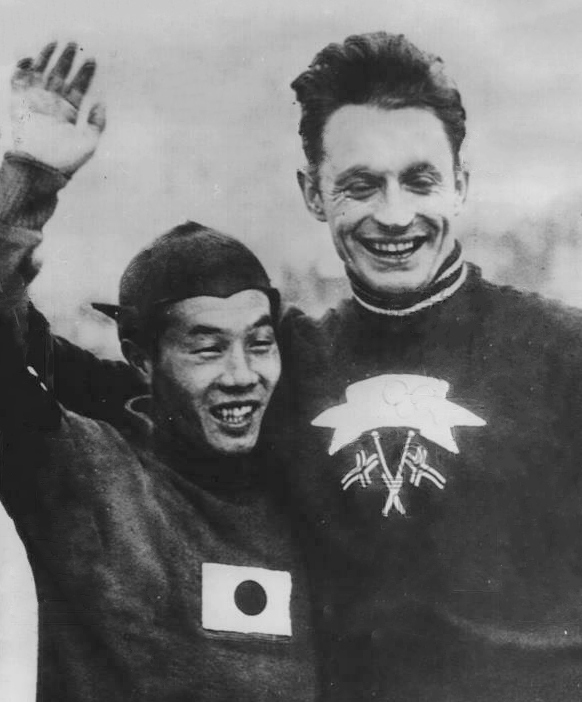
- Sugawara with Hjalmar Andersen at the 1952 Olympics

Personal information
- Born: 1 May 1927 (age 99) Tomakomai, Hokkaido, Japan
- Died: 27 October 1962 (aged 35)
- Height: 165 cm (5 ft 5 in)
- Weight: 50 kg (110 lb)

Sport
- Sport: Speed skating
- Club: Tomakomai Paper Factory

Achievements and titles
- Personal best(s): 500 m – 44.2 (1951); 1500 m – 2:26.4 (1952); 5000 m – 8:35.0 (1952); 10000 m – 17:34.0 (1952)

Kazuhiko Sugawara (菅原 和彦, Sugawara Kazuhiko; 1 May 1927 – 27 October 1962) was a Japanese speed skater who competed in the 1952 Winter Olympics. He finished seventh in the 10000 m and 15th in the 5000 m event.
