= Ion Cașa =

Romanian alpine skier (1926–1999)

Personal information
- Nationality: Romanian
- Born: 4 December 1926; Bușteni, Romania
- Died: 1999 (aged 72–73)

Sport
- Sport: Alpine skiing

Ion Cașa (4 December 1926 – 1999) was a Romanian alpine skier. He competed in the men's downhill at the 1952 Winter Olympics.
