= Ivar Martinsen =

Norwegian speed skater

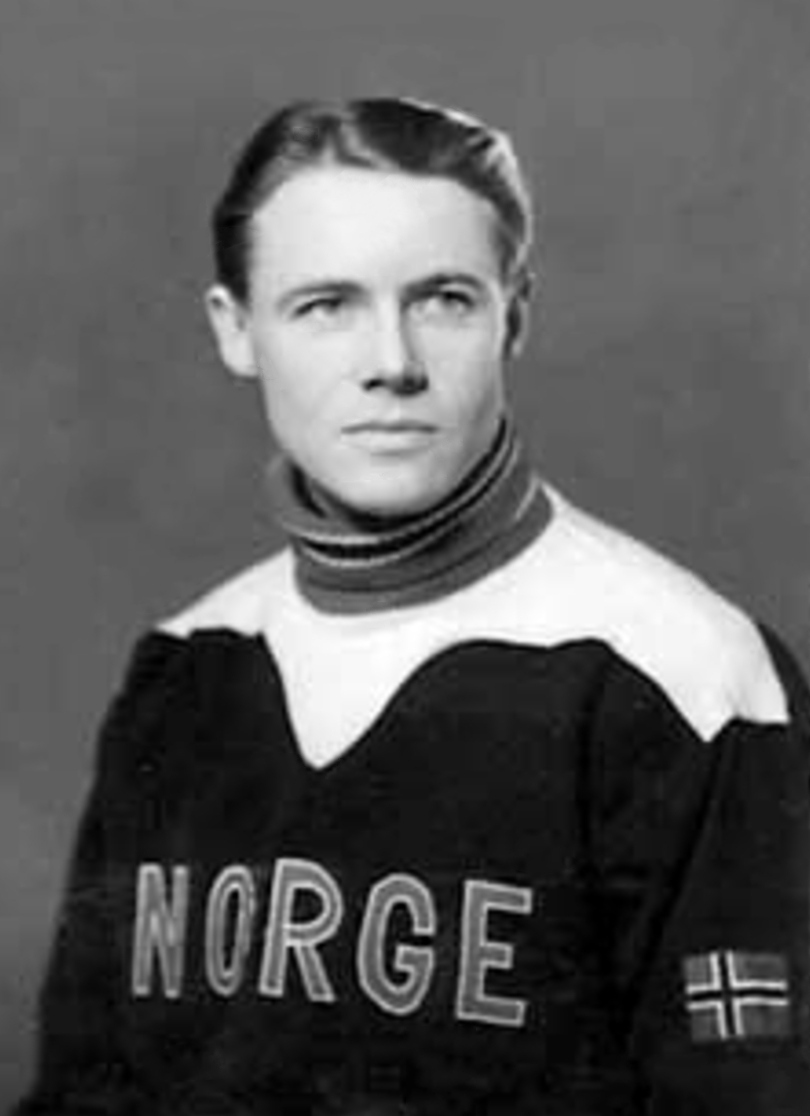
- Martinsen in 1948

Personal information
- Born: 8 December 1920 Løten, Norway
- Died: 24 September 2018 (aged 97) Stange, Norway

Sport
- Sport: Speed skating
- Club: Hamar IL

Achievements and titles
- Personal bests: 500 m – 43.9 (1947); 1500 m – 2:19.2 (1952); 5000 m – 8:23.1 (1951); 10000 m – 17:34.1 (1952)
Medal record
Representing Norway
World championships
Bronze medal – third place	1952 Hamar	Allround
European championships
Bronze medal – third place	1953 Hamar	Allround

Karl Ivar Martinsen (8 December 1920 – 24 September 2018) was a Norwegian speed skater. He competed in the 1500 m event at the 1948 and 1952 Olympics and finished 16th and 8th, respectively. He won bronze medals at the 1952 world and 1953 European allround championships.

Martinsen died in Stange Municipality, Norway on 24 September 2018, aged 97.
