= Luigi Cavalieri =

Italian bobsledder (1914–1992)

Luigi Cavalieri (22 April 1914 – 4 February 1992) was an Italian bobsledder who competed from the late 1940s to the early 1950s. He competed in two Winter Olympics, the 1948 and 1952 Games. He earned his best finish (6th place) in the four-man event at St. Moritz in 1948.
