= Kiyotaka Takabayashi =

Japanese speed skater (born 1928)

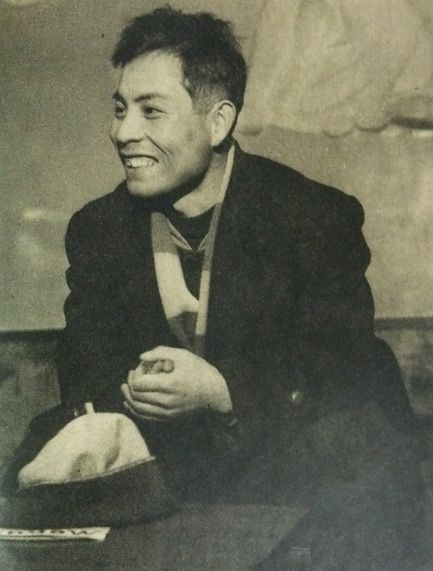
Kiyotaka Takabayashi in 1955.

Kiyotaka Takabayashi (高林 清高, Takabayashi Kiyotaka, born 10 July 1928) is a Japanese former speed skater who competed in the 1952 Winter Olympics and in the 1956 Winter Olympics. He was born in Nagano Prefecture. In 1952 he finished sixth in the 500 metres competition and 34th in the 1500 metres event. Four years later he finished 30th in the 500 metres contest at the 1956 Games.
