= George Merry (skier) =

Canadian alpine skier (1929–2000)

Personal information
- Nationality: Canadian
- Born: 28 April 1929 (age 95)

Sport
- Sport: Alpine skiing

George Merry (28 April 1929 – 6 August 2000) was a Canadian alpine skier who competed in the 1952 Winter Olympics.
