= Ryoichi Fujisawa =

Japanese Nordic combined skier

Ryoichi Fujisawa (藤沢 良一, Fujisawa Ryōichi) (born 25 May 1927) was a Japanese Nordic skier who competed in the early 1950s. At the 1952 Winter Olympics in Oslo, he finished 14th in the Nordic combined event, 34th in the ski jumping individual large hill event, and tied for 61st in the 18 km cross-country skiing event. He was born in Otaru.
