= Fiona Campbell (alpine skier) =

British alpine skier (1929–2005)

Personal information
- Nationality: British
- Born: 12 May 1929; Hamilton, Bermuda
- Died: 8 September 2005 (aged 76); Thirsk, England

Sport
- Sport: Alpine skiing

Fiona Campbell (12 May 1929 – 8 September 2005) was a British alpine skier. She competed in two events at the 1952 Winter Olympics.
