= Niilo Juvonen =

Finnish alpine skier (1928–1986)

Niilo Juvonen (29 December 1928 – 24 January 1986) was a Finnish alpine skier who competed in the 1952 Winter Olympics.
