= Cockie van der Elst =

Dutch speed skater (1928–2021)

Personal information
- Nationality: Dutch
- Born: 26 June 1928 Rotterdam, Netherlands
- Died: 6 September 2021 (aged 93)

Sport
- Sport: Speed skating

Cockie van der Elst (26 June 1928 – 6 September 2021) was a Dutch speed skater. He competed in two events at the 1952 Winter Olympics.
