= Masanori Aoki =

Japanese speed skater

Personal information
- Nationality: Japanese
- Born: 6 September 1927; Tomakomai, Hokkaido, Japan

Sport
- Sport: Speed skating

Masanori Aoki (青木 正則, Aoki Masanori, born 6 September 1927) was a Japanese speed skater. He competed in two events at the 1952 Winter Olympics.
