= Tsuneo Sato =

Japanese speed skater (1925–1992)

Personal information
- Nationality: Japanese
- Born: 18 December 1925 Miyagi, Japan
- Died: 16 September 1992 (aged 66)

Sport
- Sport: Speed skating

Tsuneo Sato (佐藤 恒夫, Satō Tsuneo; 18 December 1925 – 16 September 1992) was a Japanese speed skater. He competed in two events at the 1952 Winter Olympics.
