= Dumitru Frățilă (skier) =

Romanian alpine skier (1926–1988)

Dumitru Frăţilă (Romanian pronunciation: [duˈmitru frəˈt͡silə]; March 6, 1926 – September 1988) was a Romanian alpine skier and cross-country skier who competed in the 1950s. He finished 24th in the 50 km event at the 1952 Winter Olympics in Oslo. He was born in Predeal.
