= Italy at the 1952 Winter Olympics =

- IOC code: ITA
- NOC: Italian National Olympic Committee
- Website: www.coni.it (in Italian)

in Oslo
- Competitors: 33 (28 men, 5 women) in 6 sports
- Flag bearer: Fides Romanin
- Medals Ranked 6th: Gold 1 Silver 0 Bronze 1 Total 2

Winter Olympics appearances (overview)
- 1924; 1928; 1932; 1936; 1948; 1952; 1956; 1960; 1964; 1968; 1972; 1976; 1980; 1984; 1988; 1992; 1994; 1998; 2002; 2006; 2010; 2014; 2018; 2022; 2026

Italy competed at the 1952 Winter Olympics in Oslo, Norway.

== Medalists ==
Medal	Name	Sport	Event
Gold	Zeno Colò	Alpine skiing	Men's downhill
Bronze	Giuliana Chenal-Minuzzo	Alpine skiing	Women's downhill

== Alpine skiing ==
Men

Athlete	Event	Race 1		Race 2		Total	
Athlete	Event	Time	Rank	Time	Rank	Time	Rank
Silvio Alverà	Downhill					2:43.6	20
Ilio Colli	Downhill					2:43.2	18
Carlo Gartner	Downhill					2:36.5	8
Zeno Colò	Downhill					2:30.8	1st place, gold medalist(s)
Roberto Lacedelli	Giant Slalom					2:39.5	24
Silvio Alverà	Giant Slalom					2:37.7	22
Carlo Gartner	Giant Slalom					2:35.7	18
Zeno Colò	Giant Slalom					2:29.1	4
Ermanno Nogler	Slalom	1:09.5	42	did not advance			
Albino Alverà	Slalom	1:04.7	23 Q	1:05.7	20	2:10.4	23
Silvio Alverà	Slalom	1:04.5	22 Q	1:05.3	19	2:09.8	19
Zeno Colò	Slalom	1:00.9	5 Q	1:00.9	4	2:01.8	4

Women

Athlete	Event	Race 1		Race 2		Total	
Athlete	Event	Time	Rank	Time	Rank	Time	Rank
Maria Grazia Marchelli	Downhill					DSQ	–
Celina Seghi	Downhill					1:54.9	15
Giuliana Chenal-Minuzzo	Downhill					1:49.0	3rd place, bronze medalist(s)
Maria Grazia Marchelli	Giant Slalom					DSQ	–
Giuliana Chenal-Minuzzo	Giant Slalom					2:18.2	20
Celina Seghi	Giant Slalom					2:12.5	7
Giuliana Chenal-Minuzzo	Slalom	1:08.0	9	1:07.9	9	2:15.9	8
Celina Seghi	Slalom	1:06.5	2	1:07.3	7	2:13.8	4

== Bobsleigh ==
Sled	Athletes	Event	Run 1		Run 2		Run 3		Run 4		Total	
Sled	Athletes	Event	Time	Rank	Time	Rank	Time	Rank	Time	Rank	Time	Rank
ITA-1	Umberto Gilarduzzi; Luigi Cavalieri	Two-man	1:23.86	8	1:25.26	14	1:24.80	14	1:24.44	12	5:38.36	12
ITA-2	Alberto Della Beffa; Dario Colombi	Two-man	1:23.86	8	1:24.71	10	1:24.03	10	1:24.62	13	5:37.22	10

Sled	Athletes	Event	Run 1		Run 2		Run 3		Run 4		Total	
Sled	Athletes	Event	Time	Rank	Time	Rank	Time	Rank	Time	Rank	Time	Rank
ITA-1	Alberto Della Beffa; Sandro Rasini; Dario Colombi; Dario Poggi	Four-man	1:20.02	11	1:21.39	15	1:18.86	8	1:19.65	8	5:19.92	10
ITA-2	Umberto Gilarduzzi; Michele Alverà; Vittorio Folonari; Luigi Cavalieri	Four-man	1:21.23	14	1:21.35	14	1:21.64	15	1:21.76	13	5:25.98	14

== Cross-country skiing ==
Men

Event	Athlete	Race	
Event	Athlete	Time	Rank
18 km	Alfredo Prucker	1'10:56	38
18 km	Ottavio Compagnoni	1'10:50	36
18 km	Giacomo Mosele	1'10:36	34
18 km	Arrigo Delladio	1'09:17	24
18 km	Federico de Florian	1'06:54	19
50 km	Antenore Cuel	4'16:26	19
50 km	Severino Compagnoni	4'16:13	18

Men's 4 × 10 km relay

Athletes	Race	
Athletes	Time	Rank
Arrigo Delladio; Nino Anderlini; Federico de Florian; Vincenzo Perruchon	2'35:33	6

Women

Event	Athlete	Race	
Event	Athlete	Time	Rank
10 km	Ildegarda Taffra	DNF	–
10 km	Fides Romanin	54:43	17

== Figure skating ==
Men

Athlete	CF	FS	Points	Places	Rank
Carlo Fassi	6	7	169.822	50	6

== Nordic combined ==
Events:

- 18 km cross-country skiing
- normal hill ski jumping

The cross-country skiing part of this event was combined with the main medal event, meaning that athletes competing here were skiing for two disciplines at the same time. Details can be found above in this article, in the cross-country skiing section.

The ski jumping (normal hill) event was held separate from the main medal event of ski jumping, results can be found in the table below (athletes were allowed to perform three jumps, the best two jumps were counted and are shown here).

Athlete	Event	Cross-country		Ski Jumping				Total	
Athlete	Event	Points	Rank	Distance 1	Distance 2	Points	Rank	Points	Rank
Alfredo Prucker	Individual	208.970	12	58.5	59.5	189.0	17	397.970	12

== Speed skating ==
Men

Event	Athlete	Race	
Event	Athlete	Time	Rank
500 m	Guido Citterio	48.2	38
500 m	Enrico Musolino	45.9	25
1500 m	Guido Citterio	2:30.8	32
1500 m	Enrico Musolino	2:30.7	31
10,000 m	Guido Caroli	19:13.6	28
