= Guttorm Berge =

Norwegian alpine skier (1929–2004)

Olympic medal record

Representing Norway

Men's Alpine skiing
Bronze medal – third place	1952 Oslo	Slalom

Guttorm Berge (19 April 1929 – 13 March 2004) was a Norwegian Alpine skier.

He was born in Vardal and died in Høvik.

At the 1952 Olympics in Oslo Berge was bronze medalist in the slalom, 1.7 seconds behind gold winner Othmar Schneider.

Berge was a 1954 graduate of Middlebury College.
