= Alberto Della Beffa =

Italian bobsledder (1914–1969)

Alberto Della Beffa (August 24, 1914 – August 12, 1969) was an Italian bobsledder who competed in the early 1950s. At the 1952 Winter Olympics, he finished tenth both in the two-man event and in the four-man event.

Beffa died on August 12, 1969, when the Cessna 150 he was travelling on crashed in Realp, Canton of Uri, killing him and the pilot.
