= Hungary at the 1952 Winter Olympics =

- IOC code: HUN
- NOC: Hungarian Olympic Committee
- Website: www.olimpia.hu (in Hungarian and English)

in Oslo, Norway February 14–25, 1952
- Competitors: 12 (8 men and 4 women) in 4 sports
- Flag bearer: Ferenc Lőrincz (speed skating)
- Medals Ranked 12th: Gold 0 Silver 0 Bronze 1 Total 1

Winter Olympics appearances (overview)
- 1924; 1928; 1932; 1936; 1948; 1952; 1956; 1960; 1964; 1968; 1972; 1976; 1980; 1984; 1988; 1992; 1994; 1998; 2002; 2006; 2010; 2014; 2018; 2022; 2026

Hungary competed at the 1952 Winter Olympics in Oslo, Norway.

== Medalists ==
Medal	Name	Sport	Event
Bronze	Marianna Nagy; László Nagy	Figure skating	Pairs

== Alpine skiing ==
Men

Athlete	Event	Race 1		Race 2		Total	
Athlete	Event	Time	Rank	Time	Rank	Time	Rank
József Piroska	Giant Slalom					3:39.3	79
József Piroska	Slalom	1:33.5	78	did not advance			

Women

Athlete	Event	Race 1		Race 2		Total	
Athlete	Event	Time	Rank	Time	Rank	Time	Rank
Ildikó Szendrődi-Kővári	Downhill					2:18.5	32
Ildikó Szendrődi-Kővári	Giant Slalom					2:41.7	37
Ildikó Szendrődi-Kővári	Slalom	1:14.7	25	1:15.6	33	2:30.3	30

== Cross-country skiing ==
Men

Event	Athlete	Race	
Event	Athlete	Time	Rank
18 km	Pál Sajgó	1'13:25	53
50 km	Ignác Berecz	4'46:23	31
50 km	Pál Sajgó	4'38:34	27

== Figure skating ==
Men

Athlete	CF	FS	Points	Places	Rank
György Czakó	14	12	132.233	112	12

Women

Athlete	CF	FS	Points	Places	Rank
Eszter Jurek	24	19	121.478	199	23

Pairs

Athletes	Points	Places	Rank
Éva Szöllősi; Gábor Vida	9.244	91.5	10
Marianna Nagy; László Nagy	10.822	31	3rd place, bronze medalist(s)

== Speed skating ==
Men

Event	Athlete	Race	
Event	Athlete	Time	Rank
500 m	József Merényi	46.7	32
500 m	Ferenc Lőrincz	46.1	28
1500 m	József Merényi	2:26.1	21
1500 m	Ferenc Lőrincz	2:23.7	10
5000 m	József Merényi	8:56.6	26
5000 m	Ferenc Lőrincz	8:51.2	21
10,000 m	József Merényi	18:09.0	17

== Sources ==
- Petersen, Rolf, ed. (1952). The Official Report of the Organising Committee of the VIth Winter Olympic Games 1952 at Oslo (PDF). Oslo. Archived from the original (PDF) on 2007-09-30.
- "Olympic Medal Winners". International Olympic Committee.
- Olympic Winter Games 1952, full results by sports-reference.com
