= József Merényi =

Hungarian speed skater (1928–2018)

Personal information
- Nationality: Hungarian
- Born: 19 April 1928 Budapest, Hungary
- Died: 28 January 2018 (aged 89)

Sport
- Sport: Speed skating

József Merényi (19 April 1928 – 28 January 2018) was a Hungarian speed skater. He competed in four events at the 1952 Winter Olympics.
