= Norman Holwell =

British speed skater (1928–2020)

Personal information
- Full name: Norman Albert Holwell
- Nationality: British
- Born: 6 September 1928 Birmingham, England
- Died: 7 April 2020 (aged 91) Oliver, British Columbia, Canada

Sport
- Sport: Speed skating

Norman Albert Holwell (6 September 1928 – 7 April 2020) was a British speed skater. He competed in four events at the 1952 Winter Olympics.
