= Bill Jones (speed skater) =

British speed skater

Personal information
- Full name: William Anthony Ashford Jones
- Nationality: British
- Born: 18 March 1923; Cannock, England
- Died: April 2003; Dudley, England

Sport
- Sport: Speed skating

William Anthony Ashford Jones (18 March 1923 – April 2003) was a British speed skater. He competed in three events at the 1952 Winter Olympics.
