= Ferenc Lőrincz (speed skater) =

Hungarian speed skater

Personal information
- Nationality: Hungarian
- Born: 17 September 1932 (age 94) Budapest, Hungary

Sport
- Sport: Speed skating

Ferenc Lőrincz (born 17 September 1932) is a Hungarian speed skater. He competed in three events at the 1952 Winter Olympics.
