= Great Britain at the 1952 Winter Olympics =

- Flag of the United Kingdom
- IOC code: GBR
- NOC: British Olympic Association

in Oslo
- Competitors: 18 (8 men, 10 women) in 3 sports
- Flag bearer: John Nicks
- Medals Ranked 8th: Gold 1 Silver 0 Bronze 0 Total 1

Winter Olympics appearances (overview)
- 1924; 1928; 1932; 1936; 1948; 1952; 1956; 1960; 1964; 1968; 1972; 1976; 1980; 1984; 1988; 1992; 1994; 1998; 2002; 2006; 2010; 2014; 2018; 2022; 2026

The United Kingdom of Great Britain and Northern Ireland competed as Great Britain at the 1952 Winter Olympics in Oslo, Norway.

== Medallists ==
Medal	Name	Sport	Event
Gold	Jeannette Altwegg	Figure skating	Women's singles

== Alpine skiing ==
Men

Athlete	Event	Race 1		Race 2		Total	
Athlete	Event	Time	Rank	Time	Rank	Time	Rank
Noel Harrison	Downhill					3:21.5	58th
John Boyagis	Downhill					2:55.6	39th
Noel Harrison	Giant Slalom					3:24.1	74th
Rupert de Larrinaga	Giant Slalom					3:16.9	71st
John Boyagis	Giant Slalom					2:52.5	43rd
Noel Harrison	Slalom	DNF	–	did not advance			
John Boyagis	Slalom	1:08.3	37th	did not advance			

Women

Athlete	Event	Race 1		Race 2		Total	
Athlete	Event	Time	Rank	Time	Rank	Time	Rank
Vora Mackintosh	Downhill					DSQ	–
Hilary Laing	Downhill					DSQ	–
Fiona Campbell	Downhill					2:26.1	33rd
Sheena Mackintosh	Downhill					1:58.6	26th
Vora Mackintosh	Giant Slalom					2:57.1	38th
Fiona Campbell	Giant Slalom					2:39.8	36th
Sheena Mackintosh	Giant Slalom					2:22.5	28th
Hilary Laing	Giant Slalom					2:20.7	24th
Sheena Mackintosh	Slalom	1:16.2	30th	1:13.2	28th	2:29.4	28th
Hilary Laing	Slalom	1:13.7	22nd	1:14.2	30th	2:27.9	24th

== Figure skating ==
Women

Athlete	CF	FS	Points	Places	Rank
Patricia Devries	14	20	132.811	148	17
Valda Osborne	7	13	144.767	89	11
Barbara Wyatt	5	11	148.378	63	7
Jeannette Altwegg	1	4	161.756	14	1st place, gold medalist(s)

Pairs

Athletes	Points	Places	Rank
Peri Horne; Raymond Lockwood	9.133	94	11
Jennifer Nicks; John Nicks	10.600	39	4

== Speed skating ==
Men

Event	Athlete	Race	
Event	Athlete	Time	Rank
500 m	Bill Jones	46.9	34
500 m	Norman Holwell	45.4	21
1500 m	John Hearn	2:40.1	38
1500 m	Bill Jones	2:32.2	35
1500 m	Norman Holwell	2:24.5	14
5000 m	Bill Jones	9:03.7	31
5000 m	John Hearn	8:47.0	17
5000 m	Norman Holwell	8:44.5	16
10,000 m	Norman Holwell	18:02.4	15
10,000 m	John Hearn	17:41.5	10
