= Sixten Isberg =

Swedish alpine skier (1921–2012)

Personal information
- Born: 8 February 1921 Åre, Sweden
- Died: 10 June 2012 (aged 91) Östersund, Sweden

Skiing career
- Sport: Alpine skiing

Sixten Isberg (February 8, 1921 – June 10, 2012) was a Swedish alpine skier who competed in the 1948 Winter Olympics and in the 1952 Winter Olympics. He was the Swedish slalom champion in 1941, 1945, and 1949.

He was born in Åre and competed for Åre SLK, a slalom club which has fostered many Swedish champions.

In 1948 he finished tenth in the alpine skiing slalom event and 30th in the downhill competition.

In 1952 he finished 30th in the giant slalom and 34th in the downhill competition.
