= Enrico Musolino =

Italian speed skater

Personal information
- Nationality: Italian
- Born: 29 August 1928 Milan, Italy
- Died: 14 February 2010 (aged 81) Milan, Italy

Sport
- Sport: Speed skating

Enrico Musolino (29 August 1928 – 14 February 2010) was an Italian speed skater. He competed at the 1948 Winter Olympics and the 1952 Winter Olympics. He last competed on 1 March 1962.
