= Gordon Morrison (alpine skier) =

Canadian alpine skier (1931–1972)

Gordon Douglas Morrison (15 May 1931 – 8 July 1972) was a Canadian alpine skier who competed in the 1952 Winter Olympics.

Morrison died on 8 July 1972 when the plane he was travelling on crashed near Chetwynd, British Columbia, killing the six people on board, including Morrison.
