= Georgi Mitrov =

Bulgarian alpine skier (born 1932)

Personal information
- Nationality: Bulgarian
- Born: 5 November 1932 (age 92)

Sport
- Sport: Alpine skiing

Georgi Mitrov (Bulgarian: Георги Митров, born 5 November 1932) is a Bulgarian alpine skier. He competed in three events at the 1952 Winter Olympics.
