= József Piroska =

Hungarian alpine skier

Personal information
- Nationality: Hungarian
- Born: 20 July 1930; Budapest, Hungary
- Died: 8 May 2020 (aged 89)

Sport
- Sport: Alpine skiing

József Piroska (20 July 1930 – 8 May 2020) was a Hungarian alpine skier. He competed in two events at the 1952 Winter Olympics.
