= Ion Coliban =

Romanian alpine skier (born 1925)

Personal information
- Nationality: Romanian
- Born: 6 June 1925 Brașov, Romania
- Died: 3 October 2001 (aged 76) Bucharest, Romania

Sport
- Sport: Alpine skiing

Ion Coliban (6 June 1925 – 3 October 2001) was a Romanian alpine skier. He competed at the 1948 Winter Olympics and the 1952 Winter Olympics.
