= Ștefan Ghiță =

Romanian alpine skier (born 1926)

Personal information
- Nationality: Romanian
- Born: 16 February 1926; Brașov, Romania

Sport
- Sport: Alpine skiing

Ștefan Ghiță (born 16 February 1926) was a Romanian alpine skier. He competed in two events at the 1952 Winter Olympics.
