= Don McDermott =

American speed skater (1929–2020)

Personal information
- Born: December 7, 1929 The Bronx, New York, U.S.
- Died: November 1, 2020 (aged 90)
Medal record
Men's speed skating
Representing the United States
Olympic Games
Silver medal – second place	1952 Oslo	500 m

Donald Joseph McDermott (December 7, 1929 – November 1, 2020) was an American speed skater. He was born in The Bronx, New York. At the 1952 Olympics in Oslo McDermott was silver medalist in the 500 meters. On November 2, 2020, it was announced that McDermott had died at the age of 90.

Olympic Games
Preceded by Norman Armitage	Flagbearer for United States; Squaw Valley 1960	Succeeded by Rafer Johnson
