= Sukenobu Kudō =

Japanese speed skater (1927–2012)

Personal information
- Born: 11 September 1927 Iwate Prefecture, Japan
- Died: 17 April 2012 (aged 84)

Sport
- Sport: Speed skating

Achievements and titles
- Olympic finals: 1952

Sukenobu Kudō (工藤祐信, Kudō Sukenobu; 11 September 1927 – 17 April 2012) was a Japanese speed skater. He competed at the 1952 Winter Olympics.
