= Radu Scîrneci =

Romanian alpine skier (1926–2015)

Personal information
- Nationality: Romanian
- Born: 20 September 1926; Brașov, Romania
- Died: before 3 August 2015 (aged 88); Poiana Brașov, Romania

Sport
- Sport: Alpine skiing

Radu Scârneci (20 September 1926 − 3 August 2015) was a Romanian alpine skier. He competed at the 1948 Winter Olympics and the 1952 Winter Olympics.

He was the first permanent resident of Poiana Brașov ski resort; the house built in 1933 by his father is the oldest residential house in Poiana Brașov, and is still standing.
