= John Boyagis =

British alpine skier (1928–2020)

Personal information
- Nationality: British
- Born: 26 January 1928 Bombay, British India
- Died: 22 July 2020 (aged 92)

Sport
- Sport: Alpine skiing

John Boyagis (26 January 1928 – 22 July 2020) was a British alpine skier. He competed at the 1948 Winter Olympics and the 1952 Winter Olympics. He died on 22 July 2020 at the age of 92.
