= Dumitru Sulică =

Romanian alpine skier (1921–1987)

Personal information
- Nationality: Romanian
- Born: 16 April 1921; Brașov, Romania
- Died: 1987 (aged 65–66)

Sport
- Sport: Alpine skiing

Dumitru Sulică (16 April 1921 – 1987) was a Romanian alpine skier. He competed at the 1948 Winter Olympics and the 1952 Winter Olympics.
