= Guido Citterio =

Italian speed skater (1931–2025)

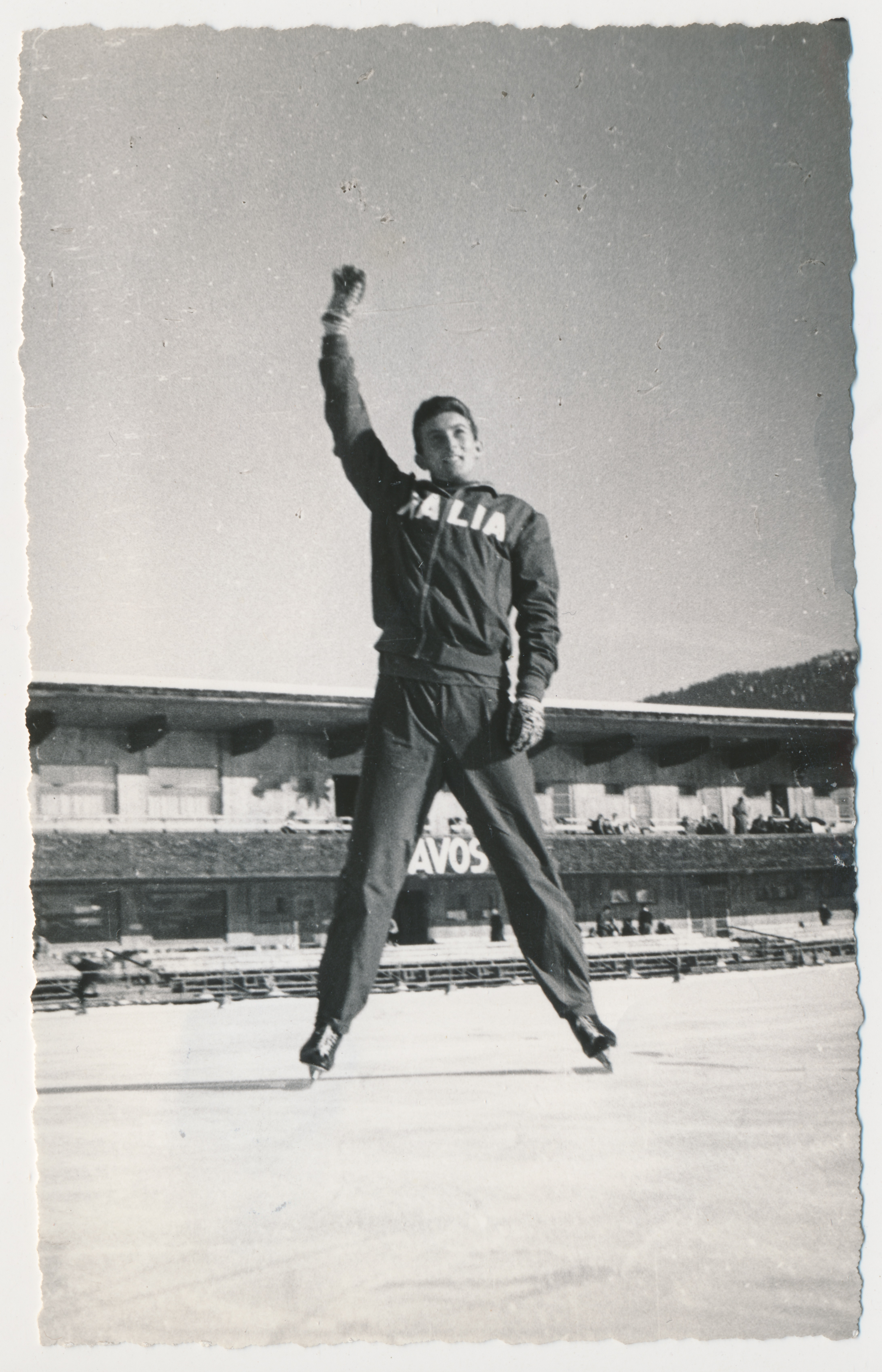
- Citterio in 1951

Personal information
- Nationality: Italian
- Born: 14 July 1931 Milan, Italy
- Died: 27 January 2025 (aged 93)

Sport
- Sport: Speed skating

Guido Citterio (14 July 1931 – 27 January 2025) was an Italian speed skater. He competed at the 1952 Winter Olympics and the 1956 Winter Olympics. Citterio died on 27 January 2025, at the age of 93.
