= Hisashi Mizugami =

Japanese alpine skier

Personal information
- Nationality: Japanese
- Born: 9 July 1925; Otaru, Hokkaido, Japan

Sport
- Sport: Alpine skiing

Hisashi Mizugami (水上 久, Mizugami Hisashi, born 9 July 1925) was a Japanese alpine skier. He competed in three events at the 1952 Winter Olympics.
