= Kees Broekman =

Dutch speed skater (1927–1992)

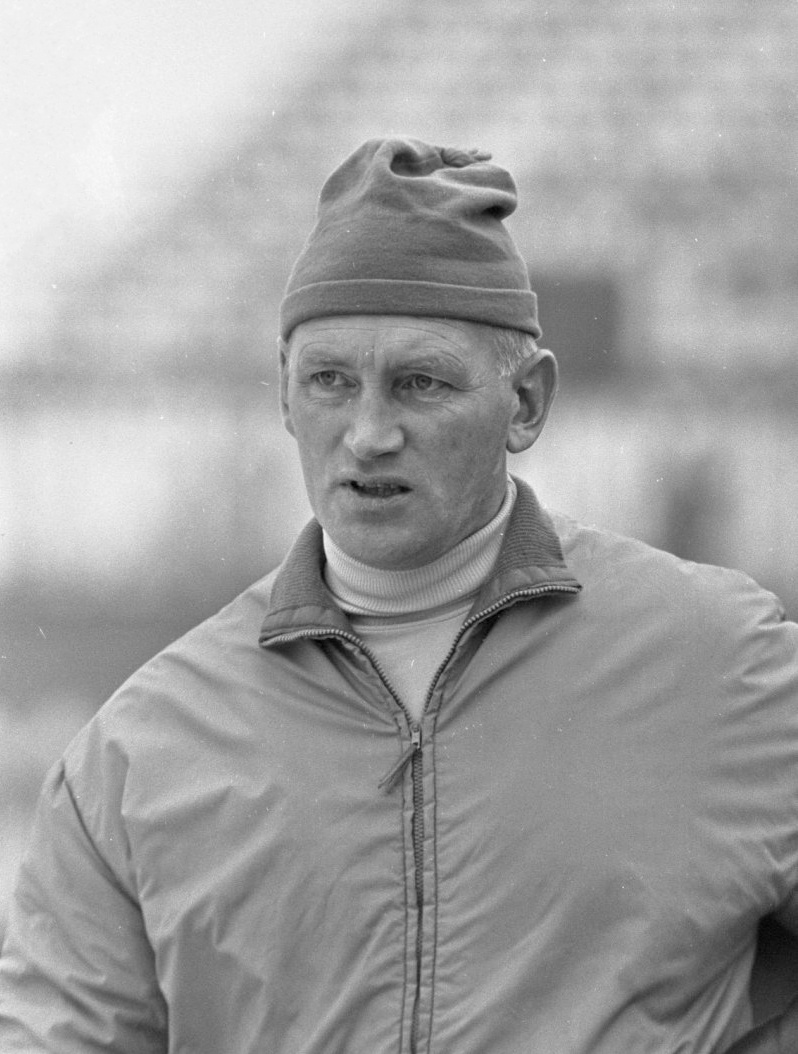
- Kees Broekman in 1968

Personal information
- Born: 2 July 1927 De Lier, Netherlands
- Died: 8 November 1992 (aged 65) Berlin, Germany

Sport
- Country: Netherlands
- Sport: Speed skating
- Retired: 1960

Achievements and titles
- Personal best(s): 500 m: 44.2 (1956); 1000 m: 1:31.6 (1954); 1500 m: 2:13.1 (1956); 3000 m: 4:41.6 (1953); 5000 m: 8:00.2 (1956); 10 000 m: 16:33.5 (1956)
Medal record
Men's speed skating
Representing the Netherlands
Olympic Games
Silver medal – second place	1952 Oslo	5000 m
Silver medal – second place	1952 Oslo	10000 m
World Championships
Silver medal – second place	1949 Oslo	Allround
European Championships
Gold medal – first place	1953 Hamar	Allround
Silver medal – second place	1952 Õstersund	Allround

Cornelis "Kees" Broekman (2 July 1927 – 8 November 1992) was a Dutch speed skater.

At the 1952 Olympics in Oslo Broekman was silver medalist on both the 5000 meter and the 10000 meter, the first ever Winter Olympic medals for the Netherlands. He won a silver medal at the World Allround Speed Skating Championships for Men 1949, and became European champion 1953.

In the 1950s Broekman moved to Norway, where he competed until the 1960 Summer Olympics. After the Games he retired to become a speed skating coach, bringing Atje Keulen-Deelstra and Göran Claeson to world titles. He later coached speed skating in Berlin, where he died at age 65.

He was an uncle of the Olympic speed skater Stien Kaiser.

Olympic Games
Preceded by Wim van der Voort	Flagbearer for Netherlands; Cortina d'Ampezzo 1956; Squaw Valley 1960	Succeeded by Ard Schenk
