= Dick Pappenheim =

Dutch alpine skier (1929–2016)

Personal information
- Full name: Hendrik Pappenheim
- Nationality: Dutch
- Born: 23 June 1929 Amsterdam, Netherlands
- Died: 12 August 2016 (aged 87)

Sport
- Sport: Alpine skiing

Hendrik "Dick" Pappenheim (23 June 1929 – 12 August 2016) was a Dutch alpine skier. He competed in three events at the 1952 Winter Olympics.

== Olympic results ==
Year
Year	Age	Slalom	Giant; Slalom	Super G	Downhill	Combined
1952	22	74	52	—N/a	45	—N/a
