= Peter Pappenheim =

Dutch alpine skier (1926–2021)

Personal information
- Nationality: Dutch
- Born: 19 December 1926; Amsterdam, Netherlands
- Died: 2021 (aged 94–95)

Sport
- Sport: Alpine skiing

Peter Pappenheim (19 December 1926 – 2021) was a Dutch alpine skier and economist. He competed in three events at the 1952 Winter Olympics.

Pappenheim died in 2021.
