= Mihai Bîră =

Romanian alpine skier (1929–2021)

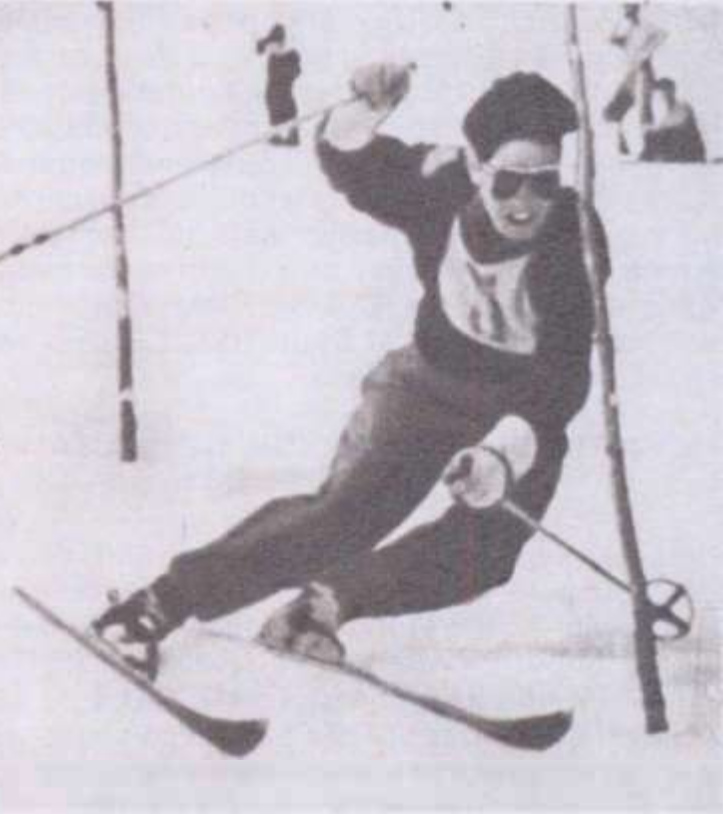

Personal information
- Nationality: Romanian
- Born: 5 September 1929; Brașov, Romania
- Died: March 2021 (aged 91)

Sport
- Sport: Alpine skiing

Mihai Bîră (5 September 1929 – March 2021) was a Romanian alpine skier. He competed at the 1948 Winter Olympics and the 1952 Winter Olympics. His son, Mihai Bîră Jr., competed at the 1984 Winter Olympics.
