= Wim van der Voort =

Dutch speed skater

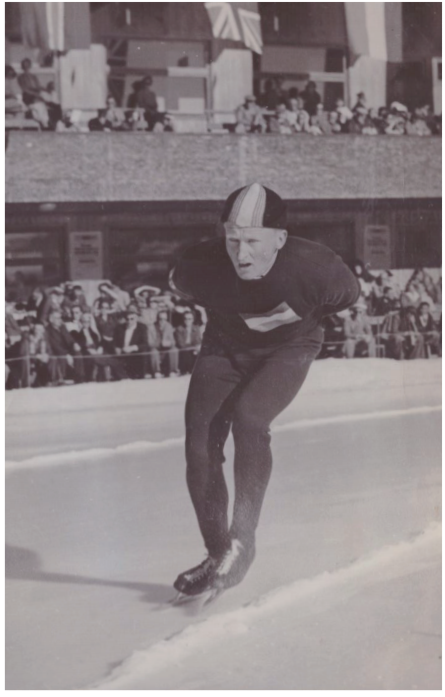
- Wim van der Voort in 1952.

Personal information
- Nationality: Dutch
- Born: 24 March 1923 's-Gravenzande, Netherlands
- Died: 23 October 2016 (aged 93) Delft, Netherlands

Sport
- Country: Netherlands
- Sport: Speed skating
Medal record
Men's speed skating
Representing the Netherlands
Men's Speed skating
Olympic Games
| Silver medal – second place | 1952 Oslo | 1500 m |
World Championships
| Bronze medal – third place | 1953 Helsinki | Allround |
European Championships
| Silver medal – second place | 1951 Oslo | Allround |
| Silver medal – second place | 1953 Hamar | Allround |

Willem "Wim" van der Voort (24 March 1923 – 23 October 2016) was a Dutch speed skater. At the 1952 Olympics in Oslo Van der Voort was the silver medalist in the men's 1500 meters, finishing 0.2 seconds behind Hjalmar Andersen of Norway. He received a bronze medal at the 1953 World Allround Championships, and silver medals at the 1951 and 1953 European Championships.

Olympic Games
| Preceded by Jan Langedijk | Flagbearer for Netherlands; Oslo 1952 | Succeeded by Kees Broekman |
