= Speed skating at the 1952 Winter Olympics =

Speed skating at the VI Olympic Winter Games
- Pictogram for speed skating
- Venue: Bislett Stadium
- Date: 16–19 February 1952
- No. of events: 4
- Competitors: 67 from 14 nations

At the 1952 Winter Olympics, four speed skating events were contested. The competitions were held from Saturday, 16 February to Tuesday, 19 February 1952.

== Medal summary ==
Event	Gold		Silver		Bronze	
500 metres	Ken Henry; United States	43.2	Don McDermott; United States	43.9	Gordon Audley; Canada Arne Johansen; Norway	44.0
1500 metres	Hjalmar Andersen; Norway	2:20.4	Wim van der Voort; Netherlands	2:20.6	Roald Aas; Norway	2:21.6
5000 metres	Hjalmar Andersen; Norway	8:10.6 (OR)	Kees Broekman; Netherlands	8:21.6	Sverre Haugli; Norway	8:22.4
10,000 metres	Hjalmar Andersen; Norway	16:45.8 (OR)	Kees Broekman; Netherlands	17:10.6	Carl-Erik Asplund; Sweden	17:16.6

== Participating nations ==
Seven speed skaters competed in all four events.

A total of 67 speed skaters from 14 nations competed at the Oslo Games:

- Australia (1)
- Austria (3)
- Belgium (3)
- Canada (4)
- Finland (6)
- Germany (1)
- Great Britain (3)
- Hungary (2)
- Italy (3)
- Japan (6)
- Netherlands (7)
- Norway (12)
- Sweden (9)
- United States (7)

== Medal table ==
Rank	Nation	Gold	Silver	Bronze	Total
1	Norway	3	0	3	6
2	United States	1	1	0	2
3	Netherlands	0	3	0	3
4	Canada	0	0	1	1
4	Sweden	0	0	1	1
Totals (5 entries)		4	4	5	13
