= 1952 Winter Olympics =

Multi-sport event in Oslo, Norway

VI Olympic Winter Games
- Emblem of the 1952 Winter Olympics (Note: The emblem is the New Oslo City Hall overlaid by the Olympic rings, and surrounded by the phrase, "The 6th Olympic Winter Games / Oslo 1952".)
- Location: Oslo, Norway
- Nations: 30
- Athletes: 693 (584 men, 109 women)
- Events: 22 in 4 sports (8 disciplines)
- Opening: 14 February 1952
- Closing: 25 February 1952
- Opened by: Princess Ragnhild
- Cauldron: Eigil Nansen
- Stadium: Bislett Stadium

The 1952 Winter Olympics, officially known as the VI Olympic Winter Games (Norwegian: De 6. olympiske vinterleker; Nynorsk: Dei 6. olympiske vinterleikane) and commonly known as Oslo 1952, were a winter multi-sport event held from 14 to 25 February 1952 in Oslo, the capital of Norway.

Discussions about Oslo hosting the Winter Olympic Games began as early as 1935; the city was keen to host the 1948 Winter Olympics, but that was made impossible by World War II. Instead, Oslo won the right to host the 1952 Games in a contest that included Cortina d'Ampezzo in Italy and Lake Placid in the United States. All of the Olympic venues were in Oslo's metropolitan area, except for the alpine skiing events, which were held at Norefjell, 113 km (70 mi) from the capital. A new hotel was built for the press and dignitaries, along with three dormitories to house athletes and coaches, creating the first modern athlete's village. Oslo bore the financial burden of hosting the Games in return for the revenue they generated. The 1952 Winter Olympics was the first of the two consecutive Olympics to be held in Northern Europe, preceding the 1952 Summer Olympics in Helsinki, Finland.

The 1952 Winter Games attracted 694 athletes representing 30 countries, who participated in four sports and 22 events. Japan and Germany made their returns to Winter Olympic competition after being forced to miss the 1948 Games in the aftermath of World War II. Germany was represented solely by West German athletes after East Germany declined to compete as a unified team. Portugal and New Zealand made their Winter Olympic debuts, and women were allowed to compete in cross-country skiing for the first time.

Norwegian truck driver Hjalmar Andersen won three out of four speed skating events to become the most decorated athlete of the 1952 Winter Olympics. Germany resumed its former prominence in bobsleigh, with wins in the four- and two-man events. Dick Button of the United States performed the first triple jump in international competition to claim his second consecutive men's figure skating Olympic title. The popular Nordic sport bandy featured as a demonstration sport, but only three Nordic countries competed in the tournament. Norway dominated the overall medal count with 16 medals, including seven golds. The Games closed with the presentation of a flag that would be passed to the host city of the next Winter Olympics. The flag, which became known as the "Oslo flag", has been displayed in the host city during subsequent Winter Games.

== Host city selection ==
Location of Oslo in Norway

Oslo had unsuccessfully bid to host the 1936 Winter Olympics, losing to Germany, which had hosted the 1936 Summer Olympics. At that time, the nation that hosted the Summer Olympics also hosted the Winter Olympics. After the 1936 Games, the International Olympic Committee (IOC) decided to award the Winter and Summer Games to different countries, but the Games were suspended during World War II. London hosted the first post-war Games, the 1948 Summer Olympics, and recommended Oslo as the host city for the 1948 Winter Games, but the city council declined. Instead, the 1948 Winter Olympics were held in St. Moritz, Switzerland.

Norwegians were undecided about hosting a Winter Olympics. Culturally, they were opposed to competitive winter sports, particularly skiing events, despite the success of Norwegian athletes at previous Winter Games. But the organizers believed the 1952 Games could be an opportunity to promote national unity and to show the world that Norway had recovered from the war. Vying with Oslo for the right to host the Games were Cortina d'Ampezzo, Italy, and Lake Placid, New York, United States. The IOC voted to award the 1952 Winter Games to Oslo on 21 June 1947 at the 40th IOC Session in Stockholm, Sweden. Later, Cortina d'Ampezzo was awarded the 1956 Games, and Lake Placid—which had hosted the 1932 Winter Olympics—was chosen to host the 1980 Winter Games. Norway became the first Scandinavian country to host a Winter Olympics, and the 1952 Winter Games were the first to be held in a nation's capital.

=== Results ===
1952 Winter Olympics bidding result
City	Country	Round 1
Oslo	Norway	17
Cortina d'Ampezzo	Italy	9
Lake Placid	United States	1

== Organization ==
A special committee was assigned to organize the 1952 Games, which consisted of four Norwegian sports officials and four representatives from the municipality of Oslo, including mayor Brynjulf Bull. The committee was in place by December 1947. The city of Oslo funded the Games entirely, in exchange for keeping all the revenue generated. To accommodate the influx of athletes and coaches, quarters for competitors and support staff were designed and constructed, with three new facilities (forerunners of the athlete's villages of later Games) built. The city of Oslo paid to have a new hotel constructed, the Viking, used for IOC delegates, out-of-town dignitaries, and as the communication hub of the Games. For the first time in a Winter Games, an indoor ice hockey arena was constructed, which hosted the eight-team tournament. Oslo's existing central arena, Bislett Stadium, was used for the opening and closing ceremonies, and for speed skating events. Improvements to the arena included better sound and lighting systems, remodeled club house and press rooms, and the addition of a medical center.

== Politics ==
In the aftermath of the German occupation of Norway during World War II, anti-German sentiment began to affect preparations for the 1952 Olympics. Discussions were held to consider whether Germany should be allowed to participate in the Games. When in 1950, the West German Olympic Committee requested recognition by the IOC, it raised the question of whether their participation would cause political boycotts in the upcoming Games. Once the IOC recognized the West German Olympic Committee, West Germany was then formally invited to compete at the 1952 Winter Games. East Germany was invited to participate with West Germany, as a unified team, but they declined.

At first Norway was reluctant to welcome German athletes and others considered Nazi sympathizers. For example, Norwegian speed skater Finn Hodt was not allowed to compete in the Norwegian speed skating team because he collaborated with the Nazis during the war. Eventually, despite the concern, Norway agreed to allow German and Japanese athletes to compete. The Soviet Union sent no athletes to Oslo, despite being recognized by the IOC, sending observers instead.

== Events ==
Medals were awarded in 22 events contested in four sports (eight disciplines).

- Bobsleigh (2) ()
- Ice hockey (1) ()
- Skating
  - Figure skating (3) ()
  - Speed skating (4) ()
- Skiing
  - Alpine skiing (6) ()
  - Nordic skiing ()
    - Cross-country skiing (4) ()
    - Nordic combined (1) ()
    - Ski jumping (1) ()

=== Demonstration sport ===
Bandy was held as a demonstration sport. Sweden, Norway and Finland participated with their best players and won one match each. This was the first official international bandy tournament since 1913.

=== Opening ceremonies ===
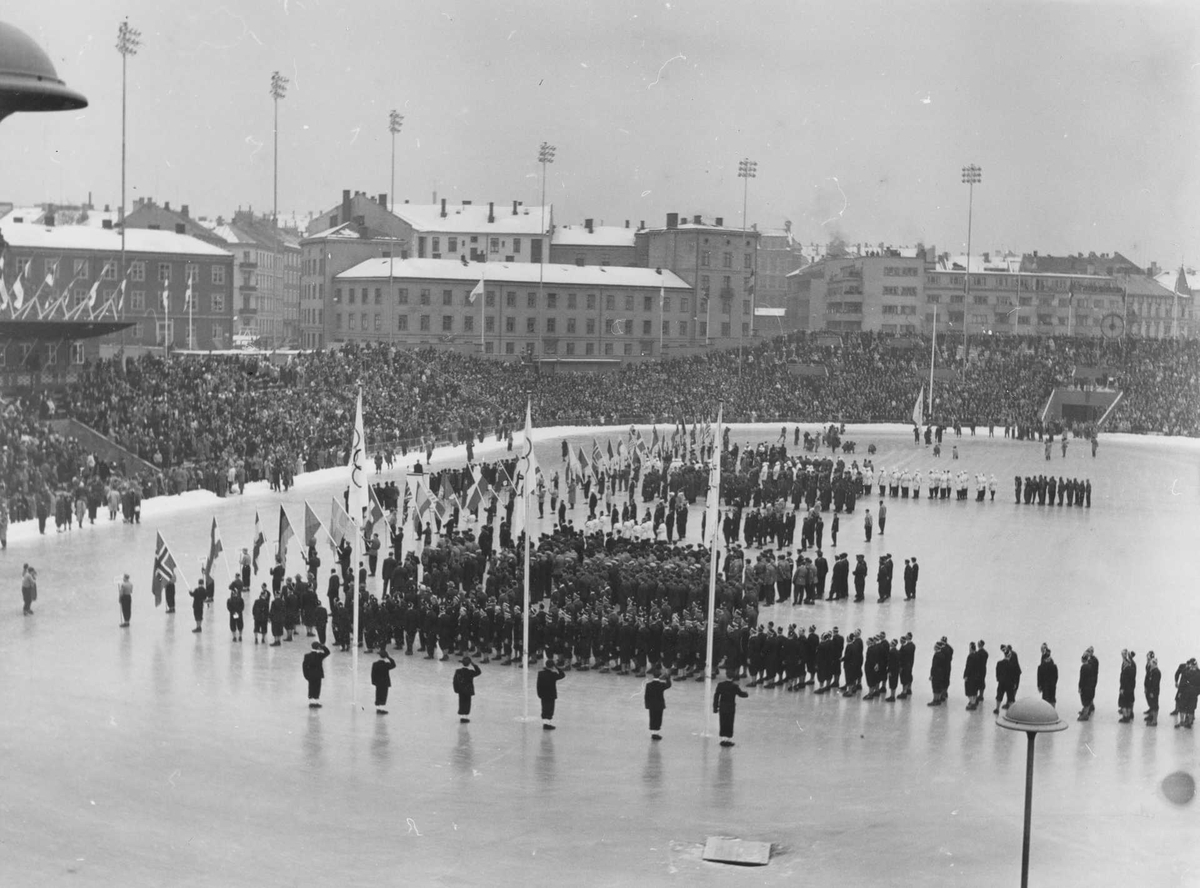
A scene from the opening ceremony at Bislett Stadium

The opening ceremonies were held in Bislett Stadium on 15 February. King George VI of Great Britain had died on 6 February 1952 with his daughter Elizabeth II taking the throne as Queen, eight days before the start of the Games. As a result, all national flags were flown at half-mast, and Princess Ragnhild opened the Games in place of her grandfather, King Haakon VII, who was in London attending the state funeral. This was the first time an Olympic Games had been declared open by a female official. The parade of nations was held according to tradition, with Greece first and the rest of the nations proceeding by alphabetical order in the Norwegian language, with the host nation last. The British, Australian, Canadian and New Zealand teams all wore black arm bands at the opening ceremonies in memory of their monarch. Following the parade of nations, the Olympic flame was lit. On 13 February, at the start of the inaugural Winter Olympics torch relay, the torch was lit in the hearth of the Morgedal House, birthplace of skiing pioneer Sondre Norheim. The torch relay lasted two days and was conducted entirely on skis. At the opening ceremonies the final torch bearer, Eigil Nansen, received the Olympic torch and skied to a flight of stairs where he removed his skis, ascended, and ignited the flame.

The bobsleigh and alpine skiing events were held the day before the opening ceremonies. Competitors in these events were unable to attend the festivities in Oslo; consequently simple opening ceremonies were held at Frognerseteren, site of the bobsleigh events, and Norefjell, site of the alpine skiing events.

=== Bobsleigh ===
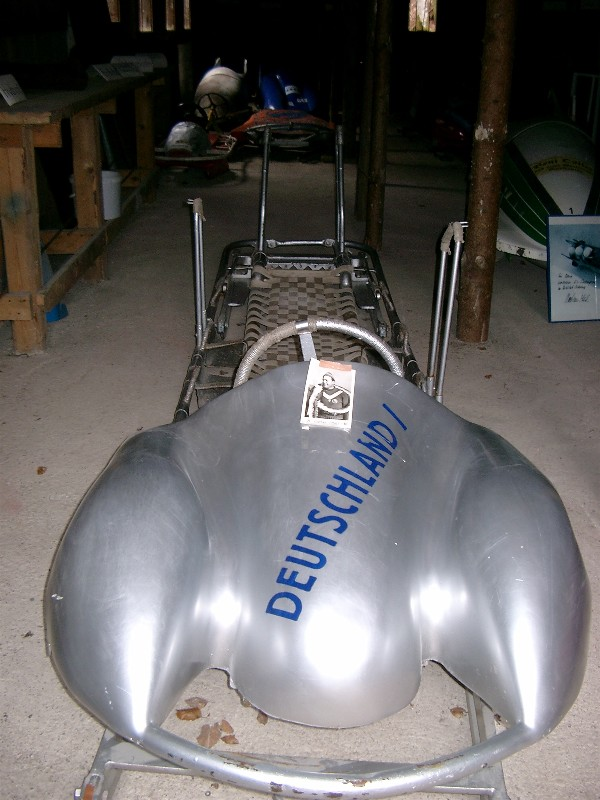
The gold medal-winning four-man bobsleigh from Germany

After a 16-year hiatus from the Olympics, Germany made a triumphant return to the bobsleigh competition, winning the two- and four-man events. The results for both bobsleigh events were the same, with the United States and Switzerland taking silver and bronze respectively. Fritz Feierabend from Switzerland competed in both the two- and four-man competitions. His two bronze medals were the fourth and fifth in an Olympic career that spanned 16 years and three Olympics. There were no weight restrictions on the bobsleigh athletes, and the average weight for each member of the winning German four-man team was 117 kg (258 lb), which was more than the Olympic heavyweight boxing champion in 1952. Seeing the undue advantage overweight athletes brought to their teams, the International Federation for Bobsleigh and Toboganning instituted a weight limit for future Olympics.

=== Speed skating ===
All of the speed skating events were held at Bislett Stadium. Americans Ken Henry and Don McDermott placed first and second in the 500-meter race, but Norwegian truck driver Hjalmar Andersen electrified the partisan crowd by winning the 1,500, 5,000 and 10,000-meter events; his margins of victory were the largest in Olympic history. Dutchman Wim van der Voort placed second in the 1,500 meters and his countryman Kees Broekman placed second to Andersen in the 5,000 and 10,000-meter races, becoming the first Olympic speed skating medalists from the Netherlands. Absent from the competition was former world champion Kornél Pajor. The Hungarian-born speed skater had won both long-distance races at the World Championships held in Oslo in 1949 and then defected to Sweden, but was unable to obtain Swedish citizenship in time to compete in 1952.

=== Alpine skiing ===
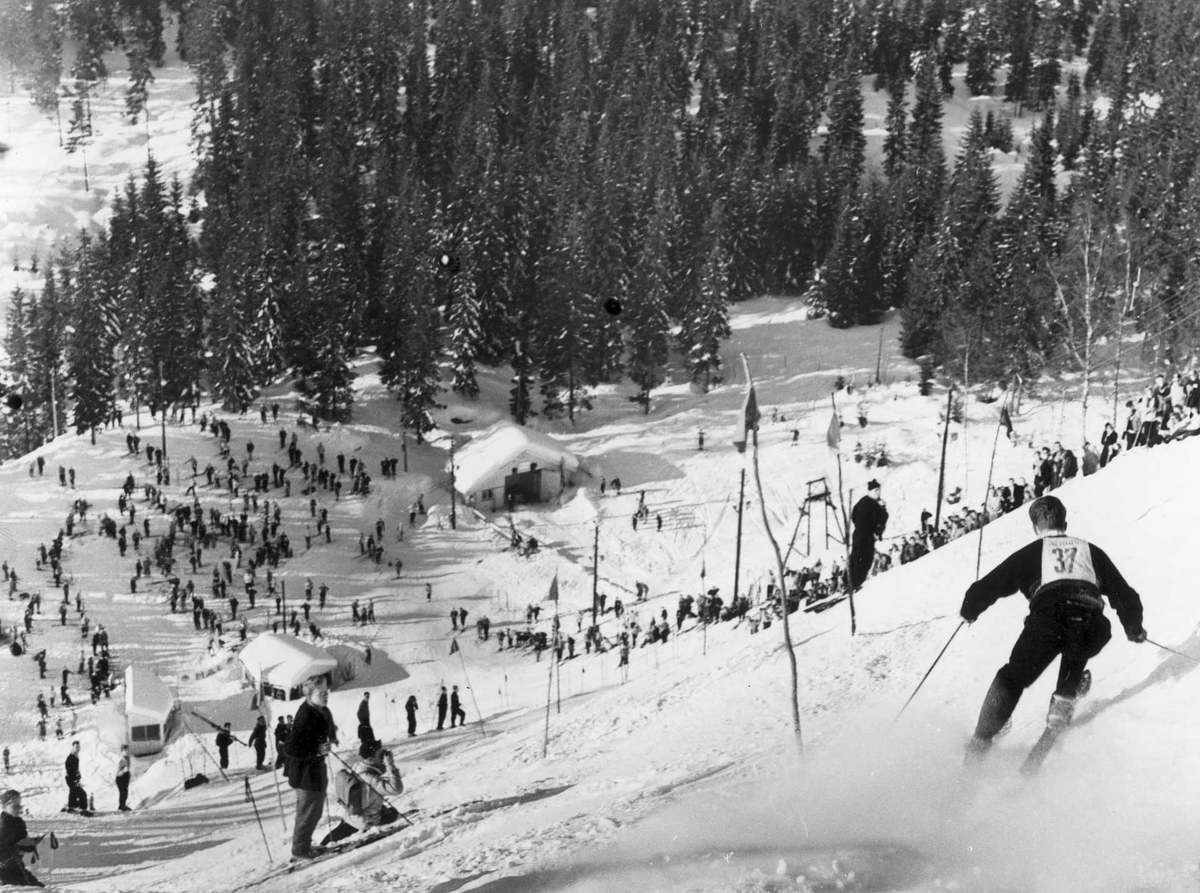
Stein Eriksen in the alpine skiing during the Olympics

There were three alpine skiing events on the Olympic program: the slalom, giant slalom and downhill. Both men and women competed in all three events, held at Norefjell and Rødkleiva. The giant slalom made its Olympic debut at the 1952 Games. Austrian skiers dominated the competition, winning seven out of a possible 18 medals, including Othmar Schneider who won gold and silver in the men's slalom and downhill. Norwegian Stein Eriksen won gold in the men's giant slalom and silver in the slalom. Greek slalom skier Antoin Miliordos fell 18 times on his run and crossed the finish line backwards. American skier Andrea Mead Lawrence was the only double gold medalist, winning the giant slalom and the slalom. She was the first skier from the United States to win two alpine skiing gold medals.

=== Cross-country skiing ===
All the cross-country events were held next to the ski jump hill at Holmenkollbakken. As had been the case in 1948 there were three men's events: 18 kilometers, 50 kilometers, and a relay. Added to the Olympic program for the first time was a ten-kilometer race for women. All the cross-country medals were won by Nordic countries, and Finnish skiers won eight of the twelve possible. Lydia Wideman of Finland became the first female Olympic champion in cross-country skiing; her teammates Mirja Hietamies and Siiri Rantanen won silver and bronze respectively. Veikko Hakulinen won the 50-kilometer men's race to begin an Olympic career that would culminate in seven medals, three of them gold. Hallgeir Brenden won the 18-kilometer race and helped Norway take the silver in the 4 × 10-kilometer relay. Brenden went on to win another gold in the men's 15-kilometer race in 1956, and a silver in the relay in 1960.

=== Nordic combined ===
The Nordic combined event was held at the cross-country and ski jump venues. For the first time, the ski jump part took place first with competitors taking three jumps from the Holmenkollbakken. The 18-km cross country skiing event took place the next day. Results were tallied by the best two marks were scored, along with the results of the cross-country race, to determine a winner. Norwegians Simon Slåttvik and Sverre Stenersen won the gold and bronze respectively. Stenersen went on to win the gold at the 1956 Games in the same event. Heikki Hasu from Finland won the silver, preventing a Norwegian sweep of the medals.

=== Ski jumping ===
Crowds in excess of 100,000 greeted the ski jumpers as they competed at Holmenkollbakken. In 1952 there was only one event, the men's normal hill, which was held on 24 February. The King, Prince Harald, and Princess Ragnhild were in attendance. The Norwegian athletes did not disappoint the crowd, as Arnfinn Bergmann and Torbjørn Falkanger placed first and second; Swedish jumper Karl Holmström took the bronze. Norwegian athletes won the ski jumping gold medal in every Winter Olympics from 1924 to 1952.

=== Figure skating ===
There were three events in the Olympic figure skating competition: men's singles, women's singles and mixed pairs. The events were held at Bislett Stadium on a rink constructed inside the speed skating track.

Dick Button of the United States won the men's singles event. Helmut Seibt of Austria took silver and James Grogan of the United States won bronze. Button became the first figure-skater to land a triple jump in competition when he performed the triple loop in the men's free skate. British skater Jeannette Altwegg won the gold medal in the women's singles, the silver was won by American Tenley Albright, who went on to win gold at the 1956 Winter Games in Cortina d'Ampezzo, and Jacqueline du Bief of France won the bronze. The German husband and wife pair of Ria and Paul Falk won the mixed pairs competition. They defeated Americans Karol and Peter Kennedy, who placed second, and Hungarian siblings Marianna and László Nagy, who won the bronze medal.

=== Ice hockey ===
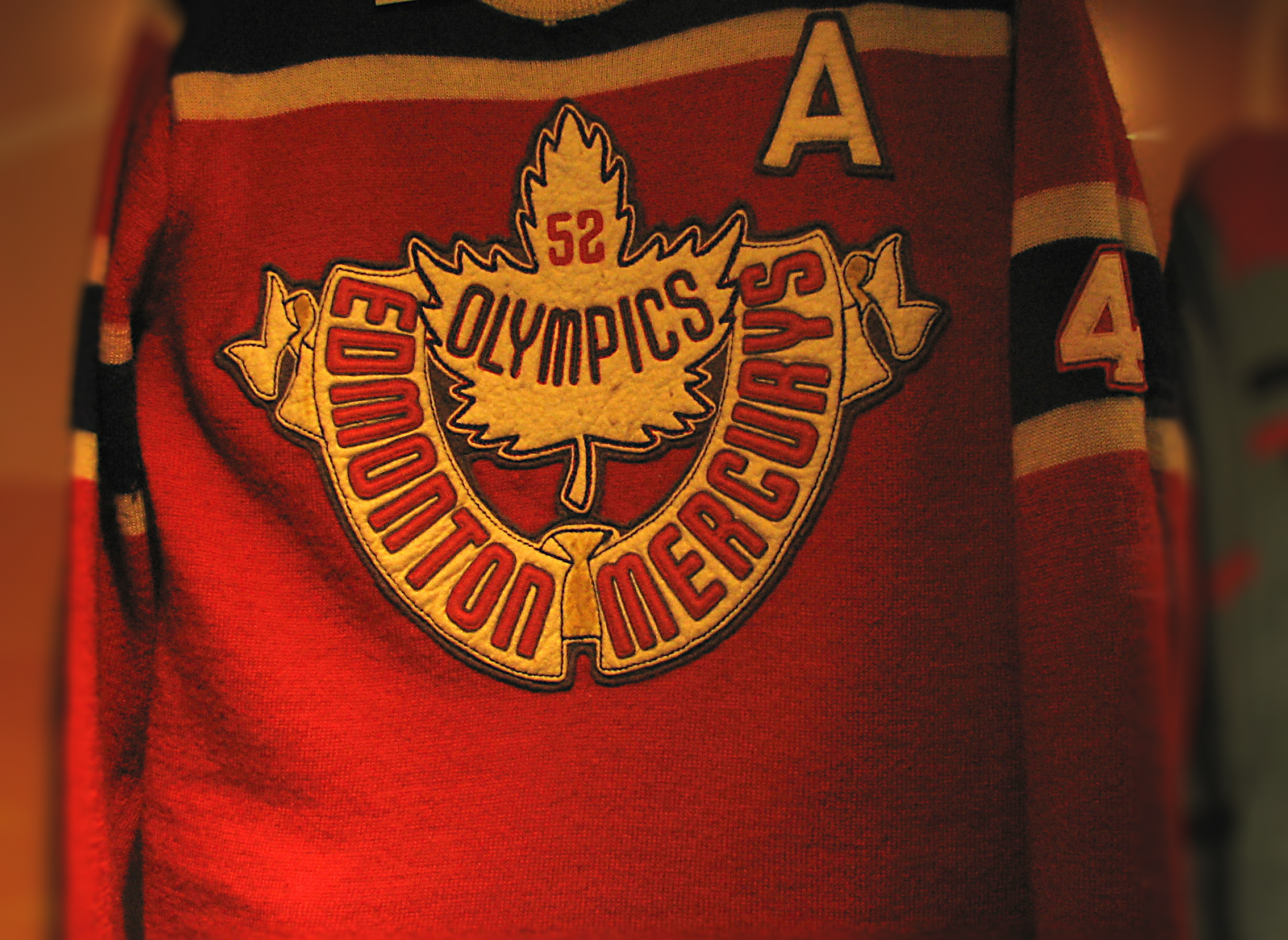
The jersey of Canada's Edmonton Mercurys, the ice hockey gold medal winners

A majority of the ice hockey matches took place at Jordal Amfi, a new hockey stadium built for the Olympics. Nine teams played in the tournament and Canada again won the gold medal. Canada had won all but one Olympic hockey tournament thus far, but in 1956 the Soviet team began to compete and ended Canadian dominance. Canada was represented by the Edmonton Mercurys, an amateur hockey team sponsored by the owner of a Mercury automobile dealership. Canada played the United States to a three all tie on the final day to clinch the gold, and the Americans won silver. The official report of the USOC for the 1952 Olympics covers the game in great detail. According to the report, by the end of the game against Canada, the Americans were mentally and physically exhausted and after scoring the third goal and tying the game they decided to focus on defense in order not to lose silver. Canadians at the time were considered unbeatable. Sweden and Czechoslovakia ended up tied for third (Czechoslovakia defeated the Swedes in the head-to-head game, but according to the rules at the time they had to play a tiebreaker game because they were tied in points). Sweden won that game and avenged the loss in the round-robin. The Czechs believed they had already won the bronze when they defeated the Swedes in the round-robin, calling the decision to play a tie-breaking game a "plot of the capitalist countries". Canadian team was criticized for its rough play; although body checking was legal, it was not often used by European teams, and opponents and spectators alike took a dim view of that style of play.

=== Bandy ===
The IOC lobbied the organizing committee to host either military patrol or curling as a demonstration sport. The committee instead selected bandy, which had never been included in the Winter Games. Popular in Nordic countries, bandy is played by teams of eleven on an outdoor soccer field-sized ice rink, using a small ball and sticks about 1.2 m (3.9 ft) long. As it was a demonstration sport, the players were ineligible for medals. Three nations participated: Finland, Norway and Sweden. Each of the three teams won one game and lost one game; with Sweden winning the competition based on number of goals scored, followed by Norway in second place, and Finland in third place. Two of the games were played at Dæhlenenga Stadium and one at Bislett Stadium.

=== Closing ceremonies ===
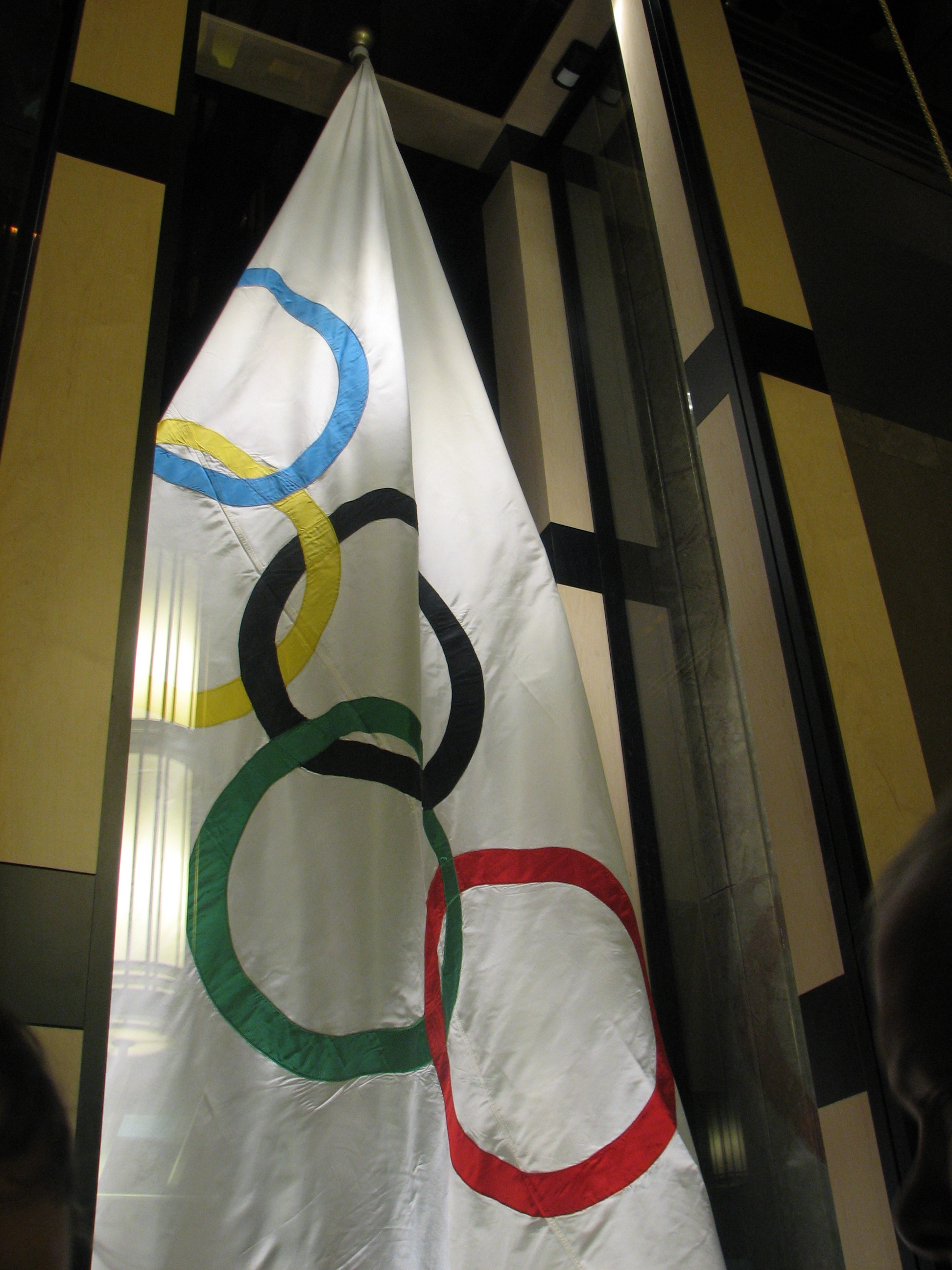
The "Oslo flag"

At the 1952 Winter Games, the closing ceremonies were a distinct program listing, unlike previous Winter Games when the closing ceremonies were held directly after the final event. The closing ceremonies were held in Bislett Stadium, on Monday evening, 25 February. The flag bearers entered the stadium in the same order they followed for the opening ceremonies. That evening four medal ceremonies were also held for the women's cross-country race, the men's cross-country relay, the ski jumping competition, and the ice hockey tournament.

Since 1920, the "Antwerp flag" has been passed from host city to host city during closing ceremonies for the Summer Games. The city of Oslo gave an Olympic flag to establish the same tradition for the Winter Games. Brynjulf Bull, Oslo's mayor, passed the flag to the president of the IOC, Sigfrid Edström, who declared the flag was to pass from host city to host city for future Winter Games. The flag, which came to be known as the "Oslo Flag", has since been preserved in a display case, with the name of every Winter Olympics host city engraved on brass plaques, and is brought to each Winter Games to be displayed. A replica is used during the closing ceremonies.

After the flag ceremony the Olympic flame was extinguished, a special speed skating race was held, and the figure skating competitors gave an exhibition, followed by 40 children dressed in national costumes performing an ice dance. For a finale, to the close the Games, the lights were extinguished and a 20-minute fireworks display lit up the night sky.

== Venues ==
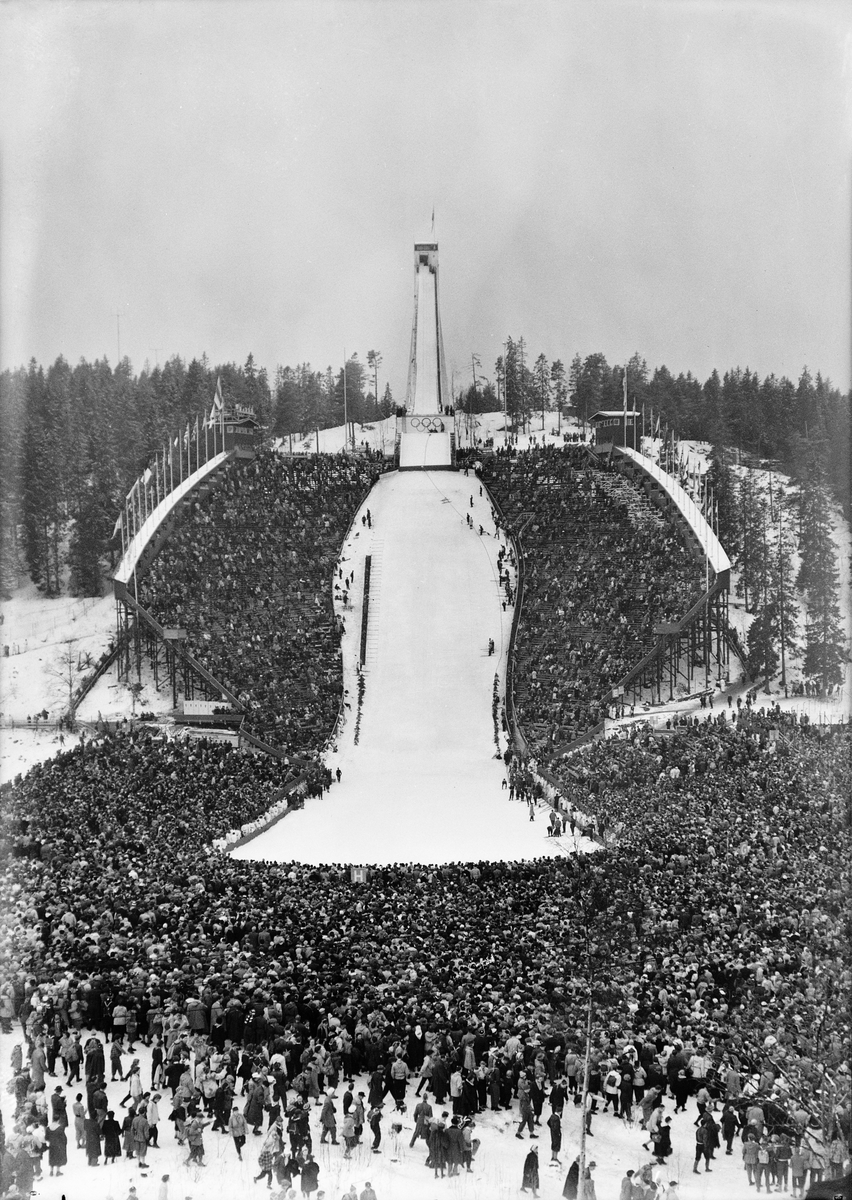
Holmenkollbakken ski jumping hill during the Olympics

With a seating capacity of 29,000, Bislett Stadium became the centrepiece of the Games. It was the venue for the speed skating events and the figure skating competition. Bislett was large enough for a 400 m (1,300 ft) speed skating track, and a figure skating ice-rink of 30 by 60 m (98 by 197 ft); a snow bank separated the track and the rink. Because Bislett was an outdoor arena, the organizing committee chose Tryvann Stadion and Hamar Stadion as secondary alternative skating venues to be used the case of bad weather. In 1994 Hamar became the venue for the speed skating events at the 1994 Winter Olympics in Lillehammer.

The Oslo Winter Games were the first to feature an Olympic ice hockey tournament held on artificial ice. A new stadium was built for the hockey tournament in a residential area of eastern Oslo, called Jordal Amfi, which accommodated 10,000 spectators in stands rising steeply from the rink. 23 of the 36 hockey matches were played at Jordal Amfi, with the remaining matches played at Kadettangen, Dælenenga idrettspark, Lillestrøm Stadion and Marienlyst Stadion.

The cross-country races and ski-jump competition were held at Holmenkollbakken, located roughly 8 km (5 mi) from the center of Oslo. The expected number of spectators caused concerns about traffic, so a new road was constructed and the existing thoroughfare widened. Holmenkollbakken was built in 1892 and improvements were needed to meet international standards. The original wood ski-jump was replaced with a concrete tower and jump that was 87 m (285 ft) long. New stands were built to seat 13,000 people, and an area was added at the base of the hill to accommodate 130,000 spectators.

The hills and terrain in the surrounding area met the competitive demands for an elite cross-country ski event. A notice board was posted at the start and finish lines to help spectators monitor the progress of the competitors. The cross-country and Nordic combined races began and ended at the base of the ski jump hill. The stands for the ski jump competition had to be removed during the cross-country races; spectators had only a small area from which to watch the races but were allowed on the course to cheer on the competitors.

The alpine skiing events were split between Norefjell and Rødkleiva. The slalom courses were at Rødkleiva, located on the same mountain as Holmenkollen and Frognerseteren. The course had an elevation difference, from start to finish, of 200 m (660 ft) and was 480 m (1,570 ft) in length. A rope tow had to be built to bring the skiers from the bottom to the top of the hill. The downhill race and the giant slalom—which made its Olympic debut in 1952—were held at Norefjell, which was 113 km (70 mi) from Oslo and the only venue located away from the capital city. Work had to be done to make the area suitable for Olympic competition. A bridge across Lake Krøderen was built to help alleviate transportation congestion. A new hotel, two ski lifts, and a new road were also constructed.

There was no permanent bobsleigh run in Norway. Instead the organizers built a temporary course out of snow and ice. This is often wrongly assumed to have been built at Korketrekkeren. From Frognerseteren a separate 1,508 m (4,948 ft) long, 13-turn course was designed and built. The bobsleigh run was first constructed and tested in 1951, then rebuilt for the Games in 1952. A car was used to return the bobsleighs to the start of the track.

== Participating nations ==
Thirty nations sent competitors, which was the highest number of participants at a Winter Games. New Zealand and Portugal took part in the Winter Olympic Games for the first time. Australia, Germany, and Japan returned after a 16-year absence. South Korea, Liechtenstein, and Turkey competed in 1948 but did not participate in the 1952 Games.

Participating National Olympic Committees
- Argentina (12)
- Australia (9)
- Austria (39)
- Belgium (9)
- Bulgaria (10)
- Canada (39)
- Chile (3)
- Czechoslovakia (22)
- Denmark (1)
- Finland (50)
- France (26)
- Germany (53)
- Great Britain (18)
- Greece (3)
- Hungary (12)
- Iceland (11)
- Italy (33)
- Japan (13)
- Lebanon (1)
- Netherlands (11)
- New Zealand (3)
- Norway (73) (host)
- Poland (30)
- Portugal (1)
- Romania (16)
- Spain (4)
- Sweden (65)
- Switzerland (55)
- United States (65)
- Yugoslavia (6)

=== Number of athletes by National Olympic Committees ===
IOC Letter Code	Country	Athletes
NOR	Norway	73
SWE	Sweden	65
USA	United States	65
SUI	Switzerland	55
GER	Germany	53
FIN	Finland	50
AUT	Austria	39
CAN	Canada	39
ITA	Italy	33
POL	Poland	30
FRA	France	26
TCH	Czechoslovakia	22
GBR	Great Britain	18
ROU	Romania	16
JPN	Japan	13
ARG	Argentina	12
HUN	Hungary	12
ISL	Iceland	11
NED	Netherlands	11
BUL	Bulgaria	10
AUS	Australia	9
BEL	Belgium	9
YUG	Yugoslavia	6
ESP	Spain	4
CHI	Chile	3
GRE	Greece	3
NZL	New Zealand	3
DEN	Denmark	1
LIB	Lebanon	1
POR	Portugal	1
Total		694

== Calendar ==
All dates are in Central European Time (UTC+1)

The official opening ceremonies were held on 15 February, although two smaller ceremonies were held on 14 February to conform with competition schedules. From 15 February until 25 February, the day of the closing ceremonies, at least one event final was held each day.

OC	Opening ceremonies	●	Event competitions	1	Event finals	CC	Closing ceremonies

February	14 Thu	15 Fri	16 Sat	17 Sun	18 Mon	19 Tue	20 Wed	21 Thu	22 Fri	23 Sat	24 Sun	25 Mon	Events
Ceremonies		OC										CC	—N/a
Bobsleigh	●	1						●	1				2
Ice hockey		●	●	●	●	●	●	●	●	●	●	1	1
Figure skating			●	●		●	1	1	1				3
Speed skating			1	1	1	1							4
Alpine skiing	1	1	1	1		1	1						6
Cross-country skiing					1		1			2			4
Nordic combined				●	1								1
Ski jumping											1		1
Demonstration sport
Bandy						●	●		1				1
Daily medal events	1	2	2	3	2	2	3	1	2	2	1	1	22
Cumulative total	1	3	5	7	10	12	15	16	18	20	21	22	22
February	14 Thu	15 Fri	16 Sat	17 Sun	18 Mon	19 Tue	20 Wed	21 Thu	22 Fri	23 Sat	24 Sun	25 Mon	Total events

== Medal count ==
These are the nations that topped the medal count at the 1952 Winter Games.

* Host nation (Norway)

Rank	Nation	Gold	Silver	Bronze	Total
1	Norway*	7	3	6	16
2	United States	4	6	1	11
3	Finland	3	4	2	9
4	Germany	3	2	2	7
5	Austria	2	4	2	8
6	Canada	1	0	1	2
6	Italy	1	0	1	2
8	Great Britain	1	0	0	1
9	Netherlands	0	3	0	3
10	Sweden	0	0	4	4
11	Switzerland	0	0	2	2
12	France	0	0	1	1
12	Hungary	0	0	1	1
Totals (13 entries)		22	22	23	67

=== Podium sweeps ===
Date	Sport	Event	NOC	Gold	Silver	Bronze
23 February	Cross-country skiing	Women's 10 kilometre	Finland	Lydia Wideman	Mirja Hietamies	Siiri Rantanen

== See also ==
- 1952 Summer Olympics
- List of 1952 Winter Olympics medal winners

== Notes ==
Winter Olympics
Preceded by St. Moritz	VI Olympic Winter Games; Oslo; 1952	Succeeded by Cortina d'Ampezzo
