= Cross-country skiing at the 1952 Winter Olympics – Men's 18 kilometre =

Men's 18 kilometre events at the none

Men's 18 kilometre at the VI Olympic Winter Games
- Cross-country skiing
- Venue: Holmenkollen
- Date: February 18, 1952
- Competitors: 80 from 18 nations
- Winning time: 1:01:34

Medalists
1st place, gold medalist(s)		Hallgeir Brenden	Norway
2nd place, silver medalist(s)		Tapio Mäkelä	Finland
3rd place, bronze medalist(s)		Paavo Lonkila	Finland

The 18 kilometre Cross-country skiing event was part of the cross-c skiing programme at the 1952 Winter Olympics. It was the sixth appearance of the event. The competition was held on Monday, 18 February 1952. Eighty cross-country skiers from 18 nations competed.

== Medalists ==
Gold	Silver	Bronze
Hallgeir Brenden; Norway	Tapio Mäkelä; Finland	Paavo Lonkila; Finland

== Results ==
Rank	Athlete	Time	
Rank	Athlete	At 7 km	Final
1	Hallgeir Brenden (NOR)	27:00	1'01:34
2	Tapio Mäkelä (FIN)	26:50	1'02:09
3	Paavo Lonkila (FIN)	27:00	1'02:20
4	Heikki Hasu (FIN)	27:05	1'02:24
5	Nils Karlsson (SWE)	27:00	1'02:56
6	Martin Stokken (NOR)	27:05	1'03:00
7	Nils Täpp (SWE)	27:40	1'03:35
8	Tauno Sipilä (FIN)	27:30	1'03:40
9	Gunnar Östberg (SWE)	27:35	1'03:44
10	Toivo Oikarinen (FIN)	27:40	1'04:07
11	Magnar Estenstad (NOR)	28:00	1'04:26
12	Mikal Kirkholt (NOR)	27:50	1'04:53
13	Enar Josefsson (SWE)	28:15	1'05:10
14	Paavo Korhonen (FIN)	28:00	1'05:30
15	Simon Slåttvik (NOR)	28:15	1'05:40
16	Aulis Sipponen (FIN)	28:30	1'06:03
17	Ottar Gjermundshaug (NOR)	28:30	1'06:13
18	René Mandrillon (FRA)	29:00	1'06:48
19	Federico Deflorian (ITA)	28:50	1'06:54
20	Per Gjelten (NOR)	29:40	1'07:40
21	Eeti Nieminen (FIN)	29:30	1'08:24
22	Kenichi Yamamoto (JPN)	29:55	1'08:49
23	Josef Schneeberger (AUT)	29:50	1'09:12
24	Arrigo Delladio (ITA)	30:00	1'09:17
24	Gérard Perrier (FRA)	30:05	1'09:17
26	Alfons Supersaxo (SUI)	30:20	1'09:38
27	Sverre Stenersen (NOR)	29:50	1'09:44
28	Matthias Noichl (AUT)	30:00	1'09:48
29	Vlastimil Melich (TCH)	30:20	1'10:09
30	Alfred Kronig (SUI)	30:30	1'10:12
31	Hans Eder (AUT)	30:05	1'10:13
32	Gunnar Pétursson (ISL)	30:30	1'10:30
33	Jacques Perrier (FRA)	29:40	1'10:33
34	Giacomo Mosele (ITA)	30:30	1'10:36
35	Walter Lötscher (SUI)	30:20	1'10:45
36	Ottavio Compagnoni (ITA)	29:20	1'10:50
37	Josef Schnyder (SUI)	30:35	1'10:51
38	Alfredo Prucker (ITA)	30:50	1'10:56
39	Constantin Enache (ROU)	30:40	1'11:00
40	Ebenezer Thorarinsson (ISL)	30:30	1'11:10
41	Tadeusz Kwapień (POL)	30:40	1'11:40
42	Boris Stoev (BUL)	30:25	1'11:46
43	Theodore A. Farwell (USA)	30:55	1'11:54
43	Friedrich Krischan (AUT)	30:40	1'11:54
45	Jón Kristjánsson (ISL)	31:00	1'12:05
46	Karl Briker (SUI)	30:55	1'12:19
47	Vladimír Šimůnek (TCH)	31:10	1'12:34
48	Oskar Schulz (AUT)	30:40	1'12:37
49	Vasil Gruev (BUL)	32:00	1'12:43
50	Ivan Staykov (BUL)	31:10	1'12:47
51	Leopold Kohl (AUT)	31:50	1'13:10
52	Claude Lavoie Richer (CAN)	31:30	1'13:17
53	Pál Sajgó (HUN)	31:45	1'13:25
54	Heinz Hauser (GER)	32:30	1'13:30
55	Oddur Pétursson (ISL)	31:05	1'13:35
56	Erik Elmsäter (SWE)	31:40	1'13:46
57	Wendell Broomhall (USA)	31:20	1'14:06
58	Lars-Erik Efverström (SWE)	31:50	1'14:19
59	Alois Harrer (GER)	32:05	1'14:23
60	Petar Kovachev (BUL)	32:05	1'14:35
61	Ryoichi Fujisawa (JPN)	33:00	1'14:41
61	Moise Crăciun (ROU)	32:40	1'14:41
63	Florea Lepădatu (ROU)	32:30	1'15:42
64	Rudi Kopp (GER)	32:00	1'15:53
65	Albert Mohr (GER)	32:40	1'16:32
66	Thomas M. Jacobs (USA)	33:00	1'16:43
67	John C. Burton (USA)	33:00	1'16:47
68	Niculae-Cornel Crăciun (ROU)	34:00	1'17:11
69	Sepp Schiffner (AUT)	32:05	1'17:31
70	Jacques Carbonneau (CAN)	33:30	1'17:37
71	George Hovland (USA)	33:40	1'18:05
72	Robert W. Pidacks (USA)	34:10	1'18:25
73	John H. Caldwell (USA)	36:20	1'25:42
74	Bruce Haslingden (AUS)	38:10	1'29:58
75	Cedric Sloane (AUS)	40:20	1'32:39
-	Štefan Kovalčík (TCH)	30:35	DNF
-	Benoît Carrara (FRA)	29:00	DNF
-	Helmut Böck (GER)	32:20	DNF
-	Hubert Egger (GER)	DNF	-
-	Peter Radacher (AUT)	DNF	-
