= Finland at the 1952 Winter Olympics =

- IOC code: FIN
- NOC: Finnish Olympic Committee
- Website: sport.fi/olympiakomitea (in Finnish and Swedish)

in Oslo
- Competitors: 50 (45 men, 5 women) in 7 sports
- Flag bearer: Heikki Hasu (Nordic combined)
- Medals Ranked 3rd: Gold 3 Silver 4 Bronze 2 Total 9

Winter Olympics appearances (overview)
- 1924; 1928; 1932; 1936; 1948; 1952; 1956; 1960; 1964; 1968; 1972; 1976; 1980; 1984; 1988; 1992; 1994; 1998; 2002; 2006; 2010; 2014; 2018; 2022; 2026

Finland competed at the 1952 Winter Olympics in Oslo, Norway.

== Medalists ==
Medal	Name	Sport	Event
Gold	Veikko Hakulinen	Cross-country skiing	Men's 50 km
Gold	Heikki Hasu; Urpo Korhonen; Paavo Lonkila; Tapio Mäkelä	Cross-country skiing	Men's 4 × 10 km relay
Gold	Lydia Wideman	Cross-country skiing	Women's 10 km
Silver	Tapio Mäkelä	Cross-country skiing	Men's 18 km
Silver	Eero Kolehmainen	Cross-country skiing	Men's 50 km
Silver	Mirja Hietamies	Cross-country skiing	Women's 10 km
Silver	Heikki Hasu	Nordic combined	Men's individual
Bronze	Paavo Lonkila	Cross-country skiing	Men's 18 km
Bronze	Siiri Rantanen	Cross-country skiing	Women's 10 km

== Alpine skiing ==
Men

Athlete	Event	Race 1		Race 2		Total	
Athlete	Event	Time	Rank	Time	Rank	Time	Rank
Eino Kalpala	Downhill					3:16.2	56
Pentti Alonen	Downhill					2:59.7	44
Pekka Alonen	Giant Slalom					3:00.2	55
Niilo Juvonen	Giant Slalom					2:52.8	44
Eino Kalpala	Giant Slalom					2:52.3	42
Pentti Alonen	Giant Slalom					2:45.1	31
Nillo Juvonen	Slalom	DNF	–	did not advance			
Pentti Alonen	Slalom	1:12.5	51	did not advance			
Eino Kalpala	Slalom	1:09.2	39	did not advance			
Pekka Alonen	Slalom	1:04.8	24 Q	1:03.9	14	2:08.7	14

== Cross-country skiing ==
Men

Event	Athlete	Race	
Event	Athlete	Time	Rank
18 km	Eeti Nieminen	1'08:24	21
18 km	Aulis Sipponen	1'06:03	16
18 km	Paavo Korhonen	1'05:30	14
18 km	Toivo Oikarinen	1'04:07	10
18 km	Tauno Sipilä	1'03:40	8
18 km	Heikki Hasu	1'02:24	4
18 km	Paavo Lonkila	1'02:20	3rd place, bronze medalist(s)
18 km	Tapio Mäkelä	1'02:09	2nd place, silver medalist(s)
50 km	Peeka Kuvaja	3'46:31	9
50 km	Kalevi Mononen	3'39:21	5
50 km	Eero Kolehmainen	3'38:11	2nd place, silver medalist(s)
50 km	Veikko Hakulinen	3'33:33	1st place, gold medalist(s)

Men's 4 × 10 km relay

Athletes	Race	
Athletes	Time	Rank
Heikki Hasu; Paavo Lonkila; Urpo Korhonen; Tapio Mäkelä	2'20:16	1st place, gold medalist(s)

Women

Event	Athlete	Race	
Event	Athlete	Time	Rank
10 km	Sirkka Polkunen	43:07	5
10 km	Siiri Rantanen	42:50	3rd place, bronze medalist(s)
10 km	Mirja Hietamies	42:39	2nd place, silver medalist(s)
10 km	Lydia Wideman	41:40	1st place, gold medalist(s)

== Figure skating ==
Men

Athlete	CF	FS	Points	Places	Rank
Kalle Tuulos	13	13	131.211	112	13

Women

Athlete	CF	FS	Points	Places	Rank
Leena Pietila	20	21	124.733	185	20

== Ice hockey ==
The tournament was run in a round-robin format with nine teams participating.

Team	Pld	W	L	T	GF	GA	Pts
Canada	8	7	0	1	71	14	15
United States	8	6	1	1	43	21	13
Sweden	9	7	2	0	53	22	14
Czechoslovakia	9	6	3	0	50	23	12
Switzerland	8	4	4	0	40	40	8
Poland	8	2	5	1	21	56	5
Finland 7th	8	2	6	0	21	60	4
West Germany	8	1	6	1	21	53	3
Norway	8	0	8	0	15	46	0

- Sweden 9-2 Finland
- Switzerland 12-0 Finland
- Canada 13-3 Finland
- USA 8-2 Finland
- Norway 2-5 Finland
- Czechoslovakia 11-2 Finland
- Finland 5-1 Germany FR
- Poland 4-2 Finland

Contestants; Yrjö Hakala; Aarne Honkavaara; Erkki Hytönen; Pentti Isotalo; Matti Karumaa; Ossi Kauppi; Keijo Kuusela; Kauko Mäkinen; Pekka Myllylä; Christian Rapp; Esko Rekomaa; Matti Rintakoski; Eero Saari; Eero Salisma; Lauri Silván; Unto Wiitala; Jukka Wuolio

== Nordic combined ==
Events:

- 18 km cross-country skiing
- normal hill ski jumping

The cross-country skiing part of this event was combined with the main medal event, meaning that athletes competing here were skiing for two disciplines at the same time. Details can be found above in this article, in the cross-country skiing section.

The ski jumping (normal hill) event was held separate from the main medal event of ski jumping, results can be found in the table below (athletes were allowed to perform three jumps, the best two jumps were counted and are shown here).

Athlete	Event	Cross-country		Ski Jumping				Total	
Athlete	Event	Points	Rank	Distance 1	Distance 2	Points	Rank	Points	Rank
Eeti Nieminen	Individual	218.181	7	62.5	64.5	206.0	6	424.181	8
Aulis Sipponen	Individual	226.727	4	60.0	61.5	198.5	12	425.227	7
Paavo Korhonen	Individual	228.727	2	61.0	63.5	206.0	6	434.727	4
Heikki Hasu	Individual	240.000	1	63.0	63.0	207.5	5	447.500	2nd place, silver medalist(s)

== Ski jumping ==
Athlete	Event	Jump 1			Jump 2			Total	
Athlete	Event	Distance	Points	Rank	Distance	Points	Rank	Points	Rank
Tauno Luiro	Normal hill	60.5	95.0	30	64.0	104.5	9	199.5	18
Olavi Kuronen	Normal hill	62.5	103.0	14	61.5	101.5	14	204.5	12
Pentti Uotinen	Normal hill	63.0	106.5	11	64.5	106.5	5	213.0	8
Antti Hyvärinen	Normal hill	66.5	111.0	3	61.5	102.5	11	213.5	7

== Speed skating ==
Men

Event	Athlete	Race	
Event	Athlete	Time	Rank
500 m	Lassi Parkkinen	DNF	–
500 m	Kauko Salomaa	45.7	24
500 m	Kalevi Laitinen	45.4	21
500 m	Toivo Salonen	44.2	8
1500 m	Toivo Salonen	2:27.4	25
1500 m	Kalevi Laitinen	2:27.1	24
1500 m	Kauko Salomaa	2:23.3	7
1500 m	Lassi Parkkinen	2:23.0	6
5000 m	Kalevi Laitinen	8:52.4	22
5000 m	Kauko Salomaa	8:40.1	13
5000 m	Matti Tuomi	8:40.0	12
5000 m	Pentti Lammio	8:31.9	7
10,000 m	Matti Tuomi	18:25.5	23
10,000 m	Kauko Salomaa	17:49.6	12
10,000 m	Lassi Parkkinen	17:36.8	8
10,000 m	Pentti Lammio	17:20.5	4
