= Nordic skiing at the 1952 Winter Olympics =

At the 1952 Winter Olympics in Oslo, six Nordic skiing events were contested – four cross-country skiing events, one ski jumping event, and one Nordic combined event. It was also the first time that women were allowed to compete in cross-country skiing at the Olympics.

In men's cross-country skiing Hallgeir Brenden of Norway won the 18 km and Veikko Hakulinen of Finland won the 50 km. In the 4x10 km relay the Finnish team won, which consisted of Tapio Mäkelä, Paavo Lonkila, Heikki Hasu, and Urpo Korhonen. In women's cross-country skiing Lydia Wideman of Finland won the only women's event, which was the 10 km.

In ski jumping, the only winner was Arnfinn Bergmann of Norway for the men's large hill. In Nordic combined, the only winner was Simon Slattvik of Norway for the individual.

Nordic skiing discipline	Men's events	Women's events
Cross-country skiing	• 18 km	• 10 km
Cross-country skiing	• 50 km	• 10 km
Cross-country skiing	• 4 × 10 km relay	• 10 km
Ski jumping	• Large hill (80m)	none
Nordic combined	• Individual	none

== Medal table ==
* Host nation (Norway)

Rank	Nation	Gold	Silver	Bronze	Total
1	Finland	3	4	2	9
2	Norway	3	2	2	7
3	Sweden	0	0	2	2
Totals (3 entries)		6	6	6	18
