= Cross-country skiing at the 1952 Winter Olympics – Men's 4 × 10 kilometre relay =

Men's 4 × 10 kilometre relay at the VI Olympic Winter Games
- Cross-country skiing
- Venue: Holmenkollen
- Date: 23 February 1952
- Competitors: 52 from 13 nations
- Winning time: 2:20:16

Medalists
| 1st place, gold medalist(s) | | Heikki Hasu; Paavo Lonkila; Urpo Korhonen; Tapio Mäkelä | Finland |
| 2nd place, silver medalist(s) | | Magnar Estenstad; Mikal Kirkholt; Martin Stokken; Hallgeir Brenden | Norway |
| 3rd place, bronze medalist(s) | | Nils Täpp; Sigurd Andersson; Enar Josefsson; Martin Lundström | Sweden |

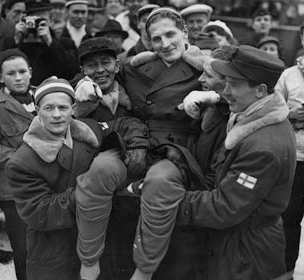
The Finnish 4 × 10 km team with coach Veli Saarinen on top

The men's 4 × 10 kilometre relay cross-country skiing event was part of the cross-country skiing programme at the 1952 Winter Olympics. It was the third appearance of the event. The competition was held on Saturday, 23 February 1952. Fifty-two cross-country skiers from 13 nations competed.

== Medalists ==
| Gold | Silver | Bronze |
|---|---|---|
| Finland; Heikki Hasu; Paavo Lonkila; Urpo Korhonen; Tapio Mäkelä | Norway; Magnar Estenstad; Mikal Kirkholt; Martin Stokken; Hallgeir Brenden | Sweden; Nils Täpp; Sigurd Andersson; Enar Josefsson; Martin Lundström |

== Results ==
| Rank | Team | Athletes | Times | Final |
|---|---|---|---|---|
| Gold | Finland | Heikki Hasu | 35:01 | 2'20:16 |
| Gold | Finland | Paavo Lonkila | 35:22 | 2'20:16 |
| Gold | Finland | Urpo Korhonen | 35:47 | 2'20:16 |
| Gold | Finland | Tapio Mäkelä | 34:06 | 2'20:16 |
| Silver | Norway | Magnar Estenstad | 36:52 | 2'23:13 |
| Silver | Norway | Mikal Kirkholt | 36:07 | 2'23:13 |
| Silver | Norway | Martin Stokken | 35:37 | 2'23:13 |
| Silver | Norway | Hallgeir Brenden | 34:37 | 2'23:13 |
| Bronze | Sweden | Nils Täpp | 36:19 | 2'24:13 |
| Bronze | Sweden | Sigurd Andersson | 36:39 | 2'24:13 |
| Bronze | Sweden | Enar Josefsson | 35:43 | 2'24:13 |
| Bronze | Sweden | Martin Lundström | 35:32 | 2'24:13 |
| 4 | France | Gérard Perrier | 38:53 | 2'31:11 |
| 4 | France | Benoît Carrara | 37:35 | 2'31:11 |
| 4 | France | Jean Mermet | 38:00 | 2'31:11 |
| 4 | France | René Mandrillon | 36:43 | 2'31:11 |
| 5 | Austria | Hans Eder | 38:41 | 2'34:36 |
| 5 | Austria | Friedrich Krischan | 39:50 | 2'34:36 |
| 5 | Austria | Karl Rafreider | 38:16 | 2'34:36 |
| 5 | Austria | Josef Schneeberger | 37:49 | 2'34:36 |
| 6 | Italy | Arrigo Delladio | 38:46 | 2'35:33 |
| 6 | Italy | Nino Anderlini | 38:08 | 2'35:33 |
| 6 | Italy | Federico Deflorian | 40:51 | 2'35:33 |
| 6 | Italy | Vincenzo Perruchon | 37:48 | 2'35:33 |
| 7 | Germany | Hubert Egger | 38:26 | 2'36:37 |
| 7 | Germany | Albert Mohr | 39:56 | 2'36:37 |
| 7 | Germany | Heinz Hauser | 39:23 | 2'36:37 |
| 7 | Germany | Rudi Kopp | 38:52 | 2'36:37 |
| 8 | Czechoslovakia | Vladimír Šimůnek | 38:59 | 2'37:12 |
| 8 | Czechoslovakia | Štefan Kovalčík | 39:50 | 2'37:12 |
| 8 | Czechoslovakia | Vlastimil Melich | 40:24 | 2'37:12 |
| 8 | Czechoslovakia | Jaroslav Cardal | 37:59 | 2'37:12 |
| 9 | Switzerland | Fritz Kocher | 40:55 | 2'38:00 |
| 9 | Switzerland | Walter Lötscher | 39:21 | 2'38:00 |
| 9 | Switzerland | Alfred Kronig | 39:44 | 2'38:00 |
| 9 | Switzerland | Alfons Supersaxo | 38:00 | 2'38:00 |
| 10 | Romania | Moise Crăciun | 40:07 | 2'38:23 |
| 10 | Romania | Manole Aldescu | 39:58 | 2'38:23 |
| 10 | Romania | Dumitru Frăţilă | 40:18 | 2'38:23 |
| 10 | Romania | Constantin Enache | 38:00 | 2'38:23 |
| 11 | Iceland | Gunnar Pétursson | 40:05 | 2'40:09 |
| 11 | Iceland | Ebenezer Thorarinsson | 40:30 | 2'40:09 |
| 11 | Iceland | Jón Kristjánsson | 39:39 | 2'40:09 |
| 11 | Iceland | Ívar Stefánsson | 39:55 | 2'40:09 |
| 12 | United States | George Hovland | 44:01 | 2'53:28 |
| 12 | United States | John C. Burton | 43:23 | 2'53:28 |
| 12 | United States | Theodore A. Farwell | 43:06 | 2'53:28 |
| 12 | United States | Wendell Broomhall | 42:58 | 2'53:28 |
| - | Bulgaria | Ivan Staykov | 40:27 | — |
| - | Bulgaria | Petar Kovachev | 41:16 | — |
| - | Bulgaria | Vasil Gruev | 41:24 | — |
| - | Bulgaria | Boris Stoev | DNF | — |
