= Norway at the 1952 Winter Olympics =

- IOC code: NOR
- NOC: Norwegian Sports Federation

in Oslo
- Competitors: 73 (61 men, 12 women) in 8 sports
- Flag bearer: Hjalmar Andersen (speed skating)
- Medals Ranked 1st: Gold 7 Silver 3 Bronze 6 Total 16

Winter Olympics appearances (overview)
- 1924; 1928; 1932; 1936; 1948; 1952; 1956; 1960; 1964; 1968; 1972; 1976; 1980; 1984; 1988; 1992; 1994; 1998; 2002; 2006; 2010; 2014; 2018; 2022; 2026

Norway was the host nation for the 1952 Winter Olympics in Oslo.

By winning 7 gold medals, Norway had the most golds at these games. This would be the last time a host country would win the most gold medals at the Winter Olympics until Canada won the most gold medals at the 2010 Winter Olympics in Vancouver.

== Medalists ==
Medal	Name	Sport	Event
Gold	Stein Eriksen	Alpine skiing	Men's giant slalom
Gold	Hallgeir Brenden	Cross-country skiing	Men's 18 km
Gold	Simon Slåttvik	Nordic combined	Men's individual
Gold	Arnfinn Bergmann	Ski jumping	Men's normal hill
Gold	Hjalmar Andersen	Speed skating	Men's 1500m
Gold	Hjalmar Andersen	Speed skating	Men's 5000m
Gold	Hjalmar Andersen	Speed skating	Men's 10,000m
Silver	Stein Eriksen	Alpine skiing	Men's slalom
Silver	Magnar Estenstad; Mikal Kirkholt; Martin Stokken; Hallgeir Brenden	Cross-country skiing	Men's 4 × 10 km relay
Silver	Torbjørn Falkanger	Ski jumping	Men's normal hill
Bronze	Guttorm Berge	Alpine skiing	Men's slalom
Bronze	Magnar Estenstad	Cross-country skiing	Men's 50 km
Bronze	Sverre Stenersen	Nordic combined	Men's individual
Bronze	Arne Johansen	Speed skating	Men's 500m
Bronze	Roald Aas	Speed skating	Men's 1500m
Bronze	Sverre Haugli	Speed skating	Men's 5000m

== Alpine skiing ==
Men

Athlete	Event	Race 1		Race 2		Total	
Athlete	Event	Time	Rank	Time	Rank	Time	Rank
Sverre Johannessen	Downhill					DSQ	–
Johnny Lunde	Downhill					2:43.6	20
Gunnar Hjeltnes	Downhill					2:35.9	7
Stein Eriksen	Downhill					2:33.8	6
Alf Opheim	Giant Slalom					2:35.9	19
Guttorm Berge	Giant Slalom					2:34.5	13
Gunnar Hjeltnes	Giant Slalom					2:33.7	10
Stein Eriksen	Giant Slalom					2:25.0	1st place, gold medalist(s)
Gunnar Hjeltnes	Slalom	1:11.6	49	did not advance			
Per Rollum	Slalom	1:01.6	11 Q	1:02.9	9	2:04.5	8
Guttorm Berge	Slalom	1:01.1	6 Q	1:00.6	3	2:01.7	3rd place, bronze medalist(s)
Stein Eriksen	Slalom	59.2	1 Q	1:02.0	6	2:01.2	2nd place, silver medalist(s)

Women

Athlete	Event	Race 1		Race 2		Total	
Athlete	Event	Time	Rank	Time	Rank	Time	Rank
Borghild Niskin	Downhill					DSQ	–
Karen-Sofie Styrmoe	Downhill					2:15.5	31
Dagny Jørgensen	Downhill					1:56.8	21
Margit Hvammen	Downhill					1:50.9	7
Tull Gasmann	Giant Slalom					2:34.3	35
Dagny Jørgensen	Giant Slalom					2:31.1	33
Margit Hvammen	Giant Slalom					2:17.7	18
Borghild Niskin	Giant Slalom					2:11.9	6
Tull Gasmann	Slalom	1:29.4	35	1:07.5	8	2:36.9	33
Karen-Sofie Styrmoe	Slalom	1:15.0	28	1:12.6	27	2:27.6	23
Margit Hvammen	Slalom	1:09.8	14	1:11.4	23	2:21.2	18
Borghild Niskin	Slalom	1:08.7	10	1:09.0	14	2:17.7	11

== Bobsleigh ==
Sled	Athletes	Event	Run 1		Run 2		Run 3		Run 4		Total	
Sled	Athletes	Event	Time	Rank	Time	Rank	Time	Rank	Time	Rank	Time	Rank
NOR-1	Arne Holst; Kåre Christiansen	Two-man	1:24.52	13	1:24.77	11	1:24.24	12	1:24.88	14	5:38.41	13
NOR-2	Erik Tandberg; Curt James Haydn	Two-man	1:26.33	15	1:24.82	12	1:24.23	11	1:24.24	10	5:39.62	14

Sled	Athletes	Event	Run 1		Run 2		Run 3		Run 4		Total	
Sled	Athletes	Event	Time	Rank	Time	Rank	Time	Rank	Time	Rank	Time	Rank
NOR-1	Arne Holst; Trygve Brudevold; Curt James Haydn; Kåre Christiansen	Four-man	1:20.05	12	1:19.93	9	1:19.98	12	1:21.40	12	5:21.36	12
NOR-2	Reidar Alveberg; Anders Hveem; Arne Røgden; Gunnar Thoresen	Four-man	1:21.53	15	1:21.18	13	1:20.77	14	1:20.99	10	5:24.47	13

== Cross-country skiing ==
Men

Event	Athlete	Race	
Event	Athlete	Time	Rank
18 km	Sverre Stenersen	1'09:44	27
18 km	Per Gjelten	1'07:40	20
18 km	Ottar Gjermundshaug	1'06:13	17
18 km	Simon Slåttvik	1'05:40	15
18 km	Mikal Kirkholt	1'04:53	12
18 km	Magnar Estenstad	1'04:26	11
18 km	Martin Stokken	1'03:00	6
18 km	Hallgeir Brenden	1'01:34	1st place, gold medalist(s)
50 km	Harald Maartmann	3'43:43	8
50 km	Edvin Landsem	3'40:43	7
50 km	Olav Økern	3'38:45	4
50 km	Magnar Estenstad	3'38:28	3rd place, bronze medalist(s)

Men's 4 × 10 km relay

Athletes	Race	
Athletes	Time	Rank
Magnar Estenstad; Mikal Kirkholt; Martin Stokken; Hallgeir Brenden	2'23:13	2nd place, silver medalist(s)

Women

Event	Athlete	Race	
Event	Athlete	Time	Rank
10 km	Jorun Askersrud	47:45	12
10 km	Gina Sigstad	45:37	10
10 km	Marit Øiseth	45:04	7
10 km	Rakel Wahl	44:54	6

== Figure skating ==
Women

Athlete	CF	FS	Points	Places	Rank
Bjørg Løhner Øien	23	DNS	DNF	–	–
Ingeborg Nilsson	25	24	113.322	215	24

Pairs

Athletes	Points	Places	Rank
Bjørg Skjærlaaen; Reidar Børjeson	8.346	117	13

== Ice hockey ==
The tournament was run in a round-robin format with nine teams participating.

Team	Pld	W	L	T	GF	GA	Pts
Canada	8	7	0	1	71	14	15
United States	8	6	1	1	43	21	13
Sweden	9	7	2	0	53	22	14
Czechoslovakia	9	6	3	0	50	23	12
Switzerland	8	4	4	0	40	40	8
Poland	8	2	5	1	21	56	5
Finland	8	2	6	0	21	60	4
West Germany	8	1	6	1	21	53	3
Norway 9th	8	0	8	0	15	46	0

- Norway 2-3 USA
- Norway 0-6 Czechoslovakia
- Norway 2-4 Sweden
- Norway 2-7 Switzerland
- Norway 2-5 Finland
- Norway 2-6 Germany FR
- Norway 2-11 Canada
- Norway 3-4 Poland

Contestants; Jan Erik Adolfsen; Arne Berg; Egil Bjerklund; Per Dahl; Bjørn Gulbrandsen; Bjørn Oscar Gulbrandsen; Finn Gundersen; Arthur Kristiansen; Gunnar Kroge; Johnny Larntvet; Roar Pedersen; Annar Petersen; Ragnar Rygel; Leif Solheim; Øivind Solheim; Roy Strandem; Per Voigt

== Nordic combined ==
Events:

- 18 km cross-country skiing
- normal hill ski jumping

The cross-country skiing part of this event was combined with the main medal event, meaning that athletes competing here were skiing for two disciplines at the same time. Details can be found above in this article, in the cross-country skiing section.

The ski jumping (normal hill) event was held separate from the main medal event of ski jumping, results can be found in the table below (athletes were allowed to perform three jumps, the best two jumps were counted and are shown here).

Athlete	Event	Cross-country		Ski Jumping				Total	
Athlete	Event	Points	Rank	Distance 1	Distance 2	Points	Rank	Points	Rank
Sverre Stenersen	Individual	213.335	9	68.0	69.5	223.0	2	436.335	3rd place, bronze medalist(s)
Per Gjelten	Individual	220.848	6	65.0	66.0	212.0	3	432.848	5
Ottar Gjermundshaug	Individual	226.121	5	61.0	64.5	206.0	6	432.121	6
Simon Slåttvik	Individual	228.121	3	67.0	66.5	223.5	1	451.621	1st place, gold medalist(s)

== Ski jumping ==
Athlete	Event	Jump 1			Jump 2			Total	
Athlete	Event	Distance	Points	Rank	Distance	Points	Rank	Points	Rank
Halvor Næs	Normal hill	63.5	108.0	8	64.5	108.5	3	216.5	4
Arne Hoel	Normal hill	66.5	109.0	7	63.5	106.5	5	215.5	6
Arnfinn Bergmann	Normal hill	67.5	112.0	2	68.0	114.0	1	226.0	1st place, gold medalist(s)
Torbjørn Falkanger	Normal hill	68.0	113.0	1	64.0	108.5	3	221.5	2nd place, silver medalist(s)

== Speed skating ==
Men

Event	Athlete	Race	
Event	Athlete	Time	Rank
500 m	Sigmund Søfteland	44.3	10
500 m	Hroar Elvenes	44.1	6
500 m	Finn Helgesen	44.0^{1}	5
500 m	Arne Johansen	44.0	3rd place, bronze medalist(s)
1500 m	Nic Stene	2:24.8	15
1500 m	Ivar Martinsen	2:23.4	8
1500 m	Roald Aas	2:21.6	3rd place, bronze medalist(s)
1500 m	Hjalmar Andersen	2:20.4	1st place, gold medalist(s)
5000 m	Yngvar Karlsen	8:48.2	20
5000 m	Wiggo Hanssen	8:37.2	9
5000 m	Sverre Haugli	8:22.4	3rd place, bronze medalist(s)
5000 m	Hjalmar Andersen	8:10.6 OR	1st place, gold medalist(s)
10,000 m	Ingar Nordlund	DNF	–
10,000 m	Yngvar Karlsen	18:10.6	18
10,000 m	Sverre Haugli	17:30.2	6
10,000 m	Hjalmar Andersen	16:45.8 OR	1st place, gold medalist(s)

^{1} No bronze medal awarded as there was a tie for bronze
