= Nordic combined at the 1952 Winter Olympics =

Nordic Combined at the VI Olympic Winter Games
- Venue: Holmenkollbakken
- Dates: 17–18 February 1952
- Competitors: 25 from 11 nations
- Winning Score: 451.62

Medalists
1st place, gold medalist(s)		Simon Slåttvik	Norway
2nd place, silver medalist(s)		Heikki Hasu	Finland
3rd place, bronze medalist(s)		Sverre Stenersen	Norway

At the 1952 Winter Olympics in Oslo, one Nordic combined event was contested. This marked the first time in Olympic history that the ski jumping portion of the competition was held before the 18 km cross-country skiing segment.

== Medalists ==
Gold	Simon Slåttvik; Norway
Silver	Heikki Hasu; Finland
Bronze	Sverre Stenersen; Norway

== Results ==
Rank	Athlete	Jumping								18 km Cross-Country			Final
Rank	Athlete	Jump	Distance	Style					Rank	Time	Points	Rank	Final
Rank	Athlete	Jump	Distance	A	B	C	D	E	Rank	Time	Points	Rank	Final
Gold	Simon Slåttvik (NOR)	1	67.5m	7.0	7.0	6.5	7.0	9.0	1	1:05:40	228.121	3	451.621
Gold	Simon Slåttvik (NOR)	2	67.0m	17.0	17.0	18.0	18.0	18.5	1	1:05:40	228.121	3	451.621
Gold	Simon Slåttvik (NOR)	3	66.5m	17.0	17.0	18.5	18.0	18.0	1	1:05:40	228.121	3	451.621
Silver	Heikki Hasu (FIN)	1	63.0m	16.5	15.0	17.0	16.0	16.0	5	1:02:24	240.000	1	447.500
Silver	Heikki Hasu (FIN)	2	63.0m	16.5	16.0	16.5	17.0	16.0	5	1:02:24	240.000	1	447.500
Silver	Heikki Hasu (FIN)	3	61.0m	7.0	6.0	7.0	5.0	4.0	5	1:02:24	240.000	1	447.500
Bronze	Sverre Stenersen (NOR)	1	67.0m	17.0	17.5	16.5	17.0	17.5	2	1:09:44	213.335	9	436.335
Bronze	Sverre Stenersen (NOR)	2	68.0m	16.5	17.0	17.5	16.5	17.5	2	1:09:44	213.335	9	436.335
Bronze	Sverre Stenersen (NOR)	3	69.5m	17.0	16.5	17.0	16.5	17.0	2	1:09:44	213.335	9	436.335
4	Paavo Korhonen (FIN)	1	61.0m	6.0	6.0	6.5	5.0	4.0	6	1:05:30	228.727	2	434.727
4	Paavo Korhonen (FIN)	2	61.0m	16.0	15.5	17.0	16.5	16.0	6	1:05:30	228.727	2	434.727
4	Paavo Korhonen (FIN)	3	63.5m	16.5	15.5	17.0	16.5	16.0	6	1:05:30	228.727	2	434.727
5	Per Gjelten (NOR)	1	65.0m	16.0	16.0	16.0	16.5	16.5	3	1:07:40	220.848	6	432.848
5	Per Gjelten (NOR)	2	64.5m	15.0	15.0	16.5	15.0	16.0	3	1:07:40	220.848	6	432.848
5	Per Gjelten (NOR)	3	66.0m	16.5	16.0	16.0	16.0	17.0	3	1:07:40	220.848	6	432.848
6	Ottar Gjermundshaug (NOR)	1	61.0m	15.5	16.0	15.5	15.0	16.0	6	1:06:13	226.121	5	432.121
6	Ottar Gjermundshaug (NOR)	2	64.5m	16.5	16.5	17.5	16.5	16.5	6	1:06:13	226.121	5	432.121
6	Ottar Gjermundshaug (NOR)	3	68.0m	6.0	6.5	7.5	5.0	5.0	6	1:06:13	226.121	5	432.121
7	Aulis Sipponen (FIN)	1	59.0m	15.5	15.5	16.0	16.0	15.0	12	1:06:03	226.727	4	425.227
7	Aulis Sipponen (FIN)	2	60.0m	16.0	15.0	16.5	16.0	15.0	12	1:06:03	226.727	4	425.227
7	Aulis Sipponen (FIN)	3	61.5m	16.0	15.0	16.5	14.0	15.0	12	1:06:03	226.727	4	425.227
8	Eeti Nieminen (FIN)	1	59.0m	16.0	16.5	16.0	17.0	16.5	6	1:08:24	218.181	7	424.181
8	Eeti Nieminen (FIN)	2	62.5m	16.0	15.5	17.5	16.0	15.0	6	1:08:24	218.181	7	424.181
8	Eeti Nieminen (FIN)	3	64.5m	16.0	15.5	16.5	16.5	16.0	6	1:08:24	218.181	7	424.181
9	Hans Eder (AUT)	1	61.5m	16.5	14.0	14.0	13.5	14.0	4	1:10:13	211.575	11	420.575
9	Hans Eder (AUT)	2	62.0m	16.5	16.5	16.0	17.0	16.5	4	1:10:13	211.575	11	420.575
9	Hans Eder (AUT)	3	64.5m	17.0	15.5	16.0	17.0	16.0	4	1:10:13	211.575	11	420.575
10	Alfons Supersaxo (SUI)	1	61.0m	15.5	14.5	15.5	15.0	15.5	9	1:09:38	213.696	8	415.196
10	Alfons Supersaxo (SUI)	2	60.5m	16.0	15.5	16.0	15.5	15.5	9	1:09:38	213.696	8	415.196
10	Alfons Supersaxo (SUI)	3	62.5m	16.0	15.0	16.0	16.0	15.5	9	1:09:38	213.696	8	415.196
11	Theodore A. Farwell (USA)	1	60.0m	15.5	16.0	16.5	15.0	15.5	13	1:11:54	205.454	13	401.454
11	Theodore A. Farwell (USA)	2	59.5m	14.0	14.0	15.0	13.5	14.0	13	1:11:54	205.454	13	401.454
11	Theodore A. Farwell (USA)	3	60.0m	14.5	15.0	15.5	15.0	15.0	13	1:11:54	205.454	13	401.454
12	Alfredo Prucker (ITA)	1	58.5m	14.0	14.0	14.5	14.5	14.5	17	1:10:56	208.970	12	397.970
12	Alfredo Prucker (ITA)	2	59.5m	15.0	14.0	15.0	14.5	14.5	17	1:10:56	208.970	12	397.970
12	Alfredo Prucker (ITA)	3	60.5m	13.5	13.0	13.0	11.0	12.0	17	1:10:56	208.970	12	397.970
13	Erik Elmsäter (SWE)	1	61.0m	16.5	16.0	15.0	15.5	15.0	11	1:13:46	198.667	16	397.667
13	Erik Elmsäter (SWE)	2	59.5m	5.0	5.5	5.5	4.0	4.0	11	1:13:46	198.667	16	397.667
13	Erik Elmsäter (SWE)	3	62.0m	15.5	15.0	16.0	15.0	15.0	11	1:13:46	198.667	16	397.667
14	Ryoichi Fujisawa (JPN)	1	61.5m	15.0	15.5	15.0	14.5	15.5	10	1:14:41	195.333	18	396.333
14	Ryoichi Fujisawa (JPN)	2	59.5m	15.0	15.0	14.5	15.5	14.5	10	1:14:41	195.333	18	396.333
14	Ryoichi Fujisawa (JPN)	3	63.0m	15.5	15.5	15.0	16.0	16.0	10	1:14:41	195.333	18	396.333
15	Heinz Hauser (GER)	1	60.0m	14.5	14.5	14.0	14.0	15.0	14	1:13:30	199.636	15	393.136
15	Heinz Hauser (GER)	2	59.0m	14.0	13.5	14.5	14.0	15.0	14	1:13:30	199.636	15	393.136
15	Heinz Hauser (GER)	3	62.0m	14.5	14.5	15.0	15.0	15.0	14	1:13:30	199.636	15	393.136
16	Vlastimil Melich (TCH)	1	58.0m	4.0	4.0	3.0	3.0	4.0	23	1:10:09	211.818	10	390.818
16	Vlastimil Melich (TCH)	2	56.0m	13.0	13.5	14.0	13.0	13.5	23	1:10:09	211.818	10	390.818
16	Vlastimil Melich (TCH)	3	58.0m	13.5	13.5	15.0	13.5	14.0	23	1:10:09	211.818	10	390.818
17	Lars-Erik Efverström (SWE)	1	59.5m	15.0	14.5	16.0	14.5	14.0	15	1:14:19	196.667	17	389.667
17	Lars-Erik Efverström (SWE)	2	59.0m	13.5	14.5	16.0	14.5	14.0	15	1:14:19	196.667	17	389.667
17	Lars-Erik Efverström (SWE)	3	60.5m	16.0	14.5	15.0	14.0	15.5	15	1:14:19	196.667	17	389.667
18	Leopold Kohl (AUT)	1	58.0m	14.0	13.5	14.5	14.0	14.0	20	1:13:10	200.848	14	383.348
18	Leopold Kohl (AUT)	2	57.0m	15.0	13.0	12.0	13.5	13.0	20	1:13:10	200.848	14	383.348
18	Leopold Kohl (AUT)	3	58.0m	14.0	13.0	14.5	13.5	13.0	20	1:13:10	200.848	14	383.348
19	Niculae-Cornel Crăciun (ROU)	1	57.5m	15.0	14.0	14.0	14.0	14.5	16	1:17:11	186.121	20	376.621
19	Niculae-Cornel Crăciun (ROU)	2	56.5m	15.0	15.5	15.0	15.5	15.5	16	1:17:11	186.121	20	376.621
19	Niculae-Cornel Crăciun (ROU)	3	59.5m	15.0	14.5	15.0	14.5	16.0	16	1:17:11	186.121	20	376.621
20	Sepp Schiffner (AUT)	1	56.5m	13.5	12.0	12.0	13.0	13.0	19	1:17:31	185.030	21	371.530
20	Sepp Schiffner (AUT)	2	59.5m	14.0	13.5	12.0	14.0	13.5	19	1:17:31	185.030	21	371.530
20	Sepp Schiffner (AUT)	3	60.5m	12.5	13.5	14.5	14.0	14.0	19	1:17:31	185.030	21	371.530
21	Thomas M. Jacobs (USA)	1	57.0m	14.0	13.5	14.0	14.0	13.5	21	1:16:43	187.939	19	367.439
21	Thomas M. Jacobs (USA)	2	56.5m	2.0	3.0	4.5	1.5	2.0	21	1:16:43	187.939	19	367.439
21	Thomas M. Jacobs (USA)	3	56.0m	14.0	13.0	14.0	13.0	14.0	21	1:16:43	187.939	19	367.439
22	John H. Caldwell (USA)	1	57.5m	4.0	4.0	3.5	2.0	2.0	25	1:25:42	155.273	22	301.773
22	John H. Caldwell (USA)	2	57.5m	3.0	3.5	3.0	1.0	2.0	25	1:25:42	155.273	22	301.773
22	John H. Caldwell (USA)	3	58.0m	13.0	13.0	12.0	12.5	12.0	25	1:25:42	155.273	22	301.773
-	Alvin P. Wegeman (USA)	1	58.5m	14.0	14.0	14.5	14.5	14.5	18	DNF	-		-
-	Alvin P. Wegeman (USA)	2	58.5m	14.5	14.0	14.5	14.5	14.5	18	DNF	-		-
-	Alvin P. Wegeman (USA)	3	59.5m	4.0	3.0	3.0	3.0	3.0	18	DNF	-		-
-	Helmut Böck (GER)	1	57.5m	3.0	3.5	4.5	2.0	3.0	22	DNF	-		-
-	Helmut Böck (GER)	2	54.5m	13.0	13.5	14.0	12.0	13.0	22	DNF	-		-
-	Helmut Böck (GER)	3	58.5m	13.5	14.0	15.0	14.0	14.5	22	DNF	-		-
-	Peter Radacher (AUT)	1	57.0m	14.0	13.5	13.0	13.0	14.5	24	DNF	-		-
-	Peter Radacher (AUT)	2	56.5m	4.0	3.0	3.5	1.0	2.0	24	DNF	-		-
-	Peter Radacher (AUT)	3	58.0m	4.0	4.0	2.5	2.0	4.0	24	DNF	-		-

== Participating NOCs ==
Eleven nations participated in Nordic combined at the Oslo Games. Romania made their first, and as of 2010, only appearance in the sport.

- Austria (4)
- Czechoslovakia (1)
- Finland (4)
- Germany (2)
- Italy (1)
- Japan (1)
- Norway (4)
- Romania (1)
- Sweden (2)
- Switzerland (1)
- United States (4)
