= Anders Törnkvist =

Swedish cross-country skier

Personal information
- Full name: Anders Lennart Törnkvist
- Born: 4 March 1920 Mora, Sweden
- Died: 21 January 1986 (aged 65) Mora, Sweden

Sport
- Sport: Skiing
- Club: IFK Mora
Medal record
Men's cross-country skiing
Representing Sweden
Swedish Championship
Gold medal – first place	1945	3 × 10 km relay
Gold medal – first place	1950	3 × 10 km relay
Gold medal – first place	1952	50 km
Silver medal – second place	1945	50 km
Silver medal – second place	1947	30 km
Silver medal – second place	1947	50 km
Silver medal – second place	1950	50 km
Vasaloppet
Silver medal – second place	1947
Silver medal – second place	1948
Silver medal – second place	1949
Silver medal – second place	1954
Bronze medal – third place	1944
Bronze medal – third place	1945
Bronze medal – third place	1951
Holmenkollen Ski Festival
Gold medal – first place	1950	50 km

Anders Lennart Törnkvist (4 March 1920 – 21 January 1986) was a Swedish cross-country skier who competed in the late 1940s and early 1950s. He finished fourth in the 50 km event at the 1950 FIS Nordic World Ski Championships in Lake Placid, New York.

Törnkvist competed in two Winter Olympic Games in the 50 km event, finishing fifth in 1948 and tenth in 1952.

== Cross-country skiing results ==
All results are sourced from the International Ski Federation (FIS).

=== Olympic Games ===
Year	Age	18 km	50 km	4 × 10 km relay
1948	27	—	5	—
1952	31	—	10	—

=== World Championships ===
Year	Age	18 km	50 km	4 × 10 km relay
1950	29	—	4	—
