= Arthur Herrdin =

Swedish cross-country skier

Arthur Herrdin (26 November 1918 in Lillhärdal, Härjedalen – 20 July 1995) was a Swedish cross-country skier who competed in the 1940s and in the 1950s.

In 1948, he competed in the 50 km competition but did not finish the race.

Four years later he finished 13th in the 50 km event at the 1952 Winter Olympics in Oslo.

== Cross-country skiing results ==
=== Olympic Games ===
Year	Age	18 km	50 km	4 × 10 km relay
1948	29	—	DNF	—
1952	33	—	13	—
