= Simon Slåttvik =

Norwegian Nordic combined skier (1917–2001)

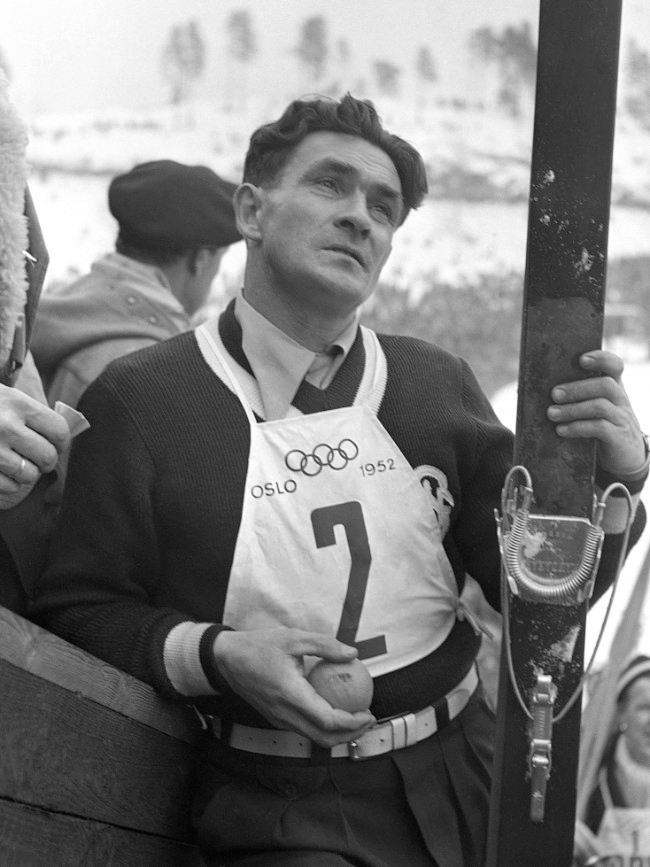
- Slåttvik at the Holmenkollen in 1952

Personal information
- Born: 24 July 1917 Valnesfjord, Norway
- Died: 7 May 2001 (aged 83) Lillehammer, Norway

Sport
- Sport: Nordic combined
- Club: IL Stålkameratene
Medal record
Men's Nordic combined
Representing Norway
Olympic Games
Gold medal – first place	1952 Oslo	Individual
World Championships
Bronze medal – third place	1950 Lake Placid	Individual

Simon Kaurin Slåttvik (24 July 1917 – 7 May 2001) was a Norwegian skier. He competed at the 1952 Winter Olympics in the Nordic combined and 18 km cross-country skiing and won the gold medal in the former event. Earlier he won a Nordic combined bronze medal at the 1950 World Championships. He won 14 Norwegian titles and was the first Nordic combined athlete to jump over 100 m. Slåttvik won the Nordic combined event at the Holmenkollen ski festival in 1948, 1950 and 1951, and was awarded the Holmenkollen medal in 1951.

Slåttvik started competing in Nordic events aged 15. His career was delayed by World War II and peaked around 1950, when he was already in his thirties. After the 1952 Olympics he won a national title in 1953, placed fifth at the 1954 World Championships, and remained active through the late 1950s. Slåttvik was known for his relatively mild training regime, and would often smoke after a race. In the early 1950s he moved to Lillehammer, married and had two sons. He named one of them Heikki after his Finnish friend and long-term rival Heikki Hasu.

== Cross-country skiing results ==
=== Olympic Games ===
Year	Age	18 km	50 km	4 × 10 km relay
1952	34	15	—	—

=== World Championships ===
Year	Age	15 km	30 km	50 km	4 × 10 km relay
1954	36	59	—	—	—
