= Kalevi Mononen =

Finnish cross-country skier

Kalevi Mononen (25 March 1920 – 18 September 1996) was a Finnish cross-country skier who competed in the 1950s. He was born in Savonranta. He finished fifth in the 50 km event at the 1952 Winter Olympics in Oslo.

== Cross-country skiing results ==
All results are sourced from the International Ski Federation (FIS).

=== Olympic Games ===
Year	Age	18 km	50 km	4 × 10 km relay
1952	31	—	5	—
