= Australia at the 1952 Winter Olympics =

- IOC code: AUS
- NOC: Australian Olympic Committee
- Website: www.olympics.com.au

in Oslo
- Competitors: 9 in 4 sports
- Medals: Gold 0 Silver 0 Bronze 0 Total 0

Winter Olympics appearances (overview)
- 1936; 1948; 1952; 1956; 1960; 1964; 1968; 1972; 1976; 1980; 1984; 1988; 1992; 1994; 1998; 2002; 2006; 2010; 2014; 2018; 2022; 2026

Australia sent a delegation to compete at the 1952 Winter Olympics from 14 to 25 February 1952 in Oslo, Norway. This was the nation's second appearance at the Winter Olympic Games with their first being in 1936.

The Australian delegation consisted of nine competitors in four sports. This included the nation's debut in alpine skiing, cross-country skiing, and figure skating, and their second appearance in speed skating. Australia's best result from the 1952 Games was a tenth-place finish in men's singles figure skating. Nancy Hallam and Gweneth Molony became Australia's first women athletes at the Winter Olympics as they competed in the ladies' singles figure skating; they finished 14th and 21st respectively.

== Background ==
The Australian Olympic Committee was formed on 1 January 1895 with the nation making their debut at the first Olympics in Athens; Teddy Flack was the first representative of the country. 1952 was Australia's second appearance at a Winter Olympics and the first since 1936. It was also the 13th overall Olympics that Australia had sent a delegation in. The 1952 Winter Olympics was held at Oslo in Norway and took place from 14 to 25 February; a total of 694 athletes competed from 30 nations. The Australian delegation consisted of nine athletes, three in figure skating and alpine skiing, two in cross-country skiing and one in speed skating.

== Alpine skiing ==
Australia entered three skiers in the alpine skiing events, with Bob Arnott and Barry Patten competing in their only Olympics, and Bill Day competing in his first of three Olympics. The first event for the trio was the men's giant slalom which was making its debut at the Games. Bill Day finished the best of the Australians as he placed 67th, forty-five seconds behind gold medalist Stein Eriksen from Norway. Arnott and Patten finished 78th and 80th out of the eighty-two that finished the course. The following day, the three Australians competed in the men's downhill, which was held at the same venue as the giant slalom. Bill Day was the leading Australian out of the three entries as he finished 60th, a full minute off the pace from Zeno Colò from Italy who won the gold medal. Patten placed 67th while Arnott ranked 71st out of the 72 that finished.

The final event was the men's slalom which took place on 19 February. None of the three Australian competitors qualified for the second round, with Day once again being the best performing of the Aussies, finishing 54th. Arnott finished 65th and Patten 76th.

Athlete	Event	Run 1		Run 2		Final/Total		
Athlete	Event	Time	Rank	Time	Rank	Time	Diff	Rank
Bob Arnott	Men's downhill	—N/a				4:13.5	+1:42.7	71
Bob Arnott	Men's giant slalom	—N/a				3:38.4	+1:13.4	78
Bob Arnott	Men's slalom	1:21.1	65	did not advance				
Bill Day	Men's downhill	—N/a				3:31.4	+1:00.6	60
Bill Day	Men's giant slalom	—N/a				3:10.5	+45.5	67
Bill Day	Men's slalom	1:13.9	54	did not advance				
Barry Patten	Men's downhill	—N/a				3:53.1	+1:22.3	67
Barry Patten	Men's giant slalom	—N/a				3:41.5	+1:16.5	80
Barry Patten	Men's slalom	1:29.6	76	did not advance				

== Cross-country skiing ==
Australia entered two athletes in cross-country skiing at the 1952 Olympics with Bruce Haslingden and Cedric Sloane being selected for the nation in what was their only appearance at an Olympics. Paying for their own expenses relating to the Games, Haslingden and Sloane competed in two events.

The first event for the duo was the men's 18 kilometres which was held on 18 February. After being held under excellent snow conditions, Haslingden would finish one place higher than Sloane as they placed in 74th and 75th respectively; Hallgeir Brenden from Norway took the gold medal in the event. Two days later, the duo competed in the men's 50 kilometres, where they would not finish the event; they retired after falling 12 kilometres behind the leaders. Veikko Hakulinen from Finland claimed the gold medal with a time of 3 hours and 33 minutes.

Athlete	Event	Race	
Athlete	Event	Time	Rank
Bruce Haslingden	Men's 18 km	1:29:58	74
Bruce Haslingden	Men's 50 km	did not finish	
Cedric Sloane	Men's 18 km	1:32:39	75
Cedric Sloane	Men's 50 km	did not finish	

== Figure skating ==
Australia entered three figure skaters in the 1952 Games with Adrian Swan, Nancy Burley and Gweneth Molony representing the nation. In the men's singles, Swan, for whom 1952 would be his only Olympics, was initially refused to be entered by the Victorian Skating Association, but was later allowed by the International Skating Union. After completing the compulsory figures in 12th place, he would go on to finish in 10th place with a score of 1,248.2, while Dick Button from the United States won the gold medal.

In the ladies' singles, Burley and Molony, who both only competed in the 1952 Games, were selected on 14 October 1951 as part of the announcement that included the skiing reveal as well. Heading into the Olympics, Molony was the two-time defending national ladies' singles champion who had won at the Glaciarium. At the event, held 16–17 February (compulsory figures) and 20 February (free skating), Burley would go on to finish the higher of the two Australian athletes, placing 14th with 1220.7 points. Molony would finish seven spots behind, in 21st, with 1119.1 points. The gold medal was won by Jeannette Altwegg from Great Britain.

Athlete(s)	Event	CF	FS	TO	Points	Rank
Adrian Swan	Men's	12	9	95	1248.2	10
Nancy Burley	Ladies'	17	14	111	1220.7	14
Gweneth Molony	Ladies'	18	22	141	1119.1	21

== Speed skating ==
In the first of three Olympic appearances, Colin Hickey was the only speed-skater to compete for Australia at the 1952 Games. He competed in three speed skating events with those being the 500m, 1500m and the 5000m. His first event of the games was the men's 500 metres which took place on the 16 February. From a field of 42 competitors, Hickey finished 29th with a time of 46.2 seconds, three seconds behind the gold medallist in Ken Henry from the United States. The following day, he competed in the men's 1500 metres where he came in 30th position out of 39 with a time of 2:30.4, ten seconds behind the gold medallist in Hjalmar Andersen from Norway. His final event of the Olympics was the men's 5000 metres where he finished 28th out of 35 skaters with a time of eight minutes and 57 seconds. He was forty seconds behind Anderson who claimed the gold.

Athlete	Event	Final	
Athlete	Event	Time	Rank
Colin Hickey	Men's 500 m	46.2	29
Colin Hickey	Men's 1500 m	2:30.4	30
Colin Hickey	Men's 5000 m	8:57.6	28

== See also ==
- Australia at the Winter Olympics
