= Kauko =

Kauko is a given name. Notable people with the name include:

- Kauko Armas Nieminen (1929–2010), Finnish self-taught physicist
- Kauko Hänninen (1930–2013), Finnish Olympic rower
- Kauko Helovirta (1924–1997), Finnish film actor
- Kauko Jalkanen (1918–2007), Finnish Olympic fencer
- Kauko Käyhkö (1916–1983), Finnish musician and entertainer
- Kauko Mäkinen (1927–1968), Finnish ice hockey player
- Kauko Nieminen (born 1979), Finnish Speedway racer
- Kauko Pirinen (1915–1999), Finnish historian, professor in church history at Helsinki University
- Kauko Röyhkä, (born 1959), Finnish rock musician and author
- Kauko Salomaa (1928–2016), Finnish former speed skater
- Kauko Wahlsten (1923–2001), Finnish rower

== See also ==
- Joni Kauko (born 1990), Finnish professional footballer
