= Tauno Sipilä =

Finnish cross-country skier

Tauno Olavi Sipilä (7 November 1921, Multia, Central Finland - 9 July 2001) was a Finnish cross-country skier who competed in the 1950s. At the 1954 FIS Nordic World Ski Championships in Falun, he finished fifth in the 30 km event.

Sipilä also finished eighth in the 18 km event at the 1952 Winter Olympics in Oslo.

== Cross-country skiing results ==
All results are sourced from the International Ski Federation (FIS).

=== Olympic Games ===
Year	Age	18 km	50 km	4 × 10 km relay
1952	30	8	—	—

=== World Championships ===
Year	Age	15 km	30 km	50 km	4 × 10 km relay
1954	32	—	5	—	—
