= Lars-Erik Efverström =

Swedish Nordic combined skier

Lars-Erik Efverström (February 26, 1925, Hållnäs, Uppland – January 26, 2003) was a Swedish Nordic skier who competed in the 1940s and 1950s. At the 1952 Winter Olympics, Efverström finished 17th in the Nordic combined event and 58th in the 18 km cross-country skiing event.

== Cross-country skiing results ==
=== Olympic Games ===
Year	Age	18 km	50 km	4 × 10 km relay
1952	26	58	—	—
