= Toivo Oikarinen =

Finnish cross-country skier

Toivo Oikarinen (16 April 1924 – 4 May 2003) was a Finnish cross-country skier who competed in the 1950s. He finished tenth in the 18 km event at the 1952 Winter Olympics in Oslo. He was born in Sonkajärvi.

== Cross-country skiing results ==
=== Olympic Games ===
Year	Age	18 km	50 km	4 × 10 km relay
1952	27	10	—	—
