= Sigurd Andersson =

Swedish cross-country skier

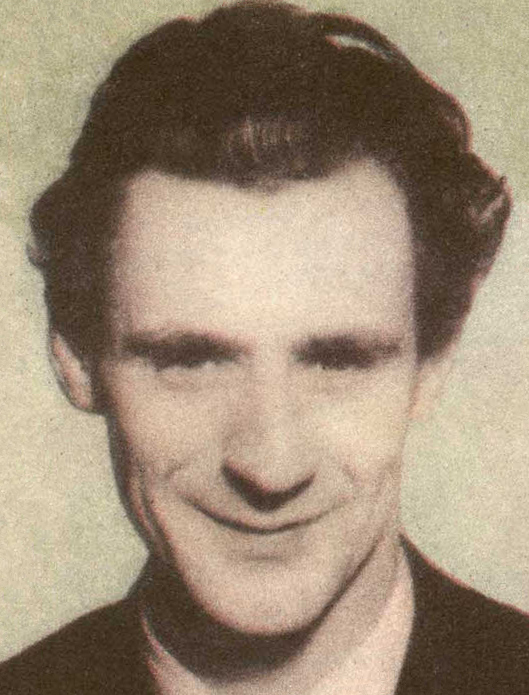

Personal information
- Born: 18 July 1926 Börjelsbyn, Kalix, Sweden
- Died: 5 February 2009 (aged 82) Kalix, Sweden

Sport
- Sport: Cross-country skiing
- Club: IFK Kalix
Medal record
Men's cross-country skiing
Representing Sweden
Olympic Games
Bronze medal – third place	1952 Oslo	4 × 10 km relay

Karl Sigurd Andersson (18 July 1926 – 5 February 2009) was a Swedish cross-country skier who won a bronze medal in the 4 × 10 km relay at the 1952 Winter Olympics in Oslo.

Andersson was lumberjack by profession. He won his first skiing medal in 1946, at the junior district championships. In 1950 he finished third in the 15 km race at the national senior championships and was included into the national team. He won his only national title in 1952, in the relay.

== Cross-country skiing results ==
=== Olympic Games ===
- 1 medal – (1 bronze)

Year	Age	18 km	50 km	4 × 10 km relay
1952	25	—	—	Bronze
