= Gindre =

Gindre is a surname. Notable people with the surname include:

- Gervais Gindre (1927–1990), French cross-country skier
- Juan Gindre (1915–1990), Argentine sports shooter
- Nick Gindre (born 1984), Argentine footballer
- Robert Gindre (1911–1991), French cross-country skier

== See also ==
- Ginder
