= Bulgaria at the 1952 Winter Olympics =

- IOC code: BUL
- NOC: Bulgarian Olympic Committee
- Website: www.bgolympic.org (in Bulgarian and English)

in Oslo
- Competitors: 10 in 2 sports
- Medals: Gold 0 Silver 0 Bronze 0 Total 0

Winter Olympics appearances (overview)
- 1936; 1948; 1952; 1956; 1960; 1964; 1968; 1972; 1976; 1980; 1984; 1988; 1992; 1994; 1998; 2002; 2006; 2010; 2014; 2018; 2022; 2026

Bulgaria competed at the 1952 Winter Olympics in Oslo, Norway.

== Alpine skiing ==
Men

Athlete	Event	Race 1		Race 2		Total	
Athlete	Event	Time	Rank	Time	Rank	Time	Rank
Georgi Mitrov	Downhill					3:44.5	64
Dimitar Drazhev	Downhill					2:55.6	39
Georgi Dimitrov	Downhill					2:49.9	30
Dimitar Drazhev	Giant Slalom					3:17.6	72
Georgi Mitrov	Giant Slalom					3:07.4	65
Georgi Dimitrov	Giant Slalom					2:59.5	53
Georgi Mitrov	Slalom	1:22.8	69	did not advance			
Dimitri Atanasov	Slalom	1:18.7	60	did not advance			
Dimitar Drazhev	Slalom	1:10.1	45	did not advance			
Georgi Dimitrov	Slalom	1:07.0	32 Q	DSQ	–	DSQ	–

== Cross-country skiing ==
Men

Event	Athlete	Race	
Event	Athlete	Time	Rank
18 km	Petar Kovachev	1'14:35	60
18 km	Ivan Staykov	1'12:47	50
18 km	Vasil Gruev	1'12:43	49
18 km	Boris Stoev	1'11:46	42
50 km	Khristo Donchev	4'30:35	25

Men's 4 × 10 km relay

Athletes	Race	
Athletes	Time	Rank
Ivan Staykov; Petar Kovachev; Vasil Gruev; Boris Stoev	DNF	–
