= Aulis Sipponen =

Finnish Nordic combined skier (1929–2021)

Personal information
- Born: 17 January 1929
- Died: 5 March 2021 (aged 92) Orivesi

Sport
- Sport: Cross-country skiing

Aulis Sipponen (17 January 1929 – 5 March 2021) was a Finnish Nordic skier who competed during the 1950s. At the 1952 Winter Olympics in Oslo, he finished seventh in the Nordic combined event and 16th in the 18 km cross-country skiing event. He was born in Valkjärvi and died in Orivesi.

== Cross-country skiing results ==
=== Olympic Games ===
Year	Age	18 km	50 km	4 × 10 km relay
1952	23	16	—	—
