= Olteanu =

Olteanu is a surname. Notable people with the surname include:

- Adriana Nechita-Olteanu (born 1983), Romanian handball player
- Bogdan Olteanu (born 1971), Romanian politician and lawyer, president of the Romanian Chamber of Deputies (2006–2008)
- Gavril Olteanu, a leader of a Romanian paramilitary militia group, part of the Maniu guards during World War II
- George Olteanu (born 1974), former boxer from Romania
- Gheorghe Olteanu (born 1926), Romanian cross country skier
- Ioana Olteanu (born 1966), Romanian rower who won three Olympic medals
- Marcel Olteanu (1872–1943), Romanian general in World War I
- Mihai Olteanu, Romanian football player
- Olteanu, a village in Glogova Commune, Gorj County, Romania

== See also ==
- Olteanu River, a tributary of the Beliş River in Romania
- Oltean
