= Per Gjelten =

Norwegian Nordic combined skier

Per Gjelten (December 5, 1927 – January 25, 1991) was a Norwegian Nordic skier who competed in the early 1950s. He finished fourth in the Nordic combined event at the 1954 FIS Nordic World Ski Championships in Falun and fifth in the same event at the 1952 Winter Olympics in Oslo.

Also in Oslo, he finished 20th in the 18 km cross-country skiing event.

== Cross-country skiing results ==
All results are sourced from the International Ski Federation (FIS).

=== Olympic Games ===
Year	Age	18 km	50 km	4 × 10 km relay
1952	24	20	—	—

=== World Championships ===
Year	Age	15 km	30 km	50 km	4 × 10 km relay
1954	26	48	—	—	—
