= Jacques Perrier =

Jacques Perrier is the name of:

- Jacques Perrier (basketball) (born 1924), French basketball player
- Jacques Perrier (skier) (born 1929), French cross country skier
