= Eeti Nieminen =

Finnish Nordic combined skier

Eeti "Edvard" Olavi Nieminen (29 March 1927 – 13 April 2016) was a Finnish Nordic skier who competed during the 1950s.

He was born in Kivennapa, a territory of Finland at that time.

He finished eighth in the Nordic combined event and 21st in the 18 km cross-country skiing event at the 1952 Winter Olympics in Oslo.

Nieminen also finished sixth in the Nordic combined event at the 1954 FIS Nordic World Ski Championships in Falun.

== Cross-country skiing results ==
=== Olympic Games ===
Year	Age	18 km	50 km	4 × 10 km relay
1952	24	21	—	—
