= Ginder =

Ginder is a surname. Notable people with the surname include:

- David Kirk Ginder (1983–2021), known by the pseudonyms Near and Byuu, American programmer
- Grant Ginder (born 1982/1983), American writer
- Philip De Witt Ginder (1905–1968), United States Army general

== See also ==
- Gindre
- Rinder
