= Ottar Gjermundshaug =

Norwegian Nordic combined skier

Medal record

Men's Nordic combined

Representing Norway

World Championships
Silver medal – second place	1950 Lake Placid	Individual

Ottar Gjermundshaug (29 January 1925, Alvdal – 10 April 1963) was a Norwegian Nordic combined skier who competed in the early 1950s. He won a silver medal in the individual event at the 1950 FIS Nordic World Ski Championships in Lake Placid, New York.

Gjermundshaug also finished sixth in the individual event and 18th in the 18 km cross-country skiing event at the 1952 Winter Olympics in Oslo.

He represented Alvdal IL.

== Cross-country skiing results ==
=== Olympic Games ===
Year	Age	18 km	50 km	4 × 10 km relay
1952	27	17	—	—

=== World Championships ===
Year	Age	18 km	50 km	4 × 10 km relay
1950	25	—	DNF	—
