= Karl-Erik Åström =

Swedish cross-country skier (1924–1993)

Medal record

Men's cross-country skiing

Representing Sweden

World Championships
| Gold medal – first place | 1950 Lake Placid | 18 km |
| Gold medal – first place | 1950 Lake Placid | 4 x 10 km |

Karl-Erik Åström (18 April 1924 - 9 December 1993) was a Swedish cross-country skier who competed in the 1950s. He won two gold medals at the 1950 FIS Nordic World Ski Championships in the 18 km and the 4 x 10 km.

== Career ==
Karl-Erik Åström made his only appearance in the international stage during the 1950 Nordic World Ski Championship which was held in Rumford, Maine. After being a reserve for the Swedish team in the 1948 Winter Olympics held in St. Moritz, he was selected in the same spot in 1950 but was then granted a spot in the men's cross country which was held on 3 February where he claimed the gold medal ahead of fellow Swedish competitor Enar Josefsson who was the favourite leading into the race. Two days later, he would be part of the Swedish team that won the 4x10km relay with Nils Täpp, Martin Lundström and Enar Josefsson.

== Cross-country skiing results ==
All results are sourced from the International Ski Federation (FIS).

=== World Championships ===
- 2 medals – (2 gold)

| Year | Age | 18 km | 50 km | 4 × 10 km relay |
|---|---|---|---|---|
| 1950 | 26 | Gold | — | Gold |
