= Berecz =

Berecz is a surname. Notable people with the surname include:

- Anna Berecz (born 1988), Hungarian alpine skiers
- Ignácz Berecz (1912–1997), Hungarian cross country skier
- Ilona Berecz (born 1947), Hungarian ice dancing coach and former competitor
- Sherry Berecz, American politician
- Zsombor Berecz (sailor) (born 1986), Hungarian sailor
- Zsombor Berecz (footballer) (born 1995), Hungarian footballer
