= Viljo Vellonen =

Finnish cross-country skier

Medal record

Men's cross-country skiing

Representing Finland

World Championships
Silver medal – second place	1950 Lake Placid	4 × 10 km relay

Viljo Vellonen (March 24, 1920 – February 5, 1995) was a Finnish cross-country skier. He won a silver medal in the 4 × 10 km relay at the 1950 FIS Nordic World Ski Championships in Lake Placid, New York.

Vellonen also finished sixth in the 18 km event at those same championships.

== Cross-country skiing results ==
All results are sourced from the International Ski Federation (FIS).

=== World Championships ===
- 1 medal – (1 silver)

Year	Age	18 km	50 km	4 × 10 km relay
1950	29	6	—	Silver
