= Septmoncel Les Molunes =

- Commune
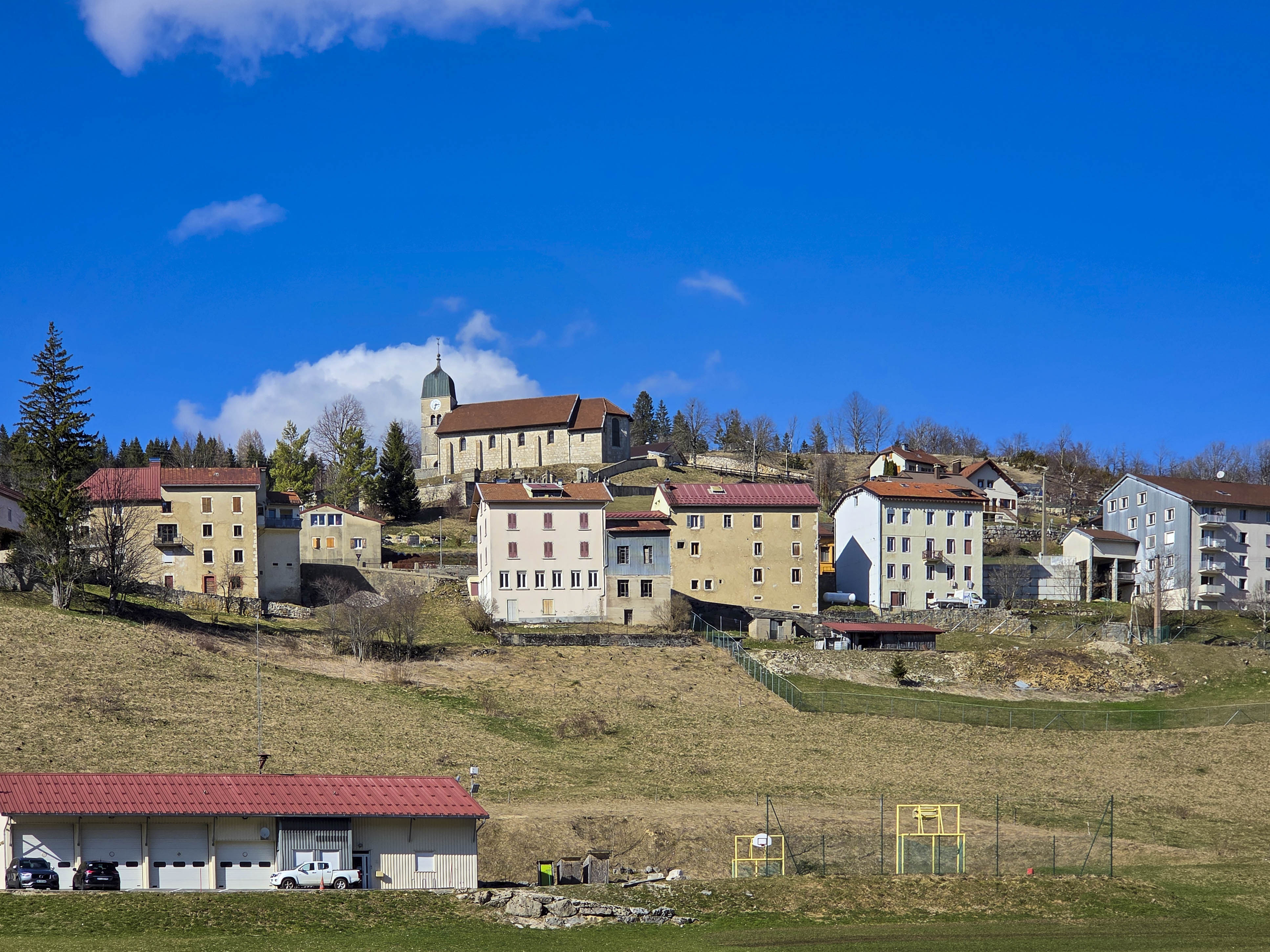
- The village of Septmoncel
- Location of Septmoncel Les Molunes
- Location within France Location within Bourgogne-Franche-Comté
- Coordinates: 46°22′19″N 5°54′50″E
- Country: France
- Region: Bourgogne-Franche-Comté
- Department: Jura
- Arrondissement: Saint-Claude
- Canton: Coteaux du Lizon
- Area^{1}: 39.91 km^{2} (15.41 sq mi)
- Population (2023): 812
  - Density: 20.3/km^{2} (52.7/sq mi)
- Time zone: UTC+01:00 (CET)
  - Summer (DST): UTC+02:00 (CEST)
- INSEE/Postal code: 39510 /39310
- ^{1} French Land Register data, which excludes lakes, ponds, glaciers > 1 km^{2} (0.386 sq mi or 247 acres) and river estuaries.

Septmoncel Les Molunes (French pronunciation: [sɛmɔ̃sɛl le mɔlyn]) is a commune in the department of Jura, eastern France. The municipality was established on 1 January 2017 by merger of the former communes of Septmoncel (the seat) and Les Molunes.

== See also ==
- Communes of the Jura department
