= Urpo Korhonen =

Finnish cross-country skier

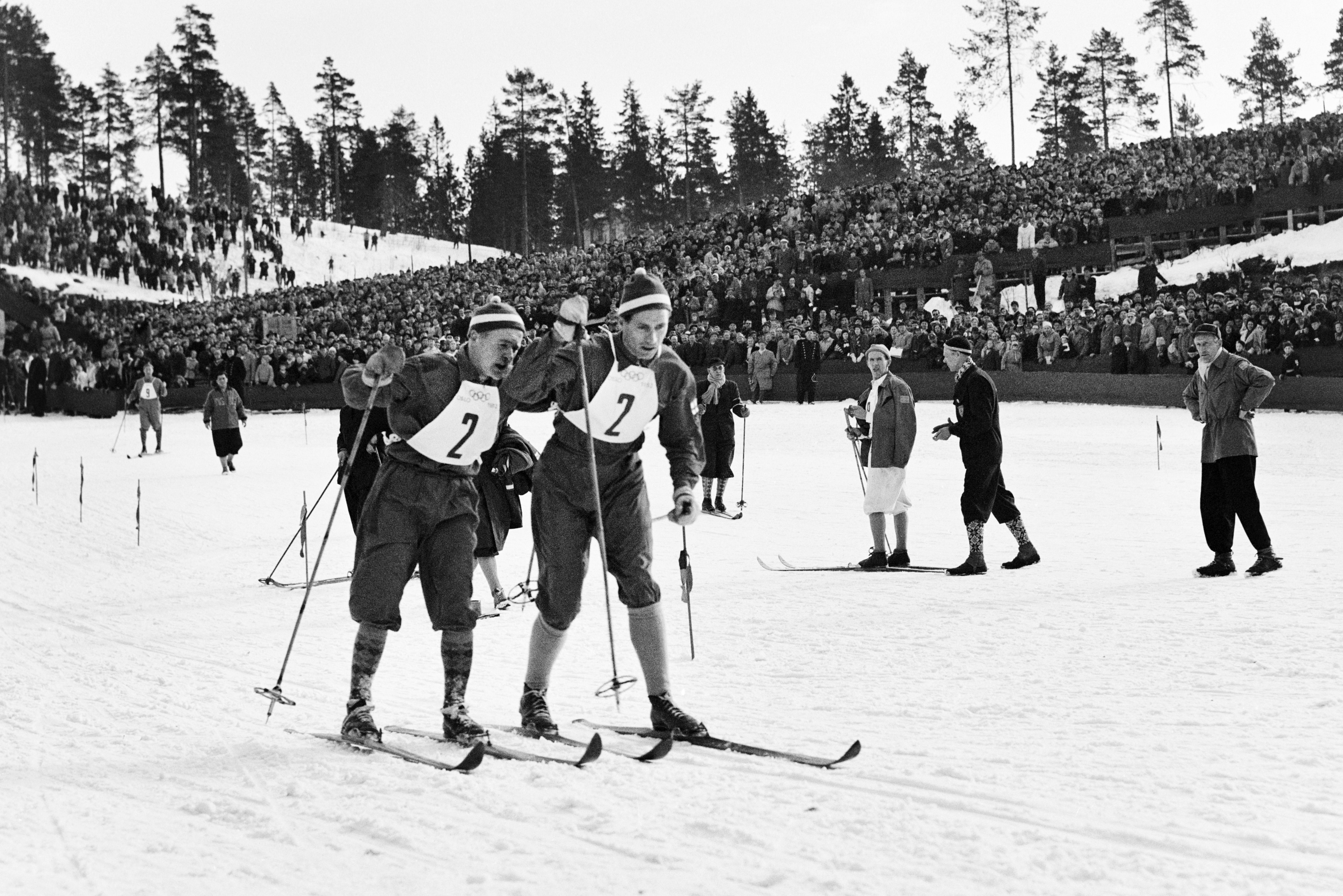
- Korhonen (right) at the 1952 Olympics.

Medal record

Men's cross-country skiing

Representing Finland

Olympic Games
Gold medal – first place	1952 Oslo	4 × 10 km relay

Urpo Pentti Korhonen (8 February 1923, Rautalampi – 10 August 2009) was a Finnish cross-country skier who competed in the 1940s and 1950s.

He was born in Rautalampi.

He won a gold medal at the 1952 Winter Olympics in Oslo in the 4 × 10 km relay.

== Cross-country skiing results ==
=== Olympic Games ===
Year	Age	18 km	50 km	4 × 10 km relay
1952	29	14	—	Gold
