= Kristian Bjørn =

Norwegian cross-country skier (1919–1993)

Medal record

Men's cross-country skiing

Representing Norway

World Championships
Bronze medal – third place	1950 Lake Placid	4 × 10 km relay

Kristian Bjørn (22 August 1919, in Alvdal Municipality – 1 April 1993) was a Norwegian cross-country skier who competed in the 1940s and 1950s.

He finished ninth in the 50 km race at the 1948 Winter Olympics. He won a bronze medal in the 4 × 10 km relay at the 1950 FIS Nordic World Ski Championships.

He represented Alvdal IL. He is the father of Torgeir Bjørn.

== Cross-country skiing results ==
=== Olympic Games ===
Year	Age	18 km	50 km	4 × 10 km relay
1948	28	—	9	—

=== World Championships ===
- 1 medal – (1 bronze)

Year	Age	18 km	50 km	4 × 10 km relay
1950	30	18	—	Bronze
