= Bruce Haslingden =

Australian cross-country skier (1923–2007)

Edward Bruce Haslingden (March 1923 – 17 April 2007) was an Australian cross-country skier who competed in the 1950s. He finished 74th in the 18 km event at the 1952 Winter Olympics in Oslo. Haslingden also competed in the 50 km event at those same games, but did not finish. Together with Cedric Sloane, as part of Australia's first Winter Olympics team, they were the first Australians to compete at the Winter Olympics in the sport of cross-country skiing.

Haslingden's place at the Olympics was secured by 'qualifying' in a selection trial at Perisher Valley. Haslingden was a grazier in the Cooma region of New South Wales who trained for the event on his farm. He later retired to Merimbula, New South Wales.

Haslingden died on 17 April 2007 from a staphylococcus infection acquired on his farm.

== See also ==
- Cross-country skiing at the 1952 Winter Olympics – Men's 18 km
- Cross-country skiing at the 1952 Winter Olympics – Men's 50 km
