= Enar Josefsson =

Swedish cross-country skier

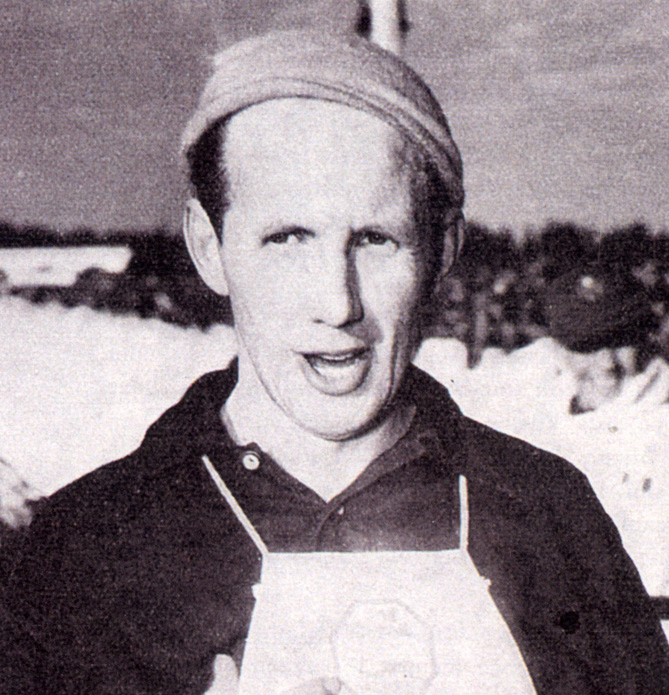
- Josefsson in the 1950s

Personal information
- Full name: Gustaf Enar Josefsson
- Nickname: Âseleexpressen
- Born: 6 September 1916 Åsele, Sweden
- Died: 18 December 1989 (aged 73) Stockholm, Sweden

Sport
- Sport: Cross-country skiing
- Club: Åsele NS (1945–49); Skellefteå SK (1950–54); Östersund SK (1955–57)
Medal record
Men's cross-country skiing
Representing Sweden
Event	1st	2nd	3rd
Olympic Games	0	0	1
World Championships	1	2	0
Total	1	2	1
Olympic Games
Bronze medal – third place	1952 Oslo	4 × 10 km relay
World Championships
Gold medal – first place	1950 Lake Placid	4 × 10 km relay
Silver medal – second place	1950 Lake Placid	18 km
Silver medal – second place	1950 Lake Placid	50 km

Gustaf Enar "Âseleexpressen" Josefsson (6 September 1916 – 18 December 1989) was a Swedish cross-country skier who won a bronze medal in the 4 × 10 km relay at the 1952 Winter Olympics in Oslo. He won three more medals at the 1950 FIS Nordic World Ski Championships with a gold in the 4 × 10 km relay and silvers in the 18 km and 50 km events.

Josefsson was born in a family of seven siblings, and started working as a forester in his teens to support the family. During his career he won 87 races and was second in 48. He won only one individual national title, in 1952 in the 30 km.

== Cross-country skiing results ==
All results are sourced from the International Ski Federation (FIS).

=== Olympic Games ===
- 1 medal – (1 bronze)

Year	Age	18 km	50 km	4 × 10 km relay
1952	25	13	—	Bronze

=== World Championships ===
- 3 medals – (1 gold, 2 silver)

Year	Age	18 km	50 km	4 × 10 km relay
1950	23	Silver	Silver	Gold
