= Magnar Estenstad =

Norwegian cross-country skier

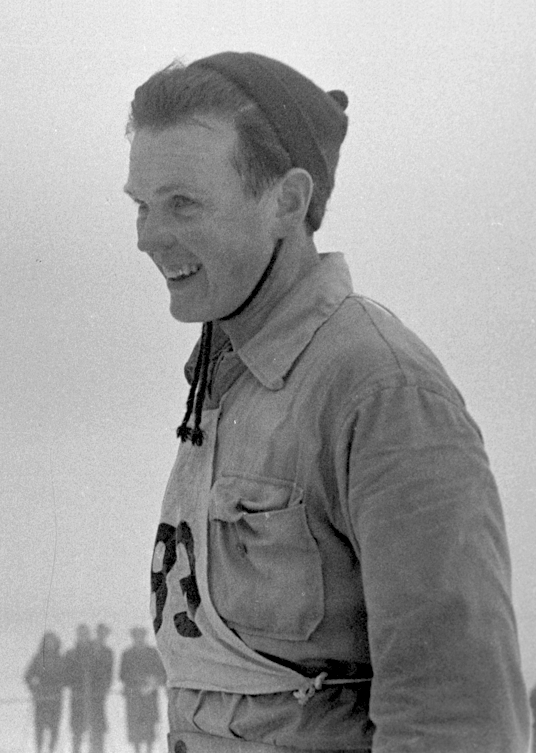
- Estenstad in 1949

Personal information
- Born: 27 September 1924 Hølonda Municipality, Norway
- Died: 13 May 2004 (aged 79) Meldal Municipality, Norway

Sport
- Sport: Cross-country skiing
- Club: IL Leik, Hølonda
Medal record
Men's cross-country skiing
Representing Norway
Olympic Games
Silver medal – second place	1952 Oslo	4 × 10 km relay
Bronze medal – third place	1952 Oslo	50 km

Magnar Estenstad (27 September 1924 – 13 May 2004) was a Norwegian cross-country skier. In 1952 he won the 50 km event at the Holmenkollen ski festival and a silver medal in the 4 × 10 km relay and a bronze in the 50 km at the Oslo Olympics. Next year he was awarded the Holmenkollen medal. Domestically he won the 50 km Norwegian title in 1948–1949 and 1952–1954. In 1950 he won the national 30 km title and placed seventh over 50 km at the world championships. In 1954, after winning the 50 km national title he was about to win the 30 km race, but fell and broke his thigh bone one kilometer away from the finish. He was hospitalized for five months and had to retire from skiing. He worked as a farmer for the rest of his life.

== Cross-country skiing results ==
All results are sourced from the International Ski Federation (FIS).

=== Olympic Games ===
- 2 medals – (1 silver, 1 bronze)

Year	Age	18 km	50 km	4 × 10 km relay
1952	27	11	Bronze	Silver

=== World Championships ===
Year	Age	18 km	50 km	4 × 10 km relay
1950	25	16	7	—
