= Thure Lindgren =

Swedish ski jumper (1921–2005)

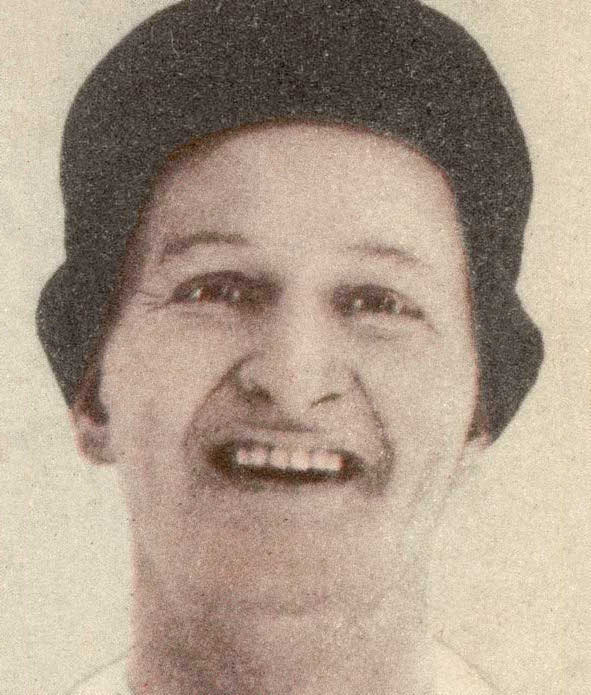
- Lindgren in 1950

Personal information
- Born: 18 April 1921 Jukkasjärvi, Sweden
- Died: 2 September 2005 (aged 84) Jukkasjärvi, Sweden

Sport
- Sport: Ski jumping
- Club: IFK Kiruna
Medal record
Representing Sweden
World Championships
Silver medal – second place	1950 Lake Placid	Large hill

Thure Valdemar Lindgren (18 April 1921 – 2 September 2005) was a Swedish ski jumper who won an individual silver medal in the large hill at the 1950 World Championships. He finished 40th in the normal hill at the 1952 Winter Olympics.
