= Oltean =

Oltean is a Romanian-language surname. Notable people with the surname include:

- Daniela Oltean, Romanian speed skater
- Mircea Oltean, Romanian footballer
- Ioan Oltean, Romanian lawyer and politician
- Sergiu Oltean, Romanian footballer

== See also ==
- Olteanu
