= Arnljot Nyaas =

Norwegian cross-country skier

Medal record

Men's cross-country skiing

Representing Norway

World Championships
Bronze medal – third place	1950 Lake Placid	18 km

Arnljot Nyaas (14 May 1916 – 16 July 1995) was a Norwegian cross-country skier who competed in the early 1950s. He won a bronze medal in the 18 km event at the 1950 FIS Nordic World Ski Championships in Lake Placid, New York.

== Cross-country skiing results ==
All results are sourced from the International Ski Federation (FIS).

=== World Championships ===
- 1 medal – (1 bronze)

Year	Age	18 km	50 km	4 × 10 km relay
1950	33	Bronze	14	—
