= Paavo Lonkila =

Finnish cross-country skier

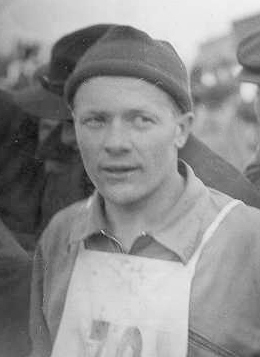

Personal information
- Born: 11 January 1923 Kiuruvesi, Finland
- Died: 22 September 2017 (aged 94) Kiuruvesi, Finland
- Height: 157 cm (5 ft 2 in)
- Weight: 53–54 kg (117–119 lb)

Sport
- Sport: Cross-country skiing
- Club: Kiuruveden Jänne, Kiuruvesi
Medal record
Men's cross-country skiing
Representing Finland
Olympic Games
Gold medal – first place	1952 Oslo	4 × 10 km relay
Bronze medal – third place	1952 Oslo	18 km
World Championships
Silver medal – second place	1950 Lake Placid	4 × 10 km relay

Paavo Olavi Lonkila (born Lång on 11 January 1923 – 22 September 2017) was a Finnish cross-country skier. He won a gold medal in the 4 × 10 km relay at the 1952 Olympics and finished third in the individual 18 km race, 11 seconds behind his teammate Tapio Mäkelä. Earlier his 4 × 10 km relay team placed second at the 1950 FIS Nordic World Ski Championships, where he finished fifth over 18 km. He won the 18 km event at the 1951 Holmenkollen ski festival. Lonkila was a farmer by occupation.

== Cross-country skiing results ==
All results are sourced from the International Ski Federation (FIS).

=== Olympic Games ===
- 2 medals – (1 gold, 1 bronze)

Year	Age	18 km	50 km	4 × 10 km relay
1952	29	Bronze	—	Gold

=== World Championships ===
- 1 medal – (1 silver)

Year	Age	18 km	50 km	4 × 10 km relay
1950	27	5	—	Silver
