= Mikal Kirkholt =

Norwegian cross-country skier

Medal record

Men's cross-country skiing

Representing Norway

Olympic Games
Silver medal – second place	1952 Oslo	4 × 10 km relay

Mikal Kirkholt (9 December 1920 – 28 June 2012) was a Norwegian cross-country skier.

He represented the club SK Troll. At the 1952 Winter Olympics in Oslo he finished twelfth in the 18 kilometres and won a silver medal in the 4 × 10 km relay. He retired after the Olympics, to marry and work in Sunndal Municipality, but later returned to live and work at the family farm in Rindal Municipality.

== Cross-country skiing results ==
=== Olympic Games ===
- 1 medal – (1 silver)

Year	Age	18 km	50 km	4 × 10 km relay
1952	27	12	—	Silver
