= Hans Bjørnstad =

Norwegian ski jumper

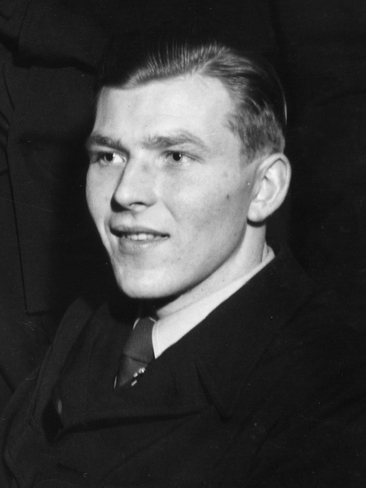
- Bjørnstad at the 1950 World Championships

Personal information
- Born: 18 March 1928 Lier, Norway
- Died: 24 May 2007 (aged 79)
Medal record
Men's ski jumping
Representing Norway
World Championships
Gold medal – first place	1950 Lake Placid	Individual large hill

Hans Bjørnstad (18 March 1928 – 24 May 2007) was a Norwegian ski jumper who competed in the late 1940s and early 1950s. He won the ski jumping gold medal at the 1950 FIS Nordic World Ski Championships in Lake Placid, New York.
