= Vincenzo Perruchon =

Italian cross-country skier

Vincenzo "Cento" Perruchon (8 January 1921 – 29 June 2005) was an Italian cross-country skier who competed in the 1940s and in the early 1950s. He was born in Cogne.

In 1948 he was a member of the Italian relay team which finished sixth in the 4x10 km relay competition. In the 18 km event he finished 54th. Four years later he was again part of the Italian relay team which finished sixth in the 4x10 km relay competition.

Further notable results

- 1946: 2nd, Italian men's championships of cross-country skiing, 18 km classic
- 1947: 1st, Italian men's championships of cross-country skiing, 18 km classic
- 1949: 2nd, Italian men's championships of cross-country skiing, 18 km classic
- 1950: 2nd, Italian men's championships of cross-country skiing, 18 km classic
- 1951: 2nd, Italian men's championships of cross-country skiing, 18 km classic
- 1954: 1st, Italian men's championships of cross-country skiing, 15 km classic
