= Rinder =

Rinder is a German language occupational surname, which means "cattle farmer", from the German word Rind, meaning a cow. The name may refer to:

- Alexandra Rinder (born 1998), German bodyboarder
- Frederick Rinder (1858–1938), British sports administrator
- Friedl Rinder (1905–2001), German chess player
- Lawrence Rinder (born 1961), American curator
- Mike Rinder (1955–2025), Australian Ex-Scientologist
- Robert Rinder (born 1978), British lawyer and television personality
- Walter Rinder (born 1934), American writer
