= Matti Tuomi =

Finnish speed skater

Personal information
- Nationality: Finnish
- Born: 18 August 1925; Hämeenlinna, Finland
- Died: 30 June 2013 (aged 87); Hämeenlinna, Finland

Sport
- Sport: Speed skating

Matti Tuomi (18 August 1925 – 30 June 2013) was a Finnish speed skater. He competed in two events at the 1952 Winter Olympics.
