= Kåre Christiansen =

Norwegian bobsledder (1911–1984)

Kåre Christiansen (April 10, 1911 – October 31, 1984) was a Norwegian bobsledder who competed in the early 1950s. At the 1952 Winter Olympics in Oslo, he finished 12th in the four-man and 13th in the two-man events.
