= Alois Harrer =

German cross-country skier (1926–2009)

Alois Harrer (15 September 1926 – 23 September 2009) was a West German cross-country skier who competed in the 1950s. He finished 59th in the 18 km individual event at the 1952 Winter Olympics in Oslo. He was a policeman by profession.
