= Eino Kalpala =

Finnish alpine skier (1926–2022)

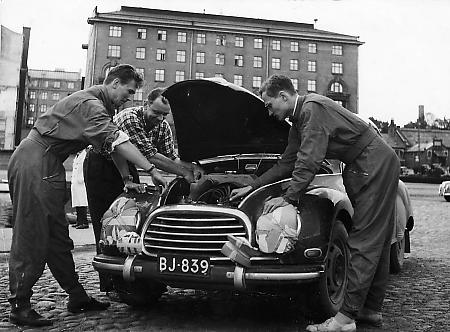
Kalpala (middle) at Jyväskylän Suurajot in 1956

Eino Kalpala (5 August 1926 – 12 August 2022) was a Finnish alpine skier who competed in the 1952 Winter Olympics. Kalpala has also been a world champion veteran alpine skier and a founding member of Finnish Alpine Masters (FAM) organisation in Finland. Eino Kalpala also participated in the Rally of a Thousand Lakes with his brother Osmo Kalpala and together they won several Finnish Rally Championships in Jyväskylä. He turned 90 in August 2016. Kalpala died in Espoo on 12 August 2022, at the age of 96.

Kalpala founded Finland's first ski resort, Kalpalinna, in 1963. He started skiing at the age of 11 and continued to do so until he was over 90. In 2016 he turned 90 and received the Gold Badge of Ski Sport Finland.

Eino Kalpala was also a successful businessman and owned several companies including Radiotukku Oy which imported Blaupunkt radios and TVs to Finland among other brands. He also had a company importing sporting goods to Finland.

Eino Kalpala had three children: Jarmo Kalpala, Jyrki Kalpala and Tuija Kalpala.
