= Antenore Cuel =

Italian cross-country skier (1922–2018)

Personal information
- Born: 27 March 1922
- Died: 21 February 2018 (aged 95)

Sport
- Sport: Skiing

Antenore Cuel (27 March 1922 – 21 February 2018) was an Italian cross-country skier who competed in the 1950s.

== Biography ==
He participated in the demonstration event, military patrol (precursor to biathlon), in the 1948 Winter Olympics, when he had the military rank Alpino. Competing at the 1952 Winter Olympics in Oslo, he finished 19th in the 50 km event. Also in 1952 he placed first at the Italian masterships of cross-country skiing in the 50 km (and long distances) category. Cuel died in February 2018 at the age of 95.
