= Les Molunes =

Commune in Jura, France

- Part of Septmoncel Les Molunes
- Location of Les Molunes
- Location within France Location within Bourgogne-Franche-Comté
- Coordinates: 46°20′45″N 5°55′27″E
- Country: France
- Region: Bourgogne-Franche-Comté
- Department: Jura
- Arrondissement: Saint-Claude
- Canton: Saint-Lupicin
- Commune: Septmoncel Les Molunes
- Area^{1}: 20.51 km^{2} (7.92 sq mi)
- Highest elevation: 1,330 m (4,360 ft)
- Lowest elevation: 750 m (2,460 ft)
- Population (2019): 131
  - Density: 6.39/km^{2} (16.5/sq mi)
- Time zone: UTC+01:00 (CET)
  - Summer (DST): UTC+02:00 (CEST)
- Postal code: 39310
- ^{1} French Land Register data, which excludes lakes, ponds, glaciers > 1 km^{2} (0.386 sq mi or 247 acres) and river estuaries.

Les Molunes (French pronunciation: [le mɔlyn]) is a former commune in the Jura department in Bourgogne-Franche-Comté in eastern France. On 1 January 2017, it was merged into the new commune Septmoncel Les Molunes.

== See also ==
- Communes of the Jura department
