= Septmoncel =

Commune in Jura, France

- Part of Septmoncel Les Molunes
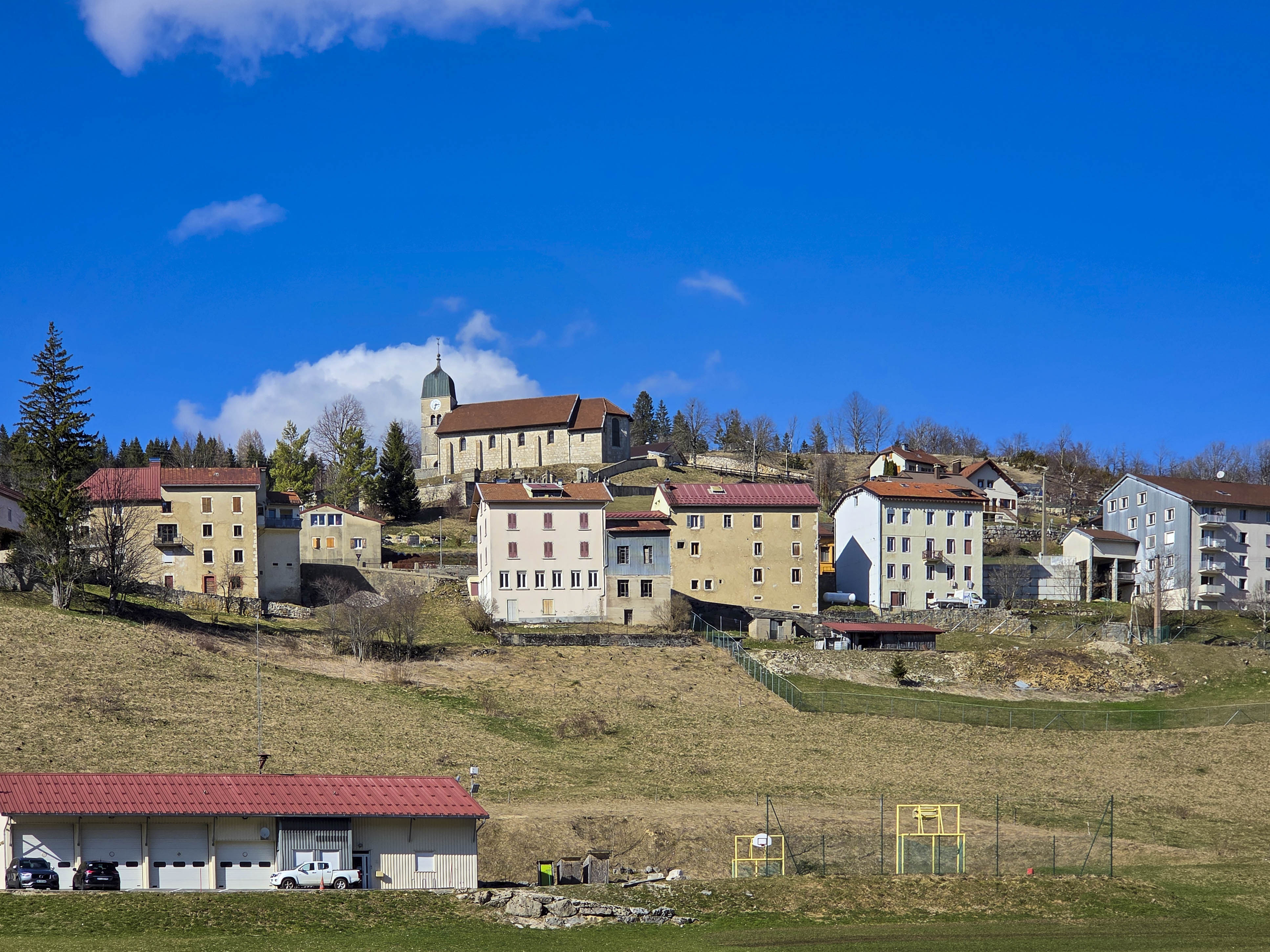
- The village of Septmoncel
- Location of Septmoncel
- Location within France Location within Bourgogne-Franche-Comté
- Coordinates: 46°22′18″N 5°54′50″E
- Country: France
- Region: Bourgogne-Franche-Comté
- Department: Jura
- Arrondissement: Saint-Claude
- Canton: Saint-Lupicin
- Commune: Septmoncel Les Molunes
- Area^{1}: 19.40 km^{2} (7.49 sq mi)
- Highest elevation: 1,281 m (4,203 ft)
- Lowest elevation: 448 m (1,470 ft)
- Population (2019): 669
  - Density: 34.5/km^{2} (89.3/sq mi)
- Time zone: UTC+01:00 (CET)
  - Summer (DST): UTC+02:00 (CEST)
- Postal code: 39310
- ^{1} French Land Register data, which excludes lakes, ponds, glaciers > 1 km^{2} (0.386 sq mi or 247 acres) and river estuaries.

Septmoncel (French pronunciation: [sɛmɔ̃sɛl]) is a former commune in the Jura department in the Bourgogne-Franche-Comté region in eastern France. On 1 January 2017, it was merged into the new commune Septmoncel Les Molunes.

== Population ==
Historical population

Year	Pop.	±% p.a.
1841	1,302	—
1846	1,362	+0.91%
1851	1,345	−0.25%
1856	1,352	+0.10%
1861	1,319	−0.49%
1866	1,300	−0.29%
1872	1,320	+0.25%
1876	1,310	−0.19%
1881	1,319	+0.14%
1886	1,372	+0.79%
1891	1,452	+1.14%
1896	1,456	+0.06%
1901	1,414	−0.58%
1906	1,444	+0.42%
1911	1,346	−1.40%

Year	Pop.	±% p.a.
1921	1,248	−0.75%
1926	1,210	−0.62%
1931	1,065	−2.52%
1936	869	−3.99%
1946	801	−0.81%
1954	767	−0.54%
1962	739	−0.46%
1968	726	−0.30%
1975	655	−1.46%
1982	606	−1.10%
1990	606	+0.00%
1999	658	+0.92%
2006	649	−0.20%
2019	669	+0.23%

Source: EHESS and INSEE

== See also ==
- Communes of the Jura department
