= Juku Pent =

Estonian cross country skier (1918–1991)

Juku Pent (20 November 1918 – 16 October 1991) was an Estonian-born cross-country skier who competed for West Germany in the 1950s. He finished 26th in the 50 km event at the 1952 Winter Olympics in Oslo.

Pent was born in Jäneda, Lääne-Viru County, Estonia.
