= Giacomo Mosele =

Italian cross country skier (born 1925)

Giacomo Mosele (born 30 July 1925) is an Italian cross-country skier who competed in the 1950s. He finished 34th in the 18 km event at the 1952 Winter Olympics in Oslo. He turned 100 on 30 July, 2025.

Further notable results:

- 1952: 2nd, Italian men's championships of cross-country skiing, 18 km
- 1954: 2nd, Italian men's championships of cross-country skiing, 50 km
