= Pekka Myllylä =

Finnish ice hockey player (born 1932)

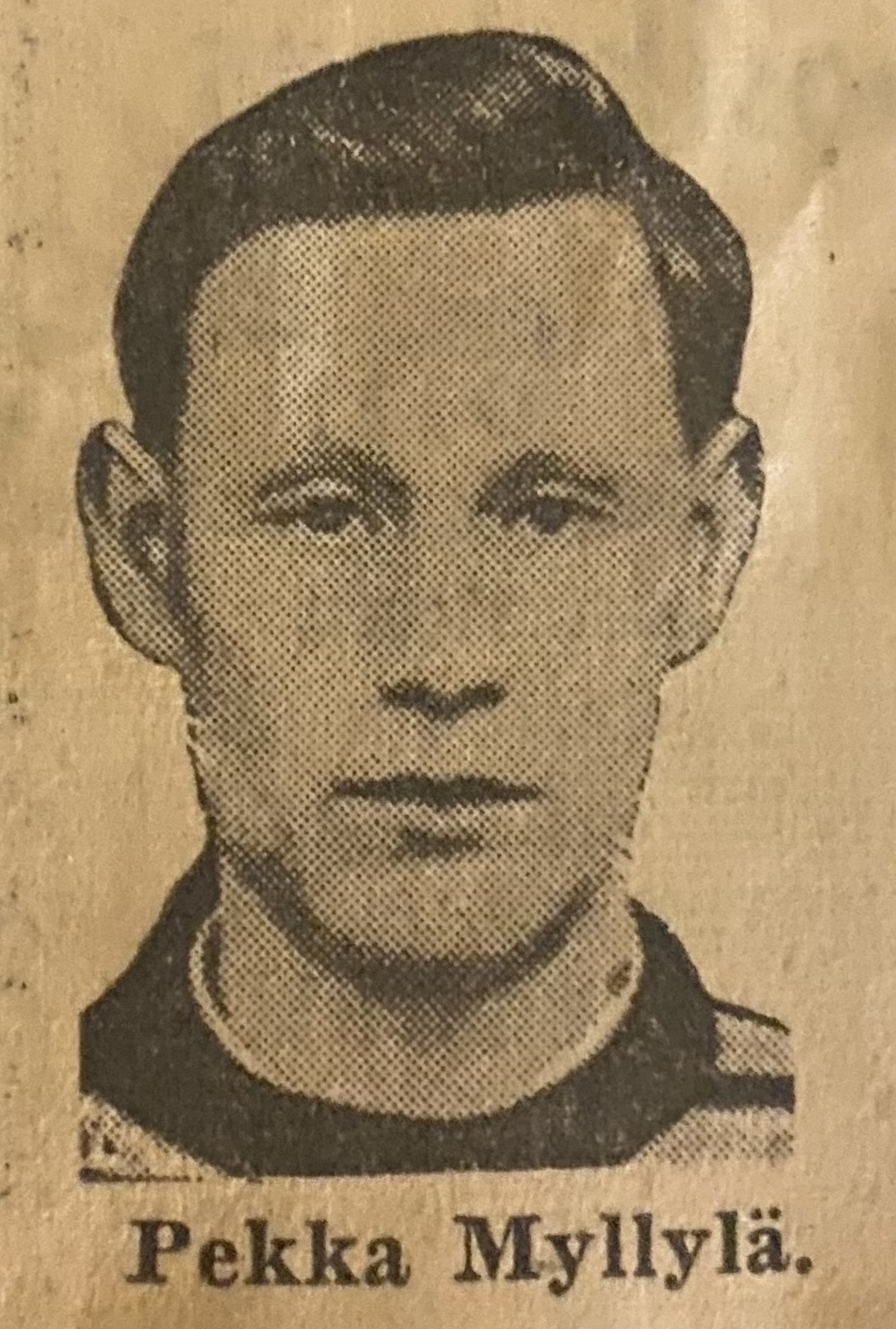

Personal information
- Full name: Pekka Aleksander Myllylä
- Nationality: Finnish
- Born: 7 July 1932 Tampere, Finland

Sport
- Sport: Ice hockey

Pekka Aleksander Myllylä (born 7 July 1932) is a Finnish ice hockey goalkeeper. He competed in the men's tournament at the 1952 Winter Olympics. In Finland, he represented team Ilves during 1950–1958 and won the Finnish Championship three times. (1951, 1952 and 1957). He also played in the national ice hockey team five times. He was born in Tampere.
