= Gunnar Hjeltnes =

Norwegian alpine skier (1922–2013)

Gunnar Hjeltnes (December 25, 1922 – November 7, 2013) was a Norwegian alpine skier. He was born in Ulvik Municipality. He participated at the 1952 Winter Olympics in Oslo, where he placed 7th in downhill, and also competed in slalom and giant slalom. He became Norwegian champion in downhill in 1951. Hjeltnes died in November 2013 at the age of 90.
