= Tull Gasmann =

Norwegian alpine skier (1927–2005)

Tull Gasmann (6 July 1927 – 14 December 2005) was a Norwegian alpine skier. She was born in Aker. She participated at the 1952 Winter Olympics in Oslo, where she competed in slalom and giant slalom.

She became Norwegian champion in slalom in 1951.
