= Gérard Perrier =

French cross-country skier (1928–2012)

Personal information
- Full name: Gérard Maurice Perrier
- Nationality: French
- Born: 5 January 1928; Les Molunes, France
- Died: 11 October 2012 (aged 84); Prénovel, France

Sport
- Sport: Cross-country skiing

Gérard Perrier (5 January 1928 – 11 October 2012) was a French cross-country skier who competed in the 1940s and in the 1950s. In 1948, he was a member of the French relay team, which finished seventh in the 4 x 10 km relay. Four years later, he finished 25th in the 18 km event at the 1952 Winter Olympics in Oslo.
