= Pentti Alonen =

Finnish alpine skier (1925–2017)

Pentti Johannes Alonen (15 September 1925 – 28 November 2017) was a Finnish alpine skier who competed in the 1948 Winter Olympics, in the 1952 Winter Olympics, and in the 1956 Winter Olympics.

Alonen was born in Janakkala. He was the brother of fellow Olympian Pekka Alonen. He died in Hämeenlinna on 28 November 2017, aged 92.
