= Yngvar Karlsen =

Norwegian speed skater

Personal information
- Nationality: Norwegian
- Born: 4 June 1920 Eidanger, Norway
- Died: 28 July 2001 (aged 81)

Sport
- Sport: Speed skating

Yngvar Hafsund Karlsen (4 June 1920 – 28 July 2001) was a Norwegian speed skater, born in Eidanger Municipality. He competed at the 1952 Winter Olympics in Oslo, in 5,000 and 10,000 m.
