= Ion Sumedrea =

Romanian cross-country skier (born 1925)

Ion Sumedrea (born 15 April 1925) is a Romanian cross-country skier who competed in the 1950s. He finished 23rd in the 50 km event at the 1952 Winter Olympics in Oslo. He was born in Fundata, Brașov County.
