= Walter Rinder =

American poet

Walter Rinder (born June 3, 1934) is an American humanist poet, philosopher, and photographer, whose books of inspirational poetry on love were popular in the 1960s and 70s. His public image was that of a free-spirited hippie artist. His books featured his photographs of nature and the male nude. When sales declined in the harder-edged culture of the 1980s, and Rinder found it difficult to get his books published, he supplemented his income by selling collectibles. In the 1990s Rinder's creativity diminished; he stated "my heart lies in the 60's and 70's". His work has been referred to by Reginald Shepherd in Orpheus in the Bronx as not "what could be called real poetry" along with verse of Rod McKuen. In a 2020 interview with an Australian podcaster, Rinder stated "I tried to write simple. I was trying to use simple words, not intellectual and all that. Because I wanted to reach the simplest of people and young people especially, because they have their whole life ahead of them. So, I used simple words and I tried to do that to reach the young people who are starting out in life and building their future. So that's why, when intellectuals read my books they say 'oh how trite that writing is' - it isn't. I'm reaching the people I want to reach". Rinder is homosexual.

== Life ==
Walter Murray Rinder was born in Chicago, Illinois before relocating to California at an early age. His father was Jewish; his mother an English-Dutch Protestant. He attended Alhambra High School and Mt. San Antonio Junior College in Pomona. From 1955 to 1957, he was in the U.S. Army. In 1959, he began working his way across the U.S., living out of a suitcase, working at jobs which included a bellhop, soap salesman, theatre set builder, ranch hand, and landscape artist's aide. "I want more out of life than most people", he wrote. In 1965 he first exhibited his photography in San Francisco, and in 1968 opened a photographic gallery. In 1969, he published his first book of photographic postcards and left San Francisco to live in the small town of Laytonville, California, where he opened a small gallery located in his home.

In 1970 relocated to Portland, Oregon, and published a book of poems Love is an Attitude. The same year he opened a gallery, This Speck of Earth in the city. In 1971 he published This Time Called Life: in 1973 it became a record album. Other books of poetry followed, including Spectrum of Love, The Humanness of You, Follow Your Heart, Only One Today, My Dearest Friend, Love Is My Reason. Will You Share With Me? and Where Will I Be Tomorrow?. Rinder's photographs appeared in the 1974 publication by James Vaughan titled Please Trust Me. In the late 1980s, Rinder returned to California to care for his aging mother, and eventually returned to Portland. In 1990 a selection of this works was published as The World I Used to Know. In 2001 Spectrum of Love Revisited was published.

As his books were his source of income, the decline in interest in Rinder's poetry resulted in financial woes, and the turning to selling collectibles for income. In a post on his Facebook page he wrote: "I have dug into dumpsters, trash cans, river boat ramps, rest stops… challenged by all weather….one nickel at a time." Rinder now cares for a handicapped friend and states that his dream is to purchase a mobile home for them both. In September 2013 wrote: "It is he and I against the world….As of today, we are still searching for bottles and cans. Trust in your feelings as they are the voices of your soul."

In 2020, Rinder was interviewed by an Australian podcaster, and spoke at length about his life as a poet. He confirmed that he had previously been working on books titled Thief of Hearts, The Hate Healer and Fishing for Stars, however these remain unpublished.

== Bibliography ==
- Love is an Attitude, 1970
- Quoted in Morrison, Eleanor S. Human Sexuality: Contemporary Perspectives. Palo Alto, Cal: Mayfield, 1977. p427, as "a sensitive description of conscious love"
- This Time Called Life, 1971, 1984
- Spectrum of Love, 1973
  - Reissued as Spectrum of love revisited 2001
  - Set to music by Paul Wesley Hofreiter as Spectrum of love : for narrator & orchestra, op. 72
- Follow Your Heart, 1973
- Only One Today 1974
- The Humanness of You, Vols 1&2, 1973–4
- My Dearest Friend 1974
- Love is my Reason, 1975
- Will You Share With Me, 1975
- Where Will I Be Tomorrow 1976
  - Review in Library Journal, 101: 1326 (1976)
- Aura of Love 1978
- Friends and Lovers 1978
- A Promise of Change 1979
- Forever Us 1981
- The World I Used to Know 1990
  - Excerpted in Selwood, Mary-Jane. On the Edge of Silence: A Mountain Anthology. Helensburgh: Springbank, 1993.
