= Pekka Alonen =

Finnish alpine skier (1929–2023)

Pekka Juho Kustaa Alonen (13 February 1929 – 26 October 2023) was a Finnish alpine skier who competed in the 1952 Winter Olympics.

Alonen was born in Janakkala on 13 February 1929, and died on 26 October 2023, at the age of 94. He was the brother of fellow Olympian Pentti Alonen.
