= Vladimír Šimůnek =

Czech cross-country skier

Vladimír Šimůnek (10 January 1928 – 5 October 2008) was a Czech cross-country skier who competed for Czechoslovakia in the 1950s. He finished 47th in the 18 km event at the 1952 Winter Olympics in Oslo.
