= Gervais Gindre =

French cross-country skier (1927–1990)

Personal information
- Full name: Gervais Clovis Gindre
- Nationality: French
- Born: 3 August 1927; Septmoncel, France
- Died: 17 June 1990 (aged 62); Saint-Claude, France

Sport
- Sport: Cross-country skiing

Gervais Clovis Gindre (3 August 1927 – 17 June 1990) was a French cross-country skier who competed in the 1950s. He finished 29th in the 50 km event at the 1952 Winter Olympics in Oslo.
