= Sverre Ingolf Haugli =

Norwegian speed skater (1925–1986)

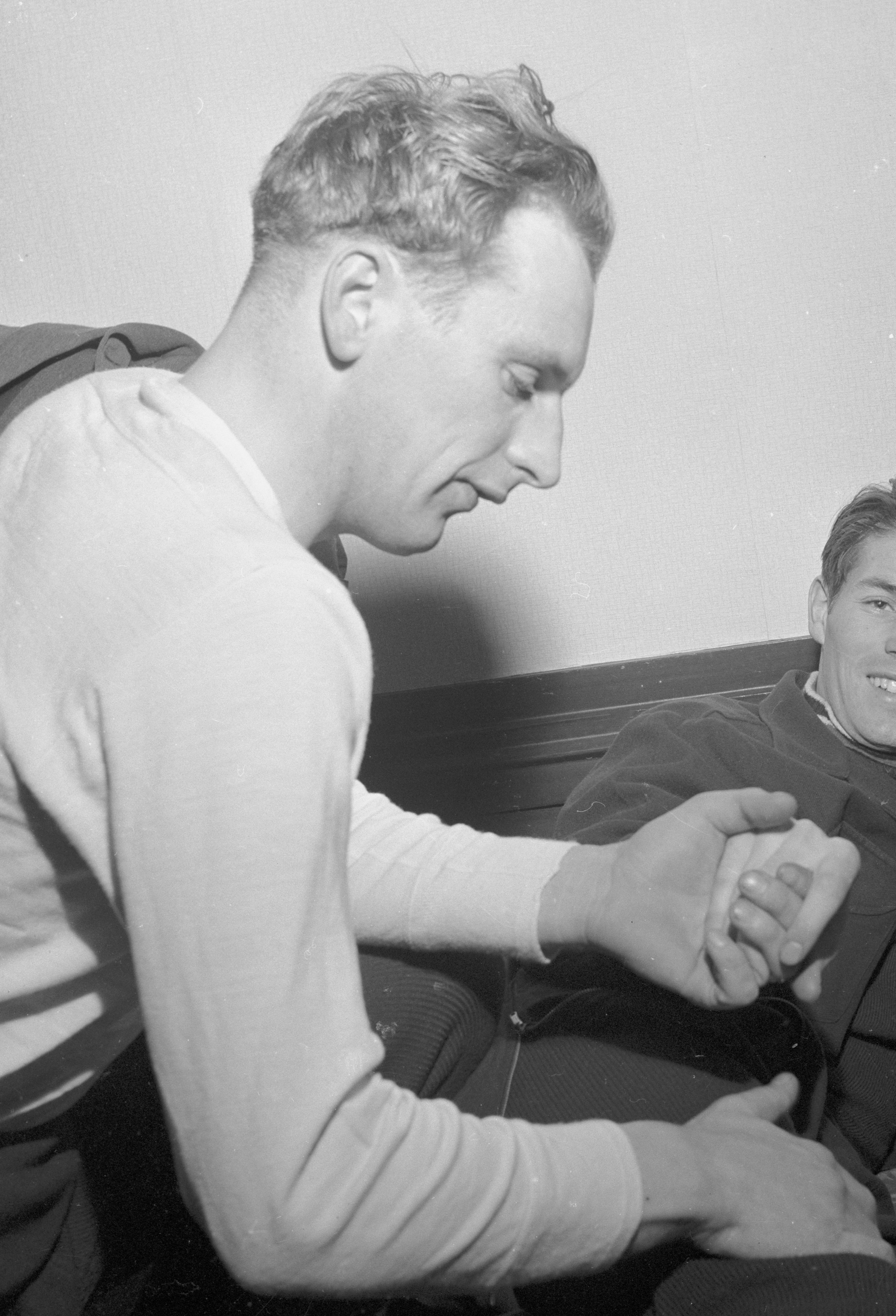
- Haugli in 1955

Personal information
- Born: 23 April 1925 Jevnaker, Norway
- Died: 18 October 1986 (aged 61) Jevnaker, Norway

Sport
- Sport: Speed skating
- Club: Jevnaker Idrettsforening; Gjøvik Skøiteklub; Oslo Skøiteklub

Achievements and titles
- Personal bests: 500 m – 44.3 (1950); 1500 m – 2:13.7 (1956); 5000 m – 8:12.5 (1956); 10,000 m – 16:40.2 (1956)
Medal record
Representing Norway
Olympic Games
Bronze medal – third place	1952 Oslo	5000 m

Sverre Ingolf Haugli (23 April 1925 – 18 October 1986) was a Norwegian speed skater. He finished third at the European Championships in 1950 and fourth in the World Championships in 1951. He won a bronze medal at the 1952 Oslo Olympics, and placed sixth over 10,000 m in 1952 and fourth in 1956.

He is the grandfather of speed skaters Maren Haugli and Sverre Haugli.

== Medals ==
An overview of medals won by Haugli at important championships he participated in, listing the years in which he won each:

Championships	Gold medal	Silver medal	Bronze medal
Winter Olympics	–	–	1952 (5,000 m)
World Allround	–	–	–
European Allround	–	–	1950
Norwegian Allround	1953	1951; 1954	–

== Personal records ==
To put these personal records in perspective, the WR column lists the official world records on the dates that Haugli skated his personal records.

Event	Result	Date	Venue	WR
500 m	44.3	26 February 1950	Gjøvik	41.8
1,000 m	1:29.4	2 February 1954	Davos	1:28.4
1,500 m	2:13.7	20 January 1956	Davos	2:09.8
3,000 m	4:47.0	5 March 1957	Årnes	4:40.2
5,000 m	8:12.5	11 February 1956	Oslo	7:45.6
10,000 m	16:40.2	21 January 1956	Davos	16:32.6

Haugli has an Adelskalender score of 188.126 points. His highest ranking on the Adelskalender was a ninth place.
