= Lauri Silván =

Finnish ice hockey player

Personal information
- Nationality: Finnish
- Born: 13 March 1932 (age 93); Tampere, Finland

Sport
- Sport: Ice hockey

Lauri Johannes Silván (born 13 March 1932) is a Finnish ice hockey player. He competed in the men's tournament at the 1952 Winter Olympics.
