= Karen-Sofie Styrmoe =

Norwegian alpine skier (1930–2001)

Personal information
- Nationality: Norwegian
- Born: 20 October 1930 Tinn Municipality, Norway
- Died: 14 July 2001 (aged 70)

Sport
- Sport: Alpine skiing

Karen-Sofie Styrmoe (20 October 1930 – 14 July 2001) was a Norwegian alpine skier. She was born in Tinn Municipality. She participated at the 1952 Winter Olympics in Oslo, where she competed in slalom and downhill.
