= Curt James Haydn =

Norwegian bobsledder

Curt James Haydn (February 12, 1919 – March 31, 1999) was a Norwegian bobsledder who competed in the early 1950s. At the 1952 Winter Olympics in Oslo, he finished 12th in the four-man and 14th in the two-man events.
