= Florea Lepădatu =

Romanian cross-country skier (1926–1981)

Florea Lepădatu (24 March 1926 – 1981) was a Romanian cross-country skier who competed in the 1950s. He finished 63rd in the 18 km event at the 1952 Winter Olympics in Oslo. He was born in Predeal.
