= Kalevi Laitinen (speed skater) =

Finnish speed skater

Veikko Kalevi Laitinen (October 3, 1919 – June 17, 1995) was a Finnish speed skater who competed in the 1948 Winter Olympics and in the 1952 Winter Olympics.

He was born in Kuusankoski and died in Kauniainen.

In 1948 he finished seventh in the 1500 metres competition, 15th in the 5000 metres event and 17th in the 500 metres competition. He also participated in the 10000 metres event but did not finish.
