= Otto Beyeler =

Swiss cross-country skier (1926–2004)

Otto Beyeler (21 July 1926 – 20 September 2004) was a Swiss cross-country skier who competed in the 1950s. He finished 15th in the 50 km event at the 1952 Winter Olympics in Oslo.
