= John C. Burton =

American cross country skier and ice hockey player

John Cotton Burton (March 12, 1923 – December 5, 2014) was an American cross-country skier who competed in the 1950s. He finished 67th in the 18 km event at the 1952 Winter Olympics in Oslo. He was born in Minneapolis, Minnesota. Burton was a Harvard University graduate, playing ice hockey while a student. After serving in the United States Navy, he enrolled in the University of Minnesota Law School. While at Minnesota, Burton picked up cross-country skiing and made the US Ski Team for the 1952 games in Oslo. He later became a financial investor and later an educator.
