= Alfred Kronig =

Swiss cross-country skier (1928–2020)

Alfred Kronig (8 November 1928 – 28 April 2020) was a Swiss cross-country skier who competed in the 1950s. He finished 30th in the 18 km event at the 1952 Winter Olympics in Oslo. He also competed at the 1956 Winter Olympics.
