= Ignácz Berecz =

Hungarian cross-country skier (1912–1997)

Ignácz Berecz (March 21, 1912 – December 29, 1997) was a Hungarian cross-country skier who competed in the 1950s. He finished 31st in the 50 km event at the 1952 Winter Olympics in Oslo.

He died in Miskolc.
