= Štefan Kovalčík =

Slovak cross-country skier (1921–1973)

Štefan Kovalčík (15 May 1921 in Švábovce – 22 October 1973 in Bratislava) was a Slovak cross-country skier who competed in the 1940s and in the 1950s.

In 1948 he finished 63rd in the 18km event. Four years later he competed again in the 18km event at the 1952 Winter Olympics in Oslo, but did not finish.
