= Hristo Donchev =

Bulgarian cross-country skier (born 1928)

Hristo Donchev Petkov (Bulgarian: Христо Дончев Петков, born 17 October 1928) was a Bulgarian cross-country skier who competed in the 1950s. He finished 25th in the 50 km event at the 1952 Winter Olympics in Oslo. He also competed in two events at the 1956 Winter Olympics.
