= Moise Crăciun =

Romanian cross-country skier (born 1927)

Moise Crăciun (born 2 June 1927) is a Romanian cross-country skier who competed in the 1950s. He finished tied for 61st in the 18 km event at the 1952 Winter Olympics in Oslo. Born in Săcele, Brașov County, he is the brother of fellow Olympian Niculae-Cornel Crăciun.
