= Kauko Salomaa =

Finnish speed skater

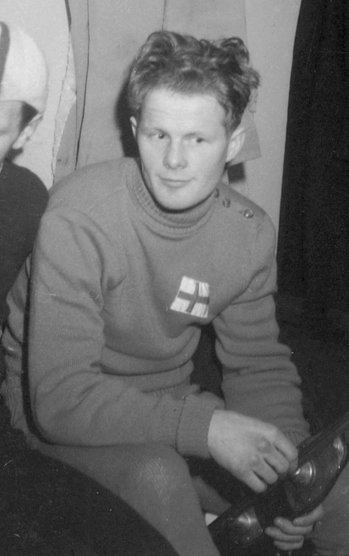
- Salomaa in 1950

Personal information
- Born: 28 February 1928 Viipuri, Finland
- Died: 29 July 2016 (aged 88)

Sport
- Sport: Speed skating
- Club: Helsingin Luistinkiitäjät, Helsinki

Achievements and titles
- Personal best(s): 500 m – 43.5 (1954); 1500 m – 2:16.3 (1956); 5000 m – 8:14.3 (1956); 10,000 m – 17:19.0 (1956)

Kauko Johannes Salomaa (28 February 1928 – 29 July 2016) was a Finnish speed skater. He competed at the 1952 and 1956 Winter Olympics in several distances with the best results of seventh in the 1500 m event in 1952.
