= Tapio Mäkelä =

Finnish cross-country skier

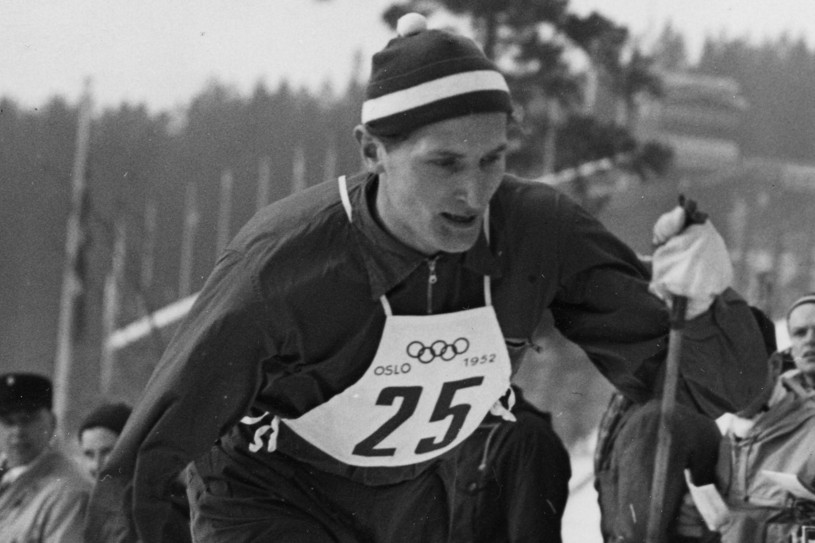

Medal record

Men's cross-country skiing

Representing Finland

Olympic Games
Gold medal – first place	1952 Oslo	4 × 10 km relay
Silver medal – second place	1952 Oslo	18 km

World Championships
Gold medal – first place	1954 Falun	4 × 10 km relay

Tapio Valfrid Mäkelä (12 October 1926 – 12 May 2016) was a Finnish cross-country skier who competed in the 1950s.

He won the 4 × 10 km relay gold and the 18 km silver at the 1952 Winter Olympics in Oslo.

Mäkelä also won a gold in the 4 × 10 km relay at the 1954 FIS Nordic World Ski Championships.

== Cross-country skiing results ==
All results are sourced from the International Ski Federation (FIS).

=== Olympic Games ===
- 2 medals – (1 gold, 1 silver)

Year	Age	18 km	50 km	4 × 10 km relay
1952	25	Silver	—	Gold

=== World Championships ===
- 1 medal – (1 gold)

Year	Age	15 km	30 km	50 km	4 × 10 km relay
1954	27	5	—	—	Gold
