= Jacques Perrier (skier) =

French cross-country skier (1929–1989)

Jacques Perrier (28 February 1929 – 4 May 1989) was a French cross-country skier who competed in the 1950s. He finished 33rd in the 18 km event at the 1952 Winter Olympics in Oslo.
