= Cross-country skiing at the 1952 Winter Olympics – Men's 50 kilometre =

Men's 50 kilometre at the VI Olympic Winter Games
- Cross-country skiing
- Venue: Holmenkollen
- Date: 20 February 1952
- Competitors: 36 from 13 nations
- Winning time: 3:33:33

Medalists
| 1st place, gold medalist(s) | | Veikko Hakulinen | Finland |
| 2nd place, silver medalist(s) | | Eero Kolehmainen | Finland |
| 3rd place, bronze medalist(s) | | Magnar Estenstad | Norway |

The 50 kilometre cross-country skiing event was part of the cross-country skiing programme at the 1952 Winter Olympics. It was the sixth appearance of the event. The competition was held on Wednesday, 20 February 1952. Thirty-six cross-country skiers from 13 nations competed.

== Medalists ==
| Gold | Silver | Bronze |
|---|---|---|
| Veikko Hakulinen; Finland | Eero Kolehmainen; Finland | Magnar Estenstad; Norway |

== Results ==
| Rank | Athlete | Time | | | |
| Rank | Athlete | At 13 km | At 32.5 km | At 42 km | Final |
|---|---|---|---|---|---|
| 1 | Veikko Hakulinen (FIN) | 50:50 | 2'03:20 | 2'59:50 | 3'33:33 |
| 2 | Eero Kolehmainen (FIN) | 51:30 | 2'05:40 | 3'02:50 | 3'38:11 |
| 3 | Magnar Estenstad (NOR) | 50:30 | 2'03:40 | 3'02:00 | 3'38:28 |
| 4 | Olav Økern (NOR) | 50:00 | 2'07:30 | 3'04:20 | 3'38:45 |
| 5 | Kalevi Mononen (FIN) | 50:20 | 2'04:40 | 3'04:00 | 3'39:21 |
| 6 | Nils Karlsson (SWE) | 51:40 | 2'07:30 | 3'04:40 | 3'39:30 |
| 7 | Edvin Landsem (NOR) | 50:30 | 2'09:30 | 3'06:10 | 3'40:43 |
| 8 | Harald Maartmann (NOR) | 49:50 | 2'06:30 | 3'05:00 | 3'43:43 |
| 9 | Pekka Kuvaja (FIN) | 53:00 | 2'10:50 | 3'09:00 | 3'46:31 |
| 10 | Anders Törnkvist (SWE) | 51:20 | 2'09:30 | 3'11:15 | 3'49:22 |
| 11 | Benoît Carrara (FRA) | 53:10 | 2'12:10 | 3'15:40 | 3'55:16 |
| 12 | Gunnar Eriksson (SWE) | 49:10 | 2'11:30 | 3'16:10 | 3'55:45 |
| 13 | Arthur Herrdin (SWE) | 50:30 | 2'13:30 | 3'18:10 | 3'57:46 |
| 14 | Jaroslav Cardal (TCH) | 54:00 | 2'18:30 | 3'22:10 | 4'01:49 |
| 15 | Otto Beyeler (SUI) | 56:40 | 2'20:20 | 3'25:50 | 4'06:15 |
| 16 | Alfred Roch (SUI) | 56:30 | 2'23:20 | 3'27:20 | 4'09:39 |
| 17 | Karl Hischier (SUI) | 57:10 | 2'22:30 | 3'31:10 | 4'13:46 |
| 18 | Severino Compagnoni (ITA) | 57:10 | 2'25:40 | 3'35:25 | 4'16:13 |
| 19 | Antenore Cuel (ITA) | 58:40 | 2'28:40 | 3'35:40 | 4'16:26 |
| 20 | Josef Schnyder (SUI) | 56:50 | 2'21:00 | 3'23:00 | 4'18:45 |
| 21 | František Balvín (TCH) | 57:30 | 2'29:50 | 3'39:15 | 4'21:19 |
| 22 | Gheorghe Olteanu (ROU) | 1:00:20 | 2'28:50 | 3'40:10 | 4'23:08 |
| 23 | Ion Sumedrea (ROU) | 1:01:00 | 2'30:40 | 3'41:10 | 4'24:45 |
| 24 | Dumitru Frăţilă (ROU) | 59:00 | 2'27:10 | 3'43:05 | 4'30:13 |
| 25 | Hristo Donchev (BUL) | 1'00:00 | 2'27:00 | 3'43:50 | 4'30:35 |
| 26 | Juku Pent (GER) | 56:50 | 2'29:30 | 3'45:45 | 4'30:56 |
| 27 | Pál Sajgó (HUN) | 1'01:10 | 2'32:00 | 3'47:05 | 4'38:34 |
| 28 | Gervais Gindre (FRA) | 59:00 | 2'30:20 | 3'48:00 | 4'39:31 |
| 29 | Ívar Stefánsson (ISL) | 58:10 | 2'30:00 | 3'48:30 | 4'39:50 |
| 30 | Jón Kristjánsson (ISL) | 57:30 | 2'30:00 | 3'47:30 | 4'41:32 |
| 31 | Ignácz Berecz (HUN) | 1'02:10 | 2'39:10 | 3'58:35 | 4'46:23 |
| 32 | Ion Hebedeanu (ROU) | 1'02:30 | 2'37:30 | 4'00:30 | 4'47:58 |
| 33 | Matthias Kristjánsson (ISL) | 59:50 | 2'35:40 | 3'55:50 | 4'48:47 |
| - | Cedric Sloane (AUS) | 1'07:50 | 2'58:40 | DNF | - |
| - | Karl Schüssler (GER) | 59:20 | 2'35:30 | DNF | - |
| - | Bruce Haslingden (AUS) | 1'06:10 | 2'54:00 | DNF | - |
