= Hubert Egger =

German cross-country skier (1927–2014)

Hubert Egger (4 June 1927 in Bernau am Chiemsee - 3 December 2014 in Prien am Chiemsee) was a West German cross-country skier who competed in the 1950s. He competed in the 18 km event at the 1952 Winter Olympics in Oslo, but did not finish.
