= Friedrich Krischan =

Austrian cross-country skier

Friedrich "Fritz" Krischan (August 11, 1920 – March 11, 2007) was an Austrian cross-country skier who competed in the 1950s. He finished 43rd in the 18 km event at the 1952 Winter Olympics in Oslo. Krischan worked as a police officer and remained active in ski clubs and ski coaching for the majority of his life.
