= Albert Mohr =

German cross-country skier (1929–2005)

Albert Mohr (2 July 1929 – 15 June 2005) was a West German cross-country skier who competed in the 1950s. He finished 65th in the 18 km event at the 1952 Winter Olympics in Oslo.
