= Gheorghe Olteanu =

Romanian cross-country skier (born 1926)

Gheorghe Olteanu (born 21 May 1926) is a Romanian cross-country skier who competed in the 1950s. He finished 22nd in the 50 km event at the 1952 Winter Olympics in Oslo. He was born in Fundata, Brașov County.
