= Niculae-Cornel Crăciun =

Romanian Nordic skier (born 1925)

Personal information
- Born: 29 July 1925 Crucea de Sus, Kingdom of Romania

Sport
- Sport: Skiing

Niculae-Cornel Crăciun (born 29 July 1925) is a Romanian Nordic skier who competed in the 1950s. At the 1952 Winter Olympics, he finished 19th in the Nordic combined event and 68th in the 18 km cross-country skiing event. At the 1948 Winter Olympics he participated in the demonstration sport military patrol and finished seventh as a member of the Romanian team.

Born in Crucea de Sus, Suceava County, he is the brother of fellow Olympian Moise Crăciun.
