= Walter Lötscher =

Swiss cross-country skier (1923–2013)

Walter Lötscher (11 August 1923 – 5 May 2013) was a Swiss cross-country skier who competed in the 1950s. He finished 35th in the 18 km event at the 1952 Winter Olympics in Oslo.
