= Heikki Hasu =

Finnish Nordic skier (1926–2025)

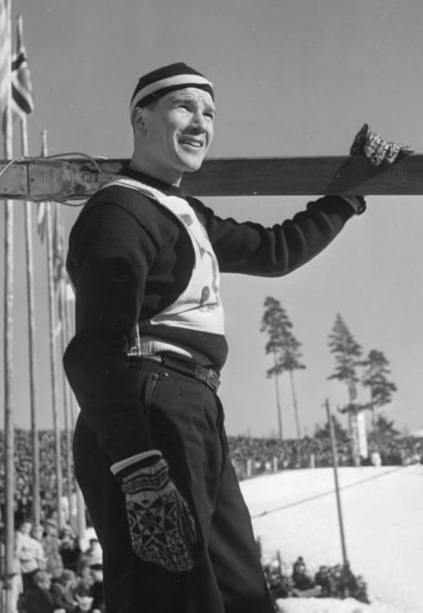
- Hasu circa 1950

Personal information
- Born: 21 March 1926 Sippola, Finland
- Died: 5 April 2025 (aged 99)
- Height: 176 cm (5 ft 9 in)
- Weight: 68 kg (150 lb)

Sport
- Sport: Nordic skiing
- Club: Myllykosken Kilpa-Veikot
Medal record
Representing Finland
Men's cross-country skiing
Olympic Games
Gold medal – first place	1952 Oslo	4 × 10 km relay
World Championships
Silver medal – second place	1950 Lake Placid	4 × 10 km relay
Men's Nordic combined
Olympic Games
Gold medal – first place	1948 St. Moritz	Individual
Silver medal – second place	1952 Oslo	Individual
World Championships
Gold medal – first place	1950 Lake Placid	Individual

Heikki Vihtori Hasu (21 March 1926 – 5 April 2025) was a Finnish Nordic skier who competed in the 1948 and 1952 Olympics.

== Career ==
Hasu won a gold and a silver medal in the individual Nordic combined event, respectively, and a gold in the 4 × 10 km cross-country relay in 1952. He placed fourth in the individual 18 km race at both Olympics, losing the bronze medal by seconds and served as the Finnish flag bearer in 1952.

Hasu won two medals at the 1950 FIS Nordic World Ski Championships, with a gold in the Nordic combined and a silver in the 4 × 10 km relay. He won the Nordic combined event at the Holmenkollen ski festival in 1953. Hasu became the first Finn to be awarded the Holmenkollen medal in 1952 (shared with Stein Eriksen, Torbjørn Falkanger and Nils Karlsson). He was also the last Holmenkollen medalist to win in more than one Nordic skiing discipline. Hasu was selected as the Finnish Sportsperson of the Year in 1948 and 1950.

Hasu was a farmer, and after retiring from competitions served two terms in the Parliament of Finland in 1962–66 and 1967–70. A statue in his honor stands in Anjalankoski.

== Death ==
Hasu died on 5 April 2025, at the age of 99.

== Cross-country skiing results ==
All results are sourced from the International Ski Federation (FIS).

=== Olympic Games ===
- 1 medal – (1 gold)

Year	Age	18 km	50 km	4 × 10 km relay
1948	21	4	—	—
1952	25	4	—	Gold

=== World Championships ===
- 1 medal – (1 silver)

Year	Age	18 km	50 km	4 × 10 km relay
1950	23	—	—	Silver
