= FIS Nordic World Ski Championships 1950 =

International Nordic skiing competition

- Host city: Lake Placid, New York, Rumford, Maine
- Country: USA
- Events: 5
- Opening: 1 February 1950
- Closing: 6 February 1950

The FIS Nordic World Ski Championships 1950 took place during February 1–6, 1950 in Lake Placid, New York, United States and Rumford, Maine, United States. This was Lake Placid's second time hosting the championships after having done so at the 1932 Winter Olympics. It also marked the first time after World War II the event took place after the Winter Olympics in a non-Olympic year (St. Moritz, Switzerland hosted the 1948 Winter Olympics two years earlier), the second time the world championships occurred outside Europe, the first time they had occurred outside Europe in a non-Olympic year, and the only time the United States has hosted the event in a non-Olympic year. The ski-jumping events were held at Lake Placid, while the cross-country skiing events (originally planned to also be held at Lake Placid) were moved to Rumford due to insufficient snow.

== Men's cross country ==
=== 18 km ===
February 3, 1950

Medal	Athlete	Time
Gold	Karl-Erik Åström (SWE)	1:06:16
Silver	Enar Josefsson (SWE)	1:06:28
Bronze	Arnljot Nyaas (NOR)	1:07:07

=== 50 km ===
February 6, 1950

Medal	Athlete	Time
Gold	Gunnar Eriksson (SWE)	2:59:05
Silver	Enar Josefsson (SWE)	3:00:01
Bronze	Nils Karlsson (SWE)	3:00:10

=== 4 × 10 km relay ===
February 5, 1950

Medal	Team	Time
Gold	Sweden (Nils Täpp, Karl-Erik Åström, Martin Lundström, Enar Josefsson)	2:39:59
Silver	Finland (Heikki Hasu, Viljo Vellonen, Paavo Lonkila, August Kiuru)	2:41:51
Bronze	Norway (Martin Stokken, Eilert Dahl, Kristian Bjørn, Henry Hermansen)	2:47:19

== Men's Nordic combined ==
=== Individual ===
February 1, 1950 - Jumping February 3, 1950 – 18 km (included in the "Special 18km-run")

Medal	Athlete	Points
Gold	Heikki Hasu (FIN)	455.2
Silver	Ottar Gjermundshaug (NOR)	452.0
Bronze	Simon Slåttvik (NOR)	451.8

== Men's ski jumping ==
=== Individual large hill ===
February 5, 1950 MacKenzie Intervale Ski Jumping Complex

Medal	Athlete	Points
Gold	Hans Bjørnstad (NOR)	220.4
Silver	Thure Lindgren (SWE)	214.4
Bronze	Arnfinn Bergmann (NOR)	213.5

== Medal table ==
Rank	Nation	Gold	Silver	Bronze	Total
1	Sweden (SWE)	3	3	1	7
2	Norway (NOR)	1	1	4	6
3	Finland (FIN)	1	1	0	2
Totals (3 entries)		5	5	5	15
