= Arrigo Delladio =

Italian cross-country skier

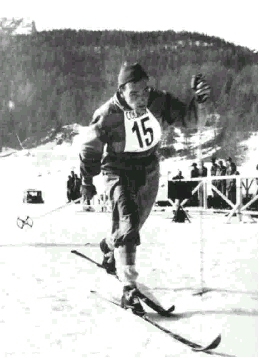
Arrigo Delladio

Arrigo Delladio (1 November 1928 in Tesero – 12 September 2015 in Cavalese) was an Italian cross-country skier who competed in the 1950s. He finished 24th in the 18 km event at the 1952 Winter Olympics in Oslo.

Further notable results:

- 1953: 3rd, Italian men's championships of cross-country skiing, 15 km
- 1954:
  - 1st, Italian men's championships of cross-country skiing, 30 km
  - 2nd, Italian men's championships of cross-country skiing, 15 km
- 1955:
  - 2nd, Italian men's championships of cross-country skiing, 30 km
  - 3rd, Italian men's championships of cross-country skiing, 15 km
- 1958: 2nd, Italian men's championships of cross-country skiing, 50 km
