= Kauko Mäkinen =

Finnish ice hockey player

Personal information
- Nationality: Finnish
- Born: 20 July 1927 Tampere, Finland
- Died: 5 August 1968 (aged 41) Tampere, Finland

Sport
- Sport: Ice hockey

Kauko Kalle Mäkinen (20 July 1927 – 5 August 1968) was a Finnish ice hockey player. He competed in the men's tournament at the 1952 Winter Olympics.
