= Petar Kovachev =

Bulgarian cross-country skier (1922–1976)

Peter Nikolov Kovachev on a ski trip

Petar Nikolov Kovachev (Bulgarian: Петър Ковачев, 10 July 1922 – 7 April 1976) was a Bulgarian cross-country skier who competed in the 1950s. He competed at the 1952 Winter Olympics in Oslo in the 4 x 10 km relay, but one of his teammates did not finish. He also finished 60th in the 18 km event. He competed for Ski Club Slavia Sofia. From 1958 he was a member of the Central Ski-Section, which was transformed to Bulgarian Ski Federation in 1961. From 1967 he was the first chairman of the committee for ski jumping and northern combined at the federation for a period of 10 years, and from 1968 he was a member of the committee for cross country.

Kovachev died on 7 April 1976, at the age of 53.
