= Ivan Staykov =

Bulgarian cross-country skier (1926–2003)

Ivan Kostadinov Staykov (Bulgarian: Иван Костадинов Стайков, October 24, 1926 – April 6, 2003) was a Bulgarian cross-country skier who competed in the 1950s.

He was born in Kazanlak and died in Sofia.

He finished 49th in the 18 km event at the 1952 Winter Olympics in Oslo.
