= Boris Stoev =

Bulgarian cross-country skier (1926–1998)

Boris Stoev (Bulgarian: Борис Стоев, 11 December 1926 – 16 September 1998) was a Bulgarian cross-country skier who competed in the 1950s. He finished 42nd in the 18 km event at the 1952 Winter Olympics in Oslo.
