= Vasil Gruev =

Bulgarian cross-country skier (born 1926)

Vasil Gruev (Bulgarian: Васил Груев, born 23 November 1926) was a Bulgarian cross-country skier who competed in the 1950s. He finished 49th in the 18 km event at the 1952 Winter Olympics in Oslo.
