= Cedric Sloane =

Australian cross-country skier (1915–1992)

Cedric Hay Sloane (19 October 1915 – 6 February 1992) was an Australian cross-country skier who competed in the 1950s. At the 1952 Winter Olympics in Oslo, he finished 75th in the 18 km event and competed in the 50 km event, but did not finish. He attended The Geelong College between 1928 and 1934.

== See also ==
- Australia at the 1952 Winter Olympics
- The Ice Dream
