= Cross-country skiing at the 1952 Winter Olympics =

Cross-country skiing at the VI Olympic Winter Games
- Venue: Holmenkollen
- Dates: 18–23 February
- No. of events: 4
- Competitors: 138 from 19 nations

The 1952 Winter Olympics cross-country skiing competition consisted of three events for men (18 km, 50 km and 4 × 10 km relay) and the first women's cross-country competition at an Olympic Games, of 10 km. The competitions were held from Monday, 18 February to Saturday, 23 February 1952.

== Medal summary ==
=== Medal table ===
Rank	Nation	Gold	Silver	Bronze	Total
1	Finland	3	3	2	8
2	Norway	1	1	1	3
3	Sweden	0	0	1	1
Totals (3 entries)		4	4	4	12

=== Men's events ===
Event	Gold	Silver	Bronze
18 km	Hallgeir Brenden; Norway	Tapio Mäkelä; Finland	Paavo Lonkila; Finland
50 km	Veikko Hakulinen; Finland	Eero Kolehmainen; Finland	Magnar Estenstad; Norway
4 × 10 km relay	Finland; Heikki Hasu; Paavo Lonkila; Urpo Korhonen; Tapio Mäkelä	Norway; Magnar Estenstad; Mikal Kirkholt; Martin Stokken; Hallgeir Brenden	Sweden; Nils Täpp; Sigurd Andersson; Enar Josefsson; Martin Lundström

=== Women's events ===
Event	Gold	Silver	Bronze
10 km	Lydia Wideman; Finland	Mirja Hietamies; Finland	Siiri Rantanen; Finland

== Participating nations ==
A total of 138 cross-country skiers from 19 nations competed at the Oslo Games:

- Australia (2)
- Austria (10)
- Bulgaria (6)
- Canada (2)
- Czechoslovakia (5)
- Finland (17)
- France (8)
- Germany (9)
- Hungary (2)
- Iceland (6)
- Italy (11)
- Japan (2)
- Norway (15)
- Poland (1)
- Romania (9)
- Sweden (15)
- Switzerland (9)
- United States (7)
- Yugoslavia (2)
