= Swiss Alpine Ski Championships =

Skiing competition in Switzerland

Swiss Alpine Ski Championships Schweizer Alpine Skimeisterschaften
- Sport: Alpine skiing
- Founded: 1934
- Country: Switzerland
- Website: Swiss Ski

The Swiss Alpine Ski Championships (German: Schweizer Alpine Skimeisterschaften) are the national championships in alpine skiing, organised every year by the Swiss Ski Federation.

== Results ==
=== Downhill ===
Year	Men	Women
1934	David Zogg	not assigned
1935	Fritz Steuri	not assigned
1936	Hans Schlunegger	Nini von Arx-Zogg
1937	Heinz von Allmen	Elvira Osirnig
1938	Hellmut Lantschner Germany	Laila Schou Nilsen Norway
1939	Karl Molitor	Erna Steuri
1940	Albert Scheuing	Erna Steuri
1941	Gerhard Olinger	Clara Bertsch
1942	Heinz von Allmen	Hedy Schlunegger
1943	Fritz Kaufmann	Antoinette Meyer
1944	Fritz Kaufmann	Hedy Schlunegger
1945	Rudolf Graf	Rosmarie Bleuer
1946	Karl Molitor	Hedy Schlunegger
1947	Ralph Olinger	Hedy Schlunegger
1948	Ralph Olinger	Lina Mittner
1949	Ralph Olinger	Rosmarie Bleuer
1950	Adolf Odermatt	Idly Walpoth
1951	Bernhard Perren	Idly Walpoth
1952	Bernhard Perren	Ida Schöpfer
1953	Fred Rubi	Ida Schöpfer
1954	Fred Rubi	Frieda Dänzer
1955	Martin Julen	Madeleine Berthod
1956	not assigned	not assigned
1957	Roland Bläsi	Margrit Gertsch
1958	Roger Staub	Hedy Beeler
1959	Willi Forrer	Yvonne Rüegg
1960	Willi Forrer	Margrit Gertsch
1961	not assigned	not assigned
1962	Willi Forrer	Theres Obrecht
1963	Jos Minsch	Theres Obrecht
1964	Jos Minsch	Theres Obrecht
1965	Dumeng Giovanoli	Heidi Obrecht
1966	Jos Minsch	Heidi Obrecht
1967	Dumeng Giovanoli	Madeleine Wuilloud
1968	Jean-Daniel Dätwyler	Annerösli Zryd
1969	Jean-Daniel Dätwyler	Vreni Inäbnit
1970	Bernhard Russi	Michèle Rubli
1971	Bernhard Russi	Vreni Inäbnit
1972	Walter Tresch	Marie-Thérèse Nadig
1973	not assigned	not assigned
1974	René Berthod	Bernadette Zurbriggen
1975	Philippe Roux	Bernadette Zurbriggen
1976	Philippe Roux	Bernadette Zurbriggen
1977	not assigned	not assigned
1978	Silvano Meli	Bernadette Zurbriggen
1979	Peter Müller	Bernadette Zurbriggen
1980	Peter Müller	Annemarie Bischofberger
1981	Toni Bürgler	Hanni Wenzel Liechtenstein
1982	Peter Müller	Doris De Agostini
1983	Conradin Cathomen	Doris De Agostini
1984	Urs Räber	Michela Figini
1985	Peter Müller	Michela Figini
1986	Karl Alpiger	Zoë Haas
1987	Daniel Mahrer	Maria Walliser
1988	William Besse	Heidi Zeller-Bähler
1989	Franz Heinzer	Michela Figini
1990	Franz Heinzer	Heidi Zeller-Bähler
1991	Franz Heinzer	Chantal Bournissen
1992	William Besse	Chantal Bournissen
1993	Daniel Mahrer	Heidi Zeller-Bähler
1994	Franz Heinzer	Heidi Zeller-Bähler
1995	Daniel Mahrer	Heidi Zurbriggen
1996	Bruno Kernen	Corinne Rey-Bellet
1997	William Besse	Sylviane Berthod
1998	Didier Cuche	Sylviane Berthod
1999	Paul Accola	Sylviane Berthod
2000	Marco Büchel Liechtenstein	Corinne Rey-Bellet
2001	Silvano Beltrametti	Corinne Rey-Bellet
2002	not assigned	not assigned
2003	Didier Défago	Nadia Styger
2004	not assigned	not assigned
2005	Bruno Kernen	Nadia Styger
2006	Didier Cuche	Nadia Styger
2007	Tobias Grünenfelder	Sylviane Berthod
2008	not assigned	not assigned
2009	Tobias Grünenfelder	Martina Schild
2010	Patrick Küng	Nadja Kamer
2011	Didier Cuche	Marianne Abderhalden
2012	Vitus Lüönd	Fränzi Aufdenblatten
2013	Sandro Viletta	Andrea Dettling
2014	Urs Kryenbühl	Corinne Suter
2015	Mauro Caviezel	Dominique Gisin
2016	Niels Hintermann	Fabienne Suter
2017	Beat Feuz	Corinne Suter
2018	Marco Odermatt	Priska Nufer
2019	Urs Kryenbühl	Corinne Suter

=== Super-G ===
Yeae	Men	Women
1988	Thomas Bürgler	not assigned
1989	Pirmin Zurbriggen	Zoë Haas
1990	Daniel Mahrer	Maria Walliser
1991	Daniel Mahrer	Chantal Bournissen
1992	William Besse	Madlen Summermatter
1993	Daniel Caduff	Heidi Zeller-Bähler
1994	Franz Heinzer	Heidi Zeller-Bähler
1995	Marco Hangl	Heidi Zeller-Bähler
1996	Bruno Kernen	Heidi Zurbriggen
1997	Paul Accola	Monika Tschirky
1998	Didier Cuche	Corinne Rey-Bellet
1999	Paul Accola	Nadia Styger
2000	Jürg Grünenfelder	Nadia Styger
2001	Silvano Beltrametti	Corinne Rey-Bellet
2002	not assigned	Tamara Müller
2003	Didier Cuche	Tanja Pieren
2004	Konrad Hari	Fränzi Aufdenblatten
2005	Tobias Grünenfelder	Miriam Gmür
2006	Tobias Grünenfelder	Nadia Styger
2007	Didier Cuche	Lara Gut
2008	Didier Cuche	Fränzi Aufdenblatten
2009	Tobias Grünenfelder	Fabienne Suter
2010	Tobias Grünenfelder	not assigned
2011	Christian Spescha	Jasmine Flury
2012	Thomas Tumler	Fränzi Aufdenblatten
2013	Sandro Viletta	Andrea Dettling
2014	Mauro Caviezel	Nadja Kamer
2015	Fernando Schmed	Jasmina Suter
2016	Niels Hintermann	Denise Feierabend
2017	Gino Caviezel	Corinne Suter
2018	Marco Odermatt	Nathalie Gröbli
2019	Gilles Roulin	Corinne Suter

=== Giant slalom ===
Yeae	Men	Women
1951	Bernhard Perren	Ida Schöpfer
1952	Kar Gamma	Madeleine Berthod
1953	René Rey	Ida Schöpfer
1954	Georges Schneider	Ida Schöpfer
1955	Raymond Fellay	Ruth Fridlin
1956	Raymond Fellay	Madeleine Berthod
1957	Roger Staub	Frieda Dänzer
1958	Roger Staub	Frieda Dänzer
1959	Roger Staub	Madeleine Berthod
1960	Roger Staub	Madeleine Berthod
1961	Roger Staub	Liselotte Michel
1962	Robert Grünenfelder	Theres Obrecht
1963	Jos Minsch	Theres Obrecht
1964	Stefan Kälin	Theres Obrecht
1965	Edmund Bruggmann	Theres Obrecht
1966	Edmund Bruggmann	Theres Obrecht
1967	not assigned	not assigned
1968	Dumeng Giovanoli	Fernande Bochatay
1969	Dumeng Giovanoli	Fernande Bochatay
1970	Jakob Tischhauser	Michèle Rubli
1971	Hans Zingre	Rita Good
1972	Werner Mattle	Lise-Marie Morerod
1973	Adolf Rösti	Bernadette Zurbriggen
1974	Heini Hemmi	Lise-Marie Morerod
1975	Heini Hemmi	Lise-Marie Morerod
1976	Ernst Good	Marie-Thérèse Nadig
1977	Peter Müller	Lise-Marie Morerod
1978	Heini Hemmi	Lise-Marie Morerod
1979	Peter Lüscher	Hanni Wenzel Liechtenstein
1980	Joël Gaspoz	Marie-Thérèse Nadig
1981	Joël Gaspoz	Erika Hess
1982	Peter Lüscher	Ursula Konzett Liechtenstein
1983	Max Julen	Erika Hess
1984	Thomas Bürgler	Erika Hess
1985	Thomas Bürgler	Maria Walliser
1986	Pirmin Zurbriggen	Erika Hess
1987	Pirmin Zurbriggen	Vreni Schneider
1988	Joël Gaspoz	Michela Figini
1989	Pirmin Zurbriggen	Vreni Schneider
1990	Martin Knöri	Zoë Haas
1991	Urs Kälin	Vreni Schneider
1992	Ivan Eggenberger	Heidi Zurbriggen
1993	Marco Hangl	Sonja Nef
1994	not assigned	Vreni Schneider
1995	Urs Kälin	Corinne Rey-Bellet
1996	Urs Kälin	Corinne Rey-Bellet
1997	Michael von Grünigen	Karin Roten
1998	Steve Locher	Sylviane Berthod
1999	Didier Plaschy	Birgit Heeb Liechtenstein
2000	Marco Büchel Liechtenstein	Sonja Nef
2001	Michael von Grünigen	Sonja Nef
2002	not assigned	Sonja Nef
2003	Daniel Albrecht	Fabienne Suter
2004	Didier Défago	Lilian Kummer
2005	Marc Berthod	Marlies Oester
2006	Marc Gini	Tina Weirather Liechtenstein
2007	Marc Berthod	Pascale Berthod
2008	Daniel Albrecht	Fränzi Aufdenblatten
2009	Didier Cuche	Rabea Grand
2010	Justin Murisier; Ami Oreiller	Nadja Kamer
2011	Reto Schmidiger	Tina Weirather Liechtenstein
2012	Didier Défago	Lara Gut
2013	Sandro Viletta	Noemi Rüsch
2014	Thomas Tumler	Wendy Holdener
2015	Thomas Tumler	Dominique Gisin
2016	Justin Murisier	Aline Danioth
2017	Gino Caviezel	Mélanie Meillard
2018	not assigned	Wendy Holdener
2019	Cédric Noger	Camille Rast

=== Slalom ===
Yeae	Men	Women
1934	Karl Graf	not assigned
1935	Arnold Glatthard	not assigned
1936	Jacques Ettinger	Nini von Arx-Zogg
1937	Willy Steuri	Elvira Osirnig
1938	Hellmut Lantschner Germany	Christl Cranz Germany
1939	Rudolf Rominger	Erna Steuri
1940	Rudolf Rominger	Nini von Arx-Zogg
1941	Rudolf Rominger	Elvira Osirnig
1942	Karl Molitor	Verena Fuchs
1943	Fritz Kaufmann	Verena Fuchs
1944	Otto von Allmen	Antoinette Meyer
1945	Otto von Allmen	Antoinette Meyer
1946	Franz Bumann	Elisa Conzett
1947	Ralph Olinger	Renée Clerc
1948	Karl Molitor	Olivia Ausoni
1949	Edi Rominger	Francine Éternod
1950	Franz Bumann	Renée Clerc
1951	Georges Schneider	Olivia Ausoni
1952	Fernand Grosjean	Ida Schöpfer
1953	René Rey	Madeleine Berthod
1954	Fernand Grosjean; Georges Schneider	Ida Schöpfer
1955	Fernand Grosjean	Hedy Beeler
1956	Georges Schneider	Renée Colliard
1957	Georges Schneider	Annemarie Waser
1958	Georges Schneider	Frieda Dänzer
1959	Adolf Mathis	Annemarie Waser
1960	Adolf Mathis	Liselotte Michel; Annemarie Waser
1961	Adolf Mathis	Liselotte Michel
1962	Adolf Mathis	Liselotte Michel
1963	Adolf Mathis	Sylvia Zimmermann
1964	Adolf Mathis	Fernande Bochatay
1965	Dumeng Giovanoli	Edith Hiltbrand
1966	Edmund Bruggmann	Fernande Bochatay
1967	Jakob Tischhauser	Fernande Bochatay
1968	Dumeng Giovanoli	Fernande Bochatay
1969	Dumeng Giovanoli	Catherine Cuche
1970	Edmund Bruggmann	Hedi Schillig
1971	Peter Frei	Bernadette Zurbriggen
1972	Edmund Bruggmann	Bernadette Zurbriggen
1973	Heini Hemmi	Bernadette Zurbriggen
1974	Walter Tresch	Lise-Marie Morerod
1975	Peter Lüscher	Lise-Marie Morerod
1976	Heini Hemmi	Marianne Jäger
1977	Paul Frommelt Liechtenstein	Lise-Marie Morerod
1978	Andreas Wenzel Liechtenstein	Lise-Marie Morerod
1979	Paul Frommelt Liechtenstein	Ursula Konzett Liechtenstein
1980	Peter Lüscher	Erika Hess
1981	Marc Girardelli Luxembourg	Erika Hess
1982	Jacques Lüthy	Erika Hess
1983	Jacques Lüthy	Brigitte Gadient
1984	Joël Gaspoz	Brigitte Gadient
1985	Jacques Lüthy	Corinne Schmidhauser
1986	Jacques Lüthy	Corinne Schmidhauser
1987	Paul Frommelt Liechtenstein	Erika Hess
1988	Hans Pieren	Vreni Schneider
1989	Patrick Staub	Vreni Schneider
1990	Paul Frommelt Liechtenstein	Brigitte Gadient
1991	Paul Accola	Gabriela Zingre-Graf
1992	Oliver Künzi	Monika Käslin
1993	Paul Accola	Vreni Schneider
1994	Andrea Zinsli	Vreni Schneider
1995	Andrea Zinsli	Vreni Schneider
1996	Michael von Grünigen	Karin Roten
1997	Michael von Grünigen; Andrea Zinsli	Gabriela Zingre-Graf
1998	Paul Accola	Karin Roten
1999	Didier Plaschy	Lilian Kummer
2000	Didier Plaschy	Sonja Nef
2001	Michael von Grünigen	Sonja Nef
2002	Urs Imboden	Marlies Oester
2003	Urs Imboden	Erika Dicht
2004	Urs Imboden	Sonja Nef
2005	Marc Gini	Marlies Oester
2006	Marc Gini	Aita Camastral
2007	Marc Gini	Aline Bonjour
2008	Daniel Albrecht	Aita Camastral
2009	Marc Gini	Jessica Pünchera
2010	Markus Vogel	Marina Nigg Liechtenstein
2011	Reto Schmidiger	Esther Good
2012	Markus Vogel	Margaux Givel
2013	Reto Schmidiger	Wendy Holdener
2014	Bernhard Niederberger	Wendy Holdener
2015	Luca Aerni	Denise Feierabend
2016	Daniel Yule	Wendy Holdener
2017	Luca Aerni	Mélanie Meillard
2018	Ramon Zenhäusern	Wendy Holdener
2019	Loïc Meillard	Wendy Holdener

=== Combined ===
Yeae	Men	Women
1936	not assigned	Nini von Arx-Zogg
1937	not assigned	Elvira Osirnig
1938	not assigned	Christl Cranz Germany
1939	not assigned	Erna Steuri
1940	not assigned	Nini von Arx-Zogg
1941	not assigned	Verena Fuchs
1942	not assigned	Verena Fuchs
1943	Fritz Kaufmann	Hedy Schlunegger
1944	Otto von Allmen	Erika Paroni-Gasche
1945	Karl Molitor	Antoinette Meyer
1946	Karl Molitor	Hedy Schlunegger
1947	Fernand Grosjean	Hedy Schlunegger
1948	Karl Molitor	Lina Mittner
1949	Rudolf Graf	Rosmarie Bleuer
1950	Alfred Rombaldi	Trina Vetsch-Steiner
1951	Fred Rubi	Olivia Ausoni
1952	René Rey	Ida Schöpfer
1953	Fred Rubi	Ida Schöpfer
1954	Georges Schneider	Ida Schöpfer
1955	Hans Forrer	Ruth Fridlin
1956	not assigned	not assigned
1957	Roland Bläsi	Margrit Gertsch
1958	Roger Staub	Frieda Dänzer
1959	Roger Staub	Annemarie Waser
1960	Roger Staub	Annemarie Waser
1961	not assigned	not assigned
1962	Willi Forrer	Theres Obrecht
1963	Jos Minsch	Sylvia Zimmermann
1964	Stefan Kälin	Theres Obrecht
1965	Edmund Bruggmann	Hiltbrand
1966	Edmund Bruggmann	Theres Obrecht
1967	Willy Favre	Hiltbrand
1968	Dumeng Giovanoli	Fernande Bochatay
1969	Dumeng Giovanoli	Fernande Bochatay
1970	Dumeng Giovanoli	Michèle Rubli
1971	Bernhard Russi	Bernadette Zurbriggen
1972	Walter Tresch	Bernadette Zurbriggen
1973	Willi Frommelt Liechtenstein	Bernadette Zurbriggen
1974	Walter Tresch	Lise-Marie Morerod
1975	Willi Frommelt Liechtenstein	Bernadette Zurbriggen
1976	Peter Lüscher	Marianne Jäger
1977	Andreas Wenzel Liechtenstein	Lise-Marie Morerod
1978	Jean-Luc Fournier	Bernadette Zurbriggen
1979	Jacques Lüthy	Erika Hess
1980	Christian Welschen	Marlies Wittenwiler
1981	Thomas Bürgler	Erika Hess
1982	Peter Müller	Brigitte Oertli
1983	Thomas Bürgler	Brigitte Gadient
1984	Thomas Bürgler	Brigitte Oertli
1985	Thomas Bürgler	Maria Walliser
1986	Gustav Oehrli	Maria Walliser
1987	Paul Accola	Maria Walliser
1988	Hans Pieren	Sandra Burn
1989	Pirmin Zurbriggen	Marlis Spescha
1990	Xavier Gigandet	Sandra Reymond
1991	Paul Accola	Manuela Heubi
1992	Patrick Staub	Heidi Zurbriggen
1993	Paul Accola	Laura Schelbert
1994	Paul Accola	Marlies Oester
1995	Bruno Kernen	Sandra Reymond
1996	Paul Accola	Corinne Rey-Bellet
1997	Paul Accola	Catherine Borghi
1998	Paul Accola	Sylviane Berthod
1999	Paul Accola	Marlies Oester
2000	Marco Büchel Liechtenstein	Tamara Schädler Liechtenstein
2001	Paul Accola	Ella Alpiger
2002	not assigned	not assigned
2003	Daniel Albrecht	Fränzi Aufdenblatten
2004	Daniel Albrecht	Eliane Volken
2005	Stéphane de Siebenthal	Marianne Abderhalden
2006	Marc Berthod	Andrea Dettling
2007	Dimitri Cuche	Aline Bonjour
2008	Marc Gini	not assigned
2009	Silvan Zurbriggen	Jessica Pünchera
2010	Justin Murisier	Nadja Kamer
2011	Beat Feuz	Marianne Abderhalden
2012	Luca Aerni	Wendy Holdener
2013	not assigned	not assigned
2014	Sandro Viletta	Wendy Holdener
2015	Loïc Meillard	Denise Feierabend
2016	Loïc Meillard	Rahel Kopp
2017	Luca Aerni	Wendy Holdener
2018	Sandro Simonet	Vivianne Härri
2019	Sandro Simonet	Priska Nufer
