= Switzerland at the 1952 Winter Olympics =

- IOC code: SUI
- NOC: Swiss Olympic Association
- Website: www.swissolympic.ch (in German and French)

in Oslo
- Competitors: 55 (46 men, 9 women) in 7 sports
- Flag bearer: Ulrich Poltera
- Medals Ranked 11th: Gold 0 Silver 0 Bronze 2 Total 2

Winter Olympics appearances (overview)
- 1924; 1928; 1932; 1936; 1948; 1952; 1956; 1960; 1964; 1968; 1972; 1976; 1980; 1984; 1988; 1992; 1994; 1998; 2002; 2006; 2010; 2014; 2018; 2022; 2026

Switzerland competed at the 1952 Winter Olympics in Oslo, Norway.

== Medalists ==
Medal	Name	Sport	Event
Bronze	Fritz Feierabend; Stephan Waser	Bobsleigh	Two-man
Bronze	Fritz Feierabend; Albert Madörin; André Filippini; Stephan Waser	Bobsleigh	Four-man

== Alpine skiing ==
Men

Athlete	Event	Race 1		Race 2		Total	
Athlete	Event	Time	Rank	Time	Rank	Time	Rank
Bernhard Perren	Downhill					2:46.1	26
Gottlieb Perren	Downhill					2:37.1	10
Georges Schneider	Downhill					2:37.0	9
Fredy Rubi	Downhill					3:32.5	4
Fredy Rubi	Giant Slalom					2:34.0	12
Fernand Grosjean	Giant Slalom					2:33.8	11
Bernhard Perren	Giant Slalom					2:33.1	8
Georges Schneider	Giant Slalom					2:31.2	5
Georges Schneider	Slalom	1:11.5	48	did not advance			
Fredy Rubi	Slalom	1:03.6	17 Q	59.7	1	2:03.3	7
Bernhard Perren	Slalom	1:03.4	16 Q	1:06.7	24	2:10.1	21
Franz Bumann	Slalom	1:02.7	15 Q	1:02.1	7	2:04.8	10

Women

Athlete	Event	Race 1		Race 2		Total	
Athlete	Event	Time	Rank	Time	Rank	Time	Rank
Silvia Glatthard	Downhill					1:54.9	15
Idly Walpoth	Downhill					1:53.8	12
Ida Schöpfer	Downhill					1:53.0	10
Madeleine Berthod-Chamot	Downhill					1:50.7	6
Madeleine Berthod-Chamot	Giant Slalom					DSQ	–
Silvia Glatthard	Giant Slalom					2:23.1	29
Idly Walpoth	Giant Slalom					2:20.8	25
Ida Schöpfer	Giant Slalom					2:16.6	16
Ida Schöpfer	Slalom	1:24.3	34	DSQ	–	DSQ	–
Edmée Abetel	Slalom	1:13.9	23	1:14.4	31	2:28.3	25
Olivia Ausoni	Slalom	1:07.4	5	1:09.6	16	2:17.0	10
Madeleine Berthod-Chamot	Slalom	1:06.7	3	1:08.2	12	2:14.9	6

== Bobsleigh ==
Sled	Athletes	Event	Run 1		Run 2		Run 3		Run 4		Total	
Sled	Athletes	Event	Time	Rank	Time	Rank	Time	Rank	Time	Rank	Time	Rank
SUI-1	Fritz Feierabend; Stephan Waser	Two-man	1:22.13	4	1:22.46	4	1:21.67	3	1:21.45	2	5:27.71	3rd place, bronze medalist(s)
SUI-2	Felix Endrich; Werner Spring	Two-man	1:22.14	5	1:22.32	3	1:22.50	4	1:22.19	4	5:29.15	4

Sled	Athletes	Event	Run 1		Run 2		Run 3		Run 4		Total	
Sled	Athletes	Event	Time	Rank	Time	Rank	Time	Rank	Time	Rank	Time	Rank
SUI-1	Fritz Feierabend; Albert Madörin; André Filippini; Stephan Waser	Four-man	1:18.67	4	1:18.08	3	1:17.40	4	1:17.55	2	5:11.70	3rd place, bronze medalist(s)
SUI-2	Felix Endrich; Fritz Stöckli; Franz Kapus; Werner Spring	Four-man	1:17.75	3	1:19.45	5	1:17.88	5	1:18.90	6	5:13.98	4

== Cross-country skiing ==
Men

Event	Athlete	Race	
Event	Athlete	Time	Rank
18 km	Karl Bricker	1'12:19	46
18 km	Josef Schnyder	1'10:51	37
18 km	Walter Lötscher	1'10:45	35
18 km	Alfred Kronig	1'10:12	30
18 km	Alfons Supersaxo	1'09:38	26
50 km	Josef Schnyder	4'18:45	20
50 km	Karl Hischier	4'13:46	17
50 km	Alfred Roch	4'09:39	16
50 km	Otto Beyeler	4'06:15	15

Men's 4 × 10 km relay

Athletes	Race	
Athletes	Time	Rank
Fritz Kocher; Walter Lötscher; Alfred Kronig; Alfons Supersaxo	2'38:00	9

== Figure skating ==
Men

Athlete	CF	FS	Points	Places	Rank
François Pache	9	11	139.922	92	9

Women

Athlete	CF	FS	Points	Places	Rank
Yolande Jobin	16	16	132.478	151	18
Susi Wirz	15	17	135.578	136	15

Pairs

Athletes	Points	Places	Rank
Silvia Grandjean; Michel Grandjean	10.300	53	7

== Ice hockey ==
The tournament was run in a round-robin format with nine teams participating.

Team	Pld	W	L	T	GF	GA	Pts
Canada	8	7	0	1	71	14	15
United States	8	6	1	1	43	21	13
Sweden	9	7	2	0	53	22	14
Czechoslovakia	9	6	3	0	50	23	12
Switzerland 5th	8	4	4	0	40	40	8
Poland	8	2	5	1	21	56	5
Finland	8	2	6	0	21	60	4
West Germany	8	1	6	1	21	53	3
Norway	8	0	8	0	15	46	0

- Switzerland 12-0 Finland
- Switzerland 6-3 Poland
- Norway 2-7 Switzerland
- USA 8-2 Switzerland
- Canada 11-2 Switzerland
- Czechoslovakia 8-3 Switzerland
- Sweden 5-2 Switzerland
- Switzerland 6-3 Germany FR

Contestants; Hans Bänninger; Gian Bazzi; François Blank; Bixio Celio; Reto Delnon; Walter Paul Dürst; Émile Golaz; Emil Handschin; Paul Hofer; Willy Pfister; Gebhard Poltera; Ulrich Poltera; Otto Schläpfer; Otto Schubiger; Alfred Streun; Hans-Martin Trepp; Paul Wyss

== Nordic combined ==
Events:

- 18 km cross-country skiing
- normal hill ski jumping

The cross-country skiing part of this event was combined with the main medal event, meaning that athletes competing here were skiing for two disciplines at the same time. Details can be found above in this article, in the cross-country skiing section.

The ski jumping (normal hill) event was held separate from the main medal event of ski jumping, results can be found in the table below (athletes were allowed to perform three jumps, the best two jumps were counted and are shown here).

Athlete	Event	Cross-country		Ski Jumping				Total	
Athlete	Event	Points	Rank	Distance 1	Distance 2	Points	Rank	Points	Rank
Alfons Supersaxo	Individual	213.696	8	60.5	62.5	201.5	9	415.196	10

== Ski jumping ==
Athlete	Event	Jump 1			Jump 2			Total	
Athlete	Event	Distance	Points	Rank	Distance	Points	Rank	Points	Rank
Fritz Schneider	Normal hill	59.5	96.0	27	59.5	93.5	30	189.5	26
Hans Däscher	Normal hill	61.0	98.5	22	60.0	100.0	17	198.5	20
Jacques Perreten	Normal hill	61.0	99.0	21	59.0	94.0	27	193.0	23
Andreas Däscher	Normal hill	62.0	102.5	15	61.0	98.0	21	200.5	16
