= European Ski Federation =

Organization governing skiing in Europe

- Jurisdiction: Europe
- Membership: Austria, France, Italy, Switzerland, Georgia, Latvia, Liechtenstein, Lithuania, Russia, Hungary, Belarus
- Abbreviation: ESF
- Founded: February 5, 2009, in Munich, Germany
- Regional affiliation: European Union
- Headquarters: Lausanne, Switzerland
- President: Klára Kaszó

The European Ski Federation (ESF) is the official federation regulating skiing within the continent of Europe and is responsible for the representation of skiing within the greater European Union over the disciplines of alpine skiing, Nordic skiing, and snowboarding. The goal of the ESF is to strengthen Europe's voice in international skiing and promoting winter tourism in Europe.

== History ==
The ESF was founded in Munich on 5 February 2009 by the four nations of Austria, France, Italy, and Switzerland. The four nations were represented by Peter Schröcksnadel, who would become the first President of the Federation for Österreichischer Skiverband, Alain Méthiaz for the Fédération Française de Ski, Giovanni Morzenti for the Federazione Italiana Sport Invernali and Dr. Urs Lehmann for Swiss-Ski, respectively.

== Members ==
The original four members are the Österreichischer Skiverband representing Austria, the Fédération Française de Ski representing France, the Federazione Italiana Sport Invernali representing Italy, and Swiss-Ski representing Switzerland. Since 2009 the number of members has increased to 11.

- Österreichischer Skiverband, Austria. President Roswitha Stadlober
- Belarusian Alpine Skiing and Snowboard Federation, Belarus, President Natalya Petkevich
- Fédération Française de Ski, France, President Michel Vion
- Winter Sports Federation of Georgia, Georgia, President George Ramishvili
- Hungarian Ski Federation, Hungary, President Dr. Klára Kaszó
- Federazione Italiana Sport Invernali, Italy, President Flavio Roda
- Latvian Ski Association, Latvia, President Vairis Brize
- Liechtensteinischer Skiverband, Liechtenstein, President Andreas Wenzel
- National Skiing Association of Lithuania, Lithuania, President Remigijus Arlauskas
- Russian Ski and Snowboard Association, Russia, President Andrey Bokarev
- Swiss Ski, Switzerland, President Dr. Urs Lehmann

=== Presidents of the ESF ===
- Peter Schröcksnadel, 2009–2012, Austria
- Dr. Klára Kaszó, 2012–2023, Hungary
- Roswitha Stadlober, 2023-, Austria

== Controversy ==
The first competition officially organised by the ESF occurred on 7 November 2009 at the Amnéville Indoor Facility in Amnéville, France officially named the "European Indoor Championships" was declared illegal by President of the International Ski Federation Gian-Franco Kasper. The two slalom races were divided into male and female with Jean-Baptiste Grange and Veronika Zuzulová receiving gold medals, respectively.
