= Men's Olympic Downhill (East Summit) =

Ski course in Lake Louise, Alberta, Canada

- Interactive map of Men's Olympic Downhill
- Location in Canada Location in Alberta
- 51°26′34.27″N 116°09′38.69″W
- Location: Lake Louise, Alberta, Canada
- Mountain: Mount Whitehorn
- Opened: 1980 (race course); 46 years ago
- Member: Club5+
- Level: expert

Downhill (men)
- Start: 2,507 m (8,225 ft) AMSL
- Finish: 1,680 m (5,512 ft)
- Vertical drop: 827 m (2,713 ft)
- Length: 3.123 km (1.94 mi)
- Max incline: 28 degrees (53%)

Super-G (men)
- Start: 2,330 m (7,644 ft) AMSL
- Finish: 1,680 m (5,512 ft)
- Vertical drop: 650 m (2,133 ft)
- Length: 2.469 km (1.53 mi)

Men's Olympic / East Summit is a World Cup downhill ski course in western Canada on Mount Whitehorn in Lake Louise, Alberta. The race course debuted in 1980.

Part of Lake Louise Ski Resort, the course has hosted 82 women's World Cup events (third all-time) and 45 events for men (13th all-time). The most recent World Cup events were held in late November and early December 2022, and no events have been held since then.

American skier Lindsey Vonn won record 18 events in total for women (14 in downhill and 4 in super-g).

Norwegian skier Aksel Lund Svindal won record 8 events in total for men (2 in downhill and 6 in super-g).

== World Cup ==
It made its World Cup debut in 1980 and hosted men's speed events irregularly; since 1999, it has been part of annual World Cup calendar. Women's events have been regularly held on the course since 1989.

Aleksander Aamodt Kilde won the most recent men's downhill in late November 2022; the full course was used at 3.087 km (1.92 mi) in length, with a vertical drop of 827 m (2,713 ft) from a starting elevation of 2,507 m (8,225 ft). His winning time of 107.98 seconds yielded an average speed of 102.919 km/h (64.0 mph) and an average vertical descent rate of 7.659 m/s (25.1 ft/s).

=== Course sections ===
- Lone Pine
- Tickety Chutes
- Upper Wiwaxy
- Coaches Corner
- Fall Away
- Fish Net
- Waterfall
- Gun Barrel
- Timing Flat
- Juniper Crossing
- Claire's Corner

=== Men ===
Event key: DH – Downhill, SG – Super giant slalom, GS – Giant slalom, SL – Slalom, KB – Combined
| No. | Type | Season | Date | Winner | Second | Third |
|---|---|---|---|---|---|---|
| 338 | DH | 1979/80 | 4 March 1980 | (Italy) Herbert Plank | (Austria) Harti Weirather | (Austria) Werner Grissmann |
| 339 | KB | 1979/80 | 27 January 1980; Chamonix (SL) --------------- 4 March 1980; Lake Louise (DH) | (Austria) Anton Steiner | (Liechtenstein) Andreas Wenzel | (United States) Phil Mahre |
| 448 | DH | 1982/83 | 12 March 1983 | (Austria) Helmut Höflehner | (Austria) Franz Klammer | (Switzerland) Conradin Cathomen |
| 721 | DH | 1990/91 | 15 March 1991 | (Norway) Atle Skårdal | (Switzerland) Franz Heinzer | (Austria) Helmut Höflehner |
| 722 | DH | 1990/91 | 16 March 1991 | (Switzerland) Franz Heinzer | (Norway) Atle Skårdal | (Austria) Patrick Ortlieb |
| 723 | SG | 1990/91 | 17 March 1991 | (Germany) Markus Wasmeier | (Italy) Patrick Holzer | (Austria) Stephan Eberharter |
| 1010 | DH | 1999/00 | 4 December 1999 | (Austria) Hannes Trinkl | (Austria) Hermann Maier | (Austria) Stephan Eberharter |
| 1011 | SG | 1999/00 | 5 December 1999 | (Austria) Hermann Maier | (Sweden) Fredrik Nyberg | (Austria) Josef Strobl |
| 1048 | DH | 2000/01 | 25 November 2000 | (Austria) Stephan Eberharter | (Switzerland) Silvano Beltrametti | (Norway) Lasse Kjus |
| 1049 | SG | 2000/01 | 26 November 2000 | (Austria) Hermann Maier | (Norway) Lasse Kjus | (Austria) Andreas Schifferer |
| | DH | 2001/02 | 22 November 2001 | cancelled; replaced in Val Gardena on 14 December 2001 | | |
| | SG | 2001/02 | 23 November 2001 | cancelled; replaced in Garmisch-Partenkirchen on 26 January 2002 | | |
| 1116 | DH | 2002/03 | 30 November 2002 | (Austria) Stephan Eberharter | (Austria) Hannes Trinkl | (Norway) Kjetil André Aamodt |
| 1117 | SG | 2002/03 | 1 December 2002 | (Austria) Stephan Eberharter | (Austria) Josef Strobl | (Switzerland) Didier Cuche |
| 1153 | DH | 2003/04 | 29 November 2003 | (Austria) Michael Walchhofer | (Canada) Erik Guay | (France) Antoine Dénériaz |
| 1154 | SG | 2003/04 | 30 November 2003 | (Austria) Hermann Maier | (Austria) Michael Walchhofer | (Austria) Stephan Eberharter |
| 1190 | DH | 2004/05 | 27 November 2004 | (United States) Bode Miller | (France) Antoine Dénériaz | (Austria) Michael Walchhofer |
| 1191 | SG | 2004/05 | 28 November 2004 | (United States) Bode Miller | (Austria) Hermann Maier | (Austria) Michael Walchhofer |
| 1226 | DH | 2005/06 | 26 November 2005 | (Austria) Fritz Strobl | (Norway) Kjetil André Aamodt | (Liechtenstein) Marco Büchel |
| 1227 | SG | 2005/06 | 27 November 2005 | (Norway) Aksel Lund Svindal | (Austria) Benjamin Raich | (United States) Daron Rahlves |
| 1263 | DH | 2006/07 | 25 November 2006 | (Liechtenstein) Marco Büchel | (Canada) Manuel Osborne-Paradis | (Italy) Peter Fill |
| 1264 | SG | 2006/07 | 26 November 2006 | (Canada) John Kucera | (Austria) Mario Scheiber | (Sweden) Patrik Järbyn |
| 1300 | DH | 2007/08 | 24 November 2007 | (Canada) Jan Hudec | (United States) Marco Sullivan | (Austria) Andreas Buder |
| 1301 | SG | 2007/08 | 25 November 2007 | (Norway) Aksel Lund Svindal | (Austria) Benjamin Raich | (Switzerland) Didier Cuche |
| 1340 | DH | 2008/09 | 29 November 2008 | (Italy) Peter Fill | (Switzerland) Carlo Janka | (Sweden) Hans Olsson |
| 1341 | SG | 2008/09 | 30 November 2008 | (Austria) Hermann Maier | (Canada) John Kucera | (Switzerland) Didier Cuche |
| 1376 | DH | 2009/10 | 28 November 2009 | (Switzerland) Didier Cuche | (Italy) Werner Heel | (Switzerland) Carlo Janka |
| 1377 | SG | 2009/10 | 29 November 2009 | (Canada) Manuel Osborne-Paradis | (Austria) Benjamin Raich | (Austria) Michael Walchhofer |
| 1409 | DH | 2010/11 | 27 November 2010 | (Austria) Michael Walchhofer | (Austria) Mario Scheiber (Norway) Aksel Lund Svindal | |
| 1410 | SG | 2010/11 | 28 November 2010 | (Switzerland) Tobias Grünenfelder | (Switzerland) Didier Cuche | (Austria) Romed Baumann |
| 1445 | DH | 2011/12 | 26 November 2011 | (Switzerland) Didier Cuche | (Switzerland) Beat Feuz | (Austria) Hannes Reichelt |
| 1446 | SG | 2011/12 | 27 November 2011 | (Norway) Aksel Lund Svindal | (Switzerland) Didier Cuche | (France) Adrien Théaux |
| 1490 | DH | 2012/13 | 24 November 2012 | (Norway) Aksel Lund Svindal | (Austria) Max Franz | (Austria) Klaus Kröll (United States) Marco Sullivan |
| 1491 | SG | 2012/13 | 25 November 2012 | (Norway) Aksel Lund Svindal | (France) Adrien Théaux | (Austria) Joachim Puchner |
| 1524 | DH | 2013/14 | 30 November 2013 | (Italy) Dominik Paris | (Austria) Klaus Kröll | (France) Adrien Théaux |
| 1525 | SG | 2013/14 | 1 December 2013 | (Norway) Aksel Lund Svindal | (Austria) Matthias Mayer | (Austria) Georg Streitberger |
| 1558 | DH | 2014/15 | 29 November 2014 | (Norway) Kjetil Jansrud | (France) Guillermo Fayed (Canada) Manuel Osborne-Paradis | |
| 1559 | SG | 2014/15 | 30 November 2014 | (Norway) Kjetil Jansrud | (Austria) Matthias Mayer | (Italy) Dominik Paris |
| 1594 | DH | 2015/16 | 28 November 2015 | (Norway) Aksel Lund Svindal | (Italy) Peter Fill | (United States) Travis Ganong |
| 1595 | SG | 2015/16 | 29 November 2015 | (Norway) Aksel Lund Svindal | (Austria) Matthias Mayer | (Italy) Peter Fill |
| | DH | 2016/17 | 26 November 2016 | lack of snow on lower course; replaced in Kvitfjell on 24 February 2017 | | |
| | SG | 2016/17 | 27 November 2016 | lack of snow on lower course; replaced in Santa Caterina on 27 December 2016 | | |
| 1674 | DH | 2017/18 | 25 November 2017 | (Switzerland) Beat Feuz | (Austria) Matthias Mayer | (Norway) Aksel Lund Svindal |
| 1675 | SG | 2017/18 | 26 November 2017 | (Norway) Kjetil Jansrud | (Austria) Max Franz | (Austria) Hannes Reichelt |
| 1710 | DH | 2018/19 | 24 November 2018 | (Austria) Max Franz | (Italy) Christof Innerhofer | (Italy) Dominik Paris |
| 1711 | SG | 2018/19 | 25 November 2018 | (Norway) Kjetil Jansrud | (Austria) Vincent Kriechmayr | (Switzerland) Mauro Caviezel |
| 1749 | DH | 2019/20 | 30 November 2019 | (Germany) Thomas Dreßen | (Italy) Dominik Paris | (Switzerland) Beat Feuz (Switzerland) Carlo Janka |
| 1750 | SG | 2019/20 | 1 December 2019 | (Austria) Matthias Mayer | (Italy) Dominik Paris | (Switzerland) Mauro Caviezel (Austria) Vincent Kriechmayr |
| | DH | 2020/21 | 28 November 2020 | North American Tour cancelled before the season; due to the COVID-19 pandemic | | |
| | SG | 2020/21 | 29 November 2020 | North American Tour cancelled before the season; due to the COVID-19 pandemic | | |
| | DH | 2021/22 | 26 November 2021 | heavy snowfall; moved to Beaver Creek on 5 December 2021; cancelled again due to wind | | |
| 1820 | DH | 2021/22 | 27 November 2021 | (Austria) Matthias Mayer | (Austria) Vincent Kriechmayr | (Switzerland) Beat Feuz |
| | SG | 2021/22 | 28 November 2021 | heavy snowfall; moved to Bormio on 30 December 2021 | | |
| | DH | 2022/23 | 25 November 2022 | cancelled due to bad weather forecast; rescheduled to 26 November 2022. | | |
| | SG | 2022/23 | 26 November 2022 | cancelled due to program changes; switched and replaced with downhill | | |
| 1856 | DH | 2022/23 | 26 November 2022 | (Norway) Aleksander Aamodt Kilde | (Austria) Daniel Hemetsberger | (Switzerland) Marco Odermatt |
| 1857 | SG | 2022/23 | 27 November 2022 | (Switzerland) Marco Odermatt | (Norway) Aleksander Aamodt Kilde | (Austria) Matthias Mayer |

=== Women ===
| No. | Type | Season | Date | Winner | Second | Third |
|---|---|---|---|---|---|---|
| 604 | DH | 1988/89 | 18 February 1989 | (Switzerland) Michela Figini | (Switzerland) Maria Walliser | (West Germany) Michaela Gerg |
| 605 | DH | 1988/89 | 19 February 1989 | (Switzerland) Michela Figini | (Switzerland) Maria Walliser | (West Germany) Michaela Gerg |
| 666 | DH | 1990/91 | 9 March 1991 | (Austria) Sabine Ginther | (Switzerland) Chantal Bournissen | (Soviet Union) Svetlana Gladysheva |
| 667 | GS | 1990/91 | 10 March 1991 | (Sweden) Pernilla Wiberg | (Switzerland) Vreni Schneider | (Austria) Sylvia Eder |
| 668 | SL | 1990/91 | 11 March 1991 | (Switzerland) Vreni Schneider | (Sweden) Kristina Andersson | (Austria) Anita Wachter |
| 710 | DH | 1992/93 | 19 December 1992 | (Switzerland) Chantal Bournissen | (Germany) Katja Seizinger | (Germany) Michaela Gerg-Leitner |
| 711 | SG | 1992/93 | 20 December 1992 | (Germany) Katja Seizinger | (Russia) Tatiana Lebedeva | (Germany) Regina Häusl |
| 775 | DH | 1994/95 | 9 December 1994 | (United States) Picabo Street | (United States) Hilary Lindh | (Germany) Katja Seizinger |
| 776 | DH | 1994/95 | 10 December 1994 | (United States) Hilary Lindh | (France) Florence Masnada | (Switzerland) Heidi Zeller-Bähler |
| 777 | SG | 1994/95 | 11 December 1994 | (Germany) Katja Seizinger | (Switzerland) Heidi Zeller-Bähler | (United States) Picabo Street |
| | GS | 1995/96 | 25 November 1995 | heavy snowfall; rescheduled on Sunday and cancelled; replaced in Maribor | | |
| | SL | 1995/96 | 26 November 1995 | heavy snowfall; rescheduled on Monday and cancelled | | |
| | DH | 1995/96 | 2 December 1995 | cancelled after 29 athletes for heavy snowfall; replaced on the next day | | |
| | SG | 1995/96 | 2 December 1995 | cancelled due to switched schedule; DH had advantage compared to SG | | |
| 804 | DH | 1995/96 | 3 December 1995 | (United States) Picabo Street | (Germany) Katja Seizinger | (Russia) Varvara Zelenskaya |
| 839 | DH | 1996/97 | 30 November 1996 | (Germany) Katja Seizinger | (France) Carole Montillet | (Sweden) Pernilla Wiberg |
| 840 | SG | 1996/97 | 1 December 1996 | (Sweden) Pernilla Wiberg | (Germany) Hilde Gerg | (Russia) Varvara Zelenskaya |
| 874 | DH | 1997/98 | 4 December 1997 | (Germany) Katja Seizinger | (Germany) Katharina Gutensohn | (Austria) Renate Götschl |
| 875 | DH | 1997/98 | 5 December 1997 | (Germany) Katja Seizinger | (France) Mélanie Suchet | (Italy) Isolde Kostner |
| 876 | SG | 1997/98 | 6 December 1997 | (Germany) Katja Seizinger | (Germany) Hilde Gerg | (Italy) Isolde Kostner |
| 904 | DH | 1998/99 | 27 November 1998 | (Austria) Renate Götschl | (Italy) Isolde Kostner | (Switzerland) Corinne Rey-Bellet |
| 905 | DH | 1998/99 | 28 November 1998 | (Austria) Renate Götschl | (Italy) Isolde Kostner | (Germany) Regina Häusl |
| 906 | SG | 1998/99 | 29 November 1998 | (Austria) Alexandra Meissnitzer | (Sweden) Pernilla Wiberg | (Germany) Hilde Gerg |
| 940 | DH | 1999/00 | 27 November 1999 | (Italy) Isolde Kostner | (Germany) Hilde Gerg | (Switzerland) Corinne Rey-Bellet |
| 941 | SG | 1999/00 | 28 November 1999 | (Slovenia) Mojca Suhadolc | (Germany) Hilde Gerg | (Italy) Isolde Kostner |
| 982 | DH | 2000/01 | 30 November 2000 | (Germany) Petra Haltmayr | (Italy) Isolde Kostner | (Austria) Renate Götschl |
| 983 | DH | 2000/01 | 1 December 2000 | (Italy) Isolde Kostner | (France) Carole Montillet | (Switzerland) Corinne Rey-Bellet |
| 984 | SG | 2000/01 | 2 December 2000 | (Austria) Renate Götschl | (France) Régine Cavagnoud | (Germany) Martina Ertl |
| 1014 | DH | 2001/02 | 29 November 2001 | (Italy) Isolde Kostner | (Austria) Michaela Dorfmeister | (Switzerland) Corinne Rey-Bellet |
| 1015 | DH | 2001/02 | 30 November 2001 | (Italy) Isolde Kostner | (Switzerland) Sylviane Berthod | (Austria) Michaela Dorfmeister |
| 1016 | SG | 2001/02 | 1 December 2001 | (Germany) Petra Haltmayr | (France) Carole Montillet | (United States) Caroline Lalive |
| 1050 | DH | 2002/03 | 6 December 2002 | (Germany) Hilde Gerg | (France) Carole Montillet | (United States) Kirsten Clark |
| 1051 | DH | 2002/03 | 7 December 2002 | (France) Carole Montillet | (Switzerland) Corinne Rey-Bellet | (Austria) Renate Götschl |
| 1052 | SG | 2002/03 | 8 December 2002 | (Italy) Karen Putzer | (Germany) Martina Ertl | (France) Carole Montillet |
| 1081 | DH | 2003/04 | 5 December 2003 | (France) Carole Montillet | (Germany) Hilde Gerg | (United States) Kirsten Clark |
| 1082 | DH | 2003/04 | 6 December 2003 | (France) Carole Montillet | (Austria) Michaela Dorfmeister | (Austria) Renate Götschl |
| 1083 | SG | 2003/04 | 7 December 2003 | (Austria) Renate Götschl | (Austria) Michaela Dorfmeister | (Germany) Hilde Gerg |
| 1117 | DH | 2004/05 | 3 December 2004 | (United States) Lindsey Vonn | (France) Carole Montillet | (Germany) Hilde Gerg |
| 1118 | DH | 2004/05 | 4 December 2004 | (Germany) Hilde Gerg | (Austria) Renate Götschl | (France) Carole Montillet |
| 1119 | SG | 2004/05 | 5 December 2004 | (Austria) Michaela Dorfmeister | (Austria) Renate Götschl | (United States) Lindsey Vonn |
| 1147 | DH | 2005/06 | 2 December 2005 | (Italy) Elena Fanchini | (Austria) Michaela Dorfmeister | (Austria) Alexandra Meissnitzer |
| 1148 | DH | 2005/06 | 3 December 2005 | (United States) Lindsey Vonn | (Switzerland) Sylviane Berthod | (Austria) Michaela Dorfmeister |
| 1149 | SG | 2005/06 | 4 December 2005 | (Austria) Alexandra Meissnitzer | (Austria) Andrea Fischbacher | (Austria) Michaela Dorfmeister |
| 1185 | DH | 2006/07 | 1 December 2006 | (Germany) Maria Riesch | (United States) Lindsey Vonn | (Italy) Nadia Fanchini |
| 1186 | DH | 2006/07 | 2 December 2006 | (United States) Lindsey Vonn | (Austria) Renate Götschl | (Sweden) Anja Pärson |
| 1187 | SG | 2006/07 | 3 December 2006 | (Austria) Renate Götschl | (United States) Lindsey Vonn | (Canada) Kelly VanderBeek |
| 1221 | DH | 2007/08 | 1 December 2007 | (United States) Lindsey Vonn | (Austria) Renate Götschl | (Canada) Britt Janyk |
| 1222 | SG | 2007/08 | 2 December 2007 | (Switzerland) Martina Schild | (Germany) Maria Riesch | (Sweden) Jessica Lindell-Vikarby |
| 1256 | DH | 2008/09 | 5 December 2008 | (United States) Lindsey Vonn | (Italy) Nadia Fanchini | (Germany) Maria Riesch |
| | DH | 2008/09 | 6 December 2008 | cancelled | | |
| 1257 | SG | 2008/09 | 7 December 2008 | (Italy) Nadia Fanchini | (Austria) Andrea Fischbacher (Switzerland) Fabienne Suter | |
| 1290 | DH | 2009/10 | 4 December 2009 | (United States) Lindsey Vonn | (Canada) Emily Brydon | (Germany) Maria Riesch |
| 1291 | DH | 2009/10 | 5 December 2009 | (United States) Lindsey Vonn | (Germany) Maria Riesch | (Canada) Emily Brydon |
| 1292 | SG | 2009/10 | 6 December 2009 | (Austria) Elisabeth Görgl | (United States) Lindsey Vonn | (France) Ingrid Jacquemod |
| 1322 | DH | 2010/11 | 3 December 2010 | (Germany) Maria Riesch | (United States) Lindsey Vonn | (Austria) Elisabeth Görgl |
| 1323 | DH | 2010/11 | 4 December 2010 | (Germany) Maria Riesch | (United States) Lindsey Vonn | (Switzerland) Dominique Gisin |
| 1324 | SG | 2010/11 | 5 December 2010 | (United States) Lindsey Vonn | (Germany) Maria Riesch | (United States) Julia Mancuso |
| 1354 | DH | 2011/12 | 2 December 2011 | (United States) Lindsey Vonn | (Liechtenstein) Tina Weirather | (Switzerland) Dominique Gisin |
| 1355 | DH | 2011/12 | 3 December 2011 | (United States) Lindsey Vonn | (France) Marie Marchand-Arvier | (Austria) Elisabeth Görgl |
| 1356 | SG | 2011/12 | 4 December 2011 | (United States) Lindsey Vonn | (Austria) Anna Fenninger | (United States) Julia Mancuso |
| 1392 | DH | 2012/13 | 30 November 2012 | (United States) Lindsey Vonn | (United States) Stacey Cook | (Germany) Maria Riesch (Liechtenstein) Tina Weirather |
| 1393 | DH | 2012/13 | 1 December 2012 | (United States) Lindsey Vonn | (United States) Stacey Cook | (Switzerland) Marianne Abderhalden |
| 1393 | SG | 2012/13 | 2 December 2012 | (United States) Lindsey Vonn | (United States) Julia Mancuso | (Austria) Anna Fenninger |
| 1428 | DH | 2013/14 | 6 December 2013 | (Germany) Maria Riesch | (Switzerland) Marianne Abderhalden | (Italy) Elena Fanchini |
| 1429 | DH | 2013/14 | 7 December 2013 | (Germany) Maria Riesch | (Liechtenstein) Tina Weirather | (Austria) Anna Fenninger |
| 1430 | SG | 2013/14 | 8 December 2013 | (Switzerland) Lara Gut | (Liechtenstein) Tina Weirather | (Austria) Anna Fenninger |
| 1459 | DH | 2014/15 | 5 December 2014 | (Slovenia) Tina Maze | (Austria) Anna Fenninger | (Liechtenstein) Tina Weirather |
| 1460 | DH | 2014/15 | 6 December 2014 | (United States) Lindsey Vonn | (United States) Stacey Cook | (United States) Julia Mancuso |
| 1461 | SG | 2014/15 | 7 December 2014 | (Switzerland) Lara Gut | (United States) Lindsey Vonn | (Slovenia) Tina Maze |
| 1491 | DH | 2015/16 | 4 December 2015 | (United States) Lindsey Vonn | (Austria) Cornelia Hütter | (Austria) Ramona Siebenhofer |
| 1492 | DH | 2015/16 | 5 December 2015 | (United States) Lindsey Vonn | (Switzerland) Fabienne Suter | (Austria) Cornelia Hütter |
| 1493 | SG | 2015/16 | 6 December 2015 | (United States) Lindsey Vonn | (Austria) Tamara Tippler | (Austria) Cornelia Hütter |
| 1531 | DH | 2016/17 | 2 December 2016 | (Slovenia) Ilka Štuhec | (Italy) Sofia Goggia | (Sweden) Kajsa Kling |
| 1532 | DH | 2016/17 | 3 December 2016 | (Slovenia) Ilka Štuhec | (Switzerland) Lara Gut | (Hungary) Edit Miklós |
| 1533 | SG | 2016/17 | 4 December 2016 | (Switzerland) Lara Gut | (Liechtenstein) Tina Weirather | (Italy) Sofia Goggia |
| 1568 | DH | 2017/18 | 1 December 2017 | (Austria) Cornelia Hütter | (Liechtenstein) Tina Weirather | (United States) Mikaela Shiffrin |
| 1569 | DH | 2017/18 | 2 December 2017 | (United States) Mikaela Shiffrin | (Germany) Viktoria Rebensburg | (Switzerland) Michelle Gisin |
| 1570 | SG | 2017/18 | 3 December 2017 | (Liechtenstein) Tina Weirather | (Switzerland) Lara Gut | (Austria) Nicole Schmidhofer |
| 1606 | DH | 2018/19 | 30 November 2018 | (Austria) Nicole Schmidhofer | (Switzerland) Michelle Gisin | (Germany) Kira Weidle |
| 1607 | DH | 2018/19 | 1 December 2018 | (Austria) Nicole Schmidhofer | (Austria) Cornelia Hütter | (Switzerland) Michelle Gisin |
| 1608 | SG | 2018/19 | 2 December 2018 | (United States) Mikaela Shiffrin | (Norway) Ragnhild Mowinckel | (Germany) Viktoria Rebensburg |
| 1641 | DH | 2019/20 | 6 December 2019 | (Czech Republic) Ester Ledecká | (Switzerland) Corinne Suter | (Austria) Stephanie Venier |
| 1642 | DH | 2019/20 | 7 December 2019 | (Austria) Nicole Schmidhofer | (United States) Mikaela Shiffrin | (Italy) Francesca Marsaglia |
| 1643 | SG | 2019/20 | 8 December 2019 | (Germany) Viktoria Rebensburg | (Italy) Nicol Delago | (Switzerland) Corinne Suter |
| | DH | 2020/21 | 4 December 2020 | North American Tour cancelled before the season; due to the COVID-19 pandemic | | |
| | DH | 2020/21 | 5 December 2020 | North American Tour cancelled before the season; due to the COVID-19 pandemic | | |
| | SG | 2020/21 | 6 December 2020 | North American Tour cancelled before the season; due to the COVID-19 pandemic | | |
| 1704 | DH | 2021/22 | 3 December 2021 | (Italy) Sofia Goggia | (United States) Breezy Johnson | (Austria) Mirjam Puchner |
| 1705 | DH | 2021/22 | 4 December 2021 | (Italy) Sofia Goggia | (United States) Breezy Johnson | (Switzerland) Corinne Suter |
| 1706 | SG | 2021/22 | 5 December 2021 | (Italy) Sofia Goggia | (Switzerland) Lara Gut-Behrami | (Austria) Mirjam Puchner |
| 1739 | DH | 2022/23 | 2 December 2022 | (Italy) Sofia Goggia | (Switzerland) Corinne Suter | (Austria) Cornelia Huetter |
| 1740 | DH | 2022/23 | 3 December 2022 | (Italy) Sofia Goggia | (Austria) Nina Ortlieb | (Switzerland) Corinne Suter |
| 1741 | SG | 2022/23 | 4 December 2022 | (Switzerland) Corinne Suter | (Austria) Cornelia Hütter | (Norway) Ragnhild Mowinckel |

== Club5+ ==
In 1986, elite Club5 was originally founded by prestigious classic downhill organizers: Kitzbühel, Wengen, Garmisch, Val d’Isère and Val Gardena/Gröden, with goal to bring alpine ski sport on the highest levels possible.

Later over the years other classic longterm organizers joined the now named Club5+: Alta Badia, Cortina, Kranjska Gora, Maribor, Lake Louise, Schladming, Adelboden, Kvitfjell, St.Moritz and Åre.
