= Switzerland at the FIS Alpine World Ski Championships 2021 =

Swiss team at the 2021 Alpine World Ski Championships

Switzerland at the 2021 FIS Alpine World Ski Championships
- IOC code: SUI
- National federation: Swiss-Ski
- Website: www.swiss-ski.ch

in (Italy) Cortina d'Ampezzo
- Competitors: 23 (14 men, 9 women)
- Medals Ranked 2nd: Gold 3 Silver 1 Bronze 5 Total 9

FIS Alpine World Ski Championships appearances
- 1931; 1932; 1933; 1934; 1935; 1936; 1937; 1938; 1939; 1948; 1950; 1952; 1954; 1956; 1958; 1960; 1962; 1964; 1966; 1968; 1970; 1972; 1974; 1976; 1978; 1980; 1982; 1985; 1987; 1989; 1991; 1993; 1996; 1997; 1999; 2001; 2003; 2005; 2007; 2009; 2011; 2013; 2015; 2017; 2019; 2021

Switzerland competed at the FIS Alpine World Ski Championships 2021 in Cortina d'Ampezzo, Italy, from 8 to 21 February 2021.

== Medalists ==
Swiss medallists
| Athlete | Gender | Event | Medal |
|---|---|---|---|
| Corinne Suter | Women | Downhill | GOLD |
| Lara Gut-Behrami | Women | Super-G | GOLD |
| Lara Gut-Behrami | Women | Giant slalom | GOLD |
| Corinne Suter | Women | Super-G | SILVER |
| Lara Gut-Behrami | Women | Downhill | BRONZE |
| Michelle Gisin | Women | Alpine combined | BRONZE |
| Beat Feuz | Men | Downhill | BRONZE |
| Loïc Meillard | Men | Alpine combined | BRONZE |
| Loïc Meillard | Men | Parallel giant slalom | BRONZE |

== Results ==
Numbers are final placings. DNF (1 or 2 denotes the run not finished); DNQ; QF.

=== Men ===
Men's results
| Skier | Slalom | Giant slalom | Super-G | Downhill | Combined | Parallel | Team event |
|---|---|---|---|---|---|---|---|
| Beat Feuz | | | 10 | 3 | | | |
| Marco Odermatt | | DNF | 11 | 4 | | 11 | |
| Carlo Janka | | | | 9 | | | |
| Niels Hintermann | | | | DNF | | | |
| Loïc Meillard | DNF1 | 5 | DNF | | 3 | 3 | |
| Mauro Caviezel | | | DNF | | | | |
| Daniel Yule | 5 | | | | | | |
| Ramon Zenhäusern | 11 | | | | | | |
| Luca Aerni | DNF1 | | | | DNF2 | | |
| Justin Murisier | | DNF | | | 8 | DNQ | |
| Gino Caviezel | | DNF | | | DNF2 | DNF | |
| Sandro Simonet | | | | | | | 4 |
| Semyel Bissig | | | | | | | 4 |

=== Women ===
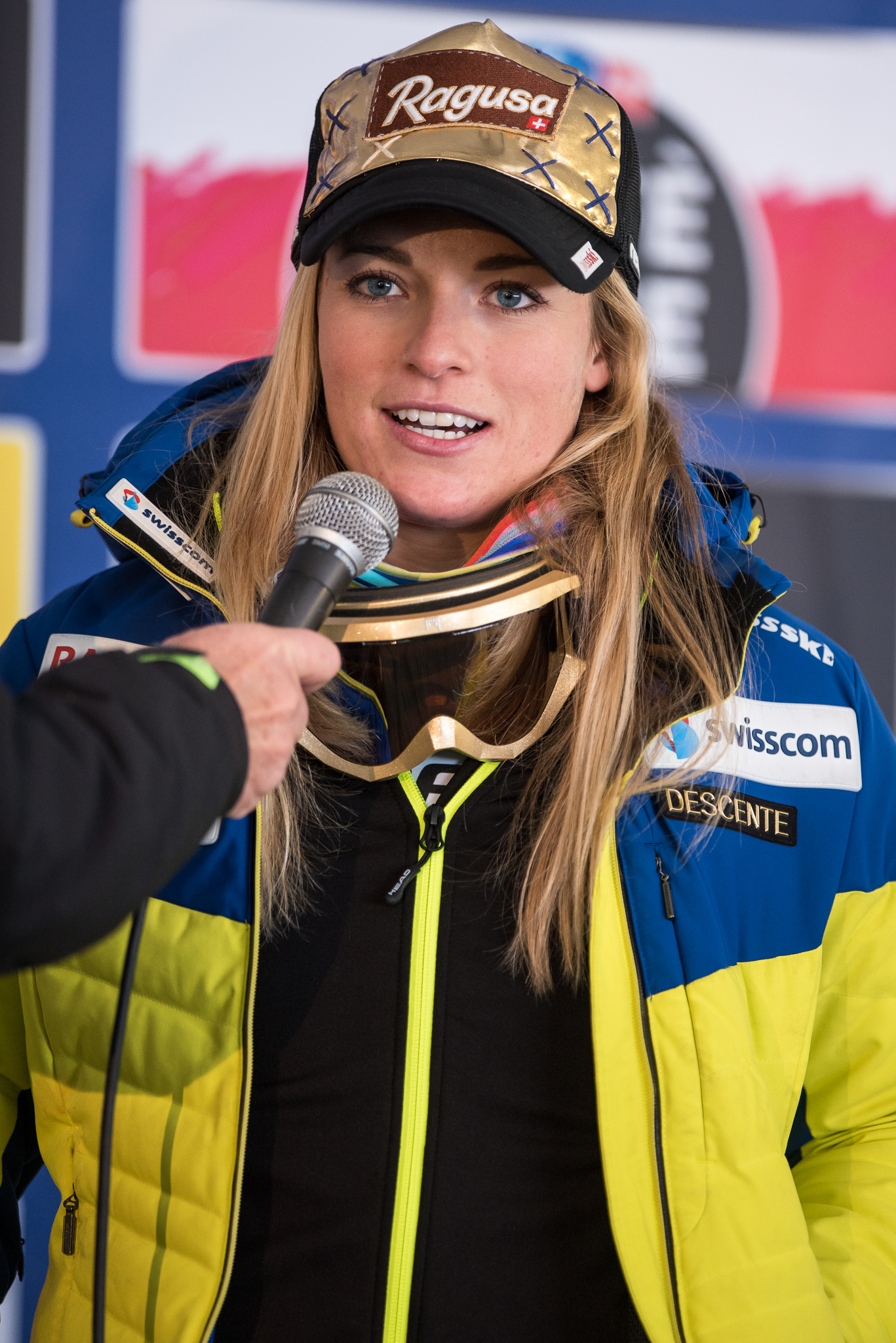
Lara Gut-Behrami three medals (two gold) at Cortina 2021.

Women's results
| Skier | Slalom | Giant slalom | Super-G | Downhill | Combined | Parallel | Team event |
|---|---|---|---|---|---|---|---|
| Wendy Holdener | 4 | 8 | | | DNF2 | QF | 4 |
| Camille Rast | 8 | | | | | 25 | 4 |
| Mélanie Meillard | 19 | | | | | | |
| Michelle Gisin | DNF1 | 11 | 8 | 5 | 3 | | |
| Lara Gut-Behrami | | 1 | 1 | 3 | | 20 | |
| Corinne Suter | | 18 | 2 | 1 | | | |
| Priska Nufer | | | 13 | | DNF2 | | |
| Jasmina Suter | | | | 18 | DNF2 | 32 | |

== See also ==
- Switzerland national alpine ski team
