= Swiss Sports Personality of the Year =

Journalism sports award in Switzerland

The Swiss Sports Personality of the Year was originally chosen annually from 1950 by the Swiss newspaper Sport. As the newspaper was discontinued in the 1990s, the winners are now chosen by Swiss journalists and TV viewers. Both groups' votes are equally weighted in determining the final result. In 2009 Roger Federer had a large lead among voters working in the media, but viewers voted for Didier Cuche, giving him the award. Even Cuche was surprised and in his speech he apologized to Federer, saying "I hope he's not too angry." In 2005 spectators voted for Thomas Lüthi while the media instead voted for Federer.

Roger Federer has won this award a record seven times (2003, 2004, 2006, 2007, 2012, 2014, and 2017).

== List of winners ==
YEAR	MEN'S OR WOMEN'S WINNER	SPORT
1950	Armin Scheurer	track and field
1951	Hugo Koblet	road cycling
1952	Josef Stalder	gymnastics
1953	Alfred Bickel	football (soccer)
1954	Ida Bieri-Schöpfer	alpine skiing
1955	Hans Frischknecht	track and field
1956	Madeleine Chamot-Berthod	alpine skiing
1957	Walter Tschudi	track and field
1958	Christian Wägli	track and field
1959	Ernst Fivian	gymnastics
1960	Bruno Galliker	track and field
1961	Gérard Barras	track and field
1962	Adolf Mathis	alpine skiing
1963	August Hollenstein	shooting
1964	Henri Chammartin	equestrian (dressage)
1965	Urs von Wartburg	track and field
1966	Meta Antenen	track and field
1967	Werner Duttweiler	track and field
1968	Josef Haas	Nordic skiing
1969	Philippe Clerc	track and field
1970	Bernhard Russi	alpine skiing
1971	Meta Antenen	track and field
YEAR	MEN'S AND WOMEN'S WINNER	SPORT
1972	Bernhard Russi	alpine skiing
1972	Marie-Theres Nadig	alpine skiing
1973	Werner Dössegger	track and field
1973	Karin Iten	figure skating
1974	Clay Regazzoni	auto racing
1974	Lise-Marie Morerod	alpine skiing
1975	Rolf Bernhard	track and field
1975	Lise-Marie Morerod	alpine skiing
1976	Heini Hemmi	alpine skiing
1976	Christine Stückelberger	equestrian (dressage)
1977	Michel Broillet	weightlifting
1977	Lise-Marie Morerod	alpine skiing
1978	Markus Ryffel	track and field
1978	Cornelia Bürki	track and field
1979	Peter Lüscher	alpine skiing
1979	Denise Biellmann	figure skating
1980	Robert Dill-Bundi	road cycling
1980	Ruth Keller	gymnastics
1981	Roland Dalhäuser	track and field
1981	Denise Biellmann	figure skating
1982	Urs Freuler	road cycling
1982	Erika Hess	alpine skiing
1983	Urs Freuler	road cycling
1983	Doris de Agostini	alpine skiing
1984	Étienne Dagon	swimming
1984	Michela Figini	alpine skiing
1985	Pirmin Zurbriggen	alpine skiing
1985	Michela Figini	alpine skiing
1986	Werner Günthör	track and field
1986	Maria Walliser	alpine skiing
1987	Werner Günthör	track and field
1987	Maria Walliser	alpine skiing
1988	Hippolyt Kempf	Nordic skiing
1988	Vreni Schneider	alpine skiing
1989	Tony Rominger	road cycling
1989	Vreni Schneider	alpine skiing
1990	Daniel Giubellini	gymnastics
1990	Anita Protti	track and field
1991	Werner Günthör	track and field
1991	Vreni Schneider	alpine skiing
1992	Tony Rominger	road cycling
1992	Conny Kissling	freestyle skiing
1993	Tony Rominger	road cycling
1993	Manuela Maleeva	tennis
1994	Tony Rominger	road cycling
1994	Vreni Schneider	alpine skiing
1995	Donghua Li	gymnastics
1995	Vreni Schneider	alpine skiing
1996	Donghua Li	gymnastics
1996	Barbara Heeb	road cycling
1997	Michael von Grünigen	alpine skiing
1997	Martina Hingis	tennis
1998	Oscar Camenzind	road cycling
1998	Natascha Badmann	triathlon
1999	Marcel Schelbert	track and field
1999	Anita Weyermann	track and field
2000	André Bucher	track and field
2000	Brigitte McMahon	triathlon
2001	André Bucher	track and field
2001	Sonja Nef	alpine skiing
2002	Simon Ammann	ski jumping
2002	Natascha Badmann	triathlon
2003	Roger Federer	tennis
2003	Simone Niggli-Luder	orienteering
2004	Roger Federer	tennis
2004	Karin Thürig	road cycling
2005	Thomas Lüthi	motorcycle racing
2005	Simone Niggli-Luder	orienteering
2006	Roger Federer	tennis
2006	Tanja Frieden	snowboarding
2007	Roger Federer	tennis
2007	Simone Niggli-Luder	orienteering
2008	Fabian Cancellara	road cycling
2008	Ariella Kaeslin	gymnastics
2009	Didier Cuche	alpine skiing
2009	Ariella Kaeslin	gymnastics
2010	Simon Ammann	ski jumping
2010	Ariella Kaeslin	gymnastics
2011	Didier Cuche	alpine skiing
2011	Sarah Meier	figure skating
2012	Roger Federer	tennis
2012	Nicola Spirig	triathlon
2013	Dario Cologna	cross-country skiing
2013	Giulia Steingruber	gymnastics
2014	Roger Federer	tennis
2014	Dominique Gisin	alpine skiing
2015	Stan Wawrinka	tennis
2015	Daniela Ryf	triathlon
2016	Fabian Cancellara	road cycling
2016	Lara Gut	alpine skiing
2017	Roger Federer	tennis
2017	Wendy Holdener	alpine skiing
2018	Nino Schurter	cross-country cycling
2018	Daniela Ryf	triathlon
2019	Christian Stucki	schwingen
2019	Mujinga Kambundji	track and field
2020	Not awarded due to the COVID-19 pandemic.
2021	Marco Odermatt	alpine skiing
2021	Belinda Bencic	tennis
2022	Marco Odermatt	alpine skiing
2022	Mujinga Kambundji	track and field
2023	Marco Odermatt	alpine skiing
2023	Lara Gut-Behrami	alpine skiing
2024	Marco Odermatt	alpine skiing
2024	Lara Gut-Behrami	alpine skiing
