= Switzerland national alpine ski team =

Team representing Switzerland in skiing

Switzerland
- National federation: Swiss Ski
- Coach: Thomas Stauffer (men); Beat Tschuor (women)

Olympic Games
- Appearances: 24
- Medals: 75

World Championships
- Appearances: 46
- Medals: 204
Medal record
Alpine skiing
Event	1st	2nd	3rd
Winter Olympics	27	23	25
World Championships	69	70	65
Total	96	93	90

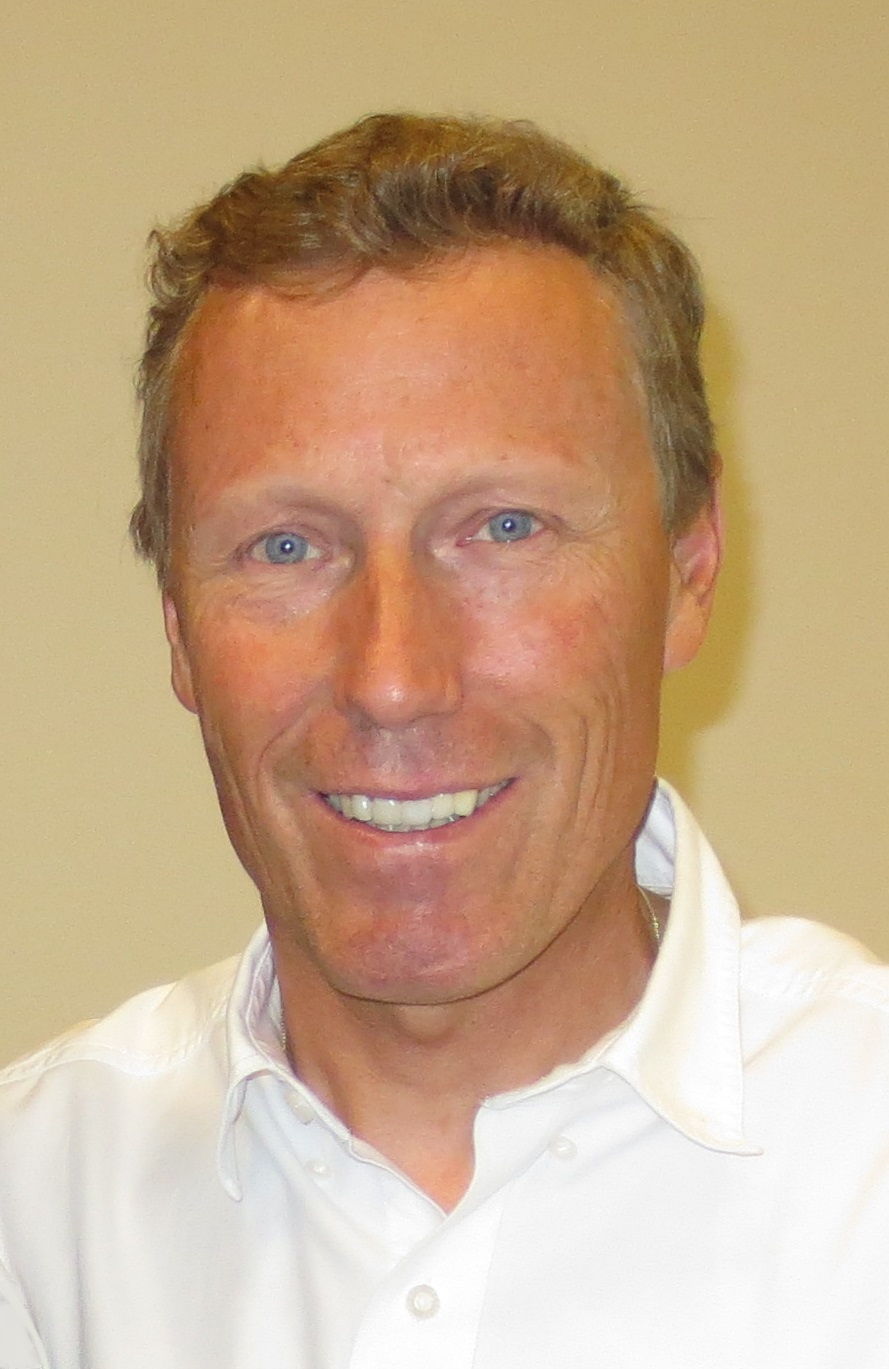
Pirmin Zurbriggen four overall World Cup and 5 medals between Olympics and World Championships.

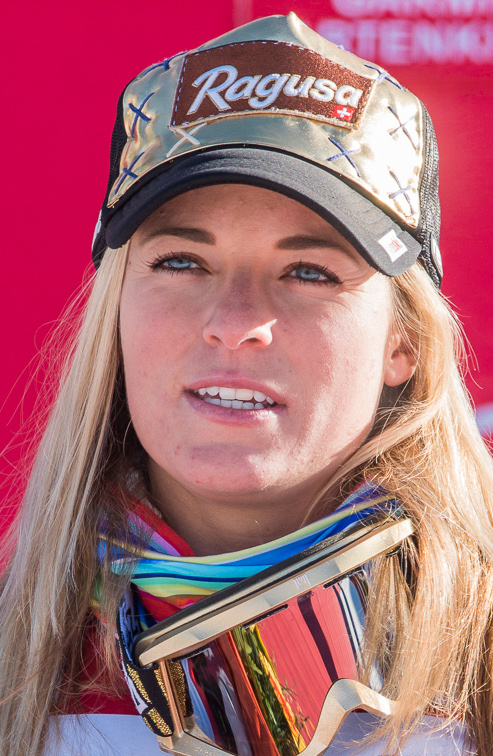
Lara Gut 48 victories in World Cup.

The Switzerland national alpine ski team represents Switzerland in International alpine skiing competitions such as Winter Olympic Games, FIS Alpine Ski World Cup and FIS Alpine World Ski Championships.

== World Cup ==
Swiss alpine skiers won 24 overall FIS Alpine Ski World Cup, 11 with men and 13 with women and won 699 races.

Update to the end of 2021-22 season

Still active

=== Titles ===
==== Men ====
Skier	Overall	DH	SG	GS	SL	KB	PS	Tot.
Pirmin Zurbriggen	4	2	4	3	-	-	-	13
Marco Odermatt	4	2	3	4	-	-	-	13
Didier Cuche	-	4	1	1	-	-	-	6
Beat Feuz	-	4	-	-	-	-	-	4
Michael von Grünigen	-	-	-	4	-	-	-	4
Franz Heinzer	-	3	1	-	-	-	-	4
Carlo Janka	1	-	-	-	-	1	-	2
Paul Accola	1	-	1	-	-	-	-	2
Peter Müller	-	2	-	-	-	-	-	2
Roland Collombin	-	2	-	-	-	-	-	2
Bernhard Russi	-	2	-	-	-	-	-	2
Peter Lüscher	1	-	-	-	-	-	-	1
Mauro Caviezel	-	-	1	-	-	-	-	1
Loïc Meillard	-	-	-	-	-	-	1	1
Joël Gaspoz	-	-	-	1	-	-	-	1
Urs Räber	-	1	-	-	-	-	-	1
Heini Hemmi	-	-	-	1	-	-	-	1
Dumeng Giovanoli	-	-	-	-	1	-	-	1
Total	8	20	8	11	1	1	1	50

==== Women ====
Skier	Overall	DH	SG	GS	SL	KB	PS	Tot.
Vreni Schneider	3	-	-	5	6	-	-	14
Lara Gut	2	-	6	1	-	-	-	9
Michela Figini	2	4	1	-	-	-	-	7
Erika Hess	2	-	-	1	4	-	-	7
Maria Walliser	2	2	1	1	-	-	-	6
Lise-Marie Morerod	1	-	-	3	2	-	-	6
Marie-Thérèse Nadig	1	2	-	-	-	-	-	3
Corinne Suter	-	1	1	-	-	-	-	2
Wendy Holdener	-	-	-	-	-	2	-	2
Sonja Nef	-	-	-	2	-	-	-	2
Chantal Bournissen	-	1	-	-	-	-	-	1
Corinne Schmidhauser	-	-	-	-	1	-	-	1
Doris De Agostini	-	1	-	-	-	-	-	1
Total	12	11	6	12	13	2	0	56

=== Wins ===
==== Men ====
#	Skier	Wins	DH	SG	GS	SL	KB	PS	Podiums
1	Marco Odermatt	49	5	16	28	-	-	-	93
2	Pirmin Zurbriggen	40	10	10	7	2	11	1	83
3	Peter Müller	24	19	2	-	-	3	-	51
4	Michael von Grünigen	23	-	-	23	-	-	-	48
5	Didier Cuche	21	12	6	3	-	-	-	67
6	Franz Heinzer	17	15	-	-	-	2	-	45
7	Beat Feuz	16	13	3	-	-	-	-	59
8	Carlo Janka	11	3	1	4	-	3	-	28
9	Bernhard Russi	10	9	-	1	-	-	-	28
10	Roland Collombin	8	-	-	-	-	-	-	11
10	Daniel Mahrer	8	7	1	-	-	-	-	24
10	Loïc Meillard	8	-	-	5	2	-	1	30
13	Paul Accola	7	-	2	1	1	3	-	26
13	Joël Gaspoz	7	-	-	6	1	-	-	19
15	Peter Lüscher	6	1	1	-	1	3	-	25
16	Karl Alpiger	5	5	-	-	-	-	-	11
16	Edmund Bruggmann	5	-	-	4	1	-	-	14
16	Didier Défago	5	3	2	-	-	-	-	16
16	Dumeng Giovanoli	5	-	-	3	2	-	-	17

==== Women ====
#	Skier	Wins	DH	SG	GS	SL	KB	PS	Podiums
1	Vreni Schneider	55	-	-	20	34	1	1	101
2	Lara Gut	48	13	24	10	-	1	-	101
3	Erika Hess	31	-	-	6	21	4	-	76
4	Michela Figini	26	17	3	2	-	4	-	46
5	Maria Walliser	25	14	3	6	-	2	-	72
6	Lise-Marie Morerod	24	-	-	14	10	-	-	41
6	Marie-Thérèse Nadig	24	16	-	6	-	5	-	57
8	Sonja Nef	15	-	-	13	2	-	-	32
9	Brigitte Oertli	9	1	-	-	1	7	1	31
10	Doris De Agostini	8	8	-	-	-	-	-	19
11	Chantal Bournissen	7	6	1	-	-	-	1	14
11	Bernadette Zurbriggen	7	5	-	1	-	1	1	18
13	Corinne Rey-Bellet	5	3	2	-	-	-	-	15
13	Corinne Suter	5	3	2	-	-	-	-	26
13	Wendy Holdener	5	-	-	-	2	2	1	52
16	Corinne Schmidhauser	4	-	-	-	4	-	-	8
16	Nadia Styger	4	1	3	-	-	-	-	6
16	Fabienne Suter	4	1	3	-	-	-	-	20

== See also ==
- Switzerland at the Olympics
