= Willi Forrer =

Swiss alpine skier (1935–2026)

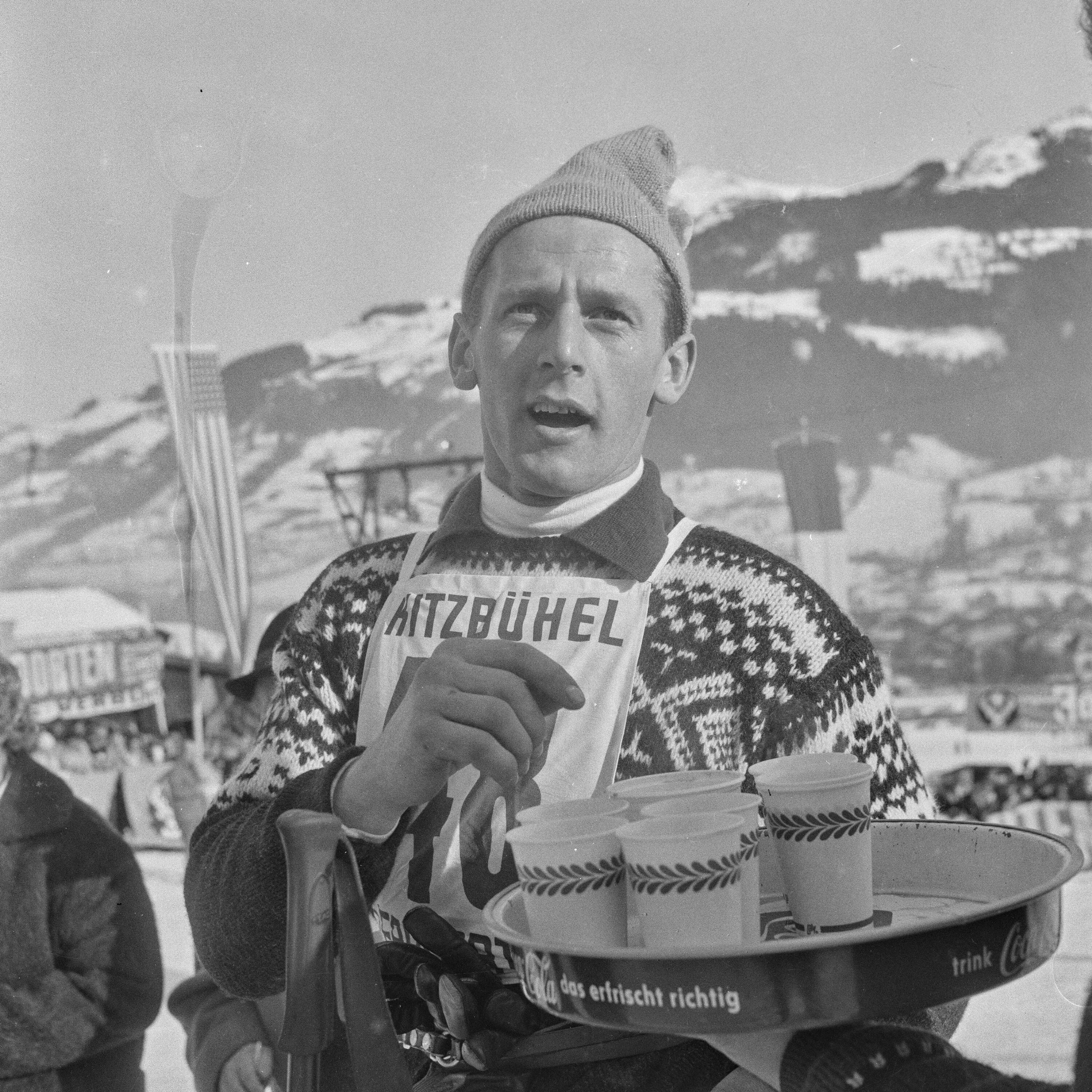
- Forrer at the 1962 Hahnenkamm Races

Personal information
- Nationality: Swiss
- Born: 3 July 1935 Wildhaus, Switzerland
- Died: 24 March 2026 (aged 90) Davos, Switzerland

Sport
- Sport: Alpine skiing

Willi Forrer (3 July 1935 – 24 March 2026) was a Swiss alpine skier. He competed in three events at the 1960 Winter Olympics.

== Life ==
Forrer grew up as the middle child of seven siblings on a farm in Wildhaus-Oberdorf. His father worked as a farmer, a piecework logger, a ski instructor, and a mountain guide, while his mother was a farmer and an embroiderer of traditional costumes. He learned to ski on a hill behind his family home in the Toggenburg region. During his competitive career, Forrer worked from April to November as a trained ski maker in a ski factory.

In the late 1950s and early 1960s, Forrer was one of the world's best ski racers, particularly in the downhill event. Between 1957 and 1962, he competed annually in the Hahnenkamm Races in Kitzbühel, and he took part in the Lauberhorn Races in Wengen seven times. In February 1958, he participated in the World Championships in Bad Gastein, where he finished fourth in the downhill — behind Toni Sailer, Roger Staub, and Jean Vuarnet — narrowly missing the bronze medal by 0.4 seconds.

In 1959, he won the first of four Swiss championship titles in his signature event. At the Olympic Games in Squaw Valley, Forrer once again finished fourth in the downhill. Two years later, he achieved his greatest success by winning the Hahnenkamm downhill, becoming the third Swiss skier to do so. His run of bad luck continued at the 1962 World Championships in Chamonix, where he finished fourth in the downhill at a major event for the third consecutive time; he placed eleventh in the giant slalom. Following public criticism of the Swiss Ski Association's leadership — with the newspaper Blick running the headline "Something is rotten in Swiss sport" — Forrer was banned by the association for two years and subsequently wound down his racing career in Canada.

Forrer declined an offer to work as a coach for the Canadian association because his young wife did not want to emigrate. Since childhood, Forrer had worked as a painter of traditional folk art, incorporating motifs from the Toggenburg and Appenzell regions into his work. After living in British Columbia with his second wife, Johanna, from 1990 to 2008, the couple returned to Klosters, Johanna’s hometown.

Forrer died in March 2026 at the age of 90 and was buried at the Davos Forest Cemetery.
