= Markus Vogel =

Swiss alpine skier (born 1984)

Personal information
- Born: January 12, 1984 (age 42) Stans, Switzerland
- Height: 1.84 m (6 ft 0 in)
- Website: markusvogel.ch

Skiing career
- Sport: Alpine skiing
- Club: Beckenried Klewenalp
- Disciplines: Slalom
- World Cup debut: January 6, 2008 (age 23)

Olympics
- Teams: 0

World Championships
- Teams: 2 - '11, '13
- Medals: 0

World Cup
- Seasons: 6th - (2008-13)
- Wins: 0 -
- Podiums: 0 -
- Overall titles: 0 - (78th in 2011)
- Discipline titles: 0 - (25th in SL, 2011)

Markus Vogel (born January 12, 1984) is a World Cup alpine ski racer from the Canton of Nidwalden in Switzerland, who specializes in the Slalom discipline. He made his World Cup debut in January 2008 in his home race at Adelboden where he skied out of the first run. A week later in the slalom in Wengen, Vogel managed to qualify for the second run in 29th place from a start number of 62, but was unable to finish the second run. He did not finish the first run of his other four races in 2008. In fact, it was over a year until Vogel picked up his first World Cup points with a 19th-place finish in Kitzbühel. The 2010 season was another disappointing one, with Vogel spending most of his time in FIS Races and European Cup level. After this period, Vogel came back strongly at the end of the next season and earned himself a place in the Swiss World Championship team in 2011. In 2012, he was Switzerland's top slalom skier with the injury to Marc Gini. Vogel was also selected to the World Championship team in 2013, where he finished 17th in the Slalom.

Vogel's World Cup the best 6th place came in the night slalom race at Madonna di Campiglio in 2013. He was also an important part of the Swiss team that finished runners-up in the Team Event at the World Cup finals at Schladming in 2012, winning duels against Fritz Dopfer and Mattias Hargin in the competition.

== World Cup top tens ==
Season	Date	Location	Discipline	Place
2011	6 Mar 2011	Kranjska Gora, Slovenia	Slalom	7th
2013	18 Dec 2012	Madonna di Campiglio, Italy	Slalom	6th
