= Lilian Kummer =

Swiss alpine skier (born 1975)

Lilian Kummer (born 8 July 1975 in Riederalp, Valais, Switzerland) is a retired Swiss alpine skier who competed in the 2002 Winter Olympics.
