= National Skiing Association of Lithuania =

National Skiing Association of Lithuania Lithuanian: Lietuvos nacionalinė slidinėjimo asociacija
- Sport: Cross-country skiing Freestyle skiing Snowboarding
- Category: National association
- Abbreviation: LNSA
- Founded: 1932
- Affiliation: International Ski and Snowboard Federation (FIS)
- Headquarters: Vilnius, Lithuania
- President: Remigijus Arlauskas

National Skiing Association of Lithuania (Lithuanian: Lietuvos nacionalinė slidinėjimo asociacija) is a national governing body of skiing sport in Lithuania.
