= Andrea Zinsli =

Swiss alpine skier (born 1972)

Andrea Zinsli (born 18 November 1972) is a Swiss former alpine skier who competed in the 1994 Winter Olympics.

== Achievements ==
=== International competitions ===
==== Olympic games ====
- 1994 Winter Olympics: Alpine skiing, Lillehammer, 1994: ranking 11 Slalom

==== World Championships ====
- FIS Alpine World Ski Championships 1996 Sierra Nevada 1996: ranking 4 Slalom

==== Worldcup ====
- Season 1993/94: 17. ranking Slalom
- Season 1994/95: 18. ranking Slalom
- Season 1995/96: 15. ranking Slalom
- Season 1996/97: 19. ranking Slalom

==== World Junior Championships ====
- Alpine World Junior Championships 1991 Hemsedal 1991: 3. ranking Slalom

=== National ===
- Swiss Alpine Skiing championship 1994
- Swiss Alpine Skiing championship 1995
- Swiss Alpine Skiing championship 1997
