= Renée Clerc =

Swiss alpine skier (1927–1970)

Personal information
- Nationality: Swiss
- Born: 28 January 1927 Le Locle, Switzerland
- Died: April 1970 (aged 43)

Sport
- Sport: Alpine skiing

Renée Clerc (28 January 1927 – April 1970) was a Swiss alpine skier. She competed in the women's slalom at the 1948 Winter Olympics.
