= Margrit Gertsch =

Swiss alpine skier (born 1939)

Personal information
- Nationality: Swiss
- Born: 13 December 1939 (age 85); Lauterbrunnen, Switzerland

Sport
- Sport: Alpine skiing

Margrit Gertsch (born 13 December 1939) is a Swiss alpine skier. She competed in the women's downhill at the 1960 Winter Olympics.
