= René Rey =

Swiss alpine skier (1928–2011)

Personal information
- Nationality: Swiss
- Born: 19 September 1928; Crans-Montana, Switzerland
- Died: February 2011 (aged 82)

Sport
- Sport: Alpine skiing

René Rey (19 September 1928 – February 2011) was a Swiss alpine skier. He competed in the men's slalom at the 1956 Winter Olympics.
