= Urs Lehmann =

Swiss alpine skier

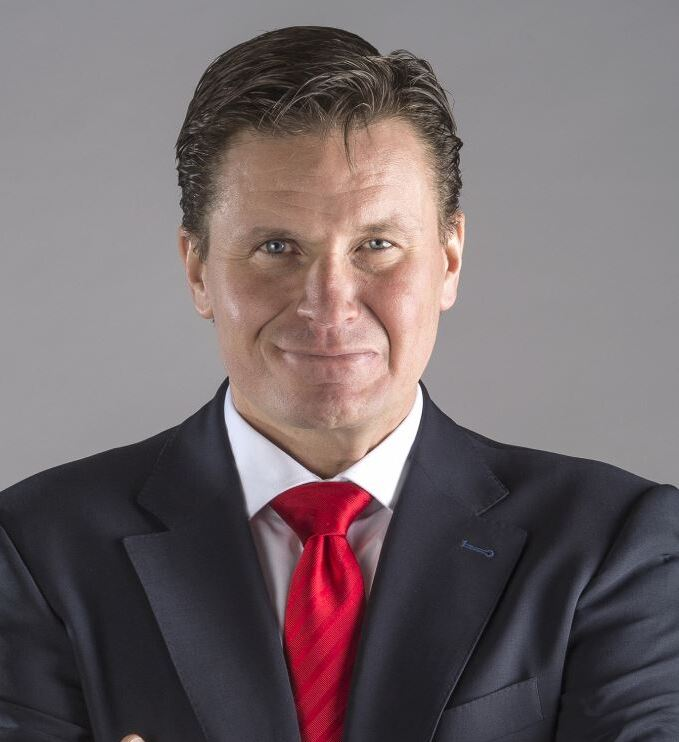
- Born: 1 April 1969 (age 57); Rudolfstetten, Switzerland
- Education: PhD in Economics from the University of Zurich in 2008, Postgraduate studies at INSEAD, Fontainebleau (France) in 2005, Master’s in Economics from the University of St. Gallen in 2001
- Known for: World Champion in alpine skiing, President of the Swiss Ski Federation, CEO of the Similisan Group and candidat for the FIS Presidency
- Partner: Conny Kissling
- Website: https://www.urs-lehmann.ch/

Urs Lehmann (born 1 April 1969) is a Swiss former alpine skier, world champion, president of the Swiss Ski Federation, CEO of the Similisan Group and candidate for the FIS presidency.

For 10 years Urs Lehmann competed in the alpine World Cup, was member of the Swiss national team and won Downhill gold at the World Championship 1993 in Morioka. He was Junior World Champion Downhill in 1987. As Eurosport Co-commentator, Salomon Race Director from 1997 – 2002 and as a member of the board of the Laureus Sports for Good Foundation Switzerland.

He has a PhD in economics from the University of Zurich and is fluent in German, English, French, Italian and Spanish.

Urs Lehmann is married to Conny Kissling (former Swiss freestyle skier and world champion in combined 1986). They have a daughter.

== Ski Racing career ==
Medal record

World Championships

Men's Alpine skiing
Gold medal – first place	1993 Morioka-Shizukuishi	Downhill

Men's Junior Alpine skiing
Gold medal – first place	1987 Hemsedal	Downhill

- His first international victory was in the 1987 Junior World Championships in Hemsedal, Norway, where we won the Downhill.
- In 1992, he won his best world cup finish of 4th in the Val Gardena Downhill. He also had his best Super G finish of 7th that year in Garmisch-Partenkirchen.
- In 1993 he won the World Championships Downhill at Morioka-Shizukuishi in Japan.
- He missed the 1994 season, and when he came back only scored points in Downhill with a further 12 top 30 finishes.
- His last race was the 1997 Garmisch-Paternkirchen Downhill. He also won the Val d'Isere Europa Cup Downhill in 1997.

== Post Ski Racing career ==
=== Business ===
He started as CEO of Similasan in January 2009. Previously, he was a management consultant with Abegglen Management Partners (2002–2005), and from 2005 to 2008 CFO at VIA MAT Gruppe.

=== Sports ===
- Urs Lehmann has been a member of the Presidium of Swiss-Ski since 2006 and President of the Swiss Ski Federation since 2008.
- He has been Co-commentator on Eurosport since 1997.
- In August 2008 he became president of the Laureus Foundation Switzerland.

=== Academic ===
He studied for his degree at University of Zurich from 1997 to 1999, his Masters at the University of St. Gallen from 1999 to 2001 and his PhD from University of Zurich from 2004 - 2009.

== Family ==
He married Conny Kissling, former Swiss freestyle skier and world champion in combined, on 1 June 2002. Their daughter is a ski racer at FIS Level.
