= Erna Steuri =

Swiss alpine skier (1917–2001)

Medal record

Representing Switzerland

Women's Alpine skiing

World Championship
Bronze medal – third place	1938 Engelberg	Slalom

Erna Steuri (22 April 1917 – 25 November 2001) was a Swiss alpine skier who competed in the 1936 Winter Olympics.

She was born in Grindelwald. In 1936 she finished fourth in the alpine skiing combined event.
