= Josef Schnyder =

Swiss cross-country skier

Josef Schnyder (January 12, 1923 – March 2, 2017) was a Swiss cross-country skier who competed in the 1950s. At the 1952 Winter Olympics in Oslo, he finished 37th in the 18 km event and 20th in the 50 km event.
