= Theres Obrecht =

Swiss alpine skier (born 1944)

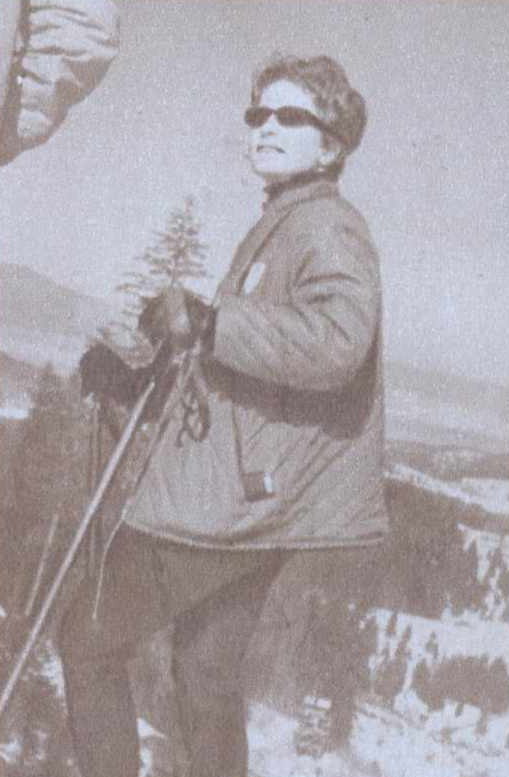

Personal information
- Nationality: Swiss
- Born: 10 January 1944 (age 81); Bern, Switzerland

Sport
- Sport: Alpine skiing

Theres Obrecht (born 10 January 1944) is a Swiss alpine skier. She competed in three events at the 1964 Winter Olympics.
