= Silvia Glatthard =

Swiss alpine skier (1930–2024)

Personal information
- Nationality: Swiss
- Born: 11 March 1930; Bern, Switzerland
- Died: 20 July 2024 (aged 94)

Sport
- Sport: Alpine skiing

Silvia Glatthard (11 March 1930 – 20 July 2024) was a Swiss alpine skier. She competed in two events at the 1952 Winter Olympics.

In 1951, she married Arnold Glatthard (1910–2002), a former alpine skier and Swiss champion in 1935. She died on 20 July 2024, at the age of 94.
