= Urs Kryenbühl =

Swiss alpine skier

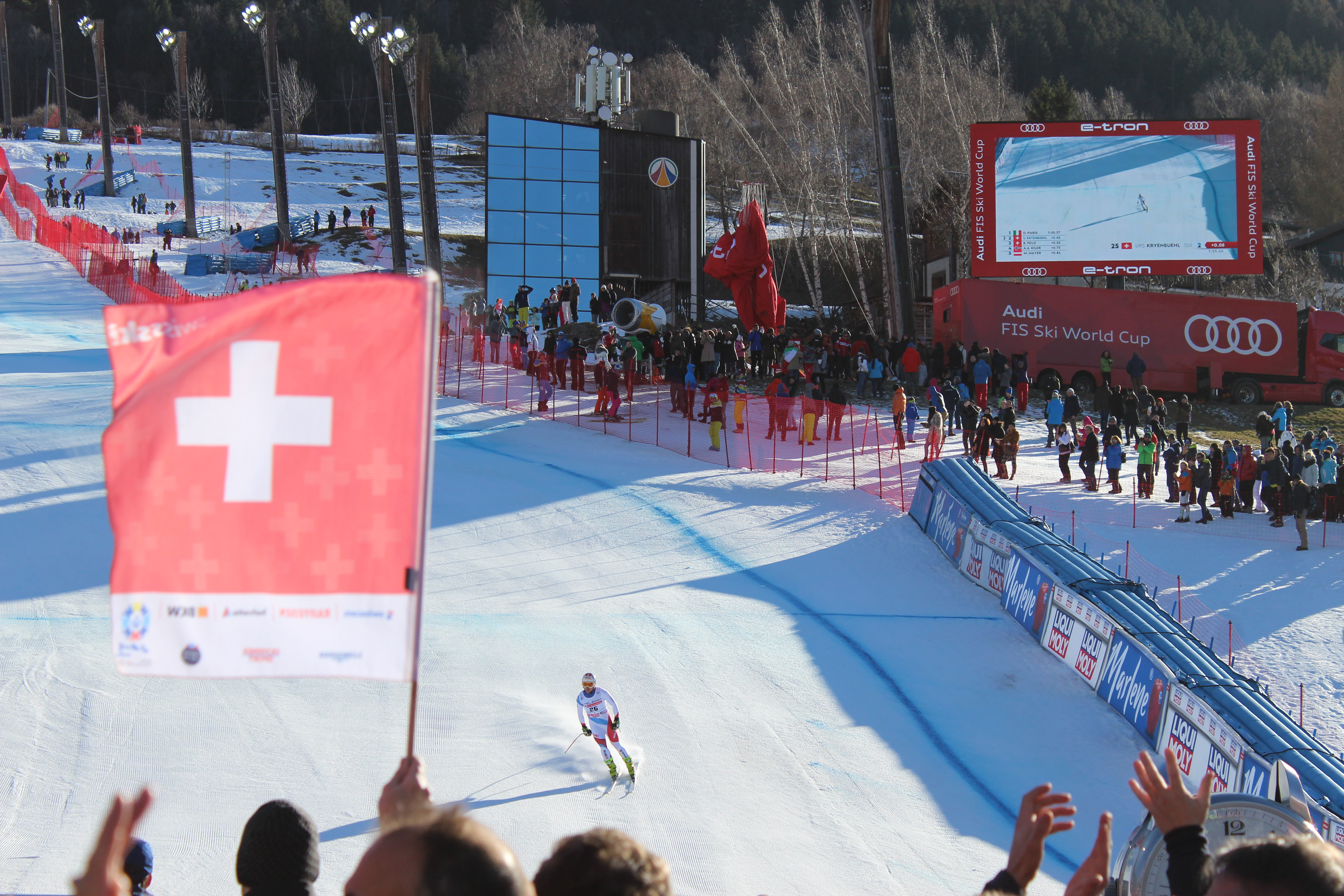
- At Bormio in December 2019

Personal information
- Born: 28 January 1994 (age 32) Switzerland
- Height: 1.72 m (5 ft 8 in)

Skiing career
- Sport: Alpine skiing
- Club: Drusberg
- Disciplines: Downhill, Super-G
- World Cup debut: 28 December 2014 (age 20)

Olympics
- Teams: 0

World Championships
- Teams: 0

World Cup
- Seasons: 7 – (2015–2021)
- Wins: 0
- Podiums: 3 – (3 DH)
- Overall titles: 0 – (44th in 2021)
- Discipline titles: 0 – (15th in DH, 2020, 2021)

Urs Kryenbühl (born 28 January 1994) is a Swiss World Cup alpine ski racer, and specializes in the speed events of Downhill and Super-G. He is part of the Swiss-Ski national team.

== Career ==
Kryenbühl made his World Cup debut in December 2014 in the Santa Caterina downhill, and finished in 25th place. His first podium was also in northern Italy, at Bormio in December 2019.

== Biography ==
Kryenbühl comes from Unteriberg in the canton of Schwyz . As a 15-year-old, he took part in FIS races from November 2009 . Initially, there were no noteworthy successes. He accomplished the Junior National races of 2012 whereupon he came to the Europa Cup in 2013. In the same month he achieved his first victory in a FIS race. Gradually, a specialization in the fast activities began to emerge. His best European Cup result was in the winter of 2012/13 and ended up in the 21st place. In January 2014 he made it into the top ten list for the first time at this level.

At the 2014 Junior World Championships in Jasná, Kryenbühl, coming into fourth place in the downhill, barely missing a medal. On March 20, 2014, he surprisingly won the Swiss downhill championship title on Fiescheralp, ahead of Carlo Janka and Patrick Küng . After a few good results in the FIS races, he made his debut in the World Cup on December 28, 2014: he finished in 25th place in the Santa Caterina Valfurva downhill run and therefore immediately won his first World Cup points. One year later, he was at 25th place again on the same route. On March 10, 2016, Kryenbühl was able to achieve the podium for the first time in the European Cup. On the first departure from Saalbach-Hinterglemm, he got 3rd place. A day later he won his first victory on the second descent in Saalbach. After that, his development faltered somewhat. In the World Cup 2016/17, Kryenbühl was only able to place in the scoreboard in the penultimate descent in Kvitfjell, in the European Cup there were no top 5 results. During the 2017/18 World Cup season, he finished in the points five times while finishing second in the European Cup three times.

Kryenbühl missed a large portion of the 2018–19 season after suffering a concussion and a bruised right shinbone in Beaver Creek in early December 2018. Nevertheless, he made it into the top 30 five more times, and he also won the European Cup in mid-March 2019. After a cautious start to the 2019–20 season, he was thirteenth in the Super-G on December 27 on the Pista Stelvio in Bormio. Surprisingly, a day later he came into second behind Italian Dominik Paris in the downhill on the same route, the same as his best result by far. While training for the Lauberhorn in Wengen, Kryenbühl fell and pulled his right ankle, and had to take a break for several weeks.

At the start of the following season, Kryenbühl finished in third in the Val-d'Isère downhill on December 13, 2020.

At Kitzbühel on January 22, 2021, he lost control on the Hahnenkamm descent on the Streif shortly before the finish and fell badly at a speed of 147 km/h (91 mph). According to the investigations, he suffered a concussion, a fracture in his right collarbone and a cruciate and medial ligament tear in his right knee. In January 2023, he said in an interview that it is clear to him that he will no longer compete in competitions up to and including the World Championships.

== World Cup results ==
=== Season standings ===
Season	Age	Overall	Slalom	Giant slalom	Super-G	Downhill	Combined
2015	20	142	—	—	—	54	—
2016	21	147	—	—	—	54	—
2017	22	111	—	—	43	42	—
2018	23	101	—	—	—	40	—
2019	24	115	—	—	58	41	—
2020	25	64	—	—	—	15	35
2021	26	44	—	—	23	15	—N/a
2022	27	81	—	—	38	34	—N/a
2023	28	78	—	—	—	31	—N/a

Standings through 2 February 2023

=== Race podiums ===
- 0 wins
- 3 podiums – (3 DH); 5 top tens

Season	Date	Location	Discipline	Position
2020	28 Dec 2019	Bormio, Italy	Downhill	2nd
2021	13 Dec 2020	Val d'Isere, France	Downhill	3rd
2021	30 Dec 2020	Bormio, Italy	Downhill	3rd
