= Andrea Dettling =

Swiss alpine skier (born 1987)

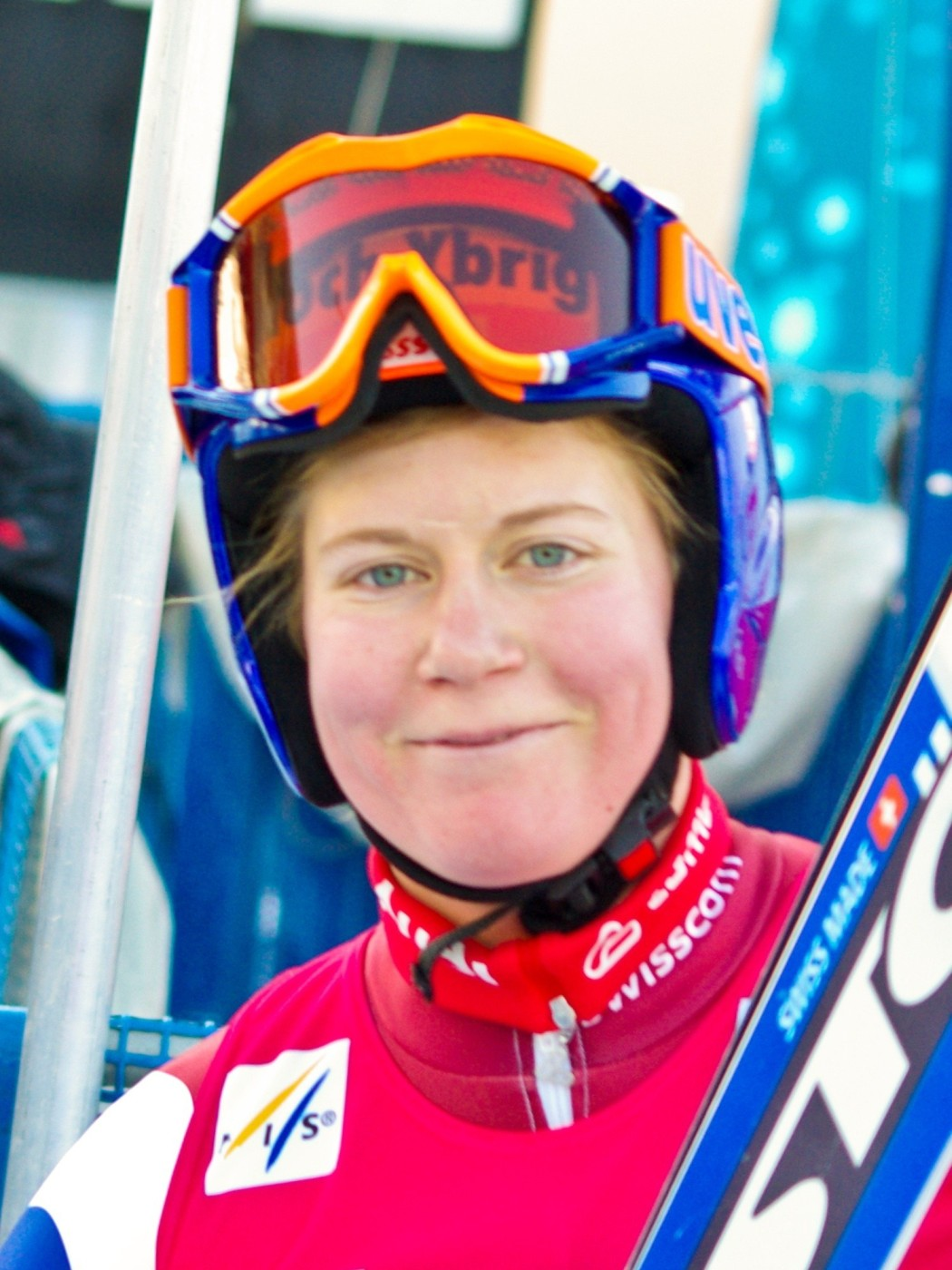
Andrea Dettling

Andrea Dettling (born 19 January 1987) is a Swiss Alpine skier. She was fifth in Super-G at the 2009 Alpine Skiing World Cup. She represented Switzerland at the 2010 Winter Olympics.
