= Rabea Grand =

Swiss alpine skier

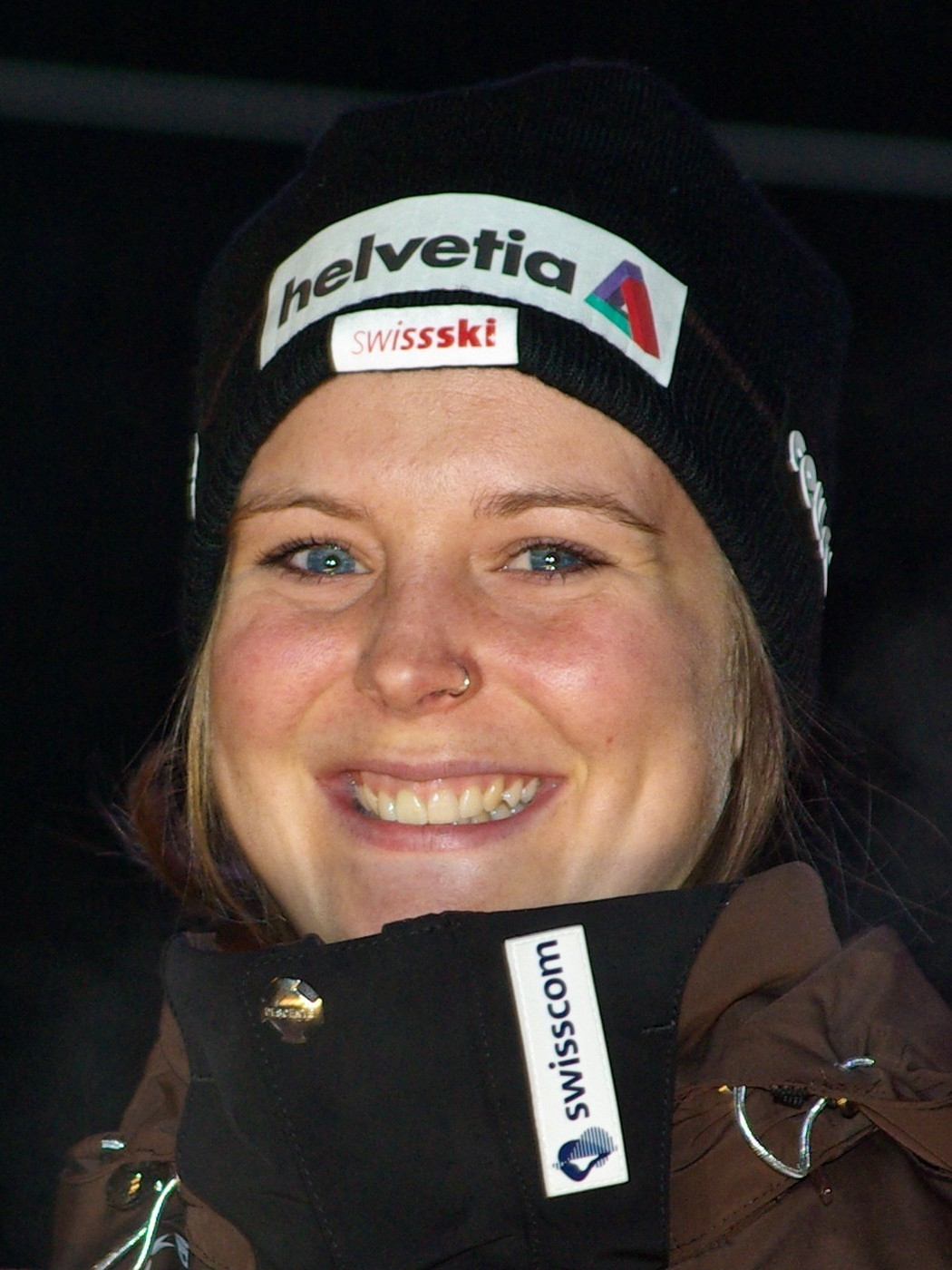

Personal information
- Born: 15 June 1984 (age 42) Leuk, Switzerland

Skiing career
- Sport: Alpine skiing
Medal record
Women's alpine skiing
Representing Switzerland
World Championships
Bronze medal – third place	2007 Åre	Team event

Rabea Grand (born 15 June 1984) is a retired alpine skier who rose to be the Swiss national champion at the giant slalom in 2009.

== Life ==
Grand was born in 1984 in Leuk in Switzerland. She was active as an FIS ski racer from December 1999 to 2011. She was in the top ten in two world cup races and she won the bronze medal as part of the team at the FIS Alpine World Ski Championships in 2007 with Sandra Gini, Nadia Styger, Fabienne Suter, Daniel Albrecht and Marc Berthod. In 2009, she was the Swiss national champion at the giant slalom. She retired in 2011.
