= Alfons Supersaxo =

Swiss cross-country skier (1926–2005)

Alfons Supersaxo (28 March 1926 – 1 May 2005) was a Swiss Nordic skier who competed in the late 1940s and early 1950s.

He died in Saas-Fee.

At the 1952 Winter Olympics, he finished tenth in the Nordic combined event and 26th in the 18 km cross-country skiing event. Supersaxo also competed in the 1948 Winter Olympics in St. Moritz, finishing 34th in the 18 km event.
