= Bernhard Perren =

Swiss alpine skier (1928–1960)

Personal information
- Born: 1 May 1928; Zermatt
- Died: 31 August 1960 (aged 32); Zermatt
- Occupation: Alpine skier

Skiing career
- Disciplines: Downhill, giant slalom, slalom, combined

Bernhard Perren (1 May 1928 – 31 August 1960) was a Swiss alpine skier and mountain guide. He was born in Zermatt.

== Selected results ==
- 1950:
  - 1st, giant slalom skiing, Lauberhorn
  - 4th, FIS Alpine World Ski Championships – Men's downhill
- 1951:
  - 1st, Swiss alpine skiing championships – Men's giant slalom
  - 1st, Swiss alpine skiing championships – Men's downhill
- 1952:
  - 1st, Swiss alpine skiing championships – Men's downhill (1952)
  - 8th, Winter Olympics – Men's giant slalom
  - 21st, Winter Olympics – Men's slalom
  - 26th, Winter Olympics – Men's downhill
- 1953:
  - 1st, Hahnenkamm, Kitzbühel – downhill (1953)
