= Georges Schneider =

Swiss alpine skier (1925–1963)

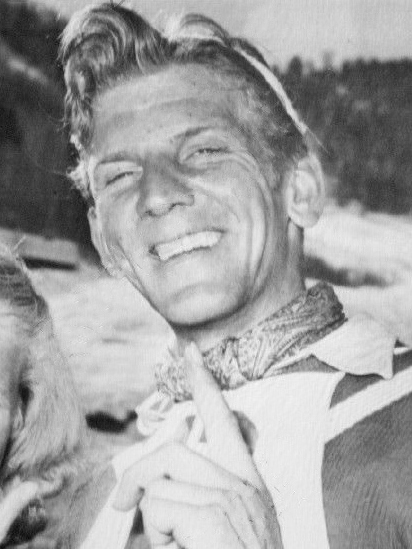
- Schneider at the 1950 World Championships

Personal information
- Born: 11 July 1925 Les Ponts-de-Martel, Switzerland
- Died: 10 September 1963 (aged 38) Oberrickenbach, Switzerland

Sport
- Sport: Alpine skiing
- Club: La Chaux-de-Fonds
Medal record
Representing Switzerland
World championship
Gold medal – first place	1950 Aspen	Slalom

Georges Schneider (11 July 1925 – 10 September 1963) was a Swiss alpine skier who won the slalom event at the 1950 World Championships. He competed at the 1948, 1952, 1956 and 1960 Winter Olympics with the best result of fifth place in the giant slalom in 1952 and in the slalom in 1956. He died in a hunting accident aged 38.
