= Franz Bumann =

Swiss alpine skier (1924–2005)

Personal information
- Nationality: Swiss
- Born: 24 October 1924; Saas-Fee, Switzerland
- Died: 15 August 2005 (aged 80); Saas-Fee, Switzerland

Sport
- Sport: Alpine skiing

Franz Bumann (24 October 1924 – 15 August 2005) was a Swiss alpine skier. He competed in the men's slalom at the 1952 Winter Olympics.
