= Idly Walpoth =

Swiss alpine skier (1920–2014)

Personal information
- Nationality: Swiss
- Born: 24 November 1920; Zürich, Switzerland
- Died: 19 March 2014 (aged 93)

Sport
- Sport: Alpine skiing

Idly Walpoth (24 November 1920 – 19 March 2014) was a Swiss alpine skier. She competed in two events at the 1952 Winter Olympics.
