= Adolf Mathis =

Swiss alpine skier (1938–2021)

Personal information
- Nationality: Swiss
- Born: 22 May 1938 Wolfenschiessen, Switzerland
- Died: 19 February 2021 (aged 82)

Sport
- Sport: Alpine skiing

Adolf Mathis (22 May 1938 – 19 February 2021) was a Swiss alpine skier. He competed at the 1960 Winter Olympics and the 1964 Winter Olympics. Until his retirement in 2003, he was in charge of the Huetstock hunting reserve. He was considered a profound expert on chamois game and also worked as a game controller. He played a leading role in the film Der Wildhüter am Brisen.
