= Nadia Styger =

Swiss alpine skier (born 1978)

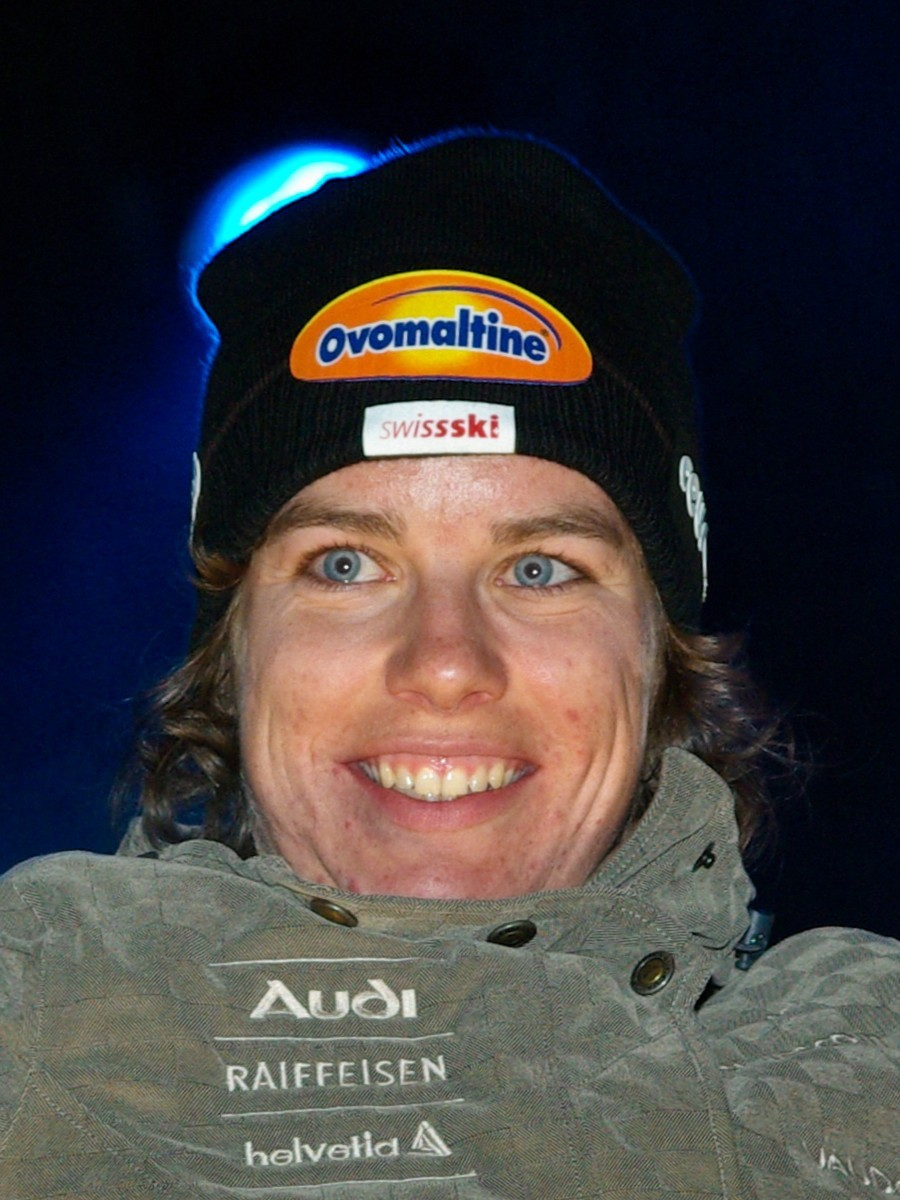

Personal information
- Born: 11 December 1978 (age 47) Zug, Switzerland
Medal record
Women's alpine skiing
Representing Switzerland
World Championships
Bronze medal – third place	2007 Åre	Team event

Nadia Styger (born 11 December 1978, in Zug) is a former Swiss World Cup alpine ski racer.

Styger won a total of four Alpine Skiing World Cup races. She was several times Swiss champion in downhill and super-G. She won a bronze medal as part of the Swiss team at the FIS Alpine World Ski Championships in 2007 with Sandra Gini, Rabea Grand, Fabienne Suter, Daniel Albrecht and Marc Berthod.

== World Cup victories ==
Date	Location	Race
11 March 2004	(Italy) Sestriere	Super-G
9 December 2005	(United States) Aspen	Super-G
3 March 2006	(Norway) Hafjell	Super-G
22 February 2008	(Canada) Whistler	Downhill
