= Marc Gini =

Swiss alpine skier (born 1984)

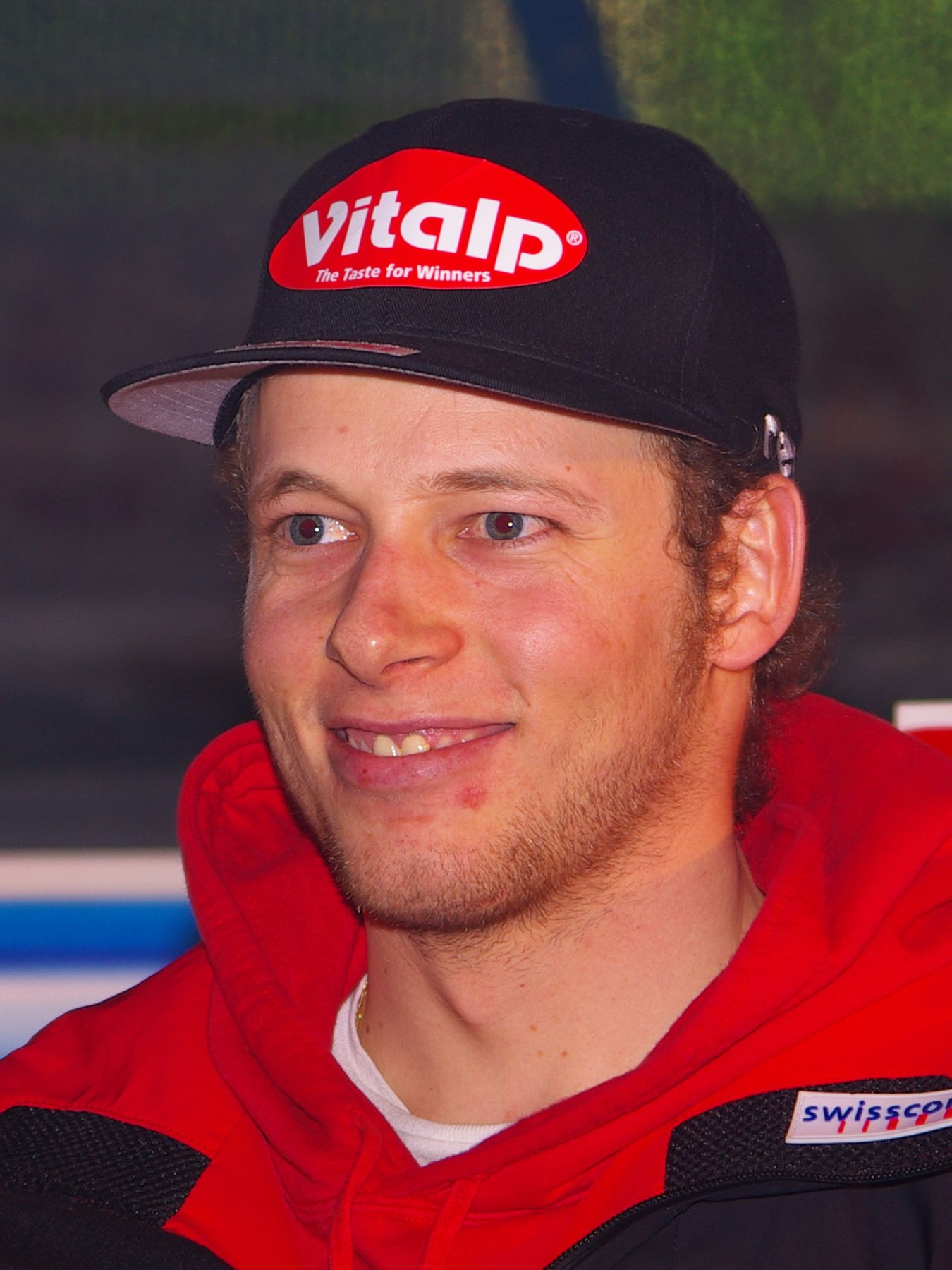

Personal information
- Born: 8 November 1984 (age 41) Castasegna, Switzerland
- Website: www.ginimarc.ch

Skiing career
- Sport: Alpine skiing
- Club: PIZ Turba Bivio
- Disciplines: SL, GS
- World Cup debut: 5 January 2003

Olympics
- Teams: 0
- Medals: 0 (0 gold)

World Championships
- Teams: 5 (2005, 2007, 2009, 2011, 2013)
- Medals: 0 (0 gold)

World Cup
- Seasons: 11
- Wins: 1
- Podiums: 1
- Overall titles: 0 (50th in 2008 and 2011)
- Discipline titles: 0 (14th in SL in 2008)

Marc Gini (born 8 November 1984 in Castasegna) is a Swiss alpine skier, specializing in slalom and giant slalom.

He started his career in 2000 and has competed in World Cup races since 2003. He was the Swiss slalom champion in 2005, 2006, and 2007, and additionally also the Swiss giant slalom champion in 2006. He won his first World Cup race on 11 November 2007.

His sister Sandra Gini is also a professional alpine skier competing in the World Cup. After a similarly unsuccessful winter in 2014/15, Gini showed an upward trend again in the 2015/16 season. He won two European Cup slaloms and finished third in the discipline rankings. In the 2016/17 World Cup season, he managed to finish in the points three times. On 7 April 2017, he announced his retirement as a top athlete.

== World Cup victories ==
Date	Location	Race
11 November 2007	(Austria) Reiteralm	Slalom
