= Madeleine Berthod =

Swiss alpine skier (born 1931)

Medal record

Women's alpine skiing

Representing Switzerland

Olympic Games
Gold medal – first place	1956 Cortina d'Ampezzo	Downhill

World Championships
Gold medal – first place	1956 Cortina d'Ampezzo	Combined
Silver medal – second place	1954 Åre	Giant Slalom
Silver medal – second place	1954 Åre	Combined

Madeleine Chamot-Berthod (born 1 February 1931) is a Swiss former alpine skier. She was born in Château d'Oex, Vaud. Berthod was Swiss Sportspersonality of the year in 1956. She competed at the 1952, 1956 and the 1960 Winter Olympics, winning gold in the women's downhill at the 1956 Games.
