= Sylviane Berthod =

Swiss alpine skier (born 1977)

Sylviane Berthod (born 25 April 1977 in Salins) is a female alpine skier from Switzerland, who was Swiss champion in downhill skiing (1997, 1998, 1999) and Giant slalom (1998). At the 2002 Winter Olympics, she finished 7th in downhill.
