= Olivia Ausoni =

Swiss alpine skier (1923–2010)

Personal information
- Nationality: Swiss
- Born: 20 April 1923; Villars-sur-Ollon, Switzerland
- Died: 15 May 2010 (aged 87)

Sport
- Sport: Alpine skiing

Olivia Ausoni (20 April 1923 – 15 May 2010) was a Swiss alpine skier. She competed at the 1948 Winter Olympics and the 1952 Winter Olympics.
