= Tobias Grünenfelder =

Swiss alpine skier (born 1977)

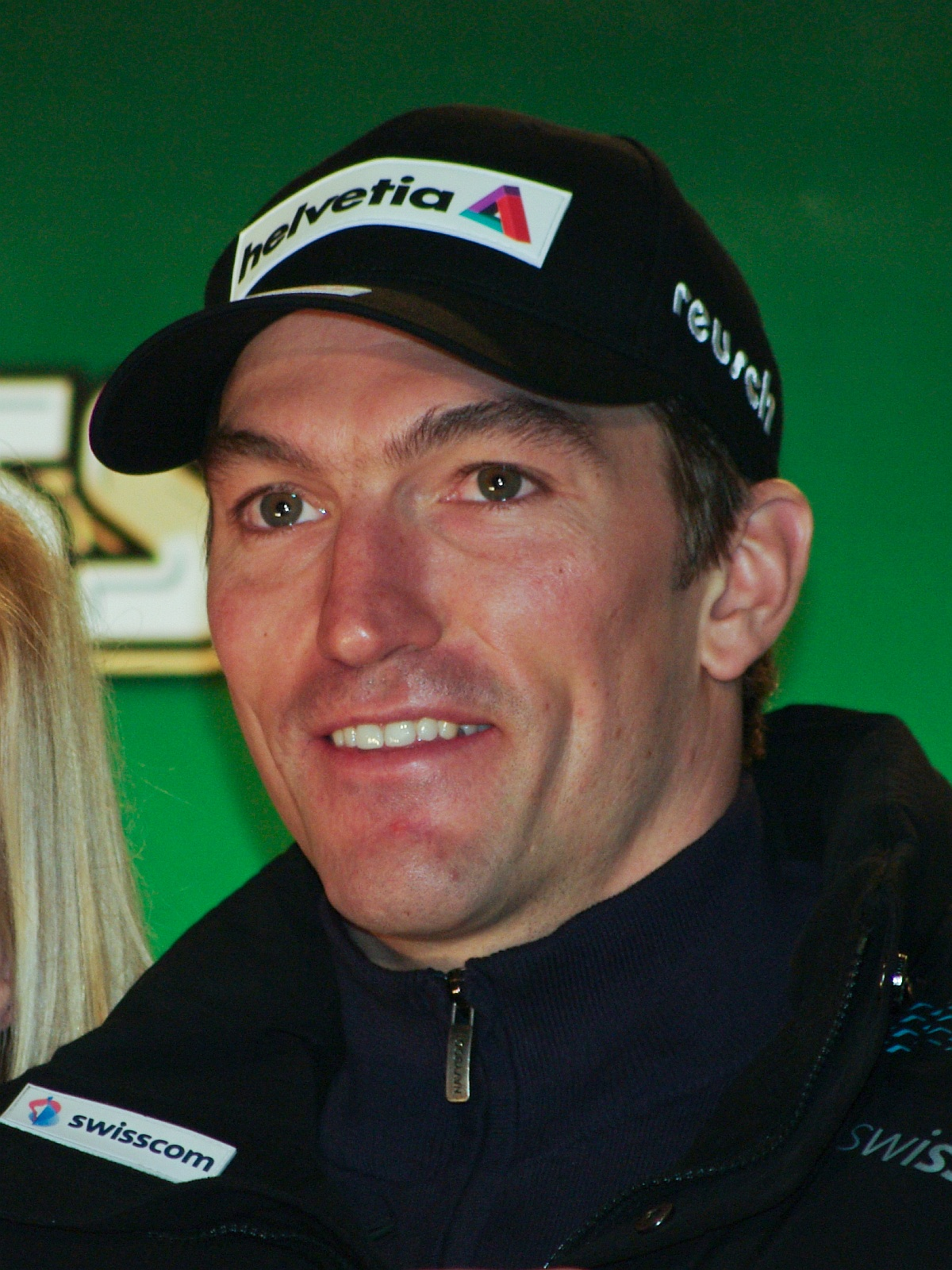

Personal information
- Born: 27 November 1977 (age 48) Elm, Glarus Süd, Switzerland
- Height: 5 ft 11 in (1.80 m)
- Website: www.grueni.ch

Skiing career
- Sport: Alpine skiing
- Club: SC Elm
- Disciplines: Downhill, super-G, giant slalom, combined
- World Cup debut: 5 January 2007 (age 19)

Olympics
- Teams: 3
- Medals: 0

World Championships
- Teams: 3
- Medals: 0

World Cup
- Seasons: 15
- Wins: 1
- Podiums: 5

Tobias Grünenfelder (born 27 November 1977 in Elm) is a Swiss alpine skier. He is the 2005, 2006, 2009 and 2010 Swiss champion in super-G. He also won national Downhill gold in 2007 and 2009.

He participated at the World Championships in Vail 1999, St. Moritz 2003 and Bormio 2005 and competed at the 2002, 2006 and 2010 Winter Olympics.

He earned his maiden World Cup victory during a super-G event in Lake Louise, during the 2011, edging the reigning World Cup champion and teammate Carlo Janka.

His brother Jürg Grünenfelder is an alpine skier as well.

== World Cup Victories ==
Date	Place	Country	Event
28 November 2010	Lake Louise	Canada	Super-G

== Other podiums ==
- 3rd super-G World Cup race in Kvitfjell (2009/2010)
- 3rd downhill World Cup race in Bormio (2005/2006)
- 3rd super-G World Cup race in Garmisch (2003/2004)
- 3rd super-G World Cup race in Garmisch (2002/2003)
