= Swiss Ski =

Sport governing body

- Jurisdiction: Switzerland
- Founded: 1904
- Headquarters: Bern
- Location: Switzerland
- President: Urs Lehmann

Official website
- www.swiss-ski.ch

The Swiss Ski (before Swiss Ski Association, abbrev. SSV), is the winter sports federation for Switzerland. Part of the International Ski and Snowboard Federation (FIS), it deals with some federations conducting sports for the Winter Olympics, including skiing, biathlon and ski jumping.

== Sports ==
- Alpine skiing
- Cross-country skiing
- Nordic Combined
- Ski jumping
- Biathlon
- Snowboarding
- Ski cross
- Freestyle skiing
- Telemark skiing

== Organization chart ==
Swiss Ski is headquartered in Bern Worbstrasse 52, Muri bei Bern, 3074 CH.

Head coaches alpine skiing

- Thomas Stauffer (men)
- Beat Tschuor (women)

== See also ==
- Switzerland national alpine ski team
- Swiss Alpine Ski Championships
