= Fabienne Suter =

Swiss alpine skier

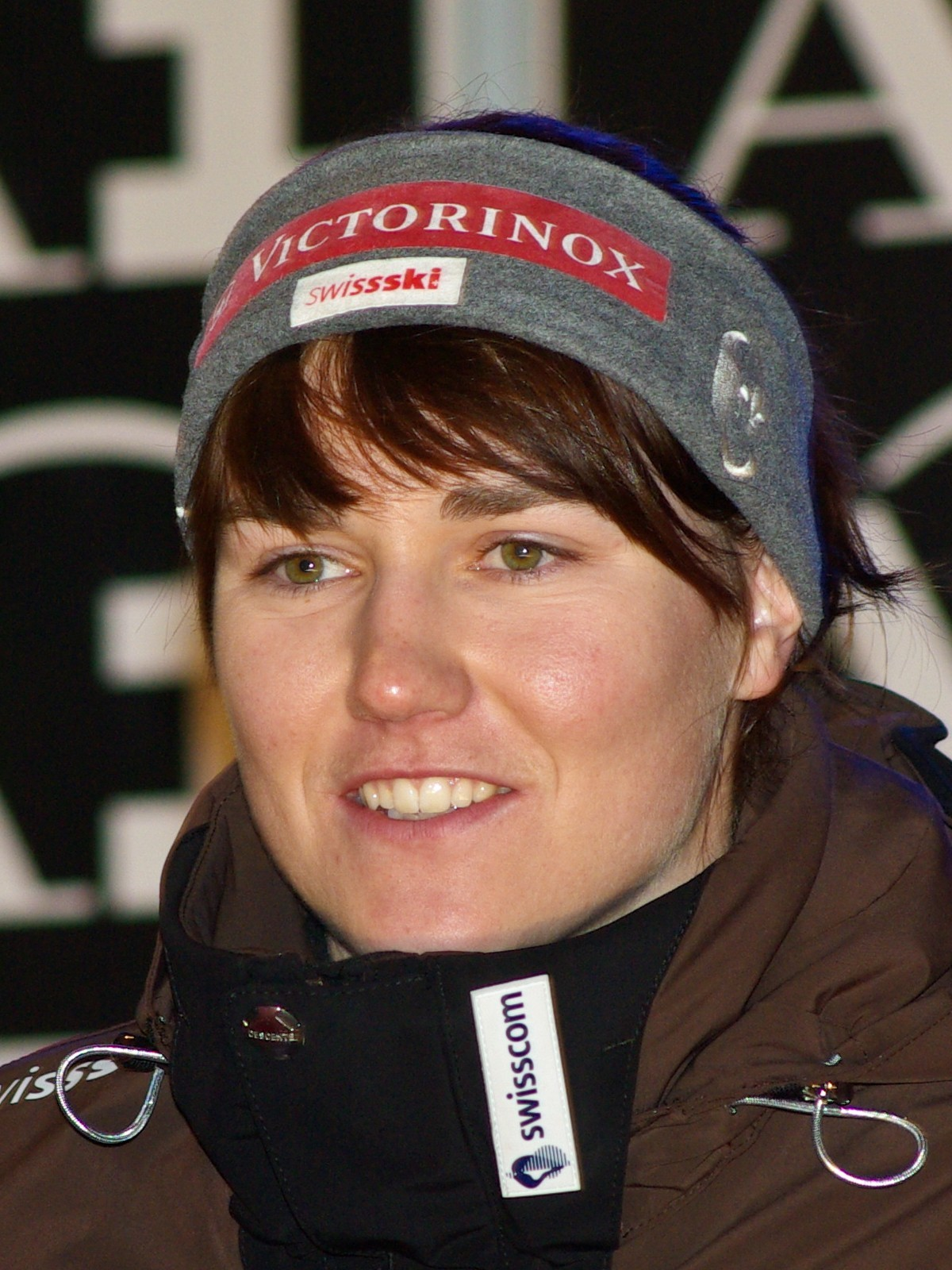
- January 2009

Personal information
- Born: 5 January 1985 (age 41) Sattel, Schwyz, Switzerland
- Height: 168 cm (5 ft 6 in)
- Website: fabienne-suter.ch

Skiing career
- Sport: Alpine skiing
- Club: Hochstuckli Sattel
- Retired: 21 April 2017 (age 32)
- Disciplines: Downhill, Super-G, giant slalom, combined
- World Cup debut: 12 December 2002 (age 17)

Olympics
- Teams: 2 – (2010, 2014)
- Medals: 0

World Championships
- Teams: 7 – (2003, 2007–17)
- Medals: 1 (0 gold)

World Cup
- Seasons: 12 – (2003, 2007–17)
- Wins: 4 – (1 DH, 3 SG)
- Podiums: 20 – (8 DH, 11 SG, 1 SC)
- Overall titles: 0 – (7th in 2009, 2010)
- Discipline titles: 0 – (2nd in DH, 2016)
Medal record
Women's alpine skiing
Representing Switzerland
World Championships
Bronze medal – third place	2007 Åre	Team event

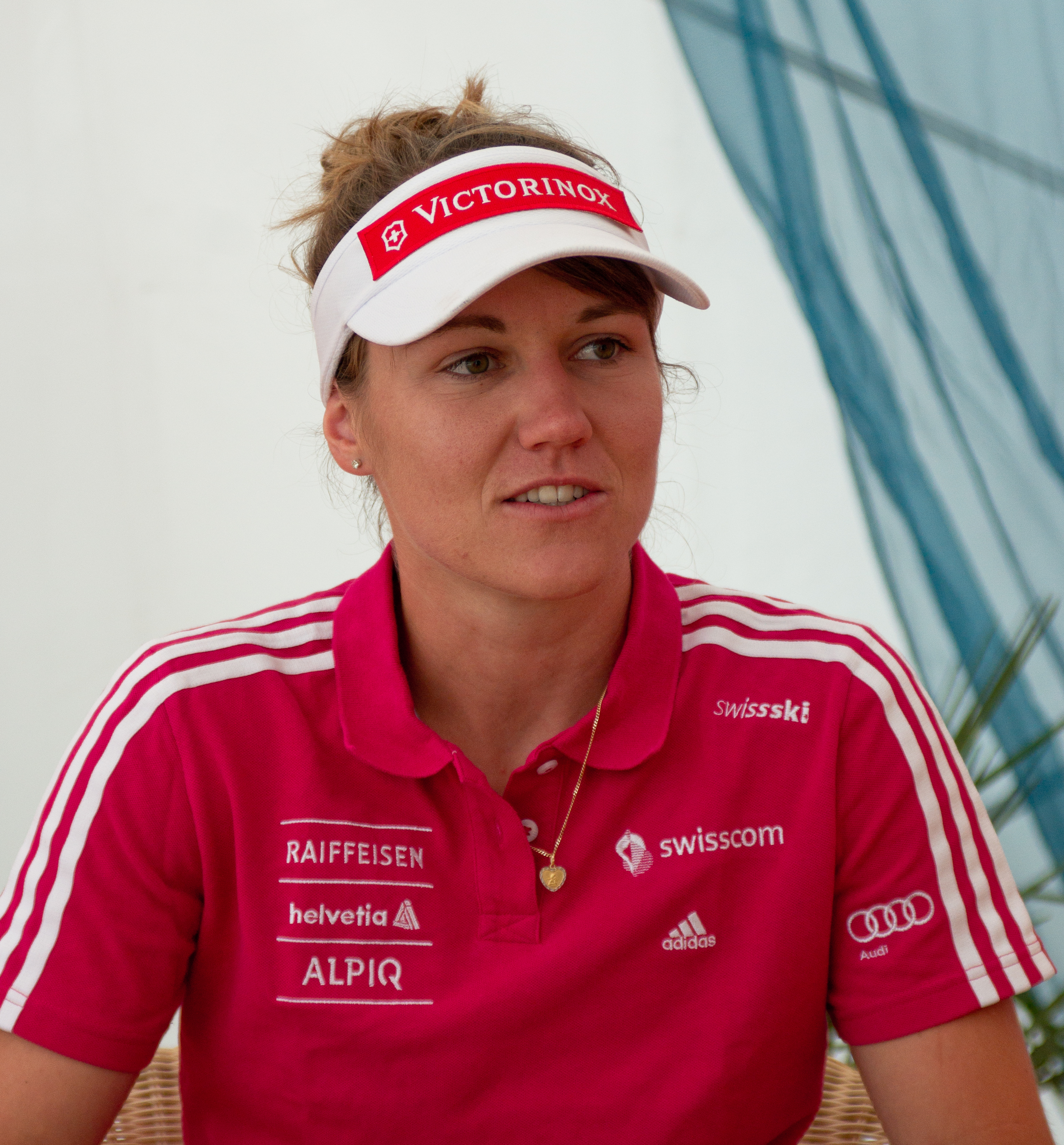
Suter in July 2011

Fabienne Suter (born 5 January 1985) is a former World Cup alpine ski racer from Switzerland. Born in Sattel in the canton of Schwyz, she specialized in super-G, giant slalom, and downhill.

== Career ==
At the 2003 World Championships in St. Moritz, she fell in the giant slalom and injured her pelvis. While recovering, Suter resided in Calgary, Canada, with close family friends. This was followed by other injuries. Following appearances in FIS and Europa Cup races, she returned to the World Cup in for the 2007 season. She won a bronze medal as part of the team at the FIS Alpine World Ski Championships in 2007 with Sandra Gini, Nadia Styger, Rabea Grand, Daniel Albrecht and Marc Berthod.

Her first top ten finish was in February 2008, a seventh place in downhill in St. Moritz. The next week she won her first World Cup race in the super-G in Sestriere, tied with Andrea Fischbacher. At the World Cup finals in Bormio, she won another super-G race on 13 March.

In the 2007 World Championships in Åre, Sweden, Suter came in 11th in the super-G and 13th in the giant slalom, having had to start with a higher number. With the Swiss team she won the bronze medal in the team event, having contributed the second-fastest time in the super-G run.

== World Cup results ==
=== Season standings ===
Season	Age	Overall	Slalom	Giant slalom	Super-G	Downhill	Combined
2003	18	110	—	48	—	—	—
2007	22	95	—	46	36	—	—
2008	23	21	—	35	3	35	—
2009	24	7	—	20	3	8	6
2010	25	7	—	27	4	7	6
2011	26	18	—	31	12	15	13
2012	27	18	—	36	5	16	—
2013	28	28	—	44	7	25	—
2014	29	30	—	47	23	14	22
2015	30	25	—	—	20	9	—
2016	31	11	—	—	11	2	—
2017	32	69	—	—	40	26	—

=== Race podiums ===
- 4 wins – (1 DH, 3 SG)
- 20 podiums – (8 DH, 11 SG, 1 SC)

Season	Date	Location	Discipline	Place
2008	10 Feb 2008	Sestriere, Italy	Super-G	1st
2008	13 Mar 2008	Bormio, Italy	Super-G	1st
2009	7 Dec 2008	Lake Louise, Canada	Super-G	2nd
2009	19 Dec 2008	St. Moritz, Switzerland	Super combined	3rd
2009	20 Dec 2008	St. Moritz, Switzerland	Super-G	2nd
2009	22 Feb 2009	Tarvisio, Italy	Super-G	2nd
2009	27 Feb 2009	Bansko, Bulgaria	Downhill	1st
2009	28 Feb 2009	Bansko, Bulgaria	Downhill	3rd
2009	1 Mar 2009	Bansko, Bulgaria	Super-G	2nd
2010	22 Jan 2010	Cortina d'Ampezzo, Italy	Super-G	2nd
2010	30 Jan 2010	St. Moritz, Switzerland	Downhill	3rd
2012	7 Dec 2011	(United States) Beaver Creek, USA	Super-G	2nd
2012	7 Jan 2012	Bad Kleinkirchheim, Austria	Downhill	3rd
2012	8 Jan 2012	Bad Kleinkirchheim, Austria	Super-G	1st
2013	13 Jan 2013	St. Anton, Austria	Super-G	3rd
2016	5 Dec 2015	Lake Louise, Canada	Downhill	2nd
2016	19 Dec 2015	Val-d'Isère, France	Downhill	2nd
2016	6 Feb 2016	Garmisch, Germany	Downhill	2nd
2016	12 Mar 2016	Lenzerheide, Switzerland	Super-G	2nd
2016	16 Mar 2016	St. Moritz, Switzerland	Downhill	2nd

== World Championship results ==
Year	Age	Slalom	Giant slalom	Super-G	Downhill	Combined
2003	18	—	DNF2	—	—	—
2005	20					
2007	22	—	13	11	—	—
2009	24	—	—	11	17	8
2011	26	—	DNS1	8	13	DNS2
2013	28	—	DSN2	5	—	—
2015	30	—	—	22	9	—
2017	32	—	—	—	7	—

== Olympic results ==
Year	Age	Slalom	Giant slalom	Super-G	Downhill	Combined
2010	25	—	4	13	5	6
2014	29	—	26	7	5	—
