= Ida Schöpfer =

Swiss alpine skier (1929–2014)

Medal record

Women's Alpine Skiing

Representing Switzerland

World Championships
Gold medal – first place	1954 Åre	Downhill
Gold medal – first place	1954 Åre	Combined
Silver medal – second place	1954 Åre	Slalom

Ida Schöpfer (22 October 1929 – 7 June 2014) was a Swiss alpine skier, ten times Swiss champion in alpine skiing and 1954 World Champion in Downhill skiing and Alpine combined. She competed in the 1952 Winter Olympics, but did not achieve a medal. Ida Schöpfer then became the first woman to be elected Swiss Sportsman of the Year in 1954. The Flühli Ski Club organized a "World Cup Week" in her honor in 2004, during which documents and objects were exhibited and Karl Erb and Bernhard Russi, among others, took part. Ida Schöpfer died in her hometown of Flühli in June 2014 at the age of 84.
