= List of law enforcement agencies in Minnesota =

This is a list of law enforcement agencies in the state of Minnesota.

According to the US Bureau of Justice Statistics' 2008 Census of State and Local Law Enforcement Agencies, the state had 448 law enforcement agencies employing 9,667 sworn police officers, about 185 for each 100,000 residents.

== State agencies ==
- Minnesota Department of Corrections
- Minnesota Department of Natural Resources
  - Law Enforcement Division
- Minnesota Department of Public Safety
  - Minnesota Bureau of Criminal Apprehension
  - Minnesota State Fire Marshal
  - Minnesota Alcohol Gambling Enforcement Division
  - Minnesota State Patrol
    - Capitol Security
- Minnesota Department of Commerce
  - Fraud Bureau
- Minnesota National Guard
  - Dept. of Military Affairs Security Police
  - Military Police
    - 34th Military Police Company
    - 257th Military Police Company
  - Security Forces
    - 148th Security Forces Squadron
    - 133rd Security Forces Squadron
      - Phoenix Raven Team

== County agencies ==
- Aitkin County Sheriff's Office
- Anoka County Sheriff's Office
- Becker County Sheriff's Office
- Beltrami County Sheriff's Office
- Benton County Sheriff's Office
- Big Stone County Sheriff's Office
- Blue Earth County Sheriff's Office
- Brown County Sheriff's Office
- Carlton County Sheriff's Office
- Carver County Sheriff's Office
- Cass County Sheriff's Office
- Chippewa County Sheriff's Office
- Chisago County Sheriff's Office
- Clay County Sheriff's Office
- Clearwater County Sheriff's Office
- Cook County Sheriff's Office
- Cottonwood County Sheriff's Office
- Crow Wing County Sheriff's Office
- Dakota County Sheriff's Office
- Dodge County Sheriff's Office
- Douglas County Sheriff's Office
- Faribault County Sheriff's Office
- Fillmore County Sheriff's Office
- Freeborn County Sheriff's Office
- Goodhue County Sheriff's Office
- Grant County Sheriff's Office
- Hennepin County Sheriff's Office
- Houston County Sheriff's Office
- Hubbard County Sheriff's Office
- Isanti County Sheriff's Office
- Itasca County Sheriff's Office
- Jackson County Sheriff's Office
- Kanabec County Sheriff's Office
- Kandiyohi County Sheriff's Office
- Kittson County Sheriff's Office
- Koochiching County Sheriff's Office
- Lac qui Parle County Sheriff's Office
- Lake County Sheriff's Office
- Lake of the Woods County Sheriff's Office
- Le Sueur County Sheriff's Office
- Lincoln County Sheriff's Office
- Lyon County Sheriff's Office
- Mahnomen County Sheriff's Office
- Marshall County Sheriff's Office
- Martin County Sheriff's Office
- McLeod County Sheriff's Office
- Meeker County Sheriff's Office
- Mille Lacs County Sheriff's Office
- Morrison County Sheriff's Office
- Mower County Sheriff's Office
- Murray County Sheriff's Office
- Nicollet County Sheriff's Office
- Nobles County Sheriff's Office
- Norman County Sheriff's Office
- Olmsted County Sheriff's Office
- Otter Tail County Sheriff's Office
- Pennington County Sheriff's Office
- Pine County Sheriff's Office
- Pipestone County Sheriff's Office
- Polk County Sheriff's Office
- Pope County Sheriff's Office
- Ramsey County Sheriff's Office
- Red Lake County Sheriff's Office
- Redwood County Sheriff's Office
- Renville County Sheriff's Office
- Rice County Sheriff's Office
- Rock County Sheriff's Office
- Roseau County Sheriff's Office
- Saint Louis County Sheriff's Office
- Scott County Sheriff's Office
- Sherburne County Sheriff's Office
- Sibley County Sheriff's Office
- Stearns County Sheriff's Office
- Steele County Sheriff's Office
- Stevens County Sheriff's Office
- Swift County Sheriff's Office
- Todd County Sheriff's Office
- Traverse County Sheriff's Office
- Wabasha County Sheriff's Office
- Wadena County Sheriff's Office
- Waseca County Sheriff's Office
- Washington County Sheriff's Office
- Watonwan County Sheriff's Office
- Wilkin County Sheriff's Office
- Winona County Sheriff's Office
- Wright County Sheriff's Office
- Yellow Medicine County Sheriff's Office

== City agencies ==
- Ada Police Department
- Adrian Police Department
- Aitkin Police Department
- Akeley Police Department
- Albany Police Department
- Albert Lea Police Department
- Alexandria Police Department
- Annandale Police Department
- Anoka Police Department
- Apple Valley Police Department
- Appleton Police Department
- Arlington-Green Isle Police Department
- Atwater Police Department
- Audubon Police Department
- Austin Police Department
- Avon Police Department
- Babbitt Police Department
- Bagley Police Department
- Barnesville Police Department
- Battle Lake Police Department
- Baudette Police Department
- Baxter Police Department
- Bayport Police Department
- Becker Police Department
- Belgrade Police Department
- Belle Plaine Police Department
- Bemidji Police Department
- Benson Police Department
- Big Lake Police Department
- Bird Island Police Department
- Biwabik Police Department
- Blaine Police Department
- Blooming Prairie Police Department
- Bloomington Police Department
- Blue Earth Police Department
- Bovey Police Department
- Boyd Police Department
- Braham Police Department
- Brainerd Police Department
- Breckenridge Police Department
- Breezy Point Police Department
- Brooklyn Center Police Department
- Brooklyn Park Police Department
- Brownton Police Department
- Buffalo Police Department
- Buffalo Lake Police Department
- Buhl Police Department
- Burnsville Police Department
- Caledonia Police Department
- Cambridge Police Department
- Canby Police Department
- Cannon Falls Police Department
- Callaway Police Department
- Champlin Police Department
- Chaska Police Department
- Chatfield Police Department
- Chisago City Police Department
- Chisholm Police Department
- Circle Pines Police Department
- Clara City Police Department
- Clarkfield Police Department
- Clearbrook Police Department
- Cloquet Police Department
- Cold Spring Richmond Police Department
- Coleraine Police Department
- Columbia Heights Police Department
- Coon Rapids Police Department
- Corcoran Police Department
- Cottage Grove Police Department
- Crookston Police Department
- Crosby Police Department
- Crosslake Police Department
- Crystal Police Department
- Cuyuna Police Department
- Dawson Police Department
- Deephaven Police Department
- Deer River Police Department
- Deerwood Police Department
- Detroit Lakes Police Department
- Dilworth Police Department
- Duluth Police Department
- Dundas Police Department
- Eagan Police Department
- Eagle Lake Police Department
- East Grand Forks Police Department
- Echo Police Department
- Eden Prairie Police Department
- Edina Police Department
- Elbow Lake Police Department
- Elk River Police Department
- Elko New Market Police Department
- Ely Police Department
- Emily Police Department
- Eveleth Police Department
- Fairmont Police Department
- Faribault Police Department
- Farmington Police Department
- Fergus Falls Police Department
- Fisher Police Department
- Foley Police Department
- Forest Lake Police Department
- Fosston Police Department
- Frazee Police Department
- Fridley Police Department
- Fulda Police Department
- Gaylord Police Department
- Gibbon Police Department
- Gilbert Police Department
- Glencoe Police Department
- Glenwood Police Department
- Goodhue Police Department
- Goodview Police Department
- Grand Marais Police Department
- Grand Rapids Police Department
- Granite Falls Police Department
- Hackensack Police Department
- Hallock Police Department
- Hancock Police Department
- Hastings Police Department
- Hawley Police Department
- Hector Police Department
- Henderson Police Department
- Hendricks Police Department
- Henning Police Department
- Hermantown Police Department
- Hibbing Police Department
- Hill City Police Department
- Hokah Police Department
- Hopkins Police Department
- Houston Police Department
- Howard Lake Police Department
- Hoyt Lakes Police Department
- Hutchinson Police Department
- International Falls Police Department
- Inver Grove Heights Police Department
- Isle Police Department
- Ivanhoe Police Department
- Jackson Police Department
- Janesville Police Department
- Jordan Police Department
- Kasson Police Department
- Keewatin Police Department
- La Crescent Police Department
- Lake Benton Police Department
- Lake City Police Department
- Lake Park Police Department
- Lake Crystal Police Department
- Lakefield Police Department
- Lakeville Police Department
- Lamberton Police Department
- Le Center Police Department
- Le Sueur Police Department
- Lester Prairie Police Department
- Lewiston Police Department
- Lindstrom Police Department
- Lino Lakes Police Department
- Litchfield Police Department
- Little Falls Police Department
- Long Prairie Police Department
- Lonsdale Police Department
- Madelia Police Department
- Madison Police Department
- Madison Lake Police Department
- Mankato Police Department
- Maple Grove Police Department
- Mapleton Police Department
- Maplewood Police Department
- Medina Police Department
- Melrose Police Department
- Menahga Police Department
- Mendota Heights Police Department
- Milaca Police Department
- Mille Lacs Band Police Department
- Minneapolis Police Department
- Minneota Police Department
- Minnetonka Police Department
- Minnetrista Police Department
- Montevideo Police Department
- Montgomery Police Department
- Moorhead Police Department
- Moose Lake Police Department
- Mora Police Department
- Morgan Police Department
- Morris Police Department
- Mound Police Department
- Mounds View Police Department
- Mountain Lake Police Department
- Nashwauk Police Department
- Nett Lake Police Department
- New Brighton Police Department
- New Hope Police Department
- New Prague Police Department
- New Richland Police Department
- New Ulm Police Department
- New York Mills Police Department
- Newport Police Department
- North Branch Police Department
- North Mankato Police Department
- North St Paul Police Department
- Northfield Police Department
- Oakdale Police Department
- Olivia Police Department
- Ortonville Police Department
- Osakis Police Department
- Osseo Police Department
- Owatonna Police Department
- Park Rapids Police Department
- Parkers Prairie Police Department
- Paynesville Police Department
- Pelican Rapids Police Department
- Pequot Lake Police Department
- Perham Police Department
- Pierz Police Department
- Pine River Police Department
- Plainview Police Department
- Plymouth Police Department
- Preston Police Department
- Princeton Police Department
- Prior Lake Police Department
- Proctor Police Department
- Ramsey Police Department
- Red Wing Police Department
- Redwood Falls Police Department
- Renville Police Department
- Richfield Police Department
- Robbinsdale Police Department
- Rochester Police Department
- Rogers Police Department
- Roseau Police Department
- Rosemount Police Department
- Roseville Police Department
- Rushford Police Department
- Sartell Police Department
- Sauk Centre Police Department
- Sauk Rapids Police Department
- Savage Police Department
- Sebeka Police Department
- Shakopee Police Department
- Sherburn Police Department
- Silver Bay Police Department
- Silver Lake Police Department
- Slayton Police Department
- Sleepy Eye Police Department
- South Lake Minnetonka Police Department
- Spring Grove Police Department
- Spring Lake Park Police Department
- Springfield Police Department
- St. Anthony Police Department
- St. Charles Police Department
- St. Cloud Police Department
- St. Francis Police Department
- St. James Police Department
- St. Joseph Police Department
- St. Louis Park Police Department
- St. Paul Police Department
- St. Paul Park Police Department
- Staples Police Department
- Starbuck Police Department
- Stewart Police Department
- Stillwater Police Department
- Thief River Falls Police Department
- Tracy Police Department
- Truman Police Department
- Twin Valley Police Department (Disbanded)
- Two Harbors Police Department
- Tyler Police Department
- Virginia Police Department
- Wabasha Police Department
- Wadena Police Department
- Waite Park Police Department
- Walker Police Department
- Warren Police Department
- Warroad Police Department
- Waseca Police Department
- Waterville Police Department
- Watkins Police Department
- Wayzata Police Department
- Wells Police Department
- West Concord Police Department
- West St Paul Police Department
- Westbrook Police Department
- Wheaton Police Department
- White Bear Lake Police Department
- Willmar Police Department
- Windom Police Department
- Winnebago Police Department
- Winona Police Department
- Winsted Police Department
- Winthrop Police Department
- Woodbury Police Department
- Worthington Police Department
- Wyoming Police Department
- Zumbrota Police Department

== Township agencies ==
- Breitung Police Department

== Tribal agencies ==
- Fond du Lac Tribal Police Department
- Leech Lake Tribal Police Department
- Lower Sioux Tribal Police Department
- Prairie Island Tribal Police Department
- Red Lake Tribal Police Department
- Upper Sioux Community Police Department
- White Earth Tribal Police Department

== Other agencies ==
- Department of Defense Police
- Federal Bureau of Investigation
- Federal Bureau of Prisons
- Minneapolis Park Police Department
- Minneapolis St. Paul International Airport Police Department
- Metropolitan Metro Transit Police Department
- Three Rivers Park District Police Department
- United States Department of Veterans Affairs Police
- United States Federal Protective Service Police
- United States Federal Reserve Police
- Office of the United States Marshal for the District of Minnesota
- University of Minnesota Duluth Police Department
- University of Minnesota Police Department
