= Broomhall (surname) =

Broomhall is an English surname. Notable people with the surname include:

- Alfred James Broomhall (1911–1994), British Protestant Christian medical missionary to China
- Arthur Broomhall (1860–?), English footballer
- Benjamin Broomhall (1829–1911), British advocate of foreign missions
- Chummy Broomhall (1919–2017), American cross-country skier
- Erlon "Bucky" Broomhall (b. 1931), American skiing advocate
- John Broomhall (21st century), English composer and audio producer
- Keith Broomhall (b. 1951), English footballer
- Marshall Broomhall (1866–1937), British Protestant Christian missionary to China
- Sam Broomhall (b. 1976), New Zealand rugby union player
- Susan Broomhall, Australian historian and academic
