= Black Mountain of Maine =

Ski area in Rumford, Maine

- Interactive map of Black Mountain of Maine
- Location: Rumford, Maine, U.S.
- Nearest city: Lewiston, Maine
- Coordinates: 44°34′48″N 70°37′3″W
- Status: Operating (seasonally)
- Vertical: 1,380 ft (420 m)
- Base elevation: 1,000 ft (300 m)
- Trails: 46
- Lift system: 3 (2 chair, 1 T-bar)
- Terrain parks: 1
- Snowmaking: Yes, 90%
- Night skiing: Yes, 16 trails
- Website: www.skiblackmountain.org

Black Mountain of Maine is a ski resort in Rumford, Maine, which is most famous for its Nordic skiing facilities, and has hosted several national cross-country skiing championships on its 17 km (11 miles) of trails.

The downhill skiing area was expanded in 2005, and has 46 trails (including 17 glades) serviced by two chairlifts. It also has a terrain park, and a separate snow tubing area.

== History ==
In 1924, the Chisholm Ski Club was organized in Oxford, and soon after built a ski jump in town followed by cross country trails and eventually a small ski slope. This early site held statewide cross-country competitions.

In 1950, the cross-country portion of the FIS Nordic World Ski Championships was held at this early Rumford ski area, after the planned site of Lake Placid, New York, did not have enough snow. The competitors were housed with town residents as there were not enough hotel beds available. The following year, the site also held the tryouts for the 1952 Olympic United States Ski Team, and two skiers from Rumford (Chummy Broomhall and Bob Pidacks) made the team.

The ski jumping and downhill slopes had moved to a new area after World War II, but these proved insufficient. In 1962, the Chisholm Ski Club opened all-new facilities at Black Mountain.

The cross-country trails were designed by Rumford native and two-time Olympian Chummy Broomhall, who also designed the cross country trails for the 1960 Winter Olympics in Squaw Valley, California, and the 1980 Winter Olympics at Lake Placid, New York. They have since held the 1976 NCAA Cross Country Championships, the 1991 US National Biathlon Championships, the 1993 U.S. Masters Cross Country Championships, the 1996 U.S. Junior Olympics, and the United States Ski and Snowboard Association Cross Country National Championships in 1993, 1999, 2003, and 2004.

The downhill area was much more modest, with a single T-bar lift servicing a few trails with a vertical drop of 470 feet (140 m), and did not expand much for many years. In 2003, the ski area was purchased by the Maine Winter Sports Center, and shortly afterwards significant improvements were made. A new double chair was installed in 2003, and a triple chair to the summit was opened in early 2005, increasing the number of trails to 20 and the vertical drop to 1,150 feet (350 m). The day the triple chair to Black's summit opened was a memorable day for many Rumford locals. Legendary Black Mountain skiers such as Pat Lever and Ethan Carter said the day was "probably the most exciting day of my life." A new 13,000 sq ft (1,200 m^{2}) lodge was also built.

In mid-2004 the resort banned tobacco use at the mountain.

In the summer of 2022 Black Mountain of Maine became one of five new mountains on the Indy Pass. Customers that purchase the Indy Pass get 2 days worth of skiing at Black Mountain and the Black Mountain of Maine Nordic Center, with no blackout days.
