= Rumford Point Congregational Church =

Historic church in Maine, United States

- U.S. National Register of Historic Places
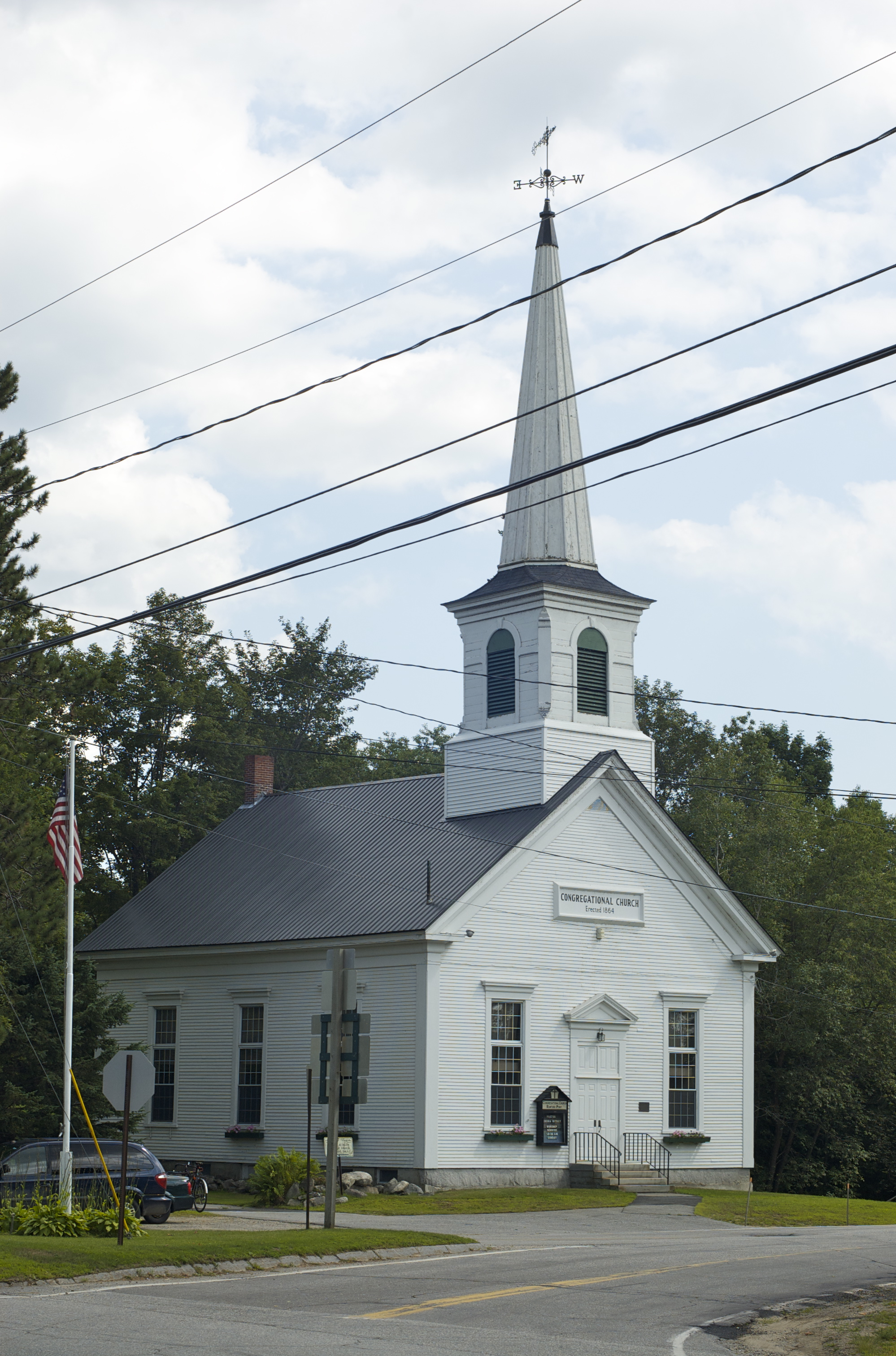

- Location within Maine Location within the United States
- Location: ME 5 and US 2 jct., Rumford, Maine
- Coordinates: 44°30′3″N 70°40′18″W
- Area: 0.5 acres (0.20 ha)
- Built: 1865
- Architect: Jonathan Adams Bartlett
- Architectural style: Greek Revival
- NRHP reference No.: 85001259
- Added to NRHP: June 20, 1985

The Rumford Point Congregational Church is an historic church at the State Route 5 and U.S. Route 2 junction in Rumford, Maine. Built in 1865, the Greek Revival church building is notable as one of a very small number of 19th-century churches in Maine with original Trompe-l'œil artwork on its walls and ceilings. It was listed on the National Register of Historic Places in 1985.

== Description and history ==
The church is located in the historic village of Rumford Point, close to a bridge crossing the Androscoggin River. It is a single-story wood frame structure, with a relatively simple two-stage tower topped by a steeple and weathervane. The main facade is three bays wide, with the entrance at the center, framed by pilasters and a fully pedimented gable, set above decorative panels. The flanking bays, like those on the side walls, have tall sash windows. The first stage of the tower is square, finished in clapboards, while the second stage, which houses the belfry, is flushboarded, and has round-arched louvered openings. The church was built in 1865.

The church's most striking feature is the series of frescoed paintings on its walls and ceilings. Apparently painted by the itinerant artist Jonathan Adams Bartlett, they are among the youngest and rarest such work known in the state from the 19th century. The paintings are a Trompe-l'œil depiction of a domed ceiling, with the walls painted to give the illusion of a much larger choir/apse space. The ceiling art has experienced some water damage.

== See also ==
- National Register of Historic Places listings in Oxford County, Maine
