= Minnesota's Largest Candy Store =

Candy store in Jordan, Minnesota

Coordinates: 44°39′15″N 93°41′06″W

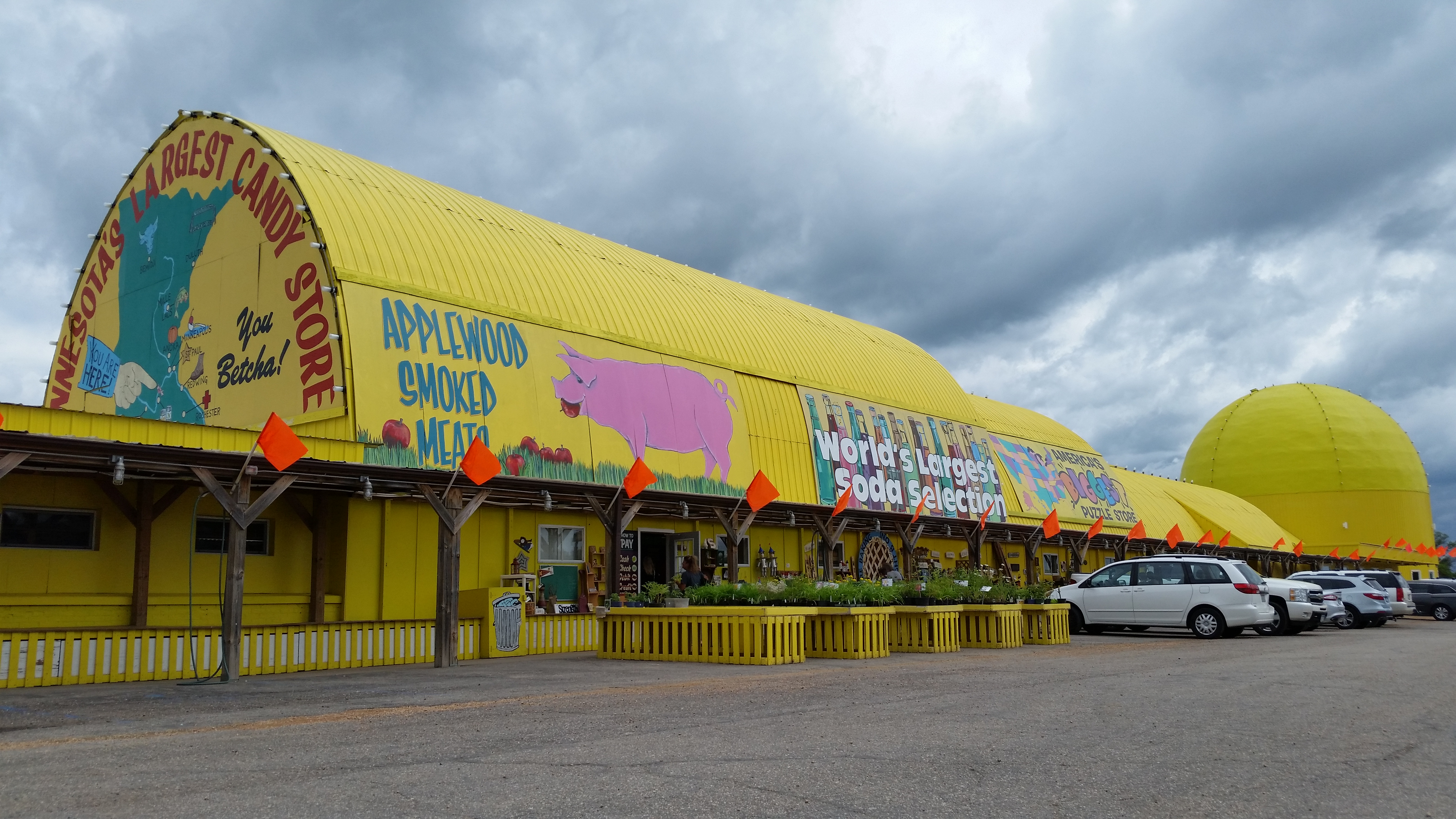
- Minnesota's Largest Candy Store
- Formerly: Jim's Apple Farm
- Type: Privately held company
- Founded: 1960s
- Founder: Herbert R. "Hippy" Wagner
- Headquarters: Jordan, MN, US
- Number of locations: 1
- Products: Candy, baked goods, soda
- Owner: Robert Wagner
- Number of employees: 150
- Website: minnesotaslargestcandystore.business.site

Minnesota's Largest Candy Store is a family-owned candy store along U.S. Route 169 in Jordan, Minnesota. The business is known for its distinctive yellow building, extensive candy selection, pop-culture-themed decor, and puzzle collection. The store closes during the winter months and is cash-only.

== History ==
The store has its roots in Jim's Apple Farm, another Wagner family business, though the land was sold into the Wagner family in 1900. At first, the business focused on selling apples, as the University of Minnesota had invested a great deal in Minnesota's apple industry. The business was successful, but remained relatively small, as travelers would buy apples and pie, and then continue traveling.

At a certain point Robert Wagner decided to begin selling candy as well, mostly focusing on old-fashioned American candies, such as salt-water taffy. This also allowed the business to open earlier and close later in the season. While Robert did not intend the candy to become permanent, his daughter, Christine, pushed him to keep it available. Unlike apples, candy sales grew exponentially.

In the mid-2000s a series of hailstorms devastated three consecutive years' worth of crops. Facing this financial burden, the family decided to rely more on candy sales. The gamble was successful, and the family began investing more heavily in candy, eventually building the yellow barn on the site. The building has been expanded numerous times, most recently to include a planetarium-like dome on its north end.

Later in 2019, following a string of cash register robberies in Scott County, the candy store placed a 16-ton Abbot tank in its parking lot as a tongue-in-cheek deterrent.

The store initially closed during the COVID-19 pandemic, but re-opened as an essential business on May 8, 2020. During this time, it provided free advertising for local restaurants seeking to advertise take-out services.

== Controversies ==
The store has several billboards on its property to attract motorists' attention; some have courted controversey. They have caused controversy in the past. During an April snowstorm in 2018, the store posted a billboard that read "In Only Two Years Trump Fixed Global Warming." While some passing motorists interpreted this as support for Donald Trump, Wagner said the message was intended to "convince [motorists] to stop."

=== Black Lives Matter ===
In October 2015 the store posted a message on a billboard, which read "Join The Movement #caramelapplesmatter." Robert Wagner, the owner of the store, apologized for the message and called it "a mistake."

Five years later, in July 2020, an employee with access to the company Facebook page replied to a message stemming from the original #caramelapplesmatter billboard by insulting the sender and by saying "All Lives Matter." The store first believed it had been hacked, but then revealed that a longtime employee had sent the messages; the employee was fired. The store issued an apology, saying "The...messages by no means reflect the views of the owners or the Jim’s Apple Farm family as a whole" and "[w]e sincerely apologize that this event occurred and are in the process of determining action going forward."

=== Sale of liquor-filled candies to minors ===
On October 27, 2026, Robert Wagner was charged by the state's Alcohol and Gambling Enforcement for selling brandy cherries infused with a liquid center containing 7.3% brandy alongside chocolate with a syrup center containing 3.58% alcohol by volume without having a liquor license or checking identification.
