= Bucky Broomhall =

American skier (1931–2024)

Erlon "Bucky" Broomhall
Personal information
- Nationality: United States
- Born: December 7, 1931 Rumford, Maine, U.S.
- Died: December 29, 2024 (aged 93) Bennington, Vermont, U.S.

Sport
- Sport: Skiing

Erlon F. "Bucky" Broomhall (December 7, 1931 – December 29, 2024) was an American skier, junior olympic ski coach and advocate of youth skiing in the state of Vermont. He was responsible for bringing the first girls' team to the Junior Olympics in 1968.

== Life and career ==
Originally from Rumford, Maine, Broomhall dedicated his career to giving opportunities to young skiers in Southern Vermont. He was the 12th of 15 children, and began skiing early on as a child, following in the footsteps of older brothers Chummy Broomhall, Ray and Charlie (Slim) -- each a member of the Maine Ski Hall of Fame as well. He is a veteran of the Korean War, serving in the United States Navy from 1951 to 1955.

Broomhall attended Western State College in Colorado from 1955–59, where he competed for the ski team for four years. There he concentrated on cross country and jumping competing for four years for the Mountaineers and in 1956 and 1957 helped the team to the NCAA championship. In his final year in 1959 Bucky was 7th in the nation in cross country and in the top 20 in jumping. Based on his performance, he was invited to compete in the 1960 Winter Olympics trials in Squaw Valley, California, where he finished 24th in the event.

Returning to Maine in 1962, he taught and coached at Fryeburg Academy, and still found time to compete in jumping and cross country events, earning first place as the State of Maine Nordic Combined Champion. Two years later, four of his skiers finished in the top 10 in the junior nationals.

In 1966 he and his wife Frances moved to Bennington, Vermont to head a total ski program for kids of all ages, kindergarten through high school. He coached cross country, jumping and downhill, winning 5 Vermont State High School championships and helping at least 25 skiers to the Junior Olympics.

He was one of the first in the nation to coach a girls' team, bringing the first women's team to Junior Olympics in 1968. In 1969, he left his coaching position to start the Torger Tokel League to develop skiers not yet in high school. The Torger Tokel League is now known as the Bill Koch Ski League, the youth ski league of NENSA (the New England Nordic Ski Association).

Broomhall was the Mount Anthony Union High School ski coach in the late 1970s and ‘80s for several years, then again in the early 1990s, where he won back-to-back boys' state championships, sweeping both boys' and girls' titles in the 1991-92 season. He retired from high school coaching with a 210-76 record, winning five state championships. In 2002, Broomhall became an official through the International Ski Federation, chosen as a Technical Delegate for a World Cup event in Lake Placid and to work at the 2002 Winter Olympics in Salt Lake City, Utah.

Broomhall died at a veterans home in Bennington, Vermont, on December 29, 2024, at the age of 93.

== Honors and awards ==
- 2012 Maine Ski Hall of Fame Inductee
- 2009 Vermont Ski and Snowboard Museum Inductee
- 2008 Western State College Hall of Fame Inductee
