= Strathglass Park District =

Historic district in Maine, United States

- U.S. National Register of Historic Places
- U.S. Historic district
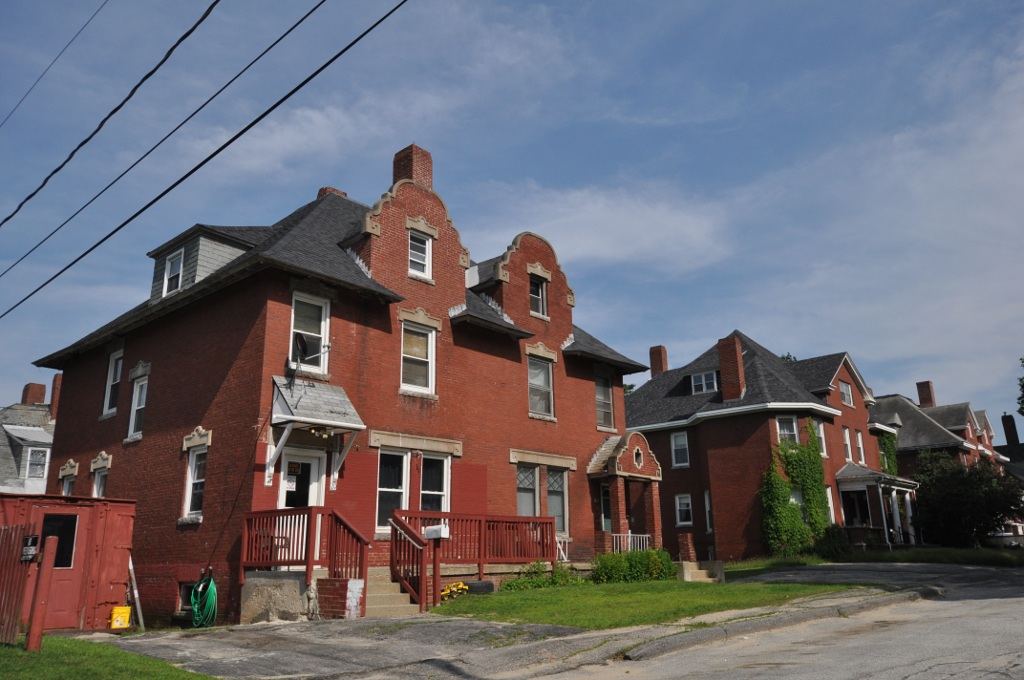

- Location within Maine Location within the United States
- Location: Bounded by Maine Ave., Hancock St., and York St., Rumford, Maine
- Coordinates: 44.55174°N 70.55135°W
- Area: 23 acres (9.3 ha)
- Built: 1902
- Architect: Cass Gilbert; Gay, W. W.
- Architectural style: Shingle
- NRHP reference No.: 74000181
- Added to NRHP: October 18, 1974

The Strathglass Park District, located in Rumford, Maine, encompasses what was once one of the nation's finest early 20th-century mill worker housing complexes. Funded by Hugh J. Chisholm, owner of Rumford's paper mill, and designed by Cass Gilbert, the district originally encompassed a collection of 51 high quality brick duplexes, of 5 similar yet varied syles, which were built in 1901-2 on a series of tree-lined streets, with a small park at the center. As of the district's listing on the National Register of Historic Places in 1974, only one of the Gilbert-designed houses had been completely destroyed and one other suffered fire damage and was converted into a single story building by removing the original roof and upper story. The Rumford Falls Realty Company which had owned and managed the rentals divested itself of the buildings in 1948, with most duplexes being sold to the occupant of longest residency of the two. Soon after and continuing, each half of the duplex was sold off to different owners, ultimately contributing to a lack of collaborative maintenance and eventually creating a look of run-down chaos in the once beautiful housing development.

== Description ==
The Strathglass Park District is located in central Rumford, bounded by Lincoln Avenue, Hancock Street, Maine Avenue, and York Street. The main access to the area is via a stone gate off Maine Avenue, which quickly radiates out into three nearly-parallel streets, which are terminated to the north at Clachan Place. There is a narrow park near the northern end on Lochness Road, the central of the three main roads. All of the houses in this complex are duplexes, built of brick. Stylistically they are essentially variant of the Shingle style, but elements of Queen Anne and Dutch Revival styling are also to be found. The brick was locally manufactured, while the slate for the roofs was brought on from Vermont and Pennsylvania by train.

The walls were built with hollow internal spaces, improving their ability to insulate. The interiors were generously sized, a notable contrast to the cramped quarters often found elsewhere in worker housing. The houses were provided with hardwood floors, working fireplaces, central heating, as well as public water and sewers, and with electricity provided for a nominal fee by Chisholm's Rumford Falls Power Company. The duplexes all were built with very small front and rear entryways consisting of an exterior door entering into a very small room and then another interior door leading into the living quarters at the front, and into the kitchen at the rear. The rear exterior stoops were built as open exposed concrete and brick platforms with steps. However in 1938, a big hurricane traveled up the interior of New England and into the western Maine forests north of Rumford, which were extensively owned by Chisholm's mill and businesses. Thousands of trees were flattened, and in order not to waste this windfall product, much of the wood was milled into lumber, and many of the duplexes had enclosures built over the existing concrete and brick rear stoops from this windfall.

Hugh J. Chisholm began developing his paper works at Rumford in the 1880s. Having seen the condition and poor quality of worker housing in large industrial cities, he decided to attract workers by providing higher-quality accommodations, hiring New York City architect Cass Gilbert to design the buildings. Chisholm named his development "Strathglass", after the Strathglass River in Scotland, which ran near his family's ancestral seat. The street names in the district are also Scottish in origin.

When the houses were ready for occupancy, the company allotted them to employees recommended by their foremen. It only charged minimal rent, to cover operating expenses and amortization. The company provided snow removal services, lawn mowing, and rubbish removal. The company divested itself of the properties in 1948-49, with most of the duplexes purchased by the occupant of longest tenancy.

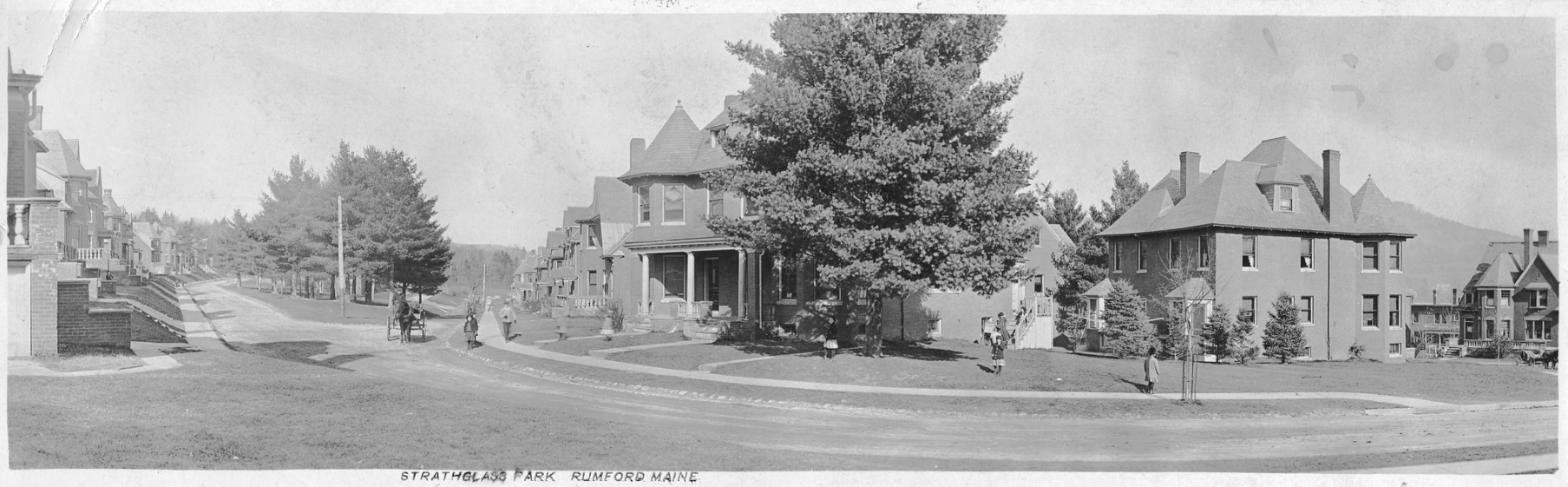
Strathglass Park, Rumford, Maine (around 1910)

== See also ==
- National Register of Historic Places listings in Oxford County, Maine
