= Homeland Security and Emergency Management =

Minnesota Department of Emergency Management (MnDEM) rebranded

- Abbreviation: HSEM

Agency overview
- Formed: 1951
- Preceding agency: Department of Emergency Management (DEM)
- Employees: 68
- Annual budget: $1.851m

Jurisdictional structure
- Operations jurisdiction: Minnesota, U.S.
- Legal jurisdiction: Minnesota
- Governing body: Minnesota Department of Public Safety

Operational structure
- Headquarters: Saint Paul, Minnesota
- Sworn members: 68
- Agency executive: Kristi Rollwagen, Director
- Parent agency: Minnesota Department of Public Safety

Website
- Official Site

The Minnesota Division of Homeland Security and Emergency Management (HSEM) is a division under the Minnesota Department of Public Safety. It was founded in 1951 as the Minnesota Department of Civil Defense, the name was changed after the inception of the United States Department of Homeland Security in 2002. The Division of Homeland Security and Emergency Management helps Minnesotans prevent, prepare for, respond to and recover from disasters and works to keep Minnesota secure from acts of terrorism. As of 2019, the division has 68 full time employees.

== History ==
Minnesota created its Department of Civil Defense in 1951 when C. Elmer Anderson was Minnesota's governor and color television was introduced. Today the division is called Homeland Security and Emergency Management. Since its inception, the way things are done has changed dramatically, but keeping Minnesota ready for disasters whether they are caused by humans or mother nature has remained consistent. In the past 10 years our country has lived through the attacks of September 11, and the force of Hurricane Katrina. Closer to home, Minnesota has experienced 12 presidentially declared major disasters and four emergency declarations including the collapse of the I-35W Mississippi River bridge collapse in downtown Minneapolis.

The financial impact of disasters on communities and individuals can be devastating. HSEM brings in millions of dollars in response, recovery, mitigation and education funding every year.

The radiological emergency planning (REP) division works with Minnesota's two nuclear power plants for evaluation, planning and response, including any hostile action based (HAB) incidents

== Staff ==
=== Administration ===
- Director: Allison Farole (May 2025-Present)
- Deputy Director: Kevin Reed

=== Branch Chiefs ===
- Administration and Grants: Michelle Turbeville
- Preparedness/Recovery/Mitigation: Brian Olson
- Operations and Training: Riley Slimmer

=== Regional Program Coordinators ===
HSEM has six regional program staff assigned throughout the State to assist County and local jurisdictions.

1. (SE) Mike Peterson
2. (NE) Roy Holmes
3. (NW) Heather Winkleblack
4. (WC) Lisa Dumont
5. (SW) Mark Marcy
6. (Metro) Jon Dotterer

HSEM has several divisions that serve public safety in Minnesota

Operations Division

- Cassie Calametti-Operations Chief
- Brad Winger- Operations Officer
- Mark Kam-Operations Officer
- Mike Earp-Operations Officer
- Brian Curtice-Operations Officer
- Jacob Beauregard-Operations Officer
- Andrew Tepfer-Operations Officer
- Nick Radke-Operations Officer

School Safety Division

- Randy Johnson-Director
- Kasey Cable
- Jennifer Larrive
- Jon Jorgensen
- Connie Forster

== HSEM Regions ==
The Minnesota Division of Homeland Security and Emergency Management is divided into six regions with varying characteristics listed below. Population Estimates are based on the 2010 United States census.

Region	Population	Area	Counties	Tribes	City of the First Class
1 (Southeast)	652,818	9,832 Sq. Miles	16	2 Communities	Rochester
2 (Northeast)	463,281	27,683 Sq. Miles	11	5 Nations	Duluth
3 (Northwest)	260,617	18,461 Sq. Miles	14	3 Nations	None
4 (West-Central)	622,623	14,811 Sq. Miles	18	1 Nation	None
5 (Southwest)	275,298	11,923 Sq. Miles	18	2 Communities	None
6 (Metro)	4,029,732	4,322 Sq. Miles	10	Shakopee Mdewakanton Sioux Community	Minneapolis, Saint Paul
