= James C. Frost =

American businessman and politician

- Ambrotype of Frost c. 1857

Sheriff of Anoka County, Minnesota
- In office 1857–1858; 1868–1872; 1874–1884

Member of the Minnesota House of Representatives from the 24th District
- In office December 2, 1857 – December 6, 1859
- Preceded by: Position established
- Succeeded by: R.M. Johnson

Personal details
- Born: November 11, 1816 Rumford, Maine, U.S.
- Died: May 24, 1896 (aged 79) Anoka, Minnesota, U.S.
- Other political affiliations: Democrat

James Crocker Frost (November 11, 1816 – May 24, 1896) was an American businessman, politician, and early settler of Anoka, Minnesota who was the first appointed sheriff of the Anoka County Sheriff's Office and served in the 1st Minnesota Legislature.

== Biography ==
Frost was born on November 11, 1816 in Rumford, Maine.^{:219}^{:481} In his early years Frost moved to Jefferson County, Wisconsin where he lived for fourteen years.^{:481} Frost moved to Minnesota Territory in 1852, originally settling in St. Anthony, Minnesota, before moving to Anoka on September 4, 1853.^{:219} Frost originally worked in the lumber industry in Anoka before working as the land commissioner of the Saint Paul and Pacific Railroad.^{:219}

Shortly after Anoka County, Minnesota was first organized on May 23, 1857 Frost was appointed as the first sheriff of Anoka County on June 30, 1857. Frost served three nonconsecutive terms as the sheriff of Anoka County.

Frost was elected on October 13, 1857 to serve in the Minnesota House of Representatives, representing Minnesota's 24th House district during the 1st Minnesota Legislature. During his term Frost was a member of the banks and incorporations committees. Frost later served as the postmaster of Anoka from June 17, 1857 to March 13, 1858, before being elected as the judge of the Anoka County probate court.^{:219} Throughout his political career Frost identified as a Democrat.^{:219}

Frost died on May 24, 1896 in Anoka.^{:219}
