= Minnesota Bureau of Criminal Apprehension =

US state criminal investigative bureau

- Abbreviation: BCA

Agency overview
- Formed: 1927; 99 years ago
- Employees: 533

Jurisdictional structure
- Operations jurisdiction: Minnesota, U.S.
- Map of Minnesota Bureau of Criminal Apprehension's jurisdiction
- Area: 86,936 square miles (225,160 km^{2})
- Population: 5,576,606 (2017 est.)
- Legal jurisdiction: State of Minnesota

Operational structure
- Headquarters: 1430 Maryland Ave E Saint Paul, MN 55106
- Agency executives: Drew Evans, Superintendent; Diane Bartell; Catherine Knutson; Scott Mueller; Dana Gotz
- Parent agency: Minnesota Department of Public Safety
- Divisions: List of Divisions: Forensic Science Services; Investigative Services; Minnesota Justice Information Services; Administrative Services

Website
- dps.mn.gov

The Minnesota Bureau of Criminal Apprehension (BCA) is a statewide criminal investigative bureau headquartered in Saint Paul that provides expert forensic science and criminal investigation services. The BCA assists local Minnesota law enforcement agencies with complex investigations using the latest technology and techniques, and helps secure arrests for violence-related and drug-trafficking crimes, among others. Notably, the BCA investigates killings by police and similar incidents.

The BCA operates as a subsidiary division of the Minnesota Department of Public Safety, a major state agency of the Minnesota Executive Branch. The BCA's superintendent is Drew Evans.

== History ==
The Bureau of Criminal Apprehension (BCA) was created by the Minnesota Legislature in 1927 to assist police departments statewide in solving crimes and apprehending criminals, under the direction of the Minnesota Attorney General's office. The BCA gathers crime statistics to help state and local agencies identify criminal trends. In 1935, agents received full police power and were licensed police officers throughout the state. In 1947, the BCA Crime Lab was established in St. Paul to assist in solving crimes via forensic science, and was one of the first DNA laboratories in the United States in 1990. Later the BCA was the first law enforcement agency in the U.S. to identify a suspect solely by DNA. In 1969, the agency was moved under the direction of the State Attorney General's Office to the Minnesota Department of Public Safety. In 2001, the BCA opened an additional forensic laboratory in Bemidji, and the BCA's Special Investigations Unit began collaborating with federal agencies to aid in multi-jurisdictional criminal investigations. In 2004, the BCA became one of four laboratories in the U.S. the Federal Bureau of Investigation selected to serve as a regional mitochondrial DNA laboratory.

== Divisions ==
=== Forensic Science Services ===
The BCA Forensic Science Services (FSS) provides forensic science expertise to law enforcement agencies statewide and to the FBI. This includes crime scene processing, digital and multimedia evidence collection, DNA collection and processing, forensic firearm examination, fingerprint identification, toxicology, trace evidence, breath alcohol instrument calibration, and chemical testing.

=== Investigative Division ===
The Investigative Division provides criminal investigative assistance to law enforcement agencies statewide. BCA agents and analysts are positioned in two regional offices in St. Paul and Bemidji, along with 11 field offices located in Alexandria, Brainerd, Duluth, Grand Rapids, Mankato, Marshall, Moorhead, Rochester, Roseau, St. Cloud and Willmar. Services include crime scene investigations, cold case assistance, human trafficking investigations, predatory offender investigations, use-of-force and conflict investigations, and special operations.

=== Minnesota Justice Information Services (MNJIS) ===
The Minnesota Justice Information Services (MNJIS), manages information between sources of criminal justice data for law enforcement agencies and criminal investigation agencies to help solve crimes via statistics and analysis.

=== Professional Services ===
Professional Services provides training to law enforcement and investigation agencies to assist in crime scene investigation and investigation of crimes. In addition, assists in missing persons and the State's Amber alert system.

== Line of duty deaths ==
As of 2025, one member of the BCA has been killed in the line of duty.

== See also ==
- Forensic science
- DNA profiling
- Crime scene
- Forensic data analysis
- Expert witness
- Minnesota State Patrol
- Minnesota Department of Public Safety
- Federal Bureau of Investigation
