= Robert W. Pidacks =

American cross-country skier (1929–1999)

Robert Walter Pidacks (January 28, 1929 – March 28, 1999) was an American cross-country skier who competed in the 1950s. He finished 72nd in the 18 km event at the 1952 Winter Olympics in Oslo.

He died in Saint Petersburg, Florida.

== Early life and education ==
Pidacks was born to Lithuanian immigrants Stanislava Urbonquicke and Stanislovas Puidokas in Rumford, Maine, on January 28, 1927. His brother, Charles, and sister, Sophia, were also born in Rumford. Pidacks graduated from the University of Maine at Orono in 1951. Robert also served in the Korean War. Pidacks married Ruth Edith Gile, daughter of Florence Amelia Giffin and Carroll Hershel Gile, on December 19, 1955. They had five children: Heidi Marie, Karen Marit, Tanya Lee, Robert Stanley, and Holly Erica. Ruth had two daughters from a previous marriage, Daphne Amelia and Gretchen Elizabeth.

== Career ==
Pidacks worked at the Bosie Cascade Paper Mill. Pidacks was a member of the Chisholm Ski Club. In 1990, Pidacks was inducted into the University of Maine All-Time Hall of Fame.

== Personal life and death ==
After retiring, Pidacks moved to St. Pete Beach, Florida. Pidacks died March 28, 1999. His memorial service was at the Pass-a-Grille Beach Community Church and his remains were cremated.

== Honors and awards ==
In 2005, Pidacks was inducted into the Maine Ski Hall of Fame. His wife accepted the award.

"Robert Pidacks was the second Olympic skier from Maine; he skied in the 1952 Oslo Games, despite an eye injury from his ski pole that occurred while competing at Gould Academy in 1946. Pidacks was a three-letter man and ski team captain at the University of Maine." - “Maine Ski Legends in Hall of Fame” published November 27, 2005
