= Minnesota Alcohol and Gambling Enforcement Division =

Department overview
- Formed: 1996; 30 years ago
- Preceding agencies: Minnesota Division of Liquor Control; Minnesota Division of Gambling Enforcement
- Jurisdiction: Minnesota
- Headquarters: St. Paul
- Employees: 19 full-time positions, including: seven sworn agents (director, senior special agent, and five special agents); three (non-sworn) special (liquor) investigators; one law enforcement liaison and six administrative personnel.
- Department executive: Carla Cincotta, Director
- Parent department: Minnesota Department of Public Safety
- Website: dps.mn.gov/divisions/age/Pages/default.aspx

The Minnesota Alcohol and Gambling Enforcement Division (AGED) is a law enforcement agency within the Minnesota Department of Public Safety charged with regulation of alcoholic beverages and gambling, within the U.S. state of Minnesota.

The Alcohol Enforcement Unit issues alcohol manufacturing and wholesale licenses, and approval of some retail licenses. In addition agents investigate compliance with state alcohol laws and regulations, and investigate alcohol-related complaints. The Gambling Enforcement Unit conducts criminal and gaming license background investigations, and monitors the 18 tribal casinos in the state for compliance with the state-tribal compacts. Special investigators conduct inspection and compliance visits to licensed liquor and gambling establishments to ensure compliance with the state liquor and gambling laws and rules.

== See also ==
- Bureau of Alcohol, Tobacco, Firearms and Explosives
