= Minnesota Department of Public Safety =

Services related to the safety and convenience of citizens

Department overview
- Headquarters: Saint Paul, Minnesota
- Employees: 1,855
- Annual budget: $608.6m
- Department executives: Bob Jacobson, Commissioner; Cassandra O'Hern, Deputy Commissioner; T. John Cunningham, Assistant Commissioner of Emergency Services; Tim Lynaugh, Assistant Commissioner of Programs; Jordan Haltaufderheid, Chief of Staff
- Website: www.dps.mn.gov

The Minnesota Department of Public Safety (DPS) is a department of the State of Minnesota in the United States. DPS is an enforcement, licensing and services agency that develops and operates programs in the areas of law enforcement, traffic safety, alcohol and gambling, fire safety, driver licensing, vehicle registration, emergency management and public safety information. The department coordinates the functions and services of the state relating to the safety and convenience of its citizens.

== History ==
The Minnesota Department of Public Safety was established in 1969 per Minnesota Statute 299a. The State Highway Patrol and Drivers License Bureau, both formerly a part of the Minnesota Highway Department, were transferred to DPS in 1970.

The Minnesota Department of Public Safety is a large and complex agency dedicated to prevention, preparedness, response, recovery, enforcement and education.

The various divisions serve Minnesotans with programs in:

- Law enforcement
- Fire code development, fire investigation and safety inspection
- Forensic science
- Crime and fraud prevention
- Crime victims' services
- Homeland security and emergency management
- Emergency communications network management
- Traffic and motorcycle safety
- Driver licensing and vehicle registration
- Alcohol and gambling enforcement
- Pipeline safety and rule enforcement
- Public safety education

=== Commissioner of Public Safety ===
The department is led by the Commissioner of Public Safety, who is appointed by and reports directly to the Governor of Minnesota. Below is a list of the Public Safety Commissioners since it was formed:

1. Jan 1970–Dec 1973: Wallace Hoaglund (1910–1995)
2. June 1974–May 1979: Edward Novak (1917–2002)
3. May 1979–Sep 1982: John Sopsic (1940–2013)
4. Sep 1982–Dec 1982: Kenneth Dirkzwager (1919–2014)
5. Jan 1983–Jan 1991: Paul Tschida
6. Jan 1991–Oct 1991: Ralph Church
7. Oct 1991–Dec 1992: Thomas Frost
8. Dec 1992–Apr 1996: Michael Jordan
9. Apr 1996–Dec 1998: Don Davis
10. Jan 1999–Nov 2002: Charlie Weaver (1957-)
11. Jan 2003–Apr 2004: Rich Stanek (1962-)
12. Apr 2004–Feb 2011: Michael Campion
13. Mar 2011–Jan 2019: Mona Dohman (1962-)
14. Jan 2019–Jan 2023: John Harrington
15. Jan 2023–present: Bob Jacobson

== Divisions ==
- Alcohol and Gambling Enforcement
- Bureau of Criminal Apprehension
- Commissioner's Office
- Driver and Vehicle Services (DVS)
- Emergency Communication Networks
- Fiscal and Administrative Services
- Homeland Security and Emergency Management (HSEM)
- Human Resources
- Office of Communications
- Office of Justice Programs
- Office of Pipeline Safety
- Office of Traffic Safety
- State Fire Marshal
- Minnesota State Patrol

== Agency leadership ==
- Commissioner, Bob Jacobson
- Cassandra O'Hern, Deputy Commissioner
- T. John Cunningham, Assistant Commissioner of Emergency Services
- Tim Lynaugh Assistant Commissioner of Programs
- Jordan Haltaufderheid, Chief of Staff
