= Minnesota State Patrol =

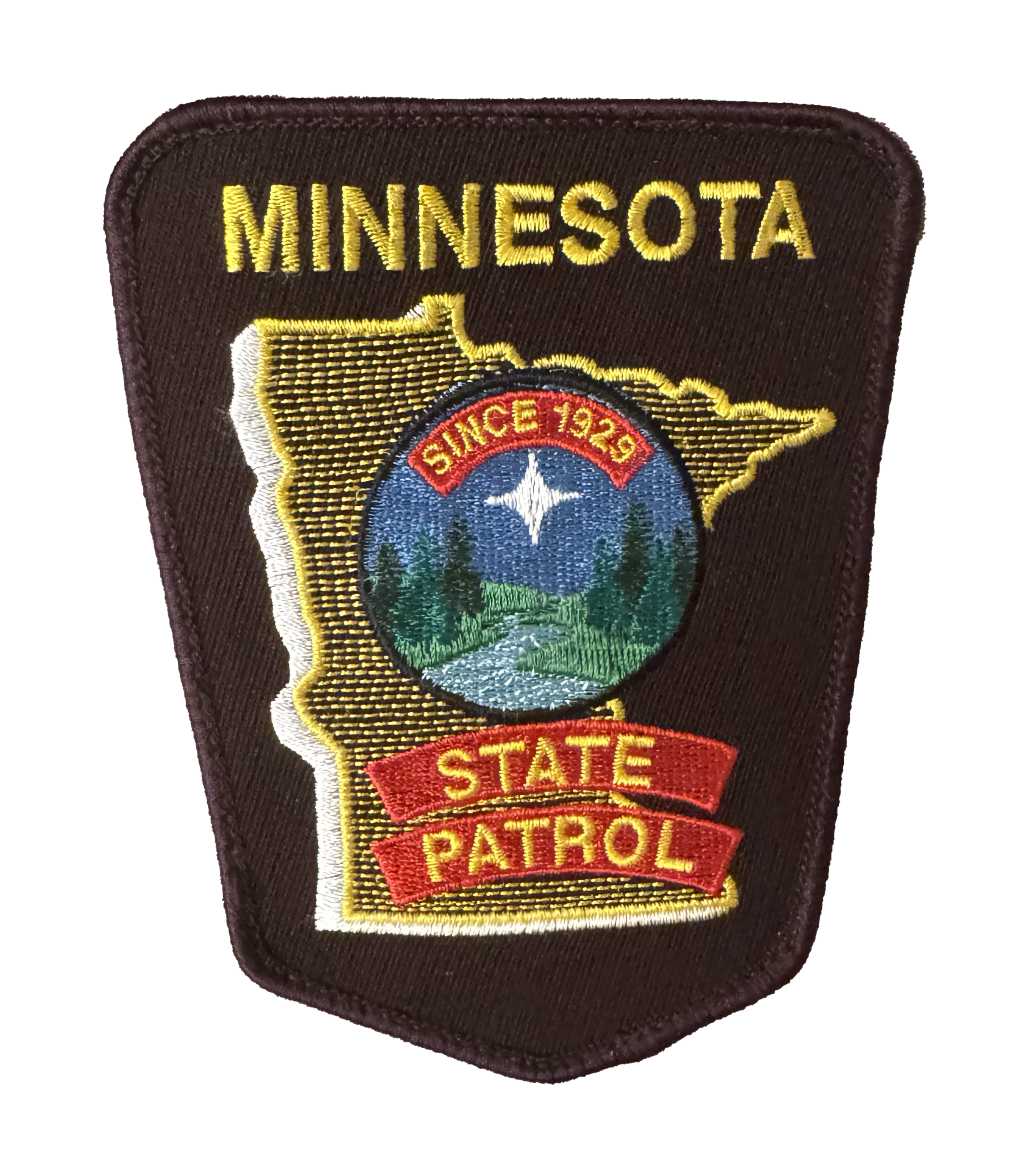
- Official Patch of the Minnesota State Patrol

- Minnesota Department of Public Safety Logo

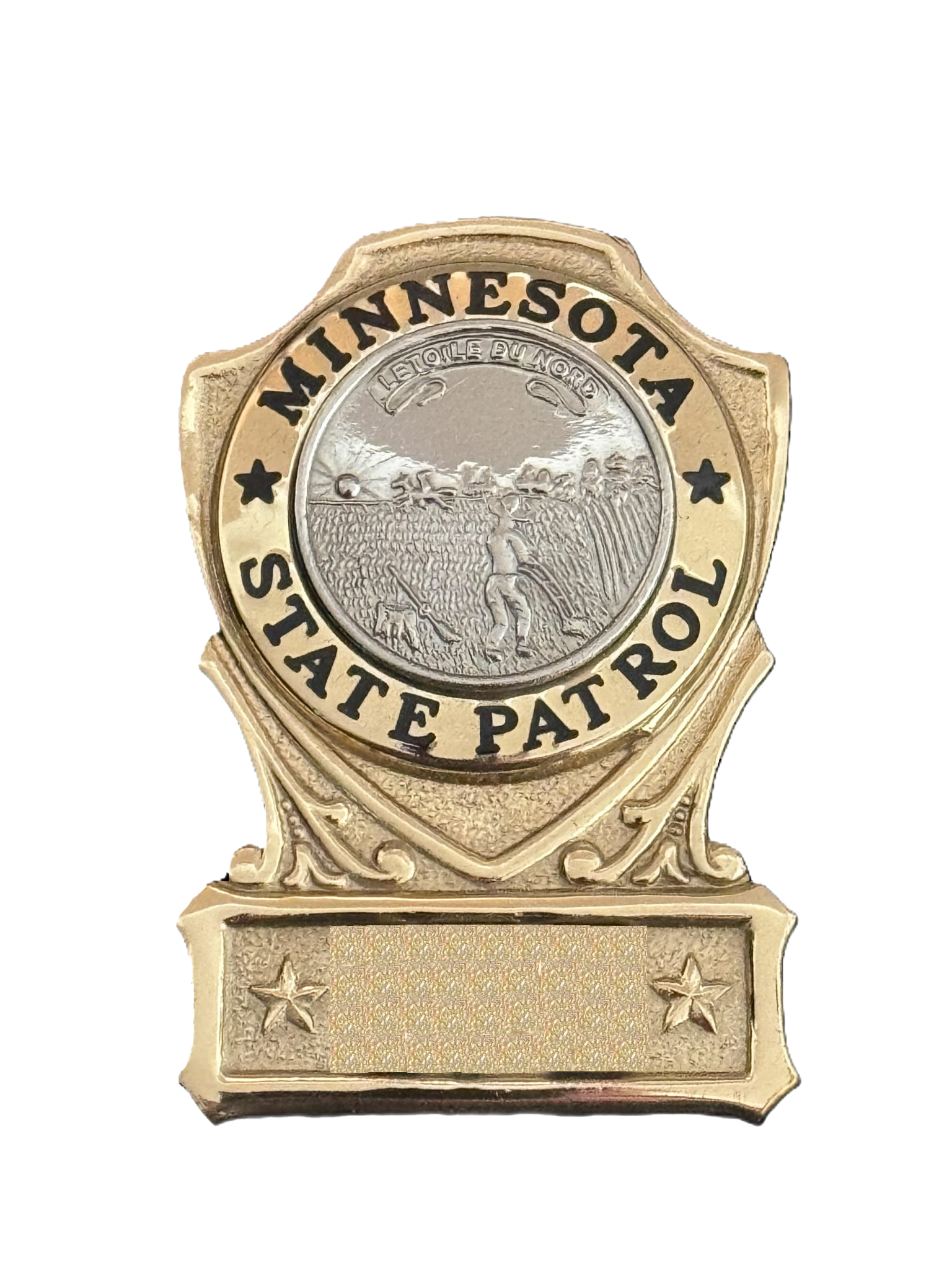
- Badge 1974-2025
- Abbreviation: MSP

Agency overview
- Formed: 1929; 97 years ago
- Preceding agency: Minnesota Highway Patrol (1929–1973)
- Employees: 886 (as of 2017)

Jurisdictional structure
- Operations jurisdiction: State of Minnesota, United States
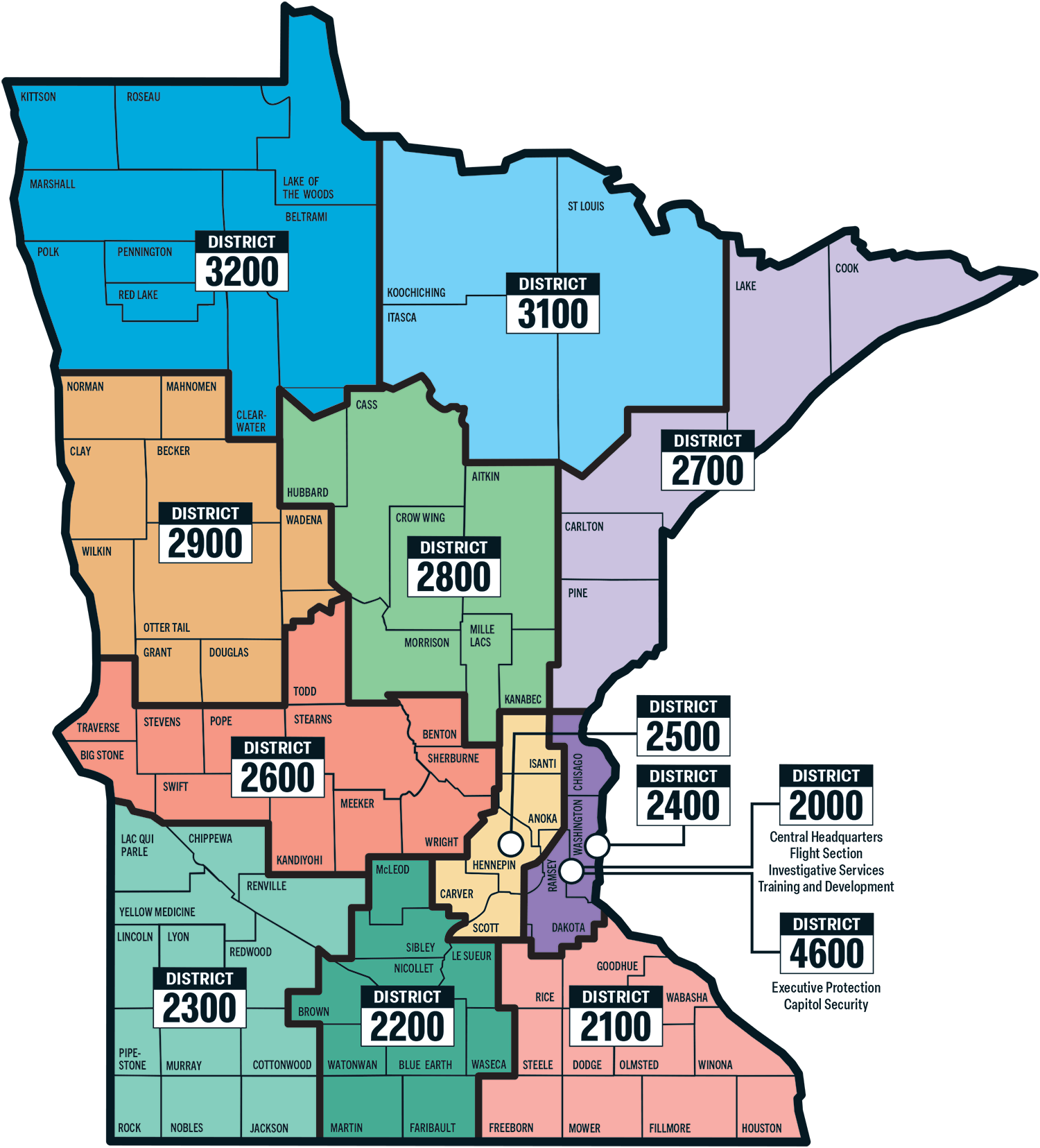
- Minnesota State Patrol Districts
- Area: 87,014 square miles (225,370 km^{2})
- Population: 5,842,388 (2024 est.)
- General nature: Civilian police

Operational structure
- Headquarters: St. Paul, Minnesota
- Troopers: 654 (as of July 2026)
- Civilian employees: 295 (as of 2017)
- Agency executives: Colonel Christina Bogojevic, Chief of the State Patrol; Lt. Colonel Jeremy Geiger, Assistant Chief of the State Patrol
- Parent agency: Minnesota Department of Public Safety
- Patrol Districts: 11

Facilities
- Stations: 61
- Helicopters: 3
- Airplanes: 4
- Dogs: 16

Website
- Minnesota State Patrol

The Minnesota State Patrol is the primary state patrol agency for Minnesota and serves as the de facto state police for the state. While Minnesota State Patrol troopers have full powers of arrest throughout the state, their primary function is traffic safety and vehicle law enforcement. The State Patrol is a division of the Minnesota Department of Public Safety.

== History ==
The Minnesota Highway Patrol was created in 1929 when Charles M. Babcock, the Commissioner of Highways, appointed Earle Brown, Sheriff of Hennepin County, as Chief of the Highway Patrol. On July 1, 1929, Chief Brown appointed 8 officers. In 1973, the Highway Patrol was reorganized and the official name was changed to the Minnesota State Patrol.

The first training school was held January 18 to April 1, 1930. This school graduated the first 35 members of the Minnesota Highway Patrol.

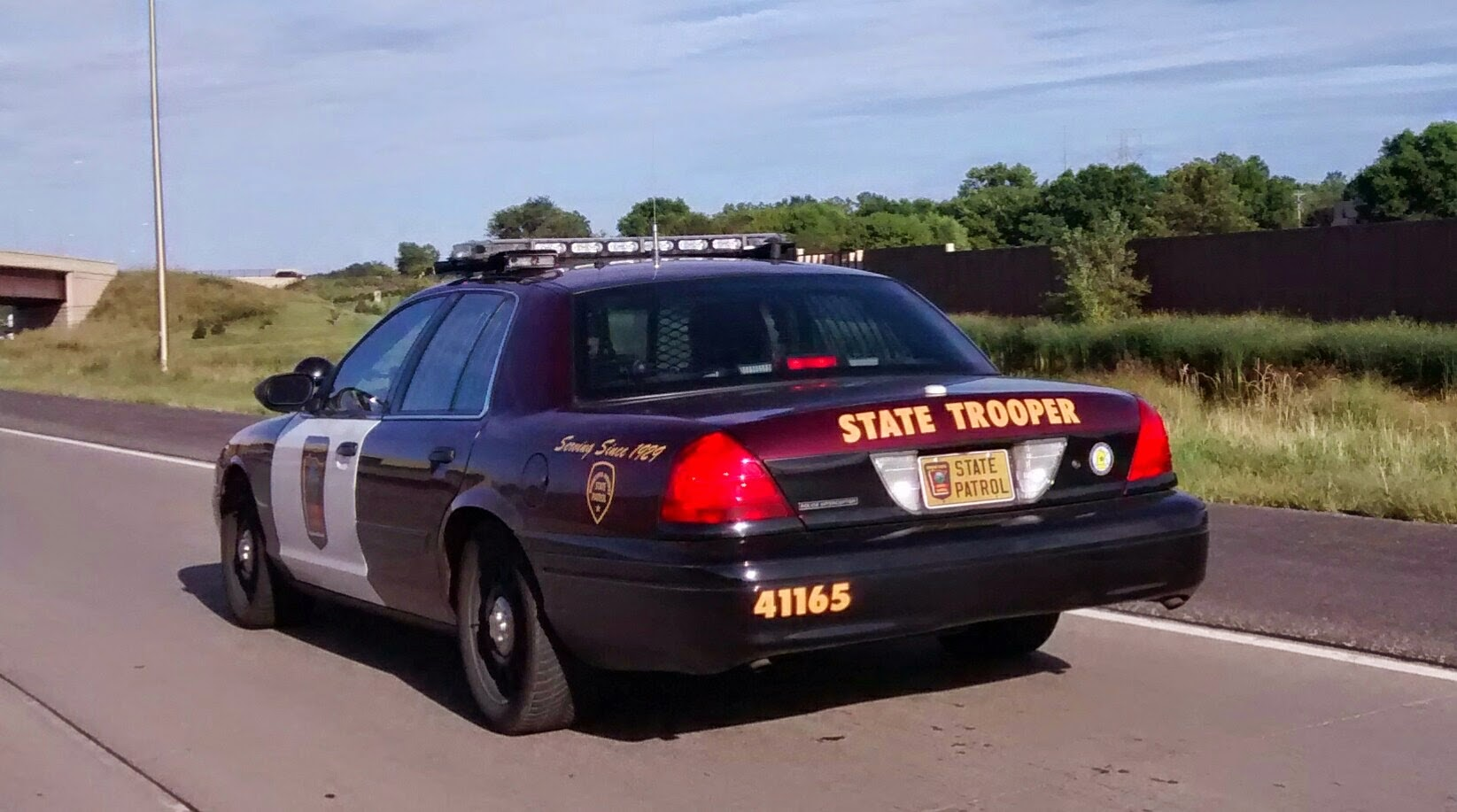
Minnesota State Patrol 2011 Ford Crown Victoria Police Interceptor

The mission of the Minnesota State Patrol is "to protect and serve all people in the state through assistance, education, and enforcement; provide support to allied agencies; and provide for the safe, efficient movement of traffic on Minnesota's roadways." The Minnesota State Patrol strives to achieve their mission while following their "core values" of respect, integrity, courage, honor, and excellence. These core values are taught to new cadets on the first day of the academy and are stressed throughout employment.

=== The patch ===
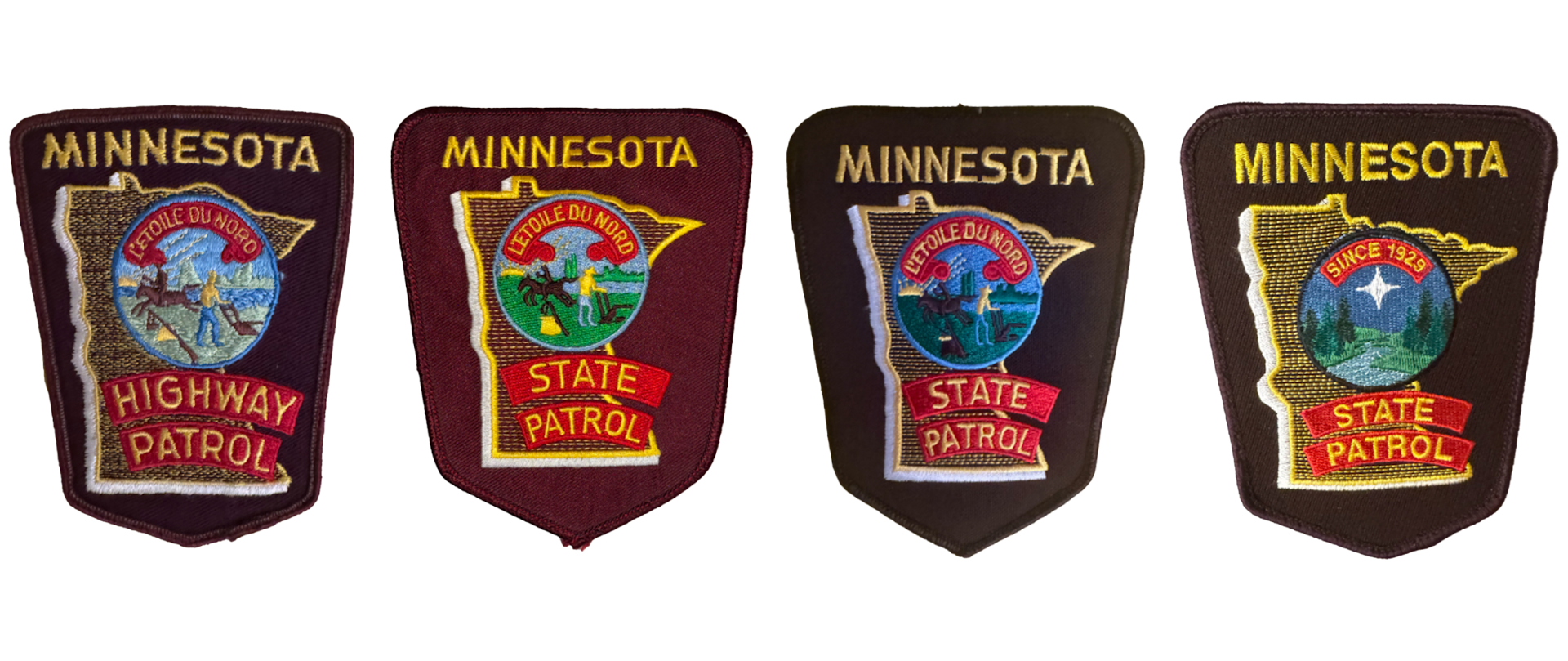
The progression of the modern patch from the mid-1950s to the most recent version implemented in 2025.

The previous version of the modern patch worn by members of the Minnesota State Patrol evolved from "The Great Seal" which was placed on all official state documents. In August 2024, the State Patrol announced an updated logo design for their patches and badges. This was due to the State of Minnesota replacing their state seal and state flag in May of 2024. Instead of using the new state seal featuring the Common Loon (the state bird), the State Patrol designed their own center seal and kept the rest of their previously used designs largely the same.

The new State Patrol seal consists of the Mississippi River, seven Norway Pines (the state tree) to represent troopers working seven days a week, a four-point North Star (also on the new state seal), and a banner which reads "Since 1929" across the top acknowledging the birth year of the agency. The State Patrol began updating logos and license plates on squad cars first, and then troopers began wearing the new patches and badges in April 2025. The State Patrol's chief, Colonel Christina Bogojevic, estimated there were 188,000 agency items that needed to be switched over to the new logo. The cost of this changeover was estimated to be approximately $4,000,000.

=== Notable incidents ===
In late May 2020, the Minnesota State Patrol was involved in policing the George Floyd protests in Minneapolis–Saint Paul. The State Patrol slashed tires of at least several dozen unoccupied vehicles parked near protests, admitting their involvement around a week later. Several journalists' cars, including from the Star Tribune, had their tires slashed. The Patrol said that the tactic was not a usual one, but they implemented it to prevent vehicles from being used as weapons.

== Duties ==
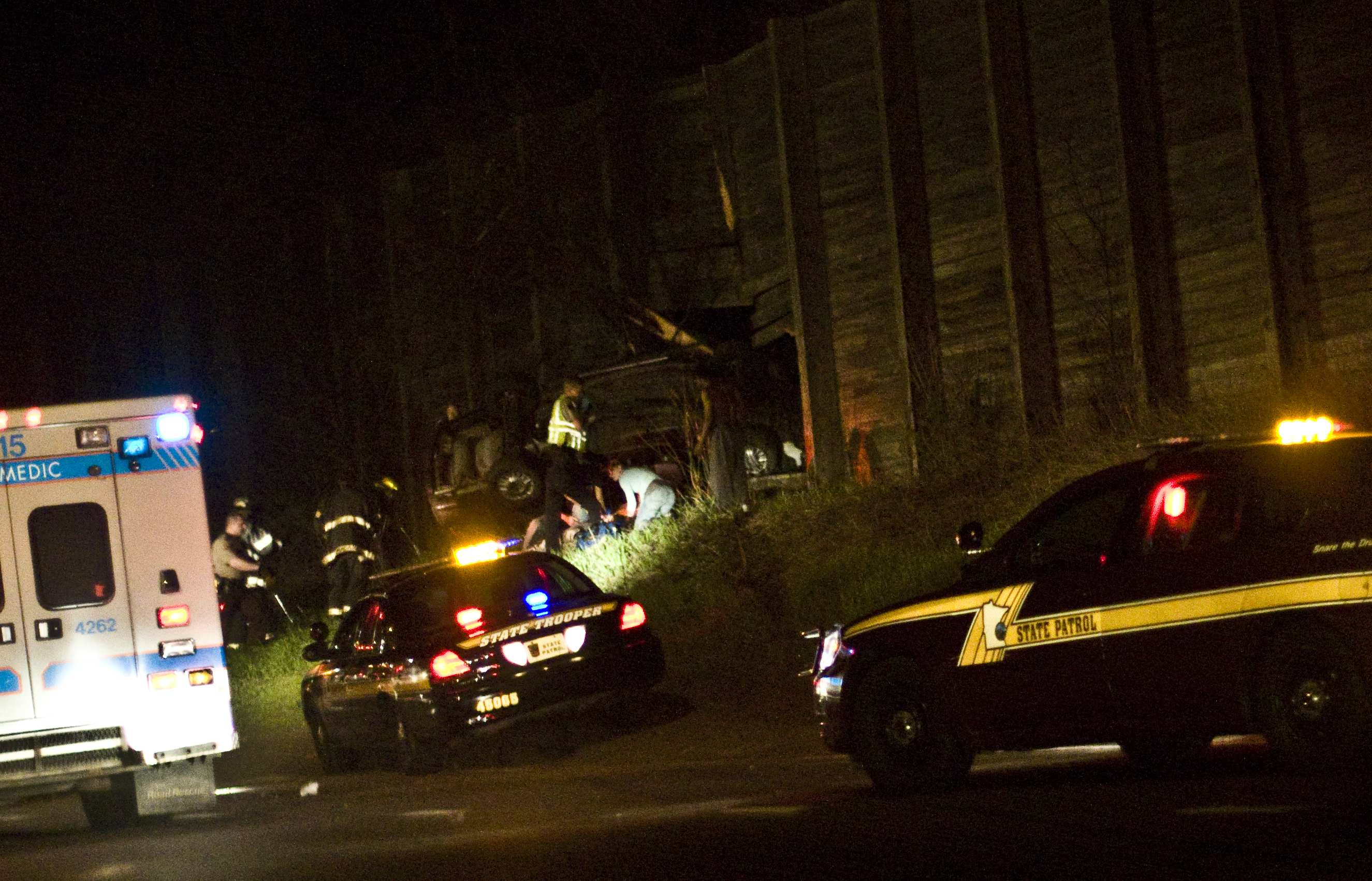
Troopers at the scene of a crash on Interstate 94 in 2008

While the State Patrol concentrates primarily on traffic enforcement, impaired driving investigations, crash response, and other highway safety duties, it also has a statewide law enforcement role. Troopers will often respond to requests for assistance from local city and county law enforcement agencies during higher risk situations or when those agencies do not have adequate staffing to respond to a particular situation. Troopers are also involved with crash reconstruction, vehicle crimes investigations, and commercial vehicle enforcement. The State Patrol capitol security division also handles the security for the Minnesota State Capitol complex and the Governor. This includes a combination of state troopers and non-sworn capitol security officers.

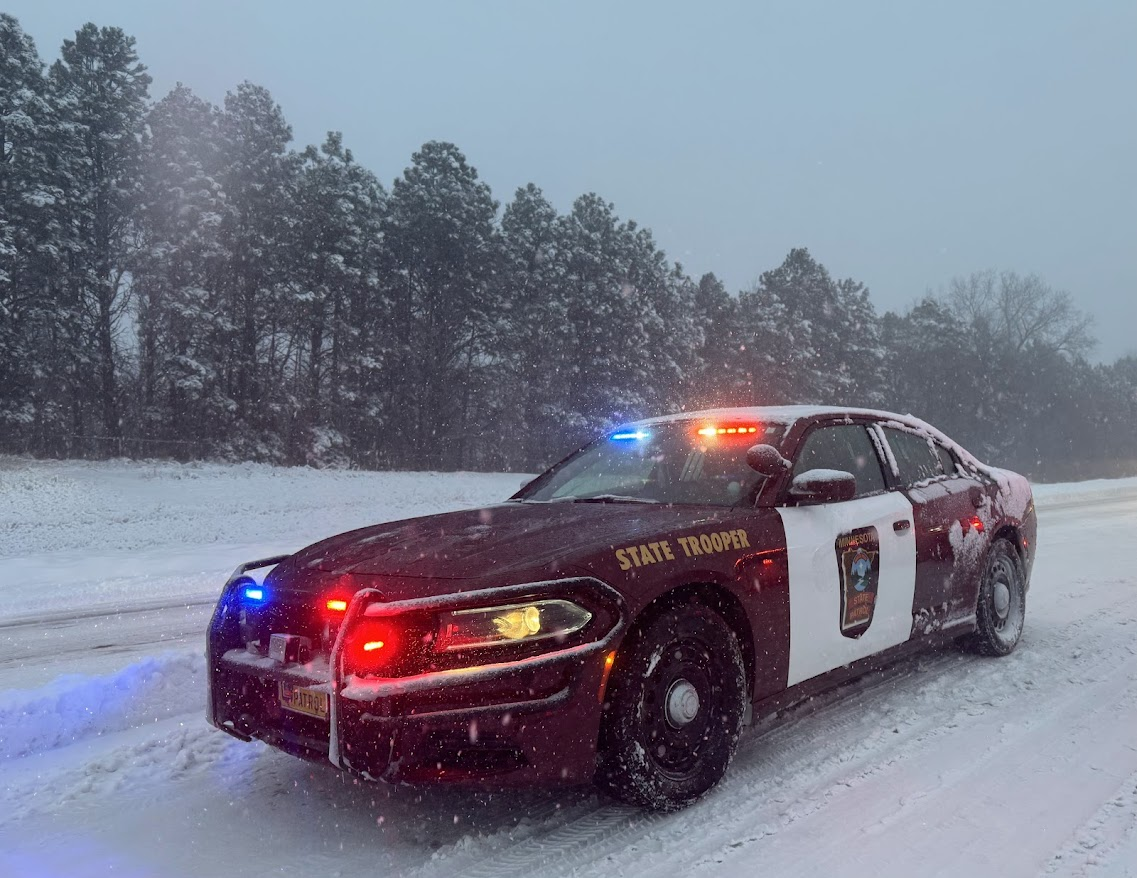
Minnesota State Patrol 2022 Dodge Charger Pursuit

Additionally, the State Patrol maintains a K-9 unit that focuses on drug enforcement interdiction, a mobile response team (MRT) used for crowd control situations or extra security for public events, as well as a Special Response Team (SRT), that operates like a traditional SWAT Team. Troopers were previously issued the Glock 17 Gen 5 9mm sidearm equipped with a Streamlight TLR-7 weapon mounted light. In 2026, a new sidearm was issued: the Glock 45 chambered in 9mm with red dot sight (RDS) capability. The Patrol retained the use of the TLR-7.

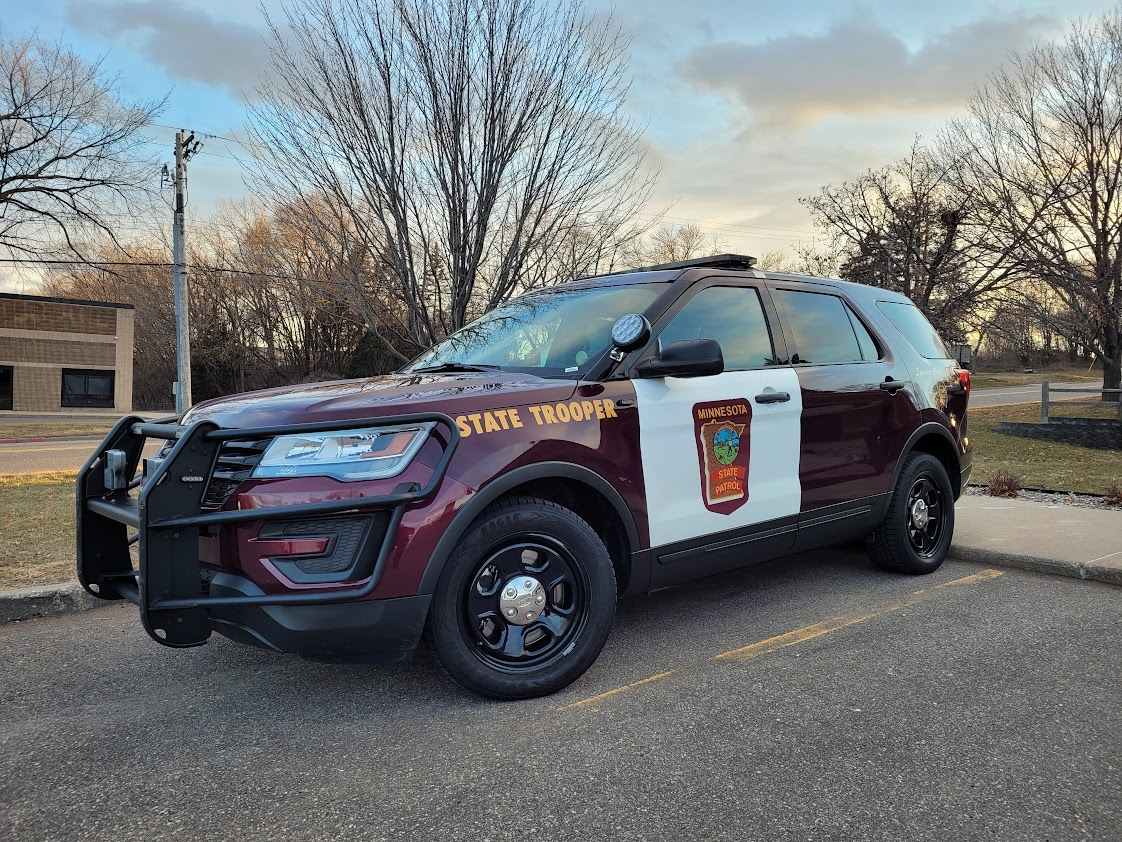
Minnesota State Patrol 2019 Ford Police Interceptor Utility (Explorer)

The Minnesota State Patrol also prides itself on the capabilities of its flight section, which employs 13 state trooper pilots and seven aircraft. They are based out of airports in two different cities, St. Paul and Brainerd. MSP utilizes aircraft (airplanes and helicopters) to assist with various missions. These missions include conducting search and rescue operations, mitigating vehicle pursuits, locating missing people or criminal suspects on foot, participating in traffic enforcement, monitoring public events for safety issues, and conducting emergency blood runs to hospitals. The Minnesota Air Rescue Team (MART) is a combination of State Patrol trooper pilots and St. Paul Fire Department firefighters that respond across Minnesota to conduct helicopter rescues in areas that are difficult to reach by other means. Similarly, MSP's Special Response Team (SRT) has members trained to conduct tactical operations using the helicopters.

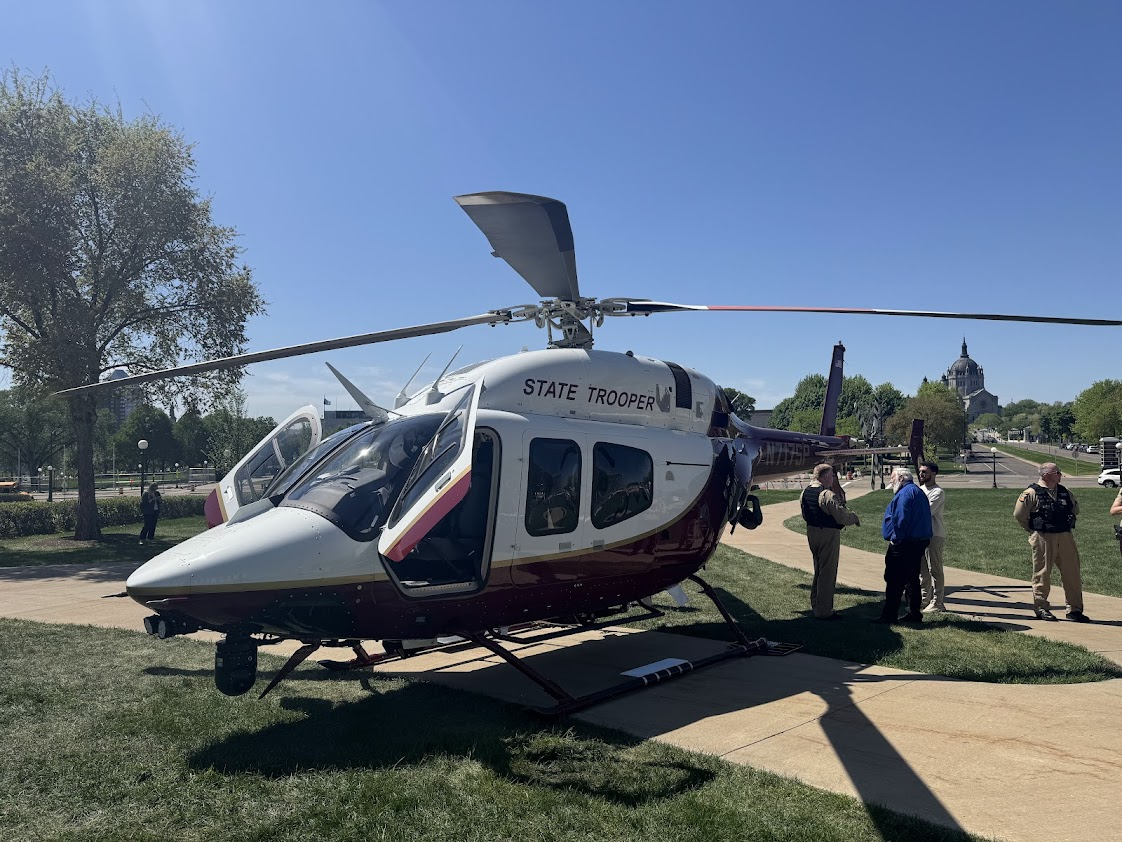
MSP Bell 429 Helicopter

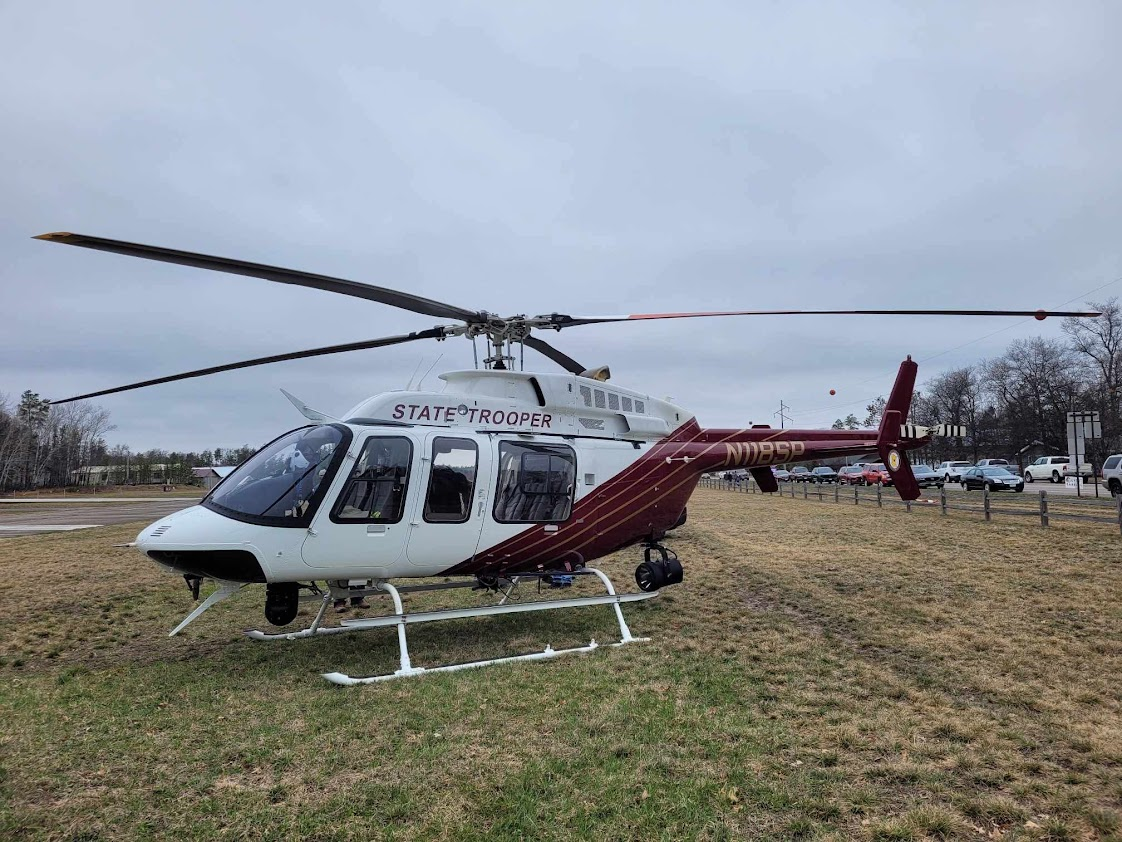
MSP Bell 407 Helicopter

In June 2025 a new aircraft was introduced to the fleet, a Bell 429 helicopter. This helicopter includes twin engines to allow more flexibility if one goes down, advanced auto-pilot to decrease pilot workload, a side-mounted hoist system to conduct quicker rescues, radios to connect pilots to personnel on the ground, infrared cameras for thermal imaging and video streaming, and a spotlight to illuminate the surrounding area at night. MSP also operates two older Bell 407 helicopters along with two Cirrus S22 fixed-wing airplanes and two Cessna 182 fixed-wing airplanes. These airplanes are equipped with cameras and other equipment to aid in various State Patrol aviation missions. Trooper pilots also utilize night-vision goggles to enhance eye-sight capabilities in the dark and are required to maintain both a Federal Aviation Administration (FAA) commercial license and a second class airman's medical certification. The Minnesota State Patrol is the only law enforcement agency in Minnesota or its surrounding states (Iowa, North Dakota, South Dakota, and Wisconsin) that owns and staffs helicopter resources on a full-time basis. The surrounding states only used contracted helicopters on occasion or operate their own fixed-wing airplanes.

== Organization ==
The State Patrol is currently headquartered in St. Paul. There are 11 Patrol Districts throughout the state, divided into 61 Patrol Stations. The current Chief of the State Patrol is Colonel Christina Bogojevic and the current Assistant Chief of the State Patrol is Lieutenant Colonel Jeremy Geiger. Each district office is led by a captain and is staffed with lieutenants, investigators, and troopers, along with communication and support staff to assist in the patrol's missions. The Headquarters and State Patrol Command Staff are within District 2000, along with the Flight Section, Investigative Services Section, and Training & Development.

On June 30th, 2025, the Minnesota State Patrol bought property in the 1500 block of Highway 36 in Roseville for $13,400,000. There are currently two buildings on this land (one previously used by the Minnesota Department of Education and one previously used by National American University). Both buildings have been unused for several years. MSP plans to demolish these buildings in 2026 and begin construction on a new metropolitan headquarters. This will be the first building in history actually owned by MSP, as the Patrol has (up until now) only leased space from the Minnesota Department of Transportation (DOT) and other entities for their troopers to use. This new headquarters will consolidate six metropolitan locations into one, including: central headquarters currently in Saint Paul, the east metro district office currently in Oakdale, the west metro district office currently in Golden Valley, the commercial vehicle district office currently in Mendota Heights, the investigative services section currently in Golden Valley, and the training and development section currently in Shoreview. This new headquarters will be home to about 300 MSP personnel and will host troopers from across the state to do training and receive other support. The anticipated completion of this project is May of 2028.

=== Patrol Districts ===
Patrol District	District Office	Station Offices	Counties (or area) served
District 2000	Headquarters - St. Paul		All (statewide): State Patrol Headquarters; Flight Section; Investigative Services; Training and Development
District 2100	Rochester	Albert Lea, Owatonna, Red Wing, Rushford, Wabasha, Winona	Dodge, Fillmore, Freeborn, Goodhue, Houston, Mower, Olmsted, Rice, Steele, Wabasha, and Winona
District 2200	Mankato	Fairmont, Hutchinson, New Ulm	Blue Earth, Brown, Faribault, Le Sueur, Martin, McLeod, Nicollet, Sibley, Waseca, and Watonwan
District 2300	Marshall	Marshall, Montevideo, Redwood Falls, Pipestone, Windom, Worthington	Chippewa, Cottonwood, Jackson, Lac qui Parle, Lincoln, Lyon, Murray, Nobles, Pipestone, Redwood, Renville, Rock, and Yellow Medicine
District 2400	Oakdale (East Metro)	Forest Lake, Lakeland, Richfield, South St. Paul, St. Paul.	Chisago, Dakota, Hennepin (part), Ramsey (part), Scott (part), and Washington
District 2500	Golden Valley (West Metro)	Cambridge, Chaska, Eden Prairie, Minnetonka, Maple Grove, Minneapolis, Mounds View.	Anoka, Carver, Hennepin (part), Isanti, Ramsey (part), and Scott (part)
District 2600	St. Cloud	Buffalo, Elk River, Morris, Sauk Centre, St. Cloud, Wilmar	Benton, Big Stone, Kandiyohi, Meeker, Pope, Sherburne, Stearns, Stevens, Swift, Todd (part), Traverse, and Wright
District 2700	Duluth	Duluth, Grand Marais, Hinckley, Scanlon, Two Harbors	Carlton, Cook, Lake, Pine, and St. Louis (part)
District 2800	Brainerd	Aitkin, Brainerd, Little Falls, Mora, Walker	Aitkin, Cass, Crow Wing, Hubbard (part), Kanabec, Mille Lacs, and Morrison
District 2900	Detroit Lakes	Alexandria, Fergus Falls, Mahnomen, Moorhead, Wadena	Becker, Clay, Douglas, Grant, Mahnomen, Norman, Otter Tail, Todd (part), Wadena, and Wilkin
District 3100	Virginia	Virginia, Grand Rapids, Hibbing, International Falls	Itasca, Koochiching, and St. Louis (part)
District 3200	Thief River Falls	Bagley, Bemidji, Crookston, Hallock, Roseau	Beltrami, Clearwater, Hubbard (part), Kittson, Lake of the Woods, Marshall, Pennington, Polk, Red Lake, and Roseau
District 4600	Capitol Security & Executive Protection	St. Paul	Minnesota State Capitol complex & grounds, Minnesota Governor's Residence, Protection of the Governor of Minnesota and other state executives and officials as needed
District 4700	Commercial Vehicle Enforcement	Mendota Heights	All (statewide), enforce laws pertaining to motor carriers and Commercial vehicles by performing Commercial Vehicle Inspections and operating statewide scales

=== State Patrol Chief ===
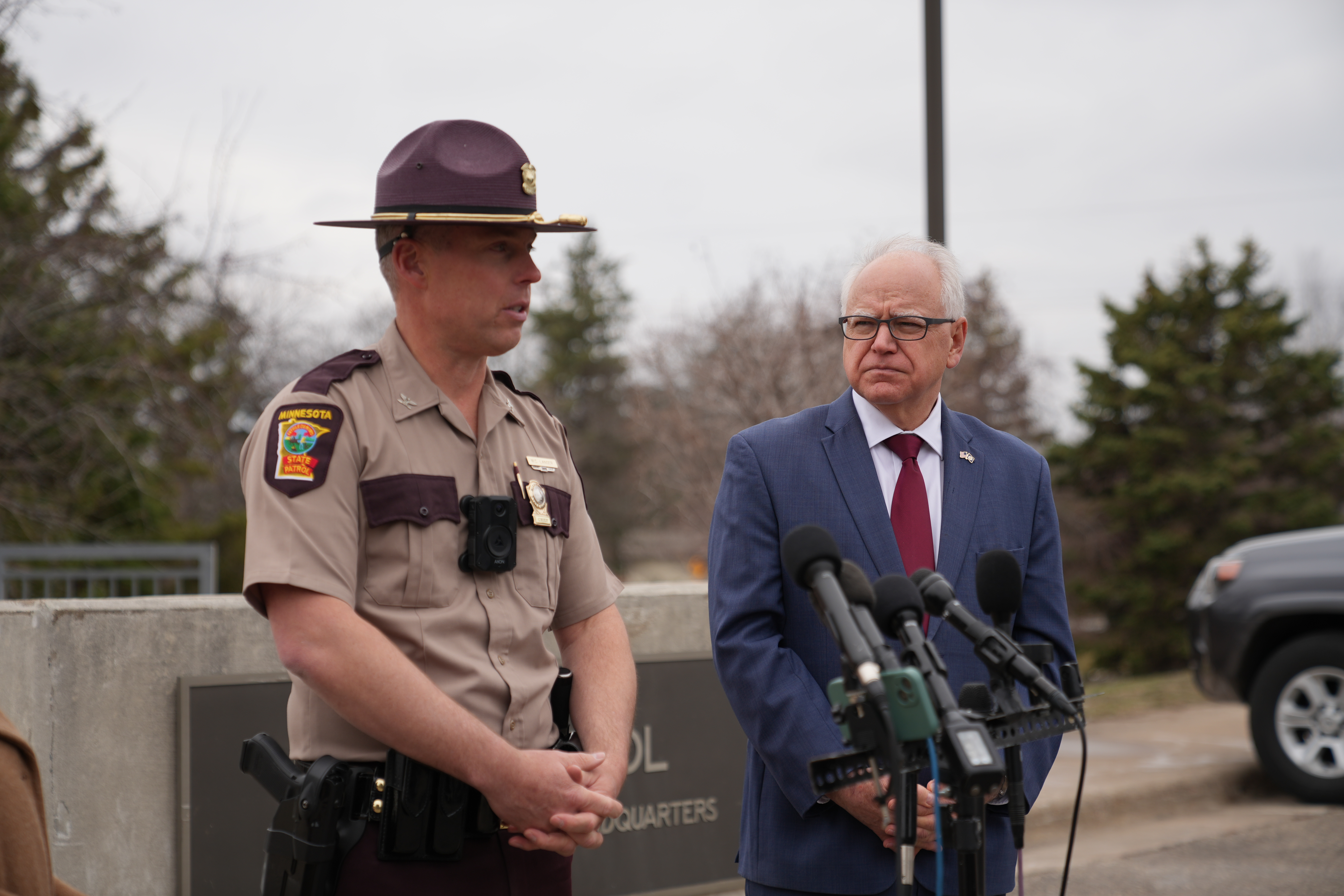
Colonel Matt Langer and Governor Tim Walz at the East Metro District Office located in Oakdale, Minnesota

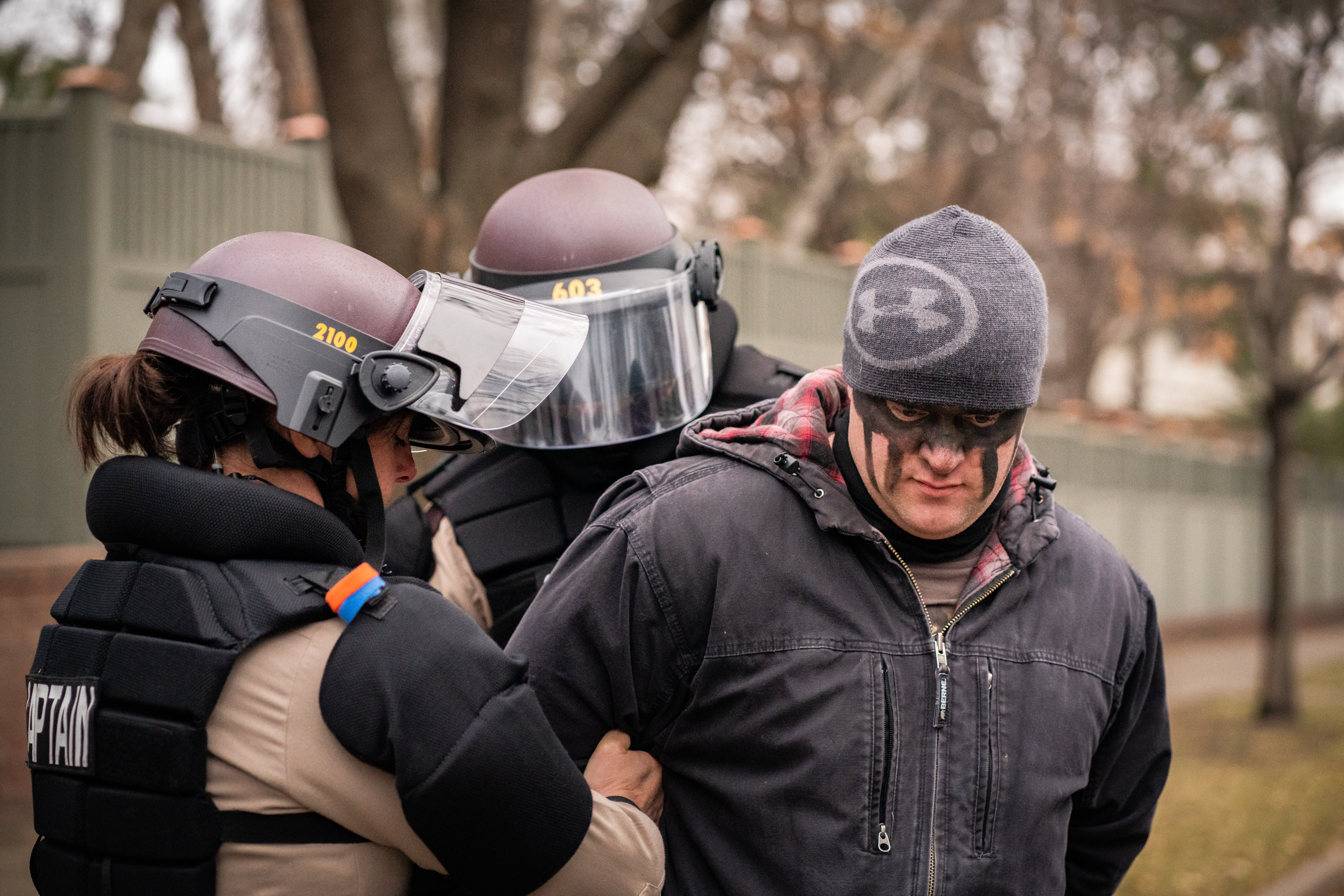
Colonel Christina Bogojevic (then captain) assists in taking a suspect into custody who allegedly attacked someone at a 2020 protest in St. Paul

Since 1929, the State Patrol has been commanded by the State Patrol Chief, who holds the rank of Colonel. The Colonel reports directly to the Minnesota Commissioner of Public Safety, who is appointed by the governor and serves in the Governor's Cabinet. In 1997, Anne L. Beers was appointed Chief of the State Patrol, as the first woman to hold the position of Commander of a State Police Agency in U.S. The following is a list of those that have held the title of State Patrol Chief:

Name	Year(s)
Earle Brown	1929–1933
John Arnoldy	1933–1938
Martin Murray	1938–1939
Eldon Row	1939–1945
Earl E. Larimer	1945–1954
Paul R. Martz	1954–1960
Leo M. Smith	1960–1966
John S. Harbinson	1966–1973
James C. Crawford	1973–1979
D. Roger Ledding	1979–1989
Kevin L. Kittridge	1989–1991
Anthony Kozojed	1991–1993
Mike P. Chabries	1993–1997
Anne L. Beers	1997–2005
Steve Mengelkoch	2005
Mark Dunaski	2005–2011
Kevin Daly	2011–2015
Matt Langer	2015–2024
Christina Bogojevic	2024–present

== Rank structure ==
Rank	Insignia	Description
Colonel		Chief of the State Patrol
Lieutenant Colonel		Assistant Chief of the State Patrol
Major		Regional Oversight
Captain		District and Section Commanders
Lieutenant		Field and Administrative Supervisors
Chief Warrant Officer		Flight Section Pilots
Technical Sergeant		Members of specialty units such as district investigations, crash reconstruction, commercial vehicle enforcement, executive protection, vehicle crimes, and training & development.
Station Sergeant		This position is generally held by the most senior trooper assigned to each station. They oversee station operations and scheduling.
Corporal		Not Used Anymore, Still in Policy
Trooper First Class		Not Used Anymore, Still in Policy
Trooper		Uniformed Rank and File
Cadet		Trainees at the Academy

== Fallen troopers ==
Since the establishment of the Minnesota State Patrol, eight troopers have died while on duty. These troopers' badge numbers were subsequently retired after their passing and have never been re-issued to new academy graduates as a sign of respect for their service and sacrifice.

Rank	Name	Date of death	Cause of death	Age	Location
Trooper	William S. Kozlak SP52	04-25-1934	Killed in a motorcycle crash	32	On Minnesota Highway 52 near Osseo, Minnesota
Trooper	Roy C. Lichtenheld SP68	10-03-1934	Killed in a motorcycle crash	30	On Snelling Avenue in St. Paul, Minnesota
Trooper	Ray X.F. Krueger SP30	11-20-1959	Killed in a head-on car crash	47	On Minnesota Highway 210 near Brainerd, Minnesota
Trooper	Glen A. Skalman SP326	12-27-1964	Succumbed to gunshot wounds sustained on 12-17-1964 during a traffic stop	29	On US-61 near Forest Lake, Minnesota
Trooper	Donald Bert Ziesmer SP180	10-15-1973	Shot and killed while sitting in his patrol car on a traffic stop	46	On Minnesota Highway 61 along the north shore of Lake Superior
Trooper	Roger Curtis Williams SP178	02-22-1978	Struck and killed by an out-of-control vehicle while helping a motorist change a flat tire	53	On I-94 near Brandon, Minnesota
Corporal	Timothy Joseph Bowe SP489	06-07-1997	Shot and killed as he and 3 county deputies approached a house where a shooting was reported	36	10 miles east of Cambridge, Minnesota in Chisago County
Corporal	Theodore Joseph "Ted" Foss SP27	08-31-2000	Struck and killed by a tractor trailer while on a traffic stop	35	On I-90 near Lewiston, Minnesota

== See also ==
- List of law enforcement agencies in Minnesota
- State police
- State patrol
- Highway patrol
