= Rumford, Maine =

Town in Maine, United States

- Town
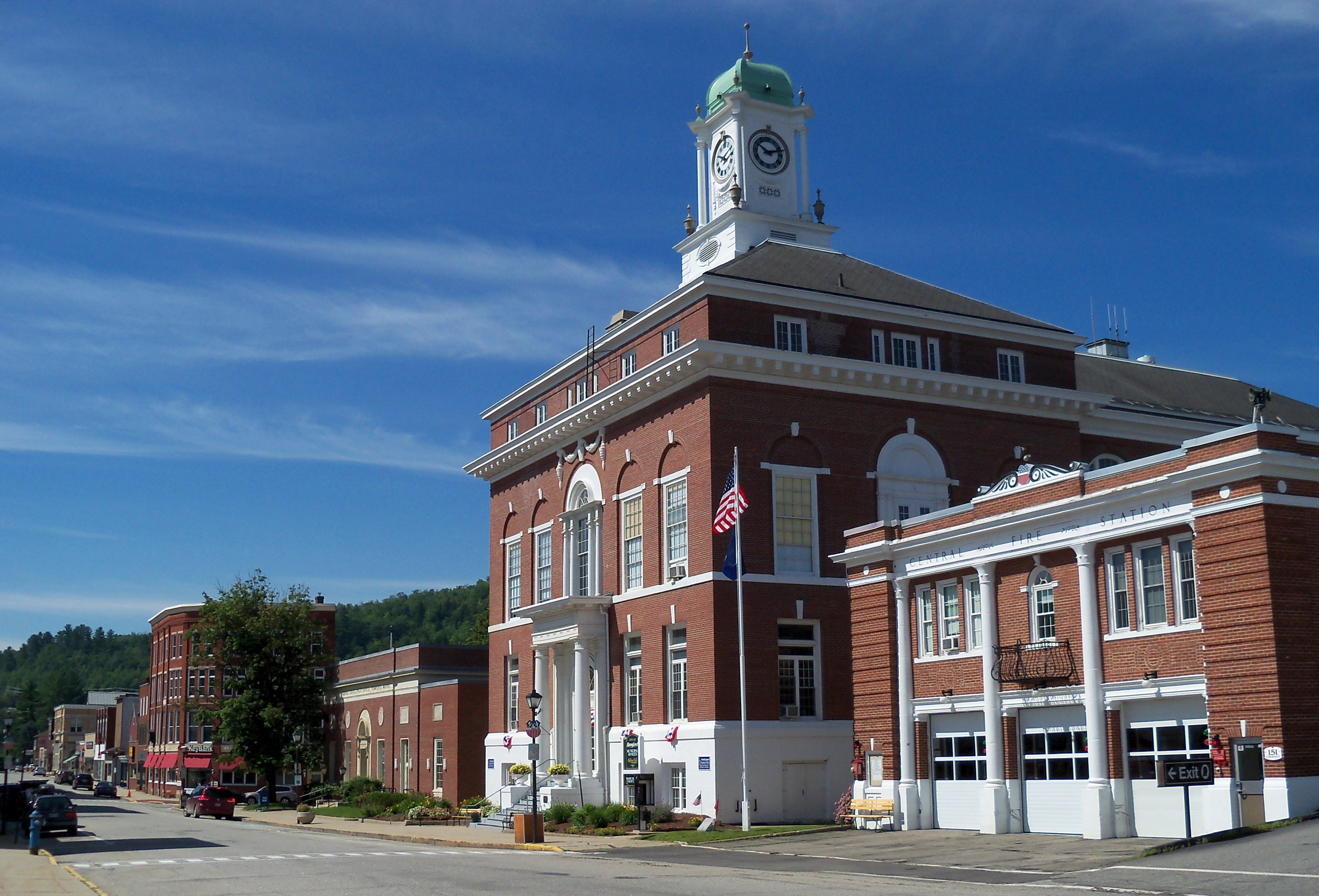
- Congress Street in downtown Rumford

- Seal Logo

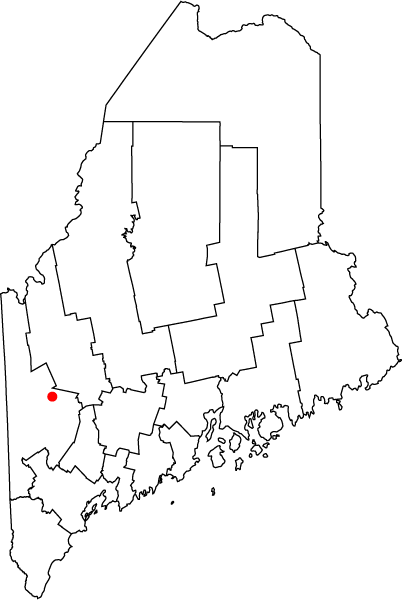
- Location of Rumford, Maine
- Coordinates: 44°31′28″N 70°34′33″W
- Country: United States
- State: Maine
- County: Oxford
- Settled: 1782
- Incorporated (town): February 21, 1800

Area
  - Total: 69.85 sq mi (180.91 km^{2})
  - Land: 68.55 sq mi (177.54 km^{2})
  - Water: 1.30 sq mi (3.37 km^{2})
- Elevation: 1,211 ft (369 m)

Population (2020)
  - Total: 5,858
  - Density: 85/sq mi (33/km^{2})
- Time zone: UTC-5 (Eastern (EST))
  - Summer (DST): UTC-4 (EDT)
- ZIP Code: 04276
- Area code: 207
- GNIS feature ID: 582703
- Website: www.rumfordme.org

Rumford is a town in Oxford County, Maine, United States. Rumford is included in the Lewiston-Auburn, Maine metropolitan New England City and Town Area. The population was 5,858 at the 2020 census. It contains the census-designated place of the same name. Rumford is home to both ND Paper Inc's Rumford Mill and the Black Mountain of Maine ski resort.

== History ==
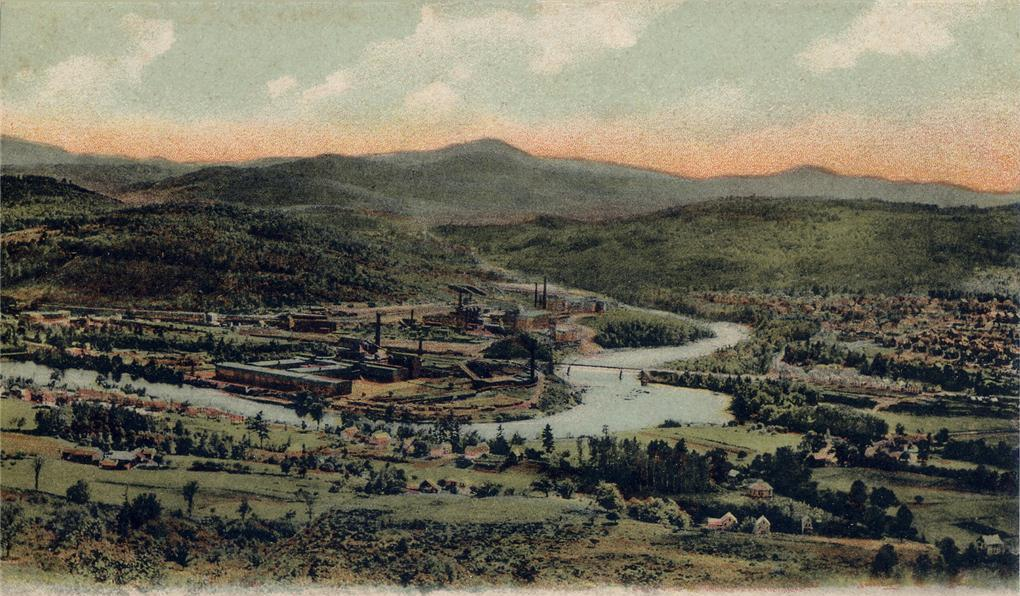
Bird's-eye view of Rumford Falls in 1905

Originally called New Pennacook Plantation, the township was granted in 1779 to Timothy Walker, Jr. and associates of Concord, New Hampshire. Both Pennacook and Rumford are former names of Concord, from which many early settlers arrived. The first pioneers, however, were Jonathan Keyes and his son Francis in 1782 from Shrewsbury, Massachusetts. Incorporated in 1800, the town would later annex land from Peru, Maine, and Franklin Plantation.

Located in the foothills of the White Mountains, Rumford is the site of Pennacook Falls, called by historian George J. Varney "the grandest cataract in New England," where the Androscoggin River drops 177 feet (54 m) over solid granite. Bands of St. Francis Indians once hunted and fished here, where salmon spawn in the 13-acre (5.3 ha) pool below Upper Falls, a barrier that fish cannot pass. Indians also came here to trade furs brought from the lakes region. Sawmills and gristmills were built to harness water power from the falls, although Rumford would remain primarily agricultural during its first 100 years.

In 1882, industrialist Hugh J. Chisholm recognized the falls' potential for the manufacture of paper. Chisholm directed construction of the Portland and Rumford Falls Railway connecting Rumford to the national rail network in 1892. The first paper mill began operation in 1893, drawing an infusion of people and money into the sleepy community of about 200 residents. Oxford Paper Company, owned by Chisholm, would dominate Rumford's riverfront and economy.

Much of the mill town was built in the spurt of prosperity between approximately 1890 and 1920, and Rumford retains significant Victorian and Edwardian architecture. Most notable is Strathglass Park, perhaps the finest company housing in the nation at that time. Wishing to avoid the stacked slums endemic at Lowell and Lawrence, Massachusetts, Hugh Chisholm commissioned Cass Gilbert in 1900 to plan a 30-acre (12 ha) site in his company town, instructing the prominent architect that "We will build of brick and stone and slate, and we will provide not merely for a house, but for comfort, elegance and social gratification."

Named after the seat of Clan Chisholm at Strathglass Carries, Scotland, Gilbert in 1901 produced 5 different designs for 51 duplexes. The same year, Chisholm founded The Rumford Realty Company to build the oval-shaped development, its entrance marked by an imposing granite gateway. With attractive lawns and broad, tree-lined streets, all maintenance was provided by the Oxford Paper Company. Even valet service was included. Tenants paid a rent of $9.00 per month, plus $1.00 per month for electricity to the Rumford Falls Power Company, also belonging to Chisholm. In 1948 with the dissolution of the Rumford Realty Company, the existing duplex buildings were first offered for sale to the tenant of the two with the longest residency. But later, each half of the single building was sold creating two owners of each building. Recognized for unique architectural and social merit, in 1974 Strathglass Park was added to the National Register of Historic Places as a historic district. Unfortunately due to lack of maintenance since that year of private sale, and due to a general deterioration of the brick and concrete materials, as well as the fact that nearly all existing buildings are owned by two independent and generally non-collaborative owners has caused each building to look like two halves, each painted differently, each maintained and repaired differently instead of the single duplex originally designed so that the entire development has taken on the look of a run-down, slummy group of buildings. A major factor in this impression is also that the development was designed before the advent of the personal automobile, but to accommodate those automobiles since then the lawns have been converted to make-shift parking lots for multiple vehicles.

Today, much of the history of Rumford is preserved by the Rumford Historical Society. Founded in 1961, under the sponsorship of prominent residents Louis Thibodeau, Minerva Anderson and Jonathan Mackenzie, the society pledges to preserve the rich history of the western mill town and encourage community involvement among all.

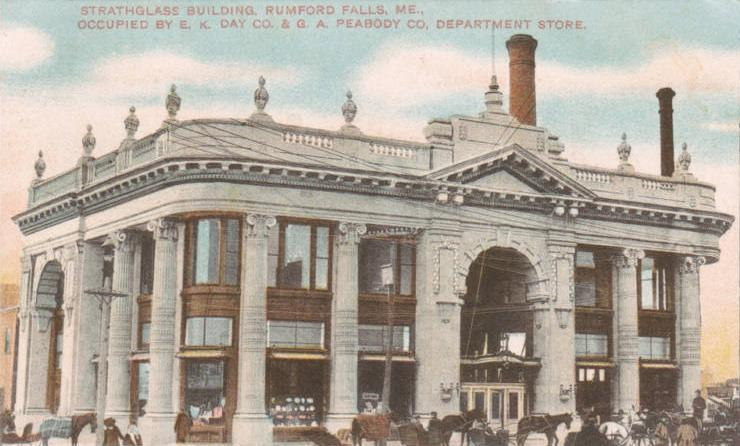
The Strathglass Building in 1907

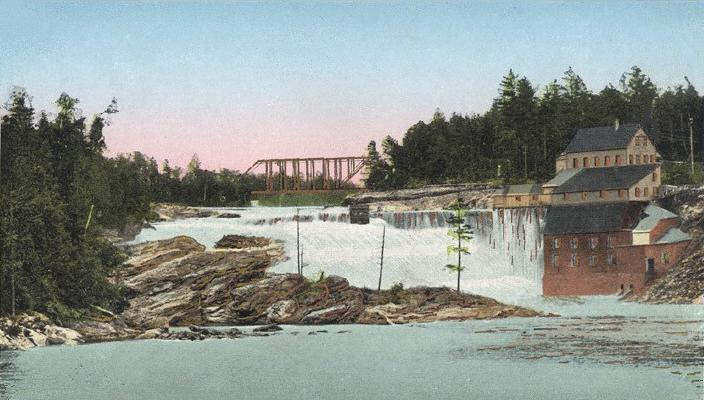
Pennacook Falls c. 1905

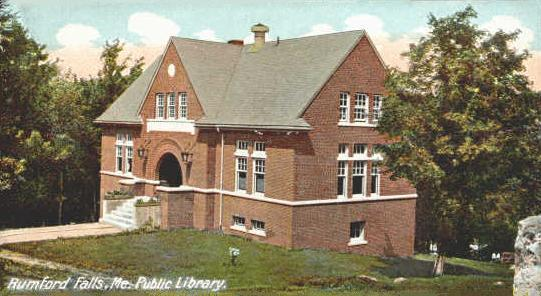
Public library c. 1907, a Carnegie library

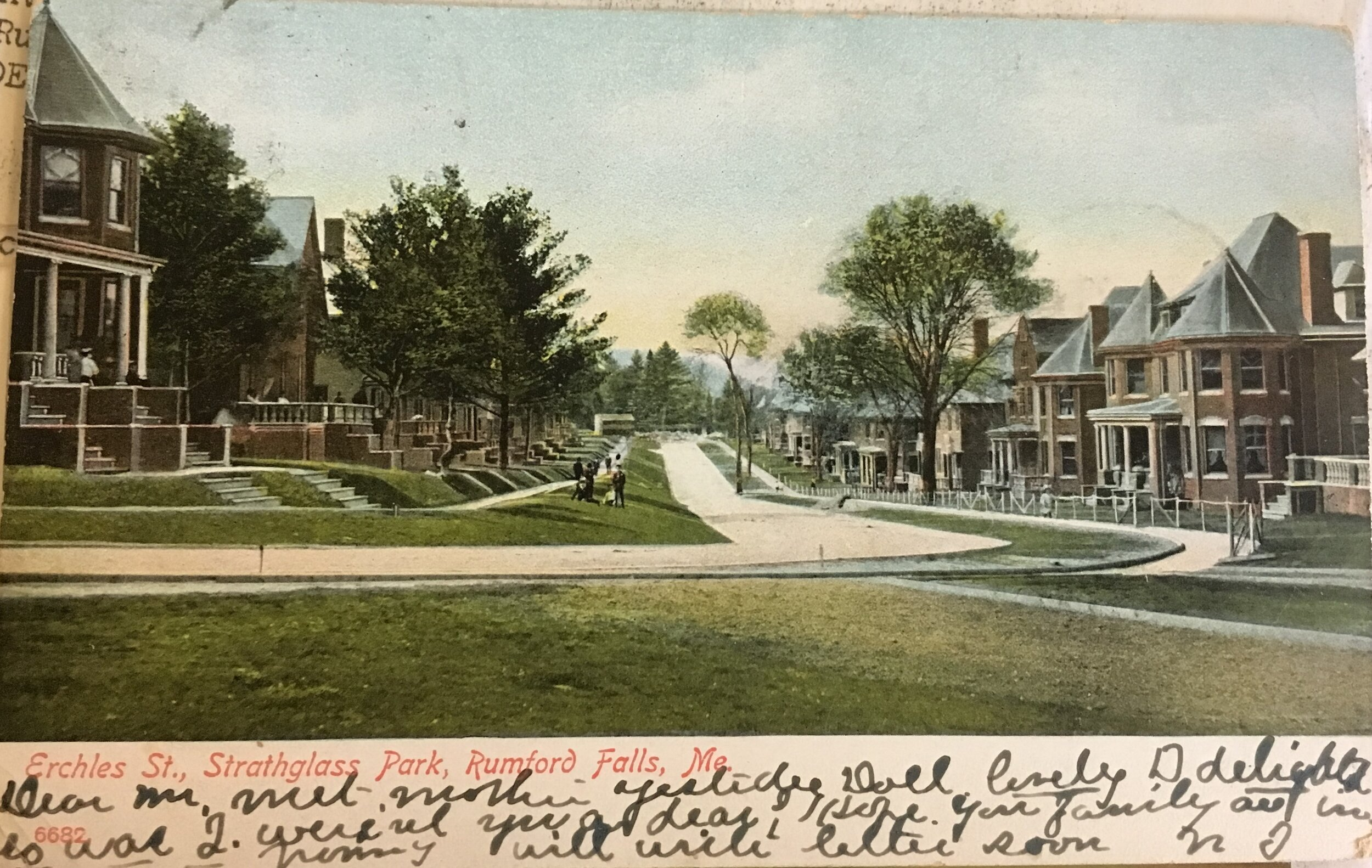
Strathglass Park housing c. 1910

In June 1941, the cabin cruiser "The Don" sunk off of Harpswell, Maine with 34 residents of Rumford on board. It remains the largest loss of life in the town's history. The cause of the wreck was never determined but multiple theories abound as to the vessel's demise including it being sunk by a U-boat or an insurance scheme. The only communication from the boat was shortly after it left port when a radio distress call came out to nearby ships with a voice saying "If I don't get off this boat somebody's gonna get thumped."

== Geography ==
According to the United States Census Bureau, the town has a total area of 69.85 square miles (180.91 km^{2}), of which 68.55 square miles (177.54 km^{2}) is land and 1.30 square miles (3.37 km^{2}) is water. Rumford is located where the Concord, Ellis, and Swift rivers drain into the Androscoggin river. Black Mountain, elevation 2,133 feet (650 m), and Rumford Whitecap, elevation 2,197 feet (670 m), are in the north.

=== Climate ===
This climatic region has large seasonal temperature differences, with warm to hot (and often humid) summers and cold (sometimes severely cold) winters. According to the Köppen Climate Classification system, Rumford has a humid continental climate, abbreviated "Dfb" on climate maps.

Climate data for Rumford, Maine, 1991–2020 normals, extremes 1948–present
Month	Jan	Feb	Mar	Apr	May	Jun	Jul	Aug	Sep	Oct	Nov	Dec	Year
Record high °F (°C)	61 (16)	62 (17)	83 (28)	90 (32)	96 (36)	98 (37)	98 (37)	100 (38)	95 (35)	86 (30)	76 (24)	67 (19)	100 (38)
Mean maximum °F (°C)	47.5 (8.6)	49.7 (9.8)	58.9 (14.9)	75.5 (24.2)	86.7 (30.4)	89.9 (32.2)	90.5 (32.5)	89.5 (31.9)	85.9 (29.9)	75.4 (24.1)	64.3 (17.9)	51.1 (10.6)	93.2 (34.0)
Mean daily maximum °F (°C)	27.5 (−2.5)	31.0 (−0.6)	39.8 (4.3)	52.6 (11.4)	66.6 (19.2)	74.4 (23.6)	79.4 (26.3)	78.0 (25.6)	70.8 (21.6)	57.5 (14.2)	44.3 (6.8)	33.0 (0.6)	54.6 (12.5)
Daily mean °F (°C)	17.1 (−8.3)	19.0 (−7.2)	28.8 (−1.8)	42.2 (5.7)	54.9 (12.7)	63.6 (17.6)	68.6 (20.3)	67.0 (19.4)	59.6 (15.3)	47.2 (8.4)	35.3 (1.8)	24.4 (−4.2)	44.0 (6.6)
Mean daily minimum °F (°C)	6.8 (−14.0)	7.0 (−13.9)	17.8 (−7.9)	31.8 (−0.1)	43.2 (6.2)	52.9 (11.6)	57.7 (14.3)	56.0 (13.3)	48.4 (9.1)	36.9 (2.7)	26.3 (−3.2)	15.8 (−9.0)	33.4 (0.8)
Mean minimum °F (°C)	−14.4 (−25.8)	−12.4 (−24.7)	−5.0 (−20.6)	19.3 (−7.1)	30.0 (−1.1)	40.1 (4.5)	47.0 (8.3)	44.4 (6.9)	33.5 (0.8)	24.7 (−4.1)	12.3 (−10.9)	−3.9 (−19.9)	−17.0 (−27.2)
Record low °F (°C)	−36 (−38)	−34 (−37)	−23 (−31)	−1 (−18)	23 (−5)	29 (−2)	38 (3)	34 (1)	25 (−4)	15 (−9)	−2 (−19)	−29 (−34)	−36 (−38)
Average precipitation inches (mm)	3.28 (83)	2.38 (60)	3.17 (81)	4.12 (105)	3.69 (94)	6.10 (155)	4.52 (115)	4.75 (121)	3.70 (94)	4.96 (126)	4.23 (107)	3.98 (101)	48.88 (1,242)
Average snowfall inches (cm)	24.6 (62)	20.2 (51)	17.5 (44)	4.9 (12)	0.0 (0.0)	0.0 (0.0)	0.0 (0.0)	0.0 (0.0)	0.0 (0.0)	0.1 (0.25)	3.8 (9.7)	16.8 (43)	87.9 (221.95)
Average extreme snow depth inches (cm)	18.1 (46)	22.9 (58)	22.6 (57)	7.1 (18)	0.2 (0.51)	0.0 (0.0)	0.0 (0.0)	0.0 (0.0)	0.0 (0.0)	0.3 (0.76)	2.7 (6.9)	12.4 (31)	28.3 (72)
Average precipitation days (≥ 0.01 in)	9.3	7.5	8.4	9.1	11.1	11.7	12.4	11.2	9.1	10.6	10.0	10.6	121.0
Average snowy days (≥ 0.1 in)	6.9	5.4	5.1	1.5	0.0	0.0	0.0	0.0	0.0	0.1	1.7	5.7	26.4
Source 1: NOAA
Source 2: National Weather Service

== Demographics ==
Historical population
Census	Pop.	Note	%±
1800	262		—
1810	629		140.1%
1820	871		38.5%
1830	1,126		29.3%
1840	1,444		28.2%
1850	1,375		−4.8%
1860	1,375		0.0%
1870	1,212		−11.9%
1880	1,006		−17.0%
1890	898		−10.7%
1900	3,770		319.8%
1910	6,777		79.8%
1920	8,576		26.5%
1930	10,340		20.6%
1940	10,230		−1.1%
1950	9,954		−2.7%
1960	10,005		0.5%
1970	9,363		−6.4%
1980	8,240		−12.0%
1990	7,078		−14.1%
2000	6,472		−8.6%
2010	5,841		−9.7%
2020	5,858		0.3%

=== 2010 census ===
As of the census of 2010, there were 5,841 people, 2,674 households, and 1,524 families living in the town. The population density was 85.2 inhabitants per square mile (32.9/km^{2}). There were 3,287 housing units at an average density of 48.0 per square mile (18.5/km^{2}). The racial makeup of the town was 97.2% White, 0.6% African American, 0.2% Native American, 0.2% Asian, 0.6% from other races, and 1.2% from two or more races. Hispanic or Latino of any race were 1.6% of the population.

There were 2,674 households, of which 24.2% had children under the age of 18 living with them, 39.8% were married couples living together, 11.9% had a female householder with no husband present, 5.3% had a male householder with no wife present, and 43.0% were non-families. 34.9% of all households were made up of individuals, and 15.6% had someone living alone who was 65 years of age or older. The average household size was 2.17 and the average family size was 2.76.

The median age in the town was 45.5 years. 20.1% of residents were under the age of 18; 8.1% were between the ages of 18 and 24; 21% were from 25 to 44; 30.6% were from 45 to 64; and 20.2% were 65 years of age or older. The gender makeup of the town was 48.4% male and 51.6% female.

=== 2000 census ===
As of the census of 2000, there were 6,472 people, 2,876 households, and 1,754 families living in the town. The population density was 94.3 inhabitants per square mile (36.4/km^{2}). There were 3,280 housing units at an average density of 47.8 per square mile (18.5/km^{2}). The racial makeup of the town was 98.67% White, 0.11% Black or African American, 0.32% Native American, 0.26% Asian, 0.06% from other races, and 0.57% from two or more races. Hispanic or Latino of any race were 0.60% of the population.

There were 2,876 households, of which 26.6% had children under the age of 18 living with them, 45.4% were married couples living together, 11.2% had a female householder with no husband present, and 39.0% were non-families. 33.6% of all households were made up of individuals, and 16.0% had someone living alone who was 65 years of age or older. The average household size was 2.21 and the average family size was 2.78.

In the town, the population was spread out, with 23.1% under the age of 18, 7.1% from 18 to 24, 25.9% from 25 to 44, 22.1% from 45 to 64, and 21.7% who were 65 years of age or older. The median age was 41 years. For every 100 females, there were 92.3 males. For every 100 females age 18 and over, there were 90.3 males.

The median income for a household in the town was $27,639, and the median income for a family was $33,878. Males had a median income of $39,917 versus $20,632 for females. The per capita income for the town was $16,701. About 12.4% of families and 16.1% of the population were below the poverty line, including 21.9% of those under age 18 and 11.3% of those age 65 or over.

== Education ==
The University College at Rumford/Mexico is a part of the University of Maine system.

Mountain Valley High School is Rumford's public high school.

== Notable people ==
- Charlie Akers, Olympic biathlete
- Richard Austin, weight-lifting world record-holder
- Severin Beliveau, former Maine Democratic Party Chair and lobbyist
- Wendall "Chummy" Broomhall, cross-country skier in Olympic Games
- Mark Bryant, Maine State Representative; Maine State Senator
- Chet Bulger, offensive tackle for the 1947 champion Chicago Cardinals
- Frank Churchill, songwriter and film composer (Snow White and the Seven Dwarfs, The Three Little Pigs)
- Lucia M. Cormier, Minority Leader of the Maine House of Representative
- James C. Frost, Minnesota State Representative; Sheriff of Anoka County, Minnesota
- Charles Harlow, Mayor of Portland, Maine and State Representative
- Rachel A. Henderson, state legislator
- Rebecca Martin, singer and songwriter
- Edmund Muskie, US senator, Secretary of State, 64th governor of Maine
- John Patrick, Maine State Representative; Maine State Senator
- Robert W. Pidacks, cross-country skier in Olympic Games
- Eric Weinrich, professional ice-hockey player and in Olympic Games
