= Anoka County Sheriff's Office =

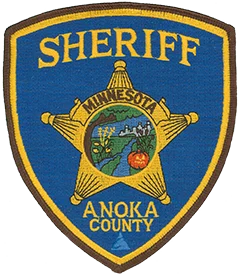
- Patch of the Anoka County Sheriff's Office
- Abbreviation: ACSO
- Motto: "To protect and serve the community in a manner that preserves the public trust"

Agency overview
- Formed: June 30, 1857
- Employees: 300+ (with volunteers)
- Volunteers: 300+ (with employees)

Jurisdictional structure
- Operations jurisdiction: Anoka County, Minnesota, Minnesota, USA
- Map of Anoka County Sheriff's Office's jurisdiction
- Area: 446 square miles (1,160 km^{2})
- Population: 353,813 (2018)
- General nature: Local civilian police

Operational structure
- Headquarters: Andover, Minnesota

Website
- Anoka County Sheriff's Office

The Anoka County Sheriff's Office is the sheriff's office of Anoka County, Minnesota, in the United States. The ACSO is the 4th largest county in the State of Minnesota. It currently serves at least 400,000 residents and is headquartered in Andover. The ACSO comprises 21 cities and townships and is part of the seven-county Metropolitan area. Their services include crime prevention, providing assistance to crime victims, and providing firearms permits. Brad Wise is the current Sheriff and has been the Sheriff of Anoka County since 2023. The office is organized into six individual divisions including Administration, Justice Services, Jail, Patrol, Criminal Investigations (CID), and Midwest Regional Forensic Laboratory.

== Administration ==
This division of the ACSO watches over the day-to-day operations, it provides human resources to customers, and it also oversees the financial and fleet management for the office. The functions of Administration include The Professional Standards Unit and The Training Unit. The PSU is in charge of insuring that the employees of the ACSO comply with the professional standards. The TU is responsible for establishing and scheduling training for all Sheriffs Office employees as well as sworn officers county wide. The training is performed in conjunction with the Anoka County Law Enforcement Training Center. Some of the duties include background and internal affairs investigations.

== Justice Services ==
This division is in charge of records, warrants, civil processing, court security, and prisoner transports.

- Civil Unit - This part of the division helps enforce the district court serving court orders. Almost 7,500 papers are served every year.
- Warrants - Warrants vigorously seek out and capture individuals who have a warrant that is active.
- Court Security - This unit protects staff and visitors in the court rooms, and it makes sure that those in court follow instructions. Every year, this unit provides 26,000 hours of in court security in order to keep citizens safe.
- Prisoner Transport - This transporting system helps transport court orders, warrants, extraditions, and prisoners. These transport services offer details to help guard the prisoners. This unit provides almost 3.000 transports every year by traveling 130,000 miles across the country.

== Jail ==
The jail of Anoka County is located in Downtown Anoka, and is a 238-bed detention center for criminals who have become incarcerated because of a criminal offense. This jail is the primary adult booking building for all departments within the Anoka County area. Annually, the jail takes in over 10,000 people and the jail houses many individuals for the United States Marshal Service. More responsibilities of the jail include being in charge of the electronic posting of all issued warrants, providing the status of warrants to the law enforcement agencies, and clearing out warrants that are over and have already been served. Every year, the jail goes through over 6,000 warrants.

== Patrol ==
This division of the ACSO provides services to one township and seven cities in the Northern part of Anoka County. The Patrol division maintains contact services with the cities of Andover, Bethel, Columbus, East Bethel, Ham Lake, Linwood Township, Nowthen, and Oak Grove. They respond to over 35,000 calls per year and they are responsible for 244 square miles of service converge. Additional services that the Patrol division take care of are:

- Recreational Unit
- School Resource/Liaison Officers (SRO)
- SWAT Team
- K-9 Unit
- Investigations Unit
- Crime Watch
- Dive Team
- Reserve Unit

== Criminal Investigations ==
Criminal Investigations handle things like sexual assault, homicide, and other suspicious death cases that occur in the Anoka County area. Some other areas of investigation include child maltreatment, welfare, fraud, computer forensics, and polygraph services. The division operates the Anoka-Hennepin Narcotics and Violent Crimes Task Force. Annually the division handles over 1,600 felony cases, including over 500 sexual assaults. The Criminal Investigations department has a Crime Lab. This lab provides services to all agencies in Anoka County by processing crime scenes for evidence. The crime scene unit processes over 500 crimes annually.

== Midwest Regional Forensics Laboratory ==
This laboratory offers services to local law enforcement agencies within the counties of Anoka, Sherburne, and Wright in the forensic disciplines of latent prints, drug chemistry, blood/urine alcohol testing and DNA analysis.

== Notable incidents ==
In late May 2020, the Anoka County Sheriff's Department was involved in policing the George Floyd protests in Minneapolis–Saint Paul. The department slashed tyres of unoccupied vehicles parked near protests, admitting their involvement around a week later.

== Sheriffs of Anoka County ==
- 1857-1858 James C. Frost - appointed

Elected:

- 1858-1862 Thomas Henderson
- 1862-1864 W.G. Randolph
- 1864-1868 Thomas Henderson
- 1868-1872 James Frost
- 1872-1874 M.V. Bean
- 1874-1884 James Frost
- 1884-1892 Charles W. Lenfist
- 1892-1898 John Tierney
- 1898-1900 George W. Merill
- 1900-1902 John Tierney
- 1902-1909 John Palmer
- 1909-1914 John Casey
- 1914-1930 U.S. "Red" Pratt
- 1930-1946 O.M. "Oscar" Olson
- 1946-1960 L.A. "Mike" Auspos
- 1960-1987 Ralph "Buster" Talbot
- 1987-1995 Ken Wilkinson
- 1995-2002 Larry Podany
- 2002-2011 Bruce Andersohn
- 2011–2023 James Stuart
- 2023–Present Brad Wise
