= Chummy Broomhall =

American cross-country skier

Wendall "Chummy" Broomhall (December 3, 1919 – December 30, 2017) was an American cross-country skier who competed in the 1948 and 1952 Winter Olympics. He finished 65th in the 18 km event at the 1948 Winter Olympics in St. Moritz, and finished 57th in the same event at the 1952 Winter Olympics in Oslo. He was a member of the United States Ski Team from 1947 to 1954.

== Biography ==
Broomhall was born in Mexico, Maine, and became a member of the Chisholm Ski Club in the 1930s. During World War II, he served in the 10th Mountain Division.

Broomhall is the designer for the cross-country trails for both the 1960 Winter Olympics at Squaw Valley, California, and the 1980 Winter Olympics at Lake Placid, New York, and also served as chief of competition both times. In 1960, Broomhall was the first to use mechanized equipment to groom the trails, a job previously performed by feet and handheld rakes. This was made necessary because of the icy conditions caused by afternoon sun melting the snow followed by cold nights.

Broomhall has donated 300 acres (1.2 km^{2}) of land to the Chisholm Ski Club, used to create skiing facilities in the Rumford area after returning from World War II. These efforts culminated in the formation of Black Mountain of Maine, which opened in 1962. He designed the cross-country trails there as well, now named Broomhall Stadium. The site has since hosted numerous national cross-country skiing championships, and Broomhall remained involved until his death.

Broomhall was inducted into the National Ski Hall of Fame in 1981, and was an inaugural member of the Maine Ski Hall of Fame when it was founded in 2003. In 2007, Black Mountain started a new annual tournament for Maine collegiate skiers, named the Chummy Broomhall Cup in his honor. Broomhall died in December 2017 at the age of 98.

== See also ==
- Bucky Broomhall
