= List of Olympic medalists in cross-country skiing =

Cross-country skiing is a sport that has been contested at the Winter Olympic Games since the inaugural games in 1924.

== Men ==
The numbers in brackets denotes cross-country skiers who won gold medal in corresponding disciplines more than one time. Bold numbers denotes record number of victories in certain disciplines.

=== 18, 15 and 10 km ===
Games	Gold	Silver	Bronze
**18 km**
1924 Chamonix	Thorleif Haug; Norway	Johan Grøttumsbråten; Norway	Tapani Niku; Finland
1928 St. Moritz	Johan Grøttumsbråten; Norway	Ole Hegge; Norway	Reidar Ødegaard; Norway
1932 Lake Placid	Sven Utterström; Sweden	Axel Wikström; Sweden	Veli Saarinen; Finland
1936 Garmisch-Partenkirchen	Erik Larsson; Sweden	Oddbjørn Hagen; Norway	Pekka Niemi; Finland
1948 St. Moritz	Martin Lundström; Sweden	Nils Östensson; Sweden	Gunnar Eriksson; Sweden
1952 Oslo	Hallgeir Brenden; Norway	Tapio Mäkelä; Finland	Paavo Lonkila; Finland
**15 km (first era)**
1956 Cortina d'Ampezzo	Hallgeir Brenden; Norway	Sixten Jernberg; Sweden	Pavel Kolchin; Soviet Union
1960 Squaw Valley	Håkon Brusveen; Norway	Sixten Jernberg; Sweden	Veikko Hakulinen; Finland
1964 Innsbruck	Eero Mäntyranta; Finland	Harald Grønningen; Norway	Sixten Jernberg; Sweden
1968 Grenoble	Harald Grønningen; Norway	Eero Mäntyranta; Finland	Gunnar Larsson; Sweden
1972 Sapporo	Sven-Åke Lundbäck; Sweden	Fyodor Simashev; Soviet Union	Ivar Formo; Norway
1976 Innsbruck	Nikolay Bazhukov; Soviet Union	Yevgeny Belyayev; Soviet Union	Arto Koivisto; Finland
1980 Lake Placid	Thomas Wassberg; Sweden	Juha Mieto; Finland	Ove Aunli; Norway
1984 Sarajevo	Gunde Svan; Sweden	Aki Karvonen; Finland	Harri Kirvesniemi; Finland
1988 Calgary	Mikhail Devyatyarov; Soviet Union	Pål Gunnar Mikkelsplass; Norway	Vladimir Smirnov; Soviet Union
**10 km (first era)**
1992 Albertville	Vegard Ulvang; Norway	Marco Albarello; Italy	Christer Majbäck; Sweden
1994 Lillehammer	Bjørn Dæhlie; Norway	Vladimir Smirnov; Kazakhstan	Marco Albarello; Italy
1998 Nagano	Bjørn Dæhlie; Norway	Markus Gandler; Austria	Mika Myllylä; Finland
**15 km (second era)**
2002 Salt Lake City	Andrus Veerpalu; Estonia	Frode Estil; Norway	Jaak Mae; Estonia
2006 Turin	Andrus Veerpalu; Estonia	Lukáš Bauer; Czech Republic	Tobias Angerer; Germany
2010 Vancouver	Dario Cologna; Switzerland	Pietro Piller Cottrer; Italy	Lukáš Bauer; Czech Republic
2014 Sochi	Dario Cologna; Switzerland	Johan Olsson; Sweden	Daniel Rickardsson; Sweden
2018 Pyeongchang	Dario Cologna; Switzerland	Simen Hegstad Krüger; Norway	Denis Spitsov; Olympic Athletes from Russia
2022 Beijing	Iivo Niskanen; Finland	Alexander Bolshunov; ROC	Johannes Høsflot Klæbo; Norway
**10 km (second era)**
2026 Milano Cortina	Johannes Høsflot Klæbo; Norway	Mathis Desloges; France	Einar Hedegart; Norway

Classic style: 1924–1936, 1948–2006, 2014, 2022. Freestyle: 2010, 2018, 2026.

Medals
Rank	Nation	Gold	Silver	Bronze	Total
1	Norway	10	7	5	22
2	Sweden	6	5	5	16
3	Switzerland	3	0	0	3
4	Finland	2	4	8	14
5	Soviet Union	2	2	2	6
6	Estonia	2	0	1	3
7	Italy	0	2	1	3
8	Czech Republic	0	1	1	2
9	Austria	0	1	0	1
9	France	0	1	0	1
9	Kazakhstan	0	1	0	1
9	ROC	0	1	0	1
13	Germany	0	0	1	1
13	Olympic Athletes from Russia	0	0	1	1
Total	**14 nations**	**25**	**25**	**25**	**75**

=== 50 km ===
Games	Gold	Silver	Bronze
1924 Chamonix	Thorleif Haug; Norway	Thoralf Strømstad; Norway	Johan Grøttumsbråten; Norway
1928 St. Moritz	Per-Erik Hedlund; Sweden	Gustaf Jonsson; Sweden	Volger Andersson; Sweden
1932 Lake Placid	Veli Saarinen; Finland	Väinö Liikkanen; Finland	Arne Rustadstuen; Norway
1936 Garmisch-Partenkirchen	Elis Wiklund; Sweden	Axel Wikström; Sweden	Nils-Joel Englund; Sweden
1948 St. Moritz	Nils Karlsson; Sweden	Harald Eriksson; Sweden	Benjamin Vanninen; Finland
1952 Oslo	Veikko Hakulinen; Finland	Eero Kolehmainen; Finland	Magnar Estenstad; Norway
1956 Cortina d'Ampezzo	Sixten Jernberg; Sweden	Veikko Hakulinen; Finland	Fyodor Terentyev; Soviet Union
1960 Squaw Valley	Kalevi Hämäläinen; Finland	Veikko Hakulinen; Finland	Rolf Rämgård; Sweden
1964 Innsbruck	Sixten Jernberg **(2)**; Sweden	Assar Rönnlund; Sweden	Arto Tiainen; Finland
1968 Grenoble	Ole Ellefsæter; Norway	Vyacheslav Vedenin; Soviet Union	Josef Haas; Switzerland
1972 Sapporo	Pål Tyldum; Norway	Magne Myrmo; Norway	Vyacheslav Vedenin; Soviet Union
1976 Innsbruck	Ivar Formo; Norway	Gert-Dietmar Klause; East Germany	Benny Södergren; Sweden
1980 Lake Placid	Nikolay Zimyatov; Soviet Union	Juha Mieto; Finland	Alexander Zavyalov; Soviet Union
1984 Sarajevo	Thomas Wassberg; Sweden	Gunde Svan; Sweden	Aki Karvonen; Finland
1988 Calgary	Gunde Svan; Sweden	Maurilio De Zolt; Italy	Andi Grünenfelder; Switzerland
1992 Albertville	Bjørn Dæhlie; Norway	Maurilio De Zolt; Italy	Giorgio Vanzetta; Italy
1994 Lillehammer	Vladimir Smirnov; Kazakhstan	Mika Myllylä; Finland	Sture Sivertsen; Norway
1998 Nagano	Bjørn Dæhlie **(2)**; Norway	Niklas Jonsson; Sweden	Christian Hoffmann; Austria
2002 Salt Lake City	Mikhail Ivanov; Russia	Andrus Veerpalu; Estonia	Odd-Bjørn Hjelmeset; Norway
2006 Turin	Giorgio Di Centa; Italy	Yevgeny Dementyev; Russia	Mikhail Botvinov; Austria
2010 Vancouver	Petter Northug; Norway	Axel Teichmann; Germany	Johan Olsson; Sweden
2014 Sochi	Alexander Legkov; Russia	Maxim Vylegzhanin; Russia	Ilia Chernousov; Russia
2018 Pyeongchang	Iivo Niskanen; Finland	Alexander Bolshunov; Olympic Athletes from Russia	Andrey Larkov; Olympic Athletes from Russia
2022 Beijing	Alexander Bolshunov; ROC	Ivan Yakimushkin; ROC	Simen Hegstad Krüger; Norway
2026 Milano Cortina	Johannes Høsflot Klæbo; Norway	Martin Løwstrøm Nyenget; Norway	Emil Iversen; Norway

Classic style: 1924–1936, 1948–1984, 1994, 2002, 2010, 2018, 2026. Freestyle: 1988–1992, 1998, 2006, 2014, 2022. Mass start: 2006–2026.

- Medals:

Rank	Nation	Gold	Silver	Bronze	Total
1	Norway	**8**	3	**7**	**18**
2	Sweden	7	**6**	5	**18**
3	Finland	4	**6**	3	13
4	Russia	2	2	1	5
5	Italy	1	2	1	4
6	Soviet Union	1	1	3	5
7	Kazakhstan	1	0	0	1
8	ROC	1	1	0	2
9	Olympic Athletes from Russia	0	1	1	2
10	East Germany	0	1	0	1
10	Estonia	0	1	0	1
10	Germany	0	1	0	1
13	Austria	0	0	2	2
13	Switzerland	0	0	2	2
Total		24	24	24	72

=== Relay ===
Games	Gold	Silver	Bronze
**4 × 10 km relay**
1936 Garmisch-Partenkirchen	Finland; Sulo Nurmela; Klaes Karppinen; Matti Lähde; Kalle Jalkanen	Norway; Oddbjørn Hagen; Olaf Hoffsbakken; Sverre Brodahl; Bjarne Iversen	Sweden; John Berger; Erik Larsson; Arthur Häggblad; Martin Matsbo
1948 St. Moritz	Sweden; Nils Östensson; Nils Täpp; Gunnar Eriksson; Martin Lundström	Finland; Lauri Silvennoinen; Teuvo Laukkanen; Sauli Rytky; August Kiuru	Norway; Erling Evensen; Olav Økern; Reidar Nyborg; Olav Hagen
1952 Oslo	Finland; Heikki Hasu; Paavo Lonkila; Urpo Korhonen; Tapio Mäkelä	Norway; Magnar Estenstad; Mikal Kirkholt; Martin Stokken; Hallgeir Brenden	Sweden; Nils Täpp; Sigurd Andersson; Enar Josefsson; Martin Lundström
1956 Cortina d'Ampezzo	Soviet Union; Fyodor Terentyev; Pavel Kolchin; Nikolay Anikin; Vladimir Kuzin	Finland; August Kiuru; Jorma Kortelainen; Arvo Viitanen; Veikko Hakulinen	Sweden; Lennart Larsson; Gunnar Samuelsson; Per-Erik Larsson; Sixten Jernberg
1960 Squaw Valley	Finland; Toimi Alatalo; Eero Mäntyranta; Väinö Huhtala; Veikko Hakulinen	Norway; Harald Grønningen; Hallgeir Brenden; Einar Østby; Håkon Brusveen	Soviet Union; Anatoly Shelyukhin; Gennady Vaganov; Alexey Kuznetsov; Nikolay Anikin
1964 Innsbruck	Sweden; Karl-Åke Asph; Sixten Jernberg; Janne Stefansson; Assar Rönnlund	Finland; Väinö Huhtala; Arto Tiainen; Kalevi Laurila; Eero Mäntyranta	Soviet Union; Ivan Utrobin; Gennady Vaganov; Igor Voronchikhin; Pavel Kolchin
1968 Grenoble	Norway; Odd Martinsen; Pål Tyldum; Harald Grønningen; Ole Ellefsæter	Sweden; Jan Halvarsson; Bjarne Andersson; Gunnar Larsson; Assar Rönnlund	Finland; Kalevi Oikarainen; Hannu Taipale; Kalevi Laurila; Eero Mäntyranta
1972 Sapporo	Soviet Union; Vladimir Voronkov; Yuri Skobov; Fyodor Simashev; Vyacheslav Vedenin	Norway; Oddvar Brå; Pål Tyldum; Ivar Formo; Johs Harviken	Switzerland; Alfred Kälin; Albert Giger; Alois Kälin; Eduard Hauser
1976 Innsbruck	Finland; Matti Pitkänen; Juha Mieto; Pertti Teurajärvi; Arto Koivisto	Norway; Pål Tyldum; Einar Sagstuen; Ivar Formo; Odd Martinsen	Soviet Union; Yevgeny Belyayev; Nikolay Bazhukov; Sergey Savelyev; Ivan Garanin
1980 Lake Placid	Soviet Union; Vasily Rochev; Nikolay Bazhukov; Yevgeny Belyayev; Nikolay Zimyatov	Norway; Lars Erik Eriksen; Per Knut Aaland; Ove Aunli; Oddvar Brå	Finland; Harri Kirvesniemi; Pertti Teurajärvi; Matti Pitkänen; Juha Mieto
1984 Sarajevo	Sweden; Thomas Wassberg; Benny Kohlberg; Jan Ottosson; Gunde Svan	Soviet Union; Alexander Batyuk; Alexander Zavyalov; Vladimir Nikitin; Nikolay Zimyatov	Finland; Kari Ristanen; Juha Mieto; Harri Kirvesniemi; Aki Karvonen
1988 Calgary	Sweden; Jan Ottosson **(2)**; Thomas Wassberg **(2)**; Gunde Svan **(2)**; Torgny Mogren	Soviet Union; Vladimir Smirnov; Vladimir Sakhnov; Mikhail Devyatyarov; Alexey Prokurorov	Czechoslovakia; Radim Nyč; Václav Korunka; Pavel Benc; Ladislav Švanda
1992 Albertville	Norway; Terje Langli; Vegard Ulvang; Kristen Skjeldal; Bjørn Dæhlie	Italy; Giuseppe Puliè; Marco Albarello; Giorgio Vanzetta; Silvio Fauner	Finland; Mika Kuusisto; Harri Kirvesniemi; Jari Räsänen; Jari Isometsä
1994 Lillehammer	Italy; Maurilio De Zolt; Marco Albarello; Giorgio Vanzetta; Silvio Fauner	Norway; Sture Sivertsen; Vegard Ulvang; Thomas Alsgaard; Bjørn Dæhlie	Finland; Mika Myllylä; Harri Kirvesniemi; Jari Räsänen; Jari Isometsä
1998 Nagano	Norway; Sture Sivertsen; Erling Jevne; Bjørn Dæhlie **(2)**; Thomas Alsgaard	Italy; Marco Albarello; Fulvio Valbusa; Fabio Maj; Silvio Fauner	Finland; Harri Kirvesniemi; Mika Myllylä; Sami Repo; Jari Isometsä
2002 Salt Lake City	Norway; Anders Aukland; Frode Estil; Kristen Skjeldal **(2)**; Thomas Alsgaard **(2)**	Italy; Fabio Maj; Giorgio Di Centa; Pietro Piller Cottrer; Cristian Zorzi	Germany; Jens Filbrich; Andreas Schlütter; Tobias Angerer; René Sommerfeldt
2006 Turin	Italy; Fulvio Valbusa; Giorgio Di Centa; Pietro Piller Cottrer; Cristian Zorzi	Germany; Andreas Schlütter; Jens Filbrich; René Sommerfeldt; Tobias Angerer	Sweden; Mats Larsson; Johan Olsson; Anders Södergren; Mathias Fredriksson
2010 Vancouver	Sweden; Daniel Rickardsson; Johan Olsson; Anders Södergren; Marcus Hellner	Norway; Martin Johnsrud Sundby; Odd-Bjørn Hjelmeset; Lars Berger; Petter Northug	Czech Republic; Martin Jakš; Lukáš Bauer; Jiří Magál; Martin Koukal
2014 Sochi	Sweden; Lars Nelson; Daniel Rickardsson **(2)**; Johan Olsson **(2)**; Marcus Hellner **(2)**	Russia; Dmitry Yaparov; Alexander Bessmertnykh; Alexander Legkov; Maxim Vylegzhanin	France; Jean-Marc Gaillard; Maurice Manificat; Robin Duvillard; Ivan Perrillat Boiteux
2018 Pyeongchang	Norway; Didrik Tønseth; Martin Johnsrud Sundby; Simen Hegstad Krüger; Johannes Høsflot Klæbo	Olympic Athletes from Russia; Andrey Larkov; Alexander Bolshunov; Alexey Chervotkin; Denis Spitsov	France; Jean-Marc Gaillard; Maurice Manificat; Clément Parisse; Adrien Backscheider
2022 Beijing	ROC; Aleksey Chervotkin; Alexander Bolshunov; Denis Spitsov; Sergey Ustiugov	Norway; Emil Iversen; Pål Golberg; Hans Christer Holund; Johannes Høsflot Klæbo	France; Richard Jouve; Hugo Lapalus; Clément Parisse; Maurice Manificat
**4 × 7.5 km relay**
2026 Milano Cortina	Norway; Emil Iversen; Martin Løwstrøm Nyenget; Einar Hedegart; Johannes Høsflot Klæbo	France; Théo Schely; Hugo Lapalus; Mathis Desloges; Victor Lovera	Italy; Davide Graz; Elia Barp; Martino Carollo; Federico Pellegrino

4x10 km classic style: 1936, 1948–1984. 4x10 km freestyle: 1988. 2x10 km classic style + 2x10 km freestyle: 1992–2022. 2x7.5 km classic style + 2x7.5 km freestyle: 2026.

- Medals:

Rank	Nation	Gold	Silver	Bronze	Total
1	Sweden	**6**	1	4	11
2	Norway	5	**8**	1	**14**
3	Finland	4	3	**6**	13
4	Soviet Union	3	2	3	8
5	Italy	2	3	0	5
6	Germany	0	1	1	2
7	Olympic Athletes from Russia	0	1	0	1
7	Russia	0	1	0	1
9	France	0	0	2	2
10	Czech Republic	0	0	1	1
10	Czechoslovakia	0	0	1	1
10	Switzerland	0	0	1	1
Total		20	20	20	60

=== Combined/double pursuit/Skiathlon ===
Games	Gold	Silver	Bronze
**10 km classical; then 15 km freestyle**
1992 Albertville	Bjørn Dæhlie; Norway	Vegard Ulvang; Norway	Giorgio Vanzetta; Italy
1994 Lillehammer	Bjørn Dæhlie; Norway	Vladimir Smirnov; Kazakhstan	Silvio Fauner; Italy
1998 Nagano	Thomas Alsgaard; Norway	Bjørn Dæhlie; Norway	Vladimir Smirnov; Kazakhstan
**10 km classical; then 10 km freestyle**
2002 Salt Lake City	Thomas Alsgaard; Norway; Frode Estil; Norway	none awarded	Per Elofsson; Sweden
**15 km + 15 km pursuit / skiathlon**
2006 Turin	Yevgeny Dementyev; Russia	Frode Estil; Norway	Pietro Piller Cottrer; Italy
2010 Vancouver	Marcus Hellner; Sweden	Tobias Angerer; Germany	Johan Olsson; Sweden
2014 Sochi	Dario Cologna; Switzerland	Marcus Hellner; Sweden	Martin Johnsrud Sundby; Norway
2018 Pyeongchang	Simen Hegstad Krüger; Norway	Martin Johnsrud Sundby; Norway	Hans Christer Holund; Norway
2022 Beijing	Alexander Bolshunov; ROC	Denis Spitsov; ROC	Iivo Niskanen; Finland
**10 km + 10 km pursuit / skiathlon**
2026 Milano Cortina	Johannes Høsflot Klæbo; Norway	Mathis Desloges; France	Martin Løwstrøm Nyenget; Norway

Medals
Rank	Nation	Gold	Silver	Bronze	Total
1	Norway	7	4	3	14
2	Sweden	1	1	2	4
3	ROC	1	1	0	2
4	Russia	1	0	0	1
4	Switzerland	1	0	0	1
6	Kazakhstan	0	1	1	2
7	Germany	0	1	0	1
7	France	0	1	0	1
9	Italy	0	0	3	1
10	Finland	0	0	1	1
Total	**10 nations**	**10**	**8**	**9**	**27**

=== Individual sprint ===
Games	Gold	Silver	Bronze
2002 Salt Lake City	Tor Arne Hetland; Norway	Peter Schlickenrieder; Germany	Cristian Zorzi; Italy
2006 Turin	Björn Lind; Sweden	Roddy Darragon; France	Thobias Fredriksson; Sweden
2010 Vancouver	Nikita Kryukov; Russia	Alexander Panzhinskiy; Russia	Petter Northug; Norway
2014 Sochi	Ola Vigen Hattestad; Norway	Teodor Peterson; Sweden	Emil Jönsson; Sweden
2018 Pyeongchang	Johannes Høsflot Klæbo; Norway	Federico Pellegrino; Italy	Alexander Bolshunov; Olympic Athletes from Russia
2022 Beijing	Johannes Høsflot Klæbo; Norway	Federico Pellegrino; Italy	Alexander Terentyev; ROC
2026 Milano Cortina	Johannes Høsflot Klæbo; Norway	Ben Ogden; United States	Oskar Opstad Vike; Norway

Classic style: 2010, 2018, 2026. Freestyle: 2002–2006, 2014, 2022.

Medals
Rank	Nation	Gold	Silver	Bronze	Total
1	Norway	5	0	2	7
2	Sweden	1	1	2	4
3	Russia	1	1	0	2
4	Italy	0	2	1	3
5	France	0	1	0	1
5	Germany	0	1	0	1
5	United States	0	1	0	1
5	Olympic Athletes from Russia	0	1	0	1
9	ROC	0	0	1	1
Total	**9 nations**	**7**	**7**	**7**	**21**

=== Team sprint ===
Games	Gold	Silver	Bronze
2006 Turin	Sweden; Thobias Fredriksson; Björn Lind	Norway; Jens Arne Svartedal; Tor Arne Hetland	Russia; Ivan Alypov; Vasily Rochev
2010 Vancouver	Norway; Øystein Pettersen; Petter Northug	Germany; Tim Tscharnke; Axel Teichmann	Russia; Nikolay Morilov; Alexey Petukhov
2014 Sochi	Finland; Iivo Niskanen; Sami Jauhojärvi	Russia; Maxim Vylegzhanin; Nikita Kryukov	Sweden; Emil Jönsson; Teodor Peterson
2018 Pyeongchang	Norway; Martin Johnsrud Sundby; Johannes Høsflot Klæbo	Olympic Athletes from Russia; Denis Spitsov; Alexander Bolshunov	France; Maurice Manificat; Richard Jouve
2022 Beijing	Norway; Erik Valnes; Johannes Høsflot Klæbo	Finland; Iivo Niskanen; Joni Mäki	ROC; Alexander Bolshunov; Alexander Terentyev
2026 Milano Cortina	Norway; Einar Hedegart; Johannes Høsflot Klæbo	United States; Ben Ogden; Gus Schumacher	Italy; Elia Barp; Federico Pellegrino

Classic style: 2006, 2014, 2022. Freestyle: 2010, 2018, 2026.

- Medals:

Rank	Nation	Gold	Silver	Bronze	Total
**1**	Norway	**4**	**1**	0	**5**
**2**	Finland	1	1	0	2
**3**	Sweden	1	0	1	2
**4**	Russia	0	**1**	**2**	**3**
**5**	Germany	0	**1**	0	1
**5**	Olympic Athletes from Russia	0	**1**	0	1
**5**	United States	0	**1**	0	1
**8**	France	0	0	1	1
**8**	ROC	0	0	1	1
**8**	Italy	0	0	1	1
Total		6	6	6	18

== Women ==
=== 10 km ===
Games	Gold	Silver	Bronze
1952 Oslo	Lydia Wideman; Finland	Mirja Hietamies; Finland	Siiri Rantanen; Finland
1956 Cortina d'Ampezzo	Lyubov Kozyreva; Soviet Union	Radya Yeroshina; Soviet Union	Sonja Edström; Sweden
1960 Squaw Valley	Maria Gusakova; Soviet Union	Lyubov Baranova; Soviet Union	Radya Yeroshina; Soviet Union
1964 Innsbruck	Klavdiya Boyarskikh; Soviet Union	Yevdokiya Mekshilo; Soviet Union	Maria Gusakova; Soviet Union
1968 Grenoble	Toini Gustafsson; Sweden	Berit Mørdre; Norway	Inger Aufles; Norway
1972 Sapporo	Galina Kulakova; Soviet Union	Alevtina Olyunina; Soviet Union	Marjatta Kajosmaa; Finland
1976 Innsbruck	Raisa Smetanina; Soviet Union	Helena Takalo; Finland	Galina Kulakova; Soviet Union
1980 Lake Placid	Barbara Petzold; East Germany	Hilkka Riihivuori; Finland	Helena Takalo; Finland
1984 Sarajevo	Marja-Liisa Hämäläinen; Finland	Raisa Smetanina; Soviet Union	Brit Pettersen; Norway
1988 Calgary	Vida Vencienė; Soviet Union	Raisa Smetanina; Soviet Union	Marjo Matikainen; Finland
1992–1998	Not included in the Olympic program		
2002 Salt Lake City	Bente Skari; Norway	Yuliya Chepalova; Russia	Stefania Belmondo; Italy
2006 Turin	Kristina Šmigun; Estonia	Marit Bjørgen; Norway	Hilde Gjermundshaug Pedersen; Norway
2010 Vancouver	Charlotte Kalla; Sweden	Kristina Šmigun-Vähi; Estonia	Marit Bjørgen; Norway
2014 Sochi	Justyna Kowalczyk; Poland	Charlotte Kalla; Sweden	Therese Johaug; Norway
2018 Pyeongchang	Ragnhild Haga; Norway	Charlotte Kalla; Sweden	Marit Bjørgen; Norway; Krista Pärmäkoski; Finland
2022 Beijing	Therese Johaug; Norway	Kerttu Niskanen; Finland	Krista Pärmäkoski; Finland
2026 Milano Cortina	Frida Karlsson; Sweden	Ebba Andersson; Sweden	Jessie Diggins; United States

Classic style: 1952–1988, 2002–2006, 2014, 2022. Freestyle: 2010, 2018, 2026.

Medals
Rank	Nation	Gold	Silver	Bronze	Total
1	Soviet Union	6	6	3	15
2	Norway	3	2	6	11
3	Sweden	3	3	1	7
4	Finland	2	4	6	12
5	Estonia	1	1	0	2
6	East Germany	1	0	0	1
6	Poland	1	0	0	1
8	Russia	0	1	0	1
9	Italy	0	0	1	1
9	United States	0	0	1	1
Total	9 nations	16	16	17	49

=== 20, 30 and 50 km ===
Games	Gold	Silver	Bronze
20 km
1984 Sarajevo	Marja-Liisa Hämäläinen; Finland	Raisa Smetanina; Soviet Union	Anne Jahren; Norway
1988 Calgary	Tamara Tikhonova; Soviet Union	Anfisa Reztsova; Soviet Union	Raisa Smetanina; Soviet Union
30 km
1992 Albertville	Stefania Belmondo; Italy	Lyubov Yegorova; Unified Team	Yelena Välbe; Unified Team
1994 Lillehammer	Manuela Di Centa; Italy	Marit Wold; Norway	Marja-Liisa Kirvesniemi; Finland
1998 Nagano	Yuliya Chepalova; Russia	Stefania Belmondo; Italy	Larisa Lazutina; Russia
2002 Salt Lake City	Gabriella Paruzzi; Italy	Stefania Belmondo; Italy	Bente Skari; Norway
2006 Turin	Kateřina Neumannová; Czech Republic	Yuliya Chepalova; Russia	Justyna Kowalczyk; Poland
2010 Vancouver	Justyna Kowalczyk; Poland	Marit Bjørgen; Norway	Aino-Kaisa Saarinen; Finland
2014 Sochi	Marit Bjørgen; Norway	Therese Johaug; Norway	Kristin Størmer Steira; Norway
2018 Pyeongchang	Marit Bjørgen (2); Norway	Krista Pärmäkoski; Finland	Stina Nilsson; Sweden
2022 Beijing	Therese Johaug; Norway	Jessie Diggins; United States	Kerttu Niskanen; Finland
50 km
2026 Milano Cortina	Ebba Andersson; Sweden	Heidi Weng; Norway	Nadja Kälin; Switzerland

Classic style: 1984, 1994, 2002, 2010, 2018, 2026. Freestyle: 1988–1992, 1998, 2006, 2014, 2022. Mass start: 2006–2026.

- Medals:

Rank	Nation	Gold	Silver	Bronze	Total
1	Norway	3	2	3	8
2	Italy	3	2	0	5
3	Soviet Union	1	3	1	5
4	Finland	1	1	3	5
5	Russia	1	1	1	3
6	Poland	1	0	1	2
7	Czech Republic	1	0	0	1
8	Unified Team	0	1	1	2
9	United States	0	1	0	1
10	Sweden	0	0	1	1
Total		11	11	11	33

=== Relay ===
Games	Gold	Silver	Bronze
3 × 5 km relay
1956 Cortina d'Ampezzo	Finland; Sirkka Polkunen; Mirja Hietamies; Siiri Rantanen	Soviet Union; Lyubov Kozyreva; Alevtina Kolchina; Radya Yeroshina	Sweden; Irma Johansson; Anna-Lisa Eriksson; Sonja Edström
1960 Squaw Valley	Sweden; Irma Johansson; Britt Strandberg; Sonja Edström	Soviet Union; Radya Yeroshina; Maria Gusakova; Lyubov Baranova	Finland; Siiri Rantanen; Eeva Ruoppa; Toini Pöysti
1964 Innsbruck	Soviet Union; Alevtina Kolchina; Yevdokiya Mekshilo; Klavdiya Boyarskikh	Sweden; Barbro Martinsson; Britt Strandberg; Toini Gustafsson	Finland; Senja Pusula; Toini Pöysti; Mirja Lehtonen
1968 Grenoble	Norway; Inger Aufles; Babben Enger Damon; Berit Mørdre	Sweden; Britt Strandberg; Toini Gustafsson; Barbro Martinsson	Soviet Union; Alevtina Kolchina; Rita Achkina; Galina Kulakova
1972 Sapporo	Soviet Union; Lyubov Mukhachyova; Alevtina Olyunina; Galina Kulakova	Finland; Helena Takalo; Hilkka Riihivuori; Marjatta Kajosmaa	Norway; Inger Aufles; Aslaug Dahl; Berit Mørdre
4 × 5 km relay
1976 Innsbruck	Soviet Union; Nina Baldycheva; Zinaida Amosova; Raisa Smetanina; Galina Kulakova	Finland; Liisa Suihkonen; Marjatta Kajosmaa; Hilkka Riihivuori; Helena Takalo	East Germany; Monika Debertshäuser; Sigrun Krause; Barbara Petzold; Veronika Hesse
1980 Lake Placid	East Germany; Marlies Rostock; Carola Anding; Veronika Hesse; Barbara Petzold	Soviet Union; Nina Baldycheva; Nina Rocheva; Galina Kulakova; Raisa Smetanina	Norway; Brit Pettersen; Anette Bøe; Marit Myrmæl; Berit Aunli
1984 Sarajevo	Norway; Inger Helene Nybråten; Anne Jahren; Brit Pettersen; Berit Aunli	Czechoslovakia; Dagmar Švubová; Blanka Paulů; Gabriela Svobodová; Květa Jeriová	Finland; Pirkko Määttä; Eija Hyytiäinen; Marjo Matikainen; Marja-Liisa Hämäläinen
1988 Calgary	Soviet Union; Svetlana Nageykina; Nina Gavrylyuk; Tamara Tikhonova; Anfisa Reztsova	Norway; Trude Dybendahl; Marit Wold; Anne Jahren; Marianne Dahlmo	Finland; Pirkko Määttä; Marja-Liisa Kirvesniemi; Marjo Matikainen; Jaana Savolainen
1992 Albertville	Unified Team; Yelena Välbe; Raisa Smetanina; Larisa Lazutina; Lyubov Yegorova	Norway; Solveig Pedersen; Inger Helene Nybråten; Trude Dybendahl; Elin Nilsen	Italy; Bice Vanzetta; Manuela Di Centa; Gabriella Paruzzi; Stefania Belmondo
1994 Lillehammer	Russia; Yelena Välbe (2); Larisa Lazutina; Nina Gavrylyuk; Lyubov Yegorova	Norway; Trude Dybendahl; Inger Helene Nybråten; Elin Nilsen; Anita Moen	Italy; Bice Vanzetta; Manuela Di Centa; Gabriella Paruzzi; Stefania Belmondo
1998 Nagano	Russia; Nina Gavrylyuk; Olga Danilova; Yelena Välbe; Larisa Lazutina	Norway; Bente Martinsen; Marit Mikkelsplass; Elin Nilsen; Anita Moen-Guidon	Italy; Karin Moroder; Gabriella Paruzzi; Manuela Di Centa; Stefania Belmondo
2002 Salt Lake City	Germany; Manuela Henkel; Viola Bauer; Claudia Künzel; Evi Sachenbacher	Norway; Marit Bjørgen; Bente Skari; Hilde Gjermundshaug Pedersen; Anita Moen	Switzerland; Andrea Huber; Laurence Rochat; Brigitte Albrecht-Loretan; Natascia Leonardi Cortesi
2006 Turin	Russia; Natalya Baranova-Masalkina; Larisa Kurkina; Yuliya Chepalova; Yevgeniya Medvedeva-Arbuzova	Germany; Stefanie Böhler; Viola Bauer; Evi Sachenbacher-Stehle; Claudia Künzel	Italy; Arianna Follis; Gabriella Paruzzi; Antonella Confortola; Sabina Valbusa
2010 Vancouver	Norway; Vibeke Skofterud; Therese Johaug; Kristin Størmer Steira; Marit Bjørgen	Germany; Katrin Zeller; Evi Sachenbacher-Stehle; Miriam Gössner; Claudia Nystad	Finland; Pirjo Muranen; Virpi Kuitunen; Riitta-Liisa Roponen; Aino-Kaisa Saarinen
2014 Sochi	Sweden; Ida Ingemarsdotter; Emma Wikén; Anna Haag; Charlotte Kalla	Finland; Anne Kyllönen; Aino-Kaisa Saarinen; Kerttu Niskanen; Krista Lähteenmäki	Germany; Nicole Fessel; Stefanie Böhler; Claudia Nystad; Denise Herrmann
2018 Pyeongchang	Norway; Ingvild Flugstad Østberg; Astrid Uhrenholdt Jacobsen; Ragnhild Haga; Marit Bjørgen	Sweden; Anna Haag; Charlotte Kalla; Ebba Andersson; Stina Nilsson	Olympic Athletes from Russia; Natalya Nepryayeva; Yuliya Belorukova; Anastasia Sedova; Anna Nechaevskaya
2022 Beijing	ROC; Yuliya Stupak; Natalya Nepryayeva; Tatiana Sorina; Veronika Stepanova	Germany; Katherine Sauerbrey; Katharina Hennig; Victoria Carl; Sofie Krehl	Sweden; Maja Dahlqvist; Ebba Andersson; Frida Karlsson; Jonna Sundling
4 × 7.5 km relay
2026 Milan Cortina	Norway; Kristin Austgulen Fosnæs; Astrid Øyre Slind; Karoline Simpson-Larsen; Heidi Weng	Sweden; Linn Svahn; Ebba Andersson; Frida Karlsson; Jonna Sundling	Finland; Johanna Matintalo; Kerttu Niskanen; Vilma Ryytty; Jasmi Joensuu

3 × 5 km classic style: 1956–1972. 4 x 5 km classic style: 1976–1984. 4 × 5 km freestyle: 1988. 2 × 5 km classic style + 2 × 5 km freestyle: 1992–2022. 2 × 7.5 km classic style + 2 × 7.5 km freestyle: 2026.

Medals
Rank	Nation	Gold	Silver	Bronze	Total
1	Norway	5	5	2	12
2	Soviet Union	4	3	1	8
3	Russia	3	0	0	3
4	Sweden	2	4	2	8
5	Finland	1	3	6	10
6	Germany	1	3	1	5
7	East Germany	1	0	1	2
8	ROC	1	0	0	1
8	Unified Team	1	0	0	1
10	Czechoslovakia	0	1	0	1
11	Italy	0	0	4	4
12	Olympic Athletes from Russia	0	0	1	1
12	Switzerland	0	0	1	1
Total	13 nations	19	19	19	57

=== Combined/double pursuit/Skiathlon ===
Games	Gold	Silver	Bronze
5 km classical; then 10 km freestyle
1992 Albertville	Lyubov Yegorova; Unified Team	Stefania Belmondo; Italy	Yelena Välbe; Unified Team
1994 Lillehammer	Lyubov Yegorova (2); Russia	Manuela Di Centa; Italy	Stefania Belmondo; Italy
1998 Nagano	Larisa Lazutina; Russia	Olga Danilova; Russia	Kateřina Neumannová; Czech Republic
5 km classical; then 5 km freestyle
2002 Salt Lake City	Beckie Scott; Canada	Kateřina Neumannová; Czech Republic	Viola Bauer; Germany
7.5 km classical; then 7.5 km freestyle
2006 Turin	Kristina Šmigun; Estonia	Kateřina Neumannová; Czech Republic	Yevgeniya Medvedeva-Arbuzova; Russia
2010 Vancouver	Marit Bjørgen; Norway	Anna Haag; Sweden	Justyna Kowalczyk; Poland
2014 Sochi	Marit Bjørgen (2); Norway	Charlotte Kalla; Sweden	Heidi Weng; Norway
2018 Pyeongchang	Charlotte Kalla; Sweden	Marit Bjørgen; Norway	Krista Pärmäkoski; Finland
2022 Beijing	Therese Johaug; Norway	Natalya Nepryayeva; ROC	Teresa Stadlober; Austria
10 km classical; then 10 km freestyle
2026 Milano Cortina	Frida Karlsson; Sweden	Ebba Andersson; Sweden	Heidi Weng; Norway

Medals
Rank	Nation	Gold	Silver	Bronze	Total
1	Sweden	2	3	0	3
2	Norway	2	1	2	4
2	Russia	2	1	1	4
4	Unified Team	1	0	1	1
5	Canada	1	0	0	1
5	Estonia	1	0	0	1
7	Czech Republic	0	2	1	3
7	Italy	0	2	1	3
8	Finland	0	0	1	1
8	Germany	0	0	1	1
8	Poland	0	0	1	1
Total	11 nations	9	9	9	27

=== Individual sprint ===
Games	Gold	Silver	Bronze
2002 Salt Lake City	Yuliya Chepalova; Russia	Evi Sachenbacher; Germany	Anita Moen; Norway
2006 Turin	Chandra Crawford; Canada	Claudia Künzel; Germany	Alyona Sidko; Russia
2010 Vancouver	Marit Bjørgen; Norway	Justyna Kowalczyk; Poland	Petra Majdič; Slovenia
2014 Sochi	Maiken Caspersen Falla; Norway	Ingvild Flugstad Østberg; Norway	Vesna Fabjan; Slovenia
2018 Pyeongchang	Stina Nilsson; Sweden	Maiken Caspersen Falla; Norway	Yuliya Belorukova; Olympic Athletes from Russia
2022 Beijing	Jonna Sundling; Sweden	Maja Dahlqvist; Sweden	Jessie Diggins; United States
2026 Milano Cortina	Linn Svahn; Sweden	Jonna Sundling; Sweden	Maja Dahlqvist; Sweden

Classic style: 2010, 2018, 2026. Freestyle: 2002–2006, 2014, 2022.

Medals
Rank	Nation	Gold	Silver	Bronze	Total
1	Sweden	3	2	1	6
2	Norway	2	2	1	5
3	Russia	1	0	1	2
4	Canada	1	0	0	1
5	Germany	0	2	0	2
6	Poland	0	1	0	1
7	Slovenia	0	0	2	2
8	Olympic Athletes from Russia	0	0	1	1
8	United States	0	0	1	1
Total	9 nations	6	6	6	18

=== Team sprint ===
Games	Gold	Silver	Bronze
2006 Turin	Sweden; Anna Dahlberg; Lina Andersson	Canada; Sara Renner; Beckie Scott	Finland; Aino-Kaisa Saarinen; Virpi Kuitunen
2010 Vancouver	Germany; Evi Sachenbacher-Stehle; Claudia Nystad	Sweden; Charlotte Kalla; Anna Haag	Russia; Irina Khazova; Natalya Korostelyova
2014 Sochi	Norway; Ingvild Flugstad Østberg; Marit Bjørgen	Finland; Aino-Kaisa Saarinen; Kerttu Niskanen	Sweden; Ida Ingemarsdotter; Stina Nilsson
2018 Pyeongchang	United States; Kikkan Randall; Jessie Diggins	Sweden; Charlotte Kalla; Stina Nilsson	Norway; Marit Bjørgen; Maiken Caspersen Falla
2022 Beijing	Germany; Katharina Hennig; Victoria Carl	Sweden; Maja Dahlqvist; Jonna Sundling	ROC; Yuliya Stupak; Natalya Nepryayeva
2026 Milano Cortina	Sweden; Maja Dahlqvist; Jonna Sundling	Switzerland; Nadja Kälin; Nadine Fähndrich	Germany; Laura Gimmler; Coletta Rydzek

Classic style: 2006, 2014, 2022. Freestyle: 2010, 2018, 2026.

- Medals:

Rank	Nation	Gold	Silver	Bronze	Total
1	Sweden	2	3	1	6
2	Germany	2	0	1	3
3	Norway	1	0	1	2
4	United States	1	0	0	1
5	Finland	0	1	1	2
7	Canada	0	1	0	1
7	Switzerland	0	1	0	1
10	ROC	0	0	1	1
10	Russia	0	0	1	1
Total	9 Nations	6	6	6	18

== Discontinued ==
=== Men's 30 km ===
This event ran from 1956 to 2002 and was replaced by a 30 km skiathlon (15 km classical + 15 km freestyle) for the 2006 Winter Olympics.

Games	Gold	Silver	Bronze
1956 Cortina d'Ampezzo	Veikko Hakulinen; Finland	Sixten Jernberg; Sweden	Pavel Kolchin; Soviet Union
1960 Squaw Valley	Sixten Jernberg; Sweden	Rolf Rämgård; Sweden	Nikolay Anikin; Soviet Union
1964 Innsbruck	Eero Mäntyranta; Finland	Harald Grønningen; Norway	Igor Voronchikhin; Soviet Union
1968 Grenoble	Franco Nones; Italy	Odd Martinsen; Norway	Eero Mäntyranta; Finland
1972 Sapporo	Vyacheslav Vedenin; Soviet Union	Pål Tyldum; Norway	Johs Harviken; Norway
1976 Innsbruck	Sergey Savelyev; Soviet Union	Bill Koch; United States	Ivan Garanin; Soviet Union
1980 Lake Placid	Nikolay Zimyatov; Soviet Union	Vasily Rochev; Soviet Union	Ivan Lebanov; Bulgaria
1984 Sarajevo	Nikolay Zimyatov (2); Soviet Union	Alexander Zavyalov; Soviet Union	Gunde Svan; Sweden
1988 Calgary	Alexey Prokurorov; Soviet Union	Vladimir Smirnov; Soviet Union	Vegard Ulvang; Norway
1992 Albertville	Vegard Ulvang; Norway	Bjørn Dæhlie; Norway	Terje Langli; Norway
1994 Lillehammer	Thomas Alsgaard; Norway	Bjørn Dæhlie; Norway	Mika Myllylä; Finland
1998 Nagano	Mika Myllylä; Finland	Erling Jevne; Norway	Silvio Fauner; Italy
2002 Salt Lake City	Christian Hoffmann; Austria	Mikhail Botvinov; Austria	Kristen Skjeldal; Norway

Classic style: 1956–1992, 1998. Freestyle: 1994, 2002. Mass start: 2002.

- Medals:

Rank	Nation	Gold	Silver	Bronze	Total
1	Soviet Union	5	3	4	12
2	Finland	3	0	2	5
3	Norway	2	6	4	12
4	Sweden	1	2	1	4
5	Austria	1	1	0	2
6	Italy	1	0	1	2
7	United States	0	1	0	1
8	Bulgaria	0	0	1	1
Total		13	13	13	39

=== Women's 5 km ===
The 5 km event ran from 1964 to 1998 before being replaced by the 10 km event, which was reintroduced after the 10 km had been discontinued following the 1988 Winter Olympics.

Games	Gold	Silver	Bronze
1964 Innsbruck	Klavdiya Boyarskikh; Soviet Union	Mirja Lehtonen; Finland	Alevtina Kolchina; Soviet Union
1968 Grenoble	Toini Gustafsson; Sweden	Galina Kulakova; Soviet Union	Alevtina Kolchina; Soviet Union
1972 Sapporo	Galina Kulakova; Soviet Union	Marjatta Kajosmaa; Finland	Helena Šikolová; Czechoslovakia
1976 Innsbruck	Helena Takalo; Finland	Raisa Smetanina; Soviet Union	Nina Baldycheva; Soviet Union
1980 Lake Placid	Raisa Smetanina; Soviet Union	Hilkka Riihivuori; Finland	Květa Jeriová; Czechoslovakia
1984 Sarajevo	Marja-Liisa Hämäläinen; Finland	Berit Aunli; Norway	Květa Jeriová; Czechoslovakia
1988 Calgary	Marjo Matikainen; Finland	Tamara Tikhonova; Soviet Union	Vida Vencienė; Soviet Union
1992 Albertville	Marjut Lukkarinen; Finland	Lyubov Yegorova; Unified Team	Yelena Välbe; Unified Team
1994 Lillehammer	Lyubov Yegorova; Russia	Manuela Di Centa; Italy	Marja-Liisa Kirvesniemi; Finland
1998 Nagano	Larisa Lazutina; Russia	Kateřina Neumannová; Czech Republic	Bente Martinsen; Norway

Classic style: 1964–1998.

- Medals:

Rank	Nation	Gold	Silver	Bronze	Total
1	Finland	4	3	1	8
2	Soviet Union	3	3	4	10
3	Russia	2	0	0	2
4	Sweden	1	0	0	1
5	Norway	0	1	1	2
5	Unified Team	0	1	1	2
7	Czech Republic	0	1	0	1
7	Italy	0	1	0	1
9	Czechoslovakia	0	0	3	3
Total		10	10	10	30

=== Women's 15 km ===
This event ran from 1992 to 2002 and was replaced by a 15 km skiathlon (7.5 km classical + 7.5 km freestyle) for the 2006 Winter Olympics.

Games	Gold	Silver	Bronze
1992 Albertville	Lyubov Yegorova; Unified Team	Marjut Lukkarinen; Finland	Yelena Välbe; Unified Team
1994 Lillehammer	Manuela Di Centa; Italy	Lyubov Yegorova; Russia	Nina Gavrylyuk; Russia
1998 Nagano	Olga Danilova; Russia	Larisa Lazutina; Russia	Anita Moen-Guidon; Norway
2002 Salt Lake City	Stefania Belmondo; Italy	Kateřina Neumannová; Czech Republic	Yuliya Chepalova; Russia

Classic style: 1992, 1998. Freestyle: 1994, 2002. Mass start: 2002.

- Medals:

Rank	Nation	Gold	Silver	Bronze	Total
1	Italy	2	0	0	2
2	Russia	1	2	2	5
3	Unified Team	1	0	1	2
4	Czech Republic	0	1	0	1
4	Finland	0	1	0	1
6	Norway	0	0	1	1
Total		4	4	4	12

== Statistics ==
=== Medal table ===
Rank	Nation	Gold	Silver	Bronze	Total
1	Norway	52	43	35	130
2	Sweden	33	28	25	86
3	Soviet Union	25	22	21	68
4	Finland	22	27	37	86
5	Russia	14	10	9	33
6	Italy	9	14	13	36
7	ROC	4	4	3	11
8	Estonia	4	2	1	7
9	Switzerland	4	0	4	8
10	Germany	3	10	4	17
11	Unified Team	3	2	4	9
12	Poland	2	1	2	5
13	East Germany	2	1	1	4
14	Canada	2	1	0	3
15	Czech Republic	1	5	3	9
16	Austria	1	2	3	6
17	Kazakhstan	1	2	1	4
17	United States	1	2	1	4
19	Olympic Athletes from Russia	0	3	5	8
20	Czechoslovakia	0	1	4	5
20	France	0	1	4	5
22	Slovenia	0	0	2	2
23	Bulgaria	0	0	1	1
Totals (23 entries)		**183**	**181**	**183**	**547**

=== Cross-country skier medal leaders ===
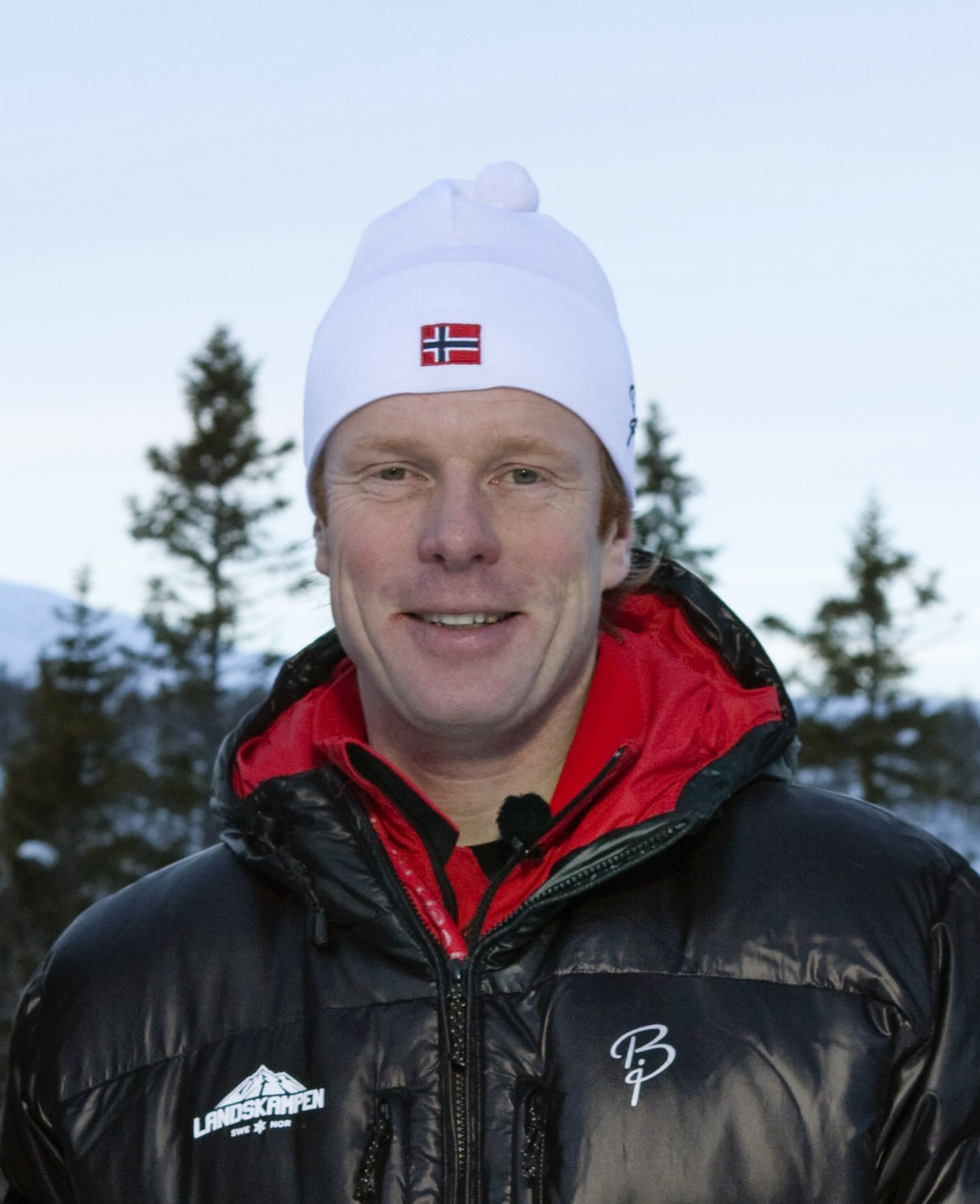
Bjørn Dæhlie is the 2nd most successful male cross-country skier at Winter Olympics. He is one of four Winter Olympians (and one of three male Olympians) to win eight or more gold medals, behind only Klæbo.

Men

Cross-country skier	Nation	Olympics *	Gold	Silver	Bronze	Total
**Johannes Høsflot Klæbo**	Norway	2018–**2026**	11	1	1	13
Bjørn Dæhlie	Norway	1992–1998	8	4	0	12
Sixten Jernberg	Sweden	1956–1964	4	3	2	9
**Alexander Bolshunov**	Olympic Athletes from Russia; ROC	2018–**2022**	3	4	2	9
Veikko Hakulinen	Finland	1952–1960	3	3	1	7
Eero Mäntyranta	Finland	1960–1972	3	2	2	7
Vladimir Smirnov	Soviet Union; Unified Team; Kazakhstan	1988–1998	1	4	2	7
Thomas Alsgaard	Norway	1994–2002	5	1	0	6
Gunde Svan	Sweden	1984–1988	4	1	1	6
Vegard Ulvang	Norway	1988–1994	3	2	1	6
Johan Olsson	Sweden	2006–2014	2	1	3	6
Mika Myllylä	Finland	1992–1998	1	1	4	6
Harri Kirvesniemi	Finland	1980–1998	0	0	6	6

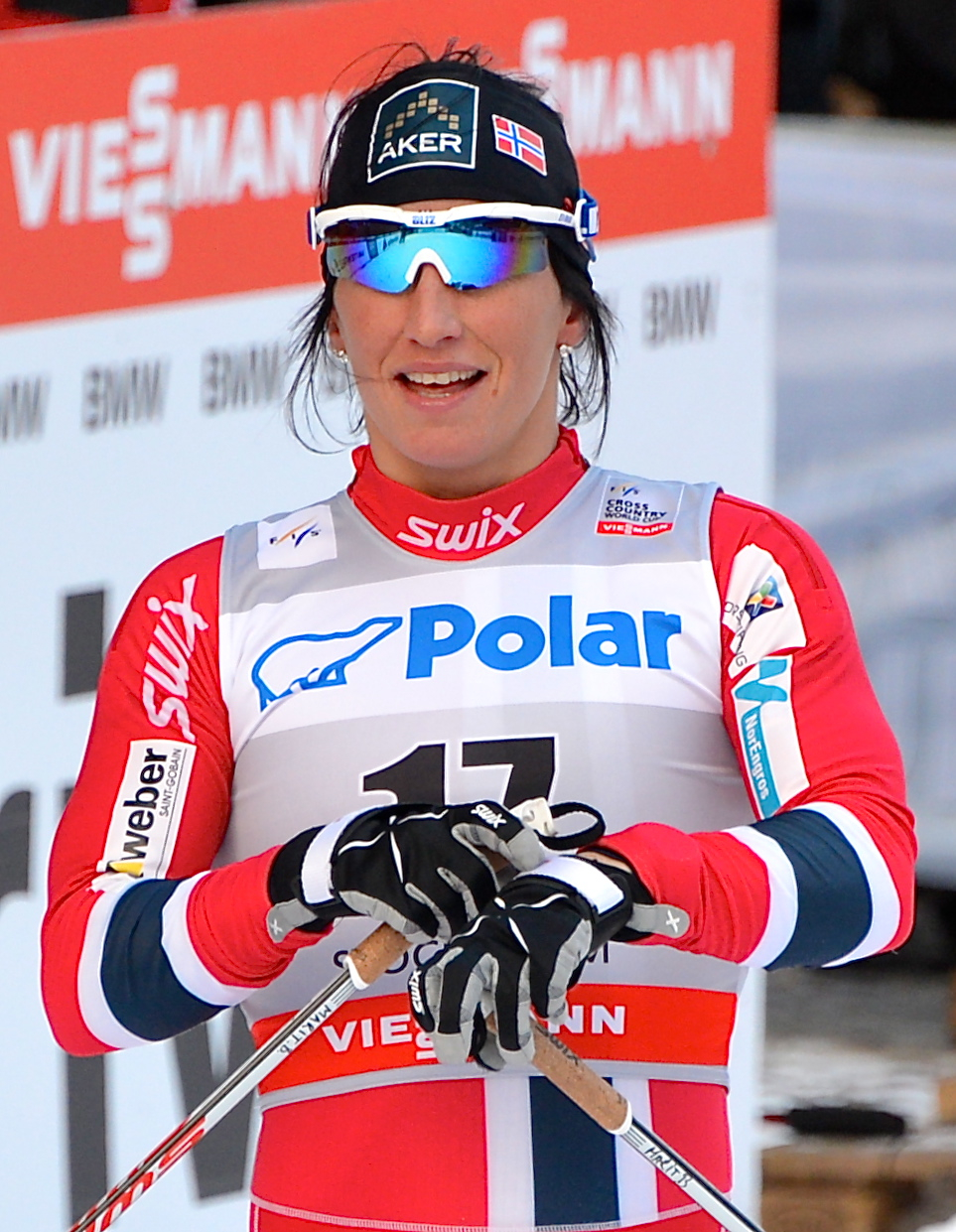
Marit Bjørgen is the most successful Winter Olympian of all time. She is one of three Winter Olympians (and only woman) to win eight gold medals. In total, she won 15 Olympic medals – more than any athlete (male or female) in the history of Winter Olympics.

Women

Cross-country skier	Nation	Olympics *	Gold	Silver	Bronze	Total
Marit Bjørgen	Norway	2002–2018	8	4	3	15
Raisa Smetanina	Soviet Union; Unified Team	1976–1992	4	5	1	10
Stefania Belmondo	Italy	1988–2002	2	3	5	10
Lyubov Yegorova	Unified Team; Russia	1992–1994, 2002	6	3	0	9
Charlotte Kalla	Sweden	2010–**2022**	3	6	0	9
Galina Kulakova	Soviet Union	1968–1980	4	2	2	8
Larisa Lazutina	Unified Team; Russia	1992–2002	5	1	1	7
Marja-Liisa Kirvesniemi (Hämäläinen)	Finland	1976–1994	3	0	4	7
Yelena Välbe	Unified Team; Russia	1992–1998	3	0	4	7
Manuela Di Centa	Italy	1984–1998	2	2	3	7

* denotes all Olympics in which mentioned cross-country skiers took part. Boldface denotes latest Olympics.

=== Cross-country skiers with most victories ===
Top 10 cross-country skiers who won more gold medals at the Winter Olympics are listed below. Boldface denotes active cross-country skiers and highest medal count among all cross-country skiers (including these who not included in these tables) per type.

==== Men ====
Rank	Cross-country skier	Country	From *	To *	Gold	Silver	Bronze	Total
1	**Johannes Høsflot Klæbo**	Norway	2018	2026	11	1	1	13
2	Bjørn Dæhlie	Norway	1992	1998	**8**	**4**	-	**12**
3	Thomas Alsgaard	Norway	1994	2002	5	1	-	6
4	Sixten Jernberg	Sweden	1956	1964	4	3	2	9
5	Gunde Svan	Sweden	1984	1988	4	1	1	6
6	Nikolay Zimyatov	Soviet Union	1980	1984	4	1	-	5
7	Dario Cologna	Switzerland	2010	2018	4	-	-	4
7	Thomas Wassberg	Sweden	1980	1988	4	-	-	4
9	**Alexander Bolshunov**	Olympic Athletes from Russia; ROC	2018	2022	3	**4**	2	9
10	Veikko Hakulinen	Finland	1952	1960	3	3	1	7

==== Women ====
Rank	Cross-country skier	Country	From *	To *	Gold	Silver	Bronze	Total
1	Marit Bjørgen	Norway	2002	2018	**8**	4	3	**15**
2	Lyubov Yegorova	Unified Team; Russia	1992	1994	6	3	-	9
3	Larisa Lazutina	Unified Team; Russia	1992	1998	5	1	1	7
4	Raisa Smetanina	Soviet Union; Unified Team	1976	1992	4	5	1	10
5	Galina Kulakova	Soviet Union	1968	1980	4	2	2	8
6	**Therese Johaug**	Norway	2010	2022	4	1	1	6
7	Charlotte Kalla	Sweden	2010	2018	3	**6**	-	9
8	Yuliya Chepalova	Russia	1998	2006	3	2	1	6
9	Marja-Liisa Kirvesniemi (Hämäläinen)	Finland	1984	1994	3	-	4	7
9	Yelena Välbe	Unified Team; Russia	1992	1998	3	-	4	7

* denotes only those Olympics at which mentioned skiers won at least one medal

=== Medals per year ===
NOC did not exist or did not participate in cross-country skiing events	#	Number of medals won by the NOC	–	NOC did not win any medals

- **Bold**ed numbers indicate the highest medal count at that year's Olympic Games.

Country	24	28	32	36	48	52	56	60	64	68	72	76	80	84	88	92	94	98	02	06	10	14	18	22	Total	
Austria		–	–	–	–	–	–		–	–	–	–		–	–	–	–	2	2	1	–	–	–	1	6	
Bulgaria				–	–	–	–	–	–	–	–	–	1	–	–	–	–	–	–	–	–	–	–	–	1	
Canada		–	–	–	–	–	–	–	–	–	–	–	–	–	–	–	–	–	1	2	–	–	–	–	3	
Czech Republic																	–	2	2	3	2	–	–	–	9	
Czechoslovakia	–	–	–	–	–	–	–	–	–	–	1	–	1	2	1	–									5	
East Germany										–	–	2	2	–	–										4	
Estonia				–												–	–	–	3	3	1	–	–	–	7	
Finland	1	–	**3**	2	2	**8**	4	5	6	3	3	5	6	**8**	3	3	5	3	–	1	2	3	4	6	86	
France	–	–	–	–	–	–	–	–	–	–	–	–	–	–	–	–	–	–	–	1	–	1	2	1	5	
Germany		–		–		–										–	–	–	5	4	5	1	–	2	17	
Italy	–	–	–	–	–	–	–	–	–	1	–	–	–	–	1	8	**9**	4	6	4	1	–	1	1	36	
Kazakhstan																	3	1	–	–	–	–	–	–	4	
Norway	**5**	**3**	1	2	1	3	1	2	2	**7**	7	2	3	4	3	**9**	8	**9**	**11**	4	**9**	**11**	**14**	8	**129**	
Olympic Athletes from Russia																							8		8	
Poland	–	–	–	–	–	–	–	–	–	–	–	–	–	–		–	–	–	–	1	3	1	–	–	5	
ROC																								**11**	11	
Russia																	5	8	4	**7**	4	5			33	
Slovenia																–		–	–	–	1	1	–	–	2	
Soviet Union							**7**	**6**	**8**	4	**8**	**10**	**7**	5	**13**										68	
Sweden	–	**3**	2	**5**	**6**	1	6	5	5	5	1	1	1	5	2	1	–	1	1	5	7	**11**	6	4	84	
Switzerland	–	–		–	–	–	–	–	–	1	1	–	–	–	1	–	–	–	1	–	1	2	1	–	8	
Unified Team																**9**									9	
United States	–	–	–	–	–	–	–	–	–	–	–	1	–	–	–	–	–	–	–	–	–	–	1	2	4	
**Year**	24	28	32	36	48	52	56	60	64	68	72	76	80	84	88	92	94	98	02	06	10	14	18	22	26	–

=== Medal sweep events ===
These are the podium sweeps; events in which athletes from one NOC won all three medals.

Games	Event	**NOC**	Gold	Silver	Bronze
1924 Chamonix	Men's 50 Kilometers *	Norway	Thorleif Haug	Thoralf Strømstad	Johan Grøttumsbråten
1928 St. Moritz	Men's 50 Kilometers	Sweden	Per-Erik Hedlund	Gustaf Jonsson	Volger Andersson
1928 St. Moritz	Men's 18 Kilometers	Norway	Johan Grøttumsbråten	Ole Hegge	Reidar Ødegaard
1936 Garmisch-Partenkirchen	Men's 50 Kilometers *	Sweden	Elis Wiklund	Axel Wikström	Nils-Joel Englund
1948 St. Moritz	Men's 18 Kilometers	Sweden	Martin Lundström	Nils Östensson	Gunnar Eriksson
1952 Oslo	Women's 10 Kilometers	Finland	Lydia Wideman	Mirja Hietamies	Siiri Rantanen
1960 Squaw Valley	Women's 10 Kilometers *	Soviet Union	Maria Gusakova	Lyubov Baranova	Radya Yeroshina
1964 Innsbruck	Women's 10 Kilometers	Soviet Union	Klavdiya Boyarskikh	Yevdokiya Mekshilo	Maria Gusakova
1988 Calgary	Women's 20 Kilometers	Soviet Union	Tamara Tikhonova	Anfisa Reztsova	Raisa Smetanina
1992 Albertville	Men's 30 Kilometers	Norway	Vegard Ulvang	Bjørn Dæhlie	Terje Langli
2014 Sochi	Women's 30 Kilometers	Norway	Marit Bjørgen	Therese Johaug	Kristin Størmer Steira
2014 Sochi	Men's 50 Kilometers	Russia	Alexander Legkov	Maxim Vylegzhanin	Ilia Chernousov
2018 Pyeongchang	Men's 30 Kilometers skiathlon	Norway	Simen Hegstad Krüger	Martin Johnsrud Sundby	Hans Christer Holund
2026 Milano Cortina	Women's sprint	Sweden	Linn Svahn	Jonna Sundling	Maja Dahlqvist
2026 Milano Cortina	Men's 50 Kilometers	Norway	Johannes Høsflot Klæbo	Martin Løwstrøm Nyenget	Emil Iversen

- ^{*} In addition to sweeping the podium, the country also had the fourth-place finisher.

=== Multiple medals at one Olympic Games – men ===
- 6 medals:
  - out of 6 possible:
    - 2026 Johannes Høsflot Klæbo (Norway)
- 5 medals:
  - out of 6 possible:
    - 2022 Alexander Bolshunov (Russia)
- 4 medals:
  - out of 4 possible:
    - 1984 Gunde Svan (Sweden)
    - 1956 Sixten Jernberg (Sweden)
  - out of 5 possible:
    - 1992 Vegard Ulvang (Norway)
    - 1992 Bjørn Dæhlie (Norway)
    - 1998 Bjørn Dæhlie (Norway)
    - 1994 Bjørn Dæhlie (Norway)
  - out of 6 possible:
    - 2010 Petter Northug (Norway)
    - 2022 Johannes Høsflot Klæbo (Norway)
    - 2018 Alexander Bolshunov (International Olympic Committee)
- 3 medals:
  - out of 3 possible: none
  - out of 4 possible:
    - 1980 Nikolay Zimyatov (Soviet Union)
    - 1964 Eero Mäntyranta (Finland)
    - 1964 Sixten Jernberg (Sweden)
    - 1972 Vyacheslav Vedenin (Soviet Union)
    - 1956 Veikko Hakulinen (Finland)
    - 1972 Pål Tyldum (Norway)
    - 1960 Veikko Hakulinen (Finland)
    - 1956 Pavel Kolchin (Soviet Union)
    - 1980 Juha Mieto (Finland)
    - 1988 Vladimir Smirnov (Soviet Union)
    - 1968 Eero Mäntyranta (Finland)
    - 1984 Aki Karvonen (Finland)
- 2 medals out of 2 possible:
  - 1924 Thorleif Haug (Norway) (+ in Nordic Combined)
  - 1928 Johan Grøttumsbråten (Norway) (one Gold in Cross Country + one in Nordic Combined)
  - 1932 Veli Saarinen (Finland)
  - 1924 Johan Grøttumsbråten (Norway) (+ in Nordic Combined)

=== Multiple medals at one Olympic Games – women ===
- 5 medals:
  - out of 5 possible:
    - 1992 Lyubov Yegorova (International Olympic Committee)
    - 1988 Larisa Lazutina (Russia)
    - 1994 Manuela Di Centa (Italy)
    - 1992 Yelena Välbe (International Olympic Committee)
  - out of 6 possible:
    - 2010 Marit Bjørgen (Norway)
    - 2018 Marit Bjørgen (Norway) (one shared)
- 4 medals:
  - out of 4 possible:
    - 1984 Marja-Liisa Kirvesniemi (Finland)
  - out of 5 possible:
    - 1994 Lyubov Yegorova (Russia)
  - out of 6 possible:
    - 2018 Charlotte Kalla (Sweden)
    - 2018 Stina Nilsson (Sweden)
- 3 medals:
  - out of 3 possible:
    - 1964 Klavdiya Boyarskikh (Soviet Union)
    - 1972 Galina Kulakova (Soviet Union)
    - 1968 Toini Gustafsson (Sweden)
    - 1976 Raisa Smetanina (Soviet Union)
    - 1976 Helena Takalo (Finland)
    - 1972 Marjatta Kajosmaa (Finland)
  - out of 4 possible:
    - 1988 Tamara Tikhonova (Soviet Union)
    - 1988 Marjo Matikainen (Finland)
- 2 medals out of 2 possible:
  - 1956 Lyubov Kozyreva (Soviet Union)
  - 1960 Maria Gusakova (Soviet Union)
  - 1956 Radya Yeroshina (Soviet Union)
  - 1960 Lyubov Baranova (Soviet Union)
  - 1960 Radya Yeroshina (Soviet Union)
  - 1956 Sonja Edström (Sweden)

== See also ==
- List of FIS Nordic World Ski Championships medalists in men's cross-country skiing
- List of FIS Nordic World Ski Championships medalists in women's cross-country skiing
