= List of 1948 Winter Olympics medal winners =

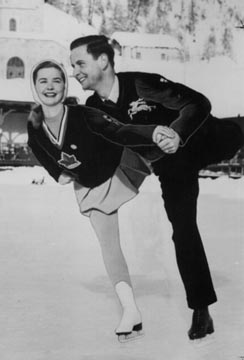
Barbara-Ann Scott of Canada and Hans Gerschwiler of Switzerland practice pairs figure skating before competition.

The 1948 Winter Olympics, officially known by the International Olympic Committee as the V Olympic Winter Games, were a multi-sport event held in St. Moritz, Switzerland, from January 30 through February 8, 1948. A total of 669 athletes representing 28 National Olympic Committees (NOCs) participated at the Games in twenty two events across eight disciplines.

The Olympic programme was adjusted from that of the 1936 Winter Olympics with the addition of skeleton for men. The sport had first appeared at the 1928 Winter Olympics, which had also taken place in St. Moritz, but would not make another appearance until 2002 in Salt Lake City. Two demonstration sports were held in St. Moritz, winter pentathlon and military patrol. This was the fourth time military patrol had been held as a demonstration event, the closely related sport of biathlon was added to the programme beginning with the 1960 Squaw Valley Olympics. Both men and women competed in the 1948 Games, with women taking part in alpine skiing and figure skating.

A total of 123 athletes won medals at the 1948 Games. Norway, Sweden and Switzerland tied for the most number of medals, with ten each. The United States placed fourth in the medal count, with nine, and Austria placed fifth, with eight. Of the 28 competing NOCs, 13 won at least one medal, with 10 of these winning at least one gold. Notable absences from these Games were defeated Axis powers members Germany and Japan, who were not invited to St. Moritz or the London Summer Olympics later in the year in light of the recently concluded World War II. The Soviet Union, who did not form an NOC until 1951, declined to take part.

Sweden repeated its success in cross-country skiing, winning all three medals in the Men's 18 km event and all three gold medals available in the sport. Canadian teenager Barbara-Ann Scott became the first from her nation to win an Olympic gold medal in figure skating, and Dick Button from the United States did the same. Alpine skier Henri Oreiller from France won the most medals with a total of three, with two gold medals from the downhill and combined events, and a bronze in the slalom event.

== Alpine skiing ==
Event	Gold	Silver	Bronze
Men's downhill	Henri Oreiller; France	Franz Gabl; Austria	Rolf Olinger; Switzerland
Men's downhill	Henri Oreiller; France	Franz Gabl; Austria	Karl Molitor; Switzerland
Women's downhill	Hedy Schlunegger; Switzerland	Trude Beiser; Austria	Resi Hammerer; Austria
Men's slalom	Edy Reinalter; Switzerland	James Couttet; France	Henri Oreiller; France
Women's slalom	Gretchen Fraser; United States	Antoinette Meyer; Switzerland	Erika Mahringer; Austria
Men's combined	Henri Oreiller; France	Karl Molitor; Switzerland	James Couttet; France
Women's combined	Trude Beiser; Austria	Gretchen Fraser; United States	Erika Mahringer; Austria

== Bobsleigh ==
Event	Gold	Silver	Bronze
Two-man	Switzerland; Switzerland II; Felix Endrich; Friedrich Waller	Switzerland; Switzerland I Fritz Feierabend; Paul Eberhard	United States; USA II; Frederick Fortune; Schuyler Carron
Four-man	United States; USA II; Francis Tyler; Patrick Martin; Edward Rimkus; William D'Amico	Belgium; Belgium I Max Houben; Freddy Mansveld; Louis-Georges Niels; Jacques Mouvet	United States; USA I James Bickford; Thomas Hicks; Donald Dupree; William Dupree

== Cross-country skiing ==
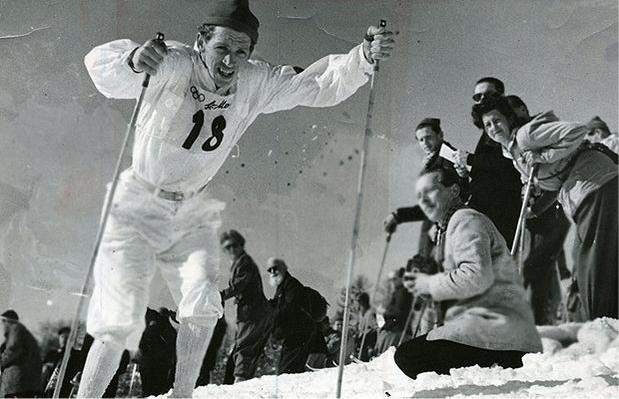
Swedish cross-country skier Martin Lundström during the Men's 18 km event. Lundström went on to win the gold medal in this event.

Event	Gold	Silver	Bronze
18 km	Martin Lundström; Sweden	Nils Östensson; Sweden	Gunnar Eriksson; Sweden
50 km	Nils Karlsson; Sweden	Harald Eriksson; Sweden	Benjamin Vanninen; Finland
4×10 km	Sweden; Gunnar Eriksson; Martin Lundström; Nils Östensson; Nils Täpp	Finland; August Kiuru; Teuvo Laukkanen; Sauli Rytky; Lauri Silvennoinen	Norway; Erling Evensen; Olav Hagen; Reidar Nyborg; Olav Økern

== Figure skating ==
Event	Gold	Silver	Bronze
Men's singles	Dick Button; United States	Hans Gerschwiler; Switzerland	Edi Rada; Austria
Ladies' singles	Barbara-Ann Scott; Canada	Eva Pawlik; Austria	Jeannette Altwegg; Great Britain
Pairs	Belgium; Pierre Baugniet; Micheline Lannoy	Hungary; Andrea Kékesy; Ede Király	Canada; Wallace Diestelmeyer; Suzanne Morrow

== Ice hockey ==
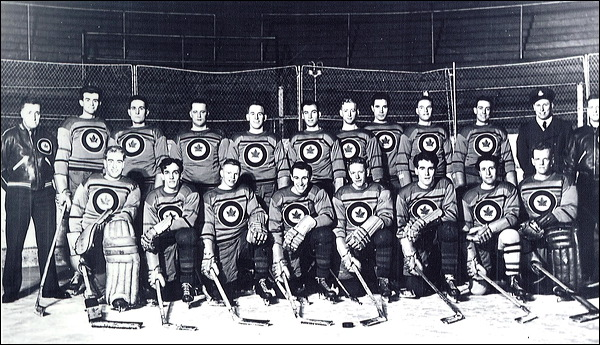
The gold medal-winning men's ice hockey team, the Ottawa RCAF Flyers.

Event	Gold	Silver	Bronze
Men's team	Canada; Andy Gilpin; Albert Renaud; Bernard Dunster; George Mara; Hubert Brooks; Henri-André Laperrière; Irving Taylor; Pete Leichnitz; Jean Gravelle; Louis Lecompte; Murray Dowey; Patrick Guzzo; Roy A. Forbes; Reginald Schroeter; Ross King; Thomas Hibberd; Walter Halder	Czechoslovakia; Bohumil Modrý; Gustav Bubník; Jaroslav Drobný; Josef Trousílek; Karel Stibor; Ladislav Troják; Miloslav Pokorný; Miroslav Sláma; Oldřich Zábrodský; Přemysl Hajný; Stanislav Konopásek; Václav Roziňák; Vilibald Šťovík; Vladimír Bouzek; Vladimír Kobranov; Vladimír Zábrodský; Zdeněk Jarkovský	Switzerland; Alfred Bieler; Beat Rüedi; Emil Handschin; Ferdinand Cattini; Gebhard Poltera; Hans Bänninger; Hans Cattini; Hans Dürst; Hans Trepp; Heini Lohrer; Heinrich Boller; Otto Schubiger; Reto Perl; Bibi Torriani; Ulrich Poltera; Walter Dürst; Werner Lohrer

== Nordic combined ==
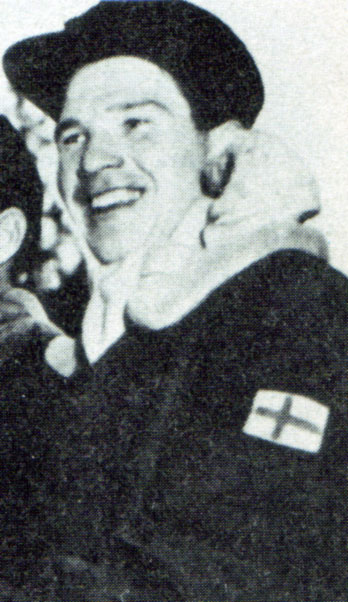
Nordic combined gold medal winner Heikki Hasu, pictured in 1952

Event	Gold	Silver	Bronze
Men's individual	Heikki Hasu; Finland	Martti Huhtala; Finland	Sven Israelsson; Sweden

== Skeleton ==
Event	Gold	Silver	Bronze
Men's individual	Nino Bibbia; Italy	John Heaton; United States	John Crammond; Great Britain

== Ski jumping ==
Event	Gold	Silver	Bronze
Men's individual	Petter Hugsted; Norway	Birger Ruud; Norway	Thorleif Schjelderup; Norway

== Speed skating ==
Event	Gold	Silver	Bronze
500 metres	Finn Helgesen; Norway	Ken Bartholomew; United States	none awarded
500 metres	Finn Helgesen; Norway	Thomas Byberg; Norway	none awarded
500 metres	Finn Helgesen; Norway	Robert Fitzgerald; United States	none awarded
1500 metres	Sverre Farstad; Norway	Åke Seyffarth; Sweden	Odd Lundberg; Norway
5000 metres	Reidar Liaklev; Norway	Odd Lundberg; Norway	Göthe Hedlund; Sweden
10000 metres	Åke Seyffarth; Sweden	Lassi Parkkinen; Finland	Pentti Lammio; Finland

== Multiple medallists ==
Athletes who won more than one medal are listed below.

Athlete	Nation	Sport	Gold	Silver	Bronze	Total
Henri Oreiller	France	Alpine skiing	2	0	1	3
Martin Lundström	Sweden	Cross-country skiing	2	0	0	2
Gretchen Fraser	United States	Alpine skiing	1	1	0	2
Trude Jochum-Beiser	Austria	Alpine skiing	1	1	0	2
Nils Östensson	Sweden	Cross-country skiing	1	1	0	2
Åke Seyffarth	Sweden	Speed skating	1	1	0	2
Gunnar Eriksson	Sweden	Cross-country skiing	1	0	1	2
James Couttet	France	Alpine skiing	0	1	1	2
Odd Lundberg	Norway	Speed skating	0	1	1	2
Karl Molitor	Switzerland	Alpine Skiing	0	1	1	2
Erika Mahringer	Austria	Alpine skiing	0	0	2	2

== See also ==
- 1948 Winter Olympics medal table
