= Nordic skiing at the 1948 Winter Olympics =

At the 1948 Winter Olympics, five Nordic skiing events were contested: three cross-country skiing events, one ski jumping event, and one Nordic combined event, all for men only.

Martin Lundström of Sweden won the 18 km in cross-country skiing. Nils Karlsson of Sweden won the 50 km. The Swedes, consisting of Nils Östensson, Gunnar Eriksson, Martin Lundström, and Nils Täpp, won the 4x10 km relay. Petter Hugsted of Norway won the large hill ski jump. Heikki Hasu of Finland won the Nordic combined.

Nordic skiing discipline	Men's events
Cross-country skiing	• 18 km
Cross-country skiing	• 50 km
Cross-country skiing	• 4 × 10 km relay
Ski jumping	• Large hill (70m)
Nordic combined	• Individual
