= 1948 Winter Olympics medal table =

1948 Winter Olympics medals
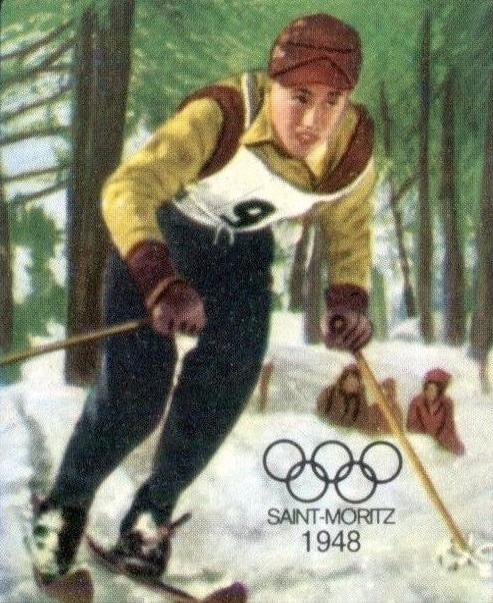
- Henri Oreiller was the most successful athlete at the 1948 Winter Olympics, winning two gold medals and one bronze medal in men's alpine skiing.
- Location: St. Moritz, Switzerland

Highlights
- Most gold medals: Norway (4) and Sweden (4)
- Most total medals: Norway (10), Sweden (10), and Switzerland (10)
- Medalling NOCs: 13

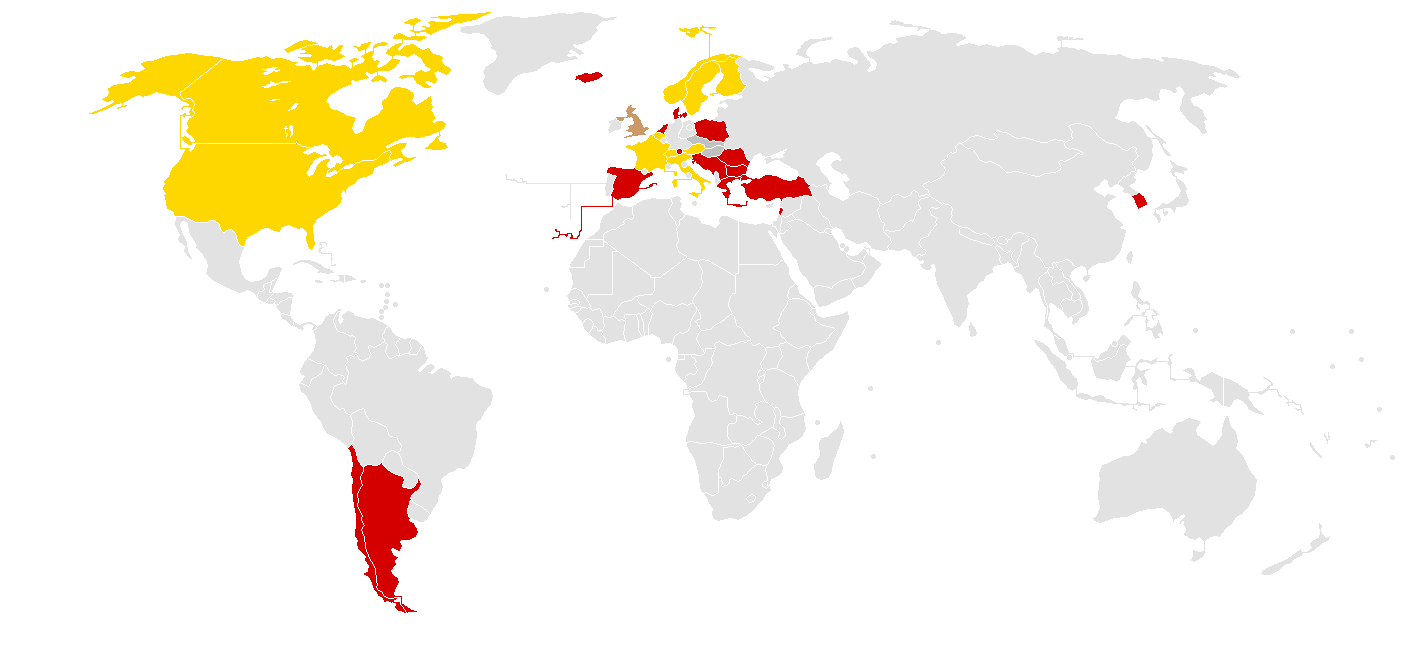
1948 Winter Olympic Games Medals map Legend: Gold represents countries that won at least one gold medal Silver represents countries that won at least one silver medal Bronze represents countries that won at least one bronze medal Red represents countries that did not win any medals Grey represents countries that did not participate

The 1948 Winter Olympics, officially known as the V Olympic Winter Games, were an international multi-sport event held in St. Moritz, Switzerland, from 30 January to 8 February 1948. A total of 669 athletes representing 28 National Olympic Committees (NOCs) participated. NOCs as first-time entrants at the Winter Games included Chile, Denmark, Iceland, Lebanon, and South Korea. The games featured 22 events in 4 sports across 9 disciplines. The games were the first to be celebrated after World War II; it had been twelve years since the last Winter Games in Garmisch-Partenkirchen, Germany, from 6 to 16 February 1936. The games were the second Winter Games held in St. Moritz.

Overall, athletes representing 13 NOCs won at least one medal, and 10 NOCs won at least one gold medal. Norway and Sweden won the most gold medals with 4 and also won the most overall medals with 10, tied with host nation Switzerland. Norway and Sweden also had the same silver and bronze medal totals, meaning that they tied for first place in the medal table. Italy's team won their first Winter Olympic gold medal after Nino Bibbia won the men's skeleton event; the medal was also their first Winter Olympic medal of any color. Additionally, Belgium's team won their first Olympic gold medal, with Micheline Lannoy and Pierre Baugniet winning the pair skating event.

Alpine skiers Henri Oreiller of France and Martin Lundström of Sweden tied for the most gold medals won by an individual at the games, with two each. Oreiller also won the most overall medals, winning an additional bronze medal for a total of three medals. Norway and Sweden both achieved podium sweeps at the games, with the former in the individual ski jumping event with Petter Hugsted winning the gold, Birger Ruud winning the silver, and Thorleif Schjelderup winning the bronze, and the latter in the men's 18 kilometre cross-country skiing event with Lundström winning the gold, Nils Östensson winning the silver, and Gunnar Eriksson winning the bronze.

== Medal table ==
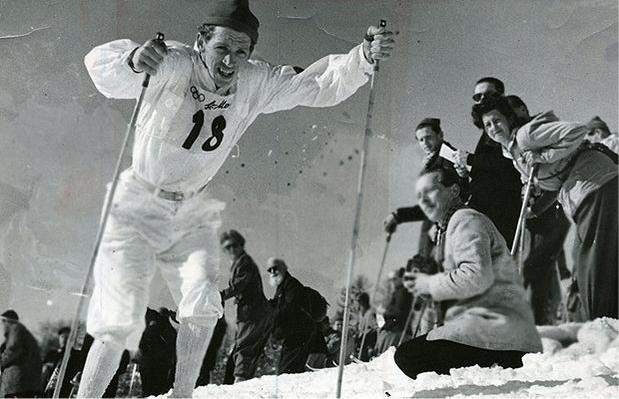
Martin Lundström tied with Oreiller for the most gold medals won at the games, with two.

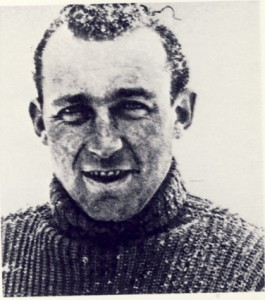
Nino Bibbia, the first Winter Olympic medalist for Italy

The medal table is based on information provided by the International Olympic Committee (IOC) and is consistent with IOC conventional sorting in its published medal tables. The table uses the Olympic medal table sorting method. By default, the table is ordered by the number of gold medals the athletes from a nation have won, where a nation is an entity represented by a NOC. The number of silver medals is taken into consideration next and then the number of bronze medals. If teams are still tied, equal ranking is given and they are listed alphabetically by their IOC country code.

In alpine skiing, two bronze medals were awarded in the men's downhill event after a third-place tie. In speed skating, a three-way tie for second place resulted in three silver medals and no bronze medal being awarded in the men's 500 metres event.

* Host nation (Switzerland)

1948 Winter Olympics medal table
Rank	Nation	Gold	Silver	Bronze	Total
1	Norway	4	3	3	10
1	Sweden	4	3	3	10
3	Switzerland*	3	4	3	10
4	United States	3	4	2	9
5	France	2	1	2	5
6	Canada	2	0	1	3
7	Austria	1	3	4	8
8	Finland	1	3	2	6
9	Belgium	1	1	0	2
10	Italy	1	0	0	1
11	Czechoslovakia	0	1	0	1
11	Hungary	0	1	0	1
13	Great Britain	0	0	2	2
Totals (13 entries)		22	24	22	68

== See also ==
- List of 1948 Winter Olympics medal winners
- 1948 Summer Olympics medal table
