= Martti Sipilä =

Finnish cross-country skier

Personal information
- Nationality: Finnish
- Born: 11 July 1915 Vehkalahti, Finland
- Died: 10 April 2003 (aged 87) Lahti, Finland

Sport
- Sport: Cross-country skiing

Martti Sipilä (11 July 1915 – 10 April 2003) was a Finnish cross-country skier. He competed in the men's 50 km event at the 1948 Winter Olympics.

== Cross-country skiing results ==
=== Olympic Games ===
Year	Age	18 km	50 km	4 × 10 km relay
1948	32	—	DNF	—

=== World Championships ===
Year	Age	18 km	50 km	4 × 10 km relay
1938	22	29	—	—
