= Martin Jære =

Norwegian skier

Personal information
- Born: 9 January 1920 Oppdal Municipality, Norway
- Died: 18 December 2015 (aged 95)

Sport
- Country: Norway
- Sport: Skiing

Martin Jære (9 January 1920 – 18 December 2015) was a Norwegian skier from Oppdal Municipality. He competed in cross-country skiing at the 1948 Winter Olympics, where he placed 10th in 50 km.

== Cross-country skiing results ==
=== Olympic Games ===
Year	Age	18 km	50 km	4 × 10 km relay
1948	28	—	10	—
