= Vanninen =

Vanninen or Vänninen is a Finnish surname. Notable people with the surname include:

- Benjamin Vanninen (1921–1975), Finnish cross-country skier
- Henna Vänninen (born 1983), Finnish actress
- Jukka Vanninen (born 1977), Finnish footballer
- Pekka Vanninen (1911–1970), Finnish cross-country skier
- Saga Vanninen (born 2003), Finnish athlete
