= Bærums SK =

Norwegian sports club

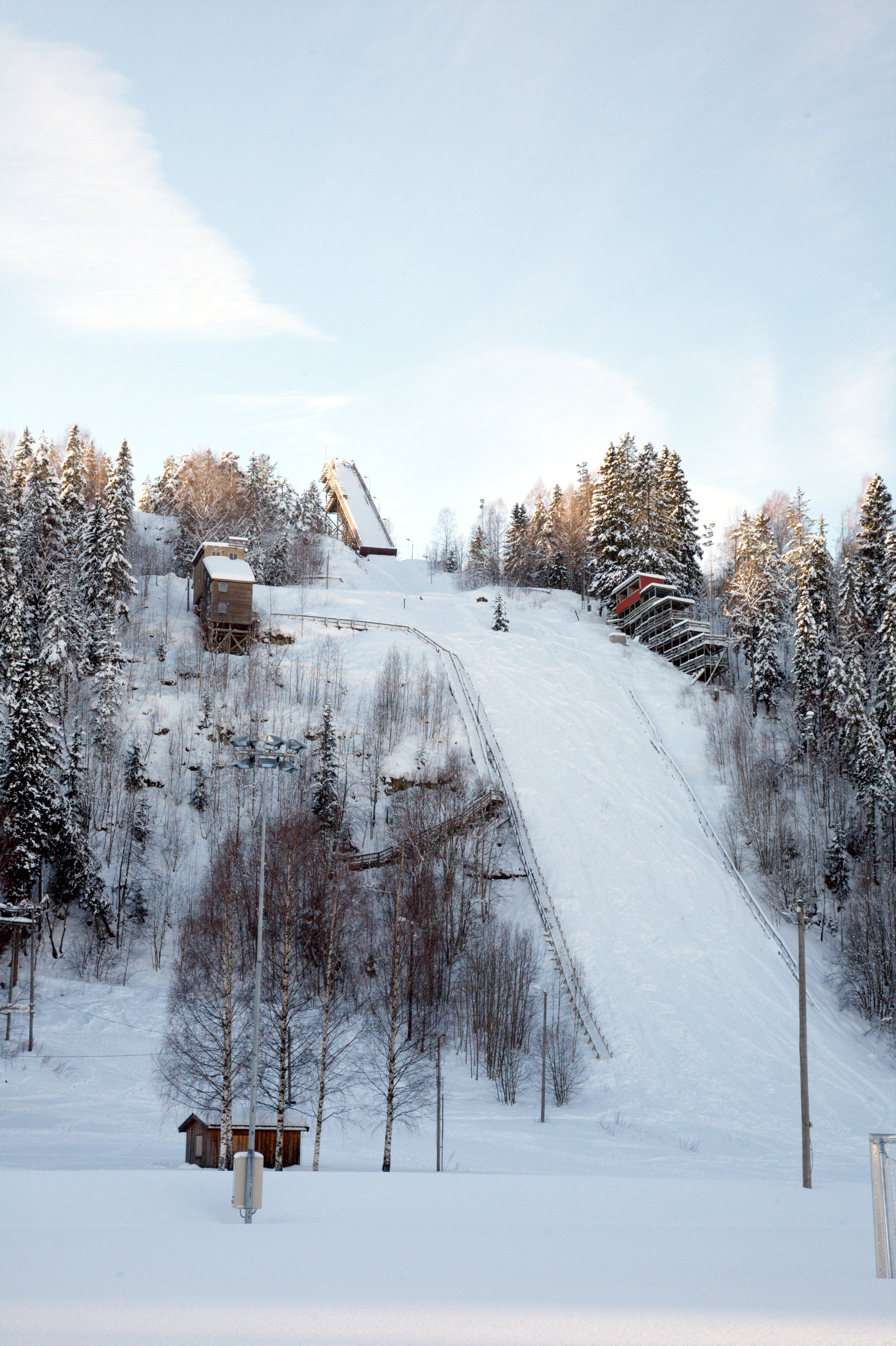
- Skuibakken is owned by Bærums Skiklub
- Full name: Bærums Skiklub
- Founded: 1885

Bærums Skiklub is a Norwegian multi sports club founded in 1885. It has sections for cross-country skiing, alpine skiing, freestyle skiing, snowboarding, biathlon and orienteering.

Venues include Solbergbakken, Skuibakken and Kirkerudbakken.

== Notable club members ==
Notable club members include Nordic skiers Karl Hovelsen, Harald Økern, Olav Økern and Anne Jahren, alpine skiers Borghild Niskin, Inger Bjørnbakken, Toril Førland, Arild Holm, Finn Christian Jagge, Lasse Kjus and Hans Petter Buraas, Aleksander Aamodt Kilde, Lucas Braathen, Atle Lie McGrath and orienteering competitor Marit Økern Jensen.

Snowboarders and freestyle skiers include Tormod Frostad, Christel Thoresen, Ståle Sandbech, Mons Røisland, Birk Ruud, Felix Stridsberg-Usterud, and Aleksander Østreng.

Biathletes such as Sturla Holm Lægreid, also originate from BSK.
