= Thorleif Vangen =

Thorleif Birger Vangen (11 September 1920 – 1 March 1996) was a Norwegian skier from Kongsvinger. He competed in cross-country skiing at the 1948 Winter Olympics. He was Norwegian champion in 18 km in 1948, in 30 km in 1946 and 1947, and in 50 km in 1946.

== Cross-country skiing results ==
=== Olympic Games ===
Year	Age	18 km	50 km	4 × 10 km relay
1948	27	—	DNF	—
