= Sweden at the 1948 Winter Olympics =

- IOC code: SWE
- NOC: Swedish Olympic Committee
- Website: www.sok.se (in Swedish and English)

in St. Moritz
- Competitors: 43 (42 men, 1 woman) in 6 sports
- Flag bearer: Erik Lindström (ski jumping)
- Medals Ranked 1st: Gold 4 Silver 3 Bronze 3 Total 10

Winter Olympics appearances (overview)
- 1924; 1928; 1932; 1936; 1948; 1952; 1956; 1960; 1964; 1968; 1972; 1976; 1980; 1984; 1988; 1992; 1994; 1998; 2002; 2006; 2010; 2014; 2018; 2022; 2026

Sweden competed at the 1948 Winter Olympics in St. Moritz, Switzerland.

== Medalists ==
Medal	Name	Sport	Event
Gold	Martin Lundström	Cross-country skiing	Men's 18 km
Gold	Nils Karlsson	Cross-country skiing	Men's 50 km
Gold	Nils Östensson; Nils Täpp; Gunnar Eriksson; Martin Lundström	Cross-country skiing	Men's 4 x 10 km relay
Gold	Åke Seyffarth	Speed skating	Men's 10 000 m
Silver	Nils Östensson	Cross-country skiing	Men's 18 km
Silver	Harald Eriksson	Cross-country skiing	Men's 50 km
Silver	Åke Seyffarth	Speed skating	Men's 1500 m
Bronze	Gunnar Eriksson	Cross-country skiing	Men's 18 km
Bronze	Sven Israelsson	Nordic combined	Men's individual
Bronze	Göthe Hedlund	Speed skating	Men's 5000 m

== Alpine skiing ==
Men

Athlete	Event	Race 1		Race 2		Total	
Athlete	Event	Time	Rank	Time	Rank	Time	Rank
Olle Dalman	Downhill					3:23.2	41
Stig Sollander	Downhill					3:23.1	40
Åke Nilsson	Downhill					3:22.2	38
Sixten Isberg	Downhill					3:15.0	30
Hans Hansson	Downhill					3:05.0	10
Åke Nilsson	Slalom	DNF	–	–	–	DNF	–
Hans Hansson	Slalom	1:11.1	11	1:07.2	16	2:18.3	11
Sixten Isberg	Slalom	1:10.7	8	1:06.5	13	2:17.2	10
Olle Dalman	Slalom	1:10.4	7	1:03.2	3	2:13.6	5

Men's combined

The downhill part of this event was held along with the main medal event of downhill skiing. For athletes competing in both events, the same time was used (see table above for the results). The slalom part of the event was held separate from the main medal event of slalom skiing (included in table below).

Athlete	Slalom			Total (downhill + slalom)	
Athlete	Time 1	Time 2	Rank	Points	Rank
Stig Sollander	–	–	–	DNF	–
Olle Dalman	–	–	–	DNF	–
Åke Nilsson	1:15.3	1:09.4	10	19.43	19
Hans Hansson	1:13.5	1:10.0	9	9.31	6

Women

Athlete	Event	Race 1		Race 2		Total	
Athlete	Event	Time	Rank	Time	Rank	Time	Rank
May Nilsson	Downhill					2:39.1	18
May Nilsson	Slalom	1:12.2	19	57.5	2	2:09.7	10

Women's combined

The downhill part of this event was held along with the main medal event of downhill skiing. For athletes competing in both events, the same time was used (see table above for the results). The slalom part of the event was held separate from the main medal event of slalom skiing (included in table below).

Athlete	Slalom			Total (downhill + slalom)	
Athlete	Time 1	Time 2	Rank	Points	Rank
May Nilsson	1:05.3	1:05.3	9	13.03	15

== Cross-country skiing ==
Men

Event	Athlete	Race	
Event	Athlete	Time	Rank
18 km	Clas Haraldsson	1'24:21	33
18 km	Erik Elmsäter	1'22:12	19
18 km	Sven Israelsson	1'21:44	16
18 km	Nils Karlsson	1'16:54	5
18 km	Gunnar Eriksson	1'16:06	3rd place, bronze medalist(s)
18 km	Nils Östensson	1'14:22	2nd place, silver medalist(s)
18 km	Martin Lundström	1'13:50	1st place, gold medalist(s)
50 km	Arthur Herrdin	DNF	–
50 km	Anders Törnqvist	3'58:20	5
50 km	Harald Eriksson	3'52:20	2nd place, silver medalist(s)
50 km	Nils Karlsson	3'47:48	1st place, gold medalist(s)

Men's 4 x 10 km relay

Athletes	Race	
Athletes	Time	Rank
Nils Östensson; Nils Täpp; Gunnar Eriksson; Martin Lundström	2'32:08	1st place, gold medalist(s)

== Ice hockey ==
Summary

Team	Event	Round robin								
Team	Event	Opposition Score	Opposition Score	Opposition Score	Opposition Score	Opposition Score	Opposition Score	Opposition Score	Opposition Score	Rank
Sweden men's	Men's tournament	Canada; L 1–3	Czechoslovakia; L 3–6	Austria; W 7–1	United States; L 2–5	Switzerland; L 2–8	Great Britain; W 4–3	Italy; W 23–0	Poland; W 13–2	4

The tournament was run in a round-robin format with nine teams participating.

	Pld	W	L	T	GF	GA	Pts
Canada	8	7	0	1	69	5	15
Czechoslovakia	8	7	0	1	80	18	15
Switzerland	8	6	2	0	67	21	12
Sweden 4th	8	4	4	0	55	28	8
Great Britain	8	3	5	0	39	47	6
Poland	8	2	6	0	29	97	4
Austria	8	1	7	0	33	77	2
Italy	8	0	8	0	24	156	0
United States *	8	5	3	0	86	33	10

* United States team was disqualified. Only eight teams are officially ranked.

- Canada 3-1 Sweden
- Czechoslovakia 6-3 Sweden
- Sweden 7-1 Austria
- USA 5-2 Sweden
- Switzerland 8-2 Sweden
- Sweden 4-3 United Kingdom
- Sweden 23-0 Italy
- Sweden 13-2 Poland

Contestants; Stig Andersson; Åke Andersson; Stig Carlsson; Åke Ericson; Rolf Ericsson; Svante Granlund; Arne Johansson; Rune Johansson; Gunnar Landelius; Klas Lindström; Lars Ljungman; Holger Nurmela; Bror Pettersson; Rolf Pettersson; Kurt Svanberg; Sven Thunman

== Nordic combined ==
Events:

- 18 km cross-country skiing
- normal hill ski jumping

The cross-country skiing part of this event was combined with the main medal event, meaning that athletes competing here were skiing for two disciplines at the same time. Details can be found above in this article, in the cross-country skiing section.

The ski jumping (normal hill) event was held separate from the main medal event of ski jumping, results can be found in the table below. Athletes would perform three jumps, of which the two best jumps (distance and form) were counted.

Athlete	Event	Cross-country		Ski Jumping					Total	
Athlete	Event	Points	Rank	Distance 1	Distance 2	Distance 3	Points	Rank	Points	Rank
Clas Haraldsson	Individual	197.35	15	63.5	66.0	66.0	213.4	4	410.75	10
Erik Elmsäter	Individual	208.95	6	56.0	61.5	58.0	202.0	15	410.95	9
Sven Israelsson	Individual	211.50	4	67.5	66.0	67.0	221.9	1	433.40	3rd place, bronze medalist(s)

== Ski jumping ==
Athlete	Event	Distance 1	Distance 2	Total points	Rank
Erik Lindström	Normal hill	DNF	–	DNF	–
Vilhelm Hellman	Normal hill	57.5	65.0	208.1	14
Nils Lundh	Normal hill	61.5 (fall)	66.0	152.7	40
Evert Karlsson	Normal hill	65.5	68.0	212.2	11

== Speed skating ==
Men

Event	Athlete	Race	
Event	Athlete	Time	Rank
500 m	Göthe Hedlund	45.6	20
500 m	Åke Seyffarth	44.0	11
500 m	Halle Janemar	44.0	11
500 m	Mats Bolmstedt	43.7	10
1500 m	Mats Bolmstedt	2:22.8	17
1500 m	Göthe Hedlund	2:20.7	8
1500 m	Harry Jansson	2:20.0	5
1500 m	Åke Seyffarth	2:18.1	2nd place, silver medalist(s)
5000 m	Rune Hammarström	8:53.8	16
5000 m	Åke Seyffarth	8:37.9	7
5000 m	Harry Jansson	8:34.9	4
5000 m	Göthe Hedlund	8:34.8	3rd place, bronze medalist(s)
10,000 m	Göthe Hedlund	DNF	–
10,000 m	Rune Hammarström	18:39.6	9
10,000 m	Harry Jansson	18:08.0	8
10,000 m	Åke Seyffarth	17:26.3	1st place, gold medalist(s)
