= Pekka Vanninen =

Finnish cross-country skier

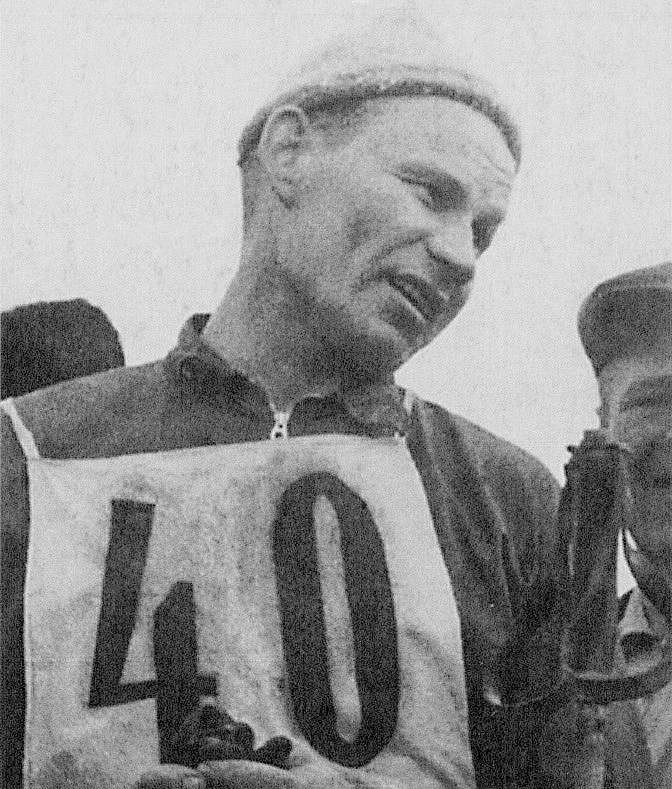

Personal information
- Born: 29 January 1911 Rautalakhti, Kareliya, Russia
- Died: 13 February 1970 (aged 59) Jämsä, Finland
- Height: 174 cm (5 ft 9 in)
- Weight: 75 kg (165 lb)

Sport
- Sport: Cross-country skiing
- Event: 50 km

Pekka Vanninen (29 January 1911 – 13 February 1970) was a Finnish cross-country skier who won six national titles over 50 km, in 1937–38, 1946 and 1948–50. He competed in this event at the 1948 Winter Olympics and finished fourth, 20 seconds behind his younger brother Benjamin. Pekka served as the Finnish flag bearer at those Olympics.

== Cross-country skiing results ==
All results are sourced from the International Ski Federation (FIS).

=== Olympic Games ===
Year	Age	18 km	50 km	4 × 10 km relay
1948	37	—	4	—

=== World Championships ===
Year	Age	18 km	50 km	4 × 10 km relay
1939	28	—	4	—
1950	39	—	6	—
