= Rytky (surname) =

Rytky is a Finnish surname.

== Geographical distribution ==
As of 2014, 82.2% of all known bearers of the surname Rytky were residents of Finland (frequency 1:24,215), 9.8% of the United States (1:13,379,677) and 7.6% of Sweden (1:468,893).

In Finland, the frequency of the surname was higher than national average (1:24,215) in the following regions:

1. North Ostrobothnia (1:2,572)
2. Lapland (1:8,251)

== People ==
- Sauli Rytky (1918–2006), Finnish cross-country skier
