= Sommariva (surname) =

Sommariva is an Italian surname. Notable people with the surname include:

- Daniele Sommariva (born 1997), Italian association football player
- Emilio Sommariva (1883–1956), Italian painter and photographer
- Giovanni Battista Sommariva (died 1826), Italian politician of the Cisalpine Republic and a arts patron
- Lorenzo Sommariva (born 1993), Italian snowboarder
- Stefano Sommariva (1918–2007), Italian cross-country skier

== See also ==
- Riva (surname)
- Sommariva (disambiguation)
