= Edi Schild =

Swiss cross-country skier

Edi Schild (also Edy; 21 February 1919 – 22 June 2008) was a Swiss cross-country skier who competed in the 1948 Winter Olympics. In 1948 he was a member of the Swiss relay team which finished fifth in the 4x10 km relay competition. In the 50 km event he finished sixth and in the 18 km competition he finished 20th.
