= Sommariva =

Sommariva may refer to:

- Sommariva (surname)
- Sommariva Perno, a commune in Italy
- Sommariva del Bosco, a commune in Italy
- Sommariva, Queensland, a locality in Murweh Shire, Australia
