= Marit Økern =

Norwegian orienteer (born 1938)

Marit Økern Jensen
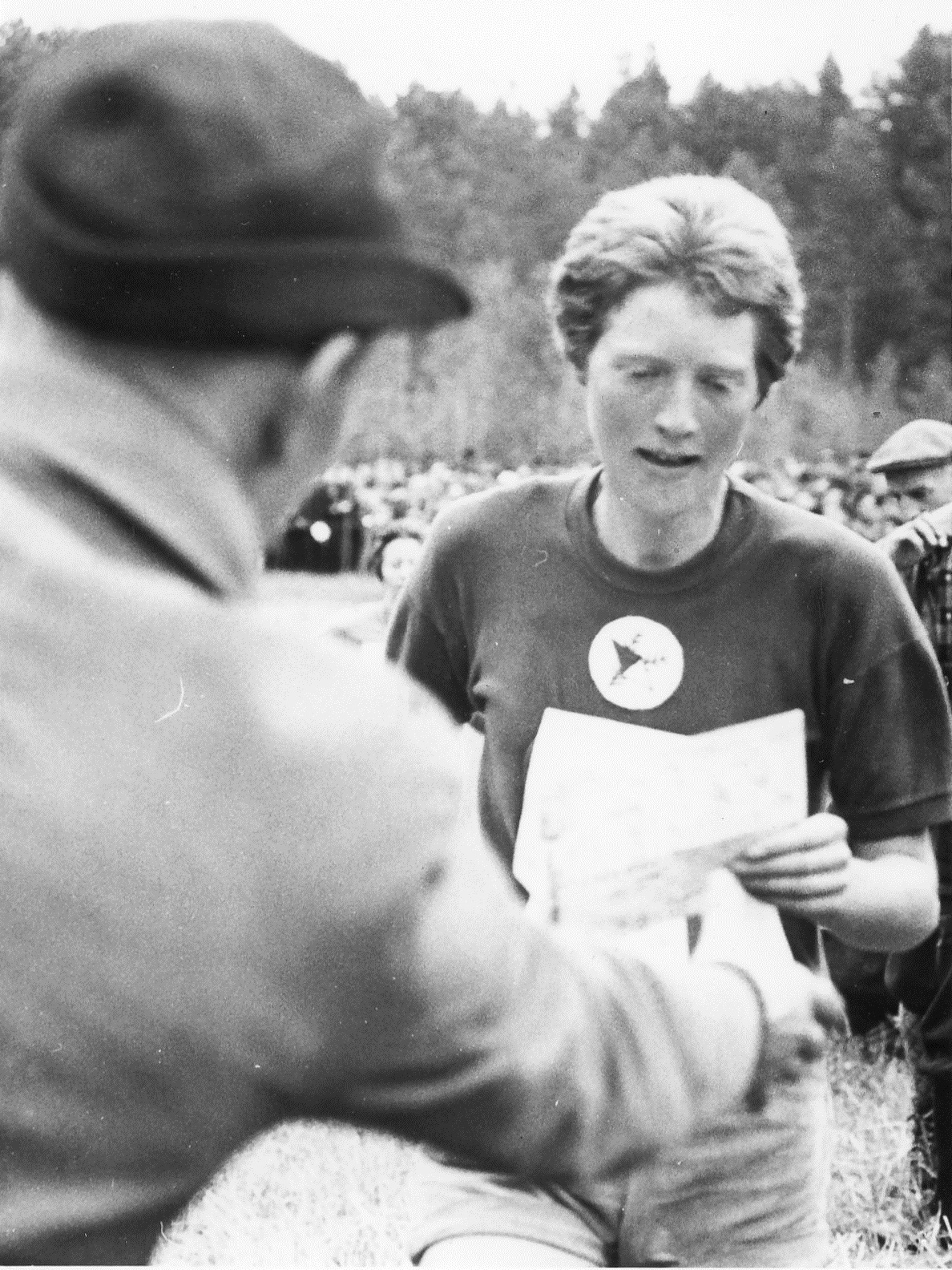

Personal information
- Born: 4 April 1938 (age 88) Norway
- Father: Harald Økern

Sport
- Club: Bærums Skiklub
Medal record
Women's orienteering
Representing Norway
European Championships
Silver medal – second place	1962 Løten	Individual
Silver medal – second place	1962 Løten	Relay (unofficial)

Marit Økern Jensen (born 4 April 1938) is a Norwegian orienteering competitor. She won six national titles in orienteering, and won a silver medal in the first European championships.

== Biography ==
Born on 4 April 1938, Marit Økern is a daughter of Harald Økern, a Nordic combined skier.

She competed in the first European Orienteering Championships in 1962, where she won a silver medal in the individual event, and also a silver medal in the unofficial relay event.

== National championships ==
Marit Økern won a total of six gold medals in the Norwegian championships. She received the King's Cup trophy in 1962, 1963 and 1965.
