= Cristiano Rodeghiero =

Italian cross-country skier

Cristiano Rodeghiero (22 April 1915 – 23 September 1999) was an Italian cross-country skier who competed in the 1948 Winter Olympics.

== Personal life ==
He was the older brother of Rizzieri Rodeghiero.

== Sports career ==
In 1948 he finished 13th in the 50 km competition and 35th in the 18 km event.
