= Louis Bourban =

Swiss cross-country skier (1917–1999)

Personal information
- Nationality: Swiss
- Born: 15 August 1917; Nendaz, Switzerland
- Died: 25 February 1999 (aged 81)

Sport
- Sport: Cross-country skiing

Louis Bourban (15 August 1917 – 25 February 1999) was a Swiss cross-country skier. He competed in the men's 50 kilometre event at the 1948 Winter Olympics.
