= Tone Pogačnik =

Anton "Tone" Pogačnik (4 January 1919 – June 2013) was a Slovenian cross-country skier who participated in the 1948 Winter Olympics in St. Moritz, Switzerland. He was born in Jesenice. In the Men's 18 km competition, he placed 56th with a time of 1'29:08. He also placed 9th with the Yugoslavian team in the Men's 4 × 10 km relay.

On 26 April 1946 Pogačnik fell nearly to his death on Triglav, the highest mountain in Slovenia, after falling down a gap of 96 meters. He survived with no serious internal injuries. After becoming confused and lost in the fog, he had approached a dark section that he believed to be a rock structure, but was actually a drop. He landed on a snowy field between two rocky pillars and became stuck, having to wait several hours before being rescued. The next day, he descended the same route alone. Pogačnik celebrated his 90th birthday in 2009. His wife died in 1999. From the death of Karlo Umek on 25 September 2010, until his own, he was the oldest living Slovenian Olympic athlete.
