= Victor Borghi =

Italian cross-country skier (1912–1986)

Personal information
- Nationality: Italian
- Born: 3 November 1912
- Died: 8 March 1986 (aged 73)

Sport
- Sport: Cross-country skiing

Victor Borghi (3 November 1912 – 8 March 1986) was a Swiss cross-country skier. He competed in the men's 50 kilometre event at the 1948 Winter Olympics.
