= Reidar Nyborg =

Norwegian cross-country skier (1923–1990)

Medal record

Men's cross-country skiing

Representing Norway

Olympic Games
| Bronze medal – third place | 1948 St. Moritz | 4 × 10 km relay |

Reidar Nyborg (April 4, 1923 – April 30, 1990) was a Norwegian cross-country skier who competed during the 1940s. He won a bronze in the 4 × 10 km relay at the 1948 Winter Olympics in St. Moritz.

== Cross-country skiing results ==
=== Olympic Games ===
| Year | Age | 18 km | 50 km | 4 × 10 km relay |
|---|---|---|---|---|
| 1948 | 24 | 17 | — | Bronze |
