= Józef Daniel Krzeptowski =

Polish skier (1921–2002)

Personal information
- Nationality: Polish
- Born: 29 July 1921; Inowrocław, Poland
- Died: 13 August 2002 (aged 81); Zakopane, Poland

Sport
- Sport: Skiing

Józef Daniel Krzeptowski (29 July 1921 – 13 August 2002) was a Polish skier. He competed at the 1948 Winter Olympics and the 1956 Winter Olympics.
