= Harald Eriksson =

Swedish cross-country skier

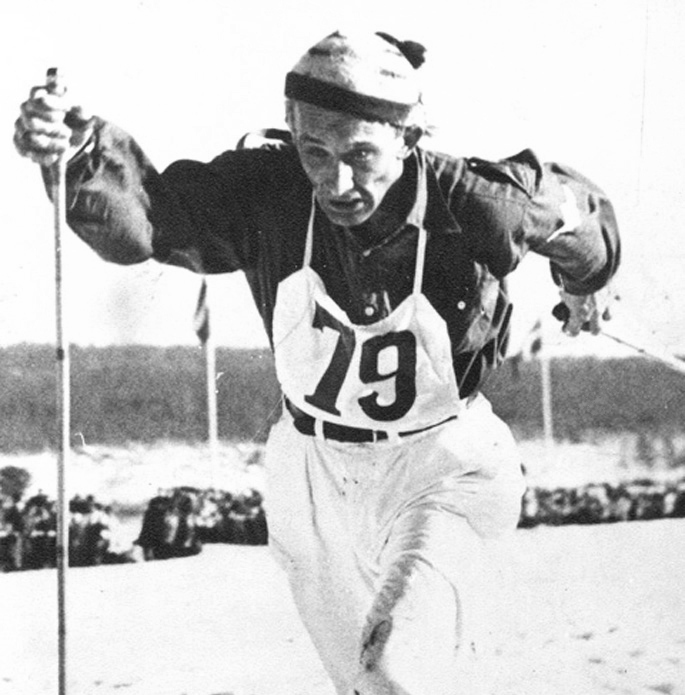

Personal information
- Born: 22 September 1921 Örträsk, Sweden
- Died: 20 May 2015 (aged 83) Umeå, Sweden

Sport
- Sport: Cross-country skiing
- Club: IFK Umeå
Medal record
Men's cross-country skiing
Representing Sweden
Olympic Games
| Silver medal – second place | 1948 St. Moritz | 50 km |

Harald Eriksson (or Ericsson, 22 September 1921 – 20 May 2015) was a Swedish cross-country skier who won the silver medal in the 50 km event at the 1948 Winter Olympics in St. Moritz. The same year he won the 50 km at the Holmenkollen ski festival. He had to withdraw from the 50 km race at the 1952 Games due to a high fever.

Eriksson served in the Swedish Army in Umeå, but had good opportunities to train because his commander was also chairman of his skiing club. He later worked at a sports shop in Umeå, together with his friends and rivals Gunnar Karlsson and Martin Lundström; the trio formed a successful relay team.

== Cross-country skiing results ==
All results are sourced from the International Ski Federation (FIS).

=== Olympic Games ===
- 1 medal – (1 silver)

| Year | Age | 18 km | 50 km | 4 × 10 km relay |
|---|---|---|---|---|
| 1948 | 26 | — | Silver | — |
