= Erling Evensen =

Norwegian cross-country skier (1914–1998)

Olympic medal record

Men's cross-country skiing

Representing Norway
Bronze medal – third place	1948 St. Moritz	4 × 10 km relay

Erling Evensen (April 29, 1914 – July 31, 1998) was a Norwegian cross-country skier who competed during the 1940s. He won a bronze medal in the 4 × 10 km relay at the 1948 Winter Olympics in St. Moritz. Evensen also finished 15th in the 18 km event at those same games.

== Cross-country skiing results ==
=== Olympic Games ===
Year	Age	18 km	50 km	4 × 10 km relay
1948	33	15	—	Bronze

=== World Championships ===
Year	Age	18 km	50 km	4 × 10 km relay
1939	24	26	—	4
