= Teuvo Laukkanen =

Finnish cross-country skier

Medal record

Men's cross-country skiing

Representing Finland

Olympic Games
Silver medal – second place	1948 St. Moritz	4 × 10 km relay

Teuvo Johannes Laukkanen (16 July 1919 – 14 May 2011) was a Finnish cross-country skier who competed in the 1940s.

He was born and died in Pielavesi.

He won a silver medal at the 1948 Winter Olympics in St. Moritz in the 4 × 10 km relay.

== Cross-country skiing results ==
=== Olympic Games ===
- 1 medal – (1 bronze)

Year	Age	18 km	50 km	4 × 10 km relay
1948	28	8	—	Bronze
