= Harald Økern =

Norwegian Nordic combined skier

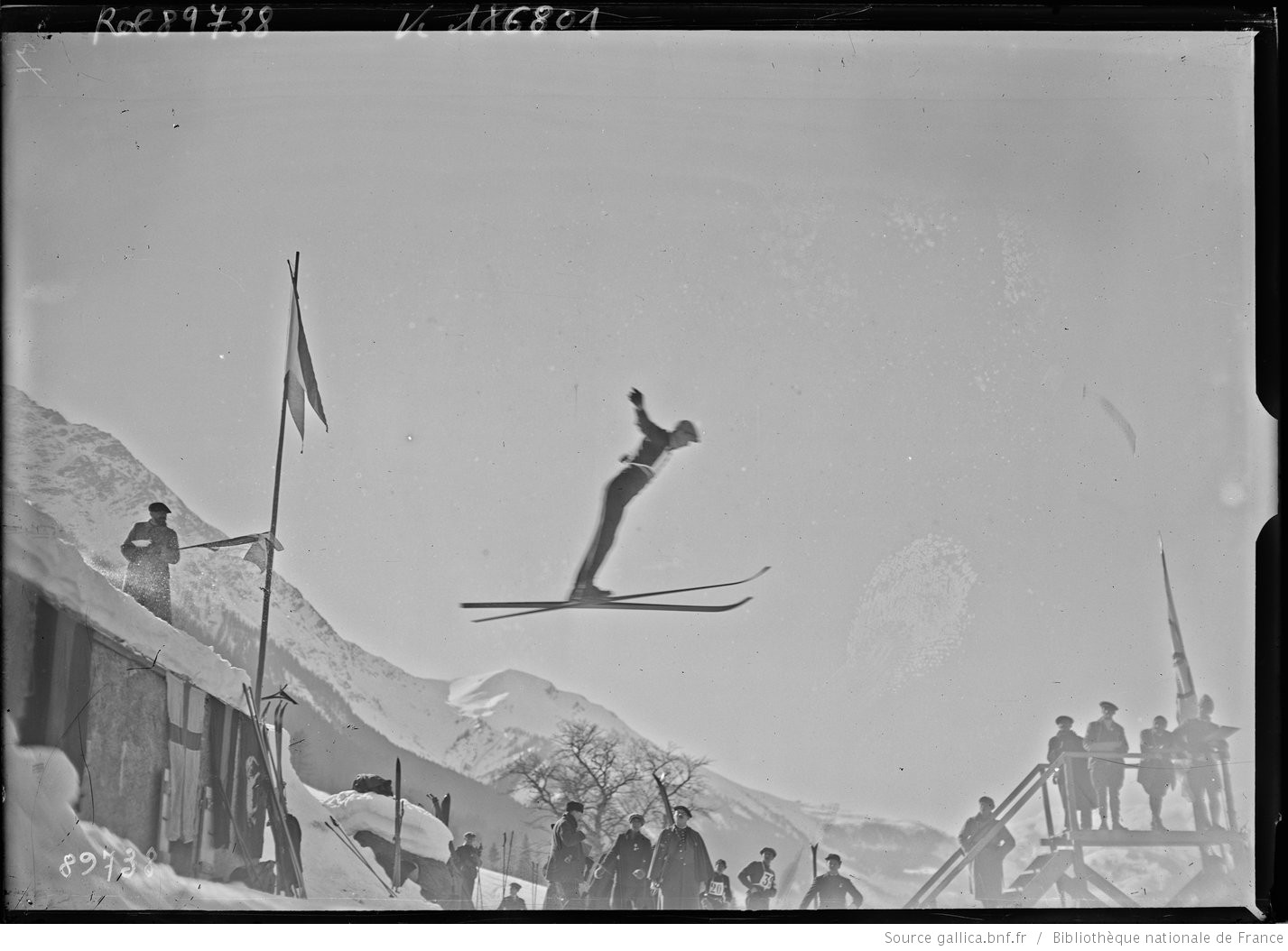
Økern at the 1924 Winter Olympics.

Harald Johannes Økern (19 January 1898 – 17 August 1977) was a Norwegian Nordic combined skier who won the event at the Holmenkollen ski festival in 1922 and 1924. For his Nordic combined victories, Økern shared the Holmenkollen medal in 1924 with Johan Grøttumsbråten.

He was born and died in Bærum.

At the 1924 Winter Olympics he finished fourth in the Nordic combined event.

Harald Økern was the uncle of Olav Økern, who later earned the Holmenkollen medal in 1950.

He was the father of Marit Økern Jensen.
