= Stefano Sommariva =

Italian cross-country skier

Personal information
- Nationality: Italian
- Born: 27 April 1918
- Died: 7 July 2007 (aged 89)

Sport
- Sport: Cross-country skiing

Stefano Sommariva (27 April 1918 – 7 July 2007) was an Italian cross-country skier. He competed in the men's 50 kilometre event at the 1948 Winter Olympics.
