= Olav Hagen =

Norwegian cross-country skier

Medal record

Men's cross-country skiing

Representing Norway

Olympic Games
Bronze medal – third place	1948 St. Moritz	4 × 10 km relay

Olav Hagen (November 28, 1921 – August 21, 2013) was a Norwegian cross country skier who competed during the 1940s. He won a bronze in the 4 × 10 km relay at the 1948 Winter Olympics in St. Moritz.

== Cross-country skiing results ==
=== Olympic Games ===
Year	Age	18 km	50 km	4 × 10 km relay
1948	26	9	—	Bronze
