= Lauri Silvennoinen =

Finnish cross-country skier

Olympic medal record

Men's cross-country skiing

Representing Finland

Olympic Games
Silver medal – second place	1948 St. Moritz	4 × 10 km relay

Lauri Silvennoinen (November 7, 1916 – December 24, 2004) was a Finnish cross-country skier who competed in the 1940s. He was born in Kesälahti, North Karelia.

Silvennoinen won a silver medal at the 1948 Winter Olympics in St. Moritz in the 4 × 10 km relay.

== Cross-country skiing results ==
=== Olympic Games ===
- 1 medal – (1 silver)

Year	Age	18 km	50 km	4 × 10 km relay
1948	31	—	—	Silver

=== World Championships ===
Year	Age	18 km	50 km	4 × 10 km relay
1938	21	32	—	—
