= Sauli Rytky =

Finnish cross-country skier

Olympic medal record

Men's cross-country skiing

Representing Finland

Olympic Games
Silver medal – second place	1948 St. Moritz	4 × 10 km relay

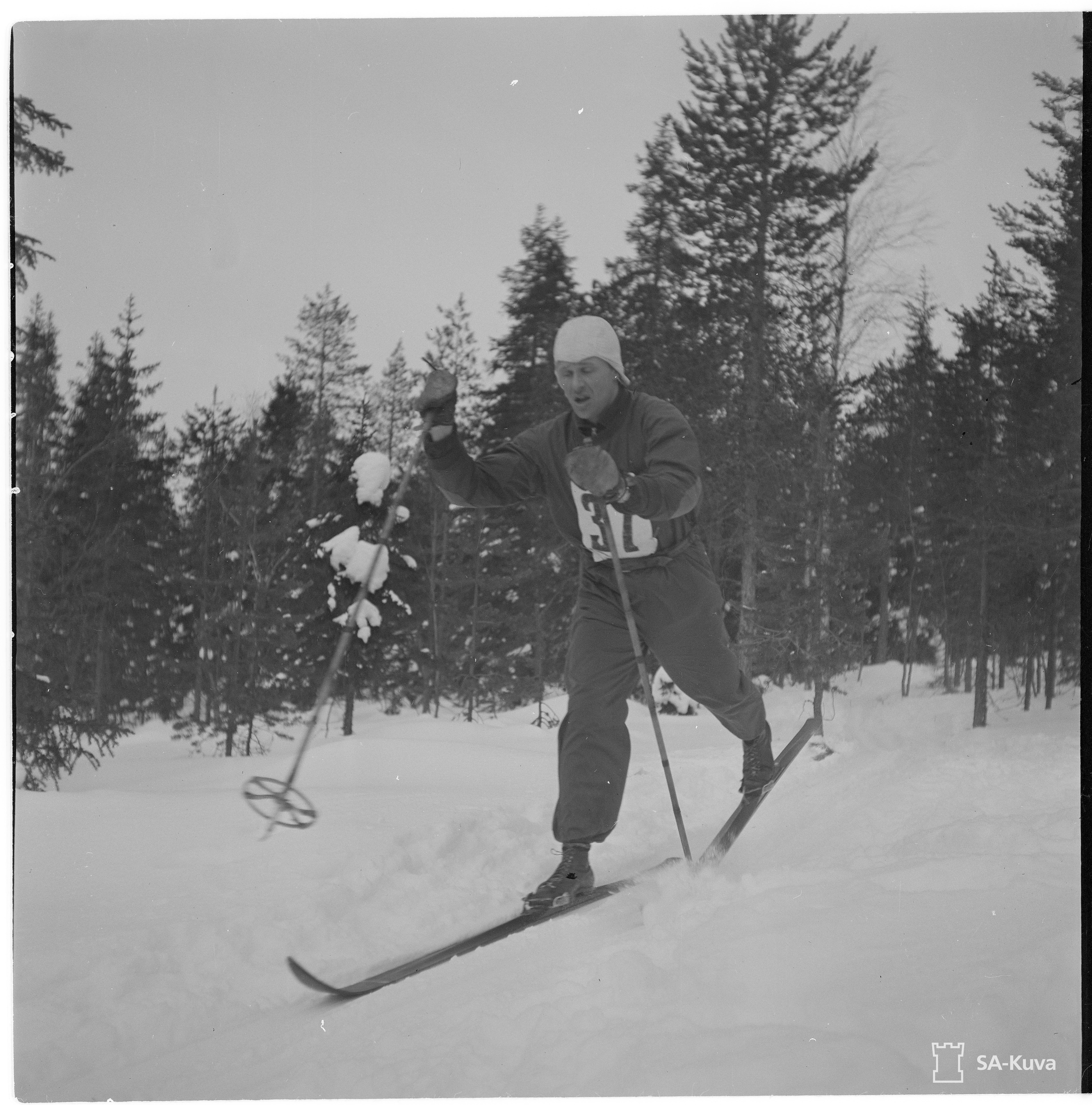
Finnish cross country skier Sauli Rytky, Finnish 18 km cross country winner in 1944

Sauli Rytky (June 6, 1918 in Haapavesi, Northern Ostrobothnia – January 28, 2006) was a Finnish cross-country skier who competed in the 1940s.

He was born in Haapavesi.

He won a silver medal at the 1948 Winter Olympics in St. Moritz in the 4 × 10 km relay.

Rytky also finished sixth in the 18 km event at the 1948 Winter Olympics.

== Cross-country skiing results ==
All results are sourced from the International Ski Federation (FIS).

=== Olympic Games ===
- 1 medal – (1 silver)

Year	Age	18 km	50 km	4 × 10 km relay
1948	29	6	—	Silver

=== World Championships ===
Year	Age	18 km	50 km	4 × 10 km relay
1938	19	—	—	—
