= Jože Knific =

Slovenian cross-country skier

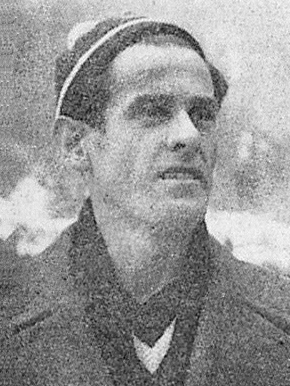

Personal information
- Nationality: Slovenian
- Born: 17 April 1915; Jesenice, Austria-Hungary
- Died: 2001 (aged 85–86)

Sport
- Sport: Cross-country skiing

Jože Knific (17 April 1915 – 2001) was a Slovenian cross-country skier. He competed in the men's 18 kilometre event at the 1948 Winter Olympics.
