= Olav Økern =

Norwegian cross-country skier (1911–2000)

Medal record

Men's cross-country skiing

Representing Norway

Olympic Games
Bronze medal – third place	1948 St. Moritz	4 × 10 km relay

World Championships
Silver medal – second place	1938 Lahti	4 × 10 km relay

Olav Økern (3 June 1911 – 11 April 2000) was a Norwegian cross-country skier who competed in the 1930s and 1940s. He won a bronze in the 4 × 10 km relay at the 1948 Winter Olympics in St. Moritz.

In addition, he won a silver in the 4 × 10 km relay at the 1938 FIS Nordic World Ski Championships and the 18 km event at the 1940 Holmenkollen ski festival. Because of those wins, Økern earned the Holmenkollen medal in 1950. His uncle, Harald Økern, had earned the same medal in 1924.

== Cross-country skiing results ==
All results are sourced from the International Ski Federation (FIS).

=== Olympic Games ===
- 1 medal – (1 bronze)

Year	Age	18 km	50 km	4 × 10 km relay
1948	36	13	—	Bronze
1952	40	—	4	—

=== World Championships ===
- 1 medal – (1 silver)

Year	Age	18 km	50 km	4 × 10 km relay
1938	26	61	—	Silver
