= Benjamin Vanninen =

Finnish cross-country skier (1921–1975)

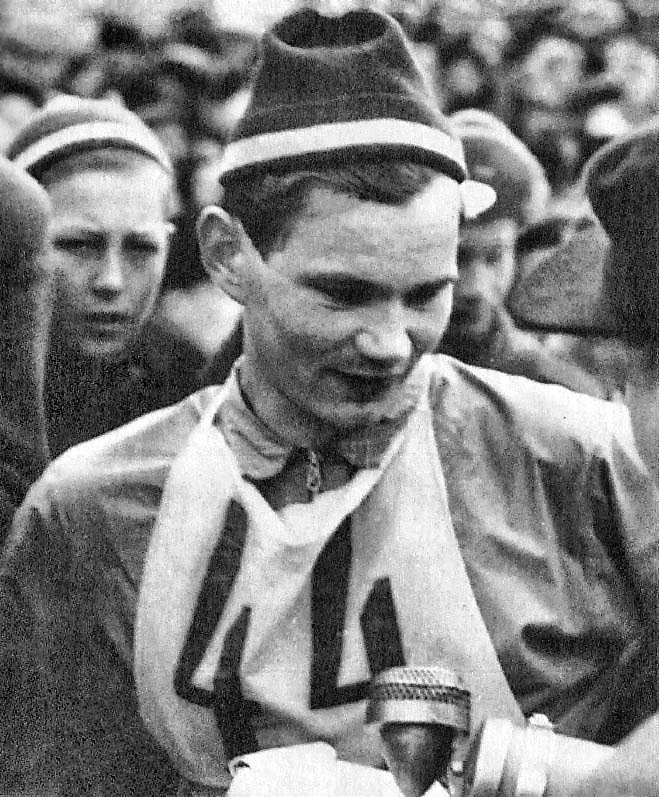

Personal information
- Born: 29 June 1921 Rautalahti, Karelia, Finland
- Died: 22 July 1975 (aged 54) Heinolan maalaiskunta, Finland

Sport
- Sport: Cross-country skiing
- Club: Ounasvaaran Hiihtoseura, Rovaniemi
Medal record
Men's cross-country skiing
Representing Finland
Olympic Games
Bronze medal – third place	1948 St. Moritz	50 km

Benjam "Benjamin" Vanninen (29 June 1921 – 22 July 1975) was a Finnish cross-country skier. He won a bronze medal in the 50 km event at the 1948 Winter Olympics, 20 seconds ahead of his elder brother Pekka. Vanninen never won a Finnish title, but won the 50 km race at the Lahti Ski Games in 1946 and 1948 and at Ounasvaara in 1946 and 1947. After retiring from competitions he worked as a customs officer, merchant, and manufacturer of skating equipment and ski wax.

== Cross-country skiing results ==
All results are sourced from the International Ski Federation (FIS).

=== Olympic Games ===
- 1 medal – (1 bronze)

Year	Age	18 km	50 km	4 × 10 km relay
1948	26	—	—	Bronze
