= Cross-country skiing at the 1948 Winter Olympics – Men's 4 × 10 kilometre relay =

Men's 4 × 10 kilometre relay at the V Olympic Winter Games
- Cross-country skiing
- Date: 3 February 1948
- Competitors: 44 from 11 nations
- Winning time: 2:32:08

Medalists
1st place, gold medalist(s)		Nils Östensson; Nils Täpp; Gunnar Eriksson; Martin Lundström	Sweden
2nd place, silver medalist(s)		Lauri Silvennoinen; Teuvo Laukkanen; Sauli Rytky; August Kiuru	Finland
3rd place, bronze medalist(s)		Erling Evensen; Olav Økern; Reidar Nyborg; Olav Hagen	Norway

The men's 4 × 10 kilometre relay cross-country skiing event was part of the cross-country skiing at the 1948 Winter Olympics programme. It was the second appearance of the event. The competition was held on Tuesday, 3 February 1948. Forty-four cross-country skiers from eleven nations competed.

== Medalists ==
Gold	Silver	Bronze
Sweden; Gunnar Eriksson; Martin Lundström; Nils Östensson; Nils Täpp	Finland; August Kiuru; Teuvo Laukkanen; Sauli Rytky; Lauri Silvennoinen	Norway; Erling Evensen; Olav Hagen; Reidar Nyborg; Olav Økern

== Results ==
Place	Competitor	Time
1
1	Sweden	2'32:08
1	Nils Östensson	36:16
1	Nils Täpp	37:14
1	Gunnar Eriksson	38:27
1	Martin Lundström	40:11
2
2	Finland	2'41:06
2	Lauri Silvennoinen	38:11
2	Teuvo Laukkanen	38:16
2	Sauli Rytky	40:30
2	August Kiuru	44:09
3
3	Norway	2'44:33
3	Erling Evensen	40:15
3	Olav Økern	38:37
3	Reidar Nyborg	41:39
3	Olav Hagen	44:02
4
4	Austria	2'47:18
4	Josl Gstrein	40:02
4	Josef Deutschmann	40:46
4	Engelbert Hundertpfund	42:09
4	Karl Rafreider	44:21
5
5	Switzerland	2'48:07
5	Niklaus Stump	41:08
5	Robert Zurbriggen	40:22
5	Max Müller	42:05
5	Edi Schild	44:32
6
6	Italy	2'51:00
6	Vincenzo Perruchon	41:50
6	Silvio Confortola	41:18
6	Rizzieri Rodeghiero	41:51
6	Severino Compagnoni	46:01
7
7	France	2'51:53
7	René Jeandel	42:54
7	Gérard Perrier	42:28
7	Marius Mora	42:43
7	Benoît Carrara	43:48
8
8	Czechoslovakia	2'54:56
8	Štefan Kovalčík	42:57
8	František Balvín	43:12
8	Jaroslav Zajíček	44:53
8	Jaroslav Cardal	43:54
9
9	Yugoslavia	2'55:55
9	Tone Razinger	41:16
9	Tone Pogačnik	43:08
9	Matevž Kordež	45:01
9	Jože Knific	46:30
10
10	Poland	2'59:19
10	Józef Daniel Krzeptowski	43:03
10	Stanisław Bukowski	44:22
10	Tadeusz Kwapień	43:29
10	Stefan Dziedzic	48:25
11
11	Liechtenstein	3'35:39
11	Christof Frommelt	47:25
11	Arthur Meier	52:51
11	Xaver Frick	58:21
11	Egon Matt	57:02
