= Nils Täpp =

Swedish cross-country skier

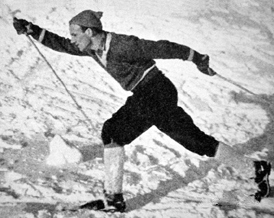
- Nils Täpp around 1950

Personal information
- Full name: Nils Bertil Täpp
- Born: 27 October 1917 Malung, Sweden
- Died: 23 October 2000 (aged 82) Malung, Sweden

Sport
- Sport: Cross-country skiing
- Club: Malungs IF (−1945); Sågmyra IF (1946); Östersunds SK
Medal record
Men's cross-country skiing
Representing Sweden
Olympic Games
Gold medal – first place	1948 St. Moritz	4 × 10 km relay
Bronze medal – third place	1952 Oslo	4 × 10 km relay
World Championships
Gold medal – first place	1950 Lake Placid	4 × 10 km relay

Nils Bertil Täpp (27 October 1917 – 23 October 2000) was a Swedish cross-country skier. He was part of the Swedish 4 × 10 km relay teams that won gold medals at the 1948 Winter Olympics and 1950 FIS Nordic World Ski Championships. At the 1952 Olympics he finished seventh in the individual 18 km race and won a bronze medal in the 4 × 10 km relay. He was the Swedish national champion in the 15 km (1943 and 1946) and 3 × 10 km relay (1942, 1943 and 1949).

He was born Nils Bertil Persson and changed his last name to Täpp in 1945.

== Cross-country skiing results ==
=== Olympic Games ===
- 2 medals – (1 gold, 1 bronze)

Year	Age	18 km	50 km	4 × 10 km relay
1948	30	—	—	Gold
1952	34	7	—	Bronze

=== World Championships ===
- 1 medal – (1 gold)

Year	Age	18 km	50 km	4 × 10 km relay
1950	32	—	—	Gold
