= Gunnar Eriksson =

Swedish cross-country skier

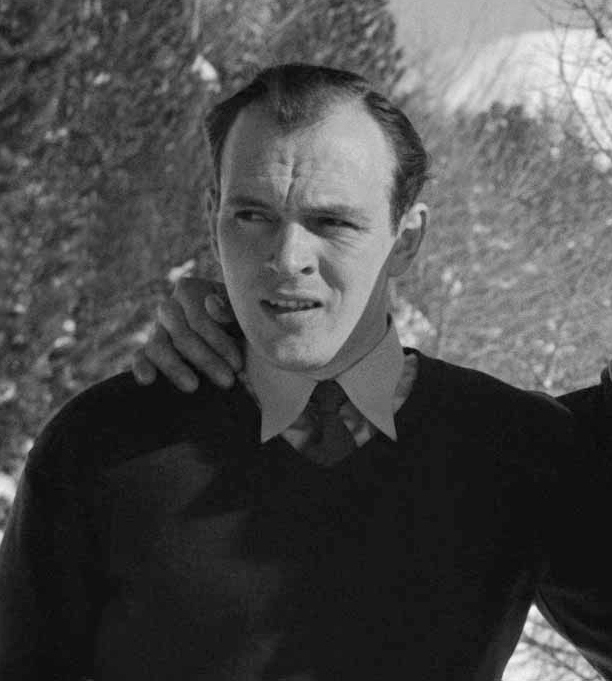
- Eriksson at the 1948 Olympics

Personal information
- Born: 13 September 1921 Östnor, Sweden
- Died: 8 July 1982 (aged 60) Mora Municipality, Sweden

Sport
- Sport: Cross-country skiing
- Club: IFK Mora SK
Medal record
Men's cross-country skiing
Representing Sweden
Olympic Games
Gold medal – first place	1948 St. Moritz	4 × 10 km relay
Bronze medal – third place	1948 St. Moritz	18 km
World Championships
Gold medal – first place	1950 Lake Placid	50 km

Krång Erik Gunnar Eriksson (13 September 1921 – 8 July 1982) was a Swedish cross-country skier who won two medals at the 1948 Winter Olympics, a gold in the 4 × 10 km relay and a bronze in the individual 18 km. Eriksson won the 50 km event at the 1950 FIS Nordic World Ski Championships, but finished 12th at the 1952 Olympics and 21st at the 1954 World Championships.

Eriksson had five brothers and three sisters. Their father died aged 42, and the children had to start working in their teens at the local knife factory; in 1946 they started their own hardware business. Eriksson married Kerstin Norlin, the winner of the 1949 Vasa ski marathon, who lived next door. She died aged 38. After retiring from competitions in 1954 Eriksson spent time collecting stamps, fishing, hunting and working as timberjack. In 1980 he developed Lou Gehrig’s disease and died in July 1982.

== Cross-country skiing results ==
All results are sourced from the International Ski Federation (FIS).

=== Olympic Games ===
- 2 medals – (1 gold, 1 bronze)

Year	Age	18 km	50 km	4 × 10 km relay
1948	27	Bronze	—	Gold
1952	31	—	12	—

=== World Championships ===
- 1 medal – (1 gold)

Year	Age	18 km	50 km	4 × 10 km relay
1950	29	—	Gold	—
