= Nils Östensson =

Swedish cross-country skier

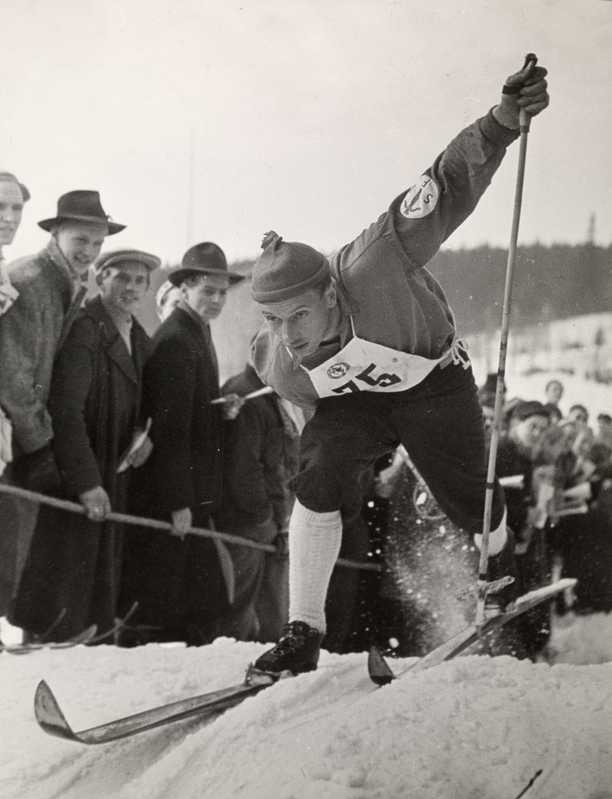

Medal record

Men's cross-country skiing

Representing Sweden

Olympic Games
Gold medal – first place	1948 St. Moritz	4 × 10 km relay
Silver medal – second place	1948 St. Moritz	18 km

Nils Holger Östensson (29 April 1918, Transtrand, Dalarna – 24 July 1949 at the same place) was a Swedish cross-country skier who competed in the 1940s. He won the 4 × 10 km relay gold and the 18 km silver at the 1948 Winter Olympics in St. Moritz.

Östensson also won the 18 km and 50 km events at the Holmenkollen ski festival in 1949.

He died in a motorcycle accident on 24 July 1949.

== Cross-country skiing results ==
All results are sourced from the International Ski Federation (FIS).

=== Olympic Games ===
- 2 medals – (1 gold, 1 silver)

Year	Age	18 km	50 km	4 × 10 km relay
1948	29	Silver	—	Gold
