= Martin Lundström =

Swedish cross-country skier

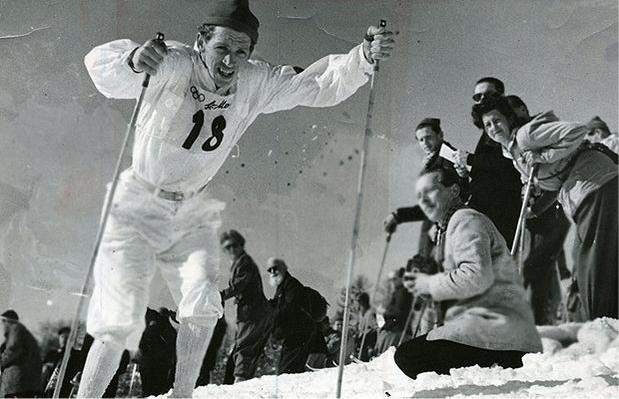

Personal information
- Born: 30 May 1918 Norsjö, Sweden
- Died: 30 June 2016 (aged 98) Umeå, Sweden

Sport
- Sport: Cross-country skiing
- Club: IFK Umeå
Medal record
Men's cross-country skiing
Representing Sweden
Olympic Games
Gold medal – first place	1948 St. Moritz	18 km
Gold medal – first place	1948 St. Moritz	4 × 10 km relay
Bronze medal – third place	1952 Oslo	4 × 10 km relay
World Championships
Gold medal – first place	1950 Lake Placid	4 × 10 km relay

Martin Lundström (30 May 1918 – 30 June 2016) was a Swedish cross-country skier who competed in the late 1940s and early 1950s. He was born in Tvärliden, Norsjö Municipality.

Lundström won two Olympic gold medals during the 1948 Winter Olympics in Saint-Moritz, Switzerland at the 18 km and 4 × 10 km relay events. He also won a bronze medal in the 4 × 10 km relay at the 1952 Winter Olympics. Lundström also won at the 18 km event at the Holmenkollen ski festival in 1948. Additionally, he won a gold in the 4 × 10 km relay at the 1950 FIS Nordic World Ski Championships. He died in June 2016 at the age of 98.

== Cross-country skiing results ==
All results are sourced from the International Ski Federation (FIS).

=== Olympic Games ===
- 3 medals – (2 gold, 1 bronze)

Year	Age	18 km	50 km	4 × 10 km relay
1948	29	Gold	—	Gold
1952	33	—	—	Bronze

=== World Championships ===
- 1 medal – (1 gold)

Year	Age	18 km	50 km	4 × 10 km relay
1950	31	—	—	Gold
