= Cross-country skiing at the 1948 Winter Olympics – Men's 50 kilometre =

Men's 50 kilometre at the V Olympic Winter Games
- Cross-country skiing
- Dates: 6 February 1948
- Competitors: 28 from 9 nations
- Winning time: 3:47:48

Medalists
1st place, gold medalist(s)		Nils Karlsson	Sweden
2nd place, silver medalist(s)		Harald Eriksson	Sweden
3rd place, bronze medalist(s)		Benjamin Vanninen	Finland

The 50 kilometre cross-country skiing event was part of the cross-country skiing at the 1948 Winter Olympics programme. It was the fifth appearance of the event. The competition was held on Friday, 6 February 1948. Twenty-eight cross-country skiers from nine nations competed.

== Medalists ==
Gold	Silver	Bronze
Nils Karlsson; Sweden	Harald Eriksson; Sweden	Benjamin Vanninen; Finland

== Results ==
Place	Competitor	Time
1	Nils Karlsson (SWE)	3'47:48
2	Harald Eriksson (SWE)	3'52:20
3	Benjamin Vanninen (FIN)	3'57:28
4	Pekka Vanninen (FIN)	3'57:58
5	Anders Törnkvist (SWE)	3'58:20
6	Edi Schild (SUI)	4'05:37
7	Pekka Kuvaja (FIN)	4'10:02
8	Jaroslav Cardal (TCH)	4'14:34
9	Kristian Bjørn (NOR)	4'15:21
10	Martin Jære (NOR)	4'17:11
11	František Balvín (TCH)	4'17:51
12	Josl Gstrein (AUT)	4'21:13
13	Cristiano Rodeghiero (ITA)	4'24:12
14	Jože Knific (YUG)	4'26:00
15	Franc Smolej (YUG)	4'26:12
16	Matevž Kordež (YUG)	4'27:25
17	Max Müller (SUI)	4'30:51
18	Silvio Confortola (ITA)	4'31:36
19	Louis Bourban (SUI)	4'33:50
20	Jaroslav Zajíček (TCH)	4'44:35
–	Vít Fousek Sr. (TCH)	DNF
–	Victor Borghi (ITA)	DNF
–	Thorleif Vangen (NOR)	DNF
–	Stefano Sommariva (ITA)	DNF
–	Arthur Herrdin (SWE)	DNF
–	Leif Haugen (NOR)	DNF
–	Tom Dennie (CAN)	DNF
–	Martti Sipilä (FIN)	DNF
