= Cross-country skiing at the 1948 Winter Olympics =

Cross-country skiing at the V Olympic Winter Games
- Dates: 3–6 February
- No. of events: 3
- Competitors: 106 from 15 nations

At the 1948 Winter Olympics, three cross-country skiing events were contested. The 18 km competition was held on Saturday, 31 January 1948, the relay event was held on Tuesday, 3 February 1948, and the 50 km event was held on Friday, 6 February 1948.

== Medal summary ==
=== Medal table ===
Rank	Nation	Gold	Silver	Bronze	Total
1	Sweden	3	2	1	6
2	Finland	0	1	1	2
3	Norway	0	0	1	1
Totals (3 entries)		3	3	3	9

=== Events ===
Event	Gold		Silver		Bronze	
18 km	Martin Lundström; Sweden	1:13:50	Nils Östensson; Sweden	1:14:22	Gunnar Eriksson; Sweden	1:16:06
50 km	Nils Karlsson; Sweden	3:47:48	Harald Eriksson; Sweden	3:52:20	Benjamin Vanninen; Finland	3:57:28
4 × 10 km relay	Sweden; Gunnar Eriksson; Martin Lundström; Nils Östensson; Nils Täpp	2:32:08	Finland; August Kiuru; Teuvo Laukkanen; Sauli Rytky; Lauri Silvennoinen	2:41:06	Norway; Erling Evensen; Olav Hagen; Reidar Nyborg; Olav Økern	2:44:33

== Participating nations ==
Seven cross-country skiers competed in all three events.

A total of 106 cross-country skiers from 15 nations competed at the St. Moritz Games:

- Austria (8)
- Bulgaria (2)
- Canada (2)
- Czechoslovakia (9)
- Finland (13)
- France (7)
- Hungary (2)
- Italy (9)
- Liechtenstein (5)
- Norway (12)
- Poland (5)
- Sweden (11)
- Switzerland (10)
- United States (5)
- Yugoslavia (6)
