= Alpine skiing at the 1948 Winter Olympics – Men's downhill =

Men's Downhill at the V Olympic Winter Games
- Alpine skiing
- Venue: St. Moritz, Switzerland
- Date: 2 February 1948
- Competitors: 111 from 25 nations
- Winning time: 2:55.0

Medalists
1st place, gold medalist(s)		Henri Oreiller	France
2nd place, silver medalist(s)		Franz Gabl	Austria
3rd place, bronze medalist(s)		Karl Molitor	Switzerland
3rd place, bronze medalist(s)		Rolf Olinger	Switzerland

The men's alpine skiing downhill event was part of the alpine skiing at the 1948 Winter Olympics programme. It was the first appearance of the event and the competition was held on Monday, 2 February 1948.

One hundred and eleven alpine skiers from 25 nations competed. Henri Oreiller of France won the first of his two gold medals at these Olympics; he also won the combined and won a bronze medal in slalom.

== Results ==
This race was also part of the alpine combined event.

Place	Competitor	Nation	Time	Difference
1st place, gold medalist(s)	Henri Oreiller	France	2:55.0	
2nd place, silver medalist(s)	Franz Gabl	Austria	2:59.1	+4.1
3rd place, bronze medalist(s)	Karl Molitor	Switzerland	3:00.3	+5.3
3rd place, bronze medalist(s)	Rolf Olinger	Switzerland	3:00.3	+5.3
5	Egon Schöpf	Austria	3:01.2	+6.2
6	Silvio Alverà	Italy	3:02.4	+7.4
6	Carlo Gartner	Italy	3:02.4	+7.4
8	Fernand Grosjean	Switzerland	3:03.1	+8.1
9	Hans Nogler	Austria	3:03.2	+8.2
10	Hans Hansson	Sweden	3:05.0	+10.0
11	Sverre Lassen-Urdahl	Norway	3:06.4	+11.4
11	Adolf Odermatt	Switzerland	3:06.4	+11.4
13	James Couttet	France	3:07.3	+12.3
14	Engelbert Haider	Austria	3:08.2	+13.2
15	Eberhard Kneisl	Austria	3:08.3	+13.3
16	Bjarne Arentz	Norway	3:09.0	+14.0
17	Antonín Šponar	Czechoslovakia	3:09.1	+14.1
18	Romedi Spada	Switzerland	3:09.2	+14.2
19	Edi Mall	Austria	3:09.3	+14.3
20	Marius Eriksen	Norway	3:09.4	+14.4
21	Vittorio Chierroni	Italy	3:10.0	+15.0
22	Edy Reinalter	Switzerland	3:11.0	+16.0
23	Guy de Huertas	France	3:12.0	+17.0
23	Georges Panisset	France	3:12.0	+17.0
25	Sverre Johannessen	Norway	3:12.1	+17.1
26	Jack Reddish	United States	3:12.3	+17.3
27	Luboš Brchel	Czechoslovakia	3:12.4	+17.4
28	Harvey Clifford	Canada	3:14.1	+19.1
28	Hector Sutherland	Canada	3:14.1	+19.1
30	Sixten Isberg	Sweden	3:15.0	+20.0
31	Stein Eriksen	Norway	3:15.1	+20.1
32	Eugenio Bonicco	Italy	3:15.4	+20.4
33	Jean Pazzi	France	3:16.1	+21.1
34	Claude Penz	France	3:19.2	+24.2
35	Józef Marusarz	Poland	3:20.2	+25.2
36	Tine Mulej	Yugoslavia	3:21.1	+26.1
37	Jan Gąsienica Ciaptak	Poland	3:21.3	+26.2
38	Åke Nilsson	Sweden	3:22.2	+27.2
39	Pentti Alonen	Finland	3:22.3	+27.3
40	Stig Sollander	Sweden	3:23.1	+28.1
41	Olle Dalman	Sweden	3:23.2	+28.2
42	Richard Movitz	United States	3:25.2	+30.2
43	Steve Knowlton	United States	3:26.2	+31.2
44	Robert Blatt	United States	3:27.4	+32.4
45	Devereaux Jennings	United States	3:28.2	+33.2
46	Daniel Šlachta	Czechoslovakia	3:29.4	+34.4
47	Barney McLean	United States	3:30.1	+35.1
48	Péter Szikla	Hungary	3:30.4	+35.4
49	Sándor Mazány	Hungary	3:31.4	+36.4
50	Michel Feron	Belgium	3:34.3	+39.3
51	Radu Scîrneci	Romania	3:35.0	+40.0
52	Tamás Székely	Hungary	3:36.0	+41.0
53	Aimo Vartiainen	Finland	3:36.4	+41.4
54	Slavko Lukanc	Yugoslavia	3:37.1	+42.1
55	Franz Beck	Liechtenstein	3:38.3	+43.3
56	Albert Irwin	Canada	3:39.1	+44.1
57	Dumitru Frăţilă	Romania	3:39.3	+44.3
58	Dumitru Sulică	Romania	3:39.4	+44.4
59	Hernán Oelkers	Chile	3:40.2	+45.2
60	Donald Garrow	Great Britain	3:41.3	+46.3
60	Wilbur Irwin	Canada	3:41.3	+46.3
62	David Madzhar	Bulgaria	3:45.3	+50.3
63	Justo del Carril	Argentina	3:46.2	+51.2
64	Magnús Brynjólfsson	Iceland	3:48.2	+53.2
65	Károly Kővári	Hungary	3:49.1	+54.1
66	Ion Coliban	Romania	3:49.2	+54.2
67	Jerzy Schindler	Poland	3:49.4	+54.4
68	Luis de Ridder	Argentina	3:50.2	+55.2
69	Matevž Lukanc	Yugoslavia	3:50.3	+55.3
70	Philippe d'Ursel	Belgium	3:51.0	+56.0
71	Mihai Bîră	Romania	3:52.3	+57.3
71	Ciril Praček	Yugoslavia	3:52.3	+57.3
73	Max Gassner	Liechtenstein	3:53.0	+58.0
74	Vasile Ionescu	Romania	3:54.1	+59.1
74	Arturo Hammersley	Chile	3:54.1	+59.1
74	James Palmer-Tomkinson	Great Britain	3:54.1	+59.1
77	György Libik	Hungary	3:55.3	+1:00.3
78	Jaime Errázuriz	Chile	3:56.4	+1:01.4
79	Leopold Schädler	Liechtenstein	4:00.0	+1:05.0
80	Jože Bertoncelj	Yugoslavia	4:00.2	+1:05.2
81	Stuart Parkinson	Great Britain	4:03.0	+1:08.0
82	Dimitar Drazhev	Bulgaria	4:07.1	+1:12.1
83	Gonzalo Domínguez	Chile	4:08.3	+1:13.3
84	Lajos Máté	Hungary	4:09.0	+1:14.0
85	Otto Jung	Argentina	4:09.3	+1:14.3
86	José Arias	Spain	4:11.4	+1:16.4
87	Raşit Tolun	Turkey	4:12.1	+1:17.1
88	Harry Taylor	Great Britain	4:17.4	+1:22.4
89	Thomas de Morawitz	Spain	4:24.0	+1:29.0
90	Theodor Sele	Liechtenstein	4:24.1	+1:29.1
91	Gino de Pellegrín	Argentina	4:25.2	+1:30.2
92	Ian Appleyard	Great Britain	4:36.2	+1:41.2
92	Pablo Rosenkjer	Argentina	4:36.2	+1:41.2
94	Dursun Bozkurt	Turkey	4:37.3	+1:42.3
95	Julio Cernuda	Argentina	4:45.4	+1:50.4
96	Þórir Jónsson	Iceland	4:47.0	+1:52.0
97	Osman Yüce	Turkey	4:49.2	+1:54.2
98	Guðmundur Guðmundsson	Iceland	4:57.0	+2:02.0
99	Constantin von Liechtenstein	Liechtenstein	5:04.1	+2:09.1
100	José Vila	Spain	5:13.0	+2:18.0
101	Fotis Mavriplis	Greece	5:39.1	+2:44.1
102	Fernando Armiñán	Spain	5:41.2	+2:46.2
–	Zeno Colò	Italy	DNF	
–	Roberto Lacedelli	Italy	DNF	
–	Alfred Stäger	Switzerland	DNF	
–	Jan Pawlica	Poland	DNF	
–	Johnny Lunde	Norway	DNF	
–	Saša Molnar	Yugoslavia	DNF	
–	Peter Boumphrey	Great Britain	DNF	
–	Ibrahim Geagea	Lebanon	DQ	
–	Muzaffer Demirhan	Turkey	DQ	
