= Alpine skiing at the 1948 Winter Olympics – Men's combined =

Men's combined at the V Olympic Winter Games
- Alpine skiing
- Venue: St. Moritz, Switzerland
- Date: 4 February 1948
- Winning time: 3.27 points

Medalists
1st place, gold medalist(s)		Henri Oreiller	France
2nd place, silver medalist(s)		Karl Molitor	Switzerland
3rd place, bronze medalist(s)		James Couttet	France

The men's alpine skiing combined event was part of the alpine skiing at the 1948 Winter Olympics programme. It was the second appearance of the event. The competition consisted of a downhill race held on Monday, 2 February and two slalom heats held on Wednesday, 4 February 1948. Seventy-nine alpine skiers from 24 nations competed.

== Results ==
=== Downhill ===
The only men's downhill race was held on Monday, 2 February. Seventy-eight of the 102 finishers of this downhill race also competed in the first slalom heat of the combined event.

=== Slalom ===
The two-run slalom race of the combined event was held on Wednesday, 4 February.

Place	Downhill	Competitor	1st run	2nd run	Time	Difference	Points
1	13	James Couttet (FRA)	68.7	66.2	134.9		0.00
2	19	Edi Mall (AUT)	69.5	66.5	136.0	+1.1	0.48
3	21	Vittorio Chierroni (ITA)	70.8	67.3	138.1	+3.2	1.41
4	22	Edy Reinalter (SUI)	76.3	65.8	142.1	+7.2	3.18
5	1	Henri Oreiller (FRA)	72.3	70.0	142.3	+7.4	3.27
6	3	Karl Molitor (SUI)	74.0	68.5	142.5	+7.6	3.35
6	17	Antonín Šponar (TCH)	73.1	69.4	142.5	+7.6	3.35
8	26	Jack Reddish (USA)	74.1	68.8	142.9	+8.0	3.53
9	10	Hans Hansson (SWE)	73.5	70.0	143.5	+8.6	3.79
10	38	Åke Nilsson (SWE)	75.3	69.4	144.7	+9.8	4.32
11	6	Silvio Alverà (ITA)	75.3	69.6	144.9	+10.0	4.41
12	15	Eberhard Kneisl (AUT)	78.1	67.8	145.9	+11.0	4.85
13	27	Luboš Brchel (TCH)	79.1	67.2	146.3	+11.4	5.03
14	9	Hans Nogler (AUT)	72.2	74.8	147.0	+12.1	5.33
15	47	Barney McLean (USA)	76.4	71.5	147.9	+13.0	5.73
16	14	Engelbert Haider (AUT)	76.4	71.8	148.2	+13.3	5.86
17	17	Steve Knowlton (USA)	75.5	74.0	149.5	+14.6	6.43
18	23	Georges Panisset (FRA)	79.8	75.5	155.3	+20.4	9.00
19	11	Adolf Odermatt (SUI)	79.8	75.8	155.6	+20.7	9.13
20	48	Péter Szikla (HUN)	84.1	72.1	156.2	+21.3	9.39
21	16	Bjarne Arentz (NOR)	80.8	75.5	156.3	+21.4	9.44
22	34	Claude Penz (FRA)	74.7	81.8	156.5	+21.6	9.52
23	34	Robert Blatt (USA)	75.6	81.4	157.0	+22.1	9.74
23	28	Harvey Clifford (CAN)	86.8	70.2	157.0	+22.1	9.74
25	28	Hector Sutherland (CAN)	82.8	77.3	160.1	+25.2	11.12
26	39	Pentti Alonen (FIN)	89.0	71.2	160.2	+25.3	11.16
27	20	Marius Eriksen (NOR)	81.6	79.4	161.0	+26.1	11.51
27	25	Sverre Johannessen (NOR)	86.2	74.8	161.0	+26.1	11.51
29	35	Józef Marusarz (POL)	83.2	78.8	162.0	+27.1	11.95
30	8	Fernand Grosjean (SUI)	79.6	82.7*	162.3	+27.4	12.09
31	69	Matevž Lukanc (YUG)	89.3	73.1	162.4	+27.5	12.13
32	54	Slavko Lukanc (YUG)	87.1	75.4	162.5	+27.6	12.17
33	60	Wilbur Irwin (CAN)	92.9	72.7	165.6	+30.7	13.54
34	70	Philippe d'Ursel (BEL)	91.4	75.8	167.2	+32.3	14.24
35	52	Tamás Székely (HUN)	88.4	80.9	169.3	+34.4	15.17
36	46	Daniel Šlachta (TCH)	97.4*	72.0	169.4	+34.5	15.21
37	66	Ion Coliban (ROU)	96.0	75.4	171.4	+36.5	16.10
38	37	Jan Gąsienica Ciaptak (POL)	85.0	87.2*	172.2	+37.3	16.45
39	59	Hernán Oelkers (CHI)	93.6	81.6	175.2	+40.3	17.78
40	65	Károly Kővári (HUN)	92.5	84.2	176.7	+41.8	18.44
41	79	Poldi Schädler (LIE)	100.0	77.1	177.1	+42.2	18.62
42	62	David Madzhar (BUL)	98.9	78.5	177.4	+42.5	18.75
43	80	Jože Bertoncelj (YUG)	98.5	79.6	178.1	+43.2	19.06
44	57	Dumitru Frăţilă (ROU)	101.7	81.4	183.1	+48.2	21.27
44	60	Donald Garrow (GBR)	96.8*	86.3	183.1	+48.2	21.27
46	31	Stein Eriksen (NOR)	111.8*	71.5	183.3	+48.4	21.36
47	58	Dumitru Sulică (ROU)	101.5	82.8	184.3	+49.4	21.80
48	86	José Arias (ESP)	102.6	84.5*	187.1	+52.2	23.03
49	64	Magnús Brynjólfsson (ISL)	99.0	88.7*	187.7	+52.8	23.29
50	91	Gino de Pellegrín (ARG)	100.8	87.2	188.0	+53.1	23.42
51	90	Theodor Sele (LIE)	97.5	90.8	188.3	+53.4	23.56
52	89	Thomas Morawitz (ESP)	104.4	84.8	189.2	+54.3	23.95
53	55	Franz Beck (LIE)	106.2	83.8	190.0	+55.1	24.31
54	50	Michel Feron (BEL)	103.0	87.8	190.8	+55.9	24.67
55	85	Otto Jung (ARG)	105.2	86.1	191.3	+56.4	24.89
56	82	Dimitar Drazhev (BUL)	109.0*	84.7	193.7	+58.8	25.94
57	78	Jaime Errázuriz (CHI)	101.1	94.6	195.7	+1:00.8	26.82
58	96	Þórir Jónsson (ISL)	117.0	80.5	197.5	+1:02.6	27.61
59	92	Pablo Rosenkjer (ARG)	105.3	94.6	199.9	+1:05.0	28.68
60	74	Vasile Ionescu (ROU)	105.8	94.4	200.2	+1:05.3	28.81
61	56	Albert Irwin (CAN)	122.0*	78.9	200.9	+1:06.0	29.12
62	88	Harry Taylor (GBR)	105.8	97.8	203.6	+1:08.7	30.31
63	74	Arturo Hammersley (CHI)	122.5*	95.5*	218.0	+1:23.1	36.65
64	98	Guðmundur Guðmundsson (ISL)	135.8	84.8	220.6	+1:25.7	37.81
65	73	Max Gassner (LIE)	129.0	106.9	235.9	+1:41.0	44.56
66	84	Lajos Máté (HUN)	139.3	106.2	245.4	+1:50.5	48.79
67	68	Luis de Ridder (ARG)	166.3	80.9	247.2	+1:52.3	49.54
–	40	Stig Sollander (SWE)					DNF
–	41	Olle Dalman (SWE)					DNF
–	67	Jerzy Schindler (POL)					DNF
–	83	Gonzalo Domínguez (CHI)					DNF
–	74	James Palmer-Tomkinson (GBR)					DNF
–	94	Dursun Bozkurt (TUR)					DNF
–	97	Osman Yüce (TUR)					DNF
–	100	José Vila (ESP)					DNF
–	101	Fotios Mavriplis (GRE)					DNF
–	102	Juan Armiñán (ESP)					DNF
–		Munir Itani (LIB)					DNF
–	53	Aimo Vartiainen (FIN)					DQ

* 5 seconds penalty included.

=== Final standings ===
Place	Competitor	Downhill points	Slalom points	Total
1st place, gold medalist(s)	Henri Oreiller (FRA)	0.00	3.27	3.27
2nd place, silver medalist(s)	Karl Molitor (SUI)	3.09	3.35	6.44
3rd place, bronze medalist(s)	James Couttet (FRA)	6.95	0.00	6.95
4	Edi Mall (AUT)	8.06	0.48	8.54
5	Silvio Alverà (ITA)	4.30	4.41	8.71
6	Hans Hansson (SWE)	5.52	3.79	9.31
7	Vittorio Chierroni (ITA)	8.28	1.41	9.69
8	Hans Nogler (AUT)	4.63	5.33	9.96
9	Antonín Šponar (TCH)	7.84	3.35	11.19
10	Edy Reinalter (SUI)	8.83	3.18	12.01
11	Eberhard Kneisl (AUT)	7.51	4.85	12.36
12	Jack Reddish (USA)	9.71	3.53	13.24
13	Engelbert Haider (AUT)	7.40	5.86	13.26
14	Luboš Brchel (TCH)	9.82	5.03	14.85
15	Adolf Odermatt (SUI)	6.51	9.13	15.64
16	Fernand Grosjean (SUI)	4.52	12.09	16.61
17	Bjarne Arentz (NOR)	7.73	9.44	17.17
18	Georges Panisset (FRA)	9.38	9.00	18.38
19	Åke Nilsson (SWE)	15.11	4.32	19.43
20	Marius Eriksen (NOR)	8.17	11.51	19.68
21	Harvey Clifford (CAN)	10.60	9.74	20.34
22	Sverre Johannesen (NOR)	9.49	11.51	21.00
23	Hector Sutherland (CAN)	10.60	11.12	21.72
24	Claude Penz (FRA)	13.46	9.52	22.98
25	Steve Knowlton (USA)	17.32	6.43	23.75
26	Barney McLean (USA)	19.42	5.73	25.15
27	Józef Marusarz (POL)	14.01	11.95	25.96
28	Pentti Alonen (FIN)	15.22	11.16	26.38
29	Robert Blatt (USA)	18.09	9.74	27.83
30	Péter Szikla (HUN)	19.75	9.39	29.14
31	Jan Gąsienica Ciaptak (POL)	14.67	16.45	31.12
32	Stein Eriksen (NOR)	11.14	21.36	32.50
33	Daniel Šlachta (TCH)	19.20	15.21	34.41
34	Slavko Lukanc (YUG)	23.28	12.17	35.45
35	Tamás Székely (HUN)	22.62	15.17	37.79
36	Wilbur Irwin (CAN)	25.71	13.54	39.25
37	Matevž Lukanc (YUG)	30.68	12.13	42.81
38	Hernán Oelkers (CHI)	25.05	17.78	42.83
39	Philippe d'Ursel (BEL)	30.90	14.24	45.14
40	Dumitru Frăţilă (ROU)	24.61	21.27	45.88
41	Ion Coliban (ROU)	30.02	16.10	46.12
42	Michel Feron (BEL)	21.85	24.67	46.52
42	Dumitru Sulică (ROU)	24.72	21.80	46.52
44	David Madzhar (BUL)	27.92	18.75	46.67
45	Donald Garrow (GBR)	25.71	21.27	46.98
46	Károly Kővári (HUN)	29.91	18.44	48.35
47	Franz Beck (LIE)	24.06	24.31	48.37
48	Magnús Brynjólfsson (ISL)	29.47	23.29	52.76
49	Albert Irwin (CAN)	25.71	29.12	53.51
50	Poldi Schädler (LIE)	35.86	18.62	54.48
51	Jože Bertoncelj (YUG)	36.08	19.06	55.14
52	Jaime Errázuriz (CHI)	34.09	26.82	60.91
53	Vasile Ionescu (ROU)	32.67	28.81	61.48
54	José Arias (ESP)	42.37	23.03	65.40
55	Dimitar Drazhev (BUL)	39.83	25.94	65.77
56	Otto Jung (ARG)	41.16	24.89	66.05
57	Arturo Hammersley (CHI)	32.67	36.65	69.32
58	Theodor Sele (LIE)	49.22	23.56	72.78
59	Thomas Morawitz (ESP)	49.11	23.95	73.06
60	Gino de Pellegrín (ARG)	49.87	23.42	73.29
61	Harry Taylor (GBR)	45.68	30.31	75.99
62	Max Gassner (LIE)	32.00	44.56	76.56
63	Luis de Ridder (ARG)	30.57	49.54	80.11
64	Pablo Rosenkjer (ARG)	55.94	28.68	84.62
65	Þórir Jónsson (ISL)	61.79	27.61	89.40
66	Lajos Máté (HUN)	40.83	48.79	89.62
67	Guðmundur Guðmundsson (ISL)	67.30	37.81	105.11
–	Stig Sollander (SWE)	16.10	—	DNF
–	Olle Dalman (SWE)	16.21	—	DNF
–	Aimo Vartiainen (FIN)	22.86	—	DNF
–	Jerzy Schindler (POL)	30.12	—	DNF
–	James Palmer-Tomkinson (GBR)	32.67	—	DNF
–	Gonzalo Domínguez (CHI)	40.41	—	DNF
–	Dursun Bozkurt (TUR)	56.54	—	DNF
–	Osman Yüce (TUR)	63.00	—	DNF
–	José Vila (ESP)	76.10	—	DNF
–	Fotios Mavriplis (GRE)	90.46	—	DNF
–	Fernando Armiñán (ESP)	91.62	—	DNF
