= Alpine skiing at the 1948 Winter Olympics – Men's slalom =

The men's alpine skiing slalom event was part of the alpine skiing at the 1948 Winter Olympics programme. It was the first appearance of the event. The competition consisted of was held on Thursday, February 5, 1948. Seventy-seven alpine skiers from 22 nations competed.

== Medalists ==
| Gold | Silver | Bronze |
|---|---|---|
| Edy Reinalter; Switzerland | James Couttet; France | Henri Oreiller; France |

== Results ==
Silvio Alverà set the best time in the first heat, but finished without a medal. Edy Reinalter who was third after the first heat, set the fastest time in the second run and won the gold medal.

| Place | Competitor | 1st run | 2nd run | Total | Difference |
|---|---|---|---|---|---|
| 1 | Edy Reinalter (SUI) | 67.7 | 62.6 | 130.3 | — |
| 2 | James Couttet (FRA) | 67.5 | 63.3 | 130.8 | +0.5 |
| 3 | Henri Oreiller (FRA) | 68.0 | 64.8 | 132.8 | +2.5 |
| 4 | Silvio Alverà (ITA) | 67.4 | 65.8 | 133.2 | +2.9 |
| 5 | Olle Dalman (SWE) | 70.4 | 63.2 | 133.6 | +3.3 |
| 6 | Egon Schöpf (AUT) | 71.1 | 63.1 | 134.2 | +3.9 |
| 7 | Jack Reddish (USA) | 71.0 | 64.5 | 135.5 | +5.2 |
| 8 | Karl Molitor (SUI) | 70.2 | 66.0 | 136.2 | +5.9 |
| 9 | Luboš Brchel (TCH) | 70.8 | 65.8 | 136.6 | +6.3 |
| 10 | Sixten Isberg (SWE) | 70.7 | 66.5 | 137.2 | +6.9 |
| 11 | Hans Hansson (SWE) | 71.1 | 67.2 | 138.3 | +8.0 |
| 12 | Edi Mall (AUT) | 72.2 | 66.1 | 138.3 | +8.0 |
| 13 | Georges Schneider (SUI) | 71.9 | 66.5 | 138.4 | +8.1 |
| 14 | Zeno Colò (ITA) | 73.3 | 65.7 | 139.0 | +8.7 |
| 15 | Desirè Lacroix (FRA) | 69.9 | 70.0 | 139.9 | +9.6 |
| 16 | Steve Knowlton (USA) | 72.9 | 67.6 | 140.5 | +10.2 |
| 17 | Engelbert Haider (AUT) | 73.3 | 69.5 | 142.8 | +12.5 |
| 18 | Saša Molnar (YUG) | 71.4 | 72.0 | 143.4 | +13.1 |
| 19 | Harvey Clifford (CAN) | 73.5 | 70.2 | 143.7 | +13.4 |
| 20 | Colin Stewart (USA) | 75.3 | 68.8 | 144.1 | +13.8 |
| 21 | Aimo Vartiainen (FIN) | 74.0 | 71.0 | 145.0 | +14.7 |
| 22 | Antonín Šponar (TCH) | 75.2* | 66.5 | 146.7 | +16.4 |
| 23 | Bjarne Arentz (NOR) | 76.2 | 71.5 | 147.7 | +17.4 |
| 24 | Barney McLean (USA) | 80.5 | 67.6 | 148.1 | +17.8 |
| 25 | Péter Szikla (HUN) | 75.1 | 74.1 | 149.2 | +18.9 |
| 26 | Jack Nielsen (NOR) | 82.0 | 67.8 | 149.8 | +19.5 |
| 27 | Matevž Lukanc (YUG) | 77.2 | 73.7 | 150.9 | +20.6 |
| 28 | Hector Sutherland (CAN) | 79.2 | 72.0 | 151.2 | +20.9 |
| 29 | Stein Eriksen (NOR) | 84.4 | 68.0 | 152.4 | +22.1 |
| 30 | Vittorio Chierroni (ITA) | 87.0 | 65.5 | 152.5 | +22.2 |
| 31 | Józef Marusarz (POL) | 79.2 | 74.0 | 153.2 | +22.9 |
| 32 | Pentti Alonen (FIN) | 78.1 | 72.7* | 155.8 | +25.5 |
| 33 | Daniel Šlachta (TCH) | 81.0 | 77.7 | 158.7 | +28.4 |
| 34 | Claude Penz (FRA) | 84.2* | 70.9 | 160.1 | +29.8 |
| 35 | Tamás Székely (HUN) | 81.9* | 75.8 | 163.6 | +33.3 |
| 35 | Franci Čop (YUG) | 84.8 | 78.9 | 163.6 | +33.3 |
| 37 | Albert Irwin (CAN) | 89.4 | 76.6 | 166.0 | +35.7 |
| 38 | Dumitru Sulică (ROU) | 87.2 | 80.7 | 167.9 | +37.6 |
| 39 | Ion Coliban (ROU) | 90.1 | 78.8 | 168.9 | +38.6 |
| 40 | Valentin-Ture Mulej (YUG) | 75.0 | 96.0 | 171.0 | +40.7 |
| 41 | Alf Opheim (NOR) | 96.4 | 75.0 | 171.4 | +41.1 |
| 42 | Luis de Ridder (ARG) | 92.2 | 80.2 | 172.4 | +42.1 |
| 43 | Gino de Pellegrín (ARG) | 89.8 | 83.5 | 173.3 | +43.0 |
| 44 | Dimitar Drazhev (BUL) | 93.1 | 80.9 | 174.0 | +43.7 |
| 45 | José Arias (ESP) | 91.4 | 84.5 | 175.9 | +45.6 |
| 45 | Juan Poll (ESP) | 90.9 | 85.0 | 175.9 | +45.6 |
| 47 | David Madzhar (BUL) | 89.7 | 79.6 | 178.3 | +48.0 |
| 48 | Lajos Máté (HUN) | 100.1 | 80.5 | 180.6 | +50.3 |
| 49 | Donald Garrow (GBR) | 97.0 | 84.3 | 181.3 | +51.0 |
| 50 | Wilbur Irwin (CAN) | 100.4 | 81.2 | 181.6 | +51.3 |
| 51 | Thomas Morawitz (ESP) | 97.0 | 90.8 | 187.8 | +57.5 |
| 52 | Hernán Oelkers (CHI) | 104.2 | 84.8 | 189.0 | +58.7 |
| 53 | Otto Jung (ARG) | 114.1 | 81.6 | 195.7 | +1:05.4 |
| 54 | Arturo Hammersley (CHI) | 109.2 | 86.9 | 196.1 | +1:05.8 |
| 55 | Ian Appleyard (GBR) | 107.0 | 93.1 | 200.1 | +1:09.8 |
| 56 | Pablo Rosenkjer (ARG) | 108.7* | 94.2 | 207.9 | +1:17.6 |
| 57 | Béla Imre (ROU) | 117.4 | 100.3 | 217.7 | +1:27.4 |
| 58 | Raşit Tolun (TUR) | 124.8 | 97.2 | 222.0 | +1:31.7 |
| 59 | Guðmundur Guðmundsson (ISL) | 124.4* | 105.2 | 234.6 | +1:44.3 |
| 60 | Osman Yüce (TUR) | 136.2* | 107.4 | 248.6 | +1:58.3 |
| 61 | Harry Taylor (GBR) | 125.5 | 119.4* | 249.9 | +1:59.6 |
| 62 | Dursun Bozkurt (TUR) | 128.2** | 113.0 | 251.2 | +2:00.9 |
| 63 | John Boyagis (GBR) | 150.0 | 99.1* | 254.1 | +2:03.8 |
| 64 | Muzaffer Demirhan (TUR) | 145.5 | 120.2 | 265.7 | +2:15.4 |
| 65 | Ramón Blanco (ESP) | 138.5 | 129.0 | 267.5 | +2:17.2 |
| 66 | Ibrahim Geagea (LIB) | 164.3* | 104.8 | 274.1 | +2:23.8 |
| – | Zdeněk Parma (TCH) | | | | DNF |
| – | Åke Nilsson (SWE) | | | | DNF |
| – | Karl Gamma (SUI) | | | | DNF |
| – | Roberto Lacedelli (ITA) | | | | DNF |
| – | Jan Lipowski (POL) | | | | DNF |
| – | Jan Gąsienica Ciaptak (POL) | | | | DNF |
| – | Jaime Errázuriz (CHI) | | | | DNF |
| – | Hans Hinterholzer (AUT) | | | | DNF |
| – | Christian Pravda (AUT) | | | | DQ |
| – | György Libik (HUN) | | | | DQ |
| – | Radu Scîrneci (ROU) | | | | DQ |

* 5 seconds penalty added. ** 10 seconds penalty added.
