= FIS Alpine World Ski Championships 1950 =

Skiing event in Aspen, Colorado, USA

Coordinates: 39.186°N 106.819°W

- Host city: Aspen, Colorado
- Country: United States
- Nations: 14
- Athletes: 108
- Events: 6
- Opening: February 13, 1950
- Closing: February 18, 1950
- Opened by: Harry S. Truman
- Main venue: Ajax Mountain

Location in the United States
Location in Colorado

The FIS Alpine World Ski Championships 1950 were the 11th FIS Alpine World Ski Championships, held February 13–18 in the United States at Aspen, Colorado.

These were the first world championships held outside of Europe, and the first official world championships not concurrent with the Olympics since 1939. The Giant slalom made its world championships debut and displaced the combined event, which returned to the program in 1954 as a "paper race," using the results of the three races (downhill, giant slalom, and slalom) through 1980.

At Aspen's Ajax Mountain, Zeno Colò of Italy won the downhill and giant slalom, and just missed a sweep of the gold medals; he finished 0.3 seconds behind in the slalom, taking the silver. Austria dominated the women's races: Dagmar Rom won the giant slalom and slalom, Trude Jochum-Beiser won gold in the downhill and silver in the GS, and Erika Mahringer took two silver medals, in the downhill and slalom.

Aspen was in its fourth year as a ski area; it opened in December 1946 with a single chairlift.

The Nordic world championships were also held in the U.S. in 1950, at Lake Placid, New York. Due to a lack of snow at Lake Placid, the cross-country events were moved to Rumford, Maine.

== Men's competitions ==
=== Downhill ===
Saturday, February 18, 1950

In the final race of the championships, Colò descended the 2.1-mile (3.4 km) course
at an average speed of 53 mph (85 km/h) to win his second gold medal and third podium.

Place	Name	Country	Time	Diff.
1st place, gold medalist(s)	Zeno Colò	Italy (ITA)	2:34.4	−
2nd place, silver medalist(s)	James Couttet	France (FRA)	2:35.7	+ 1.3
3rd place, bronze medalist(s)	Egon Schöpf	Austria (AUT)	2:36.3	+ 1.9
4	Bernhard Perren	Switzerland (SUI)	2:37.7	+ 3.3
5	Christian Pravda	Austria (AUT)	2:38.1	+ 3.7
6	Jean Pazzi	France (FRA)	2:38.6	+ 4.2
7	Edi Mall	Austria (AUT)	2:38.9	+ 4.5
8	Hans Nogler	Austria (AUT)	2:39.5	+ 5.1
9	Rolf Olinger	Switzerland (SUI)	2:39.7	+ 5.3
10	Edy Rominger	Switzerland (SUI)	2:40.3	+ 5.9
11	Franz Gabl	Austria (AUT)	2:41.1	+ 6.7
12	Hans Senger	Austria (AUT)	2:41.5	+ 7.1

=== Giant slalom ===
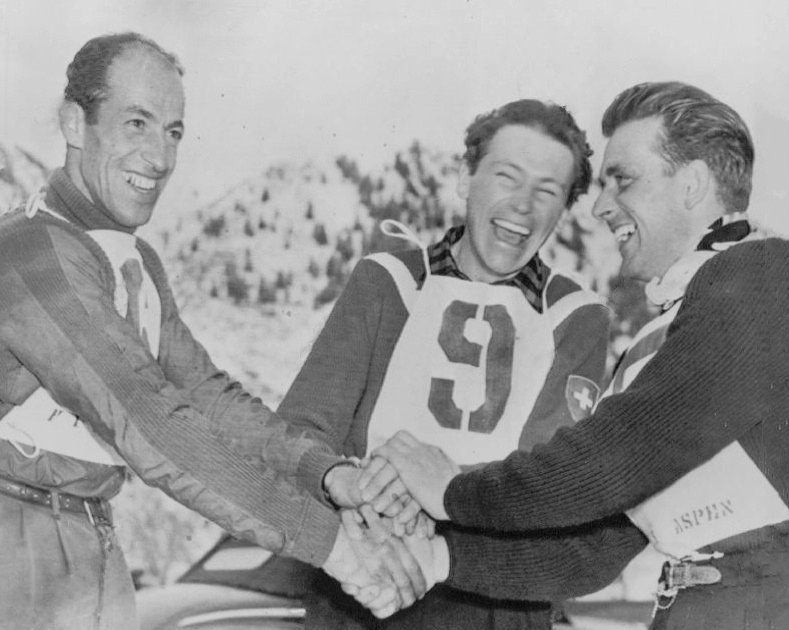
Left-right: Zeno Colò, Fernand Grosjean and James Couttet after the giant slalom competition

Tuesday, February 14, 1950

In the first men's race, Colò averaged 40 mph (64 km/h) in the one-run event.
The course had 35 gates with a vertical drop of 1,600 feet (490 m).

Place	Name	Country	Time	Diff.
1st place, gold medalist(s)	Zeno Colò	Italy (ITA)	1:54.4	−
2nd place, silver medalist(s)	Fernand Grosjean	Switzerland (SUI)	1:55.2	+ 0.8
3rd place, bronze medalist(s)	James Couttet	France (FRA)	1:55.3	+ 0.9
4	Henri Oreiller	France (FRA)	1:55.8	+ 1.4
5	Georges Schneider	Switzerland (SUI)	1:55.9	+ 1.5
6	Carlo Gartner	Italy (ITA)	1:56.0	+ 1.6
7	George Panisset	France (FRA)	1:56.3	+ 1.9
8	Guttorm Berge	Norway (NOR)	1:56.5	+ 2.1
9	Silvio Alverà	Italy (ITA)	1:56.8	+ 2.4
10	Jean Pazzi	France (FRA)	1:57.0	+ 2.6

=== Slalom ===
Thursday, February 16, 1950

Georges Schneider edged Colò by three-tenths of a second over two runs.
The 1,000-yard (910 m) course of 40 gates had a vertical drop of 700 feet (210 m).

Place	Name	Country	Time	Diff.
1st place, gold medalist(s)	Georges Schneider	Switzerland (SUI)	2:06.4	−
2nd place, silver medalist(s)	Zeno Colò	Italy (ITA)	2:06.7	+ 0.3
3rd place, bronze medalist(s)	Stein Eriksen	Norway (NOR)	2:08.0	+ 1.6
4	Jack Reddish	United States (USA)	2:08.4	+ 2.0
=5	Egon Schöpf	Austria (AUT)	2:09.0	+ 2.6
=5	Ernest McCullough	Canada (CAN)	2:09.0	+ 2.6
=5	James Couttet	France (FRA)	2:09.0	+ 2.6

== Women's competitions ==
=== Downhill ===
Friday, February 17, 1950

Trude Jochum-Beiser, 22, won the final women's event, averaging nearly 50 mph (80 km/h).
She had given birth to her first child just four months earlier.

Place	Nation	Athlete	Time	Diff.
1st place, gold medalist(s)	Austria (AUT)	Trude Jochum-Beiser	2:06.6	−
2nd place, silver medalist(s)	Austria (AUT)	Erika Mahringer	2:07.5	+ 0.9
3rd place, bronze medalist(s)	France (FRA)	Georgette Miller-Thiollière	2:08.4	+ 1.8
4	Austria (AUT)	Anneliese Schuh-Proxauf	2:08.6	+ 2.0
5	United States (USA)	Katy Rodolph	2:08.9	+ 2.3
6	France (FRA)	Lucienne Schmith-Couttet	2:10.0	+ 3.4

=== Giant slalom ===
Monday, February 13, 1950

In the first race of the championships, Rom averaged 30 mph (48 km/h) in the one-run event.
The course had 28 gates with an approximate vertical drop of 1,000 feet (300 m).

Place	Nation	Athlete	Time	Diff.
1st place, gold medalist(s)	Austria (AUT)	Dagmar Rom	1:29.6	−
2nd place, silver medalist(s)	Austria (AUT)	Trude Jochum-Beiser	1:29.8	+ 0.2
3rd place, bronze medalist(s)	France (FRA)	Lucienne Schmith-Couttet	1:30.0	+ 0.4
4	Austria (AUT)	Erika Mahringer	1:31.8	+ 2.2
5	Austria (AUT)	Anneliese Schuh-Proxauf	1:31.9	+ 2.3
6	Austria (AUT)	Lydia Gstrein	1:32.7	+ 3.1
7	Austria (AUT)	Resi Hammerer	1:33.1	+ 3.5
8	United States (USA)	Katy Rodolph	1:33.4	+ 3.8
9	United States (USA)	Andrea Mead	1:33.5	+ 3.9
10	France (FRA)	Micheline Desmazières	1:33.8	+ 4.2
11	Sweden (SWE)	Sarah Thomasson	1:34.1	+ 4.5
12	Italy (ITA)	Celina Seghi	1:34.3	+ 4.7
13	United States (USA)	Suzy Harris-Rytting	1:36.2	+ 6.6
14	Switzerland (SUI)	Olivia Ausoni	1:36.3	+ 6.7
15	France (FRA)	Georgette Miller-Thiollière	1:36.9	+ 7.3

=== Slalom ===
Wednesday, February 15, 1950

Rom, 21, won her second gold medal in as many events by the slimmest of margins over two runs.
The quarter-mile (400 m) course of 33 gates had a vertical drop of 495 feet (150 m).

Place	Nation	Athlete	Time	Diff.
1st place, gold medalist(s)	Austria (AUT)	Dagmar Rom	1:47.8	−
2nd place, silver medalist(s)	Austria (AUT)	Erika Mahringer	1:47.9	+ 0.1
3rd place, bronze medalist(s)	Italy (ITA)	Celina Seghi	1:49.5	+ 1.7
4	Austria (AUT)	Anneliese Schuh-Proxauf	1:49.9	+ 2.1
5	France (FRA)	Lucienne Schmith-Couttet	1:51.0	+ 3.2
6	United States (USA)	Andrea Mead	1:51.7	+ 3.9

== Medal standings ==
Place	Nation	Gold	Silver	Bronze	Total
1	Austria (AUT)	3	3	1	7
2	Italy (ITA)	2	1	1	4
3	Switzerland (SUI)	1	1	–	2
4	France (FRA)	–	1	3	4
5	Norway (NOR)	–	–	1	1

== Video ==
- Vimeo.com – 1950 World Championships
- Vimeo.com – (1950) Aspen FIS race coverage
