= Poland at the 1948 Winter Olympics =

- IOC code: POL
- NOC: Polish Olympic Committee
- Website: www.pkol.pl (in Polish)

in St. Moritz
- Competitors: 29 (men) in 5 sports
- Flag bearer: Stanisław Marusarz
- Medals: Gold 0 Silver 0 Bronze 0 Total 0

Winter Olympics appearances (overview)
- 1924; 1928; 1932; 1936; 1948; 1952; 1956; 1960; 1964; 1968; 1972; 1976; 1980; 1984; 1988; 1992; 1994; 1998; 2002; 2006; 2010; 2014; 2018; 2022; 2026

Poland competed at the 1948 Winter Olympics in St. Moritz, Switzerland.

== Alpine skiing ==
Men

Athlete	Event	Race 1		Race 2		Total	
Athlete	Event	Time	Rank	Time	Rank	Time	Rank
Jan Pawlica	Downhill					DNF	–
Jerzy Schindler	Downhill					3:49.4	67
Jan Gąsienica Ciaptak	Downhill					3:21.3	37
Józef Marusarz	Downhill					3:20.2	35
Jan Gąsienica Ciaptak	Slalom	DNF	–	–	–	DNF	–
Jan Lipowski	Slalom	DNF	–	–	–	DNF	–
Józef Marusarz	Slalom	1:19.2	27	1:14.0	31	2:33.2	31

Men's combined

The downhill part of this event was held along with the main medal event of downhill skiing. For athletes competing in both events, the same time was used (see table above for the results). The slalom part of the event was held separate from the main medal event of slalom skiing (included in table below).

Athlete	Slalom			Total (downhill + slalom)	
Athlete	Time 1	Time 2	Rank	Points	Rank
Jerzy Schindler	–	–	–	DNF	–
Jan Gąsienica Ciaptak	1:25.0	1:27.2 (+0:05)	38	31.12	31
Józef Marusarz	1:23.2	1:18.8	29	25.96	27

== Cross-country skiing ==
Men

Event	Athlete	Race	
Event	Athlete	Time	Rank
18 km	Leopold Tajner	1'38:45	76
18 km	Stanisław Bukowski	1'34:17	70
18 km	Józef Daniel Krzeptowski	1'31:05	62
18 km	Tadeusz Kwapień	1'27:55	47
18 km	Stefan Dziedzic	1'25:33	38

Men's 4 x 10 km relay

Athletes	Race	
Athletes	Time	Rank
Józef Daniel Krzeptowski; Stanisław Bukowski; Tadeusz Kwapień; Stefan Dziedzic	2'59:19	10

== Ice hockey ==
The tournament was run in a round-robin format with nine teams participating.

	Pld	W	L	T	GF	GA	Pts
Canada	8	7	0	1	69	5	15
Czechoslovakia	8	7	0	1	80	18	15
Switzerland	8	6	2	0	67	21	12
Sweden	8	4	4	0	55	28	8
Great Britain	8	3	5	0	39	47	6
Poland 6th	8	2	6	0	29	97	4
Austria	8	1	7	0	33	77	2
Italy	8	0	8	0	24	156	0
United States *	8	5	3	0	86	33	10

* United States team was disqualified. Only eight teams are officially ranked.

- Poland 7-5 Austria
- USA 23-4 Poland
- Czechoslovakia 13-2 Poland
- Canada 15-0 Poland
- Poland 13-7 Italy
- United Kingdom 7-2 Poland
- Switzerland 14-0 Poland
- Sweden 13-2 Poland

Contestants; Henryk Bromowicz; Mieczysław Burda; Stefan Csorich; Zygmunt Ginter; Alfred Gansiniec; Tomasz Jasiński; Mieczysław Kasprzycki; Bolesław Kolasa; Adam Kowalski; Eugeniusz Lewacki; Jan Maciejko; Czesław Marchewczyk; Mieczysław Palus; Henryk Przeździecki; Hilary Skarżyński; Maksymilian Więcek; Ernest Ziaja

== Nordic combined ==
Events:

- 18 km cross-country skiing
- normal hill ski jumping

The cross-country skiing part of this event was combined with the main medal event, meaning that athletes competing here were skiing for disciplines two at the same time. Details can be found above in this article, in the cross-country skiing section.

The ski jumping (normal hill) event was held separate from the main medal event of ski jumping, results can be found in the table below. Athletes would perform three jumps, of which the two best jumps (distance and form) were counted.

Athlete	Event	Cross-country		Ski Jumping					Total	
Athlete	Event	Points	Rank	Distance 1	Distance 2	Distance 3	Points	Rank	Points	Rank
Leopold Tajner	Individual	126.00	35	61.5	58.0	55.0	195.5	20	321.50	34
Józef Daniel Krzeptowski	Individual	162.00	26	58.0	57.0	60.5	197.8	18	359.80	22
Tadeusz Kwapień	Individual	178.50	21	47.0	52.5	51.0	173.7	34	352.20	25
Stefan Dziedzic	Individual	190.50	18	52.0	54.5	52.0	177.1	31	367.20	20

== Ski jumping ==
Athlete	Event	Distance 1	Distance 2	Total points	Rank
Jan Kula	Normal hill	49.0	59.0	184.5	33
Jan Gąsienica Ciaptak	Normal hill	53.0	61.0	180.8	36
Jozef Daniel Krzeptowski	Normal hill	54.5	55.0	188.9	30
Stanisław Marusarz	Normal hill	59.0	59.0	192.8	27
