= Bill Irwin (skier) =

Canadian skier (1920–2013)

William Archibald Irwin
- Born: March 24, 1920
- Died: February 9, 2013 (aged 92)
- Known for: competitive skiIing

William Archibald Irwin (March 24, 1920 – February 9, 2013) was a Canadian competitive skier who competed in six events across four disciplines at the 1948 Winter Olympics. In St. Moritz he competed in the downhill, slalom, combined, 18 km, Nordic combined, and ski jumping events, placing 60th (tied with Donald Garrow of Great Britain), 50th, 36th, 81st, 37th, and 39th respectively. Born in Winnipeg, Manitoba, he won his first race at the age of nine in 1930 and his last in 1983. He served with the Canadian Army during World War II from 1943 through 1945 and taught Scottish Commandos how to ski after the conflict.

In 1956, he founded a ski area and club at Loch Lomond near Thunder Bay, Ontario, owning and operating it for 23 years. In 1975, he was awarded the Ontario Tourism Award for "...dedication to the tourist industry of Ontario through the development and promotion of skiing" and in 2000, he was inducted into the Canadian Ski Hall of Fame in the jumping, Nordic, and builder categories.

Over the course of his career as a competitor, he acquired more than 200 trophies at both the national and international levels and won numerous Central Canadian championships. His brother Bert also competed at the 1948 Games and his son Dave attended the 1976 and 1980 Winter Olympics, becoming known nationally as one of the "Crazy Canucks".
