= Zeno Colò =

Italian alpine skier (1920–1993)

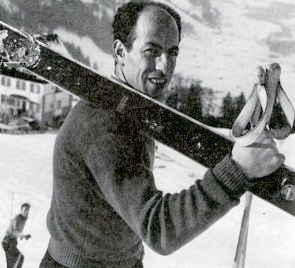
- Colò in the early 1950s

Personal information
- Born: 30 June 1920 Abetone, Tuscany, Italy
- Died: 12 May 1993 (aged 72) San Marcello Pistoiese, Tuscany, Italy

Skiing career
- Sport: Alpine skiing
- Retired: 1954 (age 33)
- Disciplines: Downhill, giant slalom, slalom, combined

Olympics
- Teams: 2 – (1948, 1952)
- Medals: 1 (1 gold)

World Championships
- Teams: 3 – (1948, 1950, 1952) includes two Olympics
- Medals: 4 (3 gold)
Medal record
Men's alpine skiing
Representing Italy
Olympic Games
Gold medal – first place	1952 Oslo	Downhill
World Championships
Gold medal – first place	1950 Aspen	Downhill
Gold medal – first place	1950 Aspen	Giant slalom
Silver medal – second place	1950 Aspen	Slalom
Gold medal – first place	1952 Oslo	Downhill

Zeno Colò (30 June 1920 – 12 May 1993) was a champion alpine ski racer from Italy. Born in La Consuma (Abetone), Tuscany, he was among the top ski racers of the late 1940s and early 1950s.

== Career ==
At the World Championships in 1950 in Aspen, he won gold medals in both downhill and giant slalom, and the silver in slalom. Two years later, at the 1952 Olympics in Oslo, he won gold in the downhill, and finished fourth in the giant slalom and slalom. Italy waited two decades for its next Olympic gold in alpine skiing, Gustav Thöni's win in giant slalom in 1972.

Colò won the Lauberhorn downhill in Wengen in 1948, and took the slalom title there in 1949 and 1950. Following his near-sweep at Aspen in 1950, he also won all three North American titles in downhill, slalom, and combined the following week in Canada at Mt Norquay near Banff, Alberta. At the 1948 Olympics in St. Moritz, Colò finished 14th in the slalom, but did not finish in the downhill, which also eliminated him from the combined. He set a speed world record on skis in 1947, clocked at 98.7 mph (158.8 km/h) on the Italian side of the Little Matterhorn. which stood for 13 years.

After the 1952 Olympics, Colò linked his name to a line of ski clothing and, according to the regulations of the time, he was considered a professional. In 1954, he was disqualified by the Italian Winter Sports Federation (FISI) and was not allowed to participate in subsequent races, notably the 1954 World Championships in Åre, and he retired at age 33. The ban was lifted 35 years later in 1989.

Colò became a ski instructor in his native Abetone, helped develop the Pistoia ski resort, and promoted the Abetone Ski Company. In 1973, he designed three ski slopes that descend from the Gomito mountain, named Zeno 1, 2, and 3.

Colò died in 1993 from lung cancer at age 72 in San Marcello Pistoiese in Tuscany. The asteroid 58709 Zenocolò, discovered in 1998, was named in his honor.

== World championship results ==
Year	Age	Slalom	Giant Slalom	Super-G	Downhill	Combined
1948	27	14	not run	not run	DNF	DNF DH
1950	29	2	1	not run	1	not run
1952	31	4	4	not run	1	not run

From 1948 through 1980, the Winter Olympics were also the World Championships for alpine skiing.

== Olympic results ==
Year	Age	Slalom	Giant Slalom	Super-G	Downhill	Combined
1948	27	14	not run	not run	DNF	DNF DH
1952	31	4	4	not run	1	not run

== See also ==
- Legends of Italian sport - Walk of Fame
- Italy at the Olympics - gold medalists
- List of Olympic medalists in alpine skiing
- List of Alpine Skiing world champions
- Italy national alpine ski at the World championships
