= Fernand Grosjean =

Swiss alpine skier (1924–2015)

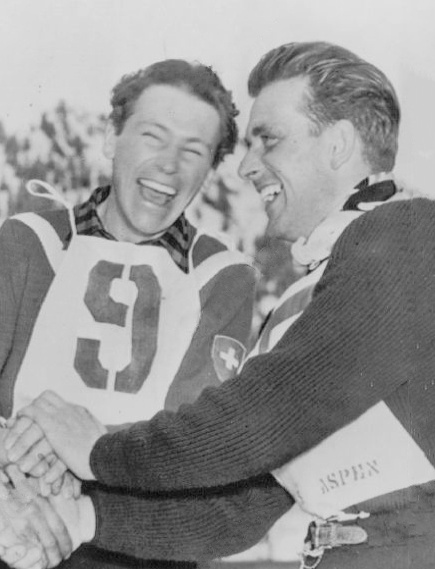
- Grosjean (left) at the 1950 World Championships

Personal information
- Born: 5 May 1924 Geneva, Switzerland
- Died: 19 August 2015 (aged 91)

Sport
- Sport: Alpine skiing
Medal record
Representing Switzerland
World Championships
Silver medal – second place	1950 Colorado	Giant slalom

Fernand Grosjean (5 May 1924 – 19 August 2015) was a Swiss alpine skier who competed at the 1948 and at the 1952 Winter Olympics. In 1948 he finished eighth in the alpine skiing downhill competition and 16th in the combined event. Four years later he finished eleventh in the 1952 giant slalom competition. Grosjean won a silver medal in the giant slalom at the 1950 World Championships.

Grosjean's grandson is racing driver Romain Grosjean.
