= Stein Eriksen =

Norwegian alpine skier (1927–2015)

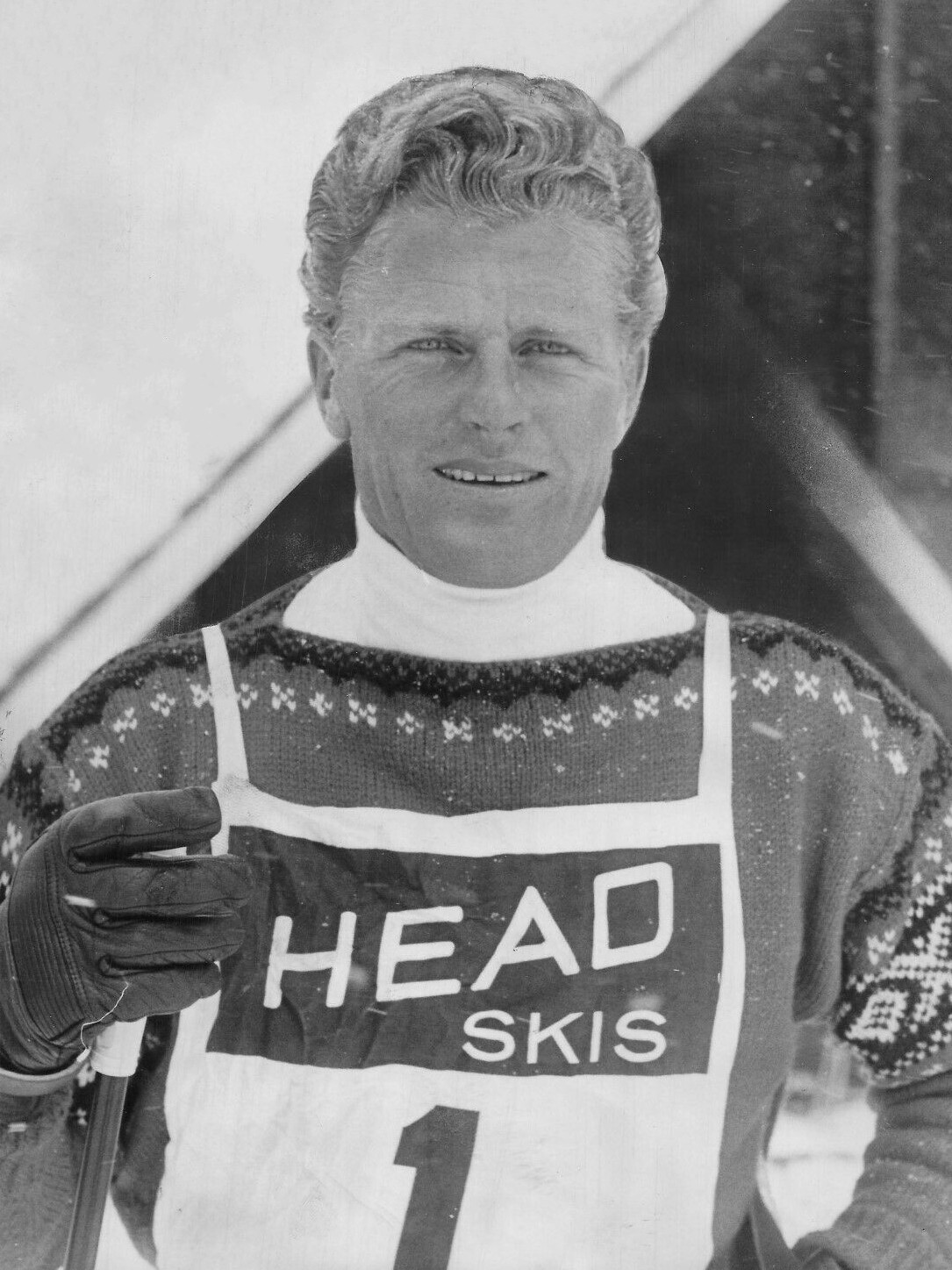
- Eriksen in 1961

Personal information
- Born: 11 December 1927 Oslo, Norway
- Died: 27 December 2015 (aged 88) Park City, Utah, U.S.

Skiing career
- Sport: Alpine skiing
- Retired: 1954 (age 26)
- Disciplines: Downhill, giant slalom, slalom, combined

Olympics
- Teams: 2 – (1948, 1952)
- Medals: 2 (1 gold)

World Championships
- Teams: 4 – (1948, 1950, 1952, 1954) includes Olympics
- Medals: 6 (4 gold)
Medal record
Representing Norway
Olympic Games
Gold medal – first place	1952 Oslo	Giant slalom
Silver medal – second place	1952 Oslo	Slalom
World Championships
Gold medal – first place	1954 Åre	Slalom
Gold medal – first place	1954 Åre	Giant slalom
Gold medal – first place	1954 Åre	Combined
Bronze medal – third place	1950 Aspen	Slalom

Stein Eriksen (11 December 1927 – 27 December 2015) was an alpine ski racer and Olympic gold medalist from Norway. Following his racing career, he was a ski school director and ambassador at various resorts in the United States.

== Background ==
Eriksen was born 11 December 1927, in Oslo. His parents were Marius Eriksen (1886–1950) and Birgit Heien (1900–1996). Marius Eriksen competed in the 1912 Olympic Games as a gymnast. His brother, Marius Eriksen, Jr. (1922–2009), was an alpine skier and during World War II became a fighter ace in the Royal Norwegian Air Force. Stein Eriksen was the top slalom racer in Norway in 1949 and took bronze in the slalom at the 1950 World Championships in Aspen, Colorado.

== Sports career ==
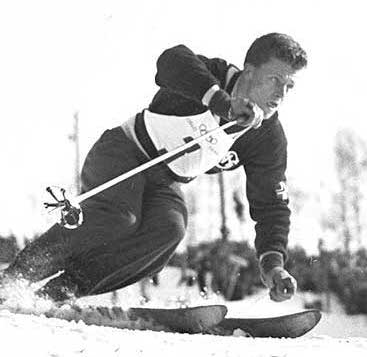
Eriksen at the 1952 Olympics

Eriksen won the gold medal in the giant slalom at the 1952 Winter Olympics, which was held in Oslo, Norway. He also won a silver medal in the slalom. Eriksen was the first male alpine ski racer from outside the Alps to win an Olympic gold medal. He also won three gold medals at the 1954 World Championships in Åre, Sweden.

Other accomplishments included being credited with devising "aerials", a freestyle skiing event, and helping revolutionize the world of alpine skiing in the United States, where he served as a ski instructor at many different ski schools. At Sugarbush Resort in Vermont, each Sunday afternoon, combining his gymnastics background and his skiing, Stein would demonstrate a flip on skis. For his Olympic medals, Eriksen earned the Holmenkollen Medal in 1952.

It is said that Eriksen was skiing's "first superstar", since he was handsome, stylish and charismatic. Despite his fame, he maintained a very down-to-Earth personality. For example, he is quoted as saying, "Be tough, be confident. But you will never be a whole and happy person if you aren't humble".

== Life in the United States ==
Shortly after his success in the 1952 Olympics, Eriksen moved to the United States where he lived until his death. While ski racing for Norway, he was a ski instructor at Sun Valley in Idaho. Following his racing career, he was the ski school director at various resorts, such as Boyne Mountain and Pine Knob, both in Michigan, Sugarbush in Vermont, Heavenly Valley in California, Snowmass and Aspen in Colorado, and Park City in Utah. At the time of his death he was the director of skiing at the Deer Valley Resort in Utah, and also served as host of the Stein Eriksen Lodge, a ski lodge in Deer Valley (not owned by Eriksen, but named in his honor). Eriksen was married to Garvene Eriksen, Gerrysue Eriksen then to Françoise Eriksen. He had five children: Ava, Stein Jr., Anja, Julianna Eriksen, and Bjørn. He called both Utah and Montana home.

In 1997, Eriksen was honored by the King of Norway. He was knighted with the Royal Norwegian Order of Merit for his contribution to Norway, the highest honor that the Norwegian government can give to people living outside Norway.

Eriksen celebrated his 80th birthday December 2007 in Deer Valley. He died on 27 December 2015, sixteen days after his 88th birthday, in his Park City, Utah home.

== Major championship results ==
Championship	Age	Slalom	Giant Slalom	Super-G	Downhill	Combined
1948 Olympics	20	29	not run	not run	31	46
1950 Worlds	22	3	-	not run	DNF	not run
1952 Olympics	24	2	1	not run	6	not run
1954 Worlds	26	1	1	not run	8	1

From 1948 through 1980, the Winter Olympics were also the World Championships for alpine skiing.

Awards
Preceded by Sverre Strandli	Norwegian Sportsperson of the Year; 1951	Succeeded by Hjalmar Andersen
Preceded by Sverre Strandli	Norwegian Sportsperson of the Year; 1954	Succeeded by Audun Boysen
