= Hans Hansson (skier) =

Swedish alpine skier (1919–2003)

Hans Hansson (30 May 1919 – 14 November 2003) was a Swedish alpine skier who competed in the 1948 Winter Olympics.

In 1948 he finished sixth in the combined event, tenth in the downhill competition, and eleventh in the slalom event.
