= Julio Cernuda =

Argentine alpine skier (1920–1999)

Personal information
- Nationality: Argentine
- Born: 24 September 1920
- Died: 25 September 1999 (aged 79)

Sport
- Sport: Alpine skiing

Julio Cernuda (24 September 1920 – 25 September 1999) was an Argentine alpine skier. He competed in the men's downhill at the 1948 Winter Olympics.
