= Richard Movitz =

American alpine skier (1925–2010)

Personal information
- Nationality: American
- Born: December 10, 1925 Salt Lake City, Utah, United States
- Died: May 13, 2010 (aged 84) Salt Lake City, Utah, United States

Sport
- Sport: Alpine skiing

Richard Movitz (December 10, 1925 – May 13, 2010) was an American alpine skier. He competed in the men's downhill at the 1948 Winter Olympics.
