= Spain at the 1948 Winter Olympics =

- IOC code: ESP
- NOC: Spanish Olympic Committee
- Website: www.coe.es (in Spanish)

in St. Moritz
- Competitors: 6 (men) in 1 sport
- Flag bearer: José Arias
- Medals: Gold 0 Silver 0 Bronze 0 Total 0

Winter Olympics appearances (overview)
- 1936; 1948; 1952; 1956; 1960; 1964; 1968; 1972; 1976; 1980; 1984; 1988; 1992; 1994; 1998; 2002; 2006; 2010; 2014; 2018; 2022; 2026

Spain competed at the 1948 Winter Olympics in St. Moritz, Switzerland.

== Alpine skiing ==
Men

Athlete	Event	Race 1		Race 2		Total	
Athlete	Event	Time	Rank	Time	Rank	Time	Rank
Fernando Armiñán	Downhill					5:41.2	102
José Vilà	Downhill					5:13.0	100
Thomas de Morawitz	Downhill					4:24.0	89
José Arias	Downhill					4:11.4	86
Ramón Blanco	Slalom	2:18.5	62	2:09.0	66	4:27.5	65
Thomas de Morawitz	Slalom	1:37.0	47	1:30.8	53	3:07.8	51
José Arias	Slalom	1:31.4	43	1:24.5	49	2:55.9	45
Juan Poll	Slalom	1:30.9	42	1:25.0	51	2:55.9	45

Men's combined

The downhill part of this event was held along with the main medal event of downhill skiing. For athletes competing in both events, the same time was used (see table above for the results). The slalom part of the event was held separate from the main medal event of slalom skiing (included in table below).

Athlete	Slalom			Total (downhill + slalom)	
Athlete	Time 1	Time 2	Rank	Points	Rank
Fernando Armiñán	–	–	–	DNF	–
José Vilà	–	–	–	DNF	–
Thomas de Morawitz	1:44.4	1:24.8	52	73.06	59
José Arias	1:42.6	1:24.5 (+0:05)	48	65.40	54
