= Bela Imre =

Romanian alpine skier (1920–2001)

Personal information
- Nationality: Romanian
- Born: 27 January 1920; Brașov, Romania
- Died: 5 July 2001 (aged 81); Traunreut, Germany

Sport
- Sport: Alpine skiing

Bela Imre (27 January 1920 – 5 July 2001) was a Romanian alpine skier. He competed in the men's slalom at the 1948 Winter Olympics.
