= Kolasa =

Kolasa is a surname. Notable people with the surname include:

- Adam Kolasa (born 1975), Polish pole vaulter
- Bolesław Kolasa (1920–2007), Polish ice hockey player
- Marian Kolasa (born 1959), Polish pole vaulter
