= Eugenio Bonicco =

Italian alpine skier (1919–1987)

Personal information
- Nationality: Italian
- Born: 30 August 1919; Frabosa Soprana, Italy
- Died: 6 November 1987 (aged 68); Frabosa Soprana, Italy

Sport
- Sport: Alpine skiing

Eugenio Bonicco (30 August 1919 – 6 November 1987) was an Italian alpine skier. He competed in the men's downhill at the 1948 Winter Olympics.
