= Alfred Stäger =

Swiss alpine skier (1924–2006)

Personal information
- Nationality: Swiss
- Born: 5 October 1924
- Died: 19 June 2006 (aged 81) Le Landeron, Switzerland

Sport
- Sport: Alpine skiing

Alfred Stäger (5 October 1924 – 19 June 2006) was a Swiss alpine skier. He competed in the men's downhill at the 1948 Winter Olympics. Stäger died in Le Landeron on 19 June 2006, at the age of 81.
