= Sándor Mazány =

Hungarian alpine skier (1923–2012)

Personal information
- Nationality: Hungarian
- Born: 16 March 1923; Budapest, Hungary
- Died: 20 October 2012 (aged 89); Auckland, New Zealand

Sport
- Sport: Alpine skiing

Sándor Mazány (16 March 1923 – 20 October 2012) was a Hungarian alpine skier. He competed in the men's downhill at the 1948 Winter Olympics.
