= Zdeněk Parma =

Czech alpine skier (1925–2006)

Personal information
- Nationality: Czech
- Born: 30 March 1925; Frenštát pod Radhoštěm, Czechoslovakia
- Died: 15 June 2006 (aged 81)

Sport
- Sport: Alpine skiing

Zdeněk Parma (30 March 1925 – 15 June 2006) was a Czech alpine skier. He competed in the men's slalom at the 1948 Winter Olympics.
