= Jack Reddish =

American alpine skier

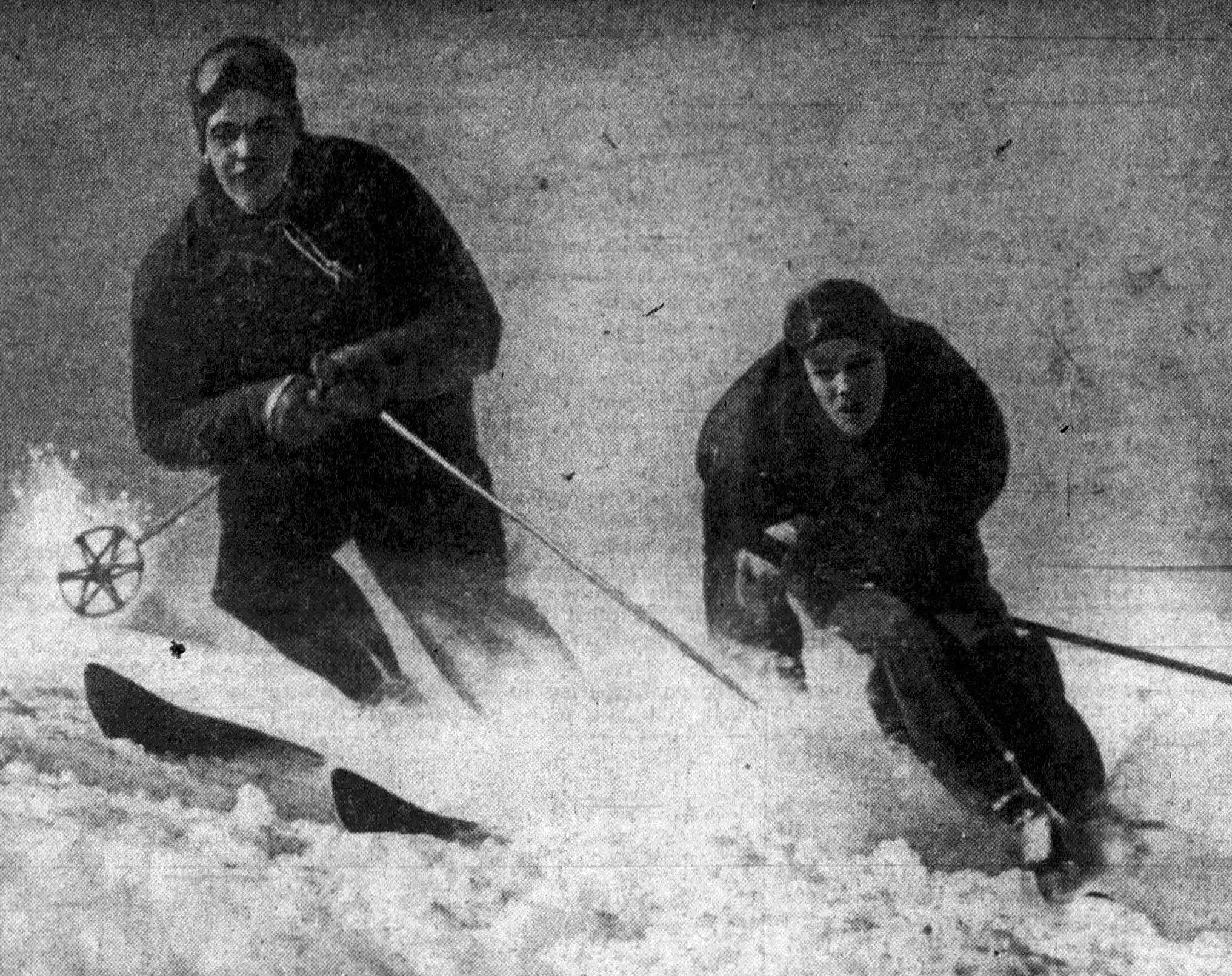
- Darrell Robison (left) and Reddish, circa 1951

Personal information
- Born: December 2, 1926 Salt Lake City, Utah, U.S.
- Died: October 20, 1992 (aged 65) Salt Lake City, Utah, U.S.
- Height: 5 ft 9 in (175 cm)

Skiing career
- Sport: Alpine skiing
- Club: Alta Ski Club, post-Olympic: Sun Valley SC
- Retired: 1952 (age 25)
- Disciplines: Downhill, giant slalom, slalom, combined

Olympics
- Teams: 2 – (1948, 1952)
- Medals: 0

World Championships
- Teams: 3 – (1948, 1950, 1952) includes Olympics
- Medals: 0

Jack Nichol Reddish (December 2, 1926 – October 20, 1992) was an American alpine ski racer who competed in the Winter Olympics in 1948 and 1952. Known as "Red Dog" during his racing days, he later worked in the entertainment industry, behind the cameras in film and television.

== Ski racing ==
Born and raised in Salt Lake City, Utah, Reddish grew up skiing and jumping at nearby Alta, attended Granite High School, and later the University of Utah. He was one of the top alpine racers from North America in the late 1940s and early 1950s, won multiple national titles, and was a three-time winner of the Snow Cup at Alta.

=== Olympics ===
At the 1948 Winter Olympics in St. Moritz, Switzerland, he raced in all three events and finished seventh in the slalom, twelfth in the combined, and 26th in the downhill. Four years later in Norway, he was captain of the U.S. men's team and finished 14th in the downhill, 17th in the slalom, and 24th in the giant slalom. In between, he also competed for the U.S. at the World Championships in 1950, held at Aspen, Colorado, where he finished fourth in the slalom.

Reddish served in the U.S. Navy during World War II and Korean War and was inducted into the National Ski Hall of Fame in 1969.

== After ski racing ==
Following his ski racing career, Reddish went into the film and television business, directing and producing well-known movies and TV shows. He was the assistant director for the 1963 movie The Great Escape. and produced Le Mans (1971). In television, he directed an episode of The Rat Patrol called "The Delilah Raid" (aired May 1, 1967).

== Personal ==
During his racing career, Reddish was a ski instructor at Alta, and afterward in 1952 at Sun Valley in Idaho, where he won the downhill in the Olympic trials in March 1947 and first won the Harriman Cup (and national title in downhill) in 1948. At age 27, he married 18-year-old Katherine Thalberg in April 1954 in Reno, Nevada. She was the daughter of actress Norma Shearer and late producer Irving Thalberg. The marriage was short-lived and Thalberg was later married to actor Richard Anderson from 1961 to 1973, then moved to Aspen and married Bill Stirling, who later became its mayor. She was a bookstore owner in Aspen and a noted political activist. Reddish was later married to Jane Fisher of Salt Lake City.

He died in Salt Lake City at age 65 in 1992.

== World Championship results ==
Year	Age	Slalom	Giant Slalom	Super G	Downhill	Combined
1948	21	7	not run	not run	26	12
1950	23	4	26	not run		not run
1952	25	17	24	not run	14	not run

- The Winter Olympics were also the World Championships for alpine skiing from 1948 through 1980

== Olympic results ==
Year	Age	Slalom	Giant Slalom	Super G	Downhill	Combined
1948	21	7	not run	not run	26	12
1952	25	17	24	not run	14	not run

== Video ==
- Jack Reddish – from Alf Engen Ski Museum on YouTube
