= Romedi Spada =

Swiss alpine skier (1925–2004)

Personal information
- Nationality: Swiss
- Born: 8 March 1925 St. Moritz, Switzerland
- Died: 30 July 2004 (aged 79)

Sport
- Sport: Alpine skiing

Romedi Spada (8 March 1925 – 30 July 2004) was a Swiss alpine skier. He competed in the men's downhill at the 1948 Winter Olympics.
