= Olle Dalman =

Swedish alpine skier (1922–2007)

Olle Dalman (23 June 1922 – 24 July 2007) was a Swedish alpine skier who competed in the 1948, 1952, and 1956 Winter Olympics.

He was born in Leksand, Sweden. In 1948 he finished fifth in the alpine skiing slalom event and 41st in the downhill competition. He also participated in the combined event but was eliminated in the slalom part.
