= Désiré Lacroix =

French alpine skier (1927–2013)

Personal information
- Full name: Désiré Félix Joseph Lacroix
- Nationality: French
- Born: 18 December 1927; Bois-d'Amont, France
- Died: 23 September 2013 (aged 85); Apt, France

Sport
- Sport: Alpine skiing

Désiré Lacroix (18 December 1927 – 23 September 2013) was a French alpine skier. He competed in the men's slalom at the 1948 Winter Olympics.
