= Dev Jennings =

Dev Jennings may refer to:

- Devereaux Jennings (1924–2000), American alpine skier
- Dev Jennings (cinematographer) (1884–1952), American cinematographer
