= Darrell Robison =

American alpine skier (1931–2002)

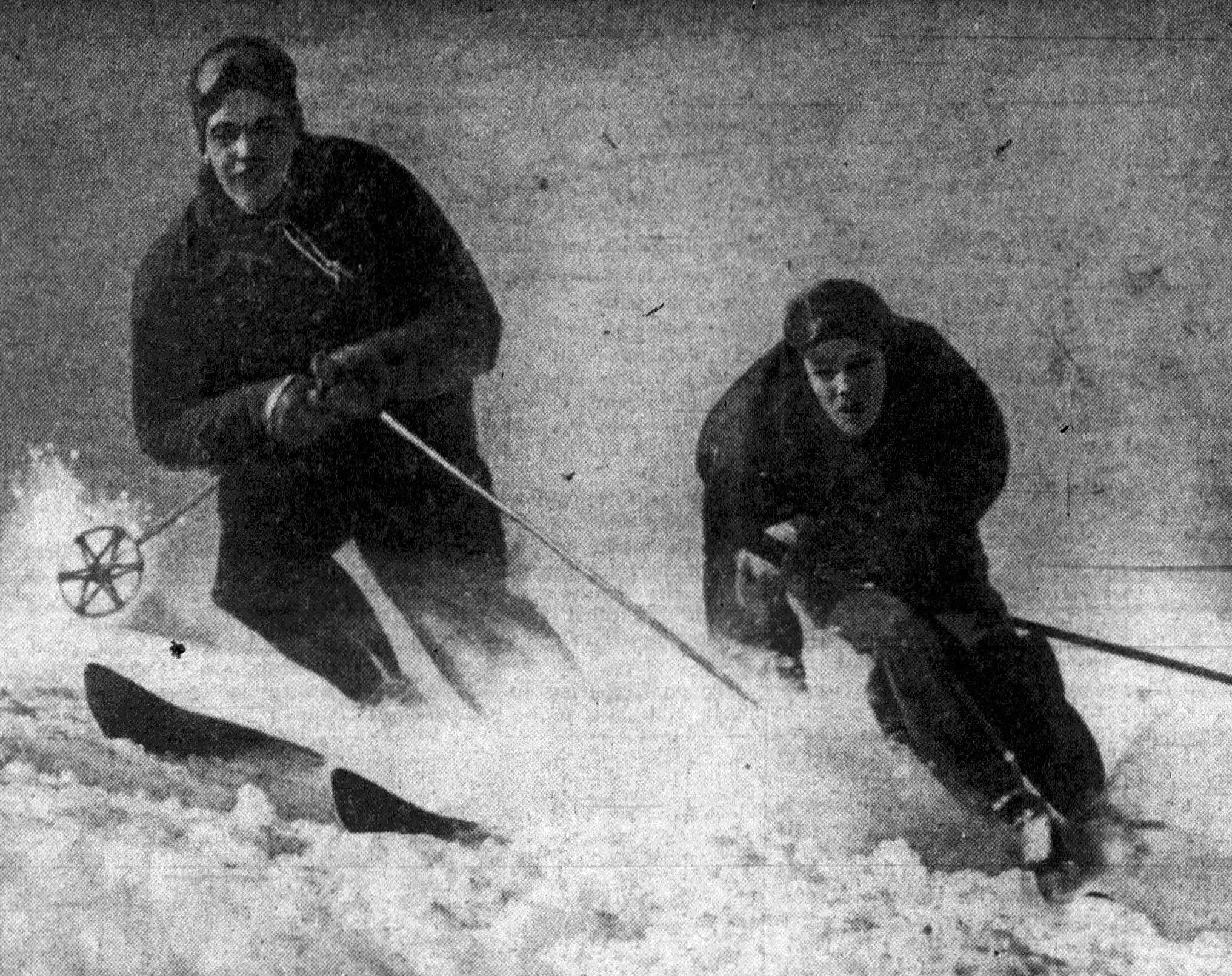
- Robinson (left) with Jack Reddish, circa 1951

Personal information
- Born: August 30, 1931 Reno, Nevada, United States
- Died: January 14, 2002 (aged 70) Salt Lake City, Utah, United States

Sport
- Sport: Alpine skiing

Darrell Robison (August 30, 1931 – January 14, 2002) was an American alpine ski racer; he competed in the slalom at the 1952 Winter Olympics in Norway.
