= Sverre Johannessen =

Norwegian alpine skier (1921–1993)

Sverre Johannessen (4 May 1921 – 21 September 1993) was a Norwegian alpine skier. He was born in Bærum, and represented the club Stabæk IF. He participated at the 1948 Winter Olympics in St. Moritz, and at the 1952 Winter Olympics in Oslo. His best placement was an eighteenth place in downhill at the 1948 Winter Olympics.

He became Norwegian champion in alpine combined 1947.
