= Vasile Ionescu =

Romanian alpine skier

Personal information
- Nationality: Romanian
- Born: 1 January 1922 Bușteni, Romania

Sport
- Sport: Alpine skiing

Vasile Ionescu (born 1 January 1922, date of death unknown) was a Romanian alpine skier. He competed in two events at the 1948 Winter Olympics.
