= Carlo Gartner =

Italian alpine skier (1922–2013)

Carlo Gartner (3 April 1922 – 10 June 2013) was an Italian alpine skier who competed in the 1948 Winter Olympics and in the 1952 Winter Olympics. He was born in Sterzing. In 1948 he finished sixth in the alpine skiing downhill competition. Four years later he finished eighth in the 1952 downhill event and 18th in the giant slalom competition.
