= Ramón Blanco (alpine skier) =

Spanish alpine skier (1925–2021)

Personal information
- Nationality: Spanish
- Born: 6 February 1925; Madrid, Spain
- Died: September 2021 (aged 96)

Sport
- Sport: Alpine skiing

Ramón Blanco (6 February 1925 – September 2021) was a Spanish alpine skier. He competed in the men's slalom at the 1948 Winter Olympics. Blanco died in September 2021, at the age of 96.
