= Greece at the 1948 Winter Olympics =

- IOC code: GRE
- NOC: Committee of the Olympic Games

in St. Moritz Switzerland
- Competitors: 1 (man) in 1 sport
- Flag bearer: Fotis Mavriplis
- Medals: Gold 0 Silver 0 Bronze 0 Total 0

Winter Olympics appearances (overview)
- 1936; 1948; 1952; 1956; 1960; 1964; 1968; 1972; 1976; 1980; 1984; 1988; 1992; 1994; 1998; 2002; 2006; 2010; 2014; 2018; 2022; 2026

Greece competed at the 1948 Winter Olympics in St. Moritz, Switzerland, which were held from 30 January to 8 February 1948. The country's participation in St. Moritz marked its second appearance at the Winter Olympics since its debut in 1936. The athlete delegation of the country was composed of one competitor, alpine skier Fotis Mavriplis. He would be designated as the flag bearer for the nation during the opening ceremony.

Mavriplis would first compete in the men's downhill event against 118 athletes. There, he would place 101st. He was also entered in the men's combined event which requires both a downhill and slalom time. He would not compete in the slalom and therefore is unplaced in the rankings of the event.

== Background ==
The 1948 Winter Olympics were held in St. Moritz, Switzerland, from 30 January to 8 February 1948. This edition marked the nation's second appearance at the Winter Olympics since its debut at the 1936 Winter Olympics in Garmisch-Partenkirchen, Germany. The nation had never won a medal at the Winter Olympics before these games. Alpine skier Fotis Mavriplis was designated as the flag bearer for the nation during the opening ceremony.

== Alpine skiing ==
The alpine skiing events were held in Corviglia. Mavriplis would first compete in the men's downhill event on 2 February against 118 athletes. There, he would record a time of 5:39.1 and placed 101st. He would also be entered to compete in the men's combined event which requires both a downhill and slalom time. He would not compete in the slalom and therefore is unplaced in the rankings of the event.

Alpine skiing summary
Athlete	Event	Run 1		Run 2		Total	
Athlete	Event	Time	Rank	Time	Rank	Time	Rank
Fotis Mavriplis	Men's combined	5:39.1	77	DNS		DNF	
Fotis Mavriplis	Men's downhill	5:39.1	101	—N/a		5:39.1	101
