= Jan Pawlica =

Polish alpine skier (1923–1972)

Personal information
- Nationality: Polish
- Born: 3 November 1923; Zakopane, Poland
- Died: 18 October 1972 (aged 48); Zakopane, Poland

Sport
- Sport: Alpine skiing

Jan Pawlica (3 November 1923 – 18 October 1972) was a Polish alpine skier. He competed in the men's downhill at the 1948 Winter Olympics.
