= Gonzalo Domínguez =

Chilean alpine skier (1925–2017)

Personal information
- Full name: Gonzalo Domínguez Vieytes
- Nationality: Chilean
- Born: 26 August 1925 Viña del Mar, Chile
- Died: 7 November 2017 (aged 92) Vitacura, Chile

Sport
- Sport: Alpine skiing

Gonzalo Domínguez Vieytes (26 August 1925 – 7 November 2017) was a Chilean alpine skier. He competed in two events at the 1948 Winter Olympics. Domínguez died in Vitacura on 7 November 2017, at the age of 92.
