= Silvio Alverà =

Italian alpine skier (1921–1985)

Silvio Alverà (December 17, 1921 – July 25, 1985) was an Italian alpine skier who competed in the 1948 Winter Olympics and in the 1952 Winter Olympics. He was born in Cortina d'Ampezzo.

In 1948 he finished fourth in the alpine skiing slalom competition, fifth in the combined event, and sixth in the downhill competition.
