= Eberhard Kneisl =

Austrian alpine skier (1916–2008)

Personal information
- Nationality: Austrian
- Born: 12 May 1916 Sölden, Austria
- Died: 26 December 2008 (aged 92)

Sport
- Sport: Alpine skiing

Eberhard Kneisl (12 May 1916 – 26 December 2008) was an Austrian alpine skier. He competed in two events at the 1948 Winter Olympics.
