= Magnús Brynjólfsson =

Icelandic alpine skier (1923–1976)

Personal information
- Nationality: Icelandic
- Born: 5 June 1923; Akureyri, Iceland
- Died: 6 December 1976 (aged 53); Akureyri, Iceland

Sport
- Sport: Alpine skiing

Magnús Brynjólfsson (5 June 1923 – 6 December 1976) was an Icelandic alpine skier. He competed in two events at the 1948 Winter Olympics.
