= Devereaux Jennings =

American alpine skier (1924–2000)

Personal information
- Born: June 28, 1924; Salt Lake City, Utah, United States
- Died: April 14, 2000 (aged 75); Waterville Valley, New Hampshire, United States

Sport
- Sport: Alpine skiing

H. Devereaux ("Dev") Jennings (June 28, 1924 – April 14, 2000) was an American alpine skier. Jennings competed in multiple events during his career, including the men's downhill at the 1948 Winter Olympics. He was involved in the 1960 Squaw Valley Winter Olympics, was Executive Director of Ski Utah, leading Utah's Olympic bid in the 1960s, and in the 1980s and 1990s became Executive Director of Ski New England. In 1989 he was inducted into the U.S. Ski Hall of Fame.
