= Jan Lipowski =

Polish alpine skier (1912–1996)

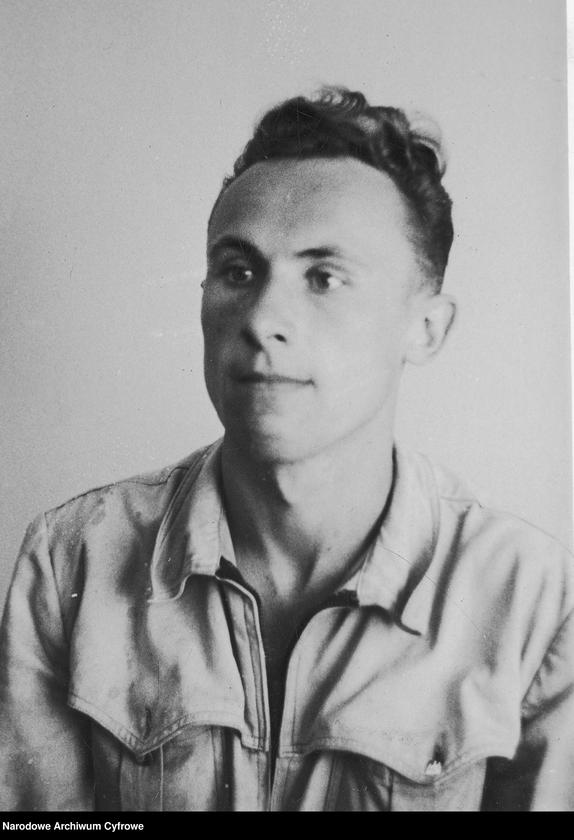
Jan Lipowski.jpg

Jan Lipowski (February 20, 1912 – April 5, 1996) was a Polish alpine skier who competed at the 1948 Winter Olympics in Saint Moritz, where he failed to finish in the men's slalom following a fall. He was born in Zakopane and graduated from the law school at Jagiellonian University. He was the Polish national champion in the special slalom in 1936, having finished second in the Nordic combined in 1935 and later placing runner-up in the downhill event in 1937. He served as an alpine skiing coach out of Wisła Zakopane following the Olympics.
