= Þórir Jónsson =

Icelandic alpine skier (1926–2017)

Personal information
- Nationality: Icelandic
- Born: 22 August 1926
- Died: 1 July 2017 (aged 90)

Sport
- Sport: Alpine skiing

Þórir Jónsson (22 August 1926 – 1 July 2017) was an Icelandic alpine skier. He competed in two events in the 1948 Winter Olympics.
