= Rolf Olinger =

Swiss alpine skier (1924–2006)

Olympic medal record

Men's Alpine skiing
Bronze medal – third place	1948 St. Moritz	Downhill

Ralph "Rolf" Olinger (17 December 1924 – 25 June 2006) was a Swiss alpine skier who competed in the 1948 Winter Olympics.

He was born in Engelberg.

In 1948 he won a bronze medal in the downhill competition.
