= Fernando Armiñán =

Spanish alpine skier (1927–1987)

Personal information
- Nationality: Spanish
- Born: 28 April 1927; Madrid, Spain
- Died: 1 June 1987 (aged 60); Madrid, Spain

Sport
- Sport: Alpine skiing

Fernando Armiñán (28 April 1927 – 1 June 1987) was a Spanish alpine skier. He competed in two events at the 1948 Winter Olympics. His cousin Jaime de Armiñán is a Spanish screenwriter and film director.
