= Jerzy Schindler =

Polish alpine skier (1923–1992)

Personal information
- Nationality: Polish
- Born: 5 February 1923; Zakopane, Poland
- Died: 10 May 1992 (aged 69); Kraków, Poland

Sport
- Sport: Alpine skiing

Jerzy Schindler (5 February 1923 – 10 May 1992) was a Polish alpine skier. He competed in two events at the 1948 Winter Olympics.
