= Hernán Oelckers =

Chilean alpine skier (1925–2009)

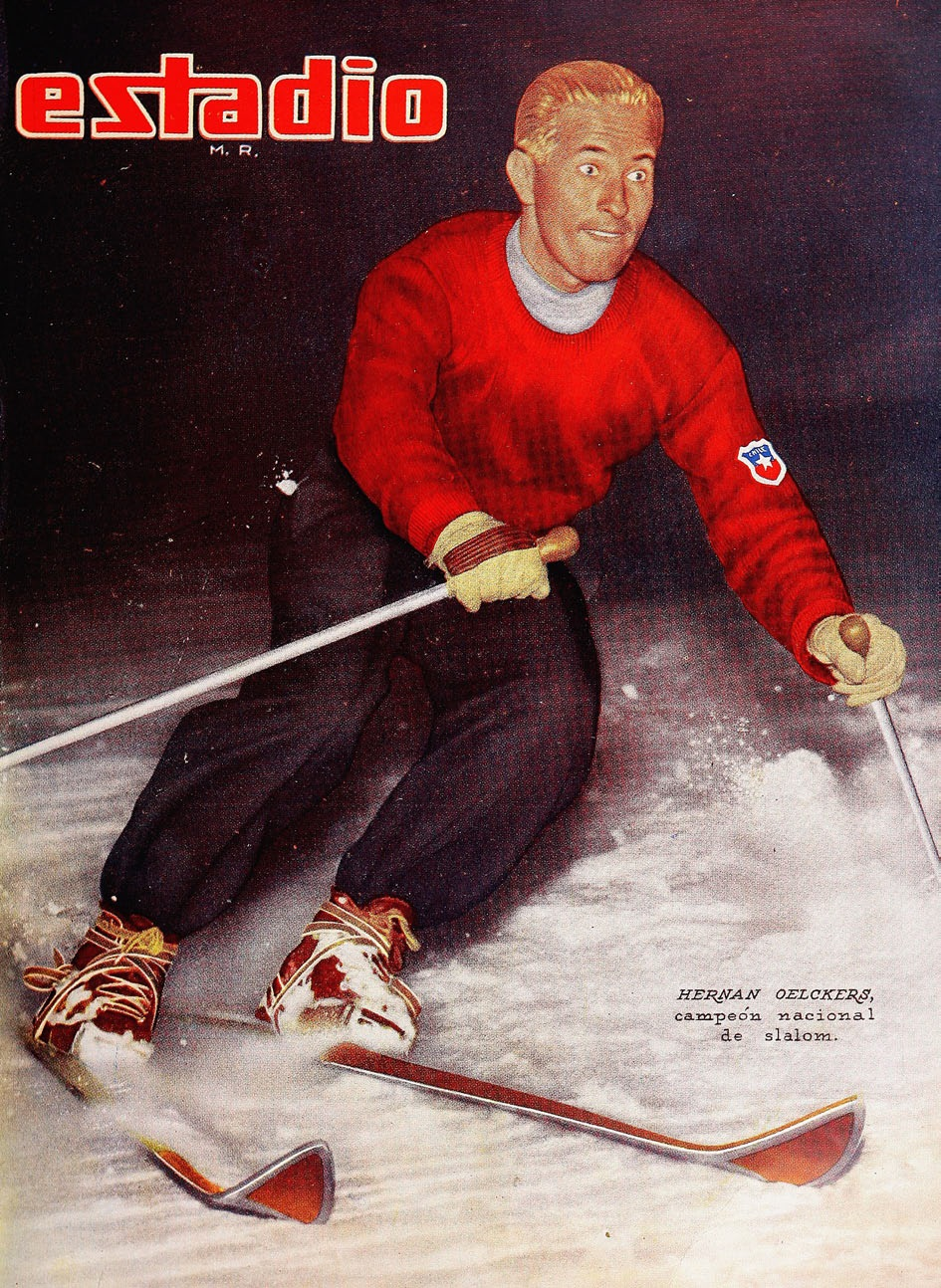

Personal information
- Born: 25 December 1925 Santiago, Chile
- Died: 2009 (aged 83–84)

Sport
- Sport: Alpine skiing

Hernán Oelckers (25 December 1925 – 2009) was a Chilean alpine skier. He competed in three events at the 1948 Winter Olympics.
