= José Vila =

Spanish alpine skier (1926–2001)

Personal information
- Nationality: Spanish
- Born: 19 August 1926; Barcelona, Spain
- Died: March 2001; Barcelona, Spain

Sport
- Sport: Alpine skiing

José Vila (19 August 1926 – March 2001) was a Spanish alpine skier. He competed in two events at the 1948 Winter Olympics.
