= Luboš Brchel =

Slovak alpine skier (1920–1981)

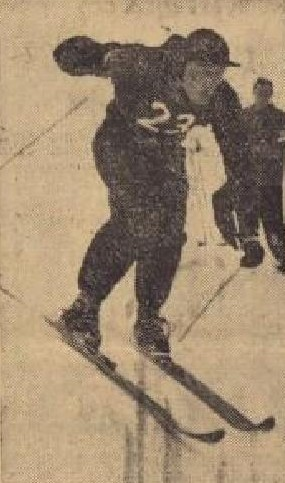

Personal information
- Nationality: Slovak
- Born: 7 March 1920; Kladno, Czechoslovakia
- Died: 31 October 1981 (aged 61); Radvaň nad Dunajom, Czechoslovakia

Sport
- Sport: Alpine skiing

Luboš Brchel (7 March 1920 – 31 October 1981) was a Slovak alpine skier. He competed in three events at the 1948 Winter Olympics.
