= Harry Taylor (alpine skier) =

British alpine skier (1924–1995)

Personal information
- Nationality: British
- Born: 12 March 1924
- Died: 27 November 1995 (aged 71); Los Angeles, California, United States

Sport
- Sport: Alpine skiing

Harry Clifford Taylor (12 March 1924 – 27 November 1995) was a British alpine skier. He competed in three events at the 1948 Winter Olympics.
