= Tamás Székely (skier) =

Hungarian alpine skier (born 1923)

Personal information
- Nationality: Hungarian
- Born: 29 April 1923
- Died: 18 January 1976 (aged 52)

Sport
- Sport: Alpine skiing

Tamás Székely (29 April 1923 – 18 January 1976) was a Hungarian alpine skier. He competed in three events at the 1948 Winter Olympics.
