= Georges Panisset =

French alpine skier (1929–2006)

Personal information
- Full name: Georges Célestin Michel Panisset
- Nationality: French
- Born: 17 February 1926; Morzine, France
- Died: 8 January 2006 (aged 79); Cluses, France

Sport
- Sport: Alpine skiing

Georges Panisset (30 December 1929 – 10 July 2006) was a French alpine skier who competed in the 1948 Winter Olympics.
