= Lajos Máté =

Hungarian alpine skier (1928–2022)

Personal information
- Nationality: Hungarian
- Born: 10 July 1928; Budapest, Hungary
- Died: 10 November 2022 (aged 94)

Sport
- Sport: Alpine skiing

Lajos Máté (10 July 1928 – 10 November 2022) was a Hungarian alpine skier. He competed in three events at the 1948 Winter Olympics. Máté died on 10 November 2022, at the age of 94.
