= Antonín Šponar =

Czech alpine skier (1920–2002)

Personal information
- Nationality: Czech
- Born: 8 April 1920 Prague, Czechoslovakia
- Died: 9 November 2002 (aged 82)

Sport
- Sport: Alpine skiing

Antonín Šponar (8 April 1920 – 9 November 2002) was a Czech alpine skier. He competed in three events at the 1948 Winter Olympics.
