= Steve Knowlton =

American alpine skier (1922–1998)

Personal information
- Nationality: American
- Born: August 3, 1922 Pittsburgh, Pennsylvania, United States
- Died: October 1, 1998 (aged 76) Denver, Colorado, United States

Sport
- Sport: Alpine skiing

Steve Knowlton (August 3, 1922 – October 1, 1998) was an American alpine skier. He competed in three events at the 1948 Winter Olympics.
