= Engelbert Haider =

Austrian alpine skier (1922–1999)

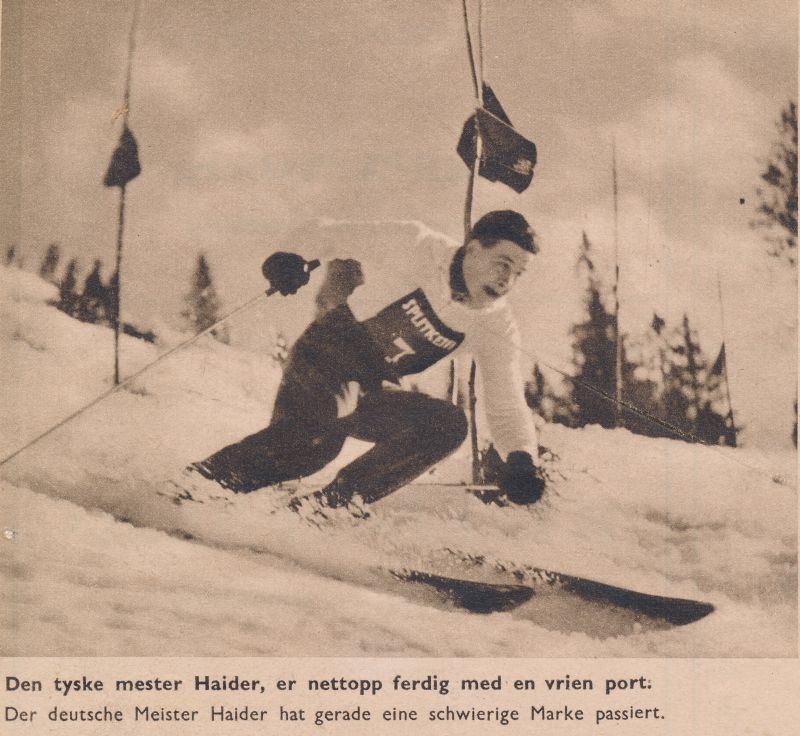
- Engelbert Haider in 1943

Personal information
- Nationality: Austrian
- Born: 20 April 1922 Reith bei Seefeld, Austria
- Died: 12 November 1999 (aged 77) Bad Wiessee, Germany

Sport
- Sport: Alpine skiing

Engelbert Haider (20 April 1922 – 12 November 1999) was an Austrian alpine skier. He competed in three events at the 1948 Winter Olympics.
