= Robert Blatt =

American alpine skier (1921–1994)

Personal information
- Nationality: American
- Born: November 3, 1921 Norfolk, Virginia, United States
- Died: July 5, 1994 (aged 72) San Carlos, California, United States

Sport
- Sport: Alpine skiing

Robert Blatt (November 3, 1921 – July 5, 1994) was an American alpine skier. Blatt, who attended Stanford University, won the Bradley Plate as the best all-around collegiate male skier at the 1940/1941 Sun Valley Intercollegiate meet, a four-day event beginning on December 29, 1940. He competed in Alpine skiing at the 1948 Winter Olympics, finishing 29th in men's combined and 44th in men's downhill.
