= Dursun Bozkurt =

Turkish alpine skier (1925–1992)

Personal information
- Nationality: Turkish
- Born: 12 February 1925; Gümüşhane, Turkey
- Died: 24 December 1992 (aged 67); Ankara, Turkey

Sport
- Sport: Alpine skiing

Dursun Bozkurt (12 February 1925 – 24 December 1992) was a Turkish alpine skier. He competed in three events at the 1948 Winter Olympics.
