= Franz Gabl =

Austrian alpine skier (1921–2014)

Medal record

Men's alpine skiing

Representing Austria

Olympic Games
Silver medal – second place	1948 St. Moritz	Downhill

Franz Gabl (29 December 1921 – 23 January 2014) was an Austrian alpine skier and Olympic medalist. He received a silver medal in the downhill at the 1948 Winter Olympics in St. Moritz.
