= Henri Oreiller =

French alpine skier

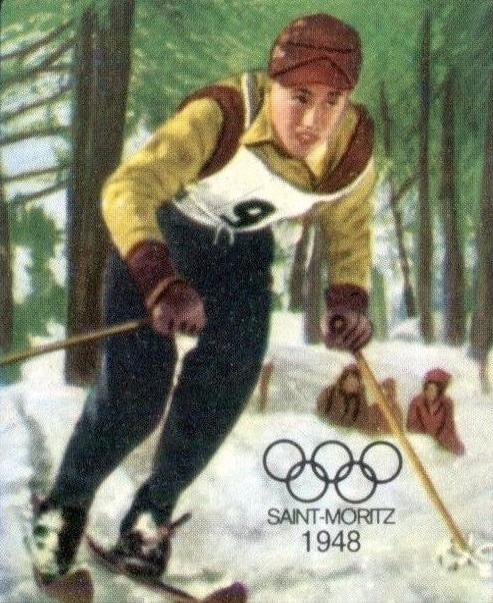
- An illustration of Henri Oreiller, ca. 1948

Personal information
- Born: 5 December 1925 Paris, France
- Died: 7 October 1962 (aged 36) Paris, France

Skiing career
- Sport: Alpine skiing
- Club: Val-d'Isère
- Retired: 1952 (age 26)
- Disciplines: downhill, giant slalom, slalom, combined

Olympics
- Teams: 2 – (1948, 1952)
- Medals: 3 (2 gold)

World Championships
- Teams: 3 – (1948, 1950, 1952) includes Olympics
- Medals: 3 (2 gold)
Medal record
Men's alpine skiing
Representing France
Olympic Games
Gold medal – first place	1948 St. Moritz	Downhill
Gold medal – first place	1948 St. Moritz	Combined
Bronze medal – third place	1948 St. Moritz	Slalom

Henri Jean Auguste Oreiller (5 December 1925 – 7 October 1962) was an alpine ski racer and Olympic gold medalist from France. He won two gold medals and a bronze at the 1948 Winter Olympics, becoming the most successful athlete at those Games in St. Moritz, Switzerland.

== Biography ==
Born in Paris, he is the son of Léon Oreiller, of Italian origin, and Marguerite Favre, from Savoie. His parents lived in Paris and frequented Val d'Isère for holidays. Oreiller was a member of Section Eclairuers Skieurs, a specialist skiing section of the French Resistance during World War II. After the liberation of Paris, he fought in the Alps in an elite winter combat unit of the French Army.

Nicknamed the "Parisian of Val d'Isère" or the "madman of downhill", he was the inaugural downhill gold medallist at the 1948 St. Moritz Olympics, with a record margin of four seconds over the runner-up. His medals cache included: the gold medal in the combined event, and the bronze medal in the special slalom. He missed one of his medal ceremonies because he was playing accordion in a local bar, and received his medal a week later.

He competed in the 1950 World Championships at Aspen and finished fourth in the new event, the giant slalom. At the 1952 Winter Olympics in Oslo, Oreiller was 14th in the downhill and 16th in the giant slalom.

Obsessed with speed, Oreiller retired from ski racing in 1952 at age 26 to take up motor racing. Ten years later, he had a racing car accident which took his life on 7 October 1962. A tire blowout at 100 mph (160 km/h) caused his Ferrari to flip at the Linas-Montlhéry autodrome and he later died at Hôpital Cochin in Paris.

At his shrine at Val d'Isère, where he is interred next to his wife, testimonies from around the world bear witness to his abilities.

== Arlberg-Kandahar ==
- Best result: 2nd place in slalom 1947 a Mürren and 1950 a Mürren.

== Others ==
- Winner of the Harriman Cup in 1949 in Sun Valley in the U.S., in downhill, slalom, and combined.
- Champion of France in special slalom in 1947.

== Motor racing ==
- Champion of France in "touring" category in 1959.
- Tour de France 1959, winner on points.
- Lyon-Carbonnière Rallye in 1960 and 1961.
