= Guðmundur Guðmundsson (alpine skier) =

Icelandic alpine skier (1920–2007)

Personal information
- Nationality: Icelandic
- Born: 1 May 1920 Akureyri, Iceland
- Died: 9 January 2007 (aged 86) Fossvogur, Iceland

Sport
- Sport: Alpine skiing

Guðmundur Guðmundsson (1 May 1920 – 9 January 2007) was an Icelandic alpine skier. He competed in three events at the 1948 Winter Olympics.
