= Slavko Lukanc =

Slovenian alpine skier (1921–1978)

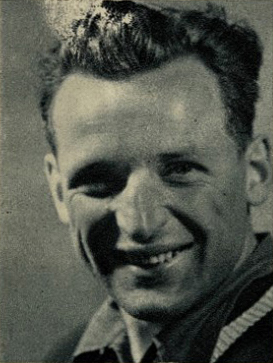
- A portrait of Slavko Lukanc

Personal information
- Nationality: Slovenian
- Born: 30 July 1921; Tržič, Yugoslavia
- Died: 22 May 1978 (aged 56)

Sport
- Sport: Alpine skiing

Slavko Lukanc (30 July 1921 – 22 May 1978) was a Slovenian alpine skier. He competed in two events at the 1948 Winter Olympics, representing Yugoslavia.
