= Bolesław Kolasa =

Polish ice hockey player

- Born: October 25, 1920; Lwów, Poland (now Lviv, Ukraine)
- Died: 16 April 2007 (aged 86)
- Position: Forward
- Played for: Pogoń Lwów; Wisła Krakow; Polonia Bytom
- National team: Poland
- Playing career: 1935–1939; 1946–1952

Bolesław Stanisław Kolasa (25 October 1920 - 16 April 2007) was a Polish former ice hockey player. He played for Pogoń Lwów, Wisła Krakow, and Polonia Bytom during his career. He also played for the Polish national team at the 1948 Winter Olympics
