= Péter Szikla =

Hungarian alpine skier

Personal information
- Nationality: Hungarian
- Born: 12 September 1918

Sport
- Sport: Alpine skiing

Péter Szikla (born 12 September 1918, date of death unknown) was a Hungarian alpine skier. He competed in three events at the 1948 Winter Olympics.
