= Yugoslavia at the 1948 Winter Olympics =

- Flag of Yugoslavia
- IOC code: YUG
- NOC: Yugoslav Olympic Committee

in St. Moritz
- Competitors: 17 (men) in 4 sports
- Medals: Gold 0 Silver 0 Bronze 0 Total 0

Winter Olympics appearances (overview)
- 1924; 1928; 1932; 1936; 1948; 1952; 1956; 1960; 1964; 1968; 1972; 1976; 1980; 1984; 1988; 1992; 1994; 1998; 2002

Other related appearances
- Croatia (1992–); Slovenia (1992–); Bosnia and Herzegovina (1994–); North Macedonia (1998–); Serbia and Montenegro (1998–2006); Montenegro (2010–); Serbia (2010–); Kosovo (2018–)

Athletes from the Federal People's Republic of Yugoslavia competed at the 1948 Winter Olympics in St. Moritz, Switzerland.

== Alpine skiing ==
Men

Athlete	Event	Race 1		Race 2		Total	
Athlete	Event	Time	Rank	Time	Rank	Time	Rank
Saša Molnar	Downhill					DNF	–
Jože Bertoncelj	Downhill					4:00.2	80
Ciril Praček	Downhill					3:52.3	71
Matevž Lukanc	Downhill					3:50.3	69
Slavko Lukanc	Downhill					3:37.1	54
Tine Mulej	Downhill					3:21.1	36
Franci Čop	Slalom	1:24.8	34	1:18.9	39	2:43.7	36
Matevž Lukanc	Slalom	1:17.2	25	1:13.7	30	2:30.9	27
Tine Mulej	Slalom	1:15.0	21	1:36.0	56	2:51.0	40
Saša Molnar	Slalom	1:11.4	13	1:12.0	28	2:23.4	18

Men's combined

The downhill part of this event was held along with the main medal event of downhill skiing. For athletes competing in both events, the same time was used (see table above for the results). The slalom part of the event was held separate from the main medal event of slalom skiing (included in table below).

Athlete	Slalom			Total (downhill + slalom)	
Athlete	Time 1	Time 2	Rank	Points	Rank
Jože Bertoncelj	1:38.5	1:19.6	43	55.14	51
Matevž Lukanc	1:29.3	1:13.1	31	42.81	37
Slavko Lukanc	1:27.1	1:15.4	32	35.45	34

== Cross-country skiing ==
Men

Event	Athlete	Race	
Event	Athlete	Time	Rank
18 km	Alojz Klančnik	1'33:02	69
18 km	Anton Pogačnik	1'29:08	56
18 km	Jože Knific	1'29:01	55
18 km	Matevž Kordež	1'28:37	53
18 km	Tone Razinger	1'28:24	51
50 km	Matevž Kordež	4'27:25	16
50 km	Franc Smolej	4'26:12	15
50 km	Jože Knific	4'26:00	14

Men's 4 x 10 km relay

Athletes	Race	
Athletes	Time	Rank
Tone Razinger; Tone Pogačnik; Matevž Kordež; Jože Knific	2'55:55	9

== Nordic combined ==
Events:

- 18 km cross-country skiing
- normal hill ski jumping

The cross-country skiing part of this event was combined with the main medal event, meaning that athletes competing here were skiing for two disciplines at the same time. Details can be found above in this article, in the cross-country skiing section.

The ski jumping (normal hill) event was held separate from the main medal event of ski jumping, results can be found in the table below. Athletes would perform three jumps, of which the two best jumps (distance and form) were counted.

Athlete	Event	Cross-country		Ski Jumping					Total	
Athlete	Event	Points	Rank	Distance 1	Distance 2	Distance 3	Points	Rank	Points	Rank
Tone Razinger	Individual	176.25	23	53.5	51.5	55.5	176.2	33	352.45	24

== Ski jumping ==
Athlete	Event	Distance 1	Distance 2	Total points	Rank
Franc Pribošek	Normal hill	54.5	57.0	187.4	32
Karel Klančnik	Normal hill	58.0	65.5	197.2	23
Janko Mežik	Normal hill	61.0 (fall)	62.0	136.9	43
Janez Polda	Normal hill	63.5	71.0 (fall)	145.2	41
