= Edy Reinalter =

Swiss alpine skier (1920–1962)

Personal information
- Born: 24 December 1920 St. Moritz, Switzerland
- Died: 19 November 1962 (aged 41) Tschagguns, Austria

Sport
- Sport: Alpine skiing
Medal record
Representing Switzerland
Olympic Games
Gold medal – first place	1948 St. Moritz	Slalom

Edy Reinalter (24 December 1920 – 19 November 1962) was an Alpine skier and 1948 Olympic champion in Slalom. He was the first Swiss athlete to win a gold medal at an Olympic Games held in Switzerland.
