= Bjarne Arentz =

Norwegian alpine skier (1928–2017)

Bjarne Arentz (2 December 1928 – 19 February 2017) was a Norwegian alpine skier. He was born in Oslo on 2 December 1928. Arentz participated at the 1948 Winter Olympics in Saint Moritz, where he competed in downhill, slalom and alpine combined. He became Norwegian champion in alpine combined in 1946. Arentz died in Oslo on 19 February 2017, at the age of 88.
