= Åke Nilsson (skier) =

Swedish alpine skier (1927–1991)

Personal information
- Nationality: Swedish
- Born: 10 September 1927; Storlien, Sweden
- Died: 5 September 1991 (aged 63); Östersund, Sweden

Sport
- Sport: Alpine skiing

Åke Nilsson (10 September 1927 – 5 September 1991) was a Swedish alpine skier. He competed at the 1948, 1952 and the 1956 Winter Olympics.
