= Matevž Lukanc =

Slovenian alpine skier

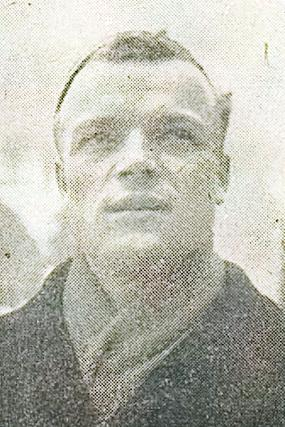

Personal information
- Nationality: Slovenian
- Born: 1 March 1926; Tržič, Yugoslavia
- Died: August 2002 (aged 76)

Sport
- Sport: Alpine skiing

Matevž Lukanc (1 March 1926 – August 2002) was a Slovenian alpine skier. He competed in three events at the 1948 Winter Olympics, representing Yugoslavia.
