= Bulgaria at the 1948 Winter Olympics =

- IOC code: BUL
- NOC: Bulgarian Olympic Committee
- Website: www.bgolympic.org (in Bulgarian and English)

in St. Moritz
- Competitors: 4 in 3 sports
- Medals: Gold 0 Silver 0 Bronze 0 Total 0

Winter Olympics appearances (overview)
- 1936; 1948; 1952; 1956; 1960; 1964; 1968; 1972; 1976; 1980; 1984; 1988; 1992; 1994; 1998; 2002; 2006; 2010; 2014; 2018; 2022; 2026; 2030

Bulgaria competed at the 1948 Winter Olympics in St. Moritz, Switzerland.

== Alpine skiing ==
Men

Athlete	Event	Race 1		Race 2		Total	
Athlete	Event	Time	Rank	Time	Rank	Time	Rank
Dimitar Drazhev	Downhill					4:07.1	82
David Madzhar	Downhill					3:45.3	62
David Madzhar	Slalom	1:38.7	49	1:19.6	40	2:58.3	47
Dimitar Drazhev	Slalom	1:33.1	45	1:20.9	44	2:54.0	44

Men's combined

The downhill part of this event was held along with the main medal event of downhill skiing. For athletes competing in both events, the same time was used (see table above for the results). The slalom part of the event was held separate from the main medal event of slalom skiing (included in table below).

Athlete	Slalom			Total (downhill + slalom)	
Athlete	Time 1	Time 2	Rank	Points	Rank
Dimitar Drazhev	1:49.0 (+0:05)	1:24.7	56	65.77	55
David Madzhar	1:38.9	1:18.5	42	46.67	44

== Cross-country skiing ==
Men

Event	Athlete	Race	
Event	Athlete	Time	Rank
18 km	Georgi Doykov	DNF	–
18 km	Nikola Delev	1'43:29	80

== Nordic combined ==
Events:

- 18 km cross-country skiing
- Normal hill ski jumping

The cross-country skiing part of this event was combined with the main medal event, meaning that athletes competing here were skiing for two disciplines at the same time. Details can be found above in this article, in the cross-country skiing section.

The ski jumping (normal hill) event was held separate from the main medal event of ski jumping, results can be found in the table below. Athletes would perform three jumps, of which the two best jumps (distance and form) were counted.

Athlete	Event	Cross-country		Ski Jumping					Total	
Athlete	Event	Points	Rank	Distance 1	Distance 2	Distance 3	Points	Rank	Points	Rank
Nikola Delev	Individual	105.00	38	42.0 (fall)	45.0	48.0	157.1	38	262.10	38
