= David Madzhar =

Bulgarian alpine skier (1920–1990)

Personal information
- Nationality: Bulgarian
- Born: 9 July 1920 Sofia, Bulgaria
- Died: 30 December 1990 (aged 70) Chicago, Illinois, U.S.

Sport
- Sport: Alpine skiing

David Douglas Madzhar (Bulgarian: Давид Маджар, 9 July 1920 – 30 December 1990) was a Bulgarian alpine skier. He competed in three events at the 1948 Winter Olympics. Madzhar died in Chicago, Illinois on 30 December 1990, at the age of 70.
