= Donald Garrow =

British alpine skier (1918–2001)

Personal information
- Nationality: British
- Born: 25 January 1918; Cuckfield, England
- Died: 25 February 2001 (aged 83); Chiltern, England

Sport
- Sport: Alpine skiing

Donald Hugh Garrow (25 January 1918 – 25 February 2001) was a British alpine skier. He competed in three events at the 1948 Winter Olympics.

From 1962-1983 he worked as a consultant paediatrician. He was followed in this capacity in the 1981 Man Alive documentary A Loving Thing to Do?
