= Thomas de Morawitz =

Spanish skier (1922–2016)

Personal information
- Full name: Thomas de Morawitz Meczy
- Nationality: Spanish
- Born: 21 December 1922; Prague, Czechoslovakia
- Died: 22 July 2016 (aged 93)

Sport
- Sport: Alpine skiing

Thomas de Morawitz Meczy (Note: In this Spanish name, the first or paternal surname is Morawitz and the second or maternal family name is Meczy.) (21 December 1922 – 22 July 2016) was a Spanish alpine skier. He competed in three events at the 1948 Winter Olympics.
