= Dimitar Drazhev =

Bulgarian alpine skier (1924–2014)

Personal information
- Born: 15 September 1924 Samokov, Bulgaria
- Died: 16 February 2014 (aged 89) Sofia, Bulgaria

Skiing career
- Sport: Alpine skiing
- Disciplines: Slalom, Downhill

Olympics
- Teams: 2 – (1948, 1952)

Dimitar Drazhev (Bulgarian: Димитър Дражев; 15 September 1924 – 16 February 2014) was a Bulgarian alpine skier. He has competed at the 1948 Winter Olympics and the 1952 Winter Olympics. He was one of the alpine ski sport pioneers in Bulgaria. He became chairman of the Bulgarian Ski Federation in 1946 and after completing his higher education in Moscow was reelected as chairman from 1956 to 1962. He later served as committee member representing Bulgaria in the International Ski Federation and dean of the ski faculty at the National Sports Academy "Vassil Levski". He is the father of alpine skier Vladimir Drazhev and the grandfather of the figure skater Hristina Vassileva.
