= Barney McLean =

American alpine skier (1917–2005)

Personal information
- Born: July 13, 1917 Lander, Wyoming, United States
- Died: July 19, 2005 (aged 87) Denver, Colorado, United States

Sport
- Sport: Alpine skiing

Robert "Barney" McLean (July 13, 1917 – July 19, 2005) was an American competitive skier and captain of the U.S. Olympic alpine ski team.

Raised in Hot Sulphur Springs, Colorado, McLean began ski jumping as a youth, winning his first title in 1933 at the age of 16 at the Western Jumping Championships. He later transitioned to alpine skiing, winning the 1942 U.S. National Downhill, Slalom, and Combined titles, as well as the Harriman Cup. During World War II, he served in the U.S. Army Air Forces as an instructor at the Arctic Survival School.

McLean served as team captain for the U.S. alpine squad at the 1948 Winter Olympics in St. Moritz, competing in the downhill, slalom, and combined events. Across a competitive career spanning nearly 30 years, he won nine national championships and was inducted into the U.S. National Ski Hall of Fame in 1959 and the Colorado Sports Hall of Fame in 1975.

== Legacy ==
McLean was closely tied to the early development of Winter Park Resort in Colorado, where he helped cut early ski trails and promoted regional skiing. In 2012, Winter Park Resort honored his contributions to the area's skiing heritage with a memorial dedication.
