= Jože Bertoncelj =

Slovenian alpine skier (1922–2012)

Jože Bertoncelj (6 April 1922 – 16 May 2012) was a Slovenian alpine skier who competed for Yugoslavia in the 1948 Winter Olympics.
