= Claude Penz =

French alpine skier (1924–2006)

Claude Penz (23 July 1924 – 6 March 2006) was a French alpine skier who competed in the 1948 Winter Olympics.
