= Hector Sutherland (skier) =

Canadian alpine skier (1927–2012)

Hector Easdale Sutherland (1927 – March 28, 2012) was a Canadian Olympic skier. Sutherland was Canadian National Downhill Champion in 1947 and in 1951 and competed as a member of the Canada Olympic ski team in 1948.

== Background ==
Sutherland was born in Montreal and was educated at Lower Canada College. At the 1948 Winter Olympics, Sutherland competed in the downhill, slalom and combined alpine skiing events. For the first 50 years of his life, he was a resident of Montreal; Sutherland then moved to Oakville, Ontario and later, in 2001, to Brockville. Sutherland married Nancy McGill, who predeceased him. He died in Brockville at the age of 84.
