= Albert Irwin =

Canadian alpine skier (1917–2006)

Personal information
- Nationality: Canadian
- Born: 1 October 1917; Princeton, British Columbia, Canada
- Died: 22 January 2006 (aged 88); Vancouver, British Columbia, Canada

Sport
- Sport: Alpine skiing

Albert Irwin (1 October 1917 – 22 January 2006) was a Canadian alpine skier. He competed in three events at the 1948 Winter Olympics.
