= Aimo Vartiainen =

Finnish alpine skier (1927–2023)

Aimo Vartiainen (14 July 1927 – 7 August 2023) was a Finnish alpine skier who competed in the 1948 Winter Olympics.

Vartiainen was born in Rovaniemi on 14 July 1927, and died on 7 August 2023, at the age of 96.
