= Edi Mall =

Austrian alpine skier (1924–2014)

Edi Mall (March 16, 1924 – September 4, 2014) was an Austrian alpine skier who competed in the 1948 Winter Olympics.
