= Jan Gąsienica Ciaptak =

Polish alpine skier (1922–2009)

Personal information
- Nationality: Polish
- Born: 17 December 1922; Zakopane, Poland
- Died: 29 October 2009 (aged 86); Zakopane, Poland

Sport
- Sport: Alpine skiing

Jan Gąsienica Ciaptak (17 December 1922 – 29 October 2009) was a Polish alpine skier. He competed at the 1948, 1952 and the 1956 Winter Olympics.
