= José Arias (alpine skier) =

Spanish alpine skier (1922–2015)

José Arias (27 August 1922 – 7 January 2015) was a Spanish alpine skier who competed in the 1948 Winter Olympics and was the flag bearer for Spain.
