= Alpine skiing at the 1948 Winter Olympics =

Alpine skiing at the V Olympic Winter Games
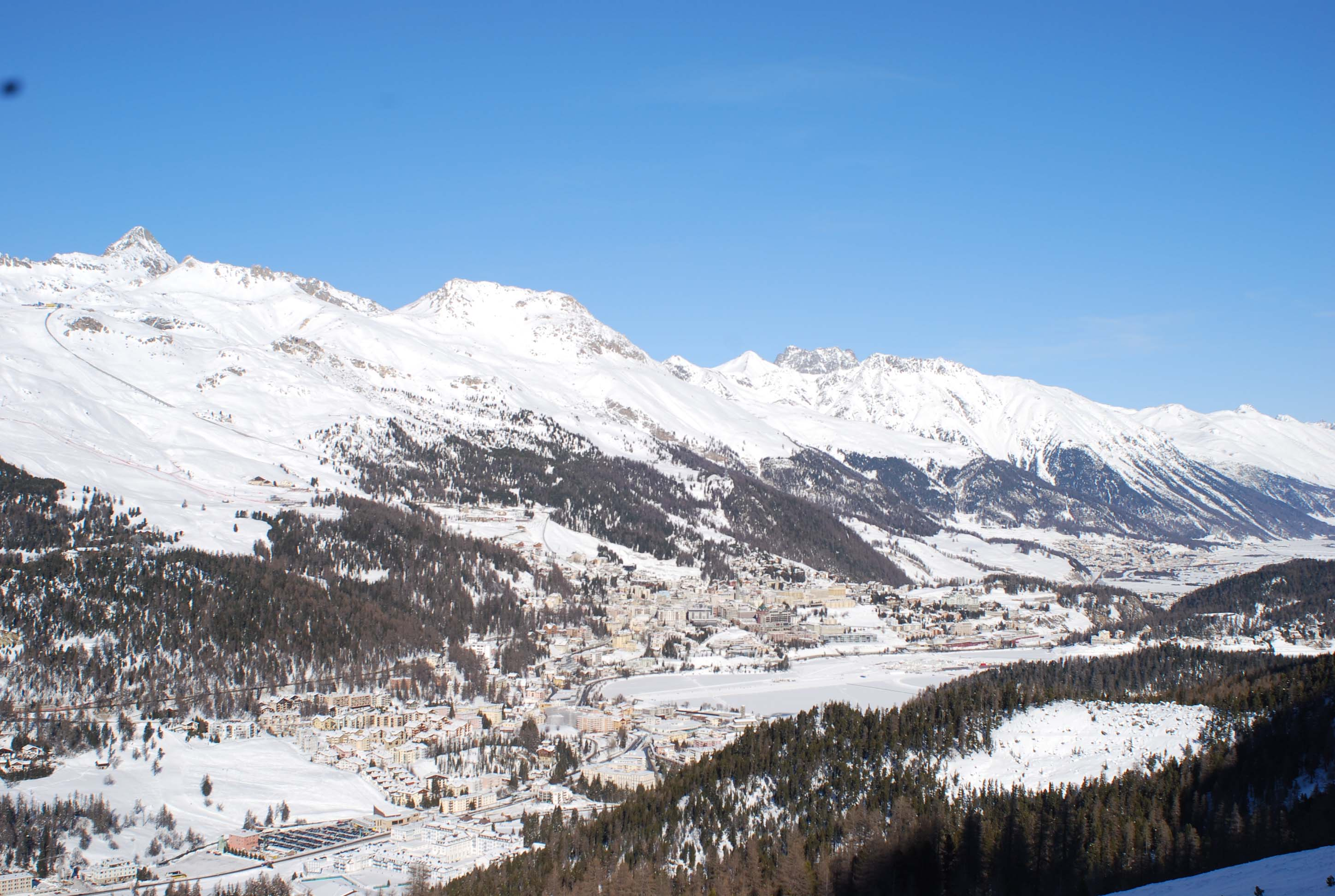
- St. Moritz sixty years later, in 2008
- Venue: Piz Nair, St. Moritz; Graubünden, Switzerland
- Dates: 2–5 February 1948
- Competitors: 174 from 25 nations

At the 1948 Winter Olympics in St. Moritz, Switzerland, the six alpine skiing events were held on Piz Nair from Monday, 2 February to Thursday, 5 February 1948.

After these games, the giant slalom was added and the combined event was dropped as an Olympic medal event for four decades, until 1988. From 1956 through 1980, the combined continued as an FIS medal event for the concurrent World Championships, using the results from three events, conducted as a "paper race."

Henri Oreiller of France earned a medal in all three events, with two golds and a bronze. Trude Beiser of Austria and Gretchen Fraser of the United States both won two medals, a gold and a silver each.

The first Olympics after World War II did not invite Germany or Japan.

== Medal summary ==
=== Men's events ===
Event	Gold		Silver		Bronze	
Downhill	Henri Oreiller; France	2:55.0	Franz Gabl; Austria	2:59.1	Rolf Olinger; Switzerland; Karl Molitor; Switzerland	3:00.3
Slalom	Edy Reinalter; Switzerland	2:10.3	James Couttet; France	2:10.8	Henri Oreiller; France	2:12.8
Combined	Henri Oreiller; France	3.27	Karl Molitor; Switzerland	6.44	James Couttet; France	6.95

=== Women's events ===
Event	Gold		Silver		Bronze	
Downhill	Hedy Schlunegger; Switzerland	2:28.3	Trude Beiser; Austria	2:29.1	Resi Hammerer; Austria	2:30.2
Slalom	Gretchen Fraser; United States	1:57.2	Antoinette Meyer; Switzerland	1:57.7	Erika Mahringer; Austria	1:58.0
Combined	Trude Beiser; Austria	6.58	Gretchen Fraser; United States	6.95	Erika Mahringer; Austria	7.04

== Medal table ==
Location in Switzerland

Rank	Nation	Gold	Silver	Bronze	Total
1	Switzerland	2	2	2	6
2	France	2	1	2	5
3	Austria	1	2	3	6
4	United States	1	1	0	2
Totals (4 entries)		6	6	7	19

== Participating nations ==
A total of 174 alpine skiers from 25 nations competed at the St. Moritz Games:

- Argentina (6)
- Austria (14)
- Belgium (2)
- Bulgaria (2)
- Canada (5)
- Chile (4)
- Czechoslovakia (6)
- Finland (2)
- France (13)
- Great Britain (14)
- Greece (2)
- Hungary (7)
- Iceland (3)
- Italy (8)
- Lebanon (2)
- Liechtenstein (6)
- Norway (11)
- Poland (5)
- Romania (7)
- Spain (8)
- Sweden (6)
- Switzerland (16)
- Turkey (4)
- United States (13)
- Yugoslavia (8)

== Course information ==
Date	Race	Start Elevation	Finish Elevation	Vertical Drop	Course Length	Average Gradient
Mon 2 Feb	Downhill – men	2,700 m (8,858 ft)	1,870 m (6,135 ft)	830 m (2,723 ft)	3.371 km (2.095 mi)	24.6%
Mon 2 Feb	Downhill – women	2,394 m (7,854 ft)	1,870 m (6,135 ft)	524 m (1,719 ft)	2.135 km (1.327 mi)	24.5%
Thu 5 Feb	Slalom – men	2,090 m (6,857 ft)	1,870 m (6,135 ft)	220 m (722 ft)		
Thu 5 Feb	Slalom – women	2,050 m (6,726 ft)	1,870 m (6,135 ft)	180 m (591 ft)		
Wed 4 Feb	Slalom – (K) – men	2,090 m (6,857 ft)	1,870 m (6,135 ft)	220 m (722 ft)		
Wed 4 Feb	Slalom – (K) – women	2,050 m (6,726 ft)	1,870 m (6,135 ft)	220 m (722 ft)		

== Participating nations ==
Twenty-five nations sent alpine skiers to compete. Despite being a part of the Axis until 1943, Italy was invited; Germany and Japan were excluded.

- Argentina
- Austria
- Belgium
- Bulgaria
- Canada
- Chile
- Czechoslovakia
- Finland
- France
- Great Britain
- Greece
- Hungary
- Iceland
- Italy
- Lebanon
- Liechtenstein
- Norway
- Poland
- Romania
- Spain
- Sweden
- Switzerland
- Turkey
- United States
- Yugoslavia
