= 1948 Winter Olympics =

Multi-sport event in St. Moritz, Switzerland

V Olympic Winter Games
- Logo for the 1948 Winter Olympics
- Location: St. Moritz, Switzerland
- Nations: 28
- Athletes: 671 (594 men, 77 women)
- Events: 22 in 4 sports (9 disciplines)
- Opening: 30 January 1948
- Closing: 8 February 1948
- Opened by: President Enrico Celio
- Stadium: St. Moritz Olympic Ice Rink

The 1948 Winter Olympics, officially known as the V Olympic Winter Games (German: V. Olympische Winterspiele; French: V^{es} Jeux olympiques d'hiver; Italian: V Giochi olimpici invernali; Romansh: V Gieus olimpics d'enviern) and commonly known as St. Moritz 1948 (French: Saint-Moritz 1948; Romansh: San Murezzan 1948), were a winter multi-sport event held from 30 January to 8 February 1948 in St. Moritz, Switzerland. The Games were the first to be celebrated in the aftermath of World War II; it had been twelve years since the last Winter Games in 1936. It was the first Winter Olympics held during the Cold War.

From the selection of a host city in a neutral country to the exclusion of Japan and Germany, the political atmosphere of the post-war world was inescapable during the 1948 Games. The organizing committee faced several challenges due to the lack of financial and human resources consumed by the war. These were the first of two winter Olympic Games under the IOC presidency of Sigfrid Edström.

28 nations marched in the opening ceremonies on 30 January 1948. Bibi Torriani played for the Switzerland men's national ice hockey team and became the first ice hockey player to recite the Olympic Oath on behalf of all athletes. Nearly 670 athletes competed in 22 events in four sports. The 1948 Games also featured two demonstration sports: military patrol, which later became the biathlon, and winter pentathlon, which was discontinued after these Games. Notable performances were turned in by figure skaters Dick Button and Barbara Ann Scott and skier Henri Oreiller. Most athletic venues have existed since St. Moritz first hosted the Winter Games in 1928. All the venues were outdoors, meaning the Games were heavily dependent on favorable weather conditions.

== Host city selection ==
The IOC selected St. Moritz to host the 1948 Games by acclamation at the 39th general session in Lausanne, Switzerland, on 6 September 1946. The selection process consisted of two bids, and saw St. Moritz be selected ahead of Lake Placid, New York, United States. St. Moritz was chosen because all of the venues of the 1928 Winter Olympics were available, and the Swiss resort could organize the Games much quicker than any other city except for 1936 host Garmisch-Partenkirchen which was not considered. Despite the existence of many of the 1928 sites, it was still a difficult task to organize a Winter Olympic Games in less than 18 months.

== Organizing ==
Location of St. Moritz in Switzerland

The Comité Olympique (CO) was composed of local dignitaries and members of the Swiss National Olympic Committee (COS). They decided to separate into several sub-committees responsible for various aspects of the Games. These committees included housing and maintenance, venue construction, finances, and media and advertising. The local committees worked very closely with the Swiss federal government and the IOC to ensure that the organization of the Games proceeded without hindrance. Since no athletes' village existed from the previous Games, the athletes and officials were housed in hotels around the city. It was essential for the committees to draw upon their experiences from the 1928 Olympics. Their selection of locations for the various events was contingent on the weather conditions, as all the events were held outdoors.

Over 800 people were involved in reporting the news of the Games to the world. Nearly 500 press credentials were issued by the Press Commission for the Games. Television would not make its Olympic debut until 1956. The coverage of the 1948 Games was split between newspapers and radio broadcasts. The organizing committee had to provide technology, such as long-distance telephone lines and telegraph services, to assist the press in communicating with their constituents.

Over 2,200 people were needed to provide all the services for the press, officials, and athletes at the Games. These services included sanitation, security, and care of the venues. Accommodating the influx of people into St. Moritz was difficult for the organizing committee. It was complicated by the mountainous region in which the community was situated. A massive project to improve the village's transportation infrastructure had to be completed before the Games. This included building and widening roads for vehicular traffic. Several train stations were built to accommodate the increased demands for public transit. They also had to increase the capacity of the city's sewers. All of the projects had to be approved by the Swiss government and justified by its impact on the success of the Games. To aid the organizing committee, the IOC demanded that all participating nations provide lists of their athletes several months before the Games. Consequently, the Swiss knew exactly how many athletes and officials to plan for.

== Politics ==
Since these Games were the first since World War II, they were named "The Games of Renewal". Japan and Germany were not invited to these Games because the international community still ostracized them for their role in World War II. Their absence was short-lived, though, as they returned to Olympic competition in 1952. The Soviet Union did not send athletes to the St. Moritz Games of 1948, but they did send ten delegates as observers of the Games to determine how successful the Soviet athletes would have been had they competed.

=== Impact of World War II ===
Sapporo, Japan had been the choice for the 1940 Winter Games. In 1938, the Japanese decided to decline the invitation to host the Games claiming that preparations for the Olympic Games were draining the country's resources. The IOC turned to the host of the 1936 Games, Garmisch-Partenkirchen, which would make it the only city to host consecutive Games. This became impractical when Germany invaded Poland on 1 September 1939; subsequently Germany withdrew its bid to host the Games. Finland believed it could host the Games and extended an invitation to the IOC, but the Soviet Union's invasion of Finland ended all hope of an Olympic Games in 1940. The 1944 Winter Olympics had been awarded to Cortina d'Ampezzo, Italy in 1939. As the war continued, this proved impractical, and the second consecutive olympiad passed without celebrating the Games. The IOC was presented with two possible host cities for the first post-war Games: Lake Placid, United States and St. Moritz, Switzerland. The IOC decided to award the Games to Switzerland, a neutral country immediately following World War II, to avoid political posturing by former combatants.

The impact of World War II was still being felt in 1948. The lack of financial resources and human energy made the organization of the Games challenging. Athletes were also affected by a lack of resources. Many competitors arrived with little or no equipment. In one notable case, Norwegian skiers had to borrow skis from the American team to compete.

== Events ==
Medals were awarded in 22 events contested in 4 sports (9 disciplines).

- Bobsleigh
  - Bobsleigh (2) ()
  - Skeleton (1) ()
- Ice hockey (1) ()
- Skating
  - Figure skating (3) ()
  - Speed skating (4) ()
- Skiing
  - Alpine skiing (6) ()
  - Nordic skiing ()
    - Cross-country skiing (3) ()
    - Nordic combined (1) ()
    - Ski jumping (1) ()

There were also two demonstration sports, military patrol and the winter pentathlon.

=== Bobsled ===
Two sliding sports were contested at the 1948 Winter Games; the first was bobsled. A controversy erupted when it was alleged that the sleds of the United States team had been sabotaged. It was discovered that the steering wheels had been damaged. After news broke of the apparent improprieties a truck driver stepped forward and admitted to having accidentally backed into the shed housing the bobsleds. The accident, however, did not hinder the United States teams, who won a bronze in the two-man event and a gold and a bronze in the four-man event. The Swiss two-man teams placed first and second, which is the best possible result for the event since only two teams were allowed to enter. The driver of the first place team, Felix Endrich, beat his coach, the driver of the second place team, Fritz Feierabend.

=== Ice hockey ===
The ice hockey tournament was won by Canada, with Czechoslovakia second and Switzerland third. This was the fifth Olympic gold medal for Canada in hockey. The only team to beat Canada since hockey was introduced at the 1920 Summer Olympics was Great Britain at the 1936 Winter Olympics. The tournament was almost canceled when rival teams representing the United States arrived. An Amateur Athletic Union (AAU) team was supported by the United States Olympic Committee (USOC), and an Amateur Hockey Association (AHA) team was supported by the Ligue Internationale de Hockey sur Glace (LIHG). The International Olympic Committee ruled that neither team could compete. Still, the Swiss organizing committee allowed the AAU team to march in the opening ceremony and the AHA team to play unofficially without being eligible for medals.

=== Figure skating ===
Barbara Ann Scott became the first and only Canadian woman to win an Olympic gold medal in figure skating when she won the competition at St. Moritz. Despite the distraction caused by a low-flying airplane during her compulsory routine, she could muster the focus to place first entering the free skate. The ice had been shredded the night before the free skate by two ice hockey games (the ice resurfacer had not yet been invented); nonetheless, she was able to adjust her routine to avoid the potholes and emerge victorious.

Eighteen-year-old American Dick Button completed the unprecedented North American sweep of the figure skating gold medals. He led the field after the compulsory skate and won the gold medal by becoming the first person to complete a double Axel in competition. Later in the 1952 Olympics, Dick Button would win gold a second time. Swiss world champion Hans Gerschwiler fell during the free skate, but rebounded to win the silver medal.

=== Speed skating ===
The speed skating competition was held on the same rink that had hosted the events in 1928. At 1,856 m (6,089 ft) above sea level, the speed skating competition was held at the second-highest altitude in Olympic history; only Squaw Valley in 1960 was higher. The competition was dominated by the Scandinavian countries of Norway and Sweden who won nine out of the twelve possible medals. Scandinavians had done poorly in speed skating events up until the 1948 Games. Their success was because speed skating in Europe had reached a standstill during World War II. Only countries that were ancillary to the conflict had the resources to keep their speed skating programs intact. The 500 meter race was won by Finn Helgesen of Norway. There was a three-way tie for second place between Norwegian Thomas Byberg and Americans Robert Fitzgerald and Kenneth Bartholomew. All three had finished in exactly 43.2 seconds. Swede Åke Seyffarth won a gold medal in the 10,000 meter race and a silver medal in the 1,500 meter race. The 5,000 meter event was affected by weather. The twenty racers encountered wind, sun, and snow during the day's competition. Finally, long-distance specialist Reidar Liaklev from Norway prevailed.

=== Alpine skiing ===
Alpine skiing made its Olympic debut at these Games. A few events had been held at the 1936 Games, but the St. Moritz Games featured a full slate of three men's and three women's alpine events. Frenchman Henri Oreiller won a medal in all three Alpine events: gold in the downhill and combined, and bronze in the slalom. He was one of only two athletes to win two gold medals at the 1948 Games, and he was also the only athlete to win three or more medals.

Austria dominated the women's alpine events, winning five out of nine possible medals. Trude Beiser was a double-medal winner, earning gold in the combined event and silver in the downhill. She was not the only female skier to win two medals, though United States skier Gretchen Fraser won gold in the slalom and took silver behind Beiser in the combined. Austrian Erika Mahringer earned two medals by winning bronze medals in both the slalom and the combined.

=== Cross-country skiing ===
In cross-country skiing, 106 skiers from 15 nations competed in three events. The events were the 50 kilometer race, the 18 kilometer race, and the 4 × 10 kilometer relay. There were no women's events at the 1948 Games. Martin Lundström of Sweden was the other athlete to win two gold medals when he won the 18 kilometer race and participated on the winning cross-country relay team. Sweden won seven out of fifteen possible medals in the Nordic events, including all three gold medals and a sweep of the 18 kilometer race. All fifteen medals were won by either Sweden, Norway, or Finland.

=== Skeleton ===
Skeleton made its second appearance at the Olympics during these Games. It debuted in St. Moritz at the 1928 Winter Olympics. Skeleton was a form of luge that had originally appeared in the St. Moritz region at the end of the 19th century. American John Heaton won his second Olympic medal in the skeleton; he won his first 20 years earlier when he was 19 years old. Italian slider Nino Bibbia won the gold medal. It was the first of his 231 career wins on the Cresta Boblsed track. One of the curves at Cesana Pariol, where the bobsled, luge, and skeleton events took place at the 2006 Winter Olympics in Turin, was named after Bibbia.

=== Nordic combined ===
The Nordic combined event had been contested at each Winter Olympics since 1924. Nordic combined required athletes to first compete in the open 18 kilometer cross-country ski race alongside the other cross-country competitors. Their times would be assigned a point value. The athletes would take two jumps off the ski jump hill two days later. The jumps would be given a point value, and the longest jump would be combined with their cross-country time to create a score. Traditional Nordic combined power Norway was stunned at the 1948 Games when Finland's Heikki Hasu became the first non-Norwegian to win the event. Norway did not even make the podium. Hasu's teammate Martti Huhtala took the silver, and Sven Israelsson from Sweden won the bronze.

=== Ski jumping ===
The Norwegians swept the ski jumping event. Birger Ruud had won the gold medal in the ski jumping event at both the 1932 and 1936 Winter Games. The twelve-year hiatus due to World War II meant that Ruud was 36 years old in 1948. He had retired from competition and was coaching the Norwegian team. However, when he arrived at the Games, he decided to come out of retirement and compete one last time. Despite not having competed for several years, he earned a silver medal. Norwegian Petter Hugsted won the gold and teammate Thorleif Schjelderup won the bronze.

=== Demonstration sports ===
Two demonstration sports were held at the 1948 Games. Military patrol had been a demonstration sport at the 1924, 1928, and 1936 Winter Olympic Games. It entailed a combination of cross-country skiing and shooting at targets. Eventually the competition would be renamed Biathlon and was made an official Olympic medal sport at the 1960 Games in Squaw Valley, United States. Winter pentathlon involved five competitions: 10 kilometer cross-country ski race, shooting, downhill skiing, fencing and horseback riding. This was the first and last time the event was held. Fourteen competitors took part in the event.

== Calendar ==
All dates are in Central European Time (UTC+1)

The opening ceremonies were held at 10:00 am on 30 January, along with the initial hockey games and the first two runs of the two-man bobsled. The closing ceremonies were held at 4:00 pm on 8 February. All of the medals were awarded at the closing ceremonies rather than immediately after the event, as current tradition dictates.

OC	Opening ceremony	●	Event competitions	1	Event finals	CC	Closing ceremony

January 1948 February 1948	30th Fri	31st Sat	1st Sun	2nd Mon	3rd Tue	4th Wed	5th Thu	6th Fri	7th Sat	8th Sun	Gold medals
Ceremonies	OC									CC	
Bobsleigh	●	1						●	1		2
Ice hockey	●	●	●	●	●	●	●	●	●	1	1
Figure skating							●	●	●		3
Speed skating		●	●	●	●						4
Alpine skiing				● ● ● ●			● ●				6
Cross-country skiing		●			●			●			3
Skeleton					●						1
Nordic combined				●							1
Ski jumping										●	1
Total gold medals		3	1	6	3		3	2	2	2	22
Cumulative Total		3	4	10	13	13	16	18	20	22	

== Venues ==
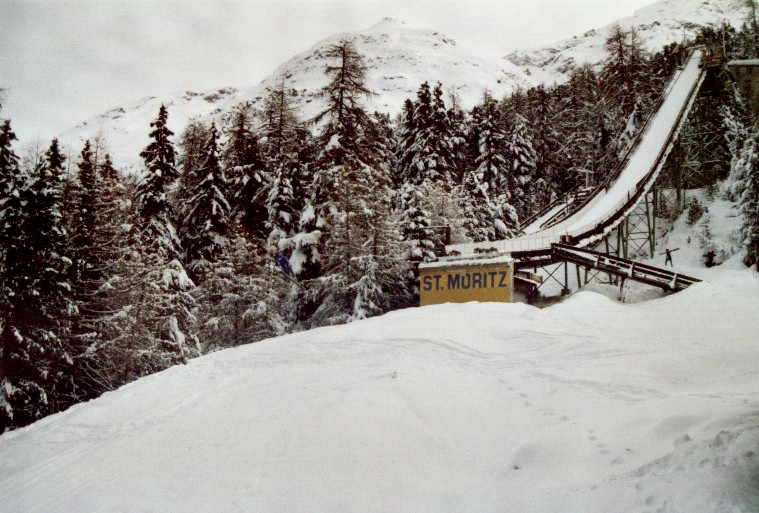
The Olympiaschanze ski jump hill in St. Moritz

The Stad Olympique (Olympic Stadium) hosted the opening and closing ceremonies. The stadium was also used for speed skating, the figure skating competition, and the medal games for ice hockey. Most of the ice hockey games were held at the Suvretta and Kulm stadiums in St. Moritz. Bobsled was held at the St. Moritz-Celerina Olympic Bobrun. Skeleton was contested on the Cresta Run track. Olympia Bob Run was built in 1897 and modernized for the 1948 Games, while the Cresta Run was first constructed in 1885. The ski jump competitions were held at Olympiaschanze ski jump hill in St. Moritz. It was built in 1927 for the 1928 Games and remained in use until 2006. The alpine events were held on ski-runs in and around Piz Nair.

== Participating nations ==
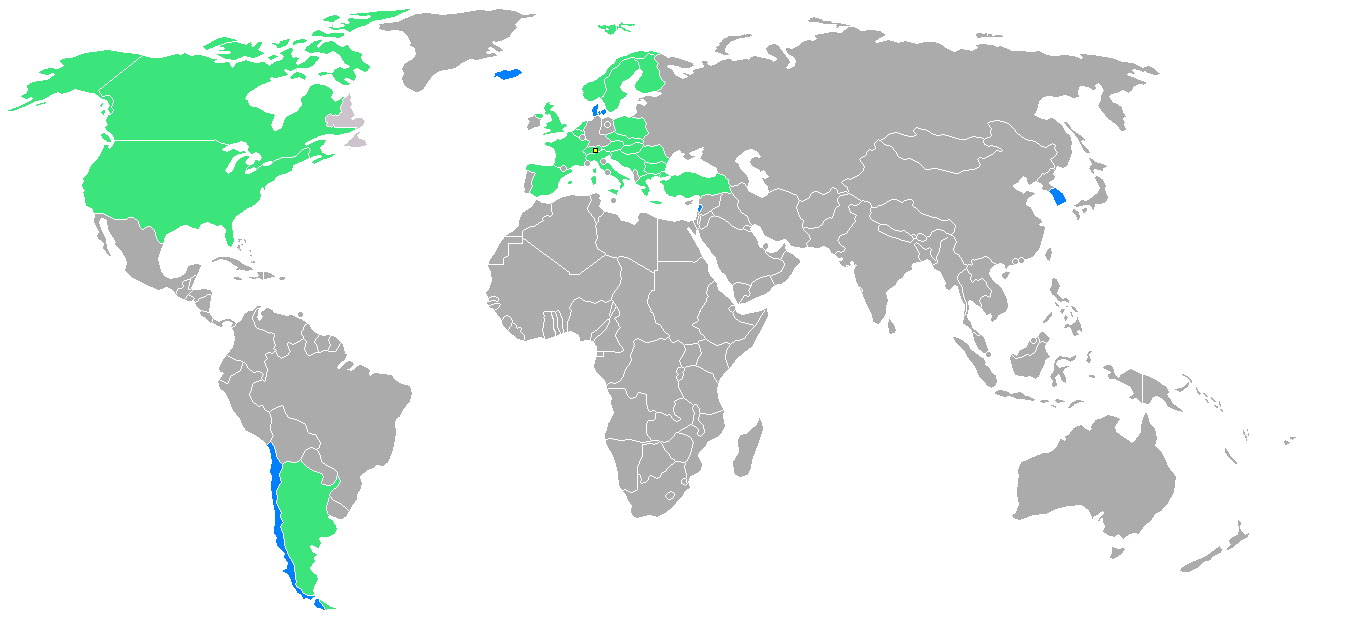
Participating nations

Twenty-eight nations competed in St. Moritz, the same number as the previous Winter Games in 1936. Chile, Denmark, Iceland, Korea, and Lebanon all made their Winter Olympic debut at these Games. Germany and Japan were not invited because of their involvement in World War II. Despite being an Axis power, Italy was allowed to send athletes after it defected to the Allies in 1943. Estonia, Latvia, and Lithuania had been annexed by the Soviet Union in 1940 and would not compete again as independent nations until 1992. Argentina returned to the Winter Games after missing the 1932 and 1936 Games, and Australia and Luxembourg did not compete in 1948, even though they had participated in 1936.

Participating National Olympic Committees
- Argentina (9)
- Austria (54)
- Belgium (11)
- Bulgaria (4)
- Canada (28)
- Chile (4)
- Czechoslovakia (47)
- Denmark (2)
- Finland (24)
- France (36)
- Great Britain (55)
- Greece (1)
- Hungary (22)
- Iceland (4)
- Italy (57)
- Lebanon (2)
- Liechtenstein (10)
- Netherlands (4)
- Norway (49)
- Poland (29)
- Romania (7)
- South Korea (3)
- Spain (6)
- Sweden (43)
- Switzerland (70) (host)
- Turkey (4)
- United States (69)
- Yugoslavia (17)

=== Number of athletes by National Olympic Committees ===
IOC Letter Code	Country	Athletes
SUI	Switzerland	70
USA	United States	69
ITA	Italy	57
GBR	Great Britain	55
AUT	Austria	54
NOR	Norway	49
TCH	Czechoslovakia	47
SWE	Sweden	43
FRA	France	36
POL	Poland	29
CAN	Canada	28
FIN	Finland	24
HUN	Hungary	22
YUG	Yugoslavia	17
BEL	Belgium	11
LIE	Liechtenstein	10
ARG	Argentina	9
ROU	Romania	7
ESP	Spain	6
BUL	Bulgaria	4
CHI	Chile	4
ISL	Iceland	4
NED	Netherlands	4
TUR	Turkey	4
KOR	South Korea	3
DEN	Denmark	2
LIB	Lebanon	2
GRE	Greece	1
Total		669

== Medal count ==
These are the top ten nations that won medals at the 1948 Winter Games.

* Host nation (Switzerland)

Rank	Nation	Gold	Silver	Bronze	Total
1	Norway	4	3	3	10
1	Sweden	4	3	3	10
3	Switzerland*	3	4	3	10
4	United States	3	4	2	9
5	France	2	1	2	5
6	Canada	2	0	1	3
7	Austria	1	3	4	8
8	Finland	1	3	2	6
9	Belgium	1	1	0	2
10	Italy	1	0	0	1
Totals (10 entries)		22	22	20	64

=== Podium sweeps ===
Date	Sport	Event	NOC	Gold	Silver	Bronze
31 January	Cross-country skiing	Men's 18 kilometre	Sweden	Martin Lundström	Nils Östensson	Gunnar Eriksson
7 February	Ski jumping	Normal hill	Norway	Petter Hugsted	Birger Ruud	Thorleif Schjelderup

== See also ==
- List of 1948 Winter Olympics medal winners
- 1948 Summer Olympics
- Olympic Games held in Switzerland
  - 1928 Winter Olympics – St. Moritz
  - 1948 Winter Olympics – St. Moritz
- List of IOC country codes

== Notes ==
Winter Olympics
Preceded by Cortina d'Ampezzo cancelled due to World War II	V Olympic Winter Games; St. Moritz; 1948	Succeeded by Oslo
