= List of athletes who competed in multiple sports at the Winter Olympic games =

In this list there are all the 372 Olympians (318 males and 54 females) that have competed in two or more sports at the Winter Olympic Games. These athletes are listed below, with the number of times they competed in each sport. Sometimes they competed in two disciplines at the same Games; such instances are noted.

The most common combinations of disciplines are biathlon/cross-country skiing (100 athletes), cross-country skiing/Nordic combined (83 athletes), Nordic combined/ski jumping (57 athletes) and cross-country skiing/Nordic combined/ski jumping (31 athletes).

19 of these (12 males and 7 females) have won medals in 2 different sports but only 5 athletes (3 males: Johan Grøttumsbråten, Heikki Hasu and Thorleif Haug; 2 females: Ester Ledecká and Anfisa Reztsova) won gold medals in 2 different sports. Of these 5 athletes, only 3 (Johan Grøttumsbråten, Thorleif Haug and Ester Ledecká) were able to win gold medals in different sport at the same Olympic Games.

== List of athletes ==
Men that won medals in different sports
Women that won medals in different sports
Athletes that won gold medals in different sports

Athlete	Country	Sex	Sports	First	Last	Total Olympic appearances
Xaver Affentranger	Switzerland	M	cross-country skiing 1, Nordic combined 1, ski jumping 1	1924	1924	1
Charlie Akers	/United States	M	biathlon 1, cross-country skiing 1	1960	1964	2
Henri Aldebert	France	M	bobsleigh 1, curling 1	1924	1924	1
Theo Allenbach	Switzerland	M	cross-country skiing 1, Nordic combined 1	1948	1948	1
Doug Anakin	Canada	M	bobsleigh 1, luge 1	1964	1964	1
Nikos Anastasiadis	Greece	M	biathlon 1, cross-country skiing 3	1988	1994	3
Georges André	France	M	bobsleigh 1, curling 1	1924	1924	1
Frederick Andrew	United Kingdom	M	biathlon 1, cross-country skiing 1	1964	1968	2
Apostolos Angelis	Greece	M	biathlon 1, cross-country skiing 3	1988	1994	3
Victor Arbez	France	M	biathlon 1, cross-country skiing 4	1956	1968	4
Luis Argel	Argentina	M	biathlon 1, cross-country skiing 1	1988	1992	2
Alfred Aufdenblatten	Switzerland	M	cross-country skiing 1, military patrol 1	1924	1924	1
Célia Aymonier	France	F	biathlon 1, cross-country skiing 1	2014	2018	2
Samir Azzimani	Morocco	M	alpine skiing 1, cross-country skiing 1	2010	2018	2
Karl Johan Baadsvik	Canada	M	alpine skiing 1, cross-country skiing 1, Nordic combined 1, ski jumping 1	1936	1936	1
William Ball	Canada	M	alpine skiing 1, cross-country skiing 1, Nordic combined 1	1936	1936	1
Klébert Balmat	France	M	Nordic combined 2, ski jumping 2	1924	1928	2
Antonín Bartoň	Czechoslovakia	M	cross-country skiing 1, Nordic combined 1, ski jumping 1	1932	1932	1
Hans Baumann	Austria	M	cross-country skiing 1, Nordic combined 1	1936	1936	1
Bayanjavyn Damdinjav	Mongolia	M	biathlon 2, cross-country skiing 1	1964	1968	2
Phil Bellingham	Australia	M	cross-country skiing 3, ski mountaineering 1	2014	2026	4
Baiba Bendika	Latvia	F	biathlon 3, cross-country skiing 1	2018	2026	3
Gustl Berauer	Czechoslovakia	M	cross-country skiing 1, Nordic combined 1	1936	1936	1
Lars Berger	Norway	M	biathlon 1, cross-country skiing 1	2010	2010	1
Willy Bernath	Switzerland	M	cross-country skiing 1, Nordic combined 1	1936	1936	1
Hedda Berntsen	Norway	F	alpine skiing 1, freestyle skiing 1	2002	2010	2
Nino Bibbia	Italy	M	bobsleigh 1, skeleton 1	1948	1948	1
Josef Bím	Czechoslovakia	M	military patrol 1, Nordic combined 1, ski jumping 2	1924	1928	2
Bizyaagiin Dashgai	Mongolia	M	biathlon 2, cross-country skiing 1	1964	1968	2
Ole Einar Bjørndalen	Norway	M	biathlon 6, cross-country skiing 1	1994	2014	6
Yves Blondeau	France	M	biathlon 1, cross-country skiing 1	1976	1980	2
Helmut Böck	Germany (1952), Germany (1956)	M	cross-country skiing 1, Nordic combined 1	1952	1956	2
Ludwig Böck	Weimar Republic	M	cross-country skiing 1, Nordic combined 1	1928	1928	1
Willy Bogner Sr.	Nazi Germany	M	cross-country skiing 1, Nordic combined 1	1936	1936	1
Harald Bosio	Austria	M	cross-country skiing 2, Nordic combined 1, ski jumping 2	1928	1936	3
Anna Bozsik	Hungary	F	biathlon 3, cross-country skiing 1	1992	1998	3
John Bower	United States	M	cross-country skiing 2, Nordic combined 2	1964	1968	2
Davide Bresadola	Italy	M	Nordic combined 1, ski jumping 3	2006	2018	3
Andžela Brice	Latvia	F	biathlon 2, cross-country skiing 1	1998	2006	3
Sverre Brodahl	Norway	M	cross-country skiing 1, Nordic combined 1	1936	1936	1
Ion Bucsa	Republic of Moldova	M	biathlon 1, cross-country skiing 1	1998	2002	2
Franciszek Bujak	Poland	M	cross-country skiing 1, Nordic combined 1	1924	1924	1
Rudolf Burkert	Czechoslovakia	M	Nordic combined 1, ski jumping 1	1928	1928	1
John H. Caldwell	United States	M	cross-country skiing 1, Nordic combined 1	1952	1952	1
Alexandra Camenșcic	Republic of Moldova	F	biathlon 1, cross-country skiing 2	2010	2014	2
John Carleton	United States	M	cross-country skiing 1, Nordic combined 1	1924	1924	1
Maurizio Carnino	Italy	M	short track speed skating 3, speed skating 1	1994	2006	4
Bart Carpentier Alting	Netherlands Antilles	M	bobsleigh 2, luge 1	1988	1992	2
Mihaela Cârstoi	Socialist Republic of Romania Romania, Romania	F	biathlon 2, cross-country skiing 1	1988	1994	3
Andrea Cecon	Italy	M	Nordic combined 1, ski jumping 1	1994	1994	1
Cesare Chiogna	Switzerland	M	Nordic combined 1, ski jumping 1	1932	1932	1
Jan Cífka	Czechoslovakia	M	cross-country skiing 1, Nordic combined 1, ski jumping 1	1932	1932	1
William Clark	Canada	M	alpine skiing 1, cross-country skiing 2, Nordic combined 1	1932	1936	2
James Couttet	France	M	alpine skiing 2, ski jumping 1	1948	1952	2
Iosif Covaci	Romania	M	alpine skiing 1, cross-country skiing 1	1936	1936	1
Niculae-Cornel Crăciun	Romania, Socialist Republic of Romania	M	cross-country skiing 1, military patrol 1, Nordic combined	1948	1952	2
Marvin Crawford	United States	M	cross-country skiing 1, Nordic combined 1	1956	1956	1
Krešimir Crnković	Croatia	M	biathlon 1, cross-country skiing 1	2018	2026	2
Linda Crutchfield-Bocock	/Canada	F	alpine skiing 1, luge 1	1964	1968	2
Antenore Cuel	Italy	M	cross-country skiing 1, military patrol 1	1948	1952	2
Bronisław Czech	Poland	M	alpine skiing 1, cross-country skiing 2, military patrol 1, Nordic combined 3, ski jumping 3	1928	1936	3
Eilert Dahl	Norway	M	cross-country skiing 1, Nordic combined 1	1948	1948	1
Sylvie Daigle	Canada	F	short track speed skating 2, speed skating 2	1980	1994	4
Ingenuino Dallagio	Kingdom of Italy	M	Nordic combined 1, ski jumping 1	1932	1932	1
Ezio Damolin	Italy	M	Nordic combined 3, ski jumping 1	1964	1972	3
Larry Damon	//United States	M	biathlon 1, cross-country skiing 3	1956	1968	4
Ophélie David	Hungary (1994), France	F	alpine skiing 1, freestyle skiing 2	1994	2014	3
Louis De Ridder	Belgium	M	bobsleigh 1, ice hockey 2, speed skating 1	1924	1936	2
Jens Deimel	Germany	M	Nordic combined 2, ski jumping 1	1992	1998	2
Justo del Carril	Argentina	M	alpine skiing 1, bobsleigh 1	1948	1948	1
Nikola Delev	Bulgaria	M	cross-country skiing 1, Nordic combined 1	1948	1948	1
John Dent	United Kingdom	M	biathlon 1, cross-country skiing 1	1964	1964	1
Mike Dixon	United Kingdom	M	biathlon 5, cross-country skiing 1	1984	2002	6
Olaf Dufseth	Norway	M	cross-country skiing 1, Nordic combined 1	1948	1948	1
Stefan Dziedzic	Poland	M	alpine skiing 1, cross-country skiing 1, Nordic combined 1	1948	1952	2
Adam Edelman	Israel	M	bobsleigh 1, biathlon 1	2018	2026	2
Mari Eder	Finland	F	biathlon 4, cross-country skiing 2	2010	2022	4
Hans Eder	Austria	M	cross-country skiing 1, Nordic combined 1, ski jumping 1	1952	1952	1
Lars-Erik Efverström	Sweden	M	cross-country skiing 1, Nordic combined 1	1952	1952	1
Willi Egger	Austria	M	Nordic combined 1, ski jumping 2	1956	1964	3
Hans Eidenbenz	Switzerland	M	cross-country skiing 1, Nordic combined 2, ski jumping 1	1924	1928	2
Trond Einar Elden	Norway	M	cross-country skiing 1, Nordic combined 2	1992	2002	3
Corey Engen	United States	M	cross-country skiing 1, Nordic combined 1	1948	1948	1
Jon Engen	United States	M	biathlon 2, cross-country skiing 1	1988	1994	3
Reşat Erceş	Turkey	M	alpine skiing 1, cross-country skiing 1	1936	1936	1
Susi Erdmann	Germany	F	bobsleigh 3, luge 2	1992	2006	5
Bengt Eriksson	Sweden	M	Nordic combined 2, ski jumping 1	1956	1960	2
Anja Eržen	Slovenia	F	biathlon 1, cross-country skiing 1	2010	2018	2
Yosuke Eto	Japan	M	Nordic combined 1, ski jumping 2	1960	1964	2
Hansjörg Farbmacher	Austria	M	biathlon 1, cross-country skiing 2	1964	1968	2
Theodore A. Farwell	/United States	M	cross-country skiing 3, Nordic combined 3	1952	1960	3
Jaroslav Feistauer	Czechoslovakia	M	cross-country skiing 1, Nordic combined 1, ski jumping 1	1932	1932	1
Erwin Fiedor	Poland	M	Nordic combined 2, ski jumping 1	1964	1968	2
Eric Flaim	United States	M	short track speed skating 2, speed skating 2	1988	1998	4
Taylor Fletcher	United States	M	Nordic combined 4, ski jumping 1	2010	2022	4
Henrik Forsberg	Sweden	M	biathlon 1, cross-country skiing 3	1992	2002	4
Magdalena Forsberg	Sweden	F	biathlon 2, cross-country skiing 2	1992	2002	3
Dumitru Frățilă	Romania, Socialist Republic of Romania	M	alpine skiing 1, bobsleigh 1, cross-country skiing 1	1948	1952	2
Herbert Fritzenwenger	West Germany	M	biathlon 1, cross-country skiing 1	1988	1988	1
Takashi Fujisawa	Japan	M	Nordic combined 1, ski jumping 2	1964	1972	3
Otto Furrer	Switzerland	M	cross-country skiing 1, military patrol 1	1928	1928	1
Leonid Fyodorov	Soviet Union	M	Nordic combined 2, ski jumping 1	1956	1960	2
Jacques Gaillard	France	M	Nordic combined 2, ski jumping 1	1972	1976	2
Jim Galanes	United States	M	cross-country skiing 2, Nordic combined 1	1976	1984	3
Jan Gąsienica Ciaptak	Poland	M	alpine skiing 3, ski jumping 1	1948	1956	3
Józef Gąsienica-Sobczak	Poland	M	biathlon 2, cross-country skiing 2	1956	1968	4
Gerhard Gehring	West Germany	M	biathlon 1, cross-country skiing 1	1968	1972	2
Georges Gereidi	Lebanon	M	alpine skiing 1, cross-country skiing 1	1956	1956	1
Francesco Giacomelli	Italy	M	Nordic combined 1, ski jumping 1	1976	1976	1
Paul Gibbins	United Kingdom	M	biathlon 2, cross-country skiing 1	1976	1980	2
Alexandre Girard-Bille	Switzerland	M	cross-country skiing 1, Nordic combined 1, ski jumping 1	1924	1924	1
Per Gjelten	Norway	M	cross-country skiing 1, Nordic combined 1	1952	1952	1
Ottar Gjermundshaug	Norway	M	cross-country skiing 1, Nordic combined 1	1952	1952	1
Elena Gorohova	Republic of Moldova	F	biathlon 3, cross-country skiing 2	1994	2006	4
Zsófia Gottschall	Hungary	F	biathlon 1, cross-country skiing 1	2002	2006	2
Aleksander Grajf	Yugoslavia (until 1988), Slovenia	M	biathlon 3, cross-country skiing 2	1984	2002	5
Simone Greiner-Petter-Memm	East Germany (1988), Germany	F	biathlon 1, cross-country skiing 1	1988	1994	2
Teja Gregorin	Slovenia	F	biathlon 3, cross-country skiing 1	2002	2014	4
Johan Grøttumsbråten	Norway	M	cross-country skiing 3, Nordic combined 3	1924	1932	3
Edgars Gruzītis	Latvia	M	cross-country skiing 1, Nordic combined 1	1936	1936	1
Josl Gstrein	Austria	M	cross-country skiing 1, Nordic combined 1	1948	1948	1
Katrin Gutensohn	Germany (1992-1998), Austria (2010)	F	alpine skiing 3, freestyle skiing 1	1992	2010	4
Oddbjørn Hagen	Norway	M	cross-country skiing 1, Nordic combined 1	1936	1936	1
Veikko Hakulinen	Finland	M	biathlon 1, cross-country skiing 3	1952	1964	4
Hubert Hammerschmied	Austria	M	cross-country skiing 1, Nordic combined 1, ski jumping 1	1948	1948	1
Clas Haraldsson	Sweden	M	cross-country skiing 1, Nordic combined 1	1948	1948	1
Paul Haslwanter	Austria	M	cross-country skiing 1, Nordic combined 1	1948	1948	1
Albert Hassler	France	M	ice hockey 3, speed skating 1	1924	1936	3
Heikki Hasu	Finland	M	cross-country skiing 2, Nordic combined 2	1948	1952	2
Thorleif Haug	Norway	M	cross-country skiing 1, Nordic combined 1, ski jumping 1	1924	1924	1
Anders Haugen	United States	M	cross-country skiing 2, Nordic combined 2, ski jumping 2	1924	1928	2
Heinz Hauser	Germany (1952), Germany (1956)	M	cross-country skiing 1, Nordic combined 2	1952	1956	2
Stanley Hayer	Czech Republic (2002), Canada	M	alpine skiing 1, freestyle skiing 1	2002	2010	2
Jennison Heaton	United States	M	bobsleigh 1, skeleton 1	1928	1928	1
John Heaton	United States	M	bobsleigh 1, skeleton 2	1928	1948	3
Heigoro Kuriyagawa	Japan	M	cross-country skiing 1, Nordic combined 1	1932	1932	1
Denise Herrmann	Germany	F	biathlon 2, cross-country skiing 1	2014	2022	3
Urban Hettich	West Germany	M	cross-country skiing 1, Nordic combined 3	1972	1980	3
William Hirigoyen	France	M	bobsleigh 1, skeleton 1	1948	1948	1
Hiroshi Tadano	Japan	M	alpine skiing 1, cross-country skiing 1	1936	1936	1
Hiroshi Yoshizawa	Japan	M	cross-country skiing 1, ski jumping 2	1952	1956	2
Olaf Hoffsbakken	Norway	M	cross-country skiing 1, Nordic combined 1	1936	1936	1
Gregor Höll	Austria	M	cross-country skiing 1, Nordic combined 1, ski jumping 1	1932	1948	2
Rudi Horn	Austria	M	biathlon 2, cross-country skiing 1	1976	1984	3
Hou Yuxia	China	F	biathlon 1, cross-country skiing 1	2002	2006	2
Martti Huhtala	Finland	M	cross-country skiing 1, Nordic combined 1	1948	1948	1
Hwang Byung-Dae	/South Korea	M	biathlon 1, cross-country skiing 1	1980	1984	2
Ensio Hyytiä	Finland	M	Nordic combined 1, ski jumping 1	1960	1964	2
Ileana Ianoșiu-Hangan	Socialist Republic of Romania Romania, Romania	F	biathlon 2, cross-country skiing 2	1988	1994	3
Bill Irwin	Canada	M	alpine skiing 1, cross-country skiing 1, Nordic combined 1, ski jumping 1	1948	1948	1
Isamu Sekiguchi	Japan	M	alpine skiing 1, Nordic combined 1	1936	1936	1
Sven Israelsson	Sweden	M	cross-country skiing 1, Nordic combined 1	1948	1948	1
Hiroshi Itagaki	Japan	M	Nordic combined 1, ski jumping 2	1968	1976	3
Sulo Jääskeläinen	Finland	M	Nordic combined 1, ski jumping 1	1924	1924	1
Thomas M. Jacobs	United States	M	cross-country skiing 1, Nordic combined 1	1952	1952	1
Albin Jakopič	Yugoslavia	M	Nordic combined 1, ski jumping 1	1936	1936	1
Menotti Jakobsson	Sweden	M	Nordic combined 1, ski jumping 1	1924	1924	1
Esko Järvinen	Finland	M	military patrol 1, Nordic combined 1, ski jumping 1	1928	1928	1
Olivier Jean	Canada	M	short track speed skating 2, speed skating 1	2010	2018	3
René Jeandel	France	M	cross-country skiing 1, Nordic combined 1	1948	1948	1
Walter Jeandel	France	M	cross-country skiing 1, Nordic combined 1	1948	1948	1
Don Johnson	United States	M	cross-country skiing 1, Nordic combined 1	1948	1948	1
Alfons Julen	Switzerland	M	cross-country skiing 1, military patrol 2	1924	1928	2
Jaroslav Kadavý	Czechoslovakia	M	cross-country skiing 1, Nordic combined 1	1948	1948	1
Alois Kälin	Switzerland	M	cross-country skiing 3, Nordic combined 2	1964	1972	3
Kang Kwang-bae	/South Korea	M	bobsleigh 1, luge 1, skeleton 2	1998	2010	4
Tanja Karišik-Košarac	Bosnia and Herzegovina	F	biathlon 2, cross-country skiing 3	2010	2018	3
Mahmut Şevket Karman	Turkey	M	alpine skiing 1, cross-country skiing 1	1936	1936	1
Esko Karu	Canada	M	biathlon 1, cross-country skiing 1	1968	1968	1
Katsumi Yamada	Japan	M	Nordic combined 1, ski jumping 1	1932	1932	1
Fritz Kaufmann	Switzerland	M	Nordic combined 1, ski jumping 1	1932	1932	1
Franz Keller	West Germany	M	Nordic combined 2, ski jumping 1	1968	1972	2
Arturo Kinch	Costa Rica	M	alpine skiing 3, cross-country skiing 4	1980	2006	5
Nastassia Kinnunen	/ Belarus (2010–2014), Finland (2022)	F	biathlon 2, cross-country skiing 1	2010	2022	3
Evgeni Klimov	Russia (2014), Olympic Athletes from Russia, ROC (2022)	M	Nordic combined 1, ski jumping 2	2014	2022	3
Rudolf Kloeckner	Romania	M	alpine skiing 1, cross-country skiing 1	1936	1936	1
Valery Kobelev	Russia	M	Nordic combined 1, ski jumping 2	1994	2002	3
Leopold Kohl	Austria	M	cross-country skiing 1, Nordic combined 3	1952	1964	3
Koichi Sato	Japan	M	Nordic combined 1, ski jumping 2	1956	1960	2
Anssi Koivuranta	Finland	M	Nordic combined 2, ski jumping 1	2006	2014	3
Paavo Korhonen	Finland	M	cross-country skiing 1, Nordic combined 3	1952	1960	3
Sarah Konrad	United States	F	biathlon 1, cross-country skiing 1	2006	2006	1
Bohumil Kosour	Czechoslovakia	M	cross-country skiing 1, military patrol 1, Nordic combined 1	1936	1948	2
Károly Kővári	Hungary	M	alpine skiing 2, Nordic combined 1	1936	1948	2
Andrzej Krzeptowski	Poland	M	cross-country skiing 1, Nordic combined 1, ski jumping 2	1924	1928	2
Józef Daniel Krzeptowski	Poland	M	cross-country skiing 1, Nordic combined 2, ski jumping 1	1948	1956	2
Tatiana Kutlíková	Slovakia	F	biathlon 2, cross-country skiing 1	1994	2002	3
Tadeusz Kwapień	Poland	M	cross-country skiing 3, Nordic combined 1	1948	1956	3
Peter Lahdenpera	/United States	M	biathlon 1, cross-country skiing 1	1960	1964	2
Johann Lahr	Czechoslovakia	M	Nordic combined 1, ski jumping 1	1936	1936	1
Anamarija Lampič	Slovenia	F	biathlon 1, cross-country skiing 2	2018	2026	3
Einar Landvik	Norway	M	cross-country skiing 1, ski jumping 1	1924	1924	1
Agostino Lanfranchi	Kingdom of Italy	M	bobsleigh 1, skeleton 1	1928	1932	2
Thierry Langer	Belgium	M	biathlon 2, cross-country skiing 1	2018	2026	3
Ester Ledecká	Czech Republic	F	alpine skiing 3, snowboarding 4	2014	2026	4
Erik Lesser	Germany	M	biathlon 3, cross-country skiing 1	2014	2022	3
Herbert Leupold	Nazi Germany	M	cross-country skiing 1, military patrol 1	1936	1936	1
Buck Levy	United States	M	cross-country skiing 1, Nordic combined 1	1956	1956	1
Li Xiaoming	China	M	biathlon 1, cross-country skiing 1	1980	1984	2
Lin Sin-rong	Chinese Taipei	M	bobsleigh 1, luge 1	2022	2026	2
Nils Lindh	Sweden	M	Nordic combined 1, ski jumping 1	1924	1924	1
Jaroslav Lukeš	Czechoslovakia	M	cross-country skiing 1, Nordic combined 1, ski jumping 2	1936	1948	2
Karl Lustenberger	Switzerland	M	Nordic combined 2, ski jumping 1	1976	1980	2
Benjamin Macé	France	M	short track speed skating 1, speed skating 1	2010	2014	2
Charles MacIvor	United Kingdom	M	biathlon 1, cross-country skiing 1	1980	1984	2
Andreja Mali	Slovenia	F	biathlon 3, cross-country skiing 1	2002	2010	3
Walter Malmquist	United States	M	Nordic combined 2, ski jumping 1	1976	1980	2
Valérie Maltais	Canada	F	short track speed skating 4, speed skating 1	2010	2026	5
Oļegs Maļuhins	Unified Team (1992), Latvia	M	biathlon 4, cross-country skiing 1	1992	2006	5
Maurice Mandrillon	France	M	cross-country skiing 1, military patrol 1	1924	1928	2
Hannu Manninen	Finland	M	cross-country skiing 1, Nordic combined 6	1994	2018	6
Karl Martitsch	Austria	M	cross-country skiing 1, Nordic combined 1	1948	1948	1
Andrzej Marusarz	Poland	M	Nordic combined 2, ski jumping 2	1932	1936	2
Stanisław Marusarz	Poland	M	cross-country skiing 1, Nordic combined 2, ski jumping 4	1932	1952	4
Takashi Matsui	Japan	M	Nordic combined 1, ski jumping 1	1960	1960	1
Jan Matura	Czech Republic	M	Nordic combined 1, ski jumping 3	1998	2014	4
Ville Mattila	Finland	M	cross-country skiing 1, military patrol 1	1924	1928	2
Gábor Mayer	Hungary	M	biathlon 2, cross-country skiing 1	1984	1992	3
Vlastimil Melich	Czechoslovakia	M	cross-country skiing 2, Nordic combined 3	1952	1960	3
Severino Menardi	Kingdom of Italy	M	cross-country skiing 2, Nordic combined 2, ski jumping 1	1932	1936	2
Rauno Miettinen	Finland	M	Nordic combined 4, ski jumping 2	1972	1984	4
Tormod Mobraaten	Canada	M	cross-country skiing 1, Nordic combined 1, ski jumping 2	1936	1948	2
Rolf Monsen	United States	M	cross-country skiing 2, Nordic combined 2, ski jumping 1	1928	1932	2
John Moore	United Kingdom	M	biathlon 2, cross-country skiing 3	1956	1964	3
Jorien ter Mors	Netherlands	F	short track speed skating 3, speed skating 2	2010	2018	3
Yury Moshkin	Soviet Union	M	Nordic combined 1, ski jumping 1	1956	1956	1
Timo Murama	Finland	M	Nordic combined 1, ski jumping 1	1936	1936	1
Dimitrios Negrepontis	Kingdom of Greece	M	alpine skiing 1, cross-country skiing 1	1936	1936	1
Colin Nelson	Canada	M	bobsleigh 1, luge 1	1968	1976	2
Otakar Německý	Czechoslovakia	M	cross-country skiing 1, military patrol 1, Nordic combined 2	1924	1928	2
Reinhard Neuner	Austria	M	biathlon 1, cross-country skiing 1	1998	2002	2
Andrew Nicholson	Australia	M	short track speed skating 2, speed skating 1	1992	1998	3
Claude Nicouleau	France	M	short track speed skating 1, speed skating 1	1988	1992	2
Eeti Nieminen	Finland	M	cross-country skiing 1, Nordic combined 2	1952	1956	2
Irina Nikulchina	Bulgaria	F	biathlon 2, cross-country skiing 2	1994	2006	4
Axel-Herman Nilsson	Sweden	M	Nordic combined 1, ski jumping 2	1924	1928	2
Halina Nowak-Guńka	Poland	F	biathlon 1, cross-country skiing 2	1992	1998	3
Paavo Nuotio	Finland	M	Nordic combined 1, ski jumping 1	1928	1928	1
Anita Nyman	Finland	F	biathlon 1, cross-country skiing 1	1998	2002	2
Olav Odden	Norway	M	cross-country skiing 1, Nordic combined 1	1948	1948	1
Reidar Ødegaard	Norway	M	cross-country skiing 1, military patrol 1	1928	1928	1
Ulli Öhlböck	Austria	M	cross-country skiing 1, Nordic combined 2	1968	1972	2
István Oláh Nelu	Hungary	M	biathlon 1, cross-country skiing 1	1992	1992	1
Keith Oliver	United Kingdom	M	biathlon 2, cross-country skiing 2	1972	1980	3
Ragnar Omtvedt	Norway	M	cross-country skiing 1, Nordic combined 1	1924	1924	1
Kåre Østerdal	Norway	M	cross-country skiing 1, Nordic combined 1	1948	1948	1
Martin Otčenáš	Slovakia	M	biathlon 2, cross-country skiing 1	2006	2018	3
Sigurd Overby	United States	M	cross-country skiing 1, Nordic combined 1	1924	1924	1
Jenny Owens	Australia	F	alpine skiing 1, freestyle skiing 2	2002	2014	3
Marek Pach	Poland	M	Nordic combined 1, ski jumping 1	1976	1976	1
Jeremy Palmer-Tomkinson	United Kingdom	M	alpine skiing 1, luge 3	1968	1980	4
Park Je-un	South Korea	M	Nordic combined 2, ski jumping 1	2018	2022	2
Park Seung-Hi	/South Korea	F	short track speed skating 2, speed skating 1	2010	2018	3
Stuart Parkinson	United Kingdom	M	alpine skiing 1, bobsleigh 1	1948	1956	2
Harald Paumgarten	Austria	M	cross-country skiing 2, Nordic combined 2, ski jumping 1	1928	1932	2
Martial Payot	France	M	cross-country skiing 2, Nordic combined 2, ski jumping 2	1924	1928	2
Snorre Pedersen	Norway	M	luge 1, skeleton 1	1992	2002	2
Arnd Peiffer	Germany	M	biathlon 3, cross-country skiing 1	2010	2018	3
Daniele Pellissier	Kingdom of Italy	M	cross-country skiing 1, military patrol 1	1924	1928	2
Enzo Perin	Italy	M	Nordic combined 3, ski jumping 2	1956	1964	3
Gottlieb Perren	Switzerland	M	alpine skiing 1, cross-country skiing 1, Nordic combined 1	1948	1952	2
Milanko Petrović	Serbia	M	biathlon 2, cross-country skiing 1	2010	2014	2
Brittany Phelan	Canada	F	alpine skiing 1, freestyle skiing 3	2014	2026	4
Tambet Pikkor	Estonia	M	Nordic combined 3, ski jumping 1	1998	2006	3
Victor Pînzaru	Romania	M	biathlon 1, cross-country skiing 1	2010	2014	2
Charles Proctor	United States	M	cross-country skiing 1, Nordic combined 1, ski jumping 1	1928	1928	1
Alfredo Prucker	Italy	M	cross-country skiing 2, Nordic combined 3, ski jumping 1	1948	1956	3
Casey Puckett	United States	M	alpine skiing 4, freestyle skiing 1	1992	2010	5
Merritt Putman	Canada	M	cross-country skiing 1, Nordic combined 1	1928	1928	1
Peter Radacher	Austria	M	cross-country skiing 1, Nordic combined 1	1952	1952	1
Daron Rahlves	United States	M	alpine skiing 3, freestyle skiing 1	1998	2010	4
Raido Ränkel	Estonia	M	biathlon 1, cross-country skiing 2	2014	2022	3
Ricardo Raschini	Brazil	M	bobsleigh 1, luge 1	2002	2006	2
Gilbert Ravanel	France	M	cross-country skiing 1, Nordic combined 1, ski jumping 1	1924	1924	1
Tone Razinger	Yugoslavia	M	cross-country skiing 1, Nordic combined 1	1948	1948	1
Ren Long	China	M	biathlon 1, cross-country skiing 1	2006	2014	2
Anfisa Reztsova	Soviet Union (1988), Unified Team (1992), Russia (1994)	F	biathlon 2, cross-country skiing 1	1988	1994	3
Rizzieri Rodeghiero	Italy	M	cross-country skiing 1, Nordic combined 1	1948	1948	1
Aleksandra Rodionova	Russia (2006–2010), Olympic Athletes from Russia (2018)	F	bobsleigh 1, luge 2	2006	2018	3
Paul Romand	France	M	biathlon 2, cross-country skiing 2	1956	1964	3
Aleksander Rozmus	Poland	M	Nordic combined 1, ski jumping 1	1928	1928	1
Józef Rubiś	Poland	M	biathlon 1, cross-country skiing 1	1956	1964	2
Birger Ruud	Norway	M	alpine skiing 1, ski jumping 3	1932	1948	3
Sigmund Ruud	Norway	M	alpine skiing 1, ski jumping 2	1928	1936	3
Ryoichi Fujisawa	Japan	M	cross-country skiing 1, Nordic combined 1, ski jumping 1	1952	1952	1
Evi Sachenbacher-Stehle	Germany	F	biathlon 1, cross-country skiing 3	2002	2014	4
Pál Sajgó	Hungary	M	biathlon 1, cross-country skiing 2	1952	1960	2
Sakuta Takefushi	Japan	M	cross-country skiing 1, Nordic combined 1	1928	1928	1
Sakurako Mukogawa	Japan	F	alpine skiing 1, freestyle 1	2022	2026	2
Pauli Salonen	Finland	M	cross-country skiing 1, Nordic combined 1	1948	1948	1
Jens Salumäe	Estonia	M	Nordic combined 2, ski jumping 2	1998	2006	3
Karl Magnus Satre	United States	M	cross-country skiing 1, Nordic combined 1	1936	1936	1
Keith Schellenberg	United Kingdom	M	bobsleigh 1, luge 1	1956	1964	2
Sepp Schiffner	Austria	M	cross-country skiing 1, Nordic combined 2	1952	1956	2
Peter Schmid	Switzerland	M	cross-country skiing 1, Nordic combined 1, ski jumping 1	1924	1924	1
Holger Schön	Sweden	M	Nordic combined 1, ski jumping 1	1932	1932	1
Suzanne Schulting	Netherlands	F	short track speed skating 3, speed skating 1	2018	2026	3
Hubert Schwarz	West Germany	M	Nordic combined 3, ski jumping 1	1980	1988	3
Sven Selånger	Sweden	M	Nordic combined 2, ski jumping 3	1928	1936	3
Clarence Servold	/Canada	M	cross-country skiing 2, Nordic combined 1	1956	1960	2
Irvin Servold	/Canada	M	cross-country skiing 1, Nordic combined 2	1956	1960	2
Jim Shea	United States	M	cross-country skiing 1, Nordic combined 1	1964	1964	1
Shen Li-Chien	Chinese Taipei	M	biathlon 1, cross-country skiing 1	1976	1976	1
Shinzo Yamada	Japan	M	cross-country skiing 1, Nordic combined 1	1936	1936	1
Norman Shutt	United Kingdom	M	biathlon 1, cross-country skiing 1	1960	1960	1
Olavi Sihvonen	Finland	M	cross-country skiing 1, Nordic combined 1	1948	1948	1
Haralds Silovs	Latvia	M	short track speed skating 1, speed skating 4	2010	2022	4
František Šimůnek	Czechoslovakia	M	cross-country skiing 2, Nordic combined 3, ski jumping 1	1932	1948	3
Patrick Singleton	Bermuda	M	luge 2, skeleton 1	1998	2006	3
Aulis Sipponen	Finland	M	cross-country skiing 1, Nordic combined 1	1952	1952	1
Anastasiya Skulkina	Russia	F	bobsleigh 1, luge 2	2002	2010	3
Simon Slåttvik	Norway	M	cross-country skiing 1, Nordic combined 1	1952	1952	1
Ole Stenen	Norway	M	cross-country skiing 1, military patrol 1, Nordic combined 1	1928	1932	2
Sverre Stenersen	Norway	M	cross-country skiing 1, Nordic combined 3, ski jumping 1	1952	1960	3
Fritz Steuri Jr.	Switzerland	M	Nordic combined 1, ski jumping 1	1932	1932	1
Vytautas Strolia	Lithuania	M	biathlon 3, cross-country skiing 1	2014	2026	4
Kazimiera Strolienė	Lithuania	F	biathlon 2, cross-country skiing 1	1992	1998	3
Thoralf Strømstad	Norway	M	cross-country skiing 1, Nordic combined 1	1924	1924	1
Niklaus Stump	Switzerland	M	cross-country skiing 1, Nordic combined 1	1948	1948	1
Sun Kuang-Ming	Chinese Taipei	M	bobsleigh 4, luge 2	1984	1998	4
Alfons Supersaxo	Switzerland	M	cross-country skiing 2, Nordic combined 2	1948	1952	2
László Szalay	Hungary	M	alpine skiing 1, Nordic combined 1	1936	1936	1
Gyula Szepes	Hungary	M	cross-country skiing 1, Nordic combined 1	1928	1928	1
Emőke Szőcs	Hungary	F	biathlon 1, cross-country skiing 1	2014	2018	2
Imre Tagscherer	Hungary	M	biathlon 3, cross-country skiing 1	2002	2010	3
Leopold Tajner	Poland	M	cross-country skiing 1, Nordic combined 1, ski jumping 1	1948	1952	2
Takemitsu Tsubokawa	Japan	M	cross-country skiing 1, Nordic combined 1	1932	1932	1
Peter Tancock	United Kingdom	M	biathlon 1, cross-country skiing 1	1968	1968	1
Akemi Taniguchi	Japan	M	cross-country skiing 1, Nordic combined 3	1960	1968	3
Alberto Tassotti	Italy	M	cross-country skiing 1, Nordic combined 1	1948	1948	1
Sergei Tchepikov	Soviet Union (1988), Unified Team (1992), Russia	M	biathlon 5, cross-country skiing 1	1988	2006	6
William Thompson	Canada	M	cross-country skiing 1, Nordic combined 1	1928	1928	1
Indrek Tobreluts	Estonia	M	biathlon 5, cross-country skiing 1	1998	2014	5
Tomomi Otaka	Japan	F	biathlon 1, cross-country skiing 2	1998	2006	3
Berger Torrissen	United States	M	cross-country skiing 1, Nordic combined 1	1936	1936	1
Jorge Torruellas	Puerto Rico	M	alpine skiing 1, freestyle skiing 1	1988	1992	2
Ralph Townsend	United States	M	cross-country skiing 1, Nordic combined 1	1948	1948	1
Panagiota Tsakiri	Greece	F	biathlon 1, cross-country skiing 2	2006	2014	3
Athanassios Tsakiris	Greece	M	biathlon 4, cross-country skiing 2	1988	2010	5
Tsutomu Sekido	Japan	M	alpine skiing 1, cross-country skiing 1, Nordic combined 1	1936	1936	1
Roderick Tuck	United Kingdom	M	biathlon 1, cross-country skiing 1	1964	1964	1
Adina Țuțulan-Șotropa	Socialist Republic of Romania Romania, Romania	F	biathlon 2, cross-country skiing 1	1988	1994	3
Ueng Ming-Yih	Chinese Taipei	M	biathlon 2, cross-country skiing 2	1976	1984	2
Lauri Valonen	Finland	M	Nordic combined 1, ski jumping 1	1936	1936	1
Adrien Vandelle	France	M	cross-country skiing 1, military patrol 1, Nordic combined 1	1924	1924	1
Paul Van den Broeck	Belgium	M	bobsleigh 1, ice hockey 1	1924	1924	1
Vitale Venzi	Kingdom of Italy	M	cross-country skiing 1, Nordic combined 1, ski jumping 1	1928	1928	1
Victor Verschueren	Belgium	M	bobsleigh 1, ice hockey 1	1924	1924	1
Franz Vetter	Austria	M	biathlon 1, cross-country skiing 2	1964	1968	2
Estere Volfa	Latvia	F	biathlon 1, cross-country skiing 1	2022	2026	2
Andrea Vuerich	Kingdom of Italy	M	cross-country skiing 1, Nordic combined 1	1932	1936	2
Wang Chunli	China	F	biathlon 1, cross-country skiing 1	2006	2010	2
Wang Jinfen	China	F	biathlon 2, cross-country skiing 1	1988	1994	3
Raoul Weckbecker	Luxembourg	M	alpine skiing 1, bobsleigh 2	1928	1936	2
Hermann Weinbuch	West Germany	M	Nordic combined 3, ski jumping 1	1980	1988	3
Gerda Weissensteiner	Italy	F	bobsleigh 2, luge 4	1988	2006	6
Franz Wende	Czechoslovakia	M	Nordic combined 1, ski jumping 1	1924	1928	2
Kuno Werner	Germany	M	biathlon 1, cross-country skiing 2	1956	1960	2
Kati Wilhelm	Germany	F	biathlon 3, cross-country skiing 2	1998	2010	4
Bjørn Wirkola	Norway	M	Nordic combined 1, ski jumping 3	1964	1972	3
Szczepan Witkowski	Poland	M	cross-country skiing 1, military patrol 1	1924	1924	1
Jonnie Woodall	United Kingdom	M	bobsleigh 1, luge 1	1972	1980	2
Marian Woyna Orlewicz	Poland	M	cross-country skiing 1, Nordic combined 1	1936	1936	1
Gordon Wren	United States	M	cross-country skiing 1, Nordic combined 1, ski jumping 1	1948	1948	1
Ruslan Zakharov	Russia, ROC (2022)	M	short track speed skating 2, speed skating 1	2010	2022	3
Ernesto Zardini	Kingdom of Italy	M	Nordic combined 1, ski jumping 1	1932	1932	1
Zhang Chengye	China	M	biathlon 2, cross-country skiing 1	2006	2010	2
Zhang Qing	China	M	biathlon 1, cross-country skiing 1	2002	2006	2
Zhao Jiawen	China	M	Nordic combined 2, ski jumping 2	2022	2026	2
Anna Carin Zidek	Sweden	F	biathlon 2, cross-country skiing 1	2002	2010	3
Spas Zlatev	/Bulgaria	M	biathlon 2, cross-country skiing 1	1984	1992	2
Alexandr Zubkov	Russia	M	bobsleigh 4, luge 1	1998	2014	5
Robert Zurbriggen	Switzerland	M	cross-country skiing 1, military patrol 1	1948	1948	1

N.B.: Alfred Aufdenblatten, Antenore Cuel, Otto Furrer, Alfons Julen, Herbert Leupold, Maurice Mandrillon, Ville Mattila, Reidar Ødegaard, Daniele Pellissier, Szczepan Witkowski and Robert Zurbriggen have participated at the military patrol at the Winter Olympics but it was just a demonstrative sport, so it's not clear if their Olympic appearance in military patrol is official or not (if it wouldn't be official they have to be eliminated from this list). Even Josef Bím, Niculae-Cornel Crăciun, Bronisław Czech, Esko Järvinen, Bohumil Kosour, Otakar Německý, Ole Stenen and Adrien Vandelle have participated at the military patrol and so be considered in this list but they wouldn't be eliminated from this table because they have participated at 3 or more different Winter sports.

=== By nation ===
In the next list there are the athletes of the table divided by nation. The total of this table is 394 because 19 athletes have competed for more than one nation: 16 athletes for 2 nations (Helmut Böck, Mihaela Cârstoi, Niculae-Cornel Crăciun, Ophélie David, Dumitru Frățilă, Aleksander Grajf, Simone Greiner-Petter-Memm, Katrin Gutensohn, Heinz Hauser, Stanley Hayer, Ileana Ianoșiu-Hangan, Nastassia Kinnunen, Oļegs Maļuhins, Aleksandra Rodionova, Adina Țuțulan-Șotropa and Ruslan Zakharov); 3 athletes for 3 nations (Evgeni Klimov, Anfisa Reztsova and Sergei Tchepikov).

Country	Number of athletes	M	F
Argentina	2	2	0
Australia	3	2	1
Austria	19	18	1
Belarus	1	0	1
Belgium	4	4	0
Bermuda	1	1	0
Bosnia and Herzegovina	1	0	1
Brazil	1	1	0
//Bulgaria	3	2	1
//Canada	18	14	4
China	8	5	3
Chinese Taipei	4	4	0
Croatia	1	1	0
Costa Rica	1	1	0
Czech Republic	3	2	1
Czechoslovakia	14	14	0
East Germany	1	0	1
Estonia	4	4	0
Finland	21	18	3
France	20	18	2
Germany	11	5	6
Germany	3	3	0
Greece	3	2	1
//Hungary	11	7	4
Israel	1	1	0
Italy	12	11	1
Japan	18	16	2
Kingdom of Greece	1	1	0
Kingdom of Italy	7	7	0
Latvia	6	3	3
Lebanon	1	1	0
Lithuania	2	1	1
Luxembourg	1	1	0
Mongolia	2	2	0
Morocco	1	1	0
Nazi Germany	2	2	0
Netherlands	2	0	2
Netherlands Antilles	1	1	0
Norway	26	25	1
Olympic Athletes from Russia	2	1	1
Poland	18	17	1
Puerto Rico	1	1	0
Republic of Moldova	3	1	2
ROC	2	2	0
Romania	8	5	3
Russia	8	5	3
Serbia	1	1	0
Slovakia	2	1	1
Slovenia	5	1	4
Socialist Republic of Romania	5	2	3
//South Korea	4	3	1
Soviet Union	4	3	1
Sweden	12	10	2
Switzerland	18	18	0
Turkey	2	2	0
United Kingdom	14	14	0
//United States	31	30	1
Unified Team	3	2	1
Weimar Republic	1	1	0
West Germany	6	6	0
Yugoslavia	3	3	0
Total	394	330	64

== Uncertain athletes ==
The next 47 athletes have an uncertain status: they haven't participated at one (or more) of 2 or more sports but their appearance in the Olympic official website is considered official. Some of them have an appearance in an unofficial Olympic sport or in a demonstrative sport. Some of them have been already included in the list above. There are also some contrasts between Olympedia and the Olympics official website regarding the number of appearances.

Sports in italics are those sports that are considered as official in the Olympics website or Olympedia but the athletes haven't participated at them (or 1 out of more times).

Athletes already included in the list above (17)

Athlete	Country	Sex	Sports	First	Last	Total Olympic appearances
Henri Aldebert	France	M	bobsleigh 1, curling 1	1924	1924	1
Erling Andersen	United States	M	cross-country skiing 1, Nordic combined 1, ski jumping 1	1932	1932	1
Levente Balatoni	Hungary	M	alpine skiing 1, ski jumping 1	1936	1936	1
William Ball	Canada	M	alpine skiing 1, cross-country skiing 1, Nordic combined 1	1932	1936	2
Raymond Berthet	France	M	cross-country skiing 1, Nordic combined 1	1932	1932	1
Dave Besteman	United States	M	short track speed skating 1, speed skating 2	1988	1994	3
Ed Blood	United States	M	cross-country skiing 1, Nordic combined 2	1932	1936	2
Franciszek Bujak	Poland	M	cross-country skiing 1, Nordic combined 1, ski jumping 1	1924	1924	1
Ernest Casimir-Lambert	Belgium	M	bobsleigh 1, skeleton 1	1928	1928	1
Bud Clark	Canada	M	alpine skiing 1, cross-country skiing 2, Nordic combined 1	1932	1936	2
Guy Clarkson	United Kingdom	M	cross-country skiing 1, ice hockey 1, ski jumping 1	1924	1924	1
Sylvie Daigle	Canada	F	short track speed skating 3, speed skating 2	1980	1994	5
Robert Dubreuil	Canada	M	short track speed skating 1, speed skating 1	1988	1992	2
Verner Eklöf	Finland	M	Nordic combined 1, ski jumping 1	1924	1924	1
Kaare Engstad	Canada	M	cross-country skiing 1, Nordic combined 1	1932	1932	1
Divina Galica	United Kingdom	F	alpine skiing 3, speed skiing 1	1964	1992	4
Aladár Háberl	Hungary	M	cross-country skiing 1, Nordic combined 1, ski jumping 1	1924	1924	1
Gregor Höll	Austria	M	cross-country skiing 1, Nordic combined 1, ski jumping 1	1932	1948	2
Kristian Hovde	Norway	M	cross-country skiing 1, Nordic combined 1	1932	1932	1
Pio Imboden	Italy	M	Nordic combined 1, ski jumping 1	1924	1924	1
Alfons Julen	Switzerland	M	cross-country skiing 1, military patrol 1	1924	1928	2
Alex Keiller	United Kingdom	M	cross-country skiing 1, Nordic combined 1, ski jumping 1	1924	1924	1
Rudolf Kloeckner	Romania	M	alpine skiing 1, cross-country skiing 1, Nordic combined 1	1936	1936	1
Sverre Kolterud	Norway	M	Nordic combined 1, ski jumping 1	1932	1932	1
Tara Laszlo	United States	F	short track speed skating 1, speed skating 1	1988	1992	2
Andrzej Marusarz	Poland	M	cross-country skiing 1, Nordic combined 2, ski jumping 2	1932	1936	2
Emmanuel Michon	France	M	short track speed skating 1, speed skating 2	1976	1988	3
Rolf Monsen	United States	M	cross-country skiing 2, Nordic combined 2, ski jumping 1	1928	1932	2
Tom Mobraaten	Canada	M	alpine skiing 1, cross-country skiing 1, Nordic combined 1, ski jumping 2	1936	1948	2
Henryk Mückenbrunn	Poland (1924), Switzerland (1928)	M	cross-country skiing 1, Nordic combined 1, ski jumping 1, ski joring 1	1924	1928	2
Colin Nelson	Canada	M	bobsleigh 1, luge 1	1968	1976	3
Tuure Nieminen	Finland	M	Nordic combined 1, ski jumping 1	1924	1924	1
Casper Oimoen	United States	M	Nordic combined 1, ski jumping 2	1932	1936	2
Sigurd Overby	United States	M	cross-country skiing 1, Nordic combined 1, ski jumping 1	1924	1924	1
Armas Palmros	Finland	M	Nordic combined 1, ski jumping 1	1924	1924	1
Stergios Pappos	Greece	M	alpine skiing 1, snowboarding 1	1992	1998	2
John Reeve	United States Virgin Islands	M	alpine skiing 1, bobsleigh 1	1988	1988	1
Arne Rustadstuen	Norway	M	cross-country skiing 2, Nordic combined 1	1932	1936	2
Erik Rylander	Sweden	M	Nordic combined 1, ski jumping 1	1932	1932	1
Karl Magnus Satre	United States	M	cross-country skiing 1, Nordic combined 1	1932	1936	2
Sven Selånger	Sweden	M	alpine skiing 1, Nordic combined 2, ski jumping 3	1928	1936	3
František Šimůnek	Czechoslovakia	M	cross-country skiing 2, Nordic combined 3, ski jumping 1	1932	1948	3
Bibi Torriani	Switzerland	M	ice hockey 3, ski joring 1	1928	1948	3
Donald Unger	Switzerland	M	bobsleigh 1, ice hockey 1	1924	1932	2
Hans Vinjarengen	Norway	M	Nordic combined 2, ski jumping 1	1928	1932	2
Georges de Wilde	France	M	ice hockey 1, speed skating 1	1924	1924	1
Katsumi Yamada	Japan	M	cross-country skiing 1, Nordic combined 1, ski jumping 1	1932	1932	1

== See also ==
- List of athletes with the most appearances at Olympic Games
- List of athletes who competed in both the Summer and Winter Olympics
- List of athletes who competed in more than one sport at Summer Olympic games
- List of multi-sport athletes
