= Austria at the 1948 Winter Olympics =

- IOC code: AUT
- NOC: Austrian Olympic Committee
- Website: www.olympia.at (in German)

in St. Moritz
- Competitors: 54 (42 men, 12 women) in 8 sports
- Medals Ranked 7th: Gold 1 Silver 3 Bronze 4 Total 8

Winter Olympics appearances (overview)
- 1924; 1928; 1932; 1936; 1948; 1952; 1956; 1960; 1964; 1968; 1972; 1976; 1980; 1984; 1988; 1992; 1994; 1998; 2002; 2006; 2010; 2014; 2018; 2022; 2026

Austria competed at the 1948 Winter Olympics in St. Moritz, Switzerland.

== Medalists ==
Medal	Name	Sport	Event
Gold	Trude Jochum-Beiser	Alpine skiing	Women's combined
Silver	Franz Gabl	Alpine skiing	Men's downhill
Silver	Trude Jochum-Beiser	Alpine skiing	Women's downhill
Silver	Eva Pawlik	Figure skating	Women's singles
Bronze	Resi Hammerer	Alpine skiing	Women's downhill
Bronze	Erika Mahringer	Alpine skiing	Women's slalom
Bronze	Erika Mahringer	Alpine skiing	Women's combined
Bronze	Edi Rada	Figure skating	Men's singles

== Alpine skiing ==
Men

Athlete	Event	Race 1		Race 2		Total	
Athlete	Event	Time	Rank	Time	Rank	Time	Rank
Edi Mall	Downhill					3:09.3	19
Eberhard Kneisl	Downhill					3:08.3	15
Engelbert Haider	Downhill					3:08.2	14
Hans Nogler	Downhill					3:03.2	9
Egon Schöpf	Downhill					3:01.2	5
Franz Gabl	Downhill					2:59.1	2nd place, silver medalist(s)
Christian Pravda	Slalom	DSQ	–	–	–	DSQ	–
Anton Hinterholzen	Slalom	DNF	–	–	–	DNF	–
Engelbert Haider	Slalom	1:13.3	17	1:09.5	22	2:22.8	17
Edi Mall	Slalom	1:12.2	15	1:06.1	12	2:18.3	11
Egon Schöpf	Slalom	1:11.1	11	1:03.1	2	2:14.2	6

Men's combined

The downhill part of this event was held along with the main medal event of downhill skiing. For athletes competing in both events, the same time was used (see table above for the results). The slalom part of the event was held separate from the main medal event of slalom skiing (included in table below).

Athlete	Slalom			Total (downhill + slalom)	
Athlete	Time 1	Time 2	Rank	Points	Rank
Eberhard Kneisl	1:18.1	1:07.8	12	12.36	11
Engelbert Haider	1:16.4	1:11.8	16	13.26	13
Hans Nogler	1:12.2	1:14.8	14	9.96	8
Edi Mall	1:09.5	1:06.5	2	8.54	4

Women

Athlete	Event	Race 1		Race 2		Total	
Athlete	Event	Time	Rank	Time	Rank	Time	Rank
Sophie Nogler	Downhill					2:47.0	26
Erika Mahringer	Downhill					2:39.3	19
Anneliese Schuh-Proxauf	Downhill					2:39.0	17
Annelore Zückert	Downhill					2:38.4	16
Resi Hammerer	Downhill					2:30.2	3rd place, bronze medalist(s)
Trude Jochum-Beiser	Downhill					2:29.1	2nd place, silver medalist(s)
Annelore Zückert	Slalom	DSQ	–	–	–	DSQ	–
Anneliese Schuh-Proxauf	Slalom	1:06.9	15	59.8	7	2:06.7	6
Resi Hammerer	Slalom	1:04.4	9	1:04.2	13	2:08.6	7
Erika Mahringer	Slalom	59.8	2	58.2	5	1:58.0	3rd place, bronze medalist(s)

Women's combined

The downhill part of this event was held along with the main medal event of downhill skiing. For athletes competing in both events, the same time was used (see table above for the results). The slalom part of the event was held separate from the main medal event of slalom skiing (included in table below).

Athlete	Slalom			Total (downhill + slalom)	
Athlete	Time 1	Time 2	Rank	Points	Rank
Resi Hammerer	1:08.9	1:10.9	18	11.87	12
Anneliese Schuh-Proxauf	1:02.1	1:02.2	3	9.76	7
Trude Jochum-Beiser	1:01.8	1:08.7	8	6.58	1st place, gold medalist(s)
Erika Mahringer	58.4	59.7	1	7.04	3rd place, bronze medalist(s)

== Cross-country skiing ==
Men

Event	Athlete	Race	
Event	Athlete	Time	Rank
18 km	Hubert Hammerschmied	1'32:47	68
18 km	Karl Martitsch	1'31:19	64
18 km	Paul Haslwanter	1'31:00	61
18 km	Josef Deutschmann	1'27:43	46
18 km	Matthias Noichl	1'27:34	45
18 km	Engelbert Hundertpfund	1'25:41	39
18 km	Josl Gstrein	1'25:04	36
18 km	Karl Rafreider	1:23.19	28
50 km	Josl Gstrein	4'21:13	12

Men's 4 x 10 km relay

Athletes	Race	
Athletes	Time	Rank
Josl Gstrein; Josef Deutschmann; Engelbert Hundertpfund; Karl Rafreider	2'47:18	4

== Figure skating ==
Men

Athlete	CF	FS	Points	Places	Final rank
Helmut Seibt	8	12	162.655	79	9
Hellmut May	7	7	165.666	68	8
Edi Rada	3	4	178.133	33	3rd place, bronze medalist(s)

Women

Athlete	CF	FS	Points	Places	Final rank
Ingeborg Solar	23	9	135.444	186	20
Hildegard Appeltauer	18	20	139.300	155	18
Martha Bachem	14	7	144.456	103	9
Eva Pawlik	3	2	157.588	24	2nd place, silver medalist(s)

Pairs

Athletes	Points	Places	Final rank
Susi Giebisch; Helmut Seibt	9.290	117.5	11
Herta Ratzenhofer; Emil Ratzenhofer	9.436	111.5	9

== Ice hockey ==
The tournament was run in a round-robin format with nine teams participating.

	Pld	W	L	T	GF	GA	Pts
Canada	8	7	0	1	69	5	15
Czechoslovakia	8	7	0	1	80	18	15
Switzerland	8	6	2	0	67	21	12
Sweden	8	4	4	0	55	28	8
Great Britain	8	3	5	0	39	47	6
Poland	8	2	6	0	29	97	4
Austria 7th	8	1	7	0	33	77	2
Italy	8	0	8	0	24	156	0
United States *	8	5	3	0	86	33	10

* United States team was disqualified. Only eight teams are officially ranked.

- Poland 7-5 Austria
- United Kingdom 5-4 Austria
- Switzerland 11-2 Austria
- Sweden 7-1 Austria
- Czechoslovakia 17-3 Austria
- Austria 16-5 Italy
- USA 13-2 Austria
- Canada 12-0 Austria

Contestants; Albert Böhm; Franz Csöngei; Fritz Demmer; Egon Engel; Walter Feistritzer; Gustav Gross; Adolf Hafner; Fredl Huber; Julius Juhn; Oskar Nowak; Hansjörg Reichel; Hans Schneider; Willibald Stanek; Herbert Ulrich; Fritz Walter; Helfried Winger; Rudolf Wurmbrandt

== Nordic combined ==
Events:

- 18 km cross-country skiing
- normal hill ski jumping

The cross-country skiing part of this event was combined with the main medal event, meaning that athletes competing here were skiing for two disciplines at the same time. Details can be found above in this article, in the cross-country skiing section.

The ski jumping (normal hill) event was held separate from the main medal event of ski jumping, results can be found in the table below. Athletes would perform three jumps, of which the two best jumps (distance and form) were counted.

Athlete	Event	Cross-country		Ski Jumping					Total	
Athlete	Event	Points	Rank	Distance 1	Distance 2	Distance 3	Points	Rank	Points	Rank
Hubert Hammerschmied	Individual	154.50	30	58.5	62.0	62.5	202.4	14	356.90	23
Karl Martitsch	Individual	162.00	27	59.0	60.0	61.0	198.2	17	360.20	21
Paul Haslwanter	Individual	163.50	25	DNF	–	–	–	–	DNF	–
Josl Gstrein	Individual	193.50	17	63.5	61.0	59.5	188.2	25	381.70	16

== Skeleton ==
Athlete	Run 1		Run 2		Run 3		Run 4		Run 5		Run 6		Total	
Athlete	Time	Rank	Time	Rank	Time	Rank	Time	Rank	Time	Rank	Time	Rank	Time	Rank
Hugo Kuranda	DNF	–	–	–	–	–	–	–	–	–	–	–	DNF	–

== Ski jumping ==
Athlete	Event	Distance 1	Distance 2	Total points	Rank
Helmut Hadwiger	Normal hill	51.0	56.5	181.4	35
Toni Wieser	Normal hill	59.0	61.5	192.1	28
Gregor Höll	Normal hill	60.0	62.5	195.8	24
Hubert Hammerschmied	Normal hill	61.0	63.0	199.8	19

== Speed skating ==
Men

Event	Athlete	Race	
Event	Athlete	Time	Rank
500 m	Ferdinand Preindl	48.7	41
500 m	Gustav Slanec	47.4	37
1500 m	Ferdinand Preindl	2:38.6	44
1500 m	Gustav Slanec	2:31.9	40
1500 m	Max Stiepl	2:31.2	38
5000 m	Max Stiepl	9:05.0	24
10,000 m	Max Stiepl	19:25.5	10
