= Ice hockey at the 1948 Winter Olympics – Rosters =

The ice hockey team rosters at the 1948 Winter Olympics consisted of the following players:

== Austria ==
Pos.	Name	Birthdate	Team
	Albert Böhm	July 9, 1926 (aged 21)	N/A
D/F	Franz Csöngei	September 13, 1913 (aged 34)	N/A
F	Fritz Demmer	April 17, 1911 (aged 36)	N/A
D	Egon Engel	December 1, 1918 (aged 29)	N/A
F	Walter Feistritzer	April 21, 1920 (aged 27)	N/A
F	Gustav Gross	January 19, 1926 (aged 22)	N/A
F	Adolf Hafner	January 5, 1926 (aged 22)	N/A
G	Fredl Huber	April 15, 1930 (aged 17)	N/A
F	Julius Juhn	December 19, 1921 (aged 26)	N/A
F	Oskar Nowak	March 25, 1913 (aged 34)	N/A
G	Hansjörg Reichel	July 20, 1922 (aged 25)	N/A
F	Hans Schneider	September 14, 1913 (aged 34)	N/A
F	Willibald Stanek	December 4, 1903 (aged 44)	N/A
F	Herbert Ulrich	September 14, 1921 (aged 26)	(Austria) Wiener EV
F	Fritz Walter	February 21, 1924 (aged 23)	N/A
F	Helfried Winger	October 23, 1921 (aged 26)	N/A
D	Rudolf Wurmbrandt	September 20, 1922 (aged 25)	N/A

== Canada ==
Head coach: Frank Boucher

Pos.	Name	Birthdate	Team
G	Murray Dowey	January 3, 1926 (aged 22)	(Canada) Ottawa RCAF Flyers
D	Frank Dunster	March 24, 1921 (aged 26)	(Canada) Ottawa RCAF Flyers
D	Roy Forbes	April 6, 1922 (aged 25)	(Canada) Ottawa RCAF Flyers
F	Orval Gravelle	December 7, 1927 (aged 20)	(Canada) Ottawa RCAF Flyers
F	Patrick Guzzo	October 14, 1914 (aged 33)	(Canada) Ottawa RCAF Flyers
F	Wally Halder	September 15, 1925 (aged 22)	(Canada) Ottawa RCAF Flyers
F	Thomas Hibberd	April 22, 1926 (aged 21)	(Canada) Ottawa RCAF Flyers
G	Ross King	February 19, 1919 (aged 28)	(Canada) Ottawa RCAF Flyers
D	Henri-André Laperrière	June 12, 1925 (aged 22)	(Canada) Ottawa RCAF Flyers
F	Louis Lecompte	July 28, 1914 (aged 33)	(Canada) Ottawa RCAF Flyers
F	George Mara (C)	December 12, 1921 (aged 26)	(Canada) Ottawa RCAF Flyers
F	Albert Renaud	October 20, 1920 (aged 27)	(Canada) Ottawa RCAF Flyers
F	Reginald Schroeter	September 11, 1921 (aged 26)	(Canada) Ottawa RCAF Flyers
F	Irving Taylor	August 13, 1919 (aged 28)	(Canada) Ottawa RCAF Flyers

== Czechoslovakia ==
Head coach: (Canada) Mike Buckna

Pos.	Name	Birthdate	Team
F	Vladimír Bouzek	December 3, 1920 (aged 27)	(Czechoslovakia) Sokol II Třebíč
F	Augustin Bubník	November 21, 1928 (aged 19)	(Czechoslovakia) LTC Praha
F	Jaroslav Drobný	October 12, 1921 (aged 26)	(Czechoslovakia) LTC Praha
D	Přemysl Hajný	December 18, 1925 (aged 22)	(Czechoslovakia) LTC Praha
G	Zdeněk Jarkovský	October 3, 1918 (aged 29)	(Czechoslovakia) 1. CLTK Praha
F	Vladimír Kobranov	September 4, 1927 (aged 20)	(Czechoslovakia) 1. CLTK Praha
F	Stanislav Konopásek	April 18, 1923 (aged 24)	(Czechoslovakia) LTC Praha
G	Bohumil Modrý	September 24, 1916 (aged 31)	(Czechoslovakia) LTC Praha
D	Miloslav Pokorný	October 5, 1926 (aged 21)	(Czechoslovakia) LTC Praha
F	Václav Roziňák	December 7, 1922 (aged 25)	(Czechoslovakia) LTC Praha
D	Miroslav Sláma	August 3, 1917 (aged 30)	(Czechoslovakia) 1. CLTK Praha
F	Karel Stibor	November 5, 1924 (aged 23)	(Czechoslovakia) LTC Praha
D	Vilibald Šťovík	October 9, 1917 (aged 30)	(Czechoslovakia) LTC Praha
F	Ladislav Troják	June 15, 1914 (aged 33)	(Czechoslovakia) LTC Praha
D	Josef Trousílek	March 16, 1918 (aged 29)	(Czechoslovakia) LTC Praha
D	Oldřich Zábrodský	February 28, 1928 (aged 19)	(Czechoslovakia) LTC Praha
F	Vladimír Zábrodský (C)	March 7, 1923 (aged 24)	(Czechoslovakia) LTC Praha

== Great Britain ==
Head coach: (England) Carl Erhardt

Pos.	Name	Birthdate	Team
F	Lennie Baker	September 13, 1918 (aged 29)	(England) Brighton Tigers
D/F	George Baillie	May 19, 1919 (aged 28)	(England) Streatham
F	Jimmy Chappell	March 3, 1915 (aged 32)	(England) Brighton Tigers
F/D	Gerry Davey	September 14, 1914 (aged 33)	(England) Wembley Lions
D	Fred Dunkelman	February 5, 1920 (aged 27)	(England) Harringay Greyhounds
D/F	Art Green	May 12, 1921 (aged 26)	(England) Wembley Lions
F	Frankie Green	November 16, 1918 (aged 29)	(England) Wembley Lions
F	Frank Jardine	March 20, 1924 (aged 23)	(Scotland) Glasgow Mohawks
D	Johnny Murray	January 21, 1923 (aged 25)	(England) Wembley Lions
D/F	Johnny Oxley	December 29, 1922 (aged 25)	(England) Wembley Lions
G	Stan Simon	July 9, 1920 (aged 27)	(England) Wembley Lions
F	Bert Smith	September 6, 1925 (aged 22)	(Scotland) Fife Flyers
F	Archie Stinchcombe (C)	November 17, 1912 (aged 35)	(England) Streatham
F	Tom "Tuck" Syme	May 15, 1928 (aged 19)	(Scotland) Dunfermline Vikings

== Italy ==
Head coach: (Switzerland) Othmar Delnon

Pos.	Name	Birthdate	Team
D	Claudio Apollonio	August 21, 1921 (aged 26)	N/A
D/F	Giancarlo Bassi	February 23, 1926 (aged 21)	N/A
D	Mario Bedogni	November 22, 1923 (aged 24)	(Italy) Diavoli Rossoneri Milano
D	Luigi Bestagini	August 28, 1919 (aged 28)	N/A
F/D	Giancarlo Bucchetti	August 25, 1925 (aged 22)	(Italy) HC Milano
F	Carlo Bulgheroni	June 6, 1928 (aged 19)	(Italy) HC Milano
D/F	Ignazio Dionisi	February 27, 1913 (aged 34)	(Italy) HC Milano
F	Arnaldo Fabris	August 16, 1916 (aged 31)	(Italy) HC Milano
F	Vincenzo Fardella	May 8, 1926 (aged 21)	(Italy) HC Milano
F/D	Aldo Federici	September 6, 1920 (aged 27)	(Italy) HC Milano
F	Umberto Gerli	December 4, 1925 (aged 22)	(Italy) HC Milano
F/D	Dino Innocenti (C)	November 6, 1913 (aged 34)	(Italy) HC Milano
G	Constanzo Mangini	June 11, 1918 (aged 29)	(Italy) HC Milano
F	Dino Menardi	August 23, 1923 (aged 24)	N/A
F	Otto Rauth	January 22, 1914 (aged 34)	(Switzerland) Rotweiss Basel
D	Franco Rossi	January 2, 1916 (aged 32)	(Italy) HC Milano
G	Gianantonio Zopegni	March 8, 1915 (aged 32)	(Italy) HC Milano

== Poland ==
Head coach: Zbigniew Kasprzak

Pos.	Name	Birthdate	Team
D	Henryk Bromowicz	February 22, 1924 (aged 23)	(Poland) Siemianowiczanka
F	Mieczysław Burda	April 19, 1916 (aged 31)	(Poland) Cracovia Kraków
F/D	Stefan Csorich	September 25, 1921 (aged 26)	(Poland) KTH Krynica
D/F	Zygmunt Ginter	January 12, 1918 (aged 30)	(Poland) Legia Warszawa
F/D	Alfred Gansiniec	October 29, 1919 (aged 28)	(Poland) Sila Giszowiec
D/F	Tomasz Jansiński	March 23, 1916 (aged 31)	(Poland) Wisla Kraków
D	Mieczysław Kasprzycki (C)	December 13, 1910 (aged 37)	(Poland) Cracovia Kraków
F	Adam Kowalski	December 19, 1912 (aged 35)	(Poland) Cracovia Kraków
F	Eugeniusz Lewacki	January 24, 1926 (aged 22)	(Poland) KTH Krynica
G	Jan Maciejko	January 2, 1913 (aged 35)	(Poland) Cracovia Kraków
F	Czesław Marchewczyk	October 1, 1912 (aged 35)	(Poland) Cracovia Kraków
F	Mieczysław Palus	August 31, 1921 (aged 26)	(Poland) Legia Warszawa
G	Henryk Przeździecki	February 20, 1909 (aged 38)	(Poland) Legia Warszawa
F	Hilary Skarżyński	June 18, 1925 (aged 22)	(Poland) Siemianowiczanka
D	Maksymilian Więcek	September 18, 1920 (aged 27)	(Poland) Cracovia Kraków
F	Ernest Ziaja	April 11, 1919 (aged 28)	(Poland) Siemianowiczanka

== Sweden ==
Head coach: Sven Bergqvist

Pos.	Name	Birthdate	Team
F	Stig Emanuel Andersson	October 16, 1914 (aged 33)	(Sweden) Atlas Diesels IF
D/F	Åke Andersson	June 8, 1918 (aged 29)	(Sweden) Hammarby IF
F	Stig Carlsson	January 17, 1924 (aged 24)	(Sweden) Södertälje SK
F	Åke Ericson	May 16, 1913 (aged 34)	(Sweden) IK Göta
F	Rolf Ericson-Hemlin	November 18, 1918 (aged 29)	(Sweden) Södertälje SK
F/D	Svante Granlund	February 1, 1921 (aged 26)	(Sweden) AIK
G	Arne Johansson	February 25, 1915 (aged 32)	(Sweden) Södertälje SK
D	Rune Johansson	August 13, 1920 (aged 27)	(Sweden) Hammarby IF
D	Gunnar Landelius	March 20, 1918 (aged 29)	(Sweden) Hammarby IF
F	Klas Lindström	October 27, 1920 (aged 27)	(Sweden) AIK
F	Lars Ljungman	April 1, 1918 (aged 29)	(Sweden) AIK
F	Holger Nurmela	October 28, 1920 (aged 27)	(Sweden) Hammarby IF
F	Bror Pettersson	January 31, 1924 (aged 23)	(Sweden) Hammarby IF
F	Rolf Pettersson	January 27, 1926 (aged 22)	(Sweden) Hammarby IF
G	Kurt Svanberg	September 26, 1913 (aged 34)	(Sweden) AIK
D	Sven Thunman	April 20, 1920 (aged 27)	(Sweden) Södertälje SK

== Switzerland ==
Head coach: (Canada) Wyn Cook

Pos.	Name	Birthdate	Team
G	Hans Bänninger	March 17, 1924 (aged 23)	(Switzerland) Zürcher SC
F	Alfred Bieler	April 18, 1923 (aged 24)	(Switzerland) Zürcher SC
D	Heinrich Boller	September 6, 1921 (aged 26)	(Switzerland) Zürcher SC
F	Ferdinand Cattini	November 27, 1916 (aged 31)	(Switzerland) HC Davos
F	Hans Cattini (C)	January 24, 1914 (aged 34)	(Switzerland) Montchoisi Lausanne HC
F	Hans Dürst	June 28, 1921 (aged 26)	(Switzerland) HC Davos
F/D	Walter Dürst	February 28, 1927 (aged 20)	(Switzerland) HC Davos
D	Emil Handschin	March 19, 1928 (aged 19)	(Switzerland) Rotweiss Basel
D/F	Werner Lohrer	March 4, 1917 (aged 30)	(Switzerland) EHC Arosa
F	Heini Lohrer	June 29, 1918 (aged 29)	(Switzerland) Zürcher SC
G	Reto Perl	November 23, 1923 (aged 24)	(Switzerland) HC Davos
F	Gebhard Poltera	December 14, 1923 (aged 24)	(Switzerland) EHC Arosa
F	Ulrich Poltera	July 17, 1922 (aged 25)	(Switzerland) EHC Arosa
D/F	Beat Rüedi	February 19, 1920 (aged 27)	(Switzerland) HC Davos
F	Otto Schubiger	January 6, 1925 (aged 23)	(Switzerland) Zürcher SC
F	Bibi Torriani (C)	January 10, 1911 (aged 37)	(Switzerland) HC Davos
F	Hans-Martin Trepp	November 9, 1922 (aged 25)	(Switzerland) EHC Arosa

== United States ==
Head coach: John Garrison

Pos.	Name	Birthdate	Team
F	Robert Baker	December 21, 1926 (aged 21)	(United States) Thief River Falls Thieves
F	Ruben Bjorkman	February 27, 1929 (aged 18)	(United States) Roseau High School
F	Bob Boeser	June 30, 1927 (aged 20)	(United States) St. John's Johnnies
F	Bruce Cunliffe	August 19, 1925 (aged 22)	(United States) Dartmouth Indians
F	Jack Garrity	April 1, 1926 (aged 21)	(United States) Boston University
F	Donald Geary	July 10, 1926 (aged 21)	N/A
G	Goodwin Harding (C)	December 11, 1920 (aged 27)	(United States) Harvard Crimson
D	Jack Kirrane	August 20, 1928 (aged 19)	(United States) Boston Olympics
F	Bruce Mather	July 25, 1926 (aged 21)	(United States) Dartmouth Indians
D	Al Opsahl	September 27, 1924 (aged 23)	(United States) Minnesota Golden Gophers
F	Fred Pearson	March 23, 1923 (aged 24)	(United States) Yale Bulldogs
D	Stanton Priddy	February 26, 1921 (aged 26)	(United States) Dartmouth Indians
F	Jack Riley	June 15, 1920 (aged 27)	(United States) Dartmouth Indians
F	Joe Riley	December 14, 1923 (aged 24)	(United States) Dartmouth Indians
F	Ralph Warburton	February 7, 1924 (aged 23)	(United States) Dartmouth Indians

== Sources ==
- Duplacey, James (1998). Total Hockey: The official encyclopedia of the National Hockey League. Total Sports. ISBN 0-8362-7114-9.
- Podnieks, Andrew (2010). IIHF Media Guide & Record Book 2011. Moydart Pres.
- Hockey Hall Of Fame page on the 1948 Olympics
- Wallechinsky, David (1988). The Complete Book of the Olympics. Penguin Books. pp. 614. ISBN 0-14-010771-1.
