= Nordic combined at the 1948 Winter Olympics =

Nordic combined at the V Olympic Winter Games
- Venue: Olympiaschanze St. Moritz (ski jumping); Around the hills of St. Moritz (cross-country skiing)
- Dates: 31 January-1 February 1948
- Competitors: 39 from 13 nations
- Winning Score: 448.80

Medalists
1st place, gold medalist(s)		Heikki Hasu	Finland
2nd place, silver medalist(s)		Martti Huhtala	Finland
3rd place, bronze medalist(s)		Sven Israelsson	Sweden

Nordic combined at the 1948 Winter Olympics consisted of one event, held from 31 January to 1 February. The ski jumping portion took place at Olympiaschanze St. Moritz, while the cross-country portion took place around the hills of St. Moritz.

== Medal summary ==
=== Medal table ===
Rank	Nation	Gold	Silver	Bronze	Total
1	Finland	1	1	0	2
2	Sweden	0	0	1	1
Totals (2 entries)		1	1	1	3

Norway, which had won every previous Olympic medal in Nordic combined, were stunned to see Finland and Sweden split the three medals in St. Moritz.

=== Events ===
Event	Gold		Silver		Bronze	
Individual	Heikki Hasu; Finland	448.80	Martti Huhtala; Finland	433.65	Sven Israelsson; Sweden	433.40

== Individual ==
The 18 kilometre cross-country race was used to determine the cross-country scores for the Nordic combined, which did not have a separate ski race. 39 competitors in that race went on to compete in the ski jumping, with each jumper taking three attempts, and the top two counting for points. The athlete with the highest combined points score was awarded the gold medal.

Rank	Name	Country	Cross-country			Ski Jumping					Total
Rank	Name	Country	Time	Points	Rank	Jump 1	Jump 2	Jump 3	Total	Rank	Total
1st place, gold medalist(s)	Heikki Hasu	Finland	1:16:43	240.00	39	~~57.0~~	61.5	64.0	208.8	8	448.80
2nd place, silver medalist(s)	Martti Huhtala	Finland	1:19:28	224.15	38	62.0	~~61.0~~	61.5	209.5	6	433.65
3rd place, bronze medalist(s)	Sven Israelsson	Sweden	1:21:44	211.50	36	67.5	~~66.0~~	67.0	221.9	1	433.40
4	Niklaus Stump	Switzerland	1:22:15	208.50	33	65.5	63.5	~~60.0~~	213.0	5	421.50
5	Olavi Sihvonen	Finland	1:22:26	207.00	32	~~60.0~~	65.0	~~60.0~~	209.2	7	416.20
6	Eilert Dahl	Norway	1:22:52	205.50	30	~~62.0~~	62.5	63.0	208.8	8	414.30
7	Pauli Salonen	Finland	1:22:28	207.00	31	63.0	62.0	~~60.5~~	206.3	10	413.30
8	Olaf Dufseth	Norway	1:21:50	211.50	35	61.0	~~59.0~~	61.0	201.1	16	412.60
9	Erik Elmsäter	Sweden	1:22:12	208.95	34	~~56.0~~	61.5	58.0	202.0	15	410.95
10	Clas Haraldsson	Sweden	1:24:21	197.35	25	~~63.5~~	66.0	66.0	213.4	4	410.75
11	Olav Odden	Norway	1:21:35	212.25	37	59.0	~~53.5~~	55.5	196.9	19	409.15
12	Kåre Østerdal	Norway	1:24:20	198.00	26	~~55.0~~	62.0	61.0	206.2	11	404.20
13	Alfons Supersaxo	Switzerland	1:24:29	196.50	24	63.0	~~57.0~~	61.5	203.9	13	400.40
14	Alfredo Prucker	Italy	1:23:26	202.50	29	~~51.0~~	59.5	56.0	191.5	22	394.00
15	Rizzieri Rodeghiero	Italy	1:24:12	198.00	27	57.0	58.0	~~56.0~~	190.8	23	388.80
16	Josl Gstrein	Austria	1:25:04	193.50	23	63.5	61.0	~~59.5~~	188.2	25	381.70
17	Theo Allenbach	Switzerland	1:23:54	199.50	28	52.5	52.0	~~50.0~~	176.6	32	376.10
18	Gottlieb Perren	Switzerland	1:26:27	186.00	20	~~56.0~~	57.5	56.5	187.8	26	373.80
19	René Jeandel	France	1:25:57	189.00	21	~~52.0~~	54.0	56.5	182.1	28	371.10
20	Stefan Dziedzic	Poland	1:25:33	190.50	22	~~52.0~~	54.5	~~52.0~~	177.1	31	367.60
21	Karl Martitsch	Austria	1:31:19	162.00	13	~~59.0~~	60.0	61.0	198.2	17	360.20
22	Józef Daniel Krzeptowski	Poland	1:31:05	162.00	14	58.0	~~57.0~~	60.5	197.8	18	359.80
23	Hubert Hammerschmied	Austria	1:32:47	154.50	10	~~58.5~~	62.0	62.5	202.4	14	356.90
24	Tone Razinger	Yugoslavia	1:28:24	176.25	17	53.5	~~51.5~~	55.5	176.2	33	352.45
25	Tadeusz Kwapień	Poland	1:27:55	178.50	19	~~47.0~~	52.5	51.0	173.7	34	352.20
26	Corey Engen	United States	1:37:24	132.00	6	65.5	~~59.0~~	64.0	214.8	3	346.80
27	Don Johnson	United States	1:32:03	157.50	12	57.0	~~56.5~~	59.0	187.6	27	345.10
28	Alberto Tassotti	Italy	1:28:16	177.00	18	46.5	52.0	~~42.0~~	165.1	36	342.10
29	Gordy Wren	United States	1:40:12	120.00	4	66.5	68.5	~~66.0~~	220.2	2	340.20
30	Walter Jeandel	France	1:34:19	147.00	9	60.5	~~59.0~~	59.5	192.6	21	339.60
31	Jaroslav Kadavý	Czechoslovakia	1:32:17	157.50	11	~~51.5~~	55.0	55.5	181.1	29	338.60
32	Bohumil Kosour	Czechoslovakia	1:29:37	169.50	16	~~44.5~~	47.5	48.5	159.0	37	328.50
33	Ralph Townsend, Jr.	United States	1:37:12	138.00	7	~~54.5~~	61.0	58.0	188.7	24	326.70
34	Leopold Tajner	Poland	1:38:45	126.00	5	61.5	58.0	~~55.0~~	195.5	20	321.50
35	Jaroslav Lukeš	Czechoslovakia	1:41:00	115.50	3	63.5	~~62.0~~	65.0	205.4	12	320.90
36	František Šimůnek	Czechoslovakia	1:35:21	142.50	8	51.0	~~50.0~~	52.0	169.8	35	312.30
37	Bill Irwin	Canada	1:44:43	99.00	1	~~51.0~~	~~51.0~~	51.5	181.0	30	280.00
38	Nikola Delev	Bulgaria	1:43:29	105.00	2	~~42.0~~	45.0	48.0	157.1	38	262.10
-	Paul Haslwanter	Austria	1:31:00	163.50	15	-	-	-	DNS	-	-

== Participating National Olympic Committees ==
Thirteen nations participated in Nordic combined at the St. Moritz Games. Bulgaria and France made their Olympic Nordic combined debuts.

- Austria (4)
- Bulgaria (1)
- Canada (1)
- Finland (4)
- France (2)
- Italy (3)
- Norway (4)
- Poland (4)
- Switzerland (4)
- Sweden (3)
- Czechoslovakia (4)
- United States (4)
- Yugoslavia (1)
