= Cross-country skiing at the 1948 Winter Olympics – Men's 18 kilometre =

Men's 18 kilometre at the V Olympic Winter Games
- Cross-country skiing
- Dates: 31 January 1948
- Competitors: 84 from 15 nations
- Winning time: 1:13:50

Medalists
1st place, gold medalist(s)		Martin Lundström	Sweden
2nd place, silver medalist(s)		Nils Östensson	Sweden
3rd place, bronze medalist(s)		Gunnar Eriksson	Sweden

The 18 kilometre cross-country skiing event was part of the cross-country skiing at the 1948 Winter Olympics programme. It was the fifth appearance of the event. The competition was held on Saturday, 31 January 1948. Eighty-four cross-country skiers from 15 nations competed.

== Medalists ==
Gold	Silver	Bronze
Martin Lundström; Sweden	Nils Östensson; Sweden	Gunnar Eriksson; Sweden

== Results ==
Place	Competitor	Time
1	Martin Lundström (SWE)	1'13:50
2	Nils Östensson (SWE)	1'14:22
3	Gunnar Eriksson (SWE)	1'16:06
4	Heikki Hasu (FIN)	1'16:43
5	Nils Karlsson (SWE)	1'16:54
6	Sauli Rytky (FIN)	1'18:10
7	August Kiuru (FIN)	1'18:25
8	Teuvo Laukkanen (FIN)	1'18:51
9	Olav Hagen (NOR)	1'19:05
10	Martti Huhtala (FIN)	1'19:28
11	Benoît Carrara (FRA)	1'20:03
12	Eero Rautiola (FIN)	1'20:18
13	Olav Økern (NOR)	1'20:37
14	Olav Odden (NOR)	1'21:35
15	Erling Evensen (NOR)	1'21:40
16	Sven Israelsson (SWE)	1'21:44
17	Reidar Nyborg (NOR)	1'21:47
18	Olaf Dufseth (NOR)	1'21:50
19	Erik Elmsäter (SWE)	1'22:12
20	Edi Schild (SUI)	1'22:15
20	Niklaus Stump (SUI)	1'22:15
22	Severino Compagnoni (ITA)	1'22:21
23	Olavi Sihvonen (FIN)	1'22:26
24	Pauli Salonen (FIN)	1'22:28
25	Max Müller (SUI)	1'22:40
26	Robert Zurbriggen (SUI)	1'22:51
27	Eilert Dahl (NOR)	1'22:52
28	Karl Rafreider (AUT)	1'23:19
29	Alfredo Prucker (ITA)	1'23:26
30	Theo Allenbach (SUI)	1'24:12
30	Rizzieri Rodeghiero (ITA)	1'24:12
32	Kaare Østerdahl (NOR)	1'24:20
33	Clas Haraldsson (SWE)	1'24:21
34	Alfons Supersaxo (SUI)	1'24:29
35	Cristiano Rodeghiero (ITA)	1'24:34
36	Josl Gstrein (AUT)	1'25:04
37	Marius Mora (FRA)	1'25:06
38	Stefan Dziedzic (POL)	1'25:33
39	Engelbert Hundertpfund (AUT)	1'25:41
40	Jaroslav Cardal (TCH)	1'25:44
41	Karl Bricker (SUI)	1'25:47
42	René Jeandel (FRA)	1'25:57
43	Gottlieb Perren (SUI)	1'26:27
44	André Buffard (FRA)	1'27:18
45	Matthias Noichl (AUT)	1'27:34
46	Josef Deutschmann (AUT)	1'27:43
47	Tadeusz Kwapień (POL)	1'27:55
48	Paul Bouveret (FRA)	1'28:07
49	András Harangvölgyi (HUN)	1'28:10
50	Alberto Tassotti (ITA)	1'28:16
51	Tone Razinger (YUG)	1'28:24
52	Arcangelo Chiocchetti (ITA)	1'28:36
53	Matevž Kordež (YUG)	1'28:37
54	Vincenzo Perruchon (ITA)	1'28:50
55	Jože Knific (YUG)	1'29:01
56	Tone Pogačnik (YUG)	1'29:08
57	Imre Beták (HUN)	1'29:24
58	Vít Fousek Sr. (TCH)	1'29:37
59	Bohumil Kosour (TCH)	1'29:37
60	Jaroslav Zajíček (TCH)	1'29:44
61	Paul Haslwanter (AUT)	1'31:00
62	Józef Daniel Krzeptowski (POL)	1'31:05
63	Štefan Kovalčík (TCH)	1'31:06
64	Karl Martitsch (AUT)	1'31:19
65	Chummy Broomhall (USA)	1'31:40
66	Don Johnson (USA)	1'32:03
67	Jaroslav Kadavý (TCH)	1'32:47
68	Hubert Hammerschmied (AUT)	1'32:47
69	Alojz Klančnik (YUG)	1'33:02
70	Stanisław Bukowski (POL)	1'34:17
71	Walter Jeandel (FRA)	1'34:19
72	František Šimůnek (TCH)	1'35:21
73	Tom Dennie (CAN)	1'35:41
74	Ralph Townsend (USA)	1'37:12
75	Corey Engen (USA)	1'37:24
76	Leopold Tajner (POL)	1'38:45
77	Gordon Wren (USA)	1'40:12
78	Jaroslav Lukeš (TCH)	1'41:00
79	Christof Frommelt (LIE)	1'42:35
80	Nikola Delev (BUL)	1'43:29
81	Wilbur Irwin (CAN)	1'44:43
82	Egon Matt (LIE)	1'48:41
83	Erwin Jehle (LIE)	1'49:26
–	Georgi Doykov (BUL)	DNF
