= Italy at the 1948 Winter Olympics =

- IOC code: ITA
- NOC: Italian National Olympic Committee
- Website: www.coni.it (in Italian)

in St. Moritz
- Competitors: 57 (54 men, 3 women) in 9 sports
- Flag bearer: Vittorio Chierroni
- Medals Ranked 10th: Gold 1 Silver 0 Bronze 0 Total 1

Winter Olympics appearances (overview)
- 1924; 1928; 1932; 1936; 1948; 1952; 1956; 1960; 1964; 1968; 1972; 1976; 1980; 1984; 1988; 1992; 1994; 1998; 2002; 2006; 2010; 2014; 2018; 2022; 2026

Italy competed at the 1948 Winter Olympics in St. Moritz, Switzerland. Nino Bibbia won the nation's first medal at the Winter Games.

== Medalists ==
Medal	Name	Sport	Event
Gold	Nino Bibbia	Skeleton	Men's individual

== Alpine skiing ==
Men

Athlete	Event	Race 1		Race 2		Total	
Athlete	Event	Time	Rank	Time	Rank	Time	Rank
Roberto Lacedelli	Downhill					DNF	–
Zeno Colò	Downhill					DNF	–
Eugenio Bonnico	Downhill					3:15.4	32
Vittorio Chierroni	Downhill					3:10.0	21
Carlo Gartner	Downhill					3:02.4	6
Silvio Alverà	Downhill					3:02.4	6
Roberto Lacedelli	Slalom	DNF	–	–	–	DNF	–
Vittorio Chierroni	Slalom	1:27.0	36	1:05.5	7	2:32.5	30
Zeno Colò	Slalom	1:13.3	17	1:05.7	8	2:19.0	14
Silvio Alverà	Slalom	1:07.4	1	1:05.8	9	2:13.2	4

Men's combined

The downhill part of this event was held along with the main medal event of downhill skiing. For athletes competing in both events, the same time was used (see table above for the results). The slalom part of the event was held separate from the main medal event of slalom skiing (included in table below).

Athlete	Slalom			Total (downhill + slalom)	
Athlete	Time 1	Time 2	Rank	Points	Rank
Silvio Alverà	1:15.3	1:09.6	11	8.71	5
Vittorio Chierroni	1:10.8	1:07.3	3	9.69	7

Women

Athlete	Event	Race 1		Race 2		Total	
Athlete	Event	Time	Rank	Time	Rank	Time	Rank
Renata Carraretto	Downhill					2:59.1	32
Celina Seghi	Downhill					2:31.1	4
Celina Seghi	Slalom	1:13.2	21	58.3	6	2:11.5	14
Renata Carraretto	Slalom	1:09.2	17	1:10.7	19	2:19.9	18

Women's combined

The downhill part of this event was held along with the main medal event of downhill skiing. For athletes competing in both events, the same time was used (see table above for the results). The slalom part of the event was held separate from the main medal event of slalom skiing (included in table below).

Athlete	Slalom			Total (downhill + slalom)	
Athlete	Time 1	Time 2	Rank	Points	Rank
Renata Carraretto	1:14.1	1:12.0	21	33.58	22
Celina Seghi	1:08.2	1:01.5	7	7.46	4

== Bobsleigh ==
Sled	Athletes	Event	Run 1		Run 2		Run 3		Run 4		Total	
Sled	Athletes	Event	Time	Rank	Time	Rank	Time	Rank	Time	Rank	Time	Rank
ITA-1	Nino Bibbia; Edilberto Campadese	Two-man	1:25.0	5	1:25.0	8	1:23.8	6	1:24.2	6	5:38.0	6
ITA-2	Mario Vitali; Dario Poggi	Two-man	1:25.1	6	1:25.1	11	1:24.0	7	1:24.4	8	5:38.6	8

Sled	Athletes	Event	Run 1		Run 2		Run 3		Run 4		Total	
Sled	Athletes	Event	Time	Rank	Time	Rank	Time	Rank	Time	Rank	Time	Rank
ITA-1	Nino Bibbia; Giancarlo Ronchetti; Edilberto Campadese; Luigi Cavalieri	Four-man	1:18.2	7	1:20.8	3	1:22.1	6	1:21.9	4	5:23.0	6
ITA-2	Nino Rovelli; Enrico Airoldi; Vittorio Folonari; Remo Airoldi	Four-man	1:19.8	10	1:22.8	11	1:23.2	9	1:24.4	9	5:30.2	11

== Cross-country skiing ==
Men

Event	Athlete	Race	
Event	Athlete	Time	Rank
18 km	Vincenzo Perruchon	1'28:50	54
18 km	Arcangelo Chiocchetti	1'28:36	52
18 km	Alberto Tassotti	1'28:16	50
18 km	Cristiano Rodeghiero	1'24:34	35
18 km	Rizzieri Rodeghiero	1'24:12	31
18 km	Alfredo Prucker	1'23:26	29
18 km	Severino Compagnoni	1'22:21	22
50 km	Stefano Sommariva	DNF	–
50 km	Victor Borghi	DNF	–
50 km	Silvio Confortola	4'31:36	18
50 km	Cristiano Rodeghiero	4'24:12	13

Men's 4 x 10 km relay

Athletes	Race	
Athletes	Time	Rank
Vincenzo Perruchon; Silvio Confortola; Rizzieri Rodeghiero; Severino Compagnoni	2'51:00	6

== Figure skating ==
Men

Athlete	CF	FS	Points	Places	Final rank
Carlo Fassi	16	15	145.966	135	15

Women

Athlete	CF	FS	Points	Places	Final rank
Grazia Barcellona	25	24	122.211	218	24

Pairs

Athletes	Points	Places	Final rank
Grazia Barcellona; Carlo Fassi	9.263	121.5	13

== Ice hockey ==
The tournament was run in a round-robin format with nine teams participating.

	Pld	W	L	T	GF	GA	Pts
Canada	8	7	0	1	69	5	15
Czechoslovakia	8	7	0	1	80	18	15
Switzerland	8	6	2	0	67	21	12
Sweden	8	4	4	0	55	28	8
Great Britain	8	3	5	0	39	47	6
Poland	8	2	6	0	29	97	4
Austria	8	1	7	0	33	77	2
Italy 8th	8	0	8	0	24	156	0
United States *	8	5	3	0	86	33	10

* United States team was disqualified. Only eight teams are officially ranked.

- Czechoslovakia 22-3 Italy
- Switzerland 16-0 Italy
- USA 31-1 Italy
- Canada 21-1 Italy
- Poland 13-7 Italy
- Austria 16-5 Italy
- Sweden 23-0 Italy
- United Kingdom 14-7 Italy

Contestants; Claudio Apollonio; Giancarlo Bassi; Mario Bedogni; Luigi Bestagini; Giancarlo Bucchetti; Carlo Bulgheroni; Ignazio Dionisi; Arnaldo Fabris; Vincenzo Fardella; Aldo Federici; Umberto Gerli; Dino Innocenti; Constanzo Mangini; Dino Menardi; Otto Rauth; Franco Rossi; Gianantonio Zopegni

== Nordic combined ==
Events:

- 18 km cross-country skiing
- normal hill ski jumping

The cross-country skiing part of this event was combined with the main medal event, meaning that athletes competing here were skiing for two disciplines at the same time. Details can be found above in this article, in the cross-country skiing section.

The ski jumping (normal hill) event was held separate from the main medal event of ski jumping, results can be found in the table below. Athletes would perform three jumps, of which the two best jumps (distance and form) were counted.

Athlete	Event	Cross-country		Ski Jumping					Total	
Athlete	Event	Points	Rank	Distance 1	Distance 2	Distance 3	Points	Rank	Points	Rank
Alberto Tassotti	Individual	177.00	22	46.5	52.0	42.0	165.1	36	342.10	28
Rizzieri Rodeghiero	Individual	198.00	13	57.0	58.0	56.0	190.8	23	388.80	15
Alfredo Prucker	Individual	202.50	11	51.0	59.5	56.0	191.5	22	394.00	14

== Skeleton ==
Athlete	Run 1		Run 2		Run 3		Run 4		Run 5		Run 6		Total	
Athlete	Time	Rank	Time	Rank	Time	Rank	Time	Rank	Time	Rank	Time	Rank	Time	Rank
Nino Bibbia	48.0	4	47.6	2	47.6	1	59.5	1	1:00.2	1	1:00.3	1	5:23.2	1st place, gold medalist(s)

== Ski jumping ==
Athlete	Event	Distance 1	Distance 2	Total points	Rank
Aldo Trivella	Normal hill	41.5	59.0	176.6	38
Igino Rizzi	Normal hill	57.0 (fall)	57.0	131.7	45
Bruno Da Col	Normal hill	65.5	66.0	201.2	18

== Speed skating ==
Men

Event	Athlete	Race	
Event	Athlete	Time	Rank
500 m	Giorgio Cattaneo	47.2	36
500 m	Enrico Musolino	46.5	32
1500 m	Guido Caroli	2:30.9	36
1500 m	Giorgio Cattaneo	2:30.5	34
1500 m	Enrico Musolino	2:30.0	32
5000 m	Fernando Alloni	9:36.3	37
5000 m	Enrico Musolino	9:32.3	36
5000 m	Guido Caroli	9:21.3	31
