= Finland at the 1948 Winter Olympics =

- IOC code: FIN
- NOC: Finnish Olympic Committee
- Website: sport.fi/olympiakomitea (in Finnish and Swedish)

in St. Moritz
- Competitors: 24 (men) in 5 sports
- Flag bearer: Pekka Vanninen
- Medals Ranked 8th: Gold 1 Silver 3 Bronze 2 Total 6

Winter Olympics appearances (overview)
- 1924; 1928; 1932; 1936; 1948; 1952; 1956; 1960; 1964; 1968; 1972; 1976; 1980; 1984; 1988; 1992; 1994; 1998; 2002; 2006; 2010; 2014; 2018; 2022; 2026

Finland competed at the 1948 Winter Olympics in St. Moritz, Switzerland.

== Medalists ==
Medal	Name	Sport	Event
Gold	Heikki Hasu	Nordic Combined	Men's individual
Silver	August Kiuru; Teuvo Laukkanen; Sauli Rytky; Lauri Silvennoinen	Cross-country skiing	Men's 4 x 10 km relay
Silver	Martti Huhtala	Nordic combined	Men's individual
Silver	Lassi Parkkinen	Speed skating	Men's 10,000m
Bronze	Benjamin Vanninen	Cross-country skiing	Men's 50 km
Bronze	Pentti Lammio	Speed skating	Men's 10,000m

== Alpine skiing ==
Men

Athlete	Event	Race 1		Race 2		Total	
Athlete	Event	Time	Rank	Time	Rank	Time	Rank
Aimo Vartiainen	Downhill					3:36.4	53
Pentti Alonen	Downhill					3:22.3	39
Pentti Alonen	Slalom	1:18.1	26	1:17.7	36	2:35.8	32
Aimo Vartiainen	Slalom	1:14.0	20	1:11.0	26	2:25.0	21

Men's combined

The downhill part of this event was held along with the main medal event of downhill skiing. For athletes competing in both events, the same time was used (see table above for the results). The slalom part of the event was held separate from the main medal event of slalom skiing (included in table below).

Athlete	Slalom			Total (downhill + slalom)	
Athlete	Time 1	Time 2	Rank	Points	Rank
Aimo Vartiainen	–	–	–	DSQ	–
Pentti Alonen	1:29.0	1:11.2	26	26.38	28

== Cross-country skiing ==
Men

Event	Athlete	Race	
Event	Athlete	Time	Rank
18 km	Pauli Salonen	1'22:28	24
18 km	Olavi Sihvonen	1'22:26	23
18 km	Eero Rautiola	1'20:18	12
18 km	Martti Huhtala	1'19:28	10
18 km	Teuvo Laukkanen	1'18:51	8
18 km	August Kiuru	1'18:25	7
18 km	Sauli Rytky	1'18:10	6
18 km	Heikki Hasu	1'16:43	4
50 km	Martti Sipilä	DNF	–
50 km	Pekka Kuvaja	4'10:02	7
50 km	Pekka Vanninen	3'57:58	4
50 km	Benjamin Vanninen	3'57:28	3rd place, bronze medalist(s)

Men's 4 x 10 km relay

Athletes	Race	
Athletes	Time	Rank
Lauri Silvennoinen; Teuvo Laukkanen; Sauli Rytky; August Kiuru	2'41:06	2nd place, silver medalist(s)

== Nordic combined ==
Events:

- 18 km cross-country skiing
- normal hill ski jumping

The cross-country skiing part of this event was combined with the main medal event, meaning that athletes competing here were skiing for two disciplines at the same time. Details can be found above in this article, in the cross-country skiing section.

The ski jumping (normal hill) event was held separate from the main medal event of ski jumping, results can be found in the table below. Athletes would perform three jumps, of which the two best jumps (distance and form) were counted.

Athlete	Event	Cross-country		Ski Jumping					Total	
Athlete	Event	Points	Rank	Distance 1	Distance 2	Distance 3	Points	Rank	Points	Rank
Pauli Salonen	Individual	207.00	9	63.0	62.0 (fall)	60.5	206.3	10	413.30	7
Olavi Sihvonen	Individual	207.00	8	60.0	65.0	60.0	209.2	7	416.20	5
Martti Huhtala	Individual	224.15	2	62.0	61.0	61.5	209.5	6	433.65	2nd place, silver medalist(s)
Heikki Hasu	Individual	240.00	1	57.0	61.5	64.0	208.8	8	448.80	1st place, gold medalist(s)

== Ski jumping ==
Athlete	Event	Distance 1	Distance 2	Total points	Rank
Erkki Rajala	Normal hill	DNF	–	DNF	–
Leo Laakso	Normal hill	66.0	69.5	221.7	6
Aatto Pietikäinen	Normal hill	69.0	68.0	215.4	8
Matti Pietikäinen	Normal hill	69.5	69.0	224.6	4

== Speed skating ==
Men

Event	Athlete	Race	
Event	Athlete	Time	Rank
500 m	Kalevi Laitinen	45.3	17
500 m	Lassi Parkkinen	45.2	16
500 m	Antero Ojala	44.8	14
500 m	Keijo Lehdikkö	44.7	13
1500 m	Pentti Lammio	2:23.9	21
1500 m	Antero Ojala	2:21.4	12
1500 m	Kalevi Laitinen	2:20.3	7
1500 m	Lassi Parkkinen	2:19.6	4
5000 m	Antero Ojala	9:06.2	26
5000 m	Kalevi Laitinen	8:53.0	15
5000 m	Lassi Parkkinen	8:45.0	9
5000 m	Pentti Lammio	8:40.7	8
10,000 m	Kalevi Laitinen	DNF	–
10,000 m	Pentti Lammio	17:42.7	3rd place, bronze medalist(s)
10,000 m	Lassi Parkkinen	17:36.0	2nd place, silver medalist(s)
