= Oskar Nowak =

Oskar Nowak may refer to:

- Oskar Nowak (hockey), Austrian ice hockey and field hockey player
- Oskar Nowak (footballer), Polish footballer
