= Leonard Baker (disambiguation) =

Leonard Baker may refer to:

- Len Baker (1897–1979) English footballer also known as Lawrie Baker
- Lennie Baker (ice hockey) (1918–2008), British ice hockey player
- Leonard Baker (1931–1984), American writer
