= Chiocchetti =

Chiocchetti is an Italian surname. Notable people with the surname include:

- Arcangelo Chiocchetti (1921–2001), Italian cross-country skier
- Renzo Chiocchetti (1945–2020), Italian cross-country skier
