= Matti Pietikäinen =

Finnish ski jumper

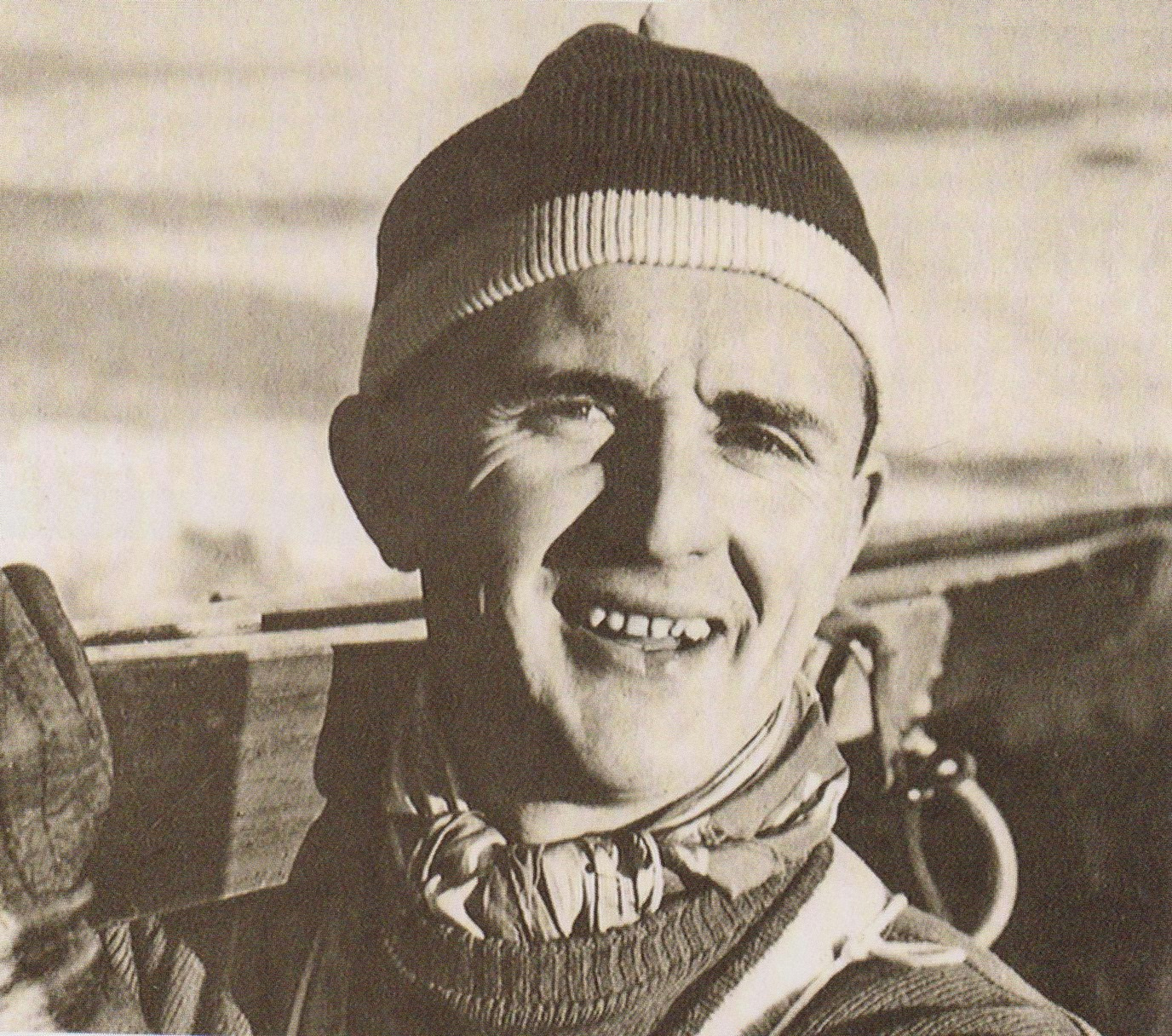

Personal information
- Born: 29 October 1927 Kuopio, Finland
- Died: 15 November 1967 (aged 40)

Sport
- Sport: Ski jumping
- Club: Puijon Hiihtoseura
Medal record
Representing Finland
World Championships
Gold medal – first place	1954 Falun	Individual large hill

Matti Pietikäinen (29 October 1927 – 15 November 1967) was a Finnish ski jumper who won a world title in 1954 and placed fourth at the 1948 Winter Olympics, four places above his brother Aatto.
