= Kalevi Laitinen =

Kalevi Laitinen may refer to:

- Kalevi Laitinen (gymnast)
- Kalevi Laitinen (speed skater)
