= Georgi Doykov =

Bulgarian cross-country skier (born 1924)

Personal information
- Nationality: Bulgarian
- Born: 3 April 1924

Sport
- Sport: Cross-country skiing

Georgi Doykov (Bulgarian: Георги Дойков, born 3 April 1924) was a Bulgarian cross-country skier. He competed in the men's 18 kilometre event at the 1948 Winter Olympics.
