= Imre Beták =

Hungarian cross-country skier (1922–1997)

Personal information
- Nationality: Hungarian
- Born: 21 November 1922; Balatonvilágos, Hungary
- Died: 9 November 1997 (aged 74); Budapest, Hungary

Sport
- Sport: Cross-country skiing

Imre Beták (21 December 1922 – 9 November 1997) was a Hungarian cross-country skier. He competed in the men's 18 kilometre event at the 1948 Winter Olympics.
