= Stig Carlsson (ice hockey) =

Swedish ice hockey player

Personal information
- Nationality: Swedish
- Born: 17 January 1924 Stockholm, Sweden
- Died: 14 December 1978 (aged 54) Stockholm, Sweden

Sport
- Sport: Ice hockey

Stig Johannes Carlsson (17 January 1924 – 14 December 1978) was a Swedish ice hockey player. He competed in the men's tournaments at the 1948 Winter Olympics and the 1956 Summer Olympics.
