= Tadeusz Kwapień =

Polish cross-country skier

Taduesz Kwapień (February 25, 1923 – November 23, 2012) was a former Polish cross-country skier who competed in the 1940s and the 1950s.

He was born in Kościelisko and died in Zakopane.

Participated in three Olympic games. He was 47th in the 18 km event, 25th in the Nordic combined and 10th in the 4 x 10 km cross-country relay at the 1948 Winter Olympics in Sankt Moritz. He finished 41st in the 18 km event at the 1952 Winter Olympics in Oslo. In his last Olympic appearance at the 1956 Winter Olympics in Cortina d'Ampezzo Kwapień finished 16th in the 15 km event, 12th in the 30 km event and 9th in the 4 x 10 km relay.

Olympic Games
Preceded by Stanisław Marusarz	Flagbearer for Poland; Cortina d'Ampezzo 1956	Succeeded by Józef Karpiel
