= André Buffard =

French cross-country skier (1925–2017)

Personal information
- Full name: André Léopold Henri Buffard
- Nationality: French
- Born: 17 November 1925; Arc-et-Senans, France
- Died: 20 July 2017 (aged 91); Bourg-en-Bresse, France

Sport
- Sport: Cross-country

André Buffard (17 November 1925 – 20 July 2017) was a French cross-country skier who competed in the 1948 Winter Olympics.
