= Klas Lindström =

Swedish ice hockey player

Personal information
- Nationality: Swedish
- Born: 27 October 1920 Stockholm, Sweden
- Died: 2 June 2009 (aged 88) Stockholm, Sweden

Sport
- Sport: Ice hockey

Klas Artur Lindström (27 October 1920 – 2 June 2009) was a Swedish ice hockey player. He competed in the men's tournament at the 1948 Winter Olympics.
