= Henryk Bromowicz =

Polish ice hockey player

- Born: 22 February 1924; Katowice, Poland
- Died: 30 December 1982 (aged 58); Warsaw, Poland
- Position: Defence
- Shot: Right
- Played for: HKS Siemianowiczanka; RKS Sile Giszowiec; Legia Warsaw
- National team: Poland
- Playing career: 1945–1960

Henryk Bromowicz (22 February 1924 – 30 December 1982) was a Polish ice hockey defenceman.

== Career ==
Bromowicz played for HKS Siemianowiczanka, RKS Sile Giszowiec, and Legia Warsaw during his career. He was also a member of the Polish national team at the 1948, 1952, and 1956 Winter Olympics, and three world championships, in 1947, 1955, and 1957. After his playing career, he worked as a coach.
