= Sven Israelsson =

Swedish Nordic combined skier

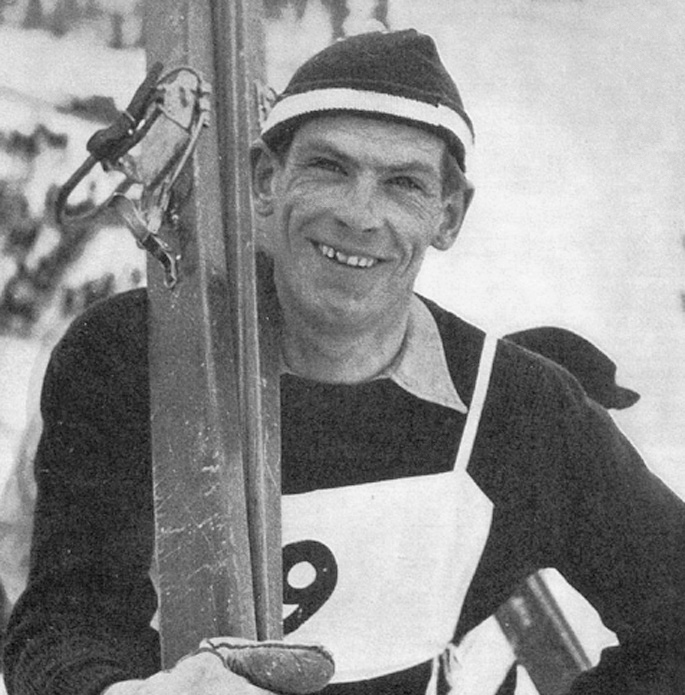

Personal information
- Born: 17 January 1920 Dala-Järna, Sweden
- Died: 9 October 1989 (aged 69) Dala-Järna, Sweden

Sport
- Sport: Nordic combined
- Club: Dala-Järna IK
Medal record
Men's Nordic combined
Representing Sweden
Olympic Games
Bronze medal – third place	1948 St. Moritz	Individual

Sven Israelsson (17 January 1920 – 9 October 1989) was a Swedish Nordic combined skier who won a bronze medal at the 1948 Winter Olympics. Earlier in 1947 he became the first foreigner to win the Nordic combined event at the Holmenkollen ski festival.

== Cross-country skiing results ==
=== Olympic Games ===
Year	Age	18 km	50 km	4 × 10 km relay
1948	28	16	—	—
