= Gustav Slanec =

Austrian speed skater

Personal information
- Nationality: Austrian
- Born: 20 May 1913; Vienna, Austria-Hungary
- Died: 18 June 1974 (aged 61)

Sport
- Sport: Speed skating

Gustav Slanec (20 May 1913 – 18 June 1974) was an Austrian speed skater. He competed at the 1936 Winter Olympics and the 1948 Winter Olympics.
