= Lars Ljungman =

Swedish ice hockey player

Personal information
- Nationality: Swedish
- Born: 1 April 1918 Stockholm, Sweden
- Died: 19 April 1962 (aged 44) Stockholm, Sweden

Sport
- Sport: Ice hockey

Lars Manfred Ljungman (1 April 1918 – 19 April 1962) was a Swedish ice hockey player. He competed in the men's tournament at the 1948 Winter Olympics.
