= Olaf Dufseth =

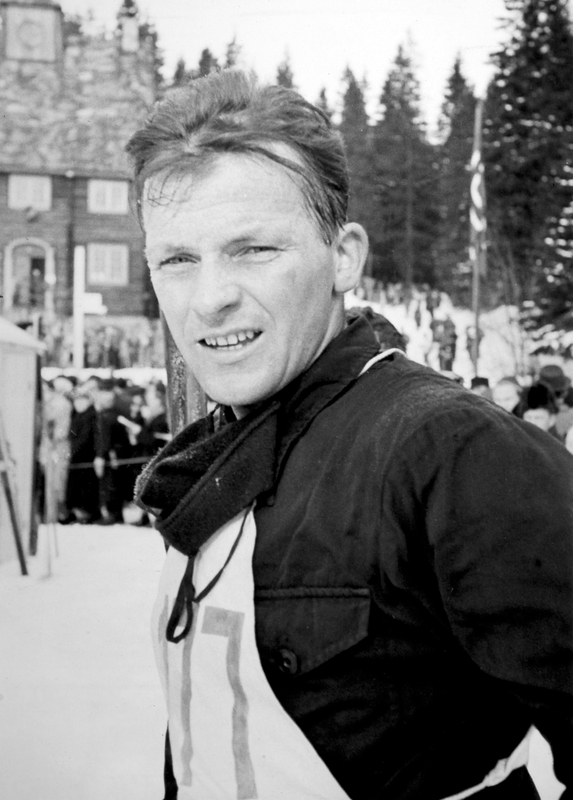
Olaf Dufseth

Olav Dufseth (December 19, 1917 – September 22, 2009) was a Norwegian Nordic combined and cross-country skier who competed in the 1940s.

Dufseth finished eighth in the Nordic combined event at the 1948 Winter Olympics at St. Moritz. In the 18 kilometre cross-country skiing event he finished 18th.

He was born in Vang Municipality in Hedmark county. He represented the club Vang SF. He died in September 2009 in Rena.

== Cross-country skiing results ==
=== Olympic Games ===
Year	Age	18 km	50 km	4 × 10 km relay
1948	28	18	—	—
