= Eero Rautiola =

Finnish cross-country skier

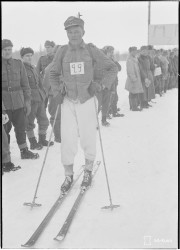
- Eero Rautiola 1942 in Kiestinki, Eatern Karelia.

Personal information
- Nationality: Finnish
- Born: 16 November 1921 Kemi, Finland
- Died: 2 August 2010 (aged 88)

Sport
- Sport: Cross-country skiing

Eero Rautiola (16 November 1921 – 2 August 2010) was a Finnish cross-country skier. He competed in the men's 18 km event at the 1948 Winter Olympics. He died in 2010.

== Cross-country skiing results ==
=== Olympic Games ===
Year	Age	18 km	50 km	4 × 10 km relay
1948	26	12	—	—
