= Josef Deutschmann =

Austrian cross-country skier (1920–1997)

Josef Deutschmann (6 December 1920 – 7 April 1997) was an Austrian cross-country skier who competed in the 1948 Winter Olympics. He was born in Bruck an der Mur. In 1948 he was a member of the Austrian relay team which finished fourth in the 4x10 km relay competition. In the 18 km event he finished 46th. He died in Kapfenberg in 1997.
