= Nikola Delev =

Bulgarian cross-country skier (1925–2004)

Personal information
- Nationality: Bulgarian
- Born: 6 January 1925
- Died: 9 March 2004 (aged 79)

Sport
- Sport: Cross-country skiing

Nikola Delev (Bulgarian: Никола Делев; 6 January 1925 – 9 March 2004) was a Bulgarian cross-country skier. He competed in the men's 18 kilometre event and Nordic combined at the 1948 Winter Olympics, placing 80th and 38th respectively.
