= Paul Bouveret =

French cross-country skier (1920–2003)

Personal information
- Full name: Paul Eugène Bouveret
- Nationality: French
- Born: 26 September 1920; Reculfoz, France
- Died: 18 April 2003 (aged 82); Mouthe, France

Sport
- Sport: Cross-country

Paul Bouveret (26 September 1920 – 18 April 2003) was a French cross-country skier who competed in the 1948 Winter Olympics.
