= Oskar Nowak (footballer) =

Polish footballer

Personal information
- Full name: Oskar Jan Nowak
- Date of birth: 2 February 2001 (age 25)
- Place of birth: Poznań, Poland
- Position: Left-back

Youth career
- –2014: Warta Poznań
- 2014–2018: Lech Poznań

Senior career*
Years	Team	Apps	(Gls)
2018–2019	Lech Poznań II	13	(1)
2019–2020	Błękitni Stargard	13	(0)
2020	Wigry Suwałki	5	(0)
2020–2021	Getafe B	0	(0)
2021	Chojniczanka	3	(0)
2021–2022	Sokół Kleczew	9	(0)
2022–2023	Avia Kamionki	14	(4)

International career
2015–2016	Poland U15	2	(0)
2018	Poland U17	2	(0)
2019	Poland U19	3	(1)
- * Club domestic league appearances and goals as of 19 May 2025

Oskar Jan Nowak (born 2 February 2001) is a Polish professional footballer who plays as a left-back.

== Club career ==
Born in Poznań, Nowak joined Lech Poznań's youth setup in 2014, from Warta Poznań. He made his senior debut with the former's reserves during the 2017–18 season, in the II liga.

In July 2019, Nowak moved to fellow third division side Błękitni Stargard. The following year, on 4 February, he joined I liga side Wigry Suwałki.

Nowak made his professional debut on 28 June 2020, starting in a 2–4 home loss against GKS Bełchatów. On 26 August, after five appearances, he agreed to a contract with Spanish La Liga side Getafe CF, being initially assigned to the B-team.

On 29 January 2021, Nowak returned to Poland and joined Chojniczanka Chojnice. On 10 September 2021, shortly after terminating his contract with Chojniczanka, he moved to a fourth division side Sokół Kleczew.

== Honours ==
Lech Poznań II

- III liga, group II: 2018–19

Avia Kamionki

- Regional league Greater Poland IV: 2022–23
