= Rudolf Wurmbrandt =

Austrian ice hockey player

Rudolf Wurmbrand
Personal information
- Nationality: Austrian
- Born: 20 September 1922; Brunn an der Wild, Austria
- Died: 15 June 1972 (aged 49); Mödling, Austria

Sport
- Sport: Ice hockey

Rudolf Wurmbrand (20 September 1922 - 15 June 1972) was an Austrian ice hockey player. He competed in the men's tournament at the 1948 Winter Olympics.
