= Martti Huhtala =

Finnish Nordic combined skier

Medal record

Men's Nordic combined

Representing Finland

Olympic Games
| Silver medal – second place | 1948 St. Moritz | Individual |

Martti Elias Huhtala (born 12 November 1918 in Rovaniemi, Finland - 25 October 2005 in Rovaniemi) was a Finnish Nordic combined athlete who competed in the late 1940s. He won a silver medal in the Nordic combined Individual at the 1948 Winter Olympics in St. Moritz.

== Cross-country skiing results ==
=== Olympic Games ===
| Year | Age | 18 km | 50 km | 4 × 10 km relay |
|---|---|---|---|---|
| 1948 | 29 | 10 | — | — |
