= Carlo Bulgheroni =

Italian ice hockey player

- Born: 6 June 1928; Milan, Italy
- Died: February 28, 1971 (aged 42); Milan, Italy
- Position: Centre
- National team: Italy
- Playing career: 1940–1952

Giancarlo Bulgheroni (6 June 1928 – 28 February 1971) was an Italian ice hockey player. He competed in the men's tournament at the 1948 Winter Olympics.
