= Jaroslav Kadavý =

Czech cross-country skier

Personal information
- Nationality: Czech
- Born: 22 January 1912
- Died: 4 January 2000 (aged 87)

Sport
- Sport: Cross-country skiing

Jaroslav Kadavý (22 January 1912 – 4 January 2000) was a Czech cross-country skier. He competed in the men's 18 kilometre event at the 1948 Winter Olympics.
