= Ralph Townsend (skier) =

American cross-country skier (1921–1988)

Personal information
- Nationality: American
- Born: December 28, 1921 Lebanon, New Hampshire, United States
- Died: May 27, 1988 (aged 66) Williamstown, Massachusetts, United States

Sport
- Sport: Cross-country skiing

Ralph Townsend (December 28, 1921 – May 27, 1988), also known as Robert J. Townsend, was an American cross-country skier. He competed in the men's 18 kilometre event at the 1948 Winter Olympics.
