= Engelbert Hundertpfund =

Austrian cross-country skier (1918–1999)

Engelbert Hundertpfund (22 February 1918 in Kematen in Tirol – 1 May 1999) was an Austrian cross-country skier who competed in the 1948 Winter Olympics.

In 1948 he was a member of the Austrian relay team which finished fourth in the 4x10 km relay competition. In the 18 km event he finished 39th.
