= Don Johnson (skier) =

American cross-country skier (1922–1951)

Personal information
- Nationality: American
- Born: June 11, 1922
- Died: March 17, 1951 (aged 28) Colorado, United States

Sport
- Sport: Cross-country skiing

Don Johnson (June 11, 1922 – March 17, 1951) was an American cross-country skier. He competed in the men's 18 kilometre event at the 1948 Winter Olympics. He was killed in a plane crash during a snowstorm.
