= Rizzieri Rodeghiero =

Italian cross-country and Nordic combined skier

Rizzieri Rodeghiero (December 5, 1919 – January 12, 1996) was an Italian cross-country and Nordic combined skier who competed in the 1948 Winter Olympics.

He is the younger brother of Christiano Rodeghiero.

In 1948 he was a member of the Italian relay team which finished sixth in the 4x10 km relay competition. He also participated in the 18 km event where he finished 31st. In the Nordic combined event he finished 15th.

== Further notable results ==
=== Cross-country skiing ===
- 1946: 2nd, Italian men's championships of cross-country skiing, 50 km
- 1947:
  - 1st, Italian men's championships of cross-country skiing, 46 km
  - 2nd, Italian men's championships of cross-country skiing, 18 km
- 1948:
  - 1st, Italian men's championships of cross-country skiing, 18 km
  - 2nd, Italian men's championships of cross-country skiing, 50 km
- 1951: 1st, Italian men's championships of cross-country skiing, 18 km

=== Nordic combined ===
- 1946: 1st, Italian championships of Nordic combined skiing
- 1947: 1st, Italian championships of Nordic combined skiing
- 1948: 1st, Italian championships of Nordic combined skiing
- 1951: 1st, Italian championships of Nordic combined skiing
- 1952: 2nd, Italian championships of Nordic combined skiing
