= Arcangelo Chiocchetti =

Italian cross-country skier

Personal information
- Nationality: Italian
- Born: 6 March 1921; Moena, Italy
- Died: 30 June 2001 (aged 80); Moena, Italy

Sport
- Sport: Cross-country skiing

Arcangelo Chiocchetti (6 March 1921 – 30 June 2001) was an Italian cross-country skier. He competed in the men's 18 kilometre event at the 1948 Winter Olympics.
