= Hansjörg Reichel =

Austrian ice hockey player (1922–2013)

Personal information
- Nationality: Austrian
- Born: 20 July 1922; Klagenfurt, Austria
- Died: 24 December 2013 (aged 91); Klagenfurt, Austria

Sport
- Sport: Ice hockey

Hansjörg Reichel (20 July 1922 – 24 December 2013) was an Austrian ice hockey player. He competed in the men's tournament at the 1948 Winter Olympics. He also competed in the water polo tournament at the 1952 Summer Olympics.
