= Aatto Pietikäinen =

Finnish ski jumper

Personal information
- Nationality: Finland
- Born: October 7, 1921 Kuopio, Finland
- Died: April 2, 1966 (aged 44) Kouvola, Finland

Sport
- Sport: Skiing

Aatto Pietikäinen (October 7, 1921, Kuopio – April 2, 1966) was a Finnish ski jumper who competed in the 1940s. He finished eighth in the individual large hill event at the 1948 Winter Olympics in St. Moritz.
