= Otto Rauth =

Italian ice hockey player

Personal information
- Nationality: Italian
- Born: 22 January 1914; Davos, Switzerland
- Died: 9 September 1978 (aged 64); Basel, Switzerland

Sport
- Sport: Ice hockey

Otto Rauth (22 January 1914 – 9 September 1978) was an Italian ice hockey player. He competed in the men's tournament at the 1948 Winter Olympics.
