= Gustav Gross (ice hockey) =

Austrian ice hockey player

Personal information
- Nationality: Austrian
- Born: 19 January 1926 Vienna, Austria

Sport
- Sport: Ice hockey

Gustav Gross (born 19 January 1926) was an Austrian ice hockey player. He competed in the men's tournament at the 1948 Winter Olympics. At the 1948 Olympics he played under his birth name August Specht. He later changed his last name to Gross.
