= Eilert Dahl =

Norwegian Nordic skier (1919–2004)

Medal record

Men's cross-country skiing

Representing Norway

World Championships
Bronze medal – third place	1950 Lake Placid	4 × 10 km relay

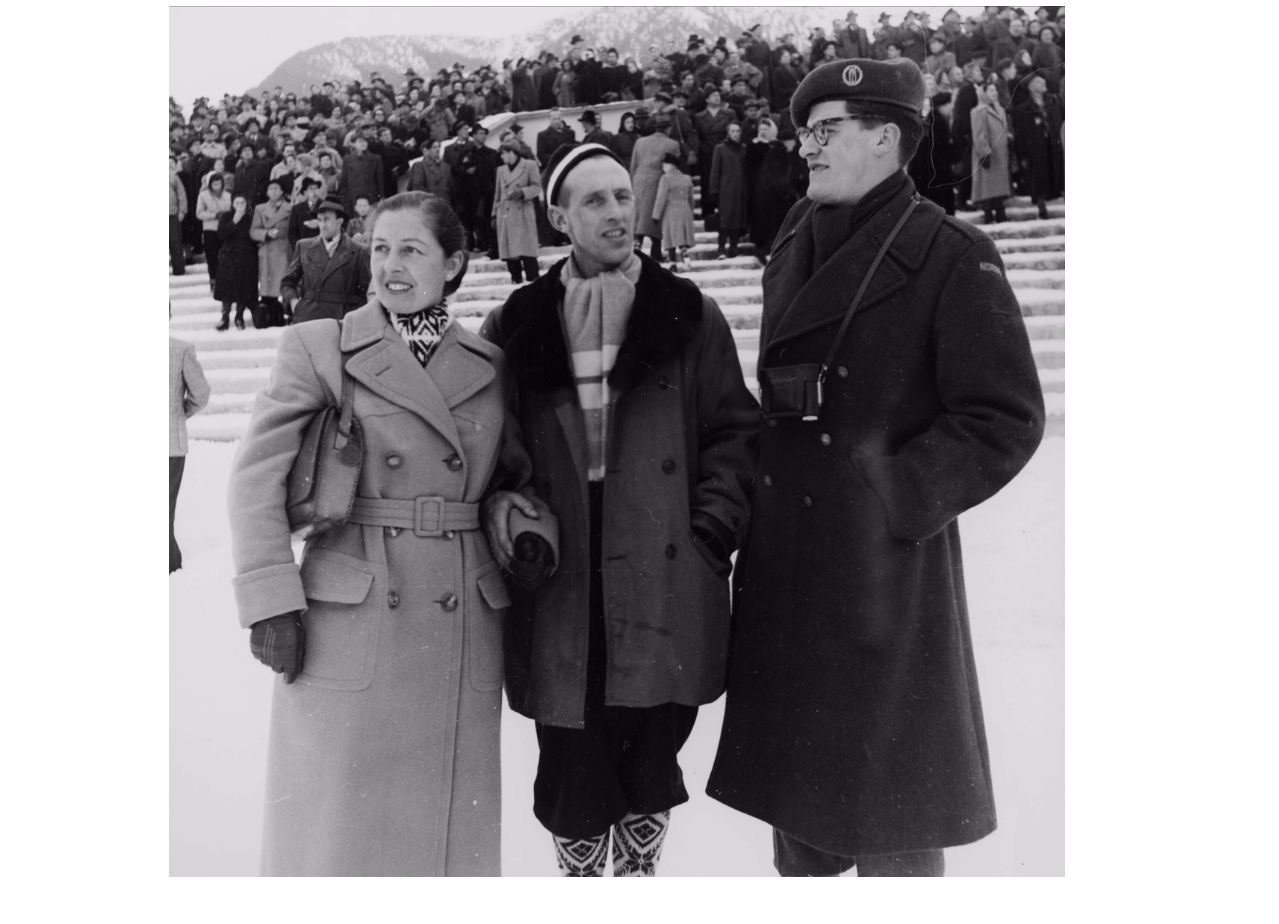
Eilert Dahl

Eilert Dahl (15 September 1919 – 3 November 2004) was a Norwegian Nordic skier who competed in the late 1940s and early 1950s. He won a bronze medal in the cross-country skiing 4 × 10 km relay at the 1950 FIS Nordic World Ski Championships in Lake Placid, New York.

Dahl also finished sixth in the Nordic combined event at the 1948 Winter Olympics in St. Moritz.

== Cross-country skiing results ==
All results are sourced from the International Ski Federation (FIS).

=== Olympic Games ===
Year	Age	18 km	50 km	4 × 10 km relay
1948	28	27	—	—

=== World Championships ===
- 1 medal – (1 bronze)

Year	Age	18 km	50 km	4 × 10 km relay
1950	30	23	—	Bronze
