= Friedrich Walter =

Austrian ice hockey player

Personal information
- Nationality: Austrian
- Born: 21 February 1924 Vienna, Austria
- Died: January 1980 (aged 55)

Sport
- Sport: Ice hockey

Friedrich Walter (21 February 1924 – January 1980) was an Austrian ice hockey player. He competed in the men's tournament at the 1948 Winter Olympics.
