= Julius Juhn =

Austrian ice hockey player (1921–1996)

Personal information
- Full name: Julius Erhard Juhn
- Nationality: Austrian
- Born: 19 December 1921; Vienna, Austria
- Died: 18 November 1996 (aged 74); Vienna, Austria

Sport
- Sport: Ice hockey

Julius Juhn (19 December 1921 – 18 November 1996) was an Austrian ice hockey player. He competed in the men's tournament at the 1948 Winter Olympics.
