= Lennie Baker (ice hockey) =

British ice hockey player

Personal information
- Nationality: British
- Born: 13 September 1918; Rochester, England
- Died: 8 July 2008 (aged 89); Worthing, England

Sport
- Sport: Ice hockey

Leonard William Baker (13 September 1918 – 8 July 2008) was a British ice hockey player. He competed in the men's tournament at the 1948 Winter Olympics.
