= Clas Haraldsson =

Swedish cross-country skier

Personal information
- Nationality: Swedish
- Born: 1 September 1922 Lycksele, Sweden
- Died: 14 August 1984 (aged 61) Lycksele, Sweden

Sport
- Sport: Cross-country skiing

Clas Haraldsson (1 September 1922 – 14 August 1984) was a Swedish cross-country skier. He competed in the 18 km event at the 1948 Winter Olympics.

== Cross-country skiing results ==
=== Olympic Games ===
Year	Age	18 km	50 km	4 × 10 km relay
1948	25	33	—	—
