= Helfried Winger =

Austrian ice hockey player

- Born: 23 October 1921 Vienna, Austria
- Died: 8 September 1998 (aged 76)
- Position: Defence
- National team: Austria
- Playing career: 1946–1948

Helfried Winger (23 October 1921 – 8 September 1998) was an Austrian ice hockey player. He competed in the men's tournament at the 1948 Winter Olympics.
