= Matthias Noichl =

Austrian cross-country skier

Matthias "Hias" Noichl (17 October 1920 – 19 December 2002) was an Austrian cross-country skier who competed in the 1940s and in the 1950s.

In 1948 he finished 45th in the 18 km competition.

Four years later he finished 28th in the 18 km event at the 1952 Winter Olympics in Oslo.
