= Kåre Østerdal =

Norwegian Nordic combined skier

Personal information
- Nationality: Norwegian
- Born: 2 December 1917 Rana Municipality, Norway
- Died: 21 November 1973 (aged 55)

Sport
- Sport: Skiing
- Events: Cross-country skiing; Nordic combined

Kåre Østerdal (2 December 1917 – 21 November 1973) was a Norwegian Olympic skier from Nordland county.

Østerdal was born in Rana Municipality. He competed in cross-country skiing and Nordic combined at the 1948 Winter Olympics.

== Cross-country skiing results ==
Year	Age	18 km	50 km	4 × 10 km relay
1948	30	32	—	—
