= Egon Engel =

Austrian ice hockey player

- Born: 1 December 1918 Vienna, Austria
- Died: 20 August 1974 (aged 55) Vienna, Austria
- Position: Defence
- National team: Austria

Egon Josef Engel (1 December 1918 – 20 August 1974) was an Austrian ice hockey player. He played for the Austrian national team at the 1948 Winter Olympics.
