= Willibald Stanek =

Austrian ice hockey player (1913-2007)

- Born: 4 December 1913 Vienna, Austria-Hungary
- Died: 4 June 2007 (aged 93) Vienna, Austria
- Position: Centre
- Played for: Wiener EV
- National team: Austria
- Playing career: 1930–1952

Willibald Walter Stanek (4 December 1913 – 4 June 2007) was an Austrian ice hockey player who competed for the Austrian national team at the 1936 Winter Olympics in Garmisch-Partenkirchen and the 1948 Winter Olympics in Saint-Moritz. He played a total of 14 games at the two Olympics.

Stanek also made 18 appearances for the Austrian national team at the World Championships between 1935 and 1949, scoring four goals. He played club hockey for Wiener EV in the Austrian Hockey Championship.
