= Luigi Bestagini =

Italian ice hockey player

- Born: 28 August 1919; Milan, Italy
- Died: 29 April 1993 (aged 73); Milan, Italy
- Position: Defence
- National team: Italy

Luigi Bestagini (28 August 1919 – 29 April 1993) was an Italian ice hockey player. He competed in the men's tournament at the 1948 Winter Olympics.
