= Theo Allenbach =

Swiss cross-country skier

Personal information
- Nationality: Swiss
- Born: 11 April 1925 Adelboden, Switzerland
- Died: 28 May 2004 (aged 79)

Sport
- Sport: Cross-country skiing

Theo Allenbach (11 January 1925 – 28 May 2004) was a Swiss cross-country skier. He competed in the men's 18 kilometre event at the 1948 Winter Olympics.
