= Fritz Demmer =

Austrian ice hockey player (1911-1966)

- Born: 17 April 1911 Vienna, Austria-Hungary
- Died: 29 January 1966 (aged 54) Vienna, Austria
- Position: Left wing
- Played for: Wiener EV
- National team: Austria
- Playing career: 1928–1949

Friedrich Eduard Maria Demmer (17 April 1911 – 29 January 1966) was an Austrian ice hockey player who competed for the Austrian national team at the 1936 Winter Olympics in Garmisch-Partenkirchen and the 1948 Winter Olympics in Saint-Moritz. Demmer played 12 games at the two Olympics, scoring a total of six goals.

He also made 54 appearances for the Austrian national team at the World Championships between 1930 and 1949. Demmer was a top offensive threat on the team, scoring 31 goals in his World Championship career. He played club hockey for Wiener EV in the Austrian Hockey Championship.
