= Walter Feistritzer =

Austrian ice hockey player

- Born: 21 April 1920; Vienna, Austria
- Died: January 5, 1981 (aged 60); Vienna, Austria
- Position: Centre
- National team: Austria

Walter Feistritzer (21 April 1920 – 5 January 1981) was an Austrian ice hockey player. He played for the Austrian national team at the 1948 Winter Olympics.
