= Herbert Ulrich =

Austrian ice hockey player (1921–2002)

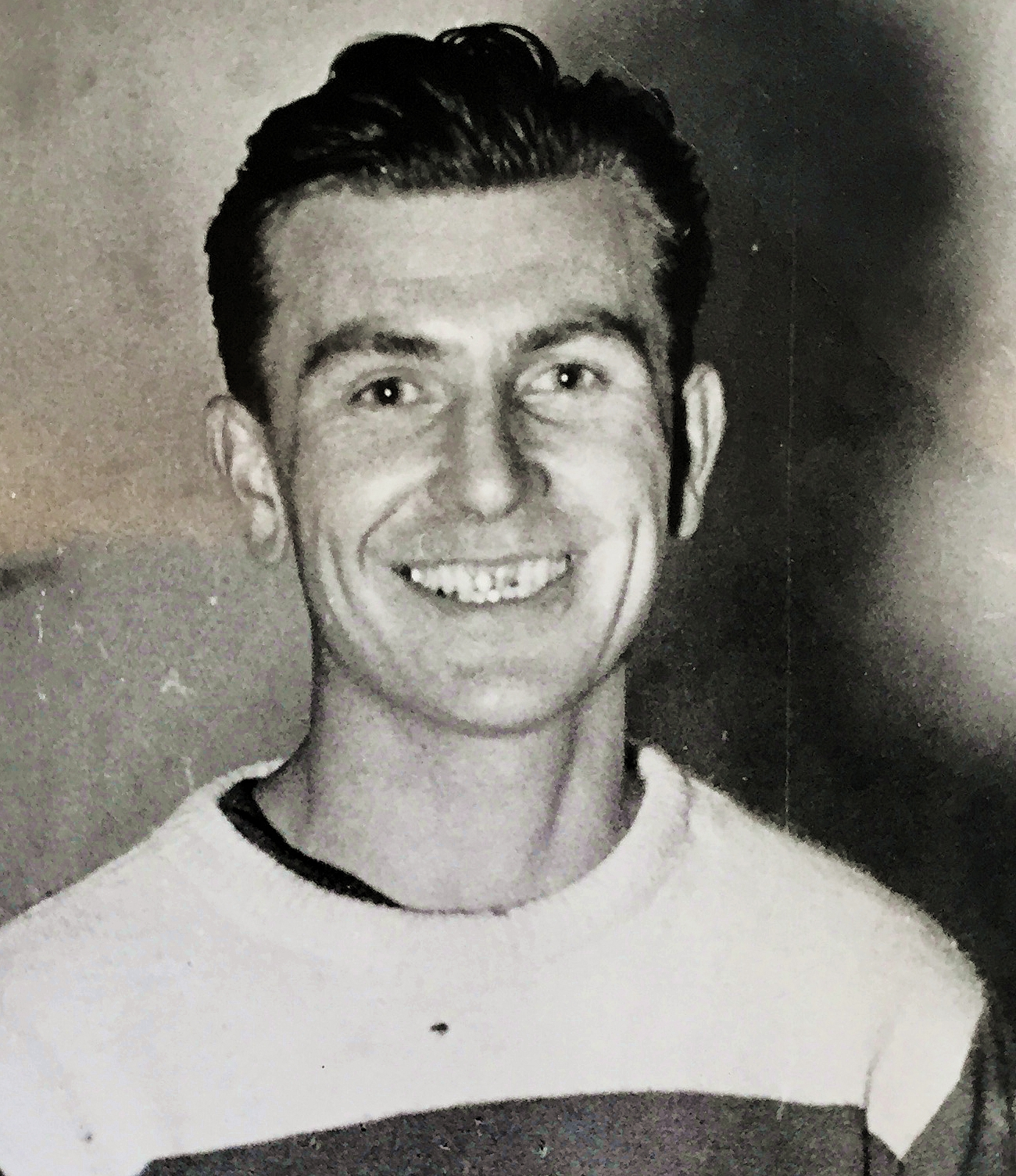
- Herbert Ulrich in 1951

Personal information
- Nationality: Austrian
- Born: 14 September 1921 Vienna, Austria
- Died: 23 May 2002 (aged 80)

Sport
- Sport: Ice hockey

Herbert Ulrich (14 September 1921 – 23 May 2002) was an Austrian ice hockey player. He competed in the men's tournament at the 1948 Winter Olympics.
