= Karl Rafreider =

Austrian cross-country skier

Karl Rafreider (6 March 1917 – 14 January 2003) was an Austrian cross-country skier who competed in the late 1940s and early 1950s. Competing in three Winter Olympics in the 4 x 10 km relay, his best finish was fourth at St. Moritz in 1948. He was born in Brixen.
