= Josl Gstrein =

Austrian skier (1917–1980)

Josef "Josl" Gstrein (31 December 1917 in Obergurgl – 11 September 1980) was an Austrian cross-country and Nordic combined skier who competed in the 1948 Winter Olympics.

In 1948 he was a member of the Austrian relay team which finished fourth in the 4x10 km relay competition. He also participated in the 50 km competition and finished twelfth and in the 18 km event where he finished 36th. In the Nordic combined event he finished 16th.
