= Hans Schneider (ice hockey) =

Austrian ice hockey player

Personal information
- Nationality: Austrian
- Born: 14 September 1913 Vienna, Austria
- Died: 22 January 1993 (aged 79) Vienna, Austria

Sport
- Sport: Ice hockey

Johann Schneider (14 September 1913 – 22 January 1993) was an Austrian ice hockey player. He competed in the men's tournament at the 1948 Winter Olympics.

== Career ==
Schneider played for the Pötzleinsdorfer Sport Klub from 1931 and remained active there even after it was renamed EK Engelmann Wien, winning the German championship title with them in 1939 . After the 1939 merger of EKE and the Vienna Ice Skating Club to form the Vienna EG, he played for them from 1939 and became German champion again with them in 1940 . After the Second World War he played from 1946 again for EK Engelmann Vienna.

Internationally he played for the Austrian national ice hockey team at the Ice Hockey World Championships in 1935 and 1938 and after 1938 for the German national ice hockey team After World War II he played again for the Austrian national team at the 1948 Winter Olympics and at the 1947 Ice Hockey World Championships, where he won the bronze medal with the team.
