= Giancarlo Bucchetti =

Italian ice hockey player (1925–1989)

Personal information
- Nationality: Italian
- Born: 25 August 1925; Milan, Kingdom of Italy
- Died: 3 August 1989 (aged 63); Paderno Dugnano, Italy

Sport
- Sport: Ice hockey

Giancarlo Bucchetti (25 August 1925 – 3 August 1989) was an Italian ice hockey player. He competed in the men's tournament at the 1948 Winter Olympics.
