= Olav Odden =

Norwegian Nordic combined skier

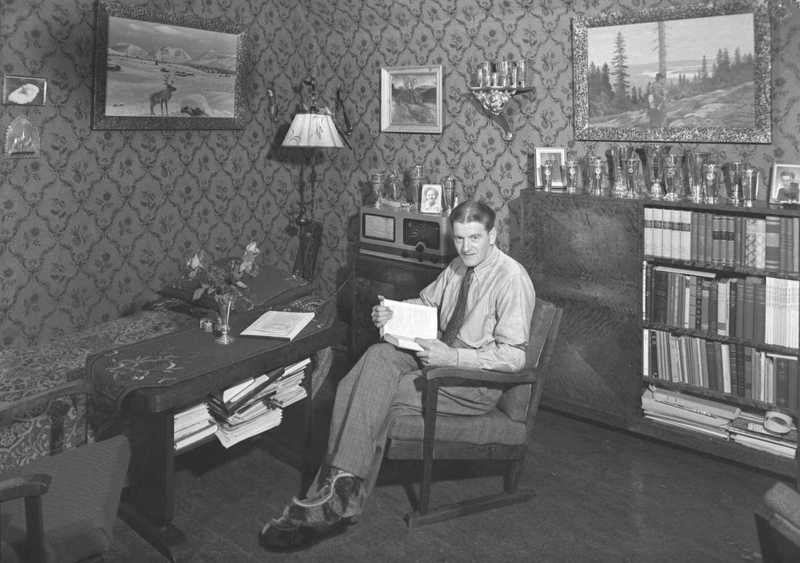

Personal information
- Nationality: Norwegian
- Born: 28 September 1914
- Died: 28 January 1969 (aged 54)

Sport
- Sport: Skiing
- Events: Cross-country skiing; Nordic combined

Olav Magnar Odden (28 September 1914 – 28 January 1969) was a Norwegian skier from Folldal Municipality. He competed in cross-country skiing and Nordic combined at the 1948 Winter Olympics.

He was Norwegian champion in 30 km in 1938 and a winner in Nordic combined in Holmenkollen in 1946.

== Cross-country skiing results ==
=== Olympic Games ===
Year	Age	18 km	50 km	4 × 10 km relay
1948	33	14	—	—

=== World Championships ===
Year	Age	18 km	50 km	4 × 10 km relay
1938	23	53	—	—
1939	24	21	—	4
