= Franz Csöngei =

Austrian ice hockey player (1913-2004)

- Born: 13 September 1913 Vienna, Austria-Hungary
- Died: February 25, 2004 (aged 90) Bad Aussee, Austria
- Position: Defence/Centre
- Played for: EK Engelmann Wien
- National team: Austria
- Playing career: 1927–1948

Franz Xaver Csöngei (13 September 1913 - 25 February 2004) was an Austrian ice hockey player who competed for the Austrian national team at the 1936 Winter Olympics in Garmisch-Partenkirchen and the 1948 Winter Olympics in Saint-Moritz. Csöngei made a total of 13 appearances at the two Olympics, scoring six goals.

Csöngei also played for the Austrian national team at the World Championships between 1933 and 1947, scoring one goal in 30 games played. He played club hockey for EK Engelmann Wien in the Austrian Hockey Championship.
