= Adolf Hafner =

Austrian ice hockey player (1926–2019)

Adolf Hafner (5 January 1926 – 23 April 2019) was an Austrian ice hockey player who competed in the 1948, when he was an unused substitute and in the 1956 Winter Olympics. Hafner died on 23 April 2019, aged 93.
