= Tone Razinger =

Slovenian cross-country skier

Personal information
- Nationality: Slovenian
- Born: 13 June 1921; Jesenice, Yugoslavia
- Died: 6 December 2006 (aged 85); Jesenice, Slovenia

Sport
- Sport: Cross-country skiing

Tone Razinger (13 June 1921 – 6 December 2006) was a Slovenian cross-country skier. He competed in the men's 18 kilometre event at the 1948 Winter Olympics. He died in his native Jesenice on 6 December 2006.
