= Karl Martitsch =

Austrian cross-country skier

Personal information
- Nationality: Austrian
- Born: 19 November 1917; Kärnten, Austria-Hungary
- Died: 20 August 2000 (aged 82); Toronto, Ontario, Canada

Sport
- Sport: Cross-country skiing

Karl Martitsch (19 November 1917 – 20 August 2000) was an Austrian cross-country skier. He competed in the men's 18 kilometre event at the 1948 Winter Olympics.
