= Hubert Hammerschmied =

Austrian cross-country skier (1914–1994)

Personal information
- Nationality: Austrian
- Born: 6 August 1914
- Died: 19 February 1994 (aged 79); Thiersee, Austria

Sport
- Sport: Cross-country skiing

Hubert Hammerschmied (6 August 1914–19 February 1994) was an Austrian cross-country skier. He competed in the men's 18 kilometre event at the 1948 Winter Olympics.
