= Gottlieb Perren =

Swiss alpine skier (1926–2014)

Personal information
- Nationality: Swiss
- Born: 14 April 1926; Zermatt, Switzerland
- Died: 10 May 2014 (aged 88); Zermatt, Switzerland

Sport
- Sport: Skiing

Gottlieb Perren (14 April 1926 – 10 May 2014) was a Swiss skier. He competed at the 1948 Winter Olympics and the 1952 Winter Olympics.
