= Olavi Sihvonen =

Finnish Nordic combined skier

Olavi Sihvonen (24 September 1918 – 21 October 1984) was a Finnish Nordic combined skier who competed in the 1940s. He finished fifth in the Nordic combined event at the 1948 Winter Olympics in St. Moritz.

== Cross-country skiing results ==
=== Olympic Games ===
| Year | Age | 18 km | 50 km | 4 × 10 km relay |
|---|---|---|---|---|
| 1948 | 29 | 23 | — | — |

=== World Championships ===
| Year | Age | 18 km | 50 km | 4 × 10 km relay |
|---|---|---|---|---|
| 1938 | 19 | 129 | — | — |
