= Oskar Nowak (ice hockey) =

Austrian ice hockey player (1913-1989)

- Born: 25 March 1913 Vienna, Austria-Hungary
- Died: 29 June 1989 (aged 76) Vienna, Austria
- Position: Right wing
- Played for: EK Engelmann Wien
- National team: Austria
- Playing career: 1930–1948

Oskar Johann Nowak (25 March 1913 – 29 June 1989) was an Austrian ice hockey player who competed for the Austrian national team at the 1936 Winter Olympics in Garmisch-Partenkirchen and the 1948 Winter Olympics in Saint-Moritz.

== Career ==
In the 13 games Nowak played at the two Olympics, he scored five goals. He also competed in the men's field hockey tournament at the 1948 Summer Olympics.

Nowak was also a key component of the Austrian national team at the World Championships, making a total of 29 appearances between 1934 and 1947. He was among the top scorers on the national team, scoring 21 goals at the World Championships. Nowak played club hockey for EK Engelmann Wien in the Austrian Hockey Championship.
