= Paul Haslwanter =

Austrian cross-country skier (1915–1951)

Personal information
- Nationality: Austrian
- Born: 17 January 1915 Seefeld in Tirol, Austria-Hungary
- Died: 26 May 1951 (aged 36) Linz, Austria

Sport
- Sport: Cross-country skiing

Paul Haslwanter (17 January 1915 – 26 May 1951) was an Austrian cross-country skier. He competed in the men's 18 kilometre event at the 1948 Winter Olympics.
