= Alberto Tassotti =

Italian cross-country skier

Personal information
- Nationality: Italian
- Born: 16 June 1918; Paluzza, Italy
- Died: 29 June 2008 (aged 90); Gemona del Friuli, Italy

Sport
- Sport: Cross-country skiing

Alberto Tassotti (16 June 1918 – 29 June 2008) was an Italian cross-country skier. He competed in the men's 18 kilometre event at the 1948 Winter Olympics.
