= Pauli Salonen =

Finnish Nordic combined skier

Pauli Salonen (14 February 1916, Hollola – 10 January 2009) was a Finnish Nordic combined skier who competed during the 1940s. He finished seventh in the individual event at the 1948 Winter Olympics in St. Moritz, Switzerland.

== Cross-country skiing results ==
=== Olympic Games ===
Year	Age	18 km	50 km	4 × 10 km relay
1948	32	24	—	—

=== World Championships ===
Year	Age	18 km	50 km	4 × 10 km relay
1938	22	184	—	—
