= Alfredo Prucker =

Italian Nordic skier

Alfredo Prucker (13 May 1926 – 22 November 2015) was an Italian Nordic skier who competed in the 1940s and 1950s.

At the 1948 Winter Olympics, Prucker finished 29th in the 18 km cross-country skiing event. Prucker finished 12th in the Nordic combined event and 38th in the 18 km cross-country skiing event. His best finish at the Winter Olympics occurred at Cortina d'Ampezzo in 1956 when he finished eight in the Nordic combined event.

== Further notable results ==
=== Cross-country skiing ===
- 1954: 3rd, Italian men's championships of cross-country skiing, 50 km
- 1956: 3rd, Italian men's championships of cross-country skiing, 50 km

=== Nordic combined ===
- 1947: 3rd, Italian championships of Nordic combined skiing
- 1948: 2nd, Italian championships of Nordic combined skiing
- 1950: 1st, Italian championships of Nordic combined skiing
- 1951: 2nd, Italian championships of Nordic combined skiing
- 1952: 1st, Italian championships of Nordic combined skiing
- 1953: 1st, Italian championships of Nordic combined skiing
- 1954: 1st, Italian championships of Nordic combined skiing
- 1955: 1st, Italian championships of Nordic combined skiing
- 1956: 1st, Italian championships of Nordic combined skiing
