= Czechoslovakia at the 1948 Winter Olympics =

- IOC code: TCH
- NOC: Czechoslovak Olympic Committee

in St. Moritz
- Competitors: 47 (41 men, 6 women) in 8 sports
- Flag bearer: Vladimír Zábrodský (ice hockey)
- Medals Ranked 11th: Gold 0 Silver 1 Bronze 0 Total 1

Winter Olympics appearances (overview)
- 1924; 1928; 1932; 1936; 1948; 1952; 1956; 1960; 1964; 1968; 1972; 1976; 1980; 1984; 1988; 1992

Other related appearances
- Czech Republic (1994–pres.); Slovakia (1994–pres.)

Czechoslovakia competed at the 1948 Winter Olympics in St. Moritz, Switzerland. The country's only medal was a silver in ice hockey.

== Medalists ==
Medal	Name	Sport	Event	Date
Silver	Czechoslovakia men's national ice hockey team: Bohumil Modrý; Zdeněk Jarkovský; Miroslav Sláma; Josef Trousílek; Přemysl Hainý; Vilibald Šťovík; Oldřich Zábrodský; Miloslav Pokorný; Ladislav Troják; Vladimír Zábrodský; Stanislav Konopásek; Václav Roziňák; Jaroslav Drobný; Karel Stibor; Vladimír Kobranov; Gustav Bubník; Vladimír Bouzek	Ice hockey	Men's competition	8 February

== Alpine skiing ==
Men

Athlete	Event	Race 1		Race 2		Total	
Athlete	Event	Time	Rank	Time	Rank	Time	Rank
Daniel Šlachta	Downhill					3:29.4	46
Luboš Brchel	Downhill					3:12.4	27
Antonín Šponar	Downhill					3:09.1	17
Zdeněk Parma	Slalom	DNF	–	–	–	DNF	–
Daniel Šlachta	Slalom	1:21.0	31	1:17.7	36	2:38.7	33
Antonín Šponar	Slalom	1:20.2 (+0:05)	29	1:06.5	13	2:26.7	22
Luboš Brchel	Slalom	1:10.8	9	1:05.8	9	2:16.6	9

Men's combined

The downhill part of this event was held along with the main medal event of downhill skiing. For athletes competing in both events, the same time was used (see table above for the results). The slalom part of the event was held separate from the main medal event of slalom skiing (included in table below).

Athlete	Slalom			Total (downhill + slalom)	
Athlete	Time 1	Time 2	Rank	Points	Rank
Daniel Šlachta	1:37.4 (+0:05)	1:12.0	36	34.41	33
Luboš Brchel	1:19.1	1:07.2	13	14.85	14
Antonín Šponar	1:13.1	1:09.4	6	11.19	9

Women

Athlete	Event	Race 1		Race 2		Total	
Athlete	Event	Time	Rank	Time	Rank	Time	Rank
Božena Moserová	Downhill					2:46.1	25
Alexandra Nekvapilová	Downhill					2:37.2	14
Božena Moserová	Slalom	1:12.5	20	1:07.6	17	2:20.1	19
Alexandra Nekvapilová	Slalom	1:03.2	7	1:08.8	18	2:12.0	16

Women's combined

The downhill part of this event was held along with the main medal event of downhill skiing. For athletes competing in both events, the same time was used (see table above for the results). The slalom part of the event was held separate from the main medal event of slalom skiing (included in table below).

Athlete	Slalom			Total (downhill + slalom)	
Athlete	Time 1	Time 2	Rank	Points	Rank
Božena Moserová	1:14.6	1:07.0	19	23.01	18
Alexandra Nekvapilová	1:05.9	1:02.9	4	10.98	9

== Bobsleigh ==
Sled	Athletes	Event	Run 1		Run 2		Run 3		Run 4		Total	
Sled	Athletes	Event	Time	Rank	Time	Rank	Time	Rank	Time	Rank	Time	Rank
TCH-1	Max Ippen; Eduard Novotný	Two-man	1:27.2	14	1:26.4	13	1:26.3	14	1:26.7	14	5:46.6	14

Sled	Athletes	Event	Run 1		Run 2		Run 3		Run 4		Total	
Sled	Athletes	Event	Time	Rank	Time	Rank	Time	Rank	Time	Rank	Time	Rank
TCH-1	Max Ippen; František Zajíšek; Ivan Šipajlo; Eduard Novotný	Four-man	1:20.6	13	1:24.1	13	1:25.4	14	1:25.4	14	5:35.5	14

== Cross-country skiing ==
Men

Event	Athlete	Race	
Event	Athlete	Time	Rank
18 km	Jaroslav Lukeš	1'41:00	78
18 km	František Šimůnek	1'35:21	72
18 km	Jaroslav Kadavý	1'32:17	67
18 km	Štefan Kovalčík	1'31:06	63
18 km	Jaroslav Zajíček	1'29:44	60
18 km	Bohumil Kosour	1'29:37	58
18 km	Vít Fousek Sr.	1'29:37	58
18 km	Jaroslav Cardal	1'25:44	40
50 km	Vít Fousek Sr.	DNF	–
50 km	Jaroslav Zajíček	4'44:35	20
50 km	František Balvín	4'17:51	11
50 km	Jaroslav Cardal	4'14:34	8

Men's 4 x 10 km relay

Athletes	Race	
Athletes	Time	Rank
Štefan Kovalčík; František Balvín; Jaroslav Zajíček; Jaroslav Cardal	2'54:56	8

== Figure skating ==
Men

Athlete	CF	FS	Points	Places	Final rank
Zdenek Fikar	12	13	154.155	114	13
Ladislav Cáp	10	11	160.233	96	10

Women

Athlete	CF	FS	Points	Places	Final rank
Dagmar Lerchová	15	8	144.433	112	13
Alena Vrzáňová	7	3	153.044	44	5
Jirína Nekolová	4	4	154.088	34	4

Pairs

Athletes	Points	Places	Final rank
Blazena Knittlová; Karel Vosátka	DNS	–	–

== Ice hockey ==
The tournament was run in a round-robin format with nine teams participating.

	Pld	W	L	T	GF	GA	Pts
Canada	8	7	0	1	69	5	15
Czechoslovakia (silver)	8	7	0	1	80	18	15
Switzerland	8	6	2	0	67	21	12
Sweden	8	4	4	0	55	28	8
Great Britain	8	3	5	0	39	47	6
Poland	8	2	6	0	29	97	4
Austria	8	1	7	0	33	77	2
Italy	8	0	8	0	24	156	0
United States *	8	5	3	0	86	33	10

* United States team was disqualified. Only eight teams are officially ranked.

- Czechoslovakia 22-3 Italy
- Czechoslovakia 6-3 Sweden
- Czechoslovakia 13-2 Poland
- Czechoslovakia 11-4 United Kingdom
- Czechoslovakia 17-3 Austria
- Canada 0-0 Czechoslovakia
- Czechoslovakia 7-1 Switzerland
- Czechoslovakia 4-3 USA

Silver:
Bohumil Modrý
Zdeněk Jarkovský
Miroslav Sláma
Josef Trousílek
Přemysl Hainý
Vilibald Šťovík
Oldřich Zábrodský
Miloslav Pokorný
Ladislav Troják
Vladimír Zábrodský
Stanislav Konopásek
Václav Roziňák
Jaroslav Drobný
Karel Stibor
Vladimír Kobranov
Gustav Bubník
Vladimír Bouzek

== Nordic combined ==
Events:

- 18 km cross-country skiing
- normal hill ski jumping

The cross-country skiing part of this event was combined with the main medal event, meaning that athletes competing here were skiing for two disciplines at the same time. Details can be found above in this article, in the cross-country skiing section.

The ski jumping (normal hill) event was held separate from the main medal event of ski jumping, results can be found in the table below. Athletes would perform three jumps, of which the two best jumps (distance and form) were counted.

Athlete	Event	Cross-country		Ski jumping					Total	
Athlete	Event	Points	Rank	Distance 1	Distance 2	Distance 3	Points	Rank	Points	Rank
Jaroslav Lukeš	Individual	115.50	37	63.5	62.0	65.0	205.4	12	320.90	35
František Šimůnek	Individual	142.50	32	51.0	50.0	52.0	169.8	35	312.30	36
Jaroslav Kadavý	Individual	157.50	29	51.5	55.0	55.5	181.1	29	338.60	31
Bohumil Kosour	Individual	169.50	24	44.5	47.5	48.5 (fall)	159.0	37	328.50	32

== Ski jumping ==
Athlete	Event	Distance 1	Distance 2	Total points	Rank
Jaroslav Lukeš	Normal hill	58.0	60.5	198.5	21
Josef Císař	Normal hill	59.0	62.0	189.4	29
Zdeněk Remsa	Normal hill	59.0	61.5	198.6	20
Miloslav Bělonožník	Normal hill	61.0	60.0	203.9	16

== Speed skating ==
Men

Event	Athlete	Race	
Event	Athlete	Time	Rank
500 m	Vladimír Kolář	46.1	26
1500 m	Vladimír Kolář	2:25.6	26
5000 m	Vladimír Kolář	8:58.9	22
10,000 m	Vladimír Kolář	DSQ	–
