= 1949 Ice Hockey World Championships =

1949 edition of the IIHF World Ice Hockey Championship

Tournament details
- Host country: Sweden
- Dates: 12–20 February
- Teams: 10

Final positions
- Champions: Czechoslovakia (2nd title)
- Runners-up: Canada
- Third place: United States
- Fourth place: Sweden

Tournament statistics
- Games played: 31
- Goals scored: 360 (11.61 per game)

The 1949 Ice Hockey World Championships were the 16th World Championships and 27th European Hockey Championships was held from February 12 to 20, 1949, in Stockholm, Sweden. The event was the first World Championships during the presidency of Canadian W. G. Hardy. The International Ice Hockey Federation allowed for an unlimited number of entrants, after rejecting a proposal to limit the event to eight teams.

In the initial round, the ten teams participating were divided into three groups: two groups of three and one of four. In the second round, the top two teams in each group advanced to the medal round (for positions 1 through 6) with the remaining four teams advancing to the consolation round for places 7 through 10.

Czechoslovakia overcame tragedy to win their second world championship and ninth European Championship. In November 1948 six Czechoslovak players (Ladislav Troják, Karel Stibor, Zdeněk Jarkovský, Vilibald Šťovík, Miloslav Pokorný and defenseman Zdeněk Švarc) were lost when their plane went missing crossing the English Channel. Despite the key losses to their roster, they defeated the Sudbury Wolves, Canada's representative, three to two. It was only the third defeat for the Canadians at a World Championship. The Americans were able to top the Czechoslovaks in the final round, which earned them a bronze medal, and kept the host Swedes off the podium.

== World Ice Hockey Championship (in Stockholm, Sweden) ==
=== First round ===
==== Group A ====
12 February 1949	Stockholm	Canada	–	Denmark	47:0 (13:0,16:0,18:0)
13 February 1949	Stockholm	Canada	–	Austria	7:0 (0:0,3:0,4:0)
14 February 1949	Stockholm	Austria	–	Denmark	25:1 (8:0,6:0,11:1)

Standings

Pos.	Team	G.P.	Wins	Ties	Losses	Goals	Goal diff	Pts.
1	Canada	2	2	0	0	54: 0	+54	4:0
2	Austria	2	1	0	1	25: 8	+17	2:2
3	Denmark	2	0	0	2	1:72	-71	0:4

==== Group B ====
12 February 1949	Stockholm	Norway	–	Belgium	2:0 (2:0,0:0,0:0)
12 February 1949	Stockholm	USA	–	Switzerland	12:5 (6:2,4:1,2:2)
13 February 1949	Stockholm	Switzerland	–	Belgium	18:2 (5:0,10:1,3:1)
13 February 1949	Stockholm	USA	–	Norway	12:1 (7:1,3:0,2:0)
14 February 1949	Stockholm	Switzerland	–	Norway	7:1 (4:1,3:0,0:0)
14 February 1949	Stockholm	USA	–	Belgium	12:0 (4:0,5:0,3:0)

Standings

Pos.	Team	G.P.	Wins	Ties	Losses	Goals	Goal diff	Pts.
1	USA	3	3	0	0	36: 6	+30	6:0
2	Switzerland	3	2	0	1	30:15	+15	4:2
3	Norway	3	1	0	2	4:19	-15	2:4
4	Belgium	3	0	0	3	2:32	-30	0:6

==== Group C ====
12 February 1949	Stockholm	Sweden	–	Finland	12:1 (2:0,3:0,7:1)
13 February 1949	Stockholm	Sweden	–	Czechoslovakia	4:2 (3:0,1:2,0:0)
14 February 1949	Stockholm	Czechoslovakia	–	Finland	19:2 (8:1,3:1,8:0)

Standings

Pos.	Team	G.P.	Wins	Ties	Losses	Goals	Goal diff	Pts.
1	Sweden	2	2	0	0	16: 3	+13	4:0
2	Czechoslovakia	2	1	0	1	21: 6	+15	2:2
3	Finland	2	0	0	2	3:31	-28	0:4

==== Consolation Round – places 7 to 10 ====
17 February 1949	Stockholm	Belgium	–	Denmark	8:3 (2:1,4:2,2:0)
17 February 1949	Stockholm	Finland	–	Norway	7:3 (4:3,2:0,1:0)
18 February 1949	Stockholm	Finland	–	Belgium	17:2 (6:0,4:0,7:2)
18 February 1949	Stockholm	Norway	–	Denmark	Denmark withdrew
19 February 1949	Stockholm	Finland	–	Denmark	Denmark withdrew
19 February 1949	Stockholm	Norway	–	Belgium	14:1 (5:0,6:0,3:1)

Standings

Pos.	Team	G.P.	Wins	Ties	Losses	Goals	Goal diff	Pts.
7	Finland	3	3	0	0	29: 5	+24	6:0
8	Norway	3	2	0	1	22: 8	+14	4:2
9	Belgium	3	1	0	2	11:34	-23	2:4
10	Denmark	3	0	0	3	3: 18	15	0:6

==== Final Round – places 1 to 6 ====
15 February 1949	Stockholm	Canada	–	Czechoslovakia	2:3 (0:0,1:2,1:1)
15 February 1949	Stockholm	Sweden	–	Austria	18:0 (5:0,5:0,8:0)
15 February 1949	Stockholm	USA	–	Switzerland	4:5 (1:4,3:0,0:1)
16 February 1949	Stockholm	Czechoslovakia	–	Austria	7:1 (4:0,2:0,1:1)
16 February 1949	Stockholm	Sweden	–	Canada	2:2 (0:1,1:0,1:1)
17 February 1949	Stockholm	Canada	–	USA	7:2 (2:0,1:2,4:0)
17 February 1949	Stockholm	Sweden	–	Switzerland	3:1 (0:0,2:1,1:0)
18 February 1949	Stockholm	Czechoslovakia	–	Switzerland	8:1 (4:0,1:1,3:0)
18 February 1949	Stockholm	Canada	–	Austria	8:2 (3:0,3:1,2:1)
18 February 1949	Stockholm	Sweden	–	USA	3:6 (1:0,0:4,2:2)
19 February 1949	Stockholm	Switzerland	–	Austria	10:1 (4:0,3:1,3:0)
19 February 1949	Stockholm	USA	–	Czechoslovakia	2:0 (0:0,1:0,1:0)
20 February 1949	Stockholm	USA	–	Austria	9:1 (0:1,3:0,6:0)
20 February 1949	Stockholm	Sweden	–	Czechoslovakia	0:3 (0:0,0:2,0:1)
20 February 1949	Stockholm	Canada	–	Switzerland	1:1 (0:1,0:0,1:0)

Standings

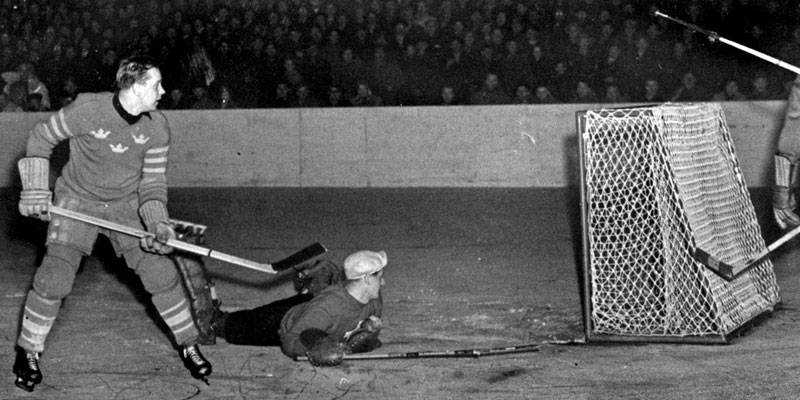
Holger Nurmela scores his third goal for Sweden against Switzerland

Pos.	Team	G.P.	Wins	Ties	Losses	Goals	Goal diff	Pts.
1	Czechoslovakia	5	4	0	1	21: 6	+15	8: 2
2	Canada	5	2	2	1	20:10	+10	6: 4
3	USA	5	3	0	2	23:16	+ 7	6: 4
4	Sweden	5	2	1	2	26:12	+14	5: 5
5	Switzerland	5	2	1	2	18:17	+ 1	5: 5
6	Austria	5	0	0	5	5:52	-47	0:10

=== Final rankings – World Championships ===
RF	Team
1	Czechoslovakia
2	Canada
3	USA
4	Sweden
5	Switzerland
6	Austria
7	Finland
8	Norway
9	Belgium
10	Denmark

World Championships 1949
Czechoslovakia

==== Team members ====
Pos.	Country	Members
1	CSR	Bohumil Modrý, Josef Jirka, Přemysl Hajný, Oldřich Němec, Josef Trousílek, František Vacovský, Jiří Macelis, Václav Roziňák, Miloslav Charouzd, Vladimír Zábrodský, Stanislav Konopásek, Vladimír Kobranov, Vladimír Bouzek, Gustav Bubník, Zdeněk Marek, František Mizera, Čeněk Pícha

=== Final rankings – European Championships ===
RF	Team
1	Czechoslovakia
2	Sweden
3	Switzerland
4	Austria
5	Finland
6	Norway
7	Belgium
8	Denmark
