= 1947 Ice Hockey World Championships =

1947 edition of the IIHF World Ice Hockey Championship

Tournament details
- Host country: Czechoslovakia
- Venue: 1 (in 1 host city)
- Dates: 15–23 February
- Teams: 8

Final positions
- Champions: Czechoslovakia (1st title)
- Runners-up: Sweden
- Third place: Austria
- Fourth place: Switzerland

Tournament statistics
- Games played: 28
- Goals scored: 337 (12.04 per game)
- Scoring leader: (Czechoslovakia) Vladimír Zábrodský 29 goals

The 1947 Ice Hockey World Championships were the 14th World Championships and 25th European Championship was the first after the Second World War. It was held from 15 to 23 February 1947 at Štvanice Stadium in Prague, Czechoslovakia. Eight teams participated, but the competition was notably missing the reigning world champion, Canada. The world champion was decided for the first time by round robin league play. Czechoslovakia won the world championship for the first time and the European championship for the seventh time. King Gustav V had sent a telegram of congratulations to the Swedish team after beating the Czechoslovaks, but they had barely finished celebrating when they were upset by the Austrians, costing them the gold medal.

== History ==
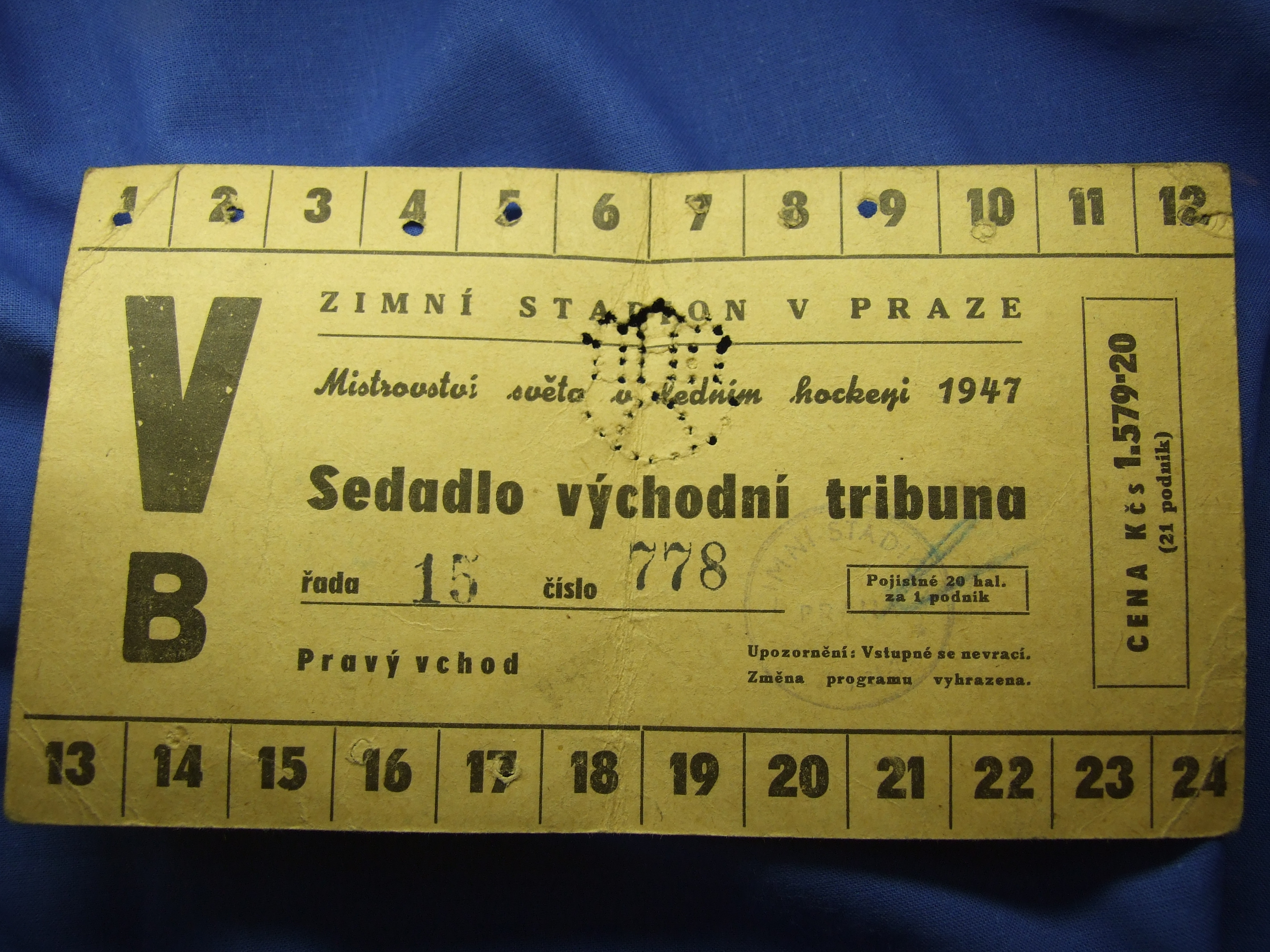
ticket

The 1947 congress of the Ligue Internationale de Hockey sur Glace (LIHG) was the first meeting or the organization since World War II. During the war, the Canadian Amateur Hockey Association (CAHA) united with the Amateur Hockey Association of the United States (AHAUS) to form the International Ice Hockey Association, and invited the British Ice Hockey Association to join. The new group was led by CAHA president W. G. Hardy, and was a means of shifting the control of world hockey from Europe to Canada.

The CAHA severed its ties to the LIHG in 1944, and pledged allegiance to the International Ice Hockey Association instead, and a closer relationship to AHAUS. The CAHA and AHAUS agreed in 1946 to propose a merger with the LIHG to oversee international ice hockey. The proposal sought for the Ice Hockey World Championships to alternate between Europe and North America, with the Olympic hockey tournaments played under the same rules as the CAHA and the National Hockey League. The CAHA attended the LIHG meeting during the 1947 championships, and pushed for the definition of amateur to be anyone not actively engaged in professional sport. The LIHG agreed to a merger where the presidency would alternate between North America and Europe every three years, and recognized AHAUS as the governing body of hockey in the United States instead of the Amateur Athletic Union. The CAHA was permitted to have its own definition of amateur as long as teams at the Olympic games adhered to existing LIHG rules.

Many notable changes were made to the rules for this championship. The game was standardized to be played in three 20 minute periods, aligning with the Canadian practice. The net size was standardized as well. There would be no more one- and three-minute penalties, and penalty shots were instituted.

Japan and Germany were barred from participation, but the LIHG was careful to illustrate that it was the politics, not the people, who were at fault, and allies like Austria and Italy were admitted.

== 1947 World Ice Hockey Championships (Prague, Czechoslovakia) ==
=== Game results ===
15. February 1947	Zimní stadión Štvanice, Prague	Austria	–	Poland	10:2 (3:1,2:1,5:0)
15. February 1947	Zimní stadión Štvanice, Prague	Czechoslovakia	–	Romania	23:1 (4:0,7:1,12:0)
15. February 1947	Zimní stadión Štvanice, Prague	Sweden	–	Switzerland	4:4 (2:2,1:0,1:2)
16. February 1947	Zimní stadión Štvanice, Prague	Sweden	–	Belgium	24:1 (8:0,7:1,9:0)
16. February 1947	Zimní stadión Štvanice, Prague	Poland	–	Romania	6:0 (2:0,1:0,3:0)
16. February 1947	Zimní stadión Štvanice, Prague	USA	–	Switzerland	4:3 (0:0,3:2,1:1)
17. February 1947	Zimní stadión Štvanice, Prague	Austria	–	Belgium	14:5 (2:0,6:0,6:5)
17. February 1947	Zimní stadión Štvanice, Prague	Switzerland	–	Romania	13:3 (7:0,0:2,6:1)
17. February 1947	Zimní stadión Štvanice, Prague	Sweden	–	USA	4:1 (1:0,2:0,1:1)
18. February 1947	Zimní stadión Štvanice, Prague	Czechoslovakia	–	Austria	13:5 (2:3,6:0,5:2)
18. February 1947	Zimní stadión Štvanice, Prague	USA	–	Belgium	13:2 (5:1,5:0,3:1)
18. February 1947	Zimní stadión Štvanice, Prague	Sweden	–	Poland	5:3 (0:1,4:1,1:1)
19. February 1947	Zimní stadión Štvanice, Prague	Austria	–	USA	6:5 (2:1,2:3,2:1)
19. February 1947	Zimní stadión Štvanice, Prague	Sweden	–	Romania	15:3 (6:2,6:0,3:1)
19. February 1947	Zimní stadión Štvanice, Prague	Czechoslovakia	–	Poland	12:0 (3:0,2:0,7:0)
19. February 1947	Zimní stadión Štvanice, Prague	Switzerland	–	Belgium	12:2 (3:1,7:0,2:1)
20. February 1947	Zimní stadión Štvanice, Prague	USA	–	Romania	15:3 (6:0,3:1,6:2)
20. February 1947	Zimní stadión Štvanice, Prague	Poland	–	Belgium	11:1 (1:0,6:0,4:1)
20. February 1947	Zimní stadión Štvanice, Prague	Czechoslovakia	–	Switzerland	6:1 (2:1,2:0,2:0)
21. February 1947	Zimní stadión Štvanice, Prague	Austria	–	Romania	12:1 (2:0,5:0,5:1)
21. February 1947	Zimní stadión Štvanice, Prague	USA	–	Poland	3:2 (1:0,1:2,1:0)
21. February 1947	Zimní stadión Štvanice, Prague	Czechoslovakia	–	Belgium	24:0 (9:0,5:0,10:0)
22. February 1947	Zimní stadión Štvanice, Prague	Romania	–	Belgium	6:4 (2:1,3:0,1:3)
22. February 1947	Zimní stadión Štvanice, Prague	Switzerland	–	Austria	5:0 (3:0,0:0,2:0)
22. February 1947	Zimní stadión Štvanice, Prague	Czechoslovakia	–	Sweden	1:2 (0:1,0:1,1:0)
23. February 1947	Zimní stadión Štvanice, Prague	Switzerland	–	Poland	9:3 (3:1,1:0,5:2)
23. February 1947	Zimní stadión Štvanice, Prague	Austria	–	Sweden	2:1 (1:0,0:0,1:1)
23. February 1947	Zimní stadión Štvanice, Prague	Czechoslovakia	–	USA	6:1 (2:0,1:1,3:0)

=== Final standings ===
Pos	Team	Pld	W	D	L	GF	GA	GD	Pts
1	Czechoslovakia	7	6	0	1	85	10	+75	12
2	Sweden	7	5	1	1	55	15	+40	11
3	Austria	7	5	0	2	49	32	+17	10
4	Switzerland	7	4	1	2	47	22	+25	9
5	United States	7	4	0	3	42	26	+16	8
6	Poland	7	2	0	5	27	40	−13	4
7	Romania	7	1	0	6	17	88	−71	2
8	Belgium	7	0	0	7	15	104	−89	0

World Champion 1947
Czechoslovakia

==== Team members ====
Pos.	Country	Members
1	CSR	Bohumil Modrý, Zdeněk Jarkovský, Josef Trousílek, Vilibald Šťovík, František Pácalt, Miroslav Sláma, Miloslav Pokorný, Ladislav Troják, Vladimír Zábrodský, Stanislav Konopásek, Josef Kus, Jaroslav Drobný, Karel Stibor, Václav Roziňák, Vladimír Bouzek

=== Final rankings -- European Championship ===
1st place, gold medalist(s)	Czechoslovakia
2nd place, silver medalist(s)	Sweden
3rd place, bronze medalist(s)	Austria
4	Switzerland
5	Poland
6	Romania
7	Belgium

1947 European Champion
Czechoslovakia
