= Slachta =

Slachta or Šlachta is a surname. Notable people with the surname include:

- Daniel Šlachta (1923–2007), Slovak alpine skier.
- Margit Slachta (1884–1974), Hungarian nun, social activist, and politician
- Robert Šlachta (born 1971), Czech politician
