= Vít Fousek =

Vít Fousek can refer to:

- Vít Fousek Sr. (1913–1990), Czech cross-country skier
- Vít Fousek Jr. (born 1940), Czech cross-country skier
