= Gordon Bruce =

Gordon Bruce may refer to:

- Gordon Bruce (politician) (1930–1995), South Australian politician
- Gordie Bruce (1919–1997), Canadian ice hockey player
