= Zdeněk Marek =

Czech-born American ice hockey player (1925–2019)

- Born: October 15, 1925 Prostějov, Czechoslovakia
- Died: March 29, 2019 (aged 93) Kingston, New York, USA
- Position: Center
- Played for: North Dakota
- National team: Czechoslovakia
- Playing career: 1945–1951
Medal record
World Championship
Gold medal – first place	1949 Stockholm	Ice hockey

Zdeněk Rudolph "Zee" Marek (October 15, 1925 – March 29, 2019) was a Czechoslovakia-born American ice hockey center who won a gold medal at the 1949 Ice Hockey World Championships before defecting to the United States.

== Career ==
Marek was a rising star for Czechoslovakia after World War II, playing for his local team as well as HC Sparta Praha. After the Czech national team lost six players to a plane crash in November 1948, he was selected for the team's appearance at the 1949 Ice Hockey World Championships. The Czech team was looking to repeat its gold medal from 1947 and rebound from losing the silver to Canada at the 1948 Winter Olympics. Marek only played in two games, scoring one goal, but the team was able to win the gold with an unbeaten record.

During the tournament Marek had befriended two American players, Buzz Johnson and his brother Milt, and had told them that he didn't want to return home because he was not a member of the Communist Party and feared what would happen to him in the future. The brothers, who both attended the University of North Dakota agreed to help him apply for a student visa with their alma mater so he could defect to the United States. After the tournament Marek hid in Stockholm and awaited news of the plan. During his stay in Sweden he appeared briefly for Hammarby. In July 1949 North Dakota not only agreed to admit Marek, but provided him with a free scholarship as well. This allowed Marek to travel to the US on a student visa and began attending school that fall.

There was one problem, however; because the immigrant quota from Czechoslovakia had already been reached and surpassed, Marek did not automatically qualify for resident status in the US. Because his initial filings with the INS lacked sufficient reason to grant Marek's case special circumstances, according to then-Deputy Attorney General Peyton Ford, the initial recommendation was to deny Marek a visa. Despite this recommendation, the US Senate passed bill S. 178 on May 28, 1951, to grant permanent resident status to Marek upon receipt of a head tax and visa fee.

At that time Marek had completed his sophomore season for North Dakota and had taken to being called "Stan" rather than Zdeněk. After becoming a permanent resident, Marek never again played organized hockey but he did remain at North Dakota to earn his degree. After graduating, Marek moved to New York and began designing women's dresses. He eventually founded his own label, Marek Inc., and served as a private designer for department stores on Fifth Avenue. Though he left hockey in his past, Marek remained an avid athlete into his retirement, winning the New York State Tennis championship for 75+ men in 2001.

Marek died of natural causes near his long-time home of Phoenicia, New York in 2019.

== Statistics ==
=== Regular season and playoffs ===
			Regular season					Playoffs
Season	Team	League	GP	G	A	Pts	PIM	GP	G	A	Pts	PIM
1945–46	CSSZ Prostějov	Czech Extraliga	—	2	—	—	—	—	—	—	—	—
1947–48	AC Sparta Praha	Czech Extraliga	5	7	—	—	—	—	—	—	—	—
1948–49	ATK Praha	Czech Extraliga	—	—	—	—	—	—	—	—	—	—
1948–49	Hammarby IF	Swedish Division I	1	1	—	—	—	—	—	—	—	—
1950–51	North Dakota	NCAA	24	15	19	34	22	—	—	—	—	—

=== International ===
Year	Team	GP	G	A	Pts	PIM
1949	Czechoslovakia	2	1	0	1	0
