= Radňovice =

- Municipality
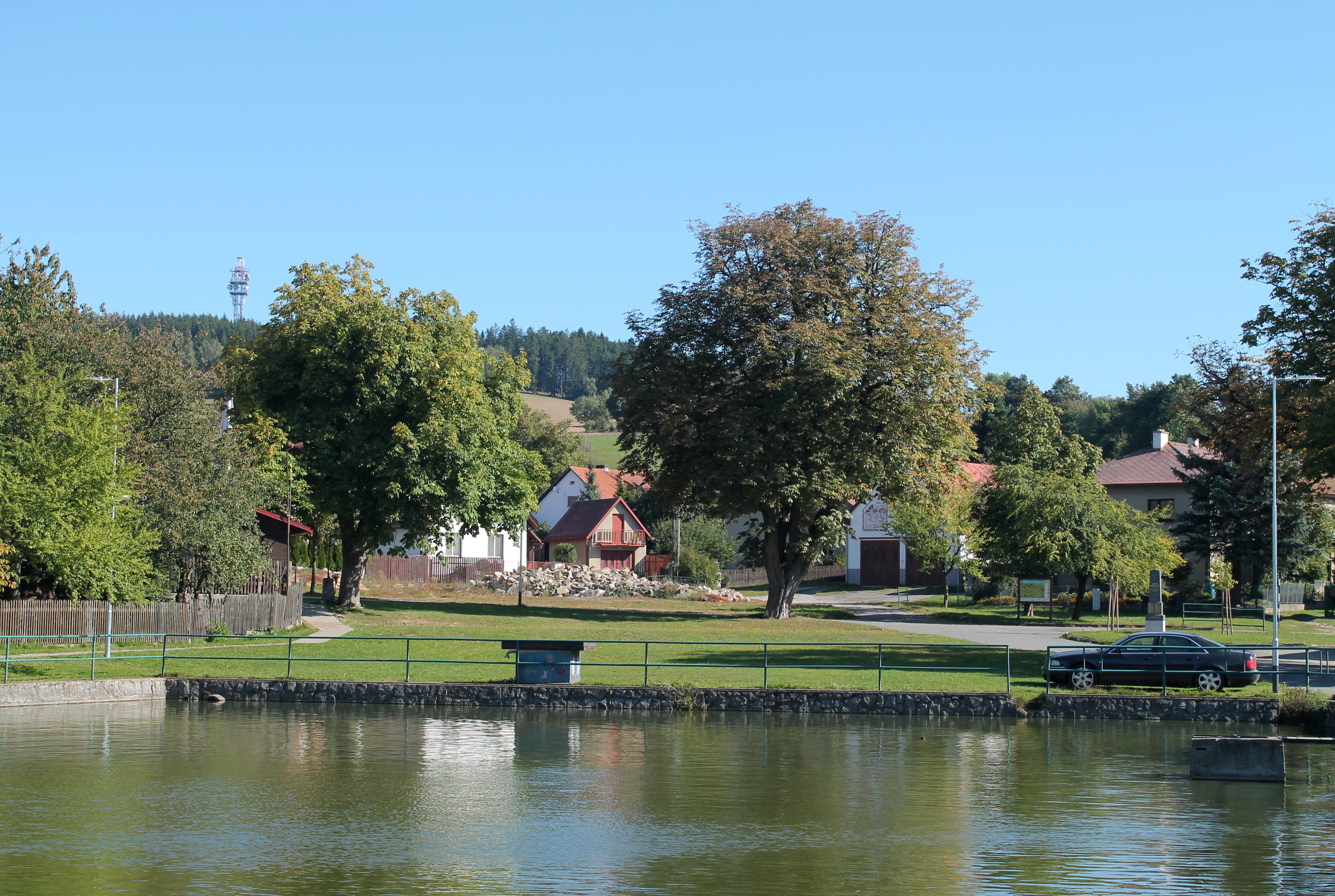
- Centre of Radňovice

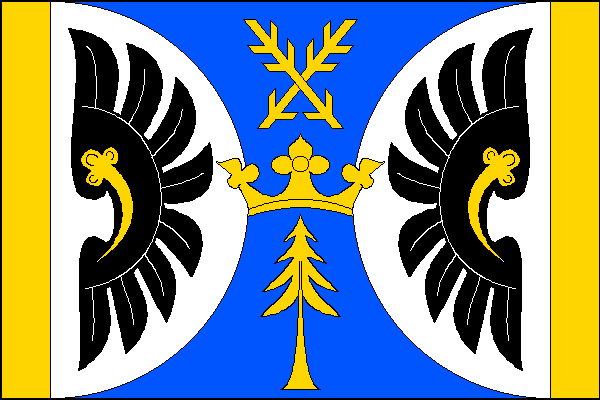
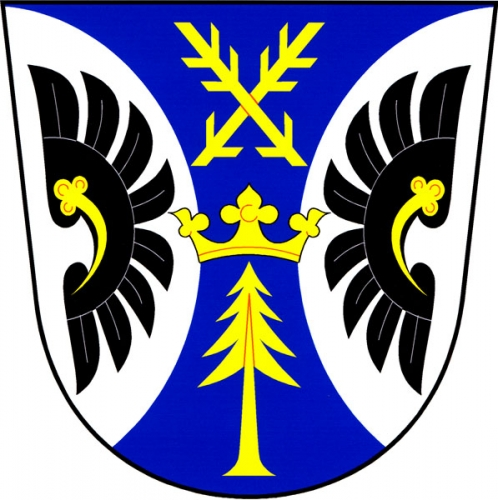
- Flag Coat of arms

- Location in the Czech Republic
- Coordinates: 49°33′51″N 16°2′6″E
- Country: Czech Republic
- Region: Vysočina
- District: Žďár nad Sázavou
- First mentioned: 1269

Area
  - Total: 3.87 km^{2} (1.49 sq mi)
- Elevation: 627 m (2,057 ft)

Population (2026-01-01)
  - Total: 338
  - Density: 87.3/km^{2} (226/sq mi)
- Time zone: UTC+1 (CET)
  - Summer (DST): UTC+2 (CEST)
- Postal code: 592 31
- Website: radnovice.cz

Radňovice is a municipality and village in Žďár nad Sázavou District in the Vysočina Region of the Czech Republic. It has about 300 inhabitants.

Radňovice lies approximately 7 kilometres (4 mi) east of Žďár nad Sázavou, 38 kilometres (24 mi) north-east of Jihlava, and 130 kilometres (81 mi) south-east of Prague.

== Demographics ==
Historical population
Year	Pop.	±%
1869	380	—
1880	397	+4.5%
1890	380	−4.3%
1900	349	−8.2%
1910	349	+0.0%
1921	368	+5.4%
1930	286	−22.3%
1950	318	+11.2%
1961	317	−0.3%
1970	297	−6.3%
1980	333	+12.1%
1991	339	+1.8%
2001	330	−2.7%
2011	324	−1.8%
2021	287	−11.4%
Source: Censuses

== Notable people ==
- František Zajíček (1912–1987), bobsledder
- Bohumil Kosour (1913–1997), soldier and skier
- Jaroslav Zajíček (1920–2002), cross-country skier
