= František Zajíček =

Czechoslovak bobsledder

František Zajíček (15 November 1912 in Radňovice – 19 January 1987) was a Czechoslovak bobsledder who competed in the late 1940s. At the 1948 Winter Olympics in St. Moritz, he finished 14th in the four-man event. His brother is Jaroslav Zajíček.
