= Štvanice Stadium =

Former sports stadium in Prague, Czechia

Štvanice stadium
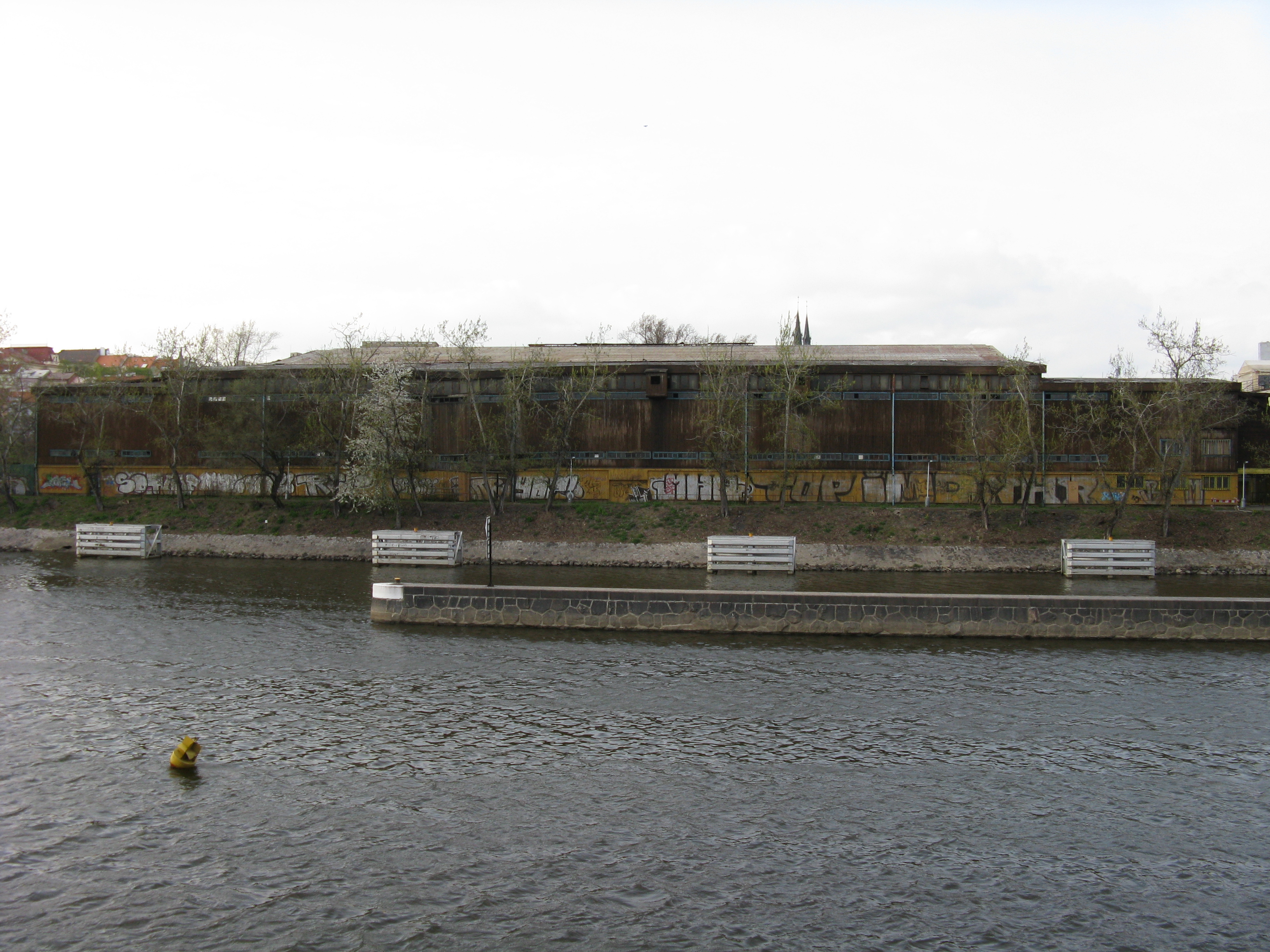
- View of the stadium from south over the Vltava
- Interactive map of Štvanice stadium
- Location: Prague, Czech Republic
- Coordinates: 50.0952565°N 14.4353646°E

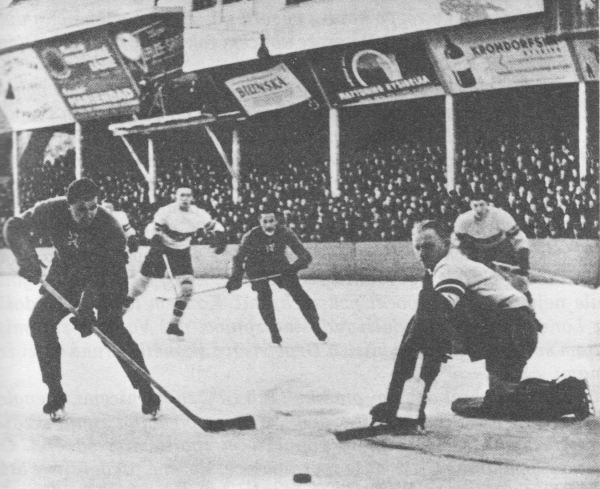
Czechoslovakia – Germany match at Štvanice stadium (1938)

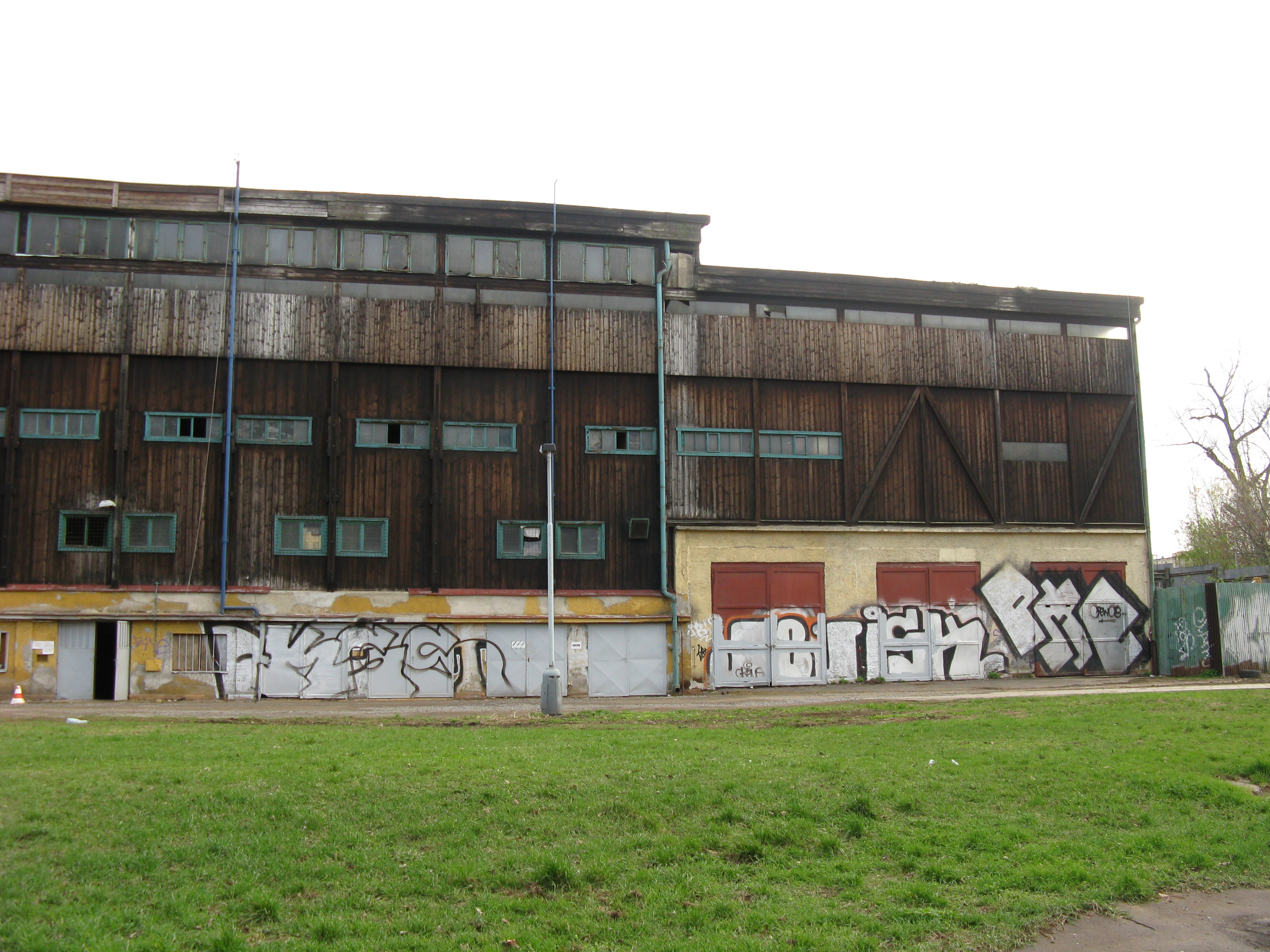
Štvanice stadium in 2011

Štvanice stadium was a sports stadium situated on Štvanice Island, Czech Republic, and was ranked among the oldest stadiums in Prague. The stadium was in its heyday in the first half of the 20th century, but has been in decline since 1961. It was here, where in 1947 the Czechoslovak national team won the Ice Hockey World Championship for the first time.

== Early days ==
Czech national ice hockey teams at first had to win five European titles, before players finally saw their first stadium with artificial ice rink. The stadium was built in the early 1930s and was entirely made of wood. On 17 January 1931, the first hockey match on the synthetic ice was played. After this, Štvanice stadium became the Ice skating centre of Prague for 30 years and countless numbers of hockey-players and figure skaters were brought up there.

The Štvanice stadium hosted four Ice Hockey World Championships. The Czechoslovak ice hockey team won a medal on each occasion:

- 1933 (bronze)
- 1938 (bronze)
- 1947 (gold)
- 1959 (bronze).

The next important date for the Stadium was 11 February 1955. The first televised hockey match was broadcast on this day.

== Decline of Štvanice Arena ==
In 1961 a new arena at the fairground became home to HC Sparta Prague, although they continued to play there occasionally when booking conflicts arose. Subsequently, the rink at Štvanice started to grow old and waste away, and the stadium was only used by regional ice hockey clubs and for public skating. After several years the stadium had to be closed due to poor repair. In 2000 Štvanice Arena was proclaimed a national cultural monument and was protected by the state.

In the 2002 European floods, a big part of the stadium was damaged. It was reopened in October 2002.

In 2008 the city denounced the contract to tenants due to not meeting contractual obligations to care. According to the report there was the danger of a structural collapse. Štvanice Stadium was finally demolished in May 2011.
