= Pat McReavy =

Canadian ice hockey player

- Born: January 16, 1918 Owen Sound, Ontario, Canada
- Died: November 13, 2001 (aged 83) Owen Sound, Ontario, Canada
- Height: 5 ft 11 in (180 cm)
- Weight: 165 lb (75 kg; 11 st 11 lb)
- Position: Centre
- Shot: Right
- Played for: Boston Bruins; Detroit Red Wings
- National team: Canada
- Playing career: 1938–1947

Pat McReavy
Medal record

Men's ice hockey

Representing Canada

World Championships
Gold medal – first place	1938 Czechoslovakia	

Patrick Joseph McReavy (January 16, 1918 – November 13, 2001) was a Canadian professional ice hockey player who played 55 games in the National Hockey League with the Boston Bruins and Detroit Red Wings between 1938 and 1942. The rest of his career, which lasted from 1938 to 1952, was spent in various minor leagues.

In 1939, he played in six regular season games for the Bruins, never appearing in the playoffs, but Boston still engraved his name on the Stanley Cup. He would win the Stanley Cup again with the Bruins in 1941, scoring two goals in the postseason. To date, McReavy is the only Bruin in the team's long history to score two playoff goals while never scoring a regular-season goal for the club. Pat McReavy name was often misspelled Pat McCreavy on team pictures, roster lists, Stanley Cup, hockey books; etc.

As a member of the Sudbury Wolves he played for Canada at the 1938 World Championships, scoring 2 goals and 1 assist in 7 games and winning the gold medal. McReavy was born in Owen Sound, Ontario.

== Career statistics ==
=== Regular season and playoffs ===
			Regular season					Playoffs
Season	Team	League	GP	G	A	Pts	PIM	GP	G	A	Pts	PIM
1935–36	St. Michael's Majors	OHA	10	8	9	17	2	5	2	3	5	2
1936–37	Copper Cliff Jr. Redmen	NOJHA	4	5	4	9	4	—	—	—	—	—
1936–37	Copper Cliff Reds U18	NOHA	14	7	7	14	12	—	—	—	—	—
1936–37	Copper Cliff Jr. Redmen	M-Cup	—	—	—	—	—	12	15	21	36	10
1937–38	Sudbury Wolves	NOHA	1	0	0	0	0	—	—	—	—	—
1938–39	Boston Bruins	NHL	6	0	0	0	0	—	—	—	—	—
1938–39	Providence Reds	IAHL	47	11	16	27	23	5	0	1	1	0
1939–40	Boston Bruins	NHL	2	0	0	0	2	—	—	—	—	—
1939–40	Hershey Bears	IAHL	53	16	17	33	8	6	2	3	5	2
1940–41	Boston Bruins	NHL	7	0	1	1	2	11	2	2	4	5
1940–41	Hershey Bears	AHL	51	21	25	46	2	2	1	0	1	0
1941–42	Boston Bruins	NHL	7	0	1	1	0	—	—	—	—	—
1941–42	Detroit Red Wings	NHL	33	5	6	11	0	11	1	1	2	4
1942–43	Montreal RCAF	QSHL	14	2	4	6	8	—	—	—	—	—
1942–43	Toronto RCAF	OHA Sr	1	0	1	1	0	—	—	—	—	—
1943–44	Montreal RCAF	QSHL	7	2	2	4	2	—	—	—	—	—
1944–45	Valleyfield Braves	QPHL	3	2	2	4	0	—	—	—	—	—
1945–46	St. Louis Flyers	AHL	46	22	28	50	11	—	—	—	—	—
1946–47	St. Louis Flyers	AHL	64	18	29	47	21	—	—	—	—	—
1947–48	Owen Sound Mercurys	OHA Sr	27	20	28	48	2	5	3	7	10	0
1948–49	Owen Sound Mercurys	OHA Sr	39	17	22	39	4	4	1	4	5	0
1949–50	Owen Sound Mercurys	OHA Sr	42	26	25	51	6	—	—	—	—	—
1950–51	Owen Sound Mercurys	OHA Sr	—	—	—	—	—	—	—	—	—	—
1950–51	Owen Sound Mercurys	Al-Cup	—	—	—	—	—	16	7	17	24	6
1951–52	Owen Sound Mercurys	OHA Sr	—	—	—	—	—	1	0	0	0	0
IAHL/AHL totals			261	88	115	203	65	13	3	4	7	2
NHL totals			55	5	8	13	4	22	3	3	6	9

=== International ===
Year	Team	Event	GP	G	A	Pts	PIM
1938	Canada	WC	7	2	0	2	—
Senior totals			7	2	0	2	—
