= Štvanice =

Island in Prague, Czech Republic

Native name: Štvanice
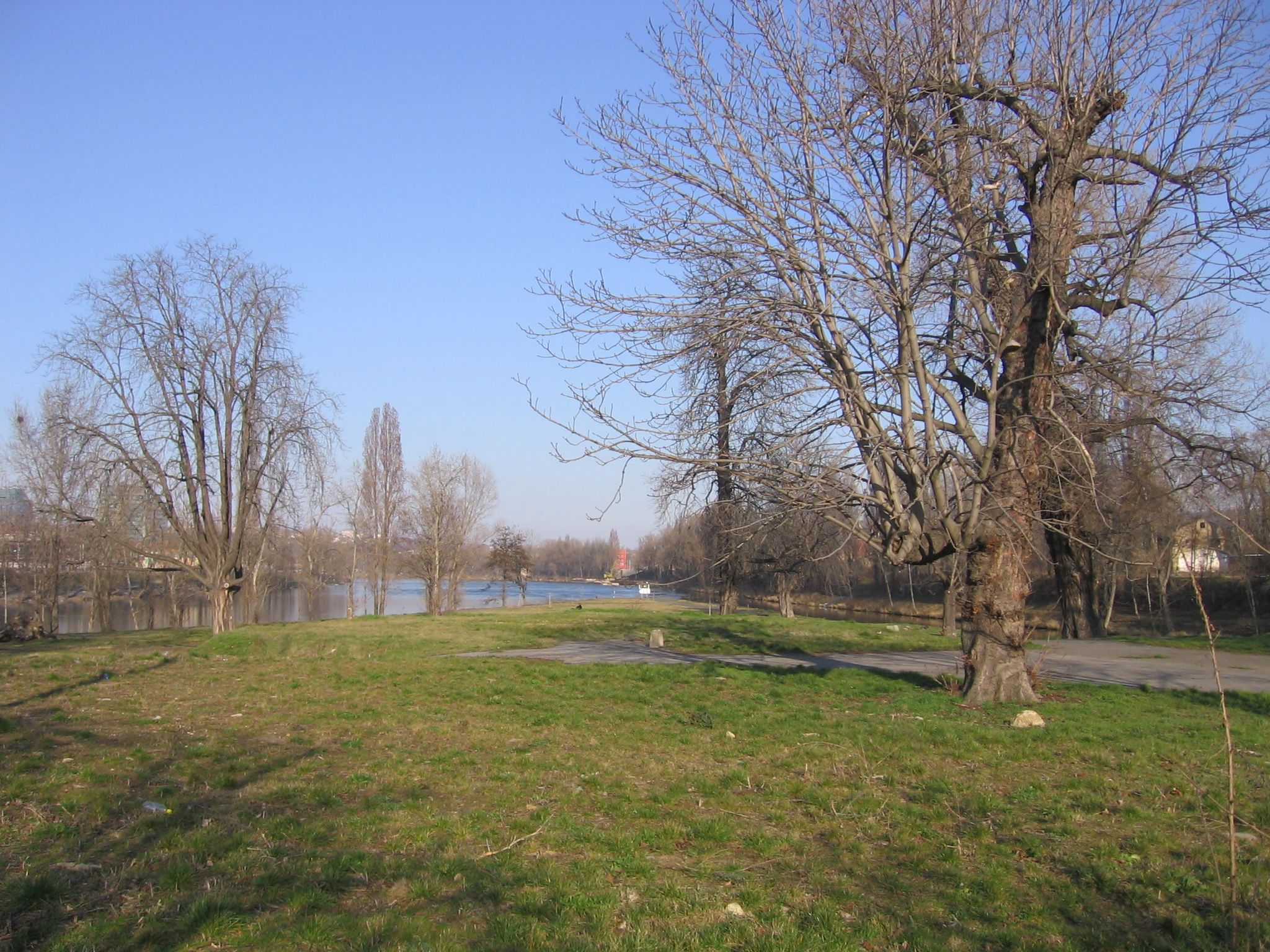
- Eastern part of the island
- Interactive map of Štvanice

Geography
- Location: Vltava
- Coordinates: 50°5′45″N 14°26′17″E

Administration
- Czech Republic

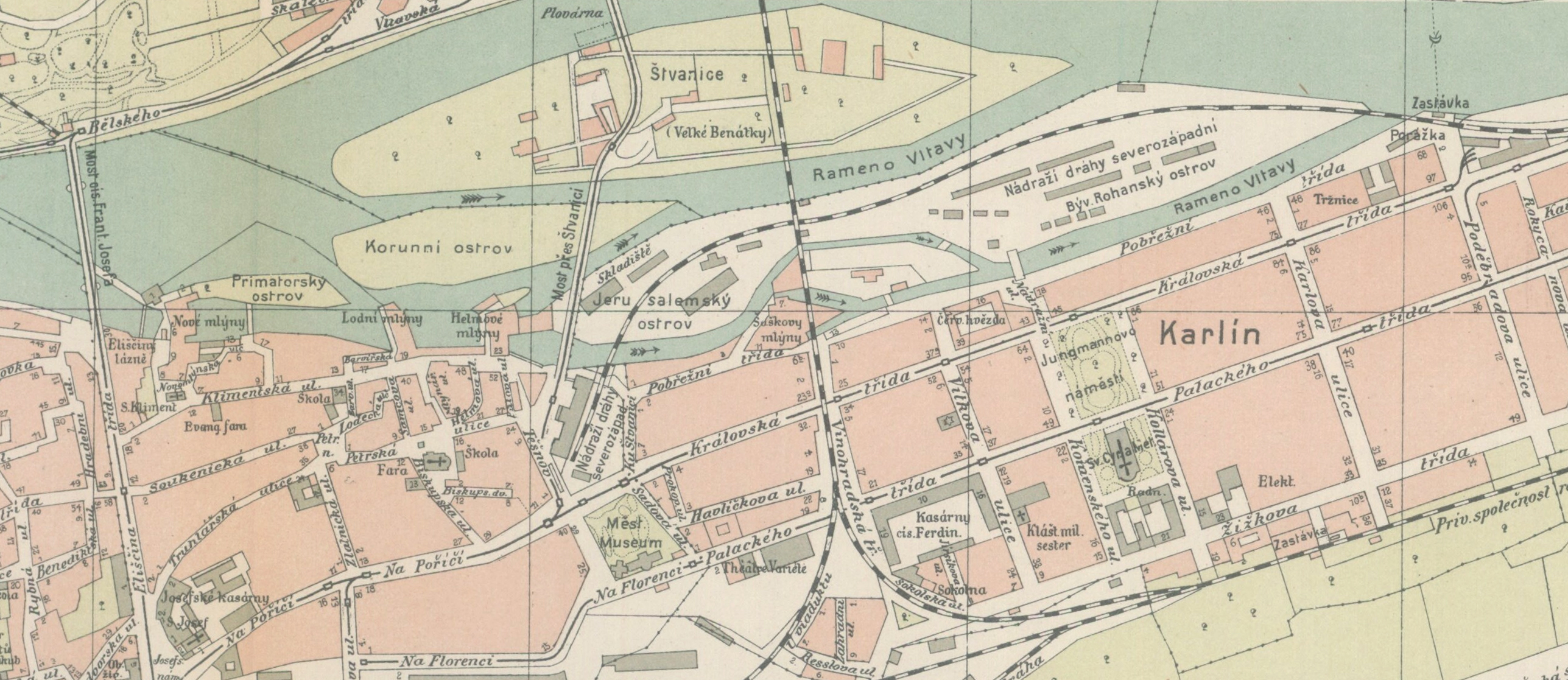
Štvanice island in 1910

Štvanice is an island on the Vltava river in Prague, Czech Republic. It is located in the Prague district of Holešovice. At the end of the 17th century, a wooden arena was built there. Until 1816, the island was used for dog hunts involving various animals such as bears, bulls, deer, and cows, although these were repeatedly banned. This is the origin of the island's name, which translates to hunt or chase.

In 1931, Štvanice Stadium was built on the island and originally consisted entirely of wood. This later became the ice skating centre of Prague, until its demolition in 2011. Ice Hockey World Championships were held at the stadium four times: in 1933, 1938, 1947, and 1959. It was here that in 1947, the Czechoslovakia men's national ice hockey team won the world championship for the first time.

In 1986, an arena for the I. ČLTK Prague tennis club was built on Štvanice, with nine outdoor and two indoor courts. The central court has a capacity of 8,000 seats and is the annual site of the ATP and WTA Prague Open tournaments.

The island also has a roofed skatepark and as such, it is the only place that allows year-round skateboarding in Prague. In 2006, a neighbouring indoor skate bowl was added to the facility. The Mystic Sk8 Cup event, held there since 1994, is part of the World Cup of Skateboarding tour.

In the eastern part of the island, there used to be a public swimming pool, which in the 1990s had a nudist resort. This was of interest for being set up almost directly in the centre of Prague, near a hydropower plant and an adjustable water slalom track. The island is spanned by Hlávkův Bridge, the Negrelli Viaduct, and since 2023, a footbridge open to pedestrians and cyclists.

== Gallery ==
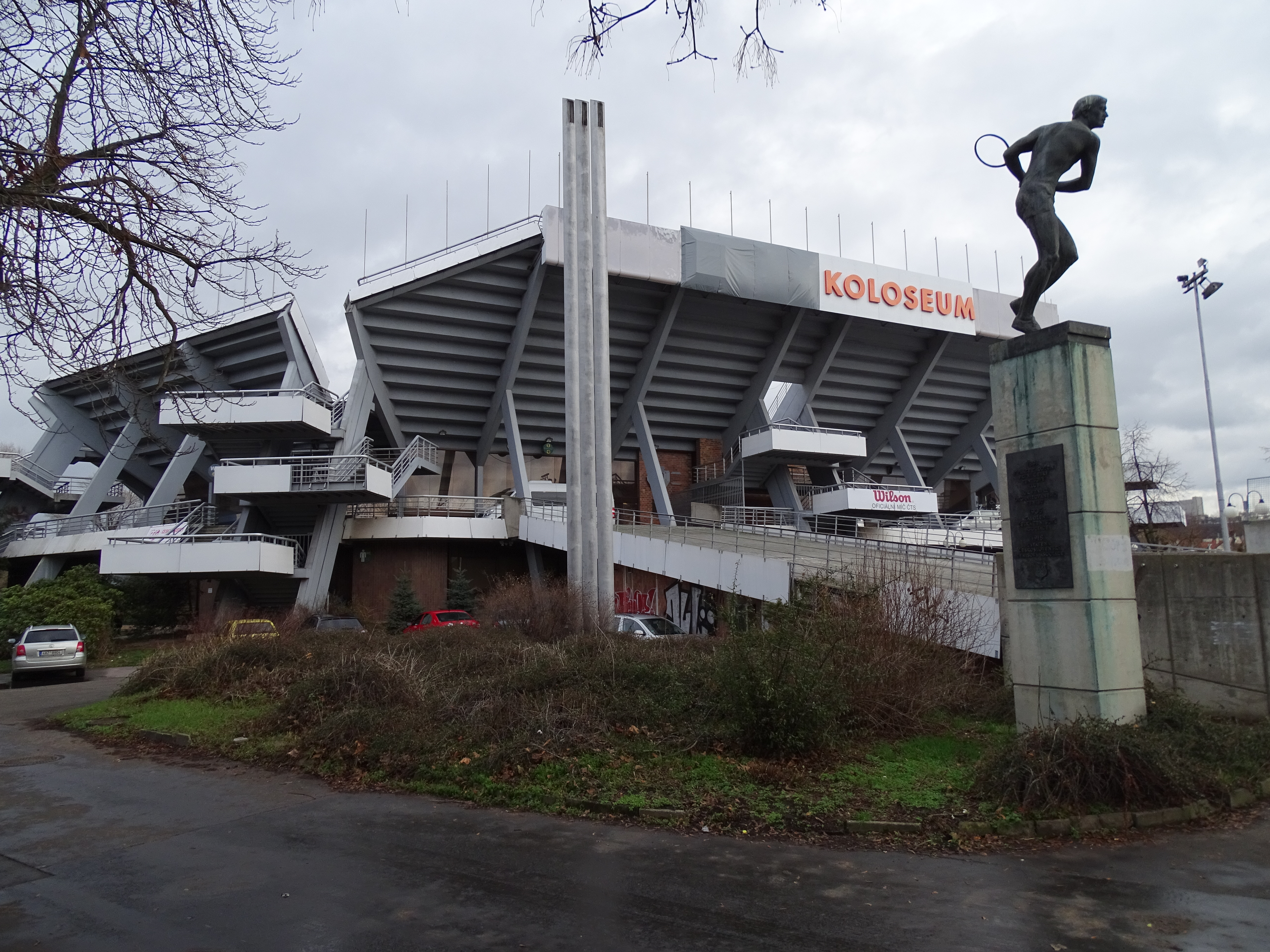
Štvanice tennis arena

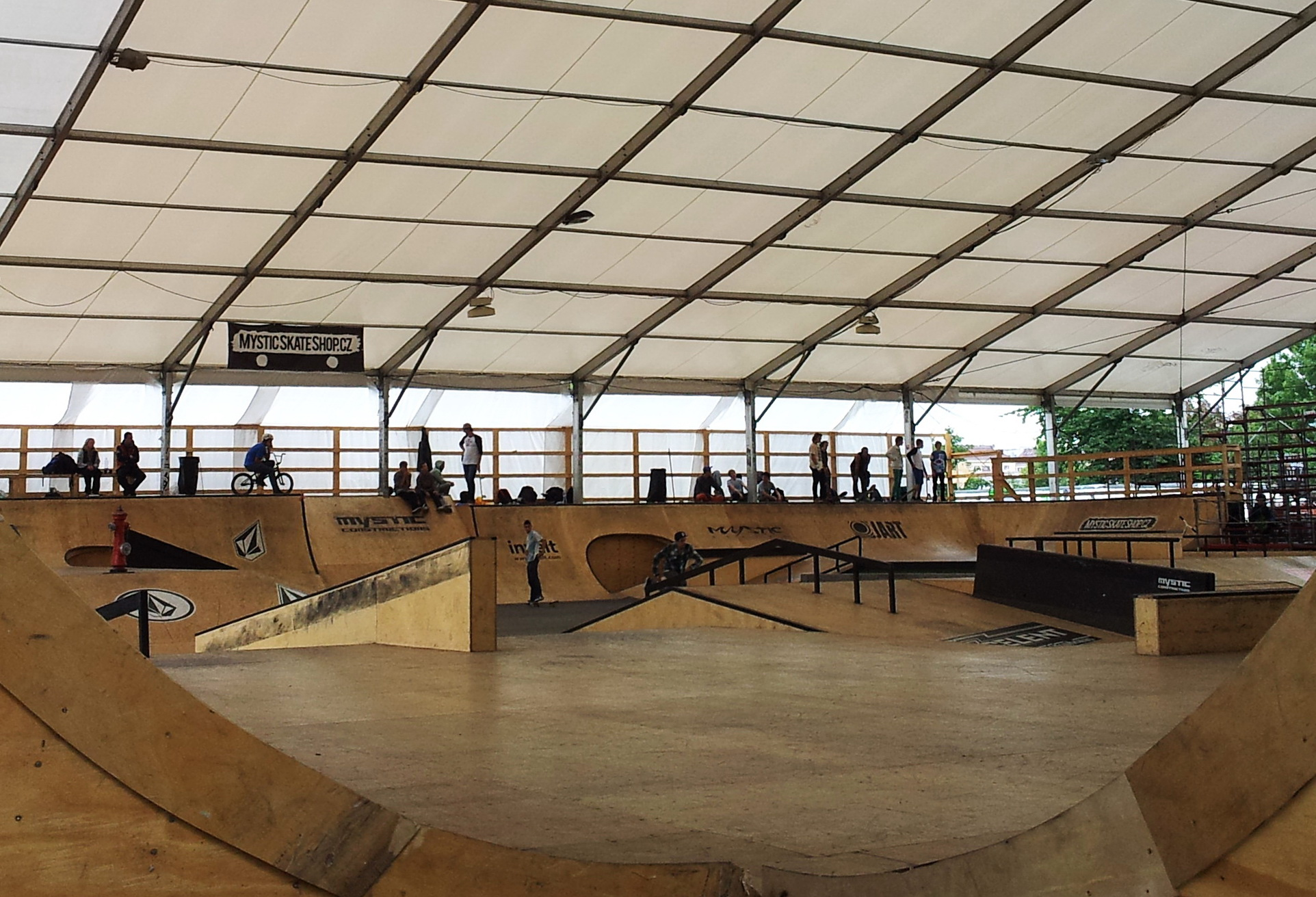
Štvanice skatepark

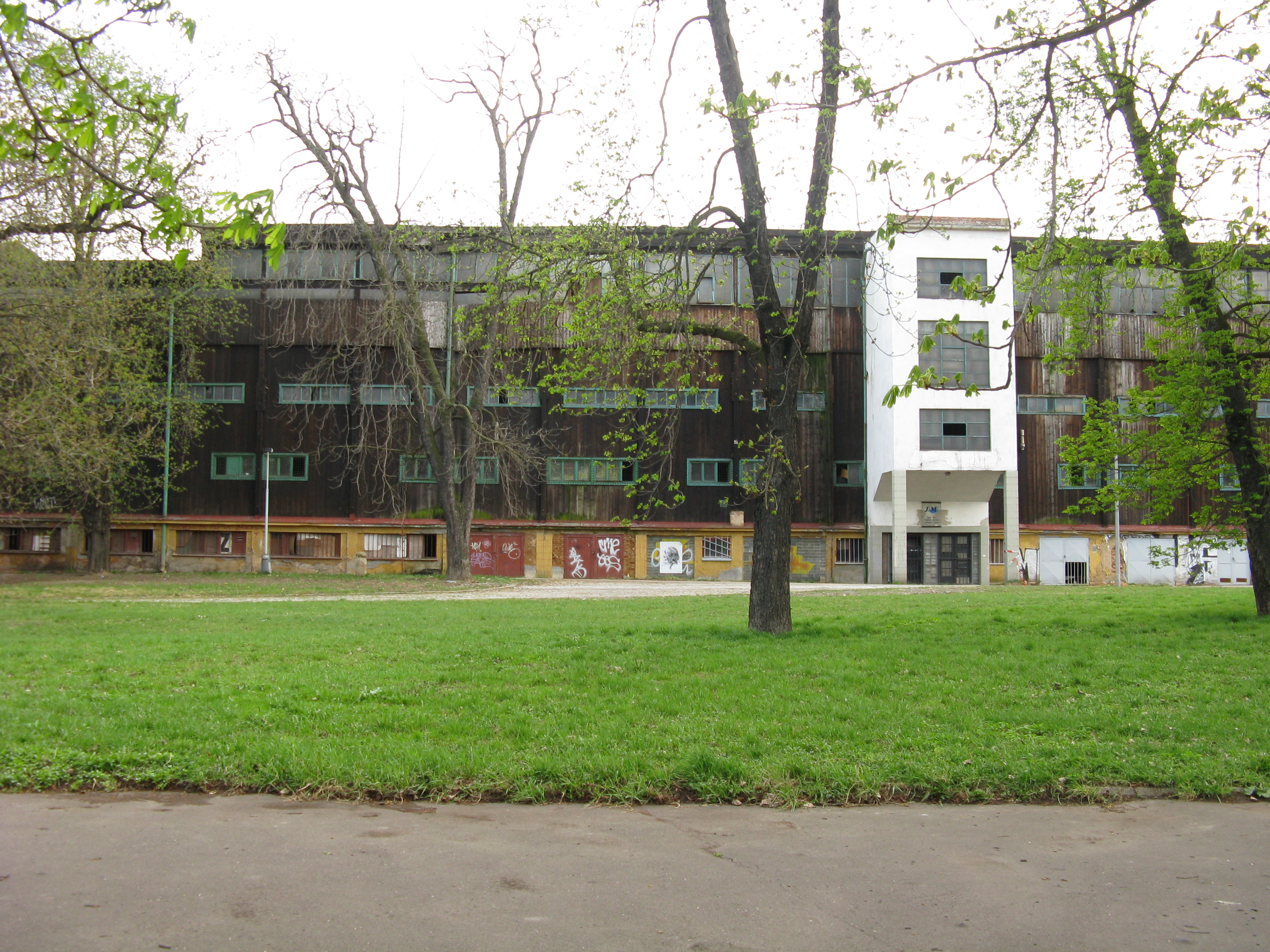
Former winter stadium of Štvanice, shortly before demolition

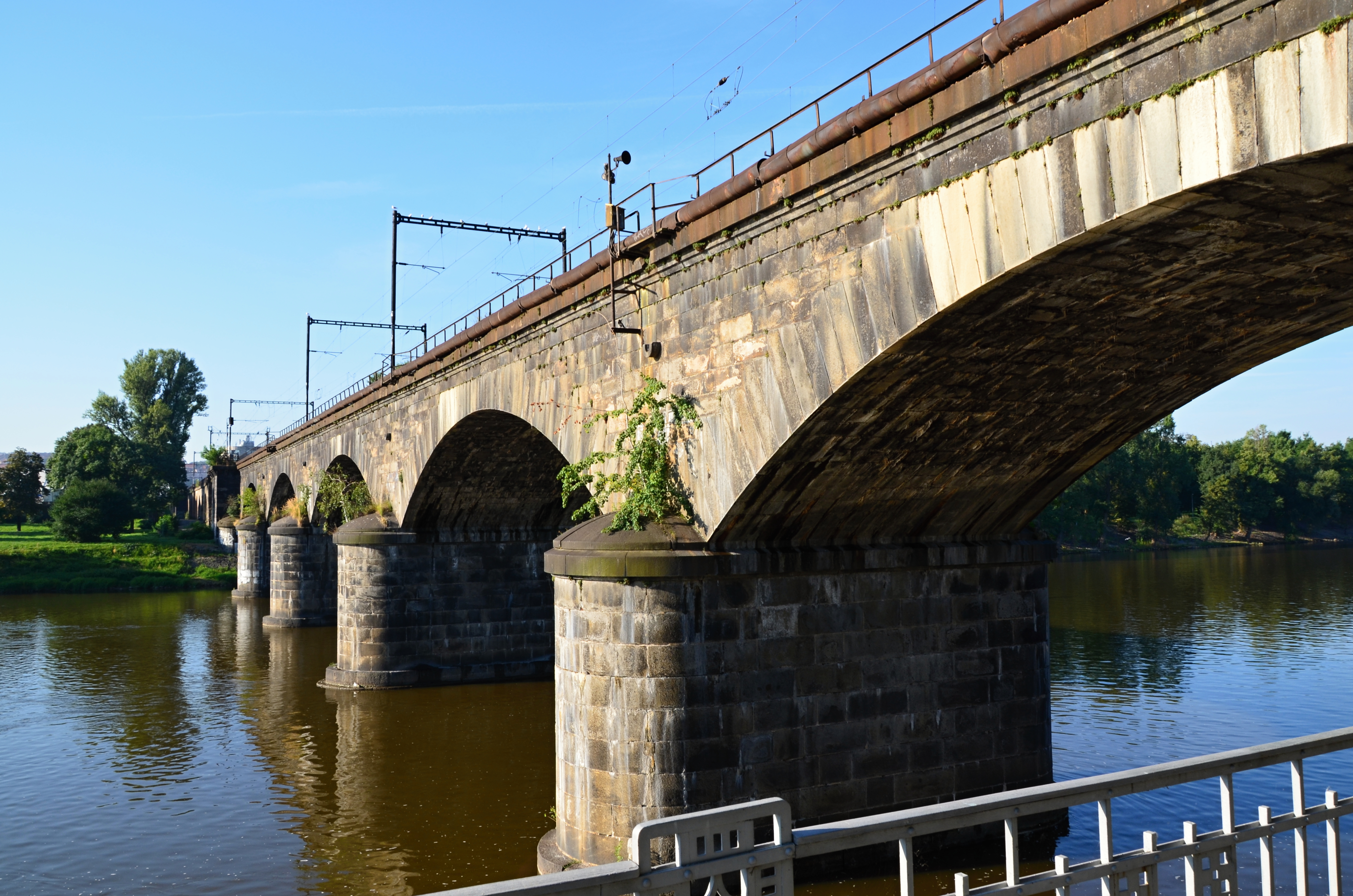
Negrelli viaduct

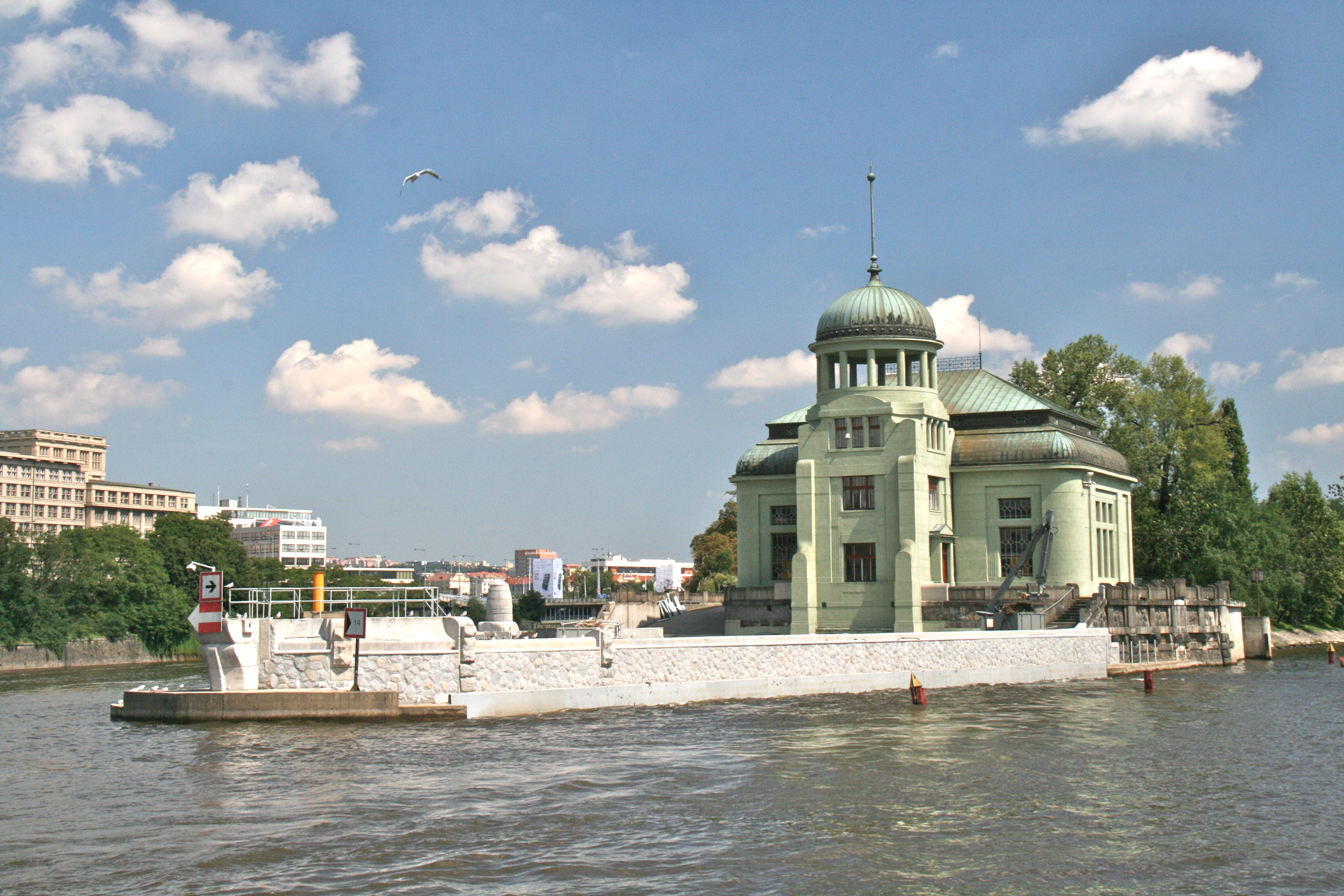
Hydropower plant

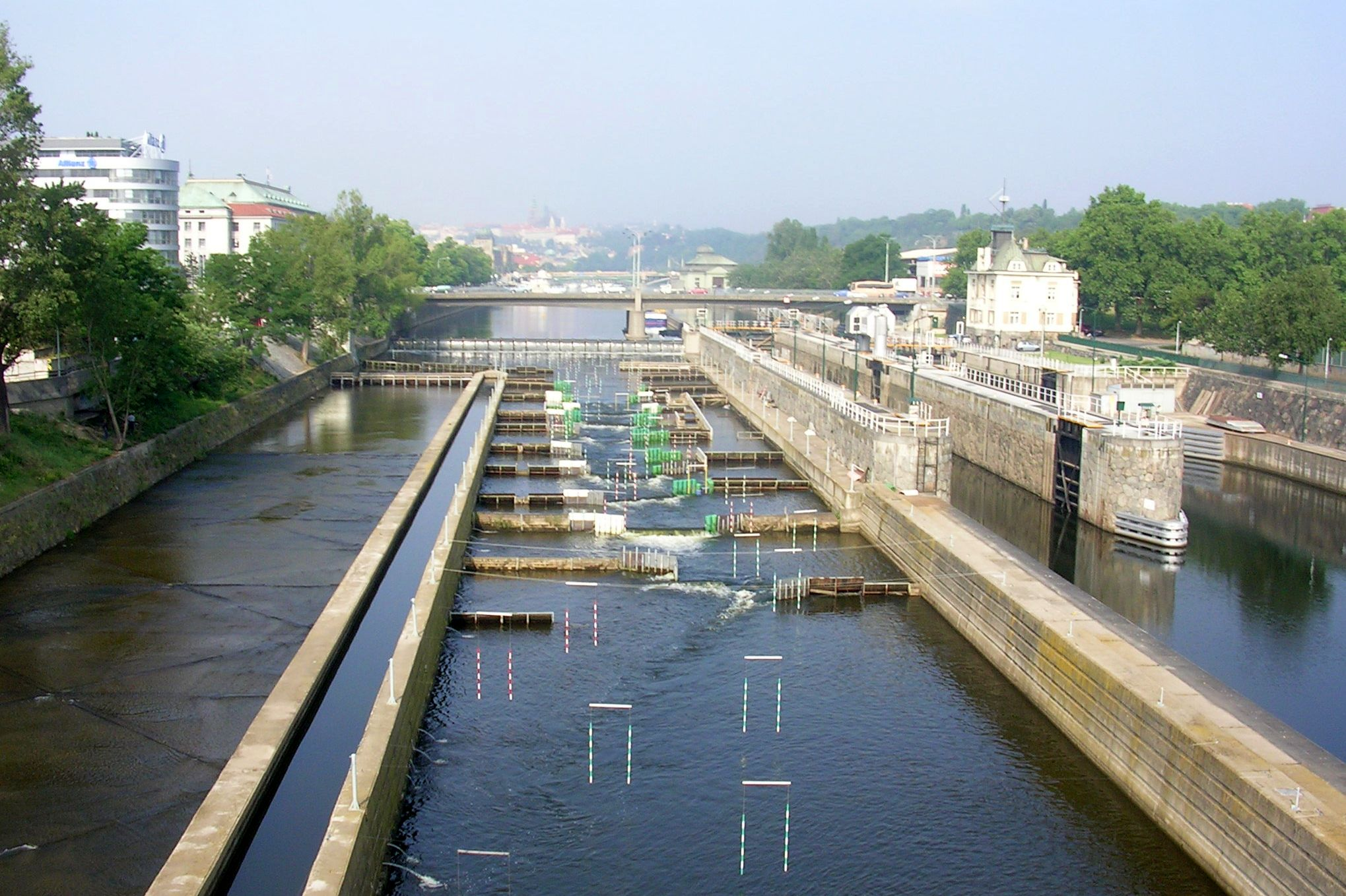
Slalom channel on Štvanice and hydropower plant (right)
