= 1938 Ice Hockey World Championships =

1938 edition of the World Ice Hockey Championship

Tournament details
- Host country: Czechoslovakia
- Venue: 1 (in 1 host city)
- Dates: 11–20 February
- Teams: 14

Final positions
- Champions: Canada (10th title)
- Runners-up: Great Britain
- Third place: Czechoslovakia
- Fourth place: Germany

Tournament statistics
- Games played: 40
- Goals scored: 159 (3.98 per game)

The 1938 Ice Hockey World Championships were held between February 11 and February 20, 1938, at Štvanice Stadium in Prague, Czechoslovakia. It marked the 30th anniversary of the IIHF, and a special celebration was held with famous hockey players from all over Europe in attendance. Also a yearbook was produced for the twenty-two member nations which documented which European country had the most hockey clubs (Czechoslovakia 361) and the most artificial rinks (Great Britain 21).

Fourteen teams participated in this World Championship. It was first divided into three preliminary round groups — two groups of five and a group with four teams. In the preliminary round, the top three teams in each group advanced to the second round. The nine teams advancing to the second round were divided into three groups of three teams each. The three group winners and the best second-place team advanced to the semifinals.

The Canadians won the World Championship title for the tenth time beating Great Britain 3-1 in the final, leaving the British with their fourth European Championship title (the third in a row). In the bronze-medal game, Czechoslovakia defeated Germany 3-0, and in a match for fifth place Sweden defeated Switzerland 2-0. The Swiss were very unhappy with the IIHF's decision to pick Germany as the fourth semi-finalist, as the two of them, and Sweden, finished the second round in an absolute tie. The decision was made to advance Germany because they had lost to Canada, so they were the best European nation in their group.

== World Men's Hockey Championships (in Prague, Czechoslovakia) ==
=== First round ===
==== Group A ====
11 February 1938	Zimní stadión Štvanice, Prague	Switzerland	–	Hungary	1:0 (0:0,1:0,0:0)
11 February 1938	Zimní stadión Štvanice, Prague	Lithuania	–	Romania	1:0 (0:0,0:0,1:0)
12 February 1938	Zimní stadión Štvanice, Prague	Switzerland	–	Romania	8:1 (2:0,1:1,5:0)
12 February 1938	Zimní stadión Štvanice, Prague	Poland	–	Lithuania	8:1 (4:0,3:0,1:1)
13 February 1938	Zimní stadión Štvanice, Prague	Poland	–	Romania	3:0 (1:0,2:0,0:0)
13 February 1938	Zimní stadión Štvanice, Prague	Hungary	–	Lithuania	10:1 (2:0,4:0,4:1)
14 February 1938	Zimní stadión Štvanice, Prague	Switzerland	–	Lithuania	15:0 (9:0,2:0,4:0)
14 February 1938	Zimní stadión Štvanice, Prague	Poland	–	Hungary	3:0 (1:0,1:0,1:0)
15 February 1938	Zimní stadión Štvanice, Prague	Hungary	–	Romania	3:1 (1:1,1:0,1:0)
15 February 1938	Zimní stadión Štvanice, Prague	Switzerland	–	Poland	7:1 (3:0,1:0,3:1)

Standings - Group A

Pos.	Team	GP	Wins	Ties	Losses	Goals	Diff.	Points
1	Switzerland	4	4	0	0	31: 2	+29	8:0
2	Poland	4	3	0	1	15: 8	+ 7	6:2
3	Hungary	4	2	0	2	13: 6	+ 7	4:4
4	Lithuania	4	1	0	3	3:33	-30	2:6
5	Romania	4	0	0	4	2:15	-13	0:8

==== Group B ====
11 February 1938	Zimní stadión Štvanice, Prague	Latvia	–	Norway	3:1 OT (1:0,0:1,0:0,2:0)
11 February 1938	Zimní stadión Štvanice, Prague	Great Britain	–	Germany	1:0 (0:0,1:0,0:0)
12 February 1938	Zimní stadión Štvanice, Prague	United States	–	Latvia	1:0 (0:0,1:0,0:0)
12 February 1938	Zimní stadión Štvanice, Prague	Great Britain	–	Norway	8:0 (2:0,1:0,5:0)
13 February 1938	Zimní stadión Štvanice, Prague	United States	–	Norway	7:1 (3:0,4:0,0:1)
13 February 1938	Zimní stadión Štvanice, Prague	Germany	–	Latvia	1:0 (0:0,1:0,0:0)
14 February 1938	Zimní stadión Štvanice, Prague	Great Britain	–	Latvia	5:1 (1:0,2:0,2:1)
14 February 1938	Zimní stadión Štvanice, Prague	United States	–	Germany	1:0 (1:0,0:0,0:0)
15 February 1938	Zimní stadión Štvanice, Prague	Germany	–	Norway	8:0 (2:0,1:0,5:0)
15 February 1938	Zimní stadión Štvanice, Prague	Great Britain	–	United States	1:1 OT (0:0,0:0,1:1,0:0,0:0,0:0)

Standings - Group B

Pos.	Team	GP	Wins	Ties	Losses	Goals	Diff.	Points
1	Great Britain	4	3	1	0	15: 2	+13	7:1
2	United States	4	3	1	0	10: 2	+ 8	7:1
3	Germany	4	2	0	2	9: 2	+ 7	4:4
4	Latvia	4	1	0	3	4: 8	4	2:6
5	Norway	4	0	0	4	2:26	-24	0:8

==== Group C ====
11 February 1938	Zimní stadión Štvanice, Prague	Canada	–	Sweden	3:2 (1:0,1:2,1:0)
11 February 1938	Zimní stadión Štvanice, Prague	Czechoslovakia	–	Austria	1:0 (0:0,0:0,1:0)
13 February 1938	Zimní stadión Štvanice, Prague	Canada	–	Austria	3:0 (1:0,1:0,1:0)
13 February 1938	Zimní stadión Štvanice, Prague	Czechoslovakia	–	Sweden	0:0 OT (0:0,0:0,0:0,0:0,0:0,0:0)
15 February 1938	Zimní stadión Štvanice, Prague	Czechoslovakia	–	Canada	0:3 (0:2,0:0,0:1)
15 February 1938	Zimní stadión Štvanice, Prague	Sweden	–	Austria	1:1 OT (0:1,1:0,0:0,0:0,0:0,0:0)

Standings - Group C

Pos.	Team	GP	Wins	Ties	Losses	Goals	Diff.	Points
1	Canada	3	3	0	0	9:2	+7	6:0
2	Czechoslovakia	3	1	1	1	1:3	-2	3:3
3	Sweden	3	0	2	1	3:4	-1	2:4
4	Austria	3	0	1	2	1:5	-4	1:5

=== Second round ===
==== Group A ====
16 February 1938	Zimní stadión Štvanice, Prague	Czechoslovakia	–	United States	2:0 (0:0,1:0,1:0)
17 February 1938	Zimní stadión Štvanice, Prague	Switzerland	–	United States	1:0 (0:0,0:0,1:0)
18 February 1938	Zimní stadión Štvanice, Prague	Czechoslovakia	–	Switzerland	3:2 OT. (0:1,1:0,0:0,2:1)

Standings - Group A

Pos.	Team	GP	Wins	Ties	Losses	Goals	Diff.	Points
1	Czechoslovakia	2	2	0	0	5:2	+3	4:0
2	Switzerland +	2	1	0	1	3:3	0	2:2
3	United States	2	0	0	2	0:3	-3	0:4

==== Group B ====
16 February 1938	Zimní stadión Štvanice, Prague	Great Britain	–	Sweden	3:2 (0:0,1:1,2:1)
17 February 1938	Zimní stadión Štvanice, Prague	Sweden	–	Poland	1:0 (0:0,0:0,1:0)
18 February 1938	Zimní stadión Štvanice, Prague	Great Britain	–	Poland	7:1 (3:1,4:0,0:0)

Standings - Group B

Pos.	Team	GP	Wins	Ties	Losses	Goals	Diff.	Points
1	Great Britain	2	2	0	0	10: 3	+7	4:0
2	Sweden +	2	1	0	1	3: 3	0	2:2
3	Poland	2	0	0	2	1: 8	-7	0:4

==== Group C ====
16 February 1938	Zimní stadión Štvanice, Prague	Canada	–	Germany	3:2 OT. (1:1,0:1,1:0,1:0)
17 February 1938	Zimní stadión Štvanice, Prague	Germany	–	Hungary	1:0 (0:0,1:0,0:0)
18 February 1938	Zimní stadión Štvanice, Prague	Canada	–	Hungary	1:1 OT. (1:1,0:0,0:0,0:0,0:0,0:0)

Standings—Group C

Pos.	Team	GP	Wins	Ties	Losses	Goals	Diff.	Points
1	Canada	2	1	1	0	4:3	+1	3:1
2	Germany +	2	1	0	1	3:3	0	2:2
3	Hungary	2	0	1	1	1:2	-1	1:3

+ Germany, Switzerland and Sweden ended with identical records. The Organizing Committee awarded the semifinal position to Germany because it had to play Canada.

=== Consolation round 5–6 place ===
19 February 1938	Zimní stadión Štvanice, Prague	Sweden	–	Switzerland	2:0 (1:0,0:0,1:0)

=== Final round ===
Semifinals
19 February 1938	Zimní stadión Štvanice, Prague	Canada	–	Germany	1:0 (0:0,0:0,1:0)
19 February 1938	Zimní stadión Štvanice, Prague	Czechoslovakia	–	Great Britain	0:1 (0:0,0:0,0:1)
Game for 3rd place
20 February 1938	Zimní stadión Štvanice, Prague	Czechoslovakia	–	Germany	3:0 (1:0,2:0,0:0)
Final
20 February 1938	Zimní stadión Štvanice, Prague	Canada	–	Great Britain	3:1 (3:1,0:0,0:0)

=== Final Rankings – World Championships ===
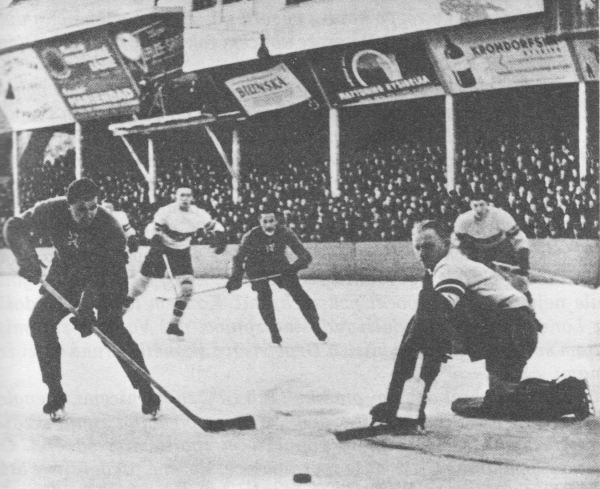
The bronze-medal match between Czechoslovakia and Germany. Czechoslovakia won 3–0.

Gold medal	Canada
Silver medal	Great Britain
Bronze medal	Czechoslovakia
4	Germany
5	Sweden
6	Switzerland
7	Hungary
7	Poland
7	United States
10	Austria
10	Latvia
10	Lithuania
13	Norway
13	Romania

World Champion 1938
Canada

==== Members of team ====
Sudbury Wolves

Pos.	Team	Players
1	CAN	Pat McReavy, Roy Heximer, Mel Albright, Johnny Godfrey, Glen Sutherland, Gordie Bruce, Jimmy Russell, Buster Portland, Jack Marshall, John Coulter, Percy Allen, Reg Chipman, Archie Burnie; Trainer: Max Silverman

=== Final Rankings – European Championships ===
Gold medal	Great Britain
Silver medal	Czechoslovakia
Bronze medal	Germany
4	Sweden
5	Switzerland
6	Hungary
6	Poland
8	Austria
8	Latvia
8	Lithuania
11	Norway
11	Romania

European Champion 1938
Great Britain
