= Vladimír Kolář =

Czech speed skater

Personal information
- Nationality: Czech
- Born: 2 July 1927
- Died: 25 October 2012 (aged 85)

Sport
- Sport: Speed skating

Vladimír Kolář (2 July 1927 – 25 October 2012) was a Czech speed skater. He competed at the 1948 Winter Olympics and the 1956 Winter Olympics.
