= Vladimír Zábrodský =

Czechoslovak ice hockey and tennis player (1923–2020)

- Born: 7 March 1923 Prague, Czechoslovakia
- Died: 20 March 2020 (aged 97) Stockholm, Sweden
- Height: 6 ft 0 in (183 cm)
- Weight: 185 lb (84 kg; 13 st 3 lb)
- Position: Centre
- Shot: Left
- Played for: LTC Prague; Spartak ČKD Sokolovo; Bohemians ČKD Praha
- Playing career: 1939–1965
Medal record
Representing Czechoslovakia
Men's ice hockey
Olympic Games
Silver medal – second place	1948 St. Moritz	Men's
World Championships
Gold medal – first place	1947 Prague	Men's
Gold medal – first place	1949 Stockholm	Men's

Vladimír Olegovic Zábrodský (7 March 1923 – 20 March 2020) was a Czechoslovak ice hockey and tennis player. Born in Prague, Czechoslovakia, he won a silver medal with the Czechoslovakia national team at the 1948 Winter Olympics, and won the world championships (1947 and 1949). Zábrodský was also a tennis player and member of the Czechoslovak Davis Cup team. He was inducted into the International Ice Hockey Federation Hall of Fame in 1997.

== Ice hockey career ==
He was one of the inaugural members of the International Ice Hockey Federation Hall of Fame, inducted in 1997. He played in the Czechoslovak First Ice Hockey League for LTC Prague from 1940 to 1950, Spartak ČKD Sokolovo from 1950 to 1960, and Bohemians ČKD Praha from 1963 to 1965, collecting 306 goals.

== Tennis career ==
Zábrodský also represented Czechoslovakia in the Davis Cup during 1948, 1955, and 1956. He made his Davis Cup debut for Czechoslovakia in the 1948 Europe Zone second-round tie against Brazil. He played the doubles rubber with Jaroslav Drobný, beating the Brazilian pair of Manoel Fernandes and Ernesto Petersen in straight sets. He also participated in the 1948 Europe Zone Final, where he played in the dead singles rubber against Torsten Johansson, losing in four sets. Zábrodský's last Davis Cup appearance was in the losing second-round tie against Denmark in the 1956 Europe Zone draw. Zábrodský played in five singles Davis Cup rubbers, two of which he won, and also in five doubles rubbers, with three wins.

== Personal and later life ==
Zábrodský was born in Prague. His mother was Russian, and his brother Oldřich was also a hockey player.

In 1965 Zábrodský defected to Sweden, where he would spend the rest of his life. Zábrodský and his wife used fake passports and traveled through Hungary and Yugoslavia before reaching Switzerland, where Oldřich, who was playing for Lausanne HC, met them. He took up coaching ice hockey, and worked for Leksands IF, Djurgårdens IF, and Rögle BK. Later on Zábrodský returned to tennis, serving as a coach. He died on 20 March 2020 in Stockholm at the age of 97.
