= František Balvín =

Czech cross-country skier

František Balvín (7 January 1915 – 20 October 22003) was a Czech cross-country skier who competed for Czechoslovakia in the late 1930s, 1940s and early 1950s. Competing in two Winter Olympics, he finished 11th in the 50 km event in 1948 and 21st in the 50 km event in 1952. He was born in Nové Město na Moravě, Moravia, Austria-Hungary.
