= Bohumil Kosour =

Czech soldier and skier (1913–1997)

Personal information
- Born: 5 March 1913 Radňovice, Moravia, Austria-Hungary
- Died: 24 April 1997 (aged 84) Vsetín, Czech Republic

Sport
- Sport: Skiing
Medal record
Representing Czechoslovakia

Bohumil Kosour (5 March 1913 – 24 April 1997) was a Czech soldier and skier.

Kosour was born in Radňovice. He was a member of the national Olympic military patrol team in 1936 which placed eighth. He also took part at the 18 km cross-country ski and the Nordic combined event of the 1948 Winter Olympics. In a row from 1939 to 1942 and in 1949 he placed first at the Zlatá lyže ('Golden Ski') cross-country ski race in his hometown, which was primarily carried out for the first time in 1934.
