= Max Ippen =

Czechoslovak bobsledder

Max Ippen (16 May 1906 in Vienna – 28 May 1957 in Paris) was a Czechoslovak bobsledder who competed in the late 1940s. At the 1948 Winter Olympics in St. Moritz, he finished 14th in both the two-man and four-man events. During World War II, Ippen concealed his Jewish ethnicity by posing as a Catholic, but he did not manage to avoid arrest for the duration of the war. He, along with over eighty members of his extended family, was arrested and interred by the Nazis. Ippen was sent first to the Auschwitz concentration camp and then transferred to Dachau. Though Ippen survived, most of his family did not.
