= Václav Roziňák =

Czechoslovak ice hockey player

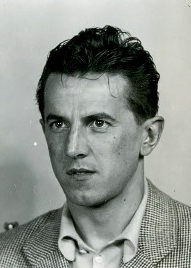
- Born: December 7, 1922 Prague, Czechoslovakia
- Died: March 1, 1997 (aged 74) Zürich, Switzerland
- Position: Right wing
- Played for: SK Podoli Praha; LTC Praha; TJ Rudá Hvězda Brno; TJ Spartak Praha Sokolovo
- Coached for: TJ Spartak Praha Sokolovo; Grasshopper Club Zürich; Rapperswil-Jona; EHC Bassersdorf
- National team: Czechoslovakia
- Playing career: 1940–1964
- Coaching career: 1964–1973
Medal record
Olympic Games
Silver medal – second place	1948 St. Moritz	Team
World Championships
Gold medal – first place	1947 Prague	Team
Gold medal – first place	1949 Stockholm	Team

Václav Roziňák (December 7, 1922 in Prague, Czechoslovakia – March 1, 1997 in Zürich, Switzerland) was an ice hockey player for the Czechoslovak national team. He won a silver medal at the 1948 Winter Olympics.

In 1950 he was imprisoned with other Czech hockey players by the communist government. His career and the careers of his colleagues were ended by the communist regime. After being released from the prison, he emigrated in 1968 to Switzerland.

== See also ==
- 1950 Imprisonment of Czechoslovak Ice Hockey Players
