= Alexandra Nekvapilová =

Czech alpine skier (1919–2014)

Alexandra Nekvapilová, also known as Sasha Nekvapil (5 October 1919 – 10 June 2014), was a Czech alpine skier who competed in the 1948 Winter Olympics. Along with her husband Karel and brother, fellow Olympic skier Frank Prihoda, she defected from Czechoslovakia in 1948 and emigrated to Australia. There they started one of the first ski-lodge businesses in Thredbo, New South Wales.
