= Oldřich Zábrodský =

- Born: February 28, 1926 Prague, Czechoslovakia
- Died: September 22, 2015 (aged 89) Belgium
- Position: Defence
- Played for: LTC Prague; HC Davos; HC Lausanne
- Playing career: 1944–1951
Medal record
Representing Czechoslovakia
Men's ice hockey
Olympic Games
Silver medal – second place	1948 St. Moritz	Men's

Oldřich Zábrodský (February 28, 1926 – September 22, 2015) was a Czech ice hockey player for the Czechoslovak national team. He won a silver medal at the 1948 Winter Olympics.

== Early life ==
Zábrodský was born in Prague, Czechoslovakia. His mother was Russian and his brother, Vladimír, was also a hockey player.

== Career ==
Zábrodský played for LTC Praha. After the Spengler Cup in late-1948, he remained in Switzerland, where he finished the season playing for HC Davos. During the next two seasons, Zábrodský played for HC Lausanne before ending his professional career.

== Personal life ==
In 1951, he emigrated to the United States through Italy. In 1960, he moved to Belgium, where he lived until he died in 2015.
