= Jaroslav Cardal =

Czechoslovak cross-country skier

Jaroslav Cardal (16 March 1919 in Mrklov – 6 May 2010 in Jilemnice) was a Czech cross-country skier who competed for Czechoslovakia in the late 1940s and early 1950s. Competing in three Winter Olympics, he finished eighth in the 50 km event in 1948 and 14th in the 50 km event in 1952.
