= Bohumil Modrý =

Czechoslovak ice hockey player

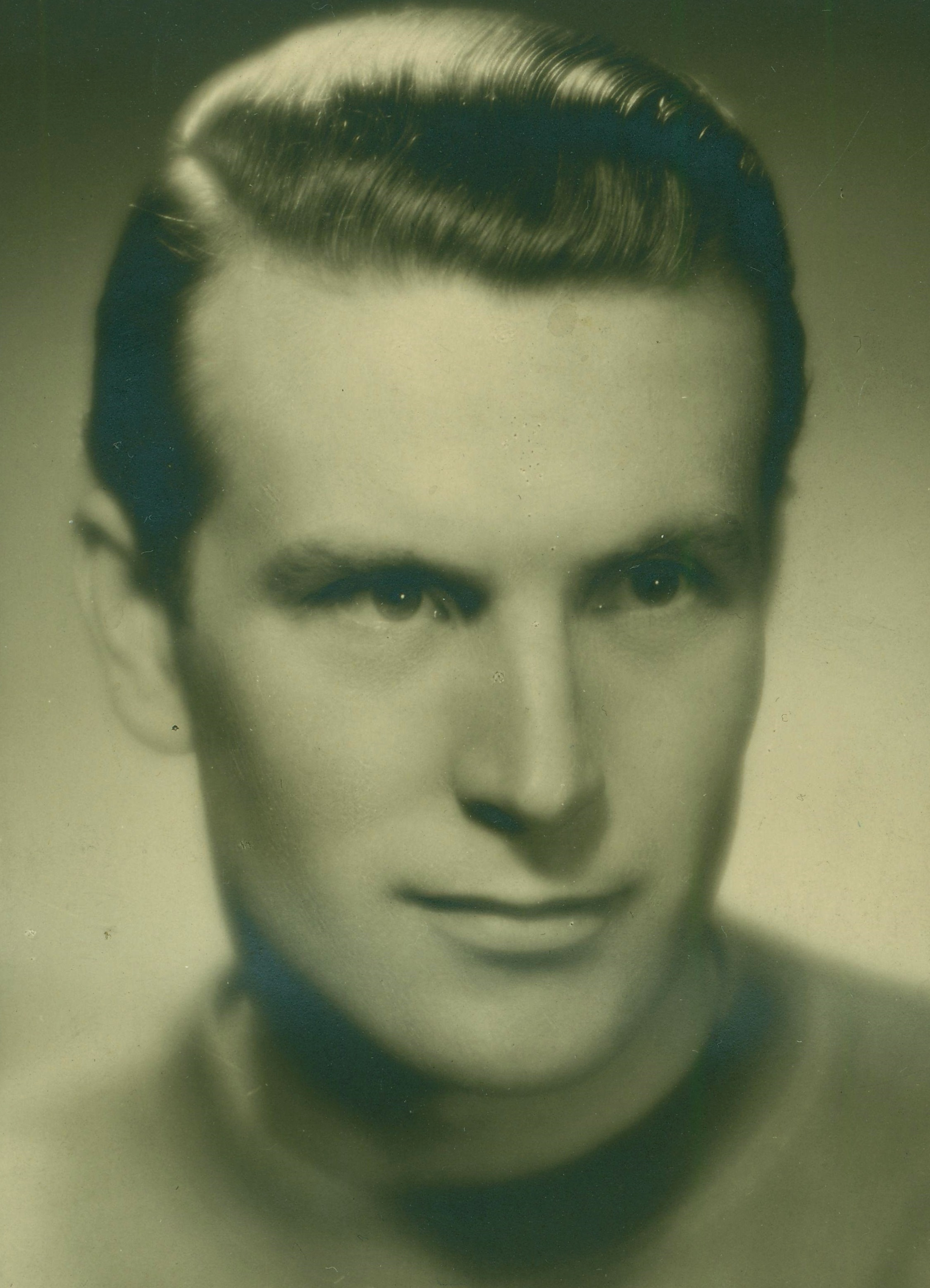

Personal information
- Born: 24 September 1916 Prague, Austria-Hungary
- Died: 21 July 1963 (aged 46) Prague, Czechoslovakia
Medal record
Men's ice hockey
Olympic Games
Silver medal – second place	1948 St. Moritz	Ice hockey
World Championship
Gold medal – first place	1947 Prague	Ice hockey
Gold medal – first place	1949 Stockholm	Ice hockey

Bohumil Modrý (24 September 1916 – 21 July 1963) was a goaltender for the Czechoslovakia men's national ice hockey team which won the silver medal at the 1948 Olympics and 2 gold medals - at the 1947 World Championship and at the 1949 World Championship. He was posthumously inducted into the IIHF Hall of Fame in 2011.

== Career ==
Modrý played his club hockey with LTC Praha (LTC Prague), which suffered four defections at the 1948 Spengler Cup in Davos. He was still a player with LTC Praha, and travelling as a delegate with the 1950 Czechoslovakia national team in March, when he and his teammates were arrested by the communist authorities. The Czech national team were stopped on Saturday 11 March at Prague Airport while preparing to travel to London to defend their title at the 1950 World Championship tournament (reason: reporter's visas, but it was lie). On Monday 13 March they were arrested after the party on 12 March. Party was provide in the "Gold Pub", U Herclíků, Pštrossova 192/24, 110 00 Praha 1 – Nové Město and personally Modrý was not there. They were frustrated and in the pub they hates communist party (but secret police - STB - was there also). Some of them were charged with making plans to defect to the West. In October 1950 Modrý and ten other players were convicted of treason. Modrý received the longest sentence, 15 years in prison, as the supposed leader of the potential defection plan (together - 11 people ~ 74 years and 8 months).

Modrý served his prison time in Pankrác Prison in Prague and Bory Prison in Plzeň. He also served some of his time as a forced laborer in the uranium mines in Jáchymov. Modrý served 5 years of the 15 year sentence, dying in his hometown of Prague 8 years after his release (1955) from incarceration.

He was posthumously inducted into the IIHF Hall of Fame in 2011.

== See also ==
- 1950 Imprisonment of Czechoslovak Ice Hockey Players
