= Eduard Novotný =

Czechoslovak bobsledder

Eduard Novotný (born 2 April 1921) was a Czechoslovak bobsledder who competed in the late 1940s. At the 1948 Winter Olympics in St. Moritz, he finished 14th in both the two-man and four-man events.
