= Miroslav Sláma =

Czech ice hockey player (1917–2008)

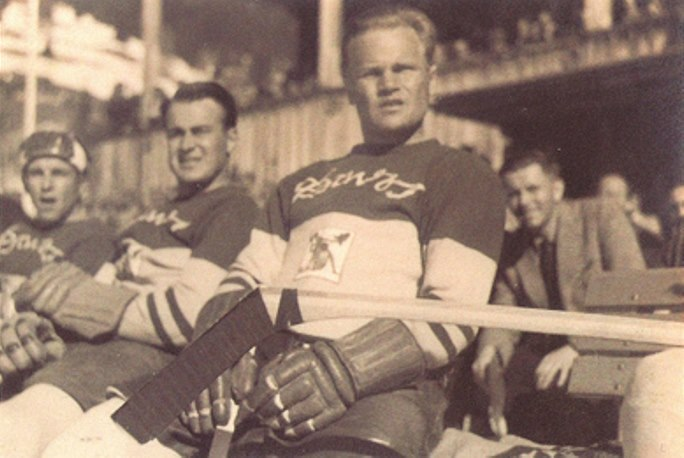
- Born: 3 August 1917 Třebíč, Bohemia, Austria-Hungary
- Died: 30 November 2008 (aged 91) Thousand Oaks, California, United States
- Position: Defence
- National team: Czechoslovakia
Medal record
Representing Czechoslovakia
Men's Ice Hockey
Silver medal – second place	1948 St. Moritz	Team

Miroslav "Michael" Sláma (3 August 1917 – 30 November 2008) was a Czech ice hockey player and later an American librarian. He represented Czechoslovakia and won a silver medal at the 1948 Winter Olympics and a gold medal at the 1947 Ice Hockey World Championships. In total, he played 26 games and scored 9 goals for the Czechoslovakia national ice hockey team.

== Biography ==
Toward the end of World War II, Sláma went to Theresienstadt concentration camp to help people from Třebíč return home. After the communist coup d'état in Czechoslovakia he defected to Switzerland in December 1948 during an ice hockey tournament in Davos, and spent five years as a player and coach there before emigrating to the United States where he became a librarian and library administrator.

After his death on 30 November 2008 in Thousand Oaks, California, his remains were transferred to the Old Cemetery in Třebíč, Czech Republic.
