= Gordie Bruce =

Canadian ice hockey player (1919–1997)

- Born: May 9, 1919 Ottawa, Ontario, Canada
- Died: July 15, 1997 (aged 78) Ottawa, Ontario, Canada
- Height: 5 ft 10 in (178 cm)
- Weight: 165 lb (75 kg; 11 st 11 lb)
- Position: Left wing
- Shot: Left
- Played for: Boston Bruins
- Playing career: 1937–1951

Gordie Bruce
Medal record

Men's ice hockey

Representing Canada

World Championships
Gold medal – first place	1938 Czechoslovakia	

Arthur Gordon Bruce (May 9, 1919 – July 15, 1997) was a Canadian professional ice hockey forward who played 28 games in the National Hockey League for the Boston Bruins. He was born in Ottawa, Ontario.

During the 1940-41 season Boston Bruce was called up from the minors to play 7 regular season games. He was with the team during the playoffs, but did not play, so the Boston Bruins did not include his name on the Stanley Cup.

As a member of the Sudbury Wolves he helped Canada win the 1938 World Championships in Prague, Czechoslovakia by scoring 3 goals and 2 assist in 7 games.

== Career statistics ==
=== Regular season and playoffs ===
			Regular season					Playoffs
Season	Team	League	GP	G	A	Pts	PIM	GP	G	A	Pts	PIM
1936–37	Glebe College	HS-ON	—	—	—	—	—	—	—	—	—	—
1937–38	Sudbury Frood Tigers	NBHL	1	0	0	0	4	—	—	—	—	—
1937–38	Sudbury Wolves	M-Cup	—	—	—	—	—	4	8	1	9	6
1938–39	North Bay Trappers	NOHA	45	23	44	67	—	—	—	—	—	—
1938–39	North Bay Trappers	M-Cup	—	—	—	—	—	2	4	3	7	6
1939–40	Hershey Bears	IAHL	50	10	20	30	13	5	2	3	5	6
1940–41	Boston Bruins	NHL	8	0	1	1	2	2	0	0	0	0
1940–41	Hershey Bears	AHL	46	23	19	42	39	10	4	5	9	6
1941–42	Boston Bruins	NHL	15	4	8	12	11	5	2	3	5	4
1941–42	Hershey Bears	AHL	38	19	13	32	34	—	—	—	—	—
1942–43	Montreal Army	QSHL	13	14	5	19	6	—	—	—	—	—
1942–43	Ottawa Commandos	QSHL	—	—	—	—	—	8	1	1	2	2
1942–43	Ottawa Commandos	Al-Cup	—	—	—	—	—	2	0	0	0	0
1943–44	Ottawa Commandos	QSHL	8	3	3	6	10	—	—	—	—	—
1945–46	Boston Bruins	NHL	5	0	0	0	0	—	—	—	—	—
1946–47	Hershey Bears	AHL	57	35	28	63	44	10	6	9	15	0
1947–48	Hershey Bears	AHL	67	27	25	52	32	2	1	0	1	0
1948–49	Hershey Bears	AHL	62	22	23	45	34	11	7	9	16	2
1949–50	Hershey Bears	AHL	58	16	21	37	31	—	—	—	—	—
1950–51	Glace Bay Miners	CBMHL	59	7	10	17	52	10	7	2	9	16
IAHL/AHL totals			378	152	149	301	227	38	20	26	46	14
NHL totals			28	4	9	13	13	7	2	3	5	4

=== International ===
Year	Team	Event	GP	G	A	Pts	PIM
1938	Canada	WC	7	2	3	5	—
Senior totals			7	2	3	5	—
