= Ladislav Troják =

Czechoslovak ice hockey player

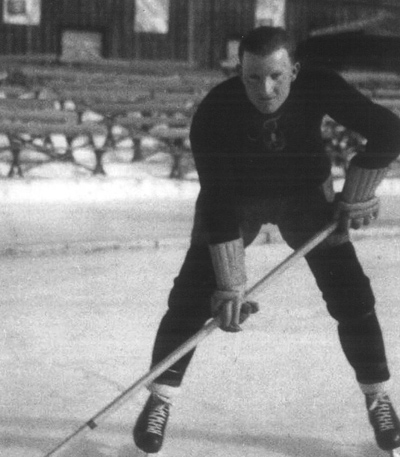
- Ladislav Troják
- Born: 15 June 1914 Kassa, Kingdom of Hungary, Austria-Hungary
- Died: 8 November 1948 (aged 34) La Manche
- Height: 5 ft 11 in (180 cm)
- Weight: 185 lb (84 kg; 13 st 3 lb)
- Position: Right wing
- Shot: Right
- Played for: LTC Praha
- National team: Czechoslovakia
- Playing career: 1933–1948

Ladislav Troják (15 June 1914 – 8 November 1948) was a Slovak ice hockey player. On the national team of Czechoslovakia, he was the first Slovak hockey player to win a World Championship (1947 World Championship). Troják wore the number 9.

He died on 8 November 1948 during an aircraft accident over the English Channel, along with five other members of the Czechoslovak national team. He was posthumously inducted into the IIHF Hall of Fame in 2011.

== Playing career ==
He was a player in the ice hockey teams of ČsŠK Košice (until 1934) and LTC Prague (1934–1948). He scored 37 times in 75 games for the national team of Czechoslovakia. Ladislav Troják has been a member of the Slovak Hockey Hall of Fame since 30 November 2002, and the Czech Hockey Hall of Fame since 2008. He was posthumously inducted into the IIHF Hall of Fame in 2011.

The new home arena of the ice hockey team of HC Košice – The Steel Aréna – Košice's Ladislav Troják Stadium (open on 24 February 2006) is named in honour of Ladislav Troják. His daughter Jana Alexander-Trojak has lived in the United States since 1969. She lives in Prescott, Arizona and she is a fan of the NHL Arizona Coyotes.
