= Daniel Šlachta =

Slovak skier (1923–2007)

Personal information
- Nationality: Slovak
- Born: 13 February 1923; Žilina, Czechoslovakia
- Died: 16 April 2007 (aged 84); Žilina, Slovakia

Sport
- Sport: Alpine skiing

Daniel Šlachta (13 February 1923 – 16 April 2007) was a Slovak alpine skier. He competed in three events at the 1948 Winter Olympics.
