= Přemysl Hainý =

Czech ice hockey player (1925–1993)

- Born: 18 December 1925 Prague, Czechoslovakia
- Died: 24 October 1993 (aged 67)
- Position: Defenceman
- National team: Czechoslovakia
- Playing career: 1943–1962
Medal record
Men's Ice Hockey
Silver medal – second place	1948 St. Moritz	Team

Přemysl Hainý (18 December 1925 – 24 October 1993) was a Czech ice hockey player. He won a silver medal at the 1948 Winter Olympics with the Czechoslovakia national team.

== Life and career ==
Přemysl Hainý was born on 18 December 1925 in Prague.

Hainý began his club career with LTC Praha after World War II before switching to ATK Praha in 1948. He and his eleven other members of the Czechoslovak national team were stopped from competing in the 1950 World Championships by the government. After they complained, the government arrested them and charged them with trying to defect. He never again represented Czechoslovakia internationally.

He returned to ice hockey in 1951, playing with TJ Poldi SONP Kladno for one season and then joining Tatra Smichov in 1955. He played his final five seasons with TJ Poldi SONP. He died on 24 October 1993.
