= Vladimír Kobranov =

Czech ice hockey player (1927–2015)

Personal information
- Born: 4 October 1927 Černošice, Czechoslovakia
- Died: 25 October 2015 (aged 88) Switzerland
Medal record
Men's Ice Hockey
Silver medal – second place	1948 St. Moritz	Team

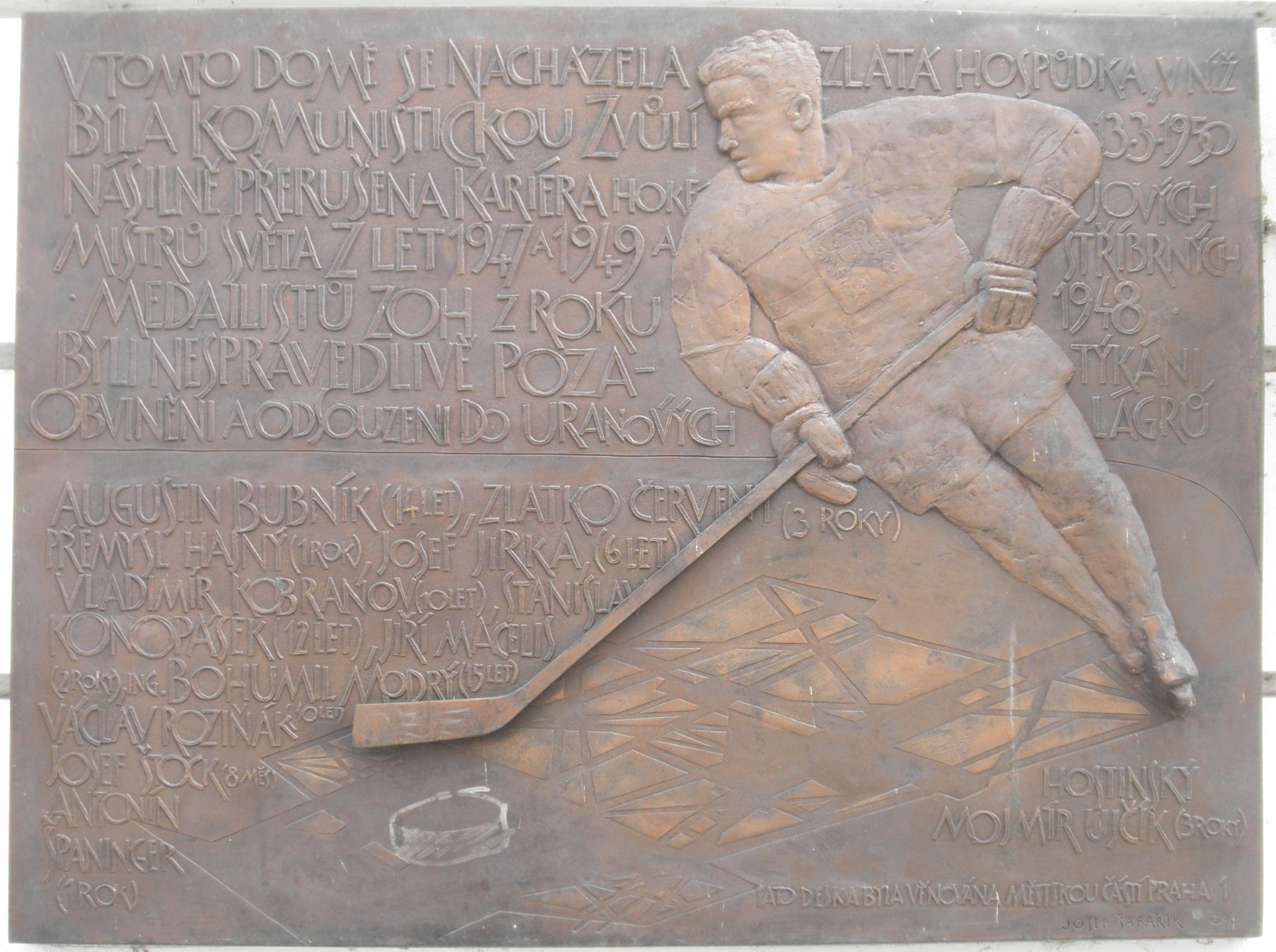
Plaque honoring hockey players. Kobranov is named above the stick.

Vladimír Kobranov (4 October 1927 – 25 October 2015) was a Czech ice hockey player who represented Czechoslovakia.

He won a silver medal at the 1948 Winter Olympics and a gold medal at the 1949 world championship. In 1950 he was imprisoned with other Czech hockey players by the communist government after being accused of planning to defect. His career and careers of his colleagues were ended by the communist regime. In 2009 he was introduced in the Czech Ice Hockey Hall of Fame.
