= Jaroslav Zajíček =

Czech cross-country skier

Personal information
- Nationality: Czech
- Born: 31 May 1920; Radňovice, Czechoslovakia
- Died: 5 November 2002 (aged 82)

Sport
- Sport: Cross-country skiing

Jaroslav Zajíček (31 May 1920 – 5 November 2002) was a Czech cross-country skier. He competed in the men's 18 kilometre event at the 1948 Winter Olympics.
