= Vít Fousek Sr. =

Czech cross-country skier

Personal information
- Nationality: Czech
- Born: 31 December 1913; Nové Město na Moravě, Czechoslovakia
- Died: 1990 (aged 76–77)

Sport
- Sport: Cross-country skiing

Vít Fousek Sr. (31 December 1913 – 1990) was a Czech cross-country skier. He competed in the men's 18 kilometre event at the 1948 Winter Olympics.
