= Vilibald Šťovík =

Czech ice hockey player

Personal information
- Born: 9 October 1917 Prague, Bohemia, Austria-Hungary
- Died: 8 November 1948 (aged 31) La Manche
Medal record
Men's Ice Hockey
Silver medal – second place	1948 St. Moritz	Team

Vilibald Šťovík (9 October 1917 – 8 November 1948) was a Czech ice hockey player who played for the Czechoslovakia national team. He won a silver medal at the 1948 Winter Olympics.

He died when in the airplane disaster, when the airplane with Czechoslovakia national ice hockey team fell down to the English Channel on the flight from Paris to London.
