= Karel Stibor =

Czech ice hockey player

Personal information
- Born: 5 November 1923 Prague, Czechoslovakia
- Died: 8 November 1948 (aged 25) La Manche
Medal record
Men's Ice Hockey
Silver medal – second place	1948 St. Moritz	Team

Karel Stibor (5 November 1923 – 8 November 1948) was a Czech ice hockey player for the Czechoslovak national team. He won a silver medal at the 1948 Winter Olympics.

He died in an air crash, when the airplane carrying the Czechoslovak ice hockey national team fell into the English Channel on a flight from Paris to London.
