= Miloslav Pokorný =

Czechoslovak ice hockey player

Personal information
- Born: 5 October 1926 Prague, Czechoslovakia
- Died: 8 November 1948 (aged 22) La Manche
Medal record
Men's Ice Hockey
Silver medal – second place	1948 St. Moritz	Team

Miloslav Pokorný (5 October 1926 in Prague, Czechoslovakia – 8 November 1948 in La Manche) was an ice hockey player for the Czechoslovak national team. He won a silver medal at the 1948 Winter Olympics.

He died in a airplane disaster, when the airplane with the Czechoslovakia ice hockey national team fell into the English Channel on the flight from Paris to London.
