= Stanislav Konopásek =

- Born: April 18, 1923 Hořovice, Czechoslovakia
- Died: March 6, 2008 (aged 84) Prague, Czech Republic
- Position: Left wing
- Shot: Left
- Played for: LTC Praha (1935–1950); Tatra Smíchov (1955–1956); Sparta Praha (1956–1962); Motorlet Praha (1962–1963)
- Playing career: 1935–1963

Stanislav Konopásek (April 18, 1923 – March 6, 2008) was a Czech professional ice hockey player.

== Playing career ==
Konopásek played as a winger when he was drafted for LTC Praha in 1935, whom he would play with until 1950. He also played on the national team, winning the 1947 and 1949 World Championships and a silver medal at the 1948 Winter Olympics in St. Moritz, Switzerland. Konopásek himself scored the winning goal that denied Canada the 1949 Championships.

In the 1948 Olympics, Konopásek also scored the winning goal in a 3–2 win over the United States, tying Canada's record of 7–0–1. They eventually lost to Canada by a single goal.

In 1950, as they were about to get on an airplane to defend their World Championship title in London, he and several of his teammates were charged with trying to leave Czechoslovakia and assaulting state police. Konopásek was sentenced to 12 years in prison for "slandering the republic", later reduced to 5. Other teammates received sentences ranging from six months to 15 years.

After getting out of prison, he then played for Tatra Smíchov (1955–1956), Sparta Praha (1956–1962), and Motorlet Praha (1962–1963), closing his international career with 69 goals in 50 games.

== Coaching career ==
After finishing his playing career in ice hockey he coached Motorlet Praha (1963–1965), GKS Katowice (1965–1968), and Sparta Praha (1968–1973). GKS Katowice, a Polish team, won a national championship in 1968 while coached by Konopásek.

== Death ==
Stanislav Konopásek died in Prague on March 6, 2008, following a long illness. He was survived by his wife, Anna, and a son.

== See also ==
- 1950 Imprisonment of Czechoslovak Ice Hockey Players
