= Zdeněk Jarkovský =

Czechoslovak ice hockey player (1918–1948)

Personal information
- Born: 3 October 1918 Nový Bydžov, Austria-Hungary
- Died: 8 November 1948 (aged 30) La Manche
Medal record
Men's Ice Hockey
Silver medal – second place	1948 St. Moritz	Team

Zdeněk Jarkovský (3 October 1918 in Nový Bydžov, Austria-Hungary – 8 November 1948 in La Manche) was an ice hockey goaltender for the Czechoslovak national team. He won a silver medal at the 1948 Winter Olympics.

He died when in an airplane disaster when the airplane with Czechoslovakia ice hockey national team fell into the English Channel on the flight from Paris to London.
