= Josef Trousílek =

Czechoslovak ice hockey player

Personal information
- Born: March 16, 1918 Prague, Austria-Hungary
- Died: October 10, 1990 (aged 72) Prague, Czechoslovakia
Medal record
Men's Ice Hockey
| Silver medal – second place | 1948 St. Moritz | Team |

Josef Trousílek (16 March 1918 – 10 October 1990) was an ice hockey player for the Czechoslovak national team. He won a silver medal at the 1948 Winter Olympics.
