= List of Olympic venues in speed skating =

For the Winter Olympics there are 22 venues that have been or will be used for speed skating. The first venues were outdoors on natural ice with the last one being held at 1956. Calgary's 1988 venue was the first to be constructed for indoor use. The last venue held outdoors was at the 1992 Winter Olympics in Albertville. Since the 1994 Games, all of the long track speed skating venues have been indoors.

Games	Venue	Other sports hosted at venue for those games	Capacity	Ref.
1924 Chamonix	Stade Olympique de Chamonix	Cross-country skiing, curling, figure skating, ice hockey, military patrol, Nordic combined (cross-country skiing)	45,000	
1928 St. Moritz	St. Moritz Olympic Ice Rink	Figure skating, ice hockey	4,000	
1932 Lake Placid	Olympic Stadium	Ice hockey	7,475	
1936 Garmisch- Partenkirchen	Riessersee	Bobsleigh, ice hockey	16,000 (17,940 bobsleigh)	
1948 St. Moritz	Olympic Stadium	Figure skating, ice hockey (final)	Not listed.	
1952 Oslo	Bislett Stadion	Bandy (demonstration), figure skating, opening ceremonies	29,000	
1956 Cortina d'Ampezzo	La pista di Misurina	None	8,550	
1960 Squaw Valley	Squaw Valley Olympic Skating Rink	Ice hockey	Not listed.	
1964 Innsbruck	Eisschnellaufbahn	None	Not listed.	
1968 Grenoble	L'Anneau de Vitesse	None	2,500	
1972 Sapporo	Makomanai Speed Skating Rink	Opening ceremonies	50,000	
1976 Innsbruck	Eisschnellaufbahn	None	7,000	
1980 Lake Placid	James B. Sheffield Speed Skating Oval	None	Not listed.	
1984 Sarajevo	Zetra Ice Rink	None	Not listed.	
1988 Calgary	Olympic Oval	None	4,000	
1992 Albertville	L'anneau de vitesse	None	10,000	
1994 Lillehammer	Hamar Olympic Hall	None	10,600	
1998 Nagano	M-Wave	None	10,000	
2002 Salt Lake City	Utah Olympic Oval	None	5,236	
2006 Turin	Oval Lingotto	None	8,250	
2010 Vancouver	Richmond Olympic Oval	None	8,000	
2014 Sochi	Adler Arena Skating Center	None	8,000	
2018 PyeongChang	Gangneung Oval	None	8,000	
2022 Beijing	Beijing National Speed Skating Oval	None	12,000	
2026 Milan-Cortina	Milan Ice Park	None	6,500	
2030 Alps	Thialf, Netherlands	None	12,500	
2034 Utah	Utah Olympic Oval	None	7,500	

== Gallery of venues ==
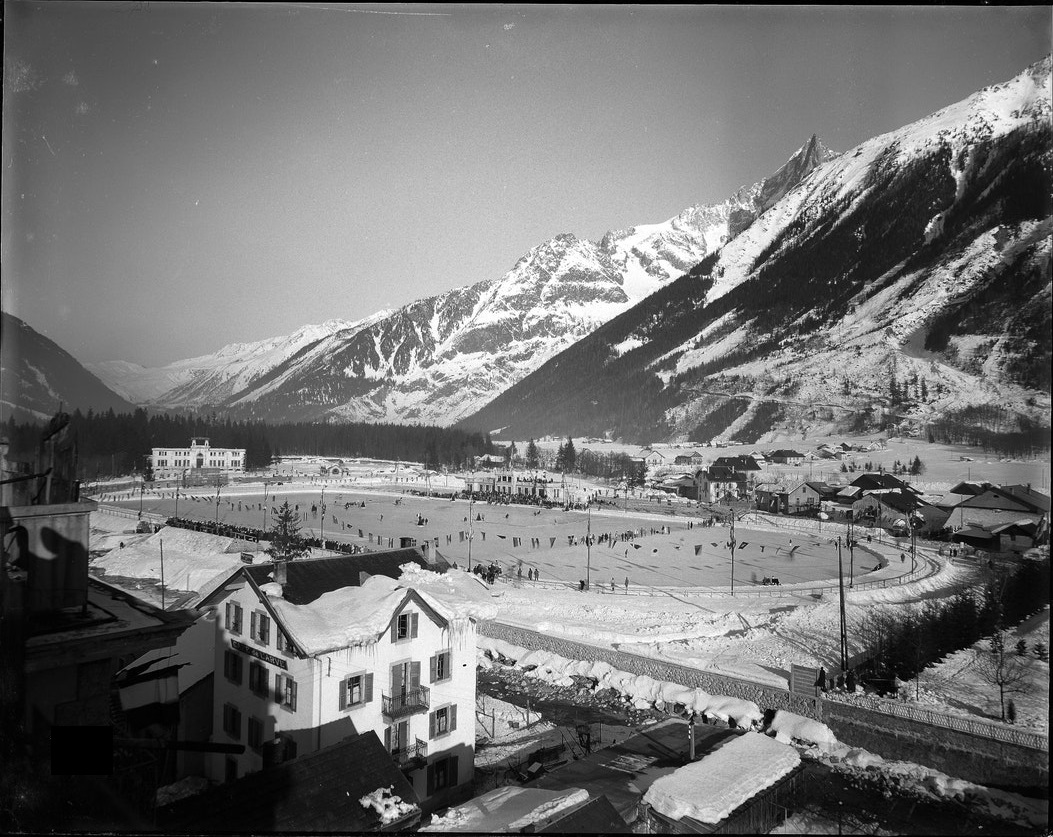
Stade Olympique de Chamonix hosted speed skating at the 1924 Winter Olympics.

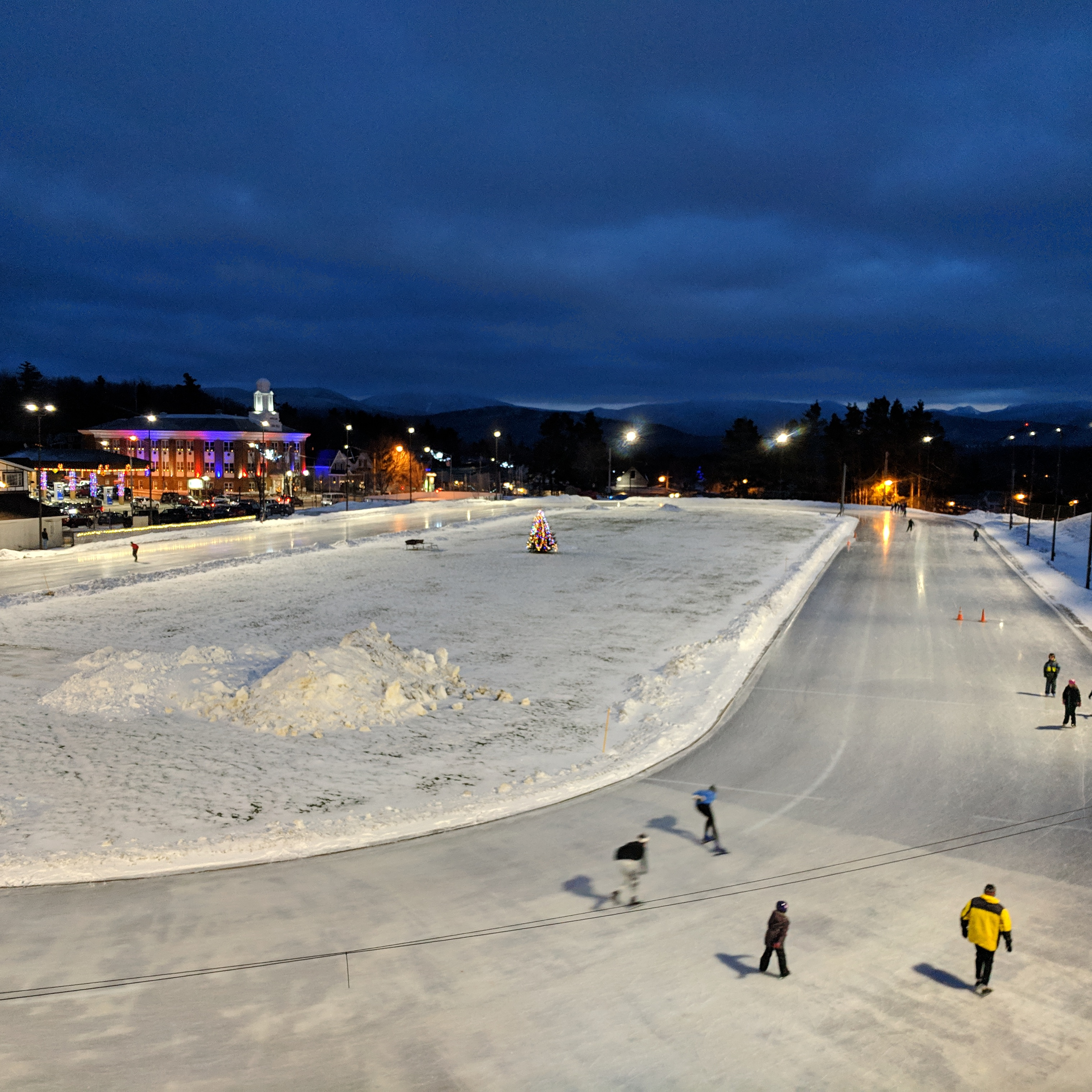
The James B. Sheffield Olympic Skating Rink hosted speed skating at the 1932 and 1980 Winter Olympics in Lake Placid.

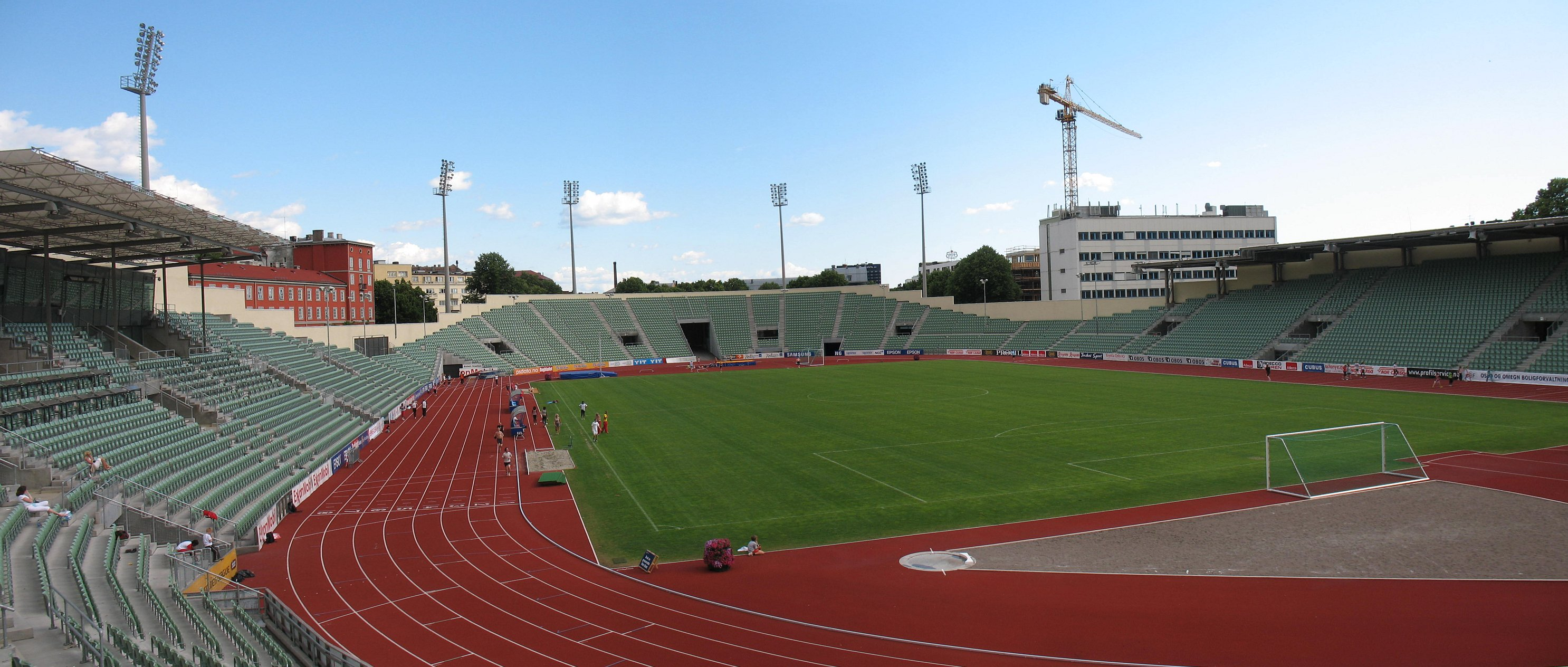
Bislett Stadion hosted speed skating at the 1952 Winter Olympics in Oslo.

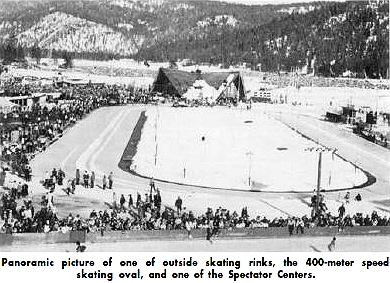
Squaw Valley Olympic Skating Rink hosted speed skating at the 1960 Winter Olympics.

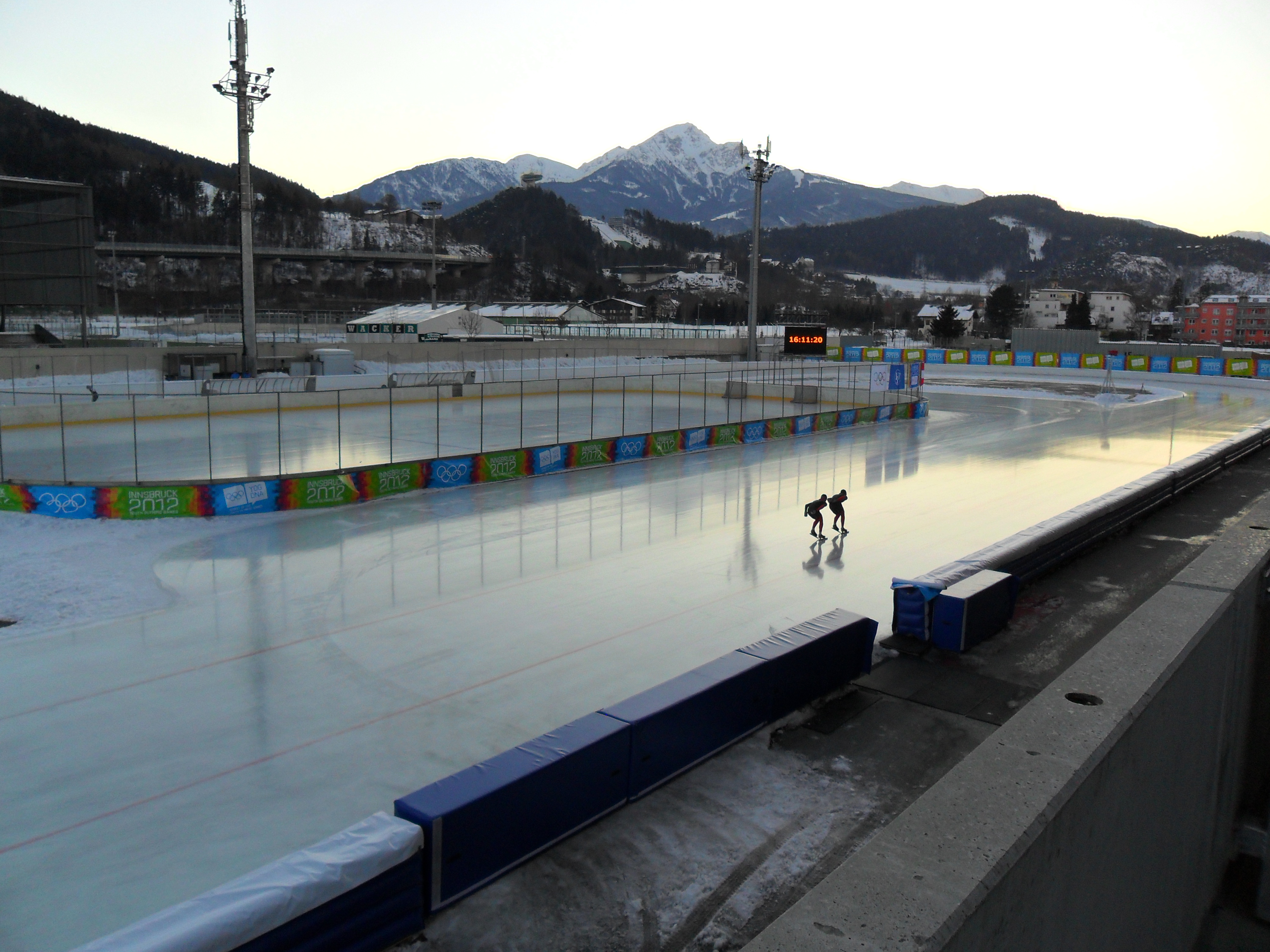
Eisschnelllaufbahn Innsbruck hosted speed skating at the 1964 and 1976 Winter Olympics.

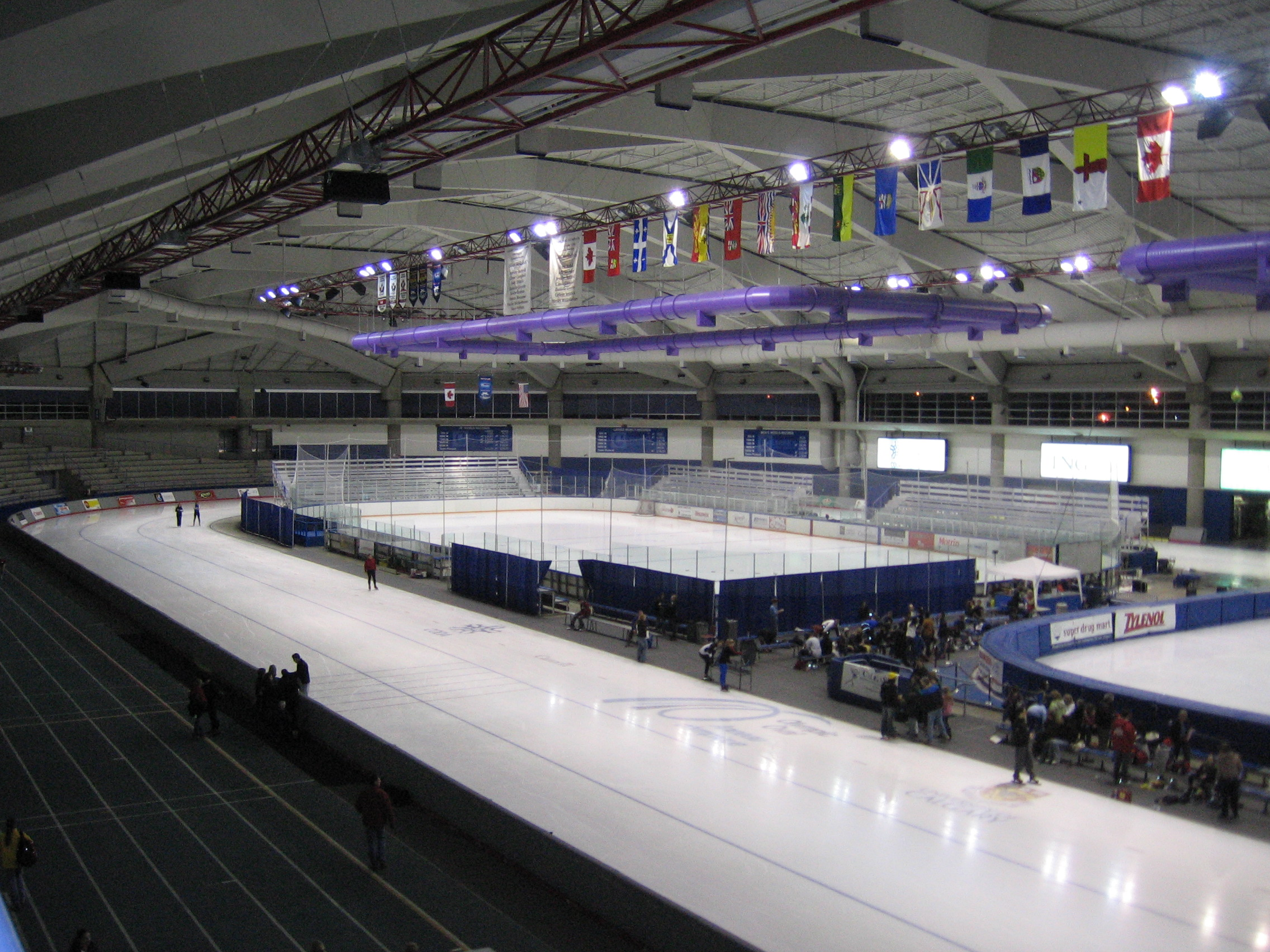
Olympic Oval hosted speed skating at the 1988 Winter Olympics in Calgary.

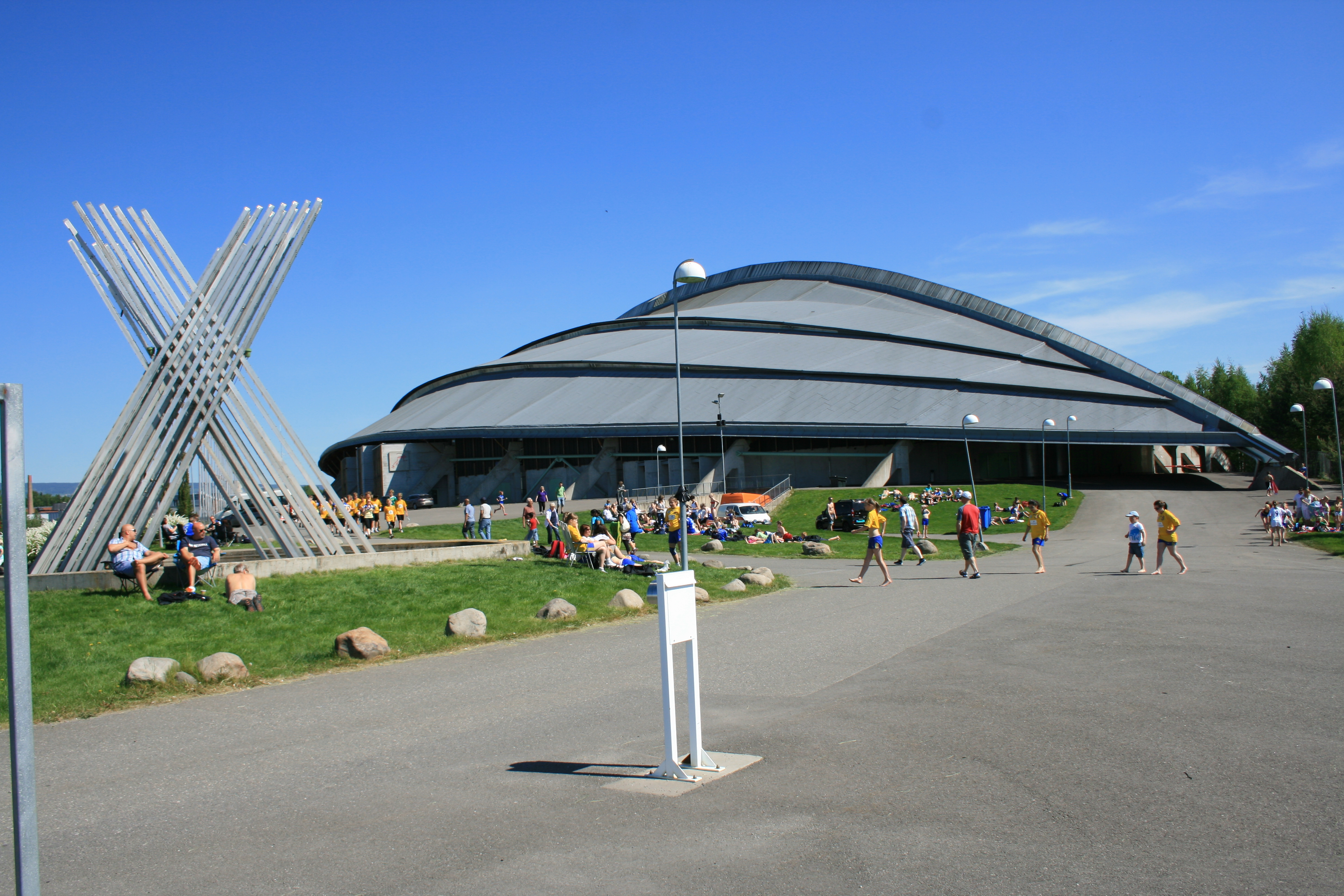
Vikingskipet hosted speed skating at the 1994 Winter Olympics in Lillehammer

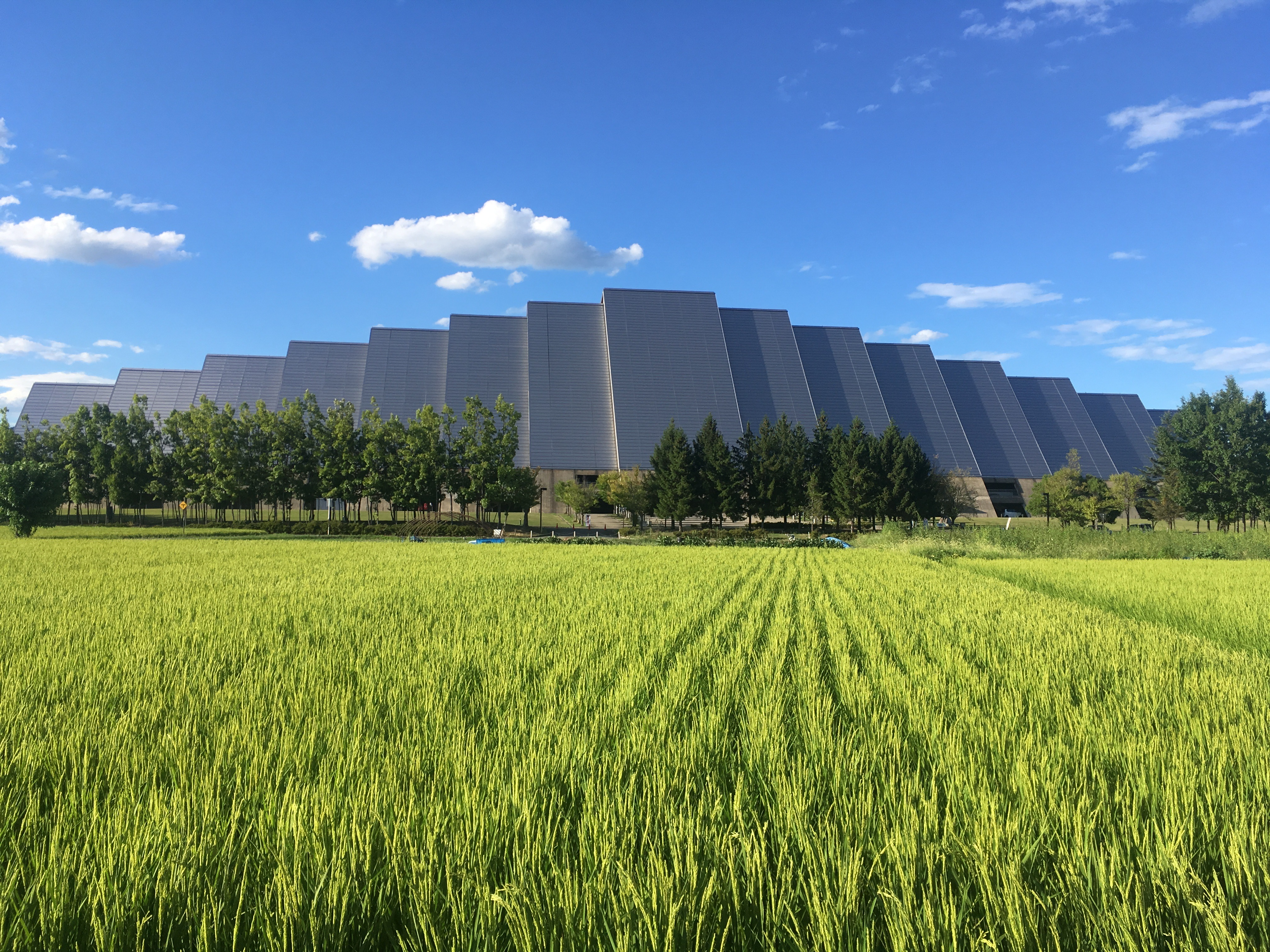
M-Wave hosted speed skating at the 1998 Winter Olympics in Nagano.

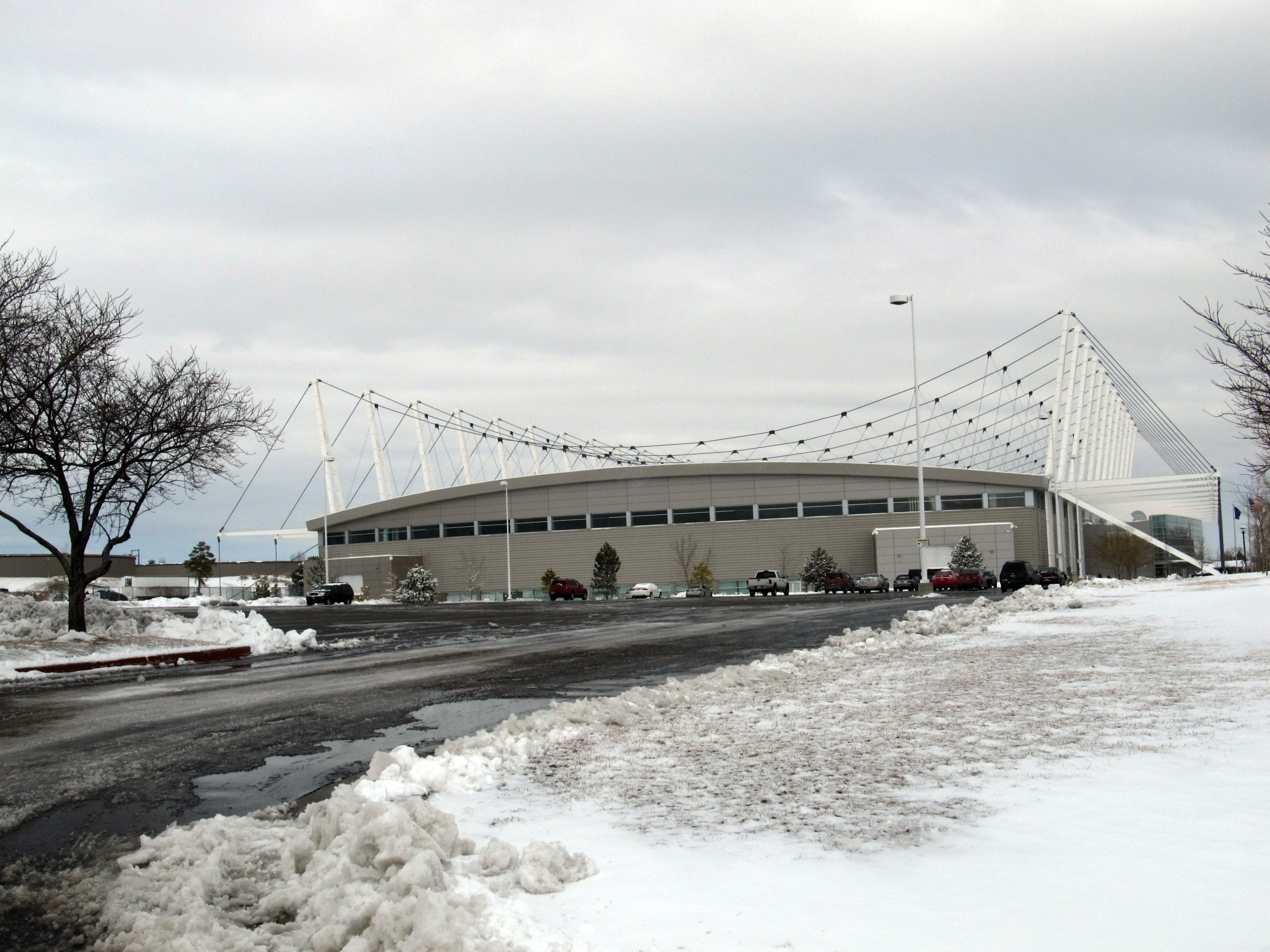
The Utah Olympic oval hosted speed skating at the 2002 Winter Olympics in Salt Lake City and will do so again at the 2034 Winter Olympics.

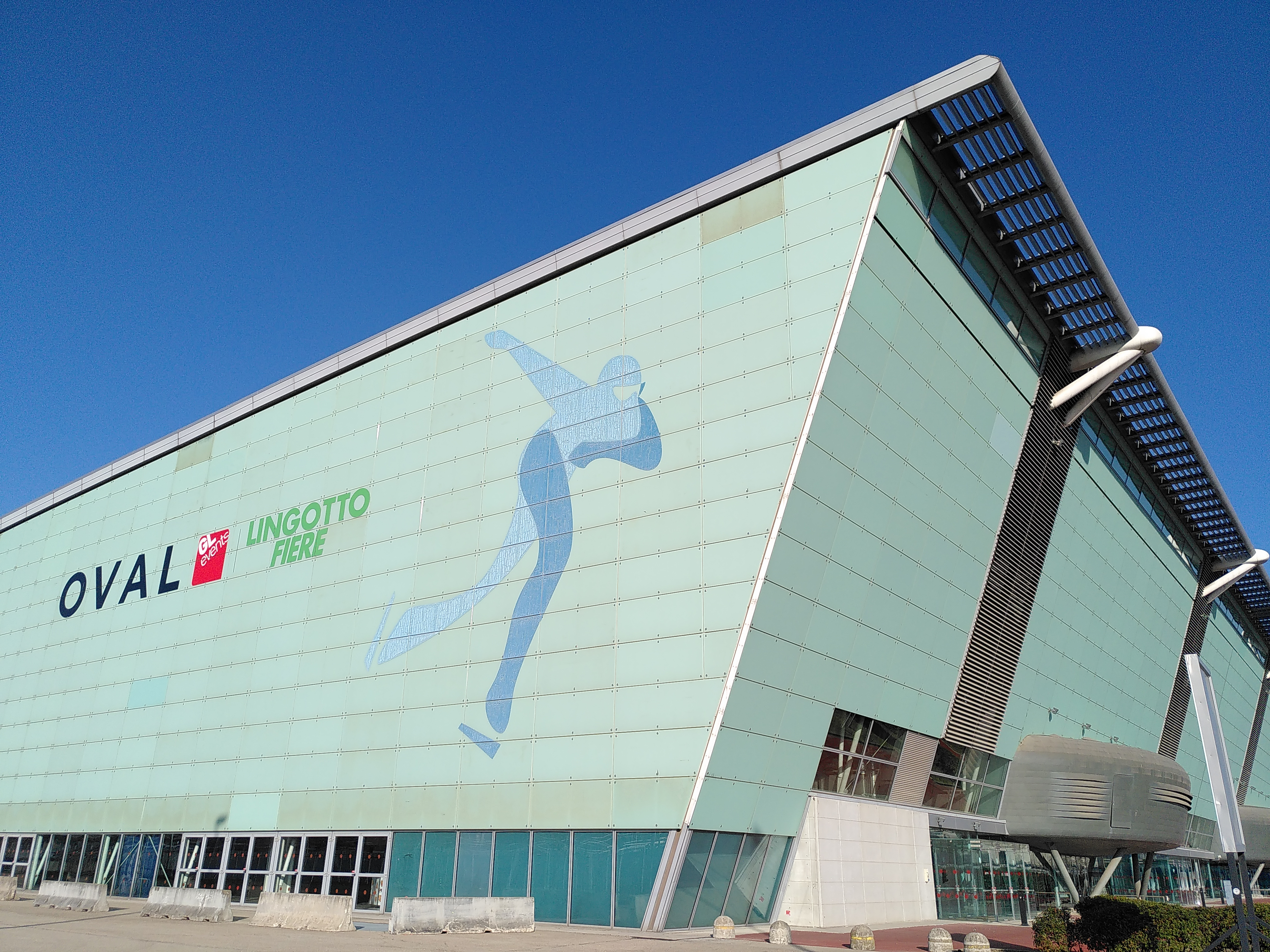
Oval Lingotto hosted speed skating at the 2006 Winter Olympics in Turin.

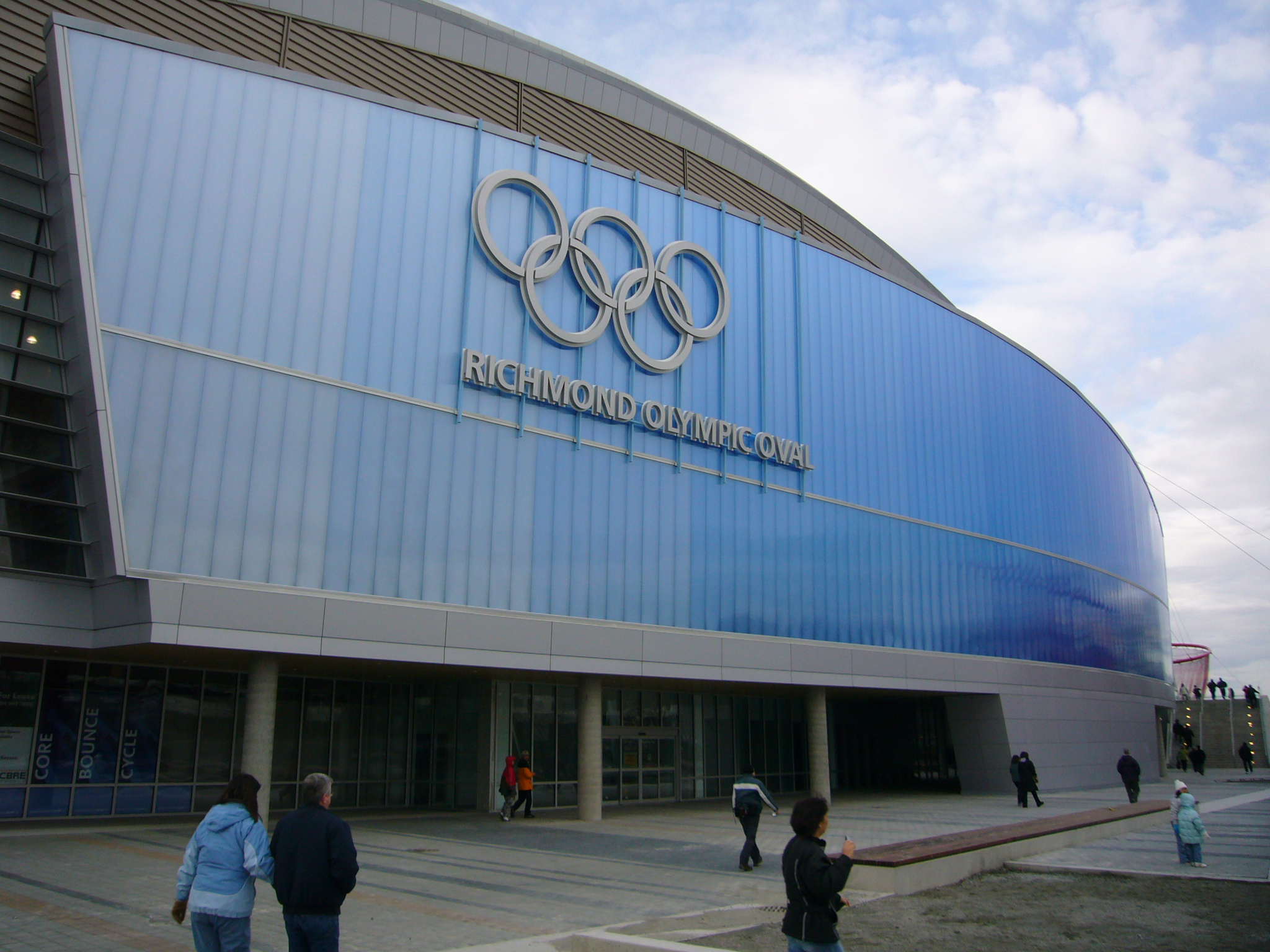
The Richmond Olympic Oval hosted speed skating at the 2010 Winter Olympics in Vancouver.

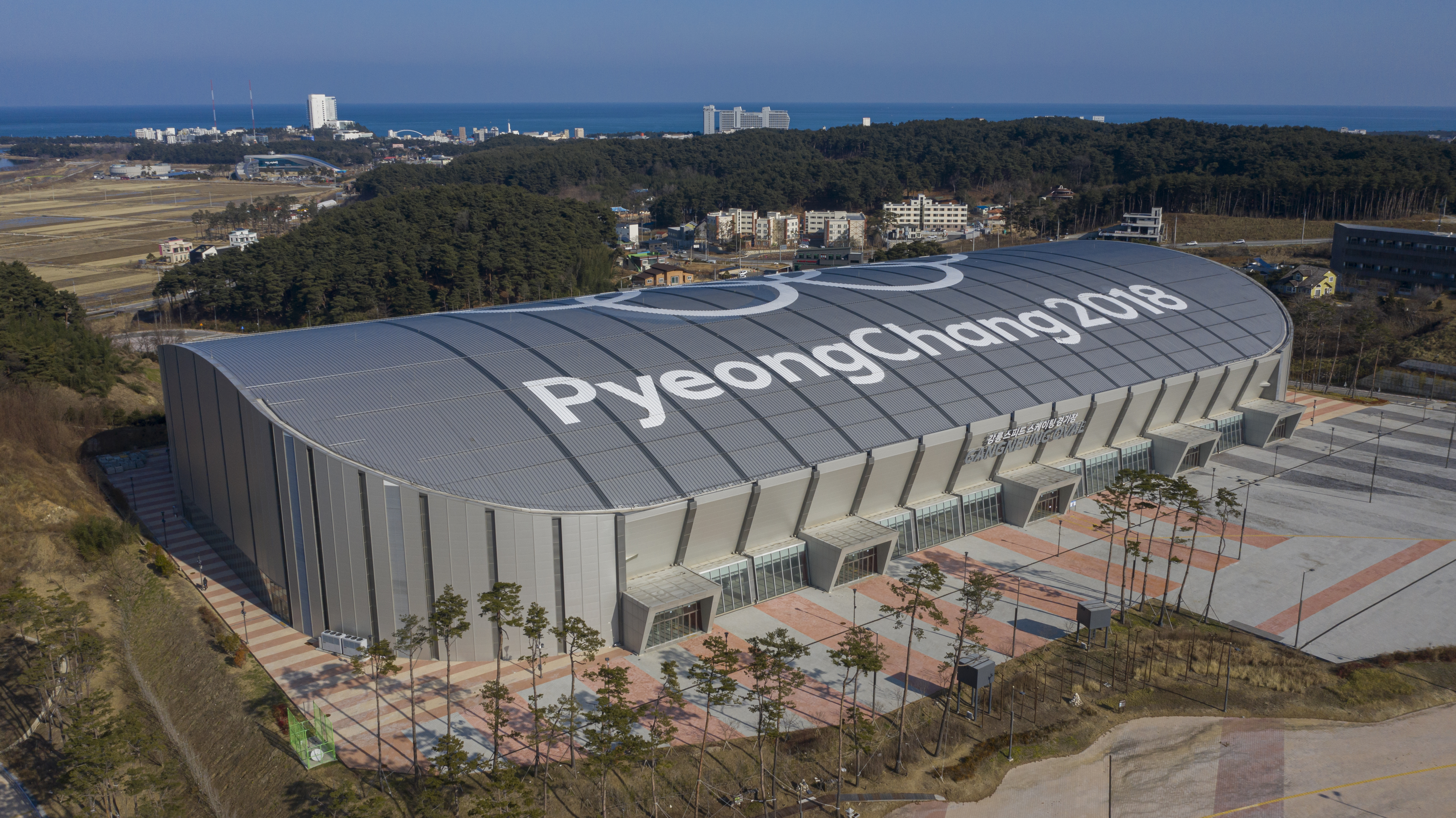
The Gangneung Oval hosted speed skating at the 2018 Winter Olympics in Pyeongchang.

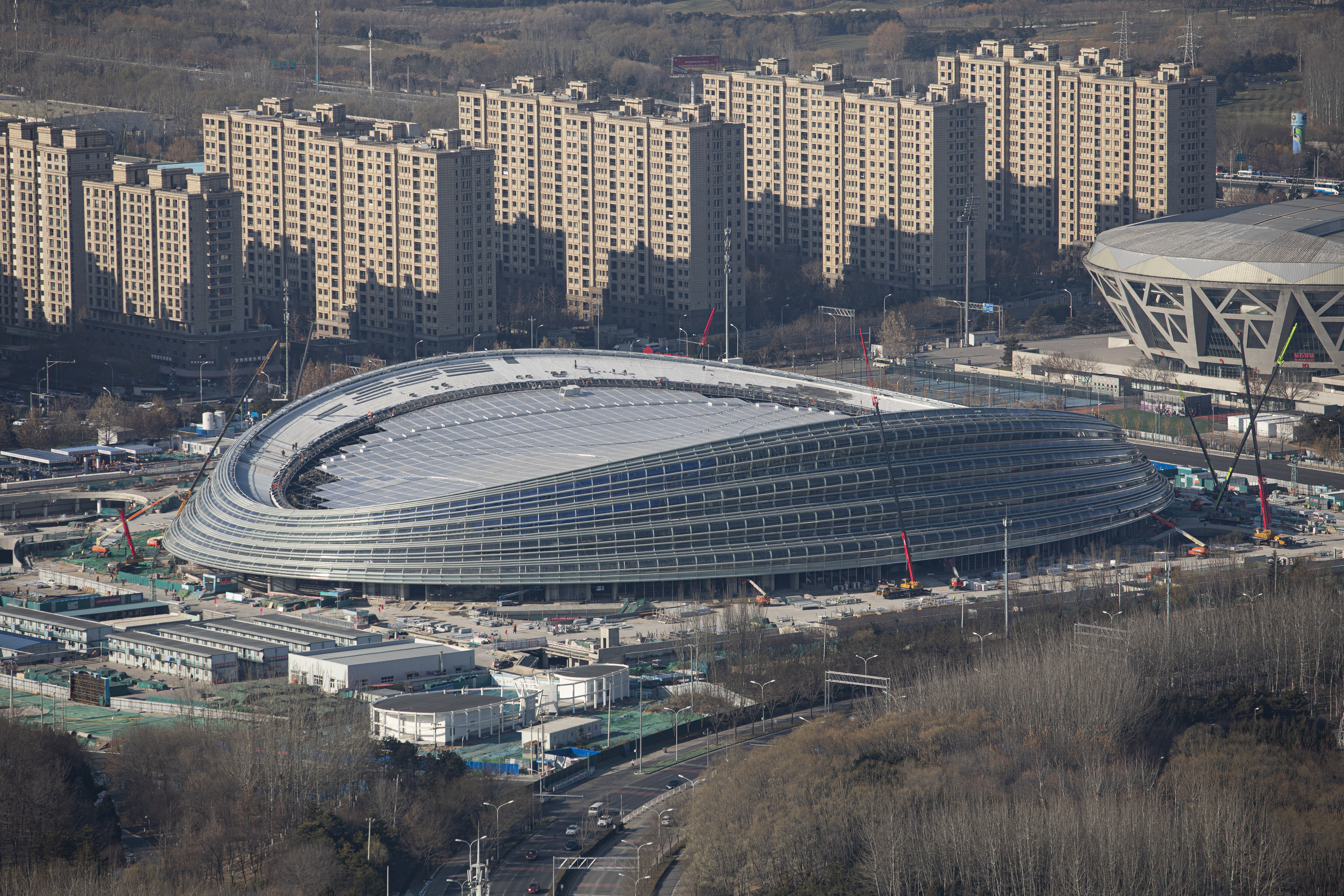
The Beijing National Speed Skating Oval hosted speed skating at the 2022 Winter Olympics.

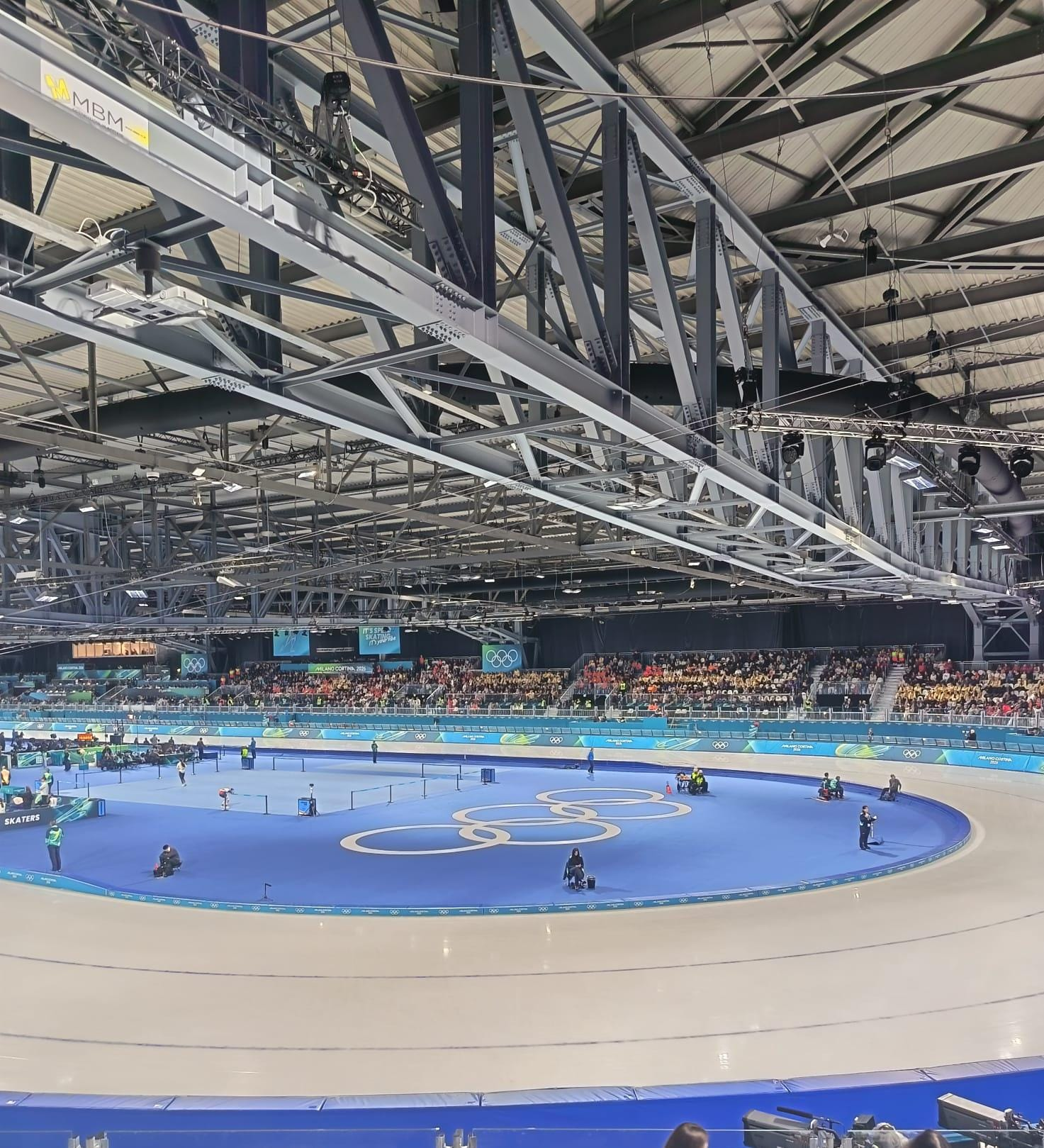
Fiera Milano hosted speed skating at the 2026 Winter Olympics in Milan.

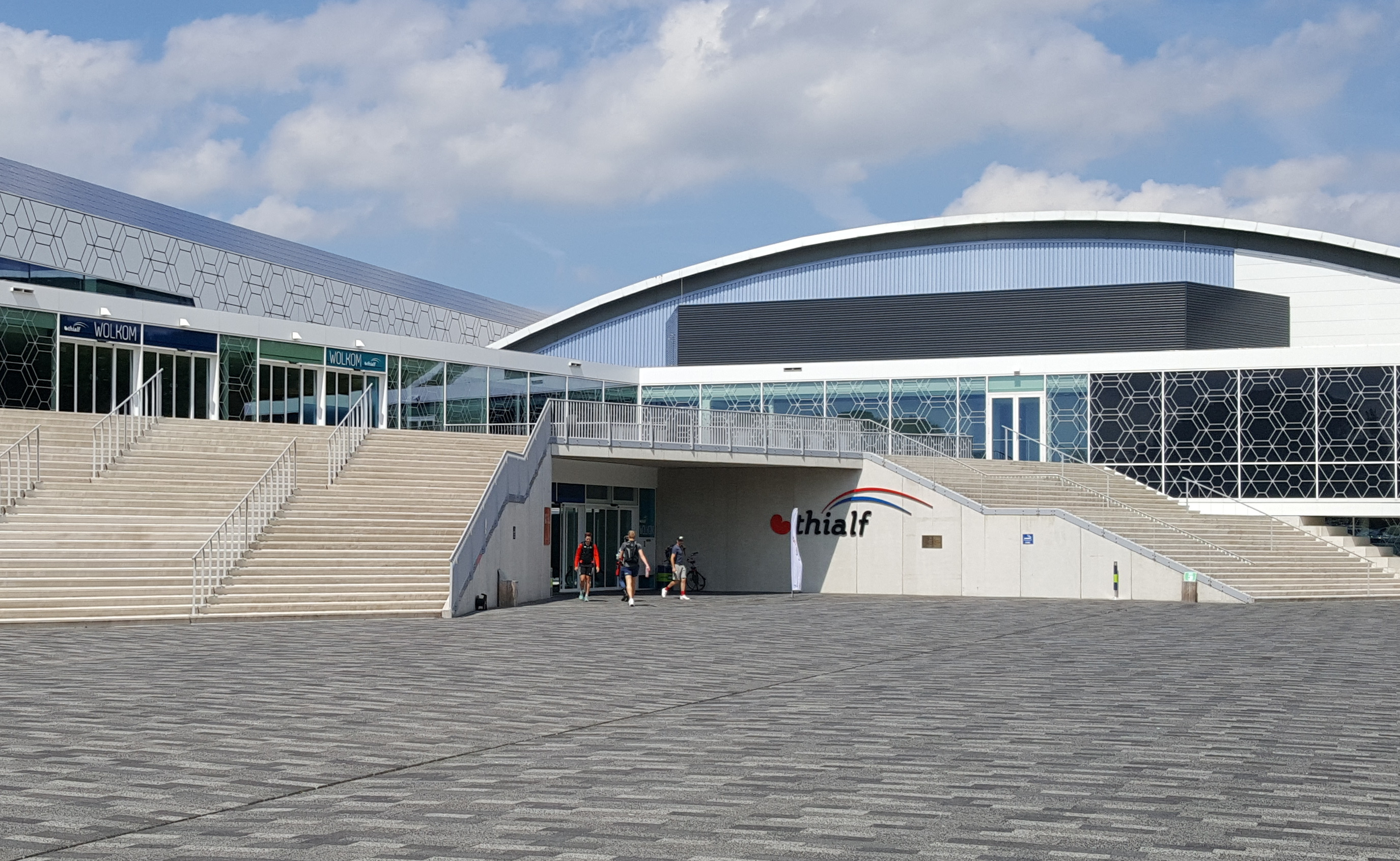
Thialf in Heerenveen, Netherlands will host speed skating for the 2030 Winter Olympics in the French Alps.
