= Albert Renaud (ice hockey) =

Canadian ice hockey player

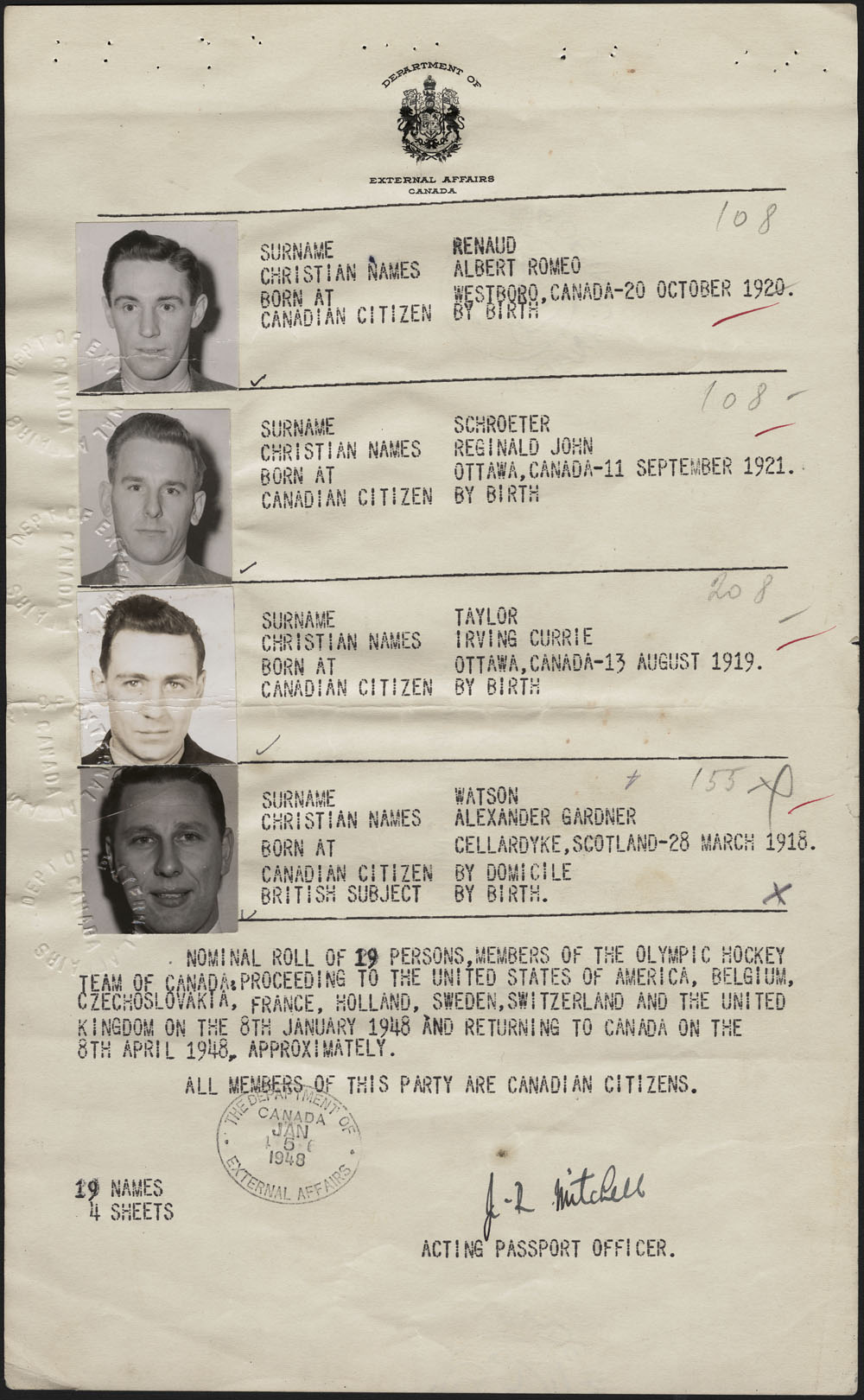
- Albert Renaud on the collective passport of the Olympic team in 1948
- Born: October 2, 1920 Ottawa, Ontario, Canada
- Died: December 19, 2012 (aged 92) Ottawa, Ontario, Canada
- Height: 5 ft 9 in (175 cm)
- Weight: 165 lb (75 kg; 11 st 11 lb)
- Position: Right wing
- Shoots: Left
- Played for: Ottawa RCAF Flyers
Medal record
Men's ice hockey
Representing Canada
Gold medal – first place	1948 St. Moritz	Ice hockey

Albert Roméo "Ab" Renaud, sometimes referred to as Albert Ranaud, (October 2, 1920 – December 19, 2012) was a Canadian ice hockey player. He was a member of the Ottawa RCAF Flyers who won the gold medal in ice hockey for Canada at the 1948 Winter Olympics in St. Moritz.

In 2001, Renaud was honoured by the Canadian Forces when it was announced that the 1948 RCAF Flyers were selected as Canada's greatest military athletes of the 20th century. In February 2008, Renaud and former teammate Henri-André Laperrière attended a luncheon in honor of the 60th anniversary of the 1948 Olympics and accepted replica gold medals on behalf of the team. It was announced at the event that the RCAF Flyers would be inducted into the Canadian Olympic Hall of Fame in April 2008.
