= Norman Dawe =

Canadian sports executive (1898–1948)

- Born: Robert Norman Dawe; October 18, 1898; Montreal, Quebec, Canada
- Died: January 4, 1948 (aged 49); Montreal, Quebec, Canada
- Resting place: Mount Royal Cemetery
- Occupation: Human resources manager
- Employer: Canadian Car and Foundry
- Known for: Quebec Amateur Hockey Association president, Canadian Amateur Hockey Association vice-president

Robert Norman Dawe (October 18, 1898 – January 4, 1948) was a Canadian sports executive. He originated as an ice hockey referee for minor ice hockey games in Verdun, Quebec, before becoming involved in the administrative aspect of sports. He was a member of the local YMCA executive, served as secretary of the Verdun Playgrounds Commission from 1923 to 1948, and organized the Verdun Hockey Board. He served as a member of the Quebec Amateur Hockey Association (QAHA) executive committee for 23 seasons, and helped establish a provincial referee's board in 1936. In Montreal and Verdun, he was involved in girls' fastpitch softball. He served as the Montreal Ladies' Major Softball League president from 1940 to 1945, then was president of the Verdun Ladies' Softball League from 1945 to 1947. He began organizing Canadian football in 1945, when he established the Verdun Juvenile Football League and served as president.

Dawe served as a QAHA vice-president from 1936 until 1940, and as president from 1940 to 1947. He advocated for the development of minor hockey, welcomed the Montreal Minor Hockey Association into QAHA membership, and oversaw the establishment of a constitution to for minor hockey in Quebec. He felt that retaining players in junior ice hockey until they were eligible to become professional was a primary issue for the QAHA, and oversaw the split of junior hockey into tiers to better identify the talent. He encouraged leagues to support Canadian military hockey teams during World War II, and his financial management of the QAHA allowed the military teams to play without paying an entrance fee. He worked with the Quebec Senior Hockey League to resolve disputes on player registrations, the sharing of gate receipts, and travel expenses in the playoffs. He sought for the QAHA to have more say on the dates and locations of Allan Cup and Memorial Cup playoffs games were determined, and to be a voice for hockey in Eastern Canada.

The QAHA made Dawe a life member after seven years as president, and he was feted by multiple sporting organizations with Norman Dawe Day at the Montreal Forum on March 30, 1947. The Canadian Amateur Hockey Association (CAHA) named Dawe to its minor hockey committee from 1942 to 1945, which gradually increased grants to fund the development of minor hockey across Canada. He served as a vice-president of the CAHA from 1945 to 1948, and oversaw the national playoffs for Eastern Canada. He led efforts to bolster the Ottawa RCAF Flyers in advance of ice hockey at the 1948 Winter Olympics, who then won the gold medal representing Canada. He remained active in hockey until his death from a heart attack at age 49, and was a candidate for the Verdun mayoral election later in 1948. He was posthumously made the namesake of two Norman Dawe Memorial Trophies in Quebec, and the Norman Dawe Memorial Sports Association was formed in 1948 to promote hockey and other youth sports in Verdun. The Gazette wrote that Dawe was, "one of the men who has done most for Canada's national sport"; and that he was "one of Montreal's best goodwill ambassadors".

== Early life and family ==
Robert Norman Dawe was born on October 18, 1898, in the Point Saint Charles neighbourhood of Montreal. He had six sisters and was the son of Robert Dawe. Dawe's father originated from Newfoundland, and his grandfather was a part-owner of the Canada Leather Company. Dawe resided in Verdun from age four onward, worked for 30 years at the Canadian Car and Foundry, and had become the assistant manager of human resources. He was married to Dorothy Mary Busby, the daughter of Montreal journalist Thomas H. Busby. They raised two sons, one of whom died as a child due to pneumonia after playing hockey outside in the winter. (Note: In addition to the son who died as a child, Dawe had one living son when he died in 1948.)

== Verdun community service ==
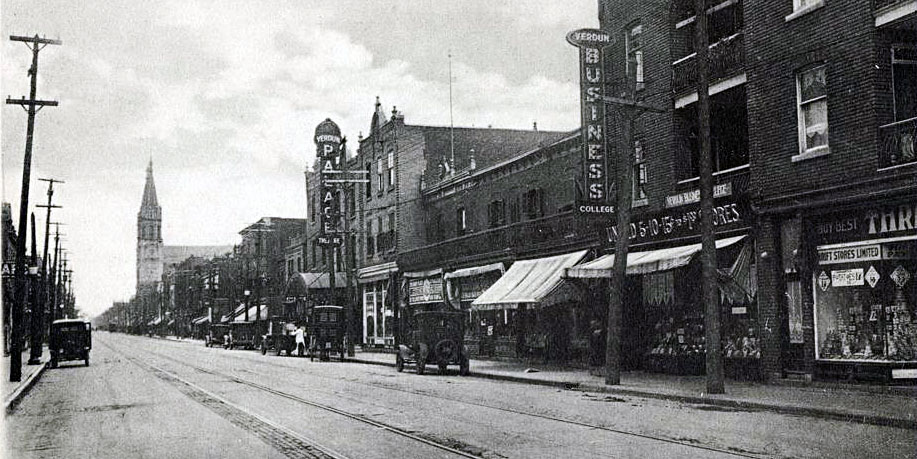
Wellington Street in downtown Verdun, c. 1930

Dawe was a Freemason as a member of the Elgin Lodge A.F. and A.M. He was described by The Gazette as "well known in Verdun's social life and a prominent member of the YMCA", where he sat on the board of directors. He served as secretary of the Verdun Playgrounds Commission from 1923 to 1948, organized youth and amateur sports in Verdun, and advocated for programs to include both the adults and children in families.

In Montreal and Verdun, Dawe was involved in girls' fastpitch softball. He was an umpire in the Montreal Ladies' Major Softball League during the 1930s, served as the league's president from 1940 to 1945, then was president of the Verdun Ladies' Softball League from 1945 to 1947. He oversaw upgrades to Viau Park in 1941, which included new dugouts and floodlights, higher fencing, and increased spectator seating. In the same season, he implemented an interlocking schedule with the Ottawa Ladies' Softball League which featured doubleheaders on alternating weekends. He had the Woodland Park softball field reserved for the Verdun Women's Softball League; and led the league into an affiliation with the Women's Amateur Athletic Federation of Canada to maintain amateur status for players who also participated in organized basketball.

In 1945, Dawe began organizing Canadian football played in the autumn to fill the gap between the baseball and ice hockey seasons. He established the Verdun Juvenile Football League, served as its president, had football goalposts and floodlights installed at Woodland Park for games, and affiliated the league and its four teams with the Quebec Rugby Football Union. The league added a midget age group for the 1946 season, and attendance for the season exceeded 22,000 spectators for the midget and juvenile games. The league included four teams in both age groups for the 1947 season, and Dawe presided over the juvenile division of the Quebec Rugby Football Union.

In politics, Dawe was secretary of the Verdun Co-operative Commonwealth Federation association in 1942, and sat on the nominating committee of the Verdun Voters' League in 1946. He was petitioned by 3,000 signatures to be a candidate in the Verdun mayoral election on April 1, 1948. He accepted the nomination but made no announcement of a platform.

== Ice hockey career ==
=== Early involvement ===
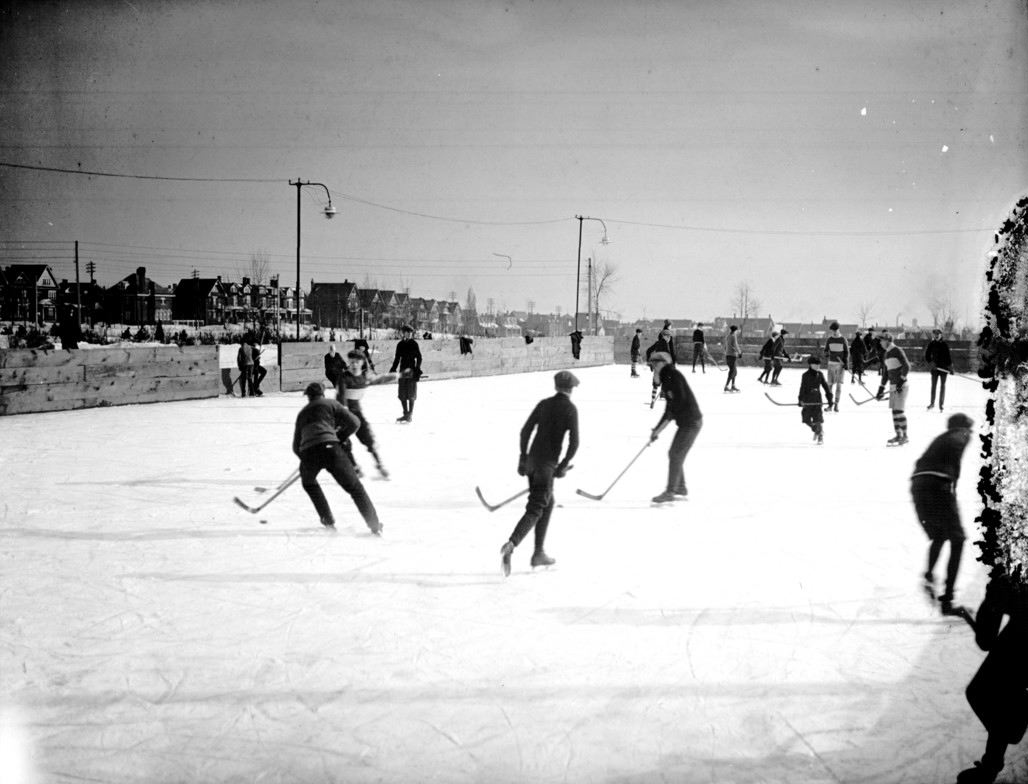
Hockey on an outdoor rink, c. 1923

Dawe was an ice hockey referee for minor ice hockey games and struggled to officiate after the death of his son, and stated "every kid out there reminds me of my own boy". Dawe soon became involved in the administrative aspect of the game. He organized the Verdun Hockey Board in 1923 to oversee local minor hockey, then served as a member of the Quebec Amateur Hockey Association (QAHA) executive committee for 23 seasons. The Gazette credited Dawe for spending most of his time with the juvenile, midget and bantam age groups, and attending many minor hockey games played during the winter on outdoor rinks.

During the mid-1930s, Dawe refereed in the Montreal and District Intermediate Hockey League, and officiated for the QAHA in the provincial intermediate level playoffs. In 1936, he officiated the Eastern Canada final in the Dominion Women's Amateur Hockey Association playoffs. During the 1935–36 season playoffs, the QAHA established a referee's board and named Dawe the convenor. He sought to unify all officials in Quebec under a governing body to assign games in the provincial playoffs and establish a grading system for referees.

=== QAHA vice-president ===
Dawe served as a vice-president of the QAHA from the 1936–37 season until 1940. He was a regular delegate to Canadian Amateur Hockey Association (CAHA) general meetings, and presided over minor hockey within Quebec. In 1938, Dawe helped establish an inter-provincial playoff for the QAHA juvenile age group champion versus the Ottawa and District Amateur Hockey Association (ODAHA) champion. Registrations in minor hockey had increased to 200 teams by 1940, and Dawe oversaw expansion of the provincial playoffs to include a championship for the midget age group. He then scheduled provincial finals to be played at the Montreal Forum due to increased attendance for the minor hockey playoffs.

=== QAHA president ===
==== 1940–41 season ====
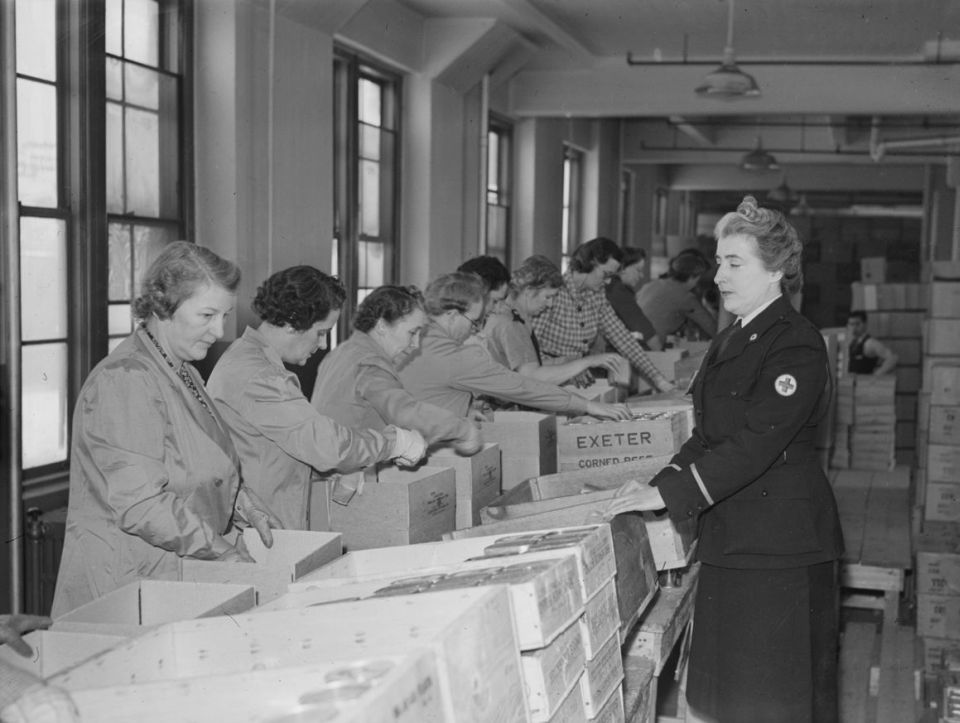
Canadian Red Cross volunteers during World War II.

Dawe was elected president of the QAHA on April 29, 1940. He had served as chairman of QAHA minor hockey for three years, which saw minor hockey in Quebec grow to its greatest registration at the time. The QAHA agreed to appoint a new chairman once he became president. The QAHA executive formed a committee to oversee the referee's board, when the latter did not operate in the previous season.

Beginning in 1940, Dawe oversaw efforts by the QAHA to host benefit games to aid the Canadian Red Cross during World War II. He wanted the QAHA to support hockey teams composed of Canadian servicemen during the war, and appointed a committee to liaise with military leaders on how the QAHA could provide a place to play or provide financial assistance. Military leagues from Quebec City, Montreal, and Sherbrooke, then affiliated with the QAHA.

The Gazette reported rumors that Quebec Senior Hockey League (QSHL) players discussed strike action in protest of lower financial compensation given to players for their expenses, which was blamed the implementation of a reserve list system which prevented teams from competing for the same players. Dawe and the QAHA arbitrated disputes where teams disagreed on player registrations, but the reserve list remained as a gentlemen's agreement among the teams.

The QAHA wanted more influence into how the CAHA determined the dates and location of playoffs games for the Allan Cup and the Memorial Cup. Dawe and the QAHA objected to the 1941 Allan Cup playoffs beginning earlier than usual, which shortened the QSHL playoffs. When the Montreal Royals advanced to the 1941 Memorial Cup semifinals, he lobbied for games to be played at the Montreal Forum instead of all games in Toronto. The CAHA voted against his request due to budget constraints and travel costs. In the 1941 Memorial Cup final, the Montreal Royals won both games played on home ice, but failed to win the cup when since they lost all three games played in Toronto.

==== 1941–42 season ====
In April 1941, The Gazette credited the QAHA for having carefully handled expenses which profited more than C$2,400 during wartime conditions, and allowed the QAHA to invest $4,000 into victory bonds for the war effort. Dawe helped arrange a game between alumni of the Montreal Maroons and Montreal Canadiens in February 1942, to further contribute to victory bond fundraising.

Dawe remained involved with the QAHA minor hockey board as an ex-officio member. By 1941, the board oversaw its own player registrations, and had grown to include a vice-chairman and district convenors. Under his guidance in November 1941, the QAHA minor hockey board established the first constitution for minor hockey in the province. To benefit minor hockey players, the QAHA produced the instructional film Hockey Fundamentals in December 1941, which featured coach Dick Irvin and players from the Montreal Canadiens.

The Allan Cup was the championship trophy for senior hockey overseen by the CAHA.

Dawe sought for teams from Eastern Canada to have more home games during the Memorial Cup and Allan Cup playoffs. At the CAHA general meeting in April 1941, his motion was approved to allow the eastern and western portions of the national playoffs to be handled by the respective CAHA branches. Despite the approval, the CAHA had expressed concerns about the low gate receipts at the Montreal Forum, compared to expected profits elsewhere, and reserved the right to change the location of the games.

The QSHL proposed forming an Eastern Canada Hockey Association in May 1941, which Dawe supported for the sake of the Allan Cup playoffs. Under the proposal, the QAHA, the ODAHA, and the Maritime Amateur Hockey Association, would work together in the playoffs to determine one team to play against the Ontario champion; and share the profits from the gate receipts among themselves before the CAHA took its share. QSHL president George Slater felt that any team which reached the Allan Cup finals would face bankruptcy without a better financial deal, since the CAHA kept all profits from gate receipts in inter-branch playoffs. Dawe stated that the proposal may seem like mutiny, but that the QAHA wanted to form a new association within the CAHA, and voice Eastern Canada's concerns. The QAHA also contested that with more playoffs games, Montreal could be built into a junior hockey city with profitable gate receipts.

In the 1942 Allan Cup playoffs, the QAHA wanted the winners of the QSHL and the Eastern Townships League to play a series for the provincial senior championship. Dawe stated that the QAHA would be unable to meet the March 25 deadline set by the CAHA without an extension until March 31, and noted that it was the first instance in which the QAHA had made such a request. The CAHA denied the extension and the QSHL final was shortened to a two-game total-goals series. Had the change not been made, it would have been the first time that Quebec did not participate in the Allan Cup playoffs.

The Memorial Cup was the championship trophy for junior hockey overseen by the CAHA.

In the 1942 Memorial Cup playoffs, the Montreal Royals defeated the Halifax Junior Canadians by a 12–3 score in the first game of a best-of-three series at Montreal Forum. The remainder of series was cancelled due to poor attendance and gate receipts. The Halifax team claimed that they were treated poorly and vowed never to return, since they were not given any accommodations or travel expenses. Dawe denied that it was the QAHA's responsibility to provide expenses, or that any communication had been received from Halifax or the CAHA on the matter.

==== 1942–43 season ====
Dawe was named to the minor ice hockey committee at the 1942 CAHA general meeting, which recommended to increase grants to each branch for the promotion of minor hockey and to oversee how the money was spent. The CAHA chose to increase travel expenses to teams during the playoffs instead of forming the Eastern Canada Hockey Association, and the CAHA executives were empowered to cancel any series which would not be profitable. The CAHA also directed that leagues make their schedules to reduce travelling due to wartime conditions.

In November 1942, CAHA past-president George Dudley felt that, "the QAHA now has the best executive in its history". The QAHA made a profit in the previous season, despite that registration decreased by 519 players during the war. The QAHA had purchased almost $7,000 in victory bonds by 1942, permitted teams composed of military servicemen to play without paying an entrance fee or annual dues, and Dawe urged for more support of military sports organizations. The QAHA also planned a roll of honour for any of its players who had enlisted or would enlist in the Canadian military.

The QAHA wanted to prevent stacked teams in its senior leagues, limited teams to signing a maximum of four former National Hockey League (NHL) players, and Dawe urged the CAHA to enact a similar rule. He also sought for the QAHA to do everything in its power to promote junior ice hockey. He felt that junior leagues would suffer since professional teams wanted to sign younger players to contracts, due to the shortage of older players during the war.

Dawe planned to expand minor hockey in Quebec by targeting ages 10 to 17, and assist the players to be part of a team outside of a school program. He aimed to register 5,000 players in the bantam, midget, juvenile age groups, and the expansion to younger age groups resulted in 1,000 schoolboys registered from Verdun. The QAHA wanted floodlights on outdoor ice rinks to play minor hockey games at night, despite national efforts to conserve electricity during the war. CAHA president Frank Sargent forwarded a letter from Dawe and the QAHA to C. D. Howe, the minister of the Department of Munitions and Supply, which appealed for an exception for the sake of the kids playing hockey. The QAHA also petitioned city councils in Verdun and other cities in Quebec to use rinks at night. Dawe stated in an interview with The Gazette in December 1942, "It is going to be a fight to get the extra rinks and hours but it is worth it. I've enjoyed having a battle on my hands, especially when it is something for the youngsters".

==== 1943–44 season ====
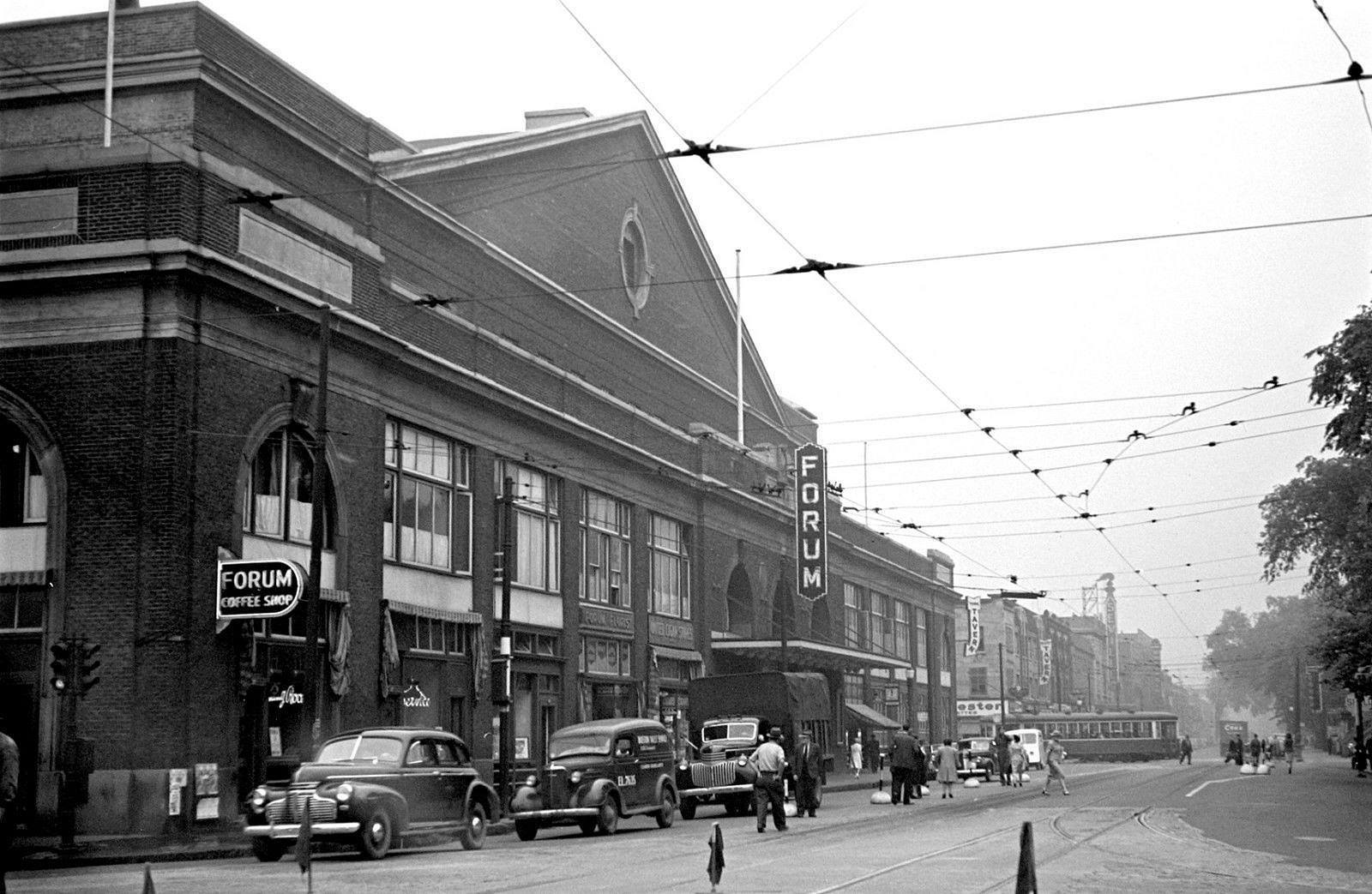
The Montreal Forum hosted multiple leagues under the QAHA's jurisdiction.

Dawe was returned to the CAHA minor hockey committee, which increased grants to $1,500 to each branch to develop minor hockey. The CAHA increased travel grants to intermediate level teams, and named Dawe a trustee of the Colonel J. Burke Trophy, awarded to the intermediate level champion Eastern Canada. The QAHA continued to grow when it welcomed the Montreal Minor Hockey Association into membership, which controlled almost 100 hockey rinks in Greater Montreal. Dawe advocated for more rulebooks to be printed, and education sessions for coaches and managers to reduce the number of protests in a season.

The QAHA divided its junior ice hockey leagues into tiers, when it adopted the junior-B rating, similar to other CAHA branches. Dawe suggested dividing the Eastern Canada junior playoffs into A and B tiers in co-operation with the CAHA, and felt that it would give the lower calibre teams an opportunity to have longer playoffs. Dawe also felt that the QAHA's future depended on retaining its talent from minor hockey programs, and that the tiers helped identify junior hockey talent, and would retain the graduates of the juvenile age group instead of those players accepting offers in the United States.

Dawe proposed that military teams be grouped into their own league, since they had dominated the senior hockey leagues in competition with the civilian teams. The QAHA gave its districts the choice of separating the military and civilian teams during the regular season, then having mutual playoffs.

==== 1944–45 season ====
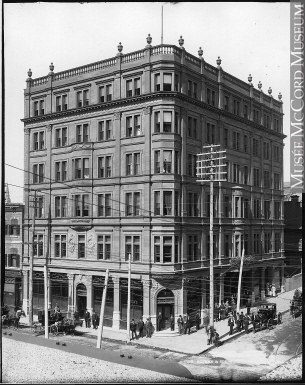
The Queen's Hotel regularly hosted QAHA annual meetings while Dawe was president, and the 1944 CAHA general meeting. (Note: The QAHA held its annual meetings at the Queen's Hotel in 1940, 1941, 1942, 1943, 1944, and 1945. The CAHA held its general meeting at the Queen's Hotel in 1944.)

The QAHA hosted the 1944 CAHA general meeting in Montreal. Dawe was returned to the CAHA minor hockey committee, which increased grants for the development of minor hockey. He also sat on the resolutions committee and advocated for stricter enforcement of transfer regulations for amateurs who became professional or moved internationally. According to Dawe, retaining players in junior hockey until they were eligible to become professional, was a primary issue for the QAHA. He felt that young men who signed professional contracts did not fully understand the significance, and that remaining in junior hockey longer would allow players to become fully developed and have longer professional careers.

The ODAHA denied permission for the Ottawa Commandos and the Hull Volants to play in the QSHL, and wanted the teams to play in the Ottawa City Hockey League where it was in the association's best financial interest. The QSHL subsequently voted to operate the 1944–45 season with four teams independent of the QAHA and CAHA. Dawe remained willing to co-operate with the QSHL as long as a settlement could be reached with the ODAHA that allowed the teams to play under the jurisdiction of the QAHA. He attempted to mediate the dispute by allowing the ODAHA to keep the five per cent share of gate receipts for the Ottawa and Hull teams, instead of the funds being paid to the QAHA. After a week of discussions, the ODAHA accepted Dawe's recommendation.

==== 1945–46 season ====
Dawe was re-elected to a sixth consecutive term on May 22, 1945, the longest tenure at the time for any QAHA president. Rumors about the QSHL becoming a professional minor league persisted in The Gazette, which reported that teams were upset with the amount of travel expenses given by the CAHA in the Allan Cup playoffs. Dawe felt that if the QSHL became professional, then the QAHA would lose most of its income from gate receipts and consequently amateur hockey in Quebec would suffer. He felt that senior teams had an obligation to support amateur hockey which was the source of senior players.

Dawe raised objections at the QSHL annual meeting. No decision was made on whether to become professional, and the league sought more information from the NHL on the benefits and finances of a professional minor league. The Winnipeg Free Press reported that the QSHL was the best senior hockey league in Canada, and that NHL executives resented that the Montreal Canadiens had the first pick of any player from the league. Dawe stated that Lester Patrick of the New York Rangers, and Art Ross of the Boston Bruins, wanted to see the QSHL and other CAHA senior leagues become professional for the best interests of the other NHL teams. The QSHL remained an amateur league for the 1945–46 season, which resulted in the QAHA being in its best financial position to date with the majority of income from QSHL gate receipts.

==== 1946–47 season ====
By the 1946–47 season, the QAHA had grown to include 59 leagues, 281 clubs, and increased its registration by 1,847 players from the previous season. The QAHA referee's committee had grown to become a self sufficient, and established a scouting and evaluation process to encourage new officials. Dawe served as an ex-officio member of the committee, and sought for more consistency in the interpretation of rules during the national playoffs. He also wanted to stop the abuse of referees by players, and give indefinite suspensions to any offender.

Dawe was feted by multiple sporting organizations with Norman Dawe Day at the Montreal Forum on March 30, 1947, during the first intermission of a QSHL playoffs game. Recognition was given to him from the Montreal Royals, the Canadian Arena Company, the QSHL, the Junior Amateur Hockey Association, the Montreal Intermediate Hockey League, the Verdun Hockey Board, the Verdun Softball organization, the Verdun Football organization, the Verdun Playground Commission, the Verdun Major Ladies Softball League, and the Association Sportif de Verdun. Fred Roberts wrote in The Gazette that Dawe was, "one of the men who has done most for Canada's national sport"; "has always worked fervently for the betterment of the game"; his slogan is "please everybody at all times"; and that he was "one of Montreal's best goodwill ambassadors". Dawe received a gladstone bag, electric clock, marble desk set, a silver vase and other gifts. A spectator quipped in reaction to the number of gifts that, "He's got enough luggage now to equip the entire QAHA on a two-week vacation".

The QAHA hosted the 1947 CAHA general meeting in Quebec City, then Dawe withdrew as a candidate to be re-elected. He was made a life member after seven years as the QAHA president, and was succeeded by Azarie Choquet at the 1947 general meeting. Dawe returned to the Verdun Hockey Board as its president for the 1947–48 season.

=== CAHA vice-president ===
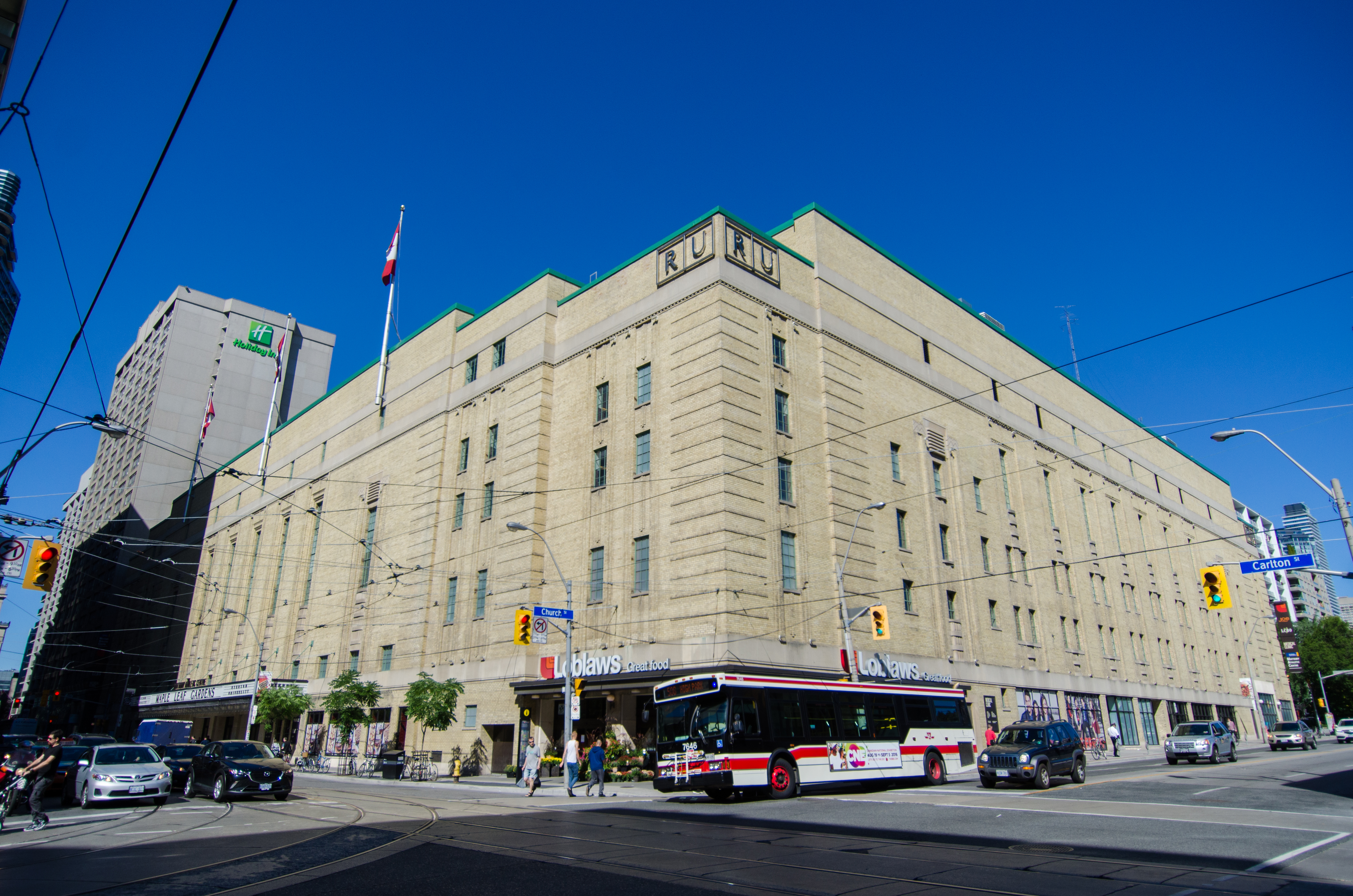
Maple Leaf Gardens

Dawe served as second vice-president of the CAHA for two years beginning in April 1945. He sat on the CAHA committee to publish the first common hockey rulebook with the NHL, and to find ways to speed up the game by eliminating delays. He oversaw the junior and senior playoffs in Eastern Canada in 1946 and 1947. At the 1946 general meeting, the CAHA allocated the Memorial Cup final to Western Canada, and the Allan Cup final to Eastern Canada. Dawe and CAHA president Al Pickard led a committee which made a framework that the western champion could choose to travel to Toronto due to better financial returns anticipated for games played at Maple Leaf Gardens.

The CAHA struggled to find a team willing to represent Canada at the 1947 Ice Hockey World Championships. Dawe and CAHA executives held multiple meetings in the final weeks before the deadline to reply to the invitation to send a team. The champions and finalists of both the 1946 Allan Cup and 1946 Memorial Cup all declined. The CAHA settled on the Edmonton Junior Canadians as the Western Canada junior finalists, but they too declined the offer when travel expenses were not guaranteed for the European tour. No willing team was found and Canada did not participate at the World Championships.

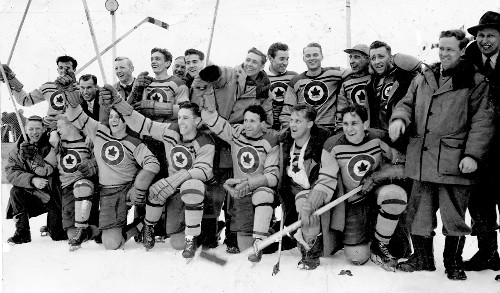
The Ottawa RCAF Flyers at the 1948 Winter Olympics.

In addition to the financial concerns, Dawe felt that Canada might not play in ice hockey at the 1948 Winter Olympics due to disagreements with the Ligue Internationale de Hockey sur Glace and the International Olympic Committee on the definition of an amateur. The CAHA insisted on using the definition of a player not actively engaged in professional ice hockey, according to the rosters of senior hockey teams in Canada. Dawe was elected first vice-president of the CAHA at the general meeting in May 1947, but delegates voted against his suggestion for a college or university all-star team to represent Canada at the Olympics instead of a senior team. The Montreal Royals were invited to represent Canada as the 1947 Allan Cup champions, but they did not accept due to commitments to the QSHL schedule.

In October 1947, the CAHA announced that the senior hockey team from the Royal Canadian Air Force (RCAF) base in Ottawa would represent Canada and satisfy the amateur requirements at the Olympics. The CAHA nominated Dawe and George Dudley to liaise with the Canadian Olympic Committee and gain approval for the choice of the Canadian national hockey team. After the Ottawa RCAF Flyers lost by a 7–0 score to the McGill University men's team, the Ottawa Citizen reported that multiple Canadian sports journalists called for a university team to represent Canada at the Olympics. When the RCAF team lost its next game by a 6–2 score to the Ottawa Canadian Army hockey team, Dawe held an emergency meeting and committed to retaining the team's management and coach, Frank Boucher. Dawe also announced that the RCAF team would be bolstered from the best available players, and retain the RCAF identity after six civilian players were added from the Ottawa Senior Hockey League. Dawe recruited defenceman Henri-André Laperrière from the Université de Montréal, in addition to two more players from Toronto recruited by George Dudley.

== Death and legacy ==
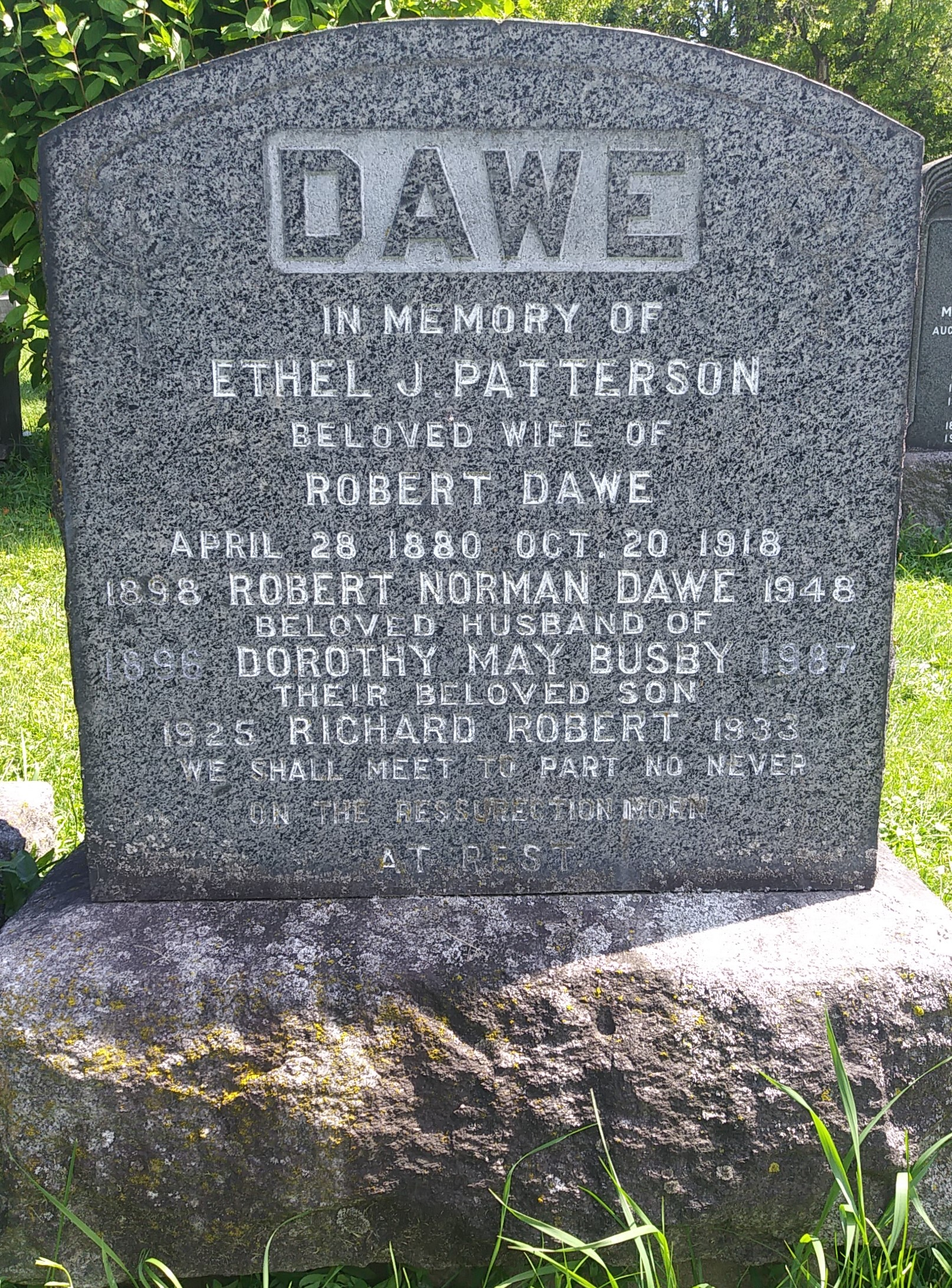
Dawe's grave site

Dawe died from a heart attack on January 4, 1948, at Royal Victoria Hospital, Montreal. He was interred in Mount Royal Cemetery. CAHA secretary-manager George Dudley stated, "We all had the highest regard for Mr. Dawe. He was a very sincere sportsman and a very hard worker, particularly for the cause of junior hockey". QAHA past-president Alcide Gagnon described Dawe as "a fine man and a victim of hockey because he worked too hard for it". Dawe remained active in hockey until his death, and his efforts to bolster the Ottawa RCAF Flyers resulted in the team winning every game at the Olympics and the gold medal.

The QAHA donated the Norman Dawe Memorial Trophy in the 1948–49 season, awarded for the provincial champion of the inaugural season in which Quebec had two junior A-level leagues. In the same season, management of the Montreal Forum donated the Norman Dawe Memorial Trophy which was awarded to the cleanest and most efficient player in the Junior Amateur Hockey Association. The trophy was later adopted by the Metropolitan Montreal Junior Hockey League and awarded annually to the most gentlemanly player. The Norman Dawe Memorial Sports Association was formed in 1948 to promote hockey and other youth sports in Verdun. He also became the namesake of the Dawe Memorial Rink in Verdun, and Parc Norman-Dawe on Woodland Road in Verdun.
