= Murray Dowey =

Canadian ice hockey player (1926–2021)

Personal information
- Full name: Murray Albert Dowey
- Born: January 3, 1926 Toronto, Ontario, Canada
- Died: May 26, 2021 (aged 95) Toronto, Ontario, Canada

Sport
- Sport: Ice hockey
Medal record
Men's ice hockey
Representing Canada
Gold medal – first place	1948 St. Moritz	Ice hockey

Murray Albert Dowey (January 3, 1926 – May 26, 2021), was a Canadian ice hockey goaltender. Nicknamed "Fast Hands", he was a member of the Ottawa RCAF Flyers, which won the gold medal in ice hockey representing Canada at the 1948 Winter Olympics in St. Moritz.

== Early life ==
Dowey was born in eastern Toronto. His father, Albert, was Irish Canadian; his mother, Winifred, was of English descent. Dowey served in the Canadian Army for two years, and played for Barkers Hockey Club of the Toronto Mercantile League. He was later presented with the opportunity to be the practice goaltender for the Toronto Maple Leafs, but did not sign after being unable to agree to terms with the owner of the Toronto Marlies (the Leafs' minor league affiliate). He worked as a clerk and typist for the Toronto Transit Commission (TTC) at the time he was recruited to the national hockey team for the 1948 Winter Olympics.

== 1948 Winter Olympics ==
The Canadian Amateur Hockey Association declined to send a team to the 1948 Olympics, in protest of the International Olympic Committee regulation that only amateur players could participate in the Games (thus ruling out those who received remuneration for playing hockey). However, Sandy Watson, a squadron leader and medical officer for the Royal Canadian Air Force (RCAF), decided to assemble a team nonetheless under the Ottawa RCAF Flyers banner. Dowey became the final player added to the Olympic roster. The original starting goalie, Dick Ball, failed a medical exam just two days before the team was to depart for the tournament. Two other players who made the team – Wally Halder and George Mara – had been teammates with Dowey in the Mercantile League. They consequently recommended Dowey to the Flyers officials.

Dowey recorded five shutouts in the eight games he played in, to go along with a 0.62 goals against average. Both numbers remained Olympic records at the time of his death. He conceded only one goal apiece against Sweden and Italy, with the three goals by the United States the most goals he allowed in one game during the tournament.

== Later life ==
After the Olympic Games and several exhibition games, Dowey went back to his job with the TTC. He retired from the TTC in 1986, having worked there for 44 years. He was honoured by the Canadian Forces in 2001 when it was announced that the 1948 RCAF Flyers were selected as Canada's greatest military athletes of the 20th century. He was selected as one of the torchbearers for the Toronto stretch of the 2010 Winter Olympics torch relay in December 2009. He was subsequently inducted into the Etobicoke Sports Hall of Fame the following year.

Dowey was interviewed in-depth for a documentary on the Flyers in 2015, as well as a book in the autumn of 2020, both called Against All Odds. He spent his final years at a retirement home in Etobicoke. Dowey died on May 26, 2021, in Toronto, Ontario. He was 95, and was the last surviving member of the Flyers' 1948 Olympic team.

== Career statistics ==
=== International ===
Bolded numbers indicate tournament leader

Year	Team	Event	GP	W	L	T	MIN	GA	SO	GAA
1948	Canada men's national ice hockey team	1948 Winter Olympics	8	7	0	1	478	**5**	**5**	**0.63**
