= Frank Boucher (ice hockey coach) =

Canadian soldier and ice hockey coach

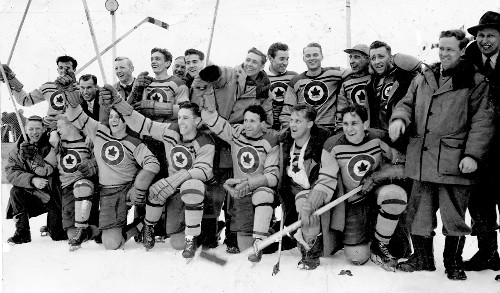
The Ottawa RCAF Flyers at the 1948 Winter Olympics.

Sgt. Frank Boucher (c. 1917 – December 4, 2003) was a Canadian ice hockey coach and Royal Canadian Air Force (RCAF) non-commissioned officer. He served as the head coach of the Ottawa RCAF Flyers which represented the Canadian national hockey team in ice hockey at the 1948 Winter Olympics. Despite two lopsided losses in exhibition games before the Olympics, Canadian Amateur Hockey Association vice-president Norman Dawe held an emergency meeting and retained Boucher as coach, and agreed to bolster the team from the best available players. The Flyers went on the win the gold medal for Canada. The 1948 team was honoured by the Canadian Forces in 2001, when selected as Canada's greatest military athletes of the 20th century.

Sgt. Boucher was the son of Georges Boucher and a nephew of Frank Boucher, both who are members of the Hockey Hall of Fame. Boucher died on December 4, 2003, of pneumonia in Osgoode, Ontario. He was posthumously inducted into the Lisgar Collegiate Institute Athletic Wall of Fame in 2018.
