= Ottawa RCAF Flyers =

Defunct Canadian amateur ice hockey team

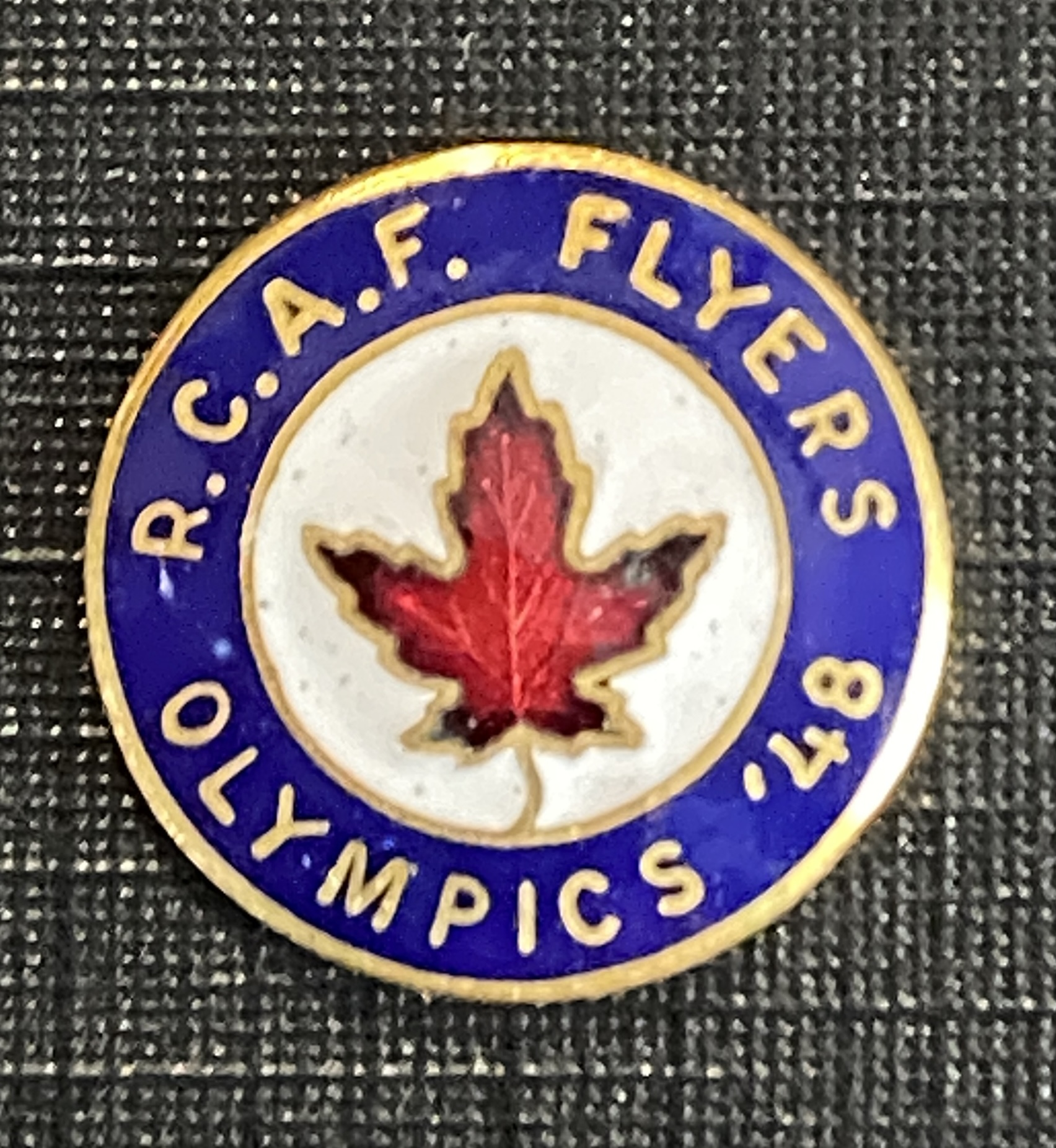
- RCAF lapel pin
- Sport: Ice hockey
- Location: Ottawa, Ontario, Canada
- Affiliation(s): Royal Canadian Air Force
- Championships: 1

Olympic medal record

Men's ice hockey

Representing Canada
Gold medal – first place	1948 St. Moritz	Team competition

The Ottawa RCAF Flyers were a Canadian senior ice hockey team from the Royal Canadian Air Force (RCAF) base in Ottawa. The team was made up of active and former RCAF members and Canadian Army personnel. The team won the gold medal in the 1948 Winter Olympics and the 1942 Allan Cup championship. The team was inducted into the Canadian Armed Forces Sports Hall of Fame in 1971. In 2001, the 1948 team was honoured by the Canadian Forces when it was selected as Canada's greatest military athletes of the 20th century.

== 1948 Winter Olympics ==
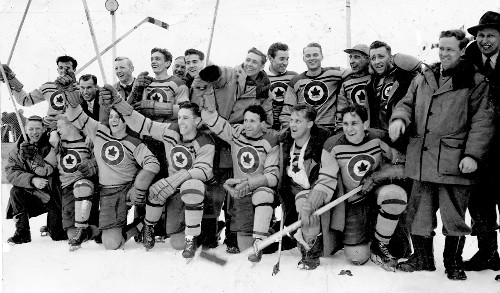
Ottawa RCAF Flyers at the 1948 Winter Olympics

In October 1947, the Canadian Amateur Hockey Association (CAHA) announced that the senior ice hockey team from the Royal Canadian Air Force (RCAF) base in Ottawa would represent the Canadian national team in ice hockey at the 1948 Winter Olympics. At the time, the CAHA had ongoing disagreements with the Ligue Internationale de Hockey sur Glace and the International Olympic Committee on the definition of an amateur, and the RCAF team was a compromise to meet the amateur eligibility requirements of the Olympics. CAHA vice-president Norman Dawe and secretary George Dudley, liaised with the Canadian Olympic Committee and gain approval for the choice.

After the Ottawa RCAF Flyers lost by a 7–0 score to the McGill University men's team, the Ottawa Citizen reported that multiple Canadian sports journalists called for a university team to represent Canada at the Olympics. When the RCAF team lost its next game by a 6–2 score to the Ottawa Canadian Army hockey team, Norman Dawe held an emergency meeting and committed to retaining the team's management and coach, Frank Boucher. Dawe also announced that the RCAF team would be bolstered from the best available players, and retain the RCAF identity after six civilian players were added from the Ottawa Senior Hockey League. Dawe recruited defenceman Henri-André Laperrière from the Université de Montréal, in addition to two more players from Toronto recruited by George Dudley. The efforts to bolster the Ottawa RCAF Flyers resulted in the team winning every game at the Olympics and the gold medal.

=== Team members ===
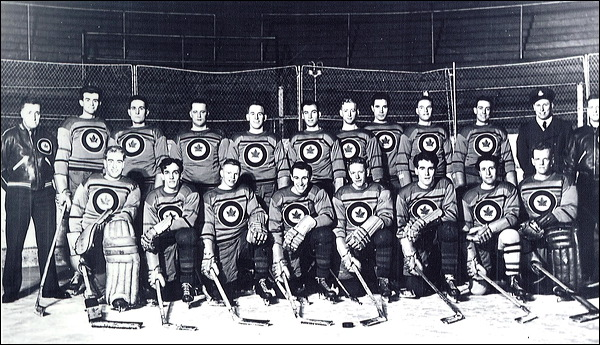
1948 Ottawa RCAF Flyers

Players

The IOC lists that all players, including reserves, were given an Olympic Gold Medal.

- Hubert Brooks, Portage la Prairie, Manitoba (reserve)
- Murray Dowey, Toronto (goaltender)
- Frank Dunster, Montreal (defenceman)
- Roy Forbes, Vancouver (defenceman) (reserve)
- Andy Gilpin, Montreal (forward) (reserve)
- Jean Gravelle, Aylmer, Quebec
- Patsy Guzzo, Ottawa
- Wally Halder, Toronto
- Ted Hibberd, Ottawa
- Ross King, Portage la Prairie (goaltender) (reserve)
- Henri-André Laperrière, Ottawa (defenceman)
- John Lecompte, Ottawa, (defenceman)
- Pete Leichnitz (reserve), Brechin, Ontario
- George Mara, Toronto
- Albert Renaud, Ottawa
- Reginald Schroeter, Ottawa
- Irving Taylor, Ottawa

Staff

- Coach, Sgt. Frank Boucher, Ottawa, (nephew of Frank Boucher)
- Manager, S/L Sandy Watson, Ottawa
- Trainer, Cpl George McFaul, Ottawa

== Legacy ==
The book Gold Medal Misfits (Pat MacAdam, Manor House Publishing, 2008) chronicles the team's history with original articles from the area and interviews with surviving team members.

Murray Dowey was the last surviving member of the Flyers' 1948 Olympic team, dying in 2021.

The Winnipeg Jets' 2023–24 alternate uniform, commemorating the centennial of the RCAF, was based on those worn by the RCAF Flyers at the 1948 Olympics.

== See also ==
- Ice hockey in Ottawa
- List of Canadian national ice hockey team rosters

== Bibliography ==
- List of 1948 Canadian Olympic Medal Winners
- GreatestHockeyLegends.com
- McLauchlin, Les. "Good God, Olympic Gold!", The Airforce, Spring, 1998. Retrieved April 21, 2008
- Iorfida, Chris. "Canada's quiet hockey heroes", CBC.ca, February 7, 2008.
- The Life and Times of Hubert Brooks M.C. C.D. A Canadian Hero "R.C.A.F. Flyers at 1948 Olympics"
- Royal Canadian Air Force: RCAF Flyers Wrote Olympic History Retrieved February 8, 2015

Preceded by Port Arthur Bearcats	Canada men's Olympic ice hockey team 1948	Succeeded by Edmonton Mercurys
