= Henri-André Laperrière =

Canadian ice hockey player (1925–2015)

André Laperrière
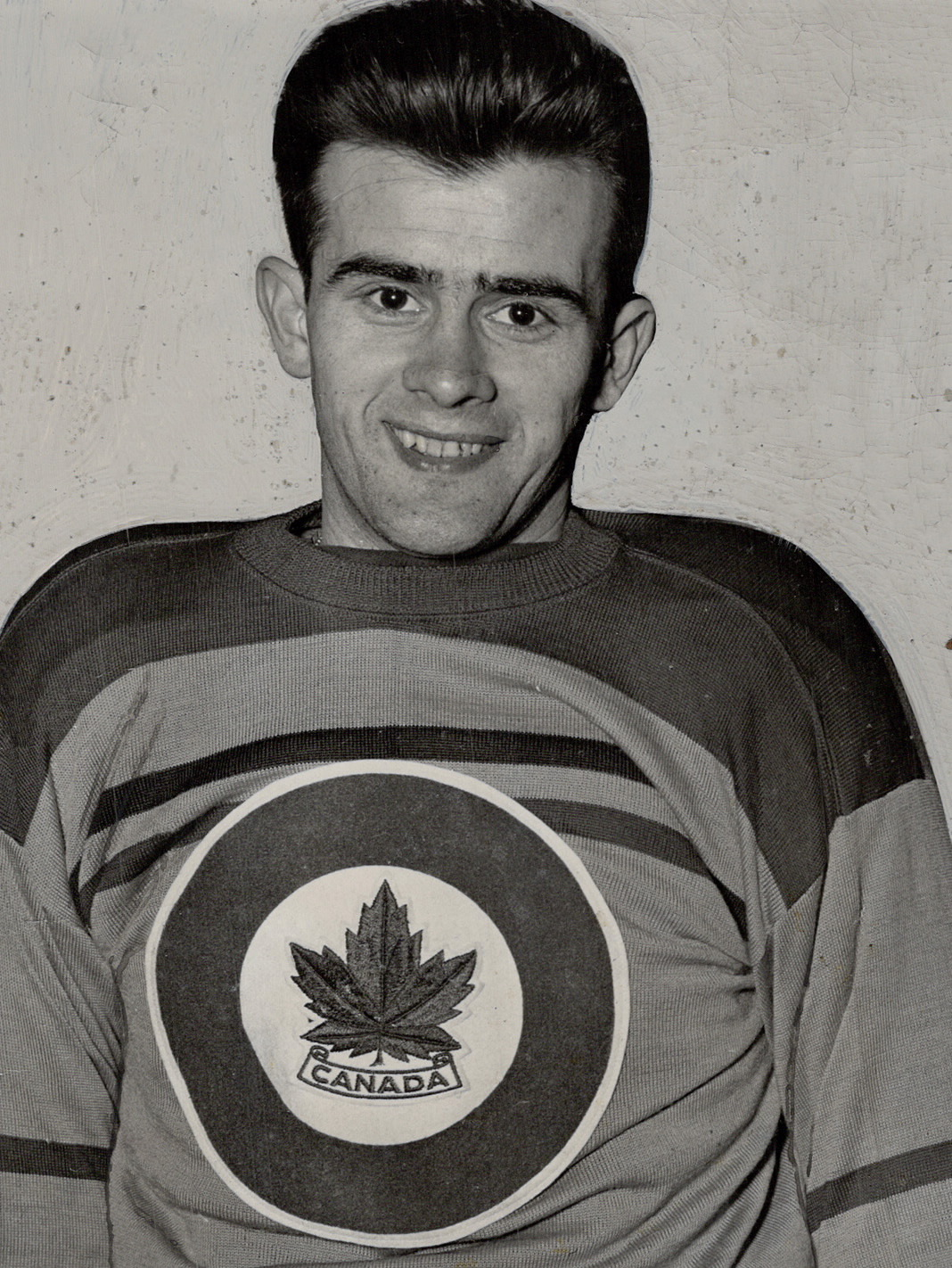
- Laperrière in 1948

Personal information
- Born: June 12, 1925 Montreal, Quebec, Canada
- Died: March 8, 2015 (aged 89) Montreal, Quebec, Canada
- Height: 6 ft 2 in (188 cm)
- Weight: 174 lb (79 kg)

Sport
- Country: Canada
- Sport: Ice hockey
- Club: Verdun Terriers (1944–1945); Montreal Carabins (1945–1950); Ottawa RCAF Flyers (1948)
- Retired: 1950
Medal record
Representing Canada
Gold medal – first place	1948 St. Moritz	Ice hockey

Henri-André Laperrière (June 12, 1925 – March 8, 2015) was a Canadian ice hockey defenceman. He was a member of the Ottawa RCAF Flyers team that won the gold medal in ice hockey at the 1948 Winter Olympics. As a member of the RCAF Flyers, Laperrière was inducted into the Canadian Forces Sports Hall of Fame in 1971, and into the Canadian Olympic Hall of Fame in 2008.

== Playing career ==
Henri-André Laperrière was born in Montreal on June 12, 1925, the son of a local streetcar operator. Laperrière played junior ice hockey for the Verdun Terriers in the 1944–45 season. He played for the Montreal Carabins men's ice hockey team while attending the Université de Montréal from 1945 to 1950.

In advance of ice hockey at the 1948 Winter Olympics, he was recruited by Canadian Amateur Hockey Association vice-president Norman Dawe, to play for the Ottawa RCAF Flyers team which represented Canada. Laperrière was instated as a private in the Royal Canadian Air Force. He played in eight matches and scored one goal at the Olympics. During the final eight seconds of the last game against Sweden, he replaced the goaltender Murray Dowey who received a penalty. The RCAF Flyers won the game by a 3–1 score, and won the Olympic gold medal in ice hockey.

After the Olympics, Laperrière declined an offer from the New York Rangers to play professionally. He remained in university and won Canadian Interuniversity Athletic Union hockey championships in 1949 and 1950.

== Later life and honours ==
Laperrière retired from playing hockey in 1950. He later worked as a graphic designer, served as member of the city council for Outremont from 1970 to 1982, and was a president of the Outremont Hockey Association for five years.

As a member of the 1948 Ottawa RCAF Flyers, Laperrière was inducted into the Canadian Forces Sports Hall of Fame in 1971, and into the Canadian Olympic Hall of Fame in 2008. In 2001, the Canadian Forces selected the 1948 Ottawa RCAF Flyers team as Canada's greatest military athletes of the 20th century.

Laperrière died in Montreal on March 8, 2015.
