= Reginald Schroeter =

Canadian ice hockey player

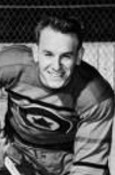
- Reginald Schroeter 1948 RCAF Flyers
- Born: September 11, 1921 Ottawa, Ontario, Canada
- Died: July 30, 2002 (aged 80)
- Weight: 160 lb (73 kg; 11 st 6 lb)
- Position: Left wing
- Shot: Left
- Played for: Ottawa RCAF Flyers
- National team: Canada
- Playing career: 1939–1949

Olympic medal record

Men's ice hockey

Representing Canada
Gold medal – first place	1948 St. Moritz	Ice hockey

Reginald John "Reg" Schroeter, sometimes referred to as Reginald Schroter, (September 11, 1921 – July 30, 2002) was a Canadian ice hockey player. He was a member of the Ottawa RCAF Flyers who won the gold medal in ice hockey for Canada at the 1948 Winter Olympics in St. Moritz.

In 2001 Reg Schroeter was honoured by the Canadian Forces when it was announced that the 1948 RCAF Flyers were selected as Canada's greatest military athletes of the 20th century.
