= Irving Taylor (ice hockey) =

Canadian ice hockey player

Personal information
- Born: Irving Carrie Taylor; August 13, 1919 Ottawa, Ontario, Canada
- Died: December 4, 1991 (aged 72) Ottawa, Ontario, Canada

Sport
- Sport: Ice hockey
- Team: Ottawa RCAF Flyers
Medal record
Men's ice hockey
Representing Canada
Gold medal – first place	1948 St. Moritz	Ice hockey

Irving Carrie Taylor (August 13, 1919 – December 4, 1991) was a Canadian ice hockey player. He was a member of the Ottawa RCAF Flyers who won the gold medal in ice hockey for Canada at the 1948 Winter Olympics in St. Moritz. Taylor died after complications due to stomach cancer at his home in Ottawa, Ontario, Canada.
