= 1942 Allan Cup =

Canadian senior ice hockey championship

The Allan Cup was the championship trophy for senior hockey overseen by the CAHA.

The 1942 Allan Cup was the senior ice hockey championship of the Canadian Amateur Hockey Association for the 1941–42 season. The Ottawa RCAF Flyers defeated the Port Arthur Bearcats by three games to two to win the Allan Cup.

== National playoffs ==
Quebec Amateur Hockey Association (QAHA) president Norman Dawe sought for teams from Eastern Canada to have more home games during the Allan Cup playoffs. At the Canadian Amateur Hockey Association (CAHA) general meeting in April 1941, his motion was approved to allow the eastern and western portions of the national playoffs to be handled by the respective CAHA branches. Despite the approval, the CAHA had expressed concerns about the low gate receipts at the Montreal Forum, compared to expected profits elsewhere, and reserved the right to change the location of the games.

The Quebec Senior Hockey League (QSHL) proposed forming an Eastern Canada Hockey Association in May 1941, which Dawe supported for the sake of the Allan Cup playoffs. Under the proposal, the QAHA, the Ottawa and District Amateur Hockey Association, and the Maritime Amateur Hockey Association, would work together in the playoffs to determine one team to play against the Ontario champion; and share the profits from the gate receipts among themselves before the CAHA took its share. QSHL president George Slater felt that any team which reached the Allan Cup finals would face bankruptcy without a better financial deal, since the CAHA kept all profits from gate receipts in inter-branch playoffs. Dawe stated that the proposal may seem like mutiny, but that the QAHA wanted to form a new association within the CAHA, and voice Eastern Canada's concerns.

The QAHA wanted the winners of the QSHL and the Eastern Townships League to play a series for the provincial senior championship. Dawe stated that the QAHA would be unable to meet the March 25 deadline set by the CAHA without an extension until March 31, and noted that it was the first instance in which the QAHA had made such a request. The CAHA denied the extension and the QSHL final was shortened to a two-game total-goals series. Had the change not been made, it would have been the first time that Quebec did not participate in the Allan Cup playoffs.

== Final ==
Best of five final series:

- Ottawa 7 Port Arthur 4
- Ottawa 8 Port Arthur 7
- Port Arthur 3 Ottawa 1
- Port Arthur 4 Ottawa 3
- Ottawa 7 Port Arthur 1

The Ottawa RCAF Flyers defeated the Port Arthur Bearcats by three games to two to win the Allan Cup.
