= Patsy Guzzo =

Canadian ice hockey player

- Born: October 14, 1914 Ottawa, Ontario, Canada
- Died: January 16, 1993 (aged 78) Ottawa, Ontario, Canada
- Height: 5 ft 6 in (168 cm)
- Weight: 160 lb (73 kg; 11 st 6 lb)
- Position: Left wing
- Shot: Left
- Played for: Ottawa RCAF Flyers
- National team: Canada
- Playing career: 1935–1954
Medal record
Men's ice hockey
Representing Canada
Gold medal – first place	1948 St. Moritz	Ice hockey

Patrick Joseph Guzzo (October 14, 1914 – January 16, 1993) was a Canadian ice hockey player. He was a member of the Ottawa RCAF Flyers who won the gold medal in ice hockey for Canada at the 1948 Winter Olympics in St. Moritz.
