= Wally Halder =

Canadian ice hockey player

Personal information
- Full name: Wallace Edwin Halder
- Born: September 15, 1925 Toronto, Ontario, Canada
- Died: October 27, 1994 (aged 69) Toronto, Ontario, Canada
- Height: 6 ft 0 in (183 cm)
- Weight: 185 lb (84 kg)

Sport
- Country: Canada
- Sport: Ice hockey
Medal record
Men's ice hockey
Representing Canada
Gold medal – first place	1948 St. Moritz	Ice hockey

Wallace Edwin Halder (September 15, 1925 – October 27, 1994) was a Canadian ice hockey player. He was a member of the Ottawa RCAF Flyers who won the gold medal in ice hockey for Canada at the 1948 Winter Olympics in St. Moritz. He was the top scorer of the Canadian team, as well as the top scorer of the entire tournament.
