= George Mara =

Ice hockey player

Personal information
- Full name: George Edward Mara
- Born: December 12, 1921 Toronto, Ontario, Canada
- Died: August 30, 2006 (aged 84) Cleveland, Ohio, U.S.

Sport
- Sport: Ice hockey
Medal record
Men's ice hockey
Representing Canada
Olympic Games
Gold medal – first place	1948 St. Moritz	Team

George Edward Mara, CM (December 12, 1921 – August 30, 2006) was a Canadian businessman and Olympian hockey player. He was a member of the Ottawa RCAF Flyers who won the gold medal in ice hockey for Canada at the 1948 Winter Olympics in St. Moritz.

== Background ==
Born in Toronto, Ontario, he was educated at Upper Canada College and played for the Toronto Marlboros junior hockey team. After declining an offer from the Detroit Red Wings during World War II, he instead served as a Lieutenant in the Royal Canadian Navy. After the war, he played for the Royal Canadian Air Force Flyers in the 1948 Winter Olympics and was captain of the gold medal team.

He also joined the family business, William Mara Company, an importer of wines and spirits. He sold the company in the early 1970s and joined Jannock Corporation where he was vice-chairman.

He was one of the founders and chairman of the Olympic Trust of Canada, the fundraising arm of the Canadian Olympic Association (now the Canadian Olympic Committee), which raised millions of dollars to help support Canadian athletes.

From 1957 to 1969, he was a director of Maple Leaf Gardens and briefly became President in 1969.

He died in 2006 while undergoing heart surgery.

== Honours ==
- In 1976, he was made a Member of the Order of Canada "for his tireless efforts in raising funds to support Canadian Olympic athletes competing in Munich and Montreal." *In 1993, he was inducted into Canada's Sports Hall of Fame.
- In 2001 George Mara was honoured by the Canadian Forces when it was announced that the 1948 RCAF Flyers were selected as Canada’s greatest military athletes of the 20th century.

== Sources ==
- Ian Urquhart. "George Mara, 84: Captained Canada to hockey gold". The Star. Toronto. Archived from the original on September 29, 2007.
- "Canada's Sports Hall of Fame citation". cshof.ca.
- "Canadian Olympic Committee Recognizes Contributions of George Mara". cnw.ca. CNW Telbec. September 6, 2006. Archived from the original on September 29, 2007.
