= Ice hockey at the 1948 Winter Olympics =

Tournament details
- Host country: Switzerland
- Venue(s): St. Moritz Olympic Ice Rink, Suvretta, Kulm (in 1 host city)
- Dates: 30 January – 8 February 1948
- Teams: 9

Final positions
- Champions: Canada (5th title)
- Runners-up: Czechoslovakia
- Third place: Switzerland
- Fourth place: Sweden

Tournament statistics
- Games played: 36
- Goals scored: 482 (13.39 per game)
- Scoring leader(s): (Canada) Walter Halder (29 points)

The men's ice hockey tournament at the 1948 Winter Olympics in St. Moritz, Switzerland, was the sixth Olympic Championship, also served as the 15th World Championships and the 26th European Championships. Canada won its fifth Olympic gold medal and 12th World Championship, represented by the Ottawa RCAF Flyers team of Canadian Armed Forces personnel. The highest-finishing European team Czechoslovakia, won the silver medal and its eighth European Championship. Bibi Torriani played for Switzerland which won the bronze medal, and became the first ice hockey player to recite the Olympic Oath on behalf of all athletes.

The hockey tournament was in jeopardy of not being played due to disagreements between the Ligue Internationale de Hockey sur Glace and the International Olympic Committee, and a threatened boycott by the United States Olympic Committee when two American hockey teams showed up to play. Writer Jack Sullivan referred to the 1948 Winter Olympics as "the most controversial, name-calling, complaint-filled, Winter Olympic Games ever held".

== Changes in world hockey since 1936 ==
After the 1936 Winter Olympics, the Canadian Amateur Hockey Association (CAHA) revised its definition of amateur when it failed to win the gold medal in hockey, and broke away from the Amateur Athletic Union of Canada despite the possibility that its players may no longer be eligible for Olympic hockey. In August 1937, Eastern Amateur Hockey League president Tommy Lockhart broke away from the Amateur Athletic Union of the United States over disagreements on Canadian-born players in his league, then reached a co-operative agreement directly with the CAHA. He then founded the Amateur Hockey Association of the United States (AHAUS) as a rival governing body of ice hockey.

The CAHA and the AHAUS joined to form the International Ice Hockey Association in 1940. Former CAHA president W. G. Hardy was elected its president, and sought for acceptance by the International Olympic Committee (IOC) on terms acceptable to the CAHA. CAHA president George Dudley subsequently threatened to withdraw Canada from the Olympics over the definition of amateur. An IOC decision on the matter was postponed when the 1940 Winter Olympics and 1944 Winter Olympics were cancelled due to World War II.

In 1946, the Ligue Internationale de Hockey sur Glace (LIHG) held its first congress since 1939. The LIHG expelled Germany and Japan, and memberships of Lithuania, Latvia, and Estonia were consolidated into the Soviet Union. Austria was readmitted to the LIHG, and Denmark was welcomed as a new member. Paul Loicq stepped down as after 25 years as LIHG president, and was succeeded by Fritz Kraatz in 1947. The LIHG also agreed to a merger with the International Ice Hockey Association, and recognized AHAUS as the governing body of hockey in the United States instead of the AAU.

== Choice of the Canadian team ==
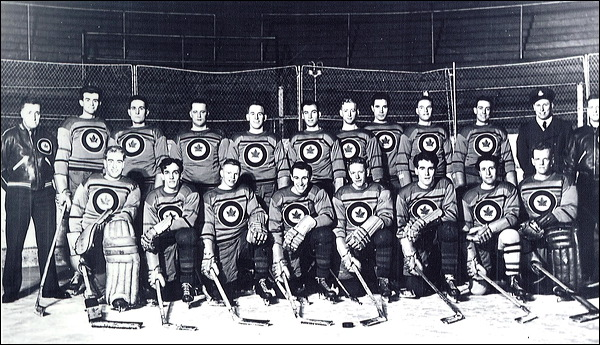
1948 Ottawa RCAF Flyers

Canada did not participate in the 1947 Ice Hockey World Championships and the CAHA had decided not to participate in the 1948 Winter Olympics in disagreement with the definition of amateur by the IOC. CAHA president Al Pickard felt Canada was obliged to send a Canada men's national ice hockey team truly representative of the "greatest hockey country" in the world, and honestly take the Olympic Oath as amateurs. He stated that Canada would have been misunderstood, "if we had refused to participate because we did not get our own way". The Canadian Olympic Association indicated it would accept any team nominated by the CAHA which met amateur eligibility. Pickard announced the Ottawa RCAF Flyers were chosen to represent the country and appeal to patriotic support for the Royal Canadian Air Force, but still continued to press for international recognition of the CAHA's definition of amateur. He also confirmed that the CAHA would pay the national team's expenses for the Olympics, and provide support to use the best Canadian players available.

== Rival American organizations ==
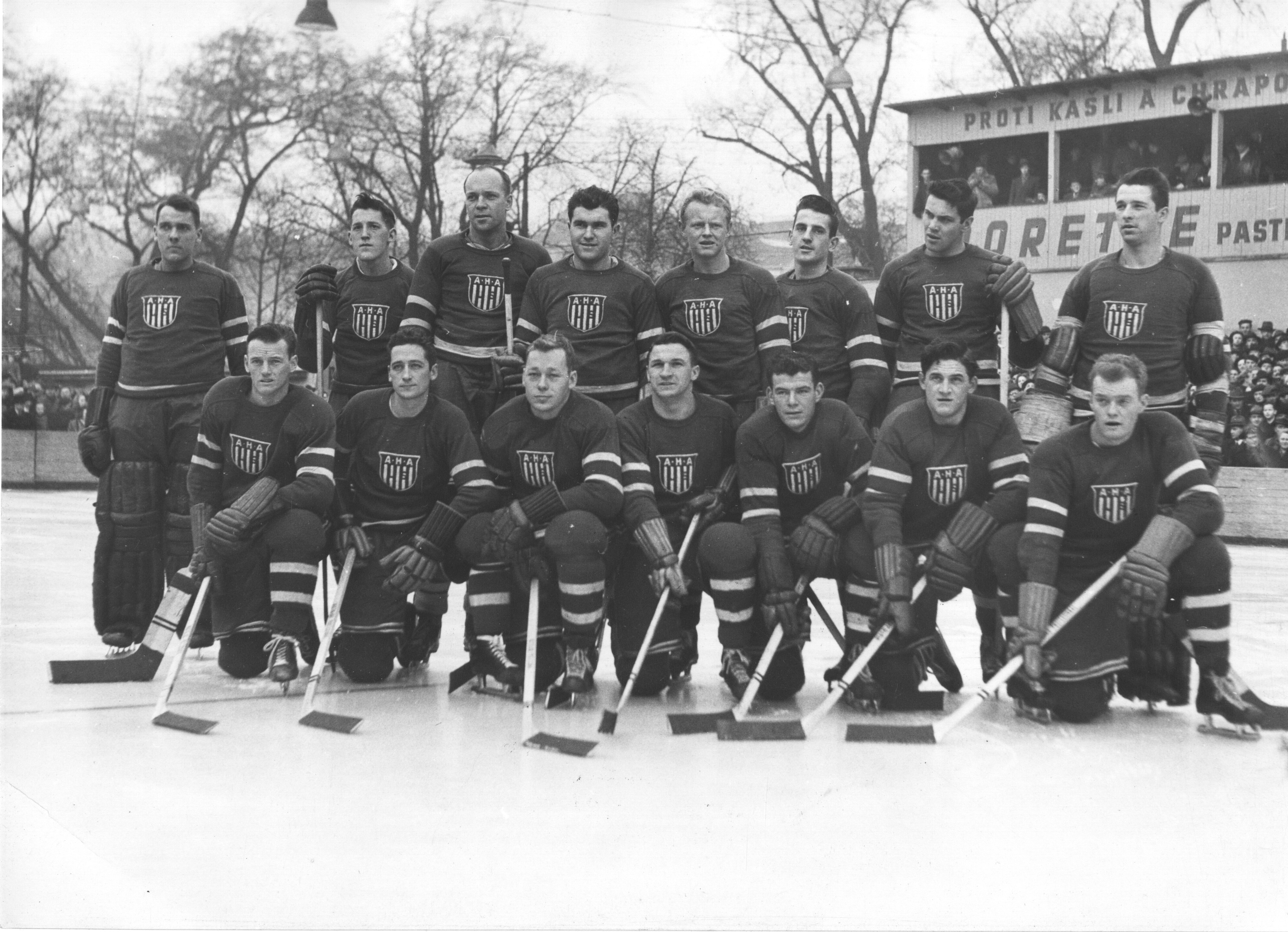
U.S. Olympic Hockey Team

The LIHG met in September 1947 to decide on whether to have an ice hockey tournament at the Winter Olympics, or host a separate Ice Hockey World Championships elsewhere in Switzerland in 1948. Prior to the meeting, Avery Brundage of the United States Olympic Committee (USOC) reportedly campaigned to delegates to vote against inclusion of the AHAUS in the upcoming Olympics. George Dudley and Bunny Ahearne felt that the Swiss Olympic organizing committee would agree to either definition of amateur as long as hockey would be included, since it would be the most profitable event at the Olympics. The LIHG passed a resolution that its teams would only play against teams approved by the CAHA and the AHAUS, which was accepted by the Swiss Olympic organizing committee.

In November 1947, Ahearne reported that the AAU still planned on sending a team to the Olympics. Brundage threatened that the USOC would boycott the Olympics if the AHAUS team was recognized. The LIHG met again in December regarding United States participation in the Olympics. Ahearne suggested organizing Ice Hockey World Championships in Zürich and Basel instead of during the Olympics. He felt the Brundage threat was a bluff and an attempt to sabotage Olympic ice hockey. Ahearne reiterated that LIHG teams would not play against an AAU representative.

The idea of hosting a separate Ice Hockey World Championships surfaced again in January, and Ahearne stated that such a tournament could be arranged on 48 hours' notice. The Swiss Olympic organizing committee insisted on the AHAUS team being recognized, despite persistent charges by Brundage that the AHAUS team was "tainted with professionalism". Brundage and the AAU supported a National Collegiate Athletic Association team instead. After bitter negotiations which were not resolved until the night before the Olympics, the AHAUS team was allowed to play in the tournament, but the IOC declared those games would not count in the standings. The winner of the hockey tournament would be recognized as an Olympic champion, except for the United States team.

== Participating nations ==
- Austria (15)
- Canada (12)
- Czechoslovakia (17)
- Great Britain (14)
- Italy (17)
- Poland (17)
- Switzerland (17)
- Sweden (16)
- United States (14)

== Final tournament ==
The tournament was run in a round-robin format with nine teams participating. The Canadians had seven wins and one tie against the team from Czechoslovakia. Czechoslovakia also won seven games. The tournament was decided on goal average. Canada outscored their opponents 69:5 (a 13.8 goal average). The Czechoslovakia team outscored their opponents 80:18 (a 4.44 goal average). On the final day the Swiss watched the Czechoslovaks beat the Americans dashing their gold medal aspirations, and then lost their opportunity for silver in a loss to Canada, finishing with a bronze.

Because this tournament was also the LIHG World Championship, the United States earned a fourth-place ranking in the LIHG standings. George Dudley stated that the 1948 Olympic hockey tournament was played in "ridiculous weather conditions" with poor refereeing.

Medal	Team
Gold	Canada
Silver	Czechoslovakia
Bronze	Switzerland

Team	Pld	W	L	D	GF	GA	GD	Pts
Canada	8	7	0	1	69	5	+64	15
Czechoslovakia	8	7	0	1	80	18	+62	15
Switzerland	8	6	2	0	67	21	+46	12
Sweden	8	4	4	0	55	28	+27	8
Great Britain	8	3	5	0	39	47	−8	6
Poland	8	2	6	0	29	97	−68	4
Austria	8	1	7	0	33	77	−44	2
Italy	8	0	8	0	24	156	−132	0
United States (Note: United States team was not eligible for a final ranking. Only eight teams are officially ranked.)	8	5	3	0	86	33	+53	10

Source: HockeyCanada.ca

== Results ==
30 January 1948	Switzerland	5-4	United States	St. Moritz Olympic Ice Rink, St. Moritz, Switzerland

30 January 1948	Canada	3-1	Sweden	St. Moritz Olympic Ice Rink, St. Moritz, Switzerland

30 January 1948	Poland	7-5	Austria	St. Moritz Olympic Ice Rink, St. Moritz, Switzerland

30 January 1948	Czechoslovakia	22-3	Italy	St. Moritz Olympic Ice Rink, St. Moritz, Switzerland

31 January 1948	United States	23-4	Poland	St. Moritz Olympic Ice Rink, St. Moritz, Switzerland

31 January 1948	Czechoslovakia	6-3	Sweden	St. Moritz Olympic Ice Rink, St. Moritz, Switzerland

31 January 1948	Switzerland	16-0	Italy	St. Moritz Olympic Ice Rink, St. Moritz, Switzerland

31 January 1948	Great Britain	5-4	Austria	St. Moritz Olympic Ice Rink, St. Moritz, Switzerland

1 February 1948	Canada	3-0	Great Britain	St. Moritz Olympic Ice Rink, St. Moritz, Switzerland

1 February 1948	United States	31-1	Italy	St. Moritz Olympic Ice Rink, St. Moritz, Switzerland

1 February 1948	Switzerland	11-2	Austria	St. Moritz Olympic Ice Rink, St. Moritz, Switzerland

1 February 1948	Czechoslovakia	13-1	Poland	St. Moritz Olympic Ice Rink, St. Moritz, Switzerland

2 February 1948	Sweden	7-1	Austria	St. Moritz Olympic Ice Rink, St. Moritz, Switzerland

2 February 1948	Canada	15-0	Poland	St. Moritz Olympic Ice Rink, St. Moritz, Switzerland

2 February 1948	Czechoslovakia	11-4	Great Britain	St. Moritz Olympic Ice Rink, St. Moritz, Switzerland

3 February 1948	Canada	21-1	Italy	St. Moritz Olympic Ice Rink, St. Moritz, Switzerland

3 February 1948	United States	5-2	Sweden	St. Moritz Olympic Ice Rink, St. Moritz, Switzerland

4 February 1948	Czechoslovakia	17-3	Austria	St. Moritz Olympic Ice Rink, St. Moritz, Switzerland

4 February 1948	Poland	13-7	Italy	St. Moritz Olympic Ice Rink, St. Moritz, Switzerland

4 February 1948	Switzerland	12-3	Great Britain	St. Moritz Olympic Ice Rink, St. Moritz, Switzerland

5 February 1948	Austria	16-5	Italy	St. Moritz Olympic Ice Rink, St. Moritz, Switzerland

5 February 1948	Great Britain	7-2	Poland	St. Moritz Olympic Ice Rink, St. Moritz, Switzerland

5 February 1948	Switzerland	8-2	Sweden	St. Moritz Olympic Ice Rink, St. Moritz, Switzerland

5 February 1948	Canada	12-3	United States	St. Moritz Olympic Ice Rink, St. Moritz, Switzerland

6 February 1948	Switzerland	14-0	Poland	St. Moritz Olympic Ice Rink, St. Moritz, Switzerland

6 February 1948	Canada	0-0	Czechoslovakia	St. Moritz Olympic Ice Rink, St. Moritz, Switzerland

6 February 1948	Sweden	4-3	Great Britain	St. Moritz Olympic Ice Rink, St. Moritz, Switzerland

6 February 1948	United States	13-2	Austria	St. Moritz Olympic Ice Rink, St. Moritz, Switzerland

7 February 1948	United States	4-3	Great Britain	St. Moritz Olympic Ice Rink, St. Moritz, Switzerland

7 February 1948	Czechoslovakia	7-1	Switzerland	St. Moritz Olympic Ice Rink, St. Moritz, Switzerland

7 February 1948	Canada	12-0	Austria	St. Moritz Olympic Ice Rink, St. Moritz, Switzerland

7 February 1948	Sweden	23-0	Italy	St. Moritz Olympic Ice Rink, St. Moritz, Switzerland

8 February 1948	Great Britain	14-7	Italy	St. Moritz Olympic Ice Rink, St. Moritz, Switzerland

8 February 1948	Czechoslovakia	4-3	United States	St. Moritz Olympic Ice Rink, St. Moritz, Switzerland

8 February 1948	Canada	3-0	Switzerland	St. Moritz Olympic Ice Rink, St. Moritz, Switzerland

8 February 1948	Sweden	13-2	Poland	St. Moritz Olympic Ice Rink, St. Moritz, Switzerland

== Statistics ==
=== Average age ===
Team Poland was the oldest team in the tournament, averaging 29 years and 10 months. Team USA was the youngest team in the tournament, averaging 23 years and 1 months. Gold medalists Canada averaged 25 years and 8 months. Tournament average was 27 years and 2 months.

=== Top scorer ===
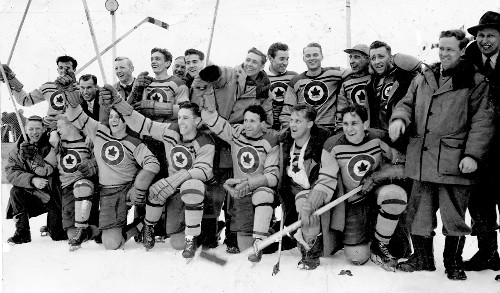
The Ottawa RCAF Flyers, who represented Canada and won the gold medal.

Team	GP	G	A	Pts
(Canada) Walter Halder	8	21	8	29

== Team Canada roster ==
RCAF Flyers

Country	Members
CAN	Murray Dowey, Frank Dunster, Andre Laperriere, Louis Lecompte, Jean Gravelle, Patrick Guzzo, Walter Halder, Ted Hibberd, George Mara, Ab Renaud, Reg Schroeter, Irving Taylor; Coach: Frank Boucher

== European Championship medal table ==
1st place, gold medalist(s)	Czechoslovakia
2nd place, silver medalist(s)	Switzerland
3rd place, bronze medalist(s)	Sweden
4	Great Britain
5	Poland
6	Austria
7	Italy

== Sources ==
- Findling, John E.; Pelle, Kimberly D. (2004), Encyclopedia of the Modern Olympic Movement, Westport CT.: Greenwood Press, ISBN 0-313-32278-3
- Naworynski, P.J. (2017), Against All Odds: The Untold Story of Canada's Unlikely Hockey Heroes, Toronto: Collins, ISBN 978-1-44345-090-4
- Jeux Olympiques de Saint-Moritz 1948
- Ishockey VM OS 1947–1954
