= St. Moritz Olympic Ice Rink =

Ice skating rink in St. Moritz, Switzerland

Coordinates: 46.5014°N 9.8497°E

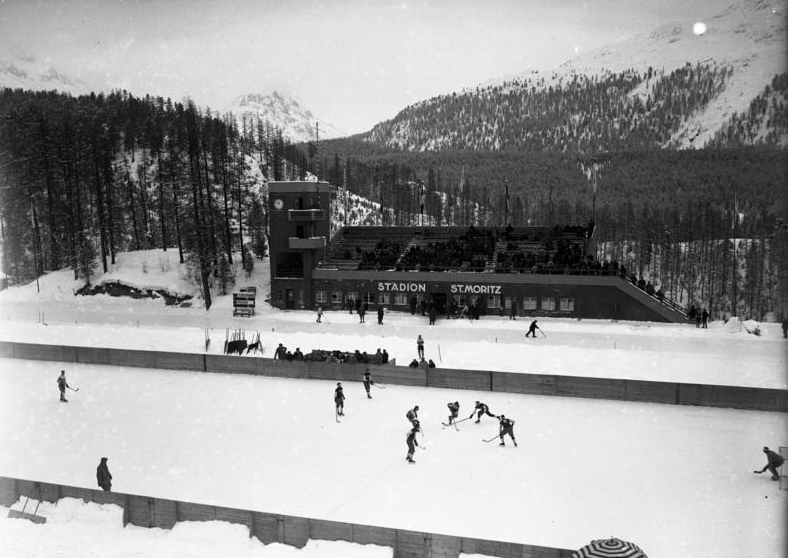
The stadium in 1928

St. Moritz Olympic Ice Rink (German: Eisstadion Badrutts Park) is an outdoor stadium in St. Moritz, Switzerland. It was the venue for the ice hockey, speedskating and figure skating events, as well as the location of the opening and closing ceremonies at the 1928 Winter Olympics and 1948 Winter Olympics.

Artist and designer Rolf Sachs now owns the stadium's former land, and the building containing the changing facilities for athletes and officials and observation facility serves as his personal home.
