= Canada at the 1948 Winter Olympics =

- IOC code: CAN
- NOC: Canadian Olympic Committee
- Website: www.olympic.ca (in English and French)

in St. Moritz, Switzerland January 30–February 8, 1948
- Competitors: 28 (24 men, 4 women) in 7 sports
- Flag bearer: Hubert Brooks (ice hockey)
- Medals Ranked 6th: Gold 2 Silver 0 Bronze 1 Total 3

Winter Olympics appearances (overview)
- 1924; 1928; 1932; 1936; 1948; 1952; 1956; 1960; 1964; 1968; 1972; 1976; 1980; 1984; 1988; 1992; 1994; 1998; 2002; 2006; 2010; 2014; 2018; 2022; 2026

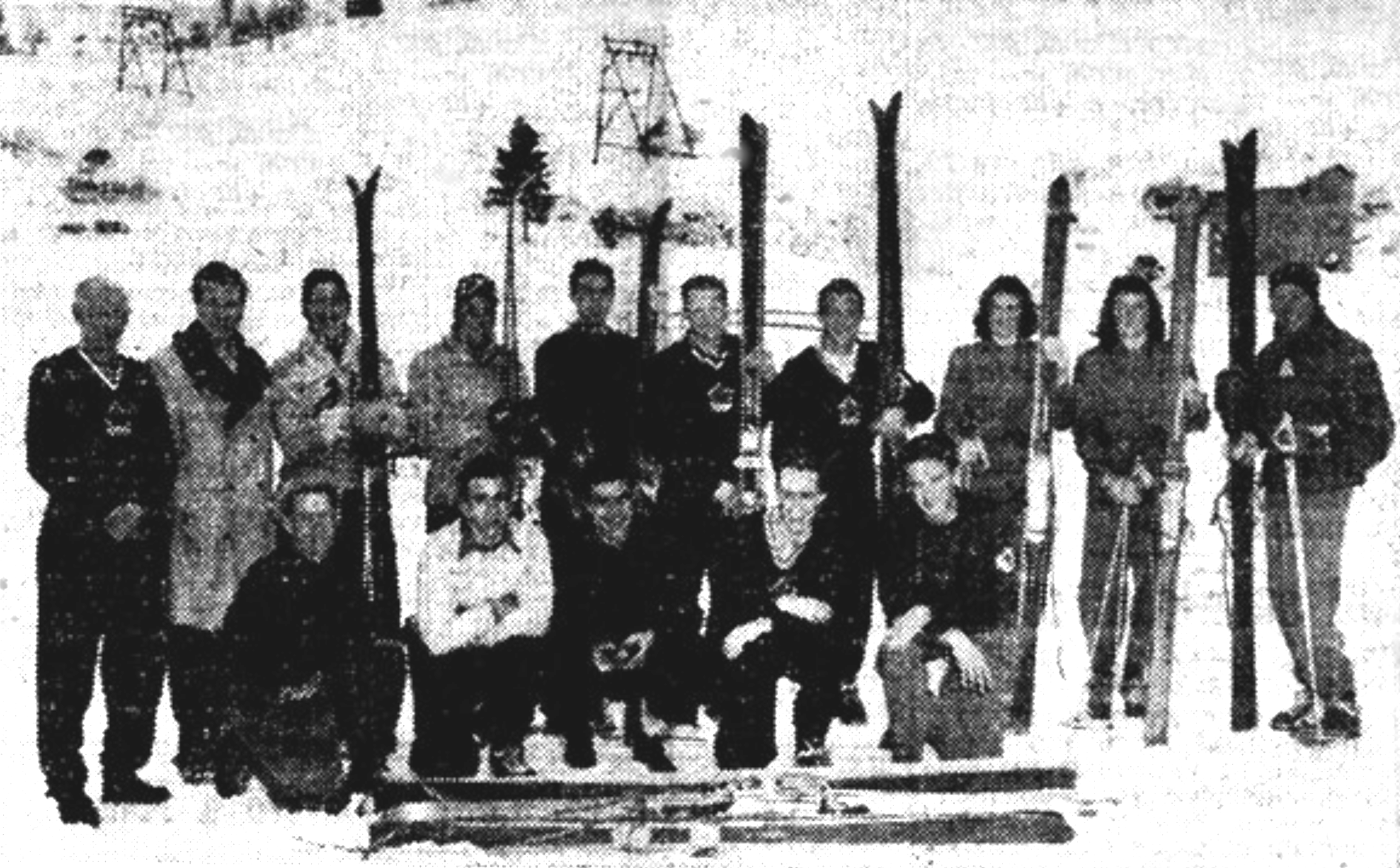
Kneeling from left: Fert Irwin, Hector Sutherland, Noel Paul, Laurent Bernier, Harvey Clifford. Standing up from left: Torney Pickering, Louis Cochand, Bill Irwin, Pierre Jalbert, Iohn Clifford, Tom Mobraaten, Lue Laferte, Rhona Wurtele, Rhoda Wurtele e Emile Allais.

Canada competed at the 1948 Winter Olympics in St. Moritz, Switzerland. Canada has competed at every Winter Olympic Games.

== Medalists ==
Medal	Name	Sport	Event
Gold	Barbara Ann Scott	Figure skating	Women's singles
Gold	Canada men's national ice hockey team (RCAF Flyers): Hubert Brooks; Murray Dowey; Bernard Dunster; R.A. Forbes; A. Gilpin; Jean Gravelle; Patrick Guzzo; Walter Halder; Thomas Hibberd; Ross King; Henri-André Laperriere; John Lecompte; J. Leichnitz; George Mara; Albert Renaud; Reginald Schroeter; Irving Taylor	Ice hockey	Men's competition
Bronze	Suzanne Morrow; Wallace Diestelmeyer	Figure skating	Pairs

Of the 28 athletes participating only 8 did not receive any medals. While the men's hockey medal is counted as one, each of the 17 players received individual medals. The pairs figure skating counted as a single medal.

== Alpine skiing ==
Men

Athlete	Event	Race 1		Race 2		Total	
Athlete	Event	Time	Rank	Time	Rank	Time	Rank
Bill Irwin	Downhill					3:41.3	60
Bert Irwin	Downhill					3:39.1	56
Hector Sutherland	Downhill					3:14.1	28
Harvey Clifford	Downhill					3:14.1	28
Bill Irwin	Slalom	1:40.4	51	1:21.2	45	3:01.6	50
Bert Irwin	Slalom	1:29.4	39	1:16.6	35	2:46.0	37
Hector Sutherland	Slalom	1:19.2	27	1:12.0	28	2:31.2	28
Harvey Clifford	Slalom	1:13.5	19	1:10.2	24	2:23.7	19

Men's combined

The downhill part of this event was held along with the main medal event of downhill skiing. For athletes competing in both events, the same time was used (see table above for the results). The slalom part of the event was held separate from the main medal event of slalom skiing (included in table below).

Athlete	Slalom			Total (downhill + slalom)	
Athlete	Time 1	Time 2	Rank	Points	Rank
Bert Irwin	2:02.5 (+0:05)	1:18.9	61	53.51	49
Bill Irwin	1:32.9	1:12.7	33	39.25	36
Harvey Clifford	1:26.8	1:10.2	23	20.34	21
Hector Sutherland	1:22.8	1:17.3	25	21.72	23

Women

Athlete	Event	Race 1		Race 2		Total	
Athlete	Event	Time	Rank	Time	Rank	Time	Rank
Rhona Wurtele	Downhill					3:26.1	37

== Cross-country skiing ==
Men

Event	Athlete	Race	
Event	Athlete	Time	Rank
18 km	Bill Irwin	1'44:43	81
18 km	Tom Dennie	1'35:41	73
50 km	Tom Dennie	DNF	–

== Figure skating ==
Men

Athlete	CF	FS	Points	Places	Final rank
Wallace Diestelmeyer	13	9	156.322	110	12

Women

Athlete	CF	FS	Points	Places	Final rank
Suzanne Morrow	9	15	143.655	117	14
Marilyn Ruth Take	12	13	143.722	110.5	12
Barbara Ann Scott	1	1	163.077	11	1st place, gold medalist(s)

Pairs

Athletes	Points	Places	Final rank
Suzanne Morrow; Wallace Diestelmeyer	11.000	31	3rd place, bronze medalist(s)

== Ice hockey ==
The tournament was run in a round-robin format with nine teams participating.

	Pld	W	L	T	GF	GA	Pts
Canada (gold)	8	7	0	1	69	5	15
Czechoslovakia	8	7	0	1	80	18	15
Switzerland	8	6	2	0	67	21	12
Sweden	8	4	4	0	55	28	8
Great Britain	8	3	5	0	39	47	6
Poland	8	2	6	0	29	97	4
Austria	8	1	7	0	33	77	2
Italy	8	0	8	0	24	156	0
United States *	8	5	3	0	86	33	10

* United States team was disqualified. Only eight teams are officially ranked.

- Canada 3-1 Sweden
- Canada 3-0 United Kingdom
- Canada 15-0 Poland
- Canada 21-1 Italy
- Canada 12-3 USA
- Canada 0-0 Czechoslovakia
- Canada 12-0 Austria
- Canada 3-0 Switzerland

=== Top scorer ===
Team	GP	G	A	Pts
(Canada) Walter Halder	8	21	8	29

Gold:
Canada
Hubert Brooks
Murray Dowey
Bernard Dunster
R.A. Forbes
A. Gilpin
Jean Gravelle
Patrick Guzzo
Walter Halder
Thomas Hibberd
Ross King
Henri-André Laperriere
John Lecompte
J. Leichnitz
George Mara
Albert Renaud
Reginald Schroeter
Irving Taylor

== Nordic combined ==
Events:

- 18 km cross-country skiing
- normal hill ski jumping

The cross-country skiing part of this event was combined with the main medal event, meaning that athletes competing here were skiing for two disciplines at the same time. Details can be found above in this article, in the cross-country skiing section.

The ski jumping (normal hill) event was held separate from the main medal event of ski jumping, results can be found in the table below. Athletes would perform three jumps, of which the two best jumps (distance and form) were counted.

Athlete	Event	Cross-country		Ski Jumping					Total	
Athlete	Event	Points	Rank	Distance 1	Distance 2	Distance 3	Points	Rank	Points	Rank
Bill Irwin	Individual	99.00	39	51.0	51.0	51.5	181.0	30	280.00	37

== Ski jumping ==
Athlete	Event	Distance 1	Distance 2	Total points	Rank
Bill Irwin	Normal hill	56.0	54.0	175.1	39
Laurent Bernier	Normal hill	58.0	54.5 (fall)	129.3	46
Tom Mobraaten	Normal hill	59.0 (fall)	58.0	135.9	44

== Speed skating ==
Men

Event	Athlete	Race	
Event	Athlete	Time	Rank
500 m	Craig Mackay	DNF	–
500 m	Abe Hardy	45.5	19
500 m	Gordon Audley	45.3	17
500 m	Frank Stack	43.6	6
1500 m	Gordon Audley	2:30.0	32
1500 m	Abe Hardy	2:28.5	29
1500 m	Frank Stack	2:25.7	27
5000 m	Craig Mackay	8:47.2	14
10,000 m	Craig Mackay	20:15.5	13
