= List of Olympic men's ice hockey players for Canada =

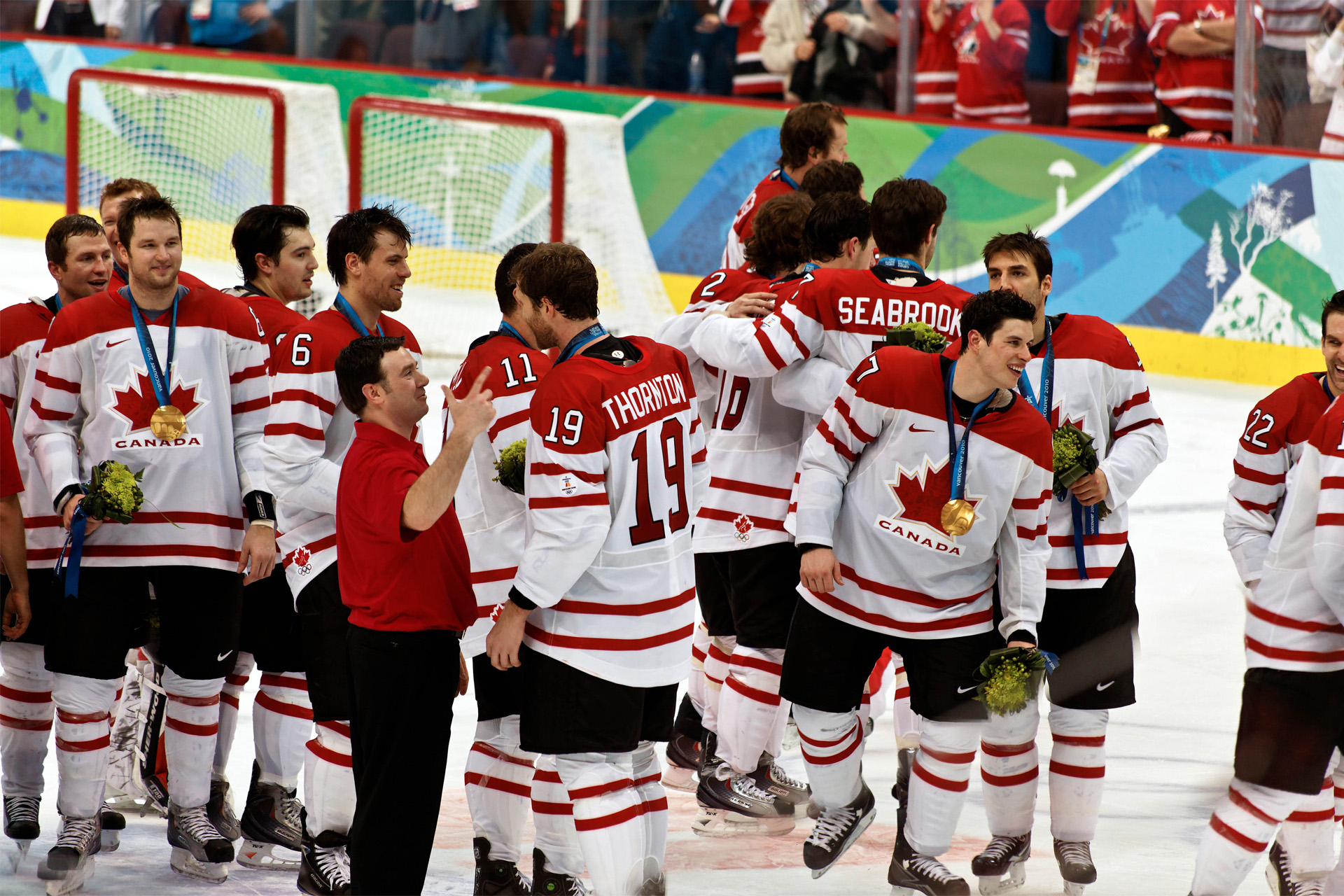
Members of the gold medal-winning Canadian men's ice hockey team at the 2010 Winter Olympics.

Men's ice hockey tournaments have been staged at the Olympic Games since 1920. The men's tournament was introduced at the 1920 Summer Olympics, and permanently added to the Winter Olympic Games in 1924. Canada has participated in 23 of 25 tournaments, sending 44 goaltenders and 348 skaters.

For the first 40 years of the tournament, Canada did not have a national team, instead choosing to send a club team, typically the Allan Cup winner. In 1960, the Kitchener-Waterloo Dutchmen became the final club team to represent Canada at the Olympics. In 1962, Canada implemented a national team program, led by Father David Bauer. Between 1920 and 1952, seven Olympic ice hockey tournaments were held and Canada won six gold medals and a silver in 1936. The Soviet Union began competing in 1956 and frequently defeated the Canadian team. The Soviets won seven gold medals in nine tournaments; during that period Canada won a silver and two bronze medals. The Olympic Games were originally intended for amateur athletes, so the players of the National Hockey League (NHL) and other professional leagues were not allowed to compete. Many of Canada's top players were professional, so the Canadian Amateur Hockey Association (CAHA) pushed for the ability to use professional and amateur players. The International Olympic Committee (IOC) refused, and Canada withdrew from the 1972 and 1976 Olympics in protest. In 1986, the IOC voted to allow all athletes to compete in Olympic Games, starting in 1988. The NHL decided not to allow all players to participate in 1988, 1992 or 1994, because doing so would force the league to halt play during the Olympics. An agreement was reached in 1995 that allowed NHL players to compete in the Olympics, starting with the 1998 Games in Nagano, Japan. National teams are coordinated by Hockey Canada and players are chosen by the team's management staff. In 2018 and 2022, NHL players were not allowed to participate. In 2024, the NHL reached an agreement to allow NHL players to once again compete in the Olympics in 2026 and 2030.

Canada has won nine gold, four silver and three bronze medals in men's ice hockey, more than any other nation. 21 players have been inducted into the Hockey Hall of Fame, twelve into the IIHF Hall of Fame and eight into Canada's Sports Hall of Fame. The Canadian Olympic Hall of Fame has inducted three individuals and five gold medal-winning teams: the 1920 Winnipeg Falcons, 1948 RCAF Flyers, 1952 Edmonton Mercurys and the 2002 and 2010 national teams. One player—Chris Pronger—has played on four teams. Ten others—Rob Blake, Martin Brodeur (named to 4 rosters, but played in 3), Adam Foote, Jarome Iginla, Eric Lindros, Roberto Luongo, Terry O'Malley, Rick Nash, Joe Sakic and Wally Schreiber—have played on three teams. According to the IOC database, 252 men have won medals; 15 players—Brodeur, Patrice Bergeron, Sidney Crosby, Drew Doughty, Ryan Getzlaf, Iginla, Duncan Keith, Roberto Luongo, Patrick Marleau, Nash, Scott Niedermayer, Corey Perry, Pronger, Jonathan Toews and Shea Weber—have won two gold medals. Eight others players—Lindros, Schreiber, Fabian Joseph, Brad Schlegel, Paul Kariya, Ken Laufman, Floyd Martin and Donald Rope—have won two medals. Chris Pronger holds the record for most games played, having dressed for 25 games in four Olympics between 1998 and 2010. Wally Schreiber is second in games played, with 24 games in 1988, 1992 and 1994. Harry Watson leads Canadian Olympians in goals, having scored 36 goals in 1924 (before assists were counted); Walter Halder scored 29 points (21 goals and 8 assists) in 1948; and Ken Laufman recorded 14 assists in 1956 and 1960.

== Key ==
Abbreviations
GP	Games played
HHOF	Hockey Hall of Fame
IIHFHOF	IIHF Hall of Fame
COHOF	Canadian Olympic Hall of Fame
CSHOF	Canada's Sports Hall of Fame

Goaltenders
W	Wins	SO	Shutouts
L	Losses	GA	Goals against
T	Ties	GAA	Goals against average

Skaters
P	Points	G	Goals
PIM	Penalty minutes	A	Assists

== Goaltenders ==
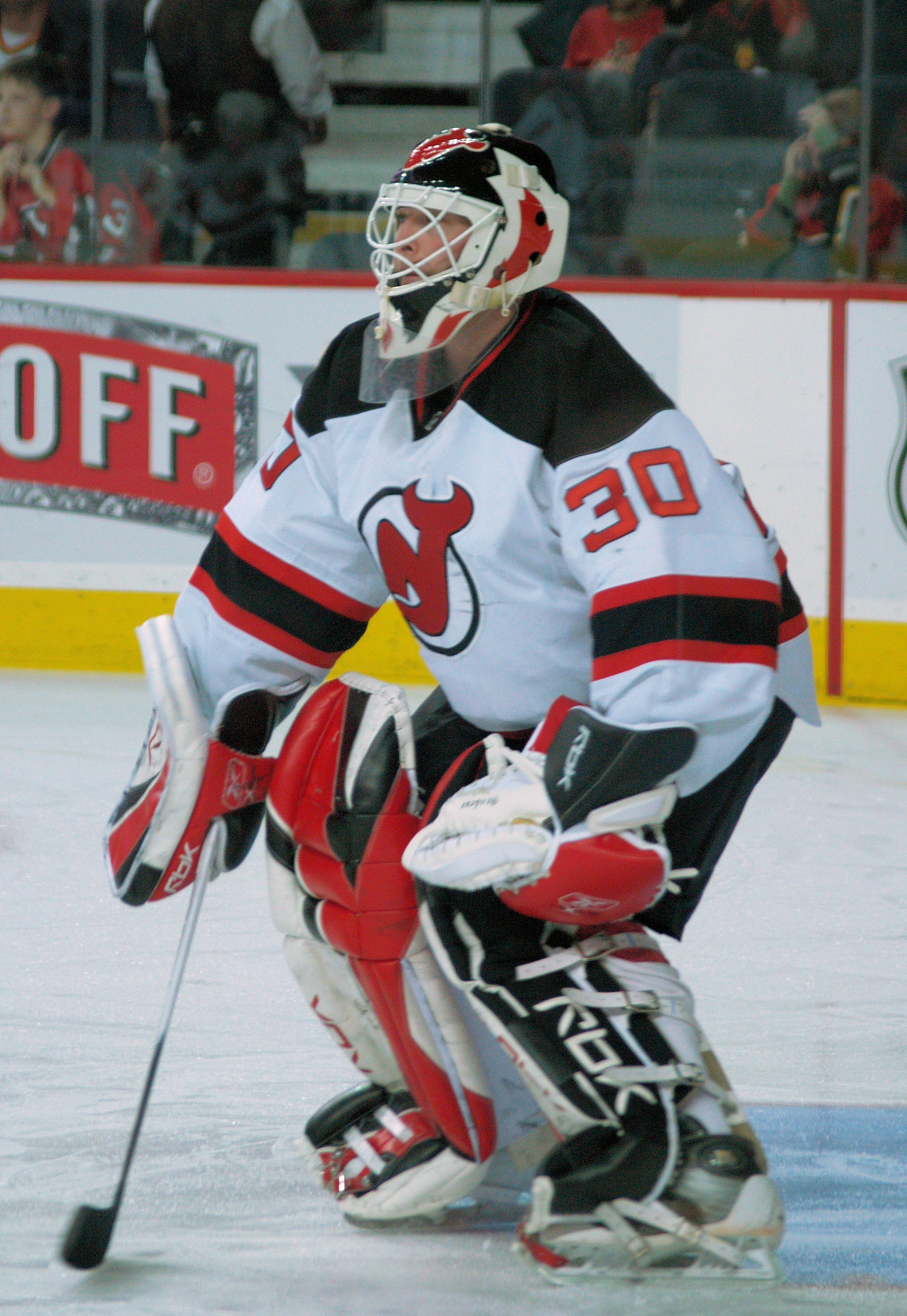
Martin Brodeur is the only Canadian goaltender to participate in four Olympic tournaments, winning gold medals in 2002 and 2010.

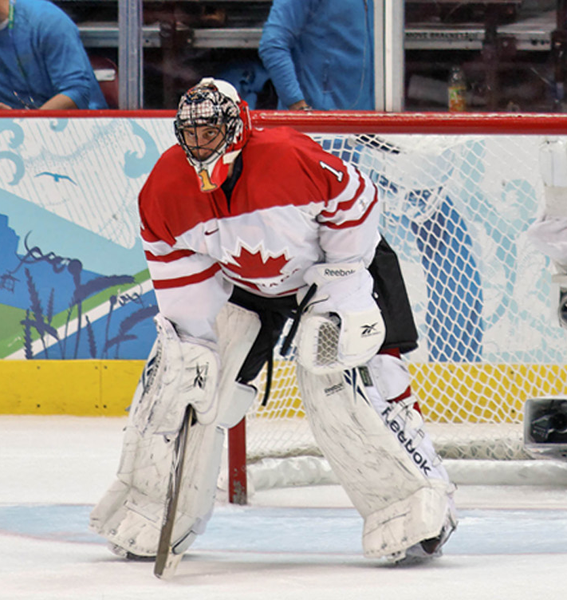
Roberto Luongo played for Canada at the 2006, 2010 and 2014 Winter Olympics, winning a gold in the latter two years.

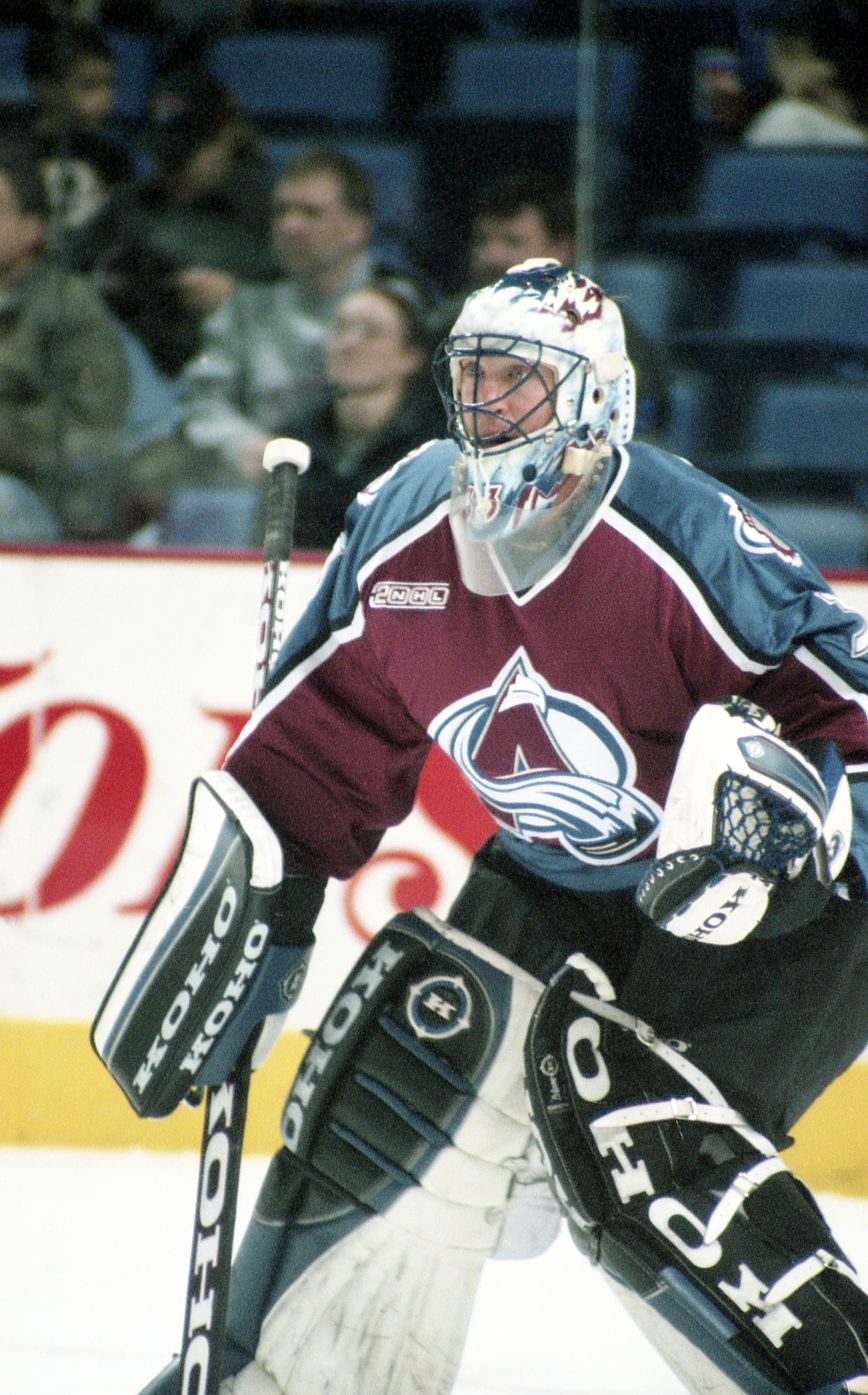
Patrick Roy was Canada's starting goaltender at the 1998 Winter Olympics.

Player	Olympics	GP	W	L	T	SO	GA	GAA	Medals	Notes	Ref.
Ken Broderick	1964, 1968	11	4	3	0	1	24	3.18	Bronze (1968)		
Denis Brodeur	1956	4	3	1	0	1	8	2.00	Bronze (1956)		
Martin Brodeur	1998^{[N 3]}, 2002–2010	11	6	3	1	1	23	2.08	Gold (2002); Gold (2010)	COHOF (2009); HHOF (2018)	
Sean Burke	1988, 1992	11	6	4	1	0	29	2.60	Silver (1992)		
Walter Byron	1920	3	3	0	0	2	1	0.50	Gold (1920)	COHOF (2006)	
Jack Cameron	1924	3	3	0	0	2	1	0.40	Gold (1924)		
William Cockburn	1932	5	4	0	1	2	4	0.91	Gold (1932)	Team Captain (1932)	
Ernie Collett	1924	2	2	0	0	1	2	1.33	Gold (1924)	Flag bearer (1924)	
Murray Dowey	1948	8	7	0	1	5	5	0.62	Gold (1948)	COHOF (2008)	
Bob Dupuis	1980	3	1	2	0	0	7	3.41			
Darren Eliot	1984	2	0	0	0	0	2	3.00			
Mario Gosselin	1984	7	4	3	0	0	14	2.21			
Ralph Hansch	1952	6	5	0	1	0	12	2.00	Gold (1952)	COHOF (2002)	
Don Head	1960	7	5	1	0	2	12	1.87	Silver (1960)		
Corey Hirsch	1994	8	5	2	1	0	18	2.18	Silver (1994)		
Harold Hurley	1960	1	1	0	0	0	3	5.14	Silver (1960)		
Curtis Joseph	1998^{[N 3]}, 2002	1	0	1	0	0	5	5.00	Gold (2002)	COHOF (2009)	
Trevor Kidd	1992	1	1	0	0	0	0	0.00	Silver (1992)		
Roberto Luongo	2006–2014	8	7	1	0	2	12	1.69	Gold (2010); Gold (2014)	HHOF (2022)	
Seth Martin	1964	6	4	1	0	1	5	1.21		IIHFHOF (1997)	
Andy Moog	1988	4	4	0	0	1	9	2.25			
Francis Moore	1936	5	4	1	0	2	5	1.33	Silver (1936)		
Norbert Mueller	1928	1	1	0	0	1	0	0.00	Gold (1928)		
Arthur Nash	1936	3	3	0	0	2	2	0.89	Silver (1936)		
Paul Pageau	1980	4	2	1	0	1	11	2.77			
Edward Pasquale	2022	2	1	1	0	0	5	2.55			
Eric Paterson	1952	2	2	0	0	1	2	1.00	Gold (1952)	COHOF (2002)	
Kevin Poulin	2018	4	3	1	0	1	8	2.25	Bronze (2018)		
Carey Price	2014	5	5	0	0	2	3	0.60	Gold (2014)		
Patrick Roy	1998	6	4	2	0	1	9	1.46		HHOF (2006); CSHOF (2010)	
Ben Scrivens	2018	3	1	1	0	0	3	1.21	Bronze (2018)		
Wayne Stephenson	1968	3	2	0	0	1	3	1.29	Bronze (1968)		
Joseph Sullivan	1928	2	2	0	0	2	0	0.00	Gold (1928)		
Matt Tomkins	2022	3	2	1	0	1	3	1.01			
Stanley Wagner	1932	1	1	0	0	1	0	0.00	Gold (1932)		
Keith Woodall	1956	4	3	1	0	2	4	1.00	Bronze (1956)		

=== Reserve goaltenders ===
These goaltenders were named to the Olympic roster, but did not receive any ice time during games.

Player	Olympics	Medals	Notes	Ref.
Ed Belfour	2002	Gold (2002)	COHOF (2009); HHOF (2011)	
Marc-André Fleury	2010	Gold (2010)		
Manny Legacé	1994	Silver (1994)		
Devon Levi	2022			
Mike Smith	2014	Gold (2014)		
Sam St. Laurent	1992	Silver (1992)		
Marty Turco	2006			

== Skaters ==
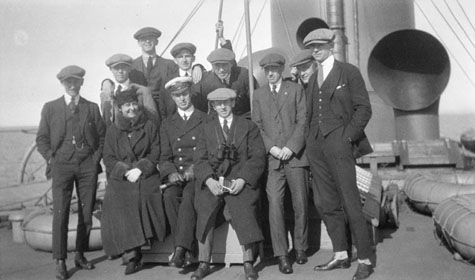
The gold medal-winning Winnipeg Falcons en route to the 1920 Olympics (photo includes an unidentified ships' officer and a woman).

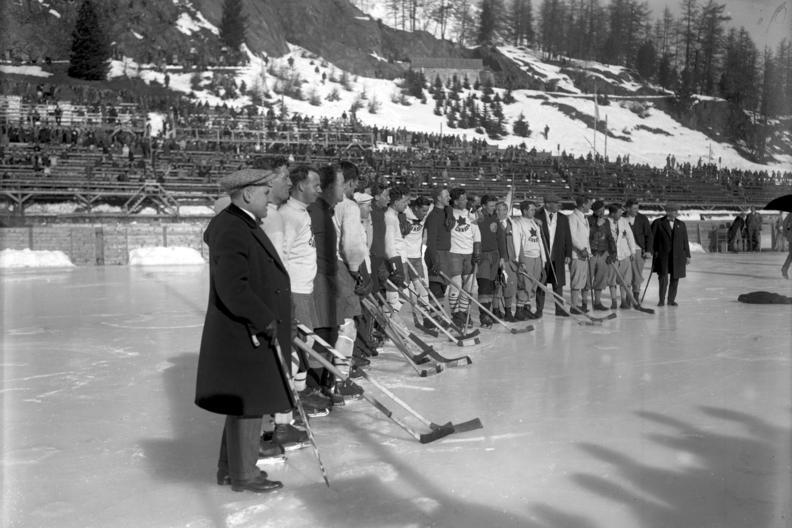
A game between Canada and Sweden during the 1928 Winter Olympics.

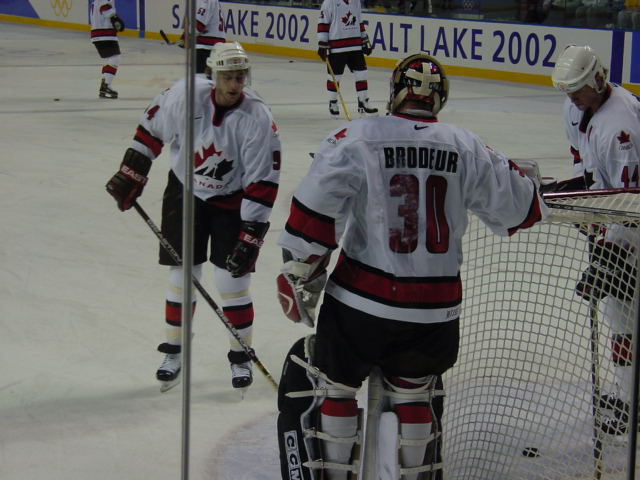
(Left to right) Ryan Smyth, Martin Brodeur and Chris Pronger were part of the gold medal-winning team in 2002.

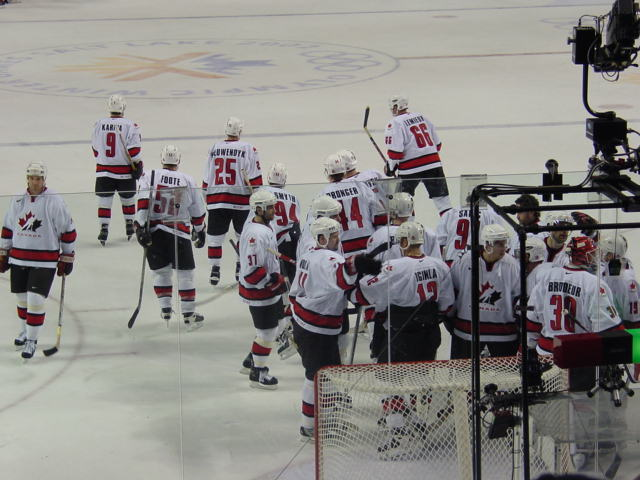
The gold medal-winning Canadian men's ice hockey team at the 2002 Winter Olympics.

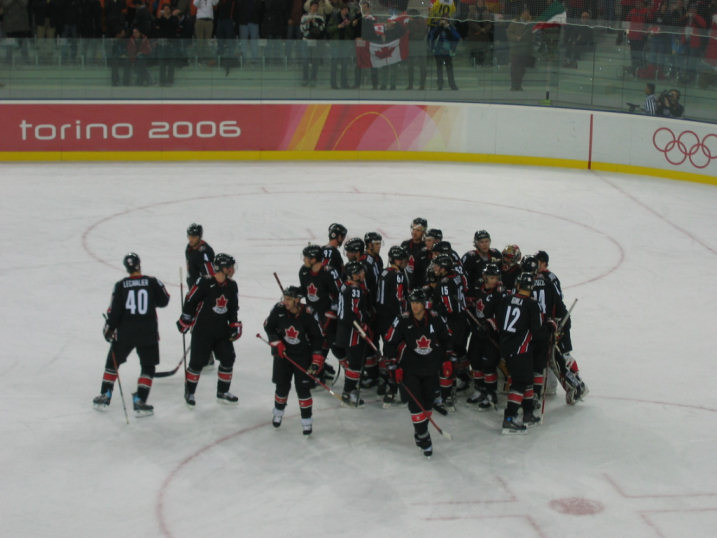
The Canadian team in 2006

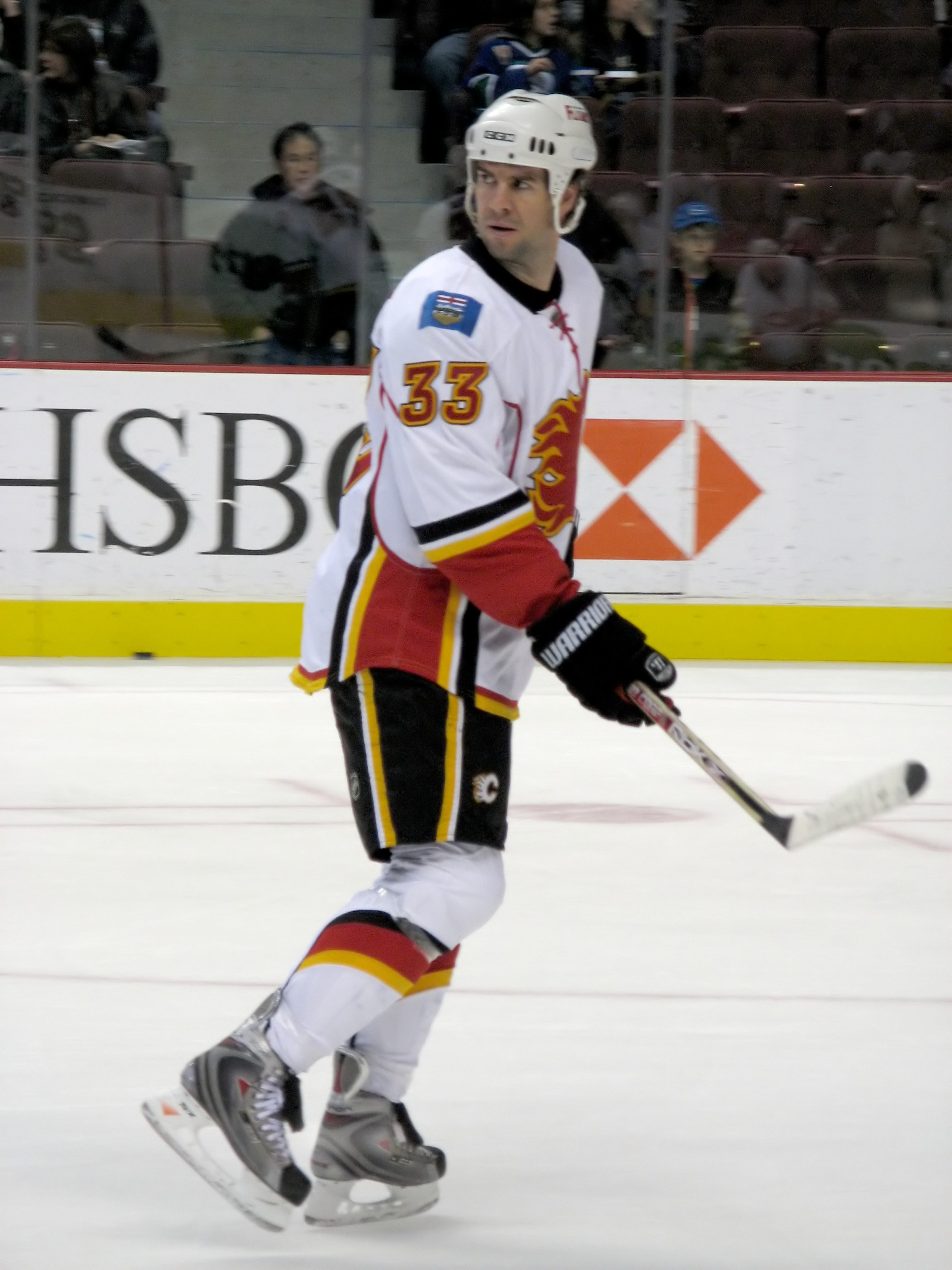
Adrian Aucoin won a silver medal at the 1994 Winter Olympics.

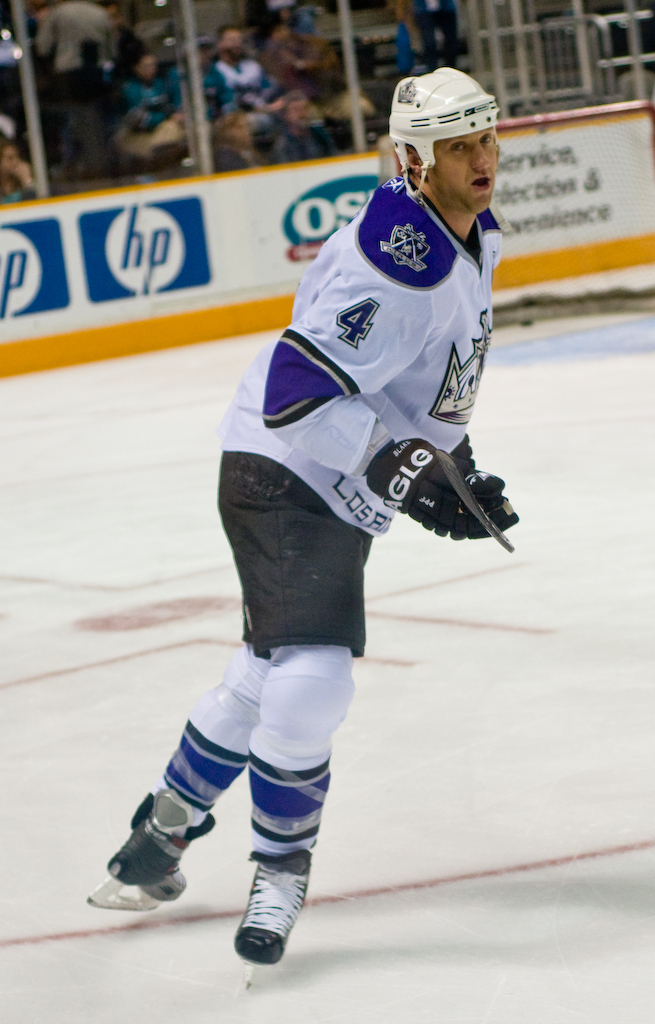
Rob Blake has played in three tournaments, winning a gold medal in 2002.

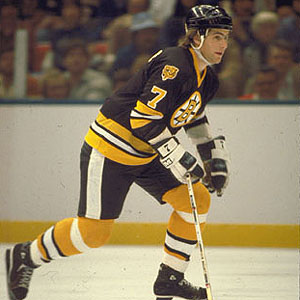
Ray Bourque played for the 1998 team.

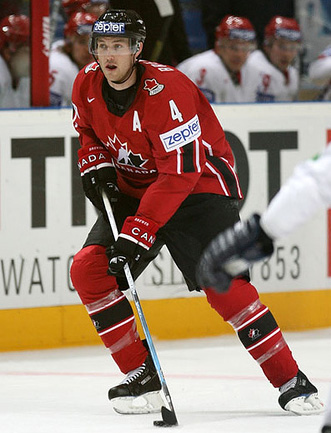
Eric Brewer won a gold medal at the 2002 Olympics.

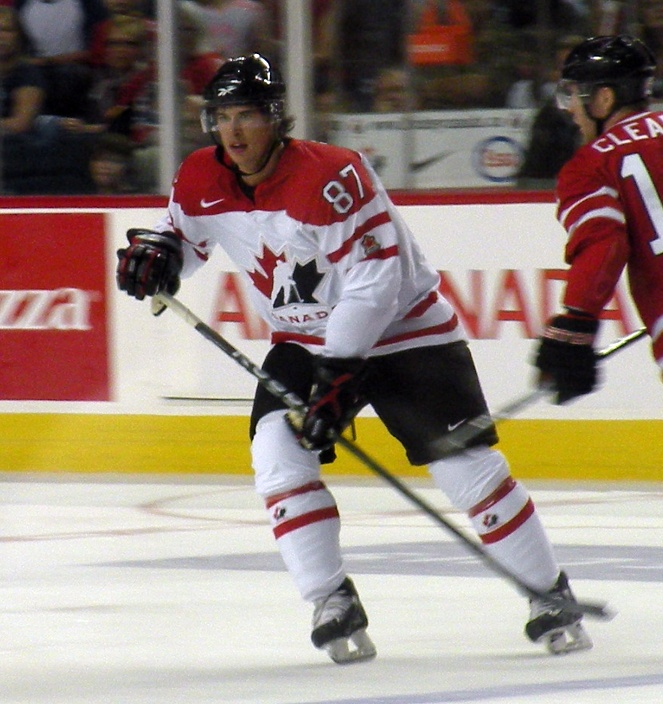
Sidney Crosby won a gold medal at the 2010 and 2014 Olympics.

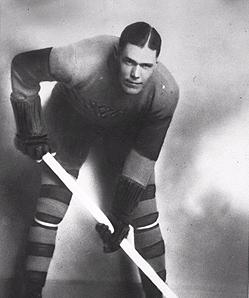
Frank Fredrickson was captain of the 1920 gold medal-winning Winnipeg Falcons.

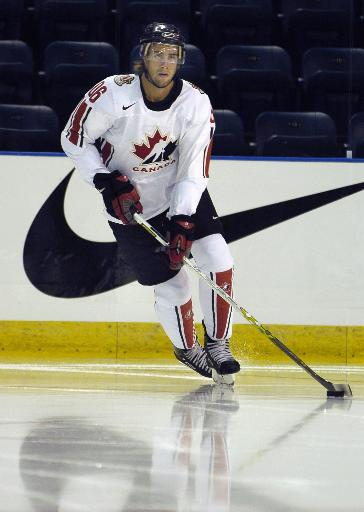
Simon Gagné won a gold medal in 2002 and also played in the 2006 tournament.

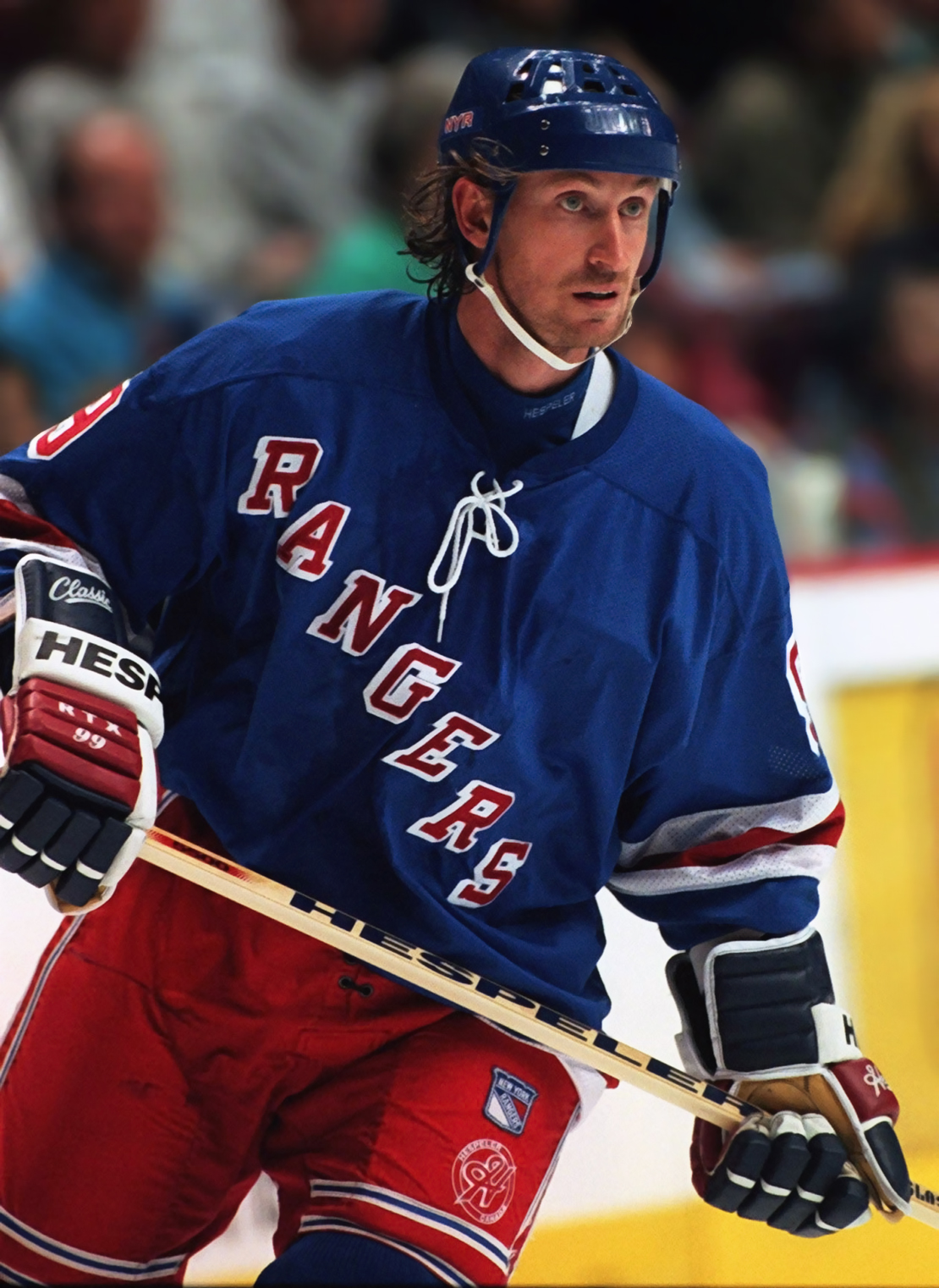
Wayne Gretzky played in 1998 and served as the team's Executive Director in 2002 and 2006.

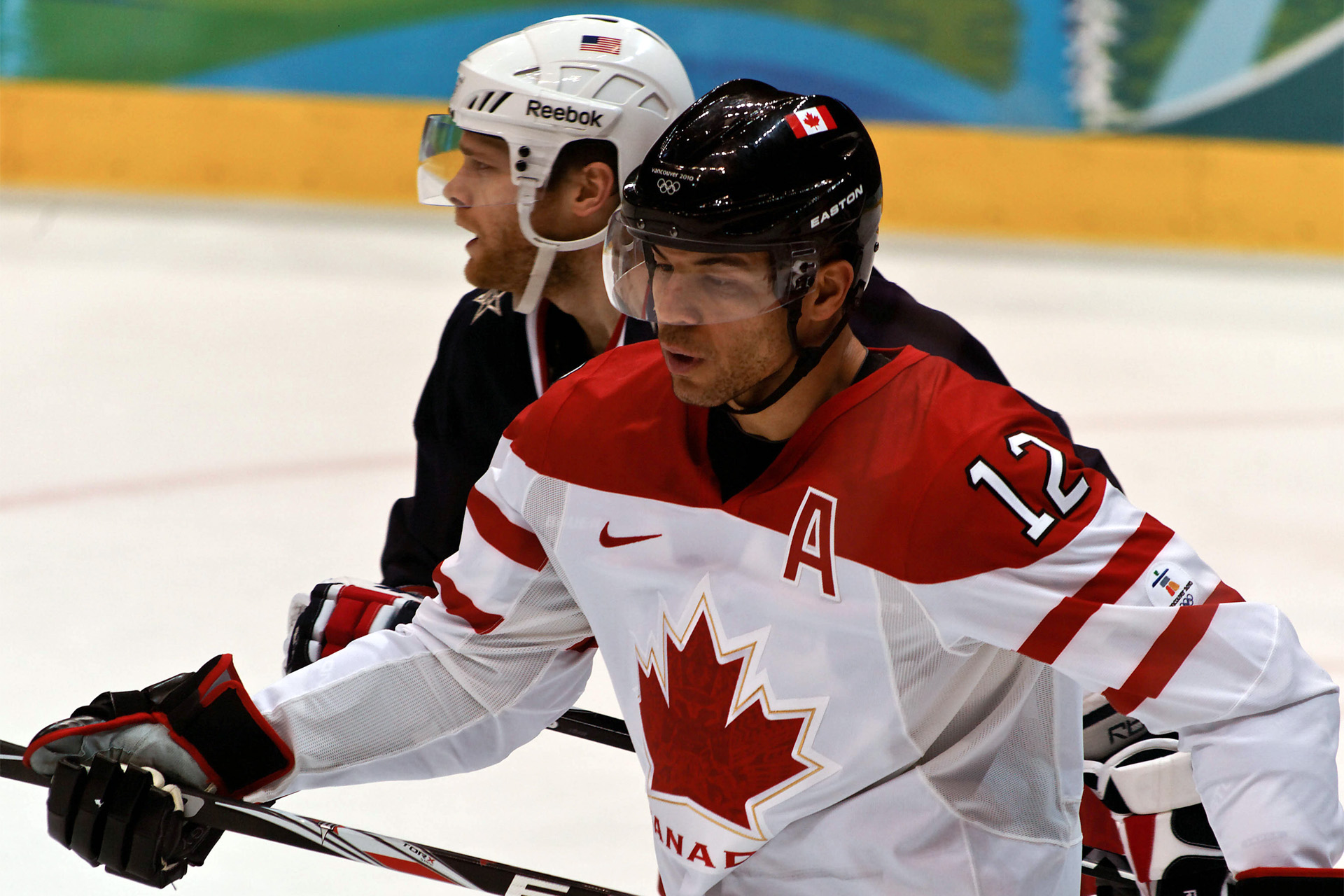
Jarome Iginla won gold medals in 2002 and 2010, and also played in the 2006 tournament.

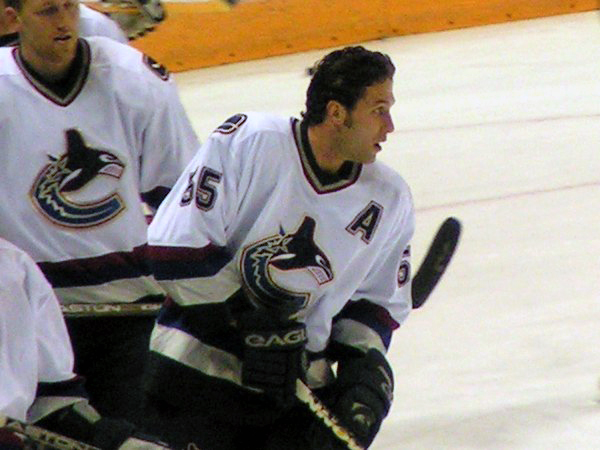
Ed Jovanovski won a gold medal in 2002 and was named to the 2006 team but did not play due to injury.

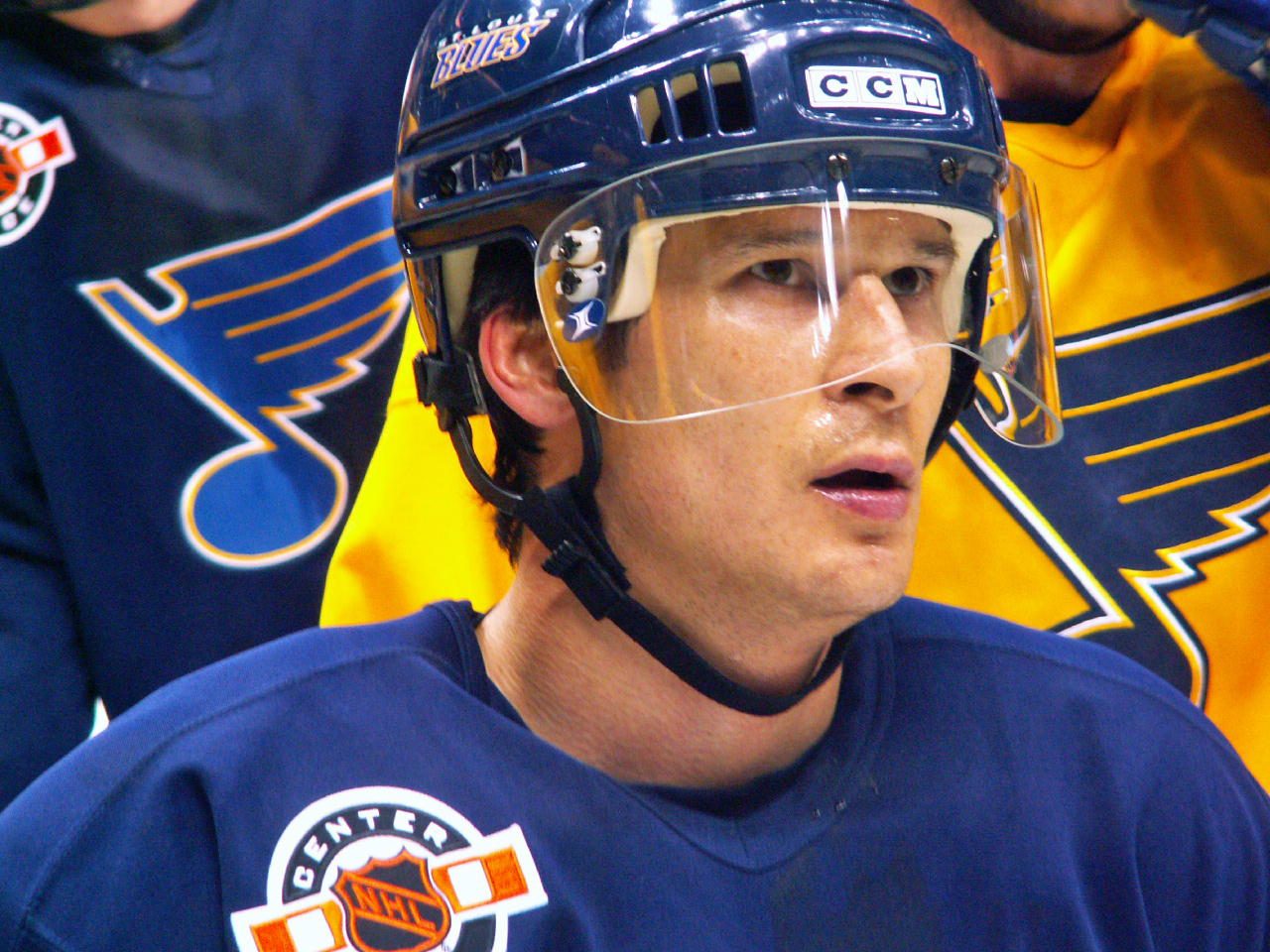
Paul Kariya won a silver medal in 1994 and a gold medal in 2002.

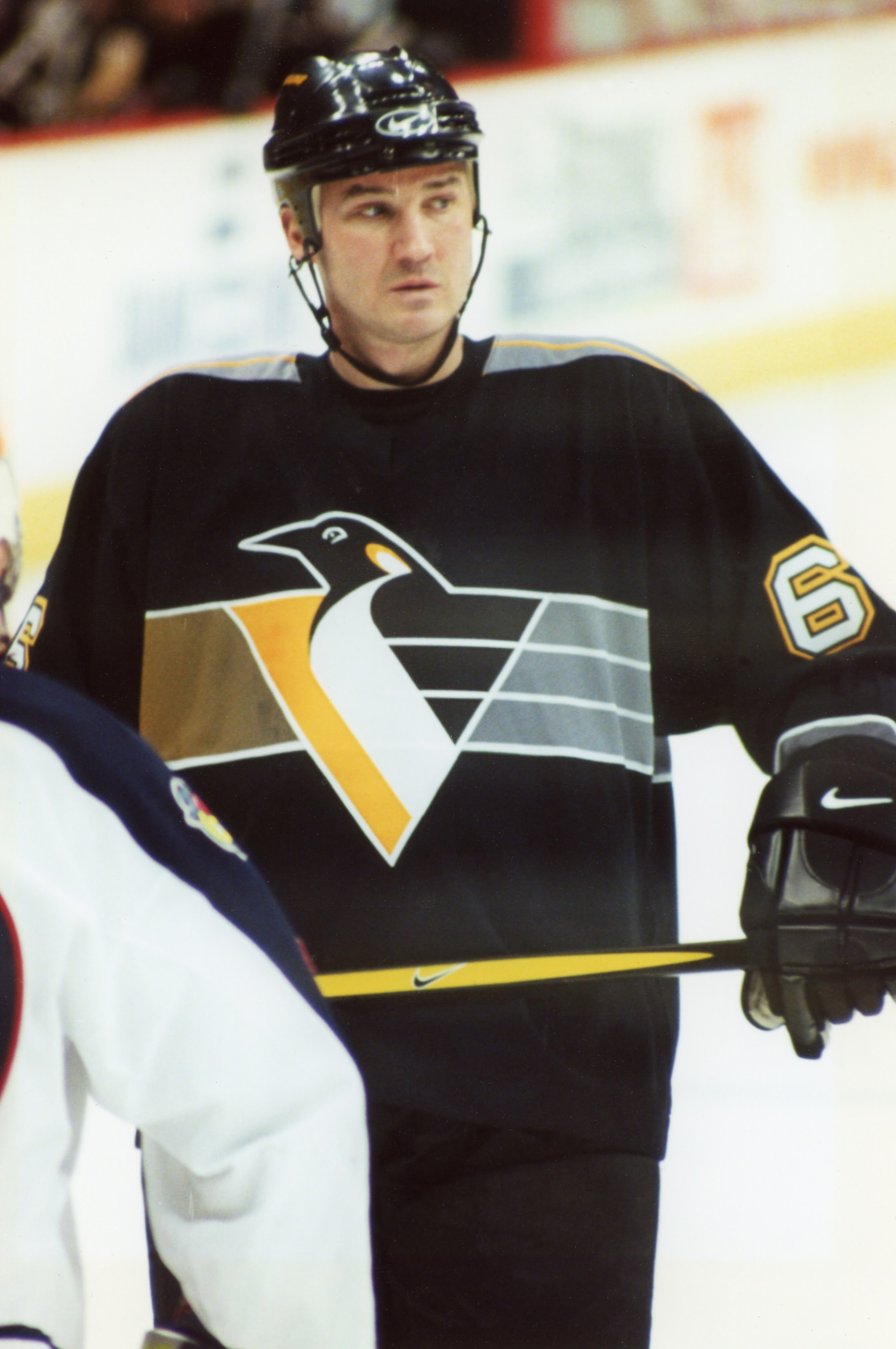
Mario Lemieux was captain of the 2002 gold medal-winning team.

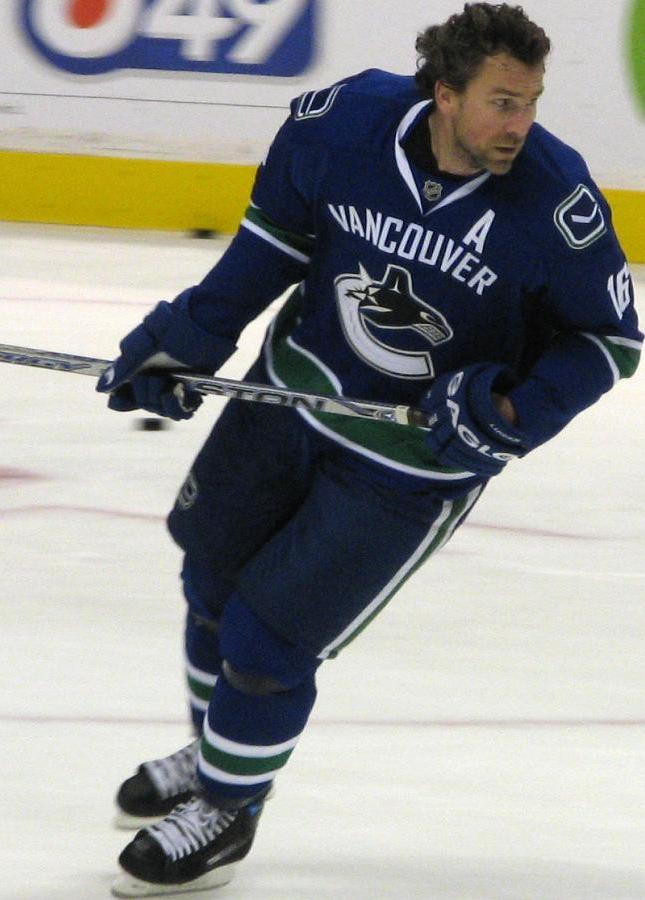
Trevor Linden played for the 1998 team.

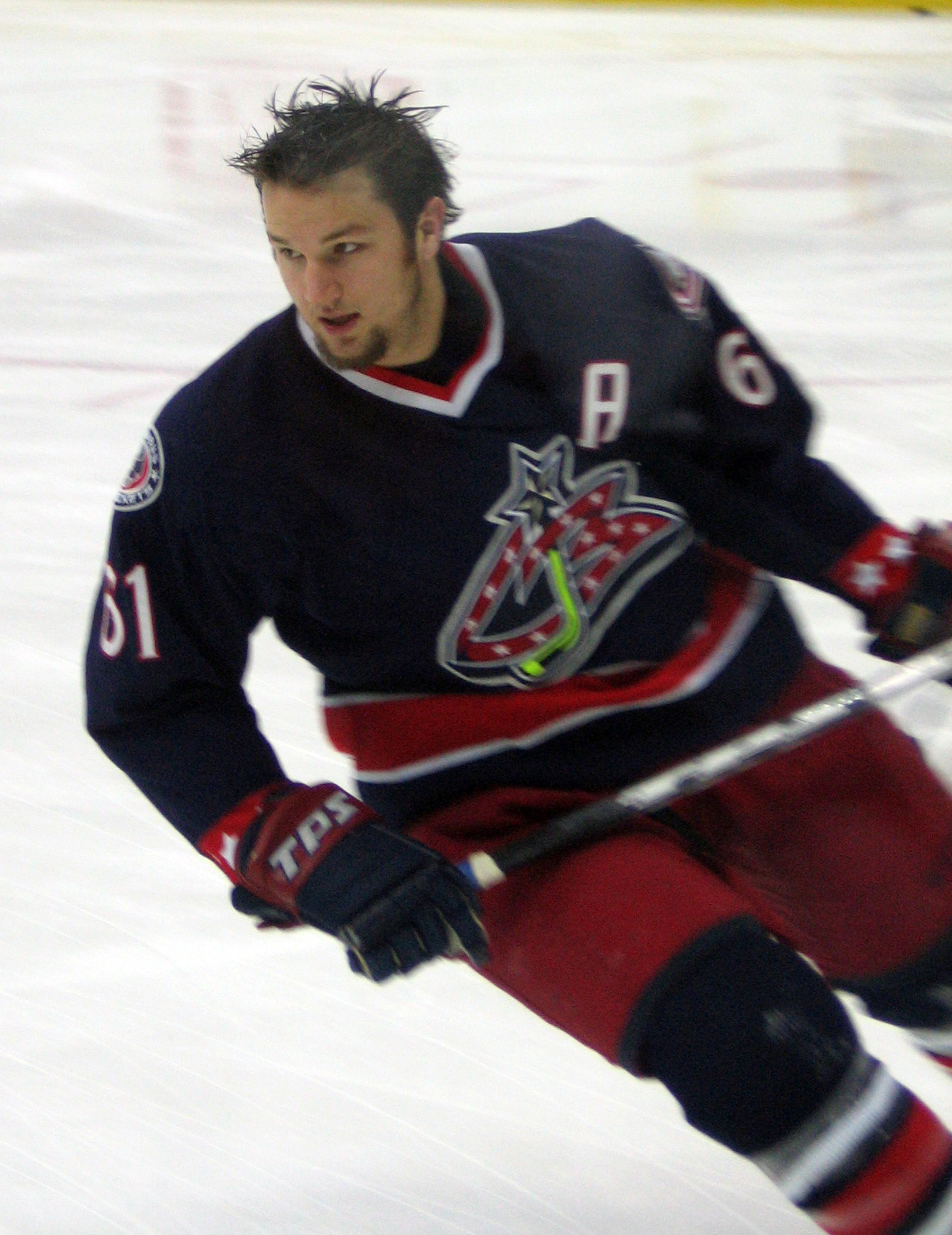
Rick Nash won gold medals in 2010 and 2014, and also played for the 2006 team.

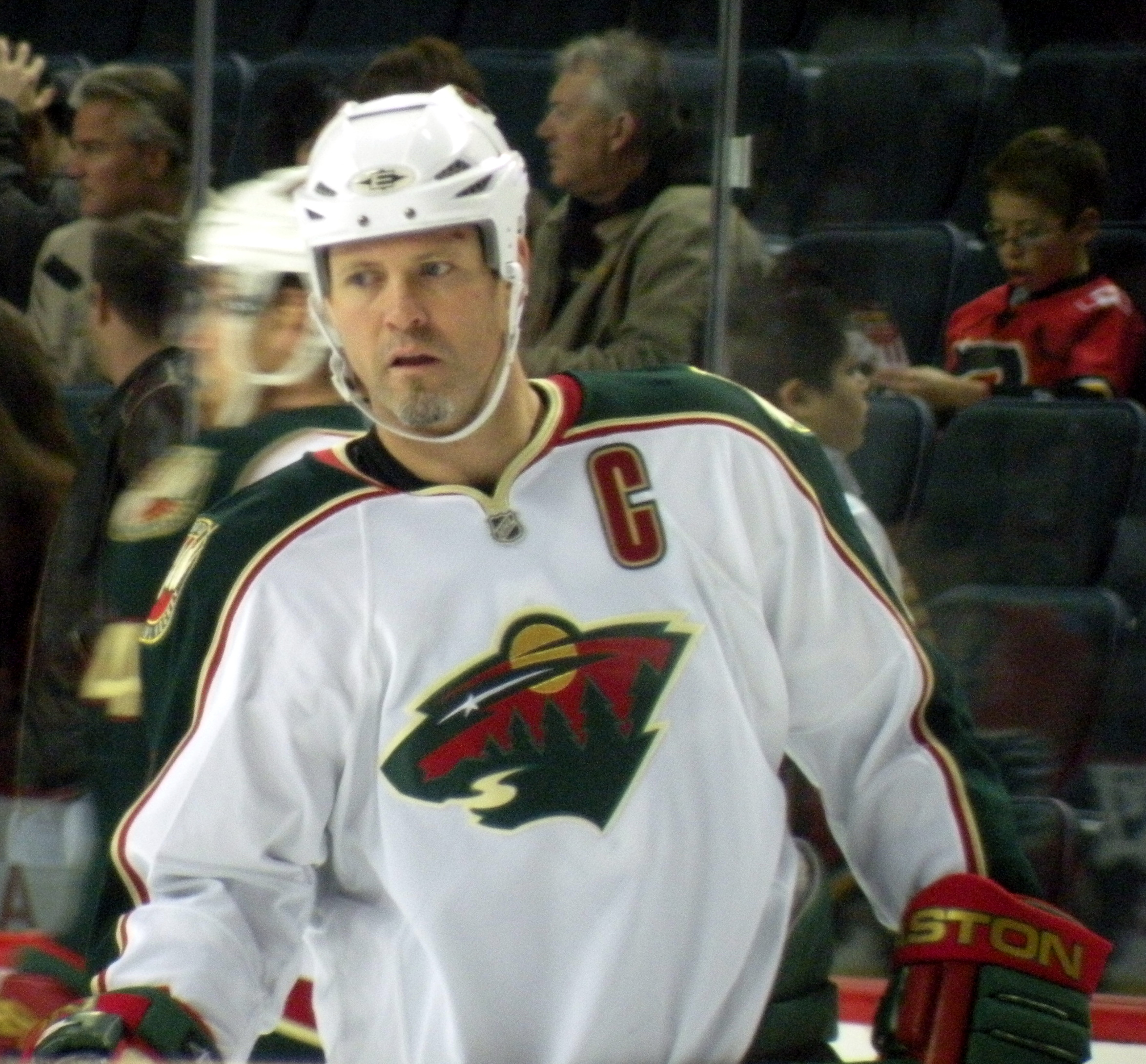
Owen Nolan won a gold medal in 2002.

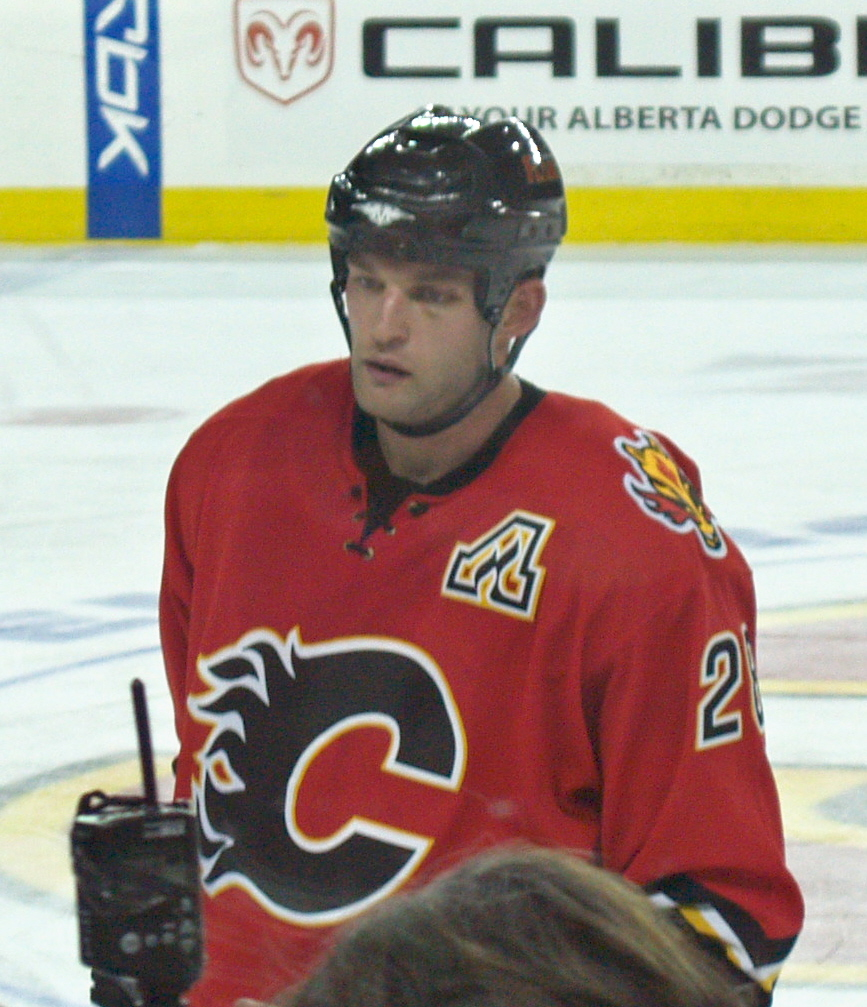
Robyn Regehr played for the 2006 team.

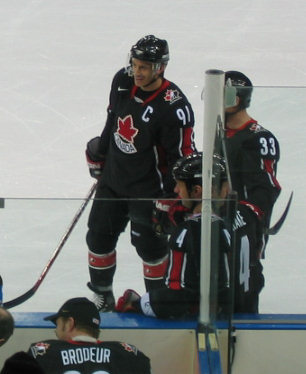
Joe Sakic played in 1998, won a gold medal in 2002 and was captain of the team in 2006.

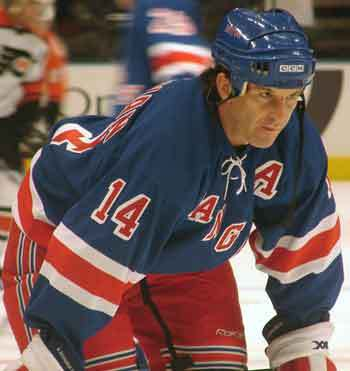
Brendan Shanahan played in 1998 and won a gold medal in 2002.

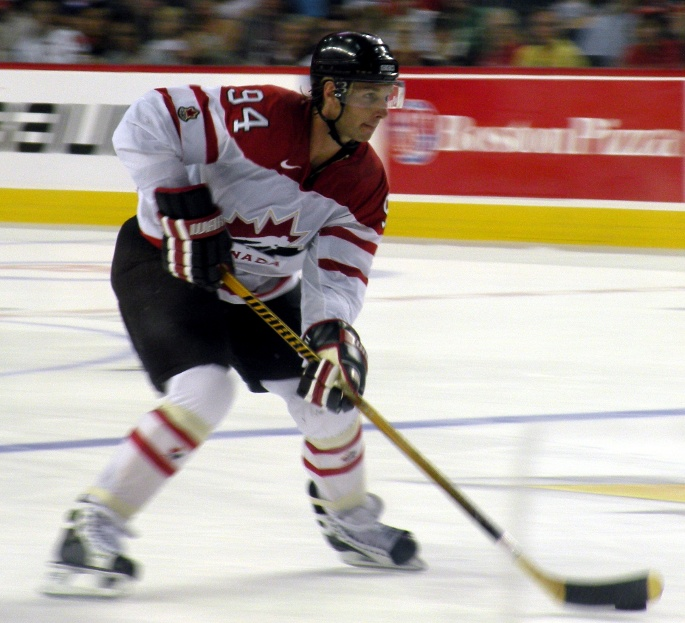
Ryan Smyth won a gold medal in 2002 and was part of the team in 2006.

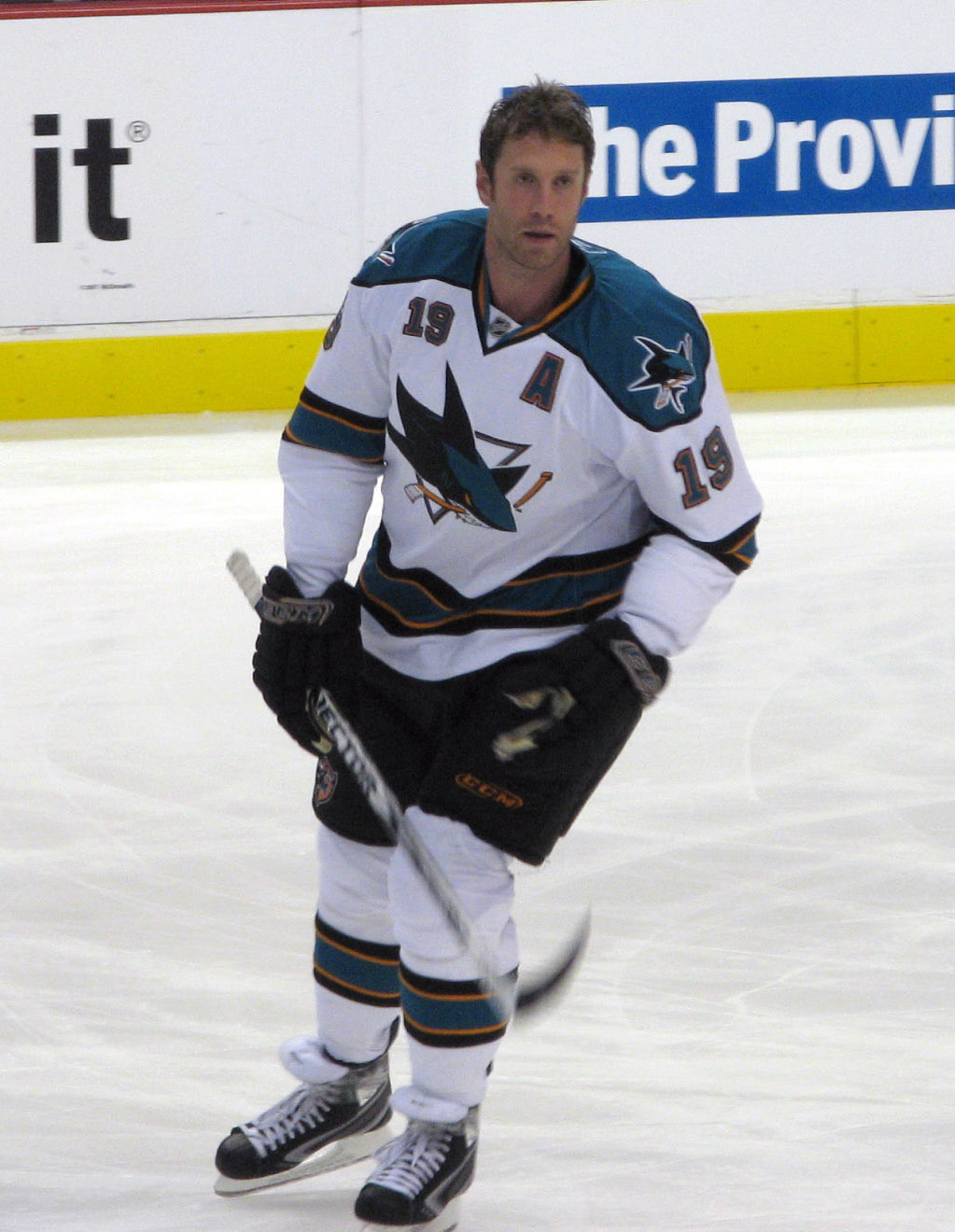
Joe Thornton won a gold medal in 2010, and also played for the 2006 team.

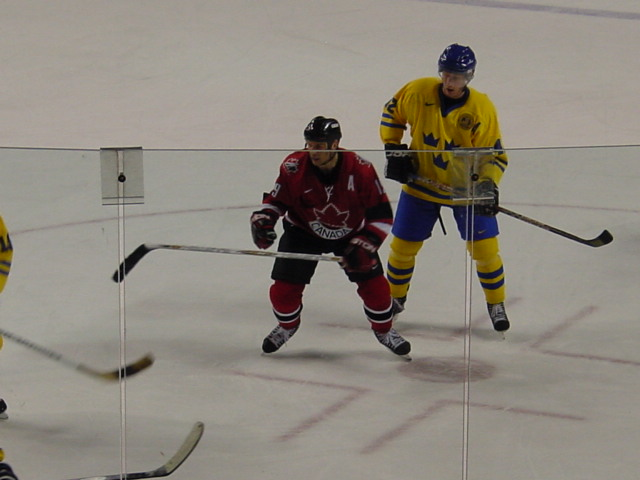
Steve Yzerman played in the 1998 and 2002 Olympics, winning a gold medal in 2002. He also served as the team's Executive Director in 2010.

Player	Olympics	GP	G	A	P	PIM	Medals	Notes	Ref.
George Abel	1952	8	6	6	12	2	Gold (1952)	COHOF (2002)	
Hank Akervall	1964	7	2	0	2	9		Team Captain (1964)	
Glenn Anderson	1980	6	2	2	4	4		HHOF (2008)	
Warren Anderson	1980, 1984	13	1	0	1	4			
Dave Archibald	1992	8	7	1	8	18	Silver (1992)		
Mark Astley	1994	8	0	1	1	4	Silver (1994)		
Bob Attersley	1960	7	6	12	18	4	Silver (1960)		
Adrian Aucoin	1994	4	0	0	0	2	Silver (1994)		
Mark Barberio	2022	5	0	0	0	2			
Robin Bartel	1984	6	0	1	1	4			
Gary Begg	1964	7	1	0	1	2			
Jamie Benn	2014	6	2	0	2	4	Gold (2014)		
Maurice Benoît	1960	7	1	3	4	18	Silver (1960)		
Robert Benson	1920	3	1	—	1	—	Gold (1920)	COHOF (2006)	
Patrice Bergeron	2010, 2014	13	0	3	3	4	Gold (2010); Gold (2014)		
Ken Berry	1980, 1988	14	6	5	11	12			
Todd Bertuzzi	2006	6	0	3	3	6			
Rob Blake	1998–2006	18	2	4	6	6	Gold (2002)	COHOF (2009)	
Serge Boisvert	1988	8	7	2	9	2			
Roger Bourbonnais	1964, 1968	14	4	7	11	0	Bronze (1968)	IIHFHOF (1999)	
Ray Bourque	1998	6	1	2	3	4		HHOF (2004)	
Rene Bourque	2018	6	3	1	4	2	Bronze (2018)		
Jay Bouwmeester	2006, 2014	12	0	0	1	0	Gold (2014)		
Dan Boyle	2006^{[N 4]}, 2010	7	1	5	6	2	Gold (2010)		
Brian Bradley	1988	7	0	4	4	0			
Eric Brewer	2002	6	2	0	2	0	Gold (2002)	COHOF (2009)	
Rod Brind'Amour	1998	6	1	2	3	0			
Charles Brooker	1956	5	3	4	7	2	Bronze (1956)		
Todd Brost	1992	8	0	4	4	4	Silver (1992)		
Gilbert Brulé	2018	5	2	1	3	25	Bronze (2018)		
Ray Cadieux	1964, 1968	14	8	2	10	8	Bronze (1968)		
Jeff Carter	2014	6	3	2	5	2	Gold (2014)		
Terry Clancy	1964	7	1	1	2	2			
William Colvin	1956	4	0	4	4	0	Bronze (1956)		
Brian Conacher	1964	7	7	1	8	6			
Paul Conlin	1964, 1968	14	0	0	0	4	Bronze (1968)		
James Connelly	1960	7	5	3	8	14	Silver (1960)		
Shayne Corson	1998	6	1	1	2	2			
Russ Courtnall	1984	7	1	3	4	2			
Adam Cracknell	2022	5	0	1	1	0			
Sidney Crosby	2010, 2014	13	5	5	10	4	Gold (2010); Gold (2014)	Team Captain (2014)	
Clifford Crowley	1932	1	0	0	0	0	Gold (1932)		
Kevin Dahl	1992	8	2	0	2	6	Silver (1992)		
J. J. Daigneault	1984	7	1	1	2	0			
Dan D'Alvise	1980	6	3	3	6	8			
Ron Davidson	1980	6	1	4	5	0			
John Davies	1952	8	4	3	7	6	Gold (1952)	COHOF (2002)	
Billy Dawe	1952	8	6	6	12	2	Gold (1952)	Team Captain (1952); COHOF (2002)	
Maxwell Deacon	1936	4	0	1	1	0	Silver (1936)		
Charles Delahaye	1928	1	0	—	0	—	Gold (1928)		
Jason Demers	2022	5	0	2	2	0			
David Desharnais	2022	5	0	1	1	0			
Éric Desjardins	1998	6	0	0	0	2			
John Devaney	1980	6	4	3	7	6			
Robert Dickson	1952	8	7	2	9	0	Gold (1952)	COHOF (2002)	
Gary Dineen	1964, 1968	14	4	8	12	16	Bronze (1968)		
Kevin Dineen	1984	7	0	0	0	8			
Shane Doan	2006	6	2	1	3	2			
Dave Donnelly	1984	7	1	1	2	12			
Drew Doughty	2010, 2014	13	4	4	8	2	Gold (2010); Gold (2014)		
Jack Douglas	1960	7	3	2	5	6	Silver (1960)		
Kris Draper	2006	6	0	0	0	0			
Bruce Driver	1984	7	3	1	4	10			
Matt Duchene	2014	4	0	0	0	0	Gold (2014)		
Albert Duncanson	1932	1	1	0	1	0	Gold (1932)		
Bernard Dunster	1948	8	1	0	1	8	Gold (1948)	COHOF (2008)	
Andrew Ebbett	2018	5	2	1	3	0	Bronze (2018)		
Stefan Elliott	2018	2	0	0	0	0	Bronze (2018)		
Morgan Ellis	2022	2	0	0	0	5			
Fred Etcher	1960	7	9	12	21	0	Silver (1960)		
Kenneth Farmer	1936	8	10	4	14	0	Silver (1936)	COHOF (1971)	
Hugh Farquharson	1936	8	11	8	19	2	Silver (1936)		
Chris Felix	1988	6	1	2	3	2			
Landon Ferraro	2022	1	0	0	0	0			
Frank Fisher	1928	1	1	—	1	—	Gold (1928)		
Pat Flatley	1984	7	3	3	6	70			
Theoren Fleury	1998, 2002	12	1	5	6	8	Gold (2002)	COHOF (2009)	
Adam Foote	1998–2006	18	1	2	3	12	Gold (2002)	COHOF (2009)	
Robert Forhan	1960, 1964	13	8	5	13	0	Silver (1960)		
Frank Fredrickson	1920	3	12	—	12	2	Gold (1920)	Team Captain (1920); HHOF (1958); COHOF (2006)	
Chris Fridfinnson	1920	3	1	—	1	—	Gold (1920)	COHOF (2006)	
Simon Gagné	2002, 2006	12	2	5	7	6	Gold (2002)	COHOF (2009)	
Dave Gagner	1984	7	5	2	7	6			
George Garbutt	1932	1	0	1	1	0	Gold (1932)		
Donald Gauf	1952	7	3	0	3	4	Gold (1952)	COHOF (2002)	
Chay Genoway	2018	6	0	1	1	4	Bronze (2018)		
Ryan Getzlaf	2010, 2014	13	4	6	10	6	Gold (2010); Gold (2014)		
Billy Gibson	1952	8	15	7	22	6	Gold (1952)	COHOF (2002)	
Curt Giles	1992	8	1	0	1	6	Silver (1992)		
Brian Glennie	1968	7	0	1	1	10	Bronze (1968)	CSHOF (2005)	
Cody Goloubef	2018	6	0	2	2	6	Bronze (2018)		
Magnus Goodman	1920	3	3	—	3	—	Gold (1920)	COHOF (2006)	
Marc-André Gragnani	2018	6	0	3	3	2	Bronze (2018)		
Alex Grant	2022	3	1	1	2	2			
Joe Grant	1980	6	0	1	1	2			
Jean Gravelle	1948	7	3	0	3	4	Gold (1948)	COHOF (2008)	
Randy Gregg	1980, 1988	14	2	3	5	10		Team Captain (1980); COHOF (1999)	
Wayne Gretzky	1998	6	0	4	4	2		HHOF (1999); IIHFHOF (2000); CSHOF (2000)	
Patrick Guzzo	1948	8	5	7	12	8	Gold (1948)	COHOF (2008)	
Marc Habscheid	1988	8	5	3	8	6			
Jim Haggerty	1936	3	2	3	5	0	Silver (1936)		
Walter Halder	1948	8	21	8	29	20	Gold (1948)	COHOF (2008)	
Haldor Halderson	1920	3	3	—	3	—	Gold (1920)	COHOF (2006)	
Dan Hamhuis	2014	5	0	0	0	0	Gold (2014)		
Dave Hannan	1992	8	3	5	8	8	Silver (1992)		
Ted Hargreaves	1968	7	1	1	2	0	Bronze (1968)		
David Harlock	1994	8	0	0	0	8	Silver (1994)		
Dany Heatley	2006, 2010	13	6	4	10	12	Gold (2010)		
Thomas Hibberd	1948	8	3	4	7	4	Gold (1948)	COHOF (2008)	
Dave Hindmarch	1980	6	3	4	7	4			
Roy Henkel	1932	6	2	1	3	6	Gold (1932)		
Todd Hlushko	1994	8	5	0	5	6	Silver (1994)		
Josh Ho-Sang	2022	5	0	3	3	2			
Alfred Horne	1956	3	1	0	1	0	Bronze (1956)		
Fran Huck	1968	7	4	5	9	10	Bronze (1968)	IIHFHOF (1999)	
Louis Hudson	1928	3	4	—	4	—	Gold (1928)		
Art Hurst	1956	8	3	3	6	22	Bronze (1956)		
Gord Hynes	1992	8	3	3	6	6	Silver (1992)		
Jarome Iginla	2002–2010	19	10	4	14	4	Gold (2002); Gold (2010)	COHOF (2009); HHOF (2020)	
Konrad Johannesson	1920	3	2	—	2	—	Gold (1920)	COHOF (2006)	
Greg Johnson	1994	8	0	3	3	0	Silver (1994)		
Kent Johnson	2022	5	1	4	5	0			
Marshall Johnston	1964, 1968	14	2	9	11	10	Bronze (1968)	Team Captain (1968); IIHFHOF (1998)	
Fabian Joseph	1992, 1994	16	2	3	5	4	Silver (1992); Silver (1994)	Team Captain (1994)	
Ed Jovanovski	2002	6	0	3	3	4	Gold (2002)	COHOF (2009)	
Bob Joyce	1988	4	1	0	1	0			
Joé Juneau	1992	8	6	9	15	4	Silver (1992)		
Paul Kariya	1994, 2002	14	6	5	11	2	Silver (1994); Gold (2002)	COHOF (2009)	
Vaughn Karpan	1984, 1988	15	0	0	0	2			
Duncan Keith	2010, 2014	13	0	7	7	6	Gold (2010); Gold (2014)		
Chris Kelly	2018	6	2	1	3	0	Bronze (2018)		
Walter Kitchen	1936	6	2	2	4	0	Silver (1936)		
Byrle Klinck	1956	4	0	2	2	4	Bronze (1956)		
Rob Klinkhammer	2018	6	0	2	2	2	Bronze (2018)		
Corban Knight	2022	5	2	1	3	0			
Paul Knox	1956	8	7	7	14	2	Bronze (1956)		
Chris Kontos	1994	8	3	1	4	2	Silver (1994)		
Brandon Kozun	2018	5	0	2	2	2	Bronze (2018)		
Chris Kunitz	2014	6	1	0	1	6	Gold (2014)		
Henri-André Laperriere	1948	8	1	1	2	14	Gold (1948)	COHOF (2008)	
Maxim Lapierre	2018	6	1	0	1	4	Bronze (2018)		
Ken Laufman	1956, 1960	12	1	14	15	4	Bronze (1956); Silver (1960)		
Patrick Lebeau	1992	8	1	3	1	4	Silver (1992)		
Vincent Lecavalier	2006	6	0	3	3	16			
John Lecompte	1948	8	2	3	5	12	Gold (1948)	COHOF (2008)	
Chris Lee	2018	6	0	5	5	0	Bronze (2018)		
Howard Lee	1956	8	2	3	5	12	Bronze (1956)		
Quinton Howden	2018	3	0	1	1	0	Bronze (2018)		
Mario Lemieux	2002	5	2	4	6	0	Gold (2002)	Team Captain (2002); HHOF (1997); CSHOF (1998); IIHFHOF (2008); COHOF (2009)	
Doug Lidster	1984	7	0	2	2	2			
Chris Lindberg	1992	8	1	4	5	4	Silver (1992)		
Trevor Linden	1998	6	1	0	1	10			
Eric Lindros	1992, 1998, 2002	20	8	9	17	16	Silver (1992); Gold (2002)	Team Captain (1998); COHOF (2009)	
James Logan	1956	8	7	8	15	0	Bronze (1956)		
Ken Lovsin	1994	8	0	0	0	8	Silver (1994)		
Darren Lowe	1984	7	2	1	3	0			
Vic Lundquist	1932	5	3	6	9	2	Gold (1932)	IIHFHOF (1997)	
Al MacInnis	1998, 2002	12	2	0	2	10	Gold (2002)	HHOF (2007); COHOF (2009)	
Barry MacKenzie	1964, 1968	14	0	4	4	12	Bronze (1968)	IIHFHOF (1999)	
Paul MacLean	1980	6	2	3	5	6			
Bill MacMillan	1968	6	1	2	3	0	Bronze (1968)		
Merlin Malinowski	1988	8	3	2	5	0			
Norman Malloy	1932	5	3	2	5	4	Gold (1932)		
Kent Manderville	1992	8	1	2	3	0	Silver (1992)		
George Mara	1948	8	17	9	26	6	Gold (1948)	Team Captain (1948); COHOF (1989, 2008); CSHOF (1993)	
Patrick Marleau	2010, 2014	13	2	7	9	2	Gold (2010); Gold (2014)		
Floyd Martin	1956, 1960	15	8	11	19	26	Bronze (1956); Silver (1960)		
Kevin Maxwell	1980	6	0	5	5	4			
Derek Mayer	1994	8	1	2	3	18	Silver (1994)		
Jack McBain	2022	5	1	1	2	2			
Bryan McCabe	2006	6	0	0	0	18			
Bert McCaffrey	1924	5	20	—	20	—	Gold (1924)		
Jack McKenzie	1956	8	7	5	12	9	Bronze (1956)	Team Captain (1956)	
Robert McKnight	1960	3	2	2	4	0	Silver (1960)		
Harold McMunn	1924	5	5	—	5	—	Gold (1924)		
Mason McTavish	2022	5	0	1	1	2			
Robert Meyers	1952	2	2	0	2	0	Gold (1952)	COHOF (2002)	
David Miller	1952	8	10	2	12	2	Gold (1952)	COHOF (2002)	
Raymond Milton	1936	2	0	0	0	0	Silver (1936)		
Walter Monson	1932	6	7	4	11	4	Gold (1932)		
Steve Monteith	1968	7	1	0	1	0	Bronze (1968)		
Kenneth Moore	1932	1	1	0	1	0	Gold (1932)		
Brenden Morrow	2010	7	2	1	3	2	Gold (2010)		
Morris Mott	1968	7	5	1	6	2	Bronze (1968)		
Kirk Muller	1984	6	2	1	3	0			
Dunc Munro	1924	5	16	—	16	2	Gold (1924)	Team Captain (1924)	
Herman Murray	1936	8	5	0	5	2	Silver (1936)	Team Captain (1936)	
Rick Nash	2006–2014	19	2	5	7	12	Gold (2010); Gold (2014)		
Petr Nedvěd	1994	8	5	1	6	6	Silver (1994)		
David Neville	1936	7	8	3	11	6	Silver (1936)		
Scott Niedermayer	2002, 2010	13	2	3	6	8	Gold (2002); Gold (2010)	Team Captain (2010); COHOF (2009); CSHOF (2012); HHOF (2013)	
Joe Nieuwendyk	1998, 2002	12	3	4	7	2	Gold (2002)	COHOF (2009); HHOF (2011)	
Jim Nill	1980	6	1	2	3	4			
Owen Nolan	2002	6	0	3	3	2	Gold (2002)	COHOF (2009)	
Maxim Noreau	2018, 2022	11	3	8	11	0	Bronze (2018)		
Dwayne Norris	1994	8	2	2	4	4	Silver (1994)		
Eric O'Dell	2018, 2022	11	3	4	7	4	Bronze (2018)		
Terry O'Malley	1964, 1968, 1980	19	0	5	5	6	Bronze (1968)	IIHFHOF (1998)	
Danny O'Shea	1968	7	3	2	5	10	Bronze (1968)		
Greg Parks	1994	8	1	2	3	10	Silver (1994)		
James Patrick	1984	7	0	3	3	4			
Michael Peca	2002	6	0	2	2	2	Gold (2002)	COHOF (2009)	
Cliff Pennington	1960	4	0	2	2	6	Silver (1960)		
Jim Peplinski	1988	7	0	1	1	6			
Corey Perry	2010, 2014	13	4	2	6	4	Gold (2010); Gold (2014)		
Alex Pietrangelo	2014	6	0	1	1	0	Gold (2014)		
Gerry Pinder	1968	7	1	0	1	2	Bronze (1968)		
Herb Pinder	1968	2	1	0	1	2	Bronze (1968)		
Brad Pirie	1980	6	1	2	3	2			
Adrien Plavsic	1992	8	0	2	2	0	Silver (1992)		
Herbert Plaxton	1928	1	2	—	2	—	Gold (1928)		
Hugh Plaxton	1928	3	12	—	12	—	Gold (1928)		
Roger Plaxton	1928	1	0	—	0	—	Gold (1928)		
Thomas Pollock	1952	8	2	1	3	6	Gold (1952)	COHOF (2002)	
John Porter	1928	3	3	—	3	—	Gold (1928)	Flag bearer (1928); Team Captain (1928)	
Owen Power	2022	5	0	1	1	2			
Keith Primeau	1998	6	2	1	3	4			
Kevin Primeau	1980	6	4	1	5	6			
Chris Pronger	1998–2010	25	1	8	9	24	Gold (2002); Gold (2010)	COHOF (2009)	
Allan Purvis	1952	8	2	0	2	2	Gold (1952)	COHOF (2002)	
Beattie Ramsay	1924	5	10	—	10	—	Gold (1924)		
Dan Ratushny	1992	8	0	0	0	4	Silver (1992)		
Mason Raymond	2018	6	1	1	2	6	Bronze (2018)		
Mark Recchi	1998	5	0	2	2	0			
Wade Redden	2006	6	1	0	1	0			
Craig Redmond	1984	7	2	0	2	4			
Robyn Regehr	2006	6	0	1	1	2			
Albert Renaud	1948	8	4	10	14	6	Gold (1948)	COHOF (2008)	
Brad Richards	2006	6	2	2	4	6			
Mike Richards	2010	7	2	3	5	0	Gold (2010)		
Romeo Rivers	1932	6	5	3	8	0	Gold (1932)		
Gordon Robertson	1952	8	4	6	10	9	Gold (1952)	COHOF (2002)	
Mat Robinson	2018, 2022	11	2	1	3	0	Bronze (2018)		
Donald Rope	1956, 1960	15	8	5	13	4	Bronze (1956); Silver (1960)		
Bobby Rousseau	1960	7	5	4	9	2	Silver (1960)		
Derek Roy	2018	5	2	5	7	8	Bronze (2018)		
Jean-Yves Roy	1994	8	1	0	1	0	Silver (1994)		
Serge Roy	1988	5	0	7	7	4			
Joe Sakic	1998–2006	16	6	7	13	4	Gold (2002)	Team Captain (2006); COHOF (2009); HHOF (2012); CSHOF (2013)	
George Samolenko	1960	7	8	4	12	0	Silver (1960)		
Brian Savage	1994	8	2	2	4	6	Silver (1994)		
Brad Schlegel	1992, 1994	16	1	2	3	10	Silver (1992); Silver (1994)	Team Captain (1992)	
George Scholes	1956	8	5	5	10	2	Bronze (1956)		
Wally Schreiber	1988–1994	24	4	4	8	6	Silver (1992); Silver (1994)		
Reginald Schroeter	1948	8	12	5	17	2	Gold (1948)	COHOF (2008)	
Brent Seabrook	2010	7	0	1	1	2	Gold (2010)		
Louis Secco	1952	8	2	3	5	2	Gold (1952)	COHOF (2002)	
Rod Seiling	1964	7	4	2	6	4			
Brendan Shanahan	1998, 2002	12	2	1	3	0	Gold (2002)	COHOF (2009); HHOF (2013)	
Patrick Sharp	2014	5	1	0	1	4	Gold (2014)		
Gord Sherven	1988	8	4	2	8	4			
Hack Simpson	1932	5	6	1	7	6	Gold (1932)	Flag bearer (1932)	
Alex Sinclair	1936	5	3	3	6	0	Silver (1936)		
Harry Sinden	1960	7	4	5	9	6	Silver (1960)	Team Captain (1960); HHOF (1983); IIHFHOF (1997); CSHOF (2005)	
Cyril Slater	1924	5	4	—	4	—	Gold (1924)		
Darryl Sly	1960	7	1	1	2	9	Silver (1960)		
Randy Smith	1992	8	1	7	8	4	Silver (1992)		
Reginald Smith	1924	5	18	—	18	4	Gold (1924)	HHOF (1972)	
Ryan Smyth	2002, 2006	12	0	2	2	4	Gold (2002)	COHOF (2009)	
Don Spring	1980	6	0	1	1	0			
Ralph St. Germain	1936	4	6	5	11	0	Silver (1936)		
Martin St. Louis	2006, 2014	11	2	1	3	2	Gold (2014)		
Eric Staal	2006^{[N 4]}, 2010, 2022	12	2	8	10	10	Gold (2010)	Team Captain (2022)	
Scott Stevens	1998	6	0	0	0	2		HHOF (2007)	
Tony Stiles	1988	5	0	0	0	0			
Karl Stollery	2018	4	0	0	0	0	Bronze (2018)		
Ben Street	2022	4	2	1	3	2			
P.K. Subban	2014	1	0	0	0	0	Gold (2014)		
Frank Sullivan	1928	3	2	—	2	—	Gold (1928)		
Francis Sullivan	1952	8	5	5	10	2	Gold (1952)	COHOF (2002)	
Hugh Sutherland	1932	6	1	5	6	4	Gold (1932)		
George Swarbrick	1964	7	3	3	6	2			
Adam Tambellini	2022	5	3	4	7	0			
Steve Tambellini	1988	8	1	3	4	2			
John Tavares	2014	4	0	0	0	0	Gold (2014)		
Irving Taylor	1948	1	0	0	0	0	Gold (1948)	COHOF (2008)	
Ross Taylor	1928	1	2	—	2	—	Gold (1928)		
Gerry Theberge	1956	8	9	2	11	8	Bronze (1956)		
Chris Therien	1994	4	0	0	0	4	Silver (1994)		
Christian Thomas	2018	6	1	1	2	2	Bronze (2018)		
Bill Thomson	1936	8	7	0	7	2	Silver (1936)		
Joe Thornton	2006, 2010	13	2	3	5	0	Gold (2010)		
Dave Tippett	1984, 1992	14	2	3	5	12	Silver (1992)	Team Captain (1984)	
Jonathan Toews	2010, 2014	13	2	9	11	2	Gold (2010); Gold (2014)		
Dave Trottier	1928	3	12	—	12	—	Gold (1928)		
Brian Tutt	1992	8	0	0	0	4	Silver (1992)		
Linden Vey	2018	6	0	1	1	2	Bronze (2018)		
Claude Vilgrain	1988	6	0	0	0	0			
Marc-Édouard Vlasic	2014	6	0	0	0	0	Gold (2014)		
Todd Warriner	1994	4	1	1	2	0	Silver (1994)		
Harry Watson	1924	5	36	—	36	2	Gold (1924)	HHOF (1962); IIHFHOF (1998)	
Bob Watt	1952	8	3	3	6	2	Gold (1952)	COHOF (2002)	
Tim Watters	1980, 1988	14	1	2	3	2			
Jordan Weal	2022	5	3	2	5	6			
Shea Weber	2010, 2014	13	5	7	12	2	Gold (2010); Gold (2014)	HHOF (2024)	
Brad Werenka	1994	8	2	2	4	8	Silver (1994)		
Robert White	1956	8	2	3	5	2	Bronze (1956)		
Carey Wilson	1984	7	3	3	6	6			
Daniel Winnik	2022	5	1	1	2	6			
Aliston Wise	1932	5	2	0	2	0	Gold (1932)		
Wojtek Wolski	2018	6	3	1	4	2	Bronze (2018)		
Dan Wood	1984	7	0	1	1	2			
Allan Woodman	1920	3	1	—	1	—	Gold (1920)	COHOF (2006)	
Jason Woolley	1992	8	0	5	5	4	Silver (1992)		
Tyler Wotherspoon	2022	5	0	2	2	2			
Ken Yaremchuk	1988	8	3	3	6	2			
Trent Yawney	1988	8	1	1	2	6		Team Captain (1988)	
Steve Yzerman	1998, 2002	12	3	5	8	12	Gold (2002)	HHOF (2009); COHOF (2009); IIHFHOF (2014)	
Zarley Zalapski	1988	8	1	3	4	2			
Rob Zamuner	1998	6	1	0	1	8			
Stelio Zupancich	1980	6	1	3	4	2			

=== Reserve skaters ===
These players were named to the Olympic roster, but did not play in any games.

Player	Olympics	Medals	Notes	Ref.
Doug Buchanan	1980			
Hubert Brooks	1948	Gold (1948)^{[Note 1]}	Flag bearer (1948)	
Cary Farelli	1980			
Roy Forbes	1948	Gold (1948)^{[Note 1]}		
Norm Friday	1936	^{[Note 2]}		
Andy Gilpin	1948	Gold (1948)^{[Note 1]}		
Ross King	1948	Gold (1948)^{[Note 1]}		
Rick Kosti	1988			
Roger Lamoureux	1980			
Pete Leichnitz	1948	Gold (1948)^{[Note 1]}		
Ron Paterson	1980			
Shane Pearsal	1980			
Allain Roy	1994	Silver (1994)		
Gus Saxburg	1936	^{[Note 2]}		
Jason Spezza	2006^{[Note 4]}			

Note 1. Sources vary on whether these players received a medal, although the IOC lists them as having received one.
Note 2. That player's team won a medal, although the player is not listed as having received one in the IOC database.
Note 3. Named to the roster, but did not play in any games at the 1998 Winter Olympics
Note 4. Player was named to the 2006 team's taxi squad and took part in team practices, but did not dress for games.

== See also ==
- List of Men's World Ice Hockey Championship players for Canada (1977–present)
- List of IIHF World Under-20 Championship players for Canada
- List of Canadian national ice hockey team rosters
