= List of flag bearers for Canada at the Olympics =

Canada at the Olympics
- IOC code: CAN
- NOC: Canadian Olympic Committee
- Website: www.olympic.ca (in English and French)
- Medals: Gold 157 Silver 189 Bronze 232 Total 578

Summer appearances
- 1900; 1904; 1908; 1912; 1920; 1924; 1928; 1932; 1936; 1948; 1952; 1956; 1960; 1964; 1968; 1972; 1976; 1980; 1984; 1988; 1992; 1996; 2000; 2004; 2008; 2012; 2016; 2020; 2024

Winter appearances
- 1924; 1928; 1932; 1936; 1948; 1952; 1956; 1960; 1964; 1968; 1972; 1976; 1980; 1984; 1988; 1992; 1994; 1998; 2002; 2006; 2010; 2014; 2018; 2022; 2026

Other related appearances
- 1906 Intercalated Games

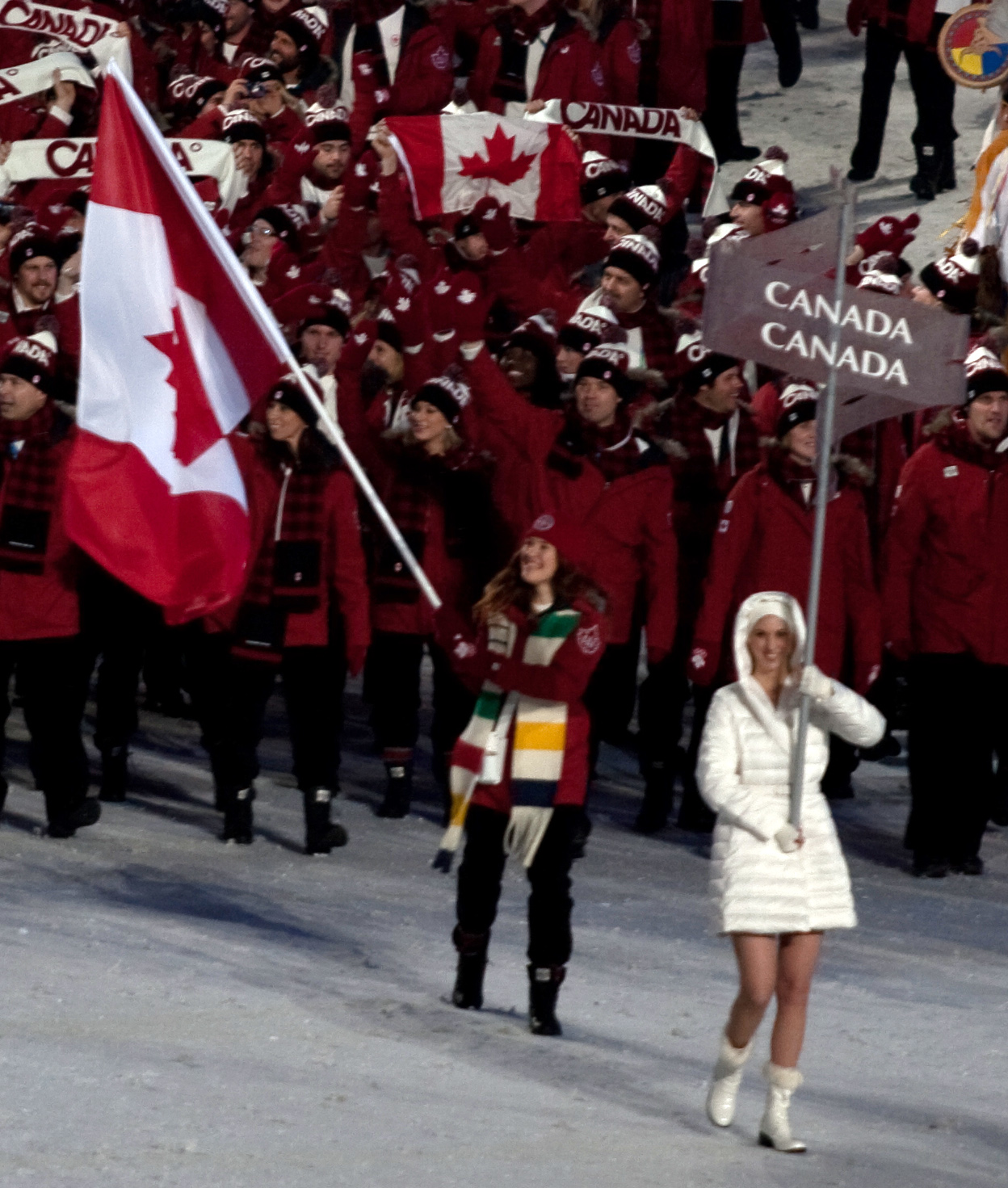
Clara Hughes at the 2010 Winter Olympics

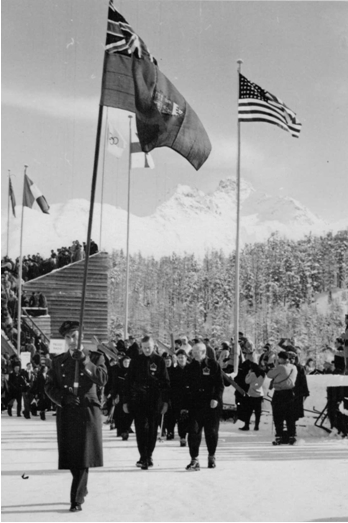
Hubert Brooks at the 1948 Winter Olympics

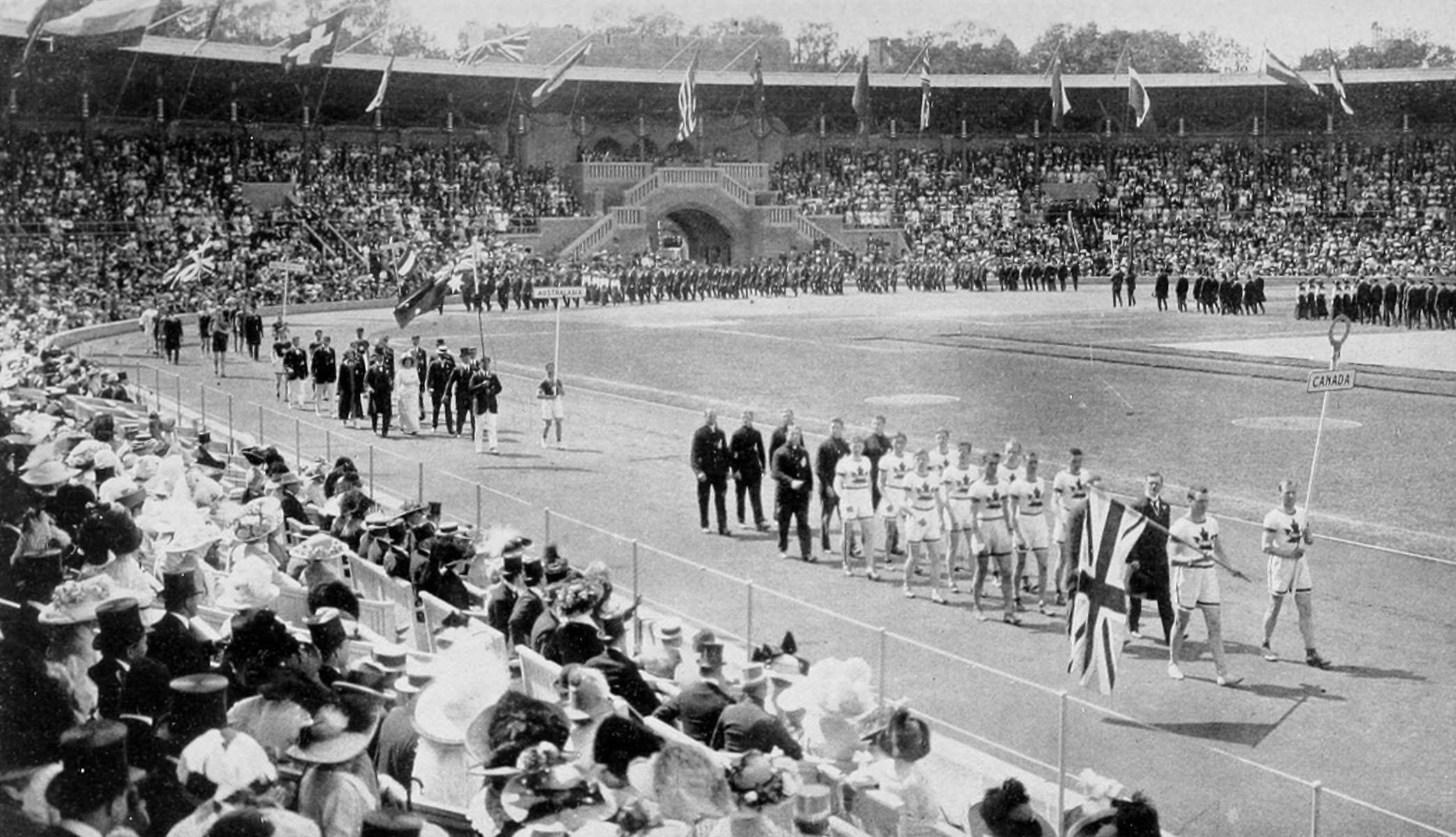
Canada at the 1912 Summer Olympics

This is a list of flag bearers who have represented Canada at the Olympics.

== Opening ceremonies ==
Flag bearers carry the national flag of their country at the opening ceremony of the Olympic Games.

| # | Event year | Season | Flag bearer | Sport | Ref. |
|---|---|---|---|---|---|
| 1 | 1908 | Summer | Ed Archibald | Athletics | |
| 2 | 1912 | Summer | Duncan Gillis | Athletics | |
| (Note: This Olympics was cancelled due to war) | 1916 | Summer | none | Cancelled due to World War I | |
| 3 | 1920 | Summer | Archie McDiarmid | Athletics | |
| 4 | 1924 | Winter | Ernie Collett | Hockey | |
| 5 | 1924 | Summer | Hec Phillips | Athletics | |
| 6 | 1928 | Winter | John Porter | Hockey | |
| 7 | 1928 | Summer | Joseph Wright Jr. | Rowing | |
| 8 | 1932 | Winter | Hack Simpson | Hockey | |
| 9 | 1932 | Summer | George Maughan | Boxing | |
| 10 | 1936 | Winter | Walter Kitchen | Hockey | |
| 11 | 1936 | Summer | Jim Worrall | Athletics | |
| | 1940 | Winter | none | Cancelled due to World War II | |
| | 1940 | Summer | none | Cancelled due to World War II | |
| | 1944 | Winter | none | Cancelled due to World War II | |
| | 1944 | Summer | none | Cancelled due to World War II | |
| 12 | 1948 | Winter | Hubert Brooks | Hockey | |
| 13 | 1948 | Summer | Bob McFarlane | Athletics | |
| 14 | 1952 | Winter | Gordon Audley | Speed skating | |
| 15 | 1952 | Summer | Bill Parnell | Athletics | |
| 16 | 1956 | Winter | Norris Bowden | Figure skating | |
| 17 | 1956 | Summer | Bob Steckle | Wrestling | |
| 18 | 1960 | Winter | Robert Paul | Figure skating | |
| 19 | 1960 | Summer | Carl Schwende | Fencing | |
| 20 | 1964 | Winter | Ralf Olin | Speed skating | |
| 21 | 1964 | Summer | Gil Boa | Shooting | |
| 22 | 1968 | Winter | Nancy Greene | Alpine skiing | |
| 23 | 1968 | Summer | Roger Jackson | Rowing | |
| 24 | 1972 | Winter | Karen Magnussen | Figure skating | |
| 25 | 1972 | Summer | Douglas Rogers | Judo | |
| 26 | 1976 | Winter | Dave Irwin | Alpine skiing | |
| 27 | 1976 | Summer | Abby Hoffman | Athletics | |
| 28 | 1980 | Winter | Ken Read | Alpine skiing | |
| (Note: Canada boycotted this Olympics, so Sue Holloway, although selected, did not participate in the Parade of Nations) | 1980 | Summer | Sue Holloway | Canoe sprint | |
| 29 | 1984 | Winter | Gaétan Boucher | Speed skating | |
| 30 | 1984 | Summer | Alex Baumann | Swimming | |
| 31 | 1988 | Winter | Brian Orser | Figure skating | |
| 32 | 1988 | Summer | Carolyn Waldo | Synchronized swimming | |
| 33 | 1992 | Winter | Sylvie Daigle | Short track speed skating | |
| 34 | 1992 | Summer | Mike Smith | Athletics | |
| 35 | 1994 | Winter | Kurt Browning | Figure skating | |
| 36 | 1996 | Summer | Charmaine Crooks | Athletics | |
| 37 | 1998 | Winter | Jean-Luc Brassard | Freestyle skiing | |
| 38 | 2000 | Summer | Caroline Brunet | Kayak racing | |
| 39 | 2002 | Winter | Catriona Le May Doan | Speed skating | |
| 40 | 2004 | Summer | Nicolas Gill | Judo | |
| 41 | 2006 | Winter | Danielle Goyette | Hockey | |
| 42 | 2008 | Summer | Adam van Koeverden | Kayaking | |
| 43 | 2010 | Winter | Clara Hughes | Speed skating | |
| 44 | 2012 | Summer | Simon Whitfield | Triathlon | |
| 45 | 2014 | Winter | Hayley Wickenheiser | Hockey | |
| 46 | 2016 | Summer | Rosannagh MacLennan | Gymnastics | |
| 47 | 2018 | Winter | Tessa Virtue | Figure skating | |
| 47 | 2018 | Winter | Scott Moir | Figure skating | |
| 48 | 2020 | Summer | Miranda Ayim | Basketball | |
| 48 | 2020 | Summer | Nathan Hirayama | Rugby sevens | |
| 49 | 2022 | Winter | Marie-Philip Poulin | Hockey | |
| 49 | 2022 | Winter | Charles Hamelin | Short track speed skating | |
| 50 | 2024 | Summer | Maude Charron | Weightlifting | |
| 50 | 2024 | Summer | Andre De Grasse | Athletics | |
| 51 | 2026 | Winter | Mikaël Kingsbury | Freestyle skiing | |
| 51 | 2026 | Winter | Marielle Thompson | Freestyle skiing | |

== Closing ceremonies ==
Flag bearers carry the national flag of their country at the closing ceremony of the Olympic Games.

| # | Event year | Season | Flag bearer | Sport | Ref |
|---|---|---|---|---|---|
| ? | 1952 | Winter | | | |
| ? | 1952 | Summer | | | |
| 17 | 1956 | Winter | André Bertrand | Alpine skiing | |
| ? | 1956 | Summer | | | |
| 19 | 1960 | Winter | Robert Paul | Figure skating | |
| 20 | 1960 | Summer | Sig Ohlemann | Athletics | |
| ? | 1964 | Winter | | | |
| ? | 1964 | Summer | | | |
| ? | 1968 | Winter | | | |
| 24 | 1968 | Summer | Ralph Hutton | Swimming | |
| ? | 1972 | Winter | | | |
| 26 | 1972 | Summer | Jim Elder | Equestrian | |
| 27 | 1976 | Winter | Cathy Priestner | Speed skating | |
| 28 | 1976 | Summer | Greg Joy | Athletics | |
| 29 | 1980 | Winter | Sylvia Burka | Speed skating | |
| (Note: As Canada boycotted this Olympics, no flagbearer was selected.) | 1980 | Summer | none | Canada boycotted this Olympics | |
| 30 | 1984 | Winter | Robert Wilson | Bobsleigh | |
| 31 | 1984 | Summer | Linda Thom | Shooting | |
| 32 | 1988 | Winter | Karen Percy | Alpine skiing | |
| 33 | 1988 | Summer | Lennox Lewis | Boxing | |
| 34 | 1992 | Winter | Nathalie Lambert | Short track speed skating | |
| 24 | 1992 | Summer | Silken Laumann | Rowing | |
| 35 | 1994 | Winter | Myriam Bedard | Biathlon | |
| 36 | 1996 | Summer | Marnie McBean | Rowing | |
| 36 | 1996 | Summer | Kathleen Heddle | Rowing | |
| 37 | 1998 | Winter | Catriona Le May Doan | Speed skating | |
| 38 | 2000 | Summer | Simon Whitfield | Triathlon | |
| 39 | 2002 | Winter | Jamie Salé | Figure skating | |
| 39 | 2002 | Winter | David Pelletier | Figure skating | |
| 40 | 2004 | Summer | Adam van Koeverden | Kayak racing | |
| 41 | 2006 | Winter | Cindy Klassen | Speed skating | |
| 42 | 2008 | Summer | Karen Cockburn | Trampolining | |
| 43 | 2010 | Winter | Joannie Rochette | Figure skating | |
| 44 | 2012 | Summer | Christine Sinclair | Football (soccer) | |
| 45 | 2014 | Winter | Kaillie Humphries | Bobsleigh | |
| 45 | 2014 | Winter | Heather Moyse | Bobsleigh | |
| 46 | 2016 | Summer | Penny Oleksiak | Swimming | |
| 47 | 2018 | Winter | Kim Boutin | Short track speed skating | |
| 48 | 2020 | Summer | Damian Warner | Decathlon | |
| 49 | 2022 | Winter | Isabelle Weidemann | Long-track speed skating | |
| 50 | 2024 | Summer | Ethan Katzberg | Athletics | |
| 50 | 2024 | Summer | Summer McIntosh | Swimming | |

== See also ==
- Canada at the Olympics
