= Snows of Aorangi =

1955 NZ Academy Award nominated short film

- Directed by: Brian Brake
- Written by: James K Baxter
- Produced by: Cyril Morton; Geoffrey Scott
- Narrated by: William Austin
- Cinematography: Brian Brake
- Production company: National Film Unit
- Release date: 1955
- Running time: 19 min.
- Country: New Zealand
- Language: English

Snows of Aorangi is a 1955 New Zealand short documentary film about New Zealand's mountain landscapes. It was nominated for an Academy Award for Short Subject (Live Action) at the 31st Academy Awards.

Three champion skiers are shown descending the slopes of Aoraki / Mount Cook.

== Cast ==
- Hans Bohny - Skier
- Harvey Clifford - Skier
- Peter Lawlor - Skier
