= Laurent Bernier =

Canadian ski jumper

Laurent Bernier (28 December 1921 – 13 August 2007) was a Canadian ski jumper who competed in the 1948 Winter Olympics.
