= Tom Dennie =

Canadian cross-country skier

Tom Dennie (17 September 1922 – 10 February 2009) was a Canadian cross-country skier who competed in the 1948 Winter Olympics.
