= Ab Hardy =

Canadian speed skater

Personal information
- Born: October 6, 1909; Mullingar, Saskatchewan, Canada
- Died: December 20, 2002 (aged 93); Kelowna, British Columbia, Canada

Sport
- Country: Canada
- Sport: Speed skating

Albert Edward "Ab" Hardy (October 6, 1909 – December 20, 2002) was a Canadian speed skater who competed at the 1948 Winter Olympics.
