= Charles Brooker =

Charles Brooker may refer to:

- Charles F. Brooker (1847–1926), American politician and business executive from Connecticut
- Charlie Brooker (ice hockey) (1932–2020), Canadian ice hockey player
- Charlie Brooker (born 1971), English screenwriter, producer, and critic
