= Harvey Clifford =

Canadian alpine skier (1926–1982)

Personal information
- Born: 18 September 1926 Oak Point, Manitoba, Canada
- Died: 13 January 1982 (aged 55)

Sport
- Sport: Alpine skiing

Harvey Clifford (18 September 1926 – 13 January 1982) was a Canadian alpine skier and ski coach.

== Life and career ==
Clifford grew up in Ottawa, Canada and was educated at Glebe Collegiate Institute where he was head boy. He competed in three events at the 1948 Winter Olympics. He coached Canada's skiing teams for the FIS Alpine World Ski Championships 1950 and the 1952 Winter Olympics. He was inducted into the Ottawa Sport Hall of Fame. His skiing on Aoraki / Mount Cook, was in the Academy Award nominated for Short Subject (Live Action) film Snows of Aorangi (1955).

Clifford worked for eight years as the president of the Mount Snow ski resort in Vermont, and later worked in that same capacity for a ski development on Stratton Mountain for seven years. In November 1981 he underwent surgery for a brain tumor. He died on 13 January 1982.
