= Jean Gravelle =

Canadian ice hockey player

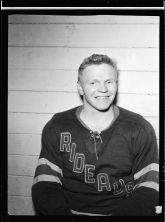
- Gravelle in Rideaus jersey (1953)
- Born: December 7, 1927; Aylmer, Quebec, Canada
- Died: January 18, 1997 (aged 69) near Trenton, Ontario, Canada
- Height: 5 ft 6 in (168 cm)
- Weight: 150 lb (68 kg; 10 st 10 lb)
- National team: Canada

Olympic medal record

Men's ice hockey

Representing Canada
Gold medal – first place	1948 St. Moritz	Ice hockey

Israel Jean Orval Gravelle, sometimes referred to as Orville ‘Red’ Gravelle, (December 7, 1927 - January 18, 1997) was a Canadian ice hockey player. Gravelle was drafted by the New York Rangers in 1946, playing at four Broadway Blueshirts training camps, but never played in the NHL. Not playing for the Rangers left him eligible for the 1948 Winter Olympics in St. Moritz, where and he won gold Canadian team. He was also a member of the Ottawa RCAF Flyers who won the gold medal in ice hockey for Canada at the . Gravelle died in 1997 while unsuccessfully attempting to rescue his dog from the path of an on-coming train. In keeping with his wishes, he was buried with his skates.
