= Pete Leichnitz =

Canadian ice hockey player

- Born: July 28, 1926 Ottawa, Ontario, Canada
- Died: November 19, 2011 (aged 85) London, Ontario, Canada
- Position: Forward
- National team: Canada
- Playing career: 1946–1948

Olympic medal record

Men's ice hockey

Representing Canada
Gold medal – first place	1948 St. Moritz	Ice hockey

Julius Karl "Pete" Leichnitz (July 28, 1926 – November 19, 2011), sometimes referred to as J.K. Leitchnitz, was a Canadian ice hockey player. He was a member of the Ottawa RCAF Flyers who won the gold medal in ice hockey for Canada at the 1948 Winter Olympics in St. Moritz.

The 1948 Winter Olympics were to be held in St. Moritz, Switzerland. They were then officially known as the V Olympic Winter Games as they were the first Olympic games to be celebrated after World War II. In the fall of 1947, the Canadian Amateur Hockey Association invited the RCAF to form Canada's Olympic ice hockey squad.

Although Leichnitz traveled to St. Moritz as a member of Canada national hockey team, due to tournament rules that allowed teams to dress only twelve players, Leichnitz was a used as a reserve and did not get into game play during the 1948 Olympics. Nonetheless, Leichnitz was a member of the team that won Canada's first gold medal in Olympic hockey since 1932, and he was given an Olympic Gold Medal.

== Honours ==
In 2001 Leichnitz was honoured by the Canadian Forces when it was announced that the 1948 RCAF Flyers were selected as Canada's greatest military athletes of the 20th century.
