= Ted Hibberd =

Canadian ice hockey player

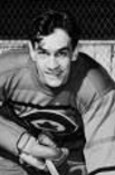
- Born: April 22, 1926 Ottawa, Ontario, Canada
- Died: May 10, 2017 (aged 91) Ottawa, Ontario, Canada
- Height: 5 ft 6 in (168 cm)
- Weight: 150 lb (68 kg; 10 st 10 lb)
- National team: Canada
- Playing career: 1944–1951
Medal record
Men's ice hockey
Representing Canada
Gold medal – first place	1948 St. Moritz	Ice hockey

Thomas Edward Hibberd (April 22, 1926 – May 10, 2017) was a Canadian ice hockey player. He was a member of the Ottawa RCAF Flyers who won the gold medal in ice hockey for Canada at the 1948 Winter Olympics in St. Moritz. In 2001 Hibberd was honoured by the Canadian Forces when it was announced that the 1948 RCAF Flyers were selected as Canada's greatest military athletes of the 20th century. He died on May 10, 2017, at the age of 91.
