= Hubert Brooks =

Canadian ice hockey player

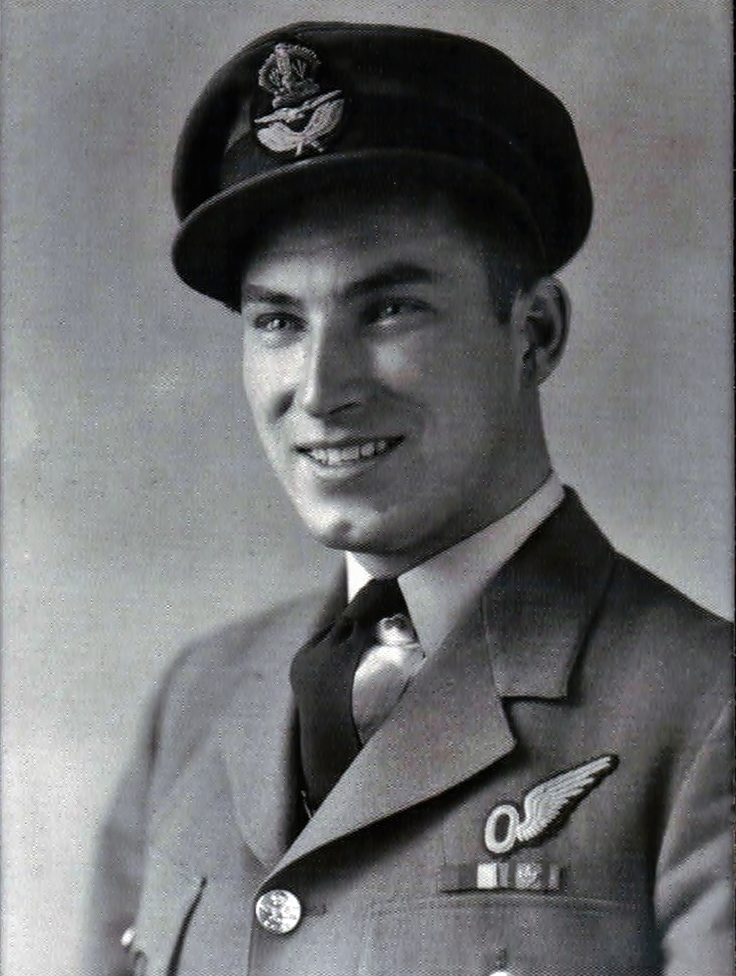
- Hubert Brooks in an RCAF uniform, date unknown
- Born: December 29, 1921 Bluesky, Alberta, Canada
- Died: February 1, 1984 (aged 62) Ottawa, Ontario, Canada
- National team: Canada
- Playing career: 1948–1948

Hubert Brooks MC (December 29, 1921 – February 1, 1984) was a Canadian RCAF officer and ice hockey player who won a gold medal at the 1948 Winter Olympics in St. Moritz. He joined the RCAF in 1940 and served during World War II, being shot down during his second mission over Germany in 1942. He was taken as a prisoner of war to Stalag VIII-B, from where he tried several unsuccessful escape attempts prior to making it to occupied Poland and joining the Polish Underground State as a guerrilla. He rose through the ranks of the rebel force, undertaking raids and assassinations against the Nazi occupation until the end of the conflict. He was one of only five RCAF members to receive the Military Cross for his actions and his award carried the longest citation of them all.

Brooks returned to Canada by way of Russia in 1945, and worked for the Missing Research and Enquiry Service for two years. He was then selected to join the Ottawa RCAF Flyers, who represented Canada at the 1948 Winter Olympics and captured the gold medal in the ice hockey tournament. After a series of exhibition games in Europe, he returned to Canada and entered military intelligence, serving at various posts until 1971, at which point he retired to take up an administrative position at the University of Ottawa. He died in 1984 and one of the student dorms, the Brooks Residence, is named in his honour.

== Early life ==
Brooks was born on December 29, 1921, in Bluesky, Alberta. During the Great Depression, his family moved out of the prairie provinces to Ottawa and Montreal, where he received an education in French and first learned to play ice hockey. In July 1940, he applied to join the Royal Canadian Air Force and was accepted that August into the special reserve at the rank of Air Craftsman 2. The "special reserve" was created at the onset of World War II as a section whose members could be terminated at any time, so that the force could easily return to its pre-conflict size at the end of hostilities.

Brooks trained in Brandon, Manitoba through October prior to being sent to a Winnipeg equipment depot to serve as a guard. He then undertook several training phases across the country in Regina, Saskatchewan, London, Toronto, Malton, and Fingal, Ontario, and finally Rivers, Manitoba, prior to graduating in August 1941 as a navigator – bomb aimer. Arriving in Britain at the end of September, he was sent to RAF Kinloss the following month and trained there until February 1942, when he joined the RCAF's 419 Bomber Squadron. On April 8–9, during only his second mission, he was shot down during a bombing raid and landed near Oldenburg, Germany, where he was quickly taken as a prisoner of war and sent to Dulag Luft.

== Activities in Germany and Poland ==
Brooks arrived in Stalag VIII-B in April 1942, and switched identities with a New Zealand army private, Frederick Cole, so that he would be available to be placed on work detail (members of the air force were not permitted to be part of working parties). In June he was able to escape from a coal-mining work camp with an Irish soldier, and fled to occupied Poland, but was soon captured in Kraków and returned to Stalag VIII-B by the end of the month. He was sentenced to two weeks of solitary confinement, but retained his secret identity.

By September, Brooks was back at a work camp, this time in Svitavy in the Sudetenland. He escaped that month with five other men, this time making it to Lüneburg inside a coal train prior to his recapture. Sent to a prisoner of war camp near Wiener Neustadt, he once more tried to escape but failed, suffered a severe beating at the hands of the Germans, and was again sent back to Stalag VIII-B for two weeks of solitary confinement. Working as a truck helper from a saw mill in Toszek, he slowly acquired maps of Europe and the surrounding region as well as contact information for the Polish Underground State. Having escaped twice already, he risked transfer to a special punishment camp if caught again but, nevertheless, he fled his detention once more, this time with a Scottish soldier by the name of John Duncan, in May 1943.

The duo was eventually smuggled into occupied Poland where they contacted the Polish Underground in Częstochowa and joined the guerrilla movement Armia Krajowa. Posing as a Polish laborer working in a jam factory, he served on patrols, raided food convoys, and assassinated members of the Gestapo during a probationary period. After the camp was attacked in December, which not only killed several resistance members but also caused a split in the group, the reduced force continued its operations until February 1944, when retaliation for a raid on a police garrison lowered their membership to a critical point.

By March, however, Brooks' unit had grown to 110 men and he was promoted to second lieutenant and put in charge of a band of 40 soldiers, including Duncan. His guerrilla activities expanded to include larger raids, reprisal attacks, and the assassination of more important members of the Nazi regime. He would later earn the Polish Cross of Valor for helping lead over 100 of his men out of a German encirclement to safety without a single casualty. He made his way to the Russian front line in January 1945, and was eventually transferred from Lviv to Odessa, Port Said, Cairo, and finally London, where he arrived in March 1945.

Promoted to the rank of warrant officer during his tenure as a prisoner of war, Brooks was informed upon his arrival that his father had died in May of the previous year. He returned to Canada in June. He was awarded the Military Cross for his actions during the conflict, as well several other campaign and achievement medals such as the 1967 Canadian Centennial Medal and the silver Polish Cross of Merit with Swords. He was one of only five RCAF members to receive the Military Cross during World War II (as it is primarily granted to soldiers serving in Army units) and his citation was the longest.

== MRES and 1948 Winter Olympics ==
Olympic medal record

Men's ice hockey Competitor for Canada
Gold medal – first place	1948 St. Moritz	Ice hockey

Eventually promoted to temporary flying officer, Brooks began working for the Missing Research and Enquiry Service (MRES), which was an initiative to locate individuals from the Commonwealth of Nations who were missing or killed in action during World War II over hostile territory. He worked with the service for nearly two years, from November 1945 through July 1947, as a Search Officer in Denmark, Norway, and as a Section Leader in the American Zone of Germany. Brooks and a colleague sailed a fishing smack around Cape Nordkinn in the Arctic Circle, the most northerly coastal point of the mainland of Europe, in the search for missing airmen. It was during his tenure with MRES that he met his wife Birthe. He also played ice hockey during his downtime in Scandinavia with the U.S. Army Allstars, and was selected to be a member of Canada's national delegation to the 1948 Winter Olympics. This squad, known as the Ottawa RCAF Flyers, consisted entirely of members of the Royal Canadian Air Force.

The team's first exhibition game, a 7–0 defeat for the Flyers against the McGill Redmen, led to calls for the squad being scrapped and replaced with collegiate players. After a subsequent 6–2 loss against the Army, several players from the Ottawa New Edinburghs were added to the lineup and, by the time that the team was set to depart for St. Moritz, ten of the original eighteen members had been replaced, although Brooks remained.

In the end the Canadians captured the gold medal at the Olympic tournament. Although Brooks remained a reserve player and did not see any time on the ice, he did receive a gold medal and was selected to be his nation's flag bearer during the opening ceremonies. On February 9, the day after the final, he was finally afforded the opportunity to marry his fiancée Birthe in a ceremony that included Barbara Ann Scott, the Canadian Olympic gold medalist in figure skating, as a bridesmaid. He then joined the rest of the squad on an exhibition series across Europe, winning thirty-four and drawing five of forty-four games prior to returning to Canada in April. Brooks, along with the rest of the Flyers, was inducted into the Canadian Olympic Hall of Fame in 2008.

== Later life ==
Following the Olympics, Brooks returned to the RCAF to work in the field of military intelligence. He was first posted in the Maritimes in 1954, and stayed there for several years until heading to Paris, France to be a staff officer at Supreme Headquarters Allied Powers Europe (SHAPE). He then returned to Canada to work at an RCAF station in Moisie, Quebec from 1965 through 1967, as the first fully bilingual RCAF officer. From there he served at the Canadian Armed Forces Headquarters in Ottawa from 1967 through 1971, during which time he was sent to assess the severity of Quebec's 1970 October Crisis. Following his 1971 retirement from the Armed Forces, he took up a position as an administrator at the University of Ottawa, eventually rising to the position of Housing Director. Brooks died on February 1, 1984, of a heart attack while sitting at his desk. Four years later, the university named one of the student residences in his honour.
