= Andy Gilpin =

Canadian ice hockey player

- Born: September 30, 1920 Montreal, Quebec, Canada
- Died: March 1, 2014 (aged 93) London, Ontario, Canada
- Height: 5 ft 11 in (180 cm)
- Weight: 170 lb (77 kg; 12 st 2 lb)
- National team: Canada
- Playing career: ?–?
Medal record
Men's ice hockey
Representing Canada
Gold medal – first place	1948 St. Moritz	Ice hockey

Andrew Crowley Gilpin (September 30, 1920 – March 1, 2014) was a Canadian ice hockey forward. Born in Montreal, Quebec, he was a member of the Ottawa RCAF Flyers who won the gold medal in ice hockey for Canada at the 1948 Winter Olympics in St. Moritz. Gilpin played Junior A hockey in Montreal. He joined the Royal Canadian Air Force (RCAF), and in March 1947 he was transferred to the RCAF station in the "hockey crazy" town of Whitehorse, Yukon.

The 1948 Winter Olympics were to be held in St. Moritz, Switzerland. They were then officially known as the V Olympic Winter Games as they were the first Olympic games to be celebrated after World War II. In the fall of 1947, the Canadian Amateur Hockey Association invited the RCAF to form Canada's Olympic ice hockey squad, and in January 1948 Gilpin was selected to be a member of Canada men's national ice hockey team – the Ottawa RCAF Flyers. Although Gilpin traveled to St. Moritz as a member of Canada national hockey team. Nonetheless, Gilpin was a member of the team that won Canada's first gold medal in Olympic hockey since 1932, and he was given an Olympic Gold Medal.

After the Olympic Games, the Ottawa RCAF Flyers went on an extensive exhibition tour of Europe, playing in front of crowds reaching 20,000 (as they did in Paris). The RCAF Flyers won 31 of the 42 post-Olympic games played. Upon returning to Canada with a gold medal around his neck, Gilpin and the other team members were greeted with a ticker-tape parade in Ottawa. During the 1948–49 season, Gilpin played for the RCAF Flyers in the Whitehorse Senior Men's League. He died in 2014 at the age of 93.

== Honours ==
In 2001 Gilpin was honoured by the Canadian Forces when it was announced that the 1948 RCAF Flyers were selected as Canada's greatest military athletes of the 20th century.
