= Ross King (ice hockey) =

Canadian ice hockey player (1919–1972)

Personal information
- Full name: Ross Hartford King
- Born: February 19, 1919 Portage la Prairie, Manitoba, Canada
- Died: June 6, 1972 (aged 53) Portage la Prairie, Manitoba, Canada
- Weight: 155 lb (70 kg)

Sport
- Country: Canada
- Sport: Ice hockey
Medal record
Men's ice hockey
Representing Canada
| Gold medal – first place | 1948 St. Moritz | Ice hockey |

Ross Hartford King (February 19, 1919 – June 6, 1972) was a Canadian ice hockey goaltender. He was a member of the Ottawa RCAF Flyers who won the gold medal in ice hockey for Canada at the 1948 Winter Olympics in St. Moritz.

== Career ==
King was a star goaltender with the Portage la Prairie Terriers when they won the Memorial Cup in 1942. King joined the Royal Canadian Air Force (RCAF), and in March 1947 he was transferred to the RCAF station in Whitehorse, Yukon.

The 1948 Winter Olympics were to be held in St. Moritz, Switzerland. They were then officially known as the V Olympic Winter Games as they were the first Olympic games to be celebrated after World War II. In the fall of 1947, the Canadian Amateur Hockey Association invited the Ottawa RCAF Flyers to form Canada's Olympic ice hockey squad. In January 1948, King was selected to be a member of the Canadian national team.

Although King traveled to St. Moritz as a member of the Canada men's national ice hockey team, due to tournament rules that allowed teams to dress only twelve players, King was a used as a reserve and did not get into game play during the 1948 Olympics. Nonetheless, King was a member of the team that won Canada's first gold medal in Olympic hockey since 1932, and he was given an Olympic gold medal.

After the Olympic Games, the Ottawa RCAF Flyers went on an extensive exhibition tour of Europe, playing in front of crowds reaching 20,000 (as they did in Paris). King became the regular goalie during the post-Olympics exhibition tour, and the RCAF Flyers won 31 of the 42 games played. Upon returning to Canada with a gold medal around his neck, King and the other team members were greeted with a ticker-tape parade in Ottawa.

During the 1948–49 season, King played for the RCAF Flyers in the Whitehorse Senior Men's League.

== Personal life ==
After retiring from hockey, King returned to Portage la Prairie, where he settled with his wife Joyce and two children, David and Janet. He died in 1972.
