= Frank Dunster =

Canadian ice hockey player (1921–1995)

- Born: March 24, 1921 Ottawa, Ontario, Canada
- Died: April 8, 1995 (aged 74) Ottawa, Ontario, Canada
- Height: 5 ft 9 in (175 cm)
- Weight: 160 lb (73 kg; 11 st 6 lb)
- Position: Defence
- National team: Canada

Olympic medal record

Men's ice hockey

Representing Canada
Gold medal – first place	1948 St. Moritz	Ice hockey

Bernard Francis Dunster (March 24, 1921 – April 8, 1995) was a Canadian ice hockey player. He was a member of the Ottawa RCAF Flyers who won the gold medal in ice hockey for Canada at the 1948 Winter Olympics in St. Moritz. He died in Ottawa in 1995.
