= Louis Lecompte =

Canadian ice hockey player

Olympic medal record

Men's ice hockey

Representing Canada
Gold medal – first place	1948 St. Moritz	Ice hockey

John Howard Louis Lecompte (July 28, 1914 – February 21, 1970) was a Canadian ice hockey player. He was a member of the Ottawa RCAF Flyers who won the gold medal in ice hockey for Canada at the 1948 Winter Olympics in St. Moritz.
