= Roy Forbes (ice hockey) =

Canadian ice hockey player (1922–2017)

Personal information
- Born: April 6, 1922 Portage la Prairie, Manitoba, Canada
- Died: April 12, 2017 (aged 95) Kelowna, British Columbia, Canada
- Height: 5 ft 6 in (1.68 m)
- Weight: 155 lb (70 kg)

Sport
- Country: Canada
- Sport: Ice hockey
Medal record
Men's ice hockey
Representing Canada
Gold medal – first place	1948 St. Moritz	Ice hockey

Roy Austin Forbes (April 6, 1922 – April 12, 2017) was a Canadian ice hockey player best known for being part of the Ottawa RCAF Flyers team that captured the gold medal for Canada in ice hockey at the 1948 Winter Olympics in St. Moritz.

== Career ==
The 1948 Winter Olympics took place in St. Moritz, Switzerland, and were officially recognized as the "V Olympic Winter Games," the first to be held after World War II. In late 1947, the Canadian Amateur Hockey Association asked the Royal Canadian Air Force (RCAF) to assemble Canada's Olympic ice hockey team. Forbes traveled to St. Moritz as part of the national team, but because tournament regulations allowed only twelve players to dress per game, he served as a reserve and didn’t participate in any matches. Despite this, he was part of the squad that secured Canada's first Olympic hockey gold since 1932 and was awarded a gold medal for his role on the team.

== Honours ==
In 2001, Roy Forbes was honored by the Canadian Forces when the 1948 RCAF Flyers, his Olympic gold medal–winning team, were named Canada's greatest military athletes of the 20th century, a prestigious recognition that celebrated not only their athletic achievement but also their representation of Canada on the world stage following World War II. Many years later, on March 6, 2017, Forbes was invited to participate in a special pregame ceremony at the MTS Centre in Winnipeg, ahead of an NHL matchup between the Winnipeg Jets and the San Jose Sharks. During the ceremony, he performed the ceremonial puck drop at center ice, symbolizing his lasting impact on Canadian hockey history. As he stepped onto the ice, the entire arena rose to its feet, delivering a heartfelt standing ovation in tribute to his legacy as both a decorated athlete and a proud representative of Canada's military heritage.
