= Canada at the 1980 Winter Olympics =

- IOC code: CAN
- NOC: Canadian Olympic Committee
- Website: www.olympic.ca (in English and French)

in Lake Placid, United States 13 February 1980 – 24 February 1980
- Competitors: 59 (41 men, 18 women) in 8 sports
- Flag bearer: Ken Read (alpine skiing)
- Medals Ranked 14th: Gold 0 Silver 1 Bronze 1 Total 2

Winter Olympics appearances (overview)
- 1924; 1928; 1932; 1936; 1948; 1952; 1956; 1960; 1964; 1968; 1972; 1976; 1980; 1984; 1988; 1992; 1994; 1998; 2002; 2006; 2010; 2014; 2018; 2022; 2026

Canada competed at the 1980 Winter Olympics in Lake Placid, United States. Canada had competed at every Winter Olympic Games previously.

== Medalists ==
Medal	Name	Sport	Event
Silver	Gaétan Boucher	Speed skating	Men's 1000m
Bronze	Steve Podborski	Alpine skiing	Men's downhill

== Alpine skiing ==
Men

Athlete	Event	Race	
Athlete	Event	Time	Rank
Ken Read	Downhill	DNF	–
Dave Irwin	Downhill	1:48.12	11
Dave Murray	Downhill	1:47.95	10
Steve Podborski	Downhill	1:46.62	3rd place, bronze medalist(s)

Women

Athlete	Event	Race 1		Race 2		Total	
Athlete	Event	Time	Rank	Time	Rank	Time	Rank
Loni Klettl	Downhill					1:40.95	13
Laurie Graham	Downhill					1:40.74	11
Kathy Kreiner	Downhill					1:39.53	5
Kathy Kreiner	Giant Slalom	1:17.19	11	1:28.56	9	2:45.75	9
Kathy Kreiner	Slalom	48.06	21	46.72	15	1:34.78	15

== Bobsleigh ==
Sled	Athletes	Event	Run 1		Run 2		Run 3		Run 4		Total	
Sled	Athletes	Event	Time	Rank	Time	Rank	Time	Rank	Time	Rank	Time	Rank
CAN-1	Joey Kilburn; Robert Wilson	Two-man	1:04.07	14	1:04.27	12	1:03.96	14	1:03.91	11	4:16.21	13
CAN-2	Brian Vachon; Serge Cantin	Two-man	1:04.66	18	1:04.67	16	1:04.38	17	1:05.05	19	4:18.76	20

Sled	Athletes	Event	Run 1		Run 2		Run 3		Run 4		Total	
Sled	Athletes	Event	Time	Rank	Time	Rank	Time	Rank	Time	Rank	Time	Rank
CAN-1	Martin Glynn; Alan MacLachlan; Serge Cantin; Robert Wilson	Four-man	1:01.76	15	1:02.25	17	DNF	–	–	–	DNF	–

== Cross-country skiing ==
Women

Event	Athlete	Race	
Event	Athlete	Time	Rank
5 km	Sharon Firth	16:54.66	35
5 km	Angela Schmidt-Foster	16:28.87	29
5 km	Shirley Firth	16:23.40	28
5 km	Joan Groothuysen	16:23.25	27
10 km	Joan Groothuysen	33:31.99	34
10 km	Esther Miller	33:29.03	33
10 km	Shirley Firth	32:56.87	24
10 km	Angela Schmidt-Foster	32:56.13	23

Women's 4 × 5 km relay

Athletes	Race	
Athletes	Time	Rank
Angela Schmidt-Foster; Shirley Firth; Esther Miller; Joan Groothuysen	1'07:45.75	8

== Figure skating ==
Men

Athlete	CF	SP	FS	Points	Places	Rank
Brian Pockar	12	12	12	16326	107	12

Women

Athlete	CF	SP	FS	Points	Places	Rank
Heather Kemkaran	16	12	15	164.64	128	15

Pairs

Athletes	SP	FS	Points	Places	Rank
Barbara Underhill; Paul Martini	9	9	129.36	78	9

Ice Dancing

Athletes	CD	FD	Points	Places	Rank
Lorna Wighton; John Dowding	6	6	193.80	54	6

== Ice hockey ==
=== First Round - Red Division ===
Team advanced to the Final Round
Team advanced to Consolation Round

Team	GP	W	L	T	GF	GA	Pts
Soviet Union	5	5	0	0	51	11	10
Finland	5	3	2	0	26	18	6
Canada	5	3	2	0	28	12	6
Poland	5	2	3	0	15	23	4
Netherlands	5	1	3	1	16	43	3
Japan	5	0	4	1	7	36	1

All times are local (UTC-5).

12 February 1980; 13:30	Netherlands	1 – 10 (1–2, 0–2, 0–6)	Canada	Olympic Fieldhouse, Lake Placid

Referee:
Lindgren

de Graauw (de Cloe) (SH) - 01:56	1 – 0
	1 – 1	04:04 - Primeau (Devaney)
	1 – 2	11:40 - Berry (Maxwell, O'Malley)
	1 – 3	26:52 - d'Alvise (O'Malley)
	1 – 4	35:02 - Hindmarch (Devaney) (PP)
	1 – 5	43:31 - G. Anderson (Davidson, Nill)
	1 – 6	44:14 - d'Alvise (Zupancich, Pirie)
	1 – 7	50:35 - Devaney (Primeau, Hindmarch) (PP)
	1 – 8	51:11 - Berry (Watters, Maxwell)
	1 – 9	52:22 - Berry (Maxwell, MacLean)
	1 – 10	58:11 - Hindmarch (MacLean, Davidson)

16 min
Penalties
18 min
20
Shots
40

14 February 1980; 17:00	Poland	1 – 5 (0–1, 1–2, 0–2)	Canada	Olympic Fieldhouse, Lake Placid

Referee:
Kompalla

	0 – 1	03:17 - Zupancich (Pirie, d'Alvise)
Jobczyk (Zabawa) - 23:17	1 – 1
	1 – 2	30:56 - Watters (G. Anderson, Spring)
	1 – 3	32:06 - Berry (Maxwell, MacLean)
	1 – 4	47:42 - Devaney (Hindmarch, Gregg)
	1 – 5	53:29 - Primeau

0 min
Penalties
0 min
25
Shots
36

16 February 1980; 20:30	Canada	3 – 4 (1–2, 0–1, 2–1)	Finland	Olympic Fieldhouse, Lake Placid

Referee:
Lindgren

	0 – 1	04:03 - Peltonen (Suoraniemi)
MacLean (Berry, O'Malley) - 14:22	1 – 1
	1 – 2	19:51 - Leppänen (Hakulinen, Levo)
	1 – 3	37:07 - Koskilahti
G. Anderson (Nill, Davidson) - 46:47	2 – 3
	2 – 4	56:55 - Suoraniemi (Leppänen) (SH)
Primeau (Hindmarch, Devaney) - 57:09	3 – 4

16 min
Penalties
10 min
33
Shots
26

18 February 1980; 13:00	Canada	6 – 0 (2–0, 2–0, 2–0)	Japan	Olympic Arena, Lake Placid

Referee:
Neagles

Devaney (Zupancich, d'Alvise) (PP) - 09:36	1 – 0
Primeau - 14:35	2 – 0
MacLean (Maxwell) - 23:17	3 – 0
Davidson - 26:19	4 – 0
W. Anderson - 41:27	5 – 0
Hindmarch - 50:22	6 – 0

14 min
Penalties
22 min
48
Shots
13

20 February 1980; 17:00	Soviet Union	6 – 4 (1–1, 1–2, 4–1)	Canada	Olympic Fieldhouse, Lake Placid

Referee:
Neagles

	0 – 1	01:35 - Nill (Davidson, G. Anderson)
Balderis (Skvortsov, Zhluktov) - 13:42	1 – 1
	1 – 2	20:19 - Gregg
	1 – 3	22:38 - Pirie (Zupancich, d'Alvise)
Kasatonov (Krutov) - 39:47	2 – 3
Mikhailov (A. Golikov) - 41:53	3 – 3
A. Golikov (Makarov) - 42:05	4 – 3
	4 – 4	43:05 - d'Alvise
Mikhailov (Starikov) - 48:41	5 – 4
A. Golikov - 56:51	6 – 4

6 min
Penalties
12 min
35
Shots
26

=== Consolation round ===
The third-placed teams in each division, Czechoslovakia and Canada, played each other to determine fifth place.

22 February 1980; 13:30	Czechoslovakia	6 – 1 (5–0, 0–1, 1–0)	Canada	Olympic Fieldhouse, Lake Placid

Referee:
Dombrovsky

Fryčer (Nový, Pouzar) - 01:38	1 – 0
A. Šťastný - 02:14	2 – 0
M. Šťastný, Bubla, A. Šťastný) - 07:16	3 – 0
A. Šťastný (M. Šťastný, P. Šťastný) - 12:47	4 – 0
M. Šťastný (A. Šťastný, P. Šťastný) - 13:19	5 – 0
	5 – 1	28:01 - Devaney (Grant, Hindmarch)
M. Šťastný (P. Šťastný) - 57:18	6 – 1

8 min
Penalties
6 min
27
Shots
21

Final Rank: 6th place

- Team Roster

- Bob Dupuis
- Paul Pageau
- Warren Anderson
- Joe Grant
- Randy Gregg
- Terry O'Malley
- Brad Pirie
- Don Spring
- Tim Watters
- Glenn Anderson
- Ken Berry
- Dan D'Alvise
- Ron Davidson
- John Devaney
- Dave Hindmarch
- Paul MacLean
- Kevin Maxwell
- Jim Nill
- Kevin Primeau
- Stelio Zupancich
- Head coaches: Lorne Davis, Clare Drake & Tom Watt

== Luge ==
Men

Athlete	Run 1		Run 2		Run 3		Run 4		Total	
Athlete	Time	Rank	Time	Rank	Time	Rank	Time	Rank	Time	Rank
Bruce Smith	45.442	23	45.305	12	45.479	15	44.848	10	3:01.074	11
Mark Jensen	45.150	16	46.218	21	45.363	13	46.079	19	3:02.810	17

Women

Athlete	Run 1		Run 2		Run 3		Run 4		Total	
Athlete	Time	Rank	Time	Rank	Time	Rank	Time	Rank	Time	Rank
Danielle Nadeau	40.782	20	40.968	19	41.770	23	41.101	20	2:44.621	22
Carole Keyes	40.616	18	40.658	15	41.567	22	41.058	19	2:43.899	18

== Ski jumping ==
Athlete	Event	Jump 1		Jump 2		Total	
Athlete	Event	Distance	Points	Distance	Points	Points	Rank
Horst Bulau	Normal hill	64.5	79.4	75.0	100.7	180.1	41
Tauno Käyhkö	Normal hill	78.5	108.8	71.5	96.6	205.4	30
Steve Collins	Normal hill	81.0	111.8	72.0	95.9	207.7	28
Tauno Käyhkö	Large hill	98.0	104.4	97.5	104.2	208.6	26
Horst Bulau	Large hill	100.5	106.9	95.0	98.2	205.1	29
Steve Collins	Large hill	112.5	126.7	102.5	111.7	238.4	9

== Speed skating ==
Men

Event	Athlete	Race	
Event	Athlete	Time	Rank
500 m	Jacques Thibault	40.11	26
500 m	Gaétan Boucher	38.90	8
1000 m	Craig Webster	1:21.47	27
1000 m	Jacques Thibault	1:19.79	20
1000 m	Gaétan Boucher	1:16.68	2nd place, silver medalist(s)
1500 m	Jacques Thibault	2:06.79	27
1500 m	Craig Webster	2:02.41	23
1500 m	Gaétan Boucher	2:00.15	15
5000 m	Craig Webster	7:28.94	20

Women

Event	Athlete	Race	
Event	Athlete	Time	Rank
500 m	Sylvie Daigle	44.16	19
500 m	Kathy Vogt	44.15	18
500 m	Sylvia Burka	43.43	9
1000 m	Kathy Vogt	1:30.33	24
1000 m	Brenda Webster	1:29.84	19
1000 m	Sylvia Burka	1:27.50	7
1500 m	Kathy Vogt	2:16.09	16
1500 m	Brenda Webster	2:14.73	11
1500 m	Sylvia Burka	2:14.65	10
3000 m	Pat Durnin	4:58.42	23
3000 m	Sylvia Burka	4:44.22	12
3000 m	Brenda Webster	4:43.67	11
