= 1983–84 Canada men's national ice hockey team =

The 1983–84 Canada men's national ice hockey team represented Canada at the 1984 Winter Olympics held in Sarajevo, Yugoslavia.

Canada's team qualified for the medal round, but lost by the score of 4–0 to both the Soviet Union and Czechoslovakia to place fourth in the Olympic tournament.

== 1984 Winter Olympics roster ==
- 'Head coach: Dave King
- Warren Anderson
- Robin Bartel
- Russ Courtnall
- Jean-Jacques Daigneault
- Kevin Dineen
- Dave Donnelly
- Bruce Driver
- Darren Eliot
- Patrick Flatley
- Dave Gagner
- Mario Gosselin
- Vaughn Karpan
- Doug Lidster
- Darren Lowe
- Kirk Muller
- James Patrick
- Craig Redmond
- Dave Tippett (C)
- Carey Wilson
- Dan Wood

== See also ==
- Canada men's national ice hockey team
- Ice hockey at the 1984 Winter Olympics
- Ice hockey at the Olympic Games
- List of Canadian national ice hockey team rosters

Preceded by 1979–80 Canada men's national ice hockey team	Canada men's Olympic ice hockey team 1984	Succeeded by 1987–88 Canada men's national ice hockey team
