= 1991–92 Canada men's national ice hockey team =

The 1991–92 Canada men's national ice hockey team represented Canada at the 1992 Winter Olympics held at the Méribel Ice Palace in Méribel, a ski resort about 45 km from host city of Albertville, France.

Canada's team, coached by Dave King, team won the silver medal.

== 1992 Winter Olympics roster ==
- Head coach: Dave King
- Dave Archibald
- Todd Brost
- Sean Burke
- Kevin Dahl
- Curt Giles
- Dave Hannan
- Gord Hynes
- Fabian Joseph
- Joé Juneau
- Trevor Kidd
- Patrick Lebeau
- Chris Lindberg
- Eric Lindros
- Kent Manderville
- Adrien Plavsic
- Dan Ratushny
- Sam Saint-Laurent
- Brad Schlegel
- Wally Schreiber
- Randy Smith
- Dave Tippett
- Brian Tutt
- Jason Woolley

== See also ==
- Canada men's national ice hockey team
- Ice hockey at the 1992 Winter Olympics
- Ice hockey at the Olympic Games
- List of Canadian national ice hockey team rosters

Preceded by 1987–88 Canada men's national ice hockey team	Canada men's Olympic ice hockey team 1992	Succeeded by 1993–94 Canada men's national ice hockey team
