= 1987–88 Canada men's national ice hockey team =

The 1987–88 Canada men's national ice hockey team represented Canada at the 1988 Winter Olympics held in Calgary, Alberta, Canada.

== Background ==
The 1988 Winter Olympics represented the first time that NHL players were allowed to compete in the Olympic games.

Canada's team qualified for the final round, but placed fourth and out of the medals in the Olympic tournament.

== 1988 Winter Olympics roster ==
- Head coach: Dave King
- Ken Berry
- Serge Boisvert
- Brian Bradley
- Sean Burke
- Chris Felix
- Randy Gregg
- Marc Habscheid
- Bob Joyce
- Vaughn Karpan
- Merlin Malinowski
- Andy Moog
- Jim Peplinski
- Serge Roy
- Wally Schreiber
- Gord Sherven
- Tony Stiles
- Steve Tambellini
- Claude Vilgrain
- Tim Watters
- Ken Yaremchuk
- Trent Yawney (C)
- Zarley Zalapski

== See also ==
- Canada men's national ice hockey team
- Ice hockey at the 1988 Winter Olympics
- Ice hockey at the Olympic Games
- List of Canadian national ice hockey team rosters

| Preceded by 1983–84 Canada men's national ice hockey team | Canada men's Olympic ice hockey team 1988 | Succeeded by 1991–92 Canada men's national ice hockey team |
