= 1997–98 Canada men's national ice hockey team =

The 1997–98 Canada men's national ice hockey team represented Canada at the 1998 Winter Olympics held in Nagano, Japan.

Canada's team, coached by Marc Crawford, placed fourth in the Olympic tournament.

== History ==
1998 marked the first time the modern NHL paused its season to allow players to compete in the Olympics, enabling countries to field professional teams of the highest calibre. Team Canada's Olympic roster was selected by Bobby Clarke, who was then general manager of the Philadelphia Flyers. Eric Lindros was named captain over longtime leaders such as Wayne Gretzky, Steve Yzerman, and Ray Bourque. Rob Zamuner was a surprise pick, while Mark Messier, Ron Francis, Adam Oates, and Scott Niedermayer were omitted.

Clarke was joined in management by assistant general managers Bob Gainey and Pierre Gauthier.

The coaching staff was led by head coach Marc Crawford of the Colorado Avalanche. He was joined by associate coach Andy Murray, assistant coaches Wayne Cashman and Mike Johnston, and video coach Rob Cookson. Murray, Johnston, and Cookson all had prior experience with Canada's full-time national team and the larger International Ice Hockey Federation rink surface.

The Canadian team, despite a strong start in the round robin, failed to win a medal, losing 3 - 2 to Finland in the bronze medal game.

== 1998 Winter Olympics roster ==
- Head coach: Marc Crawford
- Rob Blake - Los Angeles Kings
- Raymond Bourque - Boston Bruins
- Rod Brind'Amour - Philadelphia Flyers
- Martin Brodeur - New Jersey Devils
- Shayne Corson - Montreal Canadiens
- Éric Desjardins - Philadelphia Flyers
- Theoren Fleury - Calgary Flames
- Adam Foote - Colorado Avalanche
- Wayne Gretzky (A) - New York Rangers
- Curtis Joseph - Edmonton Oilers
- Trevor Linden - New York Islanders
- Eric Lindros (C) - Philadelphia Flyers
- Al MacInnis - St. Louis Blues
- Joe Nieuwendyk - Dallas Stars
- Keith Primeau - Carolina Hurricanes
- Chris Pronger - St. Louis Blues
- Mark Recchi - Montreal Canadiens
- Patrick Roy - Colorado Avalanche
- Joe Sakic - Colorado Avalanche
- Brendan Shanahan - Detroit Red Wings
- Scott Stevens (A) - New Jersey Devils
- Steve Yzerman (A) - Detroit Red Wings
- Rob Zamuner- Tampa Bay Lightning

== See also ==
- Canada men's national ice hockey team
- Ice hockey at the 1998 Winter Olympics
- Ice hockey at the Olympic Games
- List of Canadian national ice hockey team rosters

Preceded by 1993–94 Canada men's national ice hockey team	Canada men's Olympic ice hockey team 1998	Succeeded by 2001–02 Canada men's national ice hockey team
