= Josh Primeau =

Canadian ice hockey player (born 1990)

- Born: November 14, 1990 (age 34); Zug, Switzerland
- Height: 6 ft 4 in (193 cm)
- Weight: 209 lb (95 kg; 14 st 13 lb)
- Position: Left wing
- Shoots: Right
- NL team Former teams: SC Rapperswil-Jona Lakers; Lausanne HC; HC Ajoie; SC Langenthal
- NHL draft: Undrafted
- Playing career: 2011–present

Josh Primeau (born November 14, 1990) is a Canadian professional ice hockey player who is currently playing with the SC Rapperswil-Jona Lakers of the National League (NL). Primeau holds a Swiss player license which allows him to play in the National League as a non-import player.

Primeau made his National League A debut playing with Lausanne HC during the 2013–14 NLA season.

== Family ==
Primeau is the son of the former National Hockey League (NHL) player Kevin Primeau. His younger brother Ben was the captain of the 2013-14 Fernie Ghostriders in the KIJHL.
