= Rick Wilson (ice hockey) =

Canadian ice hockey player and coach (born 1950)

- Born: August 10, 1950 (age 75) Prince Albert, Saskatchewan, Canada
- Height: 6 ft 1 in (185 cm)
- Weight: 195 lb (88 kg; 13 st 13 lb)
- Position: Defence
- Shot: Left
- Played for: Montreal Canadiens; St. Louis Blues; Detroit Red Wings
- Coached for: New York Islanders (assistant); Los Angeles Kings (assistant); Minnesota North Stars (assistant); Dallas Stars; Tampa Bay Lightning (associate); Minnesota Wild (assistant); St. Louis Blues (assistant); Philadelphia Flyers (assistant)
- NHL draft: 66th overall, 1970; Montreal Canadiens
- Playing career: 1972–1978
- Coaching career: 1978–2019

Richard Gordon Wilson (born August 10, 1950) is a Canadian former professional ice hockey defenceman and head coach. Wilson was mostly recently an assistant coach for the Philadelphia Flyers of the National Hockey League (NHL).

== Playing career ==
Wilson was drafted by the Montreal Canadiens in the 1970 NHL Amateur Draft, sixty-sixth overall. He played for the AHL Nova Scotia Voyageurs, Montreal Canadiens, St. Louis Blues, Detroit Red Wings and AHL Philadelphia Firebirds.

== Coaching career ==
He was an assistant coach for the University of North Dakota Fighting Sioux hockey team, Prince Albert Raiders, New York Islanders, Los Angeles Kings and Dallas Stars. He was also an acting head coach between January 25, 2002, and May 2002 for the Dallas Stars. He won the Memorial Cup in 1985. He won the Stanley Cup in 1999. On August 10, 2010 Wilson was named assistant coach for the Minnesota Wild organization, a position he held until the conclusion of the 2015-16 season.

He is also the father of former NHL forward Landon Wilson.

== Career statistics ==
| | | | Regular season | | | | | Playoffs |
| Season | Team | League | GP | G | A | Pts | PIM | GP | G | A | Pts | PIM |
|---|---|---|---|---|---|---|---|---|---|---|---|---|
| 1969–70 | University of North Dakota | WCHA | 30 | 2 | 9 | 11 | 32 | — | — | — | — | — |
| 1970–71 | University of North Dakota | WCHA | 33 | 6 | 9 | 15 | 113 | — | — | — | — | — |
| 1971–72 | University of North Dakota | WCHA | 25 | 7 | 19 | 26 | 89 | — | — | — | — | — |
| 1972–73 | Nova Scotia Voyageurs | AHL | 70 | 4 | 11 | 15 | 163 | 12 | 1 | 0 | 1 | 56 |
| 1973–74 | Nova Scotia Voyageurs | AHL | 47 | 4 | 19 | 23 | 65 | — | — | — | — | — |
| 1973–74 | Montreal Canadiens | NHL | 21 | 0 | 2 | 2 | 6 | — | — | — | — | — |
| 1974–75 | St. Louis Blues | NHL | 76 | 2 | 5 | 7 | 83 | 2 | 0 | 0 | 0 | 0 |
| 1975–76 | St. Louis Blues | NHL | 65 | 1 | 6 | 7 | 20 | 1 | 0 | 0 | 0 | 0 |
| 1976–77 | Detroit Red Wings | NHL | 77 | 3 | 13 | 16 | 56 | — | — | — | — | — |
| 1977–78 | Philadelphia Firebirds | AHL | 75 | 4 | 28 | 32 | 101 | 4 | 0 | 1 | 1 | 2 |
| NHL totals | | | 239 | 6 | 26 | 32 | 165 | 3 | 0 | 0 | 0 | 0 |

== Coaching statistics ==
| Team | Year | Regular season | | | | | | | Postseason |
| Team | Year | G | W | L | T | OTL | Pts | Finish | Result |
|---|---|---|---|---|---|---|---|---|---|
| Dallas Stars | 2001-02 | 32 | 13 | 11 | 7 | 1 | (90) | 4th in Pacific | Missed Playoffs |

| Team | Lge | Season | Record |
|---|---|---|---|
| Prince Albert | WHL | 1986–87 | 43–26–3 |
| Prince Albert | WHL | 1987–88 | 43–24–5 |
| NY Islanders | NHL | 1988–89 | Assistant |
| Los Angeles | NHL | 1989–90 | Assistant |
| Los Angeles | NHL | 1990–91 | Assistant |
| Los Angeles | NHL | 1991–92 | Assistant |
| Minnesota | NHL | 1992–93 | Assistant |
| Dallas | NHL | 1993–94 | Assistant |
| Dallas | NHL | 1994–95 | Assistant |
| Dallas | NHL | 1995–96 | Assistant |
| Dallas | NHL | 1996–97 | Assistant |
| Dallas | NHL | 1997–98 | Assistant |
| Dallas | NHL | 1998–99 | Assistant |
| Dallas | NHL | 1999–00 | Assistant |
| Dallas | NHL | 2000–01 | Assistant |
| Dallas | NHL | 2001–02 | Assistant |
| Dallas | NHL | 2002–03 | Assistant |
| Dallas | NHL | 2003–04 | Assistant |
| Dallas | NHL | 2005–06 | Assistant |
| Dallas | NHL | 2006–07 | Assistant |
| Dallas | NHL | 2007–08 | Assistant |
| NHL coaching totals | | | 13–11–8 |

== Awards and honours ==
| Award | Year |
|---|---|
| All-WCHA Second Team | 1971–72 |
NHL
| Stanley Cup | 1999 |

Awards and achievements
| Preceded by Ken Hitchcock | Head coach of the Dallas Stars; 2002 | Succeeded by Dave Tippett |
