= 1979–80 Canada men's national ice hockey team =

The 1979–80 Canada men's national ice hockey team represented Canada at the 1980 Winter Olympics held in Lake Placid in the United States.

This was the first men's ice hockey team to compete for Canada at the Olympics since the 1968 Winter Olympics held at Grenoble, France.

Canada's team placed sixth in the tournament to finish out of the medals.

== History ==
Canada returned to ice hockey at the 1980 Winter Olympics after missing both the 1972 and 1976 Winter Olympics due to a dispute with the IIHF over the use of professional athletes at world championships.

=== 1980 Winter Olympics roster ===
- Head coaches: Lorne Davis, Clare Drake, Tom Watt
- Glenn Anderson
- Warren Anderson
- Dan D'Alvise
- Ken Berry
- Ron Davidson
- John Devaney
- Bob Dupuis
- Joe Grant
- Randy Gregg (C)
- Dave Hindmarch
- Paul MacLean
- Kevin Maxwell
- James Nill
- Terry O'Malley
- Paul Pageau
- Brad Pirie
- Kevin Primeau
- Don Spring
- Tim Watters
- Stelio Zupancich

== See also ==
- Canada men's national ice hockey team
- Ice hockey at the 1980 Winter Olympics
- Ice hockey at the Olympic Games
- List of Canadian national ice hockey team rosters

Preceded by 1967–68 Canada men's national ice hockey team	Canada men's Olympic ice hockey team 1980	Succeeded by 1983–84 Canada men's national ice hockey team
