= List of Dallas Stars head coaches =

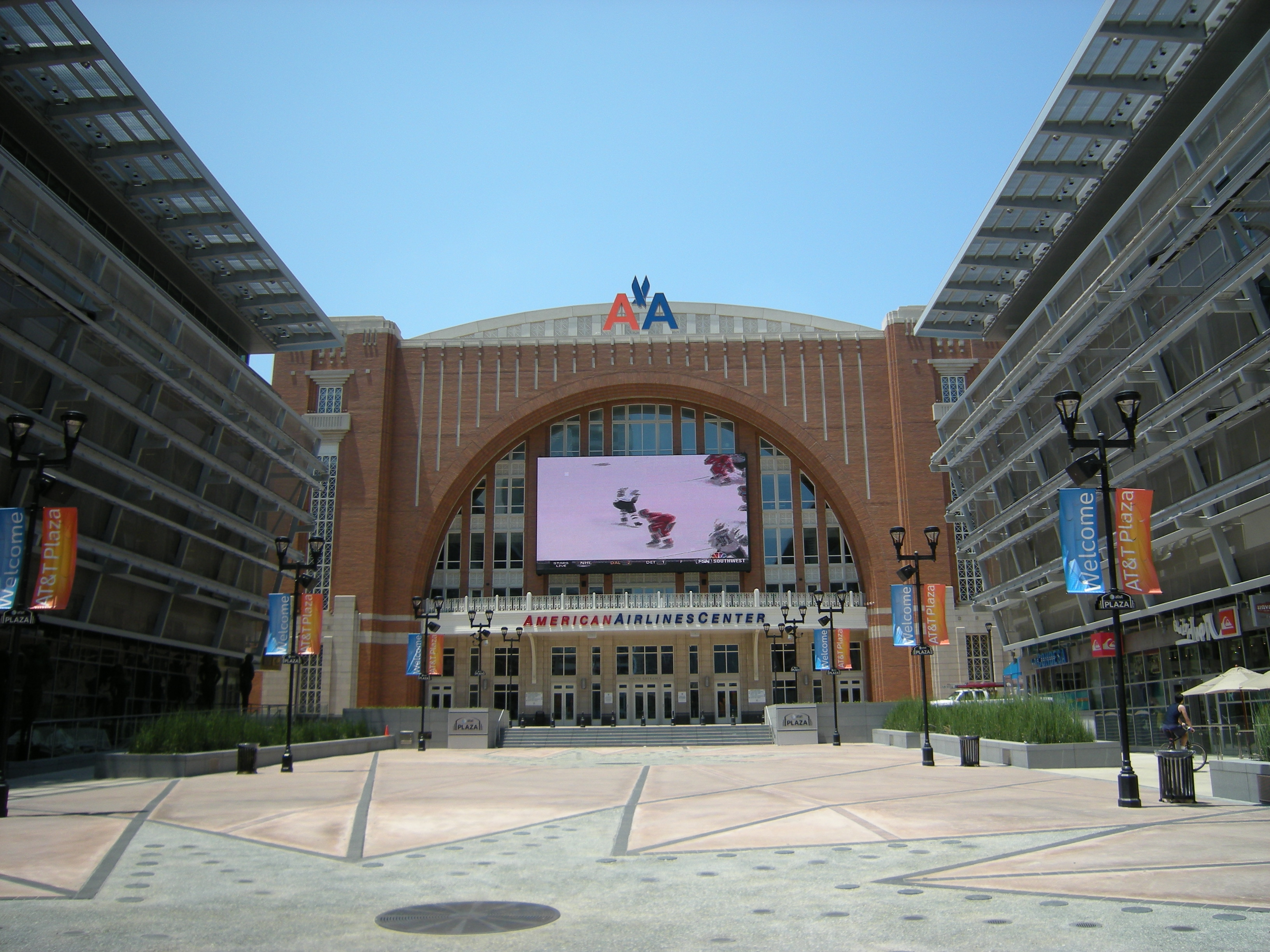
The Stars have played their home games at the American Airlines Center since 2001.

The Dallas Stars are an American professional ice hockey team based in Dallas. They play in the Central Division of the Western Conference in the National Hockey League (NHL). The team joined the NHL in 1967 as an expansion team as the Minnesota North Stars, but moved to Dallas in 1993. The Stars won their first Stanley Cup championship in 1999. Having first played at the Reunion Arena, the Stars have played their home games at the American Airlines Center since 2001. The current head coach is Glen Gulutzan, who was hired for his second tenure as head coach on July 1, 2025.

There have been eight head coaches for the Stars' team. The team's first head coach was Bob Gainey, who coached for four seasons. In the middle of the 1995–96 season, Gainey, who was then also the general manager for the Stars, fired himself as head coach and hired Ken Hitchcock to take over. Hitchcock is the team's all-time leader for the most regular-season games coached (585), the most regular-season game wins (319), the most regular-season points (718), the most playoff games coached (80), and the most playoff-game wins (47). Hitchcock is the only Stars coach to have won the Presidents' Trophy, winning it in 1997–98 and 1998–99, the Clarence S. Campbell Bowl, winning it in 1998–99 and 1999–2000, and the Stanley Cup, winning it in the 1999 Stanley Cup Finals against the Buffalo Sabres. Hitchcock returned for one more season with the Stars in 2017–18. None of the Stars coaches have been elected into the Hockey Hall of Fame as a builder.

== Key ==
#	Number of coaches^{[a]}
GC	Games coached
W	Wins = 2 points
L	Losses = 0 points
T	Ties = 1 point
OT	Overtime/shootout losses = 1 point^{[b]}
PTS	Points
Win%	Winning percentage
*	Spent entire NHL head coaching career with the Stars

== Coaches ==
Note: Statistics are correct through the 2024–25 season.

#	Name	Term^{[c]}	Regular season						Playoffs				Achievements	Reference
#	Name	Term^{[c]}	GC	W	L	T/OT	PTS	Win%	GC	W	L	Win%	Achievements	Reference
1	Bob Gainey	1993–1996	171	70	71	30	170	.497	14	6	8	.429		
2	Ken Hitchcock	1996–2002	503	277	154	72	626	.622	80	47	33	.588		
3	Rick Wilson*	2002	32	13	11	8	34	.531	—	—	—	—		
4	Dave Tippett	2002–2009	492	271	156	65	607	.617	47	21	26	.447		
5	Marc Crawford	2009–2011	164	79	60	25	183	.558	—	—	—	—		
6	Glen Gulutzan	2011–2013	130	64	57	9	137	.527	—	—	—	—		
7	Lindy Ruff	2013–2017	328	165	122	41	371	.566	19	9	10	.474		
—	Ken Hitchcock	2017–2018	82	42	32	8	92	.561	—	—	—	—		
8	Jim Montgomery	2018–2019	113	60	43	10	130	.575	13	7	6	.538		
9	Rick Bowness	2019–2022	176	89	62	25	203	.577	33	17	16	.515		
10	Peter DeBoer	2022–2025	246	149	68	29	327	.665	56	29	27	.518		
–	Glen Gulutzan	2025–present						–				–		

== Notes ==
- ^{a} A running total of the number of coaches of the Stars. Thus, any coach who has two or more separate terms as head coach is only counted once.
- ^{b} Before the 2005–06 season, the NHL instituted a penalty shootout for regular season games that remained tied after a five-minute overtime period, which prevented ties.
- ^{c} Each year is linked to an article about that particular NHL season.
