= Chris Felix =

Canadian ice hockey player

- Born: May 27, 1964 (age 60); Bramalea, Ontario, Canada
- Height: 5 ft 11 in (180 cm)
- Weight: 194 lb (88 kg; 13 st 12 lb)
- Position: Defence
- Shot: Right
- Played for: Team Canada; Washington Capitals
- NHL draft: Undrafted
- Playing career: 1985–2002

Christopher Robin Felix (born May 27, 1964) is a Canadian former professional ice hockey defenceman. He played junior for the Sault Ste. Marie Greyhounds and was the team's captain in the 1984–85 season. He played for 35 games in the National Hockey League with the Washington Capitals from 1988 to 1990, who signed him as a free agent in 1988. The rest of his career, which lasted from 1985 to 2002, was spent in the minor leagues and in European leagues. Internationally Felix played for the Canadian national team at the 1988 Winter Olympics. In six games, he scored one goal and two assists as Canada finished fourth overall. He later played 11 more seasons in Austria, Switzerland, Germany and the minor leagues. He also played in three Spengler Cups.

== Career statistics ==
=== Regular season and playoffs ===
			Regular season					Playoffs
Season	Team	League	GP	G	A	Pts	PIM	GP	G	A	Pts	PIM
1980–81	Bramalea Blues	MetJHL	20	26	28	54		—	—	—	—	—
1981–82	Sault Ste. Marie Greyhounds	OHL	66	3	18	21	37	7	0	2	2	0
1982–83	Sault Ste. Marie Greyhounds	OHL	66	15	47	62	39	16	2	12	14	10
1983–84	Sault Ste. Marie Greyhounds	OHL	70	32	61	93	77	16	3	20	23	16
1984–85	Sault Ste. Marie Greyhounds	OHL	63	29	72	101	85	16	7	21	28	25
1984–85	Sault Ste. Marie Greyhounds	M-Cup	—	—	—	—	—	3	2	6	8	10
1985–86	Canadian National Team	Intl	73	7	33	40	33	—	—	—	—	—
1986–87	Canadian National Team	Intl	78	14	38	52	36	—	—	—	—	—
1987–88	Canadian National Team	Intl	68	7	27	34	68	—	—	—	—	—
1987–88	Fort Wayne Komets	IHL	19	5	17	22	24	6	4	4	8	0
1987–88	Washington Capitals	NHL	—	—	—	—	—	1	0	0	0	0
1988–89	Washington Capitals	NHL	21	0	8	8	8	1	0	1	1	0
1988–89	Baltimore Skipjacks	AHL	50	8	29	37	44	—	—	—	—	—
1989–90	Washington Capitals	NHL	6	1	0	1	2	—	—	—	—	—
1989–90	Baltimore Skipjacks	AHL	73	19	42	61	115	12	0	11	11	18
1990–91	Washington Capitals	NHL	8	0	4	4	0	—	—	—	—	—
1990–91	Baltimore Skipjacks	AHL	27	4	24	28	26	6	1	4	5	6
1991–92	EV Innsbruck	AUT	44	13	41	54	91	—	—	—	—	—
1992–93	EV Innsbruck	AUT	30	8	28	36	37	—	—	—	—	—
1993–94	EC KAC	AUT	45	18	28	46	86	—	—	—	—	—
1994–95	EC KAC	AUT	33	11	25	36	28	—	—	—	—	—
1995–96	Genève-Servette HC	NLB	35	9	16	25	91	3	0	1	1	0
1996–97	Ilves	SM-l	49	2	12	14	50	8	0	1	1	22
1997–98	Kaufbeurer Adler	DEL	15	0	4	4	20	—	—	—	—	—
1997–98	Adler Mannheim	DEL	25	0	1	1	6	3	1	0	1	4
1998–99	South Carolina Stingrays	ECHL	70	5	15	20	70	3	0	2	2	8
1999–00	New Mexico Scorpions	WPHL	65	10	40	50	78	15	0	8	8	30
2000–01	Topeka ScareCrows	CHL	68	7	38	45	100	4	0	0	0	12
2001–02	Bakersfield Condors	WCHL	70	4	25	29	87	4	0	0	0	6
AUT totals			152	50	122	172	242	—	—	—	—	—
NHL totals			35	1	12	13	10	2	0	1	1	0

=== International ===
Year	Team	Event	GP	G	A	Pts	PIM
1988	Canada	OLY	6	1	2	3	2
Senior totals			6	1	2	3	2
