= 1993–94 Canada men's national ice hockey team =

The 1993–94 Canada men's national ice hockey team represented Canada at the 1994 Winter Olympics held at the Fjellhallen in Gjøvik and the Håkons Hall in Lillehammer, Norway. Canada's team, coached by Tom Renney, won the silver medal.

== 1994 Winter Olympics roster ==
- Head coach: Tom Renney
- Mark Astley
- Adrian Aucoin
- David Harlock
- Corey Hirsch
- Todd Hlushko
- Greg Johnson
- Fabian Joseph
- Paul Kariya
- Chris Kontos
- Manny Legacé
- Ken Lovsin
- Derek Mayer
- Petr Nedvěd
- Dwayne Norris
- Greg Parks
- Allain Roy
- Jean-Yves Roy
- Brian Savage
- Brad Schlegel
- Wally Schreiber
- Chris Therien
- Todd Warriner
- Brad Werenka

== See also ==
- Canada men's national ice hockey team
- Ice hockey at the 1994 Winter Olympics
- Ice hockey at the Olympic Games
- List of Canadian national ice hockey team rosters

Preceded by 1991–92 Canada men's national ice hockey team	Canada men's Olympic ice hockey team 1994	Succeeded by 1997–98 Canada men's national ice hockey team
