= Ken Hitchcock =

Canadian ice hockey coach

- Hockey Hall of Fame, 2023 (Builder)
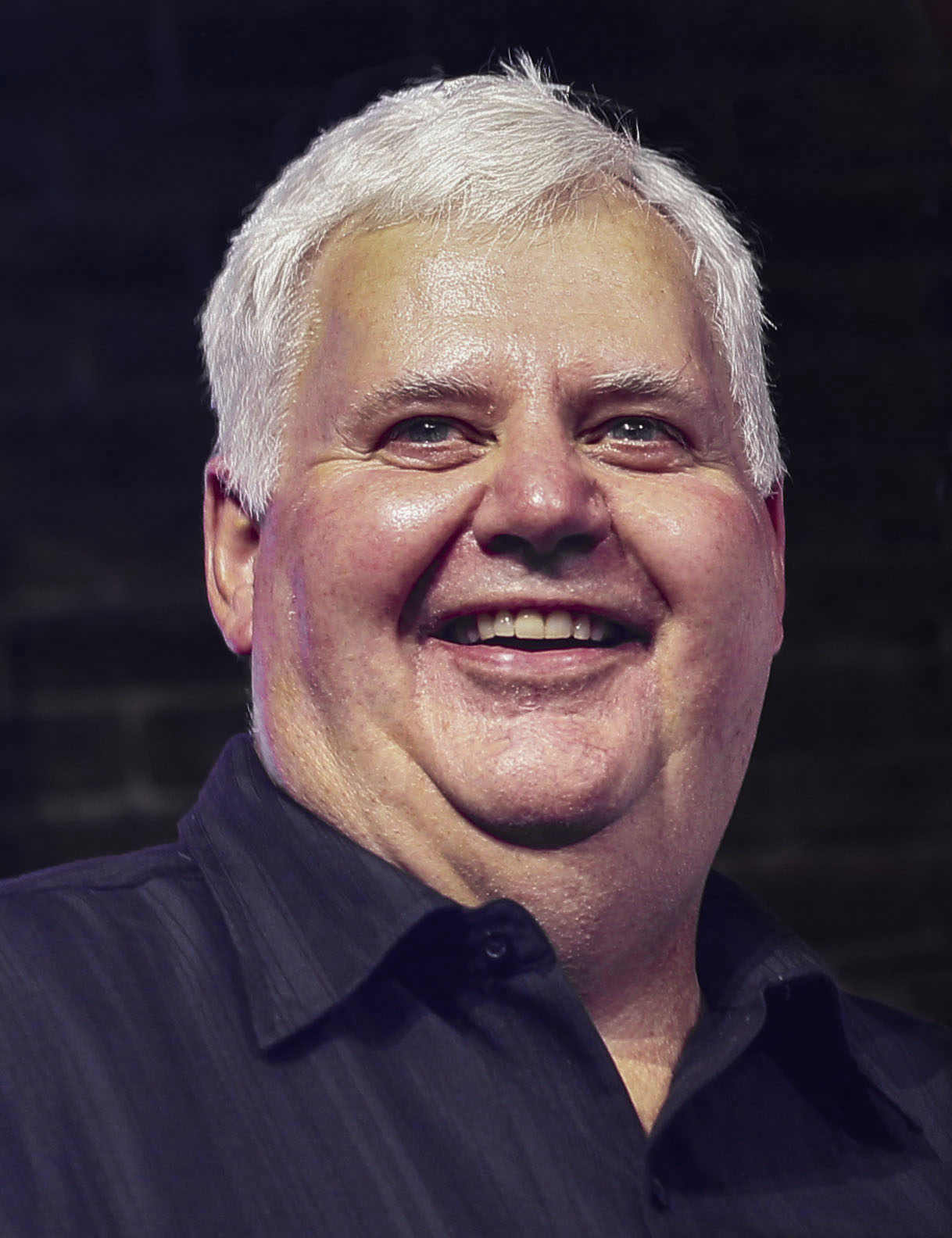
- Hitchcock in 2014
- Born: December 17, 1951 (age 74) Edmonton, Alberta, Canada
- Coached for: Dallas Stars; Philadelphia Flyers; Columbus Blue Jackets; St. Louis Blues; Edmonton Oilers
- Coaching career: 1984–2019

Kenneth S. Hitchcock (born December 17, 1951) is a Canadian former professional ice hockey coach. Hitchcock coached the Dallas Stars, Philadelphia Flyers, Columbus Blue Jackets, St. Louis Blues and Edmonton Oilers of the National Hockey League (NHL). He also served as an assistant coach for Canada national team in the 2014 Winter Olympics. Hitchcock became a major league coach in January 1996 when the Dallas Stars named him coach with 43 games remaining in the season. The following season was the start of five elite years for the team, where they won five consecutive division championships to go along with reaching the Conference Finals in 1998, 1999, and 2000. The Stars advanced to the Stanley Cup in 1999, which they won in six games over the Buffalo Sabres. They reached the 2000 Stanley Cup Final but lost to the New Jersey Devils in six games; Hitchcock was fired 50 games into the 2001-02 season. He was hired by the Philadelphia Flyers in 2002 and coached them to three playoff appearances, which included a Conference Finals appearance in 2004 but was fired eight games into the 2006 season. He was quickly hired by the Columbus Blue Jackets that year and coached four seasons, where he helped them reach their first Stanley Cup playoffs in 2009; he was fired the following season. He was hired to coach the St. Louis Blues in 2011, and in his first season he led them to their first division title in twelve years. They reached the Conference Finals once in 2016 but Hitchcock was fired in the middle of the 2016-17 season. Hitchcock initially retired after spending the 2017-18 season with the Stars as coach but returned to coach the last 62 games of the 2018-19 season for the Edmonton Oilers before he was let go. Hitchcock is the fourth-winningest coach in NHL history with a total of 849 victories. He was named a 2019 Order of Hockey in Canada recipient. Hitchcock was inducted into the Hockey Hall of Fame as a builder in 2023.

== Early years ==
While growing up playing hockey in western Canada, Hitchcock found he could motivate players. This led him into coaching, first at various levels in the Edmonton area, and later a ten-year stint at the helm of the midget AAA Sherwood Park Chain Gang. Hitchcock led Sherwood Park to a record of 575–69. In his spare time, he taught hockey fundamentals to girls at a local hockey school.

Hitchcock submitted his credentials to the new owners of the WHL's Kamloops Blazers, Gary Cooper and Colin Day. Hitchcock assumed his position behind the bench for the 1984–85 season and had an immediate effect on the Blazers, leading them to four consecutive division titles and league titles in 1985–86 and 1989–90. In both of the seasons he guided the Blazers to the league title, Hitchcock was named the WHL Coach of the Year, and he was named the top coach in Canadian major junior hockey in 1990. Hitch's team appeared in the Memorial Cup tournament twice, never advancing beyond the semi-finals. In six seasons in Kamloops, Hitchcock recorded a 291–125–15 record, which stands as the second best in WHL history.

== NHL coaching career ==
=== Dallas Stars ===
In 1990, Hitchcock left the WHL and joined the Philadelphia Flyers as an assistant coach. Hitchcock spent three seasons with the Flyers organization before leaving to helm the IHL affiliate of the Dallas Stars, the Kalamazoo Wings, for the 1993–94 season.

In the middle of his third season with the team (then renamed the Michigan K-Wings), he was offered the head coaching position with the Dallas Stars, and on January 8, 1996, he was named head coach, replacing Bob Gainey, who remained with the Stars as general manager. In his first full season with the Stars, he led the team to the Central Division title, the franchise's first since 1984, when the team was still in Minnesota. In his second full season with the Stars, Hitchcock again led the Stars to the playoffs, losing in the Conference Finals to the eventual Stanley Cup champion Detroit Red Wings. Also during the 1997–98 season, Hitchcock was named to his first of three consecutive NHL All-Star Game teams as coach.

During the 1998–99 NHL season, Hitchcock led the Stars to a regular season record of 51–19–12. In the 1999 playoffs, Hitchcock led the team to a Stanley Cup victory over the Buffalo Sabres, the team's first. The next season, Hitchcock again led the team to the Stanley Cup Final, only to lose to the New Jersey Devils.

In the 2000–01 season, Hitchcock again led the Stars to the playoffs, but the team exited in the Conference Semifinals. Midway through the following season, after getting off to a mediocre 23–21–6 start and in the midst of strife between the players and management, Hitchcock was fired as head coach.

=== Philadelphia Flyers ===
Hitchcock was quickly picked up in the 2002 off-season by his old team, the Philadelphia Flyers, who had just fired their head coach, Bill Barber, after an early exit from the playoffs. Hitchcock brought much-needed discipline and direction to the Flyers and led them to a 45–24–13 record in his first season, losing in the Conference Semifinals. In Hitchcock's second season with the Flyers, they finished first in the Atlantic Division with a 40–21–15 record and advanced to the Conference Finals, losing to the eventual champion Tampa Bay Lightning in seven games.

In the 2006–07 NHL season, the Flyers got off to a 1–6–1 start over their first eight games, their worst start in 15 years. After a 9–1 loss to the Buffalo Sabres, management promised there would be some major changes to the organization. On October 22, 2006, the Flyers fired Hitchcock, and general manager Bobby Clarke stepped down. On November 1, the Flyers assigned Hitchcock to be a pro scout for the club.

=== Columbus Blue Jackets ===
On November 22, 2006, Hitchcock and the Columbus Blue Jackets agreed to a three-year contract to become their new head coach. He coached his first game for the Blue Jackets on November 24, against his former team, the Philadelphia Flyers, a game Columbus lost, 3–2.

On July 9, 2008, the Blue Jackets announced that they had signed Hitchcock to a three-year extension to remain as their head coach. On February 19, 2009, the Blue Jackets earned Hitchcock his 500th career NHL win as a head coach by defeating the Toronto Maple Leafs. On April 8, 2009, Hitchcock secured the Blue Jackets' first-ever postseason appearance with a 4–3 shootout win over the Chicago Blackhawks. Their playoff appearance would be a short one as they were swept in the Conference Quarterfinals by the Detroit Red Wings.

On November 11, 2009, in a 9–1 loss to the Detroit Red Wings, Hitchcock became the 16th NHL coach to reach the 1,000-game milestone. On February 3, 2010, the Blue Jackets relieved Hitchcock of his duties behind the bench and named assistant coach Claude Noël as the club's interim head coach.

=== St. Louis Blues ===
On November 6, 2011, the St. Louis Blues fired coach Davis Payne and hired Hitchcock in his place. On June 20, 2012, Hitchcock won the Jack Adams Award as the NHL's best head coach.

On February 12, 2015, Hitchcock earned his 693rd career regular season win in a 6–3 defeat of the Tampa Bay Lightning, passing Dick Irvin for sole possession of fourth place on the all-time coaching wins list. On March 12, Hitchcock earned his 700th career win as head coach in a 1–0 win over the Philadelphia Flyers.

In the 2015–16 season, Hitchcock coached the Blues to the Conference Finals. Despite home ice advantage against the San Jose Sharks, the Blues were defeated in six games. On May 31, 2016, Hitchcock announced that he would retire from coaching at the end of the 2016–17 season. However, Hitchcock did not finish his planned last season with St. Louis as on February 1, 2017, Hitchcock was fired by the Blues and was replaced by Mike Yeo. Hitchcock was fired one game before tying Al Arbour's record (782) for third-most wins by an NHL head coach.

=== Return to Dallas ===
On April 13, 2017, Hitchcock was named as the head coach of the Dallas Stars for the second time. On December 21, Hitchcock earned his 800th win as NHL head coach when the Stars defeated the Blackhawks 4–0. On April 13, 2018, Hitchcock announced his retirement.

=== Edmonton Oilers ===
On November 20, 2018, Hitchcock came out of retirement and was named head coach of the Edmonton Oilers after Todd McLellan was relieved of his duties. In early May 2019, it was announced that Hitchcock was dismissed and would not return.

== Head coaching record ==
Team	Year	Regular season							Postseason			
Team	Year	G	W	L	T	OTL	Pts	Finish	W	L	Win%	Result
DAL	1995–96	43	15	23	5	—	(35)	6th in Central	—	—	—	Missed playoffs
DAL	1996–97	82	48	26	8	—	104	1st in Central	3	4	.429	Lost in Conference quarterfinals (EDM)
DAL	1997–98	82	49	22	11	—	109	1st in Central	10	7	.588	Lost in Conference finals (DET)
DAL	1998–99	82	51	19	12	—	114	1st in Pacific	16	7	.696	Won Stanley Cup (BUF)
DAL	1999–00	82	43	23	10	6	102	1st in Pacific	14	9	.609	Lost in Stanley Cup Final (NJD)
DAL	2000–01	82	48	24	8	2	106	1st in Pacific	4	6	.400	Lost in Conference semifinals (STL)
DAL	2001–02	50	23	17	6	4	(56)	(fired)	—	—	—	—
PHI	2002–03	82	45	20	13	4	107	2nd in Atlantic	6	7	.462	Lost in Conference semifinals (OTT)
PHI	2003–04	82	40	21	15	6	101	1st in Atlantic	11	7	.611	Lost in Conference finals (TBL)
PHI	2005–06	82	45	26	—	11	101	2nd in Atlantic	2	4	.333	Lost in Conference quarterfinals (BUF)
PHI	2006–07	8	1	6	—	1	(3)	(fired)	—	—	—	—
PHI total		254	131	73	28	22			19	18	.514	
CBJ	2006–07	62	28	29	—	5	(73)	4th in Central	—	—	—	Missed playoffs
CBJ	2007–08	82	34	36	—	12	80	4th in Central	—	—	—	Missed playoffs
CBJ	2008–09	82	41	31	—	10	92	4th in Central	0	4	.000	Lost in Conference quarterfinals (DET)
CBJ	2009–10	58	22	27	—	9	(53)	(fired)	—	—	—	—
CBJ total		284	125	123	—	35			0	4	.000	
STL	2011–12	69	43	15	—	11	(97)	1st in Central	4	5	.444	Lost in Conference semifinals (LAK)
STL	2012–13	48	29	17	—	2	60	2nd in Central	2	4	.333	Lost in Conference quarterfinals (LAK)
STL	2013–14	82	52	23	—	7	111	2nd in Central	2	4	.333	Lost in first round (CHI)
STL	2014–15	82	51	24	—	7	109	1st in Central	2	4	.333	Lost in first round (MIN)
STL	2015–16	82	49	24	—	9	107	2nd in Central	10	10	.500	Lost in Conference finals (SJS)
STL	2016–17	50	24	21	—	5	(53)	(fired)	—	—	—	—
STL total		413	248	124	—	41			20	27	.426	
DAL	2017–18	82	42	32	—	8	92	6th in Central	—	—	—	Missed playoffs
DAL total		585	319	186	60	20			47	33	.588	
EDM	2018–19	62	26	28	—	8	(60)	7th in Pacific	—	—	—	Missed playoffs
EDM total		62	26	28	—	8			—	—	—	
Total		1,598	849	534	88	127		8 division titles	86	82	.512	14 playoff appearances 1 Stanley Cup

Awards and achievements
Preceded by Bob Gainey; Lindy Ruff	Head coach of the Dallas Stars; 1996–2002; 2017–2018	Succeeded by Rick Wilson; Jim Montgomery
Preceded by Bill Barber	Head coach of the Philadelphia Flyers; 2002–2006	Succeeded by John Stevens
Preceded by Gary Agnew	Head coach of the Columbus Blue Jackets; 2006–2010	Succeeded by Claude Noël
Preceded by Davis Payne	Head coach of the St. Louis Blues; 2011–2017	Succeeded by Mike Yeo
Preceded by Todd McLellan	Head coach of the Edmonton Oilers; 2018–2019	Succeeded by Dave Tippett
Sporting positions
Preceded by Dan Bylsma	Jack Adams Award winner 2012	Succeeded by Paul MacLean
