= Glen Gulutzan =

Canadian ice hockey player and coach

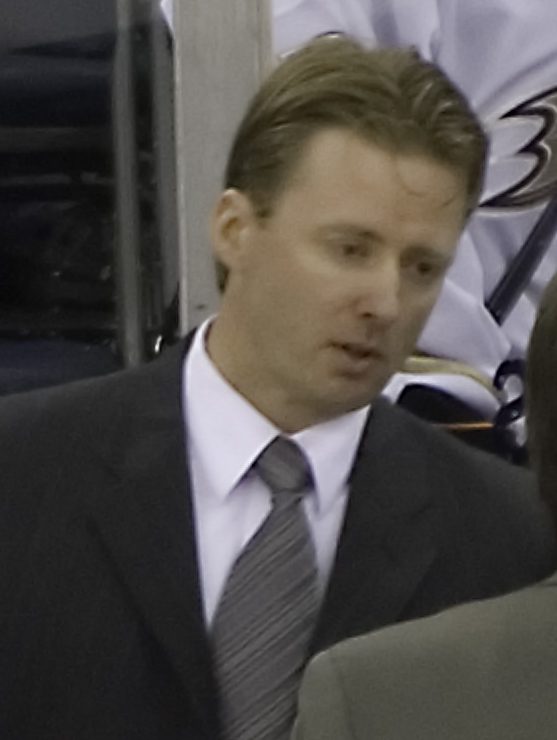
- Gulutzan in 2007
- Born: August 12, 1971 (age 55) The Pas, Manitoba, Canada
- Height: 5 ft 10 in (178 cm)
- Weight: 181 lb (82 kg; 12 st 13 lb)
- Position: Centre
- Shot: Left
- Played for: Fresno Falcons; Utah Grizzlies; Las Vegas Thunder
- Current NHL coach: Dallas Stars
- Coached for: Calgary Flames
- NHL draft: Undrafted
- Playing career: 1996–2003
- Coaching career: 2001–present

Glen Gulutzan (born August 12, 1971) is a Canadian professional ice hockey coach and former player who is the head coach for the Dallas Stars of the National Hockey League (NHL).

== Playing career ==
Gulutzan played junior hockey with the Moose Jaw Warriors, Brandon Wheat Kings and Saskatoon Blades of the Western Hockey League from 1986 to 1992. Gulutzan signed with the West Coast Hockey League's Fresno Falcons in 1996. During the 1996–97 campaign, Gulutzan saw short call ups with the Utah Grizzlies and the Las Vegas Thunder of the International Hockey League, while scoring 30 goals and 80 assists in 60 games with Fresno.

Following the 1996–97 season, Gulutzan left North America to play for Finnish team Sport in Mestis, the second-highest hockey league in Finland. Following his short 35-game stint in Finland, Gulutzan returned to Fresno in 1998. Gulutzan would spend his final five years of professional hockey play with Fresno, being named the team's player-assistant in the 2001–02 and 2002–03 seasons and winning the Bruce Taylor Cup as the WCHL playoff champions in 2002.

== Coaching career ==
Gulutzan was head coach and general manager of the ECHL's Las Vegas Wranglers from 2003 to 2009, leading the team to two division championships, one Brabham Cup and an appearance in the Kelly Cup Finals. During the 2005–06 season, Gulutzan was awarded the John Brophy Trophy as the league's best coach and in 2008, Gulutzan's Wranglers became the first team in the ECHL's 20-year history to have three-consecutive 100 point seasons. Gulutzan had been named the head coach of the National Conference All-Star team three-straight years, from 2006 to 2008, tying the ECHL record for most All-Star Game appearances by a coach.

In 2011, Gulutzan became the front runner for the Dallas Stars' head coaching vacancy following the team's dismissal of head coach Marc Crawford at the conclusion of the 2010–11 season and was named the head coach on June 16, 2011. He was relieved of his duties on May 14, 2013.

On July 24, 2013, it was announced that Gulutzan would be an assistant coach for the Vancouver Canucks.

On June 17, 2016, Gulutzan was announced as the new head coach of the Calgary Flames following the dismissal of Bob Hartley. On April 17, 2018, the Flames fired Gulutzan after the team missed the playoffs.

On May 25, 2018, Gulutzan was announced as an assistant coach of the Edmonton Oilers.

On July 1, 2025, Gulutzan was re-hired by the Stars for a second tenure as head coach, succeeding Peter DeBoer.

== Career statistics ==
=== Regular season and playoffs ===
			Regular season					Playoffs
Season	Team	League	GP	G	A	Pts	PIM	GP	G	A	Pts	PIM
1986–87	Moose Jaw Warriors	WHL	1	1	0	1	0	—	—	—	—	—
1987–88	Moose Jaw Warriors	WHL	6	1	0	1	2	—	—	—	—	—
1989–90	Brandon Wheat Kings	WHL	36	6	19	25	24	—	—	—	—	—
1990–91	Brandon Wheat Kings	WHL	72	24	50	74	21	—	—	—	—	—
1991–92	Saskatoon Blades	WHL	71	19	54	73	49	18	3	14	17	16
1992–93	University of Saskatchewan Huskies	CWUAA	28	8	28	36	18	—	—	—	—	—
1993–94	University of Saskatchewan Huskies	CWUAA	27	16	12	28	12	—	—	—	—	—
1996–97	Fresno Falcons	WCHL	60	30	80	110	52	5	0	9	9	8
1996–97	Utah Grizzlies	IHL	3	0	0	0	2	—	—	—	—	—
1996–97	Las Vegas Thunder	IHL	1	0	0	0	0	—	—	—	—	—
1997–98	Sport	Mestis	35	5	19	24	42	—	—	—	—	—
1998–99	Fresno Falcons	WCHL	50	32	34	66	50	7	4	3	7	4
1999–2000	Fresno Falcons	WCHL	70	22	60	82	29	5	1	2	3	6
2000–01	Fresno Falcons	WCHL	63	18	48	66	40	5	1	0	1	6
2001–02	Fresno Falcons	WCHL	53	25	22	47	49	—	—	—	—	—
2002–03	Fresno Falcons	WCHL	52	13	41	54	73	13	5	10	15	10

== Head coaching record ==
=== NHL ===
Team	Year	Regular season						Postseason		
Team	Year	G	W	L	OTL	Pts	Finish	W	L	Result
DAL	2011–12	82	42	35	5	89	4th in Pacific	—	—	Missed playoffs
DAL	2012–13	48	22	22	4	48	5th in Pacific	—	—	Missed playoffs
CGY	2016–17	82	45	33	4	94	4th in Pacific	0	4	Lost in first round (ANA)
CGY	2017–18	82	37	35	10	84	5th in Pacific	—	—	Missed playoffs
DAL	2025–26	82	50	20	12	112	2nd in Central	2	4	Lost in first round (MIN)
Total		376	196	145	35			2	8	

=== Minor leagues ===
Team	Year	Regular season						Postseason			
Team	Year	G	W	L	T	Pts	Finish	W	L	Win %	Result
Las Vegas Wranglers (ECHL)
Las Vegas Wranglers (ECHL)	2003–04	72	43	22	7	93	2nd in Pacific	2	3	.400	Lost in Division Semifinals
Las Vegas Wranglers (ECHL)	2004–05	72	31	33	8	70	7th in West	—	—	—	Missed playoffs
Las Vegas Wranglers (ECHL)	2005–06	72	53	13	6	112	2nd in West	6	7	.462	Lost in Division Finals
Las Vegas Wranglers (ECHL)	2006–07	72	46	12	14	106	1st in Pacific	6	4	.600	Lost in Conference Semifinals
Las Vegas Wranglers (ECHL)	2007–08	72	47	13	12	106	1st in Pacific	14	7	.667	Lost in Kelly Cup Finals
Las Vegas Wranglers (ECHL)	2008–09	73	34	31	6	76	2nd in Pacific	8	10	.444	Lost in Conference Finals
Texas Stars (AHL)	2009–10	80	46	27	7	99	2nd in West	14	10	.583	Lost in Calder Cup Finals
Texas Stars (AHL)	2010–11	80	41	29	10	92	4th in West	2	4	.333	Lost in West Division Finals
Total		593	341	180	70			52	45	.536	

Sporting positions
Preceded by Marc Crawford; Peter DeBoer	Head coach of the Dallas Stars; 2011–2013; 2025–present	Succeeded by Lindy Ruff; Incumbent
Preceded by Bob Hartley	Head coach of the Calgary Flames; 2016–2018	Succeeded by Bill Peters
