= John Devaney (ice hockey) =

Canadian ice hockey player (1958–2024)

- Born: April 10, 1958 Edmonton, Alberta, Canada
- Died: August 31, 2024 (aged 66)
- Position: Centre
- Shot: Right
- Played for: Team Canada; EHC Visp
- National team: Canada
- Playing career: 1976–1981

John Devaney (April 10, 1958 – August 31, 2024) was a Canadian ice hockey player. He played with Team Canada at the 1980 Winter Olympics. Devaney led the team in scoring, with four goals and three assists in six games.

== Career ==
Before the Olympics, he was an all-star and two-time national champion with the University of Alberta Golden Bears hockey team. Later, he played one season in Switzerland with EHC Visp, scoring 27 goals and 16 assists in 34 games.

He continued in hockey as a coach at his university (where he received a B.Comm.) and junior hockey before becoming a chartered accountant.

== Death ==
Devaney died on August 31, 2024, at the age of 66.
