= Stelio Zupancich =

Canadian ice hockey player

- Born: April 7, 1958 (age 66); Toronto, Ontario, Canada
- Height: 5 ft 9 in (175 cm)
- Weight: 184 lb (83 kg; 13 st 2 lb)
- Position: Left wing
- Shot: Left
- Played for: Team Canada
- National team: Canada
- Playing career: 1979–1980

Stelio Zupancich (born April 7, 1958) is a Canadian former ice hockey player. He represented Canada at the 1980 Winter Olympics held in Lake Placid, where he scored one goal and three assists in six games.

He also played OHL hockey with the Toronto Marlboros and Oshawa Generals. He finished his career playing for the Toronto Varsity Blues, twice an all star and elected to the school's Sports Hall of Fame.

After hockey, he had career with the Toronto-Dominion Bank, becoming a real estate vice-president, and is married to Trish. They have a son, named Leonard.
