= Jacques Thibault =

Canadian speed skater

Personal information
- Born: 13 February 1958 (age 68) Quebec City, Quebec, Canada

Sport
- Sport: Speed skating

Jacques Thibault (born 13 February 1958) is a Canadian speed skater. He competed at the 1980 Winter Olympics and the 1984 Winter Olympics.
