= Paul MacLean (ice hockey) =

French-born Canadian ice hockey player and coach

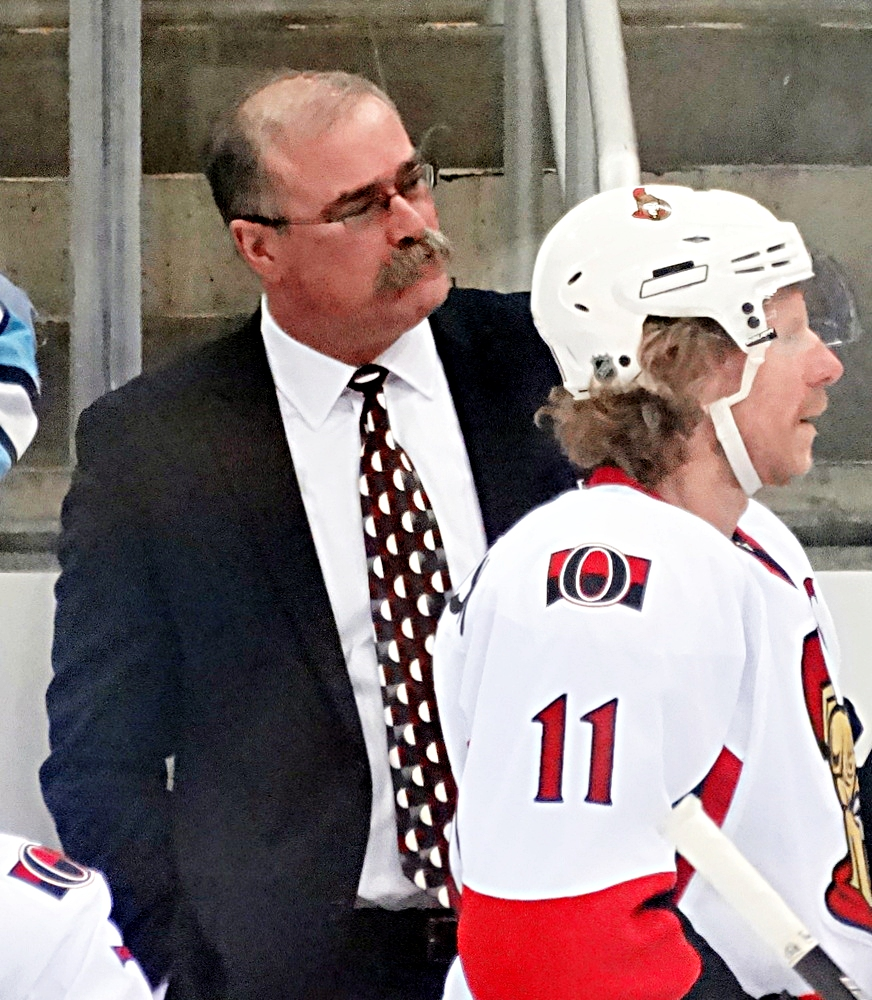
- MacLean (left) with the Ottawa Senators in May 2013
- Born: March 9, 1958 (age 68) Grostenquin, France
- Height: 188 cm (6 ft 2 in)
- Weight: 99 kg (218 lb; 15 st 8 lb)
- Position: Right wing
- Shot: Right
- Played for: St. Louis Blues; Winnipeg Jets; Detroit Red Wings
- Coached for: Ottawa Senators
- NHL draft: 109th overall, 1978; St. Louis Blues
- Playing career: 1980–1991
- Coaching career: 1993–2021

Paul A. MacLean (born March 9, 1958) is a French-born Canadian professional ice hockey coach and former player. He is the former assistant coach of the NHL's Toronto Maple Leafs, and former head coach of the NHL's Ottawa Senators, winning the 2013 Jack Adams Award as the NHL's Coach of the Year. He also served as an assistant coach for the Anaheim Ducks until his departure from the team on June 1, 2017. He played 11 seasons in the NHL with the St. Louis Blues, Detroit Red Wings and the original Winnipeg Jets.

== Playing career ==
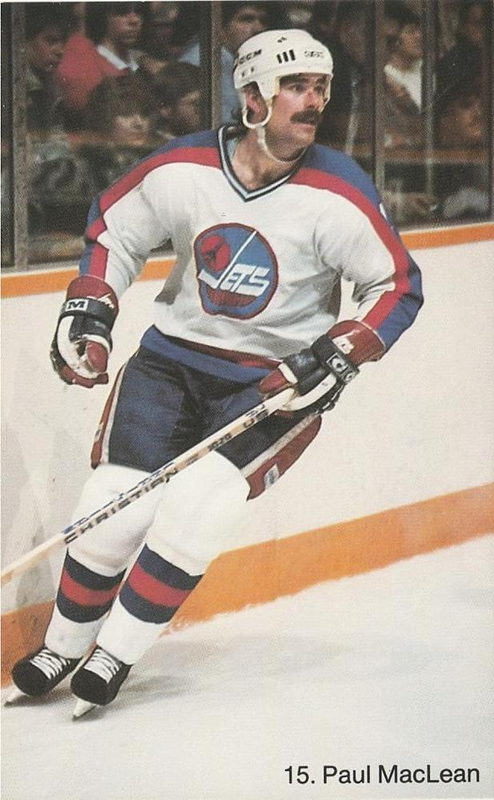
1983 photo of MacLean for Winnipeg Jets

Born in Grostenquin, France, while his father was serving with the Canadian Armed Forces, MacLean moved to Canada at the age of two and grew up in Antigonish, Nova Scotia.

As a youth, he played in the 1971 Quebec International Pee-Wee Hockey Tournament with a minor ice hockey team from Borden. Once, during a QMJHL game in which he was playing for the Hull Olympiques, a deal was made to send MacLean to the Quebec Remparts, but the trade was called off before the game ended, after he had scored five goals. In the 1978–79 season, MacLean led the Dalhousie University Tigers to the AUHC championship with 12 goals, 17 assists and 71 penalty minutes in 18 games.

MacLean was drafted by the NHL's St. Louis Blues. He next represented Team Canada internationally at the 1980 Winter Olympics, held in Lake Placid, New York. The experience helped MacLean to excel when he finally did crack the NHL — he scored 36 goals in his rookie season after being traded to the Winnipeg Jets. He continued to enjoy success in Winnipeg on a line with Dale Hawerchuk, tallying three 30-goal seasons and three 40-goal seasons before being dealt to the Detroit Red Wings in exchange for Brent Ashton.

MacLean was a member of the Campbell Conference All-Star Team in the 1985 NHL All-Star Game. After another 30-goal season for Detroit, he was traded back to St. Louis together with Adam Oates in exchange for Tony McKegney and Bernie Federko. In 1990–91, MacLean suffered a rib injury and retired after ten seasons with 324 goals and 349 assists for 673 points. His best season statistically was the 1984–85 season, where he scored 41 goals and 101 points. MacLean has the distinction of being the highest-scoring NHL player born in France, with 673 points. The second-highest scoring French-born player is Antoine Roussel (197 points) who moved to Canada as a teenager. MacLean ranks 3rd all-time in NHL shooting percentage at 21.4%

== Coaching career ==
Before becoming an NHL coach, MacLean served as the head coach of the Peoria Rivermen of the International Hockey League (IHL) from 1993 to 1996. For the 1996–97 season, he served as an assistant coach with the Phoenix Coyotes. From 1997 through 2000, MacLean returned to the IHL to serve as the head coach of the Kansas City Blades. From 2000 to 2002, he served as the head coach of the Quad City Mallards of the United Hockey League (UHL). In 2001, MacLean led the Mallards to the Colonial Cup Championship. The Mallards had a record of 112–27–9 (.787 winning percentage) in MacLean's two seasons behind the bench. MacLean was then hired as an assistant coach for the Mighty Ducks of Anaheim under Head Coach Mike Babcock. Babcock would bring MacLean with him to the Detroit Red Wings when he was hired to coach the Red Wings. In the 2007–08 NHL season, MacLean won the Stanley Cup as assistant coach of the Red Wings.

On June 14, 2011, the Ottawa Senators announced that MacLean had been hired for their head coaching job, his first head coaching job at the NHL level. On October 11, MacLean won his first NHL game as a head coach as the Senators defeated the Minnesota Wild 4–3 in a shootout.

On April 30, 2012, MacLean was named a finalist for the Jack Adams Award for NHL Coach of the Year alongside John Tortorella of the New York Rangers and Ken Hitchcock of the St. Louis Blues; Hitchcock would go on to win the award.

On May 17, 2013, MacLean was again nominated for the Jack Adams Award, his second in a row, alongside Bruce Boudreau of the Anaheim Ducks and Joel Quenneville of the Chicago Blackhawks. On June 14, 2013, MacLean was announced as the winner of the 2013 Jack Adams Award. On July 4, 2013, the Senators announced that MacLean had been signed to a three-year contract extension with the team.

On December 8, 2014, MacLean was fired from his position as head coach of the Senators as the team appeared poised to miss the playoffs. He was succeeded by Dave Cameron.

On June 30, 2015, MacLean was named the assistant coach of the Anaheim Ducks, working under head coach Bruce Boudreau.

On June 1, 2017, MacLean's contract with the Ducks expired, and was not renewed.

On November 21, 2019, the Columbus Blue Jackets announced that he has joined the organization as an Assistant Coach.

On September 25, 2020, MacLean was named the assistant coach of the Toronto Maple Leafs, working under head coach Sheldon Keefe. He then became a senior advisor to the team, until his departure upon the end of the 2021/22 NHL season.

== Personal life ==
MacLean and his wife Sharon have three children — A.J., David and Erin. A.J. played professional hockey from 2004 to 2013, including a two year stint as captain and player-coach of the Dundee Stars of the EIHL. He is currently an assistant coach with the Toronto Marlies of the AHL. David is currently a professional scout for the Montreal Canadiens. Paul's brother Jerome lives in Ottawa, as does his sister Karen. He has a summer home in Antigonish, Nova Scotia. MacLean was born at RCAF #2 Fighter Wing (the Wing on-Base Hospital Grostenquin) in, Lorraine, France, to Canadian parents while his father was stationed there as part of NATO's RCAF #1 Air Division in Western Europe.

Howard Cornfield, the former owner, president and general manager of the Quad City Mallards, said he hired MacLean on the spot after interviewing him in 2000. "He has a look to him and he looks you in the eye," said Cornfield. "It's hard to explain, but we came to call it 'The Grizz Look' as in grizzly bear. He looked you in the eye and you knew he was being very honest. He was speaking from the heart. He had incredible intensity and you walked away saying, 'This guy is serious.' When he came in and told me, 'I'm going to win you a championship,' you walked away knowing that this guy was going to do it."

== Career statistics ==
=== Regular season and playoffs ===
			Regular season					Playoffs
Season	Team	League	GP	G	A	Pts	PIM	GP	G	A	Pts	PIM
1975–76	Brockville Braves	CJHL	44	35	25	60	70	—	—	—	—	—
1976–77	Brockville Braves	CJHL	52	37	29	66	63	—	—	—	—	—
1977–78	Hull Olympiques	QMJHL	66	38	33	71	125	3	1	0	1	26
1978–79	Dalhousie University	AUS	18	12	17	29	71	—	—	—	—	—
1979–80	Canada	Intl	50	21	11	32	90	—	—	—	—	—
1980–81	Salt Lake Golden Eagles	CHL	80	36	42	78	160	17	11	5	16	47
1980–81	St. Louis Blues	NHL	1	0	0	0	0	1	0	0	0	0
1981–82	Winnipeg Jets	NHL	74	36	25	61	106	4	3	2	5	20
1982–83	Winnipeg Jets	NHL	80	32	44	76	121	3	1	2	3	6
1983–84	Winnipeg Jets	NHL	76	40	31	71	155	3	1	0	1	0
1984–85	Winnipeg Jets	NHL	79	41	60	101	119	8	3	4	7	4
1985–86	Winnipeg Jets	NHL	69	27	29	56	74	2	1	0	1	7
1986–87	Winnipeg Jets	NHL	72	32	42	74	75	10	5	2	7	16
1987–88	Winnipeg Jets	NHL	77	40	39	79	76	5	2	0	2	23
1988–89	Detroit Red Wings	NHL	76	36	35	71	118	5	1	1	2	8
1989–90	St. Louis Blues	NHL	78	34	33	67	100	12	4	3	7	20
1990–91	St. Louis Blues	NHL	37	6	11	17	24	—	—	—	—	—
NHL totals			719	324	349	673	968	53	21	14	35	104

=== International ===
Year	Team	Event	GP	G	A	Pts	PIM
1980	Canada	OG	6	2	3	5	6

== NHL coaching record ==
Team	Year	Regular season						Postseason			
Team	Year	G	W	L	OTL	Pts	Finish	W	L	Win %	Result
OTT	2011–12	82	41	31	10	92	2nd in Northeast	3	4	.429	Lost in Conference Quarterfinals (NYR)
OTT	2012–13	48	25	17	6	56	4th in Northeast	5	5	.500	Lost in Conference Semifinals (PIT)
OTT	2013–14	82	37	31	14	88	5th in Atlantic	—	—	—	Did not qualify
OTT	2014–15	27	11	11	5	(99)	(fired)	—	—	—	—
Total		239	114	90	35	—		8	9	.471	2 playoff appearances

Preceded by Cory Clouston	Head coach of the Ottawa Senators; 2011–2014	Succeeded by Dave Cameron
Preceded by Ken Hitchcock	Jack Adams Award; 2013	Succeeded by Patrick Roy
