= Serge Cantin =

Canadian bobsledder

Personal information
- Born: 7 August 1945 (age 79); Montreal, Quebec, Canada

Sport
- Sport: Bobsleigh

Serge Cantin (born 7 August 1945) is a Canadian bobsledder. He competed in the two man and the four man events at the 1980 Winter Olympics.
