= Ken Berry (ice hockey) =

Canadian ice hockey player (born 1960)

- Born: June 21, 1960 (age 65) Burnaby, British Columbia, Canada
- Height: 5 ft 8 in (173 cm)
- Weight: 175 lb (79 kg; 12 st 7 lb)
- Position: Left wing
- Shot: Left
- Played for: Edmonton Oilers; Vancouver Canucks
- National team: Canada
- NHL draft: 112th overall, 1980; Vancouver Canucks
- Playing career: 1980–1993

Kenneth Edward Berry (born June 21, 1960) is a Canadian former professional ice hockey winger.

== Early life ==
Berry was born in Burnaby, British Columbia. As a youth, he and teammate Glenn Anderson played in the 1972 Quebec International Pee-Wee Hockey Tournament with a minor ice hockey team from Burnaby. He played major junior hockey with the New Westminster Bruins, winning the Memorial Cup in 1978. He next played with the University of Denver Pioneers, where he was selected to the All-WCHA Second Team in 1980–81.

== Career ==
Berry played major professional hockey with the NHL's Edmonton Oilers and Vancouver Canucks, tallying 8 goals and 10 assists for 18 points in 55 games. He later played in West Germany/Germany, mostly in the second tier 2nd Eishockey-Bundesliga, with ESV Bayreuth and EC Hedos München.

Berry twice represented Canada in hockey at the Olympics, at the 1980 Winter Olympics held in Lake Placid and the 1988 Winter Olympics held in Calgary. At the 1980 Tournament, Berry scored a hat-trick in Canada's 10-1 victory over the Netherlands.

Berry retired from hockey after the 1992–93 Bundesliga season (his only season in Germany's top-level Eishockey-Bundesliga), returning to Canada to become a stockbroker. As of 2019, Berry is Chairman of Kootenay Silver Inc.

== Personal life ==
Berry is the younger brother of Doug Berry, who also played in the NHL and the Eishockey-Bundesliga.

In November 2022, Berry was elected to a four-year term as mayor of Lions Bay, British Columbia, Canada.

== Career statistics ==
=== Regular season and playoffs ===
			Regular season					Playoffs
Season	Team	League	GP	G	A	Pts	PIM	GP	G	A	Pts	PIM
1977–78	Bellingham Blazers	BCHL	65	57	73	130	124	—	—	—	—	—
1977–78	New Westminster Bruins	WCHL	5	0	0	0	0	6	3	4	7	2
1978–79	University of Denver	WCHA	39	17	20	37	52	—	—	—	—	—
1979–80	Canadian National Team	Intl	57	19	20	39	48	—	—	—	—	—
1980–81	University of Denver	WCHA	40	22	34	56	84	—	—	—	—	—
1980–81	Wichita Wind	CHL	9	7	6	13	13	17	2	4	6	28
1981–82	Edmonton Oilers	NHL	15	2	3	5	9	—	—	—	—	—
1981–82	Wichita Wind	CHL	58	28	29	57	70	7	3	3	6	28
1982–83	Moncton Alpines	AHL	76	24	26	50	80	—	—	—	—	—
1983–84	Edmonton Oilers	NHL	13	2	3	5	10	—	—	—	—	—
1983–84	Moncton Alpines	AHL	53	18	20	38	75	—	—	—	—	—
1984–85	Nova Scotia Oilers	AHL	71	30	27	57	40	6	2	2	4	2
1985–86	ESV Bayreuth	FRG.2	33	27	25	52	88	—	—	—	—	—
1985–86	Canadian National Team	Intl	8	1	2	3	20	—	—	—	—	—
1986–87	Canadian National Team	Intl	52	17	27	44	60	—	—	—	—	—
1987–88	Canadian National Team	Intl	67	20	19	39	51	—	—	—	—	—
1987–88	Vancouver Canucks	NHL	14	2	3	5	6	—	—	—	—	—
1988–89	Vancouver Canucks	NHL	13	2	1	3	5	—	—	—	—	—
1988–89	Milwaukee Admirals	IHL	5	4	4	8	2	—	—	—	—	—
1989–90	EC Hedos München	1.GBun	36	24	33	57	70	3	2	0	2	2
1990–91	EC Hedos München	1.GBun	43	26	17	43	68	4	1	1	2	8
1991–92	EC Hedos München	1.GBun	39	17	15	32	71	—	—	—	—	—
1992–93	EC Hedos München	1.GBun	29	4	5	9	58	6	6	5	11	8
NHL totals			55	8	10	18	30	—	—	—	—	—
AHL totals			200	72	73	145	195	6	2	2	4	2
1.GBun totals			147	71	70	141	267	13	9	6	15	18

=== International ===
Year	Team	Event	GP	G	A	Pts	PIM
1980	Canada	OG	6	4	1	5	8
1988	Canada	OG	8	2	4	6	4
Senior totals			14	6	5	11	12

== Awards and honors ==
Award	Year
All-WCHA Second Team	1980–81
