= Dan D'Alvise =

Canadian ice hockey player

- Born: December 13, 1955 (age 69); Toronto, Ontario, Canada
- Height: 6 ft 1 in (185 cm)
- Weight: 194 lb (88 kg; 13 st 12 lb)
- Position: Centre
- Shot: Left
- Played for: Team Canada; HC Merano
- National team: Canada
- NHL draft: 179th overall, 1975; Toronto Maple Leafs
- Playing career: 1979–1982

Daniel D'Alvise (born December 13, 1955) is a Canadian former ice hockey player. He was a member of Team Canada at the 1980 Winter Olympics. He scored three goals and three assists in six games, including a game-tying goal in a closely fought 4–6 loss to the USSR.

Prior to the Olympics, he played with the Toronto Varsity Blues, and later with HC Merano of the Italian Hockey League.

His son, Chris D'Alvise, is also a professional hockey player. His older brother, Bob D'Alvise, played in the World Hockey Association with the Toronto Toros. After his hockey career, he became a rink manager in Etobicoke.
