= Ron Davidson =

Canadian ice hockey player

- Born: July 16, 1958 (age 67) Prince Albert, Saskatchewan, Canada
- Height: 6 ft 1 in (185 cm)
- Weight: 150 lb (68 kg; 10 st 10 lb)
- Position: Centre
- Shot: Left
- Played for: Team Canada; Frölunda HC; SC Langenthal
- National team: Canada
- Playing career: 1979–1983

Ronald Davidson (born July 16, 1958) is a Canadian former ice hockey player. He played with Team Canada at the 1980 Winter Olympics. Playing on a line with future NHLers Glenn Anderson and Jim Nill, he scored one goal and four assists in six games.

Ron graduated from Queen's University law school in 1982 and then played professional hockey in Sweden, Switzerland, and France for four years before starting his law career in 1986 in Ottawa. He remained active in hockey as assistant at Howie Meeker's hockey schools and later as director of hockey programming for the Ottawa Senators.
