= Robert Wilson (bobsleigh) =

Canadian bobsledder

Personal information
- Born: 13 September 1954 (age 70); Montreal, Quebec, Canada

Sport
- Sport: Bobsleigh

Robert Wilson (born 13 September 1954) is a Canadian bobsledder. He competed at the 1980 Winter Olympics and the 1984 Winter Olympics.
