= Don Spring =

Venezuelan-born Canadian ice hockey player

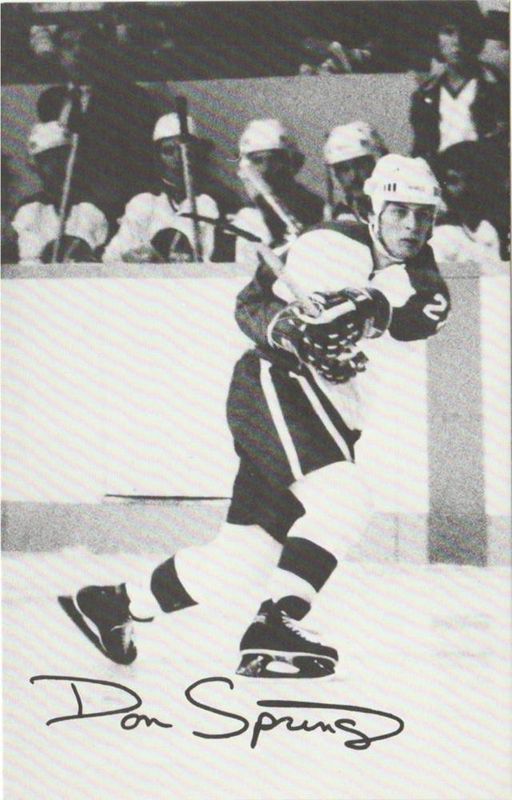
- Spring in 1980 postcard
- Born: June 15, 1959 (age 67) Maracaibo, Venezuela
- Height: 5 ft 11 in (180 cm)
- Weight: 194 lb (88 kg; 13 st 12 lb)
- Position: Defence
- Shot: Left
- Played for: Winnipeg Jets; EHC Essen-West
- National team: Canada
- NHL draft: Undrafted
- Playing career: 1979–1985

Donald Neil Spring (born June 15, 1959) is a Venezuelan-born Canadian former ice hockey defenceman.

Spring was born in Maracaibo, Venezuela and raised in Edson, Alberta.

Spring was a two-time national champion with the University of Alberta Golden Bears hockey team. Spring represented Canada at the 1980 Winter Olympics held in Lake Placid, where he scored one assist in six games.

Spring started his National Hockey League career with the Winnipeg Jets in 1980. He would play his entire career with the Jets. He would leave the NHL after the 1984 season. Spring still holds the record for the most career games in the NHL (259) by a player with only one career goal.

He finished his hockey career with one season with EHC Essen-West in West Germany. Presently he is president of Spring Fuel Distributors Inc. in Kelowna, B.C.

== Career statistics ==
=== Regular season and playoffs ===
| | | | Regular season | | | | | Playoffs |
| Season | Team | League | GP | G | A | Pts | PIM | GP | G | A | Pts | PIM |
|---|---|---|---|---|---|---|---|---|---|---|---|---|
| 1976–77 | University of Alberta | CIAU | 34 | 1 | 6 | 7 | 24 | — | — | — | — | — |
| 1977–78 | University of Alberta | CIAU | 30 | 6 | 14 | 20 | 12 | — | — | — | — | — |
| 1978–79 | University of Alberta | CIAU | 42 | 7 | 29 | 36 | 27 | — | — | — | — | — |
| 1979–80 | Canadian National Team | Intl | 51 | 1 | 23 | 24 | 20 | — | — | — | — | — |
| 1980–81 | Winnipeg Jets | NHL | 80 | 1 | 18 | 19 | 18 | — | — | — | — | — |
| 1981–82 | Winnipeg Jets | NHL | 78 | 0 | 16 | 16 | 21 | 4 | 0 | 0 | 0 | 4 |
| 1982–83 | Winnipeg Jets | NHL | 80 | 0 | 16 | 16 | 37 | 2 | 0 | 0 | 0 | 6 |
| 1983–84 | Winnipeg Jets | NHL | 21 | 0 | 4 | 4 | 4 | — | — | — | — | — |
| 1983–84 | Sherbrooke Jets | AHL | 50 | 0 | 17 | 17 | 21 | — | — | — | — | — |
| 1984–85 | EHC Essen-West | GER | 36 | 8 | 19 | 27 | 32 | 18 | 3 | 13 | 16 | 12 |
| NHL totals | | | 259 | 1 | 54 | 55 | 80 | 6 | 0 | 0 | 0 | 10 |

=== International ===
| Year | Team | Event | GP | G | A | Pts | PIM |
|---|---|---|---|---|---|---|---|
| 1980 | Canada | OLY | 6 | 0 | 1 | 1 | 0 |
| Senior totals | | | 6 | 0 | 1 | 1 | 0 |
