= Kevin Primeau =

Canadian ice hockey player (born 1955)

- Born: January 3, 1955 (age 71) Edmonton, Alberta, Canada
- Height: 6 ft 0 in (183 cm)
- Weight: 180 lb (82 kg; 12 st 12 lb)
- Position: Right wing
- Shot: Right
- Played for: Team Canada; Vancouver Canucks (NHL); Edmonton Oilers (WHA)
- National team: Canada
- NHL draft: Undrafted
- Playing career: 1977–1981

Kevin Primeau (born January 3, 1955, in Edmonton, Alberta) is a retired professional ice hockey winger. He played two games in the National Hockey League (NHL) with the Vancouver Canucks and seven games in the World Hockey Association (WHA) for the Edmonton Oilers.

== Early life ==
Primeau was born in Edmonton. In university, he played for the University of Alberta Golden Bears from 1974–75 to 1977–78; the Golden Bears won the national CIAU University Cup championship in 1975 and 1978, with Primeau winning the Major W.J. "Danny" McLeod Award in 1978, as Most Valuable Player of the national championship tournament.

== Career ==
Primeau played seven games in the World Hockey Association with the Edmonton Oilers. Primeau represented Canada at the 1980 Winter Olympics where he scored four goals and one assist in six games. He later served as the head coach of the Swiss team HC La Chaux-de-Fonds. He also was the head coach of the Hungarian team Alba Volán Székesfehérvár, and the Hungary national team.

== Personal life ==
Primeau's son Josh plays professionally in the Swiss League with HC Sierre, and his other son Ben was the captain of the Fernie Ghostriders in the KIJHL.

== Career statistics ==
=== Regular season and playoffs ===
			Regular season					Playoffs
Season	Team	League	GP	G	A	Pts	PIM	GP	G	A	Pts	PIM
1974–75	University of Alberta	CIAU	33	12	15	27	23	—	—	—	—	—
1975–76	University of Alberta	CIAU	34	10	10	20	29	—	—	—	—	—
1976–77	University of Alberta	CIAU	34	20	14	34	49	—	—	—	—	—
1977–78	University of Alberta	CIAU	25	13	16	29	36	—	—	—	—	—
1977–78	Edmonton Oilers	WHA	7	0	1	1	2	2	0	0	0	2
1978–79	HC Davos	NLB	30	26	23	49	—	—	—	—	—	—
1979–80	EHC Visp	NLB	—	—	—	—	—	—	—	—	—	—
1979–80	Canadian National Team	Intl	41	16	11	27	18	—	—	—	—	—
1980–81	Vancouver Canucks	NHL	2	0	0	0	4	—	—	—	—	—
1980–81	Dallas Black Hawks	CHL	45	14	9	23	22	—	—	—	—	—
1981–82	EHC Visp	NLB	38	39	19	58	—	—	—	—	—	—
1982–83	EHC Visp	NLB	37	25	18	43	—	—	—	—	—	—
1983–84	SC Langenthal	NLB	—	—	—	—	—	—	—	—	—	—
1983–84	Sherbrooke Jets	AHL	30	2	1	3	6	—	—	—	—	—
WHA totals			7	0	1	1	2	—	—	—	—	—
NHL totals			2	0	0	0	0	—	—	—	—	—

=== International ===
Year	Team	Event	GP	G	A	Pts	PIM
1980	Canada	Oly	6	4	1	5	6
Senior totals			6	4	1	5	6
