= Brad Pirie =

Canadian ice hockey player

- Born: October 21, 1955 (age 69); Guelph, Ontario, Canada
- Height: 5 ft 10 in (178 cm)
- Weight: 176 lb (80 kg; 12 st 8 lb)
- Position: Defence
- Played for: Team Canada
- National team: Canada
- Playing career: 1976–1980

J. Bradley Pirie (born October 21, 1955) is a Canadian former ice hockey player. He played with Team Canada at the 1980 Winter Olympics.

== Early life ==
Pirie was born in Guelph. He played with the University of Guelph Gryphons, where he was an all-star and later inducted into the University of Guelph Sports Hall of Fame. Next, he played for the Peterborough Petes and represented Canada at the 1974 World Junior Ice Hockey Championships.

== Career ==
Pirie represented Canada at the 1980 Winter Olympics held in Lake Placid, where he scored one goal and two assists in six games. After earning a bachelor's degree in economics from the University of Guelph, he joined his father's company, Pirie-McKie & Associates.

== Personal life ==
Pirie married Laura and has three children and two grandchildren. He currently resides in Toronto, Ontario.
