= Marc Crawford =

Canadian professional ice hockey coach

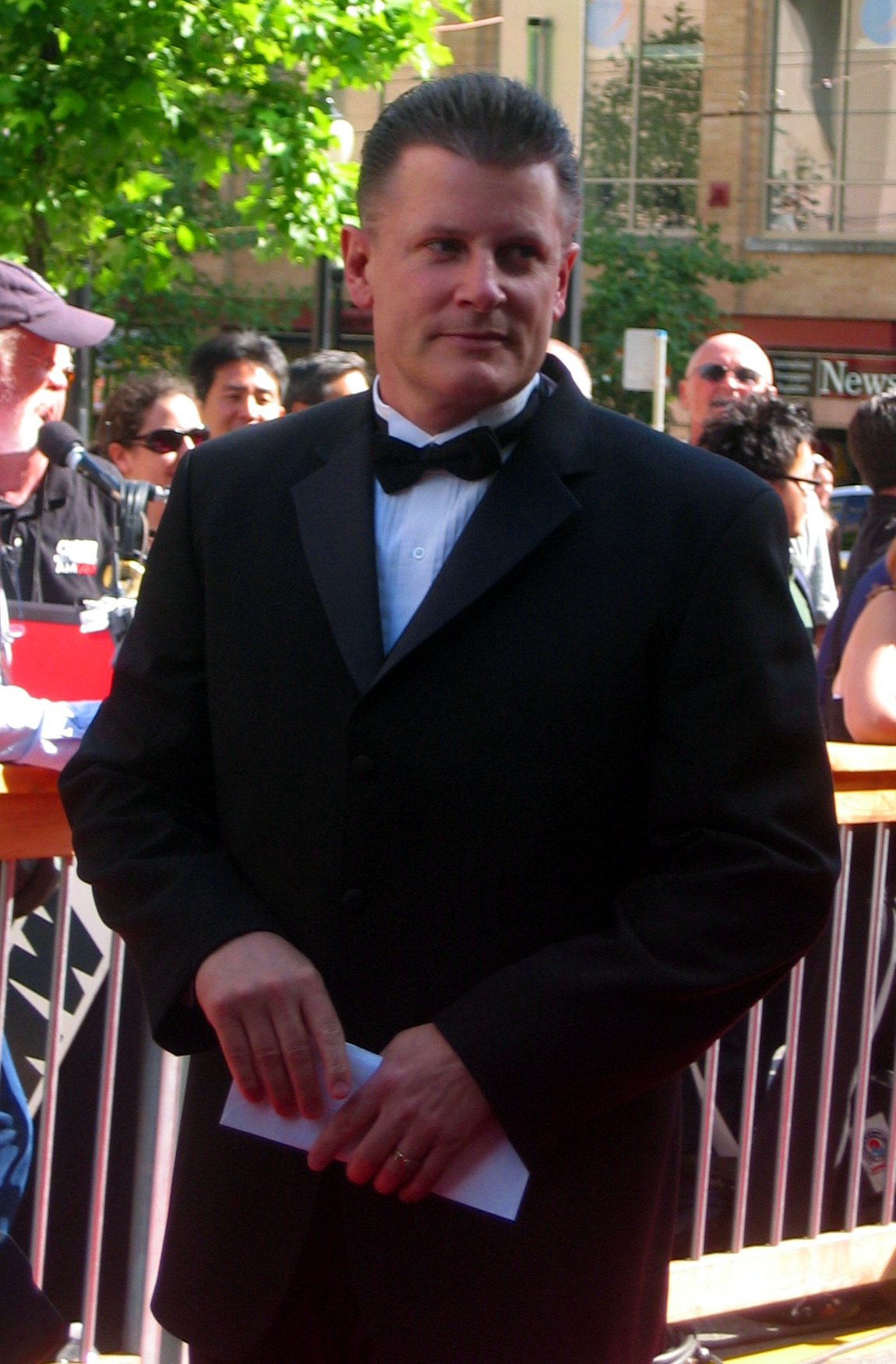
- Crawford in 2006
- Born: February 13, 1961 (age 65) Belleville, Ontario, Canada
- Height: 5 ft 11 in (180 cm)
- Weight: 185 lb (84 kg; 13 st 3 lb)
- Played for: Vancouver Canucks
- Coached for: Quebec Nordiques; Colorado Avalanche; Vancouver Canucks; Los Angeles Kings; Dallas Stars; Ottawa Senators; ZSC Lions
- NHL draft: 70th overall, 1980; Vancouver Canucks
- Playing career: 1981–1989
- Coaching career: 1989–present

Marc Joseph John Crawford (born February 13, 1961) is a Canadian former professional ice hockey player and coach. He played as a forward for the Vancouver Canucks in the National Hockey League (NHL). Crawford won the Stanley Cup in 1996 as head coach of the Colorado Avalanche in the NHL. He has also been the head coach of the Quebec Nordiques, Vancouver Canucks, Los Angeles Kings, Dallas Stars, and interim head coach of the Ottawa Senators. He has also coached in Switzerland, having two tenures at the helm of the ZSC Lions, at the international level, as head coach of Team Canada at the 1998 Winter Olympics. Crawford has won the Louis A. R. Pieri Memorial Award as coach of the year in the American Hockey League and the Jack Adams Award as coach of the year in the NHL. His 556 wins as coach is 26th best among all NHL coaches.

== Early life ==
Crawford was born in Belleville, Ontario. He is the son of professional hockey player Floyd Crawford. He is the brother of National Hockey League (NHL) hockey players Bob Crawford and Lou Crawford.

== Playing career ==
Crawford played three seasons of major junior in the Quebec Major Junior Hockey League (QMJHL) with the Cornwall Royals. During this time, the team won back-to-back Memorial Cups and Crawford was named the team's captain. Crawford was drafted by the Vancouver Canucks in the 1980 NHL entry draft in the fourth round, 70th overall. He joined the Canucks in 1981–82. As a rookie, Crawford was a part of Vancouver's 1982 run to the Stanley Cup finals, in which the Canucks were defeated by the New York Islanders.

During his six seasons in the NHL, Crawford would split time between Vancouver and their American Hockey League (AHL) affiliate, the Fredericton Express. As a result of constantly flying between the two cities, which are over 5,000 kilometres (3,100 mi) apart, he earned the nickname "747", though most contemporary Canucks fans know him as "Crow", a nickname coined during his tenure as a head coach with the team. In total, Crawford tallied 19 goals, 31 assists and 50 points in 176 games during his NHL career, all of it with Vancouver. After a season in the International Hockey League with the Milwaukee Admirals, Crawford retired as a professional player.

== Coaching career ==
=== Early coaching career ===
Crawford was named a playing assistant coach with Fredericton during the 1987–88 season. During the 1988–89 season Crawford joined the Milwaukee Admirals as an assistant coach. He became a head coach in the Ontario Hockey League (OHL) with the Cornwall Royals, for whom he had previously played in the QMJHL. After two seasons with Cornwall, Crawford moved to the AHL, and in his first season with the St. John's Maple Leafs, he took his team to the 1992 Calder Cup finals, losing to the Adirondack Red Wings. The following season, Crawford was awarded the Louis A. R. Pieri Memorial Award as the AHL's coach of the year.

In 1994–95, Crawford broke into the NHL with the Quebec Nordiques and as a result of the Nordiques' improved play, he won the NHL's Jack Adams Award as coach of the year. He is the youngest NHL coach and first rookie coach in history to win the Jack Adams. The next season, the Nordiques franchise was relocated to Colorado as the Avalanche, and Crawford won his first and only Stanley Cup as a coach in 1996, defeating the Florida Panthers in four games in the finals.

Crawford continued to post successful regular seasons with the Avalanche in the next two seasons, but after an early first-round exit in the 1998 playoffs, he resigned on May 27, 1998. Despite reportedly being offered a one-year contract extension by general manager Pierre Lacroix, Crawford decided to "move on and accept a new challenge".

Before his resignation with the Avalanche, Crawford was also the head coach of the Canadian Olympic hockey team at the 1998 Olympics, where they finished a disappointing fourth. Many questioned his choice of players to take part in the semi-final shootout with the Czech Republic, in which they lost, electing not to use future Hall of Famers Wayne Gretzky or Steve Yzerman.

=== Vancouver Canucks ===
After a brief stint as a colour commentator on Hockey Night in Canada, Crawford replaced Mike Keenan as head coach of the Vancouver Canucks midway through the 1998–99 season. Joining Vancouver in the midst of a rebuilding period for the franchise, Crawford slowly developed the Canucks into a successful regular season team, playing a fast-paced and offensively emphasized style of play. After one-and-a-half seasons, he led Vancouver back to the playoffs. However, the Canucks were defeated in the first round by his former team, Colorado.

In 2002–03, Vancouver continued to improve under Crawford and posted a franchise record (since surpassed) of 104 points. The following season, they took the Northwest Division title from the Avalanche, who had finished first in their division every season since they won the Northeast Division during their last season playing in Quebec. Despite Vancouver's regular season success, they only managed to win one playoff series during Crawford's tenure. After the Canucks' failure to make the playoffs in the 2005–06 season, Crawford's position as head coach was terminated by management on April 25, 2006. He was replaced by Alain Vigneault.

In six-and-a-half seasons' work with the Canucks, Crawford marked himself as the longest-serving and winningest head coach in franchise history at the time of his exit, coaching 529 games and 246 wins. On February 3, 2006, one of his last games in Vancouver, he also became the third-youngest head coach in NHL history to reach 400 wins. At 48 years and 342 days, this mark trails only Scotty Bowman and Glen Sather.

=== Later years ===
Nearly one month after being fired by Vancouver, Crawford was hired by the Los Angeles Kings, a team in a similar situation to that of the Canucks when Crawford first joined them. On June 10, 2008, Crawford was fired by the Kings, although he had one year remaining on his initial contract. He lasted only two years with the Kings, who thought a change was necessary in the coaching position. During his two seasons with the Kings, he missed the playoffs both times.

During the 2008–09 season, Crawford did colour commentary for Hockey Night in Canada late games alongside play-by-play announcer Mark Lee.

A year after being fired from the Los Angeles Kings, Crawford was hired by Dallas Stars general manager Joe Nieuwendyk to replace previous head coach Dave Tippett. The Stars fired Crawford on April 12, 2011, two days after the Stars' loss to the Minnesota Wild in the last game of the season, which ultimately cost the team the opportunity to capture the eighth playoff berth in the Western Conference. Crawford's tenure again only lasted two seasons.

In mid-2012, Crawford was named the new coach of the ZSC Lions of the Swiss National League A, having signed a two-year contract. He won the NLA championship with the Lions in the 2013–14 season. In March 2014, he signed a two-year contract extension. In early 2015, Crawford was responsible for convincing coveted draft prospect Auston Matthews to sign and play with the Lions for the 2015–16 season. Crawford was awed by Matthews' play during the 2015 U18 Championships and contacted Matthews' family and agent about a contract. Crawford would lead the Lions to winning the 2016 Swiss Cup. Crawford left ZSC when his contract expired in 2016. Besides winning the 2014 Swiss championship and 2016 Swiss Cup, he also guided the Lions to three NLA regular season championship titles, in 2013–14, 2014–15 and 2015–16.

In May 2016, following the hiring of Guy Boucher, Crawford was hired as associate coach for the Ottawa Senators. On March 1, 2019, Crawford became the interim head coach of the Senators following the firing of Guy Boucher for the rest of the 2018–19 season going 7–10–1. D. J. Smith was then hired as the Senators head coach for the 2019–20 season.

On June 4, 2019 the Chicago Blackhawks announced Crawford as an assistant coach to Jeremy Colliton. Colliton was fired by the Blackhawks during the 2021–22 season, but Crawford was retained as an assistant to interim-coach Derek King for the remainder of the season. In May 2022, Crawford was let go by the Blackhawks with a year remaining on his contract.

In December 2022, Crawford returned to Switzerland and the ZSC Lions, replacing fired coach Rikard Grönborg. In February 2023, Crawford was suspended for a game after an investigation by the National League into whether he had directed a homophobic slur at a referee. In the 2023–24 season he won the Swiss championship for a second time in his career.

The Lions were again leading the National League standings on December 30, 2024, when Crawford suddenly announced his resignation from the club, citing mental health reasons.

== Awards and achievements ==
- Louis A. R. Pieri Memorial Award (AHL coach of the year) – 1993
- Jack Adams Award (NHL coach of the year) – 1995
- Stanley Cup champion (Colorado Avalanche) – 1996
- Canada Olympic head coach – 1998

== Career statistics ==
=== Regular season and playoffs ===
			Regular season					Playoffs
Season	Team	League	GP	G	A	Pts	PIM	GP	G	A	Pts	PIM
1978–79	Cornwall Royals	QMJHL	70	28	41	69	206	7	4	2	6	36
1979–80	Cornwall Royals	QMJHL	54	27	36	63	127	18	8	20	28	48
1980–81	Cornwall Royals	QMJHL	63	42	58	100	242	19	20	15	35	27
1981–82	Vancouver Canucks	NHL	40	4	8	12	29	14	1	0	1	11
1981–82	Dallas Black Hawks	CHL	34	13	21	34	71	—	—	—	—	—
1982–83	Vancouver Canucks	NHL	41	4	5	9	28	3	0	1	1	25
1982–83	Fredericton Express	AHL	30	15	9	24	59	9	1	3	4	10
1983–84	Vancouver Canucks	NHL	19	0	1	1	9	—	—	—	—	—
1983–84	Fredericton Express	AHL	56	9	22	31	96	7	4	2	6	23
1984–85	Vancouver Canucks	NHL	1	0	0	0	4	—	—	—	—	—
1984–85	Fredericton Express	AHL	65	12	29	41	173	5	0	1	1	10
1985–86	Vancouver Canucks	NHL	54	11	14	25	92	3	0	1	1	8
1985–86	Fredericton Express	AHL	26	10	14	24	55	—	—	—	—	—
1986–87	Vancouver Canucks	NHL	21	0	3	3	67	—	—	—	—	—
1986–87	Fredericton Express	AHL	25	8	11	19	21	—	—	—	—	—
1987–88	Fredericton Express	AHL	43	5	13	18	90	2	0	0	0	14
1988–89	Milwaukee Admirals	IHL	53	23	30	53	166	11	2	5	7	26
AHL totals			245	59	98	157	494	23	5	6	11	57
NHL totals			176	19	31	50	229	20	1	2	3	44

=== International ===
Year	Team	Event	GP	G	A	Pts	PIM
1981	Canada	WJC	5	1	3	4	4
Junior totals			5	1	3	4	4

== Head coaching record ==
Team	Year	Regular season							Postseason			
Team	Year	G	W	L	T	OTL	Pts	Finish	W	L	Win %	Result
QUE	1994–95	48	30	13	5	—	65	1st in Northeast	2	4	.375	Lost in conference quarterfinals (NYR)
COL	1995–96	82	47	25	10	—	104	1st in Pacific	16	6	.727	Won Stanley Cup (FLA)
COL	1996–97	82	49	24	9	—	107	1st in Pacific	10	7	.588	Lost in conference finals (DET)
COL	1997–98	82	39	26	17	—	95	1st in Pacific	3	4	.429	Lost in conference quarterfinals (EDM)
QUE/COL total		294	165	88	41	—			31	21	.596	4 playoff appearances 1 Stanley Cup Championship
VAN	1998–99	37	8	23	6	—	22	4th in Northwest	—	—	—	Missed playoffs
VAN	1999–2000	82	30	29	15	8	83	4th in Northwest	—	—	—	Missed playoffs
VAN	2000–01	82	36	28	11	7	90	4th in Northwest	0	4	.000	Lost in conference quarterfinals (COL)
VAN	2001–02	82	42	30	7	3	94	2nd in Northwest	2	4	.333	Lost in conference quarterfinals (DET)
VAN	2002–03	82	45	23	13	1	104	2nd in Northwest	7	7	.500	Lost in conference semifinals (MIN)
VAN	2003–04	82	43	24	10	5	101	1st in Northwest	3	4	.429	Lost in conference quarterfinals (CGY)
VAN	2005–06	82	42	32	—	8	92	4th in Northwest	—	—	—	Missed playoffs
VAN total		529	246	189	62	32			12	19	.387	4 playoff appearances
LAK	2006–07	82	27	41	—	14	68	4th in Pacific	—	—	—	Missed playoffs
LAK	2007–08	82	32	43	—	7	71	5th in Pacific	—	—	—	Missed playoffs
LAK total		164	59	84	—	21			—	—	—	
DAL	2009–10	82	37	31	—	14	88	5th in Pacific	—	—	—	Missed playoffs
DAL	2010–11	82	42	29	—	11	95	5th in Pacific	—	—	—	Missed playoffs
DAL total		164	79	60	—	25			—	—	—	
OTT	2018–19	18	7	10	—	1	15	8th in Atlantic	—	—	—	Missed playoffs
OTT total		18	7	10	—	1			—	—	—	
Total		1,169	556	431	103	79			43	40	.518	8 playoff appearances 1 Stanley Cup Championship

== Moore incident ==
On February 16, 2004, when Crawford was coach of Vancouver, Colorado player Steve Moore concussed Vancouver captain Markus Näslund on a questionable hit. No penalty was called on the play, and the NHL later reviewed the incident and decided no penalty was warranted. However, Crawford was vocal about the incident and the failure of the NHL to respond. During another game against Colorado on March 8, 2004, Todd Bertuzzi grabbed and punched Moore from behind, and rode him into the ice, causing Moore to suffer three broken vertebrae and multiple facial lacerations, which ultimately ended his career. According to a Colorado player, Crawford was laughing at the situation at the time it occurred and was the subject of substantial criticism following the incident.

Crawford, along with Bertuzzi and the Canucks organization, were named as defendants in a $19+ million (US) lawsuit by Moore. According to the suit, following the February 16 incident, Crawford encouraged his players to seek revenge, which led in part to the injury to Moore. Specifically, Moore alleged that Crawford, Bertuzzi and former general manager Brian Burke entered into "an unlawful plan and agreement to assault, batter and injure Moore at a future date for the injuries that Näslund had suffered during the Feb. 16 game". The Canucks were fined US$250,000 by the NHL for "...failure to prevent the atmosphere that may have led to the incident". As the case approached trial in 2014, Moore increased the damages claim to $68 million. In August 2014, the lawsuit concluded with all parties agreeing to a confidential settlement.

== Abuse of players and apology ==
In December 2019, multiple former players Crawford coached in the past came forward with stories of abuse, including Brent Sopel, Patrick O'Sullivan, Harold Druken and Sean Avery. Sopel clarified it was not his intention "to make any allegations against anyone or any organization", and Avery also offered support for Crawford.

The Chicago Blackhawks suspended Crawford from his role as assistant coach following these allegations and opened an investigation. Crawford subsequently issued an apology to past players that brought forward stories of abuse.

Preceded by Pierre Pagé	Head coach of the Quebec Nordiques; 1994–95	Succeeded by Himself; Colorado Avalanche head coach
Preceded by Himself; Quebec Nordiques head coach	Head coach of the Colorado Avalanche; 1995–99	Succeeded by Bob Hartley
Preceded by Jacques Lemaire	Winner of the Jack Adams Award; 1995	Succeeded by Scotty Bowman
Preceded by Mike Keenan	Head coach of the Vancouver Canucks; 1999–2006	Succeeded by Alain Vigneault
Preceded by John Torchetti	Head coach of the Los Angeles Kings; 2006–2008	Succeeded by Terry Murray
Preceded by Dave Tippett	Head coach of the Dallas Stars; 2009–2011	Succeeded by Glen Gulutzan
Preceded by Guy Boucher	Head coach of the Ottawa Senators; 2019 (interim)	Succeeded by D. J. Smith
