= Joe Grant (ice hockey) =

Canadian ice hockey player

- Born: January 23, 1957; Niagara Falls, Ontario, Canada
- Died: January 5, 2011 (aged 53)
- Height: 5 ft 11 in (180 cm)
- Weight: 181 lb (82 kg; 12 st 13 lb)
- Position: Defence
- Played for: Team Canada; Modo Hockey
- National team: Canada
- Playing career: 1979–1984

Donald Norman Joseph Grant (January 23, 1957 – January 5, 2011) is a Canadian former ice hockey player. He played with Team Canada at the 1980 Winter Olympics.

A member of the 1977-78 Varsity Blues OUAA championship team, Grant came to the University of Toronto in 1977 after successful junior hockey careers with the Buffalo Tondas, St. Catharines Black Hawks and the Kitchener Rangers. Grant was named an OUAA first-team all-star defenceman in his second year of intercollegiate competition.

Grant was selected to the national hockey team in 1979 and went on to represent Canada at the 1980 Winter Olympics, where he scored one assist and two penalty minutes in six games. Before returning to finish his degree at the University of Toronto, he played one year for Modo in the Swedish Elite League and was a player-coach for one year in Tokyo.

He arrived back in Toronto in 1982-83 and led the Blues to a first-place regular-season finish and OUAA silver medal. Grant then took to the national stage once again, where he was named the best defenceman at the Pravda Cup tournament in Leningrad, Russia.

Grant participated in the inaugural Canadian Olympic Academy (COA) in Calgary (1983) and was a member of the Canadian delegation to the International Olympic Academy in Archaia Olympia (1984). He served as a member of the COA athlete selection committee in 1986-1987.

The Sports Hall of Fame honoured U of T's greatest athletes and builders in 2010. It was established by the T-Holders' Association in 1987 as part of an ongoing effort to preserve and display the records relating to the historical tradition of athletic, academic, and community leadership fostered by the University of Toronto.
