= Kevin Maxwell (ice hockey) =

Canadian ice hockey player

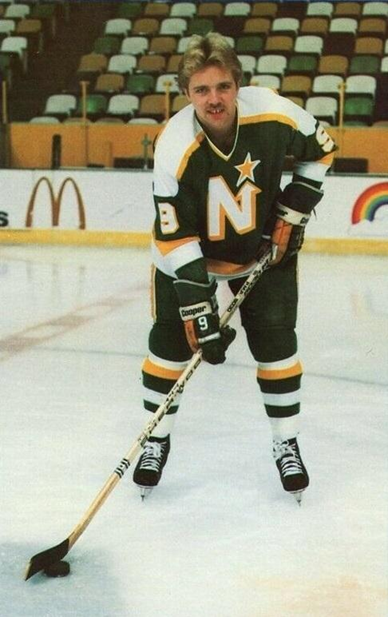
- Born: March 30, 1960 (age 66) Edmonton, Alberta, Canada
- Height: 5 ft 9 in (175 cm)
- Weight: 165 lb (75 kg; 11 st 11 lb)
- Position: Center
- Shot: Right
- Played for: Colorado Rockies; Minnesota North Stars; New Jersey Devils
- National team: Canada
- NHL draft: 63rd overall, 1979; Minnesota North Stars
- Playing career: 1976–1988

Kevin Preston Maxwell (born March 30, 1960) is a Canadian former professional ice hockey forward who played 49 games in the National Hockey League (NHL) for the Colorado Rockies, Minnesota North Stars, and New Jersey Devils. Later Maxwell scouted for the Dallas Stars, New York Islanders and Philadelphia Flyers. He was the director of Pro Scouting for the New York Rangers for 15 years before taking the General Manager position for the St. Louis Blues American Hockey League affiliate, the Springfield Thunderbirds.

== Early life ==
Maxwell was born in Edmonton. He played junior hockey with the Penticton Vees and in college with the University of North Dakota Fighting Sioux men's ice hockey team (now North Dakota Fighting Hawks).

== Career ==
Maxwell represented Canada at the 1980 Winter Olympics held in Lake Placid. In six games he scored 5 assists with 4 penalty minutes.

His NHL career spanned three seasons and 66 games, scoring six goals and 15 assists, with 61 penalty minutes. During the 1981 Stanley Cup playoffs and the North Stars finals run, he played 16 games and contributed three goals, four assists, and dogged defensive play.

As of 2022, he is the general manager of the Springfield Thunderbirds of the AHL.

== Career statistics ==
=== Regular season and playoffs ===
			Regular season					Playoffs
Season	Team	League	GP	G	A	Pts	PIM	GP	G	A	Pts	PIM
1976–77	Penticton Vees	BCJHL	67	63	82	145	135	—	—	—	—	—
1977–78	Penticton Vees	BCJHL	43	53	65	118	101	—	—	—	—	—
1978–79	University of North Dakota	WCHA	42	31	51	82	79	—	—	—	—	—
1979–80	Canadian National Team	Intl	57	31	51	82	79	—	—	—	—	—
1980–81	Oklahoma City Stars	CHL	31	8	13	21	38	—	—	—	—	—
1980–81	Minnesota North Stars	NHL	6	0	3	3	7	16	3	4	7	24
1981–82	Nashville South Stars	CHL	5	4	2	6	6	—	—	—	—	—
1981–82	Minnesota North Stars	NHL	12	1	4	5	8	—	—	—	—	—
1981–82	Colorado Rockies	NHL	34	5	5	10	44	—	—	—	—	—
1982–83	Wichita Wind	CHL	68	24	41	65	47	—	—	—	—	—
1983–84	Maine Mariners	AHL	56	21	27	48	59	17	5	11	16	36
1983–84	New Jersey Devils	NHL	14	0	3	3	2	—	—	—	—	—
1984–85	Maine Mainers	AHL	52	25	21	46	70	11	7	7	14	4
1985–86	Maine Mariners	AHL	49	14	17	31	77	5	2	1	3	9
1986–87	Hershey Bears	AHL	56	12	20	32	139	3	1	0	1	30
1987–88	Hershey Bears	AHL	77	36	49	85	55	12	3	5	8	20
AHL totals			245	59	98	157	494	23	5	6	11	57
AHL totals			290	108	134	242	400	48	18	24	42	99
NHL totals			66	6	15	21	61	16	3	4	7	24

=== International ===
Year	Team	Event	GP	G	A	Pts	PIM
1980	Canada	OLY	6	0	5	5	4
Senior totals			6	0	5	5	4

== Awards and honors ==
Award	Year
All-WCHA First Team	1978–79
AHCA West All-American	1978–79

Awards and achievements
Preceded by Greg Whyte	WCHA Freshman of the Year; 1978–79	Succeeded by Aaron Broten
