= Vaughn Karpan =

Canadian ice hockey player and executive

- Born: June 20, 1961 (age 65) Flin Flon, Manitoba, Canada
- Height: 6 ft 0 in (183 cm)
- Weight: 172 lb (78 kg; 12 st 4 lb)
- Position: Left wing
- Shot: Left
- National team: Canada
- NHL draft: Undrafted
- Playing career: 1983–1988

Vaughn Karpan (born June 20, 1961) is a Canadian former ice hockey player. He is currently the assistant general manager - player personnel for the Vegas Golden Knights.

Karpan played with the Canada men's national ice hockey team from 1983 to 1988. He competed with Team Canada at the 1984 and 1988 Winter Olympics.

After retiring from his playing career, Karpan was hired by the Winnipeg Jets as an amateur scout in 1993. He joined the scouting staff of the Arizona Coyotes in 1996 and served as the team's director of amateur scouting from 1999 to 2005. In 2005, Karpan was hired as a scout by the Montreal Canadiens. On May 27, 2015, the Canadiens announced that Karpan had been named as their director of professional scouting.

Karpan was hired by the Golden Knights on August 23, 2016, whom he would later win the Stanley Cup with in 2023.

== Career statistics ==
=== Regular season and playoffs ===
| | | | Regular season | | | | | Playoffs |
| Season | Team | League | GP | G | A | Pts | PIM | GP | G | A | Pts | PIM |
|---|---|---|---|---|---|---|---|---|---|---|---|---|
| 1979–80 | Brandon Wheat Kings | WHL | 26 | 5 | 2 | 7 | 4 | — | — | — | — | — |
| 1981–82 | New Westminster Royals | BCHL | 33 | 30 | 37 | 67 | 50 | — | — | — | — | — |
| 1983–84 | Canadian National Team | Intl | 31 | 5 | 6 | 11 | 6 | — | — | — | — | — |
| 1983–84 | University of Manitoba | CWUAA | 8 | 9 | 12 | 21 | 14 | — | — | — | — | — |
| 1984–85 | University of Manitoba | CWUAA | 34 | 27 | 22 | 49 | 87 | — | — | — | — | — |
| 1985–86 | Canadian National Team | Intl | 46 | 9 | 11 | 20 | 20 | — | — | — | — | — |
| 1986–87 | Canadian National Team | Intl | 69 | 17 | 16 | 33 | 21 | — | — | — | — | — |
| 1987–88 | Canadian National Team | Intl | 67 | 13 | 15 | 28 | 19 | — | — | — | — | — |
| Intl totals | | | 213 | 44 | 48 | 92 | 66 | — | — | — | — | — |

=== International ===
| Year | Team | Event | GP | G | A | Pts | PIM |
|---|---|---|---|---|---|---|---|
| 1984 | Canada | OG | 7 | 0 | 0 | 0 | 0 |
| 1988 | Canada | OG | 8 | 0 | 0 | 0 | 2 |
| Senior totals | | | 15 | 0 | 0 | 0 | 2 |
