= Dave Tippett =

Canadian ice hockey player and coach

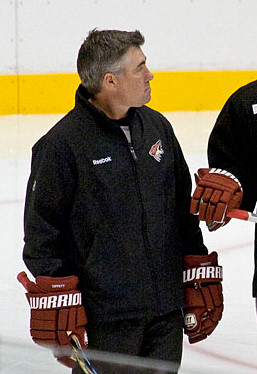
- Tippett in 2010
- Born: August 25, 1961 (age 65) Moosomin, Saskatchewan, Canada
- Height: 5 ft 10 in (178 cm)
- Weight: 180 lb (82 kg; 12 st 12 lb)
- Position: Left wing
- Shot: Left
- Played for: Hartford Whalers; Washington Capitals; Pittsburgh Penguins; Philadelphia Flyers
- Coached for: Houston Aeros; Dallas Stars; Arizona Coyotes; Edmonton Oilers
- National team: Canada
- NHL draft: Undrafted
- Playing career: 1983–1995
- Coaching career: 1994–2022
Medal record
Men's ice hockey
Silver medal – second place	1992 Albertville	Ice hockey

David G. Tippett (born August 25, 1961) is a Canadian former professional ice hockey coach and player. As of 2026, he was serving as an advisor to the Seattle Kraken and Kraken coach Lane Lambert.

Tippett played in the NHL from 1983 to 1994 as a winger for the Hartford Whalers, Pittsburgh Penguins, Philadelphia Flyers and Washington Capitals. He also served as head coach of the Dallas Stars from May 21, 2002 until June 10, 2009, and for the Phoenix/Arizona Coyotes from September 24, 2009 until June 22, 2017. As head coach of the Coyotes, Tippett won the Jack Adams Award as NHL Coach of the Year in 2010. He was the head coach of the Edmonton Oilers from 2019 to 2022.

== Playing career ==
=== Prince Albert Raiders (1979–1981) ===
Tippett began playing with the Prince Albert Raiders of the Saskatchewan Junior Hockey League (SJHL) in the 1979–80 season. In his first year with the team, Tippett scored 53 goals and 125 points in 60 games. In the playoffs, he continued with the very strong offensive numbers, scoring 19 goals and 40 points in 25 games.

Tippett returned to the Raiders for the 1980–81 season, and once again had an excellent season, scoring 42 goals and 110 points in 60 games. In 24 playoff games, he had 20 goals and 45 points.

=== University of North Dakota (1981–1983) ===
After two seasons with the Raiders, Tippett joined the University of North Dakota Fighting Sioux of the Western Collegiate Hockey Association (WCHA). In his first season with the team in 1981–82, Tippett 13 goals and 41 points in 43 games. Tippett was the captain of the team, as they won the Frozen Four championship.

He played a second season with the Fighting Sioux in 1982–83, improving his offensive numbers to 15 goals and 46 points in 36 games with North Dakota.

=== Hartford Whalers (1984–1990) ===
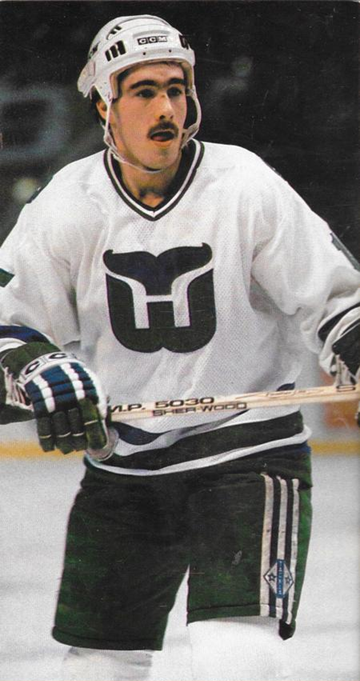
1985 photo of Tippett for Hartford Whalers

Tippett finished the 1983–84 season with the Whalers, playing in 17 games and registering four goals and six points.

Tippett spent the entire 1984–85 season in Hartford, appearing in all 80 games, scoring seven goals and 19 points, though the Whalers failed to qualify for the 1985 Stanley Cup playoffs.

The 1985–86 season saw Tippett once again appear in all 80 games with the Whalers, as he improved his offensive totals to 14 goals and 34 points, helping the team into the 1986 playoffs. In his first post-season experience in the NHL, Tippett had two goals and four points in ten games as Hartford eventually lost in the second round of the playoffs to the Montreal Canadiens.

The Whalers won the Adams Division in 1986–87, as Tippett chipped in with nine goals and 31 points while playing in all 80 games again. In the 1987 playoffs, the Whalers were upset in six games in the first round to the Quebec Nordiques, as Tippett was held to two assists in the series.

In 1987–88, Tippett improved his numbers from the previous season, scoring 16 goals and 37 points, playing in all 80 games for the club. In six playoff games, Tippett was held pointless.

Tippett had his best offensive season in 1988–89, as he scored a career high 17 goals and 41 points, appearing in all 80 games again for Hartford, helping them into the playoffs. In four post-season games, Tippett had an assist.

In 1989–90, Tippett saw his offensive totals fall to only eight goals and 27 points, his lowest totals since his first full NHL season, while appearing in 66 games, the first time in his career that he missed any games due to injuries. In seven playoff games, Tippett had a goal and four points.

On September 30, 1990, the Whalers traded Tippett to the Washington Capitals for the Capitals' sixth-round draft pick in the 1992 NHL entry draft.

=== Washington Capitals (1990–1992) ===
In Tippett's first season with the Capitals, in 1990–91, he played in 61 games, scoring only six goals and 15 points, his lowest totals since 1983–84. Tippett had a solid playoff performance, however, scoring two goals and five points in ten games, helping the Capitals to the second round of the playoffs.

In 1991–92, Tippett appeared in only 30 games, scoring two goals and 12 points. He left the team to join Team Canada for the 1992 Winter Olympics held in Albertville, France. In seven games with Canada, Tippett had a goal and three points as the Canadians won the silver medal. Tippett returned to the Capitals for the rest of the regular season, and in seven playoff games, Tippett had an assist.

=== Pittsburgh Penguins (1992–1993) ===
After the 1991–92 campaign, Tippett became a free agent and on August 25, 1992, he signed a one-year contract with the two-time defending Stanley Cup champions, the Pittsburgh Penguins. He later revealed that he primarily signed with the Penguins in order to try and win a Stanley Cup.

In 1992–93, Tippett had his best offensive season since 1989–90, as he scored six goals and 25 points in 74 games, helping the Penguins win the Presidents' Trophy. In the playoffs, Tippett had a goal and five points in 12 games as Pittsburgh lost to the New York Islanders in the second round.

=== Philadelphia Flyers (1993–1994) ===
Tippett became a free agent after his season with the Penguins and on August 30, 1993, he was signed by the Philadelphia Flyers. Tippett appeared in 73 games with the Flyers in the 1993–94 season, scoring four goals and 15 points, however, the team failed to qualify for the playoffs.

=== Houston Aeros (1994–1995) ===
Tippett once again became a free agent at the end of his lone season with Philadelphia and, knowing of the impending 1994–95 NHL lockout and with a young family at home, decided to retire from playing. He would subsequently sign with the Houston Aeros of the International Hockey League (IHL) to serve as an assistant coach. As an expansion team, the Aeros were finding difficulty attracting talent, and management offered Tippett the potential to serve as a player-coach with Houston, while increasing his pay from $35,000 to $75,000 for these added responsibilities. In the 1994–95 season, Tippett, as a player-coach, played in 75 games with the Aeros, scoring 18 goals and 66 points. In four playoff games, he had a goal and three points.

Tippett was anticipating returning to the Aeros lineup the next season, but having recognized wear on his body during a team practice, found himself unable to play and announced his retirement as a player on September 22, 1995. In 721 career NHL games, Tippett scored 93 goals and 262 points in a career lasting from 1983 to 1994.

== International play ==
Tippett spent the 1983–84 hockey season with Team Canada, where he appeared in 66 games, scoring 14 goals and 33 points. Tippett played for Canada at the 1984 Winter Olympics in Sarajevo, Yugoslavia, scoring a goal and gathering an assist in seven games.

== Coaching career ==
=== Houston Aeros (1994–1999) ===
Tippett was a player-assistant coach with the Aeros during the 1994–95 season, however, after he decided to retire from playing, he began the 1995–96 season as just an assistant coach with the team, as was his original intentions when first joining Houston the previous season. After the Aeros started off the season with a 12–27–3 record, the team fired Head Coach Terry Ruskowski and named Tippett as his replacement. Tippett guided the Aeros to a 17–18–5 record, though the team failed to make the playoffs.

In 1996–97, Tippett began his first full season as head coach of the club, as the Aeros improved to a 44–30–8 record, earning 94 points, which was a 28-point improvement over the previous season. In the playoffs, the Aeros quickly swept the Las Vegas Thunder in three games, followed by a five-game series win over the San Antonio Dragons in the second round. Houston then lost to the Long Beach Ice Dogs in the Western Conference finals in five games.

The Aeros had a very solid season in 1997–98, as the team went 50–22–10, earning 110 points, which was a 16-point improvement over the previous season. In the playoffs, however, Houston was upset by the Milwaukee Admirals in four games. In his final two years as Aeros head coach, he also served as the team's general manager.

Tippett returned to Houston for the 1998–99, and the team finished with the best record in the league, going 54–15–13, getting 121 points. In the playoffs, the heavily favoured Aeros had a bye in the first round, followed by a close best-of-five series against the Long Beach Ice Dogs, in which Houston prevailed with a win in the decisive Game 5. In the Western Conference Finals, the Chicago Wolves took the Aeros to seven games, with Houston winning the seventh game 4–1 to advance the team to the 1999 Turner Cup Finals. In the final round, the Aeros faced the Orlando Solar Bears, and in a series that once again went the limit, the Aeros defeated Orlando in Game 7 by a 5–3 score to capture the championship. Tippett was named the IHL Coach of the Year, while the Aeros won the Fred A. Huber Jr. Memorial Trophy for having the best record in the League during the regular season.

=== Los Angeles Kings (1999–2002) ===
After spending five years as an assistant coach and head coach of the Aeros, Tippett was hired as an assistant coach of the Los Angeles Kings by their new head coach, Andy Murray. In the 1999–2000 season, the Kings saw a 25-point improvement as the team went 39–27–12–4, helping the club make the 2000 Stanley Cup playoffs, where they were swept by the Detroit Red Wings in the first round.

The Kings had another successful season in 2000–01, as they went 38–28–13–3, getting 92 points, and a playoff position for the second straight season. In the post-season, the Kings defeated the heavily favoured Detroit Red Wings in six games in the first round, eventually losing a seven-game series against the Colorado Avalanche in the second round.

Los Angeles improved in the 2001–02 season, reaching 40 wins with a 40–27–11–4 record, earning 95 points. In a rematch against the Avalanche in the 2002 playoffs, the Kings once again lost in seven games, this time in the first round.

=== Dallas Stars (2002–2009) ===
On May 16, 2002, the Dallas Stars named Tippett as the new head coach of the team. The Stars were coming off a disappointing 2001–02, as the club failed to make the playoffs.

In his first season with the club in 2002–03, Tippett led the Stars to a 46–17–15–4 record, finishing in first place in the Pacific Division with 111 points, which represented a 21-point improvement over the previous year. In the first round of the 2003 playoffs, Dallas eliminated the Edmonton Oilers in six games, before losing in six games to the Mighty Ducks of Anaheim in the second round.

The Stars point total slipped in the 2003–04 season, as Dallas went 41–26–13–2, earning 97 points and a fifth-place finish in the Western Conference. In the first round of the post-season, the Stars lost in five games to the Colorado Avalanche.

The 2004–05 NHL lockout cancelled the entire season, but when NHL play resumed in 2005–06, Tippett led the Stars to a 53–23–6 record, earning 112 points, the second-highest total in the Conference and a 15-point increase over the last season. Dallas' playoff run ended quickly, however, as they were upset by Colorado in five games in the first round.

Tippett joined an exclusive club during the 2006–07, as he led the Stars to a 50–25–7 record, earning 107 points. He joined Mike Babcock (Detroit), Scotty Bowman (Montreal), Tom Johnson (Boston), Mike Keenan (Philadelphia), Glen Sather (Edmonton) and Fred Shero (Philadelphia) as head coaches who led their teams to back-to-back 50-win seasons. In the 2007 playoffs, the Stars fell to the Vancouver Canucks in seven games in the first round.

In 2007–08, the Stars once again had a great regular season, going 45–30–7, earning 97 points and finishing in fifth place in the Conference. In the 2008 playoffs, Dallas defeated the defending Stanley Cup champion Anaheim Ducks in six games in the first round, followed by another six-game series victory over the San Jose Sharks in the second round. In the Western Conference Finals, the Stars faced the Detroit Red Wings, who ended the Stars' season after winning the series in six games.

Dallas had a tough season in 2008–09, as the team finished with a 36–35–11 record, earning 83 points and failing to make the 2009 playoffs. On June 10, 2009, the Stars fired Tippett as head coach, replacing him with Marc Crawford.

=== Phoenix/Arizona Coyotes (2009–2017) ===
On September 24, 2009, Tippett took over the coaching duties of the Phoenix Coyotes after Wayne Gretzky resigned from the position earlier that day. He took over a team that was facing a large amount of adversity about its future in Phoenix. During the previous season, Owner Jerry Moyes had secretly turned over operational control of the team to the NHL due to mounting losses. In May, Moyes tried to declare bankruptcy and sell the team to BlackBerry developer Jim Balsillie, who intended to move the team to Hamilton, Ontario. The NHL, however, successfully contended that Moyes and Balsillie had violated League rules, prompting them to take full control of the team.

In his first season with the Coyotes in 2009–10, the team overcame its off-ice troubles to finish with a club-record 50 wins, as they went 50–25–7, earning 107 points, a 28-point improvement over the 2008–09 season and helping the Coyotes to their first playoff berth since the 2001–02 season. Phoenix faced the Detroit Red Wings in the first round of the playoffs. Although the Coyotes had home-ice advantage for the first time since 1985 — when they were still the Winnipeg Jets — it was the Red Wings who came out victorious, defeating the Coyotes in seven games. After the season, Tippett won the Jack Adams Award as NHL Coach of the Year.

In 2010–11, Tippett led the Coyotes to the playoffs once again, as they had a 43–26–13 record, earning 99 points and sixth place in the Western Conference. Phoenix once again faced the Red Wings in the first round, however, and the Red Wings quickly ended the Coyotes' season with a four-game series sweep.

In 2011–12, Tippett led the Coyotes to the Pacific Division title — the franchise's first as an NHL team, and their first of any sort since the Jets won the 1978–79 World Hockey Association (WHA) regular-season title. With a 42–27–13 record and 97 points, they were the third seed in the Western Conference. They defeated the Chicago Blackhawks in six games for the franchise's first playoff series win since 1987. In the Western Conference Semi-finals, they defeated the Nashville Predators in five games, thus notching more playoff series wins than they had in their entire NHL history. Their run ended with a five-game loss to the eventual Stanley Cup champions, the Los Angeles Kings, in the Conference Finals.

The lockout-shortened, 48-game season in 2012–13 was a more difficult year for Tippett and the Coyotes. Racked with injuries and off-ice trouble, the team did not make playoffs for the first time during Tippett's tenure, finishing the season at 21–18–9, missing the post-season by five points. Despite the difficulties of the season the Coyotes re-signed Tippett to a long-term contract on June 21, 2013. In the 2014–15 season, the Coyotes finished in last place in the Western Conference, but Tippett was retained as head coach following the season.

On May 5, 2016, Tippett was signed to a five-year extension with the Coyotes to be Head Coach/Executive VP of Hockey Operations.

On June 22, 2017, Tippett parted ways with the Coyotes.

=== Edmonton Oilers (2019–2022) ===
On May 28, 2019, the Edmonton Oilers named Tippett as their head coach. He was fired in February 2022, after the team had won seven of their previous 23 games in the 2021–22 season, and poor performances in the previous two playoffs seasons.

== Management career ==
=== Seattle Kraken ===
In June 2018, Tippett was hired by the Seattle Kraken's ownership group as a senior adviser.

== Awards and honors ==
Award	Year
All-WCHA Second Team	1982–83

- 1999 – IHL Coach of the Year
- 2010 – Jack Adams Award

== Player statistics ==
=== Regular season and playoffs ===
			Regular season					Playoffs
Season	Team	League	GP	G	A	Pts	PIM	GP	G	A	Pts	PIM
1979–80	Prince Albert Raiders	SJHL	60	53	72	125	58	25	19	21	40	18
1980–81	Prince Albert Raiders	SJHL	60	42	68	110	64	24	20	25	45	22
1981–82	University of North Dakota	WCHA	43	13	28	41	20	—	—	—	—	—
1982–83	University of North Dakota	WCHA	36	15	31	46	24	—	—	—	—	—
1983–84	Canada	Intl	66	14	19	33	24	—	—	—	—	—
1983–84	Hartford Whalers	NHL	17	4	2	6	2	—	—	—	—	—
1984–85	Hartford Whalers	NHL	80	7	12	19	12	—	—	—	—	—
1985–86	Hartford Whalers	NHL	80	14	20	34	18	10	2	2	4	4
1986–87	Hartford Whalers	NHL	80	9	22	31	42	6	0	2	2	4
1987–88	Hartford Whalers	NHL	80	16	21	37	32	6	0	0	0	2
1988–89	Hartford Whalers	NHL	80	17	24	41	45	4	0	1	1	0
1989–90	Hartford Whalers	NHL	66	8	19	27	32	7	1	3	4	2
1990–91	Washington Capitals	NHL	61	6	9	15	24	10	2	3	5	8
1991–92	Canada	Intl	1	0	0	0	4	—	—	—	—	—
1991–92	Washington Capitals	NHL	30	2	10	12	16	7	0	1	1	0
1992–93	Pittsburgh Penguins	NHL	74	6	19	25	56	12	1	4	5	14
1993–94	Philadelphia Flyers	NHL	73	4	11	15	38	—	—	—	—	—
1994–95	Houston Aeros	IHL	75	18	48	66	56	4	1	2	3	4
NHL totals			721	93	169	262	317	62	6	16	22	34

=== International ===
Year	Team	Event	GP	G	A	Pts	PIM
1984	Canada	OLY	7	1	1	2	2
1992	Canada	OLY	7	1	2	3	10
Senior totals			14	2	3	5	12

== Head coaching record ==
Team	Year	Regular season							Postseason			
Team	Year	G	W	L	T	OTL	Pts	Finish	W	L	Win%	Result
DAL	2002–03	82	46	17	15	4	111	1st in Pacific	6	6	.500	Lost in Conference Semifinals (ANA)
DAL	2003–04	82	41	26	13	2	97	2nd in Pacific	1	4	.200	Lost in Conference Quarterfinals (COL)
DAL	2005–06	82	53	23	—	6	112	1st in Pacific	1	4	.200	Lost in Conference Quarterfinals (COL)
DAL	2006–07	82	50	25	—	7	107	3rd in Pacific	3	4	.429	Lost in Conference Quarterfinals (VAN)
DAL	2007–08	82	45	30	—	7	97	3rd in Pacific	10	8	.556	Lost in Conference Finals (DET)
DAL	2008–09	82	36	35	—	11	83	3rd in Pacific	—	—	—	Missed playoffs
DAL total		492	271	156	28	37			21	26	.447	5 playoff appearances
PHX	2009–10	82	50	25	—	7	107	2nd in Pacific	3	4	.429	Lost in Conference Quarterfinals (DET)
PHX	2010–11	82	43	26	—	13	99	3rd in Pacific	0	4	.000	Lost in Conference Quarterfinals (DET)
PHX	2011–12	82	42	27	—	13	97	1st in Pacific	9	7	.563	Lost in Conference Finals (LAK)
PHX	2012–13	48	21	18	—	9	51	4th in Pacific	—	—	—	Missed playoffs
PHX	2013–14	82	37	30	—	15	89	4th in Pacific	—	—	—	Missed playoffs
ARI	2014–15	82	24	50	—	8	56	7th in Pacific	—	—	—	Missed playoffs
ARI	2015–16	82	35	39	—	8	78	4th in Pacific	—	—	—	Missed playoffs
ARI	2016–17	82	30	42	—	10	70	6th in Pacific	—	—	—	Missed playoffs
PHX/ARI total		622	282	257	—	83			12	15	.444	3 playoff appearances
EDM	2019–20	71*	37	25	—	9	83	2nd in Pacific	1	3	.250	Lost in Qualifying Round (CHI)
EDM	2020–21	56	35	19	—	2	72	2nd in North	0	4	.000	Lost in First Round (WPG)
EDM	2021–22	44	23	18	—	3	(49)	(fired)	—	—	—	—
EDM total		171	95	62	—	14			1	7	.125	2 playoff appearances
Total		1,285	648	475	28	134			34	48	.415	10 playoff appearances

- Shortened season due to the COVID-19 pandemic during the 2019–20 season. Playoffs were played in August 2020 with a different format.

== Personal life ==
Tippett is married and has children and grandchildren. As of 2026, Tippett lives in Flagstaff, Arizona. He had previously lived for many years in Scottsdale, Arizona, but moved to Flagstaff as his primary residence due to the cooler weather. He is an avid fan and collector of motorcycles.

== See also ==
- List of NHL head coaches

Preceded by Claude Julien	Jack Adams Award; 2010	Succeeded by Dan Bylsma
Preceded by Rick Wilson	Head coach of the Dallas Stars; 2002–2009	Succeeded by Marc Crawford
Preceded by Wayne Gretzky	Head coach of the Phoenix/Arizona Coyotes; 2009–2017	Succeeded by Rick Tocchet
Preceded by Ken Hitchcock	Head coach of the Edmonton Oilers; 2019–2022	Succeeded by Jay Woodcroft
