= Warren Anderson (ice hockey) =

Canadian ice hockey player

- Born: April 13, 1952 (age 73) Toronto, Ontario, Canada
- Height: 5 ft 10 in (178 cm)
- Weight: 183 lb (83 kg; 13 st 1 lb)
- Position: Defence
- Shot: Left
- Played for: Team Canada; Zürcher SC (NLA)
- National team: Canada
- NHL draft: Undrafted
- Playing career: 1979–1984

Warren Anderson (born April 13, 1952) is a Canadian former professional ice hockey player. He played with Team Canada at the 1980 Winter Olympics and the 1984 Winter Olympics.

== Career ==
Prior to the Olympics, Anderson played with the Oshawa Generals and had an all-star, five-year stay with the Toronto Varsity Blues men's ice hockey team, winning four national championships. In 2013, he was inducted into the Toronto Varsity Blues Hall of Fame.

== Career statistics ==
=== Regular season and playoffs ===
			Regular season					Playoffs
Season	Team	League	GP	G	A	Pts	PIM	GP	G	A	Pts	PIM
1969–70	Oshawa Generals	OHA-Jr.	54	3	11	14	38	—	—	—	—	—
1970–71	Oshawa Generals	OHA-Jr.	61	4	16	20	43	—	—	—	—	—
1971–72	University of Toronto	OUA		2	10	12	33	—	—	—	—	—
1972–73	University of Toronto	OUA		5	15	20	10	—	—	—	—	—
1973–74	Orillia Terriers	OHA-Sr.	2	0	0	0	4	—	—	—	—	—
1973–74	University of Toronto	OUA						—	—	—	—	—
1974–75	University of Toronto	OUA	32	9	17	26		—	—	—	—	—
1975–76	Malmö IF	SWE.2	22	2	6	8		—	—	—	—	—
1976–77	University of Toronto	OUA						—	—	—	—	—
1979–80	Canada National Team	Intl						—	—	—	—	—
1980–81	Zürcher SC	SUI.2
1981–82	Zürcher SC	NDA		2	4	6		—	—	—	—	—
1983–84	Canada National Team	Intl	48	2	3	5	16	—	—	—	—	—
OUA totals			—	16	42	58	43	—	—	—	—	—

=== International ===
Year	Team	Event	GP	G	A	Pts	PIM
1980	Canada	OG	6	1	0	1	4
1984	Canada	OG	7	0	0	0	0
Senior totals			13	1	0	1	4
