= List of Minnesota Wild head coaches =

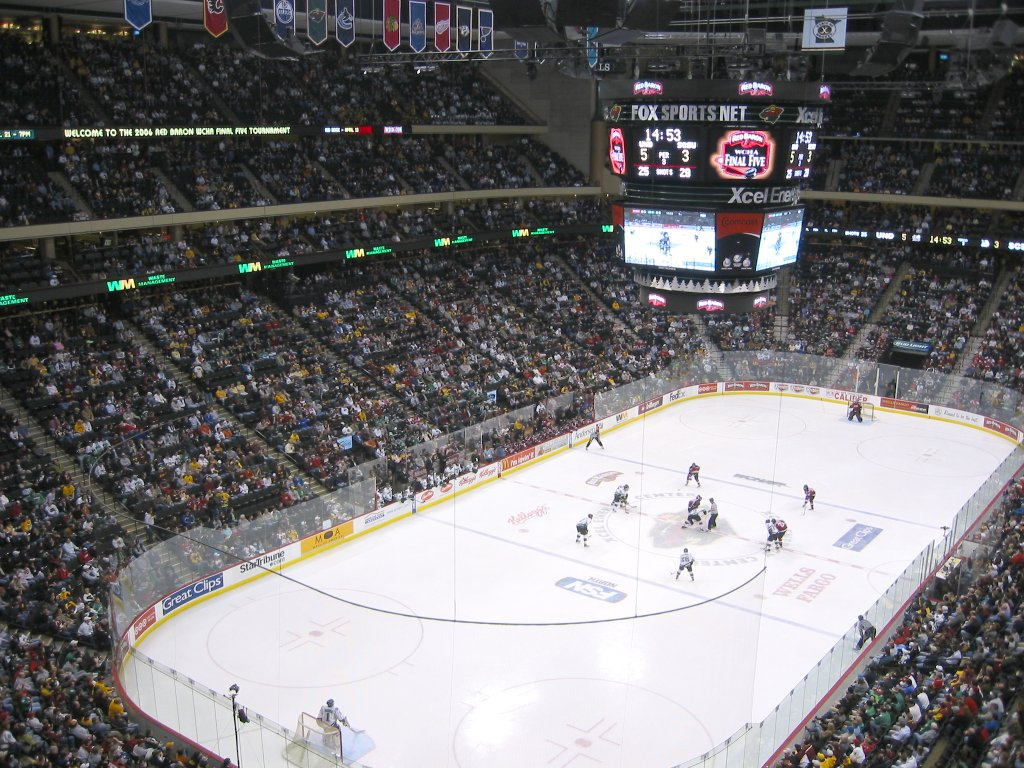
The Wild have played their home games at the Grand Casino Arena since its first season.

The Minnesota Wild is an American professional ice hockey team based in Saint Paul, Minnesota. It plays in the Central Division of the Western Conference in the National Hockey League (NHL). The Wild joined the NHL in 2000 as an expansion team with the Columbus Blue Jackets. The Wild have played their home games at the Grand Casino Arena since its first season. The majority of the Wild is owned by Craig Leipold, and Bill Guerin is their general manager.

There have been six head coaches for the Wild franchise. Jacques Lemaire, who coached the team from its inception to the end of the 2008–09 season, compiled a record of 574 regular-season games coached, 253 regular-season games won, 605 regular-season points, a .527 regular-season winning percentage, 29 playoff games coached, 11 playoff games won, and a .379 playoff winning percentage with the Wild. Lemaire was awarded the Jack Adams Award with the Wild in the 2002–03 season. Todd Richards was hired two months after Lemaire's resignation and fired in April 2011. Mike Yeo was hired by the club in June 2011 and fired in February 2016. John Torchetti was named interim head coach. On May 7, Bruce Boudreau was signed to a four-year deal as the new head coach, just 8 days after being released by the Anaheim Ducks.

On February 14, 2020, Bruce Boudreau was released by the Minnesota Wild following a disappointing first half of the 2019–20 season. This included Boudreau making a paperwork error that left the Wild with five defensemen in a game on January 15. Dean Evason was named as interim head coach, previously being assistant coach. On July 13, 2020, Evason was hired as the full-time head coach, with a contract extension through the 2021–22 season. Evason was later fired on November 27, 2023, after a poor start to the 2023–24 season, and John Hynes was named the new head coach.

== Key ==
#	Number of coaches^{[a]}
GC	Games coached
W	Wins = 2 points
L	Losses = 0 points
T	Ties = 1 point
OT	Overtime/shootout losses = 1 point^{[b]}
PTS	Points
P%	Points percentage
Win%	Winning percentage
*	Spent entire NHL head coaching career with the Wild

== Coaches ==
Note: Statistics are correct through the 2025–26 season.

#	Name	Term^{[c]}	Regular season						Playoffs				Achievements	Reference
#	Name	Term^{[c]}	GC	W	L	T/OT	PTS	P%	GC	W	L	Win%	Achievements	Reference
1	Jacques Lemaire	2000–2009	656	293	255	108	694	.529	29	11	18	.379	2002–03 Jack Adams Award winner	
2	Todd Richards	2009–2011	164	77	71	16	170	.518	—	—	—	—		
3	Mike Yeo	2011–2016	349	173	132	44	390	.559	28	11	17	.393		
4	John Torchetti	2016	27	15	11	1	31	.574	6	2	4	.333		
5	Bruce Boudreau	2016–2020	303	158	110	35	351	.579	10	2	8	.200		
6	Dean Evason	2020–2023	251	147	77	27	321	.639	23	8	15	.348		
7	John Hynes	2023–present	227	125	78	24	274	.604	6	2	4	.333		

== Notes ==
- ^{a} A running total of the number of coaches of the Wild. Thus, any coach who has two or more separate terms as head coach is only counted once.
- ^{b} Before the 2005–06 season, the NHL instituted a penalty shootout for regular season games that remained tied after a five-minute overtime period, which prevented ties.
- ^{c} Each year is linked to an article about that particular NHL season.
