= Mike Yeo =

Canadian ice hockey player and coach

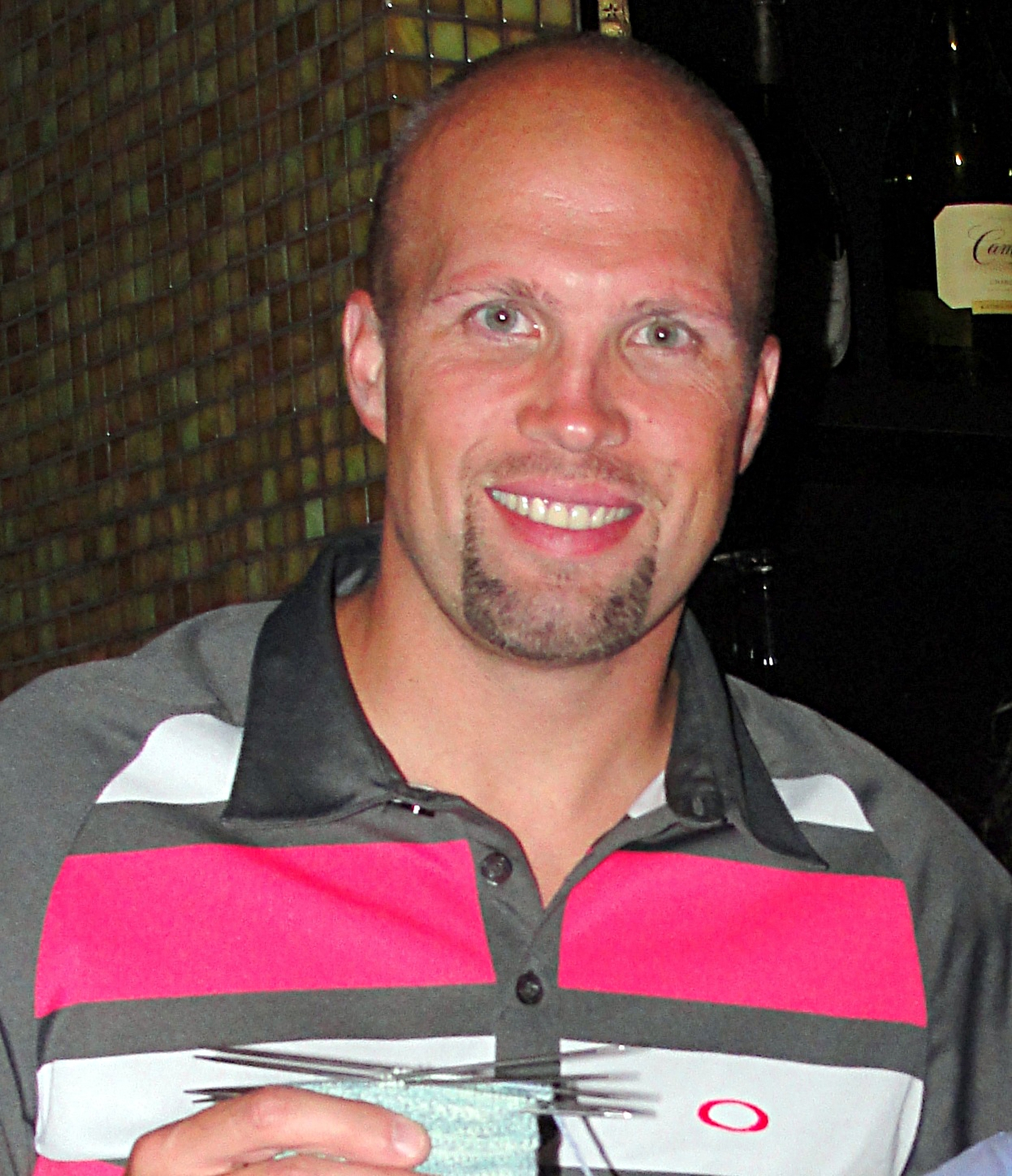
- Yeo in 2012
- Born: July 31, 1973 (age 53) Scarborough, Ontario, Canada
- Height: 6 ft 1 in (185 cm)
- Weight: 190 lb (86 kg; 13 st 8 lb)
- Position: Left wing
- Shot: Left
- Played for: Houston Aeros; WBS Penguins
- Coached for: Houston Aeros; Minnesota Wild; St. Louis Blues; Philadelphia Flyers
- Playing career: 1994–2000
- Coaching career: 2000–present

Michael Yeo (born July 31, 1973) is a Canadian professional ice hockey coach and former player. Yeo is currently an assistant coach with the Ottawa Senators of the National Hockey League (NHL). He is the former head coach of the Minnesota Wild and St. Louis Blues, as well as interim head coach of the Philadelphia Flyers in the NHL. Yeo grew up in North Bay, Ontario. He has also been an assistant coach for the Flyers, Pittsburgh Penguins, Vancouver Canucks, and head coach of the American Hockey League's Houston Aeros.

== Career ==
Yeo spent five seasons with the Houston Aeros while they were members of the International Hockey League (IHL). In 1998–99, he captained the team to the Turner Cup Championship.

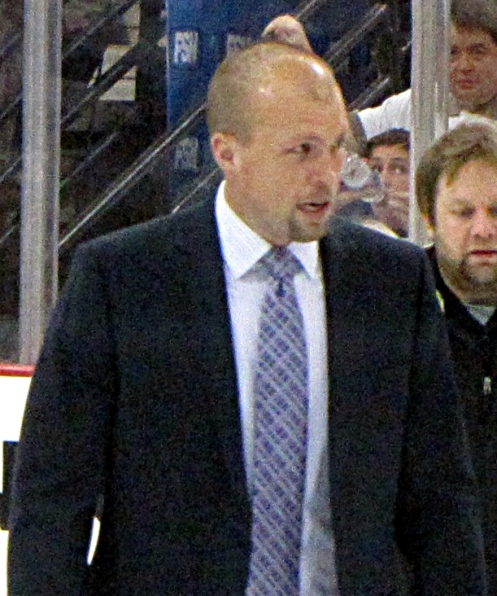
Mike Yeo with the Pittsburgh Penguins in the 2010 playoffs

In 1999, Yeo was signed as a minor league veteran by the Wilkes-Barre/Scranton Penguins, the top affiliate of the Pittsburgh Penguins at the onset of their inaugural season, in what would eventually become the first of eleven years of service with the Pittsburgh Penguins organization. After a serious knee injury ended his playing career after just 19 games with Wilkes-Barre/Scranton, Yeo accepted an offer to remain with the team by becoming an assistant to head coach Glenn Patrick, a position he continued to hold when Michel Therrien replaced Patrick in 2003. Yeo was promoted along with Therrien in 2005 to the Pittsburgh Penguins as Therrien's assistant after the firing of Eddie Olczyk and his coaching staff. With his primary responsibilities focused towards special teams, Yeo aided Therrien in laying the groundwork for the Penguins rebuild towards future successes, ending the franchise's six-year playoff absence in the 2006–07 season, and leading the Penguins to their second-highest points total in franchise history in 2007–08. Continuing to work as an assistant under Therrien's successor, Dan Bylsma, Yeo began to have health issues with his blood pressure and in one game "felt lightheaded and dizzy and had chest pain... [his] blood pressure was really high" although he persevered and helped the team to a Stanley Cup victory in 2009.

On June 16, 2010, Yeo left the Penguins to take up the vacant head coach position at the Houston Aeros of the American Hockey League (AHL), at that time the top AHL affiliate of the Minnesota Wild, replacing Kevin Constantine. The season prior to Yeo's hiring, the Aeros finished in last place in the West Division with low expectations. However, the Aeros added several offensive players such as Robbie Earl, Patrick O'Sullivan and Jed Ortmeyer. Under Yeo, the revitalized roster improved massively, reaching the AHL Calder Cup Finals in Yeo's first year behind the bench.

Yeo was announced as the head coach of the Minnesota Wild on June 17, 2011. The Wild under Yeo won their first game 4–2 at home against the Columbus Blue Jackets. The Wild started the season 15–7–3, but failed to secure a winning record through each of the final five months of the season. The 2011–12 season marked a down-year for Yeo, as his team ranked last in number of goals scored in the NHL with a meagre 177 compared to the NHL average of 240. The team also did not make the playoffs, came third last in power play percentage, and were known for streaky play. The Wild tended to lose games in streaks, losing 32 out of 36 games in groups of two or more games. The team lost eight straight in December and seven straight in February effectively removing the Wild from playoff contention.

During the 2012–13 season, Yeo accused the San Jose Sharks players of embellishing penalties, and had to call Todd McLellan to apologize.

Early in the 2013–14 season, there were rumours that Yeo would lose his job. However, in the second half of the season, the Wild were able to make the playoffs for the second straight year. The Wild defeated the heavily favored Colorado Avalanche in seven games before losing to the Chicago Blackhawks in the second round. On May 31, 2014, Yeo was given a three-year contract extension with the Minnesota Wild.

During the 2014–15 season, there were again rumours that Yeo would lose his job. However, a mid-season trade for goalie Devan Dubnyk saved not only his job, but also the team's season. The team had a record of 18–19–5 prior to the trade and finished the season with a record of 46–28–8. The Wild qualified for the playoffs with a win at Chicago on April 7, 2015. They were then eliminated by Chicago in the playoffs for the third consecutive season, losing in four games and scoring only 7 goals the entire series.

With the hirings of Jeff Blashill by Detroit and John Hynes by New Jersey during the summer of 2015, Yeo was no longer the youngest head coach in the NHL, a title he had held for his first four seasons.

On February 13, 2016, Yeo was fired as head coach of the Minnesota Wild, after losing 13 of his last 14 games as head coach.

On June 13, 2016, he was named as the eventual successor to Ken Hitchcock as coach of the St. Louis Blues. He served as an assistant coach during the 2016–17 season and was to assume the head coach position beginning in the 2017–18 season.

On February 1, 2017, Yeo was named as the head coach of the Blues after Ken Hitchcock was fired. Yeo led a remarkable turn-around for the Blues in the second half of the season, going 22–8–2 and reaching the playoffs, where he defeated his former club Minnesota in the 1st round before bowing out to eventual Stanley Cup finalists Nashville Predators.

On November 19, 2018, the Blues fired Yeo and replaced him with Craig Berube who then coached the Blues to their first Stanley Cup Championship.

On May 6, 2019, the Philadelphia Flyers announced that Yeo would assume an assistant coaching position under Alain Vigneault. On December 6, 2021, Yeo was named the interim head coach of the Flyers following the firing of Vigneault. Yeo was then fired by Philadelphia on May 3, 2022, after the conclusion of the 2021–22 season.

On July 1, 2022, Yeo was hired as an assistant coach with the Vancouver Canucks under Bruce Boudreau. On May 28, 2024, the Canucks and Yeo released a press statement that had mutually parted ways.

Yeo was hired on June 4, 2024 as an assistant coach with the Ottawa Senators.

== Personal life ==
Yeo and his wife Tanya have a daughter, Braeden and a son, Kyler. He attended Widdifield Secondary School.

Despite having a surname that is commonly associated with Asian culture, Yeo is not of Asian descent. He has stated that his surname was shortened from Yeomen by an early ancestor.

== Career player statistics ==
			Regular season					Playoffs
Season	Team	League	GP	G	A	Pts	PIM	GP	G	A	Pts	PIM
1990–91	Sudbury Wolves	OHL	58	7	2	9	73	4	0	0	0	5
1991–92	Sudbury Wolves	OHL	43	5	8	13	60	11	2	1	3	2
1992–93	Sudbury Wolves	OHL	24	8	5	13	47	3	0	0	0	5
1993–94	Sudbury Wolves	OHL	65	34	32	66	53	10	8	4	12	4
1994–95	Houston Aeros	IHL	63	5	12	17	100	–	–	–	–	–
1995–96	Houston Aeros	IHL	69	14	16	30	113	–	–	–	–	–
1996–97	Houston Aeros	IHL	56	10	11	21	105	13	2	3	5	2
1997–98	Houston Aeros	IHL	72	20	21	41	128	3	0	1	1	2
1998–99	Houston Aeros	IHL	57	6	12	18	100	9	0	4	4	11
1999–2000	Wilkes-Barre/Scranton Penguins	AHL	19	1	3	4	4	–	–	–	–	–
OHL totals			190	54	47	101	233	28	10	5	15	16
IHL totals			317	55	72	127	511	25	2	8	10	15
AHL totals			19	1	3	4	4	–	–	–	–	–

== NHL coaching record ==
Team	Year	Regular season						Postseason			
Team	Year	G	W	L	OTL	Pts	Finish	W	L	W%	Result
MIN	2011–12	82	35	36	11	81	4th in Northwest	—	—	—	Missed playoffs
MIN	2012–13†	48	26	19	3	55	2nd in Northwest	1	4	.200	Lost in first round (CHI)
MIN	2013–14	82	43	27	12	98	4th in Central	6	7	.462	Lost in second round (CHI)
MIN	2014–15	82	46	28	8	100	4th in Central	4	6	.400	Lost in second round (CHI)
MIN	2015–16	55	23	22	10	(56)	(fired)	—	—	—	—
MIN total		349	173	132	44	390		11	17	.393	
STL	2016–17	32	22	8	2	(46)	3rd in Central	6	5	.545	Lost in second round (NSH)
STL	2017–18	82	44	32	6	94	5th in Central	—	—	—	Missed playoffs
STL	2018–19	19	7	9	3	(17)	(fired)	—	—	—	—
STL total		133	73	49	11	157		6	5	.545	
PHI	2021–22	60	17	36	7	(41)	8th in Metropolitan	—	—	—	Missed playoffs
PHI total		60	17	36	7	41		—	—	—	
Total		542	263	217	62	547		17	22	.436	

Notes:

- ^{†} Lockout-shortened season

Sporting positions
Preceded by Todd Richards	Head coach of the Minnesota Wild; 2011–2016	Succeeded by John Torchetti (interim)
Preceded by Ken Hitchcock	Head coach of the St. Louis Blues; 2017–2018	Succeeded by Craig Berube (interim)
Preceded by Alain Vigneault	Head coach of the Philadelphia Flyers (interim); 2021–2022	Succeeded by John Tortorella
