= John Torchetti =

American ice hockey player and coach

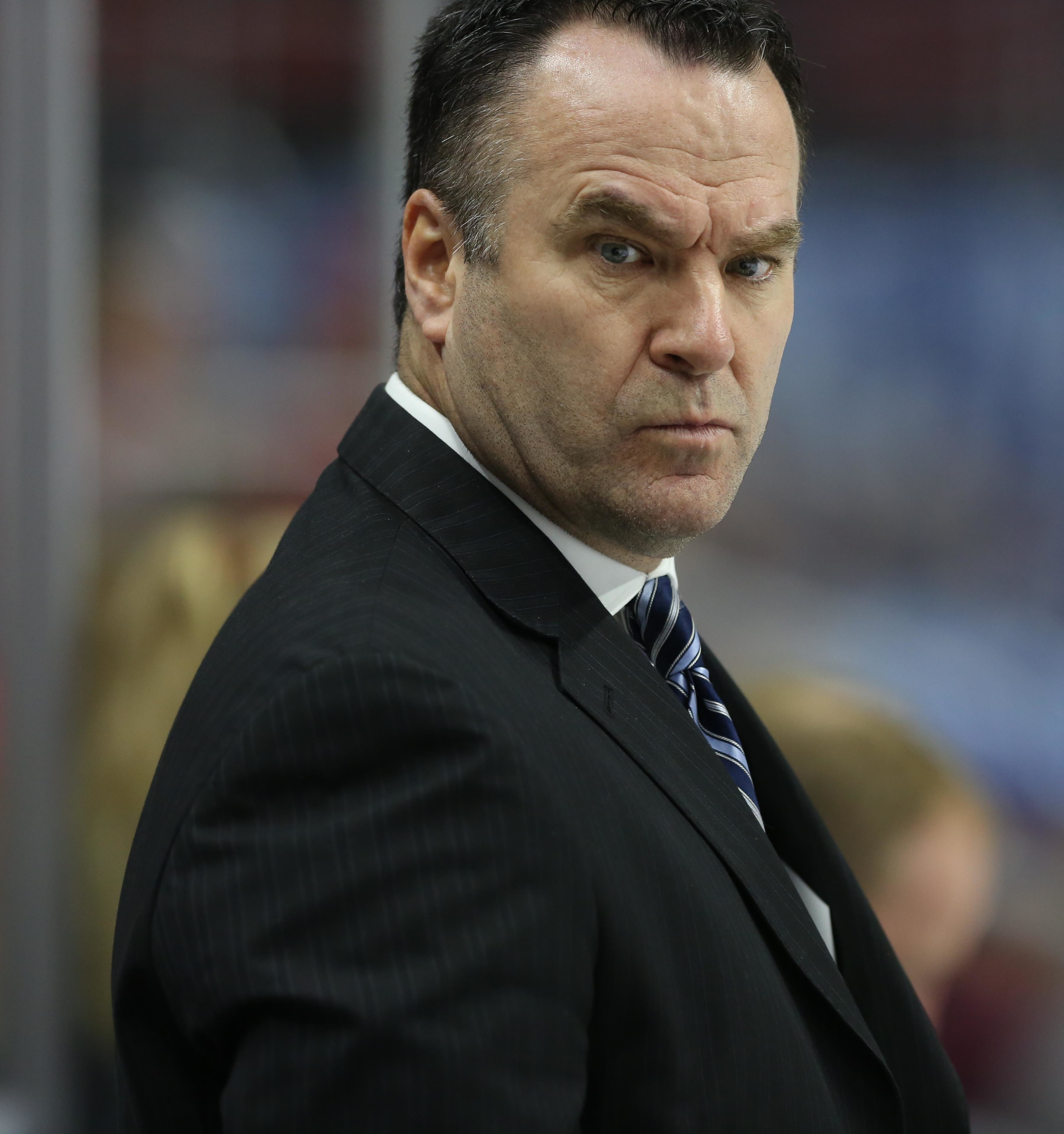
- Torchetti with the Iowa Wild in 2014
- Born: July 9, 1964 (age 62) Boston, Massachusetts, U.S.
- Height: 6 ft 0 in (183 cm)
- Weight: 200 lb (91 kg; 14 st 4 lb)
- Position: Left wing
- Shot: Right
- Played for: Binghamton Whalers; Carolina Thunderbirds; Virginia Lancers; Winston-Salem Thunderbirds
- Coached for: San Antonio Iguanas; Fort Wayne Komets; San Antonio Rampage; Houston Aeros; CSKA Moscow; Iowa Wild; Detroit Red Wings; Moncton Wildcats; Philadelphia Flyers
- NHL draft: Undrafted
- Playing career: 1984–1991
- Coaching career: 1991–present

John Torchetti (born July 9, 1964) is an American former professional ice hockey player and coach, currently serving as the head coach for the Tri-City Storm of the United States Hockey League (USHL). Torchetti has been an interim head coach in the National Hockey League (NHL) for the Florida Panthers, the Los Angeles Kings, and Minnesota Wild.

Torchetti has served as the head coach for the San Antonio Rampage of the American Hockey League (2002–2003), the Moncton Wildcats of the QMJHL (2006–2007), and the Iowa Wild of the American Hockey League (2014–2016). He served as an assistant coach with the Atlanta Thrashers, Detroit Red Wings, Chicago Blackhawks, and the Tampa Bay Lightning in the NHL, as well as the Kontinental Hockey League's HC CSKA Moscow.

== Playing career ==
Torchetti played prep school hockey for the powerful New Preparatory School of Cambridge, Massachusetts, as a post-graduate at the age of eighteen under the coaching tutelage of the regionally renowned George Kozack. Before attending New Prep School, Torchetti played for Jamaica Plain High School in the Boston City League, where he set state scoring records, superseding the ones achieved in the late 1960s by Robbie Ftorek of Needham High School.

Torchetti started his professional career as a member of the Carolina Thunderbirds, where he would spend seven of his eight seasons. Torchetti led the All-American Hockey League (AAHL) in goals (63), assists (71), and points (134) during the 1987–88 AAHL season. He would have a brief call-up with the Binghamton Whalers of the American Hockey League at the start of the 1988–89 season, but returned to Carolina, which had since helped found the East Coast Hockey League (ECHL), after ten games.

After eight seasons in the minors, Torchetti retired from hockey after the 1990–91 ECHL season.

== Coaching career ==
His first coaching assignment came as an assistant coach for the Greensboro Monarchs of the ECHL. His first head coaching position was with the San Antonio Iguanas of the Central Hockey League, where he took over when Bill Goldsworthy became ill. He coached the Iguanas to the finals twice in two years and won the Commissioner's Trophy for coach of the year in 1995. After spending the first half of the 1996–97 season as an assistant coach with the San Antonio Dragons of the International Hockey League, Torchetti became head coach of the Fort Wayne Komets. In 1998, he won the Commissioners' Trophy.

Before the 1999–2000 NHL season Torchetti was hired as an assistant coach for the Tampa Bay Lightning under Steve Ludzik. In 2002, Torchetti returned to San Antonio when he was hired as head coach of the San Antonio Rampage in the American Hockey League (AHL). After 65 games he was promoted to assistant coach with the parent club, the Florida Panthers. In 2004, he served 27 games as interim head coach, replacing Rick Dudley. He finished with a 10–12–4–1 record before being replaced by Jacques Martin. During the 2005–06 NHL season, Torchetti was hired by Dave Taylor as interim head coach of the Los Angeles Kings. With a chance to clinch a playoff spot, he had a 5–7 record in the team's final 12 games and was not retained by the Kings, instead being replaced by Marc Crawford.

In 2006, he was hired by the Moncton Wildcats to replace Ted Nolan as head coach and director of hockey operations. He coached the team to a 39–25–0–4 record and a third-placed finish in the Quebec Major Junior Hockey League's Eastern Division. The Wildcats were eliminated in the first round by the Halifax Mooseheads.

Torchetti was hired as an associate coach for the Chicago Blackhawks on May 16, 2007, and won his first Stanley Cup in 2010.

On July 8, 2010, it was announced that Torchetti has been hired by the Atlanta Thrashers as the associate head coach under Craig Ramsay.

On July 5, 2011, he was announced as the new head coach of the Houston Aeros in the AHL, replacing Mike Yeo.

On June 24, 2013, he was introduced as the new head coach of the Kontinental Hockey League's CSKA Moscow.

On November 12, 2014, he was announced as the head coach of the Iowa Wild. He replaced Kurt Kleinendorst, who had started the season with a 2–10 record. This marked a return to a franchise he led in Houston. On February 13, 2016, Torchetti he was promoted to the interim head coach of the NHL's Minnesota Wild.

On June 9, 2016, Torchetti was named an assistant coach for the Detroit Red Wings.

On January 15, 2019, Torchetti was announced to return as the head coach and director of hockey operations for the Moncton Wildcats. On December 14, 2019, the Wildcats announced that Torchetti was fired, a decision made due to "internal reasons."

Torchetti joined the Philadelphia Flyers' coaching staff as an assistant on January 25, 2022.

== Awards ==
=== All-American Hockey League ===
Award	Year(s)
First Team All-Star	1987–88
Most points	1987–88
Most goals scored	1987–88
Most assists	1987–88
Most Valuable Player	1987–88

=== Atlantic Coast Hockey League ===
Award	Year(s)
Regular season champion	1984–85, 1985–86

=== East Coast Hockey League ===
Award	Year(s)
Riley Cup winner	1988–89

== Coaching record ==
Team	Year	Regular season							Postseason
Team	Year	G	W	L	T	OTL	Pts	Finish	Result
Florida Panthers	2003–04	27	10	12	4	1	25	4th in Southeast	Missed playoffs
Los Angeles Kings	2005–06	12	5	7	—	0	10	4th in Pacific	Missed playoffs
Minnesota Wild	2015–16	27	15	11	—	1	31	5th in Central	Lost in first round
Total		66	30	30	4	2			1 playoff appearance

Preceded by Rick Dudley	Head coach of the Florida Panthers (interim); 2003–04	Succeeded by Jacques Martin
Preceded by Andy Murray	Head coach of the Los Angeles Kings (interim); 2006	Succeeded by Marc Crawford
Preceded by Mike Yeo	Head coach of the Minnesota Wild (interim); 2016	Succeeded by Bruce Boudreau
