= Todd Richards (ice hockey) =

American ice hockey coach (born 1966)

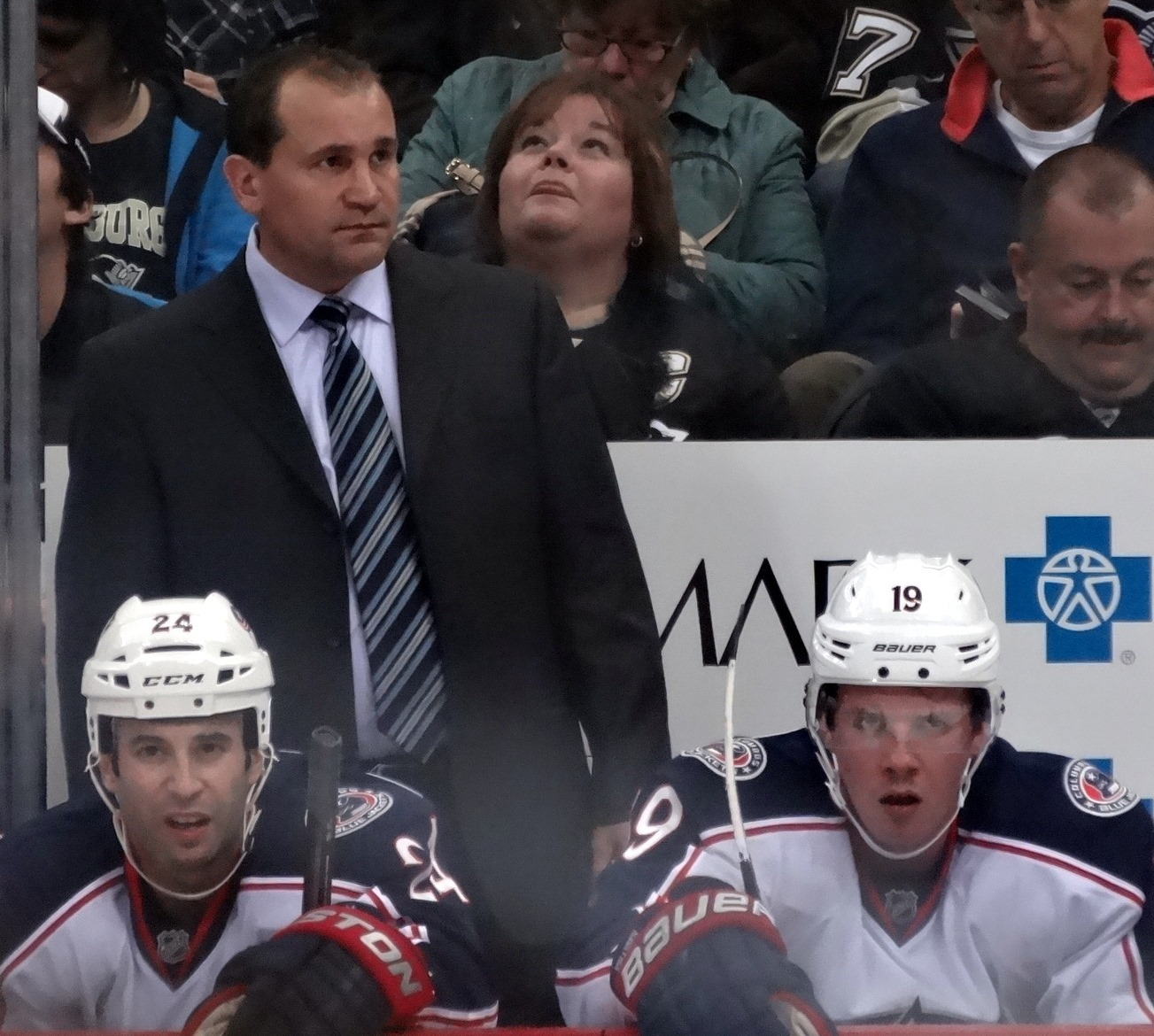
- Richards in 2013 coaching the Blue Jackets
- Born: October 20, 1966 (age 60) Crystal, Minnesota, U.S.
- Height: 6 ft 0 in (183 cm)
- Weight: 194 lb (88 kg; 13 st 12 lb)
- Position: Defence
- Shot: Right
- Played for: Hartford Whalers
- Coached for: Minnesota Wild; Columbus Blue Jackets
- NHL draft: 33rd overall, 1985; Montreal Canadiens
- Playing career: 1989–2002

Todd Michael Richards (born October 20, 1966) is an American ice hockey coach and former player. He is currently an assistant coach for the Nashville Predators of the National Hockey League (NHL).

== Playing career ==
Richards was drafted by the Montreal Canadiens in the second round (33rd overall) of the 1985 NHL entry draft. He played for the University of Minnesota for four seasons.

He began his professional career with the Sherbrooke Canadiens during the 1989–90 AHL season. After being traded early the next season to the Hartford Whalers organization, he helped the Springfield Indians win the 1991 Calder Cup. Richards also made his NHL debut during that season, playing two games and recording four assists for the Whalers. Richards spent two more seasons with the Indians before beginning to play in the IHL, spending two seasons with the Las Vegas Thunder, and six seasons with the Orlando Solar Bears. He ended his playing career in 2002 with the Genève-Servette HC of the National League A in Switzerland.

== Coaching career ==
After retiring from playing, Richards spent four seasons as an assistant coach for the Milwaukee Admirals. The Admirals advanced to the playoffs each year. In 2004, Milwaukee won the Calder Cup, after sweeping the Wilkes-Barre/Scranton Penguins in four games.

On August 3, 2006, Richards became the fifth head coach of the Wilkes-Barre/Scranton Penguins. During his first season, he guided Wilkes-Barre/Scranton to a 51-24-2-4 record and a second-place finish in the AHL’s East Division. The Penguins advanced to the East Division Final before falling to the Hershey Bears.

Richards signed as an assistant coach with the San Jose Sharks of the NHL for the 2008–09 season.

Richards became the second head coach in the history of the Minnesota Wild in June 2009, and the first native of Minnesota to hold the job. After two seasons as head coach and posting a record of 77-71-16, Richards was fired on April 11, 2011. In both seasons, the Wild were in playoff contention most of the season but ended up missing the playoffs. In June 2011, Richards had been hired by the Columbus Blue Jackets as an assistant coach under head coach Scott Arniel. After a poor first half of the season, Arniel was fired on January 9, 2012, and Richards was named as interim head coach.

On May 14, 2012, the Columbus Blue Jackets signed Richards to a two-year contract, making him the sixth full-time coach in team history. On April 19, 2014, Richards led the Blue Jackets to their first ever Stanley Cup playoff victory, a 4-3 double overtime win over the Pittsburgh Penguins. On April 23, Richards coached the Blue Jackets to their first ever Stanley Cup playoff home victory, winning 4-3 in overtime over the Pittsburgh Penguins. On May 27, the Blue Jackets signed Richards to a two-year contract extension through the 2016-17 season. On October 21, 2015, after starting the season 0–7, the Blue Jackets relieved Richards of his duties as head coach.

On June 7, 2016, the Tampa Bay Lightning hired Richards as an assistant coach. On September 28, 2020, he won the Stanley Cup with the Lightning.

On October 23, 2020, the Nashville Predators hired Richards as an assistant coach under head coach John Hynes.

== Personal life ==
Richards is the father of Justin Richards who is under contract with the Columbus Blue Jackets. Richards' brother, Travis Richards, is a former ice hockey player.

== Career statistics ==
=== Regular season and playoffs ===
			Regular season					Playoffs
Season	Team	League	GP	G	A	Pts	PIM	GP	G	A	Pts	PIM
1984–85	Robbinsdale Armstrong High School	HS-MN	24	10	23	33	24	—	—	—	—	—
1985–86	University of Minnesota	WCHA	38	6	23	29	38	—	—	—	—	—
1986–87	University of Minnesota	WCHA	49	8	43	51	70	—	—	—	—	—
1987–88	University of Minnesota	WCHA	34	10	30	40	26	—	—	—	—	—
1988–89	University of Minnesota	WCHA	46	6	32	38	60	—	—	—	—	—
1989–90	Sherbrooke Canadiens	AHL	71	6	18	24	73	5	1	2	3	6
1990–91	Fredericton Canadiens	AHL	3	0	1	1	2	—	—	—	—	—
1990–91	Springfield Indians	AHL	71	10	41	51	62	14	2	8	10	2
1990–91	Hartford Whalers	NHL	2	0	4	4	2	6	0	0	0	2
1991–92	Hartford Whalers	NHL	6	0	0	0	2	5	0	3	3	4
1991–92	Springfield Indians	AHL	43	6	23	29	33	8	0	3	3	2
1992–93	Springfield Indians	AHL	78	13	42	55	53	9	1	5	6	2
1993–94	Las Vegas Thunder	IHL	80	11	35	46	122	5	1	4	5	18
1994–95	Las Vegas Thunder	IHL	80	12	49	61	130	9	1	2	3	6
1995–96	Orlando Solar Bears	IHL	81	19	54	73	59	23	4	9	13	8
1996–97	Orlando Solar Bears	IHL	82	9	36	45	134	10	0	1	1	4
1997–98	Orlando Solar Bears	IHL	75	6	37	43	68	17	3	8	11	13
1998–99	Orlando Solar Bears	IHL	67	11	26	37	61	16	3	7	10	14
1999–00	Orlando Solar Bears	IHL	43	7	18	25	26	6	0	5	5	4
2000–01	Orlando Solar Bears	IHL	75	9	28	37	60	16	2	11	13	8
2001–02	Genève-Servette HC	NLB	34	11	26	37	18	13	3	13	16	10
IHL totals			583	84	283	367	660	102	14	47	61	75
NHL totals			8	0	4	4	4	11	0	3	3	6

== NHL coaching record ==
Team	Year	Regular season						Postseason		
Team	Year	Games	Won	Lost	OTL	Points	Finish	Won	Lost	Result
MIN	2009–10	82	38	36	8	84	4th in Northwest	—	—	Missed playoffs
MIN	2010–11	82	39	35	8	86	3rd in Northwest	—	—	Missed playoffs
CBJ	2011–12	41	18	21	2	(38)	5th in Central	—	—	Missed playoffs
CBJ	2012–13	48	24	17	7	55	4th in Central	—	—	Missed playoffs
CBJ	2013–14	82	43	32	7	93	4th in Metropolitan	2	4	Lost in First Round
CBJ	2014–15	82	42	35	5	89	5th in Metropolitan	—	—	Missed playoffs
CBJ	2015–16	7	0	7	0	0	(fired)	—	—	—
Total		417	204	176	37			2	4	

== Awards and honors ==
Award	Year
College
All-WCHA Second Team	1986–87, 1987–88, 1988–89
AHCA West Second-Team All-American	1988–89
All-NCAA All-Tournament Team	1989
NHL
Stanley Cup champion	2020

Sporting positions
Preceded by Joe Mullen	Head coach of the Wilkes-Barre/Scranton Penguins; 2006–2008	Succeeded by Dan Bylsma
Preceded by Jacques Lemaire	Head coach of the Minnesota Wild; 2009–11	Succeeded by Mike Yeo
Preceded by Scott Arniel	Head coach of the Columbus Blue Jackets; 2012–15	Succeeded by John Tortorella
