= 2011–12 NHL season =

National Hockey League season

- League: National Hockey League
- Sport: Ice hockey
- Duration: October 6, 2011 – June 11, 2012
- Games: 82
- Teams: 30
- TV partner(s): CBC, TSN, RDS (Canada); NBCSN, NBC, CNBC (United States)

Draft
- Top draft pick: Ryan Nugent-Hopkins
- Picked by: Edmonton Oilers

Regular season
- Presidents' Trophy: Vancouver Canucks
- Season MVP: Evgeni Malkin (Penguins)
- Top scorer: Evgeni Malkin (Penguins)

Playoffs
- Playoffs MVP: Jonathan Quick (Kings)

Stanley Cup
- Champions: Los Angeles Kings
- Runners-up: New Jersey Devils

NHL seasons
- 2010–11 2012–13

The 2011–12 NHL season was the 95th season of operation (94th season of play) of the National Hockey League (NHL). The Los Angeles Kings defeated the New Jersey Devils in the Stanley Cup Final four games to two to win the team's first Stanley Cup in their second Stanley Cup Final appearance; they had lost to Montreal Canadiens in the 1993 Final.

During the off-season, the Atlanta Thrashers relocated to Winnipeg, to become the "new" Winnipeg Jets, reviving the franchise that had last played in the 1995–96 season. It was the first NHL team relocation since the 1997–98 season, when the Hartford Whalers relocated to become the Carolina Hurricanes. The league did not change its divisional structure to accommodate the move, and the Jets took the place of the Thrashers in the Southeast Division. In December 2011, the board of governors eventually approved a proposed realignment for the following season, which would result in four conferences with the first two rounds of the playoffs being divisional, but this was rejected by the NHL Players' Association (NHLPA).

It was the fifth consecutive season with games in Europe at the start of the season. The Winter Classic was held on January 2, 2012, in Philadelphia between the Philadelphia Flyers and the New York Rangers. The 59th All-Star Game was held at Scotiabank Place in Ottawa, Ontario, the home arena of the Ottawa Senators, on January 29, 2012.

== League business ==
=== Franchise relocation ===
Atlanta Spirit, LLC, which previously owned the Atlanta Thrashers, sold the team to True North Sports and Entertainment, who relocated them to the True North-owned MTS Centre in Winnipeg, Manitoba and renamed the Winnipeg Jets, reviving the franchise that had originally played from 1972 to 1996. Winnipeg took Atlanta's place in the Southeast Division for 2011–12.

=== Salary cap ===
On June 23, 2011, the NHL announced that the salary cap would be increased by US$4.9 million. As a result, the new salary cap ceiling was set at US$64.3 million while the salary cap floor was US$48.3 million.

=== Entry draft ===
The 2011 NHL entry draft was held on June 24–25, 2011, at the Xcel Energy Center in Saint Paul, Minnesota. Ryan Nugent-Hopkins was selected first overall by the Edmonton Oilers.

=== Uniform changes ===
Several teams announced plans to change their uniforms in the 2011–12 season.

The Edmonton Oilers unveiled a new away uniform parallel to their "retro" home uniform used from 1979 to 1996. They retained the navy blue, copper and red uniforms as their alternates.

The Nashville Predators unveiled new home and away uniforms on June 22, complete with the updated saber-toothed cat logo. Their use of gold as the home colors marked the first time since 1988 that an NHL team wore gold in their home uniforms.

The Florida Panthers made minor changes to their home uniform, using red as the primary and relegating navy blue as a trim color.

The Los Angeles Kings returned to the silver and black motif they used from 1988 to 1998, by designating their alternate home black and silver uniform as a regular uniform and unveiling a new white away uniform with black and silver trim. The purple and black uniform were retained as an alternate uniform.

The Ottawa Senators unveiled a new alternate home uniform based on the original Senators barber pole design. The uniform does not use the Roman centurion logo, instead using an outlined "O" on stripes. The Senators' uniform also had an All-Star Game patch.

The Pittsburgh Penguins promoted their dark blue uniforms, worn during the 2011 NHL Winter Classic, as the home alternates, replacing the 2008 NHL Winter Classic alternates.

The Tampa Bay Lightning unveiled new home and road uniforms, featuring the simplified lightning logo. Originally the uniforms were simply blue and white, but by popular demand, black was added as a trim color to the uniform numbers, and added the lightning bolt to the pants. The "Bolts" alternate home uniform was retained.

The Toronto Maple Leafs unveiled a new alternate home uniform based on the Leafs uniforms worn during their run to the 1967 Stanley Cup title, including the 11-point maple leaf logo.

The Washington Capitals also promoted their 2011 NHL Winter Classic retro uniforms as their road alternates.

The new Winnipeg Jets unveiled uniforms consisting of navy with silver and light blue trim, containing a logo based on the roundel of the Royal Canadian Air Force; these were significantly different from, but in a similar color scheme to, the original Jets uniforms.

The New York Islanders unveiled a new black alternate uniform, featuring the team name above the player's number, a similar template the Dallas Stars' uniforms currently use. Speaking of the Stars, they officially retired their alternate away jersey featuring the team crest, instead using their regular away jerseys with the city name and number in front for all 41 road games.

The New York Rangers and Philadelphia Flyers wore special commemorative uniforms for the 2012 NHL Winter Classic. The Flyers unveiled theirs on November 21, and is in a classic sweater design in orange featuring black numbers and different striping patterns on the yoke. The Rangers unveiled theirs on November 28, and features a mix of designs used from previous jerseys. The shield logo in front is a variation of the logos used during the 1930s–1940s, while the shoulder, arm and tail striping was taken from the current jersey. Both teams would wear their Winter Classic uniforms again on February 5 and 11 at Madison Square Garden and Wells Fargo Center respectively, with the away team wearing the regular uniforms.

In addition several teams sported memorial patches throughout the season; many of these memorials were for related events (see "Off-Season" section below). Unless specified, the patches were seen on the team helmets:

- Anaheim Ducks – Ruslan Salei (24) memorial on uniforms
- Calgary Flames – Harley Hotchkiss (HH) memorial
- Carolina Hurricanes – Josef Vasicek (63) memorial; worn on uniforms
- Dallas Stars – Karlis Skrastins (37) memorial
- Detroit Red Wings – Brad McCrimmon, Ruslan Salei and Stefan Liv (BM·RS·SL) memorial; worn on uniforms
- Minnesota Wild – Pavol Demitra (38) and Derek Boogaard (24) memorials
- Nashville Predators – Wade Belak (3) memorial
- New York Islanders – 40th anniversary of the franchise; worn on uniforms
- New York Rangers – Derek Boogaard (94) memorial
- Vancouver Canucks – Rick Rypien (37) memorial
- Winnipeg Jets – Rick Rypien (RR) memorial
- St. Louis Blues – Pavol Demitra and Igor Korolev (38) memorial

Furthermore, a new league-wide rule required that player numbers be displayed on the front of their helmets, as well as on the back.

Even though the New Jersey Devils and the Arizona Coyotes unveiled anniversary logos commemorating their 30th and 15th anniversaries of their respective relocations from Colorado and Winnipeg, they opted not to use them on their uniforms or helmets.

=== Arena changes ===
- The Carolina Hurricanes' home arena, RBC Center, was renamed PNC Arena on March 15, 2012, in recognition of PNC Financial Services purchasing the US assets of RBC Bank.
- The Buffalo Sabres home arena, HSBC Arena, was renamed First Niagara Center in recognition of First Niagara Bank's purchase of HSBC's upstate New York branches.
- The Tampa Bay Lightning's home arena, the St. Pete Times Forum, was renamed the Tampa Bay Times Forum on January 1, 2012, in recognition of the St. Petersburg Times newspaper being renamed to the Tampa Bay Times.
- The relocated Winnipeg Jets moved from Philips Arena in Atlanta to MTS Centre in Winnipeg, where Manitoba Telecom Services (MTS) had held the naming rights since the venue opened in 2004.

=== Rule changes ===
Boarding

Prior to the 2011–12 season, the Board of Governors unanimously agreed to update and re-word rule 41 involving boarding penalties. The new wording requires the player delivering the check to avoid or minimize contact if the opponent is defenceless.

Illegal hits to the head

The Board of Governors also approved an update to rule 48 involving illegal checks to the head. The new rule will penalize all hits where the head is the principal point of contact. The previous version of this rule only made checks from the blindside illegal. However, determination if the check is legal will depend on various factors including whether or not the player put himself in a vulnerable position or if the hit was unavoidable. A two-minute minor penalty, or a major penalty in the event the hit was deemed to be deliberate with intent to injure, may be assessed.

== Off-season ==
Three young (under 40) "enforcer"-type players died within a four-month span during the off-season. The deaths of Derek Boogaard, Rick Rypien and Wade Belak led to speculation about the effect of fighting on the mental health of players.

Several former NHL players died in the 2011 Lokomotiv Yaroslavl plane crash involving the Kontinental Hockey League (KHL) Lokomotiv Yaroslavl hockey team in Russia. Those who perished in the plane crash included NHL All-Star Pavol Demitra, Alexander Karpovtsev, Igor Korolev, Brad McCrimmon, Karel Rachunek, Ruslan Salei, Karlis Skrastins and Josef Vasicek along with nearly the entire team roster, coaches, and several young prospects.

== Pre-season ==
=== European exhibition games ===
The four teams going to Europe to open their regular seasons there as part of the NHL Premiere games also played exhibition games against European teams under the banner of NHL Premiere Challenge to close out their pre-seasons. The NHL teams had an overall record of 6–1–0 against the European teams, with the New York Rangers, playing four games in five days in four countries, having a record of 3–1–0.

Date	City	NHL team	European team	Score
September 29	Prague, Czech Republic	New York Rangers	HC Sparta Praha	2–0
September 30	Gothenburg, Sweden	New York Rangers	Frölunda HC	4–2
October 2	Bratislava, Slovakia	New York Rangers	HC Slovan Bratislava	4–1
October 3	Zug, Switzerland	New York Rangers	EV Zug	4–8
October 4	Helsinki, Finland	Anaheim Ducks	Jokerit	4–3 OT
October 4	Hamburg, Germany	Los Angeles Kings	Hamburg Freezers	5–4
October 4	Mannheim, Germany	Buffalo Sabres	Adler Mannheim	8–3

== Regular season ==
=== Premiere games ===
Four teams participated in the 2011 Compuware NHL Premiere in Europe. The Anaheim Ducks, Los Angeles Kings and New York Rangers made their second trip to Europe while the Buffalo Sabres made its first trip. On October 7, Anaheim played Buffalo at Hartwall Areena in Helsinki, Finland, and Los Angeles faced New York at the Ericsson Globe Arena in Stockholm, Sweden. All four teams played again on October 8 with Los Angeles against Buffalo at the O2 World Arena in Berlin, Germany, and Anaheim against New York in Stockholm.

=== Thanksgiving Showdown ===
As part of the league's updated television contract, the NHL debuted the Thanksgiving Showdown, a nationally broadcast game on the day after American Thanksgiving in 2011. The game, which was sponsored by Discover, featured the Boston Bruins (who have traditionally hosted Black Friday matinées since 1990) hosting the Detroit Red Wings, with Detroit winning the game in a shootout, 3–2.

=== 2012 Winter Classic ===
The 2012 NHL Winter Classic was held at the Citizens Bank Park baseball stadium in Philadelphia, Pennsylvania, on Monday, January 2, 2012. This season, the Philadelphia Flyers hosted the New York Rangers. It was the first Winter Classic game for the Rangers and the second for the Flyers. The result of the game was a 3–2 Ranger victory. Philadelphia last played in the 2010 NHL Winter Classic against the Boston Bruins at Fenway Park in Boston, Massachusetts. The Bruins won that game in overtime by a score of 2–1 on a goal scored by Marco Sturm.

This was the first time that the Winter Classic was not played on New Year's Day, which fell on a Sunday in 2012. If the Winter Classic was held on New Year's Day, it would have conflicted with the final game of the National Football League season (in which the Philadelphia Eagles hosted the Washington Redskins at nearby Lincoln Financial Field), and the annual Mummers Parade in downtown Philadelphia. The Flyers–Rangers rivalry is one of the NHL's most frequently televised rivalries on U.S. television networks; it was televised three times nationally on NBC in 2011–12, including the inaugural Hockey Day in America.

No Heritage Classic was played this season.

=== All-Star Game ===
The 2012 All-Star Game took place on January 29, 2012, at Scotiabank Place in Ottawa, Ontario, the home arena of the Ottawa Senators.

== Standings ==
Each of the 30 teams play an 82-game season of an unbalanced schedule. Teams play six games against division opponents; four games against other conference opponents; and one or two games against teams of the other conference. The first-place teams in each division place first, second and third in the conference standings. The top five finishers from the rest of the teams in each conference also qualified for the playoffs, making a total of eight playoff teams in each conference.

Eastern Conference
Pos	Div	Team	GP	W	L	OTL	ROW	GF	GA	GD	Pts
1	AT	z – New York Rangers	82	51	24	7	47	226	187	+39	109
2	NE	y – Boston Bruins	82	49	29	4	40	269	202	+67	102
3	SE	y – Florida Panthers	82	38	26	18	32	203	227	−24	94
4	AT	x – Pittsburgh Penguins	82	51	25	6	42	282	221	+61	108
5	AT	x – Philadelphia Flyers	82	47	26	9	43	264	232	+32	103
6	AT	x – New Jersey Devils	82	48	28	6	36	228	209	+19	102
7	SE	x – Washington Capitals	82	42	32	8	38	222	230	−8	92
8	NE	x – Ottawa Senators	82	41	31	10	35	249	240	+9	92
9	NE	Buffalo Sabres	82	39	32	11	32	218	230	−12	89
10	SE	Tampa Bay Lightning	82	38	36	8	35	235	281	−46	84
11	SE	Winnipeg Jets	82	37	35	10	33	225	246	−21	84
12	SE	Carolina Hurricanes	82	33	33	16	32	213	243	−30	82
13	NE	Toronto Maple Leafs	82	35	37	10	31	231	264	−33	80
14	AT	New York Islanders	82	34	37	11	27	203	255	−52	79
15	NE	Montreal Canadiens	82	31	35	16	26	212	226	−14	78

Source: National Hockey League
x – Clinched playoff spot; y – Clinched division; z – Clinched conference

Western Conference
Pos	Div	Team	GP	W	L	OTL	ROW	GF	GA	GD	Pts
1	NW	p – Vancouver Canucks	82	51	22	9	43	249	198	+51	111
2	CE	y – St. Louis Blues	82	49	22	11	45	210	165	+45	109
3	PA	y – Phoenix Coyotes	82	42	27	13	36	216	204	+12	97
4	CE	x – Nashville Predators	82	48	26	8	43	237	210	+27	104
5	CE	x – Detroit Red Wings	82	48	28	6	39	248	203	+45	102
6	CE	x – Chicago Blackhawks	82	45	26	11	38	248	238	+10	101
7	PA	x – San Jose Sharks	82	43	29	10	34	228	210	+18	96
8	PA	x – Los Angeles Kings	82	40	27	15	34	194	179	+15	95
9	NW	Calgary Flames	82	37	29	16	34	202	226	−24	90
10	PA	Dallas Stars	82	42	35	5	35	211	222	−11	89
11	NW	Colorado Avalanche	82	41	35	6	32	208	220	−12	88
12	NW	Minnesota Wild	82	35	36	11	24	177	226	−49	81
13	PA	Anaheim Ducks	82	34	36	12	31	204	231	−27	80
14	NW	Edmonton Oilers	82	32	40	10	27	212	239	−27	74
15	CE	Columbus Blue Jackets	82	29	46	7	25	202	262	−60	65

Source: National Hockey League
p – Clinched Presidents' Trophy; x – Clinched playoff spot; y – Clinched division

== Playoffs ==
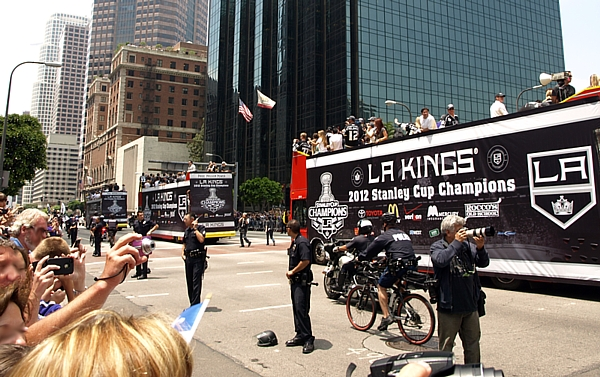
The Kings' 2012 Stanley Cup victory parade in downtown Los Angeles.

=== Bracket ===
In each round, teams competed in a best-of-seven series following a 2–2–1–1–1 format (scores in the bracket indicate the number of games won in each best-of-seven series). The team with home ice advantage played at home for games one and two (and games five and seven, if necessary), and the other team played at home for games three and four (and game six, if necessary). The top eight teams in each conference made the playoffs, with the three division winners seeded 1–3 based on regular season record, and the five remaining teams seeded 4–8.

The NHL used "re-seeding" instead of a fixed bracket playoff system. During the first three rounds, the highest remaining seed in each conference was matched against the lowest remaining seed, the second-highest remaining seed played the second-lowest remaining seed, and so forth. The higher-seeded team was awarded home ice advantage. The two conference winners then advanced to the Stanley Cup Final, where home ice advantage was awarded to the team that had the better regular season record.

Conference quarterfinals	Conference semifinals
1	NY Rangers	4
8	Ottawa	3
1	NY Rangers	4
7	Washington	3
2	Boston	3
7	Washington	4
Eastern Conference
3	Florida	3
6	New Jersey	4
5	Philadelphia	1
6	New Jersey	4
4	Pittsburgh	2
5	Philadelphia	4
1	Vancouver	1
8	Los Angeles	4
2	St. Louis	0
8	Los Angeles	4
2	St. Louis	4
7	San Jose	1
Western Conference
3	Phoenix	4
6	Chicago	2
3	Phoenix	4
4	Nashville	1
4	Nashville	4
5	Detroit	1

Conference finals
1	NY Rangers	2
6	New Jersey	4
8	Los Angeles	4
3	Phoenix	1

Stanley Cup Final
E6	New Jersey	2
W8	Los Angeles	4

== NHL awards ==
Awards were presented at the NHL Awards ceremony, held in Las Vegas, Nevada, on June 20, 2012. Finalists for voted awards are announced during the playoffs and winners are presented at the award ceremony. Voting concluded immediately after the end of the regular season. The Presidents' Trophy, the Prince of Wales Trophy and Clarence S. Campbell Bowl are not presented at the awards ceremony.

2011–12 NHL awards
Award	Recipient(s)	Runner(s)up/Finalists
Presidents' Trophy (Best regular-season record)	Vancouver Canucks	New York Rangers
Prince of Wales Trophy (Eastern Conference playoff champion)	New Jersey Devils	New York Rangers
Clarence S. Campbell Bowl (Western Conference playoff champion)	Los Angeles Kings	Phoenix Coyotes
Art Ross Trophy (Top scorer)	Evgeni Malkin (Pittsburgh Penguins)	Steven Stamkos (Tampa Bay Lightning)
Bill Masterton Memorial Trophy (Perseverance, Sportsmanship, and Dedication)	Max Pacioretty (Montreal Canadiens)	Daniel Alfredsson (Ottawa Senators); Joffrey Lupul (Toronto Maple Leafs)
Calder Memorial Trophy (Best first-year player)	Gabriel Landeskog (Colorado Avalanche)	Adam Henrique (New Jersey Devils); Ryan Nugent-Hopkins (Edmonton Oilers)
Conn Smythe Trophy (Most valuable player, playoffs)	Jonathan Quick (Los Angeles Kings)	Dustin Brown (Los Angeles Kings)
Frank J. Selke Trophy (Defensive forward)	Patrice Bergeron (Boston Bruins)	David Backes (St. Louis Blues); Pavel Datsyuk (Detroit Red Wings)
Hart Memorial Trophy (Most valuable player, regular season)	Evgeni Malkin (Pittsburgh Penguins)	Henrik Lundqvist (New York Rangers); Steven Stamkos (Tampa Bay Lightning)
Jack Adams Award (Best coach)	Ken Hitchcock (St. Louis Blues)	Paul MacLean (Ottawa Senators); John Tortorella (New York Rangers)
James Norris Memorial Trophy (Best defenceman)	Erik Karlsson (Ottawa Senators)	Zdeno Chara (Boston Bruins); Shea Weber (Nashville Predators)
King Clancy Memorial Trophy (Leadership and humanitarian contribution)	Daniel Alfredsson (Ottawa Senators)	Patrice Bergeron (Boston Bruins); Henrik Zetterberg (Detroit Red Wings)
Lady Byng Memorial Trophy (Sportsmanship and excellence)	Brian Campbell (Florida Panthers)	Jordan Eberle (Edmonton Oilers); Matt Moulson (New York Islanders)
Ted Lindsay Award (Outstanding player)	Evgeni Malkin (Pittsburgh Penguins)	Henrik Lundqvist (New York Rangers); Steven Stamkos (Tampa Bay Lightning)
Mark Messier Leadership Award (Leadership and community activities)	Shane Doan (Phoenix Coyotes)	Ryan Callahan (New York Rangers); Shea Weber (Nashville Predators
Maurice "Rocket" Richard Trophy (Top goal-scorer)	Steven Stamkos (Tampa Bay Lightning)	Evgeni Malkin (Pittsburgh Penguins)
NHL Foundation Player Award (Award for community enrichment)	Mike Fisher (Nashville Predators)	John-Michael Liles (Toronto Maple Leafs); Matt Moulson (New York Islanders)
NHL General Manager of the Year Award (Top general manager)	Doug Armstrong (St. Louis Blues)	David Poile (Nashville Predators); Dale Tallon (Florida Panthers)
Vezina Trophy (Best goaltender)	Henrik Lundqvist (New York Rangers)	Jonathan Quick (Los Angeles Kings); Pekka Rinne (Nashville Predators)
William M. Jennings Trophy (Goaltender(s) of team with fewest goals against)	Brian Elliott and Jaroslav Halak (St. Louis Blues)	Jonathan Quick (Los Angeles Kings)

=== All-Star teams ===
Position	First Team	Second Team	Position	All-Rookie
G	Henrik Lundqvist, New York Rangers	Jonathan Quick, Los Angeles Kings	G	Jhonas Enroth, Buffalo Sabres
D	Erik Karlsson, Ottawa Senators	Zdeno Chara, Boston Bruins	D	Justin Faulk, Carolina Hurricanes
D	Shea Weber, Nashville Predators	Alex Pietrangelo, St. Louis Blues	D	Jake Gardiner, Toronto Maple Leafs
C	Evgeni Malkin, Pittsburgh Penguins	Steven Stamkos, Tampa Bay Lightning	F	Adam Henrique, New Jersey Devils
RW	James Neal, Pittsburgh Penguins	Marian Gaborik, New York Rangers	F	Gabriel Landeskog, Colorado Avalanche
LW	Ilya Kovalchuk, New Jersey Devils	Ray Whitney, Phoenix Coyotes	F	Ryan Nugent-Hopkins, Edmonton Oilers

Source: NHL.

== Player statistics ==
=== Scoring leaders ===
The following players lead the league in points at the conclusion of the regular season.

GP = Games played; G = Goals; A = Assists; Pts = Points; +/– = P Plus–minus; PIM = Penalty minutes

Player	Team	GP	G	A	Pts	+/–	PIM
Evgeni Malkin	Pittsburgh Penguins	75	50	59	109	+18	70
Steven Stamkos	Tampa Bay Lightning	82	60	37	97	+7	66
Claude Giroux	Philadelphia Flyers	77	28	65	93	+6	29
Jason Spezza	Ottawa Senators	80	34	50	84	+11	36
Ilya Kovalchuk	New Jersey Devils	77	37	46	83	−9	33
Phil Kessel	Toronto Maple Leafs	82	37	45	82	−10	20
James Neal	Pittsburgh Penguins	80	40	41	81	+6	87
John Tavares	New York Islanders	82	31	50	81	−6	26
Henrik Sedin	Vancouver Canucks	82	14	67	81	+23	52
Patrik Elias	New Jersey Devils	81	26	52	78	−8	16

=== Leading goaltenders ===
The following goaltenders led the league in goals against average at the end of the regular season while playing at least 1,800 minutes.

GP = Games played; Min = Minutes played; W = Wins; L = Losses; OT = Overtime/shootout losses; GA = Goals against; SO = Shutouts; SV% = Save percentage; GAA = Goals against average

Player	Team	GP	Min	W	L	OT	GA	SO	SV%	GAA
Brian Elliott	St. Louis Blues	38	2234:35	23	10	4	58	9	.940	1.56
Jonathan Quick	Los Angeles Kings	69	4099:26	35	21	13	133	10	.929	1.95
Cory Schneider	Vancouver Canucks	33	1832:50	20	8	1	60	3	.937	1.96
Henrik Lundqvist	New York Rangers	62	3753:30	39	18	5	123	8	.930	1.97
Jaroslav Halak	St. Louis Blues	46	2746:37	26	12	7	90	6	.926	1.97
Jimmy Howard	Detroit Red Wings	57	3360:17	35	17	4	119	6	.920	2.13
Mike Smith	Phoenix Coyotes	67	3903:12	38	18	10	144	8	.930	2.21
Jean-Sebastien Giguere	Colorado Avalanche	32	1819:34	15	11	3	69	2	.919	2.27
Kari Lehtonen	Dallas Stars	59	3496:49	32	22	4	136	4	.922	2.33
Miikka Kiprusoff	Calgary Flames	70	4128:00	35	22	11	162	4	.921	2.35

== Coaching changes ==
=== Offseason ===
- Dallas Stars: Glen Gulutzan replaced the fired Marc Crawford.
- Florida Panthers: Kevin Dineen replaced the fired Peter DeBoer.
- Minnesota Wild: Mike Yeo replaced the fired Todd Richards.
- New Jersey Devils: Peter DeBoer was named as head coach for the 2011–12 season. John MacLean had been fired as head coach midway through the 2010–11 season, and Jacques Lemaire, who had retired, served as interim head coach.
- New York Islanders: This was Jack Capuano's first full season after replacing Scott Gordon on November 15, 2010.
- Ottawa Senators: Paul MacLean replaced the fired Cory Clouston.
- Winnipeg Jets: Claude Noel replaced Craig Ramsay following the former-Atlanta Thrashers' relocation to Winnipeg.

=== In-season ===
- Anaheim Ducks: Randy Carlyle was fired on November 30, 2011, and replaced by Bruce Boudreau the same day
- Los Angeles Kings: On December 12, 2011, Terry Murray was fired and John Stevens served as interim, until Darryl Sutter was named team's head coach on December 20, 2011.
- Montreal Canadiens: Jacques Martin was fired on December 17, 2011, and assistant coach Randy Cunneyworth served as interim head coach for the remainder of the season.
- St. Louis Blues: Ken Hitchcock replaced Davis Payne on November 6, 2011.
- Toronto Maple Leafs: Randy Carlyle replaced Ron Wilson on March 2, 2012.
- Washington Capitals: Bruce Boudreau was fired on November 28, 2011, and replaced by interim Dale Hunter.

== Milestones ==
=== First games ===
The following is a list of notable players who played their first NHL game in 2011–12, listed with their first team:

Player	Team	Notability
Sean Couturier	Philadelphia Flyers	Frank J. Selke Trophy winner
Marcus Foligno	Buffalo Sabres	King Clancy Memorial Trophy winner
Roman Josi	Nashville Predators	James Norris Memorial Trophy winner, two-time NHL All-Star team selection
Chris Kreider	New York Rangers	Most points in the playoffs by a player who had never played an NHL regular season game, two-time NHL All-Star
Gabriel Landeskog	Colorado Avalanche	2011–12 Calder Memorial Trophy winner, Bill Masterton Memorial Trophy winner, Mark Messier Leadership Award winner, one-time NHL All-Star, NHL All-Rookie Team selection
Ryan Nugent-Hopkins	Edmonton Oilers	First overall pick in the 2011 draft

=== Last games ===
The following is a list of players of note who played their last NHL game in 2011–12, listed with their team:

Player	Team	Notability
Jason Arnott	St. Louis Blues	Over 1,200 games played, 1994 NHL All-Rookie Team, two-time NHL All-Star
Jason Blake	Anaheim Ducks	Bill Masterton Trophy winner
Andrew Brunette	Chicago Blackhawks	Former Minnesota Wild captain, over 1,000 games played
Tomas Holmstrom	Detroit Red Wings	Over 1000 games played,
Daymond Langkow	Phoenix Coyotes	Over 1,000 games played
Nicklas Lidstrom	Detroit Red Wings	Seven-time Norris Trophy winner, most games played with only one team
Ethan Moreau	Los Angeles Kings	Former Edmonton Oilers captain, 2009 King Clancy Memorial Trophy winner
John Madden	Florida Panthers	Selke Trophy winner
Sean O'Donnell	Chicago Blackhawks	Over 1,200 games played
Chris Pronger	Philadelphia Flyers	First defenceman to win Hart Trophy since 1972, Triple Gold Club member, over 1,100 games played
Andrew Raycroft	Dallas Stars	Calder Memorial Trophy winner
Dwayne Roloson	Tampa Bay Lightning	Roger Crozier Saving Grace Award winner, oldest active NHL player at time of retirement, last active NHL player to have been born in the 1960s
Brian Rolston	Boston Bruins	Over 1,200 games played
Steve Staios	New York Islanders	Over 1,000 games played
Petr Sykora	New Jersey Devils	Over 1,000 games played
Marty Turco	Boston Bruins	Two-time Roger Crozier Saving Grace Award winner, NHL Foundation Player Award winner, two-time NHL All-Star

=== Major milestones reached ===
- On October 6, 2011, Philadelphia Flyers forward Jaromir Jagr recorded his 1,600th NHL point. He became the ninth player in league history to reach this milestone.
- On October 20, 2011, Montreal Canadiens defenceman Hal Gill participated in his 1,000th NHL game.
- On October 21, 2011, San Jose Sharks forward Joe Thornton participated in his 1,000th NHL game.
- On October 22, 2011, Detroit Red Wings defenceman Nicklas Lidstrom participated in his 1,500th NHL game. He became the first European born (and 14th overall) player to play 1,500 NHL games.
- On November 12, 2011, Nashville Predators coach Barry Trotz and Los Angeles Kings coach Terry Murray both coached their 1,000th NHL games in separate contests. They became the 20th and 21st coaches in league history to reach this milestone.
- On November 16, 2011, New Jersey Devils forward Dainius Zubrus participated in his 1,000th NHL game.
- On November 25, 2011, Columbus Blue Jackets forward Vaclav Prospal participated in his 1,000th NHL game.
- On December 18, 2011, Chicago Blackhawks coach Joel Quenneville won his 600th game as an NHL coach. He became the tenth coach in league history to reach this milestone. He became the second fastest coach in league history to reach the milestone in 1,113 games (Scotty Bowman, currently a Blackhawks senior advisor, did it in 1,002 games).
- On December 20, 2011, Washington Capitals forward Mike Knuble participated in his 1,000th NHL game.
- On December 26, 2011, Carolina Hurricanes goaltender Cam Ward was credited with scoring a goal. He is the tenth goaltender to achieve this in league history.
- On January 1, 2012, Calgary Flames forward Olli Jokinen participated in his 1,000th NHL game.
- On January 6, 2012, New Jersey Devils forward Patrik Elias participated in his 1,000th NHL game.
- On January 7, 2012, Calgary Flames forward Jarome Iginla recorded his 500th career goal. He became the 42nd player in league history to reach this milestone.
- On January 10, 2012, Minnesota Wild forward Matt Cullen participated in his 1,000th NHL game.
- On January 14, 2012, New York Islanders goaltender Evgeni Nabokov recorded his 300th career win. He became the 26th goaltender in league history to reach this milestone.
- On February 2, 2012, Edmonton Oilers forward Sam Gagner registered eight points (four goals and four assists) in one game. He became the 13th player in league history to achieve this.
- On February 8, 2012, Calgary Flames goaltender Miikka Kiprusoff recorded his 300th career win. He became the 27th goaltender in league history to reach this milestone.
- On February 9, 2012, Ottawa Senators defenceman Chris Phillips participated in his 1,000th NHL game.
- On February 10, 2012, Detroit Red Wings forward Tomas Holmstrom participated in his 1,000th NHL game.
- On February 14, 2012, the Detroit Red Wings set a new NHL record for consecutive home wins at 21 straight with a 3–1 win over the Dallas Stars. The previous record of 20 consecutive wins was originally set by the Boston Bruins in 1929–30 and tied by the Philadelphia Flyers in 1975–76. The new record is 23 consecutive home wins.
- On February 27, 2012, New York Rangers goaltender Henrik Lundqvist recorded his 30th win of the season, making him the only goaltender in NHL history to record seven consecutive 30-win seasons to begin his career.
- On March 4, 2012, New Jersey Devils forward Petr Sykora participated in his 1,000th NHL game.
- On March 11, 2012, Pittsburgh Penguins center Evgeni Malkin scored his 500th career point.
- On March 12, 2012, Anaheim Ducks forward Saku Koivu participated in his 1,000th NHL game.
- On March 24, 2012, Boston Bruins defenceman Zdeno Chara participated in his 1,000th NHL game.
- On March 25, 2012, Phoenix Coyotes defenceman Derek Morris participated in his 1,000th NHL game.
- On March 30, 2012, Nashville Predators coach Barry Trotz won his 500th game as an NHL coach. He became the 17th coach in league history to reach this milestone.
- On March 31, 2012, Phoenix Coyotes forward Ray Whitney recorded his 1,000th NHL point. He became the 79th player in league history to reach this milestone.
- On April 5, 2012, New York Islanders defenceman Steve Staios participated in his 1,000th NHL game.
- On June 11, 2012, the Los Angeles Kings won their first Stanley Cup in franchise history, becoming the first eighth seed to win the Cup.

== Broadcasting rights ==
This was the fourth season of the league's Canadian national broadcast rights deals with CBC and TSN. During the regular season, CBC continued to air Saturday night Hockey Night in Canada games while TSN aired games on Wednesdays and other selected weeknights. CBC and TSN then split the first three rounds of the playoffs, selecting the rights to individual series using a draft-like setup. The Stanley Cup Final aired exclusively on CBC.

This was the first season under the NHL's ten-year U.S. rights deal with NBC Sports, and the first full season after the January 2011 acquisition of NBC Universal by Comcast (owner of the NHL's cable partner Versus). Notable changes under this new deal included an increase in nationally televised games on Versus (which was renamed NBCSN in January 2012), a new Thanksgiving Friday game on the NBC broadcast network, holding exclusive rights to all playoff games beginning with the second round (as opposed to the conference finals), and plans to broadcast all playoff games (subject to blackouts during the first round) nationally on NBC Universal channels.

== See also ==
- 2011 in sports
- 2012 in sports
