= Jack Adams Award =

Ice hockey award

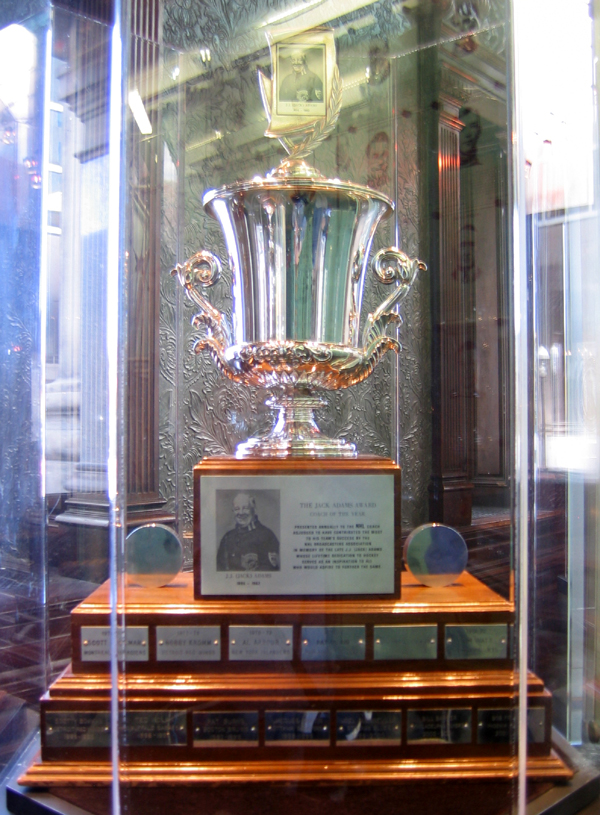
- Sport: Ice hockey
- Awarded for: National Hockey League coach "adjudged to have contributed the most to his team's success."

History
- First award: 1973–74 NHL season
- First winner: Fred Shero
- Most wins: Pat Burns (3)
- Most recent: Jon Cooper; Tampa Bay Lightning

The Jack Adams Award is awarded annually to the National Hockey League (NHL) coach "adjudged to have contributed the most to his team's success." The league's Coach of the Year award has been presented 51 times to 43 coaches. The winner is selected by a poll of the National Hockey League Broadcasters Association at the end of the regular season. Five coaches have won the award twice, while Pat Burns has won three times, the most of any coach. The award is named in honor of Jack Adams, Hall of Fame player for the Toronto Arenas/St. Patricks, Vancouver Millionaires and original Ottawa Senators, and long-time Coach and General Manager of the Detroit Red Wings. It was first awarded at the conclusion of the 1973–74 regular season.

Jacques Demers is the only coach to win the award in consecutive seasons. Five coaches have won the award with two teams: Jacques Lemaire, Pat Quinn, Scotty Bowman, Barry Trotz, and John Tortorella have won the award twice. Pat Burns is the only coach to win the Adams Award three times, as well as the only coach to win it with three different teams. The franchises with the most Jack Adams Award winners are the Washington Capitals, Philadelphia Flyers, Detroit Red Wings, Boston Bruins and Phoenix Coyotes with four winners each, although the Coyotes had two winners in Winnipeg before they moved to Arizona. Bill Barber, Bruce Boudreau and Ken Hitchcock are the only coaches to win the award after replacing the head coach who started the season. Barber took over for Craig Ramsay during the Flyers' 2000–01 season, Boudreau replaced Glen Hanlon a month into the Capitals' 2007–08 season while Hitchcock replaced Davis Payne a month into the Blues' 2011–12 season. The closest vote occurred in 2006, when the winner Lindy Ruff edged out Peter Laviolette by a single point.

== Winners ==
Key

^ Coach is still active
† Coach's team won the Stanley Cup

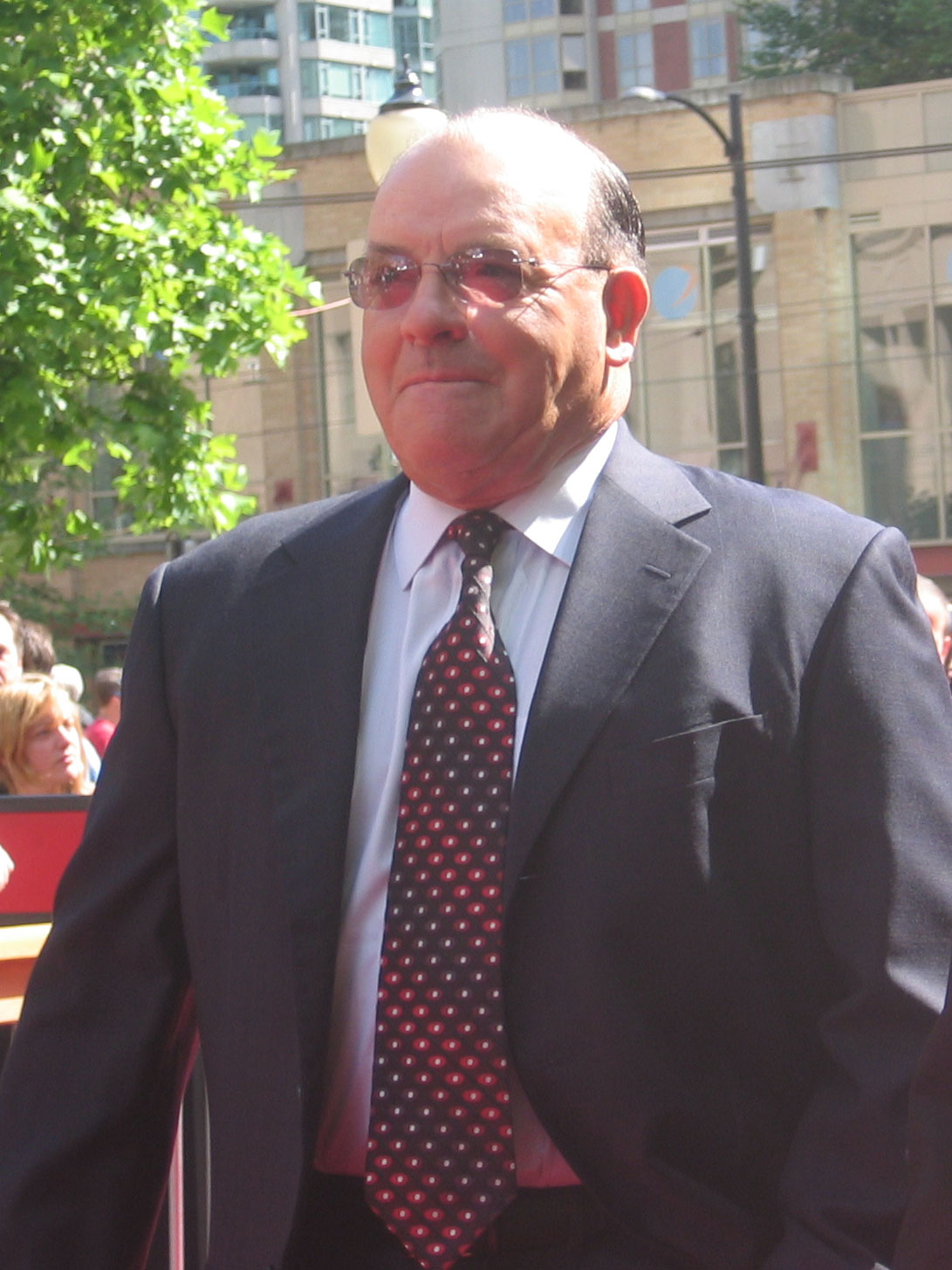
Scotty Bowman, winner for the 1976–77 and 1995–96 NHL seasons.

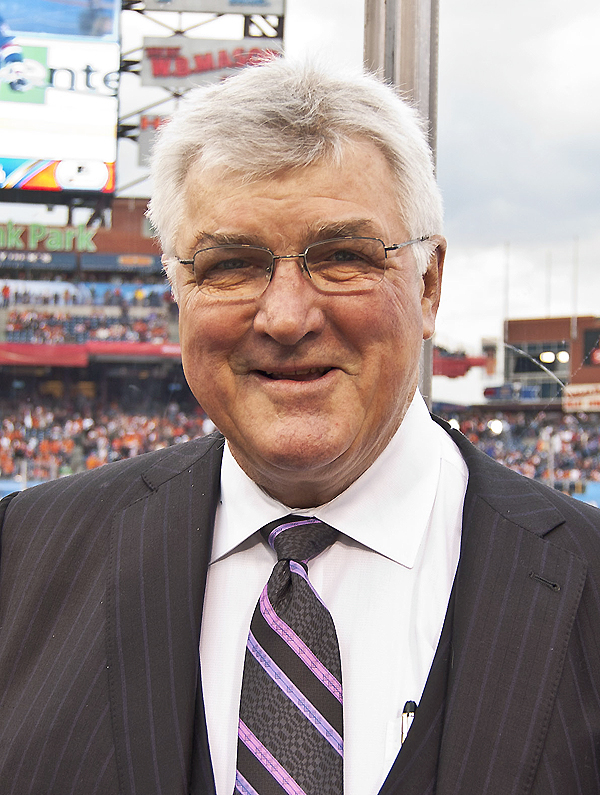
Pat Quinn, winner for the 1979–80 and 1991–92 NHL seasons.

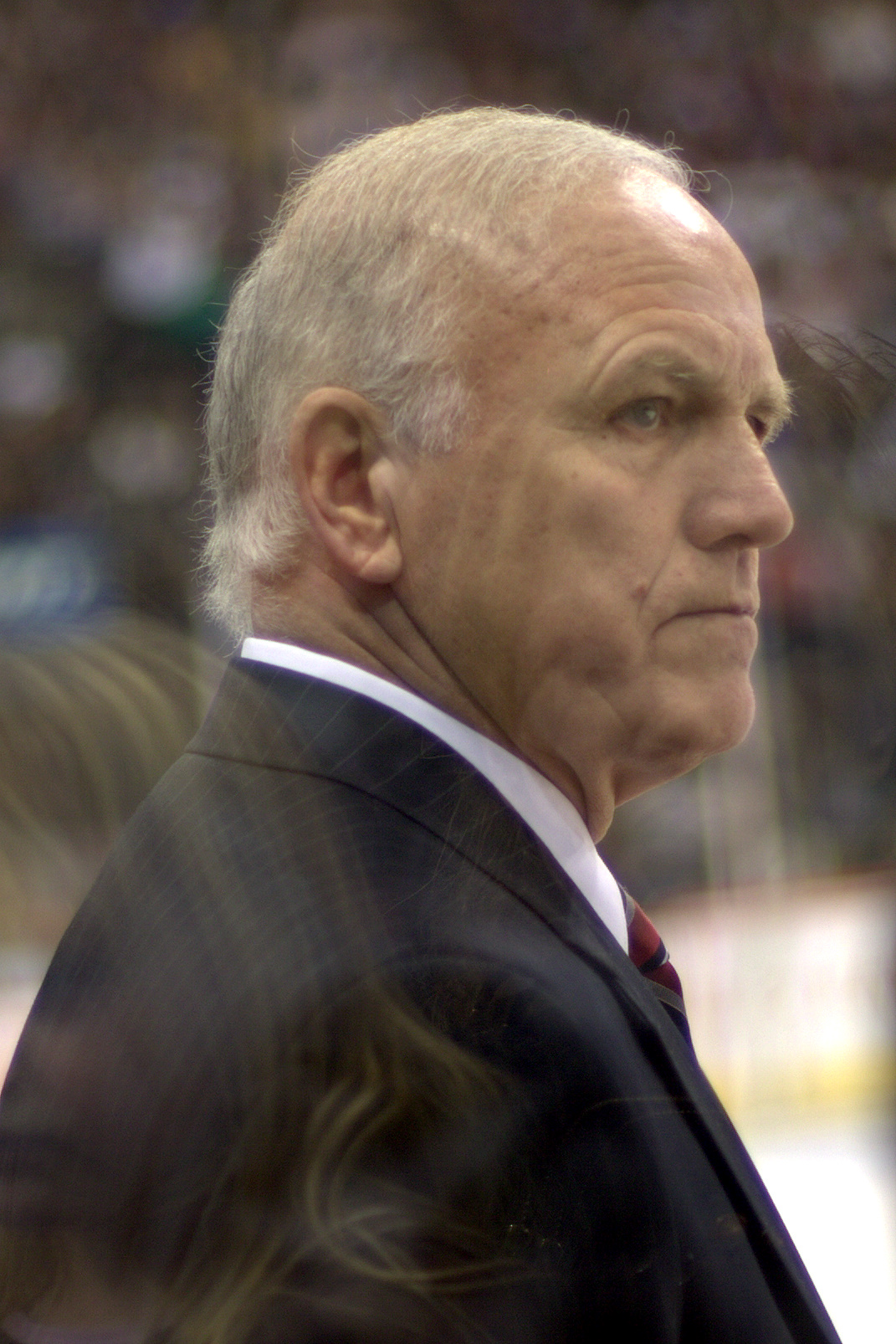
Jacques Lemaire, winner for the 1993–94 and 2002–03 NHL seasons.

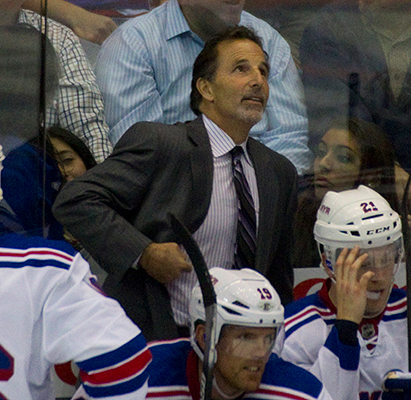
John Tortorella, winner for the 2003–04 and 2016–17 NHL seasons.

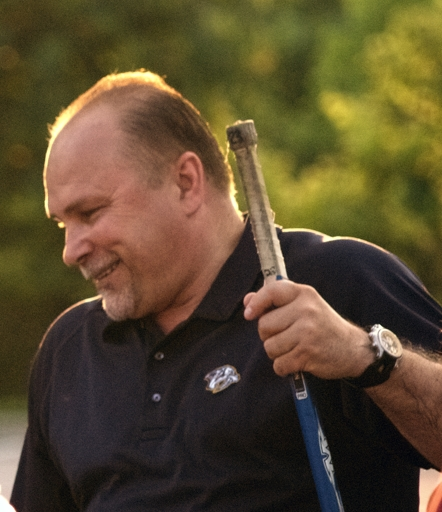
Barry Trotz, winner for the 2015–16 and 2018–19 NHL seasons.

Jack Adams Award winners
Season	Winner	Team	Win #
1973–74	Fred Shero	Philadelphia Flyers†	1
1974–75	Bob Pulford	Los Angeles Kings	1
1975–76	Don Cherry	Boston Bruins	1
1976–77	Scotty Bowman (Note: The coach's team had the best overall record in regular season (Presidents' Trophy awarded to team with best overall record since 1985–86).)	Montreal Canadiens†	1
1977–78	Bobby Kromm	Detroit Red Wings	1
1978–79	Al Arbour	New York Islanders	1
1979–80	Pat Quinn (Note: The coach's team lost the Stanley Cup Final.)	Philadelphia Flyers	1
1980–81	Red Berenson	St. Louis Blues	1
1981–82	Tom Watt	Winnipeg Jets	1
1982–83	Orval Tessier	Chicago Black Hawks	1
1983–84	Bryan Murray	Washington Capitals	1
1984–85	Mike Keenan	Philadelphia Flyers	1
1985–86	Glen Sather	Edmonton Oilers	1
1986–87	Jacques Demers	Detroit Red Wings	1
1987–88	Jacques Demers	Detroit Red Wings	2
1988–89	Pat Burns	Montreal Canadiens	1
1989–90	Bob Murdoch	Winnipeg Jets	1
1990–91	Brian Sutter	St. Louis Blues	1
1991–92	Pat Quinn	Vancouver Canucks	2
1992–93	Pat Burns	Toronto Maple Leafs	2
1993–94	Jacques Lemaire	New Jersey Devils	1
1994–95 (Note: Season was shortened by the 1994–95 NHL lockout.)	Marc Crawford	Quebec Nordiques	1
1995–96	Scotty Bowman	Detroit Red Wings	2
1996–97	Ted Nolan	Buffalo Sabres	1
1997–98	Pat Burns	Boston Bruins	3
1998–99	Jacques Martin	Ottawa Senators	1
1999–2000	Joel Quenneville	St. Louis Blues	1
2000–01	Bill Barber (Note: The coach replaced another coach for that team while the season was in progress.)	Philadelphia Flyers	1
2001–02	Bobby Francis	Phoenix Coyotes	1
2002–03	Jacques Lemaire	Minnesota Wild	2
2003–04	John Tortorella	Tampa Bay Lightning†	1
2004–05	Season cancelled due to the 2004–05 NHL lockout		
2005–06	Lindy Ruff	Buffalo Sabres	1
2006–07	Alain Vigneault	Vancouver Canucks	1
2007–08	Bruce Boudreau	Washington Capitals	1
2008–09	Claude Julien	Boston Bruins	1
2009–10	Dave Tippett	Phoenix Coyotes	1
2010–11	Dan Bylsma	Pittsburgh Penguins	1
2011–12	Ken Hitchcock	St. Louis Blues	1
2012–13 (Note: Season was shortened by the 2012–13 NHL lockout.)	Paul MacLean	Ottawa Senators	1
2013–14	Patrick Roy	Colorado Avalanche	1
2014–15	Bob Hartley	Calgary Flames	1
2015–16	Barry Trotz	Washington Capitals	1
2016–17	John Tortorella	Columbus Blue Jackets	2
2017–18	Gerard Gallant	Vegas Golden Knights	1
2018–19	Barry Trotz	New York Islanders	2
2019–20 (Note: Regular season was shortened by the COVID-19 pandemic.)	Bruce Cassidy	Boston Bruins	1
2020–21	Rod Brind'Amour^	Carolina Hurricanes	1
2021–22	Darryl Sutter	Calgary Flames	1
2022–23	Jim Montgomery^	Boston Bruins	1
2023–24	Rick Tocchet^	Vancouver Canucks	1
2024–25	Spencer Carbery^	Washington Capitals	1
2025–26	Jon Cooper^	Tampa Bay Lightning	1

== See also ==
- List of National Hockey League awards
- List of NHL head coaches
