= Bruce Boudreau =

Canadian ice hockey player and coach (born 1955)

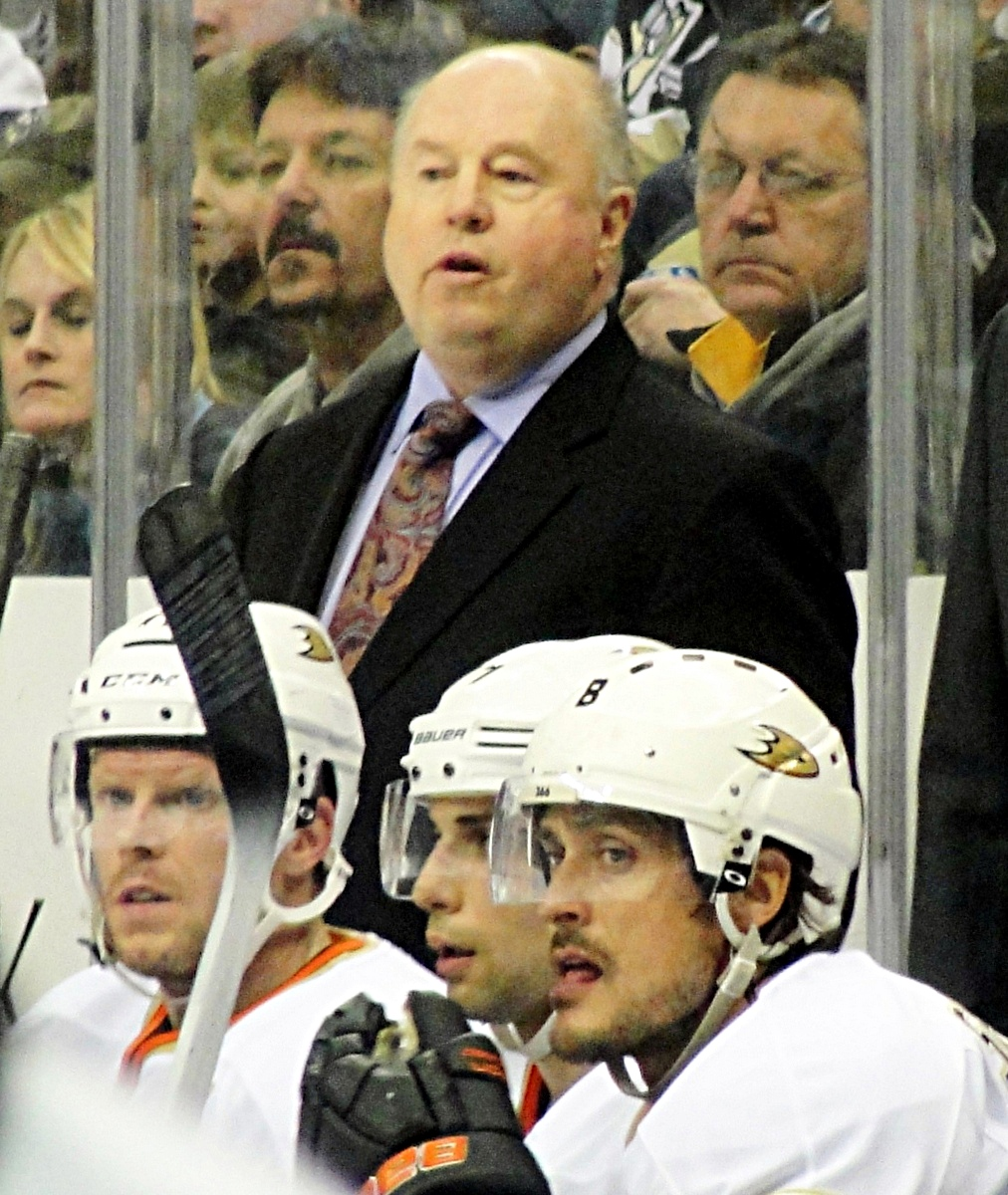
- Boudreau with the Anaheim Ducks in 2012
- Born: January 9, 1955 (age 71) Toronto, Ontario, Canada
- Height: 5 ft 9 in (175 cm)
- Weight: 170 lb (77 kg; 12 st 2 lb)
- Position: Centre
- Shot: Left
- Played for: Minnesota Fighting Saints; Toronto Maple Leafs; Chicago Black Hawks
- Coached for: Washington Capitals; Anaheim Ducks; Minnesota Wild; Vancouver Canucks
- NHL draft: 42nd overall, 1975; Toronto Maple Leafs
- Playing career: 1975–1992
- Coaching career: 1992–present

Bruce Allan Boudreau (/buːdroʊ/ BUU-droh; born January 9, 1955) is a Canadian professional ice hockey coach and former player. He previously served as head coach of the Washington Capitals, Anaheim Ducks, Minnesota Wild, and Vancouver Canucks of the National Hockey League (NHL). As a player, Boudreau played professionally for 20 seasons, and was a third round pick (42nd overall) of the Toronto Maple Leafs at the 1975 NHL amateur draft. He played 141 games in the NHL with the Maple Leafs and Chicago Black Hawks, and 30 games in the World Hockey Association (WHA) with the Minnesota Fighting Saints. Boudreau played most of his career in the American Hockey League (AHL) for various teams where he was known for his goals and point-scoring abilities, recording 316 goals and 483 assists for 799 points in 634 games.

After his playing career Boudreau went into coaching and won the Jack Adams Award for the NHL's most outstanding head coach in the 2007–08 NHL season during his tenure with the Capitals. Boudreau is the owner of two junior ice hockey teams, Minnesota Blue Ox and Hershey Cubs, in the United States Premier Hockey League (USPHL).

As of 2021, Boudreau has the second-highest winning percentage in NHL history for a coach who has coached at least 900 games.

== Early life ==
Boudreau was born in North York, Toronto, Ontario, the son of Norman Boudreau and Theresa Roy. As a youth, he played in the 1967 Quebec International Pee-Wee Hockey Tournament with the Toronto George Bell minor ice hockey team. He attended Nelson A. Boylen Collegiate Institute in the 1970s.

== Playing career ==
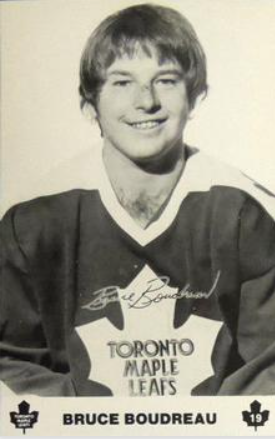
1978 postcard of Boudreau with Toronto Maple Leafs

Boudreau's junior career was spent with the Toronto Marlboros of the Ontario Hockey Association (OHA), for which he averaged over 100 points a season. He scored 165 points in his final season in juniors, adding 44 points in 27 games en route to captaining the Marlies to a Memorial Cup championship. He was awarded the Eddie Powers Memorial Trophy as the top goal scorer for the 1974–75 OMJHL season.

Boudreau played professional ice hockey for 17 seasons. While his major career was modest, he had a long career in the minor leagues, and was one of the most prolific minor league scorers of all time, largely in the American Hockey League (AHL).

After being drafted to the NHL in the third round, 42nd overall, of the 1975 NHL amateur draft by the Toronto Maple Leafs, Boudreau could not agree with Toronto on a contract and joined the Minnesota Fighting Saints of the World Hockey Association (WHA), making his professional debut in 1975. He played a single season for the Fighting Saints, recording three goals and six assists over 30 games. He spent half that season in the minors, with the Johnstown Jets of the North American Hockey League (NAHL).

Boudreau signed with the Maple Leafs for the 1976–77 season. He spent most of the first nine seasons of his career with the Maple Leafs playing with their farm teams – Central Hockey League (CHL) teams Dallas Black Hawks and Cincinnati Tigers, and AHL teams New Brunswick Hawks and St. Catharines Saints. Later in his career, Boudreau signed with the NHL's Chicago Black Hawks, playing two seasons with their AHL farm team Springfield Indians (with whom he won his only league scoring championship in the 1987–88 AHL season). He later played with the International Hockey League's (IHL) Fort Wayne Komets and the AHL's Nova Scotia Oilers.

Boudreau played parts of eight seasons in the NHL, all but the last – a seven-game stint for the Chicago Black Hawks in the 1985–86 season – for the Maple Leafs. His most significant NHL time came in 1980–81; called up as an injury replacement with the Maple Leafs, he recorded 10 goals and 14 assists in only 39 games. During his time in the NHL, Boudreau recorded 28 goals and 42 assists in 141 games.

He continued on as a minor league star and top scorer right through his final 1991–92 AHL season. His final game came in Springfield when – after a full IHL season with the Fort Wayne Komets – he was signed by the AHL's Adirondack Red Wings as an emergency injury replacement during first-round series of the 1992 Calder Cup playoffs against the New Haven Nighthawks.

== Hockey-related endeavours ==
At the start of his professional career, while a member of the Johnstown Jets of the North American Hockey League (NAHL), Boudreau appeared as an extra in the 1977 film Slap Shot; his apartment at the time was used in the film for Paul Newman's character, coach of the fictional Charlestown Chiefs.

Boudreau is the owner of two junior ice hockey teams, Minnesota Blue Ox and Hershey Cubs, in the United States Premier Hockey League (USPHL).

He has joined the NHL Network as an analyst when he is not coaching.

== Personal life ==
Boudreau and his wife have one son. He also has three other children – two sons and a daughter from his first marriage. In 1982, Boudreau started the Golden Horseshoe Hockey School, a youth summer hockey camp operating out of St. Catharines, Ontario, which he continues to coach with in the off-seasons.

Boudreau has been a supporter of the Toronto Maple Leafs since childhood, and admits that he still cheers for the club when the team does not face off against a squad that he is actively coaching, and watches Maple Leafs games on television when he is able to.

Boudreau is known for his talkative personality, earning him the nickname "Gabby". In 2009, he released his memoir, Gabby: Confessions of a Hockey Lifer.

Boudreau's son, Ben, was named head coach of the Ontario Hockey League's Niagara IceDogs in November 2023 after four seasons coaching in the ECHL.

== Career statistics ==
			Regular season					Playoffs
Season	Team	League	GP	G	A	Pts	PIM	GP	G	A	Pts	PIM
1972–73	Toronto Marlboros	OHA-Jr.	61	38	49	87	22	—	—	—	—	—
1972–73	Toronto Marlboros	M-Cup	—	—	—	—	—	3	0	1	1	0
1973–74	Toronto Marlboros	OHA-Jr.	53	46	67	113	51	—	—	—	—	—
1974–75	Toronto Marlboros	OMJHL	69	68	97	165	52	22	12	28	40	26
1974–75	Toronto Marlboros	M-Cup	—	—	—	—	—	5	2	2	4	15
1975–76	Minnesota Fighting Saints	WHA	30	3	6	9	4	—	—	—	—	—
1975–76	Johnstown Jets	NAHL	34	25	35	60	14	9	6	5	11	7
1976–77	Toronto Maple Leafs	NHL	15	2	5	7	4	3	0	0	0	0
1976–77	Dallas Black Hawks	CHL	58	34	37	71	40	1	1	1	2	0
1977–78	Toronto Maple Leafs	NHL	40	11	18	29	12	—	—	—	—	—
1977–78	Dallas Black Hawks	CHL	22	13	9	22	11	—	—	—	—	—
1978–79	Toronto Maple Leafs	NHL	26	4	3	7	2	—	—	—	—	—
1978–79	New Brunswick Hawks	AHL	49	20	38	58	20	5	1	1	2	8
1979–80	Toronto Maple Leafs	NHL	2	0	0	0	2	—	—	—	—	—
1979–80	New Brunswick Hawks	AHL	75	36	54	90	47	17	6	7	13	23
1980–81	Toronto Maple Leafs	NHL	39	10	14	24	18	2	1	0	1	0
1980–81	New Brunswick Hawks	AHL	40	17	41	58	22	8	6	5	11	14
1981–82	Toronto Maple Leafs	NHL	12	0	2	2	6	—	—	—	—	—
1981–82	Cincinnati Tigers	CHL	65	42	61	103	42	4	3	1	4	8
1982–83	St. Catharines Saints	AHL	80	50	72	122	65	—	—	—	—	—
1982–83	Toronto Maple Leafs	NHL	—	—	—	—	—	4	1	0	1	0
1983–84	St. Catharines Saints	AHL	80	47	62	109	44	7	0	5	5	11
1984–85	ECD Iserlohn	1.GBun	30	20	28	48	41	3	2	1	3	4
1984–85	Baltimore Skipjacks	AHL	17	4	7	11	4	15	3	9	12	4
1985–86	Chicago Black Hawks	NHL	7	1	0	1	2	—	—	—	—	—
1985–86	Nova Scotia Oilers	AHL	65	30	36	66	36	—	—	—	—	—
1986–87	Nova Scotia Oilers	AHL	78	35	47	82	40	5	3	3	6	4
1987–88	Springfield Indians	AHL	80	42	74	116	84	—	—	—	—	—
1988–89	Springfield Indians	AHL	50	28	36	64	42	—	—	—	—	—
1988–89	Newmarket Saints	AHL	20	7	16	23	12	4	0	1	1	6
1989–90	Phoenix Roadrunners	IHL	82	41	68	109	89	—	—	—	—	—
1990–91	Fort Wayne Komets	IHL	81	40	80	120	111	19	11	7	18	30
1991–92	Fort Wayne Komets	IHL	77	34	50	84	100	7	3	4	7	10
1991–92	Adirondack Red Wings	AHL	—	—	—	—	—	4	1	1	2	2
NHL totals			141	28	42	70	46	9	2	0	2	0
WHA totals			30	3	6	9	4	—	—	—	—	—
CHL totals			145	92	104	196	93	5	4	2	6	8
AHL totals			634	316	483	799	416	65	20	32	52	72

== Awards, honours and records ==
Records

- Boudreau remains the 16th leading all-time goal-scorer in the AHL with 316, also 13th in assists with 483, and 12th in points with 799. For the minor leagues as a whole, Boudreau is eighth all-time with 1,368 points, and 13th in both goals and assists with 548 and 820 respectively; he is in the top 25 all-time scorers for professional ice hockey.
- Scored 100 points or more for five separate minor league teams.
- Named to the Central Hockey League's First All-Star Team in 1982.
- Named to the American Hockey League's First All-Star Team in 1988.
- Inducted into the 2009 class of the AHL Hall of Fame.

Team records – Springfield Indians

- Assists in a season – 74 (1987–88)
- Points in a season – 116 (1987–88)

Awards

- Eddie Powers Memorial Trophy – 1974–75 OMJHL season (Toronto Marlboros)
- John B. Sollenberger Trophy – 1987–88 AHL season (Springfield Indians)
- Memorial Cup and J. Ross Robertson Cup with the 1974–75 Toronto Marlboros

== Coaching career ==
=== Minor leagues ===
After his playing days were over, Boudreau began a highly successful coaching career. In the minor leagues, Boudreau has coached the Muskegon Fury, Fort Wayne Komets, Mississippi Sea Wolves, Lowell Lock Monsters, Manchester Monarchs, and Hershey Bears.

Under Boudreau's leadership, the Bears won the Calder Cup championship in 2005–06. The Bears made it all the way back to the Calder Cup finals under Boudreau again in 2007, ultimately falling to the Hamilton Bulldogs.

Previously, Boudreau coached the Mississippi Sea Wolves to the Kelly Cup championship in 1998–99, and also led the Fort Wayne Komets to the Turner Cup Final in 1993–94. Boudreau was awarded the Commissioner's Trophy as coach of the 1993–94 Komets.

=== Washington Capitals (2007–2012) ===
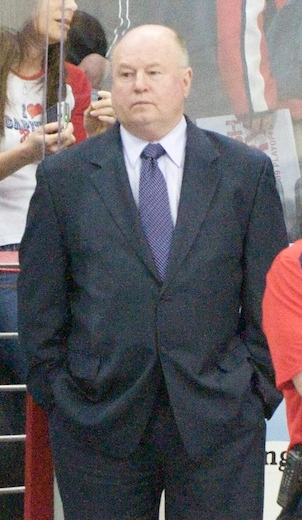
Boudreau while coaching the Washington Capitals

Boudreau was named interim head coach of the NHL's Washington Capitals on November 22, 2007, and later their permanent coach on December 26. He compiled a 37–17–7 rookie coaching record with a team that was 6–14–1 when he inherited it. Under Boudreau's leadership, the 2007–08 Capitals won their first Southeast Division title in seven years and made the playoffs for the first time in five years. He also won the Jack Adams Award as the NHL's best coach in 2007–08.

Boudreau continued his success in his second season as coach of the Capitals, leading the Capitals to a record of 50–24–8 and 108 points, good enough for another Southeast Division title and second in the Eastern Conference.

In his third season with the Capitals, Boudreau led the team to a 54–15–13 record and 121 points, which was not only good enough for a third straight Southeast Division title, but also was the most points in the NHL, leading to the team's first Presidents' Trophy. Their success in the regular season, however, did not carry over to the postseason, as they lost to the eighth-seeded Montreal Canadiens in seven games, losing the last three games of the series.

After a hot start to the 2011–12 season, the Capitals fell apart, posting just four wins in 13 games during the month of November 2011. Alexander Ovechkin and Alexander Semin both vastly underperformed during the stretch. These and other factors led to Boudreau's firing on November 28, despite Boudreau having reached 200 regular season wins faster than any coach in the modern NHL era. He was replaced by former Capitals captain and then-London Knights head coach Dale Hunter.

=== Anaheim Ducks and Minnesota Wild (2012–2020) ===
Two days after he was fired by the Capitals, the Anaheim Ducks hired Boudreau to replace the recently fired Randy Carlyle as their head coach. Boudreau became the fastest coach to be hired after being fired in NHL history.

On April 29, 2016, Boudreau was fired by the Ducks after they lost a game 7 on home ice for the fourth consecutive year. He led the Ducks to four consecutive Pacific Division titles in his four full seasons in Anaheim.

On May 7, 2016, Boudreau was hired by the Minnesota Wild as their new head coach. Boudreau led the Wild to a successful regular season finishing second in the Central Division (earning home-ice advantage for the first round series), but the team fell apart in March 2017, after the Martin Hanzal trade, and collapsed in the first round of the playoffs winning just one game on the road and losing every game at home against the St. Louis Blues. During his fourth season with the Wild, he was fired on February 14, 2020.

=== Vancouver Canucks (2021–2023) ===
On December 5, 2021, Boudreau was named head coach of the Vancouver Canucks, whose poor season to that point had led to the dismissal of both head coach Travis Green and general manager Jim Benning. His immediate positive impact on the team's performance resulted in him being serenaded regularly during home games with a variation of the Tag Team song "Whoomp! (There It Is)" lyric, "Bruce, there it is!" On January 23, 2022, Boudreau coached in his 1,000th career NHL game in a 3–1 loss to the St. Louis Blues. Ultimately, the Canucks would not make the playoffs in Boudreau's first season, despite a significant uptick in performance and a winning record under Boudreau.

In the off-season, the Canucks' new president of hockey operations, Jim Rutherford, indicated that they would not immediately extend Boudreau's contract beyond the option for one more season in his initial arrangement. It was subsequently reported that Rutherford, who had been hired after Boudreau, was initially unaware that the latter's contract contained an option for a second year. After the Canucks began the 2022–23 season with a franchise-record seven-game losing streak, Rutherford became publicly critical of the team's performance and, implicitly, of Boudreau. The Province noted "the optics of the owner first hiring Boudreau and then Rutherford were never good," as it was typically management's job to hire the coach.

By January 2023, as the Canucks continued to sink in the standings, Rutherford admitted that he had been speaking to potential replacements for Boudreau. Days later, it began to be reported that Boudreau would soon be replaced by Rick Tocchet. The unusual spectacle of an NHL coach continuing in his job as a lame duck began to attract considerable media attention. Addressing the rumours in advance of a January 20 game, Boudreau acknowledged "I'd be a fool to say I don't know what's going on." Despite the team subsequently losing that game to the Colorado Avalanche by a score of 4–1, fans in the stands revived the "Bruce, there it is!" chant in support of Boudreau. Speaking afterward, he said that "I've only been here a year, but it'll go down in my memory books out of the 48 years I've played and coached as the most incredible thing I've experienced on a personal level other than winning championships." On January 21, with media reports that Boudreau would be formally replaced the following Monday (January 23), he oversaw what was believed to be his final game as coach, with the team falling 4–2 to the Edmonton Oilers. He was again saluted by the audience, and said that numerous players had approached him after the game to bid farewell, though he had not heard anything from management. On January 22, the Canucks announced that Boudreau had been fired and replaced by Tocchet. The saga of Boudreau's firing, particularly the publicly-perceived mistreatment of the coach in his final few weeks, became a major news story that was widely reported on beyond the sports world, with criticism being directed towards Rutherford and Canucks management for their treatment of Boudreau. During Tocchet's subsequent introductory press conference, Rutherford apologized for the manner in which Boudreau's dismissal had been handled.

=== Canada national team (2023) ===
In December 2023, Boudreau coached Canada national team at the 2023 Spengler Cup. This appearance marked Boudreau's international coaching debut.

== Head coaching record ==
Team	Year	Regular season						Postseason		
Team	Year	G	W	L	OTL	Pts	Division Rank	W	L	Result
WSH	2007–08	61	37	17	7	(81)	1st in Southeast	3	4	Lost in conference quarterfinals (PHI)
WSH	2008–09	82	50	24	8	108	1st in Southeast	7	7	Lost in conference semifinals (PIT)
WSH	2009–10	82	54	15	13	121	1st in Southeast	3	4	Lost in conference quarterfinals (MTL)
WSH	2010–11	82	48	23	11	107	1st in Southeast	4	5	Lost in conference semifinals (TBL)
WSH	2011–12	22	12	9	1	(25)	(fired)	—	—	—
WSH total		329	201	88	40			17	20	4 playoff appearances
ANA	2011–12	58	27	23	8	(62)	5th in Pacific	—	—	Missed playoffs
ANA	2012–13	48	30	12	6	66	1st in Pacific	3	4	Lost in conference quarterfinals (DET)
ANA	2013–14	82	54	20	8	116	1st in Pacific	7	6	Lost in second round (LAK)
ANA	2014–15	82	51	24	7	109	1st in Pacific	11	5	Lost in conference finals (CHI)
ANA	2015–16	82	46	25	11	103	1st in Pacific	3	4	Lost in first round (NSH)
ANA total		352	208	104	40			24	19	4 playoff appearances
MIN	2016–17	82	49	25	8	106	2nd in Central	1	4	Lost in first round (STL)
MIN	2017–18	82	45	26	11	101	3rd in Central	1	4	Lost in first round (WPG)
MIN	2018–19	82	37	36	9	83	7th in Central	—	—	Missed playoffs
MIN	2019–20	57	27	23	7	(61)	(fired)	—	—	—
MIN total		303	158	110	35			2	8	2 playoff appearances
VAN	2021–22	57	32	15	10	(74)	5th in Pacific	—	—	Missed playoffs
VAN	2022–23	46	18	25	3	(39)	(fired)	—	—	—
VAN total		103	50	40	13			—	—	
Total		1,087	617	342	128			43	47	10 playoff appearances

Awards
Preceded by Alain Vigneault	Jack Adams Award winner 2007–08	Succeeded by Claude Julien
Sporting positions
Preceded by Glen Hanlon	Head coach of the Washington Capitals; 2007–2011	Succeeded by Dale Hunter
Preceded by Randy Carlyle	Head coach of the Anaheim Ducks; 2011–2016	Succeeded by Randy Carlyle
Preceded by John Torchetti (interim)	Head coach of the Minnesota Wild; 2016–2020	Succeeded by Dean Evason (interim)
Preceded by Travis Green	Head coach of the Vancouver Canucks; 2021–2023	Succeeded by Rick Tocchet
