= Jacques Lemaire =

Canadian ice hockey player and coach (born 1945)

- Hockey Hall of Fame, 1984
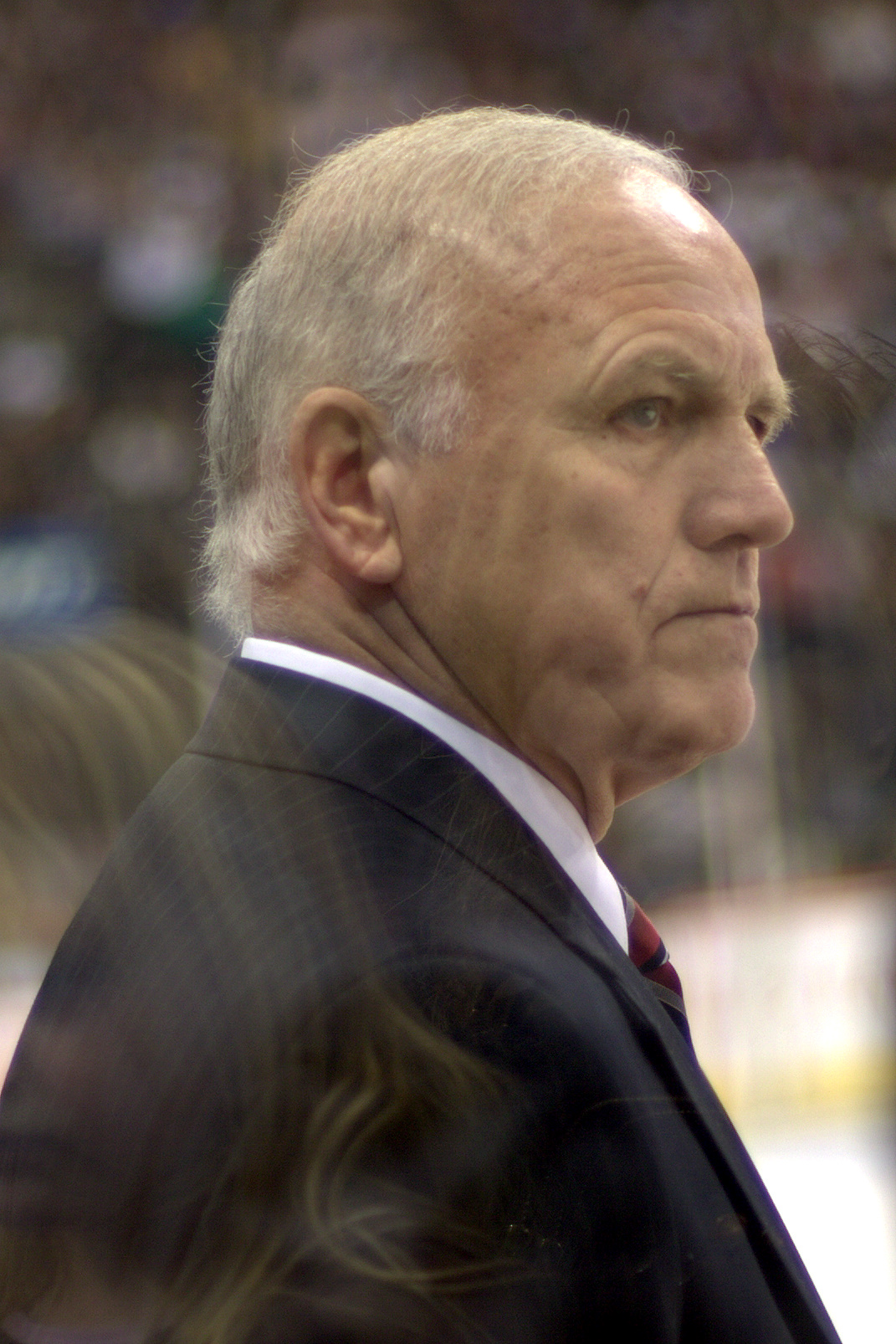
- Lemaire with the Minnesota Wild in 2009
- Born: September 7, 1945 (age 81) LaSalle, Quebec, Canada
- Height: 5 ft 10 in (178 cm)
- Weight: 180 lb (82 kg; 12 st 12 lb)
- Position: Centre
- Shot: Left
- Played for: Montreal Canadiens
- Coached for: Montreal Canadiens; New Jersey Devils; Minnesota Wild
- NHL draft: Undrafted
- Playing career: 1967–1981
- Coaching career: 1984–2011

Jacques Gérard Lemaire (born September 7, 1945) is a Canadian former ice hockey forward and head coach who was inducted into the Hockey Hall of Fame in 1984. He spent his entire twelve-year National Hockey League (NHL) playing career with the Montreal Canadiens (1967–1979) and was a part of eight Stanley Cup championship teams in 1968, 1969, 1971, 1973, 1976, 1977, 1978 and 1979. When he retired, he was the first player to have played at least ten seasons and recorded a 20-goal season each time. In 2017, Lemaire was named one of the 100 Greatest NHL Players.

Lemaire was an NHL head coach for seventeen seasons with the Canadiens (1983–1985), New Jersey Devils (1993–1998, 2009–2011) and Minnesota Wild (2000–2009). One of 24 coaches with 600 wins (as of 2025), Lemaire led the Devils to their first Stanley Cup in the 1994–95 season.

After retiring at the end of the 2010–11 NHL season, Lemaire accepted a position as special assignment coach for the Devils. He most recently worked as a special assignment coach for the New York Islanders, a position he previously held with the Toronto Maple Leafs.

== Career ==
=== Playing career ===
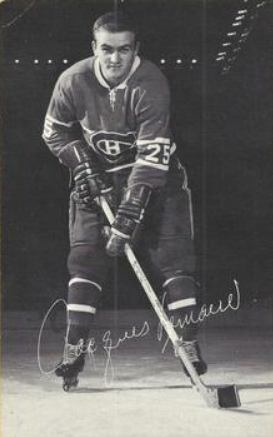
Lemaire in 1968 photo for Montreal Canadiens

In 853 career NHL games, Lemaire recorded 366 goals and 469 assists for a total of 835 points. A model of consistency, Lemaire scored at least 20 goals in each of his 12 seasons. Lemaire learned to execute his slapshot when he was young using a heavy steel puck, making his shot second only to that of Bobby Hull for speed and accuracy. In his bestselling book The Game former Montreal goalie Ken Dryden described a unique relationship on ice that was developing between Lemaire and Guy Lafleur, as they complemented each other's speed and shooting ability.

Lemaire is one of six NHL players to have scored two Stanley Cup-winning goals, achieving the feat in both 1977 and 1979 (The five other players are Mike Bossy in 1982 and 1983, Bobby Orr in 1970 and 1972, Henri Richard in 1966 and 1971, Jean Béliveau in 1960 and 1965 and Toe Blake in 1944 and 1946). One of the two Cup-winners scored by Lemaire came at the 4:32 mark of the first overtime of game four in the 1977 Stanley Cup Final. Another famous goal by Lemaire was in the deciding game seven of the 1971 Final, when he scored with a shot from center ice to beat Tony Esposito to cut the Canadiens' deficit to 2-1; Lemaire then assisted on Henri Richard's game-tying goal.

Lemaire's NHL playing career ended following the 1978–79 season when he surprisingly rejected the Canadiens' contract extension offer of $225,000 for each of five years. Lemaire left the NHL to become a playing coach in Switzerland.

=== Coaching career ===
Lemaire signed a three-year contract as player, coach and general manager of HC Sierre on June 15, 1979. He was paid $75,000 tax-free annually and had absolute control over his contract. "I always wanted to do something reckless, have an adventure, see how other people live, discover something new. Well, that time is now. I've always been interested in coaching, and when this opportunity presented itself, it seemed like the perfect thing," he explained.

He made his North American coaching debut in 1981, serving as an assistant coach at SUNY Plattsburgh to future NHL scout Herb Hammond at the NCAA Division III level.

Lemaire then served as head coach of the Canadiens from 1983–1985. The 1983–84 season produced Montreal's first losing record of the expansion era, and resulted Lemaire replacing Bob Berry 63 games into the season. At first, Lemaire's hiring was seen as a success as he guided the Canadiens to their first playoff series victories since 1980 and reached the Wales Conference Final. Though Lemaire had been Guy Lafleur's centreman during many of the glory years of the 1970s, the former linemates quickly struggled to transform their relationship to an amicable one between coach and player. In time, Lemaire became renowned as one of the NHL's finest defensively-minded coaches. Lafleur was always an offensive-minded player who believed his productivity overshadowed any defensive weaknesses. Lemaire's insistence that everyone on his teams contribute defensively promptly caused a rift between him and Lafleur that never healed. By 1985, due to a rocky relationship with Lemaire, Lafleur felt this had become intolerable and requested a trade. General manager Serge Savard refused Lafleur's request, as trading one of the most popular players in Canadiens history would have incurred a severe backlash from fans and the media. With no other options, Lafleur decided to retire, and his departure from the Canadiens was considered acrimonious. Lemaire was succeeded as Canadiens head coach by Jean Perron for the 1985-86 season. Lemaire then served as assistant general manager of the Canadiens, including their Stanley Cup wins in 1986 and 1993.

He then served as head coach of the New Jersey Devils from 1993 to 1998, winning the Jack Adams Award in 1994 while the Devils reached the Eastern Conference finals where they pushed the eventual Cup-winning New York Rangers to seven games. In the lockout-shortened 1994-95 season, although the Devils' regular season was unimpressive, they won the Stanley Cup in 1995 (his 11th Stanley Cup ring) in a four-game sweep over the Detroit Red Wings (led by Scotty Bowman, who was head coach of the Canadiens during Lemaire's playing days) who were the Presidents' Trophy winners, thanks to Lemaire's use of the neutral zone trap that stymied the Red Wings. However, the Devils missed the playoffs in 1995-96. Lemaire then served as head coach of the Minnesota Wild from June 19, 2000 until April 11, 2009, the first head coach of the organization, winning the Jack Adams Award in 2003.

Lemaire is known for his unorthodox coaching style for several reasons: first, he prefers a defensive-minded system, often using a strategy called the neutral zone trap. Second, Lemaire rarely uses permanent lines preferring to use mixed line combinations during games. Third, Lemaire never employed a permanent team captain during his tenure with the Wild, opting to rotate it on a monthly basis amongst the players. Lemaire is also regarded as one of the best teaching coaches – developing young players while working well with veterans. However his emphasis on "defense first" has often been controversial, both inside and outside the dressing room. This, perhaps, has led to some conflict with star players like Guy Lafleur and Marian Gaborik (formerly with the Wild) and media criticism. An example was provided by Terry Frei of ESPN.com in an article posted on August 4, 2008:

He [Lemaire] helped drag down the entertainment quotient in this league, and despite all the talk about the Wild being a skating team that uses speed and pounces on turnovers, not all the elements of the trap have disappeared from Minnesota's game. You'd think the State of Hockey is going to tire of that at some point, especially if the Wild slide this season and it drives Marian Gaborik away next summer.

On one occasion, Lemaire's team was among the top two scoring teams in the NHL. In 1993–1994, the New Jersey Devils team scored the second most goals in the league (306).

In June 2009, Lemaire was named assistant coach of Team Canada for the 2010 Winter Olympics in Vancouver, British Columbia. He joined Lindy Ruff and Ken Hitchcock as assistants to head coach Mike Babcock and helped Team Canada to the gold medal.

On July 13, 2009, exactly two years after Brent Sutter had been introduced as coach of the Devils, Lemaire returned to the head coaching position for the Devils.

On October 8, 2009, Lemaire got his 200th win with the New Jersey Devils and first of the 2009–10 NHL season.

Lemaire announced his retirement as a head coach in the NHL on April 26, 2010. However, on December 23, 2010, after Devils head coach John MacLean was fired after 33 games, Lemaire came out of retirement to coach once again for the Devils and led a charge that took the team from the bottom of league standings into contention for a playoff position before fading in the final few weeks.

On February 10, 2011, Lemaire achieved his 600th regular-season win after Ilya Kovalchuk scored in overtime to win the game for New Jersey against Toronto 2–1. Lemaire became only the eighth coach in NHL history to achieve this feat.

On April 10, 2011 Lemaire announced his permanent retirement from the Devils.

On August 14, 2015, the Toronto Maple Leafs announced they had hired Lemaire as a special assignment coach.

On September 14, 2018, Lemaire followed Lou Lamoriello to the New York Islanders, assuming the role of Special Assignment Coach. Lemaire was inducted into the New Jersey Devils Ring of Honor on January 22, 2025.

== Personal life and legacy ==
Lemaire is the uncle of former NHL goaltender Manny Fernandez.

There is a hockey arena in LaSalle, Quebec named after Lemaire.

== Career statistics ==
=== Regular season and playoffs ===
			Regular season					Playoffs
Season	Team	League	GP	G	A	Pts	PIM	GP	G	A	Pts	PIM
1962–63	Lachine Maroons	QJHL	42	41	63	104	—	—	—	—	—	—
1963–64	Montreal Junior Canadiens	OHA	42	25	30	55	17	17	10	6	16	4
1964–65	Montreal Junior Canadiens	OHA	56	25	47	72	52	7	1	5	6	0
1964–65	Quebec Aces	AHL	1	0	0	0	0	—	—	—	—	—
1965–66	Montreal Junior Canadiens	OHA	48	41	52	93	69	10	11	2	13	14
1966–67	Houston Apollos	CPHL	69	19	30	49	19	6	0	1	1	0
1967–68	Montreal Canadiens	NHL	69	22	20	42	16	13	7	6	13	6
1968–69	Montreal Canadiens	NHL	75	29	34	63	29	14	4	2	6	6
1969–70	Montreal Canadiens	NHL	69	32	28	60	16	—	—	—	—	—
1970–71	Montreal Canadiens	NHL	78	28	28	56	18	20	9	10	19	17
1971–72	Montreal Canadiens	NHL	77	32	49	81	26	6	2	1	3	2
1972–73	Montreal Canadiens	NHL	77	44	51	95	16	17	7	13	20	2
1973–74	Montreal Canadiens	NHL	66	29	38	67	10	6	0	4	4	2
1974–75	Montreal Canadiens	NHL	80	36	56	92	20	11	5	7	12	4
1975–76	Montreal Canadiens	NHL	61	20	32	52	20	13	3	3	6	2
1976–77	Montreal Canadiens	NHL	75	34	41	75	22	14	7	12	19	6
1977–78	Montreal Canadiens	NHL	76	36	61	97	14	15	6	8	14	10
1978–79	Montreal Canadiens	NHL	50	24	31	55	10	16	11	12	23	6
1979–80	HC Sierre	SWI-2	28	29	16	45	—	—	—	—	—	—
1980–81	HC Sierre	SWI-2	38	49	38	87	—	—	—	—	—	—
NHL totals			853	366	469	835	217	145	61	78	139	63

== Coaching record ==
Team	Year	Regular season							Postseason			
Team	Year	G	W	L	T	OTL	Pts	Finish	W	L	Win %	Result
MTL	1983–84	17	7	10	0	–	14	4th in Adams	9	6	.600	Lost in conference finals (NYI)
MTL	1984–85	80	41	27	12	–	94	1st in Adams	6	6	.500	Lost in division finals (QUE)
MTL total		97	48	37	12	—			15	12	.556	2 playoff appearances
NJD	1993–94	84	47	25	12	—	106	2nd in Atlantic	11	9	.550	Lost in conference finals (NYR)
NJD	1994–95	48	22	18	8	—	52	2nd in Atlantic	16	4	.800	Won Stanley Cup (DET)
NJD	1995–96	82	37	33	12	—	86	6th in Atlantic	—	—	—	Missed playoffs
NJD	1996–97	82	45	23	14	—	104	1st in Atlantic	5	5	.500	Lost in conference semifinals (NYR)
NJD	1997–98	82	48	23	11	—	107	1st in Atlantic	2	4	.333	Lost in conference quarterfinals (OTT)
MIN	2000–01	82	25	39	13	5	68	5th in Northwest	—	—	—	Missed playoffs
MIN	2001–02	82	26	35	12	9	73	5th in Northwest	—	—	—	Missed playoffs
MIN	2002–03	82	42	29	10	1	95	3rd in Northwest	8	10	.444	Lost in conference finals (MDA)
MIN	2003–04	82	30	29	20	3	83	5th in Northwest	—	—	—	Missed playoffs
MIN	2005–06	82	38	36	—	8	84	5th in Northwest	—	—	—	Missed playoffs
MIN	2006–07	82	48	26	—	8	104	2nd in Northwest	1	4	.200	Lost in conference quarterfinals (ANA)
MIN	2007–08	82	44	28	—	10	98	1st in Northwest	2	4	.333	Lost in conference quarterfinals (COL)
MIN	2008–09	82	40	33	—	9	89	3rd in Northwest	—	—	—	Missed playoffs
MIN total		656	293	255	55	53			11	18	.379	3 playoff appearances
NJD	2009–10	82	48	27	—	7	103	1st in Atlantic	1	4	.200	Lost in conference quarterfinals (PHI)
NJD	2010–11	49	29	17	—	3	61	4th in Atlantic	—	—	—	Missed playoffs
NJD total		509	276	166	57	10			35	26	.574	5 playoff appearances
Total		1,262	617	458	124	63	1,421		61	56	.521	10 playoff appearances 1 Stanley Cup

== See also ==
- Notable families in the NHL
- List of members of the Hockey Hall of Fame
- List of National Hockey League head coaching wins and point percentage leaders

Preceded by Pat Burns; Bob Francis	Winner of the Jack Adams Award; 1994; 2003	Succeeded by Marc Crawford; John Tortorella
Preceded by Bob Berry	Head coach of the Montreal Canadiens; 1984–85	Succeeded by Jean Perron
Preceded by Herb Brooks	Head coach of the New Jersey Devils (first time); 1993–98	Succeeded by Robbie Ftorek
Preceded by Position created	Head coach of the Minnesota Wild; 2000–09	Succeeded by Todd Richards
Preceded by Brent Sutter	Head coach of the New Jersey Devils (second time); 2009–10	Succeeded by John MacLean
Preceded by John MacLean	Head coach of the New Jersey Devils (third time); 2010–11	Succeeded by Peter DeBoer
