= Alpine skiing at the 1948 Winter Olympics – Women's downhill =

The women's alpine skiing downhill event was part of the alpine skiing at the 1948 Winter Olympics programme. It was the first appearance of the event. The competition was held on Monday, February 2; thirty-seven alpine skiers from eleven nations competed.

== Medalists ==
Gold	Silver	Bronze
Hedy Schlunegger; Switzerland	Trude Beiser; Austria	Resi Hammerer; Austria

== Results ==
This race was also part of the alpine combined event.

Place	Competitor	Time	Difference
1	Hedy Schlunegger (SUI)	2:28.3	—
2	Trude Beiser (AUT)	2:29.1	+0.8
3	Resi Hammerer (AUT)	2:30.2	+1.9
4	Celina Seghi (ITA)	2:31.1	+2.8
5	Lina Mittner (SUI)	2:31.2	+2.9
6	Suzanne Thiollière (FRA)	2:31.4	+3.1
7	Laila Schou Nilsen (NOR)	2:32.4	+4.1
7	Françoise Gignoux (FRA)	2:32.4	+4.1
9	Rosemarie Bleuer (SUI)	2:33.3	+5.0
10	Lucienne Schmidt-Couttet (FRA)	2:35.2	+6.9
11	Antoinette Meyer (SUI)	2:35.4	+7.1
12	Brynhild Grasmoen (USA)	2:36.0	+7.7
13	Gretchen Fraser (USA)	2:37.1	+8.8
14	Irène Molitor (SUI)	2:37.2	+8.9
14	Alexandra Nekvapilová (TCH)	2:37.2	+8.9
16	Annelore Zückert (AUT)	2:38.4	+10.1
17	Anneliese Schuh-Proxauf (AUT)	2:39.0	+10.7
18	May Nilsson (SWE)	2:39.1	+10.8
19	Erika Mahringer (AUT)	2:39.3	+11.0
20	Ruth-Marie Stewart (USA)	2:42.0	+13.7
21	Fernande Bayetto (FRA)	2:43.1	+14.8
22	Rebecca Cremer (USA)	2:44.2	+15.9
23	Borghild Niskin (NOR)	2:44.4	+16.1
23	Olivia Ausoni (SUI)	2:45.1	+16.8
25	Božena Moserová (TCH)	2:46.1	+17.8
26	Sophie Nogler (AUT)	2:47.0	+18.7
27	Isobel Roe (GBR)	2:47.3	+19.0
28	Paula Kann (USA)	2:49.0	+20.7
29	Micheline Desmazières (FRA)	2:50.2	+21.9
30	Rosemary Sparrow (GBR)	2:50.3	+22.0
31	Georgette Miller-Thiollière (FRA)	2:52.4	+24.1
32	Renata Carraretto (ITA)	2:59.1	+30.8
33	Sheena Mackintosh (GBR)	3:00.0	+31.7
34	Xanthe Ryder (GBR)	3:01.4	+33.1
35	Andrea Mead (USA)	3:03.1	+34.8
36	Anikó Iglói (HUN)	3:07.1	+38.8
37	Rhona Wurtele (CAN)	3:26.1	+57.8
