= List of Olympic medalists in alpine skiing =

Alpine skiing is an Olympic sport, contested at the Winter Olympic Games. The first Winter Olympics, held in 1924, included Nordic skiing, but the first alpine skiing events were not held until 1936 in Garmisch-Partenkirchen, Germany. A combined event was held for both men and women in 1936. The International Ski Federation (FIS) decided that ski instructors could not compete in 1936 because they were professionals, and the Olympics were meant for amateur athletes. Because of this, Austrian and Swiss skiers boycotted the events, although some Austrians decided to compete for Germany.

== Summary ==
Due to World War II, no games were held in 1940 or 1944. Two new alpine events were added in 1948: downhill and slalom. Combined events were also held in 1948, but were dropped after that and not contested again at the Olympics until 1988. The giant slalom debuted at the Olympics in 1952 and the Olympic program was three events for both men and women through 1984.

Since 1988, events for both men and women have been held in five disciplines: downhill, slalom, giant slalom, super-G (since 1988), and combined. From 1948 to 1980, the Winter Olympics also served as the World Championships in Olympic years (with separate competitions held in even-numbered non-Olympic years). Since 1985, the World Championships have been scheduled every odd-numbered year, independent of the Winter Olympics.

Kjetil André Aamodt of Norway is the most-decorated Olympic alpine skier with eight medals (four gold, two silver, two bronze). He was the oldest gold medalist (age 34 in 2006) in Olympic alpine skiing, until passed by several months in 2014 by Mario Matt, also 34. Austrian Traudl Hecher remains the youngest medalist in Olympic alpine skiing; she won bronze in the downhill at age 16 in 1960. Michela Figini of Switzerland is the youngest champion in Olympic alpine skiing history, with a gold medal in downhill at age 17 in 1984. Two Americans set age records in 2014: Mikaela Shiffrin, age 18, became the youngest Olympic slalom champion and Bode Miller became the oldest medalist in Olympic alpine skiing, with a bronze in the super-G at age 36. Croatian Janica Kostelić has won the most medals of any woman, with six (four gold, two silver). In 1952, American Andrea Mead Lawrence became the first female alpine skier to win two gold medals; Henri Oreiller of France won two golds and a bronze in 1948. Alberto Tomba of Italy was the first to successfully defend an Olympic alpine title, in giant slalom in 1992. Five others have since repeated, Aamodt in super-G in 2006, his third win in the event, and four women: Katja Seizinger, Deborah Compagnoni, Kostelić, and Maria Höfl-Riesch.

At the 1956 Games, Austrian Toni Sailer became the first to win gold in all of the available events; the feat was later repeated by France's Jean-Claude Killy in 1968. Sailer, age 20 in 1956, remains the youngest male gold medalist and was the youngest male medalist until 2014, when Henrik Kristoffersen of Norway took bronze in the slalom at age 19. Sailer (1956), Killy (1968), Janica Kostelić (2002), and Franjo von Allmen (2026) are the only athletes winning three golds at the same Olympics.

Austrians have won a combined 121 medals, including 37 golds, more than any other nation. At least one Austrian has won a medal every year, except in 1936, in which Austrian men did not compete. A total of 154 gold medals, 155 silver medals and 152 bronze medals have been awarded since 1936 and have been won by alpine racers from 25 National Olympic Committees (NOC).

== Men ==
=== Downhill ===
==== Downhill podiums ====
| Games | Event | Gold | | Silver | | Bronze | |
| Games | Event | Athlete | NOC | Athlete | NOC | Athlete | NOC |
|---|---|---|---|---|---|---|---|
| 1948 St. Moritz | Details | Henri Oreiller | France | Franz Gabl | Austria | Karl Molitor; Rolf Olinger | Switzerland; Switzerland |
| 1952 Oslo | Details | Zeno Colò | Italy | Othmar Schneider | Austria | Christian Pravda | Austria |
| 1956 Cortina d'Ampezzo | Details | Toni Sailer | Austria | Raymond Fellay | Switzerland | Anderl Molterer | Austria |
| 1960 Squaw Valley | Details | Jean Vuarnet | France | Hans-Peter Lanig | United Team of Germany | Guy Périllat | France |
| 1964 Innsbruck | Details | Egon Zimmermann | Austria | Léo Lacroix | France | Wolfgang Bartels | United Team of Germany |
| 1968 Grenoble | Details | Jean-Claude Killy | France | Guy Périllat | France | Jean-Daniel Dätwyler | Switzerland |
| 1972 Sapporo | Details | Bernhard Russi | Switzerland | Roland Collombin | Switzerland | Heinrich Messner | Austria |
| 1976 Innsbruck | Details | Franz Klammer | Austria | Bernhard Russi | Switzerland | Herbert Plank | Italy |
| 1980 Lake Placid | Details | Leonhard Stock | Austria | Peter Wirnsberger | Austria | Steve Podborski | Canada |
| 1984 Sarajevo | Details | Bill Johnson | United States | Peter Müller | Switzerland | Anton Steiner | Austria |
| 1988 Calgary | Details | Pirmin Zurbriggen | Switzerland | Peter Müller | Switzerland | Franck Piccard | France |
| 1992 Albertville | Details | Patrick Ortlieb | Austria | Franck Piccard | France | Günther Mader | Austria |
| 1994 Lillehammer | Details | Tommy Moe | United States | Kjetil André Aamodt | Norway | Ed Podivinsky | Canada |
| 1998 Nagano | Details | Jean-Luc Crétier | France | Lasse Kjus | Norway | Hannes Trinkl | Austria |
| 2002 Salt Lake City | Details | Fritz Strobl | Austria | Lasse Kjus | Norway | Stephan Eberharter | Austria |
| 2006 Turin | Details | Antoine Dénériaz | France | Michael Walchhofer | Austria | Bruno Kernen | Switzerland |
| 2010 Vancouver | Details | Didier Défago | Switzerland | Aksel Lund Svindal | Norway | Bode Miller | United States |
| 2014 Sochi | Details | Matthias Mayer | Austria | Christof Innerhofer | Italy | Kjetil Jansrud | Norway |
| 2018 Pyeongchang | Details | Aksel Lund Svindal | Norway | Kjetil Jansrud | Norway | Beat Feuz | Switzerland |
| 2022 Beijing | Details | Beat Feuz | Switzerland | Johan Clarey | France | Matthias Mayer | Austria |
| 2026 Milano Cortina | Details | Franjo von Allmen | Switzerland | Giovanni Franzoni | Italy | Dominik Paris | Italy |

==== Downhill medals by nation ====
| Rank | NOC | Gold | Silver | Bronze | Total |
|---|---|---|---|---|---|
| 1 | Austria | 7 | 4 | 8 | 19 |
| 2 | Switzerland | 5 | 5 | 5 | 15 |
| 3 | France | 5 | 4 | 2 | 11 |
| 4 | United States | 2 | 0 | 1 | 3 |
| 5 | Norway | 1 | 5 | 1 | 7 |
| 6 | Italy | 1 | 2 | 2 | 5 |
| 7 | Germany | 0 | 1 | 1 | 2 |
| 8 | Canada | 0 | 0 | 2 | 2 |
| Total | 8 nations | 21 | 21 | 22 | 64 |

Note: the German medals are all consolidated in current Germany's NOC.

=== Super-G ===
==== Super-G podiums ====
| Games | Event | Gold | | Silver | | Bronze | |
| Games | Event | Athlete | NOC | Athlete | NOC | Athlete | NOC |
|---|---|---|---|---|---|---|---|
| 1988 Calgary | Details | Franck Piccard | France | Helmut Mayer | Austria | Lars-Börje Eriksson | Sweden |
| 1992 Albertville | Details | Kjetil André Aamodt | Norway | Marc Girardelli | Luxembourg | Jan Einar Thorsen | Norway |
| 1994 Lillehammer | Details | Markus Wasmeier | Germany | Tommy Moe | United States | Kjetil André Aamodt | Norway |
| 1998 Nagano | Details | Hermann Maier | Austria | Didier Cuche | Switzerland | None awarded | |
| 1998 Nagano | Details | Hermann Maier | Austria | Hans Knauß | Austria | None awarded | |
| 2002 Salt Lake City | Details | Kjetil André Aamodt | Norway | Stephan Eberharter | Austria | Andreas Schifferer | Austria |
| 2006 Turin | Details | Kjetil André Aamodt | Norway | Hermann Maier | Austria | Ambrosi Hoffmann | Switzerland |
| 2010 Vancouver | Details | Aksel Lund Svindal | Norway | Bode Miller | United States | Andrew Weibrecht | United States |
| 2014 Sochi | Details | Kjetil Jansrud | Norway | Andrew Weibrecht | United States | Jan Hudec; Bode Miller | Canada; United States |
| 2018 Pyeongchang | Details | Matthias Mayer | Austria | Beat Feuz | Switzerland | Kjetil Jansrud | Norway |
| 2022 Beijing | Details | Matthias Mayer | Austria | Ryan Cochran-Siegle | United States | Aleksander Aamodt Kilde | Norway |
| 2026 Milano Cortina | Details | Franjo von Allmen | Switzerland | Ryan Cochran-Siegle | United States | Marco Odermatt | Switzerland |

==== Super-G medals by nation ====
| Rank | NOC | Gold | Silver | Bronze | Total |
|---|---|---|---|---|---|
| 1 | Norway | 5 | 0 | 4 | 9 |
| 2 | Austria | 3 | 4 | 1 | 8 |
| 3 | Switzerland | 1 | 2 | 2 | 5 |
| 4 | France | 1 | 0 | 0 | 1 |
| 4 | Germany | 1 | 0 | 0 | 1 |
| 6 | United States | 0 | 5 | 2 | 7 |
| 7 | Luxembourg | 0 | 1 | 0 | 1 |
| 8 | Canada | 0 | 0 | 1 | 1 |
| 8 | Sweden | 0 | 0 | 1 | 1 |
| Total | 9 nations | 11 | 12 | 11 | 34 |

Note: the German medals are all consolidated in current Germany's NOC.

=== Giant slalom ===
==== Giant slalom podiums ====
| Games | Event | Gold | | Silver | | Bronze | |
| Games | Event | Athlete | NOC | Athlete | NOC | Athlete | NOC |
|---|---|---|---|---|---|---|---|
| 1952 Oslo | Details | Stein Eriksen | Norway | Christian Pravda | Austria | Toni Spiss | Austria |
| 1956 Cortina d'Ampezzo | Details | Toni Sailer | Austria | Anderl Molterer | Austria | Walter Schuster | Austria |
| 1960 Squaw Valley | Details | Roger Staub | Switzerland | Josef Stiegler | Austria | Ernst Hinterseer | Austria |
| 1964 Innsbruck | Details | François Bonlieu | France | Karl Schranz | Austria | Josef Stiegler | Austria |
| 1968 Grenoble | Details | Jean-Claude Killy | France | Willy Favre | Switzerland | Heinrich Messner | Austria |
| 1972 Sapporo | Details | Gustav Thöni | Italy | Edmund Bruggmann | Switzerland | Werner Mattle | Switzerland |
| 1976 Innsbruck | Details | Heini Hemmi | Switzerland | Ernst Good | Switzerland | Ingemar Stenmark | Sweden |
| 1980 Lake Placid | Details | Ingemar Stenmark | Sweden | Andreas Wenzel | Liechtenstein | Hans Enn | Austria |
| 1984 Sarajevo | Details | Max Julen | Switzerland | Jure Franko | Yugoslavia | Andreas Wenzel | Liechtenstein |
| 1988 Calgary | Details | Alberto Tomba | Italy | Hubert Strolz | Austria | Pirmin Zurbriggen | Switzerland |
| 1992 Albertville | Details | Alberto Tomba | Italy | Marc Girardelli | Luxembourg | Kjetil André Aamodt | Norway |
| 1994 Lillehammer | Details | Markus Wasmeier | Germany | Urs Kälin | Switzerland | Christian Mayer | Austria |
| 1998 Nagano | Details | Hermann Maier | Austria | Stephan Eberharter | Austria | Michael von Grünigen | Switzerland |
| 2002 Salt Lake City | Details | Stephan Eberharter | Austria | Bode Miller | United States | Lasse Kjus | Norway |
| 2006 Turin | Details | Benjamin Raich | Austria | Joël Chenal | France | Hermann Maier | Austria |
| 2010 Vancouver | Details | Carlo Janka | Switzerland | Kjetil Jansrud | Norway | Aksel Lund Svindal | Norway |
| 2014 Sochi | Details | Ted Ligety | United States | Steve Missillier | France | Alexis Pinturault | France |
| 2018 Pyeongchang | Details | Marcel Hirscher | Austria | Henrik Kristoffersen | Norway | Alexis Pinturault | France |
| 2022 Beijing | Details | Marco Odermatt | Switzerland | Žan Kranjec | Slovenia | Mathieu Faivre | France |
| 2026 Milano Cortina | Details | Lucas Pinheiro Braathen | Brazil | Marco Odermatt | Switzerland | Loïc Meillard | Switzerland |

==== Giant slalom medals by nation ====
| Rank | NOC | Gold | Silver | Bronze | Total |
| 1 | Austria | 5 | 6 | 8 | 19 |
| 2 | Switzerland | 5 | 5 | 4 | 14 |
| 3 | Italy | 3 | 0 | 0 | 3 |
| 4 | France | 2 | 2 | 3 | 7 |
| 5 | Norway | 1 | 2 | 3 | 6 |
| 6 | United States | 1 | 1 | 0 | 2 |
| 7 | Sweden | 1 | 0 | 1 | 2 |
| 8 | Germany | 1 | 0 | 0 | 1 |
| 8 | Brazil | 1 | 0 | 0 | 1 |
| 10 | Liechtenstein | 0 | 1 | 1 | 2 |
| 11 | Luxembourg | 0 | 1 | 0 | 1 |
| 11 | Slovenia | 0 | 1 | 0 | 1 |
| 11 | Yugoslavia | 0 | 1 | 0 | 1 |
| Total | 13 nations | 20 | 20 | 20 | 60 |

Note: the German medals are all consolidated in current Germany's NOC.

=== Slalom ===
==== Slalom podiums ====
| Games | Event | Gold | | Silver | | Bronze | |
| Games | Event | Athlete | NOC | Athlete | NOC | Athlete | NOC |
|---|---|---|---|---|---|---|---|
| 1948 St. Moritz | Details | Edy Reinalter | Switzerland | James Couttet | France | Henri Oreiller | France |
| 1952 Oslo | Details | Othmar Schneider | Austria | Stein Eriksen | Norway | Guttorm Berge | Norway |
| 1956 Cortina d'Ampezzo | Details | Toni Sailer | Austria | Chiharu Igaya | Japan | Stig Sollander | Sweden |
| 1960 Squaw Valley | Details | Ernst Hinterseer | Austria | Hias Leitner | Austria | Charles Bozon | France |
| 1964 Innsbruck | Details | Josef Stiegler | Austria | Billy Kidd | United States | Jimmy Heuga | United States |
| 1968 Grenoble | Details | Jean-Claude Killy | France | Herbert Huber | Austria | Alfred Matt | Austria |
| 1972 Sapporo | Details | Francisco Fernández Ochoa | Spain | Gustav Thöni | Italy | Roland Thöni | Italy |
| 1976 Innsbruck | Details | Piero Gros | Italy | Gustav Thöni | Italy | Willi Frommelt | Liechtenstein |
| 1980 Lake Placid | Details | Ingemar Stenmark | Sweden | Phil Mahre | United States | Jacques Lüthy | Switzerland |
| 1984 Sarajevo | Details | Phil Mahre | United States | Steve Mahre | United States | Didier Bouvet | France |
| 1988 Calgary | Details | Alberto Tomba | Italy | Frank Wörndl | West Germany | Paul Frommelt | Liechtenstein |
| 1992 Albertville | Details | Finn Christian Jagge | Norway | Alberto Tomba | Italy | Michael Tritscher | Austria |
| 1994 Lillehammer | Details | Thomas Stangassinger | Austria | Alberto Tomba | Italy | Jure Košir | Slovenia |
| 1998 Nagano | Details | Hans Petter Buraas | Norway | Ole Kristian Furuseth | Norway | Thomas Sykora | Austria |
| 2002 Salt Lake City | Details | Jean-Pierre Vidal | France | Sébastien Amiez | France | Benjamin Raich | Austria |
| 2006 Turin | Details | Benjamin Raich | Austria | Reinfried Herbst | Austria | Rainer Schönfelder | Austria |
| 2010 Vancouver | Details | Giuliano Razzoli | Italy | Ivica Kostelić | Croatia | André Myhrer | Sweden |
| 2014 Sochi | Details | Mario Matt | Austria | Marcel Hirscher | Austria | Henrik Kristoffersen | Norway |
| 2018 Pyeongchang | Details | André Myhrer | Sweden | Ramon Zenhäusern | Switzerland | Michael Matt | Austria |
| 2022 Beijing | Details | Clément Noël | France | Johannes Strolz | Austria | Sebastian Foss-Solevåg | Norway |
| 2026 Milano Cortina | Details | Loïc Meillard | Switzerland | Fabio Gstrein | Austria | Henrik Kristoffersen | Norway |

==== Slalom medals by nation ====
| Rank | NOC | Gold | Silver | Bronze | Total |
| 1 | Austria | 7 | 6 | 6 | 19 |
| 2 | Italy | 3 | 4 | 1 | 8 |
| 3 | France | 3 | 2 | 3 | 8 |
| 4 | Norway | 2 | 2 | 4 | 8 |
| 5 | Switzerland | 2 | 1 | 1 | 4 |
| 6 | Sweden | 2 | 0 | 2 | 4 |
| 7 | United States | 1 | 3 | 1 | 5 |
| 8 | Spain | 1 | 0 | 0 | 1 |
| 9 | Croatia | 0 | 1 | 0 | 1 |
| 9 | Japan | 0 | 1 | 0 | 1 |
| 9 | Germany | 0 | 1 | 0 | 1 |
| 12 | Liechtenstein | 0 | 0 | 2 | 2 |
| 13 | Slovenia | 0 | 0 | 1 | 1 |
| Total | 13 nations | 21 | 21 | 21 | 63 |

Note: the German medals are all consolidated in current Germany's NOC.

=== Combined ===
==== Combined podiums ====
| Games | Event | Gold | | Silver | | Bronze | |
| Games | Event | Athlete | NOC | Athlete | NOC | Athlete | NOC |
|---|---|---|---|---|---|---|---|
| 1936 Garmisch-Partenkirchen | Details | Franz Pfnür | Germany | Gustav Lantschner | Germany | Émile Allais | France |
| 1948 St. Moritz | Details | Henri Oreiller | France | Karl Molitor | Switzerland | James Couttet | France |
| 1952 Oslo | Not included in the Olympic program | | | | | | |
| 1956 Cortina d'Ampezzo | Not included in the Olympic program | | | | | | |
| 1960 Squaw Valley | Not included in the Olympic program | | | | | | |
| 1964 Innsbruck | Not included in the Olympic program | | | | | | |
| 1968 Grenoble | Not included in the Olympic program | | | | | | |
| 1972 Sapporo | Not included in the Olympic program | | | | | | |
| 1976 Innsbruck | Not included in the Olympic program | | | | | | |
| 1980 Lake Placid | Not included in the Olympic program | | | | | | |
| 1984 Sarajevo | Not included in the Olympic program | | | | | | |
| 1988 Calgary | Details | Hubert Strolz | Austria | Bernhard Gstrein | Austria | Paul Accola | Switzerland |
| 1992 Albertville | Details | Josef Polig | Italy | Gianfranco Martin | Italy | Steve Locher | Switzerland |
| 1994 Lillehammer | Details | Lasse Kjus | Norway | Kjetil André Aamodt | Norway | Harald Strand Nilsen | Norway |
| 1998 Nagano | Details | Mario Reiter | Austria | Lasse Kjus | Norway | Christian Mayer | Austria |
| 2002 Salt Lake City | Details | Kjetil André Aamodt | Norway | Bode Miller | United States | Benjamin Raich | Austria |
| 2006 Turin | Details | Ted Ligety | United States | Ivica Kostelić | Croatia | Rainer Schönfelder | Austria |
| 2010 Vancouver | Details | Bode Miller | United States | Ivica Kostelić | Croatia | Silvan Zurbriggen | Switzerland |
| 2014 Sochi | Details | Sandro Viletta | Switzerland | Ivica Kostelić | Croatia | Christof Innerhofer | Italy |
| 2018 Pyeongchang | Details | Marcel Hirscher | Austria | Alexis Pinturault | France | Victor Muffat-Jeandet | France |
| 2022 Beijing | Details | Johannes Strolz | Austria | Aleksander Aamodt Kilde | Norway | James Crawford | Canada |
| 2026 Milano Cortina | Not included in the Olympic program | | | | | | |

==== Combined medals by nation ====
| Rank | NOC | Gold | Silver | Bronze | Total |
| 1 | Austria | 4 | 1 | 3 | 8 |
| 2 | Norway | 2 | 3 | 1 | 6 |
| 3 | United States | 2 | 1 | 0 | 3 |
| 4 | France | 1 | 1 | 3 | 5 |
| 4 | Switzerland | 1 | 1 | 3 | 5 |
| 6 | Italy | 1 | 1 | 1 | 3 |
| 7 | Germany | 1 | 1 | 0 | 2 |
| 8 | Croatia | 0 | 3 | 0 | 3 |
| 9 | Canada | 0 | 0 | 1 | 1 |
| Total | 9 nations | 12 | 12 | 12 | 36 |

Note: the German medals are all consolidated in current Germany's NOC.

=== Team Combined ===
==== Team combined podiums ====
| Games | Event | Gold | | Silver | | Bronze | |
| Games | Event | Athlete | NOC | Athlete | NOC | Athlete | Nation |
|---|---|---|---|---|---|---|---|
| 2026 Milano Cortina | Details | Franjo von Allmen; Tanguy Nef | Switzerland | Vincent Kriechmayr; Manuel Feller | Austria | Not awarded | |
| 2026 Milano Cortina | Details | Franjo von Allmen; Tanguy Nef | Switzerland | Marco Odermatt; Loïc Meillard | Switzerland | Not awarded | |

==== Team combined medals by nation ====
| Rank | NOC | Gold | Silver | Bronze | Total |
| 1 | Switzerland | 1 | 1 | 0 | 2 |
| 2 | Austria | 0 | 1 | 0 | 1 |
| Total | 2 nations | 1 | 2 | 0 | 3 |

Note: the German medals are all consolidated in current Germany's NOC.

== Women ==
=== Downhill ===
==== Downhill podiums ====
| Games | Event | Gold | | Silver | | Bronze | |
| Games | Event | Athlete | NOC | Athlete | NOC | Athlete | NOC |
|---|---|---|---|---|---|---|---|
| 1948 St. Moritz | Details | Hedy Schlunegger | Switzerland | Trude Beiser | Austria | Resi Hammerer | Austria |
| 1952 Oslo | Details | Trude Jochum-Beiser | Austria | Mirl Buchner | Germany | Giuliana Minuzzo | Italy |
| 1956 Cortina d'Ampezzo | Details | Madeleine Berthod | Switzerland | Frieda Dänzer | Switzerland | Lucile Wheeler | Canada |
| 1960 Squaw Valley | Details | Heidi Biebl | United Team of Germany | Penelope Pitou | United States | Traudl Hecher | Austria |
| 1964 Innsbruck | Details | Christl Haas | Austria | Edith Zimmermann | Austria | Traudl Hecher | Austria |
| 1968 Grenoble | Details | Olga Pall | Austria | Isabelle Mir | France | Christl Haas | Austria |
| 1972 Sapporo | Details | Marie-Theres Nadig | Switzerland | Annemarie Moser-Pröll | Austria | Susan Corrock | United States |
| 1976 Innsbruck | Details | Rosi Mittermaier | West Germany | Brigitte Totschnig | Austria | Cindy Nelson | United States |
| 1980 Lake Placid | Details | Annemarie Moser-Pröll | Austria | Hanni Wenzel | Liechtenstein | Marie-Theres Nadig | Switzerland |
| 1984 Sarajevo | Details | Michela Figini | Switzerland | Maria Walliser | Switzerland | Olga Charvátová | Czechoslovakia |
| 1988 Calgary | Details | Marina Kiehl | West Germany | Brigitte Oertli | Switzerland | Karen Percy | Canada |
| 1992 Albertville | Details | Kerrin Lee-Gartner | Canada | Hilary Lindh | United States | Veronika Wallinger | Austria |
| 1994 Lillehammer | Details | Katja Seizinger | Germany | Picabo Street | United States | Isolde Kostner | Italy |
| 1998 Nagano | Details | Katja Seizinger | Germany | Pernilla Wiberg | Sweden | Florence Masnada | France |
| 2002 Salt Lake City | Details | Carole Montillet | France | Isolde Kostner | Italy | Renate Götschl | Austria |
| 2006 Turin | Details | Michaela Dorfmeister | Austria | Martina Schild | Switzerland | Anja Pärson | Sweden |
| 2010 Vancouver | Details | Lindsey Vonn | United States | Julia Mancuso | United States | Elisabeth Görgl | Austria |
| 2014 Sochi | Details | Dominique Gisin | Switzerland | None awarded | | Lara Gut | Switzerland |
| 2014 Sochi | Details | Tina Maze | Slovenia | None awarded | | Lara Gut | Switzerland |
| 2018 Pyeongchang | Details | Sofia Goggia | Italy | Ragnhild Mowinckel | Norway | Lindsey Vonn | United States |
| 2022 Beijing | Details | Corinne Suter | Switzerland | Sofia Goggia | Italy | Nadia Delago | Italy |
| 2026 Milano Cortina | Details | Breezy Johnson | United States | Emma Aicher | Germany | Sofia Goggia | Italy |

==== Downhill medals by nation ====
| Rank | NOC | Gold | Silver | Bronze | Total |
|---|---|---|---|---|---|
| 1 | Switzerland | 6 | 4 | 2 | 12 |
| 2 | Austria | 5 | 4 | 7 | 16 |
| 3 | Germany | 5 | 2 | 0 | 7 |
| 4 | United States | 2 | 4 | 3 | 9 |
| 5 | Italy | 1 | 2 | 4 | 7 |
| 6 | France | 1 | 1 | 1 | 3 |
| 7 | Canada | 1 | 0 | 2 | 3 |
| 8 | Slovenia | 1 | 0 | 0 | 1 |
| 9 | Sweden | 0 | 1 | 1 | 2 |
| 10 | Liechtenstein | 0 | 1 | 0 | 1 |
| 10 | Norway | 0 | 1 | 0 | 1 |
| 12 | Czechoslovakia | 0 | 0 | 1 | 1 |
| Total | 12 nations | 22 | 20 | 21 | 63 |

Note: the German medals are all consolidated in current Germany's NOC.

=== Super-G ===
==== Super-G podiums ====
| Games | Event | Gold | | Silver | | Bronze | |
| Games | Event | Athlete | NOC | Athlete | NOC | Athlete | NOC |
|---|---|---|---|---|---|---|---|
| 1988 Calgary | Details | Sigrid Wolf | Austria | Michela Figini | Switzerland | Karen Percy | Canada |
| 1992 Albertville | Details | Deborah Compagnoni | Italy | Carole Merle | France | Katja Seizinger | Germany |
| 1994 Lillehammer | Details | Diann Roffe | United States | Svetlana Gladysheva | Russia | Isolde Kostner | Italy |
| 1998 Nagano | Details | Picabo Street | United States | Michaela Dorfmeister | Austria | Alexandra Meissnitzer | Austria |
| 2002 Salt Lake City | Details | Daniela Ceccarelli | Italy | Janica Kostelić | Croatia | Karen Putzer | Italy |
| 2006 Turin | Details | Michaela Dorfmeister | Austria | Janica Kostelić | Croatia | Alexandra Meissnitzer | Austria |
| 2010 Vancouver | Details | Andrea Fischbacher | Austria | Tina Maze | Slovenia | Lindsey Vonn | United States |
| 2014 Sochi | Details | Anna Fenninger | Austria | Maria Höfl-Riesch | Germany | Nicole Hosp | Austria |
| 2018 Pyeongchang | Details | Ester Ledecká | Czech Republic | Anna Veith | Austria | Tina Weirather | Liechtenstein |
| 2022 Beijing | Details | Lara Gut-Behrami | Switzerland | Mirjam Puchner | Austria | Michelle Gisin | Switzerland |
| 2026 Milano Cortina | Details | Federica Brignone | Italy | Romane Miradoli | France | Cornelia Hütter | Austria |

==== Super-G medals by nation ====
| Rank | NOC | Gold | Silver | Bronze | Total |
| 1 | Austria | 4 | 3 | 4 | 11 |
| 2 | Italy | 3 | 0 | 2 | 5 |
| 3 | United States | 2 | 0 | 1 | 3 |
| 4 | Switzerland | 1 | 1 | 1 | 3 |
| 5 | Czech Republic | 1 | 0 | 0 | 1 |
| 6 | Croatia | 0 | 2 | 0 | 2 |
| 6 | France | 0 | 2 | 0 | 2 |
| 8 | Germany | 0 | 1 | 1 | 2 |
| 9 | Russia | 0 | 1 | 0 | 1 |
| 9 | Slovenia | 0 | 1 | 0 | 1 |
| 11 | Canada | 0 | 0 | 1 | 1 |
| 11 | Liechtenstein | 0 | 0 | 1 | 1 |
| Total | 12 nations | 11 | 11 | 11 | 33 |

Note: the German medals are all consolidated in current Germany's NOC.

=== Giant slalom ===
==== Giant slalom podiums ====
| Games | Event | Gold | | Silver | | Bronze | |
| Games | Event | Athlete | NOC | Athlete | NOC | Athlete | NOC |
|---|---|---|---|---|---|---|---|
| 1952 Oslo | Details | Andrea Mead Lawrence | United States | Dagmar Rom | Austria | Annemarie Buchner | West Germany |
| 1956 Cortina d'Ampezzo | Details | Ossi Reichert | United Team of Germany | Putzi Frandl | Austria | Thea Hochleitner | Austria |
| 1960 Squaw Valley | Details | Yvonne Rüegg | Switzerland | Penelope Pitou | United States | Giuliana Minuzzo | Italy |
| 1964 Innsbruck | Details | Marielle Goitschel | France | Christine Goitschel | France | None awarded | |
| 1964 Innsbruck | Details | Marielle Goitschel | France | Jean Saubert | United States | None awarded | |
| 1968 Grenoble | Details | Nancy Greene | Canada | Annie Famose | France | Fernande Bochatay | Switzerland |
| 1972 Sapporo | Details | Marie-Theres Nadig | Switzerland | Annemarie Moser-Pröll | Austria | Wiltrud Drexel | Austria |
| 1976 Innsbruck | Details | Kathy Kreiner | Canada | Rosi Mittermaier | West Germany | Danièle Debernard | France |
| 1980 Lake Placid | Details | Hanni Wenzel | Liechtenstein | Irene Epple | West Germany | Perrine Pelen | France |
| 1984 Sarajevo | Details | Debbie Armstrong | United States | Christin Cooper | United States | Perrine Pelen | France |
| 1988 Calgary | Details | Vreni Schneider | Switzerland | Christa Kinshofer | West Germany | Maria Walliser | Switzerland |
| 1992 Albertville | Details | Pernilla Wiberg | Sweden | Diann Roffe | United States | None awarded | |
| 1992 Albertville | Details | Pernilla Wiberg | Sweden | Anita Wachter | Austria | None awarded | |
| 1994 Lillehammer | Details | Deborah Compagnoni | Italy | Martina Ertl | Germany | Vreni Schneider | Switzerland |
| 1998 Nagano | Details | Deborah Compagnoni | Italy | Alexandra Meissnitzer | Austria | Katja Seizinger | Germany |
| 2002 Salt Lake City | Details | Janica Kostelić | Croatia | Anja Pärson | Sweden | Sonja Nef | Switzerland |
| 2006 Turin | Details | Julia Mancuso | United States | Tanja Poutiainen | Finland | Anna Ottosson | Sweden |
| 2010 Vancouver | Details | Viktoria Rebensburg | Germany | Tina Maze | Slovenia | Elisabeth Görgl | Austria |
| 2014 Sochi | Details | Tina Maze | Slovenia | Anna Fenninger | Austria | Viktoria Rebensburg | Germany |
| 2018 Pyeongchang | Details | Mikaela Shiffrin | United States | Ragnhild Mowinckel | Norway | Federica Brignone | Italy |
| 2022 Beijing | Details | Sara Hector | Sweden | Federica Brignone | Italy | Lara Gut-Behrami | Switzerland |
| 2026 Milano Cortina | Details | Federica Brignone | Italy | Sara Hector | Sweden | None awarded | |
| 2026 Milano Cortina | Details | Federica Brignone | Italy | Thea Louise Stjernesund | Norway | None awarded | |

==== Giant slalom medals by nation ====
| Rank | NOC | Gold | Silver | Bronze | Total |
| 1 | United States | 4 | 4 | 0 | 8 |
| 2 | Switzerland | 3 | 0 | 5 | 8 |
| 3 | Germany | 2 | 4 | 3 | 9 |
| 4 | Italy | 2 | 1 | 2 | 5 |
| 5 | Sweden | 2 | 1 | 1 | 4 |
| 6 | Canada | 2 | 0 | 0 | 2 |
| 7 | France | 1 | 2 | 3 | 6 |
| 8 | Slovenia | 1 | 1 | 0 | 2 |
| 9 | Croatia | 1 | 0 | 0 | 1 |
| 9 | Liechtenstein | 1 | 0 | 0 | 1 |
| 11 | Austria | 0 | 6 | 3 | 9 |
| 12 | Norway | 0 | 2 | 0 | 2 |
| 13 | Finland | 0 | 1 | 0 | 1 |
| Total | 13 nations | 19 | 21 | 17 | 57 |

Note: the German medals are all consolidated in current Germany's NOC.

=== Slalom ===
==== Slalom podiums ====
| Games | Event | Gold | | Silver | | Bronze | |
| Games | Event | Athlete | NOC | Athlete | NOC | Athlete | NOC |
|---|---|---|---|---|---|---|---|
| 1948 St. Moritz | Details | Gretchen Fraser | United States | Antoinette Meyer | Switzerland | Erika Mahringer | Austria |
| 1952 Oslo | Details | Andrea Mead Lawrence | United States | Ossi Reichert | West Germany | Annemarie Buchner | West Germany |
| 1956 Cortina d'Ampezzo | Details | Renée Colliard | Switzerland | Regina Schöpf | Austria | Yevgeniya Sidorova | Soviet Union |
| 1960 Squaw Valley | Details | Anne Heggtveit | Canada | Betsy Snite | United States | Barbara Henneberger | United Team of Germany |
| 1964 Innsbruck | Details | Christine Goitschel | France | Marielle Goitschel | France | Jean Saubert | United States |
| 1968 Grenoble | Details | Marielle Goitschel | France | Nancy Greene | Canada | Annie Famose | France |
| 1972 Sapporo | Details | Barbara Cochran | United States | Danièle Debernard | France | Florence Steurer | France |
| 1976 Innsbruck | Details | Rosi Mittermaier | West Germany | Claudia Giordani | Italy | Hanni Wenzel | Liechtenstein |
| 1980 Lake Placid | Details | Hanni Wenzel | Liechtenstein | Christa Kinshofer | West Germany | Erika Hess | Switzerland |
| 1984 Sarajevo | Details | Paoletta Magoni | Italy | Perrine Pelen | France | Ursula Konzett | Liechtenstein |
| 1988 Calgary | Details | Vreni Schneider | Switzerland | Mateja Svet | Yugoslavia | Christa Kinshofer | West Germany |
| 1992 Albertville | Details | Petra Kronberger | Austria | Annelise Coberger | New Zealand | Blanca Fernández Ochoa | Spain |
| 1994 Lillehammer | Details | Vreni Schneider | Switzerland | Elfi Eder | Austria | Katja Koren | Slovenia |
| 1998 Nagano | Details | Hilde Gerg | Germany | Deborah Compagnoni | Italy | Zali Steggall | Australia |
| 2002 Salt Lake City | Details | Janica Kostelić | Croatia | Laure Pequegnot | France | Anja Pärson | Sweden |
| 2006 Turin | Details | Anja Pärson | Sweden | Nicole Hosp | Austria | Marlies Schild | Austria |
| 2010 Vancouver | Details | Maria Riesch | Germany | Marlies Schild | Austria | Šárka Záhrobská | Czech Republic |
| 2014 Sochi | Details | Mikaela Shiffrin | United States | Marlies Schild | Austria | Kathrin Zettel | Austria |
| 2018 Pyeongchang | Details | Frida Hansdotter | Sweden | Wendy Holdener | Switzerland | Katharina Gallhuber | Austria |
| 2022 Beijing | Details | Petra Vlhová | Slovakia | Katharina Liensberger | Austria | Wendy Holdener | Switzerland |
| 2026 Milano Cortina | Details | Mikaela Shiffrin | United States | Camille Rast | Switzerland | Anna Swenn-Larsson | Sweden |

==== Slalom medals by nation ====
| Rank | NOC | Gold | Silver | Bronze | Total |
| 1 | United States | 5 | 1 | 1 | 7 |
| 2 | Switzerland | 3 | 3 | 2 | 8 |
| 3 | France | 2 | 4 | 2 | 8 |
| 4 | Germany | 3 | 2 | 3 | 8 |
| 5 | Sweden | 2 | 0 | 2 | 4 |
| 6 | Austria | 1 | 6 | 4 | 11 |
| 7 | Italy | 1 | 2 | 0 | 3 |
| 8 | Canada | 1 | 1 | 0 | 2 |
| 9 | Liechtenstein | 1 | 0 | 2 | 3 |
| 10 | Croatia | 1 | 0 | 0 | 1 |
| 10 | Slovakia | 1 | 0 | 0 | 1 |
| 12 | New Zealand | 0 | 1 | 0 | 1 |
| 12 | Yugoslavia | 0 | 1 | 0 | 1 |
| 14 | Australia | 0 | 0 | 1 | 1 |
| 14 | Czech Republic | 0 | 0 | 1 | 1 |
| 14 | Slovenia | 0 | 0 | 1 | 1 |
| 14 | Soviet Union | 0 | 0 | 1 | 1 |
| 14 | Spain | 0 | 0 | 1 | 1 |
| Total | 18 nations | 21 | 21 | 21 | 63 |

Note: the German medals are all consolidated in current Germany's NOC.

=== Combined ===
==== Combined podiums ====
| Games | Event | Gold | | Silver | | Bronze | |
| Games | Event | Athlete | NOC | Athlete | NOC | Athlete | NOC |
|---|---|---|---|---|---|---|---|
| 1936 Garmisch-Partenkirchen | Details | Christl Cranz | Germany | Käthe Grasegger | Germany | Laila Schou Nilsen | Norway |
| 1948 St. Moritz | Details | Trude Beiser | Austria | Gretchen Fraser | United States | Erika Mahringer | Austria |
| 1952 Oslo | Not included in the Olympic program | | | | | | |
| 1956 Cortina d'Ampezzo | Not included in the Olympic program | | | | | | |
| 1960 Squaw Valley | Not included in the Olympic program | | | | | | |
| 1964 Innsbruck | Not included in the Olympic program | | | | | | |
| 1968 Grenoble | Not included in the Olympic program | | | | | | |
| 1972 Sapporo | Not included in the Olympic program | | | | | | |
| 1976 Innsbruck | Not included in the Olympic program | | | | | | |
| 1980 Lake Placid | Not included in the Olympic program | | | | | | |
| 1984 Sarajevo | Not included in the Olympic program | | | | | | |
| 1988 Calgary | Details | Anita Wachter | Austria | Brigitte Oertli | Switzerland | Maria Walliser | Switzerland |
| 1992 Albertville | Details | Petra Kronberger | Austria | Anita Wachter | Austria | Florence Masnada | France |
| 1994 Lillehammer | Details | Pernilla Wiberg | Sweden | Vreni Schneider | Switzerland | Alenka Dovžan | Slovenia |
| 1998 Nagano | Details | Katja Seizinger | Germany | Martina Ertl | Germany | Hilde Gerg | Germany |
| 2002 Salt Lake City | Details | Janica Kostelić | Croatia | Renate Götschl | Austria | Martina Ertl | Germany |
| 2006 Turin | Details | Janica Kostelić (2) | Croatia | Marlies Schild | Austria | Anja Pärson | Sweden |
| 2010 Vancouver | Details | Maria Riesch | Germany | Julia Mancuso | United States | Anja Pärson | Sweden |
| 2014 Sochi | Details | Maria Höfl-Riesch (2) | Germany | Nicole Hosp | Austria | Julia Mancuso | United States |
| 2018 Pyeongchang | Details | Michelle Gisin | Switzerland | Mikaela Shiffrin | United States | Wendy Holdener | Switzerland |
| 2022 Beijing | Details | Michelle Gisin (2) | Switzerland | Wendy Holdener | Switzerland | Federica Brignone | Italy |
| 2026 | Not included in the Olympic program | | | | | | |

==== Combined medals by nation ====
| Rank | NOC | Gold | Silver | Bronze | Total |
| 1 | Germany | 4 | 2 | 2 | 8 |
| 2 | Austria | 3 | 4 | 1 | 8 |
| 3 | Switzerland | 2 | 3 | 2 | 7 |
| 4 | Croatia | 2 | 0 | 0 | 2 |
| 5 | Sweden | 1 | 0 | 2 | 3 |
| 6 | United States | 0 | 3 | 1 | 4 |
| 7 | France | 0 | 0 | 1 | 1 |
| 7 | Italy | 0 | 0 | 1 | 1 |
| 7 | Norway | 0 | 0 | 1 | 1 |
| 7 | Slovenia | 0 | 0 | 1 | 1 |
| Total | 10 nations | 12 | 12 | 12 | 36 |

Note: the German medals are all consolidated in current Germany's NOC.

=== Team Combined ===
==== Team combined podiums ====
| Games | Event | Gold | | Silver | | Bronze | |
| Games | Event | Athlete | NOC | Athlete | NOC | Athlete | NOC |
|---|---|---|---|---|---|---|---|
| 2026 Milano Cortina | Details | Katharina Huber; Ariane Rädler | Austria | Emma Aicher; Kira Weidle-Winkelmann | Germany | Paula Moltzan; Jacqueline Wiles | United States |

==== Team combined medals by nation ====
| Rank | NOC | Gold | Silver | Bronze | Total |
| 1 | Austria | 1 | 0 | 0 | 1 |
| 2 | Germany | 0 | 1 | 0 | 1 |
| 3 | United States | 0 | 0 | 1 | 1 |
| Total | 3 nations | 1 | 1 | 1 | 3 |

Note: the German medals are all consolidated in current Germany's NOC.

== Mixed, team ==
=== Mixed team podiums ===
| Games | Event | Gold | | Silver | | Bronze | |
| Games | Event | Athlete | NOC | Athlete | NOC | Athlete | NOC |
|---|---|---|---|---|---|---|---|
| 2018 Pyeongchang | Details | Luca Aerni; Denise Feierabend; Wendy Holdener; Daniel Yule; Ramon Zenhäusern | Switzerland | Stephanie Brunner; Manuel Feller; Katharina Gallhuber; Katharina Liensberger; Michael Matt; Marco Schwarz | Austria | Sebastian Foss-Solevåg; Nina Haver-Løseth; Leif Kristian Nestvold-Haugen; Kristin Lysdahl; Jonathan Nordbotten; Maren Skjøld | Norway |
| 2022 Beijing | Details | Katharina Huber; Katharina Liensberger; Katharina Truppe; Stefan Brennsteiner; Michael Matt; Johannes Strolz | Austria | Emma Aicher; Lena Dürr; Julian Rauchfuß; Alexander Schmid; Linus Straßer | Germany | Mina Fürst Holtmann; Thea Louise Stjernesund; Maria Therese Tviberg; Timon Haugan; Fabian Wilkens Solheim; Rasmus Windingstad | Norway |

=== Mixed team medals by nation ===
| Rank | NOC | Gold | Silver | Bronze | Total |
| 1 | Austria | 1 | 1 | 0 | 2 |
| 2 | Switzerland | 1 | 0 | 0 | 1 |
| 3 | Germany | 0 | 1 | 0 | 1 |
| 4 | Norway | 0 | 0 | 2 | 2 |
| Total | 4 nations | 2 | 2 | 2 | 6 |

Note: the German medals are all consolidated in current Germany's NOC.

== Medal ranking by nation ==
| Rank | NOC | Men | | | | Women | | | | Mixed | | | | Totals | | | |
| Rank | NOC | Gold | Silver | Bronze | Sub-total | Gold | Silver | Bronze | Sub-total | Gold | Silver | Bronze | Sub-total | Gold | Silver | Bronze | Total |
|---|---|---|---|---|---|---|---|---|---|---|---|---|---|---|---|---|---|
| 1 | Austria | 22 | 20 | 23 | 65 | 13 | 23 | 19 | 55 | 1 | 1 | 0 | 2 | 36 | 44 | 42 | 122 |
| 2 | Switzerland | 13 | 13 | 12 | 38 | 15 | 11 | 12 | 38 | 1 | 0 | 0 | 1 | 29 | 24 | 24 | 77 |
| 3 | United States | 4 | 9 | 4 | 17 | 13 | 12 | 6 | 31 | 0 | 0 | 0 | 0 | 17 | 21 | 10 | 48 |
| 4 | Germany | 2 | 2 | 1 | 5 | 14 | 11 | 9 | 34 | 0 | 1 | 0 | 1 | 16 | 14 | 10 | 40 |
| 5 | France | 11 | 8 | 8 | 27 | 4 | 9 | 7 | 20 | 0 | 0 | 0 | 0 | 15 | 17 | 15 | 47 |
| 6 | Italy | 7 | 6 | 3 | 16 | 8 | 5 | 9 | 22 | 0 | 0 | 0 | 0 | 15 | 11 | 12 | 38 |
| 7 | Norway | 9 | 9 | 12 | 30 | 0 | 2 | 2 | 4 | 0 | 0 | 2 | 2 | 9 | 12 | 15 | 36 |
| 8 | Sweden | 3 | 0 | 4 | 7 | 5 | 3 | 6 | 14 | 0 | 0 | 0 | 0 | 8 | 3 | 10 | 21 |
| 9 | Croatia | 0 | 1 | 0 | 1 | 4 | 2 | 0 | 6 | 0 | 0 | 0 | 0 | 4 | 3 | 0 | 7 |
| 10 | Canada | 0 | 0 | 3 | 3 | 4 | 1 | 3 | 8 | 0 | 0 | 0 | 0 | 4 | 1 | 6 | 11 |
| 11 | Slovenia | 0 | 1 | 1 | 2 | 2 | 2 | 2 | 6 | 0 | 0 | 0 | 0 | 2 | 3 | 3 | 8 |
| 12 | Liechtenstein | 0 | 1 | 3 | 4 | 2 | 1 | 3 | 6 | 0 | 0 | 0 | 0 | 2 | 2 | 6 | 10 |
| 13 | Czech Republic | 0 | 0 | 0 | 0 | 1 | 0 | 1 | 2 | 0 | 0 | 0 | 0 | 1 | 0 | 1 | 2 |
| 13 | Spain | 1 | 0 | 0 | 1 | 0 | 0 | 1 | 1 | 0 | 0 | 0 | 0 | 1 | 0 | 1 | 2 |
| 15 | Brazil | 1 | 0 | 0 | 1 | 0 | 0 | 0 | 0 | 0 | 0 | 0 | 0 | 1 | 0 | 0 | 1 |
| 15 | Slovakia | 0 | 0 | 0 | 0 | 1 | 0 | 0 | 1 | 0 | 0 | 0 | 0 | 1 | 0 | 0 | 1 |
| 17 | Yugoslavia | 0 | 1 | 0 | 1 | 0 | 1 | 0 | 1 | 0 | 0 | 0 | 0 | 0 | 2 | 0 | 2 |
| 18 | Finland | 0 | 0 | 0 | 0 | 0 | 1 | 0 | 1 | 0 | 0 | 0 | 0 | 0 | 1 | 0 | 1 |
| 18 | New Zealand | 0 | 0 | 0 | 0 | 0 | 1 | 0 | 1 | 0 | 0 | 0 | 0 | 0 | 1 | 0 | 1 |
| 18 | Russia | 0 | 0 | 0 | 0 | 0 | 1 | 0 | 1 | 0 | 0 | 0 | 0 | 0 | 1 | 0 | 1 |
| 18 | Japan | 0 | 1 | 0 | 1 | 0 | 0 | 0 | 0 | 0 | 0 | 0 | 0 | 0 | 1 | 0 | 1 |
| 18 | Luxembourg | 0 | 1 | 0 | 1 | 0 | 0 | 0 | 0 | 0 | 0 | 0 | 0 | 0 | 1 | 0 | 1 |
| 23 | Australia | 0 | 0 | 0 | 0 | 0 | 0 | 1 | 1 | 0 | 0 | 0 | 0 | 0 | 0 | 1 | 1 |
| 23 | Czechoslovakia | 0 | 0 | 0 | 0 | 0 | 0 | 1 | 1 | 0 | 0 | 0 | 0 | 0 | 0 | 1 | 1 |
| 23 | Soviet Union | 0 | 0 | 0 | 0 | 0 | 0 | 1 | 1 | 0 | 0 | 0 | 0 | 0 | 0 | 1 | 1 |

Note: the German medals are all consolidated in current Germany's NOC.

== Medal ranking by alpine skier ==
=== Men ===
| Rank | Athlete | NOC | Olympics | Gold | Silver | Bronze | Total |
|---|---|---|---|---|---|---|---|
| 1 | Kjetil André Aamodt | Norway | 1992–06 | 4 | 2 | 2 | 8 |
| 2 | Alberto Tomba | Italy | 1988-88 | 3 | 2 | 0 | 5 |
| 3 | Matthias Mayer | Austria | 2014-22 | 3 | 0 | 1 | 4 |
| 4 | Jean-Claude Killy | France | 1968 | 3 | 0 | 0 | 3 |
| 4 | Toni Sailer | Austria | 1956 | 3 | 0 | 0 | 3 |
| 4 | Franjo von Allmen | Switzerland | 2026 | 3 | 0 | 0 | 3 |
| 7 | Hermann Maier | Austria | 1998, 2006 | 2 | 1 | 1 | 4 |
| 7 | Aksel Lund Svindal | Norway | 2006–18 | 2 | 1 | 1 | 4 |
| 9 | Marcel Hirscher | Austria | 2014-18 | 2 | 1 | 0 | 3 |
| 9 | Johannes Strolz | Austria | 2022 | 2 | 1 | 0 | 3 |
| 11 | Benjamin Raich | Austria | 2002–14 | 2 | 0 | 2 | 4 |
| 12 | Henri Oreiller | France | 1948 | 2 | 0 | 1 | 3 |
| 12 | Ingemar Stenmark | Sweden | 1976-80 | 2 | 0 | 1 | 3 |
| 14 | Ted Ligety | United States | 2006-14 | 2 | 0 | 0 | 2 |
| 14 | Markus Wasmeier | United Team of Germany | 1994 | 2 | 0 | 0 | 2 |
| 16 | Bode Miller | United States | 1998–2014 | 1 | 3 | 2 | 6 |
| 17 | Lasse Kjus | Norway | 1992–2006 | 1 | 3 | 1 | 5 |
| 18 | Kjetil Jansrud | Norway | 2006–18 | 1 | 2 | 2 | 5 |
| 19 | Stephan Eberharter | Austria | 1992, 1998–2002 | 1 | 2 | 1 | 4 |
| 19 | Marco Odermatt | Switzerland | 2022-26 | 1 | 2 | 1 | 4 |
| 21 | Gustav Thöni | Italy | 1972-76 | 1 | 2 | 0 | 3 |
| 22 | Beat Feuz | Switzerland | 2018-22 | 1 | 1 | 1 | 3 |
| 22 | Michael Matt | Austria | 2018-22 | 1 | 1 | 1 | 3 |
| 22 | Loïc Meillard | Switzerland | 2026 | 1 | 1 | 1 | 3 |
| 22 | Franck Piccard | France | 1988-92 | 1 | 1 | 1 | 3 |
| 22 | Josef Stiegler | Austria | 1960-64 | 1 | 1 | 1 | 3 |
| 27 | Stein Eriksen | Norway | 1952 | 1 | 1 | 0 | 2 |
| 27 | Phil Mahre | United States | 1980-84 | 1 | 1 | 0 | 2 |
| 27 | Tommy Moe | United States | 1994-98 | 1 | 1 | 0 | 2 |
| 27 | Bernhard Russi | Switzerland | 1972-76 | 1 | 1 | 0 | 2 |
| 27 | Othmar Schneider | Austria | 1952 | 1 | 1 | 0 | 2 |
| 27 | Hubert Strolz | Austria | 1988 | 1 | 1 | 0 | 2 |
| 33 | Ernst Hinterseer | Austria | 1960 | 1 | 0 | 1 | 2 |
| 33 | Pirmin Zurbriggen | Switzerland | 1988 | 1 | 0 | 1 | 2 |
| 35 | Luca Aerni | Switzerland | 2018 | 1 | 0 | 0 | 1 |
| 35 | François Bonlieu | France | 1964 | 1 | 0 | 0 | 1 |
| 35 | Lucas Pinheiro Braathen | Brazil | 2026 | 1 | 0 | 0 | 1 |
| 35 | Stefan Brennsteiner | Austria | 2022 | 1 | 0 | 0 | 1 |
| 35 | Hans Petter Buraas | Norway | 1998 | 1 | 0 | 0 | 1 |
| 35 | Zeno Colò | Italy | 1952 | 1 | 0 | 0 | 1 |
| 35 | Jean-Luc Crétier | France | 1998 | 1 | 0 | 0 | 1 |
| 35 | Didier Défago | Switzerland | 2010 | 1 | 0 | 0 | 1 |
| 35 | Antoine Dénériaz | France | 2006 | 1 | 0 | 0 | 1 |
| 35 | Piero Gros | Italy | 1976 | 1 | 0 | 0 | 1 |
| 35 | Heini Hemmi | Switzerland | 1976 | 1 | 0 | 0 | 1 |
| 35 | Finn Christian Jagge | Norway | 1992 | 1 | 0 | 0 | 1 |
| 35 | Carlo Janka | Switzerland | 2010 | 1 | 0 | 0 | 1 |
| 35 | Bill Johnson | United States | 1984 | 1 | 0 | 0 | 1 |
| 35 | Max Julen | Switzerland | 1984 | 1 | 0 | 0 | 1 |
| 35 | Franz Klammer | Austria | 1976 | 1 | 0 | 0 | 1 |
| 35 | Mario Matt | Austria | 2014 | 1 | 0 | 0 | 1 |
| 35 | André Myhrer | Sweden | 2010-18 | 1 | 0 | 1 | 1 |
| 35 | Tanguy Nef | Switzerland | 2026 | 1 | 0 | 0 | 1 |
| 35 | Clément Noël | France | 2022 | 1 | 0 | 0 | 1 |
| 35 | Francisco Fernández Ochoa | Spain | 1972 | 1 | 0 | 0 | 1 |
| 35 | Patrick Ortlieb | Austria | 1992 | 1 | 0 | 0 | 1 |
| 35 | Franz Pfnür | Germany | 1936 | 1 | 0 | 0 | 1 |
| 35 | Josef Polig | Italy | 1992 | 1 | 0 | 0 | 1 |
| 35 | Giuliano Razzoli | Italy | 2010 | 1 | 0 | 0 | 1 |
| 35 | Edy Reinalter | Switzerland | 1948 | 1 | 0 | 0 | 1 |
| 35 | Mario Reiter | Austria | 1998 | 1 | 0 | 0 | 1 |
| 35 | Thomas Stangassinger | Austria | 1994 | 1 | 0 | 0 | 1 |
| 35 | Roger Staub | Switzerland | 1960 | 1 | 0 | 0 | 1 |
| 35 | Leonhard Stock | Austria | 1980 | 1 | 0 | 0 | 1 |
| 35 | Fritz Strobl | Austria | 2002 | 1 | 0 | 0 | 1 |
| 35 | Jean-Pierre Vidal | France | 2002 | 1 | 0 | 0 | 1 |
| 35 | Sandro Viletta | Switzerland | 2014 | 1 | 0 | 0 | 1 |
| 35 | Jean Vuarnet | France | 1960 | 1 | 0 | 0 | 1 |
| 35 | Daniel Yule | Switzerland | 2018 | 1 | 0 | 0 | 1 |
| 35 | Ramon Zenhäusern | Switzerland | 2018 | 1 | 0 | 0 | 1 |
| 35 | Egon Zimmermann | Austria | 1964 | 1 | 0 | 0 | 1 |
| 72 | Ivica Kostelić | Croatia | 2002–14 | 0 | 4 | 0 | 4 |
| 73 | Ryan Cochran-Siegle | United States | 2014-18 | 0 | 2 | 0 | 2 |
| 73 | Manuel Feller | Austria | 2018-26 | 0 | 2 | 0 | 2 |
| 73 | Marc Girardelli | Luxembourg | 1992 | 0 | 2 | 0 | 2 |
| 73 | Peter Müller | Switzerland | 1984-88 | 0 | 2 | 0 | 2 |
| 77 | Henrik Kristoffersen | Norway | 2014-18 | 0 | 1 | 2 | 3 |
| 77 | Alexis Pinturault | France | 2014-18 | 0 | 1 | 2 | 3 |
| 79 | Aleksander Aamodt Kilde | Norway | 2022 | 0 | 1 | 1 | 2 |
| 79 | James Couttet | France | 1948 | 0 | 1 | 1 | 2 |
| 79 | Christof Innerhofer | Italy | 2014 | 0 | 1 | 1 | 2 |
| 79 | Karl Molitor | Switzerland | 1948 | 0 | 1 | 1 | 2 |
| 79 | Anderl Molterer | Austria | 1956 | 0 | 1 | 1 | 2 |
| 79 | Guy Périllat | France | 1960-68 | 0 | 1 | 1 | 2 |
| 79 | Christian Pravda | Austria | 1952 | 0 | 1 | 1 | 2 |
| 79 | Andrew Weibrecht | United States | 2010-14 | 0 | 1 | 1 | 2 |
| 79 | Andreas Wenzel | Liechtenstein | 1980 | 0 | 1 | 1 | 2 |
| 88 | Sébastien Amiez | France | 2002 | 0 | 1 | 0 | 1 |
| 88 | Edmund Bruggmann | Switzerland | 1972 | 0 | 1 | 0 | 1 |
| 88 | Joël Chenal | France | 2006 | 0 | 1 | 0 | 1 |
| 88 | Johan Clarey | France | 2022 | 0 | 1 | 0 | 1 |
| 88 | Roland Collombin | Switzerland | 1972 | 0 | 1 | 0 | 1 |
| 88 | Didier Cuche | Switzerland | 1998 | 0 | 1 | 0 | 1 |
| 88 | Willy Favre | Switzerland | 1968 | 0 | 1 | 0 | 1 |
| 88 | Raymond Fellay | Switzerland | 1956 | 0 | 1 | 0 | 1 |
| 88 | Jure Franko | Yugoslavia | 1984 | 0 | 1 | 0 | 1 |
| 88 | Giovanni Franzoni | Italy | 2026 | 0 | 1 | 0 | 1 |
| 88 | Franz Gabl | Austria | 1948 | 0 | 1 | 0 | 1 |
| 88 | Hans Knauß | Austria | 1998 | 0 | 1 | 0 | 1 |
| 88 | Ole Kristian Furuseth | Norway | 1998 | 0 | 1 | 0 | 1 |
| 88 | Ernst Good | Switzerland | 1976 | 0 | 1 | 0 | 1 |
| 88 | Bernhard Gstrein | Austria | 1988 | 0 | 1 | 0 | 1 |
| 88 | Fabio Gstrein | Austria | 2026 | 0 | 1 | 0 | 1 |
| 88 | Reinfried Herbst | Austria | 2006 | 0 | 1 | 0 | 1 |
| 88 | Herbert Huber | Austria | 1968 | 0 | 1 | 0 | 1 |
| 88 | Chiharu Igaya | Japan | 1956 | 0 | 1 | 0 | 1 |
| 88 | Urs Kälin | Switzerland | 1994 | 0 | 1 | 0 | 1 |
| 88 | Billy Kidd | United States | 1964 | 0 | 1 | 0 | 1 |
| 88 | Žan Kranjec | Slovenia | 2022 | 0 | 1 | 0 | 1 |
| 88 | Vincent Kriechmayr | Austria | 2026 | 0 | 1 | 0 | 1 |
| 88 | Léo Lacroix | France | 1964 | 0 | 1 | 0 | 1 |
| 88 | Hans-Peter Lanig | United Team of Germany | 1960 | 0 | 1 | 0 | 1 |
| 88 | Gustav Lantschner | Germany | 1936 | 0 | 1 | 0 | 1 |
| 88 | Hias Leitner | Austria | 1960 | 0 | 1 | 0 | 1 |
| 88 | Steve Mahre | United States | 1984 | 0 | 1 | 0 | 1 |
| 88 | Gianfranco Martin | Italy | 1992 | 0 | 1 | 0 | 1 |
| 88 | Helmut Mayer | Austria | 1988 | 0 | 1 | 0 | 1 |
| 88 | Steve Missillier | France | 2014 | 0 | 1 | 0 | 1 |
| 88 | Julian Rauchfuß | Germany | 2022 | 0 | 1 | 0 | 1 |
| 88 | Alexander Schmid | Germany | 2022 | 0 | 1 | 0 | 1 |
| 88 | Karl Schranz | Austria | 1964 | 0 | 1 | 0 | 1 |
| 88 | Marco Schwarz | Austria | 2018 | 0 | 1 | 0 | 1 |
| 88 | Linus Straßer | Germany | 2022 | 0 | 1 | 0 | 1 |
| 88 | Michael Walchhofer | Austria | 2006 | 0 | 1 | 0 | 1 |
| 88 | Peter Wirnsberger | Austria | 1980 | 0 | 1 | 0 | 1 |
| 88 | Frank Wörndl | West Germany | 1988 | 0 | 1 | 0 | 1 |
| 88 | Ramon Zenhäusern | Switzerland | 2018 | 0 | 1 | 0 | 1 |
| 128 | Christian Mayer | Austria | 1994.98 | 0 | 0 | 2 | 2 |
| 128 | Heinrich Messner | Austria | 1968-72 | 0 | 0 | 2 | 2 |
| 128 | Rainer Schönfelder | Austria | 2006 | 0 | 0 | 2 | 2 |
| 128 | Sebastian Foss-Solevåg | Norway | 2022 | 0 | 0 | 2 | 2 |
| 132 | Paul Accola | Switzerland | 1988 | 0 | 0 | 1 | 1 |
| 132 | Émile Allais | France | 1936 | 0 | 0 | 1 | 1 |
| 132 | Wolfgang Bartels | United Team of Germany | 1964 | 0 | 0 | 1 | 1 |
| 132 | Guttorm Berge | Norway | 1952 | 0 | 0 | 1 | 1 |
| 132 | Didier Bouvet | France | 1984 | 0 | 0 | 1 | 1 |
| 132 | Charles Bozon | France | 1960 | 0 | 0 | 1 | 1 |
| 132 | James Crawford | Canada | 2022 | 0 | 0 | 1 | 1 |
| 132 | Jean-Daniel Dätwyler | Switzerland | 1968 | 0 | 0 | 1 | 1 |
| 132 | Hans Enn | Austria | 1980 | 0 | 0 | 1 | 1 |
| 132 | Lars-Börje Eriksson | Sweden | 1988 | 0 | 0 | 1 | 1 |
| 132 | Mathieu Faivre | France | 2022 | 0 | 0 | 1 | 1 |
| 132 | Paul Frommelt | Liechtenstein | 1988 | 0 | 0 | 1 | 1 |
| 132 | Willi Frommelt | Liechtenstein | 1976 | 0 | 0 | 1 | 1 |
| 132 | Timon Haugan | Norway | 2022 | 0 | 0 | 1 | 1 |
| 132 | Jimmy Heuga | United States | 1964 | 0 | 0 | 1 | 1 |
| 132 | Ambrosi Hoffmann | Switzerland | 2006 | 0 | 0 | 1 | 1 |
| 132 | Jan Hudec | Canada | 2014 | 0 | 0 | 1 | 1 |
| 132 | Bruno Kernen | Switzerland | 2006 | 0 | 0 | 1 | 1 |
| 132 | Jure Košir | Slovenia | 1994 | 0 | 0 | 1 | 1 |
| 132 | Steve Locher | Switzerland | 1992 | 0 | 0 | 1 | 1 |
| 132 | Jacques Lüthy | Switzerland | 1980 | 0 | 0 | 1 | 1 |
| 132 | Günther Mader | Austria | 1992 | 0 | 0 | 1 | 1 |
| 132 | Alfred Matt | Austria | 1968 | 0 | 0 | 1 | 1 |
| 132 | Werner Mattle | Switzerland | 1972 | 0 | 0 | 1 | 1 |
| 132 | Victor Muffat-Jeandet | France | 2018 | 0 | 0 | 1 | 1 |
| 132 | Leif Kristian Nestvold-Haugen | Norway | 2018 | 0 | 0 | 1 | 1 |
| 132 | Jonathan Nordbotten | Norway | 2018 | 0 | 0 | 1 | 1 |
| 132 | Rolf Olinger | Switzerland | 1948 | 0 | 0 | 1 | 1 |
| 132 | Dominik Paris | Italy | 2026 | 0 | 0 | 1 | 1 |
| 132 | Herbert Plank | Italy | 1976 | 0 | 0 | 1 | 1 |
| 132 | Steve Podborski | Canada | 1980 | 0 | 0 | 1 | 1 |
| 132 | Ed Podivinsky | Canada | 1994 | 0 | 0 | 1 | 1 |
| 132 | Andreas Schifferer | Austria | 2002 | 0 | 0 | 1 | 1 |
| 132 | Walter Schuster | Austria | 1956 | 0 | 0 | 1 | 1 |
| 132 | Stig Sollander | Sweden | 1956 | 0 | 0 | 1 | 1 |
| 132 | Toni Spiss | Austria | 1952 | 0 | 0 | 1 | 1 |
| 132 | Anton Steiner | Austria | 1984 | 0 | 0 | 1 | 1 |
| 132 | Harald Strand Nilsen | Norway | 1994 | 0 | 0 | 1 | 1 |
| 132 | Thomas Sykora | Austria | 1998 | 0 | 0 | 1 | 1 |
| 132 | Roland Thöni | Italy | 1972 | 0 | 0 | 1 | 1 |
| 132 | Jan Einar Thorsen | Norway | 1992 | 0 | 0 | 1 | 1 |
| 132 | Hannes Trinkl | Austria | 1998 | 0 | 0 | 1 | 1 |
| 132 | Michael Tritscher | Austria | 1992 | 0 | 0 | 1 | 1 |
| 132 | Michael von Grünigen | Switzerland | 1998 | 0 | 0 | 1 | 1 |
| 132 | Fabian Wilkens Solheim | Norway | 2022 | 0 | 0 | 1 | 1 |
| 132 | Rasmus Windingstad | Norway | 2022 | 0 | 0 | 1 | 1 |
| 132 | Silvan Zurbriggen | Switzerland | 2010 | 0 | 0 | 1 | 1 |

=== Women ===
| Rank | Athlete | NOC | Olympics | Gold | Silver | Bronze | Total |
|---|---|---|---|---|---|---|---|
| 1 | Janica Kostelić | Croatia | 2002-06 | 4 | 2 | 0 | 6 |
| 2 | Vreni Schneider | Switzerland | 1988-94 | 3 | 1 | 1 | 5 |
| 3 | Deborah Compagnoni | Italy | 1988-94 | 3 | 1 | 0 | 4 |
| 3 | Maria Riesch / Höfl-Riesch | Germany | 2010-14 | 3 | 1 | 0 | 4 |
| 3 | Mikaela Shiffrin | United States | 2014-26 | 3 | 1 | 0 | 4 |
| 6 | Katja Seizinger | Germany | 1994-98 | 3 | 0 | 2 | 5 |
| 7 | Tina Maze | Slovenia | 2010-14 | 2 | 2 | 0 | 4 |
| 8 | Federica Brignone | Italy | 2018-26 | 2 | 1 | 2 | 5 |
| 9 | Hanni Wenzel | Liechtenstein | 1976-80 | 2 | 1 | 1 | 4 |
| 10 | Trude Beiser / Jochum-Beiser | Austria | 1948-52 | 2 | 1 | 0 | 3 |
| 10 | Michaela Dorfmeister | Austria | 1998-2006 | 2 | 1 | 0 | 3 |
| 10 | Marielle Goitschel | France | 1964-68 | 2 | 1 | 0 | 3 |
| 10 | Rosi Mittermaier | West Germany | 1976 | 2 | 1 | 0 | 3 |
| 10 | Pernilla Wiberg | Sweden | 1992-98 | 2 | 1 | 0 | 3 |
| 15 | Michelle Gisin | Switzerland | 2018-22 | 2 | 0 | 1 | 3 |
| 15 | Marie-Theres Nadig | Switzerland | 1972 | 2 | 0 | 1 | 3 |
| 17 | Katharina Huber | Austria | 2022-26 | 2 | 0 | 0 | 2 |
| 17 | Petra Kronberger | Austria | 1992 | 2 | 0 | 0 | 2 |
| 17 | Andrea Mead Lawrence | United States | 1952-56 | 2 | 0 | 0 | 2 |
| 20 | Wendy Holdener | Switzerland | 2018-22 | 1 | 2 | 2 | 5 |
| 21 | Julia Mancuso | United States | 2006-10 | 1 | 2 | 1 | 4 |
| 22 | Katharina Liensberger | Austria | 2022 | 1 | 2 | 0 | 3 |
| 22 | Annemarie Moser-Pröll | Austria | 1972-80 | 1 | 2 | 0 | 3 |
| 22 | Anita Wachter | Austria | 1988-92 | 1 | 2 | 0 | 3 |
| 25 | Anja Pärson | Sweden | 2002-10 | 1 | 1 | 4 | 6 |
| 26 | Sofia Goggia | Italy | 2018-26 | 1 | 1 | 1 | 3 |
| 27 | Anna Fenninger | Austria | 2014 | 1 | 1 | 0 | 2 |
| 27 | Michela Figini | Switzerland | 1984-88 | 1 | 1 | 0 | 2 |
| 27 | Gretchen Fraser | United States | 1948 | 1 | 1 | 0 | 2 |
| 27 | Christine Goitschel | France | 1964 | 1 | 1 | 0 | 2 |
| 27 | Nancy Greene | Canada | 1968 | 1 | 1 | 0 | 2 |
| 27 | Ossi Reichert | United Team of Germany | 1952-56 | 1 | 1 | 0 | 2 |
| 27 | Sara Hector | Sweden | 2022-26 | 1 | 1 | 0 | 2 |
| 27 | Diann Roffe | United States | 1992-94 | 1 | 1 | 0 | 2 |
| 27 | Picabo Street | United States | 1994-98 | 1 | 1 | 0 | 2 |
| 36 | Lara Gut / Gut-Behrami | Switzerland | 2014-22 | 1 | 0 | 2 | 3 |
| 36 | Lindsey Vonn | United States | 2010-26 | 1 | 0 | 2 | 3 |
| 38 | Hilde Gerg | Germany | 1998 | 1 | 0 | 1 | 2 |
| 38 | Christl Haas | Austria | 1964-68 | 1 | 0 | 1 | 2 |
| 38 | Viktoria Rebensburg | Germany | 2010-14 | 1 | 0 | 1 | 2 |
| 41 | Debbie Armstrong | United States | 1984 | 1 | 0 | 0 | 1 |
| 41 | Madeleine Berthod | Switzerland | 1956 | 1 | 0 | 0 | 1 |
| 41 | Heidi Biebl | United Team of Germany | 1960 | 1 | 0 | 0 | 1 |
| 41 | Daniela Ceccarelli | Italy | 2002 | 1 | 0 | 0 | 1 |
| 41 | Barbara Cochran | United States | 1972 | 1 | 0 | 0 | 1 |
| 41 | Renée Colliard | Switzerland | 1956 | 1 | 0 | 0 | 1 |
| 41 | Christl Cranz | Germany | 1936 | 1 | 0 | 0 | 1 |
| 41 | Denise Feierabend | Switzerland | 2018 | 1 | 0 | 0 | 1 |
| 41 | Andrea Fischbacher | Austria | 2010 | 1 | 0 | 0 | 1 |
| 41 | Dominique Gisin | Switzerland | 2014 | 1 | 0 | 0 | 1 |
| 41 | Frida Hansdotter | Sweden | 2018 | 1 | 0 | 0 | 1 |
| 41 | Anne Heggtveit | Canada | 1960 | 1 | 0 | 0 | 0 |
| 41 | Breezy Johnson | United States | 2026 | 1 | 0 | 0 | 1 |
| 41 | Marina Kiehl | West Germany | 1988 | 1 | 0 | 0 | 1 |
| 41 | Kathy Kreiner | Canada | 1976 | 1 | 0 | 0 | 1 |
| 41 | Ester Ledecká | Czech Republic | 2018 | 1 | 0 | 0 | 1 |
| 41 | Kerrin Lee-Gartner | Canada | 1992 | 1 | 0 | 0 | 1 |
| 41 | Paoletta Magoni | Italy | 1984 | 1 | 0 | 0 | 1 |
| 41 | Carole Montillet | France | 2002 | 1 | 0 | 0 | 1 |
| 41 | Olga Pall | Austria | 1968 | 1 | 0 | 0 | 1 |
| 41 | Ariane Rädler | Austria | 2022 | 1 | 0 | 0 | 1 |
| 41 | Yvonne Rüegg | Switzerland | 1960 | 1 | 0 | 0 | 1 |
| 41 | Hedy Schlunegger | Switzerland | 1948 | 1 | 0 | 0 | 1 |
| 41 | Corinne Suter | Switzerland | 2022 | 1 | 0 | 0 | 1 |
| 41 | Katharina Truppe | Austria | 2022 | 1 | 0 | 0 | 1 |
| 41 | Petra Vlhová | Slovakia | 2022 | 1 | 0 | 0 | 1 |
| 41 | Sigrid Wolf | Austria | 1988 | 1 | 0 | 0 | 1 |
| 68 | Marlies Schild | Austria | 2006-10 | 0 | 3 | 1 | 4 |
| 69 | Emma Aicher | Germany | 2022-26 | 0 | 3 | 0 | 3 |
| 70 | Martina Ertl | Germany | 1994-98 | 0 | 2 | 1 | 3 |
| 70 | Nicole Hosp | Austria | 2006-14 | 0 | 2 | 1 | 3 |
| 70 | Christa Kinshofer | West Germany | 1980-88 | 0 | 2 | 1 | 3 |
| 73 | Ragnhild Mowinckel | Norway | 2018 | 0 | 2 | 0 | 2 |
| 73 | Brigitte Oertli | Switzerland | 1988 | 0 | 2 | 0 | 2 |
| 73 | Penelope Pitou | United States | 1960 | 0 | 2 | 0 | 2 |
| 76 | Isolde Kostner | Italy | 1994-2002 | 0 | 1 | 2 | 3 |
| 76 | Alexandra Meissnitzer | Austria | 1998-2006 | 0 | 1 | 2 | 3 |
| 76 | Perrine Pelen | France | 1980-84 | 0 | 1 | 2 | 3 |
| 76 | Maria Walliser | Switzerland | 1984-88 | 0 | 1 | 2 | 3 |
| 80 | Danièle Debernard | France | 1972-76 | 0 | 1 | 1 | 2 |
| 80 | Annie Famose | France | 1968 | 0 | 1 | 1 | 2 |
| 80 | Katharina Gallhuber | Austria | 2018 | 0 | 1 | 1 | 2 |
| 80 | Renate Götschl | Austria | 2002 | 0 | 1 | 1 | 2 |
| 80 | Jean Saubert | United States | 1964 | 0 | 1 | 1 | 2 |
| 85 | Stephanie Brunner | Austria | 2018 | 0 | 1 | 0 | 1 |
| 85 | Mirl Buchner | Germany | 1952 | 0 | 1 | 0 | 1 |
| 85 | Annelise Coberger | New Zealand | 1992 | 0 | 1 | 0 | 1 |
| 85 | Christin Cooper | United States | 1984 | 0 | 1 | 0 | 1 |
| 85 | Frieda Dänzer | Switzerland | 1956 | 0 | 1 | 0 | 1 |
| 85 | Lena Dürr | Germany | 2022 | 0 | 1 | 0 | 1 |
| 85 | Elfi Eder | Austria | 1994 | 0 | 1 | 0 | 1 |
| 85 | Irene Epple | West Germany | 1980 | 0 | 1 | 0 | 1 |
| 85 | Putzi Frandl | Austria | 1967 | 0 | 1 | 0 | 1 |
| 85 | Claudia Giordani | Italy | 1976 | 0 | 1 | 0 | 1 |
| 85 | Svetlana Gladysheva | Russia | 1994 | 0 | 1 | 0 | 1 |
| 85 | Käthe Grasegger | Germany | 1936 | 0 | 1 | 0 | 1 |
| 85 | Hilary Lindh | United States | 1992 | 0 | 1 | 0 | 1 |
| 85 | Carole Merle | France | 1992 | 0 | 1 | 0 | 1 |
| 85 | Antoinette Meyer | Switzerland | 1948 | 0 | 1 | 0 | 1 |
| 85 | Isabelle Mir | France | 1968 | 0 | 1 | 0 | 1 |
| 85 | Romane Miradoli | France | 2026 | 0 | 1 | 0 | 1 |
| 85 | Laure Pequegnot | France | 2002 | 0 | 1 | 0 | 1 |
| 85 | Tanja Poutiainen | Finland | 2006 | 0 | 1 | 0 | 1 |
| 85 | Mirjam Puchner | Austria | 2022 | 0 | 1 | 0 | 1 |
| 85 | Camille Rast | Switzerland | 2026 | 0 | 1 | 0 | 1 |
| 85 | Dagmar Rom | Austria | 1952 | 0 | 1 | 0 | 1 |
| 85 | Martina Schild | Switzerland | 2006 | 0 | 1 | 0 | 1 |
| 85 | Regina Schöpf | Austria | 1956 | 0 | 1 | 0 | 1 |
| 85 | Betsy Snite | United States | 1960 | 0 | 1 | 0 | 1 |
| 85 | Mateja Svet | Yugoslavia | 1988 | 0 | 1 | 0 | 1 |
| 85 | Brigitte Totschnig | Austria | 1976 | 0 | 1 | 0 | 1 |
| 85 | Hanni Wenzel | Liechtenstein | 1980 | 0 | 1 | 0 | 1 |
| 85 | Edith Zimmermann | Austria | 1964 | 0 | 1 | 0 | 1 |
| 85 | Anna Veith | Austria | 2018 | 0 | 1 | 0 | 1 |
| 85 | Kira Weidle-Winkelmann | Germany | 2026 | 0 | 1 | 0 | 1 |
| 116 | Annemarie Buchner | West Germany | 1952 | 0 | 0 | 2 | 2 |
| 116 | Elisabeth Görgl | Austria | 2010 | 0 | 0 | 2 | 2 |
| 116 | Traudl Hecher | Austria | 1960-64 | 0 | 0 | 2 | 2 |
| 116 | Erika Mahringer | Austria | 1948 | 0 | 0 | 2 | 2 |
| 116 | Florence Masnada | France | 1992-98 | 0 | 0 | 2 | 2 |
| 116 | Giuliana Minuzzo | Italy | 1952-60 | 0 | 0 | 2 | 2 |
| 116 | Karen Percy | Canada | 1988 | 0 | 0 | 2 | 2 |
| 116 | Thea Louise Stjernesund | Norway | 2022-26 | 0 | 0 | 2 | 2 |
| 124 | Fernande Bochatay | Switzerland | 1968 | 0 | 0 | 1 | 1 |
| 124 | Olga Charvátová | Czechoslovakia | 1984 | 0 | 0 | 1 | 1 |
| 124 | Susan Corrock | United States | 1972 | 0 | 0 | 1 | 1 |
| 124 | Nadia Delago | Italy | 2022 | 0 | 0 | 1 | 1 |
| 124 | Alenka Dovžan | Slovenia | 1994 | 0 | 0 | 1 | 1 |
| 124 | Wiltrud Drexel | Austria | 1972 | 0 | 0 | 1 | 1 |
| 124 | Blanca Fernández Ochoa | Spain | 1994 | 0 | 0 | 1 | 1 |
| 124 | Mina Fürst Holtmann | Norway | 2022 | 0 | 0 | 1 | 1 |
| 124 | Resi Hammerer | Austria | 1948 | 0 | 0 | 1 | 1 |
| 124 | Nina Haver-Løseth | Norway | 2018 | 0 | 0 | 1 | 1 |
| 124 | Barbara Henneberger | United Team of Germany | 1960 | 0 | 0 | 1 | 1 |
| 124 | Erika Hess | Switzerland | 1980 | 0 | 0 | 1 | 1 |
| 124 | Thea Hochleitner | Austria | 1956 | 0 | 0 | 1 | 1 |
| 124 | Cornelia Hütter | Austria | 2026 | 0 | 0 | 1 | 1 |
| 124 | Ursula Konzett | Liechtenstein | 1984 | 0 | 0 | 1 | 1 |
| 124 | Katja Koren | Slovenia | 1994 | 0 | 0 | 1 | 1 |
| 124 | Kristin Lysdahl | Norway | 2018 | 0 | 0 | 1 | 1 |
| 124 | Paula Moltzan | United States | 2026 | 0 | 0 | 1 | 1 |
| 124 | Sonja Nef | Switzerland | 2002 | 0 | 0 | 1 | 1 |
| 124 | Cindy Nelson | United States | 1976 | 0 | 0 | 1 | 1 |
| 124 | Anna Ottosson | Sweden | 2006 | 0 | 0 | 1 | 1 |
| 124 | Karen Putzer | Italy | 2002 | 0 | 0 | 1 | 1 |
| 124 | Laila Schou Nilsen | Norway | 1936 | 0 | 0 | 1 | 1 |
| 124 | Yevgeniya Sidorova | Soviet Union | 1956 | 0 | 0 | 1 | 1 |
| 124 | Maren Skjøld | Norway | 2018 | 0 | 0 | 1 | 1 |
| 124 | Zali Steggall | Australia | 1998 | 0 | 0 | 1 | 1 |
| 124 | Florence Steurer | France | 1972 | 0 | 0 | 1 | 1 |
| 124 | Anna Swenn-Larsson | Sweden | 2026 | 0 | 0 | 1 | 1 |
| 124 | Maria Therese Tviberg | Norway | 2022 | 0 | 0 | 1 | 1 |
| 124 | Veronika Wallinger | Austria | 1992 | 0 | 0 | 1 | 1 |
| 124 | Tina Weirather | Liechtenstein | 2018 | 0 | 0 | 1 | 1 |
| 124 | Lucile Wheeler | Canada | 1956 | 0 | 0 | 1 | 1 |
| 124 | Jacqueline Wiles | United States | 2026 | 0 | 0 | 1 | 1 |
| 124 | Šárka Záhrobská | Czech Republic | 2010 | 0 | 0 | 1 | 1 |
| 124 | Kathrin Zettel | Austria | 2014 | 0 | 0 | 1 | 1 |

== Notable performances ==
=== Medal sweep events ===
These are events where athletes from one nation won all three medals.

==== Men ====
| Games | Event | NOC | Gold | Silver | Bronze |
|---|---|---|---|---|---|
| 1956 Cortina d'Ampezzo | Giant slalom | Austria | Toni Sailer | Anderl Molterer | Walter Schuster |
| 1994 Lillehammer | Combined | Norway | Lasse Kjus | Kjetil André Aamodt | Harald Christian Strand Nilsen |
| 2006 Turin | Slalom | Austria | Benjamin Raich | Reinfried Herbst | Rainer Schönfelder |

==== Women ====
| Games | Event | NOC | Gold | Silver | Bronze |
|---|---|---|---|---|---|
| 1964 Innsbruck | Downhill | Austria | Christl Haas | Edith Zimmermann | Traudl Hecher |
| 1998 Nagano | Combined | Germany | Katja Seizinger | Martina Ertl | Hilde Gerg |

=== Multiple discipline winners ===
==== Men ====
| Athlete | NOC | Disciplines won | Wins | Categories | | | | | | |
| Athlete | NOC | Disciplines won | Wins | Downhill | Super-G | Giant slalom | Slalom | Combined | Team combined | Mixed team |
|---|---|---|---|---|---|---|---|---|---|---|
| Toni Sailer | Austria | 3 | 3 | 1 | – | 1 | 1 | – | – | – |
| Toni Sailer | Austria | 3 | 3 | 1956 - Cortina d'Ampezzo | – | 1956 - Cortina d'Ampezzo | 1956 - Cortina d'Ampezzo | – | – | – |
| Jean-Claude Killy | France | 3 | 3 | 1 | – | 1 | 1 | – | – | – |
| Jean-Claude Killy | France | 3 | 3 | 1968 - Grenoble | – | 1968 - Grenoble | 1968 - Grenoble | – | – | – |
| Franjo von Allmen | Switzerland | 3 | 3 | 1 | 1 | – | – | – | 1 | – |
| Franjo von Allmen | Switzerland | 3 | 3 | 2026 - Milano; Cortina | 2026 - Milano Cortina | – | – | – | 2026 - Milano; Cortina | – |
| Kjetil André Aamodt | Norway | 2 | 4 | – | 3 | – | – | 1 | – | – |
| Kjetil André Aamodt | Norway | 2 | 4 | – | 1992 - Albertville / 2002 - Salt; Lake City / 2006 - Turin | – | – | 2022- Salt; Lake City | – | – |
| Alberto Tomba | Italy | 2 | 3 | – | – | 2 | 1 | – | – | – |
| Alberto Tomba | Italy | 2 | 3 | – | – | 1988 - Calgary / 1992 - Albertville | 1988 - Calgary | – | – | – |
| Matthias Mayer | Austria | 2 | 3 | 1 | 2 | – | – | – | – | – |
| Matthias Mayer | Austria | 2 | 3 | 2014 - Sochi | 2018 - Pyeongchang / 2022 - Beijing | – | – | – | – | – |
| Hermann Maier | Austria | 2 | 2 | – | 1 | 1 | – | – | – | – |
| Hermann Maier | Austria | 2 | 2 | – | 1998 - Nagano | 1998 - Nagano | – | – | – | – |
| Aksel Lund Svindal | Norway | 2 | 2 | 1 | 1 | – | – | – | – | – |
| Aksel Lund Svindal | Norway | 2 | 2 | 2018 - Pyeongchang | 2010 - Vancouver | – | – | – | – | – |
| Marcel Hirscher | Austria | 2 | 2 | – | – | 1 | – | 1 | – | – |
| Marcel Hirscher | Austria | 2 | 2 | – | – | 2018 - Pyeongchang | – | 2018 - Pyeongchang | – | – |
| Johannes Strolz | Austria | 2 | 2 | – | – | – | – | 1 | – | 1 |
| Johannes Strolz | Austria | 2 | 2 | – | – | – | – | 2022 - Beijing | – | 2022 - Beijing |
| Benjamin Raich | Austria | 2 | 2 | – | – | 1 | 1 | – | – | – |
| Benjamin Raich | Austria | 2 | 2 | – | – | 2006 - Turin | 2006 - Turin | – | – | – |
| Henri Oreiller | France | 2 | 2 | 1 | – | – | – | 1 | – | – |
| Henri Oreiller | France | 2 | 2 | 1948 St. Moritz | – | – | – | 1948 St. Moritz | – | – |
| Ingemar Stenmark | Sweden | 2 | 2 | – | – | 1 | 1 | – | – | – |
| Ingemar Stenmark | Sweden | 2 | 2 | – | – | 1980 - Lake Placid | 1980 - Lake Placid | – | – | – |
| Ted Ligety | United States | 2 | 2 | – | – | 1 | – | 1 | – | – |
| Ted Ligety | United States | 2 | 2 | – | – | 2014 - Sochi | – | 2006 Turin | – | – |
| Markus Wasmeier | United Team of Germany | 2 | 2 | – | 1 | 1 | – | – | – | – |
| Markus Wasmeier | United Team of Germany | 2 | 2 | – | 1994 - Lillehammer | 1994 - Lillehammer | – | – | – | – |

==== Women ====
| Athlete | NOC | Disciplines won | Wins | Categories | | | | | | |
| Athlete | NOC | Disciplines won | Wins | Downhill | Super-G | Giant slalom | Slalom | Combined | Team combined | Mixed team |
|---|---|---|---|---|---|---|---|---|---|---|
| Janica Kostelić | Croatia | 3 | 4 | – | – | 1 | 1 | 2 | – | – |
| Janica Kostelić | Croatia | 3 | 4 | – | – | 1956 - Cortina d'Ampezzo | 1956 - Cortina d'Ampezzo | 2002 - Salt Lake City / 2006 - Torino | – | – |
| Vreni Schneider | Switzerland | 2 | 3 | – | – | 1 | 2 | – | – | – |
| Vreni Schneider | Switzerland | 2 | 3 | – | – | 1988 - Calgary | 1988 - Calgary / 1994 - Lillehammer | – | – | – |
| Deborah Compagnoni | Italy | 2 | 3 | – | 1 | 2 | – | – | – | – |
| Deborah Compagnoni | Italy | 2 | 3 | – | 1992 - Albertville | 1994 - Lillehammer / 1998 - Nagano | – | – | – | – |
| Maria Riesch / Höfl-Riesch | Germany | 2 | 3 | – | – | – | 1 | 2 | – | – |
| Maria Riesch / Höfl-Riesch | Germany | 2 | 3 | – | – | – | 2010 - Vancouver | 2010 - Vancouver | – | – |
| Katja Seizinger | Germany | 2 | 3 | 2 | – | – | – | 1 | – | – |
| Katja Seizinger | Germany | 2 | 3 | 1994 - Lillehammer / 1998 - Nagano | – | – | – | 1998 - Nagano | – | – |
| Mikaela Shiffrin | United States | 2 | 3 | – | – | 1 | 2 | – | – | – |
| Mikaela Shiffrin | United States | 2 | 3 | – | – | 2018 - Pyeongchang | 2014 - Sochi / 2026 - Milano Cortina | – | – | – |
| Tina Maze | Slovenia | 2 | 2 | 1 | – | 1 | – | – | – | – |
| Tina Maze | Slovenia | 2 | 2 | 2014 - Sochi | – | 2014 - Sochi | – | – | – | – |
| Federica Brignone | Italy | 2 | 2 | – | 1 | 1 | – | – | – | – |
| Federica Brignone | Italy | 2 | 2 | – | 2026 - Milano Cortina | 2026 - Milano Cortina | – | – | – | – |
| Hanni Wenzel | Liechtenstein | 2 | 2 | – | – | 1 | 1 | – | – | – |
| Hanni Wenzel | Liechtenstein | 2 | 2 | – | – | 1980 - Lake Placid | 1980 - Lake Placid | – | – | – |
| Trude Jochum-Beiser | Austria | 2 | 2 | 1 | – | – | – | 1 | – | – |
| Trude Jochum-Beiser | Austria | 2 | 2 | 1952 - Oslo | – | – | – | 1948 - St. Moritz | – | – |
| Michaela Dorfmeister | Switzerland | 2 | 2 | 1 | 1 | – | – | – | – | – |
| Michaela Dorfmeister | Switzerland | 2 | 2 | 2006 - Turin | 2006 - Turin | – | – | – | – | – |
| Marielle Goitschel | France | 2 | 2 | – | – | 1 | 1 | – | – | – |
| Marielle Goitschel | France | 2 | 2 | – | – | 1964 - Innsbruck | 1968 - Grenoble | – | – | – |
| Rosi Mittermaier | West Germany | 2 | 2 | 1 | – | – | 1 | – | – | – |
| Rosi Mittermaier | West Germany | 2 | 2 | 1976 - Innsbruck | – | – | 1976 - Innsbruck | – | – | – |
| Pernilla Wiberg | Sweden | 2 | 2 | – | – | 1 | – | 1 | – | – |
| Pernilla Wiberg | Sweden | 2 | 2 | – | – | 1992 - Albertville | – | 1994 - Lillehammer | – | – |
| Marie-Theres Nadig | Switzerland | 2 | 2 | 1 | – | 1 | – | – | – | – |
| Marie-Theres Nadig | Switzerland | 2 | 2 | 1972 - Sapporo | – | 1972 - Sapporo | – | – | – | – |
| Katharina Huber | Austria | 2 | 2 | – | – | – | – | – | 1 | 1 |
| Katharina Huber | Austria | 2 | 2 | – | – | – | – | – | 2026 - Milano Cortina | 2022 - Beijing |
| Petra Kronberger | Austria | 2 | 2 | – | – | – | 1 | 1 | – | – |
| Petra Kronberger | Austria | 2 | 2 | – | – | – | 1992 - Albertville | 1992 - Albertville | – | – |
| Andrea Mead Lawrence | United States | 2 | 2 | – | – | 1 | 1 | – | – | – |
| Andrea Mead Lawrence | United States | 2 | 2 | – | – | 1952 - Oslo | 1952 - Oslo | – | – | – |

== See also ==
- List of Paralympic medalists in alpine skiing
- List of alpine skiing world champions
- Lists of Olympic medalists
