= Alpine skiing at the 1948 Winter Olympics – Women's combined =

The women's alpine skiing combined event was part of the alpine skiing at the 1948 Winter Olympics programme. It was the second appearance of the event. The competition consisted of a downhill race held on Monday, February 2, 1948, and two slalom heats held on Wednesday, February 4, 1948. Twenty-eight alpine skiers from ten nations competed.

== Medalists ==
Gold	Silver	Bronze
Trude Beiser; Austria	Gretchen Fraser; United States	Erika Mahringer; Austria

== Results ==
=== Downhill ===
The downhill race was held on Monday, February 2, 1948. It was part of the special downhill event. Twenty-eight of the 37 women who competed in the downhill race also started in the first slalom heat of the combined event.

=== Slalom ===
The slalom race was held on Wednesday, February 4, 1948, and started at 10:00 a.m.

Place	Downhill	Competitor	1st run	2nd run	Time	Difference	Points
1	15	Erika Mahringer (AUT)	58.4	59.7	118.1		0.00
2	11	Gretchen Fraser (USA)	61.8	59.2	121.0	+2.9	1.45
3	13	Anneliese Schuh-Proxauf (AUT)	62.1	62.2	124.3	+6.2	3.10
4	12	Alexandra Nekvapilová (TCH)	65.9	62.9	128.8	+10.7	5.35
5	7	Françoise Gignoux (FRA)	63.8	65.2	129.0	+10.9	5.45
6	9	Rosemarie Bleuer (SUI)	65.5	63.8	129.3	+11.2	5.60
7	4	Celina Seghi (ITA)	68.2	61.5	129.7	+11.6	5.80
8	2	Trude Beiser (AUT)	61.8	68.7	130.5	+12.4	6.20
9	14	May Nilsson (SWE)	65.3	65.3	130.6	+12.5	6.25
10	10	Lucienne Schmidt-Couttet (FRA)	64.0	68.4	132.4	+14.3	7.15
11	27	Andrea Mead (USA)	63.8	71.7	135.5	+17.4	8.70
12	16	Ruth-Marie Stewart (USA)	69.8	66.6	136.4	+18.3	9.15
13	7	Laila Schou Nilsen (NOR)	71.0	66.0	137.0	+18.9	9.45
13	6	Suzanne Thiollière (FRA)	75.0*	62.0	137.0	+18.9	9.45
15	1	Hedy Schlunegger (SUI)	71.4	67.1	138.5	+20.4	10.20
16	23	Georgette Miller-Thiollière (FRA)	63.9	74.8*	138.7	+20.6	10.30
17	5	Lina Mittner (SUI)	63.3	76.3	139.6	+21.5	10.75
18	3	Resi Hammerer (AUT)	68.9	70.9	139.8	+21.7	10.85
19	20	Božena Moserová (TCH)	74.6	67.0	141.6	+23.5	11.75
20	17	Rebecca Cremer (USA)	69.4	72.5	141.9	+23.8	11.90
21	18	Borghild Niskin (NOR)	74.1	72.0	146.1	+29.0	14.00
21	24	Renata Carraretto (ITA)	72.6	73.5	146.1	+29.0	14.00
23	25	Sheena Mackintosh (GBR)	70.9	79.0	149.9	+32.8	15.90
24	22	Rosemarie Sparrow (GBR)	82.0	79.7	161.7	+44.6	21.80
25	21	Isobel Roe (GBR)	88.1	75.5	163.6	+46.5	22.75
26	26	Xanthe Ryder (GBR)	85.0	84.8	169.8	+52.7	25.85
27	18	Olivia Ausoni (SUI)	104.4	68.5	172.9	+55.8	27.40
–	28	Anikó Iglói (HUN)	DNF				DNF

* 5 seconds penalty included.

=== Final standings ===
The winner of the downhill Hedy Schlunegger finished only 15th in the slalom, while Erika Mahringer, after finishing 15th in the downhill, won the slalom part of the combined event. Overall Mahringer won the bronze medal, but Schlunegger only finished eighth. Trude Beiser won the gold medal with an eighth place in slalom after finishing second in the downhill. Gretchen Fraser came up from eleventh place after the downhill to win the silver medal when finishing second in the slalom.

Place	Competitor	Downhill points	Slalom points	Total
1	Trude Beiser (AUT)	0.38	6.20	6.58
2	Gretchen Fraser (USA)	5.50	1.45	6.95
3	Erika Mahringer (AUT)	7.04	0.00	7.04
4	Celina Seghi (ITA)	1.66	5.80	7.46
5	Françoise Gignoux (FRA)	2.69	5.45	8.14
6	Rosemarie Bleuer (SUI)	3.20	5.60	8.80
7	Anneliese Schuh-Proxauf (AUT)	6.66	3.10	9.76
8	Hedy Schlunegger (SUI)	0.00	10.20	10.20
9	Alexandra Nekvapilová (TCH)	5.63	5.35	10.98
10	Lucienne Schmidt-Couttet (FRA)	4.35	7.15	11.50
10	Suzanne Thiollière (FRA)	2.05	9.45	11.50
12	Resi Hammerer (AUT)	1.02	10.85	11.87
13	Laila Schou Nilsen (NOR)	2.69	9.45	12.14
14	Lina Mittner (SUI)	1.79	10.75	12.54
15	May Nilsson (SWE)	6.78	6.25	13.03
16	Ruth-Marie Stewart (USA)	8.58	9.15	17.73
17	Rebecca Cremer (USA)	10.11	11.90	22.01
18	Božena Moserová (TCH)	11.26	11.75	23.01
19	Borghild Niskin (NOR)	10.37	14.00	24.37
20	Georgette Miller-Thiollière (FRA)	15.49	10.30	25.79
21	Andrea Mead (USA)	22.14	8.70	30.84
22	Renata Carraretto (ITA)	19.58	14.00	33.58
23	Isobel Roe (GBR)	12.16	22.75	34.91
24	Sheena Mackintosh (GBR)	20.10	15.90	36.00
25	Rosemarie Sparrow (GBR)	15.36	21.80	37.16
26	Olivia Ausoni (SUI)	10.62	27.40	38.02
27	Xanthe Ryder (GBR)	21.25	22.85	47.10
–	Anikó Iglói (HUN)	24.34	DNF	DNF
