= Alpine skiing at the 1948 Winter Olympics – Women's slalom =

The women's alpine skiing slalom event was part of the alpine skiing at the 1948 Winter Olympics programme. It was the first appearance of the event. The competition was held on Thursday, February 5, 1948. Twenty-eight alpine skiers from ten nations competed.

== Medalists ==
Gold	Silver	Bronze
Gretchen Fraser; United States	Antoinette Meyer; Switzerland	Erika Mahringer; Austria

== Results ==
Place	Alpine skier	1st run	2nd run	Total	Difference
1	Gretchen Fraser (USA)	59.7	57.5	117.2	
2	Antoinette Meyer (SUI)	60.7	57.0	117.7	+0.5
3	Erika Mahringer (AUT)	59.8	58.2	118.0	+0.8
4	Georgette Miller-Thiollière (FRA)	60.8	58.0	118.8	+1.6
5	Renée Clerc (SUI)	63.8	62.0	125.8	+8.6
6	Anneliese Schuh-Proxauf (AUT)	66.9	59.8	126.7	+9.5
7	Resi Hammerer (AUT)	64.4	64.2	128.6	+11.4
8	Andrea Mead (USA)	65.1	63.7	128.8	+11.6
9	Brynhild Grasmoen (USA)	65.6	64.0	129.6	+12.4
10	May Nilsson (SWE)	72.2	57.5	129.7	+12.5
11	Paula Kann (USA)	67.8	62.0	129.8	+12.6
12	Françoise Gignoux (FRA)	65.0	65.3	130.3	+13.1
13	Rosemarie Bleuer (SUI)	66.2	64.4	130.6	+13.4
14	Laila Schou Nilsen (NOR)	66.8	64.7	131.5	+14.3
14	Celina Seghi (ITA)	73.2	58.3	131.5	+14.3
16	Alexandra Nekvapilová (TCH)	63.2	68.8	132.0	+14.8
17	Olivia Ausoni (SUI)	78.7	59.9	138.6	+21.4
18	Renata Carraretto (ITA)	69.2	70.7	139.9	+22.7
19	Božena Moserová (TCH)	72.5	67.6	140.1	+22.9
20	Lucienne Schmidt-Couttet (FRA)	60.1	75.5*	140.6	+23.4
21	Sheena Mackintosh (GBR)	70.5	75.4*	150.9	+33.7
22	Anikó Iglói (HUN)	90.2	87.7	168.9	+51.7
23	Isobel Roe (GBR)	84.5	85.1	169.6	+52.4
24	Bridget Duke-Wooley (GBR)	94.7	79.0	173.7	+57.5
—	Suzanne Thiollière (FRA)			DNF	
—	Bunty Greenland (GBR)			DNF	
—	Borghild Niskin (NOR)			DSQ	
—	Annelore Zückert (AUT)			DSQ	

* 5 seconds penalty added.
