= Bridget Duke-Wooley =

British alpine skier (1915–1976)

Personal information
- Nationality: British
- Born: 12 February 1915; Runcorn, England
- Died: 6 April 1976 (aged 61); Sway, Hampshire, England

Sport
- Sport: Alpine skiing

Bridget Duke-Wooley (12 February 1915 – 6 April 1976) was a British alpine skier. She competed in the women's slalom at the 1948 Winter Olympics.
