= Celina Seghi =

Italian alpine skier (1920–2022)

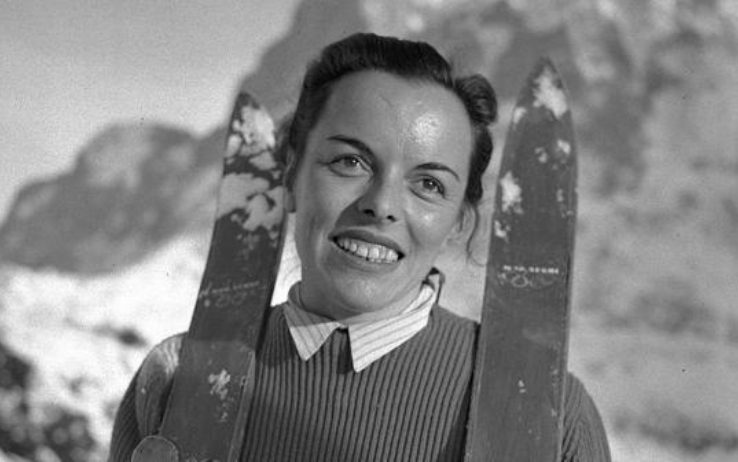

Personal information
- Born: 6 March 1920 Abetone, Tuscany, Italy
- Died: 27 July 2022 (aged 102) Pistoia, Tuscany, Italy

Skiing career
- Sport: Alpine skiing
- Disciplines: Downhill, giant slalom, slalom, combined

Olympics
- Teams: 2 – (1948, 1952)
Medal record
FIS Alpine World Ski Championships
Bronze medal – third place	1950 Aspen	Women's slalom

Celina Seghi (6 March 1920 – 27 July 2022) (Note: Most sources list her date of birth as 8 March but this is a transcription error in the original records) was an Italian alpine skier. Born in Abetone, Tuscany, she was the youngest child in a family of nine and earned her first Italian championship medal, a bronze in the slalom, in 1934.

== Biography ==
In 1937 Seghi earned three national titles, her first victories at that level, by winning the slalom, downhill, and combined events. In total she won a total of 25 gold, 6 silver, and 3 bronze medals at the Italian National Championships: gold seven times, silver thrice, and bronze twice in the downhill, gold and silver once each in the giant slalom, gold ten times, silver twice, and bronze once in the slalom, and gold seven times in the combined.

On the international level Seghi won gold in the slalom and silver in the combined event at the 1941 FIS Alpine World Ski Championships, but the results of the tournament were nullified by the International Ski Federation due to the limited participation from only German-friendly nations. She resumed skiing after World War II and next appeared at the 1948 Winter Olympics, where she finished fourth in both the women's downhill and combined, and joint-fourteenth (with Laila Schou Nilsen) in the slalom. In 1950 she captured her only recognized World Championship medal, bronze in the women's slalom, and two years later participated in the 1952 Winter Olympics, finishing fourth in the women's slalom, seventh in the giant slalom, and joint-fifteenth (with Silvia Glatthard) in the downhill. She retired from active competition in 1956, shortly before the 1956 Winter Olympics, married a surgeon in 1970, and moved to Pistoia, where she continued to ski into her 90s. She turned 100 in March 2020 and died on 27 July 2022 at the age of 102 in Pistoia.
