= Trude Beiser =

Austrian alpine skier (born 1927)

- Beiser in 1948

Personal information
- Born: 2 September 1927 (age 99) Lech am Arlberg, Vorarlberg, Austria

Skiing career
- Sport: Alpine skiing
- Disciplines: Downhill, giant slalom, slalom, combined

Olympics
- Teams: 2 – (1948, 1952)
- Medals: 3 (2 gold)

World Championships
- Teams: 3 – (1948, 1950, 1952) includes two Olympics
- Medals: 5 (3 gold)
Medal record
Women's alpine skiing
Representing Austria
Olympic Games
Gold medal – first place	1948 St. Moritz	Combined
Gold medal – first place	1952 Oslo	Downhill
Silver medal – second place	1948 St. Moritz	Downhill
World Championships
Gold medal – first place	1950 Aspen	Downhill
Silver medal – second place	1950 Aspen	Giant slalom

Trude Beiser (after her marriage Trude Jochum-Beiser; born 2 September 1927) is a former alpine ski racer from Austria. Born in Lech am Arlberg in Vorarlberg, she won two Olympic gold medals and a world championship. Beiser was the first female Austrian skier to win two Olympic gold medals at two Olympic Winter Games.

== Competitive career ==
Beiser's racing career consisted of five total competitions, two in the 1950 FIS World Ski Championships and three in the Winter Olympics of 1948 and 1952 (which also counted as FIS competitions, thus, her scoreboard holds eight total competitions). In the 1948 Winter Olympics, Beiser won the gold medal for the combined and the silver medal for the downhill competitions. She then won two medals at the 1950 World Championships in Aspen, Colorado: a gold in downhill and a silver in the giant slalom. In 1952, she won the gold medal in downhill racing, securing the rank of champion for a second time.

== Biography ==
Beiser married Alfred Jochum after the 1948 Olympics. Four months earlier (in regard to the World Championships), she had given birth to her first child. Once she competed in the 1952 Olympics, her country named her the Austrian sportswoman of the year. After her racing career, Beiser worked as skiing trainer and opened a café (named "Café Olympia") in her home town.

== Honors and Accomplishments ==
In 1996, The Republic of Austria awarded Beiser with a Medal of Merit in Gold. 4 years later, she became an Honorary Freewoman of the community of Lech and an Honorary Member of the Arlberg Ski Club.

Awards
Preceded by (Austria) Erika Mahringer	Austrian Sportswoman of the Year; 1952	Succeeded by (Austria) Trude Klecker
