= Bunty Greenland =

British alpine skier (1912–1998)

Personal information
- Full name: Margaret Mary Greenland
- Nationality: British
- Born: 21 December 1912
- Died: 26 August 1998 (aged 85)

Sport
- Sport: Alpine skiing

Margaret Mary "Bunty" Greenland (21 December 1912 – 26 August 1998) was a British alpine skier. She competed in the women's slalom at the 1948 Winter Olympics.
