= David Lawrence (skier) =

American alpine skier (1930–2003)

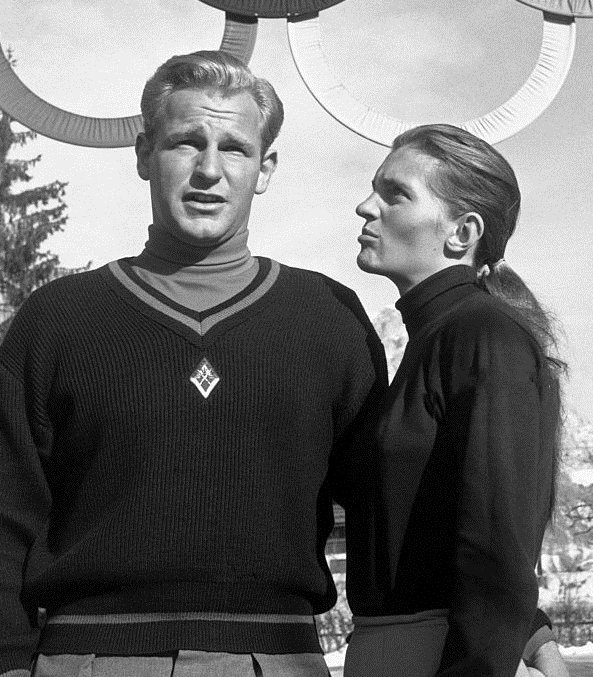
- David and Andrea Lawrence at the 1956 Winter Olympics

Personal information
- Born: April 15, 1930 Neuilly-sur-Seine, France
- Died: September 20, 2003 (aged 73)

Sport
- Sport: Alpine skiing
- Club: Southern Ski Club

David Judah Lawrence (April 15, 1930 – September 20, 2003) was an American alpine ski racer. He competed in the giant slalom at the 1952 Winter Olympics and finished 35th.

Born in 1930 into a French Jewish family, Lawrence received his education from private teachers, and every winter he went to ski at Davos, Switzerland. With the invasion of France by the Nazis in 1940, the Lawrence family sought refuge in Portugal after receiving visas from the Portuguese consul Aristides de Sousa Mendes, on June 15 and 21, 1940. David’s father Ludovic stayed in Estoril, at the Hotel Palácio, between June 22 and July 1, 1940; and then joined his son and wife Johanna when they arrived in Monte Estoril, where they stayed at the Grande Hotel, between July 1 and 15, 1940. On the same day that they checked out, they boarded the Pan Am Yankee Clipper headed for New York City, arriving on July 20, 1940.

In 1948, he enrolled to Dartmouth College in Hanover, New Hampshire, and graduated in 1951. That year, he married fellow American alpine ski racer Andrea Mead; they both competed at the 1952 Olympics, where she won two gold medals, in the giant slalom and slalom.

Lawrence then managed the Pico Peak ski area in Vermont, which was owned by his mother-in-law. In 1954, the couple moved to Parshall, Colorado, where he coached alpine skiing until 1957. Between 1952 and 1956, Andrea gave birth to a girl and two boys, with two girls born some time later. From 1957 to 1960, Lawrence worked for his father's company in Switzerland, and in 1960–1964 was an architectural designer in Aspen, Colorado; he also prepared the U.S. women's alpine team for the 1960 Winter Olympics at Squaw Valley, California.

After fourteen years of marriage, the couple divorced in 1965 and all five children remained with Andrea. Lawrence remarried and settled in Mexico in 1968.
