= Antoinette Meyer =

Swiss alpine skier (1920–2010)

Olympic medal record

Women's Alpine skiing
Silver medal – second place	1948 St. Moritz	Slalom

Antoinette Meyer (later Molitor; 19 June 1920 – 19 July 2010) was a Swiss alpine skier who competed in the 1948 Winter Olympics. She was born in Hospental and was married with Karl Molitor. In 1948 she won the silver medal in the slalom event. In the downhill competition she finished eleventh.
