= Gretchen Fraser =

American alpine skier

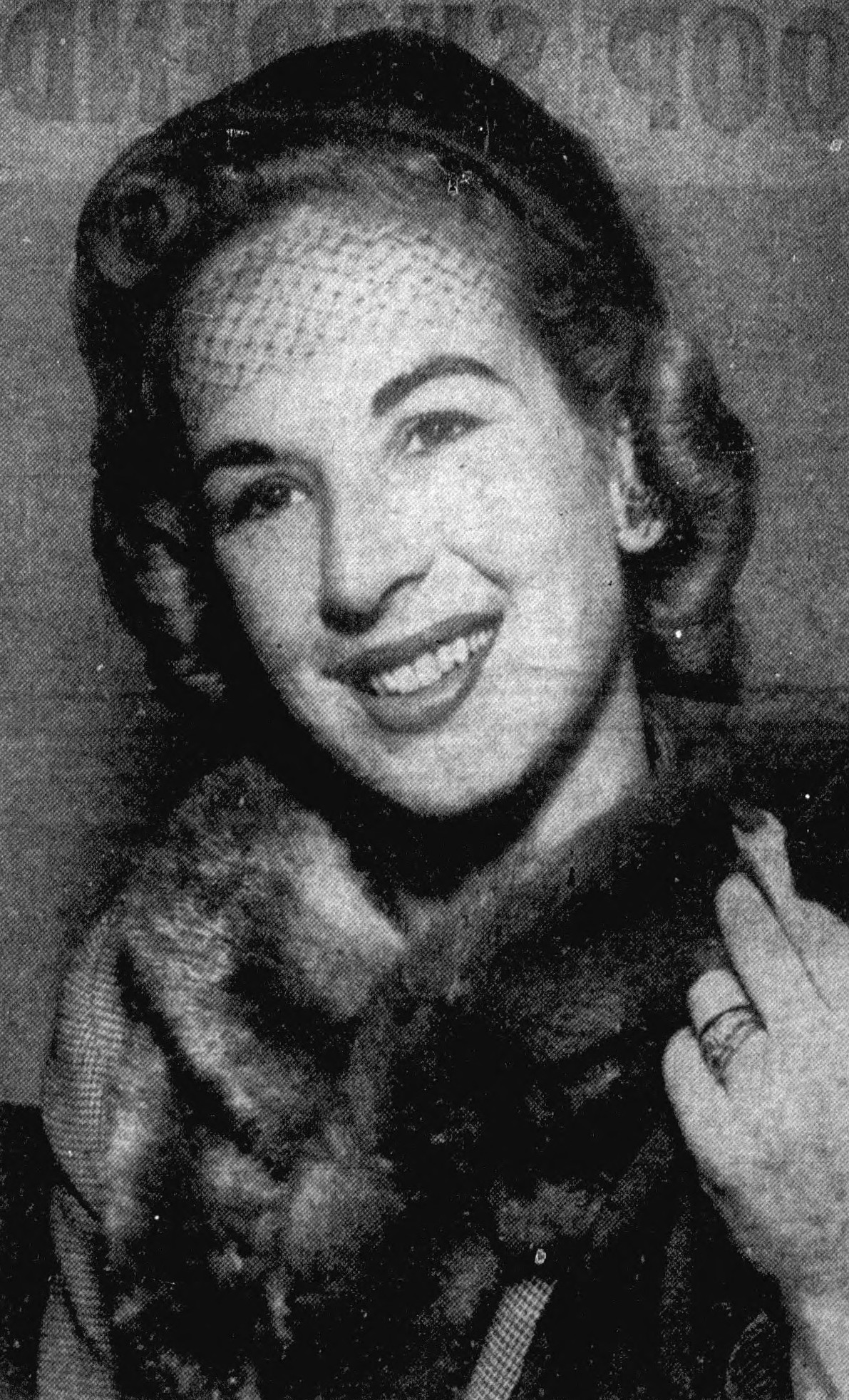
- Fraser, circa 1951

Personal information
- Born: Gretchen Kunigk; February 11, 1919 Tacoma, Washington, US
- Died: February 17, 1994 (aged 75) Sun Valley, Idaho, US
- Height: 5 ft 4 in (163 cm)
- Weight: 117 lb (53 kg)

Sport
- Country: United States
- Sport: Alpine skiing
- Event: Slalom
- College team: University of Puget Sound
- Team: Ski Team
- Retired: 1948 (age 29)

Achievements and titles
- World finals: Olympic gold medal, Olympic silver medal
Medal record
Women's alpine skiing
Representing the United States
Olympic Games
Gold medal – first place	1948 St. Moritz	Slalom
Silver medal – second place	1948 St. Moritz	Combined

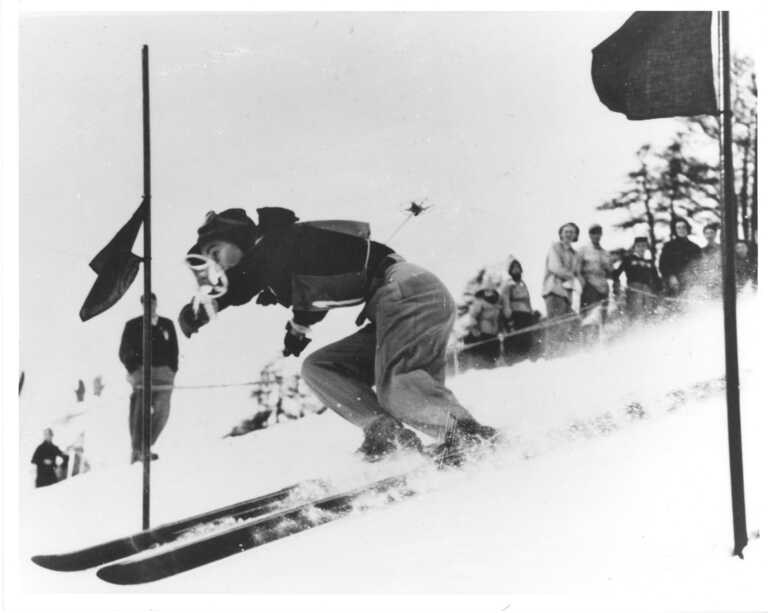
Gretchen Fraser skiing in a Special Slalom event on May 5, 1948, after winning an Olympic gold medal in February of the same year.

Gretchen Kunigk Fraser (February 11, 1919 – February 17, 1994) was an American alpine ski racer and nurse. She was the first American to win an Olympic gold medal in skiing, as well as the first American to win an Olympic silver medal in skiing. She was also the first American to be awarded the Pery Medal by the ski club of Great Britain, and National Ski Association's Beck International Trophy. She was also the skiing stand-in for ice skater Sonja Henie in the movies Thin Ice (1937) and Sun Valley Serenade (1941). Fraser was revered in her time for her contributions to American athletics, receiving ticker-tape parades and brand sponsorships upon her return to the United States following her Olympic win.

== Background ==
Born in Tacoma, Washington, Gretchen Kunigk was the daughter of German and Norwegian immigrants, Willibald and Clara Kunigk. Her Norwegian-born mother was a skier and Gretchen first skied at age 13, at Paradise Valley on the south slopes of Mount Rainier in December 1932. Under the tutelage of Otto Lang, she became a proficient ski racer. Gretchen served as president of the Ski Club at Stadium High School in Tacoma, Washington and later competed on the ski team at the University of Puget Sound. As a member of the ski team, she won several competitions on Mount Rainier.

== Athletic career ==
In 1938, she traveled to Sun Valley, Idaho to compete in the second Harriman Cup, a new international event featuring the best racers in the world. Both Gretchen and her husband, Donald, were members of the 1940 Olympic team, games that were cancelled due to World War II. She spent the war years skiing in Otto Lang's military training films for the 10th Mountain Division and helping to rehabilitate wounded and disabled veterans through skiing, setting the stage for her lifelong commitment to working with disabled skiers (see Nursing Career section below).

Fraser competed in the Winter Olympics in 1948. A week before her 29th birthday, Fraser won the gold medal in the slalom and a silver medal in the combined event in St. Moritz, Switzerland. She returned home to a ticker-tape parade in New York and grand receptions in Tacoma, Washington, Vancouver, Washington, and Portland, Oregon. Fraser was the guest of honor for the 1948 Daffodil Parade in Tacoma, Washington.

She retired from competition soon after the 1948 Olympics and became an ambassador for Sun Valley and skiing. However, she returned to the skiing world as the coach of the 1952 US Women's Olympic team. Later in life she was a mentor to aspiring female ski racers at Sun Valley, including Olympians Susie Corrock, Christin Cooper, Picabo Street, two-time gold medalist Andrea Mead Lawrence, and Paralympian Muffy Davis.

Fraser's husband, Don, was a pilot, which inspired her to begin flying. She began flying before the Olympics but officially became a private pilot in 1958. She later met pilot Chuck Yeager and co-piloted jets with him. She was inducted into the Boise, Idaho chapter of The Ninety-Nines, Inc., an association for women pilots.

=== Gretchen's First Place Wins ===
==== 1937 ====
- Pacific Northwest Championships (PNW), Spokane, WA
- PNW Downhill, Mt. Hood, OR
- PW Combined, Mt. Hood, OR

==== 1938 ====
- Open Slalom, Mt. Rainier, WA
- Silver Skies, Mt. Rainier, WA
- Golden Rose Downhill, Mt Hood, OR

==== 1939 ====
- PNSA Championships, Yakima, WA
- Jeffers Cup, Sun Valley, ID
- Alta Snow Cup, Alta, UT

==== 1940 ====
- Silver Belt, Sugar Bowl, CA
- Downhill, US Nationals, Aspen, CO
- Combined, US Nationals, Aspen, CO

==== 1941 ====
- Downhill, Harriman Cup, Sun Valley, ID
- Combined, Harriman Cup, Sun Valley, ID
- Slalom, US Nationals, Yosemite, CA

==== 1942 ====
- Snow Cup, Alta, UT
- Jeffers Cup, Sun Valley, ID

____________

World War II

____________

==== 1946 ====
- Downhill, Golden Rose, Mt. Hood, OR
- PNSA Amateur Championships, Stevens Pass, WA
- Downhill, Slalom, Combined Championships, Mt. Hood, OR

==== 1947 ====
- Downhill, Olympic Tryouts, Sun Valley, ID
- Combined, Olympic Tryouts, Sun Valley, ID
- Golden Rose, Mt. Hood, OR

Sources for the above wins from Gretchen's Gold, pages 171-172.

*At the time of these wins, Gretchen only competed in the United States. After Gretchen's two Olympic medal events, Europeans began inviting Americans to compete in European competitions. Gretchen was the inspiration for Europe to include American competitors in their events.

== Nursing career ==
After the Olympics, Fraser resumed her work with the disabled community that had begun during WWII. A lifelong equestrian, she taught horseback riding and swimming in a rehabilitation clinic at Madigan Army Medical Center (then Madigan Convalescent Hospital) in Fort Lewis, Washington. She was a founding member of the Oregon Institute for Rehabilitation in Portland, which started as a small clinic with volunteers from the Junior League. She served on the board for 27 years (Gretchen's Gold 113–14). In addition to working at Madigan, Fraser worked at the United States Naval Special Hospital in Sun Valley and Burrell Hospital in Brighten, Utah.

During WWII, Gretchen implemented the first application of the Outrigger Ski System so the amputee veterans at the Sun Valley hospital could learn to ski. About fifteen years later, she helped to organize the Flying Outriggers Ski Club at Mt. Hood, Oregon, which was the first adaptive ski club in America. The outrigger ski system has been adapted throughout the world.

Fraser's work with paralympians in Sun Valley led to her earning the National Paralympic Coach of the Year award in 1984.

== Personal life ==
She met 1936 Olympian and Northwest ski champion Donald Fraser (1913–1994) of the University of Washington on the train trip to central Idaho. They were married in November 1939 in Tacoma and Sun Valley became their home. After the war, the Frasers moved to Vancouver, Washington. They had one son, Donald Fraser Jr.

Fraser was involved in the formation of the American Athletic Academy, assisting athletes with education and career counseling.

== Appearance in comic books ==
Gretchen Fraser was featured in two cartoons created by Wheaties cereal to promote their brand. These advertisements were showcased in various comic books.

Title	Date
Action Comics	April 1953
All American Western	
Batman	April/May 1952
Daffy Duck	
A Date with Judy	1952
Donald Duck	
Gene Autry Comics	April 1953
The Lone Ranger	April 1953
Mutt and Jeff	
Marge's Little Lulu	April 1953
Red Ryder Comics	April 1953
Edgar Rice Burroughs' Tarzan	April 1953
Walt Disney's Comics and Stories	April 1953
Walter Lantz New Funnies	April 1953

== Death ==
Fraser died at age 75 in February 1994, during the Winter Olympics; her husband of 54 years, Don Fraser, had died a month earlier. They are buried at the city cemetery in Ketchum, Idaho.

== Legacy ==
- Fraser was inducted into the Tacoma-Pierce County Sports Hall of Fame in 1957.
- Fraser was inducted into the National Ski Hall of Fame in 1960 and the Intermountain Ski Hall of Fame in Park City in the inaugural class of 2002.
- In 1960, she was inducted into the State of Washington Sports Hall of Fame and the University of Puget Sound Hall of Fame.
- Fraser was inducted into the Oregon Sports Hall of Fame in 1987.
- Fraser was inducted into the Sun Valley Winter Sports Hall of Fame Class of 2013 with her husband, Don Fraser.
- In 2020, Governor of Idaho Brad Little recommended Fraser in response to the Building and Rebuilding Monuments to American Heroes Executive Order.
- She was inducted into the Olympic and Paralympic Hall of Fame as part of the class of 2022, in the "Legend" category.
- On December 12, 2023, she was inducted into Stadium High School Wall of Recognition in Tacoma, Washington.
- Gretchen's Gold, a ski run at Sun Valley's Seattle Ridge is named for her, as well as Gretchen's Restaurant in the Sun Valley Lodge.
- Gretchen Fraser Neighborhood park in Vancouver, Washington, is named for her.

Several Pacific Northwest museums honor Fraser's importance in the skiing world, including the Alf Engen Ski Museum (Park City, Utah), Wood River Museum (Ketchum, Idaho), Tacoma History Museum (Tacoma, WA), Washington State Ski and Snowboard Museum (Snoqualmie Pass, Washington), the Νorthwest Room at the Tacoma Public Library (Tacoma, Washington), and the Tacoma-Pierce County Sports Museum (Tacoma, Washington).

== Other sources ==
- Allen, E. John B. (2011) Historical Dictionary of Skiing (Historical Dictionaries of Sports) ISBN 978-0810868021
- Commire, Anne; Klezmer, Deborah (2002). Women in World History. Yorkin Publications. ISBN 978-0787637361.
- Pfeifer, Luanne (1994) "The One and Only Gretchen" Skiing Heritage Journal Vol. 6, No. 2
