= Resi Hammerer =

Austrian alpine skier (1925–2010)

Olympic medal record

Women's Alpine skiing
Bronze medal – third place	1948 St. Moritz	Downhill

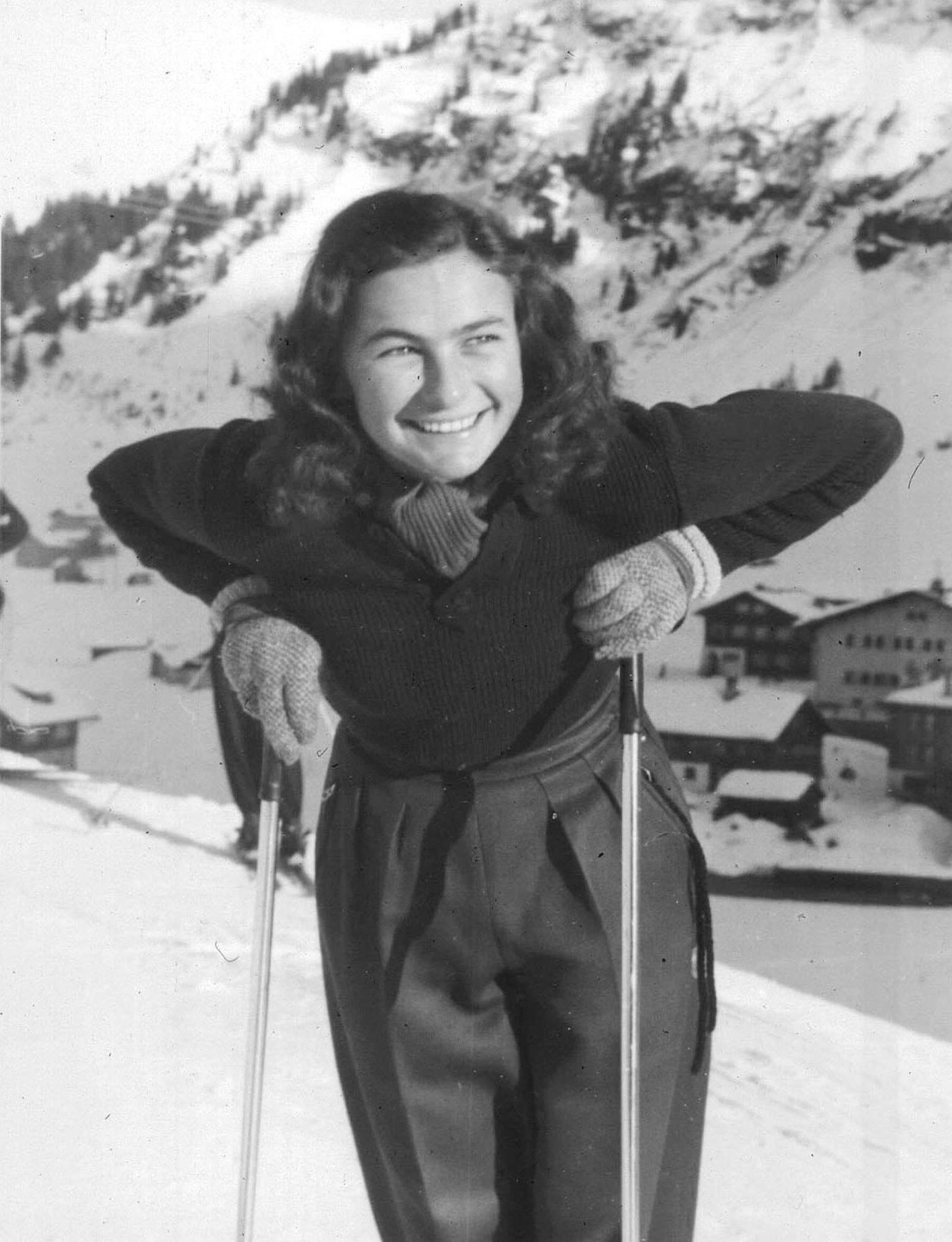

Therese "Resi" Hammerer (18 February 1925 – 14 June 2010) was an Austrian alpine skier who competed in the 1948 Winter Olympics.

She was born in Mittelberg.

In 1948 she won the bronze medal in the downhill event. In the slalom competition she finished seventh and in the Alpine combined contest she finished twelfth.
