= Wolfgang Bartels =

Wolfgang Bartels may refer to:

- Wolfgang Bartels (skier) (1940–2007), German alpine skier
- Wolfgang Bartels (politician, born 1903) (1903–1975), German politician of the Christian Democratic Union
- Wolfgang Bartels (politician, born 1890), KPD politician, member of the Lenin League
