= Martina Schild =

Swiss alpine skier (born 1981)

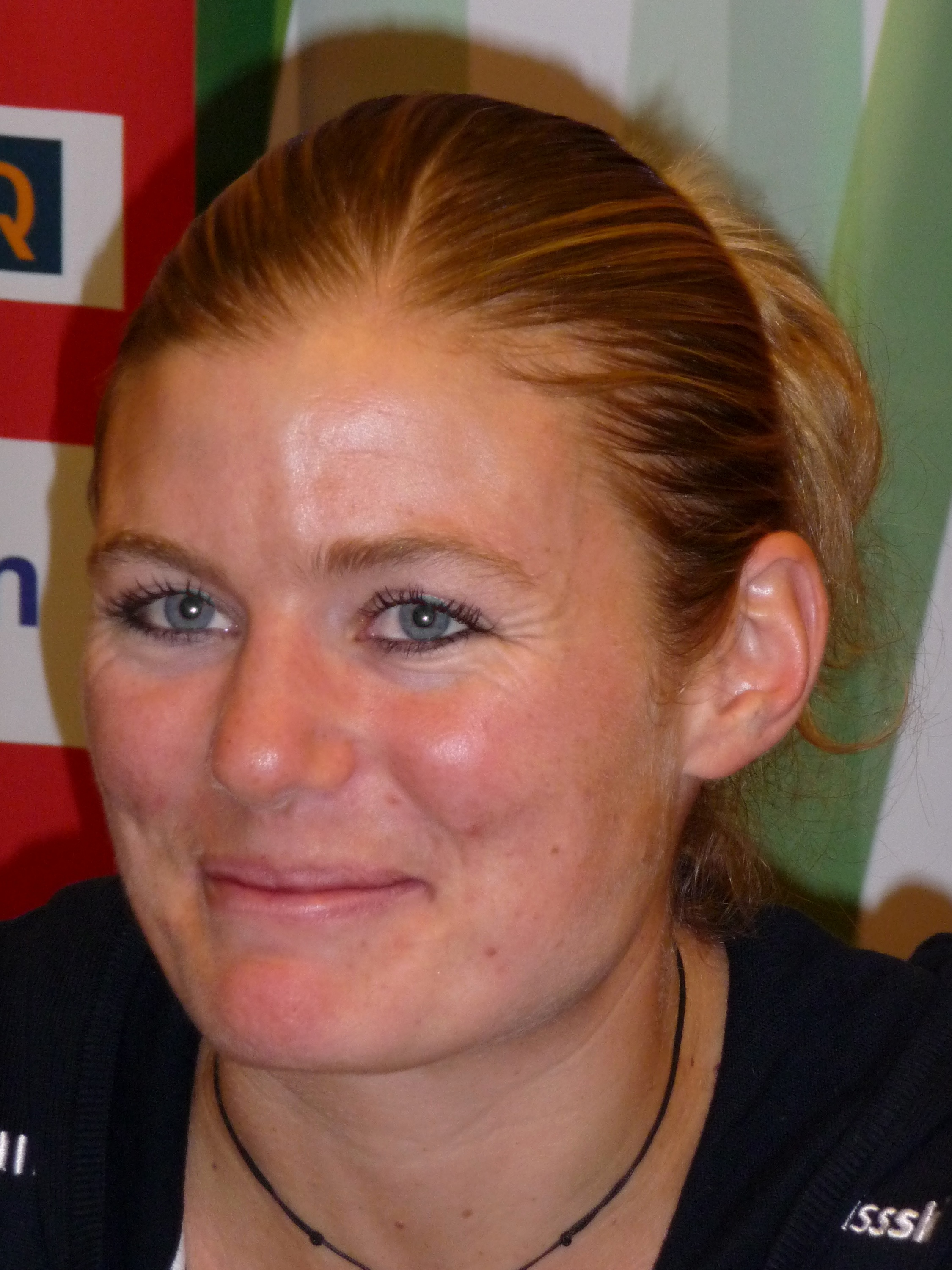

Personal information
- Born: 26 October 1981 (age 44) Brienz, Switzerland
Medal record
Women's alpine skiing
Representing Switzerland
Olympic Games
| Silver medal – second place | 2006 Turin | Downhill |

Martina Schild (born 26 October 1981, in Brienz) is a Swiss alpine skier competing in downhill and super-G.

At the 2006 Winter Olympics, she won the silver medal in the women's downhill. She placed 6th in the women's super-G.

She is the granddaughter of skier Hedy Schlunegger (1923–2003), who was the Olympic downhill champion of 1948. Due to persistent back problems, Martina Schild announced her retirement from active ski racing before the start of the 2013/14 season.

== World Cup victories ==
| Date | Location | Race |
|---|---|---|
| 2 December 2007 | (Canada) Lake Louise | Super-G |
