= Irène Molitor =

Swiss alpine skier (1927–2018)

Irène Molitor (1 April 1927 – 2018) was a Swiss alpine skier who competed in the 1948 Winter Olympics.
