= Sophie Nogler =

Austrian alpine skier (1924–2015)

Sophie Nogler (25 April 1924 – 12 October 2015) was an Austrian alpine skier who competed in the 1948 Winter Olympics.
