= Brynhild Grasmoen =

American alpine skier

- Brynhild Grasmoen, from a 1947 newspaper

Personal information
- Born: January 7, 1929; Merced, California, United States
- Died: December 30, 2000 (aged 71); Merced, California, United States

Sport
- Sport: Alpine skiing

Brynhild "Bee" Grasmoen (January 7, 1929 – December 30, 2000) was an American alpine skier. She competed in two events at the 1948 Winter Olympics.

== Early life and education ==
Grasmoen was born in Merced, California, the daughter of Arnold Joselin Grasmoen and Ione Julia Cunningham Grasmoen. Her father was a banker and an Air Force officer during World War II. She attended Hobbs High School in New Mexico, and graduated from Merced High School in 1946. She graduated from Stanford University in 1953.

== Career ==
She won the Butler Cup at Badger Pass in 1941, at the age of 12, and the New Mexico State women's skiing championship in 1943, when she was 14. In 1946, an age minimum was changed to allow her to qualify as a Class B Skier in the Far Western Ski Association. Grasmoen competed in two alpine skiing events at the 1948 Winter Olympics in St. Moritz, Switzerland. She won the Gold Sun Run at Sun Valley in 1949. She was crowned queen of the Nevada Winter Carnival in 1952.

Grasmoen's athletic career ended when she was badly injured in a car accident near Flagstaff, Arizona. Later in life she was active in women's club activities, and painted oils and watercolors.

== Personal life and legacy ==
Grasmoen married twice. She married Arthur Murray Robinson in 1950. In 1957, she married physicist Kent Dedrick. She lived with her parents from the late 1950s into the 1990s. She died in 2000, at the age of 71, in Merced. Her will left several large donations to local charities, including $200,000 each to the Merced County Arts Council, the Merced College Foundation, the Merced County Historical Society, the Merced Center for the Performing Arts, and the Arden Wood Benevolent Association of San Francisco.
