= Hedy Schlunegger =

Swiss alpine skier

Medal record

Women's Alpine Skiing

Representing Switzerland

Olympic Games
Gold medal – first place	1948 St. Moritz	Downhill

Hedy Kaufmann-Schlunegger (10 March 1923 – 5 July 2003) was a Swiss alpine skier. At the 1948 Winter Olympics, Hedy Schlunegger was the first Olympic Gold medalist in Lady's Downhill skiing.

After her success in skiing, Hedy Kaufmann-Schlunegger and her husband managed a sporting goods store in Grindelwald. Olympic medalist Martina Schild is her granddaughter.
