= Lina Mittner =

Swiss alpine skier (1919–2013)

Lina Mittner (10 February 1919 – 25 February 2013) was a Swiss alpine skier who competed in the 1948 Winter Olympics.
