= Erika Mahringer =

Austrian alpine skier (1924–2018)

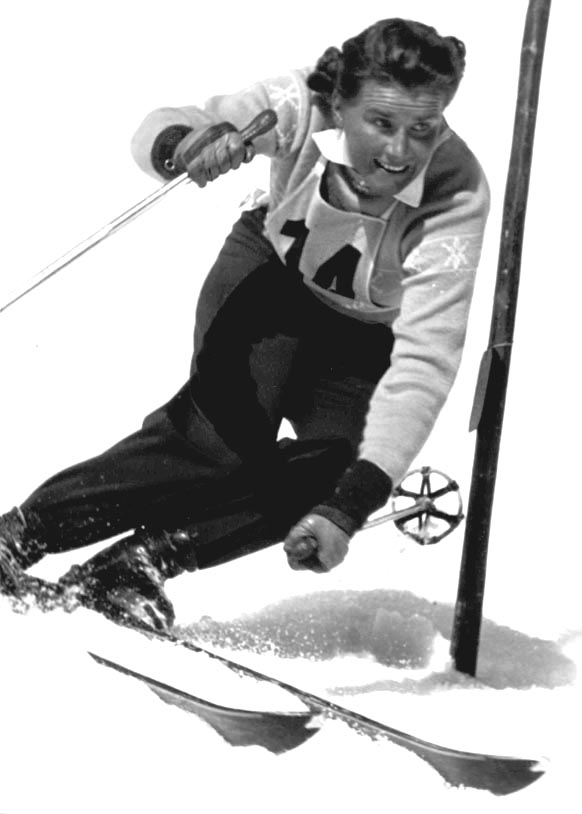
- Erika Mahringer in 1954

Medal record

Women's Alpine skiing
Bronze medal – third place	1948 St. Moritz	Slalom
Bronze medal – third place	1948 St. Moritz	Combined

Erika "Riki" Mahringer (16 November 1924 – 30 October 2018) was an Austrian alpine skier.

== Biography ==
She competed in the 1948 and 1952 Winter Olympics. In 1948 she won the bronze medal in the slalom event as well as in the Alpine combined competition. In the downhill contest she finished 19th. Four years later she finished fourth in the 1952 Olympic downhill event. In the same year she finished 17th in the giant slalom competition and 22nd in the slalom contest.

Mahringer earned silver medals in the FIS Alpine Skiing World Championships 1950 at Aspen (slalom and downhill), and in the giant slalom she finished fourth. She was a six time Austrian Champion (downhill 1948, 1951, 1952; slalom 1951; giant slalom 1951; Alpine Combined 1951). In 1951, she was named Austrian Sports Personality of the Year.

Mahringer was born in Linz. She wed fellow skier Ernst Spiess in 1954. Together they founded the Mayrhofen Ski School. In 1955, they opened "Riki’s Skikindergarten", the world's first children's ski school. Riki and Ernst are the parents of Uli Spiess and Nicola Spiess who became Alpine ski racers like their parents.

== See also ==
- Nicola Spiess (daughter)
- Uli Spiess (son)
