= Rosemary Sparrow =

British alpine skier (1925–2025)

Personal information
- Nationality: British
- Born: 6 July 1925 Chelford, Cheshire, England
- Died: 13 October 2025 (aged 100) Fayence, France

Sport
- Sport: Alpine skiing

Rosemary Sparrow (6 July 1925 – 13 October 2025) was a British alpine skier. She competed in two events at the 1948 Winter Olympics. Sparrow died in Fayence, France on 13 October 2025, at the age of 100.
