= Andrea Mead Lawrence =

American alpine skier

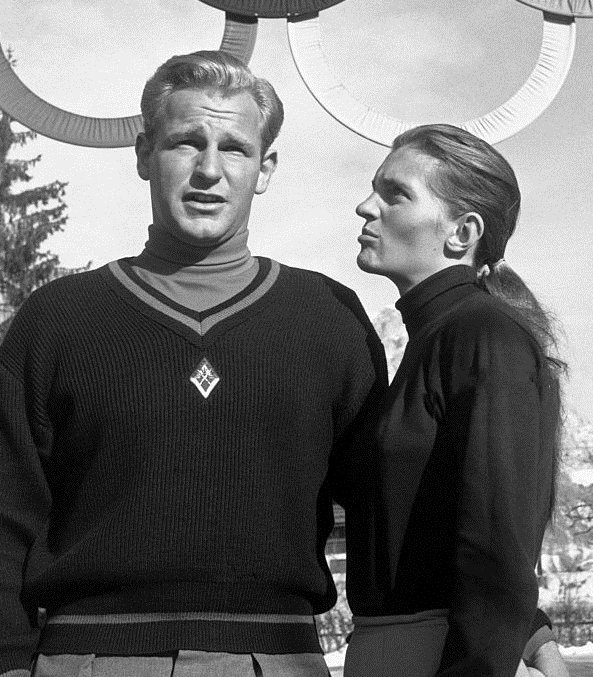
- David and Andrea Lawrence at the 1956 Olympics

Personal information
- Born: April 19, 1932 Rutland County, Vermont, U.S.
- Died: March 30, 2009 (aged 76) Mammoth Lakes, California, U.S.
- Height: 5 ft 8 in (173 cm)

Skiing career
- Sport: Alpine skiing
- Club: Pico Peak Ski Club
- Disciplines: Downhill, giant slalom, slalom, combined

Olympics
- Teams: 3 – (1948, 1952, 1956)
- Medals: 2 (2 gold)

World Championships
- Teams: 4 – (1948, 1950, 1952, 1956) includes 3 Olympics
- Medals: 2 (2 gold)
Medal record
Women's alpine skiing
Representing the United States
Olympic Games
Gold medal – first place	1952 Oslo	Slalom
Gold medal – first place	1952 Oslo	Giant slalom

Andrea Mead Lawrence (April 19, 1932 – March 30, 2009) was an American alpine ski racer and environmentalist. She competed in three Winter Olympics and one additional World Championship (Olympic competitions also counted as the Worlds during that period), and was the first American alpine skier to win two Olympic gold medals.

== Skiing career ==
Mead was born in Rutland County, Vermont, to an alpine skiing family that owned and operated the Pico Peak ski area. At age 14 she made the national team, and at age 15 competed in the 1948 Winter Olympics in St. Moritz, Switzerland, where she placed eighth in the slalom. Two years later, Mead placed sixth in the giant slalom and ninth in the downhill at the 1950 World Championships in Aspen, United States.

At the 1952 Winter Olympics in Oslo, Norway, Mead Lawrence was selected as captain of the U.S. women's team at age 19. This led to her being the January 21 Time cover-story, just days before the team arrived in Oslo. The Time story was prescient – she won both the slalom and the giant slalom events.

Between the 1952 and 1956 Winter Olympics, Mead Lawrence gave birth to three children, sitting out the 1954 World Championship season.

Returning for the 1956 Winter Olympics, in Cortina d'Ampezzo, Italy, Mead Lawrence competed in all three disciplines, placing fourth in the giant slalom.

In 1958, just two years after retiring from competition, Mead Lawrence was inducted into the U.S. National Ski Hall of Fame. She was chosen as the penultimate torchbearer at the 1960 Winter Olympics in Squaw Valley, US, passed it to American 1952 Olympic gold medal speed skater Ken Henry, who circled the ice rink then ascended the Tribune of Honor and ignited the Olympic flame.

== Olympic results ==
Year	Age	Slalom	Giant Slalom	Downhill	Combined
1948	15	8	not run	35	21
1952	19	1	1	17	not run
1956	23	25	4	30	not run

== World Championship results ==
Year	Age	Slalom	Giant Slalom	Downhill	Combined
1948	15	8	not run	35	21
1950	17	17	6	9	not run
1952	19	1	1	17	not run
~~1954~~	~~21~~	~~did not compete~~			
1956	23	25	4	30	

From 1948 through 1980, the Winter Olympics were also the World Championships for alpine skiing.

== Life after ski racing ==
After fighting against development at Mammoth Mountain Ski Area, she was elected as a Mono County supervisor in 1982, and served for 16 years.

In 1980, her memoir was published as A Practice of Mountains, with Sara Burnaby as a co-author.

In 2003, she founded the Andrea Lawrence Institute for Mountains and Rivers', a non-profit organization committed to conservation, specifically in the eastern Sierra Nevada mountains. A resident of the area for over 40 years, she was also a long-time advocate for the preservation of Mono Lake and other environmental concerns.

== Legacy ==
In 2009, a ski run at Mammoth Mountain was named in her honor.

On April 29, 2010, U.S. Senator Barbara Boxer and U.S. Representative Howard P. "Buck" McKeon announced legislation to rename Peak 12,240 in Mono County as "Mount Andrea Lawrence," in memory of Lawrence. On January 10, 2013, President Obama signed into law the Mt. Andrea Lawrence Designation Act of 2011, officially designating Mount Andrea Lawrence.

Lawrence is a member of the Vermont Sports Hall of Fame, inducted in its inaugural class of 2012.

On November 8, 2013, two Vermont non-profit organizations opened a new multi-use adaptive sports and youth skiing center at Andrea Mead Lawrence's home mountain of Pico Peak, Vermont. The Andrea Mead Lawrence Lodge at Pico will serve as the permanent home and base camp for the non-profit missions of Vermont Adaptive Ski and Sports and the Pico Ski Education Foundation.

== Personal life ==
=== Family ===
Mead married fellow U.S. Ski Team member David Lawrence in Switzerland in March 1951. They moved to a ranch in Parshall, Colorado in 1954 and then to Aspen in the 1960s, where she became a member of the town's planning board. The couple separated and divorced in 1967. With five young children and little money, she moved her family in 1968 to Mammoth Lakes, California, near Mammoth Mountain.

Her nephew is Matt Mead, Governor of Wyoming from 2011 to 2019.

=== Death ===
Lawrence was diagnosed with leiomyosarcoma in 2000, from which she died on March 30, 2009, at age 76.

== In popular culture ==
She was portrayed by Kandi McCoy (Daughter of Dave McCoy) in the 1975 film The Other Side of the Mountain (credited as "Candy McCoy").
