= Ruth-Marie Stewart =

American alpine skier (1927–2012)

Personal information
- Nationality: American
- Born: April 28, 1927; Brooklyn, New York, United States
- Died: March 10, 2012 (aged 84); Springfield, Massachusetts, United States

Sport
- Sport: Alpine skiing

Ruth-Marie Stewart (April 28, 1927 – March 10, 2012) was an American alpine skier. She competed in two events at the 1948 Winter Olympics.
