= Rebecca Cremer =

American alpine skier (1924–2006)

Personal information
- Nationality: American
- Born: April 3, 1924; Woodstock, Vermont, United States
- Died: April 20, 2006 (aged 82); Sonora, California, United States

Sport
- Sport: Alpine skiing

Rebecca Cremer (April 3, 1924 – April 20, 2006) was an American alpine skier. She competed in two events at the 1948 Winter Olympics.
