= Anikó Iglói =

Hungarian alpine skier (1908–2003)

Personal information
- Nationality: Hungarian
- Born: 11 November 1908 Kremnica, Austria-Hungary
- Died: 12 April 2003 (aged 94) Bregenz, Austria

Sport
- Sport: Alpine skiing

Anikó Iglói (11 November 1908 – 12 April 2003) was a Hungarian alpine skier. She competed in two events at the 1948 Winter Olympics.
