= Suzanne Thiollière =

French alpine skier (1924–1991)

Personal information
- Full name: Suzanne Thiolière
- Nationality: French
- Born: 17 September 1924; Chamonix-Mont-Blanc, France
- Died: 6 June 1991 (aged 66); Suisse

Sport
- Sport: Alpine skiing

Suzanne Thiollière (10 September 1924 – 6 June 1991) was a French alpine skier who competed in the 1948 Winter Olympics.
