= Božena Moserová =

Czech alpine skier (1926–2017)

Božena Moserová (30 June 1926 – 9 February 2017) was a Czech alpine skier who competed in the 1948 Winter Olympics.

Moserová died on 9 February 2017, at the age of 90.
