= Rosmarie Bleuer =

Swiss alpine skier (1926–2021)

Rosmarie Bleuer (16 March 1926 – 26 February 2021) was a Swiss alpine skier who competed in the 1948 Winter Olympics. Bleuer died in February 2021 at the age of 94.
