= Renata Carraretto =

Italian alpine skier (1923–2000)

Personal information
- Nationality: Italian
- Born: 27 October 1923; Cortina d'Ampezzo, Italy
- Died: 29 December 2000 (aged 77)

Sport
- Sport: Alpine skiing

Renata Carraretto (27 October 1923 – 29 December 2000) was an Italian alpine skier. She competed in three events at the 1948 Winter Olympics.
