= May Nilsson =

Swedish alpine skier (1921–2009)

Personal information
- Born: 5 May 1921 Åre, Sweden
- Died: 7 November 2009 (aged 88) Albertville, France

Sport
- Sport: Skiing
- Club: SLK Åre

May Nilsson (5 May 1921 – 7 November 2009) was a Swedish alpine skier, born in Åre. She won a bronze medal during the 1939 world championships in Zakopane at the women's slalom event.
