= Badrutt =

Badrutt is a surname. Notable people with the surname include:

- Caspar Badrutt (1848–1904), Swiss businessman, hotelier, and restaurateur
- Johannes Badrutt (1819–1889), Swiss businessman, hotelier, and restaurateur
- Reto Badrutt (1908–1974), Swiss ski jumper

== See also ==
- Badrutt's Palace Hotel
