= Digby Willoughby (bobsleigher) =

British soldier and bobsleigher (1934–2007)

- Born: 4 May 1934; India
- Died: 27 February 2007 (aged 72); St Moritz, Switzerland
- Education: Blundell's School
- Military career
- Allegiance: United Kingdom
- Branch: British Army
- Service years: 1955–1978
- Rank: Lieutenant Colonel
- Unit: 2nd Gurkha Rifles
- Conflicts: Brunei revolt Indonesia–Malaysia confrontation

Lieutenant Colonel Digby Jeremie Willoughby MC MBE (4 May 1934 – 27 February 2007) was a soldier and sportsman, one of a two-man bobsleigh team that broke the world record in 1961. He later became chief executive of the St Moritz Tobogganing Club, a position he held for 24 years, fiercely guarding its traditions, which he saw as part of the last truly amateur sport.

== Early life ==
Digby Jeremie Willoughby was born in India, the son of an officer of the Bombay Grenadiers and the Indian Political Service. He was educated at Blundell's School in Tiverton and the RMA Sandhurst. He was commissioned into the 2nd Gurkha Rifles and joined the 1st Battalion in Malaya in 1955.

During his early leaves from the Far East Willoughby began to ride bobsleigh runs, and in 1961 his two-man team broke the world record on the St Moritz Bob run and in 1962 he was in the British contingent at the World Games at Garmisch-Partenkirchen in Bavaria. He had also started riding the single toboggans at the Cresta Run in St Moritz in 1958 and was a member of the Army Cresta team in the 1960s and 1970s.

== Military career ==
In 1962 Willoughby's battalion was ordered to Brunei, where the Brunei Revolt had broken out. Willoughby, with a small party of Gurkhas, rescued Omar Ali Saifuddien III, the Sultan of Brunei, from his palace and earned the Sultan's long-lasting gratitude. Willoughby was mentioned in dispatches for his actions.

During the Indonesia–Malaysia confrontation in 1963, arising from Indonesian attempts to destabilise the newly formed Malaysia, increasing incursions by Indonesian forces in the eastern Malaysian states of North Borneo and Sarawak, resulted in General Walter Walker, the director of Borneo operations (also an Old Blundellian), receiving approval to carry the campaign to the enemy by secretly crossing areas of the 1,000-mile border to launch offensives against the Indonesian bases.

In 1964 Willoughby, then a major in command of "A" Company, was instructed to mount one such operation. On 4 September he and his company were lifted by helicopter to the Sabah-Kalimantan border and, the next day, guided by a village headman, they set off across the border into Kalimantan. Two days later the Gurkhas became embroiled in a battle with Indonesian forces and carried the four enemy positions one after the other with minimal casualties before fighting off a counter-attack. The Indonesians withdrew with considerable losses in men and equipment and Willoughby was awarded an immediate Military Cross.

He subsequently completed a tour as the company commander of Ypres Company at the Royal Military Academy Sandhurst during which time the eldest son of the Sultan he rescued, Hassanal Bolkiah, was an officer cadet. Willoughby commanded his battalion from 1972 to 1975.

== Later life ==
Willoughby took early retirement from the Army and from 1978 combined work as an auctioneer’s representative with that of secretary and chief executive of the St Moritz Tobogganing Club, an appointment which he held for 24 years and which he had coveted ever since his early runs down the Cresta. He insisted that anyone wishing to do the Cresta Run attend a briefing given by him. Around the walls of the lecture room were many photographs and X-Rays of injuries following accidents on the Run. Most were of him.

In Q1 1969 he married Lauren Wade in Westminster. They had no children, and divorced.

In Q1 1974 he married Cherry H.V. Wade - a cousin of his ex-wife - in Sturminster Newton, who gave him a daughter Olivia Clare in 1976 and a son Toby Marcus D. in 1980.

Willoughby was appointed MBE in 2002. He died at St Moritz, the day before he was to watch the Willoughby Cup, which he founded.
