= Cresta Run =

Natural ice skeleton racing toboggan track in eastern Switzerland

Coordinates: 46.5025749°N 9.8450459°E

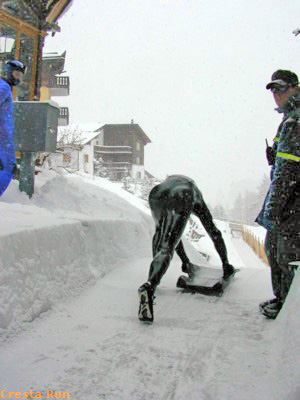
Start at Cresta Run

Location in the Alps of Europe

The Cresta Run is a natural ice track in eastern Switzerland used for skeleton-toboggan racing. Located in the winter sports town of St. Moritz, the 1.2125 km (0.753 mi) run is one of the few in the world dedicated entirely to skeleton. It was built in 1884 near the hamlet of Cresta in the municipality of Celerina/Schlarigna by the Outdoor Amusement Committee of the Kulm Hotel and the people of St. Moritz. It has continued as a partnership to this day between the St. Moritz Tobogganing Club (SMTC), founded in 1887, and the people of St. Moritz.

The sport of intramural sled racing originated in winter resort activities at the Kulm Hotel St. Moritz during the early 1870s. SMTC members still congregate for lunch in the 'Sunny Bar' at the Kulm. In the early days of competitive sledding, the predominant style was luge-style racing, lying on one's back, but the invention of the flexible runner sled (Flexible Flyer) in 1887, known colloquially as 'the America', led to one Mr. Cornish using the head-first style in the 1887 Grand National. He finished fourteenth due to some erratic rides but established a trend, and by the 1890 Grand National all competitors were riding head-first. The head-first style for a time became known as 'Cresta' racing.

== The sport and its history ==
The Cresta Run and the SMTC were founded by devotees of sledding (tobogganing in English) who adopted a head-first (prone) technique of racing down an icy run, as opposed to the feet-first (supine) and somewhat faster luge race. Both evolving sports were natural extensions of the invention of steerable sleds during the early 1870s by British guests of the Kulm hotel in St. Moritz. The initial crude sleds were developed almost accidentally—as bored well-to-do gentlemen naturally took to intramural competition in the streets and byways of mountainous downtown St. Moritz posing a risk to each other and pedestrians alike. This gave impetus to steering the sleds, and soon runners and a primitive mechanism evolved to allow some steerage along the longer curving streets of the 1870s. It also allowed higher speeds on the longer runs. Local views varied, but eventually complaints grew louder and Kulm hotel owner Caspar Badrutt built the first natural ice run for his guests, as part of his efforts to popularize wintering in the mountain resort, while careful not to lose customers to boredom, nor his workforce to injury from errant sleds on the streets.

The committee members were Major William Henry Bulpett (founder of the St. Moritz Tobogganing Club), George Robertson, Charles Digby Jones (Robertson and Digby Jones planned the proposed course), C. Metcalfe, and J. Biddulph.

== The run ==
The head (top) of the run is located under the remains of a 12th Century church, demolished in 1890, known as the 'Leaning Tower'. The overall drop is 157 m (515 ft) and the gradient varies from 2.8 to 1 to 8.7 to 1 (length to drop).

The modern Cresta track is not shared with bobsled, unlike the original half-pipe sledding track built by hotelier Caspar Badrutt for his guests. Most of it is located within the contour of a steep ravine and is recreated each winter using the rocky ravine and banks of earth as a buttress for the pack ice. The run is owned and operated, created in 1885 by British military officers with the official name of the St. Moritz Tobogganing Club (SMTC), but is generally referred to as 'The Cresta Run'.

The course has two entrances known as 'Top' and 'Junction' respectively, with two banks, known as 'Upper' 'and 'Lower'. The entrance at Junction is adjacent to the SMTC clubhouse and is about a third of the way down from Top along the run. Similarly, the exit is simply called 'Finish' and given a typical average speed of more than 50 mph, an experienced rider will exit the course at more than 80 mph when riding from Top.

The track was used for the skeleton event in both the 1928 and the 1948 Winter Olympics. These were the only Olympics with skeleton until 2002.

=== Male preserve ===
The exclusion of women from the course, which was enforced until December 2018, dates from the late 1920s and was instituted because of injuries to female racers and the incorrect belief that excessive sledding caused breast cancer. It came into effect in 1929, though women had been banned from competitive events several years earlier. Until 2018, women were only allowed to become "non-active" members; in a late 2018 St. Moritz Tobogganing Club meeting, members voted by a two-thirds majority to allow women to be "active" members again, and ride the Cresta Run.

== Cresta and skeleton ==
Whilst the Cresta Run is often considered to be the birthplace of modern day skeleton and acted as the course for Skeleton events in the 1928 and 1948 Winter Olympics, Cresta riding is notably different from modern day Skeleton sliding. Cresta Riding requires significant movement on the toboggan in order to navigate the track. Such movement includes riders moving their position back and forwards on the toboggan, and actively pushing the toboggan with your right hand in order to manoeuvre through Shuttlecock and Thoma. On the other hand, modern Skeleton sliding requires much less movement on the toboggan, and the sleds are generally speaking more flexible and sensitive than those for the Cresta. Cresta Toboggans possess longer, more prominent knives on the back of the runners than their modern-day skeleton counterparts. This is in order to achieve greater grip, as unlike in modern Skeleton which takes place on Bob-Runs, one can exit the Cresta Run at numerous points if they are going too fast or are out of control.

Toboggans used by the Cresta Run are broadly separated into two primary categories: Traditionals and Flat-Tops. Traditional toboggans are the toboggans that every Cresta Rider initially starts on, and have been used since the 1900s; as an evolution of the earlier Americas toboggan. Traditionals are characterised by a prominent sliding seat and having the runners integrated into the frame. The sliding seat allows riders to move back on the toboggan prior to entry of Shuttlecock to place more weight on the knives, therefore gaining greater control and grip. Flat-Tops were introduced to the Cresta by Reto Gansser (brother of 8-time Grand National Winner Franco Gansser) in the 1960s and became the basis for modern day skeleton sleds. Flat-Tops are characterised by either a steel or carbon fibre base with removable runners. Modern-day are much more akin to Skeleton sleds, with some manufacturers providing Sleds to Olympic Skeleton teams and amateur Cresta Riders alike. Unlike the traditional toboggan, the Flat-Top lacks a moving seat, and is more sensitive and faster. As a result, the secretariat requires riders to achieve consistent rides of 48 seconds from Junction on a Traditional in order to convert to a flat-top. Converts are then taught by their Flat-Top Guru, an experienced flat top rider who is given permission by the secretariat to tutor the converts in Flat-Top riding. It is up to Tower and the Secretariat to determine whether they are a sufficiently skilled and safe rider to continue riding on a flat-top.

== The club ==
The St. Moritz Tobogganing Club was founded in 1887. There are many more luge and bobsled runs world-wide, but the club is devoted to head first sledding. The club asserts that most of the other sledding sports are dominated by professionals and is one of the last bastions of the genuine amateur in sport.

As in many social clubs, members are elected from a list of qualifiers called the Supplementary List. The course is open to anyone who meets the three criteria for joining the list, and need not be English. It has a lot of club rites such as the "Firework", the "Shuttlecock Club" and a dedicated drink, the "Bullshot". The highlight of the Shuttlecock Club is the yearly Shuttlecock Dinner. The dinner is organised by the Shuttlecock President. Prominent presidents have included Constantin von Liechtenstein, Gianni Agnelli, Gunther Sachs, Sir Dudley Cunliffe-Owen, Rolf Sachs, Lord Dalmeny, Graf Luca Marenzi, Marc M. K. Fischer, Lord Wrottesley, Jonny Seccombe and Sven Ley. The club sponsors more than thirty races each season which generally last from just before Christmas to late February. The track is opened as soon as it is seasonally possible to do so, and is kept open as long as natural weather conditions permit.

== Notable rider-members ==
Some notably good riders from the membership of the past were Nino Bibbia, Italy; Giorgio Jegher, Jack Heaton, USA; and Billy Fiske, USA (the first American pilot killed in World War II as a volunteer in the "Millionaire Squadron"). In 1955 the then 71-year-old Lord Brabazon won the Cresta Run Coronation Cup at an average speed of 71 km/h (44 mph).

Among the best riders in recent years: eight times Grand National winner was Swiss Franco Gansser, fifteen times Grand National winner Lord Wrottesley finished fourth at the 2002 Olympic Winter Games and was the top record holder (49.92 in 2015), former Junction record holder Johannes Badrutt (41.02 in 1999), and current Junction record holder is German Magnus Eger (40.94 in 2017). Marcel Melcher was the youngest ever winner (aged 19, in 1979) of the Grand National.

Wing Commander Andy Green is the RAF's team captain for the Cresta Run. Green is an established driver of land speed record cars, and holds the current land speed record which he achieved in Thrust SSC. He was also the driver for the Bloodhound LSR land speed record attempt until stepping down in November 2023.

Baron Raunchy was reported to have had the slowest ride from Junction, with a time of 380 seconds.

== Women and the Cresta ==
Women were not originally banned from the Cresta Run; for example, T. A. Cook records that, in 1895, various trials were made by women on the Cresta, testing different riding positions and different styles of toboggan—although at that time women riders were encouraged to use only the lower half of the course. Vera Barclay rode the Cresta Run from Top. She was followed by a young American man, Charles Lowe Boorum, Jnr., who said, "See you at the finish". Boorum started too fast and slid into Church Leap at such a speed that he crashed at the Shuttlecock, was hit by his toboggan and died from a fractured skull that evening.

From 1929 until December 2018 rules forbade women riders. In 2019 Carina Evans, of Britain, became the first woman to descend the Cresta Run from Top since the ban on women riders was lifted in 2018.

Towards the end of the season, there is a Ladies Event in which women compete from Junction by invitation only.
