= Johannes Badrutt =

Swiss businessman (1819–1889)

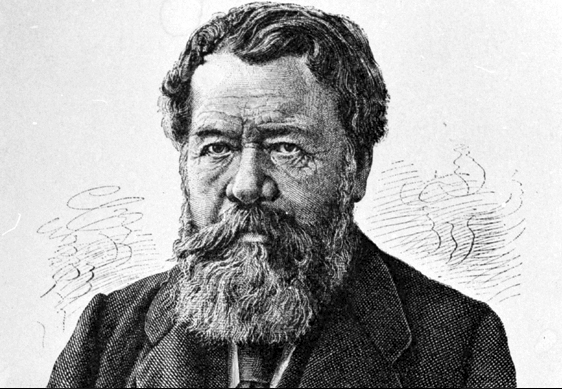
- Badrutt about 1885
- Born: Johannes Badrutt; 2 April 1819; Samedan, Switzerland
- Died: 1 November 1889 (aged 70); St. Moritz, Switzerland
- Occupations: Businessman, hotelier and restaurateur
- Known for: Founding and leading Kulm Hotel St. Moritz
- Spouse: Maria Berry (m. 1843; died 1877)
- Children: 11, including Caspar

Johannes Badrutt (2 April 1819 – 1 November 1889) was a Swiss businessman, hotelier and restaurateur who was primarily noted for developing St. Moritz, Switzerland into a year-round tourism destination during the 19th century.

He was the founder of Kulm Hotel St. Moritz in 1855. Badrutt's second eldest son was Caspar Badrutt, who founded Badrutt's Palace Hotel. He is the patriarch of the Badrutt family.

== Early life and education ==
Badrutt was born 2 April 1819 in Samedan, Switzerland, the fourth of nine children, to Johannes Badrutt Sr. (1791–1855), a contractor and iron merchant, and Anna Maria Badrutt (née Donatsch; 1790–1872). His paternal family was old established and originally hailed from Pagig. His maternal family was from Malans, with his parents being introduced while working in Chur.

While his brothers had a formal tertiary education in the form of an apprenticeship or college studies, he did not pursue any continuing education. He attended several schools and worked in Chiavenna and Chur to gain experience.

== Career ==
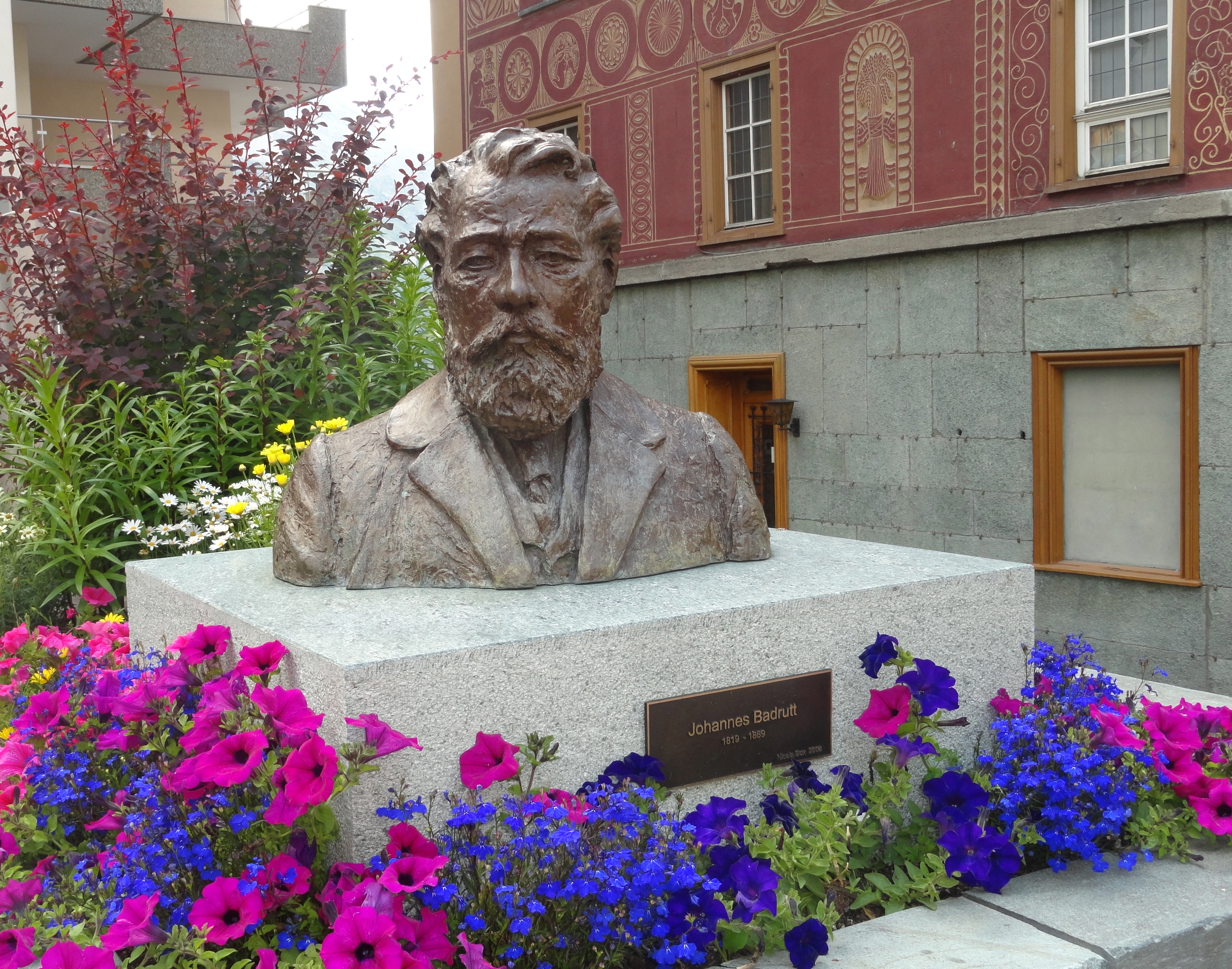
Badrutt memorial

In 1836, aged 17, he entered his father's building company. His father owned a small inn, called A la Vue du Bernina (the round gabled house is still standing today). Since 1855, Badrutt leased the Faller Inn which he had the intention of acquiring. In 1858, he sold his parents inn and purchased Faller's for 28,500 Swiss Francs. He and his wife started to upgrade the inn and soon it was known as Kulm Hotel St. Moritz, one of the leading hotels in the luxury industry. Badrutt made several strategic real estate investments at the time, for example he purchased the building site of today's Badrutt's Palace.

In 1882 he was the largest landowner in St. Moritz. He was a visionary in terms of technical development. In 1878, Badrutt went to the Exposition Universelle in Paris, France and purchased the first electrical lighting system, which he brought back to St. Moritz. He was also an art collector and patron.

== Personal life ==
In 1843 Badrutt married Maria Berry (1822–1877), daughter of Johannes Berry and Ursula Berry (née Casal), baker and municipal councilor of Chur. Her brother, Dr. Peter Robert Berry, served as municipal doctor and health officer, in St. Moritz. They had eleven children;

- Maria Badrutt (1844–1897), married Florio A. Tognoni (1841–1898), had a son.
- Johannes Badrutt Jr. (1846–1883), married Emilia Natalina Pidermann (1846–1915), originally of Pontresina, had five children.
- Caspar Badrutt (1848–1904), businessman, hotelier and restaurateur who founded Badrutt's Palace Hotel, married Ursulina Cadisch (1852–1905), had four children.
- Peter Robert Badrutt (1850–1904), married Victoria Angelica Catarina Faller (1852–1905).
- Paul Ivanhoe Badrutt (1851–1912), married Luise Frederike Bertschinger (1861–1948), had one son.
- Ursula Badrutt (1853–1928), married Eduard Florian Tognoni, without issue.
- Rosina Badrutt (1856–1925), married Johann Baptista Rocco (1847–1909).
- Alfons Badrutt (1857–1904), proprietor and general manager of Kulm Hotel as well as municipal and cantonal politician, married Maria Joos (1859–1940).
- Annetta Badrutt (1859–1859), stillborn.
- Annetta Badrutt II (1861–1863), died in childbed.
- Sidonia Badrutt (1862–1865), died in childbed.

Badrutt died 1 November 1889 aged 70 in St. Moritz.

== Literature ==
- Herbert Meider: Schweizer Pioniere der Hotellerie. Schweizerische Verkehrszentrale, Paudex 1976 (in German)
- Susanna Ruf: Fünf Generationen Badrutt. Hotelpioniere und Begründer der Wintersaison. Verein für wirtschaftshistorische Studien, Zürich 2010, ISBN 978-3-909059-49-2 (Schweizer Pioniere der Wirtschaft und Technik. Bd. 91). (in German)
