= Bobsleigh =

Olympic team winter sport

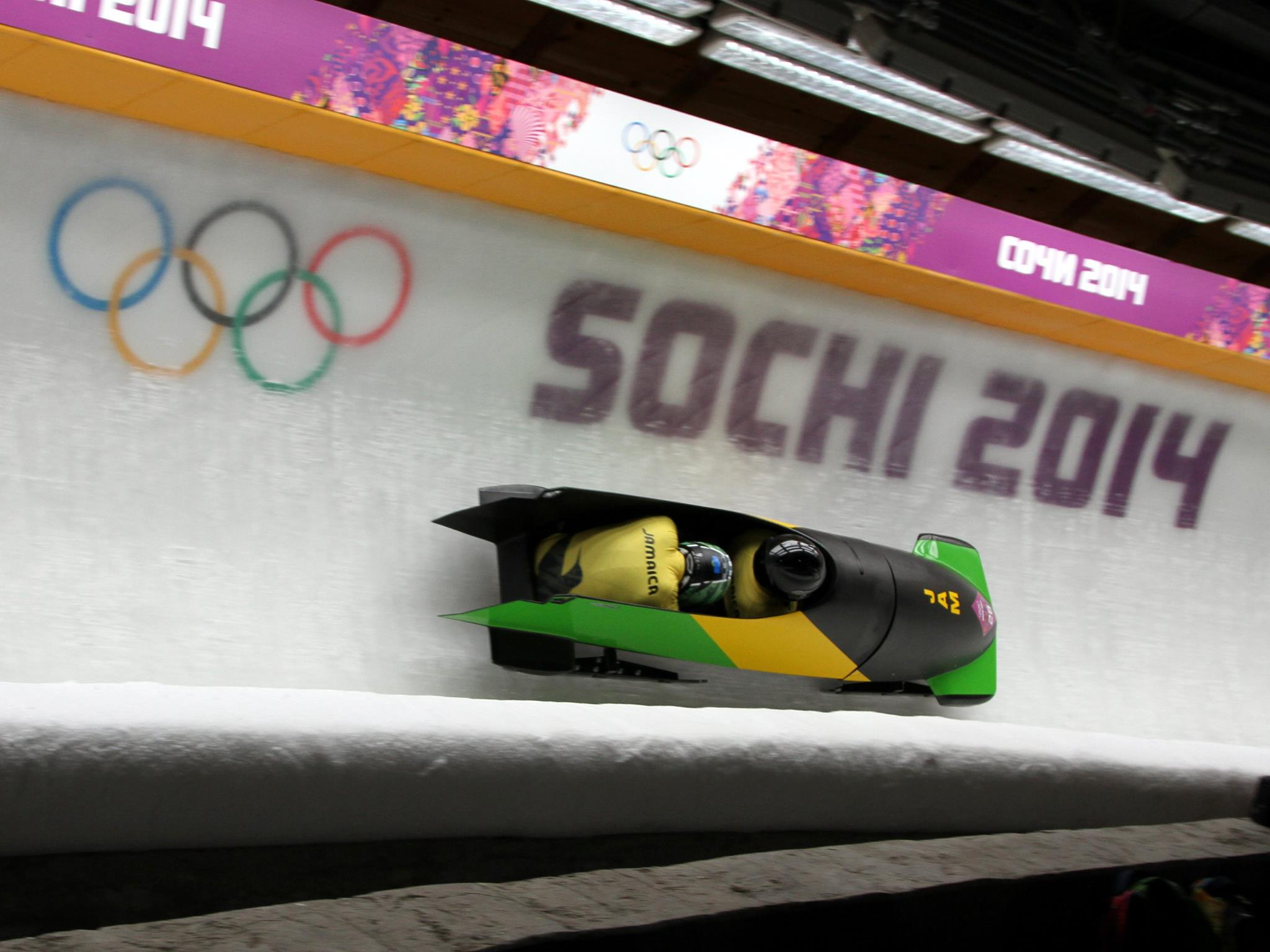
- The two-man Jamaican bobsleigh team at the 2014 Winter Olympics in Sochi, Russia
- Highest governing body: International Bobsleigh and Skeleton Federation
- Nicknames: Bobsled, Bob, King's Class
- First played: 1870s

Characteristics
- Contact: None
- Team members: Singles or teams of 2 or 4
- Mixed-sex: Yes, but usually in separate competitions
- Type: Winter sport, time trial
- Equipment: High-tech sleigh, helmet
- Venue: Bobsleigh tracks

Presence
- Olympic: since 1924

Bobsleigh or bobsled is a winter sport in which individual athletes or teams of two to four athletes make timed speed runs down narrow, twisting, banked, iced tracks in a gravity-powered sleigh. International bobsleigh competitions are governed by the International Bobsleigh and Skeleton Federation (formerly the FIBT).

The first bobsleds were built in the late 19th century in St. Moritz, Switzerland, by wealthy tourists from Victorian Britain who were staying at the Palace Hotel owned by Caspar Badrutt. The early sleds were adapted from boys' delivery sleds and toboggans. These eventually evolved into bobsleighs, luges and skeletons. Initially the tourists would race their hand-built contraptions down the narrow streets of St. Moritz; however, as collisions increased, growing opposition from St. Moritz residents led to bobsledding being eventually banned from public highways. The Cresta Run remains the oldest in the world and is the home of the St. Moritz Tobogganing Club. It has hosted two Olympic Winter Games and is still in use.

Modern bobsleigh teams compete to complete a downhill route in the fastest times. An aggregate time from several runs is used to determine the winners. The four-man event has been held in almost every Winter Games since they were first held, in Chamonix, France, in 1924. As of 2026 the only exception was the 1960 games in Squaw Valley (now Olympic Valley), California, United States, when the organizing committee decided not to build a track to reduce costs. The two-man event was introduced at the 1932 games and a two-woman event was first contested at the 2002 Winter Olympics. The women's monobob event was introduced in the 2022 games.

== Etymology ==
The name is derived from the action some early competitors adopted of bobbing back and forth inside their sleds to increase speed.

== History ==
=== Origins ===
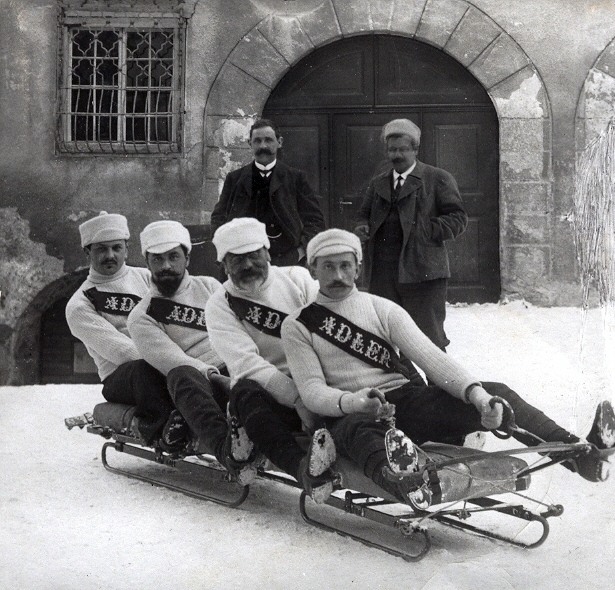
The Swiss bobsleigh team from Davos, c. 1910

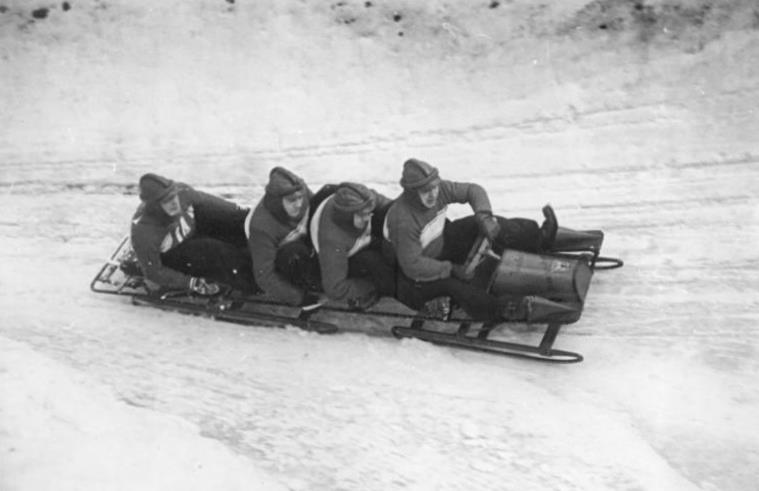
An East German bobsleigh in 1951, Oberhof track, East Germany

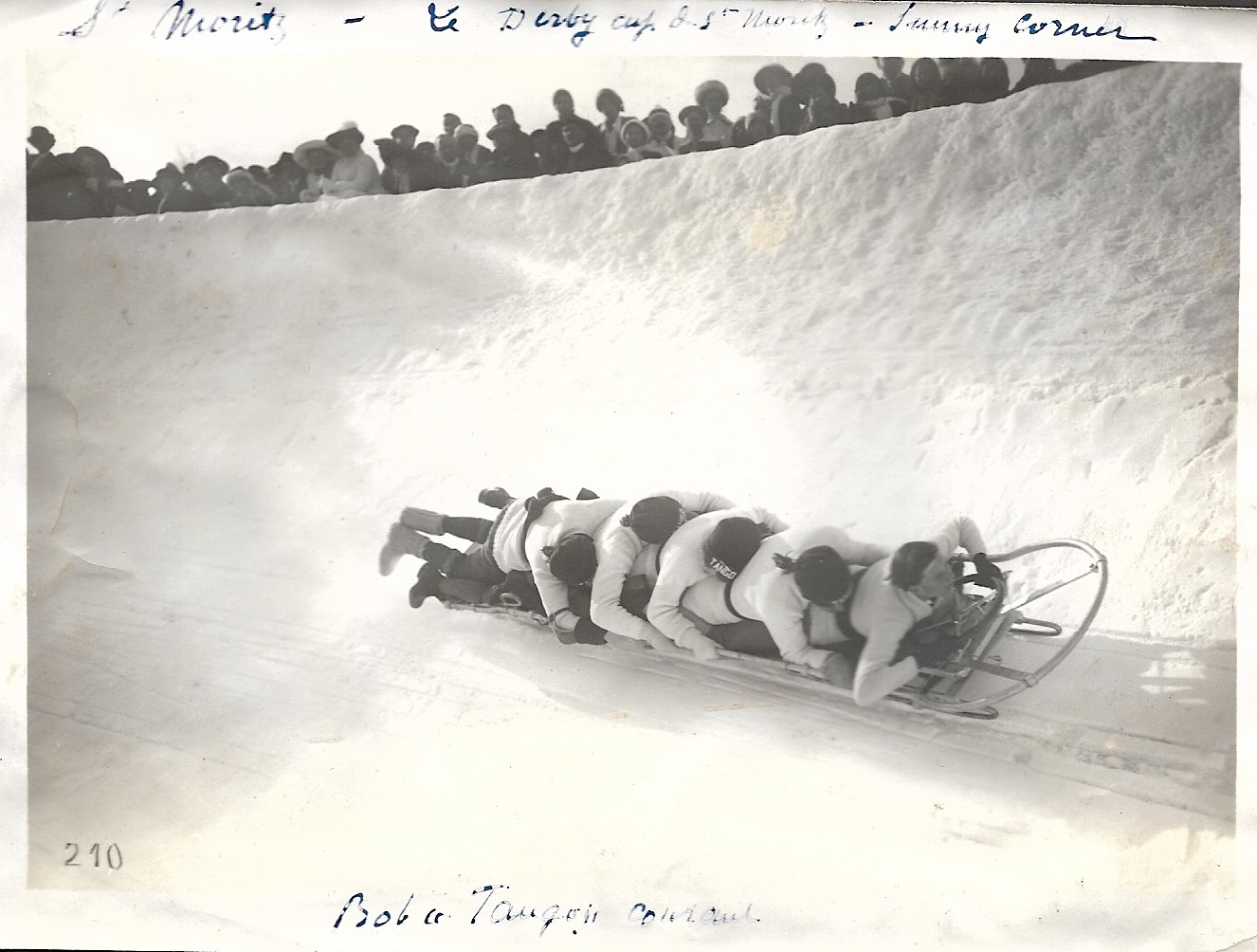
The 1913 Saint-Moritz Bobsleigh Derby Cup; photo by Albert Ewald

Although sledding on snow or ice had long been popular in many northern countries, the origins of bobsleighing as a modern sport are relatively recent.

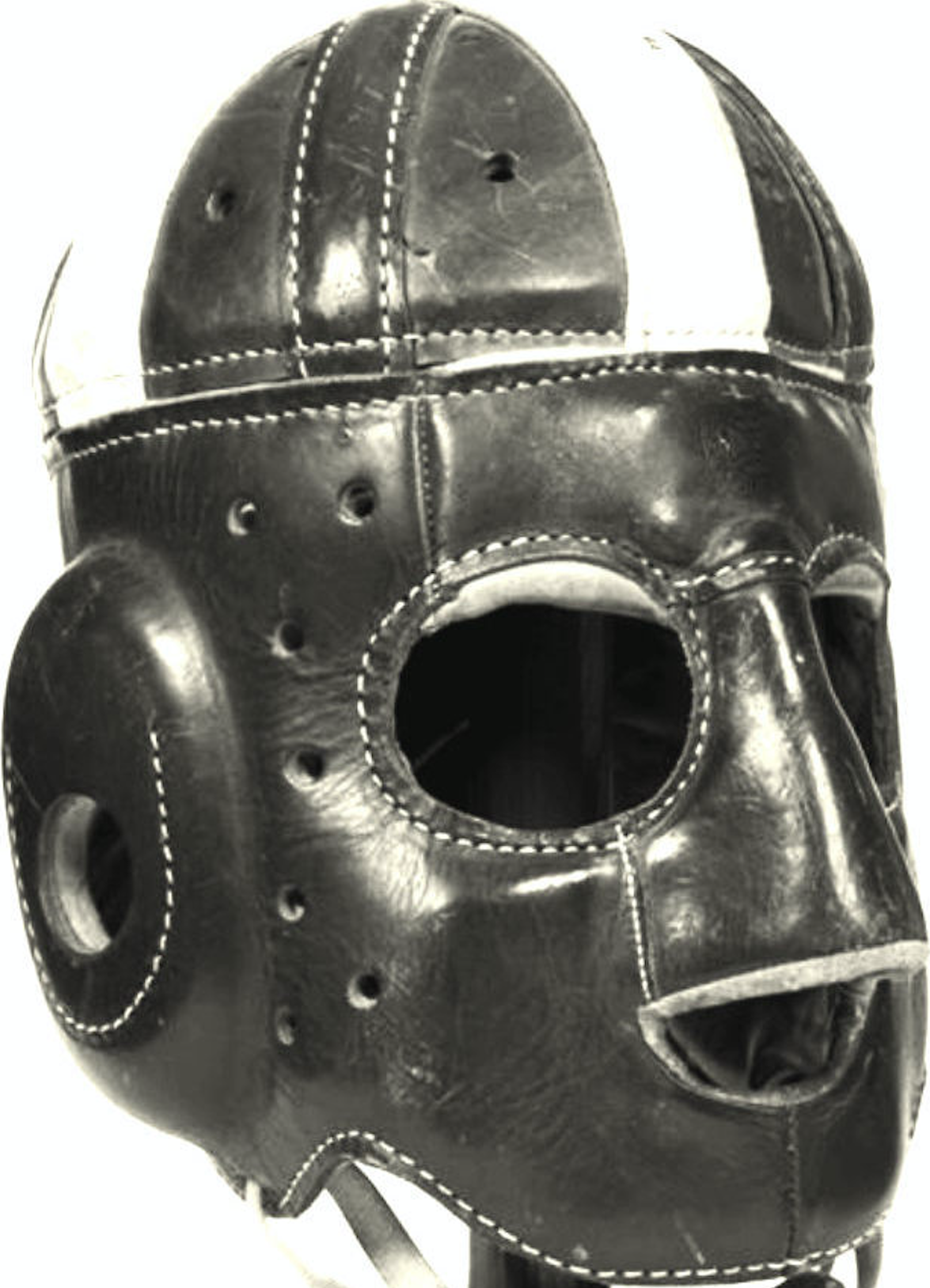
Early bobsled mask

It developed after hotelier Caspar Badrutt (1848–1904) convinced some wealthy English regular guests to remain through the entire winter at his hotel in the mineral spa town of St. Moritz, Switzerland. He had been frustrated that his hotel was only busy during the summer months. By keeping his guests entertained with food, alcohol and activities, he quickly established the concept of "winter resorting". Within a few years, wintering at Badrutt's St. Moritz hotel became very fashionable in Victorian Britain. However, with increased numbers this led some guests to search for new diversions. In the early 1870s some adventurous Englishmen began adapting boys' delivery sleds for recreational purposes.

However, when they began colliding with pedestrians in the icy lanes, alleyways and roads of St. Moritz, this led to the invention of "steering means" for the sleds. The basic bobsleigh (bobsled) consisted of two crestas (skeleton sleds) attached together with a board that had a steering mechanism at the front. The ability to steer meant the sleds could make longer runs through the town. Longer runs also meant higher speeds on curves. Local sentiment about these informal competitions varied, but eventually complaints grew so vociferous that Badrutt had to do something. His solution, in the late 1870s, was to build a basic natural-ice run for his guests outside the town near the small hamlet named Cresta. He took action because he did not want to make enemies in the town, and he had worked hard and invested a lot of time and money in popularizing wintering in St. Moritz, so he was not going to let boredom induce customers not to visit the area.

=== Competitive discipline ===
Formal competitions began down the natural-ice Cresta Run in 1884, which was built in an annual partnership between guests and local people. The run, which was still in operation as of 2026, has served as a host track for skeleton at two Winter Olympic Games (1928 and 1948). As one of the few natural weather tracks in the world, it does not use artificial refrigeration. It is not known how much the original track evolved in the early years as the three sports matured and stabilized. The first club was formed in 1897, and the first purpose-built track solely for bobsleds opened in 1902 outside St. Moritz. Over the years, bobsleigh tracks evolved from straight runs to twisting and turning tracks. The original wooden sleds gave way to streamlined fiberglass and metal ones.

The International Bobsleigh and Skeleton Federation (IBSF) was founded in 1923. Men's four-man bobsleigh appeared in the first ever Winter Olympics in 1924, and the men's two-man bobsleigh event was added in 1932. Though not included in the 1960 Winter Olympics, bobsleigh has featured in every Winter Olympics since. Women's bobsleigh competition began in the US in 1983 with two demonstration races in Lake Placid, New York, one held in February and the second held during the World Cup races in March 1983. Two-woman bobsleigh made its Olympic debut at the 2002 Winter Olympics. Bobsleigh is also contested at American, European, and World Cup championships.

Germany and Switzerland have proven the most successful bobsleighing nations, measured by overall success in European, World, World Cup, and Olympic championships. Since the 1990s Germans have dominated in international competition, having won more medals than any other nation. Italy, Austria, Canada and the United States also have strong bobsleigh traditions.

Bobsleighs can attain speeds of 150 km/h (93 mph), with the reported world record being 157.06 km/h (97.59 mph) set on March 3, 2019 at the Whistler World Championships in 2019.

== Modern era ==
=== Tracks ===
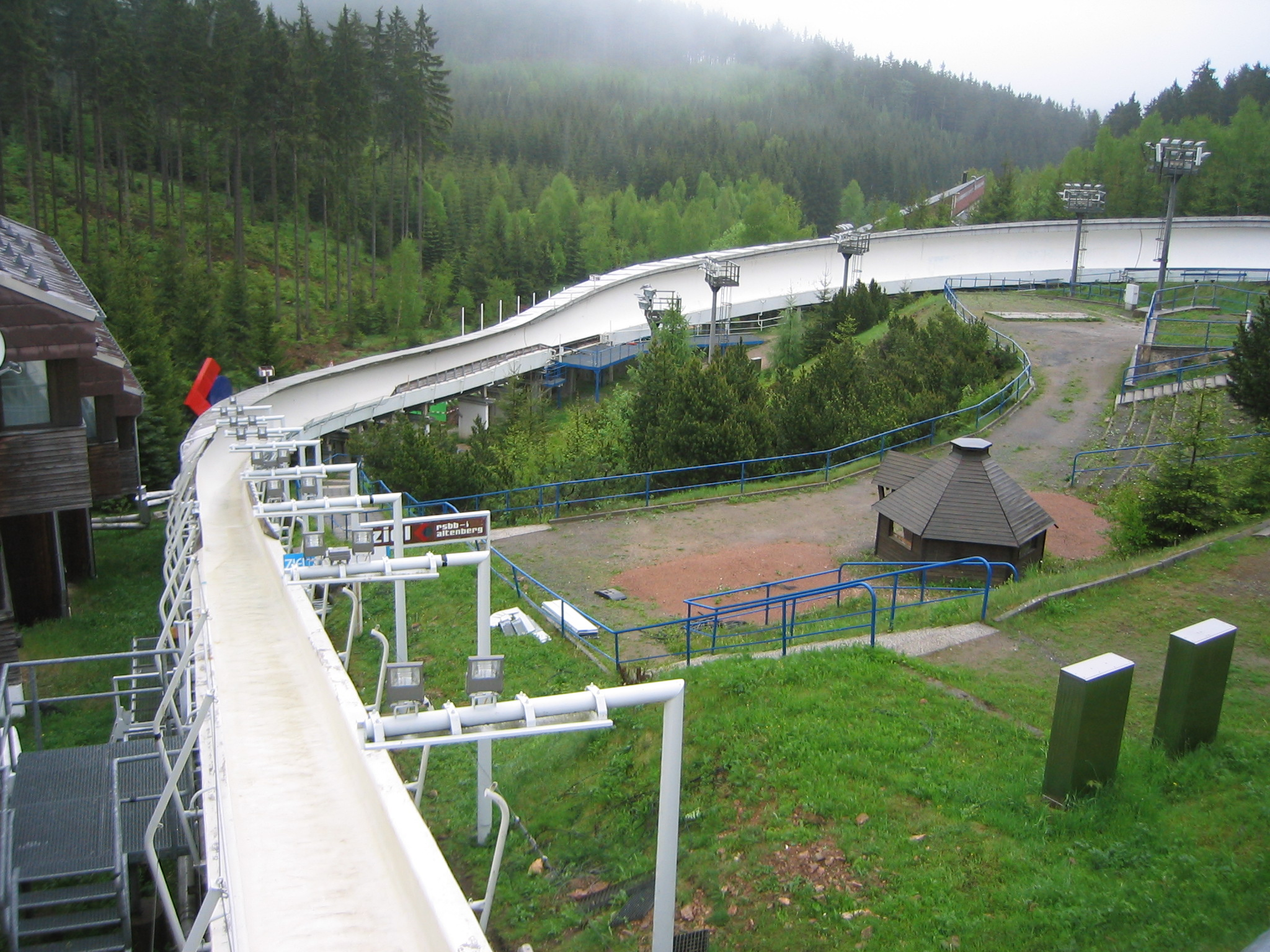
Altenberg track, Germany

Modern tracks are made of concrete, coated with ice. They are required to have at least one straight section and one labyrinth (three turns in quick succession without a straight section). Ideally, a modern track should be 1,200 to 1,300 metres (3,900–4,300 ft) long and have at least fifteen curves. Speeds may exceed 120 kilometres per hour (75 mph), and some curves can subject the crews to as much as 5 g.

Some bobsleigh tracks are also used for luge and skeleton competition.

Some tracks offer tourists rides in bobsleighs, including those at Sigulda, Latvia; Innsbruck-Igls, Austria; Whistler, British Columbia, Canada; Lillehammer, Norway; Lake Placid, US; Salt Lake City, Utah, US; and La Plagne, France.

=== Sleighs and crews ===
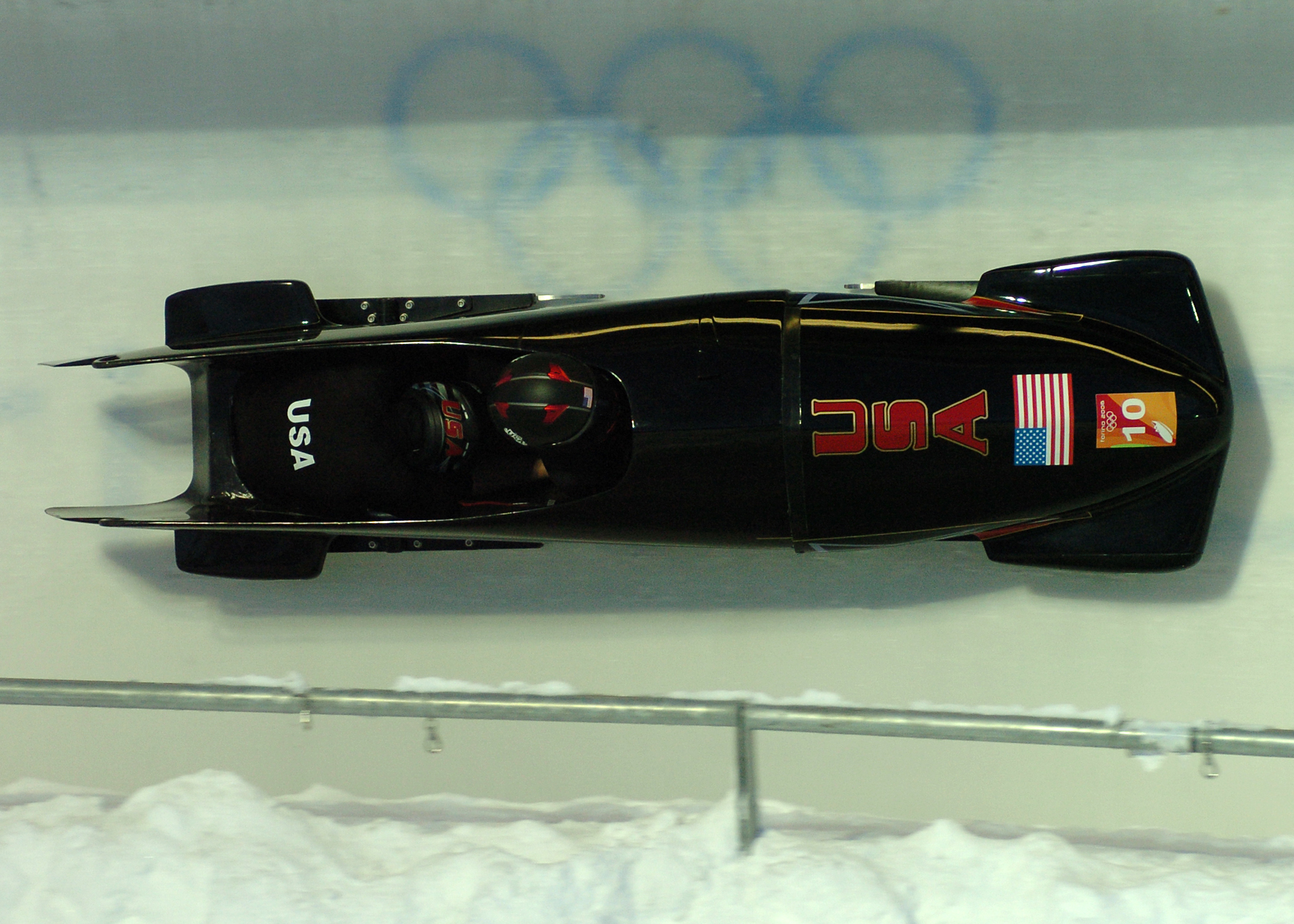
Team USA on a wall, Shauna Rohbock (pilot) and Valerie Fleming (brakes) during their 2006 silver run on Cesana Pariol, Italy

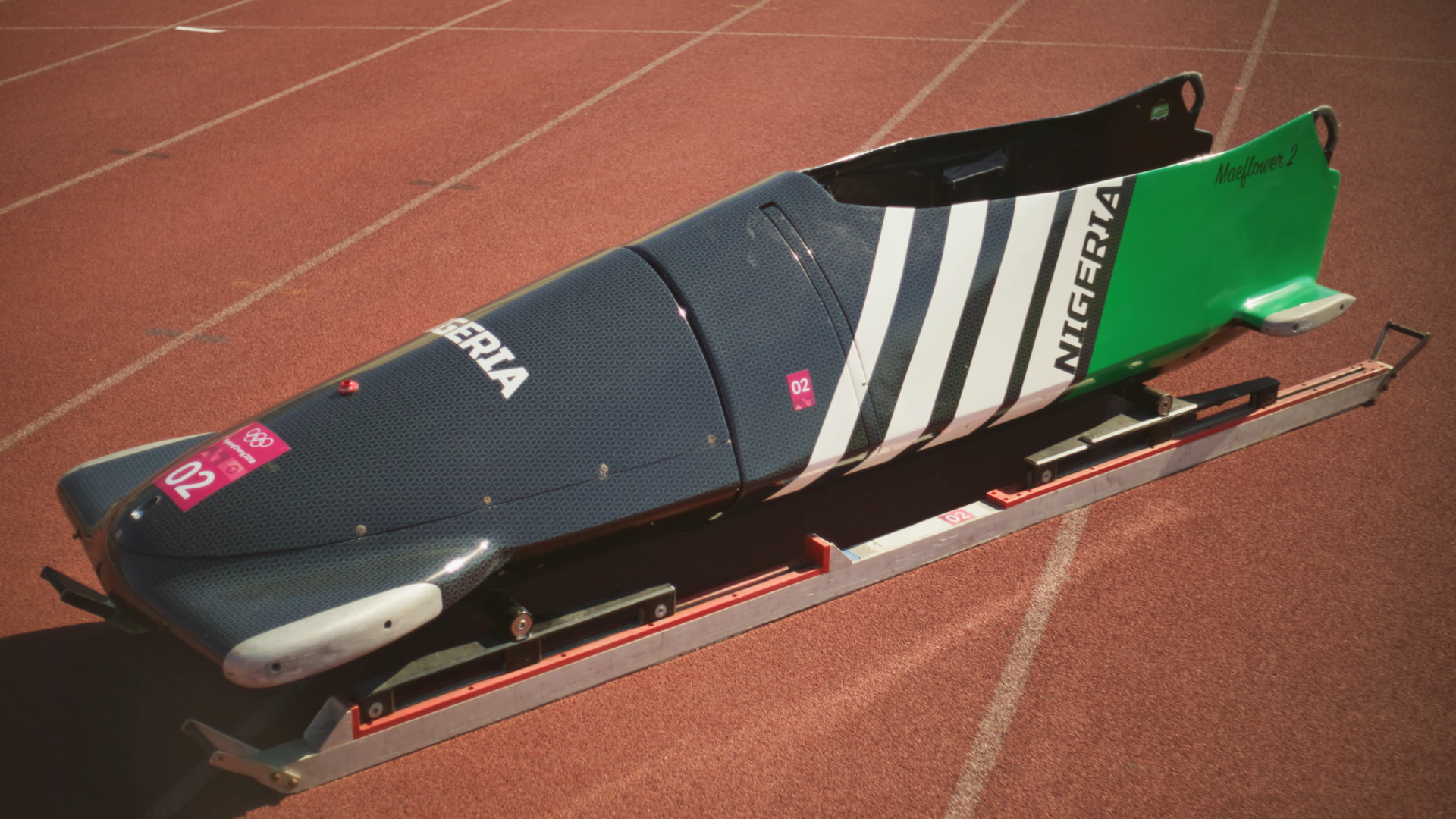
Maeflower 2, a bobsleigh used by the Nigerian team

Modern-day sleighs combine light metals, steel runners, and an aerodynamic composite body. Competition sleighs must be not more than 3.80 metres (12.5 ft) long (4-crew) or 2.70 metres (8.9 ft) long (2-crew). The runners on both are set at 0.67 metres (2.2 ft) gauge. Until the weight-limit rule was added in 1952, bobsleigh crews tended to be very heavy to ensure the greatest possible speed. Nowadays the maximum weight, including crew, is 630 kilograms (1,390 lb) (4-man), 390 kilograms (860 lb) (2-man), or 340 kilograms (750 lb) (2-woman), which can be reached via the addition of metal weights. The bobsleighs themselves are designed to be as light as possible to allow dynamic positioning of mass through the turns of the bobsleigh course.

Although bobsleighs once were ridden by five or six, crews were reduced in the 1930s to either two or four people. The four-person crew consists of a pilot, a brakeman, and two pushers. Athletes are selected for their speed and strength, which are necessary to push the sleigh to a competitive speed at the start of the race. Pilots must have the skill, timing, and finesse to steer the sleigh along the path, or "line", that will produce the greatest speed.

In modern bobsleighs, the steering system consists of two metal rings that actuate a pulley system located in the forward cowling that turns the front runners. For example, to turn left, the pilot would pull the left ring. Only subtle steering adjustments are necessary to guide the sled; at speeds up to 80 miles per hour (130 km/h), anything larger would cause a crash. The pilot does most of the steering, and the brakeman stops the sled after crossing the finish line by pulling the sled's brake lever.

Women compete in women's bobsleigh (which is always two-woman) and men in both two- and four-man competitions. Women were confirmed as being able to compete in any four-"man" bobsleigh event from 25 September 2014, either as part of a mixed-sex team or an all-female team. However, because women are on average lighter than men (and thus at a competitive disadvantage in a gravity sport), and because most sliding nations have fewer women able to compete than men, this option has not proved popular with teams.

=== Monobob ===
A single-person bobsleigh is called a "monobob". Single-person sleds were introduced into international competition for both adaptive bobsleigh (for athletes who are able to drive a sled but not push) and as a youth sport (for younger athletes who have not yet developed the ability to push a heavy two- or four-person sled). After the 2018 Winter Olympics, the International Olympic Committee and the IBSF agreed to add women's monobob as an Olympic sport for the 2022 Winter Olympics, so that there would be an equal number of women's and men's events in bobsleigh.

Prior to the 2020–21 competitive season, monobobs were traditionally constructed on one-piece chassis. Starting with the 2020–21 season, competitors in IBSF-sanctioned races must use articulated (two-section) monobobs manufactured by the IBSF's sole source sled builder, iXent. The sled must weigh a minimum of 162 kg (357 lb) without the athlete (but including timing equipment and any ballast weights) and a maximum of 247 kg (545 lb) including the athlete; runners are the same as for two-person bobsleighs. This implies a maximum athlete weight limit of 85 kg (187 lb).

=== Racing ===
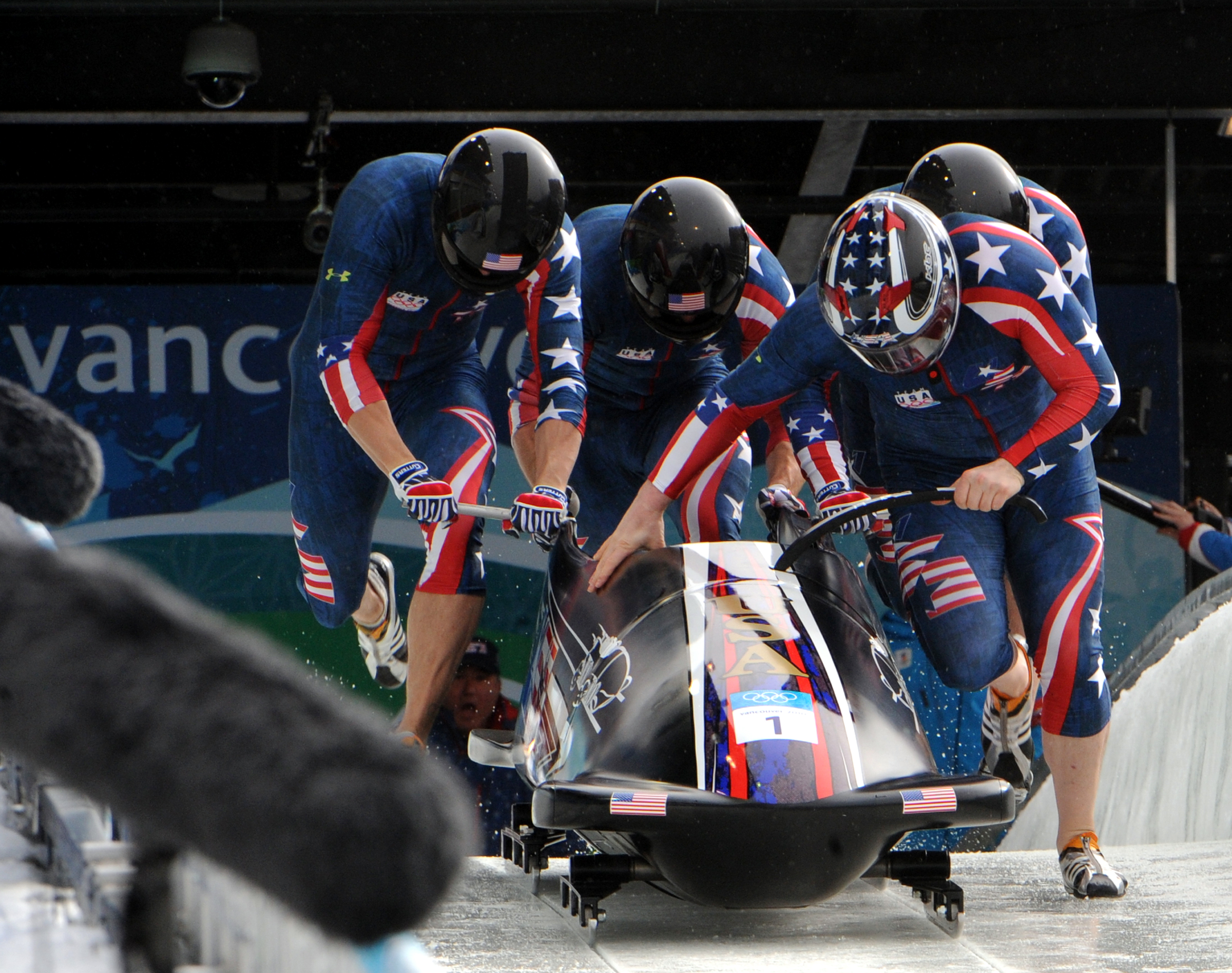
USA-1 in heat 3 of 4-man bobsleigh at 2010 Winter Olympics, 27 February 2010

Individual runs down the course, or "heats", begin from a standing start, with the crew pushing the sled for up to 50 metres (160 ft) before boarding; though the pilot does not steer, grooves in the ice make steering unnecessary until the sled leaves the starting area. While poor form during the initial push can lose a team the heat, it is otherwise rarely, if ever, decisive. Over the rest of the course, a sleigh's speed depends on its weight, aerodynamics, runners, the condition of the ice, and the skill of the pilot.

Race times are recorded in hundredths of seconds, so even seemingly minor errors – especially those at the beginning, which affect the remainder of the heat – can have a measurable impact on the final race standings.

The men's and women's standings for normal races are calculated over the aggregate of two runs or heats. At the Olympic Winter Games and World Championships, all competitions (for both men and women) consist of four heats.

== Olympic medal table ==
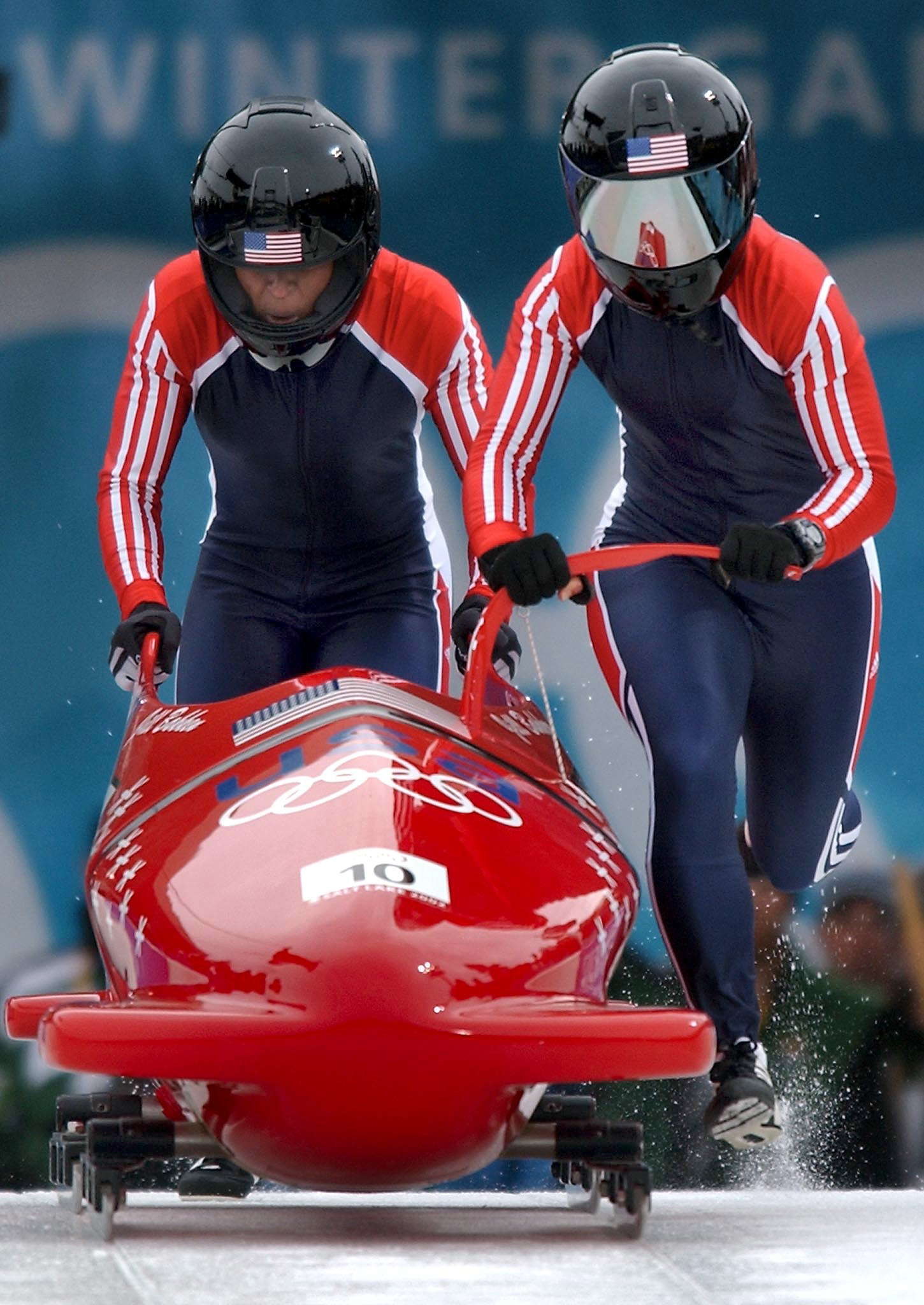
Vonetta Flowers (left) and Jill Bakken power up in the push zone for their 80-mile-per-hour (130 km/h) ride down the Winter Olympic bobsledding track. Bakken, the driver, and Flowers, the brakeman, won the first gold medal presented in Olympic women's bobsledding (2002).

== Safety ==
=== Brain trauma ===
Sledding at a competitive level involves sledders repeatedly subjecting themselves to high-G forces and multiple small collisions of their head into their helmet as sharp turns are taken. Additionally, when mistakes happen and the sled crashes, there are no "seatbelts" or other protections; the sledders can simply be falling down the course at high speed with their helmet grinding along the surface or bouncing off the interior of the sled. One sledder described his experience during crashes as being equivalent to his head being inside a jet engine. Even ignoring crashes, repetitive shaking from small imperfections in the course is hypothesized to cause small tears in the brain, especially if performed repeatedly. The culture of competitive bobsledders (especially before this danger was recognized) also made injured participants hesitant to speak up and request breaks, fearful of being dropped from the team. Bobsledders who train frequently have reported issues such as chronic headaches, a heightened sensitivity to bright lights and loud noises, forgetfulness, a "mental fog", and psychological problems. Repeated mild brain trauma has caused issues for boxers, rugby players, and football players with chronic traumatic encephalopathy, and fears have arisen that bobsledding carries a similar danger, at least with the steeper and faster courses used in competitions. A brain scan of one bobsledder, Christina Smith, revealed damage to the rear and frontal lobes, consistent with micro-tears in the brain's white matter.

A significant number of athletes have either died by suicide or died of drug overdoses. Examples include medal-winning bobsledders Eugenio Monti and Pavle Jovanovic, who died by suicide; Steven Holcomb died of an overdose. Since 2013, three North American former bobsledders have taken their lives, another attempted it, and two others died of overdoses; this is far over expectation of the group from chance, as only a few hundred athletes participate seriously in bobsled and other sliding sports such as luge and skeleton at any one time.

=== Fatal incidents ===
No	Competitor	Year	Track	Section	Race	Event	Vehicle
	(Netherlands) Jules van Bylandt	1907	(Switzerland) Cresta Run		Practice run		skeleton
	Oberüberl	1911			Practice run		5-man sled
	(Germany) Karl Gerloff	1933	(Germany) Oberhof		Practice run		4-man sled
	(Germany) Rudolf Gerloff	1933	(Germany) Oberhof		Practice run		4-man sled
	(Switzerland) Reto Capadrutt	1939	(Italy) Cortina d'Ampezzo		Practice run	World Championships 1939	4-man sled
	(Belgium) Max Houben	1949	(United States) Lake Placid	Shady corner	Practice run	World Championships 1949	2-man sled
	(Romania) Alexandru Budișteanu	1951	(Romania) Poiana Brașov	penultimate turn of the track		World University Winter Games 1951	4-man sled
	(Switzerland) Felix Endrich	1953	(Germany) Garmisch-Partenkirchen	Bayernkurve	Practice run	World Championships 1953	4-man sled
	(Liechtenstein) Moritz Heidegger	1956	(Switzerland) St. Moritz-Celerina				2-man sled
	(Italy) Sergio Zardini	1966	(United States) Lake Placid	Zig-Zag Curves	Practice run		4-man sled
	(Germany) Toni Pensperger	1966	(Italy) Cortina d'Ampezzo		Practice run	World Championships 1966	4-man sled
	(Austria) Josef Schnellneger	1970	(Germany) Königssee		Practice run	Austria-Cup	2-man sled
	(Italy) Andrea Clemente	1970	(Italy) Cervinia	Finish	2nd heat	Italy Bob Championship	4-man sled
	(Spain) Luis López	1971	(Italy) Cervinia		Practice run	World Championships 1971	2-man sled
	(Italy) Giuseppe Soravia	1980	(Austria) Igls	Finish	Practice run		4-man sled
	(United States) James Morgan	1981	(Italy) Cortina d'Ampezzo	Finish	3rd heat	World Championships 1981	4-man sled
	(Soviet Union) Imants Karlsons	1982	(Austria) Igls		Training session	Training	2-man sled
	(Romania) Daniel Oaida	1989	(Germany) Altenberg	Curve 4	Training session	Training	4-man sled
41	(Germany) Peter Förster	1990	(Germany) Altenberg	Finish	Training session	Training	2-man sled
42	(Germany) Yvonne Cernota	2004	(Germany) Königssee	Echowand	Training session	Training	2-woman sled

== See also ==
- Luge
- Cool Runnings
- List of Bobsleigh World Cup champions
