= Badrutt's Palace Hotel =

Hotel in St. Moritz, Switzerland

Coordinates: 46.497°N 9.841°E

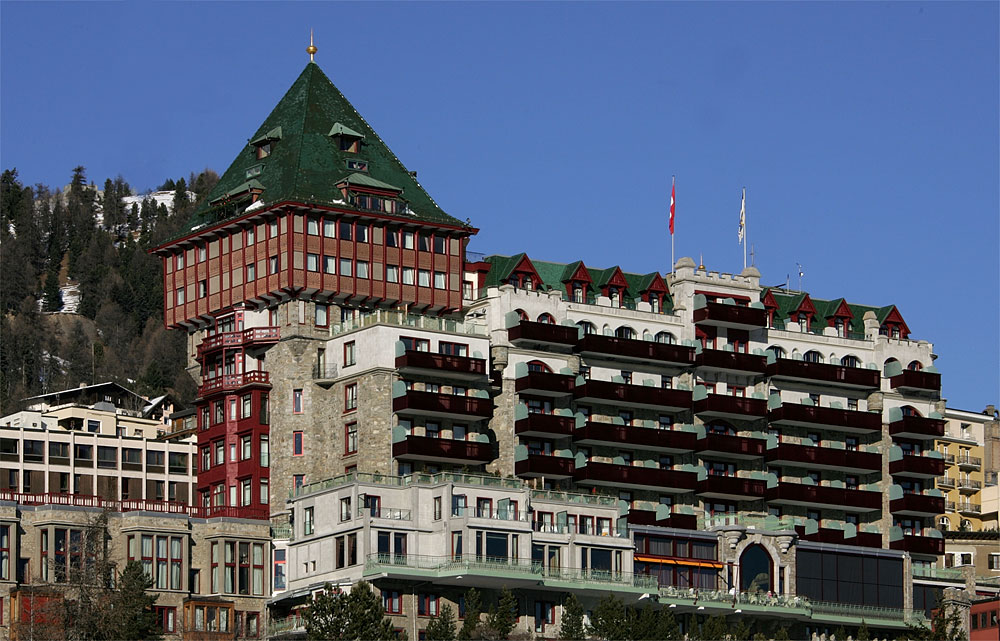

General information
- Type: Luxury hotel
- Location: St. Moritz, Switzerland, Via Serlas 27
- Named for: Caspar Badrutt
- Opened: 1896; 130 years ago
- Owner: Hans Wiedemann (66.67%)
- Affiliation: The Leading Hotels of the World

Design and construction
- Architects: Chiodera & Tschudy

Other information
- Number of rooms: 112
- Number of suites: 43
- Number of restaurants: 8
- Number of bars: 2

Website
- badruttspalace.com

Badrutt's Palace Hotel AG, commonly known as Badrutt's Palace, is a luxury hotel and resort in St. Moritz, Switzerland. Opened in 1896, the hotel has 163 rooms and 47 suites, as well as eleven restaurants, two bars, a shopping center and spa area. In 2006, Hansjürg and Anikó Badrutt, sole owners of the hotel, bequeathed two thirds of the shares to Hans Wiedemann, who had taken over as the hotel's director in 2004.

== History ==
The Badrutt family's origins in the hospitality industry can be traced back to 1856, when Johannes Badrutt bought a small guesthouse in St. Moritz and started to rebuild it to create the Hotel Engadiner Kulm, which is known today as the Kulm Hotel St. Moritz.

He had built an artificial coasting slide and a curling ground for his guests. In 1864, Johannes Badrutt's second son, Caspar Badrutt, bought the Hotel Beau Rivage in St. Moritz and subsequently altered it to create Badrutt's Palace Hotel. The official opening was in 1896, and Caspar Badrutt's son Hans took over the management in 1904.

Billy Fiske, an American fighter pilot killed in the Battle of Britain, was a Cresta Run competitor. A founder of the Aspen ski resort in Colorado, he was well known for jumps from the Badrutt's Palace Hotel's bar chandelier.

A historic house known as Chesa Veglia was purchased in 1935–36 and converted into a restaurant. With the death of Hans Badrutt in 1953, the directorship passed to his wife Helen and son Andrea Badrutt, who later took over (along with his brother Hansjürg).

The historic tower and symbol of St. Moritz was rebuilt and refurbished after a fire in 1967. A swimming pool and a fitness center were added to the hotel in 1969–70. After the extension of the Suot-Mulin-Complex between 1981 and 1984, which housed new suites and privately owned apartments, the management of Badrutt's Palace was transferred to the Rosewood Hotels & Resorts luxury hotel chain.

During this period, many renovations, extensions and technical installations were made that added to the substance and development of the hotel. In the year 2000, a new spa area and fitness center opened. In 2002, the Serletta Shopping Center, with international stores, opened beneath the hotel, and this was later renamed the Palace Galerie. In 2003, the 280 square metres (3,000 sq ft) Hans Badrutt suite was completed, as was the 250 square metres (2,700 sq ft) Helen Badrutt suite with marble bathrooms.

Since the retreat of the Rosewood group in April 2003, Badrutt's Palace is being run as a private hotel again. In 2004, Swiss hotelier Hans Wiedemann took over as managing director, together with Yves Gardiol as general manager. In 2006 (notarially 2008), the childless owners, Hansjürg and Anikó Badrutt (born 1930), bequeathed a two-thirds share of the hotel to Hans Wiedemann in their wills.

As of 2016, Richard Leuenberger has taken over the position of Managing Director, successfully overseeing comprehensive rooms renovations and adding services and restaurants to the offering. The hotel saw a substantial increase in overall performance between 2016 and 2023, despite COVID, making the hotel a market leader in revenues and profitability. The hotel was listed on The World's 50 Best Hotels, and it has received other significant awards such as the Forbes 5 Star Award.

== See also ==
- List of hotels in Switzerland
- Tourism in Switzerland
