= Pagig =

- Former municipality
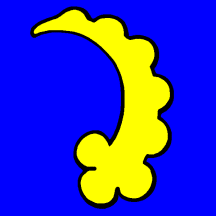
- Flag Coat of arms
- Location of Pagig
- Location within Switzerland Location within Canton of Graubünden
- Coordinates: 46°50′N 9°38′E
- Country: Switzerland
- Canton: Graubünden
- District: Plessur

Area
  - Total: 5.24 km^{2} (2.02 sq mi)
- Elevation: 1,319 m (4,327 ft)

Population (December 2007)
  - Total: 63
  - Density: 12/km^{2} (31/sq mi)
- Time zone: UTC+01:00 (CET)
  - Summer (DST): UTC+02:00 (CEST)
- Postal code: 7028
- SFOS number: 3928
- ISO 3166 code: CH-GR
- Website: SFSO statistics

Pagig is a village in the district of Plessur in the canton of Graubünden, Switzerland. An independent municipality before, it merged on January 1, 2008 with neighboring St. Peter to form the municipality of St. Peter-Pagig.

== History ==
Pagig is first mentioned in 1160 as de Puigo. Formerly, in Romansh, it was known as Pagiai.

== Geography ==
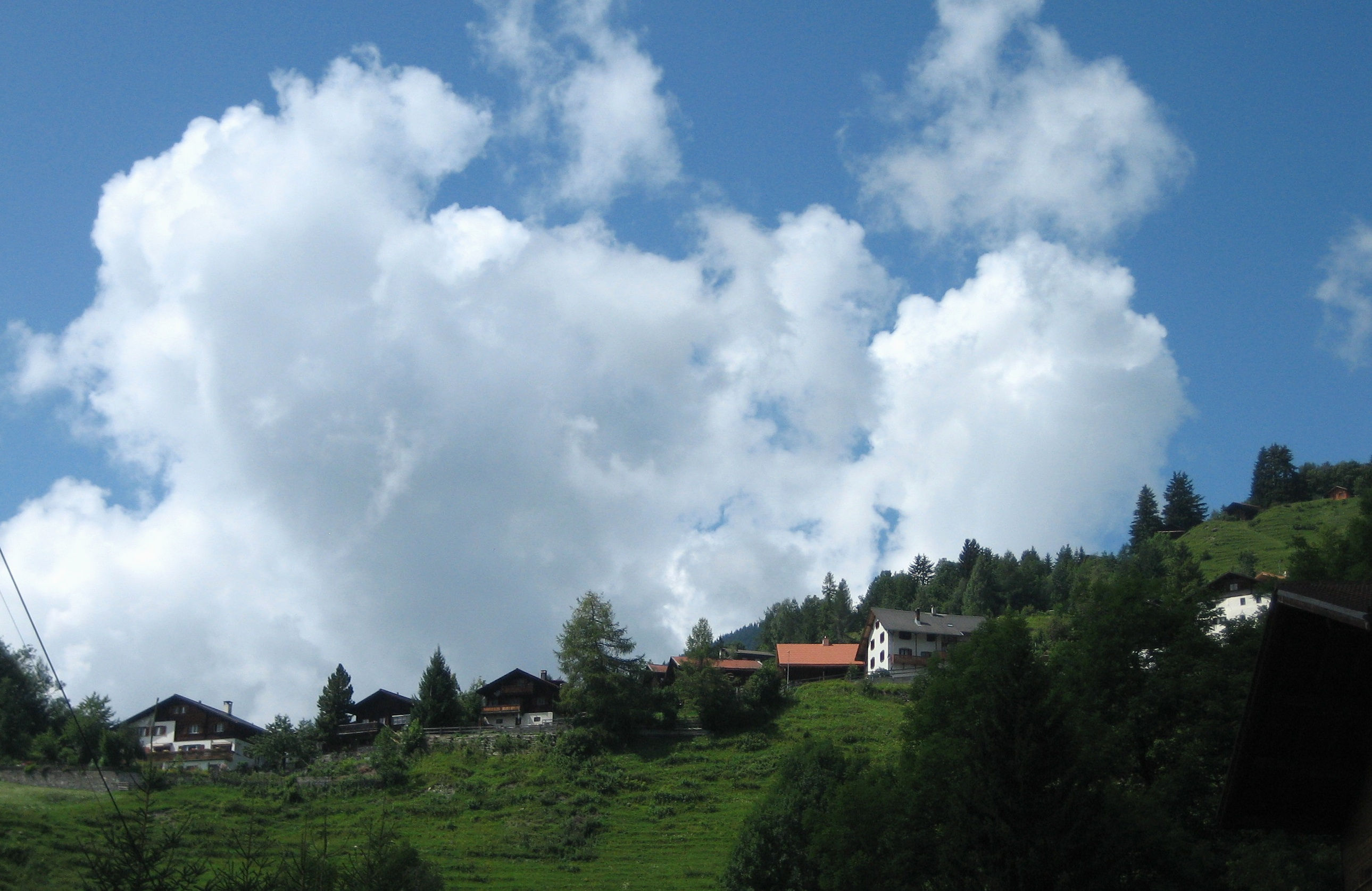
Pagig village

Pagig has an area, as of 2006, of 5.2 km^{2} (2.0 sq mi). Of this area, 58.2% is used for agricultural purposes, while 31.5% is forested. Of the rest of the land, 2.3% is settled (buildings or roads) and the remainder (8%) is non-productive (rivers, glaciers or mountains).

The village is located in the Schanfigg sub-district of the Plessur district on the northern side of the mid-Schanfigg.

== Demographics ==
Pagig has a population (as of 2007) of 63, of which 9.5% are foreign nationals. Over the last 10 years the population has decreased at a rate of -23.2%. All of the population (as of 2000) speaks German.

As of 2000, the gender distribution of the population was 61.9% male and 38.1% female. The age distribution, as of 2000, in Pagig is; 4 children or 5.1% of the population are between 0 and 9 years old and 17 teenagers or 21.8% are between 10 and 19. Of the adult population, 5 people or 6.4% of the population are between 20 and 29 years old. 7 people or 9.0% are between 30 and 39, 9 people or 11.5% are between 40 and 49, and 12 people or 15.4% are between 50 and 59. The senior population distribution is 10 people or 12.8% of the population are between 60 and 69 years old, 5 people or 6.4% are between 70 and 79, there are 9 people or 11.5% who are between 80 and 89.

In the 2007 federal election the most popular party was the SVP which received 57.1% of the vote. The next three most popular parties were the SP (20.6%), the FDP (14.1%) and the CVP (8.2%).

The entire Swiss population is generally well educated. In Pagig about 55.5% of the population (between age 25-64) have completed either non-mandatory upper secondary education or additional higher education (either University or a Fachhochschule).

Pagig has an unemployment rate of 0.63%. As of 2005, there were 12 people employed in the primary economic sector and about 4 businesses involved in this sector. 1 person is employed in the secondary sector and there is 1 business in this sector. 2 people are employed in the tertiary sector, with 1 business in this sector.

The historical population is given in the following table:

year	population
1808	75
1900	88
1950	79
1970	43
2000	78
2007	63
