= Caspar Badrutt =

Swiss businessman, hotelier and restaurateur

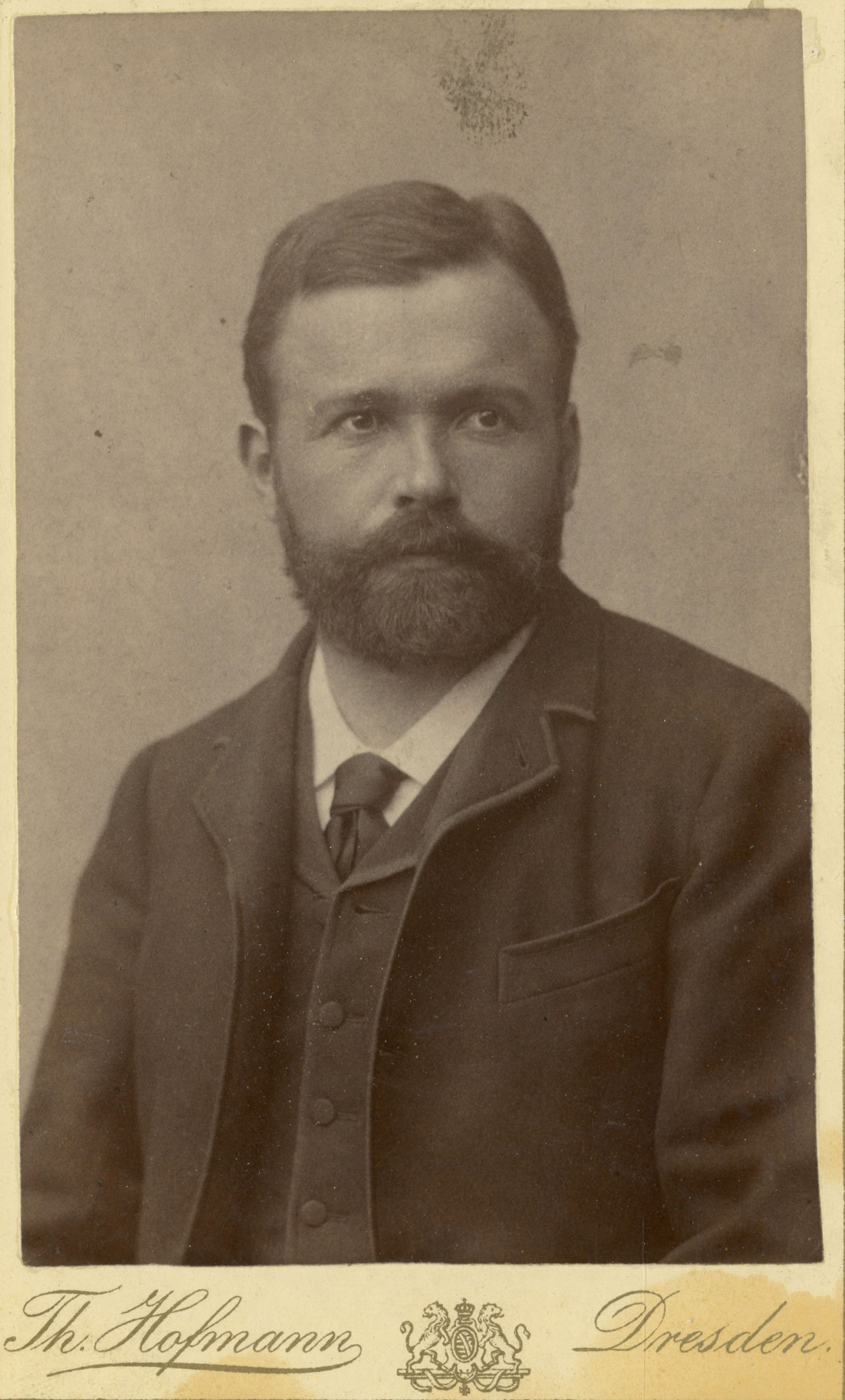
- Badrutt around 1900
- Born: July 21, 1848; Samedan, Grisons, Switzerland
- Died: June 28, 1904 (aged 55); St. Moritz, Grisons, Switzerland
- Occupations: Businessman; hotelier; restaurateur; tourism pioneer
- Known for: Founding and leading Badrutt's Palace Hotel
- Spouse: Ursulina Cadisch (m. 1873)
- Children: 4

Caspar Badrutt (July 21, 1848 – June 28, 1904) was a Swiss businessman, hotelier and restaurateur. He was the founder and proprietor of the famous Badrutt's Palace Hotel in St. Moritz, Switzerland. Badrutt was almost solely responsible for developing the village into an international skiing destination.

== Early life ==
Badrutt was born in Samedan on July 21, 1848, as the second son of Johannes Badrutt and his wife Maria (née Berry). His younger brother, Peter Robert Badrutt (1850–1907), became a serial businessman and Grand Councilor of Grisons from 1897 to 1898 (Liberals).

== Career ==
He initially worked at his father's hotel, the Hotel Engadiner Kulm, before founding Badrutt's Palace in 1896.

St. Moritz in the 19th century was known as a summer mineral spa town where the rich and royal took mineral cures during the months of May through September. However, Caspar's father, Johannes Badrutt, was discontent with having two thirds of the year without guests.

So, at the end of one season, Johannes Badrutt challenged some of his well-to-do English regulars to a bet – he would give them lodging for free if they found the locale inhospitable and uninteresting during a lengthy winter stay. Otherwise, if he won their satisfaction, the guests would have to talk up the experience amongst their acquaintances for all of the following year. The men were well connected among the aristocracy of the day, including many scions of royal lines and other European nobles.

Almost overnight, wintering in St Moritz at Badrutt's Kulm hotel became the rage, and increased crowding led to a search for diversions. Beginning in the 1870s, some Englishmen adapted a type of delivery sled for daring dashes down the twisting narrow streets of St. Moritz. Subsequently, other tourists wanted a Victorian ride, and larger steerable devices were contrived – the early luge/skeleton individual sleds, and the bobsleigh (or bobsled).

Careening around the town's streets became increasingly popular, but the incidence and frequency of pedestrian collisions and risk to life grew proportionately. Therefore, Caspar Badrutt stepped in and created the first purpose-built half-pipe track, now familiar from the Winter Olympic Games. This track later became the model for the Cresta Run skeleton racing track, built in 1884.

== Personal life ==
In 1873, Badrutt married Ursulina Cadisch (1850–1905), originally from Celerina/Schlarigna.

They had four children:

- Caspar, Jr. (1875–1941)
- Johann Eduard Leon "Hans" Badrutt (1876–1953), married firstly to Amalia Ganzoni (died 1912), two sons and a daughter; married secondly to Helene Kolb, originally from St. Gallen; they had another two sons.
- Victorina Badrutt (1878–1912), married to Albert Knaus, a physician of Bassersdorf, three children.
- Martina Badrutt (1881–1925), never married.

He died in St. Moritz on June 28, 1904, after suffering a stroke.
