= St. Moritz =

Municipality in Grisons, Switzerland

- Municipality
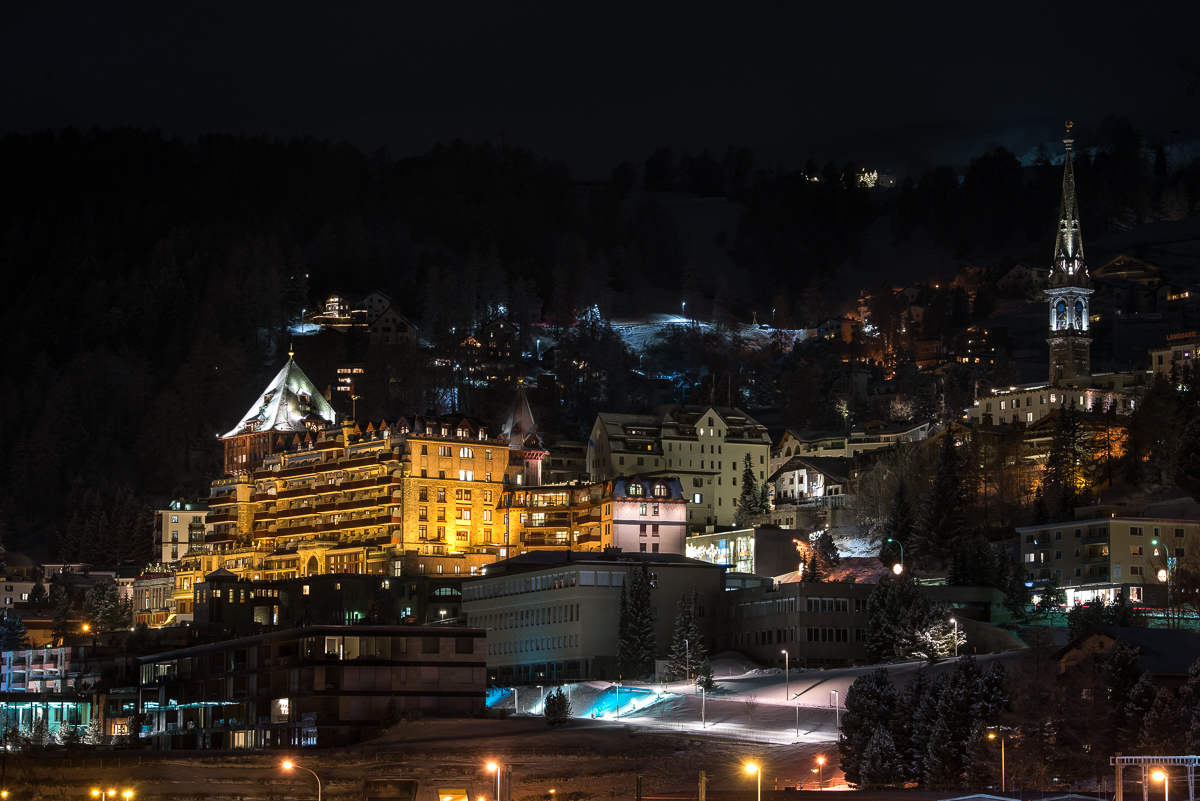
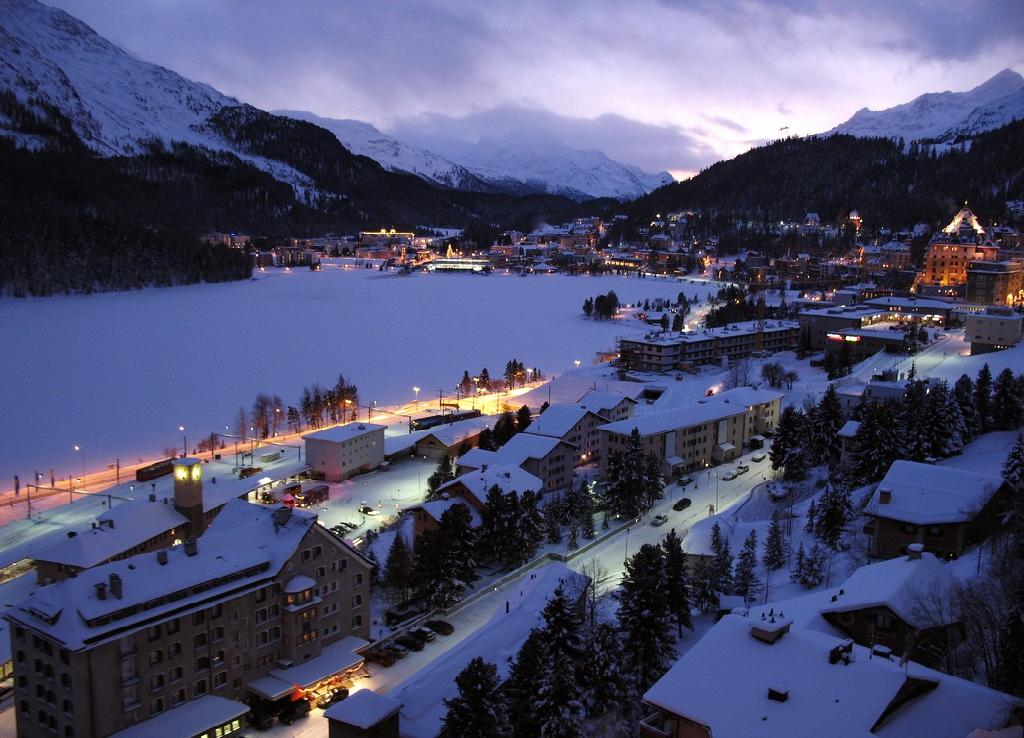
- Winter night in St. Moritz St. Moritz on an evening in February 2009, with the frozen lake

- Flag Coat of arms
- Location of St. Moritz
- Location within Switzerland Location within Canton of Grisons
- Coordinates: 46°29′50″N 9°50′16″E
- Country: Switzerland
- Canton: Grisons
- District: Maloja

Government
  - Mayor: Christian Jott Jenny Ind. (as of 1 January 2019)

Area
  - Total: 28.69 km^{2} (11.08 sq mi)
- Elevation (Traunter Plazzas): 1,822 m (5,978 ft)

Population (December 2020)
  - Total: 4,945
  - Density: 172.4/km^{2} (446.4/sq mi)
- Demonym: German: St. Moritzer(in)
- Time zone: UTC+01:00 (CET)
  - Summer (DST): UTC+02:00 (CEST)
- Postal code: 7500
- SFOS number: 3787
- ISO 3166 code: CH-GR
- Localities: St. Moritz-Dorf, St. Moritz-Bad, Suvretta, Champfèr (eastern part)
- Surrounded by: Bever, Celerina/Schlarigna, Samedan, Silvaplana
- Website: www.gemeinde-stmoritz.ch

St. Moritz (Note: English: /ˌsæn məˈrɪts/ SAN mə-RITS, US also /ˌseɪnt -/ SAYNT -, UK also /sənt ˈmɒrɪts/ sənt MORR-its; German, in full: Sankt Moritz [zaŋkt moˈrɪts, - ˈmoːrɪts], locally [saŋkt -]; Romansh: San Murezzan [sam muˈʁetsən]; outdated Italian: San Maurizio d'Engadina, now usually replaced by the German name; French: Saint-Moritz.) is a municipality and a high Alpine resort town in the Engadine in Switzerland, at an elevation of about 1,800 metres (5,910 ft) above sea level. It is Upper Engadine's major town and a municipality in the administrative region of Maloja in the Swiss canton of the Grisons.

St. Moritz lies on the southern slopes of the Albula Alps below the Piz Nair (3,056 m or 10,026 ft) overlooking the flat and wide glaciated valley of the Upper Engadine and Lake St. Moritz. It hosted the Winter Olympics in 1928 and 1948.

== History ==
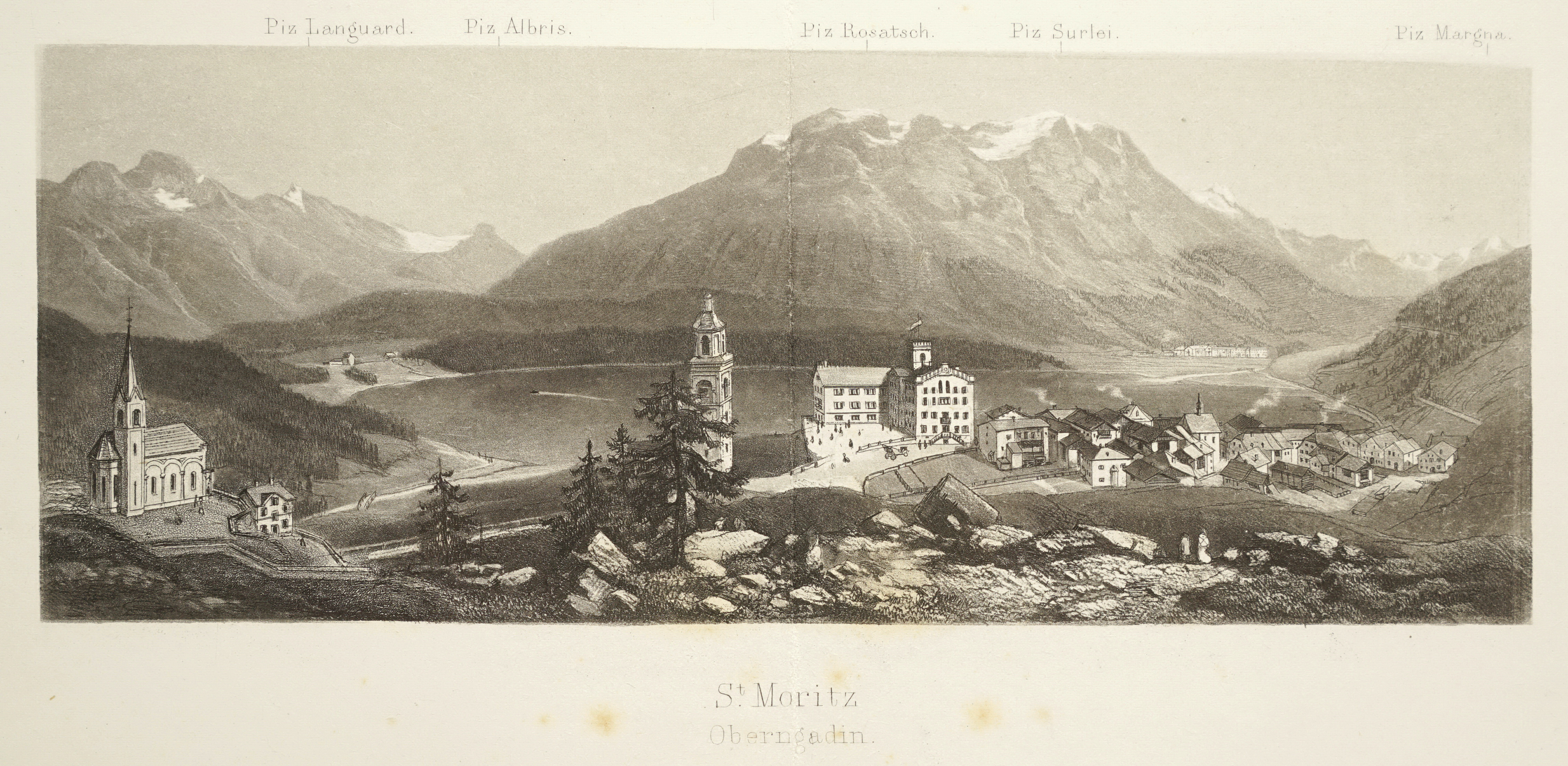
St. Moritz with Kulm Hotel c. 1870. Etching by Heinrich Müller

Votive offerings, swords, and needles from the Bronze Age found at the base of the springs in St. Moritz indicate that the Celts had already discovered them. St. Moritz is first mentioned around 1137–39 as ad sanctum Mauricium. The village was named after Saint Maurice, an early Christian saint from southern Egypt said to have been martyred in the 3rd century by Maximian in Switzerland while serving as leader of the Theban Legion.

Pilgrims traveled to Saint Mauritius, often to the church of the springs, where they drank from the blessed, bubbling waters of the Mauritius springs in the hopes of being healed. In 1519, the Medici pope Leo X promised full absolution to anyone making a pilgrimage to the church of the springs. In the 16th century, the first scientific treatises about the St. Moritz mineral springs were written. In 1535, Paracelsus, the great practitioner of natural remedies, spent some time in St. Moritz.

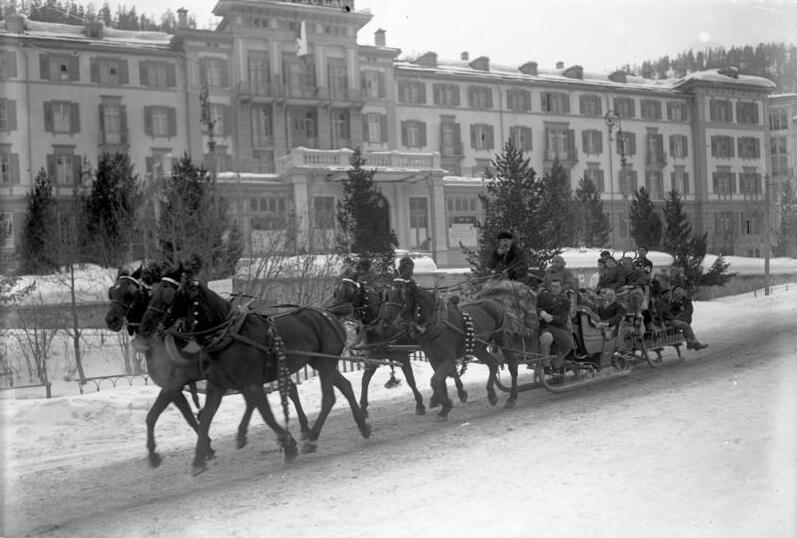
St. Moritz in January 1931

Although it received some visitors during the summer, the origins of the winter resort only date back to September 1864, when St. Moritz hotel pioneer Caspar Badrutt made a wager with four British summer guests: they should return in winter and, if the village was not to their liking, then he would reimburse their travel costs. If they were to find St. Moritz attractive in winter, then he would invite them to stay as his guests for as long as they wished. This marked not only the start of winter tourism in St. Moritz but also the start of winter tourism in the whole of the Alps. The first tourist office in Switzerland was established the same year in the village. St. Moritz developed rapidly in the late nineteenth century; the first electric light in Switzerland was installed in 1878 at the Kulm Hotel, and the first curling tournament on the continent was held in 1880. The first European Ice-Skating Championships were held at St. Moritz in 1882, and the first golf tournament in the Alps was held in 1889. The first bob run and bob race was held in 1890. By 1896, St. Moritz became the first village in the Alps to install electric trams and opened the Palace Hotel. A horse race was held on snow in 1906, and on the frozen lake the following year. The first ski school in Switzerland was established in St. Moritz in 1929.

St. Moritz hosted the 1928 Winter Olympics—the stadium still stands today—and again in 1948. It has hosted over 20 FIBT World Championships, four FIS Alpine World Ski Championships (1934/1974/2003/2017) and over 40 Engadin Skimarathons since 1969. It has also hosted many other events since, including some unlikely ones on the frozen lake in the 1970s and 1980s such as a golf tournament, (1979), a snow polo tournament (held every year in January since 1985) and Cricket on Ice (1989). St. Moritz has also been the venue for many sailing and windsurfing world championships.

Since the early 1980s St. Moritz is also promoted and known as Top of the World. The expression was registered as a trademark by the tourist office in 1987.

== Geography ==
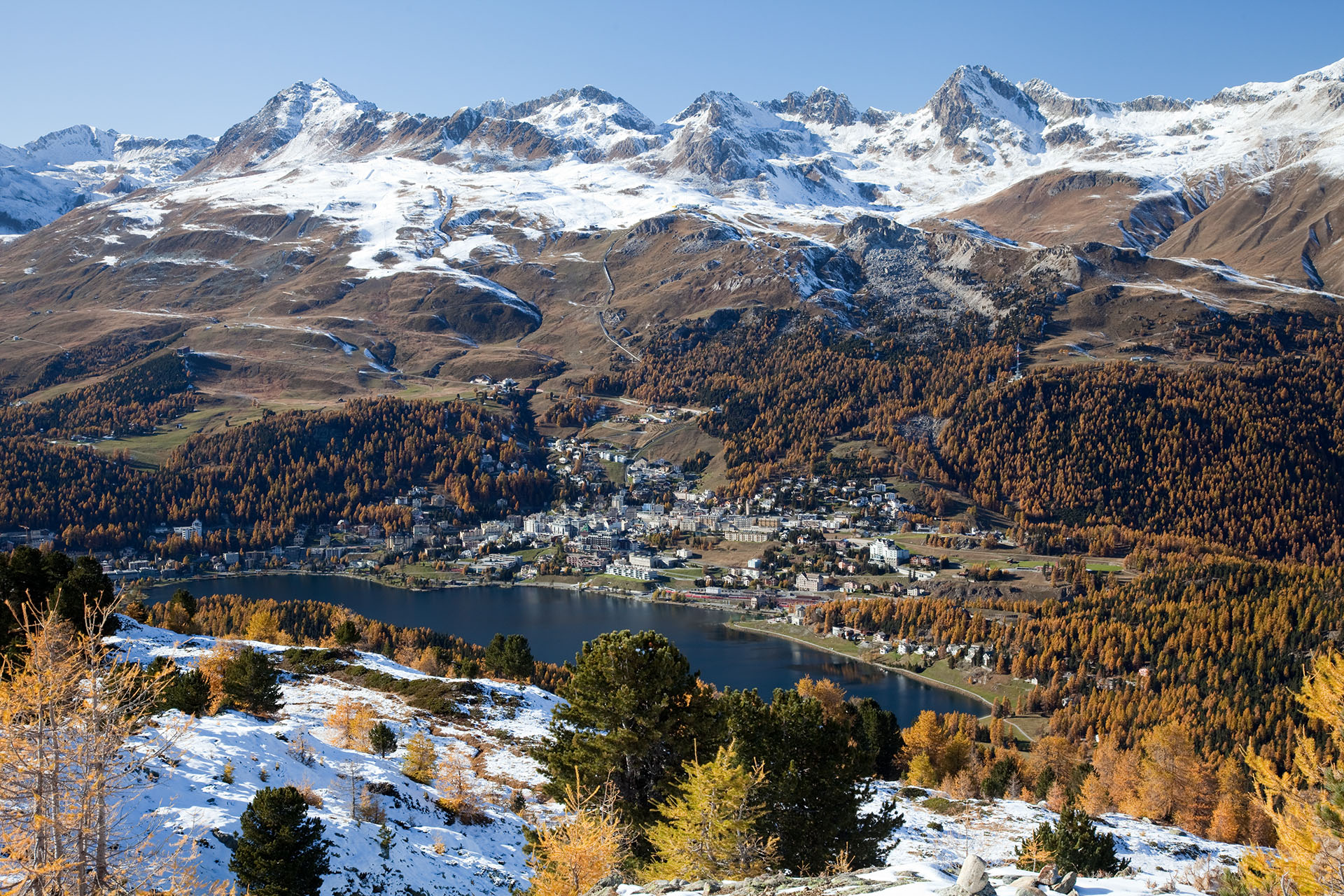
Looking down on St. Moritz

St. Moritz has an area (as of the 2004/09 survey) of 28.69 km^{2} (11.08 sq mi). Of this area, about 26.3% is used for agricultural purposes, while 20.0% is forested. Of the rest of the land, 9.0% is settled (buildings or roads) and 44.8% is unproductive land. In the 2004/09 survey a total of 160 ha (400 acres) or about 5.6% of the total area was covered with buildings, an increase of 23 ha (57 acres) over the 1985 amount. Over the same time period, the amount of recreational space in the municipality increased by 3 ha (7.4 acres) and is now about 1.15% of the total area. Of the agricultural land 149 ha (370 acres) is fields and grasslands, and 643 ha (1,590 acres) consists of alpine grazing areas. Since 1985 the amount of agricultural land has decreased by 37 ha (91 acres). Over the same time period the amount of forested land has increased by 33 ha (82 acres). Rivers and lakes cover 91 ha (220 acres) in the municipality.

The highest summit in the Eastern Alps is Piz Bernina at 4,048.6 m (13,283 ft), located 15 km (9.3 mi) southeast of the village.

Before 2017, the municipality was located in the Oberengadin sub-district of the Maloja district, after 2017 it has become part of the Maloja Region. It consists of the settlements of St. Moritz-Dorf (elev. 1,830 m or 6,005 ft), Bad (1,775 m or 5,825 ft), Champfèr (1,825 m or 5,990 ft), and the village section of Suvretta.

== Sport ==
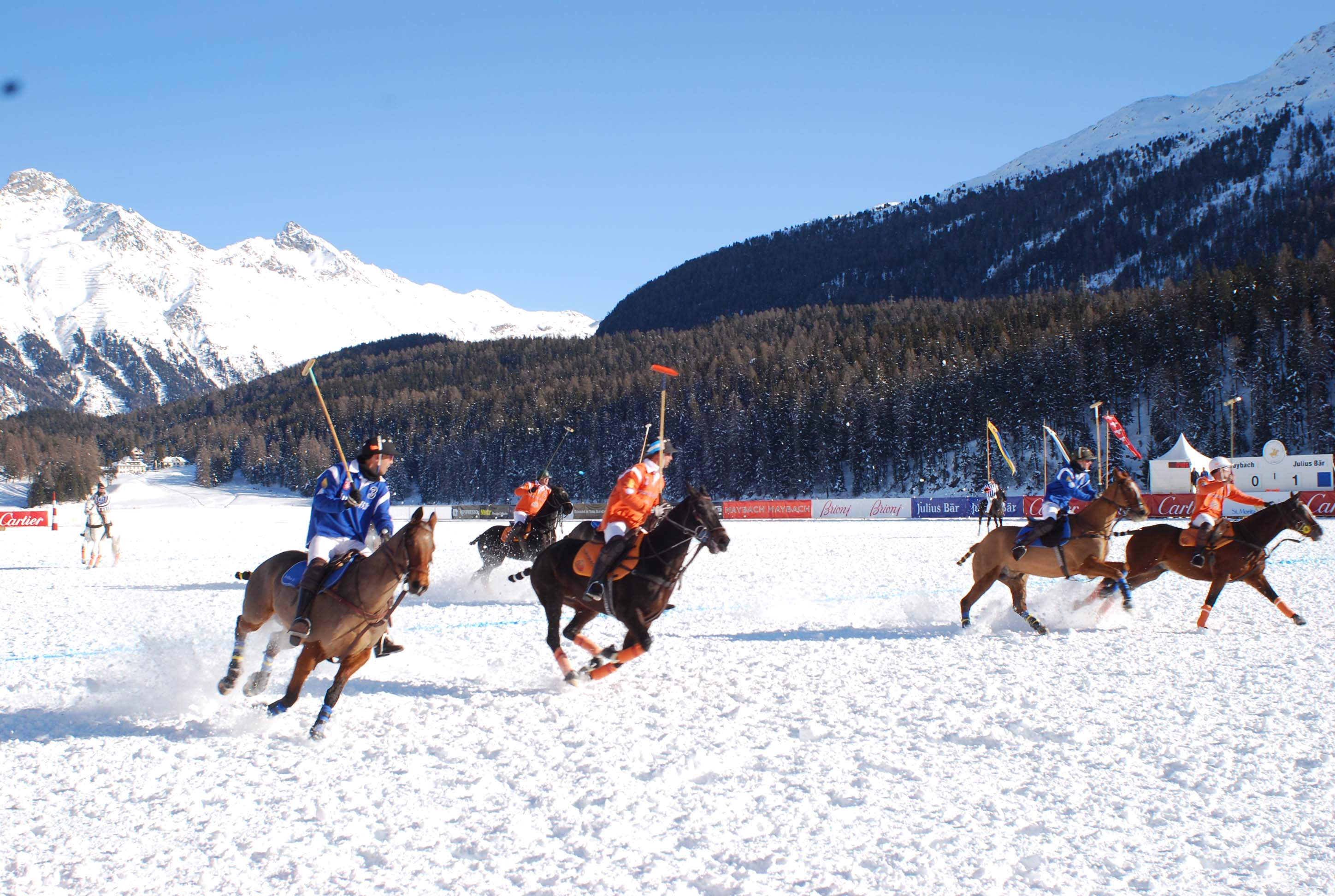
Cartier Polo World Cup 2008

St. Moritz has been a resort for winter sport vacations since the 19th century. Students from the Oxford and Cambridge universities went there to play; the predecessor of the recurring Ice Hockey Varsity Match was a bandy match played in St. Moritz in 1885. St. Moritz was the host city for the Winter Olympic Games in 1928 and 1948, one of four cities to host twice, along with Cortina d’Ampezzo, Innsbruck, and Lake Placid in the United States. It also hosted the FIS Alpine World Ski Championships in 1934, 1974, 2003, and 2017.

Additionally, St. Moritz has hosted the FIBT World Championships (bobsleigh and skeleton racing) a record 21 times. Since 1985, it has hosted Snow Polo St. Moritz, a tournament featuring many of the world's finest teams and played on a specially marked field on the frozen lake.

St. Moritz is extremely popular in the summer months as an altitude training base for distance athletes, particularly cyclists, runners, and race walkers. Its popularity extends to the altitude, weather, world class athletics track, and availability of paths and trails in the area.

In 1904, the oldest and world's last remaining natural bob run was opened. The 1.72 km (1.07 mi) ice channel – also known as the world's biggest "ice sculpture" – is built every winter from the ground up with only snow and water. The bob run hosted numerous world championships and was used in both Olympic Winter Games. In the early 1930s, some members of the bob club started taking guests along for taxi rides; today they run with slightly modified racing bobs.

For the 1928 games, the cross-country skiing and the cross-country skiing part of the Nordic combined events took place around the hills of St. Moritz. Twenty years later, once again the cross-country skiing, the cross-country skiing part of the Nordic combined, and the ice hockey events took place in St. Moritz.

In addition to the above sports, St. Moritz is also well known as a destination for sailing. It is the host venue for the annual St. Moritz Match Race held on lake St. Moritz. The St. Moritz Match Race event is part of the prestigious World Match Racing Tour which covers three continents. The identical supplied (BLU-26) boats are raced two at a time in an on the water dogfight which tests the sailors and skippers to the limits of their physical abilities. Points accrued count towards the World Match Racing Tour and a place in the final event, with the overall winner taking the title ISAF World Match Racing Tour Champion.

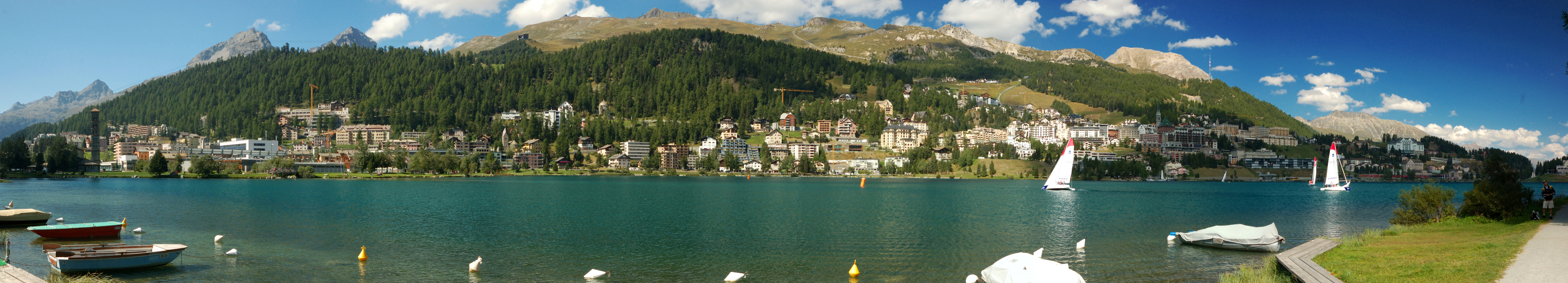
Sailing on Lake St. Moritz

== Tourism ==
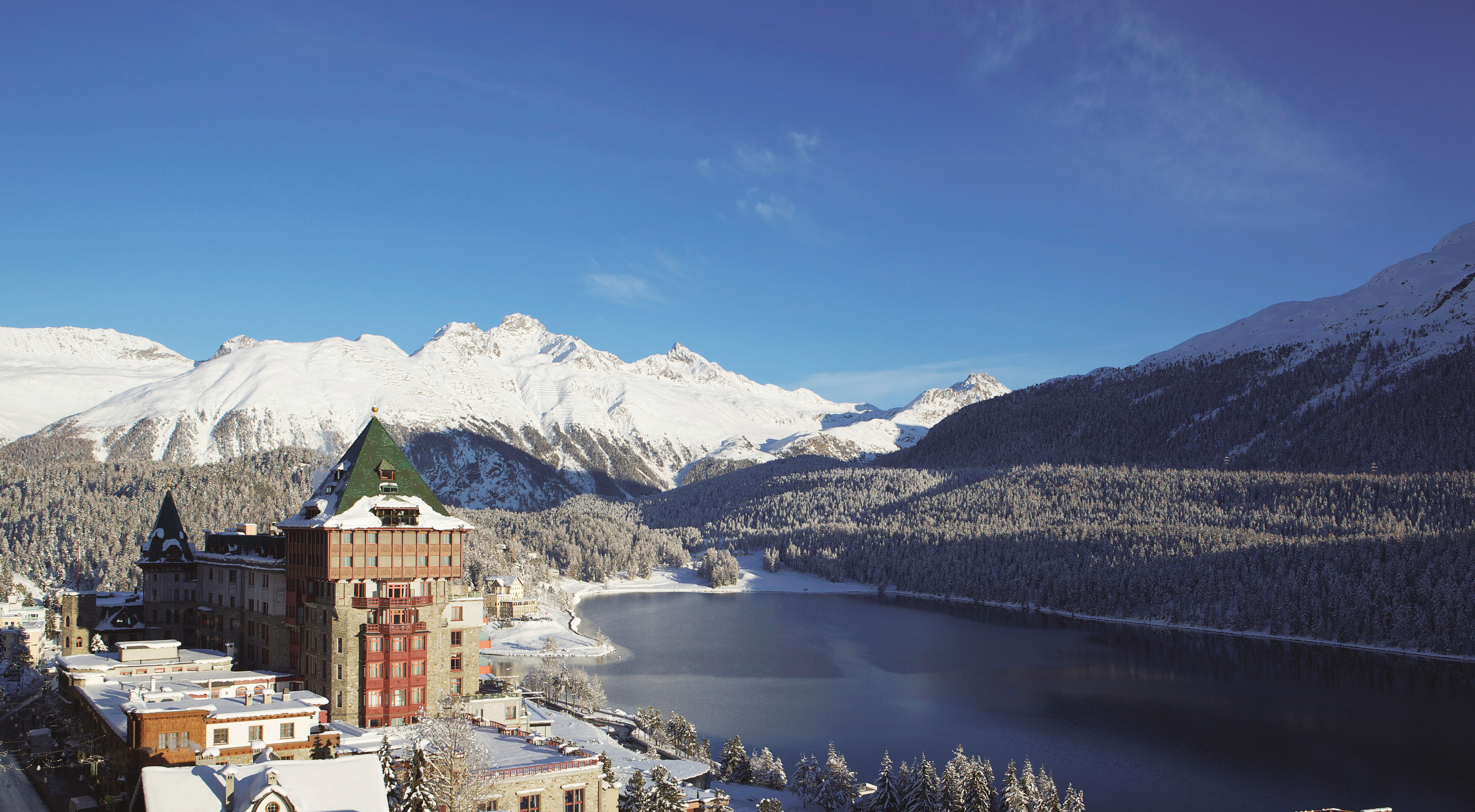
The Badrutt's Palace Hotel is considered the birthplace of winter sports

Thanks to its favorable location, St. Moritz enjoys over 300 days of sunshine a year. Every winter it hosts the "White Turf" horse race on the frozen Lake St. Moritz, attended by the international upper class. Prominent property owners in St. Moritz included Sonja Ziemann, Gunter Sachs, Herbert von Karajan, Lakshmi Mittal, Ivan Glasenberg, Mohammad Reza Pahlavi, Maurizio Gucci, Giorgio Armani, Ingvar Kamprad, Helmut Horten, Giovanni Agnelli, Silvio Berlusconi, Remo Ruffini, Dean and Dan Caten, Andrey Melnichenko, the Heineken family, Aristotle Onassis and Stavros Niarchos.

Popular pastimes include skiing, snowboarding, and hiking, and nearby there is also the world-famous Cresta Run toboggan course.

The year-round population is 5,600, with some 3,000 seasonal employees supporting hotels and rental units with a total of 13,000 beds. The Kulm Hotel St. Moritz is a large luxury hotel in St. Moritz.

== Main sights ==
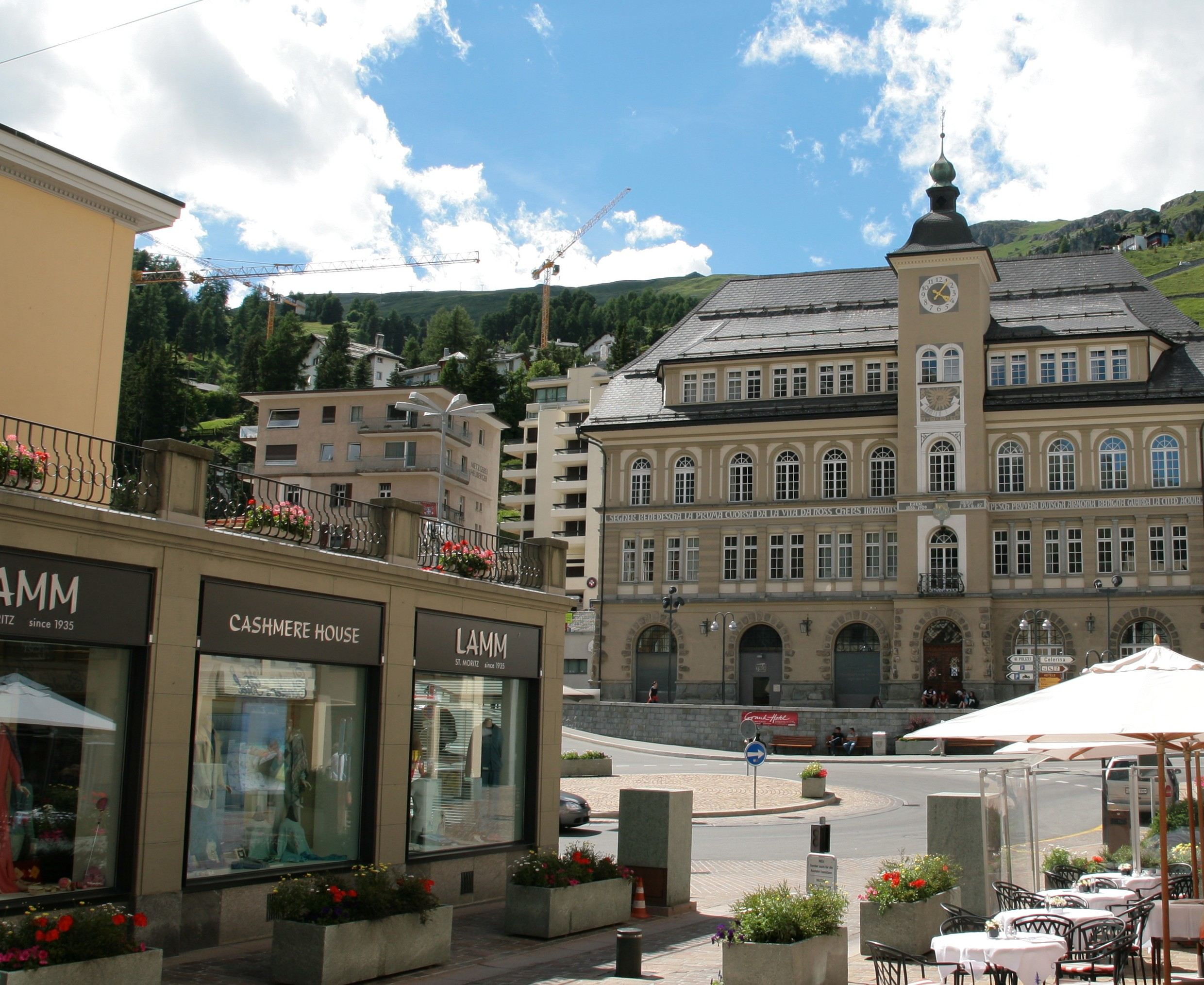
Plazza da Scoula and St. Moritz Library

- The Segantini Museum: dedicated to Giovanni Segantini, a painter who lived the last five years of his life in Engadine. The Segantini Museum is listed as a Swiss heritage site of national significance.
- The bobsled run: a very rare all-natural venue, typically open by mid-December.
- Viewing the glacier landscape: there are a number of notable vistas. Much can be seen by descending from Diavolezza to the Morteratsch Glacier.
- The 3,300 m (10,800 ft) Piz Corvatsch with its ice cave and its lengthy 8 km (5 mi) piste down to St. Moritz-Bad.

== Climate ==
St. Moritz has a subarctic climate (Köppen: Dfc) due to its particularly high elevation near to the tree line. It has cool summers coupled with cold nights and very cold, snowy winters with highs around freezing and 254 cm (100 in) of average annual snowfall. The average temperature, about 2 °C (36 °F; measured in the nearby town of Samedan), is extremely low compared to that of the Swiss Plateau. It is also significantly lower than that of La Brévine, traditionally considered the coldest inhabited place in Switzerland.

Climate data for St. Moritz (Samedan Airport), elevation 1,709 m (5,607 ft), (1991–2020 normals, extremes 1901–present)
Month	Jan	Feb	Mar	Apr	May	Jun	Jul	Aug	Sep	Oct	Nov	Dec	Year
Record high °C (°F)	12.9 (55.2)	11.7 (53.1)	14.1 (57.4)	21.0 (69.8)	28.0 (82.4)	32.0 (89.6)	30.5 (86.9)	29.2 (84.6)	25.1 (77.2)	21.4 (70.5)	17.0 (62.6)	13.4 (56.1)	32.0 (89.6)
Mean daily maximum °C (°F)	−1.3 (29.7)	0.5 (32.9)	4.0 (39.2)	7.9 (46.2)	12.9 (55.2)	17.0 (62.6)	19.3 (66.7)	18.8 (65.8)	14.6 (58.3)	10.5 (50.9)	4.1 (39.4)	−0.7 (30.7)	9.0 (48.2)
Daily mean °C (°F)	−8.4 (16.9)	−7.1 (19.2)	−2.4 (27.7)	1.9 (35.4)	6.7 (44.1)	10.5 (50.9)	12.3 (54.1)	11.8 (53.2)	7.9 (46.2)	3.6 (38.5)	−2.1 (28.2)	−7.0 (19.4)	2.3 (36.1)
Mean daily minimum °C (°F)	−15.8 (3.6)	−15.6 (3.9)	−9.6 (14.7)	−4.3 (24.3)	0.1 (32.2)	3.2 (37.8)	4.7 (40.5)	4.7 (40.5)	1.3 (34.3)	−2.6 (27.3)	−7.8 (18.0)	−13.4 (7.9)	−4.6 (23.7)
Record low °C (°F)	−36.9 (−34.4)	−35.1 (−31.2)	−30.0 (−22.0)	−21.7 (−7.1)	−18.6 (−1.5)	−9.5 (14.9)	−5.4 (22.3)	−6.7 (19.9)	−11.6 (11.1)	−21.4 (−6.5)	−29.9 (−21.8)	−34.4 (−29.9)	−36.9 (−34.4)
Average precipitation mm (inches)	29.4 (1.16)	19.0 (0.75)	23.7 (0.93)	36.9 (1.45)	67.0 (2.64)	90.9 (3.58)	86.8 (3.42)	100.4 (3.95)	73.2 (2.88)	76.6 (3.02)	69.8 (2.75)	36.6 (1.44)	710.3 (27.96)
Average snowfall cm (inches)	52.4 (20.6)	38.9 (15.3)	32.5 (12.8)	23.5 (9.3)	6.3 (2.5)	0.6 (0.2)	0.3 (0.1)	0.3 (0.1)	1.2 (0.5)	8.1 (3.2)	40.8 (16.1)	49.9 (19.6)	254.8 (100.3)
Average precipitation days (≥ 1.0 mm)	5.2	4.2	4.3	6.0	9.2	11.0	10.6	11.0	8.0	8.1	7.9	6.1	91.6
Average snowy days (≥ 1.0 cm)	9.1	7.4	7.6	5.8	1.5	0.3	0.1	0.1	0.6	2.0	6.8	9.1	50.4
Average relative humidity (%)	78	74	70	69	70	71	72	75	76	77	79	80	74
Mean monthly sunshine hours	120.0	121.3	147.4	150.2	164.4	185.8	199.1	180.9	154.9	138.1	103.2	102.0	1,767.3
Source 1: NOAA
Source 2: MeteoSwiss (snow 1981–2010) KNMI

== Demographics ==
=== Population ===
St. Moritz has a population (as of 31 December 2020) of 4,945. As of 2008, 38.0% of the population was made up of foreign nationals. Over the 10 years up to 2009 the population decreased at a rate of 4.9%.

As of 2000, the gender distribution of the population was 45.4% male and 54.6% female. The age distribution, as of 2000, in St. Moritz is; 423 children or 7.6% of the population are between 0 and 9 years old and 502 teenagers or 9.0% are between 10 and 19. Of the adult population, 960 people or 17.2% of the population are between 20 and 29 years old. 1,055 people or 18.9% are between 30 and 39, 864 people or 15.5% are between 40 and 49, and 820 people or 14.7% are between 50 and 59. The senior population distribution is 532 people or 9.5% of the population are between 60 and 69 years old, 289 people or 5.2% are between 70 and 79, there are 121 people or 2.2% who are between 80 and 89, and there are 23 people or 0.4% who are 90 and older.

In 2014 there were 2,822 private households in St. Moritz with an average household size of 1.84 persons. Of the 884 inhabited buildings in the municipality, in 2000, about 29.1% were single family homes and 40.8% were multiple family buildings. Additionally, about 19.9% of the buildings were built before 1919, while 8.6% were built between 1991 and 2000. In 2013 the rate of construction of new housing units per 1000 residents was 9.32. The vacancy rate for the municipality, in 2015, was 3.18%.

Historic Population
year	population
1803	183
1850	228
1900	1,603
1910	3,197
1950	2,558
1960	3,751
1970	5,699
1980	5,900
1990	5,426
2000	5,589

Population by nationality (Census 2000)
Nationality	Number Without dual-citizens	Number Including dual-citizens
Switzerland	3,079	3,527
Italy	897	1,162
Portugal	435	445
Germany	202	232
Serbia & Montenegro	106	108
Austria	74	104
France	56	73
Croatia	62	63
Spain	33	41
United Kingdom	30	41
Netherlands	17	29
Bosnia-Herzegovina	27	28

=== Politics ===
In the 2015 federal election, the most popular party was the FDP with 31.0% of the vote. The next three most popular parties were the SVP (27.0%), the BDP (15.1%) and the CVP (11.0%). In the federal election, a total of 1,428 votes were cast, and the voter turnout was 54.1%.

In the 2007 federal election, the most popular party was the SVP which received 34.9% of the vote. The next three most popular parties were the FDP (24.5%), the SP (22.4%), and the CVP (17%).

=== Education ===
In St. Moritz about 65.8% of the population (between age 25–64) have completed either non-mandatory upper secondary education or additional higher education (either university or a Fachhochschule).

=== Employment ===
St. Moritz is a regional economic centre and a tourist community. As of 2014, there were a total of 7,590 people employed in the municipality. Of these, a total of 24 people worked in 7 businesses in the primary economic sector. The secondary sector employed 1,039 workers in 74 separate businesses. A minority (17.0%) of the secondary sector employees worked in very small businesses. There were 22 small businesses with a total of 533 employees and 3 mid sized businesses with a total of 329 employees. Finally, the tertiary sector provided 6,527 jobs in 768 businesses. In 2014 a total of 3,820 employees worked in 752 small companies (less than 50 employees). There were 14 mid sized businesses with 1,928 employees and 2 large businesses which employed 779 people (for an average size of 389.5). The Badrutt's Palace Hotel (Five Star) has a staff of 520 persons and is the biggest employer in St. Moritz.

In 2014 a total of 9.3% of the population received social assistance.

In the second quarter of 2016 an average of 1,062 workers commuted from outside Switzerland to work in the municipality, representing a minority of the employees.

In 2015 local hotels had a total of 599,734 overnight stays, of which 69.2% were international visitors. In the same year there was one movie theater in the municipality with 267 seats.

=== Languages ===
Most of the population (as of 2000) speaks German (58.8%), with Italian being second most common (21.8%), and Portuguese being third (6.6%). Originally, the entire population spoke the Upper-Engadin Romansh dialect of Puter. Due to increasing trade with the outside world, Romansh usage began to decline. In 1880, only 50.2% spoke Romansh as a first language. Romansh lost ground to both German and Italian. In 1900, 31% of the population spoke Italian as a first language, and in 1910, it was about the same. In the following years, the percentage of Romansh and Italian speakers both decreased against German speakers. In 1941, approx 20% spoke Romansh, and in 1970 it was 8%. In 2000, only 4.7% of the population spoke Romansh.

Languages in St. Moritz GR
Languages	Census 1980		Census 1990		Census 2000	
Languages	Number	Percent	Number	Percent	Number	Percent
German	3,092	52.41%	3,186	58.72%	3,286	58.79%
Italian	1,608	27.25%	1,157	21.32%	1,220	21.83%
Romansh	569	9.64%	338	6.23%	264	4.72%
Population	5,900	100%	5,426	100%	5,589	100%

== Transportation ==
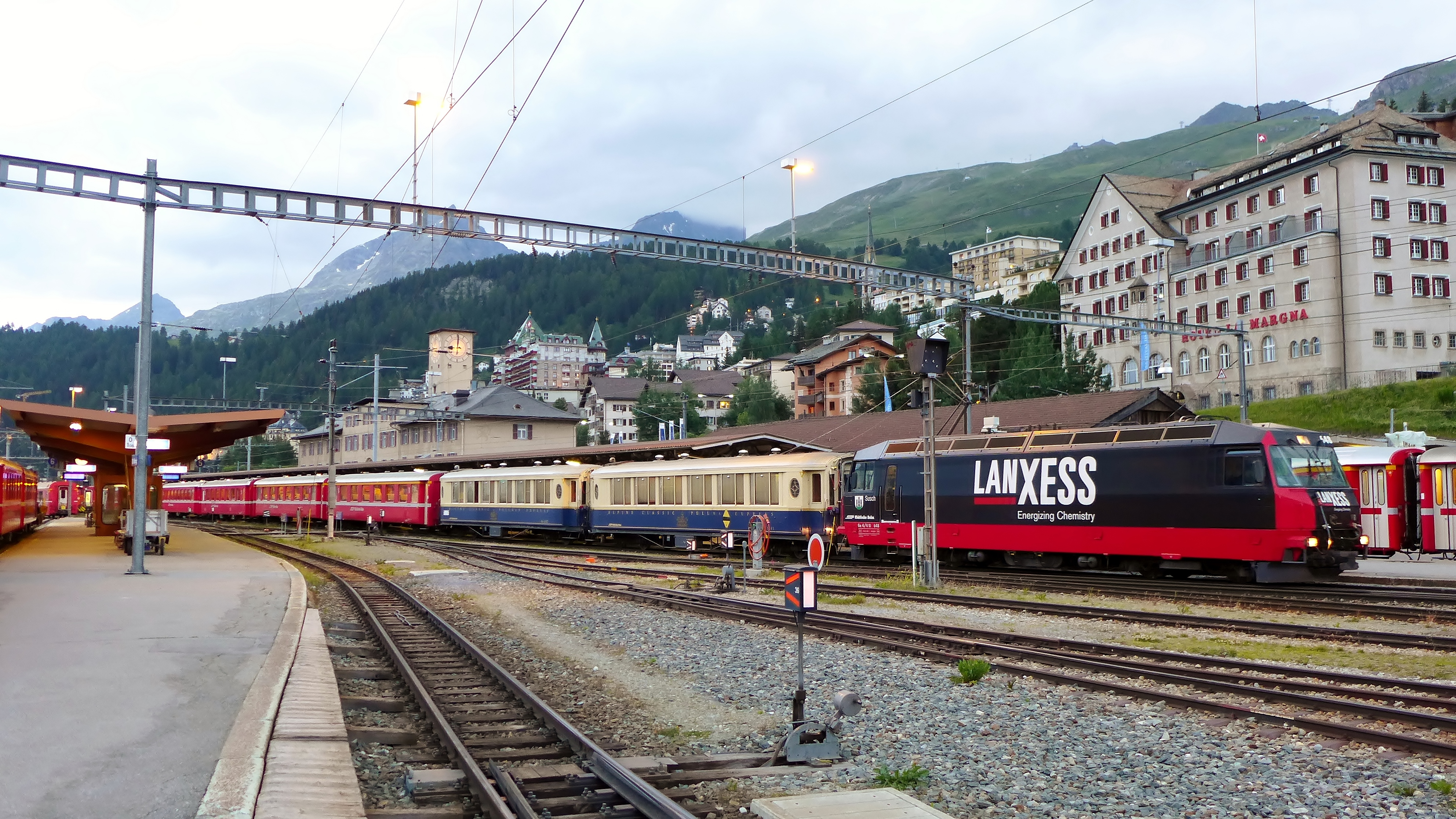
St. Moritz is a regional hub for trains and buses

St. Moritz is the highest town in the country with a railway station. St. Moritz railway station is situated in the town center, near the lakeshore and at the bottom of Via Serlas. It is operated by the Rhaetian Railway, and is the terminus for Albula and Bernina railway lines. The Glacier Express and Bernina Express trains stop at St. Moritz.

Near the railway station is an important Swiss PostBus stop.

The St. Moritz–Corviglia Funicular links St. Moritz with the Corviglia summit and ski area.

The nearest airports to St Moritz are:

- Samedan Airport (5 km (3.1 mi) away)
- Milan Bergamo Airport (153 km (95 mi) away)
- Milan Linate Airport (170 km (110 mi) away)
- Milan Malpensa Airport (183 km (114 mi) away)
- Zurich Airport (226 km (140 mi) away)

== In popular culture ==
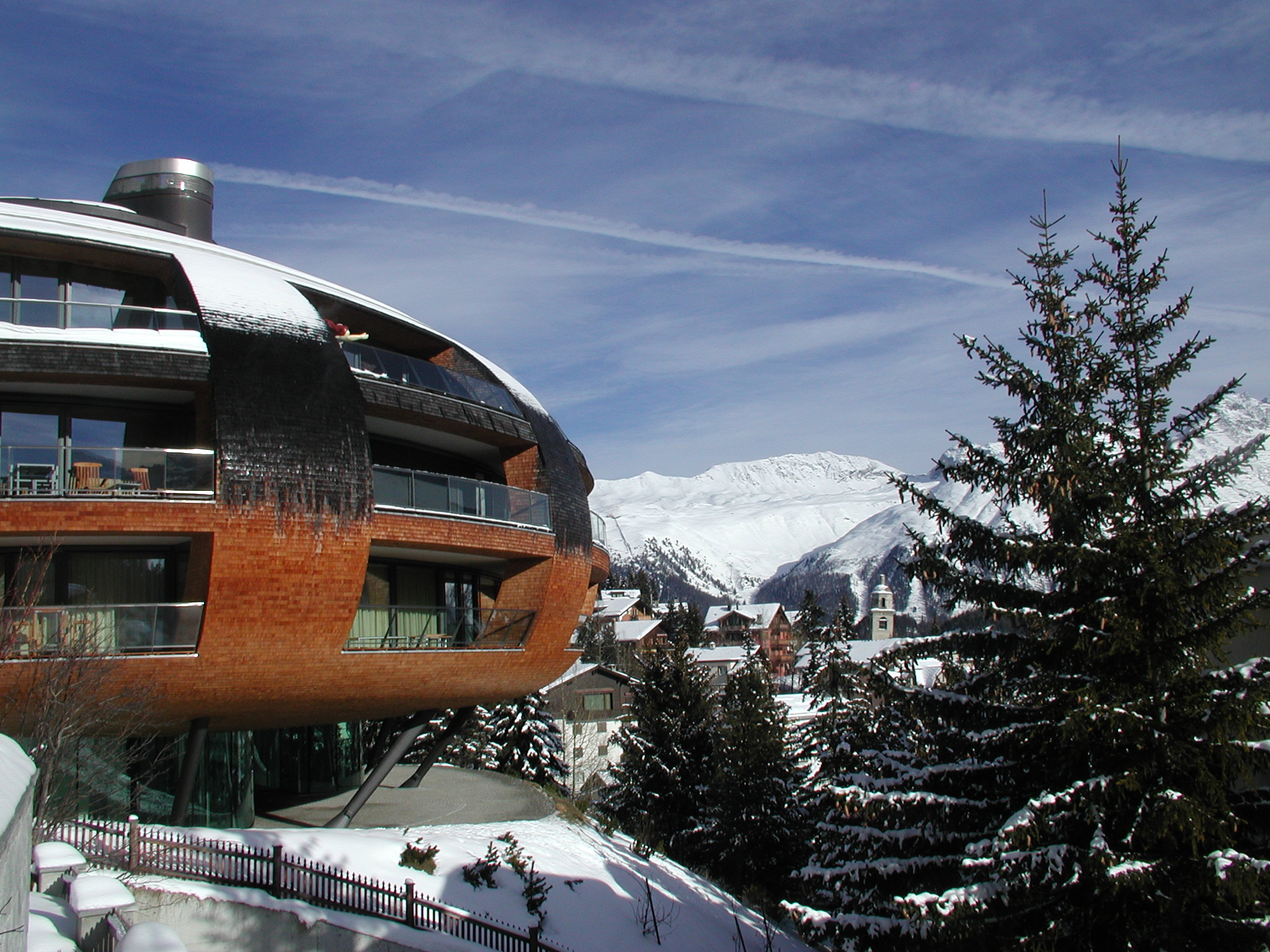
Norman Foster's Chesa Futura in St. Moritz

- Mentioned in the 1995 film Jumanji.
- Featured in the opening scenes of The Man Who Knew Too Much, a 1934 thriller film directed by Alfred Hitchcock.
- Mentioned in James Bond films: Goldfinger in 1964 and For Your Eyes Only in 1981. Ski scenes from James Bond movies The Spy Who Loved Me and A View to a Kill were filmed at St. Moritz although attributed to other locations in the dialogue.
- Mentioned in the 1969 Peter Sarstedt hit Where Do You Go To (My Lovely)?, describing a Euro jet-setter who flies to St. Moritz in winter.
- Mentioned in the popular 1990 romantic thriller novel Memories of Midnight, by Sidney Sheldon, as a ski-resort where the characters of Catherine Alexander and Kirk Reynolds go for vacation.
- Location of Kars' hideout in JoJo's Bizarre Adventure Part 2: Battle Tendency.
- Mentioned in the 2004 film The Prince & Me.
- Shown in an episode of Smallville; where Lois Lane's sister is running from the mob.
- Shown in a first-season episode of Cheap Seats. The Sklar Brothers riff an episode of Wide World of Sports from the 1960s which showcased horse racing on a frozen Lake St. Moritz.
- Mentioned in the 1990 novel, Public Secrets, by Nora Roberts, as a vacation getaway for character Emma McAvoy.
- Included in the list of ski resorts in the refrain from the Global Deejays' remix of The Sound of San Francisco (Snow Radio) version: "Kitzbühel, Schladming, Ischgl, St. Anton, Zillertal, Seiser Alm, Kaprun, Aspen, Semmering, St. Moritz, Cortina, St. Johann, Mount Everest, Rocky Mountains".
- Part of the 2021 Netflix movie Army of Thieves.
- The place where Maurizio Gucci hides from the Italian police, and meets Paola Franchi, his future girlfriend (2021 movie House of Gucci, 2001 book The House of Gucci: A Sensational Story of Murder, Madness, Glamour, and Greed, but also real-life events).

== Notable people ==
- Stavros Niarchos (1909–1996), Greek magnate; lived in St. Moritz
- Bibi Torriani (1911–1988), Swiss ice hockey player and coach, IIHF Hall of Fame inductee
- Lieutenant Colonel Digby Willoughby MC MBE (1934–2007), soldier and sportsman, chief executive of the St. Moritz Tobogganing Club from 1978
- Günter Traub (born 1939), German speed skater; lives in St. Moritz
- Gian Franco Kasper (1944–2021), a Swiss ski official and president of the International Ski and Snowboard Federation (FIS) from 1998 to 2021
- Clifton Wrottesley (born 1968), Irish sportsman and British peer; lives in St. Moritz
- Thomas Flohr (born 1960), Swiss billionaire businessman, founder and chairman of VistaJet; lives in St. Moritz
- Vaslav Nijinsky (1889-1950), Russian dancer, lived in St. Moritz from 1917 to 1919

== See also ==
- Hotel St. Moritz in New York, named after the village
- Tourism in Switzerland
