= Kulm Hotel St. Moritz =

Hotel in St. Moritz, Switzerland

Coordinates: 46.4990142°N 9.8386914°E

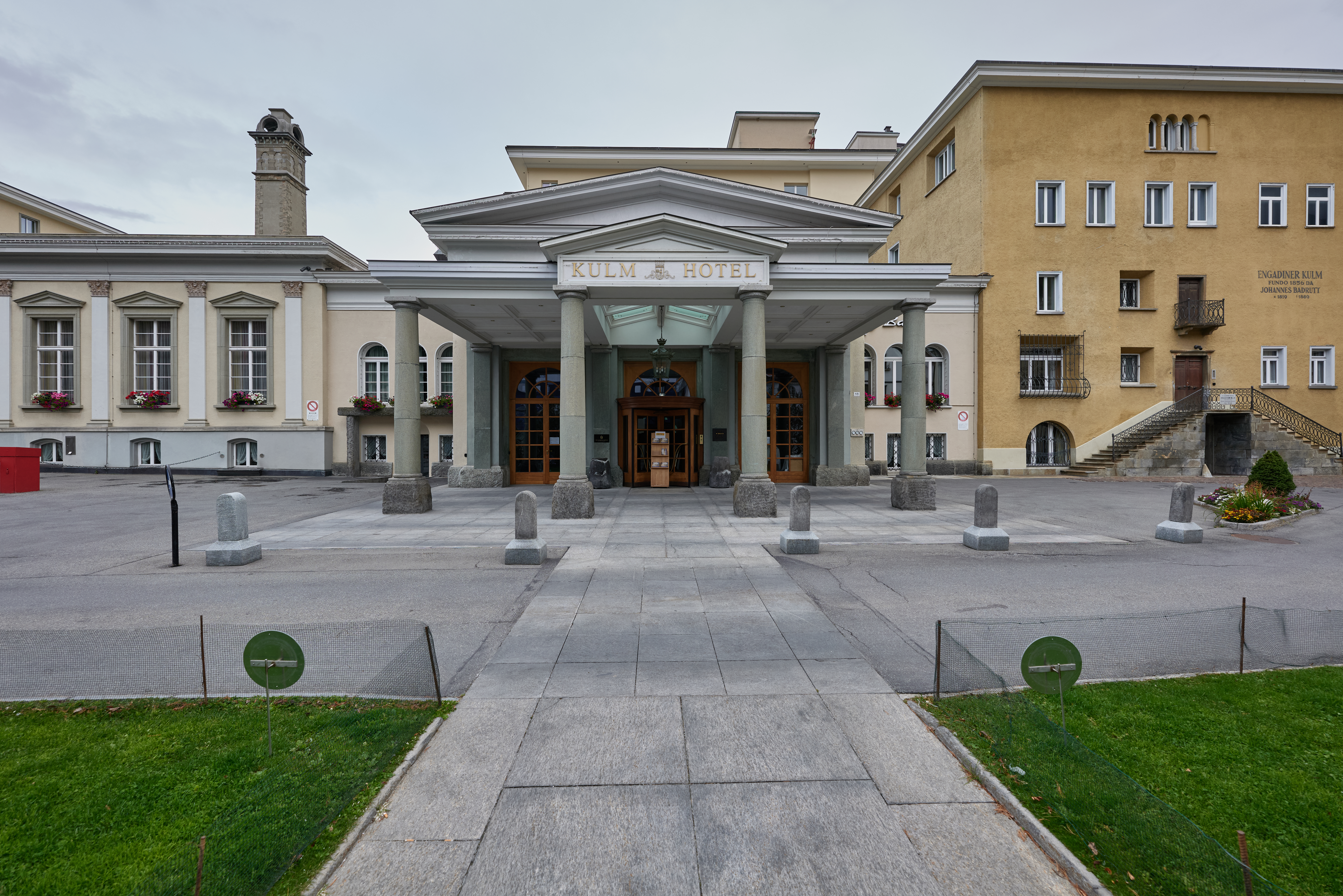
The hotel's main entrance

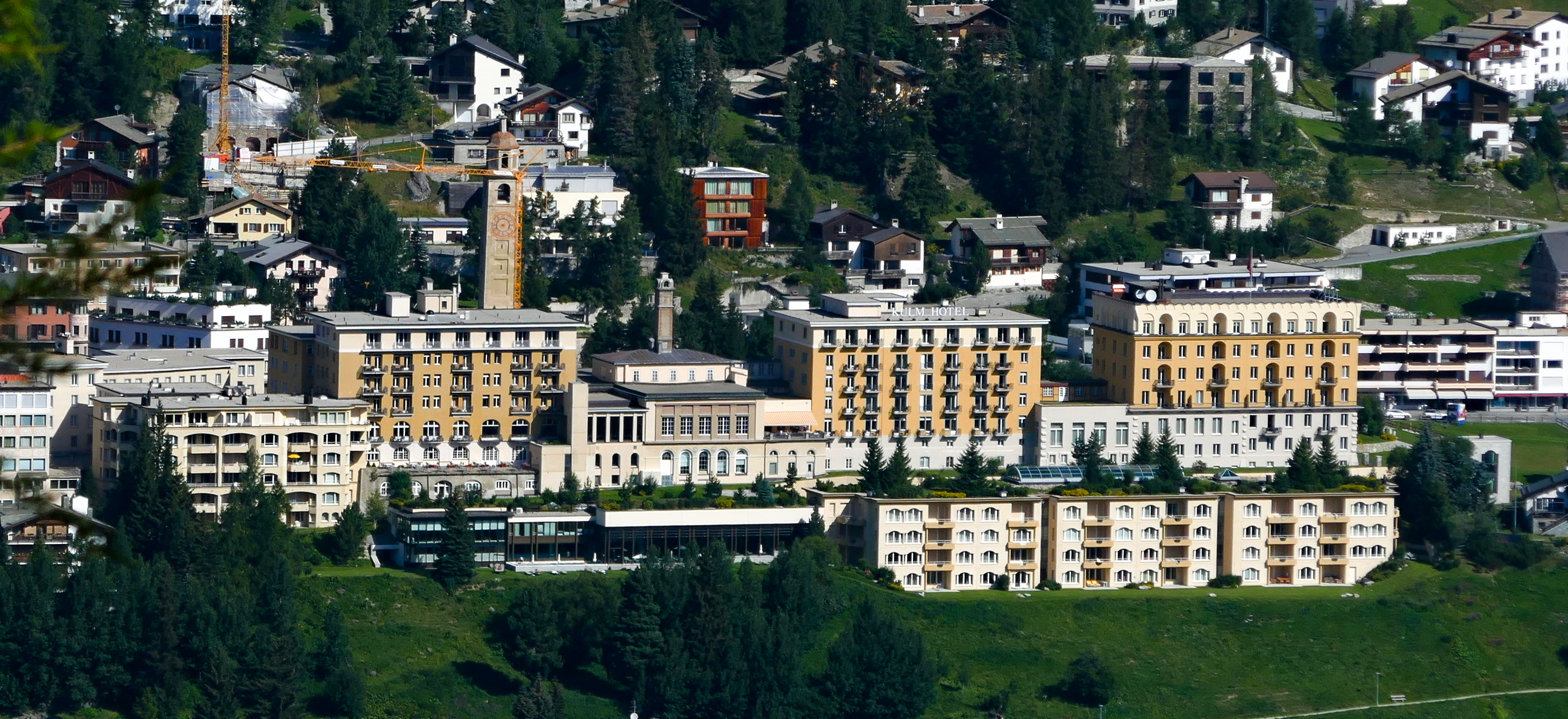
View of the hotel from the south

The Kulm Hotel St. Moritz is a historic 5-star luxury hotel located in the Engadin valley in St. Moritz, Switzerland. Founded in 1856 by Johannes Badrutt, it played a key role in the development of Alpine winter tourism. The hotel is situated near the St. Moritz–Corviglia funicular and Lake St. Moritz, offering views of the Albula Alps and access to hiking trails such as the Via Alpina. The name "Kulm" derives from the Latin culmen, meaning "hill".

The hotel’s interiors reflect a combination of its 19th-century heritage and modern luxury. Public areas feature high ceilings, marble pillars, chandeliers, and red velvet furnishings, while corridors display artefacts related to the hotel’s sporting history and former royal guests. The hotel grounds were used during the 1928 and 1948 Winter Olympic Games.

== History ==
In 1904, the Olympia Bobrun from St. Moritz to Celerina was opened on the grounds of the Kulm Hotel. Since then, international races have taken place annually on the natural ice track.

In the 1960s, the hotel was acquired by the Niarchos family, a Greek shipping dynasty.

In 2018, the hotel was featured on the BBC television programme Amazing Hotels: Life Beyond the Lobby.

In April 2025, the Kulm Hotel announced a CHF 125 million renovation project to be carried out over six to seven years. Led by architect Norman Foster, the project aims to blend historic preservation with contemporary design, using local materials and Swiss contractors.

== See also ==
- Badrutt's Palace Hotel
- Historic Hotels of Europe
- List of hotels in Switzerland
- Tourism in Switzerland
