= Bobsleigh at the 1948 Winter Olympics – Four-man =

The four-man bobsleigh results at the 1948 Winter Olympics in St. Moritz, Switzerland. The competition was held on Friday and Saturday, 6 and 7 February 1948.

== Medal table ==
Gold	Silver	Bronze
United States; USA II; Francis Tyler; Patrick Martin; Edward Rimkus; William D'Amico	Belgium; Belgium I Max Houben; Freddy Mansveld; Louis-Georges Niels; Jacques Mouvet	United States; USA I James Bickford; Thomas Hicks; Donald Dupree; William Dupree

== Results ==
Rank	Team	Athletes	Run 1	Run 2	Run 3	Run 4	Final
Gold	United States USA II	Francis Tyler, Patrick Martin, Edward Rimkus, & William D'Amico	1:17.1	1:19.6	1:21.4	1:22.0	5:20.1
Silver	Belgium Belgium I	Max Houben, Freddy Mansveld, Louis-Georges Niels, & Jacques Mouvet	1:17.3	1:20.9	1:22.0	1:21.1	5:21.3
Bronze	United States USA I	James Bickford, Thomas Hicks, Donald Dupree, & William Dupree	1:17.4	1:20.7	1:21.8	1:21.6	5:21.5
4	Switzerland Switzerland I	Fritz Feierabend, Friedrich Waller, Felix Endrich, & Heinrich Angst	1:16.9	1:21.2	1:22.3	1:21.7	5:22.1
5	Norway Norway I	Arne Holst, Ivar Johansen, Reidar Berg, & Alf Large	1:17.3	1:20.8	1:21.4	1:23.0	5:22.5
6	Italy Italy I	Nino Bibbia, Giancarlo Ronchetti, Edilberto Campadese, & Luigi Cavalieri	1:18.2	1:20.8	1:22.1	1:21.9	5:23.0
7	Great Britain Great Britain I	William Coles, William McLean, Raymond Collings, & George Holliday	1:18.5	1:20.9	1:22.5	1:23.0	5:23.3
8	Switzerland Switzerland II	Franz Kapus, Werner Spring, Bernhard Schilter, & Paul Eberhard	1:17.6	1:20.8	1:22.3	1:24.7	5:25.5
9	France France I	René Charlet, Jean Morin, Jacques Descatoire, & Amédée Ronzel	1:18.9	1:22.2	1:23.8	1:24.5	5:29.4
10	Norway Norway II	Bjarne Schrøen, Gunnar Thoresen, Arnold Dyrdahl, & Benn John Valsø	1:20.0	1:22.6	1:23.6	1:23.5	5:29.7
11	Italy Italy II	Nino Rovelli, Enrico Airoldi, Vittorio Folonari, & Remo Airoldi	1:19.8	1:22.8	1:23.2	1:24.4	5:30.2
12	Argentina Argentina I	Justo del Carril, Salvador Correa, Marcello de Ridder, & Héctor Tomasi	1:20.5	1:23.4	1:24.5	1:24.5	5:32.9
13	France France II	Gilbert Achard-Picard, Félix Bonnat, Louis Saint-Calbre, & Henri Evrot	1:20.7	1:24.7	1:24.7	1:25.3	5:35.4
14	Czechoslovakia Czechoslovakia I	Max Ippen, František Zajíšek, Ivan Šipajlo, & Eduard Novotný	1:20.6	1:24.1	1:25.4	1:25.4	5:35.5
15	Great Britain Great Britain II	Richard Jeffrey, Edgar Meddings, George Powell-Sheddon, & James Iremonger	1:20.8	1:24.3	1:29.8	1:26.2	5:41.1

The competition was halted in the middle of the second round when a water pipe burst, flooding the bobrun.
