= United States at the 1948 Winter Olympics =

- Flag of the United States
- IOC code: USA
- NOC: United States Olympic Committee

in St. Moritz
- Competitors: 69 (59 men, 10 women) in 4 sports
- Flag bearer: John Heaton (skeleton)
- Medals Ranked 4th: Gold 3 Silver 4 Bronze 2 Total 9

Winter Olympics appearances (overview)
- 1924; 1928; 1932; 1936; 1948; 1952; 1956; 1960; 1964; 1968; 1972; 1976; 1980; 1984; 1988; 1992; 1994; 1998; 2002; 2006; 2010; 2014; 2018; 2022; 2026

The United States competed at the 1948 Winter Olympics in St. Moritz, Switzerland.

== Medalists ==
The following U.S. competitors won medals at the games. In the by discipline sections below, medalists' names are bolded.

Medal	Name	Sport	Event	Date
Gold	Gretchen Fraser	Alpine skiing	Women's slalom	February 5
Gold	Dick Button	Figure skating	Men's singles	February 5
Gold	William D'Amico; Patrick Martin; Edward Rimkus; Francis Tyler	Bobsleigh	Four-man	February 7
Silver	Ken Bartholomew	Speed skating	500 meters	January 31
Silver	Robert Fitzgerald	Speed skating	500 meters	January 31
Silver	Gretchen Fraser	Alpine skiing	Women's combined	February 4
Silver	John Heaton	Skeleton	Men's competition	February 4
Bronze	Schuyler Carron; Frederick Fortune	Bobsleigh	Two-man	January 31
Bronze	James Bickford; Donald Dupree; William Dupree; Thomas Hicks	Bobsleigh	Four-man	February 7

Medals by sport
Sport	1st place, gold medalist(s)	2nd place, silver medalist(s)	3rd place, bronze medalist(s)	Total
Alpine skiing	1	1	0	**2**
Bobsleigh	1	0	2	**3**
Figure skating	1	0	0	**1**
Speed skating	0	2	0	**2**
Skeleton	0	1	0	**1**
Total	3	4	2	9

Medals by gender
Gender	1st place, gold medalist(s)	2nd place, silver medalist(s)	3rd place, bronze medalist(s)	Total	Percentage
Male	2	3	2	**7**	77.8%
Female	1	1	0	**2**	22.2%
Total	3	4	2	9	100%

Multiple medalists
Name	Sport	1st place, gold medalist(s)	2nd place, silver medalist(s)	3rd place, bronze medalist(s)	Total
Gretchen Fraser	Alpine skiing	1	1	0	**2**

== Alpine skiing ==
Timed events
Men

Athlete	Event	Run 1		Run 2		Total	
Athlete	Event	Time	Rank	Time	Rank	Time	Rank
Bob Blatt	Downhill	—N/a				3:27.4	44
Dev Jennings	Downhill	—N/a				3:28.2	45
Steve Knowlton	Downhill	—N/a				3:26.2	43
Barney McLean	Downhill	—N/a				3:30.1	47
Dick Movitz	Downhill	—N/a				3:25.2	42
Jack Reddish	Downhill	—N/a				3:12.3	26
Steve Knowlton	Slalom	1:12.9	16	1:07.6	17	2:20.5	16
Barney McLean	Slalom	1:20.5	30	1:07.6	17	2:28.1	24
Colin Stewart	Slalom	1:15.3	23	1:08.8	21	2:24.1	20
Jack Reddish	Slalom	1:11.0	10	1:04.5	5	2:15.5	7

Women

Athlete	Event	Run 1		Run 2		Total	
Athlete	Event	Time	Rank	Time	Rank	Time	Rank
Becky Cremer	Downhill	—N/a				2:44.2	22
Gretchen Fraser	Downhill	—N/a				2:37.1	13
Brynhild Grasmoen	Downhill	—N/a				2:36.0	12
Paula Kann	Downhill	—N/a				2:49.0	28
Andrea Mead	Downhill	—N/a				3:03.1	35
Ruth-Marie Stewart	Downhill	—N/a				2:42.0	20
Gretchen Fraser	Slalom	59.7	1	57.5	2	1:57.2	1st place, gold medalist(s)
Brynhild Grasmoen	Slalom	1:05.6	12	1:04.0	12	2:09.6	9
Paula Kann	Slalom	1:07.8	16	1:02.0	9	2:09.8	11
Andrea Mead	Slalom	1:05.1	11	1:03.7	11	2:08.8	8

Combined
The downhill part of the combined events were held concurrently with the individual downhill skiing events. For athletes competing in both events, the same time was used (see table above for the results). The slalom part of the events were held separate from the individual slalom competitions.

Men

Athlete	Event	Downhill		Slalom				Total	
Athlete	Event	Time	Points	Time 1	Time 2	Total	Points	Points	Rank
Bob Blatt	Combined	3:27.4	18.09	1:15.6	1:21.4	2:37.0	9.74	27.83	29
Steve Knowlton	Combined	3:26.2	17.32	1:15.5	1:14.0	2:29.5	6.42	23.75	25
Barney McLean	Combined	3:30.1	19.42	1:16.4	1:11.5	2:27.9	5.73	25.15	26
Jack Reddish	Combined	3:12.3	9.71	1:14.1	1:08.8	2:22.9	3.53	13.24	12

Women

Athlete	Event	Downhill		Slalom				Total	
Athlete	Event	Time	Points	Time 1	Time 2	Total	Points	Points	Rank
Becky Cremer	Combined	2:44.2	10.11	1:09.4	1:12.5	2:21.9	11.90	22.01	17
Gretchen Fraser	Combined	2:37.1	5.50	1:01.8	59.2	2:01.0	1.45	6.95	2nd place, silver medalist(s)
Andrea Mead	Combined	3:03.1	22.14	1:03.8	1:11.7	2:15.5	8.70	30.84	21
Ruth-Marie Stewart	Combined	2:42.0	8.58	1:09.8	1:06.6	2:16.4	9.15	17.73	16

== Bobsleigh ==
Athlete	Event	Run 1		Run 2		Run 3		Run 4		Total	
Athlete	Event	Time	Rank	Time	Rank	Time	Rank	Time	Rank	Time	Rank
Frederick Fortune; Schuyler Carron	Two-man	1:25.5	8	1:24.1	3	1:22.5	3	1:23.2	3	5:35.3	3rd place, bronze medalist(s)
Tuffield A. Latour; Leo J. Martin	Two-man	1:24.9	4	1:24.8	6	1:24.1	8	1:25.4	12	5:39.2	9
James Bickford; Thomas Hicks; Donald Dupree; William Dupree	Four-man	1:17.4	5	1:20.7	2	1:21.8	4	1:21.6	2	5:21.5	3rd place, bronze medalist(s)
Francis Tyler; Patrick Martin; Edward Rimkus; William D'Amico	Four-man	1:17.1	2	1:19.6	1	1:21.4	1	1:22.0	5	5:20.1	1st place, gold medalist(s)

== Cross-country skiing ==
Athlete	Event	Time	Rank
Wendell Broomhall	18 km	1:31:40	65
Corey Engen	18 km	1:37:24	75
Don Johnson	18 km	1:32:03	66
Ralph Townsend	18 km	1:37:12	74
Gordy Wren	18 km	1:40:12	77

== Figure skating ==
Individual

Athlete	Event	CF	FS	Total		
Athlete	Event	Rank	Rank	Points	Places	Rank
Dick Button	Men's singles	1	1	191.177	10	1st place, gold medalist(s)
James Grogan	Men's singles	9	6	168.711	62	6
John Lettengarver	Men's singles	4	2	176.400	36	4
Gretchen Merrill	Ladies singles	6	11	148.466	73	8
Eileen Seigh	Ladies singles	10	10	144.111	110	11
Yvonne Sherman	Ladies singles	8	5	149.833	62	6

Mixed

Athletes	Event	Points	Score	Rank
Karol Kennedy; Peter Kennedy	Pairs	10.536	59.5	6
Yvonne Sherman; Robert Swenning	Pairs	10.581	53	4

== Ice hockey ==
The tournament was almost cancelled when rival teams representing the United States arrived. An Amateur Athletic Union (AAU) team was supported by the United States Olympic Committee (USOC), and an Amateur Hockey Association (AHA) team was supported by the Ligue Internationale de Hockey sur Glace (LIHG). At the center of the issue was amateurism. The International Olympic Committee ruled that neither team could compete, but the Swiss organizing committee allowed the AAU team to march in the opening ceremony, and the AHA team to play unofficially, without being eligible for medals.

Summary

Team	Event	Opposition Score	Opposition Score	Opposition Score	Opposition Score	Opposition Score	Opposition Score	Opposition Score	Opposition Score	Rank
United States men	Men's tournament	Switzerland; L 4–5	Poland; W 23–4	Italy; W 31–1	Sweden; W 5–2	Canada; L 3–12	Austria; W 13–2	Great Britain; W 4–3	Czechoslovakia; L 3–4	DSQ (4)

Roster

Al Opsahl
Bruce Mather
Bruce Cunliffe
Donald Geary
Fred Pearson
Goodwin Harding
Herb Vaningen
Jack Kirrane
Jack Riley
Jack Garrity
Ralph Warburton
Robert Baker
Bob Boeser
Stan Priddy

Tournament

	Pld	W	L	T	GF	GA	Pts
Canada	8	7	0	1	69	5	15
Czechoslovakia	8	7	0	1	80	18	15
Switzerland	8	6	2	0	67	21	12
Sweden	8	4	4	0	55	28	8
Great Britain	8	3	5	0	39	47	6
Poland	8	2	6	0	29	97	4
Austria	8	1	7	0	33	77	2
Italy	8	0	8	0	24	156	0
United States DSQ	8	5	3	0	86	33	(10)

- Switzerland 5-4 USA
- USA 23-4 Poland
- USA 31-1 Italy
- USA 5-2 Sweden
- Canada 12-3 USA
- USA 13-2 Austria
- USA 4-3 United Kingdom
- Czechoslovakia 4-3 USA

== Nordic combined ==
The cross-country skiing part of this event was combined with the main medal event, meaning that athletes competing here were skiing for two disciplines at the same time. Details can be found above in this article, in the cross-country skiing section.

The ski jumping (normal hill) event was held separate from the main medal event of ski jumping, results can be found in the table below. Athletes would perform three jumps, of which the two best jumps (distance and form) were counted.

Athlete	Event	Cross-country			Ski Jumping				Total	
Athlete	Event	Time	Points	Rank	Distance 1	Distance 2	Points	Rank	Points	Rank
Corey Engen	Individual	1:34:24	132.00	34	65.5	64.0	214.8	3	346.80	26
Don Johnson	Individual	1:32:03	157.50	28	57.0	59.0	187.6	27	345.10	27
Ralph Townsend	Individual	1:37:12	138.00	33	61.0	58.0	188.7	24	326.70	33
Gordy Wren	Individual	1:40:12	120.00	36	66.5	68.5	220.2	2	340.20	29

== Skeleton ==
Athlete	Event	Run 1		Run 2		Run 3		Run 4		Run 5		Run 6		Total	
Athlete	Event	Time	Rank	Time	Rank	Time	Rank	Time	Rank	Time	Rank	Time	Rank	Time	Rank
Jack Heaton	Men's	48.1	5	47.4	1	47.7	2	1:00.0	2	1:00.2	1	1:01.2	5	5:24.6	2nd place, silver medalist(s)
William Johnson	Men's	47.7	2	48.4	5	48.0	4	DNF							
Mac MacCarthy	Men's	48.8	8	48.3	4	49.4	12	1:03.6	9	1:02.7	9	1:02.7	8	5:35.5	8
Wilbur Martin	Men's	47.8	3	49.2	11	48.2	5	1:00.7	3	1:01.6	5	1:00.5	3	5:28.0	4

== Ski jumping ==
Athlete	Event	Jump 1	Jump 2	Total	
Athlete	Event	Distance	Distance	Points	Rank
Walter Bietila	Normal hill	61.0	64.0 (fall)	142.9	42
Sverre Fredheim	Normal hill	66.0	65.0	210.1	12
Joe Perrault	Normal hill	61.0	67.0	207.0	15
Gordy Wren	Normal hill	68.0	68.5	222.8	5

== Speed skating ==
Athlete	Event	Time	Rank
Ken Bartholomew	500 m	43.2	2nd place, silver medalist(s)
Bobby Fitzgerald	500 m	43.2	2nd place, silver medalist(s)
Ken Henry	500 m	43.3	5
Del Lamb	500 m	43.6	6
Ray Blum	1500 m	2:23.4	20
Bobby Fitzgerald	1500 m	2:27.0	28
Ken Henry	1500 m	2:24.6	22
Johnny Werket	1500 m	2:20.2	6
Ray Blum	5000 m	8:54.4	17
Ken Henry	5000 m	8:56.0	18
Sonny Rupprecht	5000 m	8:58.4	21
Buddy Solem	5000 m	9:10.4	27
Sonny Rupprecht	10,000 m	21:20.3	17
Art Seaman	10,000 m	21:34.8	18
Buddy Solem	10,000 m	26:22.4	19
Johnny Werket	10,000 m	19:44.0	11
