= Bobsleigh at the 1948 Winter Olympics – Two-man =

The two-man bobsleigh results at the 1948 Winter Olympics in St. Moritz. The competition was held on Friday, January 30, 1948 and on Saturday, January 31, 1948.

== Medal table ==
| Gold | Silver | Bronze |
|---|---|---|
| Switzerland; Switzerland II; Felix Endrich; Friedrich Waller | Switzerland; Switzerland I Fritz Feierabend; Paul Eberhard | United States; USA II; Frederick Fortune; Schuyler Carron |

== Results ==
| Rank | Team | Athletes | Run 1 | Run 2 | Run 3 | Run 4 | Final |
|---|---|---|---|---|---|---|---|
| Gold | Switzerland Switzerland II | Felix Endrich & Friedrich Waller | 1:22.4 | 1:22.7 | 1:21.7 | 1:22.4 | 5:29.2 |
| Silver | Switzerland Switzerland I | Fritz Feierabend & Paul Eberhard | 1:23.7 | 1:24.0 | 1:21.4 | 1:21.3 | 5:30.4 |
| Bronze | United States USA II | Frederick Fortune & Schuyler Carron | 1:25.5 | 1:24.1 | 1:22.5 | 1:23.2 | 5:35.3 |
| 4 | Belgium Belgium I | Max Houben & Jacques Mouvet | 1:24.4 | 1:24.4 | 1:24.5 | 1:24.2 | 5:37.5 |
| 5 | Great Britain Great Britain I | William Coles & Raymond Collings | 1:25.2 | 1:24.4 | 1:24.2 | 1:24.1 | 5:37.9 |
| 6 | Italy Italy II | Mario Vitali & Dario Poggi | 1:25.0 | 1:25.0 | 1:23.8 | 1:24.2 | 5:38.0 |
| 7 | Norway Norway II | Arne Holst & Ivar Johansen | 1:25.6 | 1:25.0 | 1:23.7 | 1:23.9 | 5:38.2 |
| 8 | Italy Italy I | Nino Bibbia & Edilberto Campadese | 1:25.1 | 1:25.1 | 1:24.0 | 1:24.4 | 5:38.6 |
| 9 | United States USA I | Tuffield A. Latour & Leo J. Martin | 1:24.9 | 1:24.8 | 1:24.1 | 1:25.4 | 5:39.2 |
| 10 | Belgium Belgium II | Marcel Leclef & Louis-Georges Niels | 1:26.8 | 1:24.9 | 1:23.6 | 1:24.5 | 5:39.8 |
| 11 | France France I | Achille Fould & Henri Evrot | 1:25.8 | 1:25.3 | 1:24.7 | 1:24.6 | 5:40.4 |
| 12 | France France II | William Hirigoyen & Louis Saint-Calbre | 1:25.8 | 1:25.0 | 1:24.9 | 1:24.8 | 5:40.5 |
| 13 | Norway Norway I | Bjarne Schrøen & Gunnar Thoresen | 1:27.1 | 1:27.1 | 1:26.1 | 1:26.2 | 5:46.5 |
| 14 | Czechoslovakia Czechoslovakia I | Max Ippen & Eduard Novotný | 1:27.2 | 1:26.4 | 1:26.3 | 1:26.7 | 5:46.6 |
| 15 | Argentina Argentina I | Marcello de Ridder & Héctor Tomasi | 1:29.2 | 1:28.5 | 1:27.8 | 1:27.3 | 5:52.8 |
| - | Great Britain Great Britain II | Anthony Gadd & Basil Wellicome | 1:27.9 | 1:26.8 | fall | | DNF |
