= Great Britain at the 1948 Winter Olympics =

- Flag of the United Kingdom
- IOC code: GBR
- NOC: British Olympic Association

in St. Moritz
- Competitors: 55 (43 men, 12 women) in 6 sports
- Flag bearer: Henry Graham Sharp
- Medals Ranked 13th: Gold 0 Silver 0 Bronze 2 Total 2

Winter Olympics appearances (overview)
- 1924; 1928; 1932; 1936; 1948; 1952; 1956; 1960; 1964; 1968; 1972; 1976; 1980; 1984; 1988; 1992; 1994; 1998; 2002; 2006; 2010; 2014; 2018; 2022; 2026

The United Kingdom of Great Britain and Northern Ireland competed as Great Britain at the 1948 Winter Olympics in St. Moritz, Switzerland.

== Medallists ==
Medal	Name	Sport	Event
Bronze	Jeannette Altwegg	Figure skating	Women's singles
Bronze	John Crammond	Skeleton	Men's individual

== Alpine skiing ==
Men

Athlete	Event	Race 1		Race 2		Total	
Athlete	Event	Time	Rank	Time	Rank	Time	Rank
Peter Boumphrey	Men's downhill					DNF	–
Ian Appleyard	Men's downhill					4:25.2	91
Harry Taylor	Men's downhill					4:17.4	88
Stuart Parkinson	Men's downhill					4:03.0	81
James Palmer-Tomkinson	Men's downhill					3:54.1	74
Donald Garrow	Men's downhill					3:41.3	60
John Boyagis	Men's slalom	2:30.0	65	1:44.1	59	4:14.1	63
Harry Taylor	Men's slalom	2:05.5	59	2:04.4	65	4:09.9	61
Ian Appleyard	Men's slalom	1:47.0	53	1:33.1	54	3:20.1	55
Donald Garrow	Men's slalom	1:37.0	47	1:24.3	48	3:01.3	49

Men's combined

The downhill part of this event was held along with the main medal event of downhill skiing. For athletes competing in both events, the same time was used (see table above for the results). The slalom part of the event was held separate from the main medal event of slalom skiing (included in table below).

Athlete	Slalom			Total (downhill + slalom)	
Athlete	Time 1	Time 2	Rank	Points	Rank
James Palmer-Tomkinson	–	–	–	DNF	–
Donald Garrow	1:36.8 (+0:05)	1:26.3	44	46.98	45
Harry Taylor	1:45.8	1:37.8	62	75.99	61

Women

Athlete	Event	Race 1		Race 2		Total	
Athlete	Event	Time	Rank	Time	Rank	Time	Rank
Xanthe Ryder	Women's downhill					3:01.4	34
Sheena Mackintosh	Women's downhill					3:00.0	33
Rosemarie Sparrow	Women's downhill					2:52.3	30
Isobel Roe	Women's downhill					2:47.3	27
Bunty Greenland	Women's slalom	DNF	–	–	–	DNF	–
Bridget Duke-Wooley	Women's slalom	1:34.7	25	1:19.0	21	2:53.7	24
Isobel Roe	Women's slalom	1:24.5	23	1:25.1	24	2:49.6	23
Sheena Mackintosh	Women's slalom	1:10.5	18	1:20.4	22	2:30.9	21

Women's combined

The downhill part of this event was held along with the main medal event of downhill skiing. For athletes competing in both events, the same time was used (see table above for the results). The slalom part of the event was held separate from the main medal event of slalom skiing (included in table below).

Athlete	Slalom			Total (downhill + slalom)	
Athlete	Time 1	Time 2	Rank	Points	Rank
Isobel Roe	1:28.1	1:15.5	25	34.91	23
Xanthe Ryder	1:25.0	1:24.8	26	47.10	27
Rosemarie Sparrow	1:22.0	1:19.7	24	37.16	25
Sheena Mackintosh	1:10.9	1:19.0	23	36.00	24

== Bobsleigh ==
Sled	Athletes	Event	Run 1		Run 2		Run 3		Run 4		Total	
Sled	Athletes	Event	Time	Rank	Time	Rank	Time	Rank	Time	Rank	Time	Rank
GBR-1	William Coles; Raymond Collings	Two-man	1:25.2	7	1:24.4	4	1:24.2	9	1:24.1	5	5:37.9	5
GBR-2	Anthony Gadd; Basil Wellicome	Two-man	1:27.9	15	1:26.8	14	DNF	–	–	–	DNF	–

Sled	Athletes	Event	Run 1		Run 2		Run 3		Run 4		Total	
Sled	Athletes	Event	Time	Rank	Time	Rank	Time	Rank	Time	Rank	Time	Rank
GBR-1	William Coles; William McLean; Raymond Collings; George Holliday	Four-man	1:18.5	8	1:20.9	6	1:21.5	3	1:23.0	6	5:23.9	7
GBR-2	Richard Jeffrey; Edgar Meddings; George Powell-Sheddon; James Iremonger	Four-man	1:20.8	15	1:24.3	14	1:29.8	15	1:26.2	15	5:41.1	15

== Figure skating ==
Men

Athlete	CF	FS	Points	Places	Final rank
Henry Graham Sharp	6	8	167.044	67	7

Women

Athlete	CF	FS	Points	Places	Final rank
Maidie Jill Linzee	19	18	140.200	145	19
Marion Tiefy Davies	11	12	144.766	104	10
Bridget Shirly Adams	5	16	148.644	69	7
Jeannette Altwegg	2	6	156.166	28	3rd place, bronze medalist(s)

Pairs

Athletes	Points	Places	Final rank
Jennifer Nicks; John Nicks	9.700	98	8
Winifred Silverthorne; Dennis Silverthorne	10.572	53	5

== Ice hockey ==
The tournament was run in a round-robin format with nine teams participating.

	Pld	W	L	T	GF	GA	Pts
Canada	8	7	0	1	69	5	15
Czechoslovakia	8	7	0	1	80	18	15
Switzerland	8	6	2	0	67	21	12
Sweden	8	4	4	0	55	28	8
Great Britain 5th	8	3	5	0	39	47	6
Poland	8	2	6	0	29	97	4
Austria	8	1	7	0	33	77	2
Italy	8	0	8	0	24	156	0
United States *	8	5	3	0	86	33	10

* United States team was disqualified. Only eight teams are officially ranked.

- Great Britain 5-4 Austria
- Canada 3-0 Great Britain
- Czechoslovakia 11-4 Great Britain
- Switzerland 12-3 Great Britain
- Great Britain 7-2 Poland
- Sweden 4-3 Great Britain
- USA 4-3 Great Britain
- Great Britain 14-7 Italy

Contestants; Lennie Baker; George Baillie; Jimmy Chappell; Gerry Davey; Freddie Dunkelman; Art Green; Frankie Green; Frank Jardine; Johnny Murray; Johnny Oxley; Stan Simon; Bert Smith; Archie Stinchcombe; Tom Syme

== Skeleton ==
Athlete	Run 1		Run 2		Run 3		Run 4		Run 5		Run 6		Total	
Athlete	Time	Rank	Time	Rank	Time	Rank	Time	Rank	Time	Rank	Time	Rank	Time	Rank
Thomas Clarke	49.7	12	49.9	12	49.3	11	1:03.5	8	1:03.8	10	1:02.8	9	5:39.0	9
James Coates	48.8	8	48.7	7	49.0	9	1:02.3	7	1:01.7	7	1:01.4	6	5:31.9	7
Richard Bott	48.3	6	48.9	9	49.2	10	1:01.5	6	1:01.4	4	1:01.4	6	5:30.7	6
John Crammond	47.4	1	47.7	3	47.9	3	1:00.9	5	1:00.9	3	1:00.3	1	5:25.1	3rd place, bronze medalist(s)

== Speed skating ==
Men

Event	Athlete	Race	
Event	Athlete	Time	Rank
500 m	Henry Howes	46.9	35
500 m	Dennis Blundell	46.5	32
500 m	Bruce Peppin	46.4	29
500 m	Johnny Cronshey	46.0	25
1500 m	Tommy Ross	2:32.6	41
1500 m	Dennis Blundell	2:29.2	30
1500 m	Bruce Peppin	2:24.7	23
1500 m	Henry Howes	2:23.0	18
5000 m	Dennis Blundell	9:22.2	32
5000 m	Tommy Ross	9:18.3	28
5000 m	Henry Howes	8:56.6	19
5000 m	Johnny Cronshey	8:45.6	11
10,000 m	Henry Howes	DNF	–
10,000 m	Johnny Cronshey	DNF	–
