= France at the 1948 Winter Olympics =

- IOC code: FRA
- NOC: French Olympic Committee

in St. Moritz. Switzerland 30 January–9 February
- Competitors: 36 (28 men, 8 women) in 7 sports
- Flag bearers: James Couttet (alpine skiing, ski jumping)
- Medals Ranked 5th: Gold 2 Silver 1 Bronze 2 Total 5

Winter Olympics appearances (overview)
- 1924; 1928; 1932; 1936; 1948; 1952; 1956; 1960; 1964; 1968; 1972; 1976; 1980; 1984; 1988; 1992; 1994; 1998; 2002; 2006; 2010; 2014; 2018; 2022; 2026

France competed at the 1948 Winter Olympics in St. Moritz, Switzerland.

== Medalists ==
Medal	Name	Sport	Event
Gold	Henri Oreiller	Alpine skiing	Men's downhill
Gold	Henri Oreiller	Alpine skiing	Men's combined
Silver	James Couttet	Alpine skiing	Men's slalom
Bronze	Henri Oreiller	Alpine skiing	Men's slalom
Bronze	James Couttet	Alpine skiing	Men's combined

== Alpine skiing ==
Men

Athlete	Event	Race 1		Race 2		Total	
Athlete	Event	Time	Rank	Time	Rank	Time	Rank
Claude Penz	Downhill					3:19.2	34
Jean Pazzi	Downhill					3:16.1	33
Georges Panisset	Downhill					3:12.0	23
Guy de Huertas	Downhill					3:12.0	23
James Couttet	Downhill					3:07.3	13
Henri Oreiller	Downhill					2:55.0	1st place, gold medalist(s)
Claude Penz	Slalom	1:29.2 (+0:05)	38	1:10.9	25	2:40.1	38
Désiré Lacroix	Slalom	1:09.9	5	1:10.0	23	2:19.9	15
Henri Oreiller	Slalom	1:08.0	4	1:04.8	6	2:12.8	3rd place, bronze medalist(s)
James Couttet	Slalom	1:07.5	2	1:03.3	4	2:10.8	2nd place, silver medalist(s)

Men's combined

The downhill part of this event was held along with the main medal event of downhill skiing. For athletes competing in both events, the same time was used (see table above for the results). The slalom part of the event was held separate from the main medal event of slalom skiing (included in table below).

Athlete	Slalom			Total (downhill + slalom)	
Athlete	Time 1	Time 2	Rank	Points	Rank
Georges Panisset	1:19.8	1:15.5	18	18.38	18
Claude Penz	1:14.7	1:21.8	22	22.98	24
Henri Oreiller	1:12.3	1:10.0	5	3.27	1st place, gold medalist(s)
James Couttet	1:08.7	1:06.2	1	6.95	3rd place, bronze medalist(s)

Women

Athlete	Event	Race 1		Race 2		Total	
Athlete	Event	Time	Rank	Time	Rank	Time	Rank
Georgette Miller-Thiollière	Downhill					2:52.4	31
Micheline Desmazières	Downhill					2:50.2	29
Fernande Bayetto	Downhill					2:43.1	21
Lucienne Schmidt-Couttet	Downhill					2:35.2	10
Françoise Gignoux	Downhill					2:32.4	7
Suzanne Thiollière	Downhill					2:31.4	6
Françoise Gignoux	Slalom	1:05.0	10	1:05.3	16	2:10.3	12
Suzanne Thiollière	Slalom	1:01.1	6	DNF	–	DNF	–
Georgette Miller-Thiollière	Slalom	1:00.8	5	58.0	4	1:58.8	4
Lucienne Schmidt-Couttet	Slalom	1:00.1	3	1:20.5	23	2:20.6	20

Women's combined

The downhill part of this event was held along with the main medal event of downhill skiing. For athletes competing in both events, the same time was used (see table above for the results). The slalom part of the event was held separate from the main medal event of slalom skiing (included in table below).

Athlete	Slalom			Total (downhill + slalom)	
Athlete	Time 1	Time 2	Rank	Points	Rank
Suzanne Thiollière	1:15.0 (+0:05)	1:02.0	13	10.50	11
Lucienne Schmidt-Couttet	1:04.0	1:08.4	10	10.50	11
Georgette Miller-Thiollière	1:03.9	1:14.8 (+0:05)	16	25.79	20
Françoise Gignoux	1:03.8	1:05.2	5	8.14	5

== Bobsleigh ==
Sled	Athletes	Event	Run 1		Run 2		Run 3		Run 4		Total	
Sled	Athletes	Event	Time	Rank	Time	Rank	Time	Rank	Time	Rank	Time	Rank
FRA-1	Achille Fould; Henri Evrot	Two-man	1:25.8	10	1:25.3	12	1:24.7	11	1:24.6	10	5:40.4	11
FRA-2	William Hirigoyen; Louis Saint-Calbre	Two-man	1:25.8	10	1:25.0	8	1:24.9	12	1:24.8	11	5:40.5	12

Sled	Athletes	Event	Run 1		Run 2		Run 3		Run 4		Total	
Sled	Athletes	Event	Time	Rank	Time	Rank	Time	Rank	Time	Rank	Time	Rank
FRA-1	René Charlet; Jean Morin; Jacques Descatoire; Amédée Ronzel	Four-man	1:18.9	9	1:22.2	9	1:23.8	11	1:24.5	10	5:29.4	9
FRA-2	Gilbert Achard-Picard; Félix Bonnat; Louis Saint-Calbre; Henri Evrot	Four-man	1:20.7	14	1:24.7	15	1:24.7	13	1:25.3	13	5:35.4	13

== Cross-country skiing ==
Men

Event	Athlete	Race	
Event	Athlete	Time	Rank
18 km	Walter Jeandel	1'34:19	71
18 km	Paul Bouveret	1'28:07	48
18 km	André Buffard	1'27:18	44
18 km	René Jeandel	1'25:57	42
18 km	Marius Mora	1'25:06	37
18 km	Benoît Carrara	1'20:03	11

Men's 4 x 10 km relay

Athletes	Race	
Athletes	Time	Rank
René Jeandel; Gérard Perrier; Marius Mora; Benoît Carrara	2'51:53	7

== Figure skating ==
Women

Athlete	CF	FS	Points	Places	Final rank
Jacqueline du Bief	16	21	139.022	147.5	16

Pairs

Athletes	Points	Places	Final rank
Denise Favart; Jacques Favart	8.700	139	14

== Nordic combined ==
Events:

- 18 km cross-country skiing
- normal hill ski jumping

The cross-country skiing part of this event was combined with the main medal event, meaning that athletes competing here were skiing for two disciplines at the same time. Details can be found above in this article, in the cross-country skiing section.

The ski jumping (normal hill) event was held separately from the main medal event of ski jumping, results can be found in the table below. Athletes would perform three jumps, of which the two best jumps (distance and form) were counted.

Athlete	Event	Cross-country		Ski Jumping					Total	
Athlete	Event	Points	Rank	Distance 1	Distance 2	Distance 3	Points	Rank	Points	Rank
Walter Jeandel	Individual	147.00	31	60.5	59.0	59.5	192.6	21	339.60	30
René Jeandel	Individual	189.00	19	52.0	54.0	56.5	182.1	28	371.10	19

== Skeleton ==
Athlete	Run 1		Run 2		Run 3		Run 4		Run 5		Run 6		Total	
Athlete	Time	Rank	Time	Rank	Time	Rank	Time	Rank	Time	Rank	Time	Rank	Time	Rank
William Gayraud-Hirigoyen	52.7	13	49.9	12	51.0	13	DNF	–	–	–	–	–	DNF	–

== Ski jumping ==
Athlete	Event	Distance 1	Distance 2	Total points	Rank
James Couttet	Normal hill	54.5	58.0	194.3	25
Jean Monnier	Normal hill	56.0	60.0	188.5	31
Régis Charlet	Normal hill	58.0	59.5	193.7	26
Arsène Lucchini	Normal hill	62.5	65.5	198.0	22
