= Skeleton at the 1948 Winter Olympics =

Skeleton at the V Olympic Winter Games
- Venue: Cresta Run
- Competitors: 15 from 6 nations

Medalists
| 1st place, gold medalist(s) | | Nino Bibbia | Italy |
| 2nd place, silver medalist(s) | | John Heaton | United States |
| 3rd place, bronze medalist(s) | | John Crammond | Great Britain |

Medals awarded for the skeleton discipline at the 1948 Winter Olympics held in St Moritz. At that time the sport was called cresta, and St. Moritz had the most famous Cresta Run, dating to 1884. In many locations the sport was referred to as tobogganing during these and the 1928 Games. The contest was run over a total of six runs.

== Medalists ==
| Gold | Nino Bibbia; Italy |
| Silver | John Heaton; United States |
| Bronze | John Crammond; Great Britain |

Turn 10 at Cesana Pariol, where the bobsled, luge, and skeleton competitions took place for the 2006 Winter Olympics in Turin, Italy, is named for Bibbia.

John Heaton also won the silver medal in skeleton at the 1928 Winter Olympics.

== Results ==
| Rank | Name | Country | Run 1 | Run 2 | Run 3 | Run 4 | Run 5 | Run 6 | Total | Diff. |
|---|---|---|---|---|---|---|---|---|---|---|
| 1 | Nino Bibbia | Italy | 0:48.8 | 0:47.6 | 0:47.6 | 0:59.5 | 1:00.2 | 1:00.3 | 5:23.2 | — |
| 2 | John Heaton | United States | 0:48.1 | 0:47.4 | 0:47.7 | 1:00.0 | 1:00.2 | 1:01.2 | 5:24.6 | +1.4 |
| 3 | John Crammond | Great Britain | 0:47.4 | 0:47.7 | 0:47.9 | 1:00.9 | 1:00.9 | 1:00.3 | 5:25.1 | +1.9 |
| 4 | Wilbur Lee Martin | United States | 0:47.8 | 0:49.2 | 0:48.2 | 1:00.7 | 1:01.6 | 1:00.5 | 5:28.0 | +4.8 |
| 5 | Gottfried Kägi | Switzerland | 0:48.9 | 0:48.8 | 0:48.7 | 1:00.8 | 1:01.6 | 1:01.1 | 5:29.9 | +6.7 |
| 6 | Richard Bott | Great Britain | 0:48.3 | 0:48.9 | 0:49.2 | 1:01.5 | 1:01.4 | 1:01.4 | 5:30.7 | +7.5 |
| 7 | James Coats | Great Britain | 0:48.8 | 0:48.7 | 0:49.0 | 1:02.3 | 1:01.7 | 1:01.4 | 5:31.9 | +8.7 |
| 8 | Fairchilds Maccarthy | United States | 0:48.8 | 0:48.3 | 0:49.4 | 1:03.6 | 1:02.7 | 1:02.7 | 5:35.5 | +12.3 |
| 9 | Thomas Clarke | Great Britain | 0:49.7 | 0:49.9 | 0:49.3 | 1:03.5 | 1:03.8 | 1:02.8 | 5:39.0 | +15.8 |
| 10 | C. William Johnson | United States | 0:47.7 | 0:48.4 | 0:48.0 | did not start | | | — | — |
| 11 | Milo Bigler | Switzerland | 0:48.4 | 0:48.4 | 0:48.7 | did not start | | | — | — |
| 12 | Dialma Balsegia | Switzerland | 0:49.2 | 0:49.0 | 0:48.6 | did not start | | | — | — |
| 13 | William Hirigoyen | France | 0:52.7 | 0:49.9 | 0:51.0 | did not start | | | — | — |
| | Christian Fischbacher | Switzerland | unknown | | | did not start | | | — | — |
| | Hugo Kuranda | Austria | unknown | | | did not start | | | — | — |

== Medal table ==
| Rank | Nation | Gold | Silver | Bronze | Total |
|---|---|---|---|---|---|
| 1 | Italy | 1 | 0 | 0 | 1 |
| 2 | United States | 0 | 1 | 0 | 1 |
| 3 | Great Britain | 0 | 0 | 1 | 1 |
| Totals (3 entries) | | 1 | 1 | 1 | 3 |
