= Bobsleigh at the 1948 Winter Olympics =

Bobsleigh at the V Olympic Winter Games
- Venue: St. Moritz, Switzerland
- Dates: 30-31 January 1948 (two-man); 6-7 February 1948 (four-man)
- Competitors: 71 from 9 nations

At the 1948 Winter Olympics, two bobsleigh events were contested. The two-man competition was held on Friday, January 30, 1948 and on Saturday, January 31, 1948 while the four-man competition was held on Friday, February 6, 1948 and on Saturday, February 7, 1948.

== Medal summary ==
Event	Gold	Silver	Bronze
Two-man	Switzerland; Switzerland II; Felix Endrich; Friedrich Waller	Switzerland; Switzerland I Fritz Feierabend; Paul Eberhard	United States; USA II; Frederick Fortune; Schuyler Carron
Four-man	United States; USA II; Francis Tyler; Patrick Martin; Edward Rimkus; William D'Amico	Belgium; Belgium I Max Houben; Freddy Mansveld; Louis-Georges Niels; Jacques Mouvet	United States; USA I James Bickford; Thomas Hicks; Donald Dupree; William Dupree

== Participating nations ==
Twenty-one bobsledders competed in both events.

A total of 71 bobsledders from nine nations competed at the St. Moritz Games:

- Argentina (4)
- Belgium (5)
- Czechoslovakia (4)
- France (10)
- Great Britain (10)
- Italy (10)
- Norway (8)
- Switzerland (8)
- United States (12)

== Medal table ==
Rank	Nation	Gold	Silver	Bronze	Total
1	Switzerland	1	1	0	2
2	United States	1	0	2	3
3	Belgium	0	1	0	1
Totals (3 entries)		2	2	2	6
