= Airoldi =

Airoldi is an Italian surname. Notable people with the surname include:

- Carlo Airoldi (1869–1929), Italian marathon runner
- Carlo Francesco Airoldi (1637–1683), Roman Catholic prelate
- Cian Airoldi, Italian-Irish Performer and Songwriter
- Edoardo Airoldi (born 1974), Italian-American professor of statistics and data science
- Enrico Airoldi (1923–1994), Italian bobsledder
- Joan Airoldi, American librarian
- Julien Airoldi (1900–1974), French politician
- Remo Airoldi (1921–?), Italian bobsledder
- Roberto Airoldi (born 1976), Italian paralympic archer
