= Jeandel =

Jeandel is a French surname. Notable people with the surname include:

- Catherine Jeandel, French geochemical oceanographer
- René Jeandel (1924–2018), French cross-country and Nordic combined skier
- Walter Jeandel (1918–2012), French cross-country and Nordic combined skier, brother of René
