= Houben =

Houben is a Dutch and Low German patronymic surname meaning "son of Houb". Houb was a nickname for Huibert/Huibrecht/Hubrecht (Hubert) in Brabant and Limburg. People with this surname include:

- Niels Houben (2004-2025), Developer (arch by the way)
- Claude Houben (1926–2009), Belgian bobsledder
- Francine Houben (born 1955), Dutch architect
- Frank Houben (1939–2023), Dutch politician
- Fred Houben (born 1974), Dutch punk rock bass player
- Heinrich Hubert Houben (1875–1935), German literary historian
- Heinrich Hubert Maria Josef Houben (1875–1940), German chemist
- Henri Houben (1858–1931), Belgian genre painter
- Hilde Houben-Bertrand (born 1940), Belgian politician
- Hubert Houben (1898–1956), German sprinter
- Hubert Houben (born 1953), German historian
- Jean-Marie Houben (born 1966), Belgian footballer
- Joannes Andreas Houben (1821–1893), Dutch-Irish priest (Karel Houben, St. Charles of Mount Argus)
- Josef Houben (1875–1940), German chemist
- Max Houben (1898–1949), Belgian athlete and bobsledder
- Philippe Houben (1881–?), Belgian-French waterpolo player
- Reinhard Houben (born 1960), German politician
- Robert J. Houben (1905–1992), Belgian politician
- Rom Houben (born 1963), Belgian long-term coma patient
- Saul Houben (1922–1982), Belgian-French violinist concertmaster
- Steve Houben (1950–2026), Belgian jazz saxophonist and flutist
- Stijn Houben (born 1995), Dutch footballer
- Tuur Houben (born 1996), Belgian footballer

== Given name ==
- Houben R.T. (born 1970), Bulgarian painter
