= Tuffy Latour =

Tuffy Latour may refer to:

- Tuffield A. Latour (1909–1965), American Olympic bobsledder
- Tuffield Latour (born c. 1968), American bobsledder, grandson of Tuffield A. Latour
