= Christian Fischbacher =

Swiss skeleton racer (1913–2006)

Christian H. Fischbacher (February 13, 1913 – January 2, 2006) was a Swiss skeleton racer who competed in the late 1940s. He competed in the skeleton event at the 1948 Winter Olympics in St. Moritz, but did not finish.
