= Pat Buckley =

Pat Buckley may refer to:

- Patricia Buckley (1926–2007), Canadian socialite and wife of William F. Buckley, Jr.
- Patricia Buckley Bozell (1927–2008), American writer and sister of William F. Buckley, Jr.
- Patricia Buckley Ebrey (born 1947), American historian of Chinese culture and gender studies
- Paddy Buckley (1925–2008), Scottish international footballer
- Pat Buckley (footballer) (born 1946), Scottish footballer, son of the above
- Pat Buckley (priest) (1952–2024), excommunicated Irish Catholic priest
- Patrick Buckley (politician) (1841–1896), Irish New Zealand soldier, lawyer, politician
- Pat Buckley (Irish politician) (born 1969), Irish politician
- Pat Buckley (bobsleigh), American bobsleigher
- Pat Buckley (Aghabullogue hurler), Irish hurler
- Pat Buckley (Cork hurler) (born 1965), Irish hurler

== See also ==
- Patrick Buckley (disambiguation)
