= George Powell-Shedden =

Royal Air Force pilot

George Ffolliott Powell-Shedden
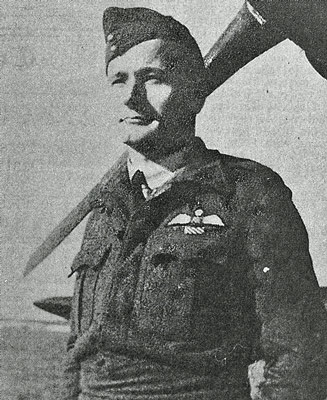
- Born: 1 April 1916; Cowes, Isle of Wight
- Died: 31 October 1994 (aged 78); London, England
- Military career
- Allegiance: United Kingdom
- Branch: Royal Air Force
- Service years: 1934–1961
- Rank: Group captain
- Nickname: "FoFo"
- Commands: RAF Jever (1952–54); No. 29 Squadron (1944); Malta Night Fighter Unit (1941); No. 615 (County of Surrey) Squadron (1941)
- Conflicts: Second World War: Battle of Britain; Invasion of Normandy
- Awards: Distinguished Service Order; Distinguished Flying Cross

George Ffolliott Powell-Shedden, DSO, DFC (1 April 1916 – 31 October 1994) was a Royal Air Force pilot who flew during the Battle of Britain and later went on to operational commands. He was also an Olympic bobsledder who competed for Britain in the late 1940s.

== Early life ==
Born George Ffolliott Powell on 1 April 1916 in Cowes on the Isle of Wight, he was the son of Lieutenant Colonel Richmond Ffolliott Powell DSO (1880–1956) and Alice Katherine Beatrix Shedden. Powell-Shedden was youngest of three brothers: Richmond Roscow Ffolliott Powell (born 1909); and Atherton George Ffolliott Powell (born 1912), who later became a lieutenant colonel in the Royal Welch Fusiliers. He had one sister, Rosemary Beatrix Ffolliot Powell. He assumed the surname of Powell-Shedden by deed poll of 9 August 1938.

Powell-Shedden was educated at Wellington College, where he became a sergeant in the Officers' Training Corps. After leaving school he entered the Royal Military Academy, Woolwich, but then switched to the Royal Air Force College Cranwell where he was commissioned on 19 December 1936.

== Royal Air Force ==
In 1937 he was posted to No. 47 Squadron RAF, flying Vickers Vincent aircraft based at Khartoum. In 1939 he was transferred to No. 33 Squadron RAF, a fighter squadron equipped with Gloster Gladiator biplanes for policing Palestine.

=== Battle of Britain ===
During the Battle of Britain Powell-Shedden served as blue flight commander in Group Captain Douglas Bader's No. 242 Squadron RAF. Though somewhat large for a Hawker Hurricane cockpit, and having a stutter, Powell-Shedden was recommended to Bader as "a very good type".

"Stutters! Stutters!", Bader exploded, "that's no damn good to me. What's going to happen over the radio in a fight?" Told that Powell-Shedden was a Cranwell man, though, Bader changed his mind. "Just the chap", he agreed, "send him along".

Powell-Shedden joined the squadron June 1940. Powell-Shedden shot down at least four enemy aircraft. He was promoted to flight lieutenant on 19 June 1940.

On 15 September 1940, now known as Battle of Britain Day, it was reported that Powell-Shedden was missing. It transpired that he had shot down a Dornier bomber and was chasing another when a Messerschmitt Bf 109 came out of cloud behind him and set his Hurricane on fire. While baling out he hit the tail and dislocated a shoulder.

After the Battle of Britain Powell-Shedden was sent to No. 258 Squadron RAF, another Hurricane squadron, as a flight commander; the next April he received his first command—that of No. 615 (County of Surrey) Squadron, an Auxiliary Air Force Hurricane squadron.

=== Malta ===
In July 1941 Powell-Shedden was posted to the island of Malta, where he formed the Malta Night Fighter Unit, a handful of Hurricanes working with searchlight and anti-aircraft gun crews.

Powell-Shedden was promoted to the rank of squadron leader (temporary) on 1 September 1941. In December 1941, he was awarded the Distinguished Flying Cross (DFC) "in recognition of gallantry displayed in flying operations against the enemy". The full citation read:

This officer has been involved in operations almost since the start of the war began. He served with a fighter squadron in the Middle East theatre of war until June, 1940, when he returned to this country and took part in the Battle of Britain. In July, 1941, Squadron Leader Powell Shedden was posted to Malta where he formed the night flying unit which has since performed sterling work in the night defence of Malta. By his great and energetic organising ability, together with his courage and initiative in the air, Squadron Leader Powell Shedden has contributed materially to the successes obtained. He has destroyed at least 5 enemy aircraft 3 of which were during the Battle of Britain.

=== D-Day ===
In January 1944, after further courses and staff appointments, he resumed operational flying with No. 96 Squadron RAF, a Mosquito squadron, and then took command of No. 29 Squadron RAF, a Mosquito squadron specialising in low-level night intruder missions before and after D-Day. He was awarded the Distinguished Service Order (DSO) on 27 April 1945. He was promoted to wing commander (war substantive) on 23 August 1945.

=== Command appointments ===
In 1952 Powell-Shedden received command of RAF Jever in Germany and was promoted to the rank of group captain on 1 January 1954. From 1954 to 1957 served on the operational staff at Naples. He was posted to the Air Ministry in 1958, and retired from the RAF in 1961.

== Bobsledding ==
Powell-Shedden was also a bobsledder who competed for Britain in the late 1940s. At the 1948 Winter Olympics in St. Moritz, he finished 15th in the four-man event, with teammates James Iremonger, Edgar Meddings and Richard Jeffrey.

== Later life ==
Powell-Shedden retired in 1961 to join the Stock Exchange (Hoblyn & King) and to farm in Buckinghamshire. He was twice married, to Diana and Marietta, and had a son, Henry, and a daughter, Angela. He died on 31 October 1994 in London.
