= Hugo Kuranda =

Austrian skeleton racer

Hugo Kuranda (born 29 May 1910; date of death unknown) was an Austrian skeleton racer who competed in the late 1940s. He competed in the skeleton event at the 1948 Winter Olympics in St. Moritz, but did not finish.
