= Schroen =

Schroen is a surname. Notable people with the surname include:

- Francis C. Schroen (1857–1924), German-born American Jesuit interior designer and painter
- Gary Schroen (1941–2022), American CIA officer

== See also ==
- Schrøen
- Schron
- Schrön
