= Milo Bigler =

Swiss skeleton racer (1914–1989)

Milo Bigler (October 2, 1914 – October 1989) was a Swiss skeleton racer who competed in the late 1940s. He finished 11th in the skeleton event at the 1948 Winter Olympics in St. Moritz.
