= Jean Morin =

Jean Morin may refer to:

- Jean Morin (theologian) (1591–1659), French theologian and biblical scholar
- Jean Morin (artist) (c. 1595 - 1650), French painter, etcher and engraver
- Jean Morin (bobsleigh) (1901–?), French Olympic bobsledder
- Jean Morin (ice hockey) (born 1963), Canadian National Hockey League linesman

== See also ==
- Jean-Baptiste Morin (disambiguation)
- Jean-Louis Morin (disambiguation)
