= Descatoire =

Descatoire is a French surname. Notable people with the surname include:

- Alexandre Descatoire (1874–1949), French sculptor
- Jacques Descatoire (1920–1984), French bobsledder
