= Dialma Balsegia =

Swiss skeleton racer

Dialma Balsegia (born 11 March 1900; date of death unknown) was a Swiss skeleton racer who competed in the late 1940s. He finished 12th in the skeleton event at the 1948 Winter Olympics in St. Moritz.
