= Robert Dumont =

Robert Dumont may refer to:

- Robert Dumont (bobsleigh) (fl. 1947), French bobsledder
- Robert V. Dumont Jr. (1940–1997), Native American educational leader
