= FIBT World Championships 1947 =

Winter sport competition

1947 World Championships
- Location: St. Moritz, Switzerland; Cortina d'Ampezzo, Italy

The FIBT World Championships 1947 took place in St. Moritz, Switzerland for the record sixth time after hosting the event previously in 1931 (Four-man), 1935 (Four-man), 1937 (Four-man), 1938 (Two-man), and 1939 (Two-man). It marked the first time both bobsleigh events were competed at the same venue in the championships and was also the first event held after the end of World War II.

== Two man bobsleigh ==
Pos	Team	Time
Gold	Switzerland (Fritz Feierabend, Stephan Waser)	
Silver	Switzerland (Felix Endrich, Fritz Waller)	
Bronze	Belgium (Max Houben, Jacques Mouvet)	

== Four man bobsleigh ==
Pos	Team	Time
Gold	Switzerland (Fritz Feierabend, Heinz Cattani, Alphonse Hörning, Joseph Beerli)	
Silver	Belgium (Max Houben, Claude Houben, Albert Lerat, Jacques Mouvet)	
Bronze	France (Achille Fould, Henri Evrot, Robert Dumont, William Hirigoyen)	

== Medal table ==
Rank	Nation	Gold	Silver	Bronze	Total
1	Switzerland (SUI)	2	1	0	3
2	Belgium (BEL)	0	1	1	2
3	France (FRA)	0	0	1	1
Totals (3 entries)		2	2	2	6
