= C. William Johnson =

American skeleton racer (1917–1993)

Charles William Johnson (February 12, 1917 – April 11, 1993) was an American skeleton racer who competed in the late 1940s. He finished tenth in the skeleton event at the 1948 Winter Olympics in St. Moritz.
