= John McDonald (bobsleigh) =

American bobsledder

Medal record

Bobsleigh

World Championships
Bronze medal – third place	1949 Lake Placid	Two-man

John McDonald is an American bobsledder who competed in the late 1940s. He won a bronze medal in the two-man event at the 1949 FIBT World Championships in Lake Placid, New York.
