= Jean-Baptiste Morin =

Jean-Baptiste Morin may refer to:

- Jean-Baptiste Morin (mathematician) (1583–1656), French astrologer, mathematician and astronomer
- Jean-Baptiste Morin (composer) (1677–1745), French composer
- Jean-Baptiste Morin (politician) (1840–1911), Canadian politician

== See also ==
- Jean Morin (disambiguation)
