= William Casey (bobsleigh) =

American bobsledder

Medal record

Bobsleigh

World Championships
Gold medal – first place	1949 Lake Placid	Four-man

William Casey (born c. 1915, date of death unknown) was an American bobsledder who competed in the late 1940s. He won the gold medal in the four-man event at the 1949 FIBT World Championships in Lake Placid, New York. Casey was from Philadelphia.
