= Henry Sterns =

American bobsledder

Medal record

Bobsleigh

World Championships
Silver medal – second place	1949 Lake Placid	Four-man

Henry Sterns was an American bobsledder who competed in the late 1940s. He won a silver medal in the four-man event at the 1949 FIBT World Championships in Lake Placid, New York.
