= John Crammond =

British skeleton racer

Olympic medal record

Men's Skeleton
Bronze medal – third place	1948 St. Moritz	single

John Gordon Crammond (5 July 1906 – 18 September 1978) was a British skeleton racer who competed in the late 1940s. He won the bronze medal in the men's skeleton event at the 1948 Winter Olympics in St. Moritz.
