= Tuffield Latour =

American bobsled and skeleton coach (born 1968)

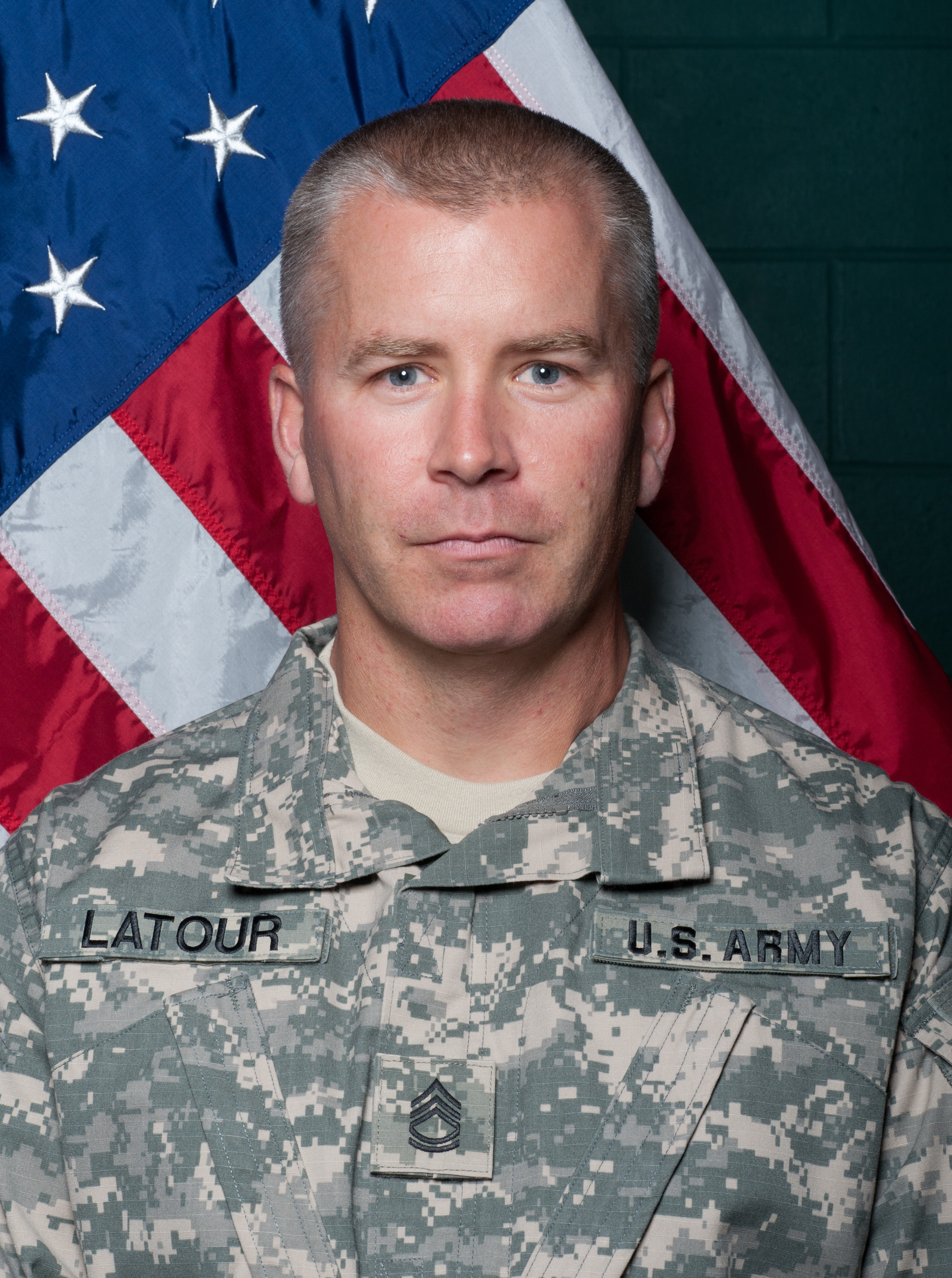
- Tuffy Latour in 2013

Personal information
- Born: 1968 (age 57–58)
- Education: Ashford University, Liberty University

Sport
- Sport: Bobsled, skeleton
- Club: U.S. Army

Tuffield "Tuffy" Latour (born c. 1968) is an American bobsled and skeleton coach and retired bobsledder. His best achievement as a competitor was ninth place in the four-man event at the 1995 World Championships. He later coached the U.S. women's bobsled team (ca. 2000–2002), U.S. men's bobsled team (ca. 2003–2004), Canadian bobsled team (ca. 2009–2010) and U.S. skeleton team (2010–present). His efforts resulted in six Olympic (2002, 2010 and 2014) and at least six world championships medals, including the first-ever women's bobsled Olympic gold for the United States.

Latour is a Sergeant first class serving with the Vermont National Guard. He holds a bachelor's degree in organizational management from Ashford University and an MSc degree in sport management from Liberty University. He is married to Kathy and has two children. His grandfather, Tuffield A. Latour, was an Olympic bobsledder.
