= Patrick Buckley =

Patrick Buckley may refer to:

- Paddy Buckley (1925–2008), Scottish international footballer
- Patrick Buckley (politician) (1841–1896), Irish New Zealand soldier, lawyer, politician

== See also ==
- Pat Buckley (disambiguation)
