= Albert Lerat =

Belgian bobsledder

Medal record

Bobsleigh

World Championships
Silver medal – second place	1947 St. Moritz	Four-man

Albert Lerat was a Belgian bobsledder who competed in the late 1940s. He won the silver medal in the four-man event at the 1947 FIBT World Championships in St. Moritz.
