= Richard Bott (skeleton racer) =

British skeleton racer (1900–1980)

Richard Bott (30 May 1900 in Bideford, Devonshire, England – 19 May 1980 in Watford, Hertfordshire, England) was an English skeleton racer who competed in the late 1940s. He finished sixth in the men's skeleton event at the 1948 Winter Olympics in St. Moritz.
