= Thomas Clarke (skeleton racer) =

British skeleton racer

Thomas Clarke (November 19, 1911 – February 14, 1969) was a British skeleton racer and racing driver who competed from the 1930s to the 1950ws. He finished ninth in the skeleton event at the 1948 Winter Olympics in St. Moritz.

Clarke took part in the Le Mans 24-hour race three times (1935, 1950-51), finishing eighth on two occasions. He also took part in the 1936 French and Donnington Grands Prix, and contested that year’s Mille Miglia.
