= Jean-Louis Morin =

Jean-Louis Morin may refer to:

- Jean-Louis Morin (dancer) (1953–1995), Canadian choreographer and the principal dancer for the Martha Graham Dance Company
- Jean-Louis Morin (porcelain painter) (1732–1787), French porcelain painter

== See also ==
- Jean Morin (disambiguation)
