= Gian Carlo Ronchetti =

Italian bobsledder (1913–1991)

Giancarlo Ronchetti (29 June 1913 – 9 June 1991) was an Italian bobsledder who competed in the late 1940s. At the 1948 Winter Olympics in St. Moritz, he finished sixth in the four-man event.
