= Henry Howes =

British speed skater (1928–2025)

Personal information
- Full name: Henry James Howes
- Nationality: British
- Born: 11 October 1928 Brentford, England
- Died: September 2025 (aged 96)

Sport
- Sport: Speed skating

Henry James Howes (11 October 1928 – September 2025) was a British speed skater. He competed in four events at the 1948 Winter Olympics. Howes died in September 2025, at the age of 96.
