= Robert Dumont (bobsleigh) =

French bobsledder

Medal record

Bobsleigh

World Championships
Bronze medal – third place	1947 St. Moritz	Four-man

Robert Dumont was a French bobsledder who competed in the late 1940s. He won a bronze medal in the four-man event at the 1947 FIBT World Championships in St. Moritz.
