= Jacques Mouvet =

Belgian bobsledder

Personal information
- Born: 16 December 1912
- Died: 27 January 1993 (aged 80)

Sport
- Sport: Bobsled
Medal record
Representing Belgium
Olympic Games
Silver medal – second place	1948 St. Moritz	Four-man
World Championships
Silver medal – second place	1947 St. Moritz	Four-man
Bronze medal – third place	1947 St. Moritz	Two-man

Jacques Mouvet (16 December 1912 – 27 January 1993) was a Belgian bobsledder. He won a silver medal in the four-man event at the 1948 Winter Olympics in St. Moritz and finished fourth in the two-man event at those same games. Mouvet also earned two medals at the 1947 FIBT World Championships in St. Moritz with a silver in the four-man and a bronze in the two-man event.

When competing in two-man events, Mouvet was the brakesman of Max Houben. During a practice run at the 1949 FIBT World Championships, their sled catapulted off of "shady" corner at the Lake Placid bobsleigh, luge, and skeleton track. Houben was killed instantly while Mouvet survived with a broken skull and a serious back injury.
