= Marius Mora =

French cross-country skier (1921–2006)

Personal information
- Full name: Louis Marius Mora
- Nationality: French
- Born: 23 June 1921; Les Rousses, France
- Died: 22 February 2006 (aged 84); Chamonix-Mont-Blanc, France

Sport
- Sport: Cross-country

Louis Marius Mora (23 June 1921 – 22 February 2006) was a French cross-country skier who competed in the 1948 Winter Olympics.
