= Félix Bonnat =

French bobsledder

Personal information
- Full name: Félix Louis Gaston Bonnat
- Nationality: French
- Born: 23 April 1921; Voiron, France
- Died: 16 May 2013 (aged 92); Saint-Cassien, France

Sport
- Sport: bobsled

Félix Bonnat (23 April 1921 – 16 May 2013) was a French bobsledder who competed in the late 1940s. He finished 13th in the four-man event at the 1948 Winter Olympics in St. Moritz. During World War II, he was imprisoned in both the Natzweiler-Struthof and Dachau concentration camps.
