= Louis Saint-Calbre =

French bobsledder

Personal information
- Full name: Pierre Georges Louis Saint-Calbre
- Nationality: French
- Born: 6 July 1912; Pomarez, France
- Died: 28 February 1970 (aged 57); Paris, France

Sport
- Sport: bobsled

Louis Saint-Calibre (July 6, 1912 – February 28, 1970) was a French bobsledder who competed in the late 1940s. At the 1948 Winter Olympics in St. Moritz, he finished 12th in the two-man event as well as 13th in the four-man event.

Four years later he finished eleventh in the four-man event at the 1952 Winter Olympics.

Saint-Calibre later was involved in the unsuccessful design for the bobsleigh course to be used for the 1960 Winter Olympics in Squaw Valley, specifically with costs related to the course itself (USD300,000) instead of the course and its supporting area (grandstands, scoreboard, lighting, tramway, etc. which raised the cost to USD700,000). A letter of protest was sent from the 1960 Organizing Committee to the International Bobsleigh and Tobogganing Federation (FIBT) in late 1957 that was published in the February 1958 Olympic Review. This issue would lead to bobsleigh's exclusion from the 1960 program.
