= Anthony Gadd =

British bobsledder

Anthony Gadd (26 October 1917 – 13 July 1996) was a British bobsledder who competed in the late 1940s. At the 1948 Winter Olympics in St. Moritz, he competed in the two-man event, but fell during the third run and did not finish.
