= Wilbur Martin =

American skeleton racer (1928–1984)

Personal information
- Nationality: American
- Born: July 8, 1928
- Died: August 19, 1984 (aged 56)

Sport
- Sport: Skeleton racing

Wilbur Lee Martin (July 8, 1928 – August 19, 1984) was an American skeleton racer who competed in the late 1940s. He finished fourth in the men's skeleton event at the 1948 Winter Olympics in St. Moritz.
