= Fairchilds Maccarthy =

American skeleton racer (1896–1977)

Farchild Maccarthy was born in Muskegon, Michigan (May 28, 1896 – March 1977) was an American skeleton racer who competed in the late 1940s. He finished eighth in the men's skeleton event at the 1948 Winter Olympics in St. Moritz.

A cup competition on the Cresta Run in St. Moritz is named in his honor.
