= Gilbert Achard-Picard =

French bobsledder

Gilbert Achard-Picard (June 17, 1918 – August 17, 1954) was a French bobsledder who competed in the late 1940s. He finished 13th in the four-man event at the 1948 Winter Olympics in St. Moritz.
