= Richard Solem =

American speed skater

Personal information
- Nationality: American
- Born: June 21, 1926 Chicago, Illinois, United States
- Died: August 6, 2007 (aged 81) Scottsdale, Arizona, United States

Sport
- Sport: Speed skating

Richard Solem (June 21, 1926 – August 6, 2007) was an American speed skater. He competed in two events at the 1948 Winter Olympics.
