= Stan Simon =

British ice hockey player

Personal information
- Nationality: British
- Born: 9 July 1920; Kew, London, England
- Died: February 1993 (aged 72); York, England

Sport
- Sport: Ice hockey

Stanley Paul Simon (9 July 1920 – February 1993) was a British ice hockey player. He competed in the men's tournament at the 1948 Winter Olympics.
