= Tommy Ross (speed skater) =

British speed skater

Personal information
- Full name: Thomas Cochrane Ross
- Nationality: British
- Born: 1 September 1927 Glasgow, Scotland
- Died: 19 February 2021 (aged 93)

Sport
- Sport: Speed skating

Thomas Cochrane "Tommy" Ross (1 September 1927 – 19 February 2021) was a British speed skater. He competed in two events at the 1948 Winter Olympics. Ross emigrated to the United States in 1953, becoming a naturalised citizen in 1963. He married Rita Paton in 1954 in New York. The couple settled in Evanston, Illinois, where he worked as a tool maker.
