= Bruce Peppin =

British speed skater (1924–2019)

Bruce Harry Peppin (21 November 1924 – 11 May 2019) was a British former speed skater who competed in the 1948 Winter Olympics.
