= Julien Airoldi =

French politician

Member of the National Assembly
- In office 21 October 1945 – 4 July 1951
- Constituency: Rhône

Personal details
- Born: 27 May 1900; Deluz, France
- Died: 3 December 1974 (aged 74); Saint-Genis-Laval, France
- Political party: Communist

Julien Airoldi (27 May 1900 – 3 December 1974) was a French politician who served in the National Constituent Assembly and National Assembly from the department of Rhône from 21 October 1945 to 4 July 1951.

== Early life and education ==
Julien Airoldi was born in Deluz, France, on 27 May 1900, to Jean Airoldi and Marie Graizely. After completing his education he worked as a farmer and then in a factory in Besançon. He participated in a labour strike in 1917, and joined the General Confederation of Labour's metal union in 1919.

During Airoldi's mandatory military service he served in Haguenau and participated in the occupation of the Ruhr. After leaving the military he was hired at the Fives-Lille factory in Givors and became secretary of the union. In 1925, he moved to Oullins after he lost his job due to a lockout. He married Violette Escure in 1930, but they later divorced her after the end of World War II.

== Early career ==
Airoldi joined the French Communist Party (PCF) on 1 May 1924. He rose in the ranks of the PCF and was sent to Moscow from 1932 to 1934, to receive training at the International Lenin School. Waldeck Rochet was succeeded as secretary of the Rhône PCF. He joined the central committee of the PCF as an alternate member in 1937. From March to September 1939, he was assigned to the Communist International as a secretariat.

In the 1935 Oullins local elections, Airoldi ran as the first candidate on the PCF's electoral list, but withdrew in the second round in favour of the socialists, who won. In the 1936 election he was a candidate for a seat in the Chamber of Deputies in the 11th constituency of Rhône, but withdrew in the second round in favour of the socialists, who won.

The signing of the Molotov–Ribbentrop Pact led to Airoldi's arreste on 23 October 1939. He was sentenced to two years in prison in June 1940, for "intelligence and action for the benefit of a foreign power". His sentence was served at prisons in Dardilly, Lyon, and Isère. He escaped from Saint-Sulpicela-Pointe on 10 July 1943, and later participated in the Battle of Marseille. The Resistance Medal was awarded to Airoldi. His wife was expelled from the PCF in 1943, as she had an affair with a militant who was expelled from the PCF earlier.

== National Assembly ==
Airoldi was elected to the National Constituent Assembly in 1945 and 1946 from the department of Rhône. He was elected to the National Assembly in November 1946. During Airoldi's tenure in the National Assembly he served on the National Education Commission.

== Later life ==
Airoldi was not reelected to the central committee of the PCF in 1950, and left the federal secretariat of the PCF Rhône in 1951. He was elected to the Departmental Council of Rhône in 1951.

On 3 December 1974, Airoldi died in Saint-Genis-Laval.

== Works cited ==
- "Airoldi, Julien". Le Maitron. Archived from the original on 17 June 2025.
- "Julien, Jérôme Airoldi". National Assembly. Archived from the original on 17 June 2025.
