= Bjarne Schrøen =

Norwegian bobsledder (1918–1991)

Bjarne Schrøen (May 24, 1918, in Trondheim – July 5, 1991, in Trondheim), was a Norwegian bobsledder who competed in the late 1940s. At the 1948 Winter Olympics in St. Moritz, he finished tenth in the four-man event and 12th in the two-man event respectively.
