= Louis Rupprecht =

American speed skater

Personal information
- Nationality: American
- Born: December 27, 1925 St. Louis, Missouri, United States
- Died: April 5, 2000 (aged 74) St. Louis, Missouri, United States

Sport
- Sport: Speed skating

Louis Rupprecht (December 27, 1925 – April 5, 2000) was an American speed skater. He competed in two events at the 1948 Winter Olympics.
