= Catherine Jeandel =

French geochemist

- Born: 1957
- Education: Université Paris Diderot - Paris
- Scientific career
- Thesis: Comportement géochimique des isotopes du plutonium dans les milieux naturels (lacustre, fluvial, estuarien) (1981)

Catherine Jeandel is a French geochemical oceanographer known for her research on isotope geochemistry and trace elements in the ocean.

== Education and career ==
Jeandel grew up in northern Brittany wanting to be an ocean scientist, despite a lack of interest in mathematics. She was a student at the École normale supérieure de Sèvres from 1977 to 1982. Jeandel earned a B.S. and her Ph.D. at the University of Paris VII.

From 1982 until 1983, she was a research associate at the Institut de Physique du Globe de Paris. She joined the Centre national de la recherche scientifique (CNRS) in 1983. From 1988 until 1990, Jeandel was at the Lamont-Doherty Geological Observatory. She was promoted to research director at the CNRS in 2007.

In 2018, Jeandel was elected a fellow of the American Geophysical Union who cited her "for fundamental research on the marine biogeochemical cycles of trace elements and for exploiting them as tracers in chemical and paleoceanography".

== Research ==
Jeandel is known for her research on trace elements found in seawater and on marine particles, include investigations into vanadium, chromium, and neodymium. She has examined trace elements at multiple locations in the global ocean, include time-series sites such as KERFIX, in the Southern Ocean, and the EUMELI sites in the Atlantic Ocean. A portion of her research examines the role of particles from land that transport trace elements into marine systems Jeandel served on the Scientific Steering Committee of the GEOTRACES project, where she focused on the transport of trace elements into the global ocean.

=== Selected publications ===
- Jeandel, Catherine; Mosseri, Remy (2011). Le climat à découvert (in French). Paris: CNRS. p. 288. ISBN 978-2271071989.
- Roy-Barman, Matthieu; Jeandel, Catherine (2016). Marine geochemistry : ocean circulation, carbon cycle and climate change (First ed.). Oxford: Oxford University Press. p. 384. ISBN 9780198787495.
- Jeandel, C. (June 1993). "Concentration and isotopic composition of Nd in the South Atlantic Ocean". Earth and Planetary Science Letters. 117 (3–4): 581–591. Bibcode:1993E&PSL.117..581J. doi:10.1016/0012-821X(93)90104-H.
- Lacan, Francois; Jeandel, Catherine (April 2005). "Neodymium isotopes as a new tool for quantifying exchange fluxes at the continent–ocean interface". Earth and Planetary Science Letters. 232 (3–4): 245–257. Bibcode:2005E&PSL.232..245L. doi:10.1016/j.epsl.2005.01.004.
- Blain, Stéphane; Quéguiner, Bernard; Armand, Leanne; Belviso, Sauveur; Bombled, Bruno; Bopp, Laurent; Bowie, Andrew; Brunet, Christian; Brussaard, Corina; Carlotti, François; Christaki, Urania; Corbière, Antoine; Durand, Isabelle; Ebersbach, Frederike; Fuda, Jean-Luc; Garcia, Nicole; Gerringa, Loes; Griffiths, Brian; Guigue, Catherine; Guillerm, Christophe; Jacquet, Stéphanie; Jeandel, Catherine; Laan, Patrick; Lefèvre, Dominique; Lo Monaco, Claire; Malits, Andrea; Mosseri, Julie; Obernosterer, Ingrid; Park, Young-Hyang; Picheral, Marc; Pondaven, Philippe; Remenyi, Thomas; Sandroni, Valérie; Sarthou, Géraldine; Savoye, Nicolas; Scouarnec, Lionel; Souhaut, Marc; Thuiller, Doris; Timmermans, Klaas; Trull, Thomas; Uitz, Julia; van Beek, Pieter; Veldhuis, Marcel; Vincent, Dorothée; Viollier, Eric; Vong, Lilita; Wagener, Thibaut (April 2007). "Effect of natural iron fertilization on carbon sequestration in the Southern Ocean" (PDF). Nature. 446 (7139): 1070–1074. Bibcode:2007Natur.446.1070B. doi:10.1038/nature05700. PMID 17460670. S2CID 4423573.

== Awards and honors ==
- Fellow, American Geophysical Union (2018)
- CNRS bronze medal (1992)
- Knight of the French Legion of Honor (2008)
- Officer of the French National Order of Merit (Ordre national du Mérite) (2015)
- Georges Milot Prize and Medal from the French Academy of Sciences (2018)
- Fellow, Geochemical Society and the European Association of Geochemistry (2018)
