= Francis Tyler =

American bobsledder

Personal information
- Full name: Francis William Tyler
- Nationality: American
- Born: 11 December 1904 Lake Placid, New York, US
- Died: 11 April 1956 (aged 51) Lake Placid, New York

Sport
- Sport: Bobsleigh
Medal record
Men's Bobsleigh
Representing the United States
Olympic Games
Gold medal – first place	1948 St. Moritz	Four-man

Francis William Tyler (December 11, 1904 – April 11, 1956) was an American bobsledder who competed in the late 1940s. Competing in two Winter Olympics, he won the gold medal in the four-man event at St. Moritz in 1948.

After the end of each bobsled run, Tyler was known for lighting up a cigarette to smoke, and was even depicted in an advertisement for Camel cigarettes in 1949.

He died of a heart attack in 1956.
