= Paula Kann =

Austrian-born American alpine skier

Paula Kann (known as Paula Kann Valar after her marriage) (February 1, 1922; Vienna, Austria – November 2, 2001; Franconia, New Hampshire, United States) was an Austrian born American alpine skier who represented the United States at the 1948 Winter Olympics in St. Moritz, Switzerland.

Paula Kann was born in Vienna in 1922 and started skiing with the help of her father, Dr. Leo Kann, when she was only six years old. She moved from Austria to New York City in 1940 but soon moved to North Conway, New Hampshire with her father. There she skied with Hannes Schneider, a great ski teacher and developer of the Arlberg technique. She started skiing competitively in 1941-42, and won the Eastern Slope Ski Club Giant Slalom that year, then in 1943 she set the girl's record for the Downhill Run at Lake Placid, with a time of only 1:37:2. In March 1945 she won the Slalom Race in Sainte-Marguerite-du-Lac-Masson, Quebec on Mt. Baldy. She won the American downhill championship in 1946 and joined the United States Ski Team in 1947. In 1948 she took part in the Winter Olympics and placed 28th in the Women's downhill and 11th in the Women's slalom.

After her retirement from competition, she married fellow skier Paul Valar in 1950 and became a ski instructor in New Hampshire. The couple was inducted into the National Ski Hall of Fame in 1970.
