= Freddy Mansveld =

Belgian bobsledder

Medal record

Bobsleigh

Olympic Games
Silver medal – second place	1948 St. Moritz	Four-man

Alfred 'Freddy' Mansveld (2 August 1911 – 4 January 1986) was a Belgian bobsledder who competed in the late 1940s. He won a silver medal in the four-man event at the 1948 Winter Olympics in St. Moritz.
