= Henri Evrot =

French bobsledder

Medal record

Bobsleigh

World Championships
Bronze medal – third place	1947 St. Moritz	Four-man

Henri Evrot (born 6 June 1901; date of death unknown) was a French bobsledder who competed in the late 1940s. He won a bronze medal in the four-man event at the 1947 FIBT World Championships in St. Moritz.

Evrot also finished 11th in the two-man event as well as 13th in the four-man event at the 1948 Winter Olympics in St. Moritz.
