= Alf Large =

Norwegian bobsledder

Alf Large (March 4, 1918 – January 28, 2007) was a Norwegian bobsledder who competed in the late 1940s. He finished fifth in the four-man event at the 1948 Winter Olympics, in St. Moritz.
