= Amédée Ronzel =

French bobsledder

Personal information
- Full name: Louis Amédée Ronzel
- Nationality: French
- Born: 8 January 1909 Divonne-les-Bains, France
- Died: 13 April 1973 (aged 64) Chamonix-Mont-Blanc, France

Sport
- Sport: Bobsleigh

Amédée Ronzel (8 January 1909 – 13 April 1973) was a French bobsledder. Competing in two Winter Olympics, he earned his best finish of ninth in the four-man event at St. Moritz in 1948. In 1936 he failed to finish in the four-man event.
