= Dennis Blundell =

British speed skater

Personal information
- Full name: Dennis Frederick Blundell
- Nationality: British
- Born: 17 June 1921; Birmingham, England
- Died: December 2003; Dudley, England

Sport
- Sport: Speed skating

Dennis Frederick Blundell (17 June 1921 – December 2003) was a British speed skater. He competed in three events at the 1948 Winter Olympics.
