= Bernhard Schilter =

Swiss bobsledder

Bernhard Schilter (born 23 January 1922) was a Swiss bobsledder who competed in the late 1940s. He finished eighth in the four-man event at the 1948 Winter Olympics in St. Moritz.
