= Gordon Wren =

American ski jumper

Gordon L. Wren (January 5, 1919 – November 25, 1999) was an American ski jumper who competed in the 1940s. He finished fifth in the individual large hill event at the 1948 Winter Olympics in St. Moritz.

Wren was born in Steamboat Springs, Colorado. He was inducted into the Colorado Sports Hall of Fame in 1972. Wren died in Steamboat Springs of cancer at age 80.
