= Georgette Miller-Thiollière =

French alpine skier (1920–2010)

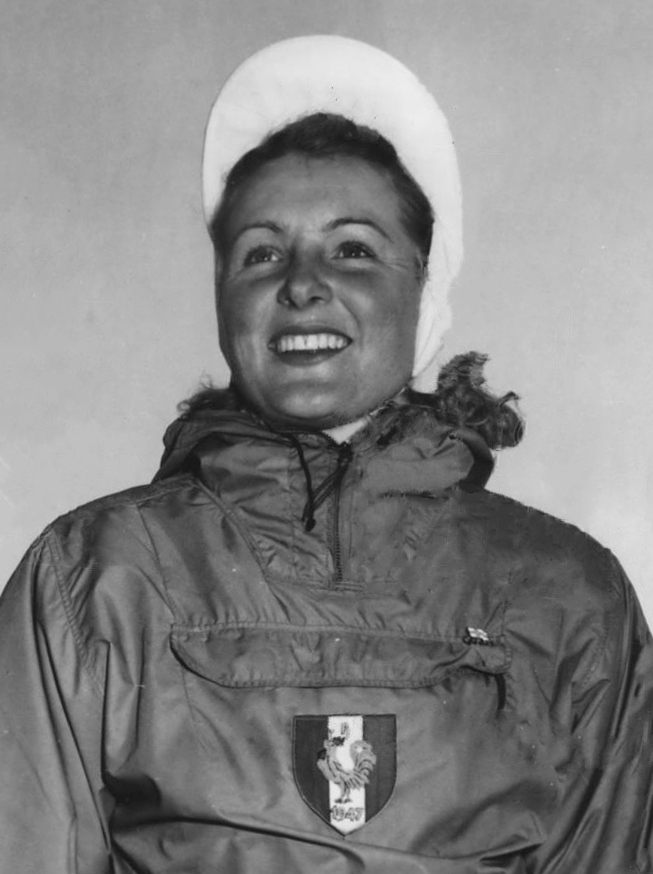
- Miller-Thiollière at the 1948 Olympics

Personal information
- Born: 7 May 1920 Chamonix, France
- Died: 23 January 2010 (aged 89) Los Angeles, California, United States

Sport
- Sport: Alpine skiing

Georgette Miller-Thiollière (7 May 1920 – 23 January 2010) was a French alpine skier. Together with her younger sister Suzanne Thiollière she competed at the 1948 Winter Olympics with and placed fourth in the slalom.
