= Ray Blum =

American speed skater

Raymond Edward Blum (April 11, 1919 – May 5, 2010) was an American speed skater who competed at the 1948 Winter Olympics in St. Moritz. He placed 20th in the Men's 1500 metres competition in a field of 45 and 17th in the Men's 5000 metres event in a field of 40. He was born in Nutley, New Jersey, and was a member of the Paterson Skating Club. He attended the Newark College of Engineering at the New Jersey Institute of Technology and earned a Bachelor's degree from the institution in 1950, after a stint in the United States Navy during World War II. He spent his later life working as an aerospace engineer for several companies in New England and California. On October 26, 1996, he was inducted into the NJIT Highlanders' Hall of Fame for his success as both a cyclist and a speed skater, as well as the American National Speedskating Museum and Hall of Fame on May 17, 1969. He died on May 5, 2010, in New Jersey.
