= Felix Endrich =

Swiss bobsledder (1921–1953)

Medal record

Bobsleigh

Olympic Games
Gold medal – first place	1948 St. Moritz	Two-man

World Championships
Gold medal – first place	1949 Lake Placid	Two-man
Gold medal – first place	1953 Garmisch-Partenkirchen	Two-man
Silver medal – second place	1947 St. Moritz	Two-man
Bronze medal – third place	1951 Alpe d'Huez	Two-man

Felix Endrich (5 December 1921 – 31 January 1953) was a Swiss bobsledder who competed in the late 1940s and early 1950s. Competing in two Winter Olympics, he won the gold medal along with brakeman Fritz Waller in the two-man event at the 1948 Winter Olympics in St. Moritz.

== Career ==
As a pilot, Endrich won four medals in the two-man event at the FIBT World Championships with two golds (1949, 1953), one silver (1947), and one bronze (1951).

Endrich was killed at the 1953 FIBT World Championships in Garmisch-Partenkirchen, West Germany during the four-man competition when the sled he was driving hurtled over a wall and crashed into a tree. He suffered a broken neck in the collision and was pronounced dead on arrival at the hospital in Garmisch-Partenkirchen. He had also won the two-man world championship a week earlier.
