= René Charlet =

French bobsledder

Personal information
- Full name: René Édouard Charlet
- Nationality: French
- Born: 26 April 1903 Chamonix-Mont-Blanc, France
- Died: 18 July 1971 (aged 68) Chamonix-Mont-Blanc, France

Sport
- Sport: Bobsleigh

René Charlet (April 26, 1903 – July 18, 1971) was a French bobsledder who competed from the mid-1930s to the late 1940s. Competing in two Winter Olympics, he earned his best finish of 9th in the four-man event at St. Moritz in 1948. In 1936 he failed to finish in the four-man event.
