= Achille Fould (bobsleigh) =

French bobsledder

Personal information
- Full name: Henri Jacques Achille Fould
- Nationality: French
- Born: 8 April 1919 Paris, France
- Died: 20 January 1950 (aged 30) Chamonix-Mont-Blanc, France

Sport
- Sport: Bobsled
Medal record
Bobsleigh
Representing France
World Championships
Bronze medal – third place	1947 St. Moritz	Four-man

Henri Achille Fould (8 April 1919 – 20 January 1950) was a French bobsledder who competed in the late 1940s. He won a bronze medal in the four-man event at the 1947 FIBT World Championships in St. Moritz.

Fould also finished 11th in the two-man event at the 1948 Winter Olympics in St. Moritz.
