= James Bickford (bobsleigh) =

American bobsledder (1912–1989)

Personal information
- Full name: James John Bickford Jr.
- Nationality: American
- Born: 2 November 1912 Lake Placid, New York, USA
- Died: 3 October 1989 (aged 76) Rainbow Lake, New York, USA

Sport
- Sport: Bobsleigh
Medal record
Bobsleigh
Representing United States
Olympic Games
Bronze medal – third place	1948 St. Moritz	Four-man
World Championships
Silver medal – second place	1949 Lake Placid	Four-man
Bronze medal – third place	1937 St. Moritz	Four-man
Bronze medal – third place	1954 Cortina d'Ampezzo	Two-man

James John Bickford (November 2, 1912 – October 3, 1989) was an American bobsledder who competed from the late 1930s to the mid-1950s. Competing in four Winter Olympics, he won a bronze medal in the four-man event at St. Moritz in 1948.

Bickford also carried the United States flag during the opening ceremonies of the 1952 and 1956 Winter Olympics.

At the FIBT World Championships, he won three medals with one silver (Four-man: 1949) and two bronzes (Two-man: 1954, Four-man: 1937).

Olympic Games
Preceded by Ralph Craig	Flagbearer for United States; Oslo 1952	Succeeded by Norman Armitage
Olympic Games
Preceded by Norman Armitage	Flagbearer for United States; Cortina d'Ampezzo 1956	Succeeded by Norman Armitage
