= FIBT World Championships 1949 =

Winter sport competition

1949 World Championships
- Location: Lake Placid, New York

The FIBT World Championships 1949 took place in Lake Placid, New York, United States. It marked the first time the championships took place outside Europe.

== Two man bobsleigh ==
Pos	Team	Time
Gold	Switzerland (Felix Endrich, Fritz Waller)	
Silver	Switzerland (Fritz Feierabend, Heinrich Angst)	
Bronze	United States (Frederick Fortune, John McDonald)	

== Four man bobsleigh ==
Pos	Team	Time
Gold	United States (Stanley Benham, Patrick Martin, William Casey, William D'Amico)	
Silver	United States (James Bickford, Henry Sterns, Pat Buckley, Donald Dupree)	
Bronze	Switzerland (Fritz Feierabend, Werner Spring, Friedrich Waller, Heinrich Angst)	

The US team led by Benham become the first non-Europeans to win a championship event.

== Medal table ==
Rank	Nation	Gold	Silver	Bronze	Total
1	Switzerland (SUI)	1	1	1	3
1	United States (USA)	1	1	1	3
Totals (2 entries)		2	2	2	6
