= Edilberto Campadese =

Italian bobsledder (1915–2003)

Edilberto Campadese (28 March 1915 – 2 January 2003) was an Italian bobsledder who competed in the late 1940s. At the 1948 Winter Olympics in St. Moritz, he finished sixth in the four-man and eighth in the two-man event respectively.

== Sources ==
- 1948 bobsleigh two-man results
- 1948 bobsleigh four-man results
- Bobsleigh two-man results: 1932-56 and since 1964 (in Italian)
- Wallechinsky, David (1984). The Complete Book of the Olympics: 1896 - 1980. New York: Penguin Books. pp. 558, 560, 577.
- Edilberto Campadese's profile at Sports Reference.com
