= William McLean (bobsleigh) =

British bobsledder

William John McLean (9 July 1918, Katanning, Western Australia – 9 November 1963, Halton Camp, Wendover, Buckinghamshire) was a British bobsledder who competed in the late 1940s. He finished seventh in the four-man event at the 1948 Winter Olympics in St. Moritz.
