= Enrico Airoldi =

Italian bobsledder (1923–1994)

Enrico Airoldi (8 September 1923 – 9 July 1994) was an Italian bobsledder who competed in the late 1940s. He finished 11th in the four-man event at the 1948 Winter Olympics in St. Moritz.

Airoldi was born in Cesano Maderno in 1923 and died in Castellanza in 1994. He was the brother of fellow Olympian Remo Airoldi.
