= William Hirigoyen =

France international rugby union player & bobsledder

Medal record

Bobsleigh

World Championships
Bronze medal – third place	1947 St. Moritz	Four-man

William Gayraud-Hirigoyen (1 May 1898 – 9 December 1962) was a French athlete who competed in rugby union in the late 1910s and early 1920s, then moved to bobsleigh and skeleton in the late 1940s.

In rugby, Hirigoyen played in the Five Nations Championship (Six Nations Championship since 2000) in 1919–20, scoring one try in the event. He played in the Hooker position during his career. Hirigoyen would later serve as a sports official in rugby during the 1920s.

Hirigoyen later competed in bobsleigh and skeleton from the mid-1920s to the late 1940s. He won a bronze medal in the four-man bobsleigh event at the 1947 FIBT World Championships in St. Moritz. The following year, he finished last among thirteen competitors in the men's skeleton event at the 1948 Winter Olympics in St. Moritz. At those same games, Hirigoyen also finished 12th in the two-man event.
