= Remo Airoldi =

Italian bobsledder (born 1921)

Remo Airoldi (born 4 February 1921) was an Italian bobsledder who competed in the late 1940s. He finished 11th in the four-man event at the 1948 Winter Olympics in St. Moritz.

Airoldi was born in İzmir, Turkey. He was the brother of fellow Olympian Enrico Airoldi.
