= Nino Bibbia =

Italian skeleton racer and bobsledder

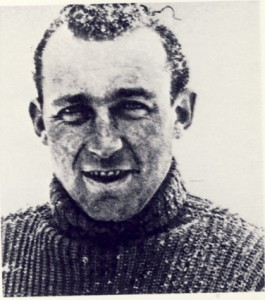
- Bibbia in 1940's

Medal record

Skeleton

Representing Italy

Olympic Games
Gold medal – first place	1948 St. Moritz	Men

Nino Bibbia (15 March 1922 – 28 May 2013) was an Italian skeleton racer and bobsledder who competed in the late 1940s. Born in Bianzone, Lombardy, he won the gold medal in the men's skeleton event at the 1948 Winter Olympics in St. Moritz.

He was Italy's first Winter Olympic medalist in any sport, its first gold medalist in the Winter Games, and its first in bobsleigh, luge, and skeleton.

== Biography ==
Bibbia also competed in bobsleigh at those same games, finishing sixth in the four-man and eighth in the two-man event respectively. Bibbia was also involved in other winter sports, including ski jumping, cross-country skiing, and alpine skiing. All told, he earned 231 golds, 97 silvers, and 84 bronzes in his illustrious career.

Turn 10 at Cesana Pariol, where the bobsleigh, luge, and skeleton competitions at the 2006 Winter Olympics took place, is named in Bibbia's honor.

Bibbia spent the last years of his life in Engadin, where he died at the age of 91 on 28 May 2013.

== Notes ==
- Men's skeleton Olympic medalists since 1928
- Wallechinsky, David (1984). The Complete Book of the Olympics: 1896 - 1980. New York: Penguin Books. pp. 558, 560, 577.
