= Frederick Fortune =

American bobsledder

Medal record

Men's Bobsleigh

Olympic Games
Bronze medal – third place	1948 St. Moritz	Two-man

World Championships
Bronze medal – third place	1949 Lake Placid	Two-man
Bronze medal – third place	1950 Cortina d'Ampezzo	Two-man
Bronze medal – third place	1965 St. Moritz	Four-man

Frederick Joseph Fortune, Jr. (April 1, 1921 – April 20, 1994) was an American bobsledder who competed from the late 1940s to the mid-1960s. Competing in two Winter Olympics, he won the bronze medal in the two-man event at St. Moritz in 1948. Four years later he finished seventh in the two-man event at the 1952 Winter Olympics.

Fortune also won three bronze medals at the FIBT World Championships with two medals in two-man (1949, 1950) and one medal in four-man (1965).

In addition to bobsledding, Fred Fortune was a fine skier and he served during World War II in the 10th Mountain Division Ski Troops, during which time he earned a Bronze Star After the war, he returned to Lake Placid where he won the 1947 North American 2-man title with his Olympic partner, Sky Carron. Fortune’s occupation was as a contractor. He founded and built two towns – North Pole, New York and North Pole, Colorado (on Pikes Peak) – both Santa Claus Children's Villages.
