= William Dupree (bobsleigh) =

American bobsledder (1909–1955)

Medal record

Bobsleigh

Representing the United States

Olympic Games
Bronze medal – third place	1948 St. Moritz	Four-man

World Championships
Bronze medal – third place	1937 St. Moritz	Four-man

William Francis Dupree (June 7, 1909 – February 25, 1955), from Saranac Lake, New York, was an American bobsledder who competed from the late 1930s to the late 1940s. He won a bronze medal in the four-man event at the 1948 Winter Olympics in St. Moritz.

Dupree also won a bronze medal in the four-man event at the 1937 FIBT World Championships in St. Moritz.
