= Schuyler Carron =

American bobsledder

Olympic medal record

Men's Bobsleigh
Bronze medal – third place	1948 St. Moritz	Two-man

Schuyler Antony Carron (August 24, 1921 – June 15, 1964) was an American bobsledder who competed in the late 1940s. He won the bronze medal in the two-man event at the 1948 Winter Olympics in St. Moritz.
