= Jean Morin (bobsleigh) =

French bobsledder

Personal information
- Full name: Jean François Antonin Morin
- Nationality: French
- Born: 28 May 1901; Dijon, France
- Died: 25 December 1975 (aged 74); Nuits-Saint-Georges, France

Sport
- Sport: bobsled

Jean Morin (May 28, 1901 – December 25, 1975) was a French bobsledder who competed in the late 1940s. He finished ninth in the four-man event at the 1948 Winter Olympics in St. Moritz.
