= Ed Rimkus =

American bobsledder (1913–1999)

Medal record

Bobsleigh

Representing the United States

Olympic Games
Gold medal – first place	1948 St. Moritz	Four-man

Edward William Rimkus (August 10, 1913 in Schenectady, New York – May 17, 1999 in Long Beach, California) was an American of Lithuanian descent bobsledder who competed in the late 1940s and early 1950s. He won a gold medal in the four-men event at the 1948 Winter Olympics in St. Moritz. He died in Long Beach, California.
