= William D'Amico =

American bobsledder (1910–1984)

Medal record

Men's bobsleigh

Representing the United States

Olympic Games
Gold medal – first place	1948 St. Moritz	Four-man

World Championships
Gold medal – first place	1949 Lake Placid	Four-man
Gold medal – first place	1950 Cortina d'Ampezzo	Four-man
Bronze medal – third place	1950 Cortina d'Ampezzo	Two-man

William John D'Amico (October 3, 1910 – October 30, 1984) was an American bobsledder who competed in the late 1940s and early 1950s. He won a gold medal in the four-man event at the 1948 Winter Olympics in St. Moritz.

D'Amico also won three medals at the FIBT World Championships with two golds (Four-man: 1949, 1950) and one bronze (Two-man: 1950).
