= Donald Dupree =

American bobsledder (1919–1993)

Medal record

Bobsleigh

Olympic Games
Bronze medal – third place	1948 St. Moritz	Four-man

World Championships
Silver medal – second place	1949 Lake Placid	Four-man

Donald Victor Dupree, Sr. (February 10, 1919 - May 1, 1993), from Saranac Lake, New York, was an American bobsledder who competed in the late 1940s. He won a bronze medal in the four-man event at the 1948 Winter Olympics in St. Moritz.

Dupree also won a silver medal in the four-man at the 1949 FIBT World Championships in Lake Placid, New York.
