= Walter Jeandel =

French cross-country and Nordic combined skier (1918–2012)

Personal information
- Nationality: French
- Born: 25 April 1918 Versoix, France
- Died: 4 April 2012 (aged 93) Bagnères-de-Bigorre, France

Sport
- Sport: Cross-country

Walter Jeandel (25 April 1918 – 4 April 2012) was a French cross-country and Nordic combined skier who competed in the 1948 Winter Olympics.
