= René Jeandel =

French skier (1924–2018)

Personal information
- Full name: René Rudolf Jeandel
- Nationality: French
- Born: 11 July 1924; Bern, Switzerland
- Died: 8 January 2018 (aged 93); Barcelonnette, France

Sport
- Sport: Cross-country

René Rudolf Jeandel (11 July 1924 – 8 January 2018) was a French cross-country and Nordic combined skier who competed in the 1948 Winter Olympics.
