= Louis-Georges Niels =

Belgian bobsledder

Medal record

Bobsleigh

Olympic Games
Silver medal – second place	1948 St. Moritz	Four-man

Louis-Georges Niels (2 May 1919 – 16 February 2000) was a Belgian bobsledder who competed in the late 1940s. He won a silver medal in the four-man event at the 1948 Winter Olympics in St. Moritz and finished tenth in the two-man event at those same games.
