= Thomas Hicks (bobsleigh) =

American bobsledder

Olympic medal record

Bobsleigh
Bronze medal – third place	1948 St. Moritz	Four-man

Thomas A. Hicks (June 1, 1918 – July 14, 1992) was an American bobsledder who competed in the late 1940s. He won a bronze medal in the four-man event at the 1948 Winter Olympics in St. Moritz.
