= Edgar Meddings =

British bobsledder (1923–2020)

Edgar James Meddings (5 June 1923 – 25 December 2020) was a British bobsledder who competed in the late 1940s. He finished 15th in the four-man event at the 1948 Winter Olympics in St. Moritz.

Ed Meddings was born in Dilhorne, Staffordshire, the son of a farmer, and educated at King Edward VI School Lichfield. He joined the RAF in 1939 initially as an apprentice armourer, qualifying as a pilot in 1943 on his 20th birthday.

The British bobsleigh team for the 1948 Olympics was built around RAF personnel. A suitable physique, he was asked in summer 1947 if he was interested in bobsleigh, but he didn't know what it was. He was however chosen as part of a 13-man squad to go to St Moritz and practice the sport, being selected in the British second quartet for the Olympics.

He married his wife Anne in 1956 and they had three children. He remained in the RAF until 1968, and settled in Hinton Charterhouse where for around 40 years he was an active groundsman and umpire for the local cricket club.
