= Jacques Descatoire =

French bobsledder

Personal information
- Full name: Jacques Gaston Léon Jean Descatoire
- Nationality: French
- Born: 28 May 1920 Paris, France
- Died: 11 May 1984 (aged 63) Lanzac, France

Sport
- Sport: bobsled

Jacques Gaston Leon Jean Descatoire (28 May 1920 – 11 May 1984) was a French bobsledder who competed in the late 1940s. He finished ninth in the four-man event at the 1948 Winter Olympics in St. Moritz.
