= Basil Wellicome =

British bobsledder

Basil William Wellicome (28 December 1926 – 28 January 2016) was a British bobsledder who competed in the late 1940s. At the 1948 Winter Olympics in St. Moritz, he competed in the two-man event, but fell during the third run and did not finish.
