= Raymond Collings =

British bobsledder

Raymond William Pennington Collings AFC (23 September 1908 – 13 November 1973) was a British bobsledder who competed in the late 1940s. At the 1948 Winter Olympics in St. Moritz, he finished fifth in the two-man and seventh in the four-man events.
