= Richard Jeffrey (bobsleigh) =

British bobsledder

Richard Robert Jeffrey (24 November 1917 – 9 October 1953) was a British bobsledder who competed in the late 1940s. At the 1948 Winter Olympics in St. Moritz, he finished 15th in the four-man event.
