= James Iremonger (bobsleigh) =

British bobsledder

James Henry Iremonger (31 March 1918 – 5 September 2002) was a British bobsledder who competed in the late 1940s. At the 1948 Winter Olympics in St. Moritz, he finished 15th in the four-man event.
