= Max Houben =

Belgian athlete (1898–1949)

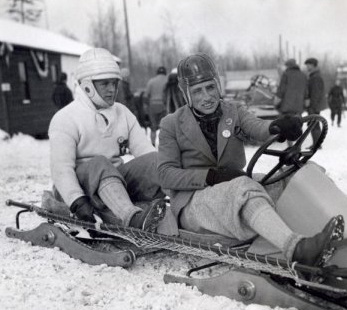
- Houben (right) training with Swiss Hans Eisenhut at the 1932 Olympics

Personal information
- Full name: Max Isidore Marie Jules Houben
- Born: Max Isidore Marie Jules; 5 May 1898 Verviers, Belgium
- Died: 10 February 1949 (aged 50) Lake Placid, New York, United States

Sport
- Sport: Bobsled, sprint running
- Event: 100 m
- Club: RCA Spa

Achievements and titles
- Personal best: 100 m – 10.8 (1920)
Medal record
Representing Belgium
Olympic Games
Silver medal – second place	1948 St. Moritz	Four-man
World Championships
Silver medal – second place	1947 St. Moritz	Four-man
Bronze medal – third place	1947 St. Moritz	Two-man

Max Isidore Marie Jules Houben (5 May 1898 – 10 February 1949) was a Belgian versatile athlete who competed from the early 1920s until his death at the 1949 FIBT World Championships. He won a silver medal in the four-man bobsled event at the 1948 Winter Olympics in St. Moritz, and was the oldest medalist at the Winter Olympics (48 years, 278 days) until Canadian Russ Howard won a gold medal in men's curling at the 2006 Winter Olympics in Turin (50 years, 7 days).

== Athletics career ==
Houben was the national champion in the 100 m. He also made it to the quarterfinals of the 200 m event and the semifinals of the 4 × 100 m relay at the 1920 Summer Olympics. Houben later switched to bobsleigh, in which he competed at the 1928–1948 Winter Olympics, becoming the first Belgian to take part in both Winter and Summer Olympics.

== Bobsleigh career ==
At the Winter Olympics, Houben earned his best finish prior to World War II of fifth in the four-man event at the 1936 Winter Olympics. After the war, he earned two medals at the 1947 FIBT World Championships in St. Moritz with a silver in the four-man and a bronze in the two-man event. He won his only Olympic medal in the four-man event the following year, also in St. Moritz.

== Other sports ==
Houben played association football for Royale Union Saint-Gilloise 1923–1925 and 1926–1929. He also competed in the 24 hours of Francorchamps endurance race in auto racing. He played for CS Verviétois in division one 1919–1923 and 1925–1926, division two in 1931–1936, for Racing CB in 1929–1931, Union SG 1923–1925 and 1926–1929, and played 190 games and scored 40 goals.

== Death ==
Houben died during a practice run at the 1949 FIBT World Championships in Lake Placid, New York, when his two-man sledge catapulted off of "shady" corner at the bobsleigh track. Houben was killed instantly, while his partner Jacques Mouvet survived with a broken skull and a serious back injury. The Belgian team withdrew as a result.

Following the accident the community of Lake Placid donated a trophy to the FIBT to be presented to the two-man bobsleigh world champions and named it in honour of Houben.
