= Friedrich Waller =

Swiss bobsledder (1920–2004)

Medal record

Bobsleigh
Gold medal – first place	1948 St. Moritz	Two-man

World Championships
Gold medal – first place	1949 Lake Placid	Two-man
Silver medal – second place	1947 St. Moritz	Two-man
Bronze medal – third place	1949 Lake Placid	Four-man

Friedrich "Fritz" Waller (March 18, 1920 – February 15, 2004) was a Swiss bobsledder who competed in the late 1940s. He won the gold medal in the two-man event at the 1948 Winter Olympics in St. Moritz.

Waller also won three medals at the FIBT World Championships with one gold (Two-man: 1949), one silver (Two-man: 1947) and one bronze (Four-man: 1949).
