= Tuffield A. Latour =

American bobsledder

Tuffield A. Latour (November 18, 1909 – July 3, 1965) was an American Olympic bobsledder whose career spanned from 1936–1959. He finished ninth in the two-man event at the 1948 Winter Olympics in St. Moritz.

Latour was 2-man National Champion in 1940, 1941, 1946, 1947 and 1959. In 1958 together with Forrest Morgan he won the 2-man North American Championships. He also held that title in 1940, 1942 and 1946.

Latour's grandson, also named Tuffield, later became a bobsledder for the US in the 1990s. He later went on to coach the American women to gold in the two-woman event at the 2002 Winter Olympics in Salt Lake City. He coached the 2006 U.S. Men's Olympic Bobsled team. From 2007-2010 he coached the Canadian Men and Women's Bobsled teams who took Gold, Silver and Bronze at the 2010 Winter Olympics. In 2010 he took over the U.S. Skeleton program. In 2012 he coached Katie Uhlaender to a World Championship in Lake Placid. At the 2013 World Championships in St. Moritz he coached Noelle Pikus-Pace to a Silver Medal. At the 2014 Winter Olympics in Sochi, Russia, he led Pikus-Pace to a Silver medal and Matthew Antoine to a Bronze medal.
