= Skeleton (sport) =

Winter sliding sport

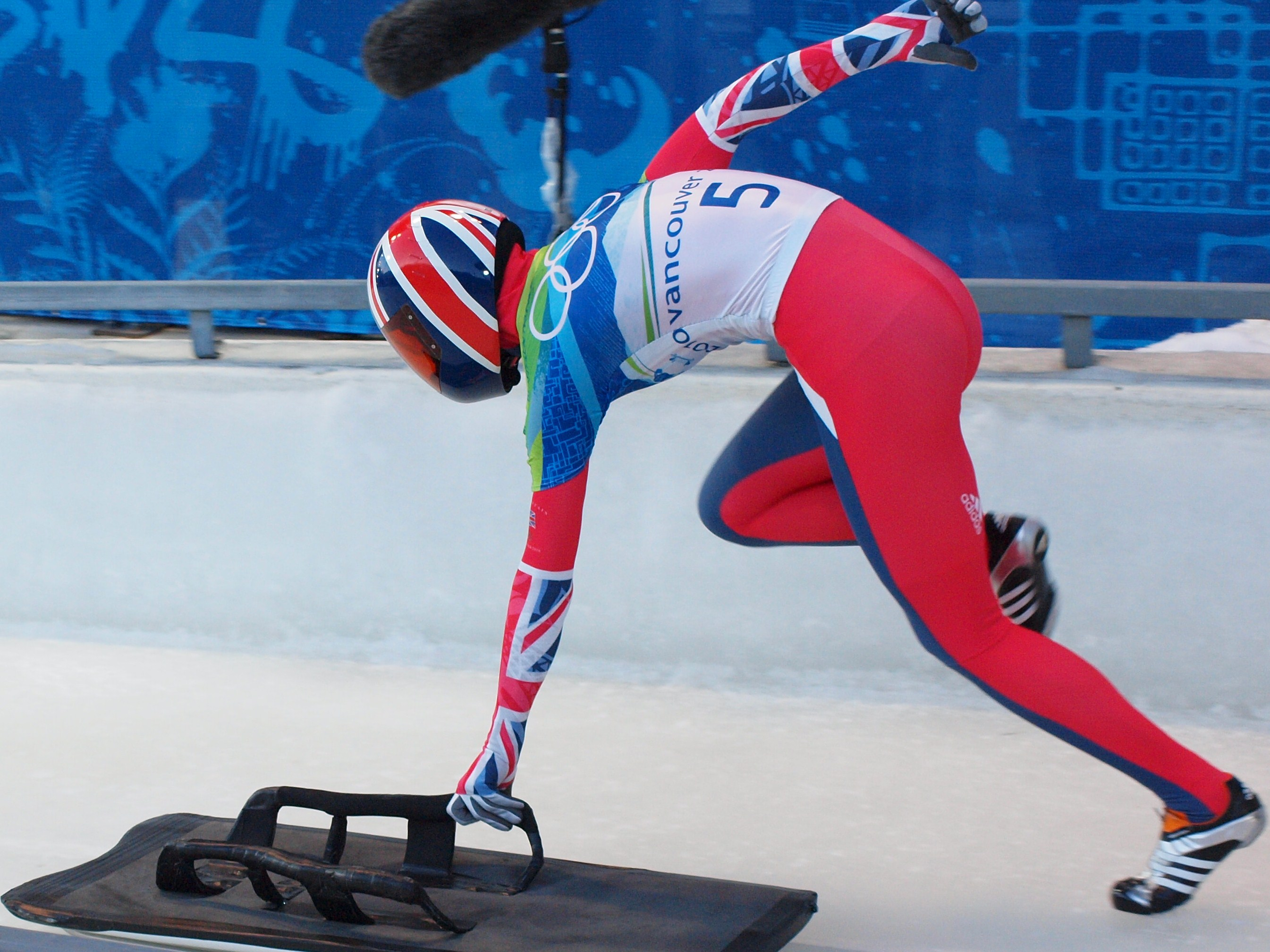
- Amy Williams pushes off at the start, 2010
- Highest governing body: International Bobsleigh and Skeleton Federation
- First played: Late 19th century, Switzerland

Characteristics
- Contact: No
- Team members: 1
- Type: Winter sport, time trial
- Venue: Skeleton tracks

Presence
- Olympic: 1928, 1948, 2002 to present

Skeleton is a winter sliding sport in which a person rides a small sled, known as a skeleton bobsled (or bobsleigh), down a frozen track while lying face down and head-first. The sport and the sled may have been named for the sled's resemblance to a ribcage.

Unlike other sliding sports bobsleigh and luge, the race always involves single riders. Like bobsleigh, but unlike luge, the race begins with a running start from the opening gate at the top of the course. The skeleton sled is thinner and heavier than the luge sled, and skeleton gives the rider more precise control of the sled. Skeleton is the slowest of the three sliding sports, as skeleton's face-down, head-first riding position is less aerodynamic than luge's face-up, feet-first ride.

Previously, skeleton appeared in the Olympic program in St. Moritz, Switzerland, in 1928 and again in 1948. It was added permanently to the Olympic program for the 2002 Winter Olympics, at which stage a women's race was added.

During elite racing the rider experiences accelerations up to 5 g and reaches speeds over 130 km/h (81 mph).

== History ==
The skeleton originated in St. Moritz, Switzerland, as a spinoff of the tobogganing sport pioneered by the British on the Cresta Run. Although skeleton "sliders" use equipment similar to that of Cresta "riders", the two sports are different: while skeleton is run on the same tracks used by bobsleds and luge (which are sufficiently 'closed' that a participant is highly unlikely to be ejected from the track), the Cresta takes place only on the Cresta Run (which is more open, meaning a rider losing control can fall out of the run). Skeleton sleds are steered using torque provided by the head and shoulders. The Cresta toboggan does not have a steering or braking mechanism, though Cresta riders use rakes on their boots in addition to shifting body weight to help steer and brake.

The sport of skeleton can be traced to 1882, when English soldiers constructed a toboggan track between the towns of Davos and Klosters in Switzerland. While toboggan tracks were not uncommon at the time, the added challenge of curves and bends in the Swiss track distinguished it from those of Canada and the United States. The source of the word is debated; some speculate that it comes from the skeleton-like appearance of the original sleds, and others an incorrectly anglicized version of the Norwegian word for toboggan, kjelke.

Approximately 30 km (20 mi) away in the winter sports town of St. Moritz, British men had long enjoyed racing one another down the busy, winding streets of the town, causing an uproar among citizens because of the danger to pedestrians and visiting tourists. In 1884, Major William Bulpett, with the backing of winter sports pioneer and Kulm hotel owner Caspar Badrutt, constructed the Cresta Run, the first tobogganing track of its kind in St. Moritz. The track ran three-quarters of a mile from St. Moritz to Celerina, with ten turns still used today. When the Winter Olympic Games were held at St. Moritz in 1928 and 1948, the Cresta Run was included in the program, the only two times skeleton was included as an Olympic event before its permanent addition in 2002 to the Winter Games.

In the 1887 Grand National competition in St. Moritz, a Mr. Cornish introduced the now-traditional head-first position, a trend that was in full force by the 1890 Grand National.

=== International expansion ===
Skeleton was practiced mainly in Switzerland; however, in 1905, Styria held its first skeleton competition in Mürzzuschlag, Austria. This opened the door to other national skeleton competitions including the Austrian championship held the following year. In 1908 and 1910, skeleton competitions were held in the Semmering Pass. As the popularity of the sport grew, skeleton evolved into the sport recognized today. In 1892, the sled was transformed by L. P. Child, an Englishman, to incorporate a more bare-bones design.

In 1923, the Federation Internationale de Bobsleigh et de Tobogganing (FIBT) was established as the governing body of the sport. Soon afterward, in 1926, the International Olympic Committee declared bobsleigh and skeleton as Olympic sports and adopted the rules of the St. Moritz run as the officially recognized Olympic rules. It was not until 2002, however, that skeleton returned to the Olympic Winter Games after a 54-year absence, with the 2002 Winter Olympics in Salt Lake City, Utah, US. In 2015, the FIBT was renamed the International Bobsleigh & Skeleton Federation (IBSF), and the Congress of the IBSF adopted its current governing statutes in 2016.

Popularity in the sport has grown since the 2002 Winter Olympics and now includes participation by some countries that either do not or cannot have a track because of climate, terrain or monetary limitations. Athletes from countries including Australia, New Zealand, Bermuda, South Africa, Argentina, Iraq, Israel, Mexico, Brazil, and even the Virgin Islands have become involved with the sport in recent years. The IBSF operates a support program for "emerging nations", which provides travel, coaching, and equipment funding assistance to countries which have neither a track nor three qualified pilots in three IBSF disciplines; in 2017, 20 national federations qualified for financial support in men's skeleton, and 11 qualified in women's skeleton.

== International competitions ==
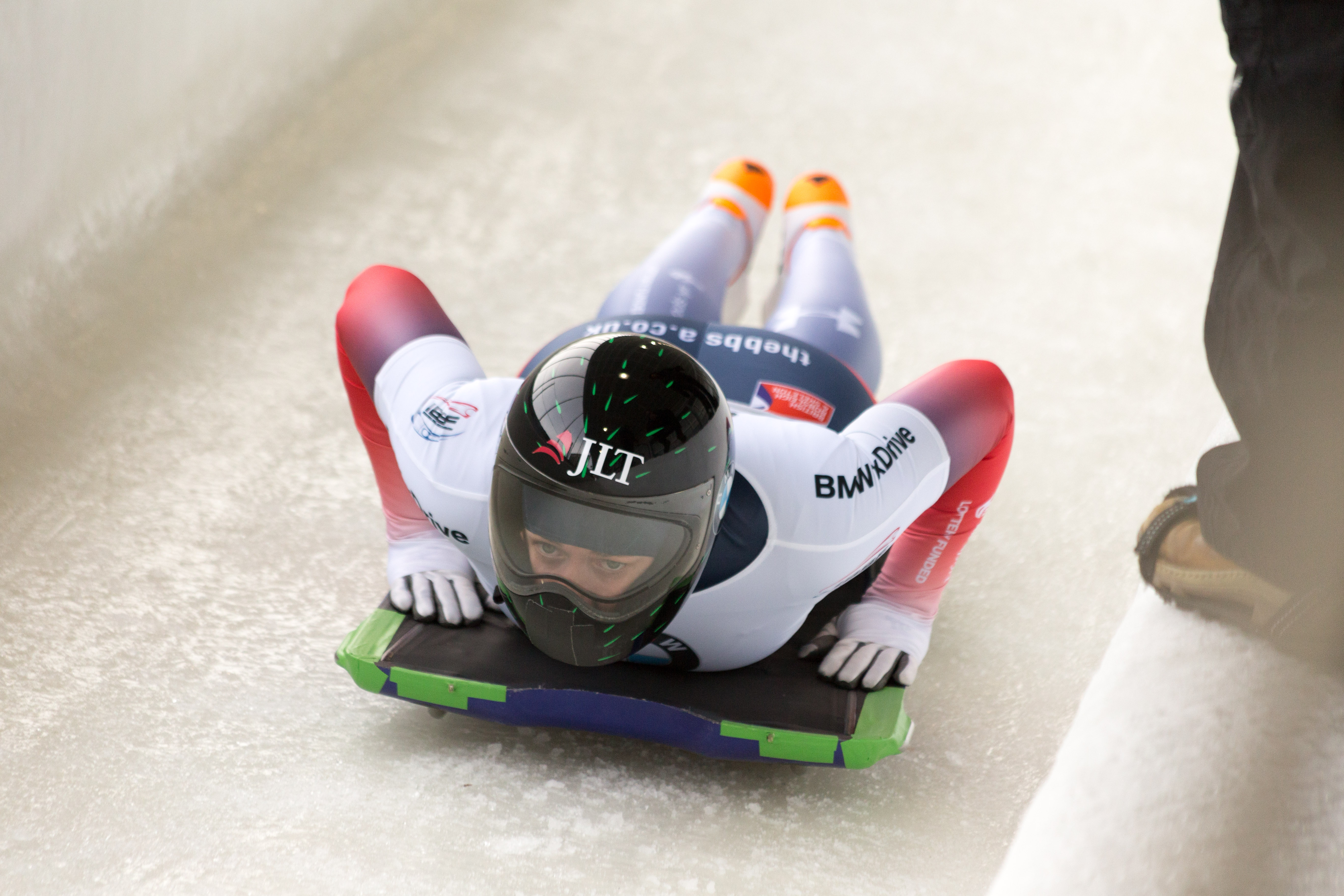
Lizzy Yarnold competing in the World Cup at Lake Placid in November 2017

The IBSF organizes three competitive circuits for international skeleton competition, in two tiers: two Continental Cups, and the top level World Cup. Each athlete receives points based on their results and the level of the competition, which are used to determine both their rankings on each circuit they race in and also an overall ranking across all circuits. An intermediate tier, the Intercontinental Cup, was discontinued after the 2022–23 season.

National federations are assigned athlete quota spots in the higher levels according to the overall rankings of their individual athletes during the previous season, but are free to send any qualified athlete to a competition in which they have available quota. However, individual athletes' discipline rankings are used to determine the start order for the first heat of each race: the track becomes less smooth after each successive run, so earlier starts are more desirable. In the second (fourth at the World Championships and Winter Olympics) heat, the competitors start in reverse order of their ranking after the previous heat. (At four-heat races, start order in heats two and three is in ascending order of combined time from the prior heats.)

In addition to the four race series, the IBSF also organizes World Championships, which are held at the end of every sliding season except when the Olympic Winter Games are held, and a Junior World Championships (open to athletes aged 23 and under) which are held annually without regard to the Olympics. One race each World Cup season is also designated the European Championship. The IBSF cooperates with the International Olympic Committee to supervise the skeleton races at the Olympic Winter Games, and the IBSF ranking system is used to determine the National Olympic Committees' athlete quota allocations.

On all of the regular competitive circuits, the race days are preceded by three or four days of pre-race training to allow athletes to learn the intricacies of each track, and each athlete must complete a certain number of successful training runs to be eligible to compete. Normally, if the same competition also includes bobsleigh races, the skeleton races will be held first, as the heavier bobsleighs do more damage to the track.

=== Continental Cups ===
The two Continental Cup series are the Europe Cup (also called "Europa Cup" and "European Cup") and the North American Cup. Both series are open to athletes from all participating nations, but with some restrictions: the top 15 athletes in combined ranking are not permitted to race in the Continental Cups, and athletes are not permitted to race unless their team has filled all of its assigned quota sports in the World Cup. In addition, teams are limited to four athletes on their home continent and two athletes on the other continent. (For the purposes of this restriction, African teams are considered to be home on the Europe Cup and Asian, Oceanian, and South American teams are home on the North American Cup.)

As the bottom level of international skeleton competition, race results in the Continental Cups are assigned the lowest point values for ranking, with a first-place finish being with 75 points (compared to 225 points for the World Cup). Only the top 30 athletes receive ranking points; 30th place is worth 1 point. However, two races are generally held in each discipline on a single race weekend, allowing consistently competitive athletes to earn a higher ranking than if they went to a single World Cup race and finished poorly.

=== Intercontinental Cup ===
The Intercontinental Cup (ICC) was introduced as an intermediate level between the Continental Cups and the World Cup; a first-place finish was worth 120 points in the IBSF ranking (vs. 225 points for a World Cup win). The ICC was discontinued after the 2022–23 season to increase the number of athletes participating on the World Cup.

=== World Cup ===
The World Cup is the top level of international skeleton competition, and has the most stringent team quotas, with no teams receiving an automatic entry. To qualify, a team must have placed at least one athlete in the top 70 (for men) of the overall ranking table (top 55 for women); quotas were loosened for the 2023–24 season to account for the discontinuation of the Intercontinental Cup. Each team receives a number of starting positions equal to the number of athletes from that team who were in the top 70 (for men) or top 55 (for women) in the previous season's overall rankings, to a maximum of four. To be eligible to enter a World Cup race, athletes must have safely completed five races on two tracks in the previous two seasons. At the end of the World Cup season, the man and woman with the highest ranking, considering only points earned in World Cup races, are given a trophy known as the "Crystal Globe".

=== Continental Championships ===
One World Cup race a year may be designated as a continental championship for the continent on which it is held. This championship is a "paper" race, based only on the times in the regularly scheduled World Cup event, with the athletes representing a different continent excluded. Currently, this is done only in Europe; the 2017/18 European Championship races were the World Cup races held on 15 December 2017 at Innsbruck, Austria. The current European champions are Martins Dukurs of Latvia and Elena Nikitina of Russia.

=== Senior World Championships ===
In non-Olympic years, a national federation volunteers to organize the (Senior) World Championships (for both bobsleigh and skeleton), which are open to all athletes meeting the experience requirements that apply to the World Cup and the ICC (including junior athletes). The quota system for the Senior World Championships is the same as for the World Cup, except that all national federations are entitled to send one athlete. The defending Junior World Champion in each discipline also receives an automatic entry. Unlike all other IBSF-sponsored races, the World Championships use a two-day, four-heat format, with rankings determined by total time for all four heats.

The 2016/17 World Championships were held at Königssee bobsleigh, luge, and skeleton track in Bavaria, 24–26 February 2017. Martins Dukurs of Latvia won the men's competition and Jacqueline Lölling of Germany won the women's competition. Because 2018 was an Olympic year, no World Championships were held for the 2017/18 season.

=== Junior World Championships ===
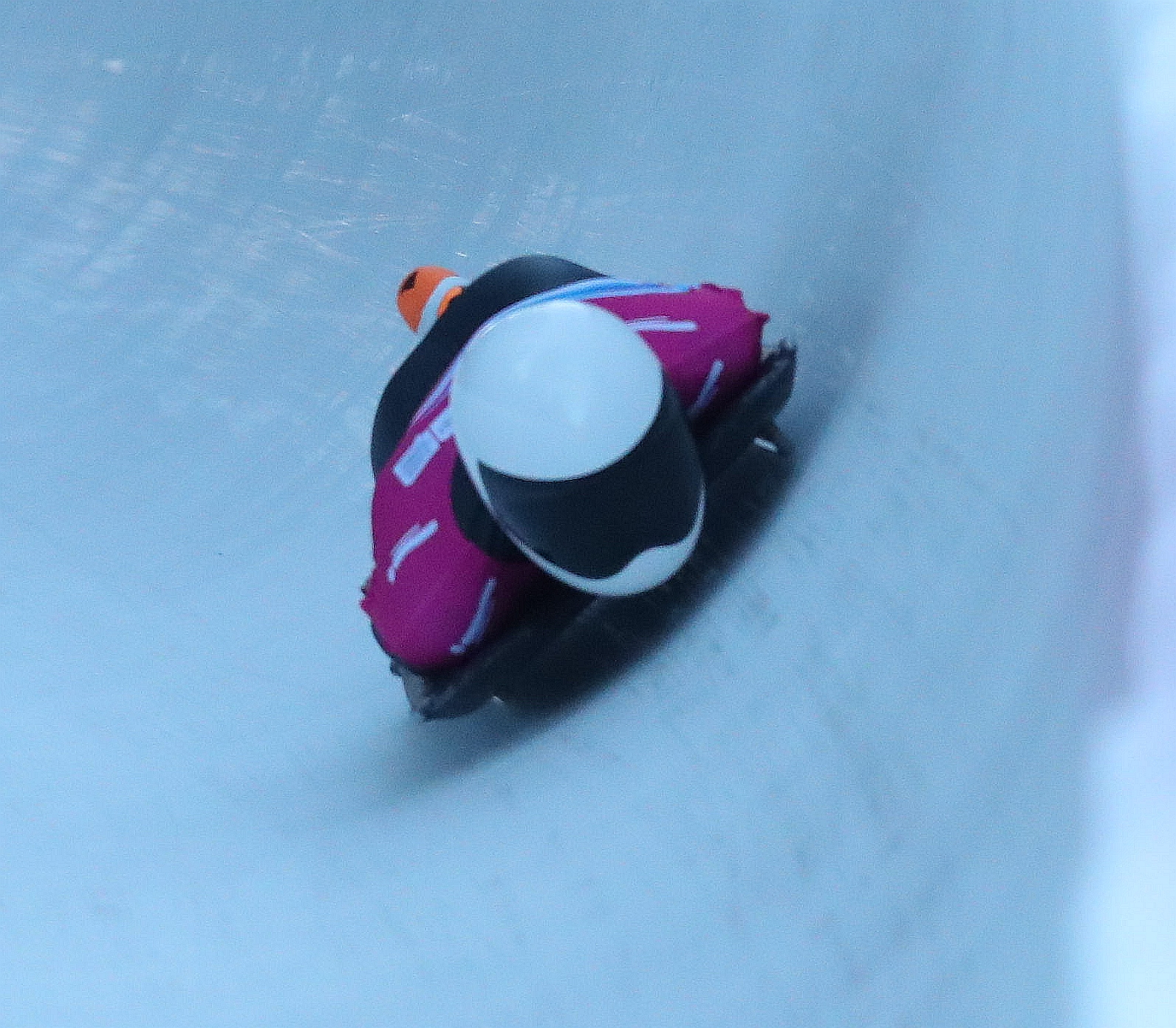
Men's Skeleton at the 2020 Winter Youth Olympics in Lausanne

The Junior World Championships are held every year, but are scheduled to avoid conflict with the Olympics and the Senior World Championships. Junior athletes are those who are under 23 years of age, or who turn 23 at some point during the competitive season. All countries are entitled to send up to three athletes to the Junior World Championships, subject to the requirement that each entrant must have finished at least three IBSF sanctioned competitions on at least two tracks in the previous two years.

The 2017–18 Junior World Championships were held on 25 January 2018 in St. Moritz, Switzerland, and the winners were Anna Fernstädt of Germany and Nikita Tregubov of Russia.

=== Olympic Winter Games ===
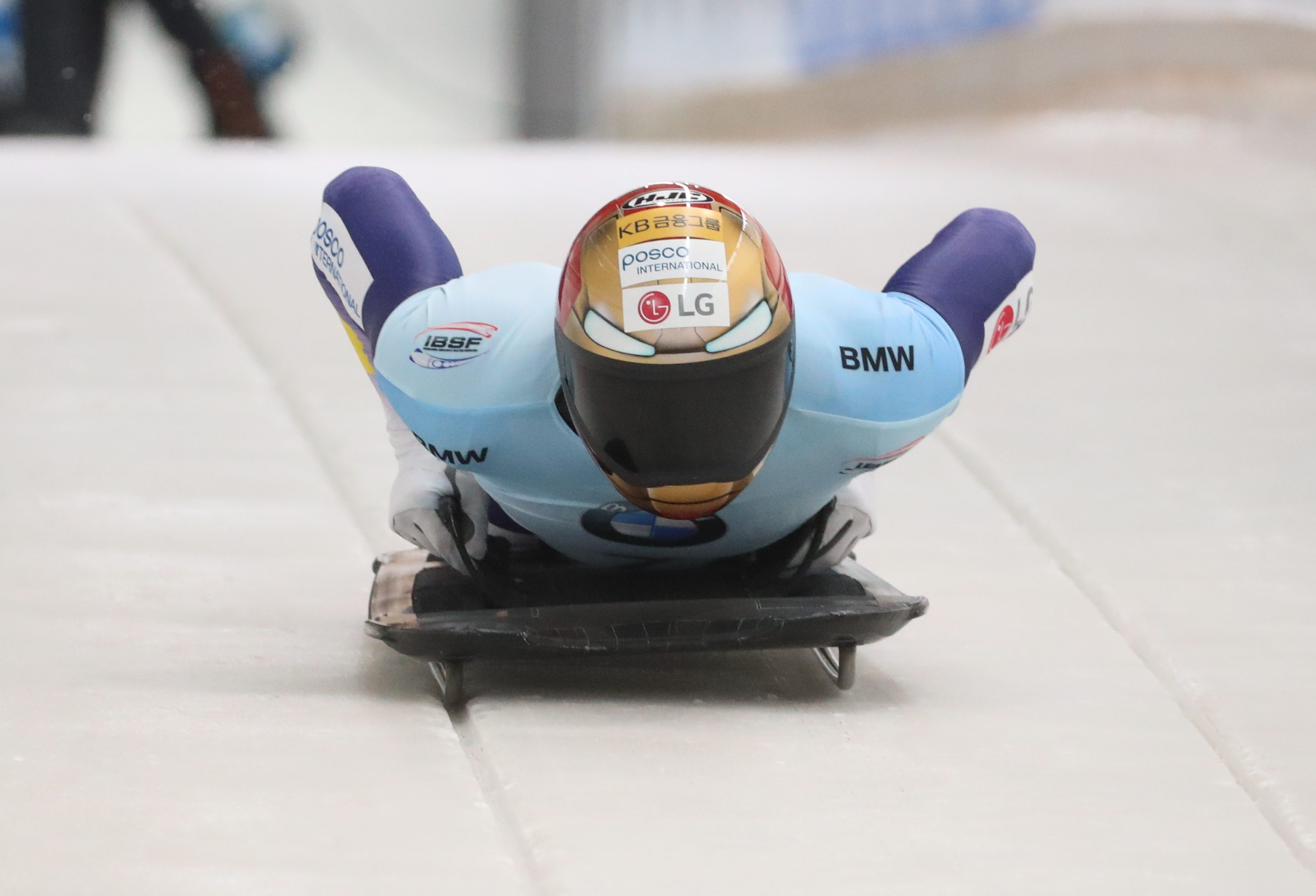
Yun Sung-bin

The skeleton event in the Winter Olympics uses the same two-day, four-heat format as the World Championships, but team quotas are significantly smaller. The International Olympic Committee assigns athlete quotas to national Olympic committees in cooperation with the IBSF and using the IBSF ranking system to determine qualification; 20 women and 30 men competed at the 2018 Winter Olympics in Pyeongchang, Korea, with one automatic quota going to the host country (Korea) for each gender. For men, three countries received three quota spots each, six were allocated two spots, and five got one; for women, two countries received three spots, four got two, and two got one. The ranking of the countries for quota assignment was based on their third-highest, second-highest, or highest ranked athlete in total IBSF ranking over the qualification period. In addition, three quota spots are reserved for countries whose continent did not receive any representation based on this assignment procedure.

National Olympic Committees may send athletes other than the ones whose rankings earned the quota spot, but the athletes chosen must be ranked in the top 60 (for men) or top 45 (for women) on the IBSF list and meet similar experience requirements to those that apply to the World Cup. However, IBSF rule 4.1 provides that, for the purposes of determining the top 60 (or top 45) qualification, lower-ranking athletes from countries which have already received a full quota are "cleaned" from the list before an athlete's ordinal ranking is determined This had the effect of allowing continental representatives for Africa into the 2018 games, as they would otherwise have been too low on the ranking list to qualify (notably, Nigerian slider Simidele Adeagbo was ranked 74th before cleaning, but was in the top 45 after application of rule 4.1).

== Sport ==
The accessibility of skeleton to amateurs may have been the catalyst for its upswing in popularity. Most notably, Nino Bibbia, a fruit and vegetable merchant from St. Moritz, Switzerland, took Olympic gold at the 1948 event. With the advent of the first artificially refrigerated track in 1969 at Königssee/Berchtesgaden, Germany, athletes are currently able to practice the sport regardless of weather conditions. The sport is also promoted by skeleton officials as a gateway sport to "train young, aspiring athletes ... for their future career in bobsleigh."

=== Track ===
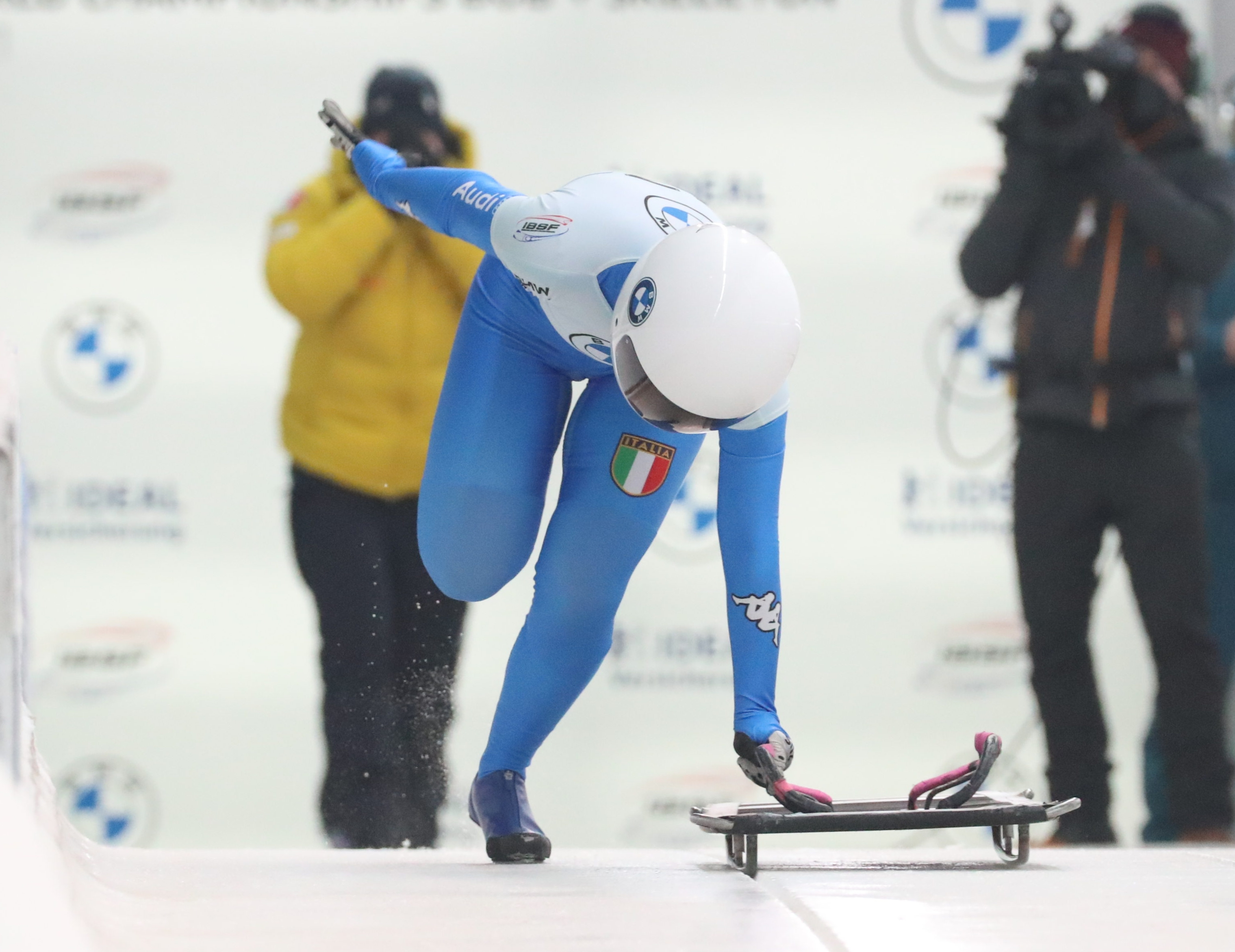
Alessia Crippa 1st run at the 2021 World Championships in Altenberg

=== Sled ===
According to the FIBT, "The 'toboggans' used in Alpine countries at the end of the 19th century were inspired by Canadian/Indian sleds used for transport". Various additions and redesigning efforts by athletes have led to the skeleton sleds used today. In 1892, L. P. Child introduced the "America", a new metal sled that revolutionized skeleton as a sport. The stripped-down design provided a compact sled with metal runners, and the design caught on quickly. In 1902, Arden Bott added a sliding seat to help athletes shift their weight forward and backward, a feature that is no longer included on modern sleds.

In 2010, the FIBT restricted the materials with which skeleton sleds are permitted to be made. Sled frames must be made of steel and may not include steering or braking mechanisms. The base plate, however, may be made of plastics. The handles and bumpers found along the sides of the sled help secure the athlete during a run.

Further specifications are included in the FIBT ruling regarding sled dimensions:

	Maximum combined weight (athlete + sled)	Maximum sled weight
Men	115 kg (253.5 lb)	43 kg (94.8 lb)
Women	102 kg (224.9 lb)	38 kg (83.8 lb)

Some athletes opt to attach ballasts if the combined weight of athlete and sled falls below the maximum combined weight. These ballasts may only be added to the sled, not the rider.

- Dimensions:
  - Length: 80–120 cm (31.5–47.2 in)
  - Height: 8–20 cm (3.1–7.9 in)
  - Distance between runners: 340–380 mm (13.4–15.0 in)

=== Equipment ===
- Alpine racing helmet with chin guard, or a skeleton-specific helmet
- Skin-tight racing speedsuit made of uncoated textile material
- Spiked shoes, similar to track spikes
- Goggles or face shield
- Optional elbow and shoulder pads under their suits
- Sled

== Organizations ==
Organization	Description
Alberta Skeleton Association	Located in Calgary, Alberta, home of the 1988 Winter Olympics. Offers racing and tuition. Has produced international-level athletes.
Bavarian Skeleton Club	Established in 1969 in Munich, Germany, and headed by Senator Hans Riedmayer and Max Probst (himself a skeleton bob engineer), the club was important in organizing some of the first national and international skeleton events in Konigsee, Tirol, and Czechoslovakia.
Brazilian Ice Sports Federation	The Official Brazilian Bob Skeleton organization was established in 1996 in Rio de Janeiro. Their website includes a great deal of information regarding the sport, its history, events, photographs, news and updates on athletes and the sport.
British Bob Skeleton Association	The Official British Bob Skeleton organization whose members include both athletes and fans. Their website includes a great deal of information regarding the sport, its history, events, photographs, news and updates on athletes and the sport.
International Bobsleigh and Skeleton Federation	Established in 1923 as Federation Internationale de Bobsleigh et de Tobogganing (FIBT), and renamed in 2015, the FIBSF is the official governing body for the sport. Its headquarters are in Lausanne, Switzerland.
St. Moritz Tobogganing Club	A private club founded in 1887 by Major Bulpett of St. Moritz. Membership is selected from applicants on their "Supplementary List". St. Moritz is the birthplace of the sport.

== Olympic medal table ==
=== Men ===
2026 Olympic champion: (gold) Matt Weston (GBR) (silver) Axel Jungk (GER) (bronze) Christopher Grotheer (GER)

Rank	Nation	Gold	Silver	Bronze	Total
1	United States	2	2	1	5
2	Canada	2	1	0	3
3	Germany	1	2	1	4
4	Great Britain	1	0	3	4
5	Russia	1	0	1	2
6	Italy	1	0	0	1
6	South Korea	1	0	0	1
8	Latvia	0	2	0	2
9	Olympic Athletes from Russia	0	1	1	2
10	Austria	0	1	0	1
11	China	0	0	1	1
11	Switzerland	0	0	1	1
Totals (12 entries)		9	9	9	27

=== Women ===
2026 Olympic champion: (gold) Janine Flock (AUT) (silver) Susanne Kreher (GER) (bronze) Jacqueline Pfeifer (GER)

Rank	Nation	Gold	Silver	Bronze	Total
1	Great Britain	3	1	2	6
2	Germany	1	3	2	6
3	United States	1	2	0	3
4	Austria	1	0	0	1
4	Switzerland	1	0	0	1
6	Australia	0	1	0	1
7	Canada	0	0	1	1
7	Netherlands	0	0	1	1
7	Russia	0	0	1	1
Totals (9 entries)		7	7	7	21

=== Total Olympic ranking (2026) ===
Rank	Nation	Gold	Silver	Bronze	Total
1	Great Britain	4	1	5	10
2	United States	3	4	1	8
3	Germany	2	3	1	6
4	Canada	2	1	1	4
5	Russia	1	0	2	3
5	Switzerland	1	0	2	3
7	Italy	1	0	0	1
7	South Korea	1	0	0	1
9	Latvia	0	2	0	2
10	Australia	0	1	0	1
10	Austria	0	1	0	1
10	Olympic Athletes from Russia	0	1	0	1
13	China	0	0	1	1
13	Netherlands	0	0	1	1
Totals (14 entries)		15	14	14	43

== Brain injury ==
Both skeleton and its sister sport, bobsledding, have been associated with traumatic brain injury, a phenomenon known as "sled head". Multiple suicides of former athletes have been linked to these sports.

== See also ==
- FIBT World Championships
- List of Skeleton World Cup champions
- Bobsleigh
- Luge
