= Speed skating at the 1948 Winter Olympics – Men's 500 metres =

Men's 500 metres speed skating at the V Olympic Winter Games
- Pictogram for speed skating
- Venue: St. Moritz Olympic Ice Rink
- Date: 31 January 1948
- Competitors: 42 from 15 nations
- Winning time: 43.1 OR

Medalists
1st place, gold medalist(s)		Finn Helgesen	Norway
2nd place, silver medalist(s)		Ken Bartholomew	United States
2nd place, silver medalist(s)		Thomas Byberg	Norway
2nd place, silver medalist(s)		Robert Fitzgerald	United States

The 500 metres speed skating event was part of the speed skating at the 1948 Winter Olympics programme. The competition was held on Saturday, 31 January 1948. Forty-two speed skaters from 15 nations competed.

== Medalists ==
Gold	Silver	Bronze
Finn Helgesen; Norway	Ken Bartholomew; United States Thomas Byberg; Norway Robert Fitzgerald; United States	

== Records ==
These were the standing world and Olympic records (in seconds) prior to the 1948 Winter Olympics.

World record	41.8(*)	(Norway) Hans Engnestangen	Davos (SUI)	5 February 1938
Olympic Record	43.4	(Finland) Clas Thunberg	St. Moritz (SUI)	13 February 1928
Olympic Record	43.4	(Norway) Bernt Evensen	St. Moritz (SUI)	13 February 1928
Olympic Record	43.4(**)	(United States) Jack Shea	Lake Placid (USA)	4 February 1932
Olympic Record	43.4	(Norway) Ivar Ballangrud	Garmisch-Partenkirchen (GER)	11 February 1936

(*) The record was set in a high altitude venue (more than 1000 metres above sea level) and on naturally frozen ice.

(**) This time was set in pack-style format, having all competitors skate at the same time.

Five speed skaters were faster than the standing Olympic record. Finn Helgesen set a time of 43.1 seconds.

== Results ==
Place	Athlete	Time
1	Finn Helgesen (NOR)	43.1
2	Ken Bartholomew (USA)	43.2
2	Thomas Byberg (NOR)	43.2
2	Robert Fitzgerald (USA)	43.2
5	Ken Henry (USA)	43.3
6	Sverre Farstad (NOR)	43.6
6	Torodd Hauer (NOR)	43.6
6	Delbert Lamb (USA)	43.6
6	Frank Stack (CAN)	43.6
10	Mats Bolmstedt (SWE)	43.7
11	Halle Janemar (SWE)	44.0
11	Åke Seyffarth (SWE)	44.0
13	Keijo Lehdikkö (FIN)	44.7
14	János Kilián (HUN)	44.8
14	Antero Ojala (FIN)	44.8
16	Lassi Parkkinen (FIN)	45.2
17	Gordon Audley (CAN)	45.3
17	Kalevi Laitinen (FIN)	45.3
19	Abraham Hardy (CAN)	45.5
20	Göthe Hedlund (SWE)	45.6
21	Choi Yong-jin (KOR)	45.7
21	Kornél Pajor (HUN)	45.7
23	Aad de Koning (NED)	45.9
23	Lee Hyo-chang (KOR)	45.9
25	Johnny Cronshey (GBR)	46.0
26	Vladimír Kolář (TCH)	46.1
27	Anton Huiskes (NED)	46.2
28	Kees Broekman (NED)	46.3
29	Aage Justesen (DEN)	46.4
29	Jan Langedijk (NED)	46.4
29	Bruce Peppin (GBR)	46.4
32	Dennis Blundell (GBR)	46.5
32	Enrico Musolino (ITA)	46.5
34	Ákos Elekfy (HUN)	46.8
35	Henry Howes (GBR)	46.9
36	Giorgio Cattaneo (ITA)	47.2
37	Iván Ruttkay (HUN)	47.4
37	Gustav Slanec (AUT)	47.4
39	Rudolf Kleiner (SUI)	47.8
40	Pierre Huylebroeck (BEL)	48.3
41	Ferdinand Preindl (AUT)	48.7
–	Craig Mackay (CAN)	DNF
