= Speed skating at the 1948 Winter Olympics – Men's 5000 metres =

Men's 5000 metres speed skating at the V Olympic Winter Games
- Pictogram for speed skating
- Venue: St. Moritz Olympic Ice Rink
- Date: 1 February 1948
- Competitors: 40 from 14 nations
- Winning time: 8:29.4

Medalists
| 1st place, gold medalist(s) | | Reidar Liaklev | Norway |
| 2nd place, silver medalist(s) | | Odd Lundberg | Norway |
| 3rd place, bronze medalist(s) | | Göthe Hedlund | Sweden |

The 5000 metres speed skating event was part of the speed skating at the 1948 Winter Olympics programme. The competition was held on Sunday, 1 February 1948. Forty speed skaters from 14 nations competed.

== Medalists ==
| Gold | Silver | Bronze |
|---|---|---|
| Reidar Liaklev (NOR) | Odd Lundberg (NOR) | Göthe Hedlund (SWE) |

== Records ==
These were the standing world and Olympic records (in minutes) prior to the 1948 Winter Olympics.

| World record | 8:13.7(*) | (Sweden) Åke Seyffarth | Davos (SUI) | 3 February 1941 |
| Olympic Record | 8:19.6 | (Norway) Ivar Ballangrud | Garmisch-Partenkirchen (GER) | 12 February 1936 |

(*) The record was set in a high altitude venue (more than 1000 metres above sea level) and on naturally frozen ice.

== Results ==
| Place | Athlete | Time |
|---|---|---|
| 1 | Reidar Liaklev (NOR) | 8:29.4 |
| 2 | Odd Lundberg (NOR) | 8:32.7 |
| 3 | Göthe Hedlund (SWE) | 8:34.8 |
| 4 | Harry Jansson (SWE) | 8:34.9 |
| 5 | Jan Langedijk (NED) | 8:36.2 |
| 6 | Kees Broekman (NED) | 8:37.3 |
| 7 | Åke Seyffarth (SWE) | 8:37.9 |
| 8 | Pentti Lammio (FIN) | 8:40.7 |
| 9 | Lassi Parkkinen (FIN) | 8:45.0 |
| 10 | Kornél Pajor (HUN) | 8:45.2 |
| 11 | Johnny Cronshey (GBR) | 8:45.6 |
| 12 | Anton Huiskes (NED) | 8:46.4 |
| 13 | Iván Ruttkay (HUN) | 8:46.9 |
| 14 | Craig Mackay (CAN) | 8:47.2 |
| 15 | Kalevi Laitinen (FIN) | 8:53.0 |
| 16 | Rune Hammarström (SWE) | 8:53.8 |
| 17 | Ray Blum (USA) | 8:54.4 |
| 18 | Ken Henry (USA) | 8:56.0 |
| 19 | Henry Howes (GBR) | 8:56.6 |
| 20 | Aad de Koning (NED) | 8:57.6 |
| 21 | Louis Rupprecht (USA) | 8:58.4 |
| 22 | Vladimír Kolář (TCH) | 8:58.9 |
| 23 | Henry Heppe (NOR) | 9:03.0 |
| 24 | Max Stiepl (AUT) | 9:05.0 |
| 25 | Lee Hiyo-Chang (KOR) | 9:05.4 |
| 26 | Antero Ojala (FIN) | 9:06.2 |
| 27 | Richard Solem (USA) | 9:10.4 |
| 28 | Tommy Ross (GBR) | 9:18.2 |
| 29 | Ákos Elekfy (HUN) | 9:18.6 |
| 30 | Pierre Huylebroeck (BEL) | 9:20.3 |
| 31 | Guido Caroli (ITA) | 9:21.3 |
| 32 | Dennis Blundell (GBR) | 9:22.2 |
| 33 | Heinz Hügelshofer (SUI) | 9:28.6 |
| 34 | Sepp Rogger (SUI) | 9:29.3 |
| 35 | Gedeon Ladányi (HUN) | 9:30.2 |
| 36 | Enrico Musolino (ITA) | 9:32.3 |
| 37 | Fernando Alloni (ITA) | 9:36.3 |
| 38 | Lee Chang-Kook (KOR) | 9:36.7 |
| 39 | Alfred Altenburger (SUI) | 9:40.6 |
| – | Charles Mathiesen (NOR) | DNF |
