= Speed skating at the 1948 Winter Olympics – Men's 1500 metres =

Men's 1500 metres speed skating at the V Olympic Winter Games
- Pictogram for speed skating
- Venue: St. Moritz Olympic Ice Rink
- Date: 2 February 1948
- Competitors: 45 from 14 nations
- Winning time: 2:17.6

Medalists
1st place, gold medalist(s)		Sverre Farstad	Norway
2nd place, silver medalist(s)		Åke Seyffarth	Sweden
3rd place, bronze medalist(s)		Odd Lundberg	Norway

The 1500 metres speed skating event was part of the speed skating at the 1948 Winter Olympics programme. The competition was held on Monday, 2 February 1948. Forty-five speed skaters from 14 nations competed.

== Medalists ==
Gold	Silver	Bronze
Sverre Farstad; Norway	Åke Seyffarth; Sweden	Odd Lundberg; Norway

== Records ==
These were the standing world and Olympic records (in minutes) prior to the 1948 Winter Olympics.

World record	2:13.8(*)	(Norway) Hans Engnestangen	Davos (SUI)	29 January 1939
Olympic Record	2:19.2	(Norway) Charles Mathiesen	Garmisch-Partenkirchen (GER)	13 February 1936

(*) The record was set in a high altitude venue (more than 1000 metres above sea level) and on naturally frozen ice.

All three medalists were faster than the standing Olympic record. Sverre Farstad set the new Olympic record with a time of 2:17.6 seconds.

== Results ==
Place	Athlete	Time
1	Sverre Farstad (NOR)	2:17.6
2	Åke Seyffarth (SWE)	2:18.1
3	Odd Lundberg (NOR)	2:18.9
4	Lassi Parkkinen (FIN)	2:19.6
5	Harry Jansson (SWE)	2:20.0
6	John Werket (USA)	2:20.2
7	Kalevi Laitinen (FIN)	2:20.3
8	Göthe Hedlund (SWE)	2:20.7
9	Kees Broekman (NED)	2:21.0
10	Gunnar Konsmo (NOR)	2:21.2
10	Iván Ruttkay (HUN)	2:21.2
12	Antero Ojala (FIN)	2:21.4
13	Jan Langedijk (NED)	2:21.9
14	Kornél Pajor (HUN)	2:22.2
15	János Kilián (HUN)	2:22.5
16	Ivar Martinsen (NOR)	2:22.6
17	Mats Bolmstedt (SWE)	2:22.8
18	Henry Howes (GBR)	2:23.0
19	Lee Hiyo-Chang (KOR)	2:23.3
20	Ray Blum (USA)	2:23.4
21	Pentti Lammio (FIN)	2:23.9
22	Ken Henry (USA)	2:24.6
23	Bruce Peppin (GBR)	2:24.7
24	Anton Huiskes (NED)	2:25.0
25	Aad de Koning (NED)	2:25.3
26	Vladimír Kolář (TCH)	2:25.6
27	Frank Stack (CAN)	2:25.7
28	Robert Fitzgerald (USA)	2:27.0
29	Abraham Hardy (CAN)	2:28.5
30	Dennis Blundell (GBR)	2:29.2
31	Choi Young-Chin (KOR)	2:29.8
32	Gordon Audley (CAN)	2:30.0
32	Enrico Musolino (ITA)	2:30.0
34	Giorgio Cattaneo (ITA)	2:30.5
34	Hanspeter Vogt (SUI)	2:30.5
36	Guido Caroli (ITA)	2:30.9
36	Lee Jong-guk (KOR)	2:30.9
38	Max Stiepl (AUT)	2:31.2
39	Gedeon Ladányi (HUN)	2:31.3
40	Gustav Slanec (AUT)	2:31.9
41	Tommy Ross (GBR)	2:32.6
42	Rudolf Kleiner (SUI)	2:33.0
43	Sepp Rogger (SUI)	2:34.7
44	Ferdinand Preindl (AUT)	2:38.6
45	Pierre Huylebroeck (BEL)	2:40.2
