= Speed skating at the 1948 Winter Olympics – Men's 10,000 metres =

Men's 10.000 metres speed skating at the V Olympic Winter Games
- Pictogram for speed skating
- Venue: St. Moritz Olympic Ice Rink
- Date: 3 February 1948
- Competitors: 47 from 11 nations
- Winning time: 17:26.3

Medalists
1st place, gold medalist(s)		Åke Seyffarth	Sweden
2nd place, silver medalist(s)		Lassi Parkkinen	Finland
3rd place, bronze medalist(s)		Pentti Lammio	Finland

The 10,000 metres speed skating event was part of the speed skating at the 1948 Winter Olympics programme. The competition was held on Tuesday,3 February 1948. Twenty-seven speed skaters from eleven nations competed.

== Medalists ==
Gold	Silver	Bronze
Åke Seyffarth; Sweden	Lassi Parkkinen; Finland	Pentti Lammio; Finland

== Records ==
These were the standing world and Olympic records (in minutes) prior to the 1948 Winter Olympics.

World record	17:01.5(*)	(Norway) Charles Mathiesen	Hamar (NOR)	3 March 1940
Olympic Record	17:24.3	(Norway) Ivar Ballangrud	Garmisch-Partenkirchen (GER)	14 February 1936

(*) The record was set on naturally frozen ice.

== Results ==
Place	Athlete	Time
1	Åke Seyffarth (SWE)	17:26.3
2	Lassi Parkkinen (FIN)	17:36.0
3	Pentti Lammio (FIN)	17:42.7
4	Kornél Pajor (HUN)	17:45.6
5	Kees Broekman (NED)	17:54.7
6	Jan Langedijk (NED)	17:55.3
7	Odd Lundberg (NOR)	18:05.8
8	Harry Jansson (SWE)	18:08.0
9	Rune Hammarström (SWE)	18:39.6
10	Max Stiepl (AUT)	19:25.5
11	John Werket (USA)	19:44.0
12	Pierre Huylebroeck (BEL)	19:54.8
13	Craig Mackay (CAN)	20:15.5
14	Anton Huiskes (NED)	20:16.4
15	Iván Ruttkay (HUN)	20:16.5
16	János Kilián (HUN)	20:23.8
17	Louis Rupprecht (USA)	21:20.3
18	Art Seaman (USA)	21:34.8
19	Richard Solem (USA)	26:22.4
–	Göthe Hedlund (SWE)	DNF
–	Reidar Liaklev (NOR)	DNF
–	Kalevi Laitinen (FIN)	DNF
–	Henry Wahl (NOR)	DNF
–	Johnny Cronshey (GBR)	DNF
–	Hjalmar Andersen (NOR)	DNF
–	Henry Howes (GBR)	DNF
–	Vladimír Kolář (TCH)	DQ
