= Norway at the 1948 Winter Olympics =

- IOC code: NOR
- NOC: Norwegian Sports Federation

in St. Moritz
- Competitors: 49 (45 men, 4 women) in 7 sports
- Flag bearer: Birger Ruud (ski jumping)
- Medals Ranked 1st: Gold 4 Silver 3 Bronze 3 Total 10

Winter Olympics appearances (overview)
- 1924; 1928; 1932; 1936; 1948; 1952; 1956; 1960; 1964; 1968; 1972; 1976; 1980; 1984; 1988; 1992; 1994; 1998; 2002; 2006; 2010; 2014; 2018; 2022; 2026

Norway competed at the 1948 Winter Olympics in St. Moritz, Switzerland.

== Medalists ==
Medal	Name	Sport	Event
Gold	Petter Hugsted	Ski jumping	Men's normal hill
Gold	Finn Helgesen	Speed skating	Men's 500m
Gold	Sverre Farstad	Speed skating	Men's 1500m
Gold	Reidar Liaklev	Speed skating	Men's 5000m
Silver	Birger Ruud	Ski jumping	Men's normal hill
Silver	Thomas Byberg	Speed skating	Men's 500m
Silver	Odd Lundberg	Speed skating	Men's 5000m
Bronze	Erling Evensen; Olav Økern; Reidar Nyborg; Olav Hagen	Cross-country skiing	Men's 4 x 10 km relay
Bronze	Thorleif Schjelderup	Ski jumping	Men's normal hill
Bronze	Odd Lundberg	Speed skating	Men's 1500m

== Alpine skiing ==
Men

Athlete	Event	Race 1		Race 2		Total	
Athlete	Event	Time	Rank	Time	Rank	Time	Rank
Johnny Lunde	Downhill					DNF	–
Stein Eriksen	Downhill					3:15.1	31
Sverre Johannessen	Downhill					3:12.1	25
Marius Eriksen	Downhill					3:09.4	20
Bjarne Arentz	Downhill					3:09.0	16
Sverre Lassen-Urdahl	Downhill					3:06.4	11
Alf Opheim	Slalom	1:36.4	46	1:15.0	33	2:51.4	41
Stein Eriksen	Slalom	1:24.4	33	1:08.0	20	2:32.4	29
Jack Nielsen	Slalom	1:22.0	32	1:07.8	19	2:29.8	26
Bjarne Arentz	Slalom	1:16.2	24	1:11.5	27	2:27.7	23

Men's combined

The downhill part of this event was held along with the main medal event of downhill skiing. For athletes competing in both events, the same time was used (see table above for the results). The slalom part of the event was held separate from the main medal event of slalom skiing (included in table below).

Athlete	Slalom			Total (downhill + slalom)	
Athlete	Time 1	Time 2	Rank	Points	Rank
Stein Eriksen	1:51.8 (+0:05)	1:11.5	46	32.50	32
Sverre Johannessen	1:26.2	1:14.8	27	21.00	22
Marius Eriksen	1:21.6	1:19.4	27	19.68	20
Bjarne Arentz	1:20.8	1:15.5	21	17.17	17

Women

Athlete	Event	Race 1		Race 2		Total	
Athlete	Event	Time	Rank	Time	Rank	Time	Rank
Borghild Niskin	Downhill					2:44.4	23
Laila Schou Nilsen	Downhill					2:32.4	7
Borghild Niskin	Slalom	DSQ	–	–	–	DSQ	–
Laila Schou Nilsen	Slalom	1:06.8	14	1:04.7	15	2:11.5	14

Women's combined

The downhill part of this event was held along with the main medal event of downhill skiing. For athletes competing in both events, the same time was used (see table above for the results). The slalom part of the event was held separate from the main medal event of slalom skiing (included in table below).

Athlete	Slalom			Total (downhill + slalom)	
Athlete	Time 1	Time 2	Rank	Points	Rank
Borghild Niskin	1:12.6	1:13.5	21	24.37	19
Laila Schou Nilsen	1:11.0	1:06.0	13	12.14	13

== Bobsleigh ==
Sled	Athletes	Event	Run 1		Run 2		Run 3		Run 4		Total	
Sled	Athletes	Event	Time	Rank	Time	Rank	Time	Rank	Time	Rank	Time	Rank
NOR-1	Bjarne Schrøen; Gunnar Thoresen	Two-man	1:27.1	13	1:27.1	15	1:26.1	13	1:26.2	13	5:46.5	13
NOR-2	Arne Holst; Ivar Johansen	Two-man	1:25.6	9	1:25.0	8	1:23.7	5	1:23.9	4	5:38.2	7

Sled	Athletes	Event	Run 1		Run 2		Run 3		Run 4		Total	
Sled	Athletes	Event	Time	Rank	Time	Rank	Time	Rank	Time	Rank	Time	Rank
NOR-1	Arne Holst; Ivar Johansen; Reidar Berg; Alf Large	Four-man	1:17.3	3	1:20.8	3	1:21.4	1	1:23.0	6	5:22.5	5
NOR-2	Bjarne Schrøen; Gunnar Thoresen; Arnold Dyrdahl; Benn John Valsø	Four-man	1:20.0	11	1:22.6	10	1:23.6	10	1:23.5	8	5:29.7	10

== Cross-country skiing ==
Men

Event	Athlete	Race	
Event	Athlete	Time	Rank
18 km	Kaare Østerdahl	1'24:20	32
18 km	Eilert Dahl	1'22:52	27
18 km	Olaf Dufseth	1'21:50	18
18 km	Reidar Nyborg	1'21:47	17
18 km	Erling Evensen	1'21:40	15
18 km	Olav Odden	1'21:35	14
18 km	Olav Økern	1'20:37	13
18 km	Olav Hagen	1'19:05	9
50 km	Leif Haugen	DNF	–
50 km	Thorleif Vangen	DNF	–
50 km	Martin Jære	4'17:11	10
50 km	Kristian Bjørn	4'15:21	9

Men's 4 x 10 km relay

Athletes	Race	
Athletes	Time	Rank
Erling Evensen; Olav Økern; Reidar Nyborg; Olav Hagen	2'44:33	3rd place, bronze medalist(s)

== Figure skating ==
Women

Athlete	CF	FS	Points	Places	Final rank
Marit Henie	21	23	133.111	194	22

Pairs

Athletes	Points	Places	Final rank
Margot Walle; Allan Fjeldheim	9.281	118.5	10

== Nordic combined ==
Events:

- 18 km cross-country skiing
- normal hill ski jumping

The cross-country skiing part of this event was combined with the main medal event, meaning that athletes competing here were skiing for two disciplines at the same time. Details can be found above in this article, in the cross-country skiing section.

The ski jumping (normal hill) event was held separate from the main medal event of ski jumping, results can be found in the table below. Athletes would perform three jumps, of which the two best jumps (distance and form) were counted.

Athlete	Event	Cross-country		Ski Jumping					Total	
Athlete	Event	Points	Rank	Distance 1	Distance 2	Distance 3	Points	Rank	Points	Rank
Kaare Østerdahl	Individual	198.00	14	55.0	62.0	61.0	206.2	11	404.20	12
Eilert Dahl	Individual	205.50	10	62.0	62.5	63.0	208.8	8	414.30	6
Olaf Dufseth	Individual	211.50	5	61.0	59.0	61.0	201.1	16	412.60	8
Olav Odden	Individual	212.25	3	59.0	53.5	55.5	196.9	19	409.15	11

== Ski jumping ==
Athlete	Event	Distance 1	Distance 2	Total points	Rank
Asbjørn Ruud	Normal hill	58.0	67.5	220.2	7
Thorleif Schjelderup	Normal hill	64.0	67.0	225.1	3rd place, bronze medalist(s)
Birger Ruud	Normal hill	64.0	67.0	226.6	2nd place, silver medalist(s)
Petter Hugsted	Normal hill	65.0	70.0	228.1	1st place, gold medalist(s)

== Speed skating ==
Men

Event	Athlete	Race	
Event	Athlete	Time	Rank
500 m	Torodd Hauer	43.6	6
500 m	Sverre Farstad	43.6	6
500 m	Thomas Byberg	43.2	2nd place, silver medalist(s)
500 m	Finn Helgesen	43.1 OR	1st place, gold medalist(s)
1500 m	Ivar Martinsen	2:22.6	16
1500 m	Gunnar Konsmo	2:21.2	10
1500 m	Odd Lundberg	2:18.9	3rd place, bronze medalist(s)
1500 m	Sverre Farstad	2:17.6 OR	1st place, gold medalist(s)
5000 m	Charles Mathiesen	DNF	–
5000 m	Henry Hebbe	9:03.0	23
5000 m	Odd Lundberg	8:32.7	2nd place, silver medalist(s)
5000 m	Reidar Liaklev	8:29.4	1st place, gold medalist(s)
10,000 m	Henry Wahl	DNF	–
10,000 m	Reidar Liaklev	DNF	–
10,000 m	Hjalmar Andersen	DNF	–
10,000 m	Odd Lundberg	18:05.8	7
