= Sverre Farstad =

Norwegian speed skater

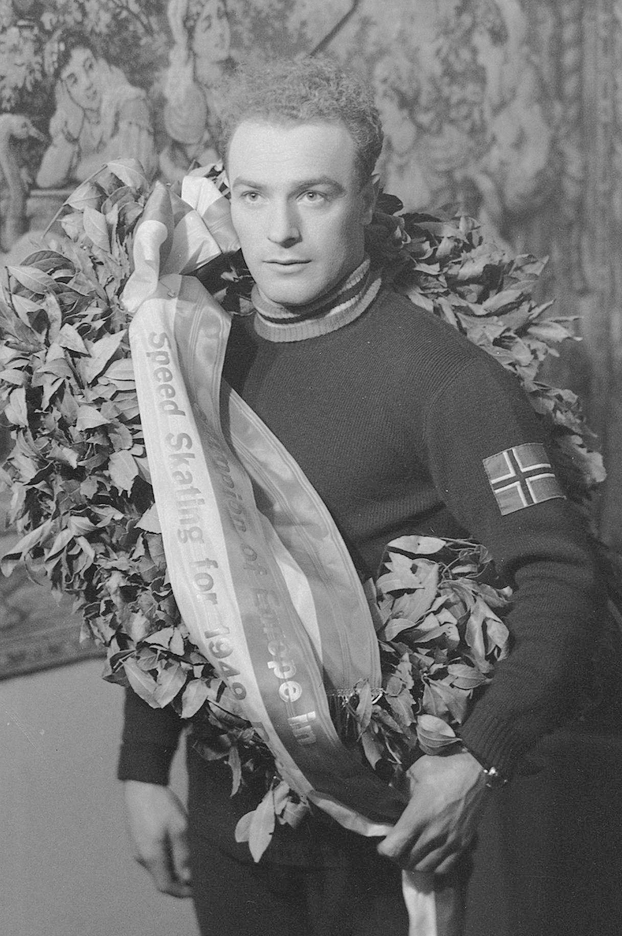
- Farstad in 1949

Personal information
- Born: 8 February 1920 Trondheim, Norway
- Died: 27 March 1978 (aged 58)

Sport
- Country: Norway
- Sport: Speed skating
- Club: Sportsklubben Falken

Achievements and titles
- Personal bests: 500 m: 41.8 (1949); 1000 m: 1:29.7 (1950); 1500 m: 2:13.6 (1949); 3000 m: 4:59.2 (1949); 5000 m: 8:15.4 (1949); 10 000 m: 17:39.7 (1949)
Medal record
Representing Norway
Olympic Games
Gold medal – first place	1948 St. Moritz	1,500 m
World Championships
Silver medal – second place	1947 Oslo	Allround
European Championships
Gold medal – first place	1949 Davos	Allround
Bronze medal – third place	1947 Stockholm	Allround

Sverre Farstad (8 February 1920 – 27 March 1978) was a Norwegian speed skater representing Sportsklubben Falken, Trondheim, as part of the Falken Trio also including Henry Wahl and Hjalmar Andersen. Farstad won one Olympic gold medal and one European Championship in his three-year international career.

== Pre St. Moritz ==
Before World War II, Farstad was active in workers races, and came second in the Norwegian Workers' Championship on the 5,000 m in 1940. During the war, he trained weightlifting and gymnastics in Trondheim, and returned to international competition by winning bronze at the European Championship 1947, where he won the 1,500 metres, and silver at the World Championship, where he won both 500 and 1,500 m, and was 2.2 seconds from becoming world champion by virtue of winning three distances. Instead, he finished second in the overall standings after finishing 30.9 seconds behind Lassi Parkkinen on 10,000 metres.

He was awarded Egebergs Ærespris in 1947, having won two silver medals in Norwegian weightlifting championships, and he also won a bronze in rowing. Farstad also competed in boxing, cycling, sport shooting, swimming, and amateur wrestling.

== 1948 St. Moritz ==
Farstad was selected for the Norwegian team at the 1948 Winter Olympics at St. Moritz, and was a favourite on the 1,500 m. He won the race with a time of 2:17.6; though Swede Åke Seyffarth in a later pair was ahead on all three laps before the finish, but Farstad's final lap of 37.6 seconds was unbeatable, and Seyffarth finished 0.5 seconds behind. Farstad became the first person from Trøndelag to win Olympic gold. He also finished sixth on the 500 metres event. After the olympics, he received an overwhelming welcome in Trondheim, along with silver medalist Thomas Byberg and the other olympic skaters from Trøndelag.

Two weeks after the Games, Farstad took part in the European Championships at Hamar, finishing fourth after placing 11th and 12th on the two longest distances, though he won the 1,500 m again. He had a 22-second lead on Reidar Liaklev after three distances, but failed to hold on to it after Liaklev's race of 17:24.9. At the World Championships in Helsinki two weeks later, however, Farstad fell down to seventh on the 1,500, two seconds behind winner John Werket, and finished eleventh in the allround standings.

== Post St. Moritz ==
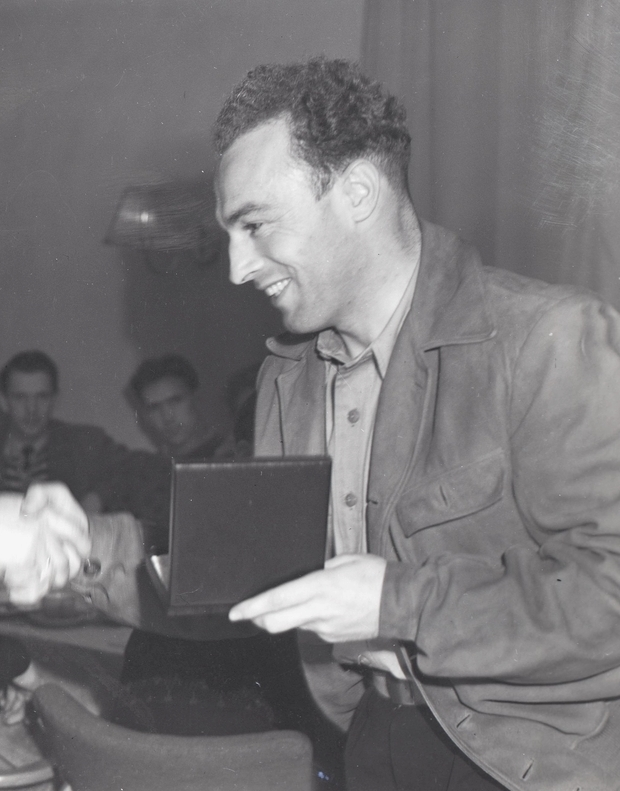
Farstad receives an award

Farstad never became Norwegian Champion; in 1949 he was beaten by Reidar Liaklev and finished second. However, returning to the canton of Graubünden where he had already won one Olympic medal, Farstad won the 1949 European Championships. Farstad started by skating the 500 metres in 41.8 seconds, equalling Hans Engnestangen's world record, and beating his closest competitor by 1.6 seconds. He was beaten by Kornél Pajor on the 5,000 metres, who set a new world record, but still led by 2.2 points after the first day. By winning the 1,500 metres by 2.5 seconds, in a time one tenth of a second behind the world record, he had taken a lead of 3.03 points, more than a minute, before the final 10,000 metres. Thus, finishing eleventh out of twelve finishers did not matter; he won the championship by nearly a point, bettered the previous world best mark by two points, and set the first official world record for the big combination. The record stood for six years.

Two weeks later, Farstad, who had been taken ill after the European Championship, failed to qualify for the 10,000 metres at the World Championship in Oslo, which were arranged in warm weather. He was seventh after three distances, but his 16th place on the 5,000 meant he was not qualified for the final distance. That was his last international allround championship, but he won the 500 metres in the Norwegian Championship in 1950, as well as winning the 500 metres in national matches against Sweden in 1950 and 1951. This was combined with full-time work as a journalist for Arbeiderbladet, a job he kept until his death in 1978. He was also part-time national coach of the Italian team between 1957 and 1960, coaching Renato De Riva to become the first Italian to qualify for the 10,000 metres in an international championship after World War II.

== World record ==
Over the course of his career, Farstad skated one world record:

Discipline	Time	Date	Location
Big combination	188.958	6 February 1949	(Switzerland) Davos

Source: SpeedSkatingStats.com

Note that Farstad was the first world record holder on the big combination since this was the first time that the big combination was an official world record event, as decided by the International Skating Union.

== Personal records ==
To put these personal records in perspective, the WR column lists the official world records on the dates that Farstad skated his personal records.

Event	Result	Date	Venue	WR
500 m	41.8	5 February 1949	Davos	41.8
1,000 m	1:29.7	18 January 1950	Gjøvik	1:28.4
1,500 m	2:13.9	6 February 1949	Davos	2:13.8
3,000 m	4:59.2	12 February 1949	Trondheim	4:45.7
5,000 m	8:15.4	5 February 1949	Davos	8:13.7
10,000 m	17:39.7	6 February 1949	Davos	17:01.5
Big combination	188.958	6 February 1949	Davos	none

Remarkably, Farstad's personal record on the big combination (188.958) is the same as his Adelskalender score. This is because at the 1949 European Championships, he skated new personal records on all four big combination distances, an achievement that also made him the first official world record holder on the big combination. His highest ranking on the Adelskalender was a third place.

Awards
Preceded by Godtfred Holmvang	Egebergs Ærespris; 1947	Succeeded by Martin Stokken
