= Hungary at the 1948 Winter Olympics =

- IOC code: HUN
- NOC: Hungarian Olympic Committee
- Website: www.olimpia.hu (in Hungarian and English)

in St. Moritz, Switzerland 30 January–8 February 1948
- Competitors: 22 (17 men and 5 women) in 5 sports
- Flag bearer: András Harangvölgyi (cross-country)
- Medals Ranked 11th: Gold 0 Silver 1 Bronze 0 Total 1

Winter Olympics appearances (overview)
- 1924; 1928; 1932; 1936; 1948; 1952; 1956; 1960; 1964; 1968; 1972; 1976; 1980; 1984; 1988; 1992; 1994; 1998; 2002; 2006; 2010; 2014; 2018; 2022; 2026

Hungary competed at the 1948 Winter Olympics in St. Moritz, Switzerland.

== Medalists ==
Medal	Name	Sport	Event
Silver	Andrea Kékesy; Ede Király	Figure skating	Pairs

== Alpine skiing ==
Men

Athlete	Event	Race 1		Race 2		Total	
Athlete	Event	Time	Rank	Time	Rank	Time	Rank
Lajos Máté	Downhill					4:09.0	84
György Libik	Downhill					3:55.3	77
Károly Kővári	Downhill					3:49.1	65
Tamás Székely	Downhill					3:36.0	52
Sándor Mazány	Downhill					3:31.4	49
Péter Szikla	Downhill					3:30.4	48
György Libik	Slalom	DSQ	–	–	–	DSQ	–
Lajos Máté	Slalom	1:40.1	50	1:20.5	42	3:00.6	48
Tamás Székely	Slalom	1:26.9 (+0:05)	35	1:15.8	34	2:42.7	35
Péter Szikla	Slalom	1:15.1	22	1:14.1	32	2:29.2	25

Men's combined

The downhill part of this event was held along with the main medal event of downhill skiing. For athletes competing in both events, the same time was used (see table above for the results). The slalom part of the event was held separate from the main medal event of slalom skiing (included in table below).

Athlete	Slalom			Total (downhill + slalom)	
Athlete	Time 1	Time 2	Rank	Points	Rank
Lajos Máté	2:19.3	1:46.2	66	89.62	66
Károly Kővári	1:32.5	1:24.2	40	48.35	46
Tamás Székely	1:28.4	1:20.9	35	37.79	35
Péter Szikla	1:24.1	1:12.1	20	29.14	30

Women

Athlete	Event	Race 1		Race 2		Total	
Athlete	Event	Time	Rank	Time	Rank	Time	Rank
Anikó Iglói	Downhill					3:07.1	36
Anikó Iglói	Slalom	1:30.2	24	1:18.7	20	2:48.9	22

Women's combined

The downhill part of this event was held along with the main medal event of downhill skiing. For athletes competing in both events, the same time was used (see table above for the results). The slalom part of the event was held separate from the main medal event of slalom skiing (included in table below).

Athlete	Slalom			Total (downhill + slalom)	
Athlete	Time 1	Time 2	Rank	Points	Rank
Anikó Iglói	DNF	–	–	DNF	–

== Cross-country skiing ==
Men

Event	Athlete	Race	
Event	Athlete	Time	Rank
18 km	Imre Beták	1'29:24	57
18 km	András Harangvölgyi	1'28:10	49

== Figure skating ==
Men

Athlete	CF	FS	Points	Places	Final rank
Ede Király	5	5	174.400	42	5

Women

Athlete	CF	FS	Points	Places	Final rank
Éva Lindner	22	17	134.188	192	21
Marika Saáry	17	14	140.944	142	17

Pairs

Athletes	Points	Places	Final rank
Marianna Nagy; László Nagy	9.909	89	7
Andrea Kékesy; Ede Király	11.109	26	2nd place, silver medalist(s)

== Ski jumping ==
Athlete	Event	Distance 1	Distance 2	Total points	Rank
Pál ványa	Normal hill	DNF	–	DNF	–
Ferenc Hemrik	Normal hill	53.0	61.0	183.3	34

== Speed skating ==
Men

Event	Athlete	Race	
Event	Athlete	Time	Rank
500 m	Iván Ruttkay	47.4	37
500 m	Ákos Elekfy	46.8	34
500 m	Kornél Pajor	45.7	21
500 m	Janós Kilián	44.8	14
1500 m	Gedeon Ladányi	2:31.3	39
1500 m	Janós Kilián	2:22.5	15
1500 m	Kornél Pajor	2:22.2	14
1500 m	Iván Ruttkay	2:21.2	10
5000 m	Gedeon Ladányi	9:30.2	35
5000 m	Ákos Elekfy	9:18.6	29
5000 m	Iván Ruttkay	8:46.9	13
5000 m	Kornél Pajor	8:45.2	10
10,000 m	Janós Kilián	20:23.8	16
10,000 m	Iván Ruttkay	20:16.5	15
10,000 m	Kornél Pajor	17:45.6	4
