= Choi Yong-jin =

Choi Yong-jin may refer to:

- Choi Yong-jin (athlete)
- Choi Yong-jin (speed skater)
