= Earl Bartholome =

American ice hockey player

Earl Franklin Bartholome (June 21, 1914 – January 27, 2002), born as Earl Bartholomew, was an American ice hockey player.

Bartholome was born in Valley City, North Dakota. His parents were William "Bill" N. Bartholomew and Clara U. Bartholomew. Bill and Clara had five children: Earl, Vern, Ken, Ardys, and Carl. Bill was the head timer at local, state, and national speed skating events for about 35 years and a member of the timing committees at the US Olympic speed skating trials in the 1950s.

In 1932, Bartholome married Lauretta Rice. They had three children together: Judy Earlette, Diane, and Terry Earl.

Bartholome played in the United States Hockey League with the Minneapolis Millers, as well as the Rochester Cardinals and the Cleveland Barons of the American Hockey League. He was inducted into the United States Hockey Hall of Fame in 1977. Bartholome died in St. Louis Park, Minnesota in 2002 at the age of 88.

Bartholome's surname originally was Bartholomew, but he dropped the "w" in order to avoid confusion with his younger brother Ken Bartholomew.
