= 1905 World Allround Speed Skating Championships =

International speed skating competition

World Allround Speed Skating Championships
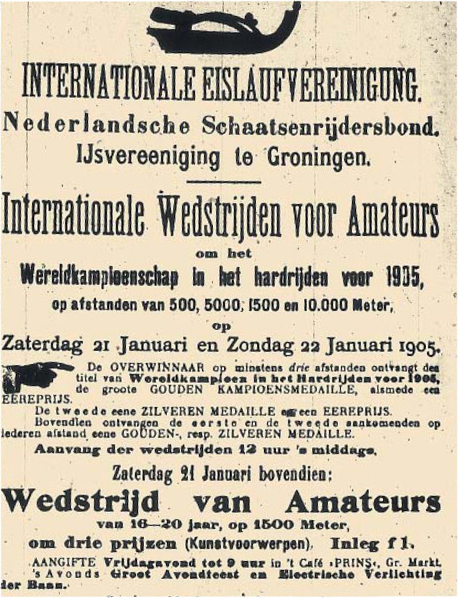
- Poster 1905
- Venue: Stadspark, Groningen, Netherlands
- Dates: 21–22 January
- Competitors: 4 from 2 nations

Medalist men
1st place, gold medalist(s)		Coen de Koning	NED

The 1905 World Allround Speed Skating Championships took place at 21 and 22 January 1905 at the ice rink Stadspark in Groningen, Netherlands.

Sigurd Mathisen was defending champion. He did not participate and did not defend his title.

Coen de Koning won three of the four distances and became World champion.

== Allround results ==
Place	Athlete	Country	500m	5000m	1500m	10000m
1st place, gold medalist(s)	Coen de Koning	Netherlands	51.6 (2)	9:17.6 (1)	2:41.0 (1)	19:16.0 (1)
NC2	Martinus Lørdahl	Norway	49.8 (1)	9:57.0 (2)	2:46.4 (2)	21:07.0 (2)
NC	Sietse van de Waard	Netherlands	57.6 (3)	11:20.4 (3)	3:04.4 (3)
NC	G. Bernard	Netherlands	NF	11:45.2 (4)

* = Fell
NC = Not classified
NF = Not finished
NS = Not started
DQ = Disqualified

Source: SpeedSkatingStats.com

== Rules ==
Four distances have to be skated:

- 500m
- 1500m
- 5000m
- 10000m

One could only win the World Championships by winning at least three of the four distances, so there would be no World Champion if no skater won at least three distances.

Silver and bronze medals were not awarded.
