= Hanspeter Vogt =

Swiss speed skater (1927–2012

Personal information
- Nationality: Swiss
- Born: 22 May 1927 Basel, Switzerland
- Died: 3 March 2012 (aged 84) Basel, Switzerland

Sport
- Sport: Speed skating

Hanspeter Vogt (22 May 1927 – 3 March 2012) was a Swiss speed skater. He competed in the men's 1500 metres event at the 1948 Winter Olympics.
