= Halle Janemar =

Swedish speed skater

Harald "Halle" Janemar (May 4, 1920 – February 14, 2016) was a Swedish speed skater who competed in the 1948 Winter Olympics. He finished eleventh in the 500 metres competition.
