= Art Seaman =

American speed skater

Personal information
- Born: March 14, 1923 Minneapolis, Minnesota, United States
- Died: February 9, 2008 (aged 84) Minneapolis, Minnesota, United States

Sport
- Sport: Speed skating

Art Seaman (January 17, 1923 – September 10, 2007) was an American speed skater. He competed in the men's 10,000 metres event at the 1948 Winter Olympics.
