= Mats Bolmstedt =

Swedish speed skater

Mats Bolmstedt (July 8, 1920 – December 9, 1965) was a Swedish speed skater who competed in the 1948 Winter Olympics and in the 1952 Winter Olympics.

In 1948 he finished tenth in the 500 metres competition and 17th in the 1500 metres event.
