= Fernando Alloni =

Italian speed skater

Personal information
- Nationality: Italian
- Born: 11 May 1925 Milan, Italy
- Died: 29 January 2015 (aged 89)

Sport
- Sport: Speed skating

Fernando Alloni (11 May 1925 – 29 January 2015) was an Italian speed skater. He competed in the men's 5000 metres event at the 1948 Winter Olympics.
