= Alfred Altenburger =

Swiss speed skater (1923–2008)

Personal information
- Nationality: Swiss
- Born: 14 March 1923
- Died: 9 February 2008 (aged 84); Geneva, Switzerland

Sport
- Sport: Speed skating

Alfred Altenburger (14 March 1923 – 9 February 2008) was a Swiss speed skater. He competed in the men's 5000 metres event at the 1948 Winter Olympics.
