= Heinz Hügelshofer =

Swiss speed skater (1919–1994)

Personal information
- Nationality: Swiss
- Born: 25 March 1919; St. Gallen, Switzerland
- Died: 10 August 1994 (aged 75); Zürich, Switzerland

Sport
- Sport: Speed skating

Heinz Hügelshofer (25 March 1919 – 10 August 1994) was a Swiss speed skater. He competed in the men's 5000 metres event at the 1948 Winter Olympics.
