= Ken Bartholomew =

American speed skater

Olympic medal record

Representing United States

Men's speed skating
Silver medal – second place	1948 St. Moritz	500 m

Kenneth Eldred Bartholomew (February 10, 1920 – October 9, 2012) was a speed skating champion from the United States.

Bartholomew was born in Leonard, North Dakota. His parents were William N. Bartholomew and Clara U. Bartholomew. Bill and Clara had five children: Earl, Vern, Ken, Ardys, and Carl. Bill was the head timer at local, state, and national speed skating events for about 35 years and a member of the timing committees at the US Olympic speed skating trials in the 1950s.

Living in Minnesota, Bartholomew skated mostly at local, statewide, and national events, winning more than 1,000 medals and trophies. Among these were fourteen National Championships titles between 1945 and 1960, three North American outdoor titles, and one North American indoor title. In 1948, Bartholomew competed in the 500 m at the Winter Olympics of St. Moritz and finished second behind Finn Helgesen. He shared his second place with fellow United States team member Bob Fitzgerald and Norwegian skater Thomas Byberg.

Bartholomew worked for Northwestern Bell, laying and repairing telephone lines. He also owned a tree service. In his later years, he competed in ski jumping and golf.

Bartholomew and his wife Evelyn had five daughters. He was inducted in the Minnesota Sports Hall of Fame in 1959 and in the National Speedskating Hall of Fame in 1968. At the 1974 Senior Olympics in Lake Placid, New York, Bartholomew won gold medals in the 200 m, the 500 m, the 1,000 m, and the 1,500 m.

His brothers Earl and Carl also were renowned in sports: Earl Bartholome – he dropped the final "w" from his surname in order to avoid confusion with Ken – was a professional ice hockey player, inducted in the United States Hockey Hall of Fame in 1977, while Carl once held the world record for non-stop speed skating with a time of 54½ hours.
