= Harry Jansson =

Swedish speed skater

Harry Jansson, 1948

Gustav Harry Jansson (also known as Harry Jangneus, June 4, 1916 – March 11, 2002) was a Swedish speed skater who competed in the 1948 Winter Olympics.

In 1948 he finished fourth in the 5000 metres competition, fifth in the 1500 metres event, and eighth in the 10000 metres competition.
