= Coen de Koning =

Dutch speed skater and cyclist

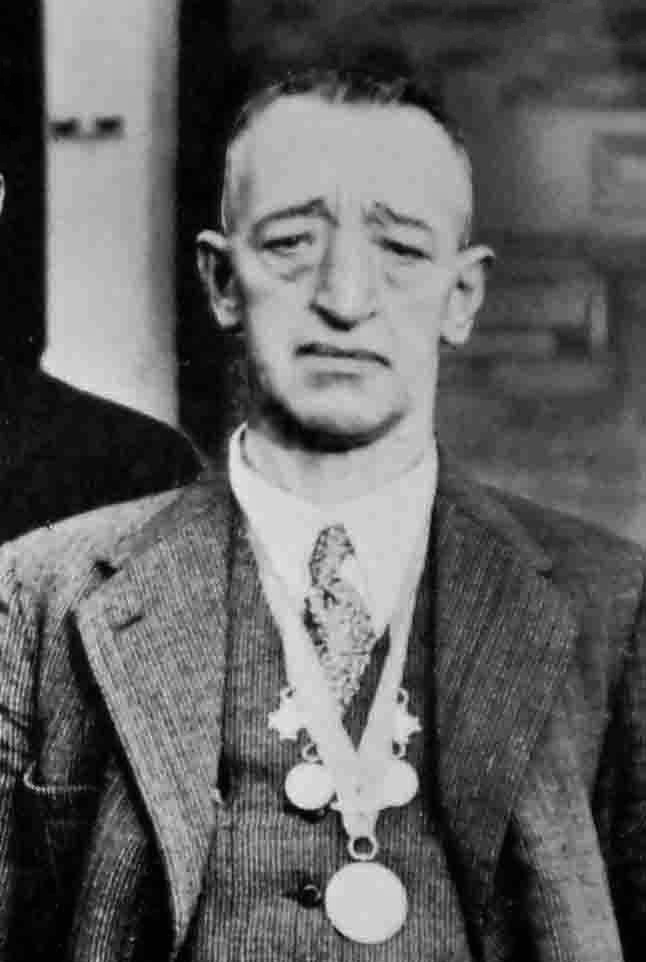
- De Koning in 1934

Personal information
- Born: 30 March 1879 Edam, the Netherlands
- Died: 29 July 1954 (aged 75) Breda, the Netherlands

Sport
- Country: Netherlands
- Sport: Speed skating

Achievements and titles
- Personal best(s): 1912 Elfstedentocht; 1917 Elfstedentocht
Medal record
Men's speed skating
Representing the Netherlands
World Allround Championships
Gold medal – first place	1905 Groningen	Allround
European Championships
Silver medal – second place	1904 Davos	Allround
Bronze medal – third place	1906 Davos	Allround
Dutch Allround championships
Gold medal – first place	1903 Groningen	Allround
Gold medal – first place	1905 Deventer	Allround
Gold medal – first place	1912 Leeuwarden	Allround

Coen de Koning (30 March 1879 – 29 July 1954) was a speed skater and cyclist. He started his sports career as a cyclist, but switched to speed skating and became the second Dutch speed skater to win a world title, in 1905. He finished second in 500 m, and won the 1500, 5000 and 10,000 m events. De Koning won the national all-around title in 1903, 1905 and 1912, and set national records in the 500 m and 10,000 m in 1905; these records stood until 1926 and 1929. De Koning also set a world record in one-hour skating, at 32,370 m in 1906, and won the Elfstedentocht in 1912 and 1917.

== Family ==
De Koning came from a speed skating family. His brother Jacobus "Sjaak" Petrus de Koning won the national all-around title in 1914. His son Jacobus Petrus Coenradus de Koning (born 1907) competed at the 1942 national championships, and his cousin Aad de Koning took part in the 1948 Winter Olympics. His more distant relatives on the brother's side, Truus Dijkstra and Jacques de Koning were also prominent Dutch speed skaters.

Jacobus de Koning; 1850 - 1936	Catharina Maria Elisabeth Turkenburg; 1858 - 1929
Coenradus Cornelis Josephus de Koning; 1879 - 1954	Petronella Boot; 1858 - 1930	Jacobus Petrus de Koning; 1885 - 1962	Maria van Schaik; 1882 - 1929
Jacobus Petrus Coenradus de Koning; 1907	Jacobus de Koning; 1921	onbekend	Adrianus Jacobus Petrus de Koning; 1928 - 2010	Paulien
Jacques de Koning; 1950	Geertruida Catharina Dijkstra; 1951
Jacques de Koning; 1981	Esther

Year	Date	Temperature	Winner (*)		Time	Distance	Average speed
1909	2 January	n/a	Minne Hoekstra		13:50	189 km	13.7 km/h
1912	7 February	3.8°C	Coen de Koning		11:40	189 km	16.2 km/h
1917	27 January	-1.8°C	Coen de Koning		9:53	189 km	19.1 km/h
1929	12 February	-10.1°C	Karst Leemburg		11:09	191 km	17.1 km/h
1933	16 December	-2.0°C	Abe de Vries; Sipke Castelein		9:53	195 km	19.7 km/h
1940	30 January	-6.1°C	Piet Keijzer; Auke Adema; Cor Jongert; Durk van der Duim; Sjouke Westra		11:34	198.5 km	17.3 km/h
1941	7 February	0.0°C	Auke Adema		9:19	198.5 km	21.3 km/h
1942	22 January	-11.7°C	Sietze de Groot		8:44	198 km	22.7 km/h
1947	8 February	-8.5°C	Jan W. van der Hoorn		10:51	191 km	17.6 km/h
1954	3 February	-5.4°C	Jeen van den Berg		7:35	198.5 km	26.2 km/h
1956	14 February	-4.9°C	no winner declared (**)		—	190.5 km	—
1963	18 January	-7.7°C	Reinier Paping		10:59	196.5 km	17.9 km/h
			Winner men	Winner women (*)			
1985	21 February	0.3°C	Evert van Benthem	Lenie van der Hoorn	6:47	196.8 km	29.0 km/h
1986	26 February	-6.9°C	Evert van Benthem	Tineke Dijkshoorn	6:55	199.3 km	28.8 km/h
1997	4 January	-3.6°C	Henk Angenent	Klasina Seinstra	6:49	199.6 km	29.3 km/h
"History" (in Dutch). Vereniging De Friesche Elf Steden [Association of the Eleven Fries Cities].; * Women were first allowed to take part in the tour proper in 1985; before then they had to skate with the amateurs and no award was given. ** After shared wins in 1933 and 1940, when the front-runners decided not to compete but join hands to cross the line together, this practice was forbidden by the organisation. Jan van der Hoorn, Aad de Koning, Jeen Nauta, Maus Wijnhout and Anton Verhoeven however ignored this rule when they crossed the finish line in unison. They were not disqualified, but no winner was declared.: "3,000 Skaters in 124-mile race". The Times. No. 48527. London. 31 January 1940. col. B, p. 7.
