= Keijo Lehdikkö =

Finnish speed skater

Personal information
- Nationality: Finnish
- Born: 4 June 1920; Helsinki, Finland
- Died: 20 February 1958 (aged 37); Tampere, Finland

Sport
- Sport: Speed skating

Keijo Lehdikkö (4 June 1920 – 20 February 1958) was a Finnish speed skater. He competed in the men's 500 metres event at the 1948 Winter Olympics.
