= Rune Hammarström =

Swedish speed skater

Rune Hammarström (November 16, 1920 – May 3, 1999) was a Swedish speed skater who competed in the 1948 Winter Olympics.

In 1948 he finished ninth in the 10000 metres competition and 16th in the 5000 metres event.
