= Anton Huiskes =

Dutch speed skater

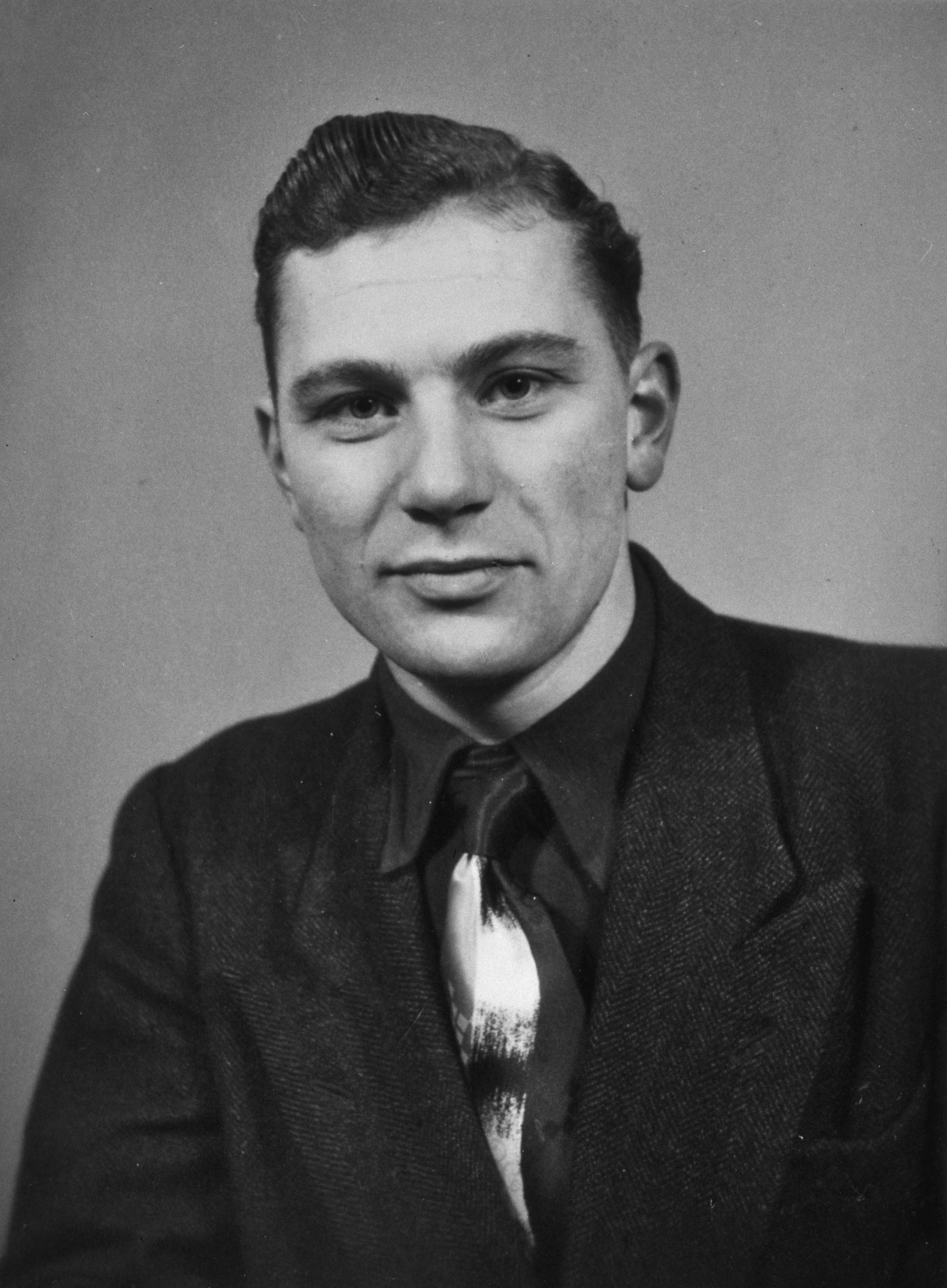
- Anton Huiskes in 1952

Personal information
- Born: 5 March 1928 Andijk, Netherlands
- Height: 9 November 2008 (aged 80)

Sport
- Country: Netherlands
- Sport: Speed skating

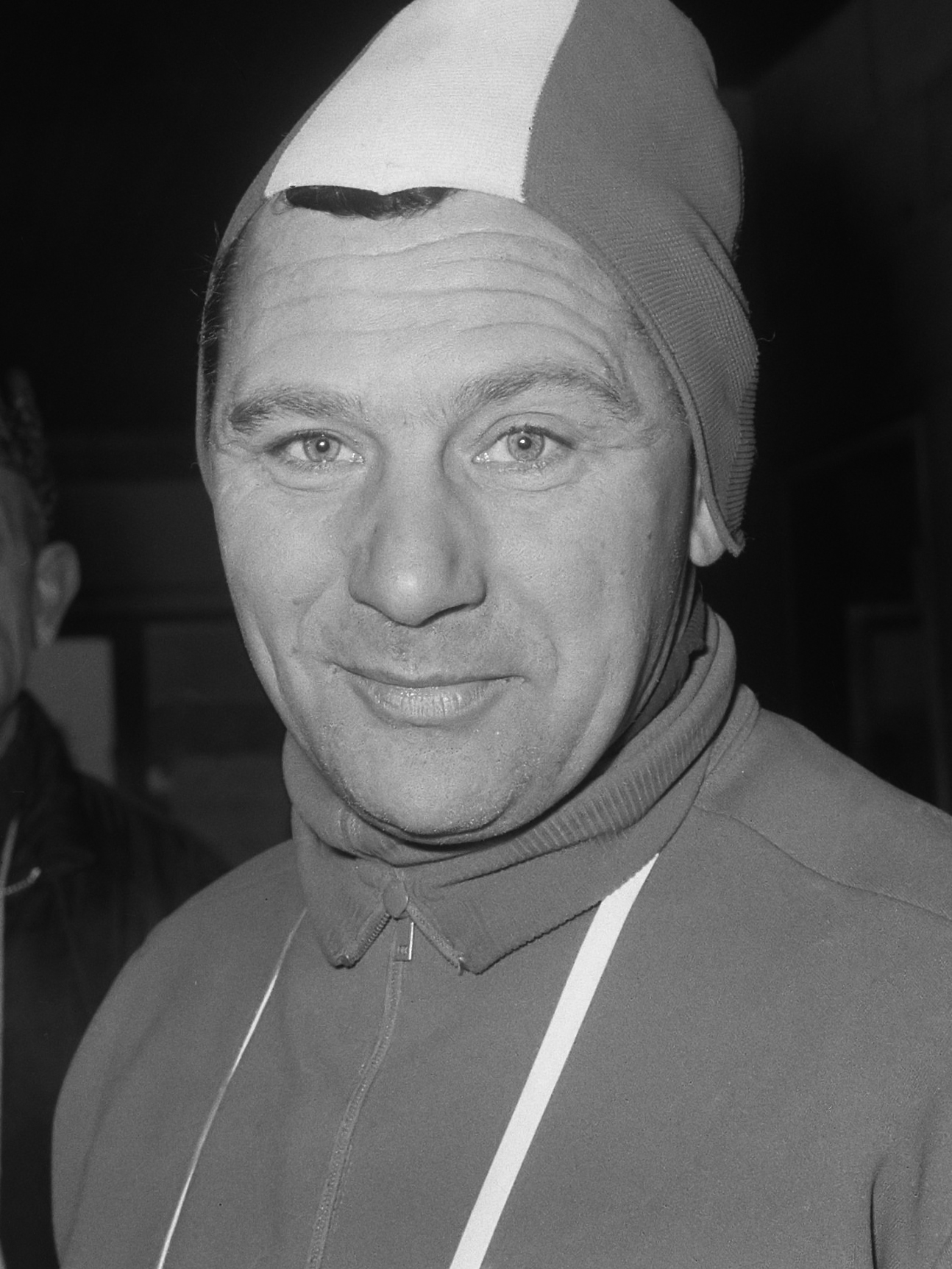
Anton Huiskes in 1966

Antonius "Anton" Albertus Jozef Huiskes (5 March 1928 – 9 November 2008) was a Dutch speed skater who competed at the 1948 and 1952 Winter Olympics. He was born in Wierden, Overijssel and died in Coux-et-Bigaroque, France. In 1948 he finished 27th in the 500 m, 13th in the 10000 m, 24th in the 1500 m, 12th in the 5000 m and 13th in the 10000 m event. Four years later he was fourth in the 5000 m and fifth in the 10000 m competition.

In 1953 Huiskes won distance medals at the World and European Championships and set a new world record in the 3000 m, which stood for 10 years. He then retired from competition and became a successful coach, leading Ard Schenk and Kees Verkerk to European and world titles in the mid 1960s. Huiskes was dismissed by the Dutch skating federation due to his attempts to commercialize skating, but he was hired by the Swedish team, and prepared Johnny Höglin to an Olympic gold medal in 1968. In 1972, Huiskes returned to train Schenk and Verkerk and later founded the Anton Huiskes Foundation that promoted speed skating among disabled children.

== World record ==
Discipline	Time	Date	Location
3000 m	4.40,2	24 January 1953	Davos

Source: SpeedSkatingStats.com

Records
Preceded by (Sweden) Åke Seyffarth	Men's 3000 m World Record Holder; 24 January 1953 – 12 January 1963	Succeeded by (Norway) Knut Johannesen
