= Delbert Lamb =

American speed skater

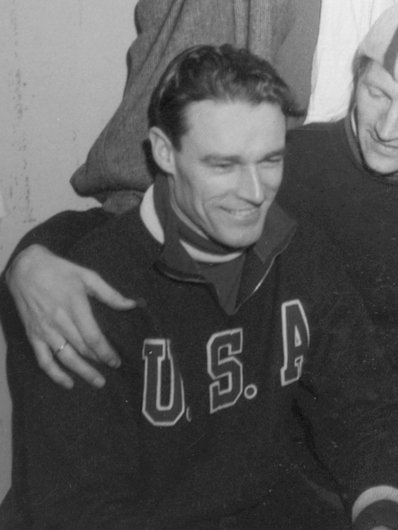
- Lamb in Norway in 1950

Personal information
- Born: October 22, 1914 Milwaukee, Wisconsin, United States
- Died: September 25, 2010 (aged 95) Franklin, Milwaukee County, Wisconsin, U.S.

Sport
- Sport: Speed skating
- Club: Wisconsin Skating Association

Achievements and titles
- Personal bests: 500 m – 42.6 (1936); 1500 m – 2:25.5 (1948); 5000 m – 8:54.5 (1936)

Delbert Thomas "Del" Lamb (October 22, 1914 – September 25, 2010) was an American speed skater. He competed in the 500 m event at the 1936 and 1948 Olympics and placed fifth-sixth. He won that event at the 1936 World Championships, placing second in 1950.

Lamb worked for the Milwaukee Fire Department, and lost his job when he left for the U.S. Olympic Trials and the 1948 Olympics amidst a big snowstorm in Milwaukee. Between 1948 and 1958 he served as sheriff of Milwaukee, and also ran Del Lamb's Sport and Cycle Shop there. After retiring from competitions he worked as a speed skating coach and attended the 1956 Winter Olympics in this capacity. At the next Olympics in Squaw Valley he served as Chief Starter for speed skating events. In 1969 he was inducted into the U.S. Speed Skating Hall of Fame.

Lamb died aged 95 from the Alzheimer's disease at his home in Franklin, Milwaukee County, Wisconsin. He was survived by his wife of 43 years Joanne, sons Pat and Thomas, daughter Susan and step-children Kathleen Ojedak and James Gray. His other daughter Judith died before him.
