= Ivar Johansen (bobsledder) =

Norwegian bobsledder

Ivar Johansen (16 December 1910 – 23 April 1984) was a Norwegian bobsledder who competed in the late 1940s. At the 1948 Winter Olympics in St. Moritz, he finished fifth in the four-man and seventh in the two-man events.
