= Gunnar Konsmo =

Norwegian speed skater

Gunnar Konsmo (13 June 1922 – 10 April 1996) was a Norwegian speed skater who competed in the 1948 Winter Olympics. In 1948 he finished tenth in the 1500 metres competition.
