= Thomas Byberg =

Norwegian speed skater

Medal record

Representing Norway

Men's speed skating

Olympic Games
Silver medal – second place	1948 St.Moritz	500 m

Thomas Hedvin Byberg (18 September 1916 – 13 October 1998) born in Hommelvik was a Norwegian speed skater. He represented Hommelvik Idrettslag and Trondhjems Skøiteklub.

At the 1948 Winter Olympics in St. Moritz, Byberg won a silver medal on 500 m. The time 43.2 was one tenth of a second behind his fellow Norwegian team member Finn Helgesen. The silver medal was shared with two Americans, Ken Bartholomew and Bob Fitzgerald.

== Personal records ==
43.2 - 1:34.0 - 2:23.7 - 5:12.9 - 8:51.9 - 18:49.1
