= Arne Holst =

Norwegian bobsledder

Arne Holst (March 16, 1904 – December 27, 1991) was a Norwegian bobsledder who competed from the late 1940s to the early 1950s. Competing in two Winter Olympics, he earned his best finish of fifth in the four-man event at St. Moritz in 1948.
