= Göthe Hedlund =

Swedish speed skater

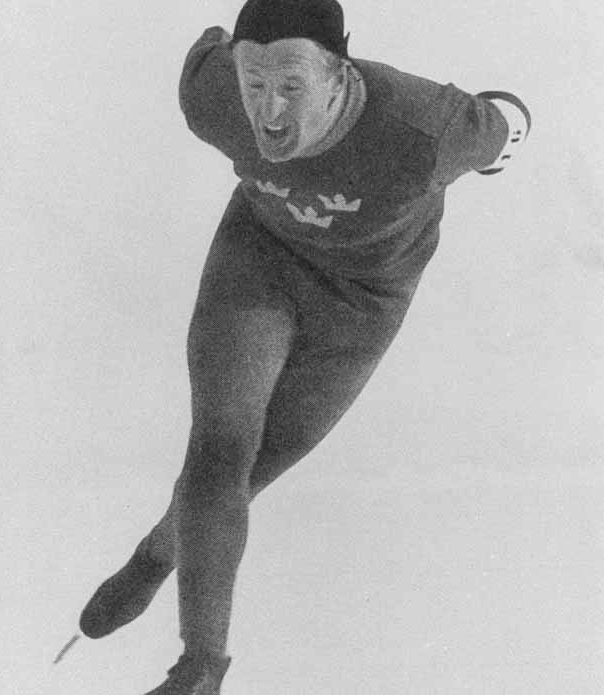
- Hedlund at the 1948 Olympics

Personal information
- Full name: Göthe Emanuel Hedlund
- Born: 31 July 1918 Orkesta, Sweden
- Died: 15 December 2003 (aged 85) Lidingö, Stockholm, Sweden

Sport
- Sport: Speed skating
- Club: Brunnsvikens SK, Stockholm
Medal record
Representing Sweden
Olympic Games
| Bronze medal – third place | 1948 St. Moritz | 5,000 m |
European Championships
| Gold medal – first place | 1946 Trondheim | All-around |
| Silver medal – second place | 1947 Stockholm | All-around |
| Silver medal – second place | 1948 Hamar | All-around |

Göthe Emanuel Hedlund (31 July 1918 – 15 December 2003) was a Swedish speed skater who was at the world top around World War II.

Hedlund made his international debut at the 1939 European Allround Championships of Riga, Latvia, finishing 16th. Two weeks later, he participated in the World Allround Championships held in Helsinki, but his times on the first three distances were not good enough to qualify him for the final distance. The start of World War II meant that only very few tournaments were organised, so Hedlund could not compete very often during those years.

When the war was over, Hedlund participated in the first European Allround Championships after the war and promptly became the 1946 European Allround Champion. There were no official World Allround Championships that year, but unofficial World Championships were held in Oslo and Hedlund won silver there. In 1947, Hedlund won European silver behind compatriot Åke Seyffarth. At the 1948 Winter Olympics of St. Moritz, Hedlund won bronze on the 5,000 m behind Norwegian skaters Reidar Liaklev and Odd Lundberg. His last international medal came two weeks later at the European Allround Championships where he won silver, again behind Liaklev.

Hedlund competed internationally until 1952, when he finished in 9th–11th places in the 5,000–10,000 m events at the Winter Olympics. He died in Lidingö in 2003 at the age of 85. His daughter Ylva also became an Olympic speed skater.

== National titles ==
Hedlund won 12 Swedish National titles:

- 1,500 m: 1947 and 1949.
- 3,000 m: 1947 and 1949.
- 5,000 m: 1939, 1947, and 1949.
- 10,000 m: 1939, 1944, 1945, 1949, and 1950.

Note that Sweden did not have any National Allround Championships from 1935 to 1962 – only National Single Distance Championships.

== Personal records ==
To put these personal records in perspective, the WR column lists the official world records on the dates that Hedlund skated his personal records.

| Event | Result | Date | Venue | WR |
|---|---|---|---|---|
| 500 m | 44.5 | 10 February 1951 | Davos | 41.8 |
| 1,000 m | 1:31.2 | 2 February 1941 | Davos | 1:28.4 |
| 1,500 m | 2:18.4 | 29 January 1948 | St. Moritz | 2:13.8 |
| 3,000 m | 4:52.0 | 31 January 1942 | Davos | 4:49.6 |
| 5,000 m | 8:18.7 | 20 January 1951 | Oslo | 8:07.3 |
| 10,000 m | 17:23.9 | 6 February 1949 | Davos | 17:01.5 |

Hedlund has an Adelskalender score of 192.698 points.
