= András Harangvölgyi =

Hungarian cross-country skier (1920–2010)

Personal information
- Nationality: Hungarian
- Born: 27 December 1920; Budapest, Hungary
- Died: 17 September 2010 (aged 89); Budapest, Hungary

Sport
- Sport: Cross-country skiing

András Harangvölgyi (27 December 1920 – 17 September 2010) was a Hungarian cross-country skier. He competed in the men's 18 kilometre event at the 1948 Winter Olympics.
