= György Libik =

Hungarian alpine skier (1919–1995)

Personal information
- Nationality: Hungarian
- Born: 18 October 1919; Rózsahegy, Hungary
- Died: 23 January 1995 (aged 75); Budapest, Hungary

Sport
- Sport: Alpine skiing

György Libik (18 October 1919 – 23 January 1995) was a Hungarian alpine skier. He competed in two events at the 1948 Winter Olympics.
