= Iván Ruttkay =

Hungarian speed skater and actor (1926–2013)

- Born: Iván Russ; February 3, 1926; Budapest, Hungary
- Died: June 30, 2013 (aged 87); Stockholm, Sweden
- Other names: Iván Ruttkai
- Occupation: Actor
- Years active: 1937 - 1971
- Known for: Olympic speed skater
- Family: Éva Ruttkai (sister)

Iván Ruttkay (3 February 1926 – 30 June 2013), sometimes spelled Iván Ruttkai, was a Hungarian film and stage actor and competitive speed skater. He represented Hungary in the 1948 Winter Olympics. His siblings were the actress Éva Ruttkai and the actor Ottó Ruttkai.

== Early life ==
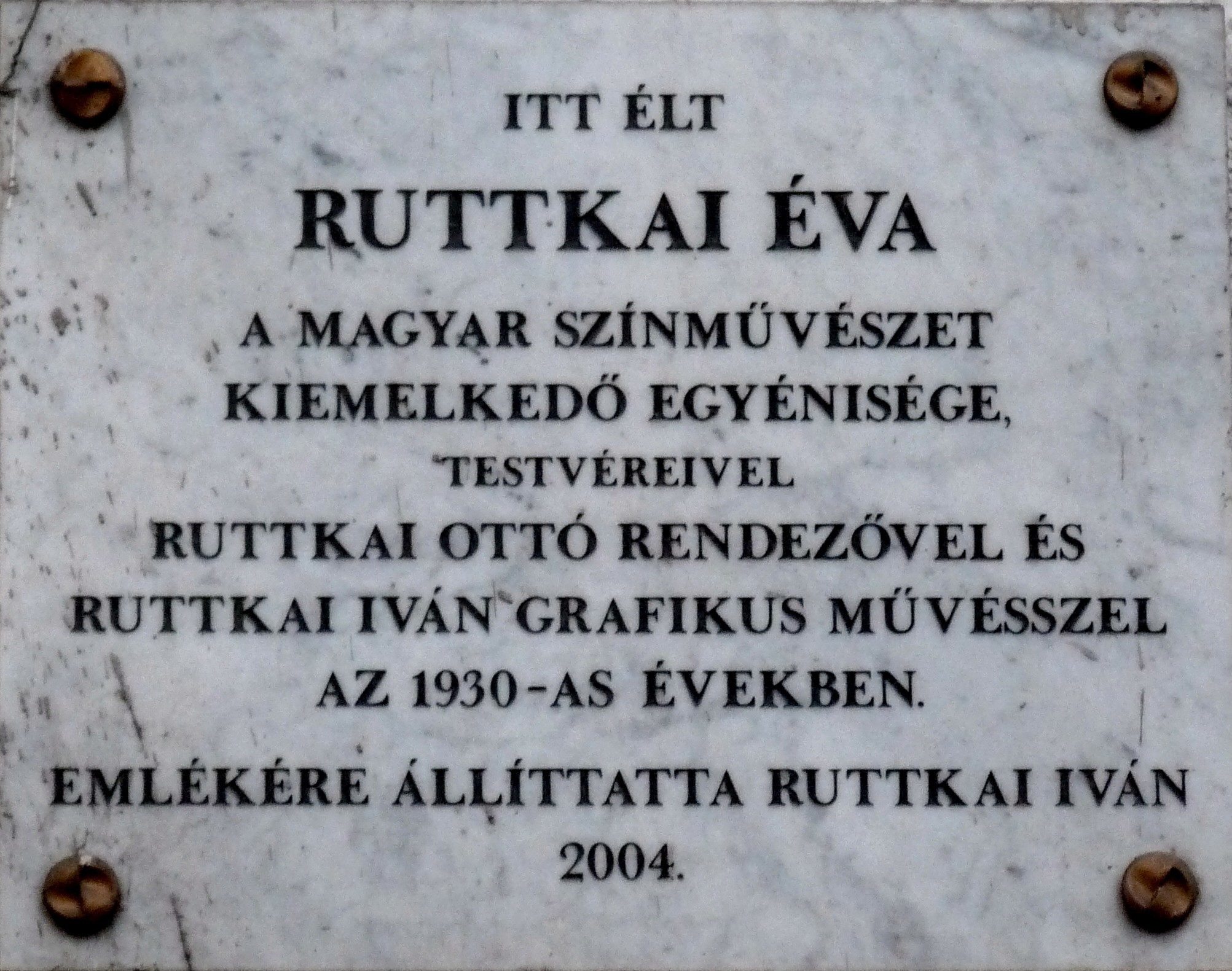
Commemorative plaque for Éva Ruttkai and her brothers, Ottó Ruttkai and Iván Ruttkai, in Budapest District VII on Erzsébet Boulevard No 27.

Ruttkay was born Iván Russ on 3 February 1926 in Budapest, Hungary. His parents were Emma Podrabsky and Miklós "Márk" Russ. His family was Jewish.

During World War II, Ruttkay was conscripted into the Hungarian Labor Service, unit number 101/322. In addition enduring forced labor, Ruttay also survived the Kiskunhalas massacre, where the Schutzstaffel (Nazi SS) killed 196 of his fellow labor servicemen.

== Speed skating ==
Ruttkay was a competitive speed skating champion. He represented Hungary in numerous events in the 1948 Winter Olympics in St. Moritz, Switzerland. At the Olympics, he finished 10th in the 1500 metres event, 13th in the 5000 metres competition, 15th in the 10000 metres event, and 37th in the 500 metres competition.

== Acting ==
Ruttkay was a film actor and also performed on the stage in Budapest. He started his acting career as a child, learning his craft and performing at Lakner bácsi Gyermekszínházána (Uncle Lakner's Children's Theater) in Budaest. His first film was A titokzatos idegen (The Mysterious Stranger) in 1936, followed by A szív szava {The World of the Heart) and Mámi (Mommy) in 1937. After World War II, Ruttkay returned to acting, with a role as Jani in Rózsafabot (Rosewood) in 1940. This was his best known role.

In 1941, Ruttkay's films included Ma, tegnap, holnap (Yesterday, Today, Tomorrow); Balkezes angyal (The Left-Handed Angel); and Bob herceg (Prince Bob). He had a role in Mese a 12 találatról (The Tale of the 12 Hits) in 1956. Rottkay was cast in the four-part television film, Villa Lidón (The Villa), in 1971.

== Personal life ==
Ruttakay's siblings were the noted Hungarian film and stage actress Éva Ruttkai and the stage actor Ottó Ruttkai (sometimes spelled Ruttakay).

For the last few decades of his life, Ruttakay lived in Sweden. Ruttakay died in Stockholm, Sweden on 30 June 2013 at the age of 87 years.

== Filmography ==
Film	Year	Character	References
A titokzatos idegen [The Mysterious Stranger]	1936	Pista, son of the janitor Márton	
A szív szava [The Word of the Heart]	1937		
Mámi [Mommy]	1937	Józsi	
Rózsafabot [Rosewood]	1940	Jani, István Berek's valet	
Balkezes angyal [The Left-Handed Angel]	1941	Laci, Klári's younger brother	
Ma, tegnap, holnap [Yesterday, Today, Tomorrow]	1941	boy in the hotel	
Bob herceg [Prince Bob]	1941	barber	
Mese a 12 találatról [The Tale of the 12 Hits]	1956		
Villa Lidón [The Villa]	1971	Richard Middleton, American journalist	
