= Gunnar Thoresen (bobsledder) =

Norwegian bobsledder

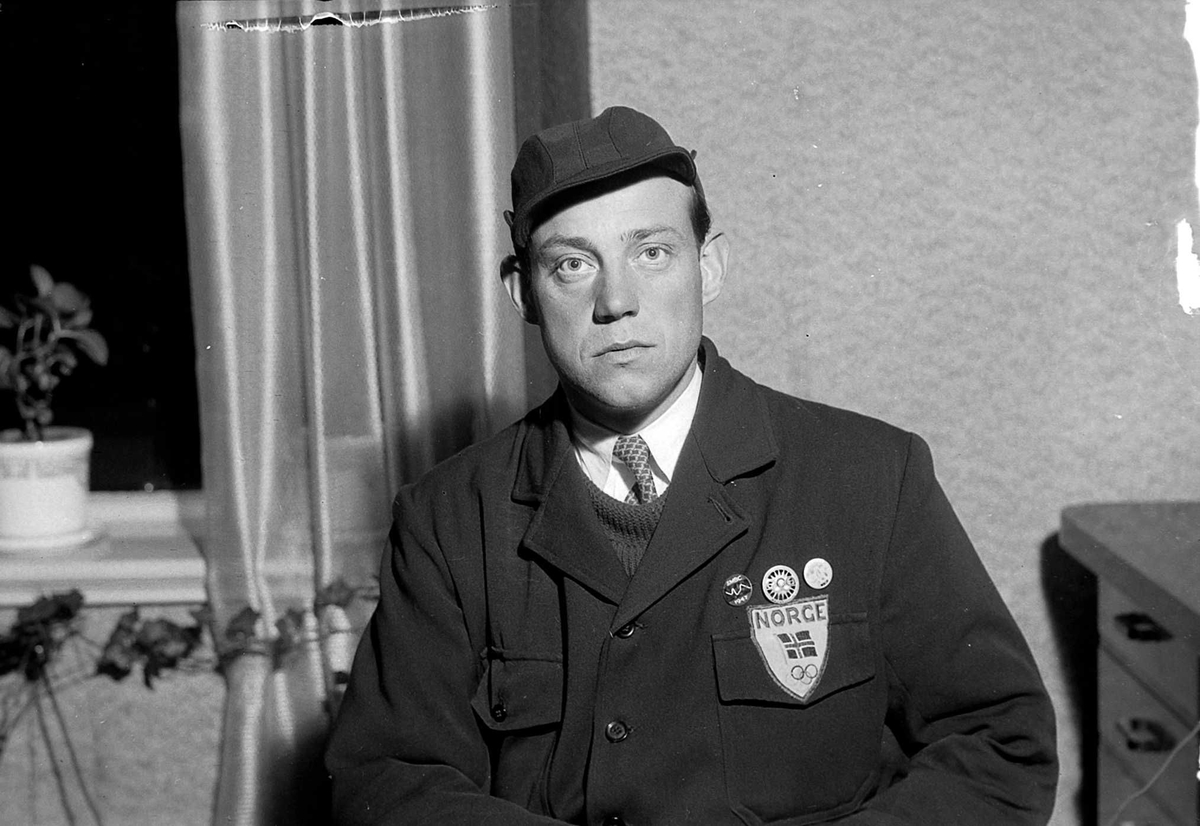
Gunnar Thoresen

Gunnar Thoresen (October 10, 1921 – May 01, 1972) was a Norwegian bobsledder who competed in the late 1940s and early 1950s. Competing in two Winter Olympics, he earned his best finish of tenth in the four-man event at Oslo in 1952.

Gnarly
