= Pentti Lammio =

Finnish speed skater

Personal information
- Nationality: Finnish
- Born: Pentti Johannes Lammio; 24 October 1919 Tampere, Finland
- Died: 25 July 1999 (aged 79) Lempäälä, Finland

Sport
- Country: Finland
- Sport: Speed skating

Achievements and titles
- Personal best(s): 500 m: 46.7 (1939); 1500 m: 2:23.9 (1948); 3000 m: 5:07.6 (1952); 5000 m: 8:17.3 (1952); 10 000 m: 17:01.1 (1952)
Medal record
Men's Speed skating
Bronze medal – third place	1948 St. Moritz	10000 m

Pentti Johannes Lammio (24 October 1919 – 25 July 1999) was a Finnish speed skater who competed in the 1948 Winter Olympics and in the 1952 Winter Olympics.

He was born in Tampere and died in Kulju, Lempäälä.

In 1948 he won the bronze medal in the 10000 metres event. He also finished eighth in the 5000 metres competition and 21st in the 1500 metres event.
