= Torodd Hauer =

Norwegian speed skater

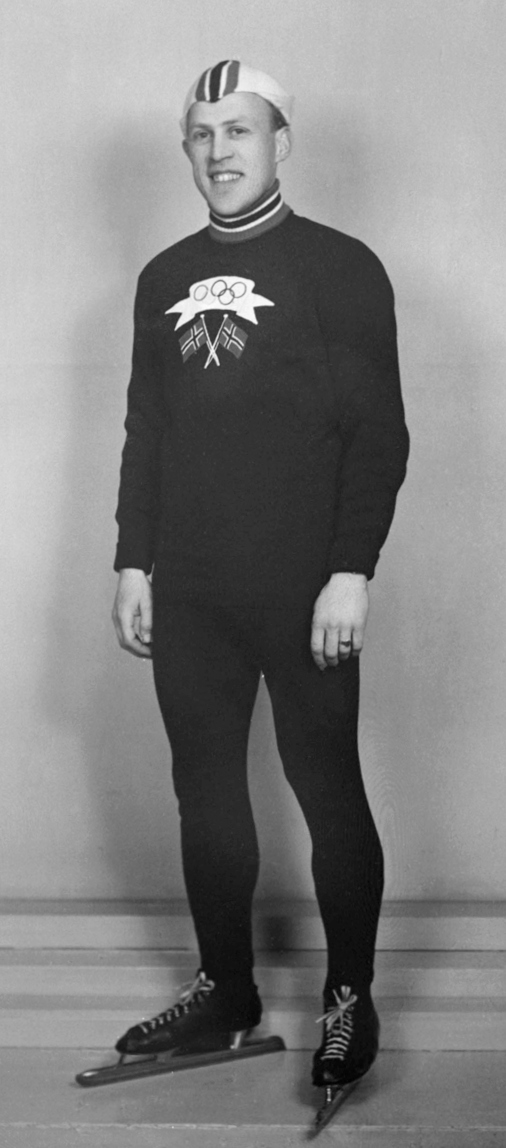
- Hauer in 1952

Personal information
- Born: 8 July 1922 Tingelstad, Norway
- Died: 4 December 2010 (aged 88) Lillehammer, Norway

Sport
- Sport: Speed skating
- Club: Brandbu IF

Achievements and titles
- Personal bests: 500 m – 42.0 (1959); 1500 m – 2:23.0 (1959); 5000 m – 8:54.4 (1961)

Torodd Hilding Hauer (8 July 1922 – 4 December 2010) was a Norwegian speed skater. He competed in the 1948 Winter Olympics and finished sixth in the 500 m event.

Hauer was a sprinter and never placed within the podium at the Norwegian all-round championships. He competed between 1945 and 1962, and continued to improve his personal best times until late thirties. After retiring from skating he owned a successful construction firm in Lillehammer.
