= Robert Fitzgerald (speed skater) =

American speed skater

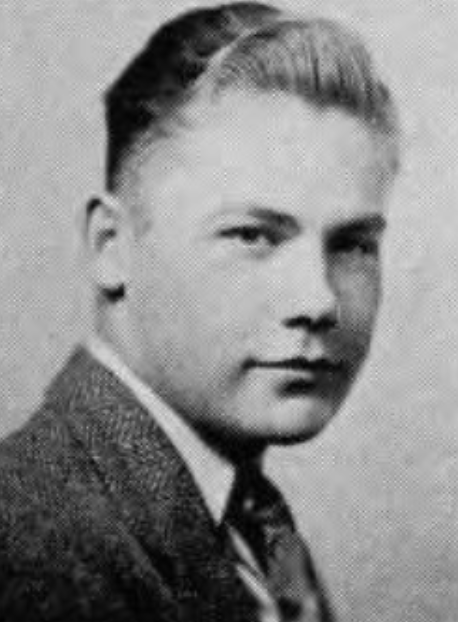
- Fitzgerald in his 1941 high school yearbook

Medal record

Men's speed skating

Representing the United States

Olympic Games
Silver medal – second place	1948 St. Moritz	500 m

Robert Emmett "Bobby" Fitzgerald (October 3, 1923 in Minneapolis, Minnesota – April 22, 2005 in Luverne, Minnesota) was an American speed skater who competed in the 1948 Winter Olympics and in the 1952 Winter Olympics.

He was a member of the US Army Air Corps in World War II, and was discharged due to injuries sustained in a plane crash.

He was a Feb., 1947 graduate of St. Thomas College, when he won the national and North American Speed Skating crowns. Later that year, he skated in the "Winter Carnival" held at Como Park, in St. Paul, which was the US Olympic trials for speed skating. His 1st place there was enough to qualify him for the seven man team. In 1948 he won a silver medal in the 500 metres event. He also finished 28th in the 1500 metres competition.
In 2005, he was inducted to the Minneapolis South High School's (1941 Graduate) "Wall of Honor".

Fitzgerald was also a chiropractor, a 1956 graduate of Northwestern College of Chiropractic, he was also a supporter of the International Chiropractor's Association.
