= Gedeon Ladányi =

Hungarian speed skater (1914–1990)

Personal information
- Nationality: Hungarian
- Born: 5 January 1914; Budapest, Hungary
- Died: 28 August 1990 (aged 76); Budapest, Hungary

Sport
- Sport: Speed skating

Gedeon Ladányi (5 January 1914 – 28 August 1990) was a Hungarian speed skater. He competed in two events at the 1948 Winter Olympics.
