= Ákos Elekfy =

Hungarian speed skater (1923–1977)

Personal information
- Nationality: Hungarian
- Born: 2 April 1923 Budapest, Hungary
- Died: 10 December 1977 (aged 54) Budapest, Hungary

Sport
- Sport: Speed skating

Ákos Elekfy (2 April 1923 – 10 December 1977) was a Hungarian speed skater. He competed in two events at the 1948 Winter Olympics. Elekfy died in Budapest on 10 December 1977, at the age of 54.
