= Choi Yong-jin (speed skater) =

South Korean speed skater

Personal information
- Nationality: South Korean
- Born: 15 October 1922

Sport
- Sport: Speed skating

Choi Yong-jin (born 15 October 1922) was a South Korean speed skater. He competed in two events at the 1948 Winter Olympics.
