= János Kilián =

Hungarian speed skater (1922–2016)

Personal information
- Nationality: Hungarian
- Born: 19 December 1922; Budapest, Hungary
- Died: 26 March 2016 (aged 93); Stockholm, Sweden

Sport
- Sport: Speed skating

János Kilián (19 December 1922 – 26 March 2016) was a Hungarian speed skater. He competed in three events at the 1948 Winter Olympics.
