= Henry Wahl =

Norwegian speed skater

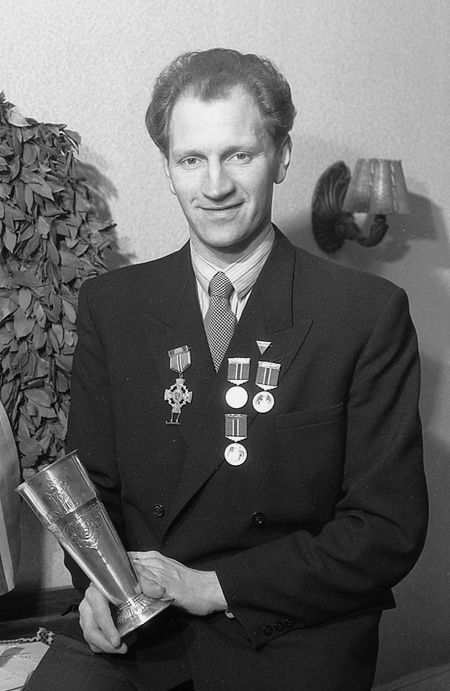
- Wahl in 1947

Personal information
- Born: 9 March 1915 Trondheim, Norway
- Died: 13 October 1984 (aged 69) Trondheim, Norway

Sport
- Sport: Speed skating
- Club: Sportsklubben Falken, Trondheim

Achievements and titles
- Personal best(s): 500 m – 45.2 (1936); 1500 m – 2:21.7 (1951); 5000 m – 8:26.8 (1951); 10,000 m – 17:34.9 (1950)

Henry Wahl (9 March 1915 – 13 October 1984) was a Norwegian speed skater. He competed in the 10,000 m event at the 1948 Winter Olympics, but failed to finish. He was Norwegian all-round champion in 1947.
