= Åke Seyffarth =

Swedish speed skater

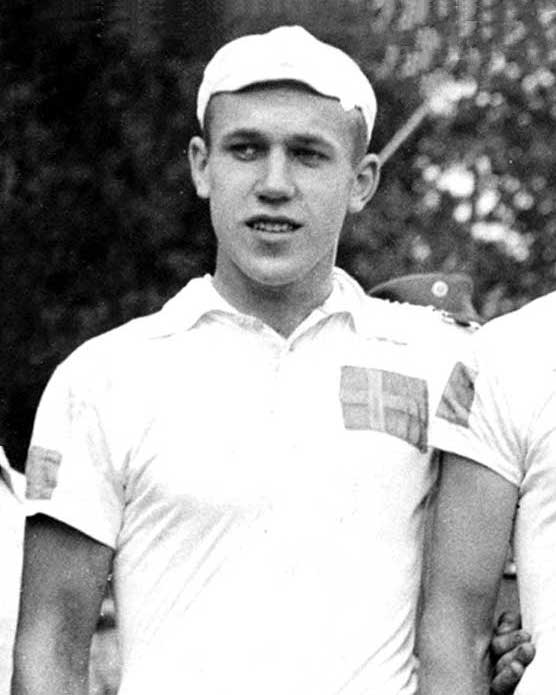
- Åke Seyffarth sometimes before 1940

Personal information
- Full name: Karl Åke Seyffarth
- Nationality: Swedish
- Born: 15 December 1919 Stockholm, Sweden
- Died: 1 January 1998 (aged 78) Mora, Sweden

Sport
- Country: Sweden
- Sport: Speed skating
- Club: IF Linnéa

Achievements and titles
- Personal bests: 500 m: 43.2 (1942); 1000 m: 1:27.5 (1942); 1500 m: 2:14.2 (1941); 3000 m: 4:43.5 (1942); 5000 m: 8:13.7 (1941); 10 000 m: 17:07.5 (1942)
Medal record
Representing Sweden
Olympic Games
Gold medal – first place	1948 St. Moritz	10000 m
Silver medal – second place	1948 St. Moritz	1500 m
World Championships
Bronze medal – third place	1947 Oslo	Allround
European Championships
Gold medal – first place	1947 Stockholm	Allround

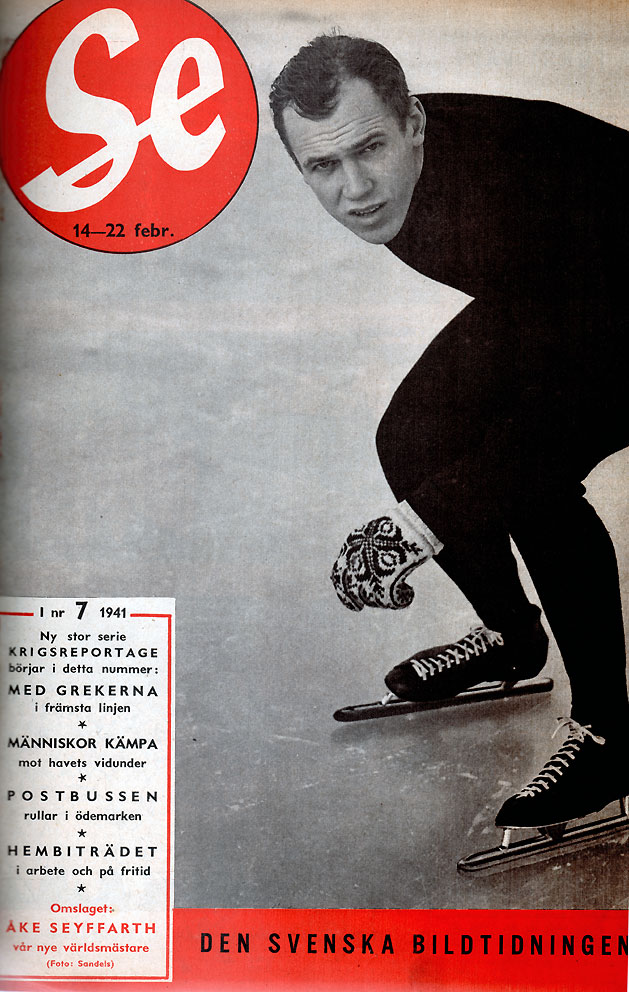
Seyffarth on the cover of a Swedish magazine from 1941

Karl Åke Seyffarth (15 December 1919 – 1 January 1998) was a Swedish speed skater who specialised in long distance events. He set new world records on the 5,000 m (8:13.7) in 1941 and on the 3000 m (4:45.7) in 1942. He became European Allround Champions in 1947, winning both the 5,000 m and the 10000 m on his way to becoming European Champion. In addition to speed skating, Seyffarth also was one of Sweden's leading cyclists, but this career was hampered by an injury in a dirt biking accident in 1943.

Seyffarth participated in the 1948 Winter Olympics in St. Moritz, the first Winter Olympic Games to be held in twelve years. As a result of the lack of competition during, and shortly after, World War II, Seyffarth entered the 5,000 m as the world record holder, a record he had set almost exactly seven years earlier, in 1941. During his heat, Seyffarth seemed to be winning until a photographer tried to take a picture of him and stepped onto the ice. Seyffarth brushed the photographer, losing several seconds, and went on to lose his heat and finally come in seventh overall. The winner of the race was Reidar Liaklev with a time of 8:29.4, well above Seyffarth's 1941 world record of 8:13.7. Seyffarth's official 5,000 m time was 8:37.9.

The day after his disappointing 5000 m race, Seyffarth won Olympic silver on the 1,500 m, half a second behind Norwegian skater Sverre Farstad. The day after that, Seyffarth won Olympic gold on the 10000 m with a time of 17:26.30, not a particularly fast time considering that the world record at the time was 17:01.50. He won with relative ease, however, almost ten seconds ahead of silver medallist Lassi Parkkinen from Finland.

== National titles ==
Domestically Seyffarth won 22 Single Distance Championships between 1940 and 1948. Note that Sweden did not have any National Allround Championships from 1935 to 1962 – only National Single Distance Championships.

== World records ==
Over the course of his career, Seyffarth skated two world records:

Discipline	Time	Date	Location
5000 m	8.13,7	3 February 1941	Davos
3000 m	4.45,7	3 February 1942	Davos

Source: SpeedSkatingStats.com

== Personal records ==
To put these personal records in perspective, the column WR lists the official world records on the dates that Seyffarth skated his personal records.

Event	Result	Date	Venue	WR
500 m	43.2	31 January 1942	Davos	41.8
1000 m	1:27.5	1 February 1942	Davos	1:28.4
1500 m	2:14.2	29 January 1941	Davos	2:13.8
3000 m	4:43.5	31 January 1942	Davos	4:49.6
5000 m	8:13.7	3 February 1941	Davos	8:17.2
10000 m	17:07.5	4 February 1942	Davos	17:01.5

Note that Seyffarth's personal records on the 1000 m and the 3000 m were not recognised as official world records by the International Skating Union.

Seyffarth has an Adelskalender score of 188.678 points. He was number one on the Adelskalender for a total of 3640 days, from 4 February 1942 until 23 January 1952. This long period included World War II – during that war, and for a few years afterwards, very few competitions were held.

== Death ==
Seyffarth died on 1 January 1998, at Mora, Sweden, at the age of 78, 14 days before his 79th birthday and several years after suffering a stroke.
