= Aad de Koning =

Dutch speed skater

Personal information
- Nationality: Dutch
- Born: 25 December 1928 Purmerend, Netherlands
- Died: 29 May 2010 (aged 81) Zuidoostbeemster, Netherlands

Sport
- Sport: Speed skating

Aad de Koning (25 December 1928 – 29 May 2010) was a Dutch speed skater. He competed in three events at the 1948 Winter Olympics.

== Personal ==
De Koning was born in Purmerend and died in the Zuidoostbeemster in May 2010, aged 81. Several people in his family were speed skaters.

Jacobus de Koning; 1850 - 1936	Catharina Maria Elisabeth Turkenburg; 1858 - 1929
Coenradus Cornelis Josephus de Koning; 1879 - 1954	Petronella Boot; 1858 - 1930	Jacobus Petrus de Koning; 1885 - 1962	Maria van Schaik; 1882 - 1929
Jacobus Petrus Coenradus de Koning; 1907	Jacobus de Koning; 1921	onbekend	Adrianus Jacobus Petrus de Koning; 1928 - 2010	Paulien
Jacques de Koning; 1950	Geertruida Catharina Dijkstra; 1951
Jacques de Koning; 1981	Esther
