= Netherlands at the 1948 Winter Olympics =

- Flag of the Netherlands
- IOC code: NED
- NOC: Dutch Olympic Committee

in St. Moritz
- Competitors: 4 in 1 sport
- Flag bearer: Jan Langedijk (speedskating)
- Medals: Gold 0 Silver 0 Bronze 0 Total 0

Winter Olympics appearances (overview)
- 1928; 1932; 1936; 1948; 1952; 1956; 1960; 1964; 1968; 1972; 1976; 1980; 1984; 1988; 1992; 1994; 1998; 2002; 2006; 2010; 2014; 2018; 2022; 2026

Athletes from the Netherlands competed at the 1948 Winter Olympics in St. Moritz, Switzerland.

== Speed skating ==
Men

Event	Athlete	Race	
Event	Athlete	Time	Rank
500 m	Kees Broekman	46.3	28
500 m	Anton Huiskes	46.2	27
500 m	Jan Langedijk	46.4	29
500 m	Aad de Koning	45.9	23
1500 m	Kees Broekman	2:21.0	9
1500 m	Anton Huiskes	2:25.0	24
1500 m	Jan Langedijk	2:21.9	13
1500 m	Aad de Koning	2:25.3	25
5000 m	Kees Broekman	8:37.3	6
5000 m	Anton Huiskes	8:46.4	12
5000 m	Jan Langedijk	8:36.2	5
5000 m	Aad de Koning	8:57.6	20
10,000 m	Kees Broekman	17:54.7	5
10,000 m	Anton Huiskes	20:16.4	14
10,000 m	Jan Langedijk	17:55.3	6
