= Speed skating at the 1948 Winter Olympics =

Speed skating at the V Olympic Winter Games
- Pictogram for speed skating
- Venue: St. Moritz Olympic Ice Rink
- Date: 31 January – 3 February 1948
- No. of events: 4
- Competitors: 68 from 15 nations

At the 1948 Winter Olympics, four speed skating events were contested.

== Medal summary ==
| Event | Gold | | Silver | | Bronze | |
|---|---|---|---|---|---|---|
| 500 metres | Finn Helgesen; Norway | 43.1 | Ken Bartholomew; United States Thomas Byberg; Norway Robert Fitzgerald; United States | 43.2 | None awarded | |
| 1500 metres | Sverre Farstad; Norway | 2:17.6 | Åke Seyffarth; Sweden | 2:18.1 | Odd Lundberg; Norway | 2:18.9 |
| 5000 metres | Reidar Liaklev; Norway | 8:29.4 | Odd Lundberg; Norway | 8:32.7 | Göthe Hedlund; Sweden | 8:34.8 |
| 10,000 metres | Åke Seyffarth; Sweden | 17:26.3 | Lassi Parkkinen; Finland | 17:36.0 | Pentti Lammio; Finland | 17:42.7 |

== Participating nations ==
Twelve speed skaters competed in all four events.

A total of 68 speed skaters from 15 nations competed at the St. Moritz Games:

- Austria (3)
- Belgium (1)
- Canada (4)
- Czechoslovakia (1)
- Denmark (1)
- Finland (5)
- Great Britain (5)
- Hungary (5)
- Italy (4)
- Netherlands (4)
- Norway (12)
- South Korea (3)
- Sweden (6)
- Switzerland (5)
- United States (9)

== Medal table ==
| Rank | Nation | Gold | Silver | Bronze | Total |
|---|---|---|---|---|---|
| 1 | Norway | 3 | 2 | 1 | 6 |
| 2 | Sweden | 1 | 1 | 1 | 3 |
| 3 | United States | 0 | 2 | 0 | 2 |
| 4 | Finland | 0 | 1 | 1 | 2 |
| Totals (4 entries) | | 4 | 6 | 3 | 13 |
