= Finn Helgesen =

Norwegian speed skater (1919–2011)

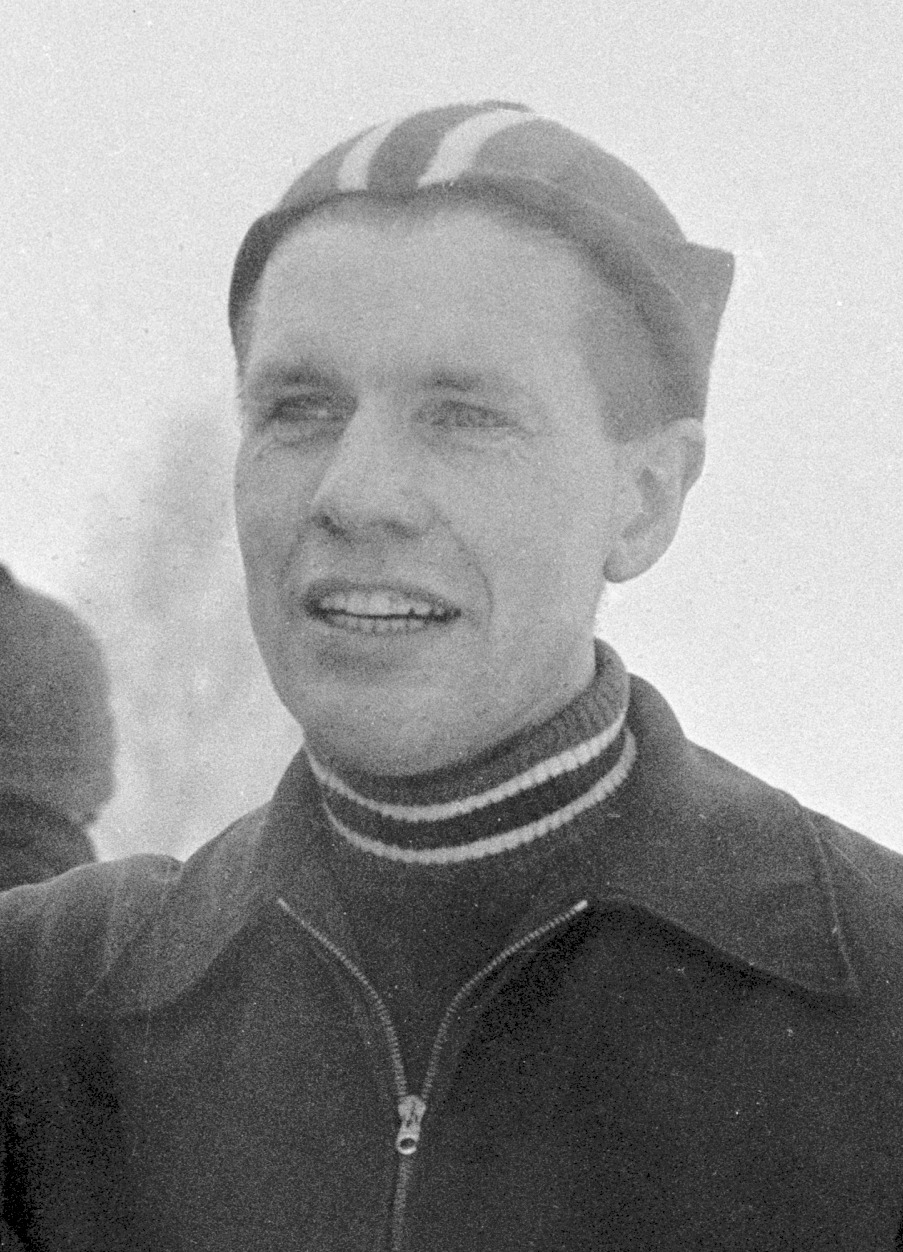

Personal information
- Born: 25 April 1919 Drammen, Norway
- Died: 3 September 2011 (aged 92) Lørenskog, Norway

Sport
- Sport: Speed skating
- Club: Oslo Skøiteklub
Medal record
Representing Norway
Olympic Games
Gold medal – first place	1948 St. Moritz	500 m

Finn Helgesen (25 April 1919 – 3 September 2011) was a speed skater from Norway.

== Career ==
Competing in the 500m, he won the national title in 1947 and 1949 and an Olympic gold medal in 1948. In 1948 he set a new Olympic record at 43.1 seconds, a mere 0.1 seconds ahead of three skaters who placed second. At the 1952 Winter Olympics in Oslo, Helgesen and two other skaters had a time of 44.0 seconds on the 500m, a time good enough for bronze, but because Helgesen had lost in the heats against one of those two skaters, he was ranked fifth. Note that due to the times being measured to a precision of only one-tenth of a second in those days, at the speeds on the 500 m, it was possible for two skaters to finish in the same time, while one of them finished more than one meter ahead of the other. Meanwhile, the speed was such that in one tenth of second skaters covered more than one meter.

Helgesen skated for Oslo Skøiteklub ("Oslo Skating Club"), together with many other famous Norwegian skaters: Roald Aas, Ivar Ballangrud, Bernt Evensen, Rudolf Gundersen, Oscar Mathisen, and Laila Schou Nilsen, amongst others.

== Personal life ==
He was born in Drammen as seventh out of ten siblings, but when he was seven years old his family moved to Strømmen, an industrial site next to Oslo. He was a promising young skater, placing third over 500 m at the national junior championships in 1940, but his career was interrupted by World War II. In 1942 he married and had a daughter, Brit. His wife died from tuberculosis three years later, and he moved with his young daughter to his parents' house. He remarried in 1953, and had two more daughters, Monica and Kate, and one son, Kyrre. Helgesen retired from competition in 1956 and became a speed skating coach at his club Oslo Skøiteklub. He also worked as a mechanic, first at Strømmen Værksted until 1960 and then at the Institute for Energy Technology.

== Personal records ==
To put these personal records in perspective, the WR column lists the official world records on the dates that Helgesen skated his personal records.

Event	Result	Date	Venue	WR
500 m	43.1	31 January 1948	St. Moritz	41.8
1,000 m	1:31.5	27 January 1952	Gjøvik	1:28.4
1,500 m	2:25.4	3 January 1952	Oslo	2:13.8
3,000 m	5:15.4			
5,000 m	9:05.1			
10,000 m	18:39.4			

Helgesen has an Adelskalender score of 202.046 points.
