= Odd Lundberg =

Norwegian speed skater

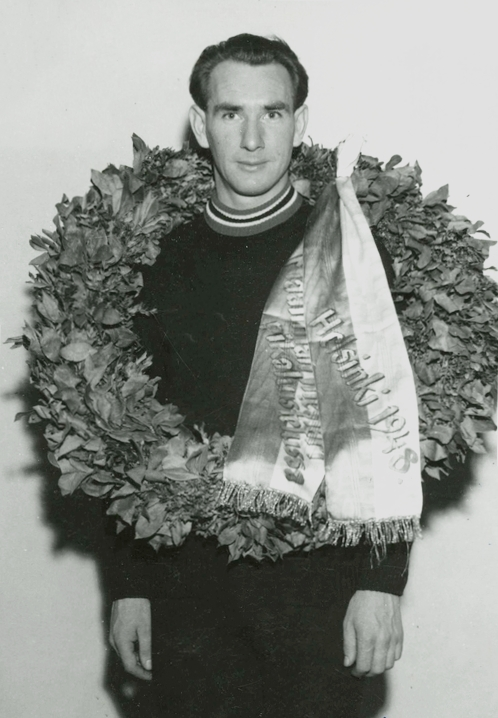
- Lundberg in 1948

Personal information
- Nationality: Norwegian
- Born: Odd Harald Lundberg; 3 October 1917 Brandbu, Norway
- Died: 7 March 1983 (aged 65) Oslo, Norway

Sport
- Country: Norway
- Sport: Speed skating
- Club: Brandbu IF (1931–32); Jaren IF (1932/33–1937/38); Brandbu IF (1938/39–1940/41); Oslo IL (1941-42–1955-56); Oslo SK (1956/57–1959/60); Oslo IL (1960/61–1969/70)

Achievements and titles
- Personal best(s): 500 m: 43.4 (1949); 1000 m: 1:32.3 (1949); 1500 m: 2:18.2 (1949); 3000 m: 4:50.0 (1958); 5000 m: 8:14.5 (1958); 10 000 m: 17:10.5 (1958)
Medal record
Representing Norway
Olympic Games
Silver medal – second place	1948 St. Moritz	5,000 m
Bronze medal – third place	1948 St. Moritz	1,500 m

Odd Harald Lundberg (3 October 1917 – 7 March 1983) was a speed skater from Norway.

Lundberg became World Allround Champion in Helsinki in 1948, finished third in Oslo in 1949, and second in Eskilstuna in 1950. He also won a competition in Bislett, Oslo in 1946, which was announced as unofficial World Championships. At the 1948 Winter Olympics of St. Moritz, he won silver on the 5,000 m, bronze on the 1,500 m, and finished in seventh place on the 10,000 m.

Lundberg was active over a period of 25 years; his last international event was in 1958, and he participated in the Norwegian Championships in 1961, 43 years old.

== Medals ==
An overview of medals won by Lundberg at important championships he participated in, listing the years in which he won each:

Championships	Gold medal	Silver medal	Bronze medal
Winter Olympics	–	1948 (5,000 m)	1948 (1,500 m)
World Allround	(1946); 1948	1950	1949
European Allround	–	–	1948
Norwegian Allround	1948	1947	1946

Note that the 1946 World Allround Championships were unofficial.

== Personal records ==
To put these personal records in perspective, the WR column lists the official world records on the dates that Lundberg skated his personal records.

Event	Result	Date	Venue	WR
500 m	43.4	5 February 1949	Davos	41.8
1,000 m	1:32.3	2 March 1940	Hamar	1:28.4
1,500 m	2:18.2	6 February 1949	Davos	2:13.8
3,000 m	4:50.0	22 March 1958	Geilo	4:40.2
5,000 m	8:14.5	15 March 1958	Fagernes	7:45.6
10,000 m	17:10.5	16 March 1958	Fagernes	16:32.6

Lundberg has an Adelskalender score of 190.441 points.
