= Kornél Pajor =

Hungarian speed skater (1923–2016)

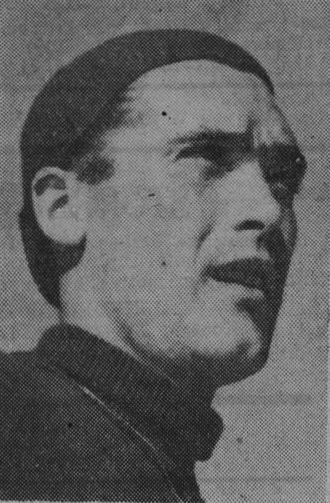
Kornél Pajor

Kornél Pajor (1 July 1923 – May 2016) was a Hungarian speed skating World Champion. He was born in Budapest.

== Career ==
In early 1943, Pajor was a young and promising skater of 19 years old, but because World War II was in progress there were not many competitions. In Klagenfurt, Austria, at one of the few skating competitions that year, he won the 3000 m. After the war, skating competitions slowly returned to normal, and Pajor participated in the 1948 Winter Olympics of St. Moritz, with a fourth place on the 10000 m as his best result.

The next year, 1949, turned out to be Pajor's best year: He became Hungarian National Allround Champion for the fourth time and then won bronze at the European Allround Championships, while setting a new world record on the 5000 m during those championships. On the 10000 m during those championships, he skated a time of 16:58.7, which was faster than Charles Mathiesen's nine-year-old world record of 17:01.5 on that distance. However, Hjalmar Andersen became the new world record holder on the 10000 m, skating an even faster 16:57.4. Two weeks later, at the 1949 World Allround Championships in Oslo, Norway, Pajor won gold, making him the first Hungarian skater to become World Allround Champion. As of 2007, he is still the only Hungarian, male or female, to win gold, or even any medal, at any of the different disciplines of World Championships in speed skating (Emese Hunyady of course having been naturalised to the Austrian nationality (1985) when she became World Champion (1994 Allround; 1999 1500m)

After those 1949 World Championships, Pajor did not return home from Oslo, defecting from Hungary. When Pajor participated in the 1951 World Allround Championships and won a bronze medal, he did not represent any country. The International Skating Union (ISU) allowed him to participate as an "independent skater" representing the ISU. In 1952, skating for IF Castor (Idrottsföreningen Castor – Sport Federation Castor) of Östersund, Sweden, Pajor won bronze at the European Allround Championships held in his new hometown of Östersund, representing Sweden.

In Sweden he worked as an architect and had his own architect firm in Djursholm.

== Medals ==
An overview of medals won by Pajor at important championships he participated in, listing the years in which he won each:

Championships	Gold medal	Silver medal	Bronze medal
Winter Olympics	–	–	–
World Allround	1949	–	1951
European Allround	–	–	1949; 1952
Hungarian Allround	1944; 1947; 1948; 1949	1943	–

== World record ==
Over the course of his career, Pajor skated one world record:

Discipline	Time	Date	Location
5000 m	8.13,5	February 5, 1949	(Switzerland) Davos

Source: SpeedSkatingStats.com

== Personal records ==
To put these personal records in perspective, the WR column lists the official world records on the dates that Pajor skated his personal records.

Event	Result	Date	Venue	WR
500 m	44.1	3 February 1951	Davos	41.8
1500 m	2:16.5	27 January 1952	Davos	2:12.9
3000 m	4:47.5	24 January 1953	Davos	4:45.7
5000 m	8:13.5	5 February 1949	Davos	8:13.7
10000 m	16:58.7	6 February 1949	Davos	17:01.5

Note that Pajors's personal record on the 10000 m was not a world record because Hjalmar Andersen skated 16:57.4 at the same tournament.

Pajor has an Adelskalender score of 189.885 points. His highest ranking on the Adelskalender was a seventh place.
