= Lassi Parkkinen =

Finnish speed skater (1917–1994)

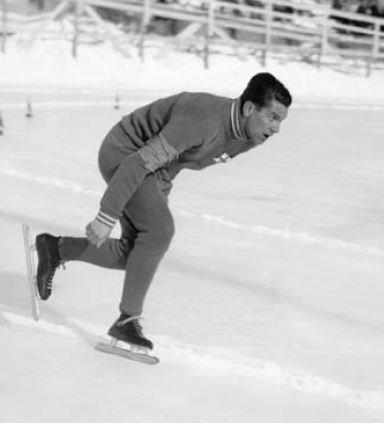
- Lassi Parkkinen at the beginning of 1950s

Personal information
- Nationality: Finnish
- Born: Lauri Rikhard Parkkinen; 8 May 1917 Varkaus, Finland
- Died: 3 October 1994 (aged 77) Espoo, Finland

Sport
- Country: Finland
- Sport: Speed skating

Achievements and titles
- Personal best(s): 500 m: 43.2 (1952); 1000 m: 1:34.6 (1947); 1500 m: 2:19.6 (1948); 3000 m: 4:57.4 (1947); 5000 m: 8:25.1 (1952); 10 000 m: 17:25.7 (1947)
Medal record
Representing Finland
Men's speed skating
Silver medal – second place	1948 St. Moritz	10,000 m

Lauri ("Lassi") Rikhard Parkkinen (8 May 1917 – 3 October 1994) was a Finnish speed skater.

Lassi Parkkinen was born in Varkaus, an industrial town in the southeast of Finland. He made his debut at the World Allround Championships in 1938, finishing ninth. He also participated the next year, 1939, in what would turn out to be the last World Championships before World War II, but his results on the first three distances were not good enough to qualify for the final distance. Due to the war, it took eight years before the World Championships were held again. At these first World Championships since World War II, Parkkinen was crowned the 1947 World Champion. His success continued the next year at the 1948 Winter Olympics of St. Moritz, when he won Olympic silver on the 10,000 m.

His final speed skating successes came in 1952 when he won silver at the World Championships and became Finnish Allround Champion for the fifth and last time. He also skated at the 1952 Winter Olympics of Oslo, but his 10,000 m time of 17:36.8 – almost identical to the time that won him silver in 1948 – was only good for the eighth place. His best result at those 1952 Winter Olympics was a sixth place on the 1,500 m. The next year, 1953, Parkkinen finished only twelfth at the World Championships and he retired from speed skating soon afterwards. He kept involved in speed skating though, being vice-chairman of the Suomen Luisteluliitto (Finnish Skating Association) from 1954 to 1960, as well as being a committee member of the International Skating Union from 1957 to 1964.

Parkkinen died in 1994, aged 77.

== Medals ==
An overview of medals won by Parkkinen at important championships he participated in, listing the years in which he won each:

Championships	Gold medal	Silver medal	Bronze medal
Winter Olympics	–	1948 (10,000 m)	–
World Allround	1947	1952	–
European Allround	–	–	–

In addition, Parkkinen was Finnish National Allround Champion in 1941, 1943, 1944, 1946, and 1952 – a total of five times.

== Personal records ==
To put these personal records in perspective, the WR column lists the official world records on the dates that Parkkinen skated his personal records.

Event	Result	Date	Venue	WR
500 m	43.9	9 February 1952	Hamar	41.2
1,000 m	1:34.6	March 1947		1:28.4
1,500 m	2:19.6	2 February 1948	St. Moritz	2:13.8
3,000 m	4:57.4	26 February 1947	Helsinki	4:45.7
5,000 m	8:25.1	1 March 1952	Hamar	8:07.3
10,000 m	17:25.7	10 February 1946	Oslo	17:01.5

Note that the official world record on the 5,000 m on the day that Parkkinen skated his personal record on that distance was Hjalmar Andersen's time of 8:07.3. In the meantime, Nikolay Mamonov had skated a time of 8:03.7, but Mamonov's time was not recognised as a world record by the International Skating Union (ISU) until the 1955 ISU Congress.

Parkkinen has an Adelskalender score of 193.228 points.
