= Reidar Liaklev =

Norwegian speed skater

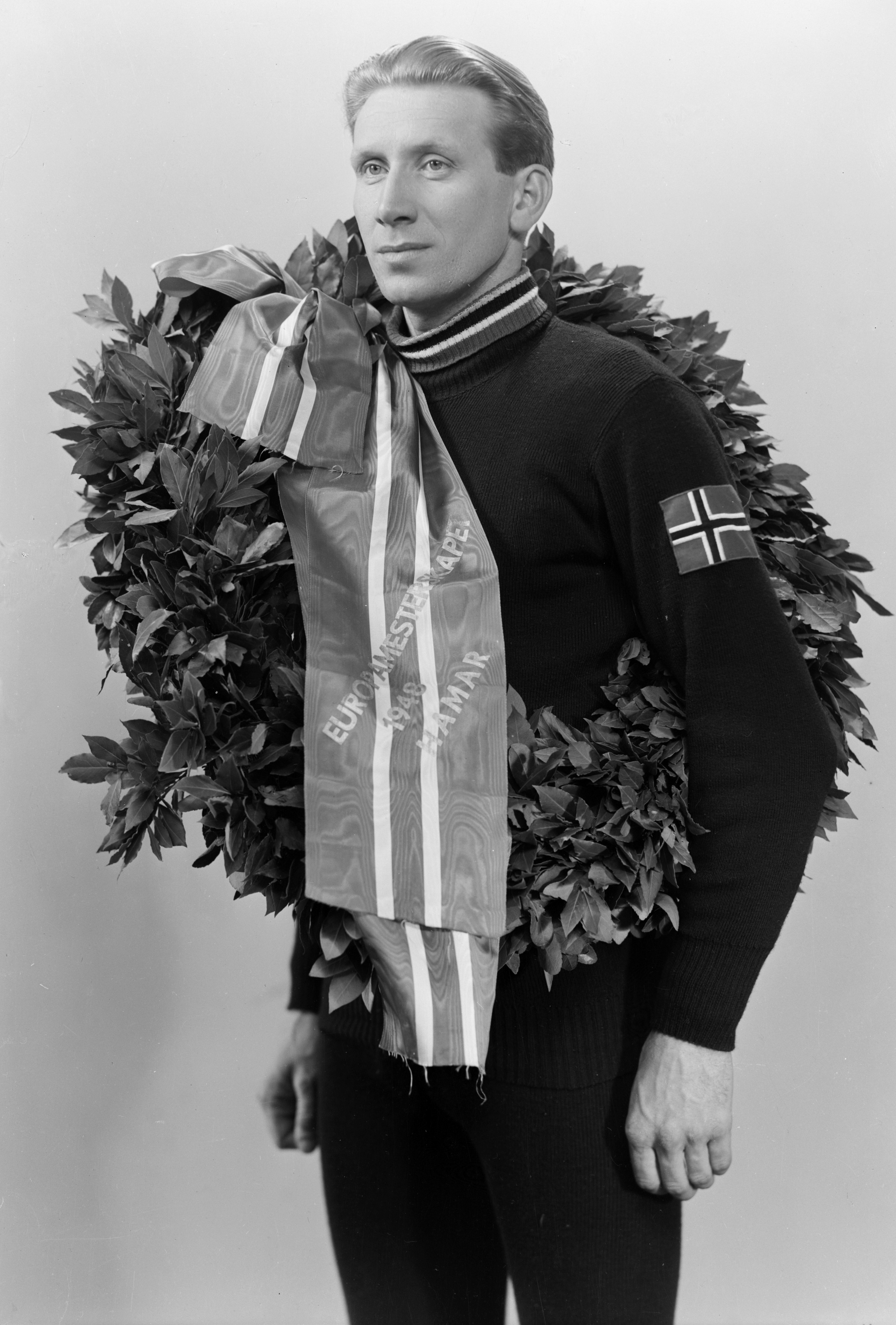
- Liaklev at the 1948 European Championships

Personal information
- Born: 15 July 1917 Jaren, Norway
- Died: 1 March 2006 (aged 88) Jaren, Norway

Sport
- Sport: Speed skating
- Club: Brandbu IF
Medal record
Representing Norway
Olympic Games
Gold medal – first place	1948 St. Moritz	5000 m
European Speed Skating Championships
Gold medal – first place	1948 Hamar	Allround
Silver medal – second place	1950 Helsinki	Allround

Reidar Kristofer Liaklev (15 July 1917 – 1 March 2006) was a speed skater from Norway who won the gold medal in the 5000 m event at the 1948 Winter Olympics. Liaklev was a long distance specialist, yet he won the European Allround Championships in 1948.

Liaklev won bronze at the junior Norwegian Championships in 1939, and as for most athletes of his time, his career was interrupted by World War II. His first international senior tournament was the 1947 World Allround Championships, where he finished third on the 5,000 m, won the 10,000 m event, and placed fourth overall.

In the first Winter Olympics after World War II, in February 1948, Liaklev won the 5000 m in a time of 8:29.4. He also participated in the 10,000 m, but failed to finish due to breathing problems at high altitudes. Two weeks later, he won the European Championships in Hamar. In 1949, he became Norwegian Allround Champion. The following year he won a silver medal at the European Allround Championships in Helsinki, and won the 10,000 m event there.

Liaklev represented Brandbu Idrettsforening (Brandbu Sports Association). He retired around 1950 and became a speed skating coach and member of the Norwegian Skating Association board. He also worked as a post master and a beekeeper in his home village of Jaren, and served on the community council.

== Personal records ==
To put these personal records in perspective, the WR column lists the official world records on the dates that Liaklev skated his personal records.

Event	Result	Date	Venue	WR
500 m	44.0	5 February 1949	Davos	41.8
1,000 m	1:34.5	7 March 1949	Hamar	1:28.4
1,500 m	2:16.6	6 February 1949	Davos	2:13.8
3,000 m	4:58.0	23 February 1950	Jevnaker	4:45.7
5,000 m	8:18.0	25 February 1950	Gjøvik	8:13.5
10,000 m	17:24.9	15 February 1948	Hamar	17:01.5

Liaklev has an Adelskalender score of 191.578 points. His highest ranking on the Adelskalender was a ninth place.
