= Speed skating at the 1956 Winter Olympics – Men's 500 metres =

Men's 500 metres speed skating at the VII Olympic Winter Games
- Pictogram for speed skating
- Venue: Lake Misurina
- Date: 28 January 1956
- Competitors: 47 from 17 nations
- Winning time: 40.2 =WR

Medalists
1st place, gold medalist(s)		Yevgeny Grishin	Soviet Union
2nd place, silver medalist(s)		Rafael Grach	Soviet Union
3rd place, bronze medalist(s)		Alv Gjestvang	Norway

The 500 metres speed skating event was part of the speed skating at the 1956 Winter Olympics program. The competition was held on naturally frozen ice on the Lake Misurina. It was held on Saturday, 28 January 1956, and started at noon and ended at 1:15 PM. Forty-seven speed skaters from 17 nations competed.

== Medalists ==
Gold	Silver	Bronze
Yevgeny Grishin; Soviet Union	Rafayel Grach; Soviet Union	Alv Gjestvang; Norway

== Records ==
These were the standing world and Olympic records (in seconds) prior to the 1956 Winter Olympics.

World record	40.2(*)	(Soviet Union) Yevgeny Grishin	Cortina d'Ampezzo/Lake Misurina (ITA)	22 January 1956
Olympic record	43.1	(Norway) Finn Helgesen	St. Moritz (SUI)	31 January 1948

(*) The record was set in a high altitude venue (more than 1000 metres above sea level) and on naturally frozen ice.

Yevgeny Grishin equalized his own world record.

== Results ==
Yevgeny Grishin set a new world record only six days before this event on the same venue. He equalized his world record time and won the gold medal.

Place	Speed skater	Time
1	Yevgeny Grishin (URS)	40.2 =WR
2	Rafayel Grach (URS)	40.8
3	Alv Gjestvang (NOR)	41.0
4	Yuri Sergeev (URS)	41.1
5	Toivo Salonen (FIN)	41.7
6	Bill Carow (USA)	41.8
7	Colin Hickey (AUS)	41.9
7	Bengt Malmsten (SWE)	41.9
9	Matti Hamberg (FIN)	42.2
9	Juhani Järvinen (FIN)	42.2
11	Shinkichi Takemura (JPN)	42.4
11	Johnny Werket (USA)	42.4
13	Finn Hodt (NOR)	42.5
13	Yrjö Uimonen (FIN)	42.5
15	Bertil Eng (SWE)	42.6
16	Sigmund Søfteland (NOR)	42.7
17	Hroar Elvenes (NOR)	42.8
17	Ken Henry (USA)	42.8
17	Yoshitaki Hori (JPN)	42.8
17	Bohumil Jauris (TCH)	42.8
21	Johnny Cronshey (GBR)	42.9
22	Taketsugu Asazaka (JPN)	43.1
22	Guido Citterio (ITA)	43.1
22	Gerard Maarse (NED)	43.1
25	Gordon Audley (CAN)	43.2
25	Raymond Gilloz (FRA)	43.2
25	Don McDermott (USA)	43.2
28	Jang Yeong (KOR)	43.5
28	Vladimír Kolář (TCH)	43.5
30	Jaroslav Doubek (TCH)	43.6
30	Kiyotaka Takabayashi (JPN)	43.6
32	Franz Offenberger (AUT)	43.8
33	Guido Caroli (ITA)	43.9
34	Jo Yun-sik (KOR)	44.0
34	Helmut Kuhnert (EUA)	44.0
36	Ralf Olin (CAN)	44.1
37	Ernst Biel (AUT)	44.2
37	Kees Broekman (NED)	44.2
37	Sigvard Ericsson (SWE)	44.2
40	Erich Kull (SUI)	44.3
41	Kurt Eminger (AUT)	44.4
42	Gunnar Ström (SWE)	44.7
43	Wim de Graaff (NED)	44.9
44	Alex Connell (GBR)	45.2
45	John Hearn (GBR)	45.9
—	Yuri Mikhaylov (URS)	DNF
—	Johnny Sands (CAN)	DNF

Johnny Sands and Yuri Mikhaylov did not finish after a fall.

== See also ==
- List of IOC country codes
- 1956 Winter Olympics
