= Speed skating at the 1956 Winter Olympics – Men's 1500 metres =

Men's 1500 metres speed skating at the VII Olympic Winter Games
- Pictogram for speed skating
- Venue: Lake Misurina
- Date: 30 January 1956
- Competitors: 54 from 18 nations
- Winning time: 2:08.6 WR

Medalists
1st place, gold medalist(s)		Yevgeny Grishin; Soviet Union
1st place, gold medalist(s)		Yuri Mikhaylov; Soviet Union
3rd place, bronze medalist(s)		Toivo Salonen; Finland

The 1500 metres speed skating event was part of the speed skating at the 1956 Winter Olympics programme. The competition was held on naturally frozen ice on the Lake Misurina. It was held on Monday, 30 January 1956, started at 2 PM and ended at 4:05 PM. Fifty-four speed skaters from 18 nations competed.

== Medalists ==
There was no silver medalist as Soviet competitors Yevgeny Grishin and Yuri Mikhaylov tied for first place. Toivo Salonen from Finland won the bronze medal.

Gold	Silver	Bronze
Yevgeny Grishin; Soviet Union Yuri Mikhaylov; Soviet Union		Toivo Salonen; Finland

== Records ==
These were the standing world and Olympic records (in minutes) prior to the 1956 Winter Olympics.

World record	2:09.1(*)	(Soviet Union) Yuri Mikhaylov	Davos (SUI)	20 January 1956
Olympic record	2:17.6(*)	(Norway) Sverre Farstad	St. Moritz (SUI)	2 February 1948

(*) The record was set in a high altitude venue (more than 1000 metres above sea level) and on naturally frozen ice.

Skating in the first pair, Toivo Salonen set a new Olympic record with 2:09.4 minutes. Yevgeny Grishin, who skated in the eleventh pair, bettered the world record with 2:08.6 minutes. In the twelfth pair, Yuri Mikhaylov was able to equalize the world record.

== Results ==
Place	Speed skater	Time
1	Yevgeny Grishin (URS)	2:08.6 WR
1	Yuri Mikhaylov (URS)	2:08.6 WR
3	Toivo Salonen (FIN)	2:09.4
4	Juhani Järvinen (FIN)	2:09.7
5	Robert Merkulov (URS)	2:10.3
6	Sigvard Ericsson (SWE)	2:11.0
7	Colin Hickey (AUS)	2:11.8
8	Boris Shilkov (URS)	2:11.9
9	Knut Johannesen (NOR)	2:12.2
10	Roald Aas (NOR)	2:12.9
11	Bertil Eng (SWE)	2:13.1
11	Wim de Graaff (NED)	2:13.1
11	Gerard Maarse (NED)	2:13.1
14	Kees Broekman (NED)	2:13.1
15	Bohumil Jauris (TCH)	2:13.6
16	Jan Kristiansen (NOR)	2:13.7
17	Bengt Malmsten (SWE)	2:14.6
18	Matti Hamberg (FIN)	2:14.8
19	Johnny Cronshey (GBR)	2:15.0
20	Pat McNamara (USA)	2:15.2
21	Taketsugu Asazaka (JPN)	2:15.4
22	Gunnar Ström (SWE)	2:15.6
23	Yoshitaki Hori (JPN)	2:15.9
24	Hroar Elvenes (NOR)	2:16.0
25	Johnny Werket (USA)	2:16.1
26	Leo Tynkkynen (FIN)	2:16.2
27	Guido Citterio (ITA)	2:16.5
27	Vladimír Kolář (TCH)	2:16.5
29	Jang Yeong (KOR)	2:16.7
30	Gene Sandvig (USA)	2:17.1
31	Franz Offenberger (AUT)	2:17.3
32	Arthur Mannsbarth (AUT)	2:17.4
33	John Hearn (GBR)	2:17.5
34	Raymond Gilloz (FRA)	2:17.7
35	Hans Keller (EUA)	2:18.1
36	Shinkichi Takemura (JPN)	2:18.3
37	Don McDermott (USA)	2:18.6
38	Kurt Eminger (AUT)	2:19.0
39	Jaroslav Doubek (TCH)	2:19.2
39	Yoshiyasu Gomi (JPN)	2:19.2
41	Ralf Olin (CAN)	2:19.7
42	Guido Caroli (ITA)	2:20.0
42	Jo Yun-Sik (KOR)	2:20.0
44	Kim Jong-sun (KOR)	2:20.5
45	Johnny Sands (CAN)	2:20.7
46	Jürg Rohrbach (SUI)	2:21.7
46	Erich Kull (SUI)	2:21.7
48	Remo Tomasi (ITA)	2:22.2
49	Nico Olsthoorn (NED)	2:22.6
50	Alex Connell (GBR)	2:23.0
51	Ernst Biel (AUT)	2:23.5
51	Pyeon Chang-nam (KOR)	2:23.5
53	Gordon Audley (CAN)	2:26.1
—	Pierre Huylebroeck (BEL)	DNF

Kees Broekman was placed 14th because he was paired up with Bertil Eng and finished behind his opponent.

Pierre Huylebroeck did not finish after a fall.

== See also ==
- List of IOC country codes
- 1956 Winter Olympics
