= Alpine skiing at the 1956 Winter Olympics – Women's slalom =

The women's slalom at the 1956 Winter Olympics was held on 30 January. It was run on the Col Druscie. The course was 456 metres (1,496 ft) in length with a 175 m (574 ft) vertical drop. There were forty-one gates on the first run and forty-five gates for the second run. Forty-eight women from sixteen countries entered in the race. Twelve women were disqualified during the two runs. Swiss skier Renée Colliard won gold over Austrian Regina Schöpf, who placed second, and Russian Yevgeniya Sidorova, who won the bronze.

== Medalists ==
Gold	Silver	Bronze
Renée Colliard; Switzerland	Regina Schöpf; Austria	Yevgeniya Sidorova; Soviet Union

== Results ==
Place	Alpine skier	1st run	2nd run	Total	Difference
1st place, gold medalist(s)	Renée Colliard (SUI)	55.6	56.7	112.3	
2nd place, silver medalist(s)	Regina Schöpf (AUT)	56.0	59.4	115.4	+3.1
3rd place, bronze medalist(s)	Yevgeniya Sidorova (URS)	56.9	59.8	116.7	+4.4
4	Giuliana Chenal-Minuzzo (ITA)	56.9	59.9	116.8	+4.6
5	Josefine Frandl (AUT)	60.4	57.5	117.9	+5.6
6	Inger Bjørnbakken (NOR)	58.7	59.3	118.0	+5.7
6	Astrid Sandvik (NOR)	58.9	59.1	118.0	+5.7
8	Josette Neviere (FRA)	60.3	58.0	118.3	+6.0
9	Marysette Agnel (FRA)	58.2	60.6	118.8	+6.5
10	Frieda Dänzer (SUI)	59.2	59.7	118.9	+6.6
11	Borghild Niskin (NOR)	59.0	60.0	119.0	+6.7
12	Dorothea Hochleitner (AUT)	60.4	60.6	121.0	+8.7
13	Inger Jorgensen (NOR)	61.4	60.9	122.3	+10.0
14	Hannelore Glaser (EUA)	61.8	62.9	124.7	+12.4
15	Hedi Beeler (SUI)	61.9	63.2	125.1	+12.8
16	Anna Pellissier (ITA)	61.2	65.3	126.5	+14.2
17	Madeleine Berthod (SUI)	64.6*	58.7	128.3	+16.0
18	Paule Moris (FRA)	73.9	61.7	135.6	+23.3
18	Ginette Seguin (CAN)	65.6	70.0	135.6	+23.3
20	Dorothy Surgenor (USA)	69.1	68.2	137.3	+25.0
21	Mirl Buchner (EUA)	61.7	71.8*	138.5	+26.2
22	Maria Kowalska (POL)	58.7	83.0	141.7	+29.4
23	Carlyn Kruger (CAN)	74.7	67.6	142.3	+30.0
24	Hilde Hofherr (AUT)	58.2	85.3	143.5	+31.2
25	Zandra Nowell (GBR)	70.5	75.3	145.8	+33.5
25	Andrea Mead Lawrence (USA)	57.5	88.3	145.8	+33.5
27	Gladys Werner (USA)	73.9	76.2	150.1	+37.8
28	Vivi-Anne Wassdahl (SWE)	86.2*	59.6	150.8	+38.5
29	Vera Schenone (ITA)	65.1	92.1	157.2	+44.9
30	Anne Heggtveit (CAN)	91.0	67.2	158.2	+45.9
31	Penny Pitou (USA)	86.2	76.3	162.5	+50.2
32	Slava Zupancic (YUG)	95.0	68.5	163.5	+51.2
33	Christine Davy (AUS)	86.1	81.5	167.6	+55.3
34	Sue Holmes (GBR)	75.0	100.9	175.9	+63.6
35	Jocelyn Wardrop-Moore (GBR)	114.4	86.0	200.4	+88.1
—	Mauriel Lip (FRA)	DSQ			
—	Marianne Seltsam (EUA)	DSQ			
—	Eivor Berglund (SWE)	DSQ			
—	Maria Gasienica-Daniel (POL)	DSQ			
—	Cristina Ebner (ITA)	DSQ			
—	Aleksandra Artemenko (URS)	DSQ			
—	Magdalena Marotineanu (ROM)	DSQ			
—	Elena Epuran (ROM)	DSQ			
—	Jakobina Jakobsdottir (ISL)		DSQ		
—	Lucille Wheeler (CAN)		DSQ		
—	Ossi Reichert (EUA)		DSQ		
—	Adeline Pryor (GBR)			INJ	

* 5 seconds penalty added.

== See also ==
- List of IOC country codes
- 1956 Winter Olympics
