= Alpine skiing at the 1956 Winter Olympics – Men's downhill =

Men's downhill at the VII Olympic Winter Games
- Alpine skiing
- Venue: Olimpia - Tofana; Cortina d'Ampezzo, Italy
- Date: 3 February 1956
- Competitors: 75 from 27 nations
- Winning time: 2:52.2

Medalists
1st place, gold medalist(s)		Toni Sailer	Austria
2nd place, silver medalist(s)		Raymond Fellay	Switzerland
3rd place, bronze medalist(s)		Anderl Molterer	Austria

Men's Downhill
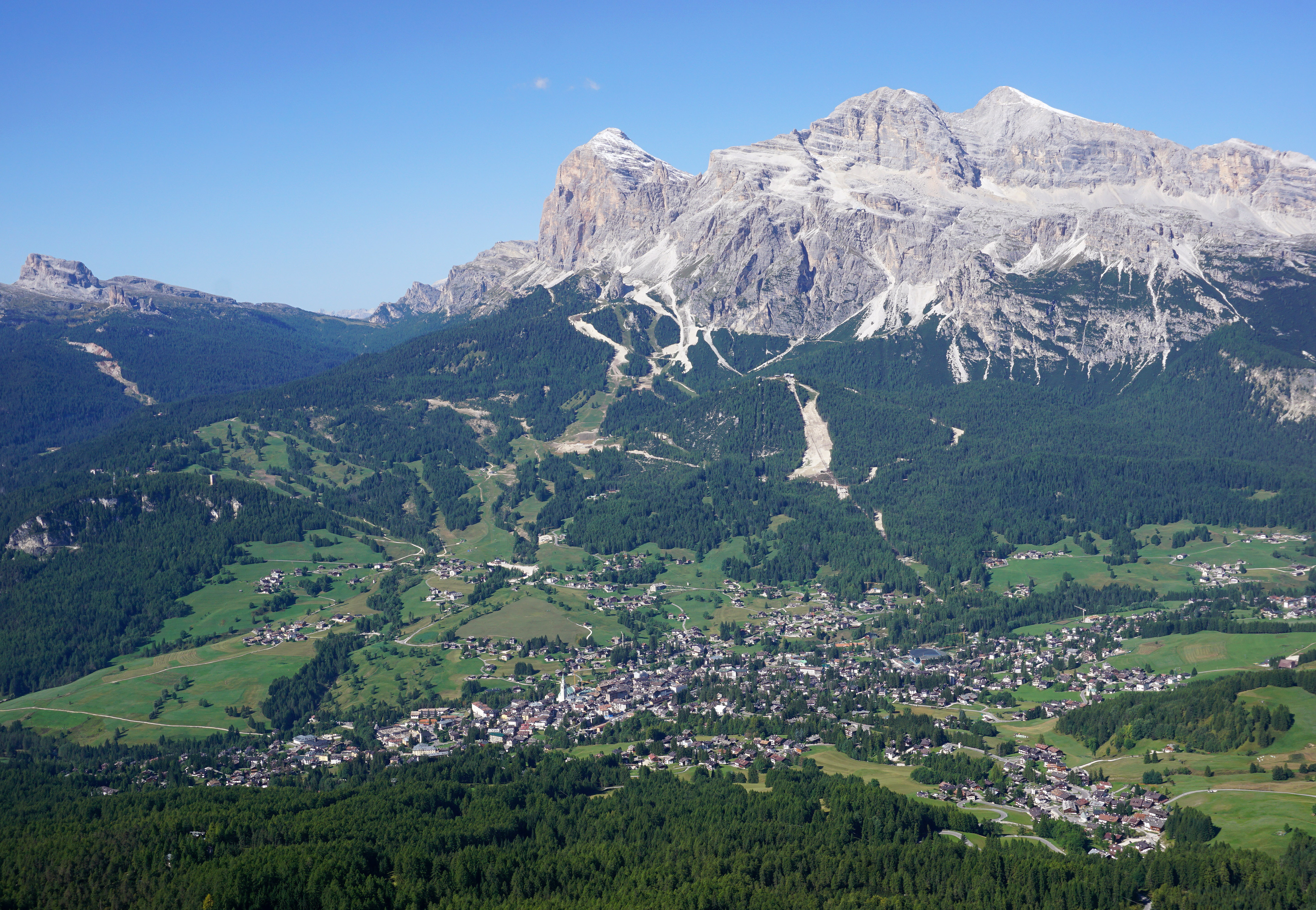
- Location: Olimpia - Tofana
- Vertical: 902 m (2,959 ft)
- Top elevation: 2,282 m (7,487 ft)
- Base elevation: 1,380 m (4,528 ft)

The men's alpine skiing downhill event of the 1956 Winter Olympics at Cortina d'Ampezzo, Italy, was held on Friday, 3 February, at 11:00 a.m. The starting elevation on the Olimpia - Tofana run was 2,282 m (7,487 ft) above sea level and the course length was 3.461 km (2.15 mi), with a vertical drop of 902 m (2,959 ft) and just fifteen control gates.

Defending Olympic champion Zeno Colò of Italy had retired two years earlier and defending world champion Christian Pravda of Austria did not participate.

It was the final alpine event of the games and the third straight victory for Toni Sailer of Austria. His average speed was 72.355 km/h (45.0 mph), with an average vertical descent rate of 5.238 m/s (17.2 ft/s).

It was the third appearance of the downhill event at the Winter Games, which debuted in 1948. Seventy-five alpine skiers from 27 nations competed.

== Results ==
Friday, 3 February 1956

Place	Bib	Competitor	Time	Difference
1st place, gold medalist(s)	14	Toni Sailer (AUT)	2:52.2	—
2nd place, silver medalist(s)	25	Raymond Fellay (SUI)	2:55.7	+3.5
3rd place, bronze medalist(s)	20	Anderl Molterer (AUT)	2:56.2	+4.0
4	21	Roger Staub (SUI)	2:57.1	+4.9
5	7	Hans-Peter Lanig (EUA)	2:59.8	+7.6
6	11	Gino Burrini (ITA)	3:00.2	+8.0
7	46	Kurt Hennrich (TCH)	3:01.5	+9.3
8	17	Charles Bozon (FRA)	3:01.9	+9.7
9	23	Bruno Burrini (ITA)	3:02.4	+10.2
10	9	Stig Sollander (SWE)	3:05.4	+13.2
11	4	Buddy Werner (USA)	3:05.8	+13.6
12	31	Sepp Behr (EUA)	3:07.7	+15.5
13	16	Hans Forrer (SUI)	3:08.0	+15.8
14	35	Asle Sjåstad (NOR)	3:08.8	+16.6
15	12	Andrzej Gąsienica Roj (POL)	3:09.3	+17.1
16	32	Aleksandr Filatov (URS)	3:16.6	+24.4
17	38	Evžen Čermák (TCH)	3:18.0	+25.8
18	62	Georgi Dimitrov (BUL)	3:18.1	+25.9
19	29	Karl Zillibiller (EUA)	3:21.6	+29.4
20	1	Pepi Schwaiger (EUA)	3:22.2	+30.0
21	15	Viktor Talyanov (URS)	3:26.5	+34.3
22	55	Franc Cvenkelj (YUG)	3:28.5	+36.3
23	50	Kalevi Häkkinen (FIN)	3:29.2	+37.0
24	60	Georgi Varoshkin (BUL)	3:30.0	+37.8
25	33	André Bertrand (CAN)	3:31.2	+39.0
26	58	Franz Beck (LIE)	3:36.8	+44.6
27	48	Petar Ivanov Angelov (BUL)	3:38.5	+46.3
28	44	Susumu Sugiyama (JPN)	3:39.1	+46.9
29	36	Ludvig Dornig (YUG)	3:41.1	+48.9
30	87	Charlach Mackintosh (GBR)	3:41.4	+49.2
31	84	Nicolae Pandrea (ROU)	3:46.5	+54.3
32	42	Lars Mattsson (SWE)	3:50.4	+58.2
33	63	Muzaffer Demirhan (TUR)	3:52.2	+1:00.0
34	45	Nigel Gardner (GBR)	4:00.7	+1:08.5
35	54	Bill Day (AUS)	4:02.0	+1:09.8
36	53	Francisco Viladomat (ESP)	4:02.1	+1:09.9
37	91	Luis Molné (ESP)	4:08.9	+1:16.7
38	89	Denis Feron (BEL)	4:16.6	+1:24.4
39	72	Mahmoud Beiglou (IRI)	4:22.0	+1:29.8
40	85	Leopold Schädler (LIE)	4:23.7	+1:31.5
41	79	Vicente Vera (CHI)	4:25.4	+1:33.2
42	69	Ibrahim Geagea (LIB)	4:33.1	+1:40.9
43	81	Jean Keyrouz (LIB)	4:57.6	+2:05.4
44	77	Benik Amirian (IRI)	5:02.7	+2:10.5
45	73	Max von Hohenlohe (LIE)	5:15.8	+2:23.6
46	90	Aris Vatimbella (GRE)	5:44.2	+2:52.0
47	92	Christos Papageorgiou (GRE)	8:03.2	+5:11.0
—	2	Josl Rieder (AUT)	DSQ	
—	3	Ralph Miller (USA)	DSQ	
—	5	Lino Zecchini (ITA)	DSQ	
—	6	William Beck (USA)	DSQ	
—	8	Walter Schuster (AUT)	DSQ	
—	10	Chiharu Igaya (JPN)	DSQ	
—	13	René Collet (FRA)	DSQ	
—	18	Adrien Duvillard (FRA)	DSQ	
—	22	André Simond (FRA)	DSQ	
—	24	Andreas Rüedi (SUI)	DSQ	
—	30	Jan Zarycki (POL)	DSQ	
—	37	Paride Milianti (ITA)	DSQ	
—	39	Marvin Melville (USA)	DSQ	
—	43	Kåre Opdal (NOR)	DSQ	
—	47	Vladimír Krajňák (TCH)	DSQ	
—	49	Trygve Berge (NOR)	DSQ	
—	51	Sergey Shustov (URS)	DSQ	
—	56	Osman Yüce (TUR)	DSQ	
—	57	Jože Ilija (YUG)	DSQ	
—	59	Jaroslav Bogdálek (TCH)	DSQ	
—	61	Pentti Alonen (FIN)	DSQ	
—	64	Gheorghe Cristoloveanu (ROU)	DSQ	
—	65	Gennady Chertishchev (URS)	DSQ	
—	71	Robin Brock-Hollinshead (GBR)	DSQ	
—	74	Hermann Kindle (LIE)	DSQ	
—	80	Jaime Talens (ESP)	DSQ	
—	86	Reza Bazargan (IRI)	DSQ	
—	93	Douglas Mackintosh (GBR)	DSQ	
