= Great Britain at the 1956 Winter Olympics =

- Flag of the United Kingdom
- IOC code: GBR (GRB used at these Games)
- NOC: British Olympic Association

in Cortina d'Ampezzo
- Competitors: 41 (31 men, 10 women) in 5 sports
- Flag bearer: Stuart Parkinson (bobsleigh)
- Medals: Gold 0 Silver 0 Bronze 0 Total 0

Winter Olympics appearances (overview)
- 1924; 1928; 1932; 1936; 1948; 1952; 1956; 1960; 1964; 1968; 1972; 1976; 1980; 1984; 1988; 1992; 1994; 1998; 2002; 2006; 2010; 2014; 2018; 2022; 2026

The United Kingdom of Great Britain and Northern Ireland competed as Great Britain at the 1956 Winter Olympics in Cortina d'Ampezzo, Italy.

== Alpine skiing ==
Men

Athlete	Event	Race 1		Race 2		Total	
Athlete	Event	Time	Rank	Time	Rank	Time	Rank
Douglas Mackintosh	Downhill					DSQ	–
Robin Brock-Hollinshead	Downhill					DSQ	–
Nigel Gardner	Downhill					4:00.7	34
Charlach Mackintosh	Downhill					3:41.4	30
Robin Hooper	Giant Slalom					4:02.2	66
Noel Harrison	Giant Slalom					4:00.1	64
Nigel Gardner	Giant Slalom					3:51.8	58
Sandy Whitelaw	Giant Slalom					3:49.4	56
Peter Torrens	Slalom	DSQ	–	–	–	DSQ	–
Sandy Whitelaw	Slalom	DSQ	–	–	–	DSQ	–
Noel Harrison	Slalom	2:14.7 (+0:05)	50	2:36.0	45	4:50.7	47
Peter Seilern	Slalom	2:08.0	48	2:46.7	53	4:54.7	48

Women

Athlete	Event	Race 1		Race 2		Total	
Athlete	Event	Time	Rank	Time	Rank	Time	Rank
Jeanne Sandford	Downhill					2:15.1	43
Renate Holmes	Downhill					2:05.0	41
Zandra Nowell	Downhill					1:59.0	35
Jeanne Sandford	Giant Slalom					DSQ	–
Jocelyn Wardrop-Moore	Giant Slalom					2:39.8	42
Renate Holmes	Giant Slalom					2:19.0	38
Adeline Pryor	Giant Slalom					2:03.1	21
Jocelyn Wardrop-Moore	Slalom	1:54.4	39	1:26.0	32	3:20.4	35
Adeline Pryor	Slalom	1:35.2	37	DNS	–	DNF	–
Renate Holmes	Slalom	1:15.0	31	1:40.9	35	2:55.9	34
Zandra Nowell	Slalom	57.5	5	1:28.3	33	2:25.8	25

== Bobsleigh ==
Sled	Athletes	Event	Run 1		Run 2		Run 3		Run 4		Total	
Sled	Athletes	Event	Time	Rank	Time	Rank	Time	Rank	Time	Rank	Time	Rank
GBR-1	Clifford Schellenberg; John Rainforth	Two-man	1:24.52	3	1:26.57	16	1:25.88	11	1:26.39	15	5:43.36	11
GBR-2	Stuart Parkinson; Christopher Williams	Two-man	1:25.63	10	1:24.53	9	1:26.73	16	1:25.94	11	5:42.83	10

Sled	Athletes	Event	Run 1		Run 2		Run 3		Run 4		Total	
Sled	Athletes	Event	Time	Rank	Time	Rank	Time	Rank	Time	Rank	Time	Rank
GBR-1	Keith Schellenberg; Rollo Brandt; Ralph Raffles; John Rainforth	Four-man	1:21.39	19	1:18.73	6	1:20.42	10	1:21.58	16	5:22.12	12
GBR-2	Stuart Parkinson; John Read; Christopher Williams; Rodney Mann	Four-man	1:20.72	15	1:19.92	11	1:22.51	19	1:20.58	12	5:23.73	17

== Cross-country skiing ==
Men

Event	Athlete	Race	
Event	Athlete	Time	Rank
15 km	Aubrey Fielder	59:59	60
15 km	John Moore	59:31	58
15 km	Andrew Morgan	59:27	57
15 km	Maurice Gover	58:58	56
30 km	Thomas Cairney	2'13:41	51
30 km	James Spencer	2'10:32	49
30 km	John Moore	2'08:58	47
30 km	Andrew Morgan	2'03:55	45
50 km	Richard Aylmer	4'11:40	30
50 km	Toby Graham	3'48:17	29
50 km	Thomas Cairney	3'44:54	28

Men's 4 × 10 km relay

Athletes	Race	
Athletes	Time	Rank
Andrew Morgan; James Spencer; Aubrey Fielder; Maurice Gover	2'38:44	14

== Figure skating ==
Men

Athlete	CF	FS	Points	Places	Rank
Michael Booker	6	6	154.26	53.5	6

Women

Athlete	CF	FS	Points	Places	Rank
Dianne Peach	13	13	144.75	151	14
Erica Batchelor	9	12	149.67	116	11
Yvonne Sugden	4	9	156.62	53	4

Pairs

Athletes	Points	Places	Rank
Patricia Krau; Rodney Ward	9.86	93	11
Joyce Coates; Anthony Holles	10.00	88	10

== Speed skating ==
Men

Event	Athlete	Race	
Event	Athlete	Time	Rank
500 m	John Hearn	45.9	45
500 m	Alex Connell	45.2	44
500 m	Johnny Cronshey	42.9	21
1500 m	Alex Connell	2:23.0	50
1500 m	John Hearn	2:17.5	33
1500 m	Johnny Cronshey	2:15.0	19
5000 m	Alex Connell	8:42.5	42
5000 m	John Hearn	8:21.4	26
5000 m	Johnny Cronshey	8:10.1	15
10,000 m	John Hearn	17:27.6	20
10,000 m	Johnny Cronshey	17:05.6	11
