= United States at the 1956 Winter Olympics =

- Flag of the United States
- IOC code: USA
- NOC: United States Olympic Committee

in Cortina d'Ampezzo
- Competitors: 67 (57 men, 10 women) in 4 sports
- Flag bearer: James Bickford (bobsleigh)
- Medals Ranked 6th: Gold 2 Silver 3 Bronze 2 Total 7

Winter Olympics appearances (overview)
- 1924; 1928; 1932; 1936; 1948; 1952; 1956; 1960; 1964; 1968; 1972; 1976; 1980; 1984; 1988; 1992; 1994; 1998; 2002; 2006; 2010; 2014; 2018; 2022; 2026

The United States competed at the 1956 Winter Olympics in Cortina d'Ampezzo, Italy.

== Medalists ==
American figure skaters swept the men's singles competition, taking all three medals. The following U.S. competitors won medals at the games. In the by discipline sections below, medalists' names are bolded.

| Medal | Name | Sport | Event | Date |
|---|---|---|---|---|
| Gold | Hayes Alan Jenkins | Figure skating | Men's singles | February 1 |
| Gold | Tenley Albright | Figure skating | Women's singles | February 2 |
| Silver | Ronald Robertson | Figure skating | Men's singles | February 1 |
| Silver | Carol Heiss | Figure skating | Women's singles | February 2 |
| Silver | United States men's national ice hockey team: Wendell Anderson; Wellington Burtnett; Eugene Campbell; Gordon Christian; Bill Cleary; Richard Dougherty; Willard Ikola; John Matchefts; John Mayasich; Daniel McKinnon; Richard Meredith; Weldon Olson; Jack Petroske; Kenneth Purpur; Don Rigazio; Richard Rodenheiser; Ed Sampson | Ice hockey | Men's tournament | February 4 |
| Bronze | David Jenkins | Figure skating | Men's singles | February 1 |
| Bronze | Charles Butler; William Dodge; James Lamy; Arthur Tyler | Bobsleigh | Four-man | February 4 |

Medals by sport
| Sport | 1st place, gold medalist(s) | 2nd place, silver medalist(s) | 3rd place, bronze medalist(s) | Total |
| Figure skating | 2 | 2 | 1 | **5** |
| Ice hockey | 0 | 1 | 0 | **1** |
| Bobsleigh | 0 | 0 | 1 | **1** |
| Total | 2 | 3 | 2 | 7 |

Medals by gender
| Gender | 1st place, gold medalist(s) | 2nd place, silver medalist(s) | 3rd place, bronze medalist(s) | Total | Percentage |
| Male | 1 | 2 | 2 | **5** | 71.4% |
| Female | 1 | 1 | 0 | **2** | 28.6% |
| Total | 2 | 3 | 2 | 7 | 100% |

== Alpine skiing ==
Men

| Athlete | Event | Run 1 | | Run 2 | | Total | |
| Athlete | Event | Time | Rank | Time | Rank | Time | Rank |
|---|---|---|---|---|---|---|---|
| Bill Beck | Downhill | —N/a | | | | DSQ | |
| Marvin Melville | Downhill | —N/a | | | | DSQ | |
| Ralph Miller | Downhill | —N/a | | | | DSQ | |
| Buddy Werner | Downhill | —N/a | | | | 3:05.8 | 11 |
| Tom Corcoran | Giant slalom | —N/a | | | | 3:16.0 | 14 |
| Brooks Dodge | Giant slalom | —N/a | | | | 3:16.4 | 15 |
| Ralph Miller | Giant slalom | —N/a | | | | 3:15.8 | 13 |
| Buddy Werner | Giant slalom | —N/a | | | | 3:21.5 | 21 |
| Tom Corcoran | Slalom | 1:37.1 | 27 | 2:04.2 | 16 | 3:41.3 | 19 |
| Brooks Dodge | Slalom | 1:27.6 | 3 | 1:54.2 | 8 | 3:21.8 | 4 |
| Ralph Miller | Slalom | 1:34.0 | 18 | 2:13.8 | 26 | 3:47.8 | 22 |
| Buddy Werner | Slalom | DSQ | | | | | |

Women

| Athlete | Event | Run 1 | | Run 2 | | Total | |
| Athlete | Event | Time | Rank | Time | Rank | Time | Rank |
|---|---|---|---|---|---|---|---|
| Andrea Mead Lawrence | Downhill | —N/a | | | | 1:55.2 | 30 |
| Penny Pitou | Downhill | —N/a | | | | 1:58.9 | 34 |
| Dorothy Surgenor | Downhill | —N/a | | | | 2:01.5 | 38 |
| Gladys Werner | Downhill | —N/a | | | | 1:49.6 | 10 |
| Andrea Mead Lawrence | Giant slalom | —N/a | | | | 1:58.3 | 4 |
| Penny Pitou | Giant slalom | —N/a | | | | 2:10.4 | 34 |
| Betsy Snite | Giant slalom | —N/a | | | | DSQ | |
| Gladys Werner | Giant slalom | —N/a | | | | 2:04.0 | 22 |
| Andrea Mead Lawrence | Slalom | 1:10.5 | 27 | 1:15.3 | 25 | 2:25.8 | 25 |
| Penny Pitou | Slalom | 1:26.2 | 33 | 1:16.3 | 27 | 2:42.5 | 31 |
| Dorothy Surgenor | Slalom | 1:09.1 | 25 | 1:08.2 | 22 | 2:17.3 | 20 |
| Gladys Werner | Slalom | 1:13.9 | 28 | 1:16.2 | 26 | 2:30.1 | 27 |

== Bobsleigh ==
| Athlete | Event | Run 1 | | Run 2 | | Run 3 | | Run 4 | | Total | |
| Athlete | Event | Time | Rank | Time | Rank | Time | Rank | Time | Rank | Time | Rank |
|---|---|---|---|---|---|---|---|---|---|---|---|
| Arthur Tyler; Edgar Seymour | Two-man | 1:25.41 | 9 | 1:23.77 | 3 | 1:24.44 | 5 | 1:26.46 | 17 | 5:40.08 | 6 |
| Waightman Washbond; Piet Biesiadecki | Two-man | 1:24.82 | 8 | 1:24.15 | 7 | 1:24.78 | 7 | 1:24.41 | 3 | 5:38.16 | 5 |
| James Bickford; Donald Jacques; Lawrence McKillip; Hubert Miller | Four-man | 1:20.97 | 17 | 1:22.47 | 20 | 1:21.22 | 16 | 1:20.50 | 11 | 5:25.16 | 19 |
| Arthur Tyler; William Dodge; Charles Butler; James Lamy | Four-man | 1:17.75 | 3 | 1:17.87 | 3 | 1:18.25 | 3 | 1:18.52 | 3 | 5:12.39 | 3rd place, bronze medalist(s) |

== Cross-country skiing ==
| Athlete | Event | Time | Rank |
|---|---|---|---|
| Larry Damon | Men's 15 km | 57:18 | 51 |
| Mack Miller | Men's 15 km | 56:08 | 41 |
| Buck Levy | Men's 30 km | 2:10:56 | 50 |
| Mack Miller | Men's 30 km | 2:00:38 | 38 |
| Marvin Crawford; Larry Damon; Theodore Farwell; Mack Miller | Men's 4 × 10 km relay | 2:32:04 | 12 |

== Figure skating ==
Individual

| Athlete | Event | CF | FS | Total | | |
| Athlete | Event | Rank | Rank | Points | Places | Rank |
|---|---|---|---|---|---|---|
| David Jenkins | Men's singles | 3 | 3 | 162.82 | 27 | 3rd place, bronze medalist(s) |
| Hayes Alan Jenkins | Men's singles | 1 | 2 | 166.43 | 13 | 1st place, gold medalist(s) |
| Ronald Robertson | Men's singles | 2 | 1 | 165.79 | 16 | 2nd place, silver medalist(s) |
| Tenley Albright | Ladies' singles | 1 | 1 | 169.67 | 12 | 1st place, gold medalist(s) |
| Carol Heiss | Ladies' singles | 2 | 2 | 168.02 | 21 | 2nd place, silver medalist(s) |
| Catherine Machado | Ladies' singles | 10 | 3 | 153.48 | 86.5 | 8 |

Mixed

| Athlete | Event | Points | Places | Rank |
|---|---|---|---|---|
| Lucille Ash; Sully Kothmann | Pairs | 10.63 | 59.5 | 7 |
| Carole Ann Ormaca; Robin Greiner | Pairs | 10.71 | 56 | 5 |

== Ice hockey ==
Summary

| Team | Event | First round | | | Consolation round | | | Medal round | | | | | |
| Team | Event | Opposition Score | Opposition Score | Rank | Opposition Score | Opposition Score | Opposition Score | Opposition Score | Opposition Score | Opposition Score | Opposition Score | Opposition Score | Rank |
|---|---|---|---|---|---|---|---|---|---|---|---|---|---|
| United States men | Men's tournament | Czechoslovakia; L 3–4 | Poland; W 4–0 | 2 Q | Bye | | | Germany; W 7–2 | Canada; W 4–1 | Sweden; W 6–1 | Soviet Union; L 0–4 | Czechoslovakia; W 9–4 | 2nd place, silver medalist(s) |

First round
Top two teams advanced to Medal Round.

| Rank | Team | Pld | W | L | T | GF | GA | Pts |
|---|---|---|---|---|---|---|---|---|
| 1 | Czechoslovakia | 2 | 2 | 0 | 0 | 12 | 6 | 4 |
| 2 | United States | 2 | 1 | 1 | 0 | 7 | 4 | 2 |
| 3 | Poland | 2 | 0 | 2 | 0 | 3 | 12 | 0 |

- Czechoslovakia 4-3 USA
- USA 4-0 Poland

Medal round

| Rank | Team | Pld | W | L | T | GF | GA | Pts |
|---|---|---|---|---|---|---|---|---|
| 1 | Soviet Union | 5 | 5 | 0 | 0 | 25 | 5 | 10 |
| 2 | United States | 5 | 4 | 1 | 0 | 26 | 12 | 8 |
| 3 | Canada | 5 | 3 | 2 | 0 | 23 | 11 | 6 |
| 4 | Sweden | 5 | 1 | 3 | 1 | 10 | 17 | 3 |
| 5 | Czechoslovakia | 5 | 1 | 4 | 0 | 20 | 30 | 2 |
| 6 | Germany | 5 | 0 | 4 | 1 | 6 | 35 | 1 |

- USA 7-2 Germany (UTG)
- USA 4-1 Canada
- USA 6-1 Sweden
- USSR 4-0 USA
- USA 9-4 Czechoslovakia

== Nordic combined ==
| Athlete | Event | Ski Jumping | | | | Cross-country | | | Total | |
| Athlete | Event | Jump 1 | Jump 2 | Points | Rank | Time | Points | Rank | Points | Rank |
|---|---|---|---|---|---|---|---|---|---|---|
| Marvin Crawford | Individual | 97.5 | 99.0 | 196.5 | 17 | 1:02:24 | 216.400 | 26 | 412.900 | 23 |
| Theodore Farwell | Individual | 88.5 | 85.0 | 173.5 | 33 | 1:01:21 | 220.500 | 22 | 394.000 | 30 |
| Buck Levy | Individual | 80.5 | 81.5 | 162.0 | 36 | 1:05:42 | 203.600 | 33 | 365.600 | 35 |
| Charles Tremblay | Individual | 91.0 | 91.0 | 182.0 | 30 | 1:07:40 | 196.000 | 34 | 378.000 | 34 |

== Ski jumping ==
| Athlete | Event | Jump 1 | | | Jump 2 | | | Total | |
| Athlete | Event | Distance | Points | Rank | Distance | Points | Rank | Points | Rank |
|---|---|---|---|---|---|---|---|---|---|
| Art Devlin | Normal hill | 74.0 | 98.5 | 24 | 72.5 | 96.0 | 23 | 194.5 | 21 |
| Willis Olson | Normal hill | 65.0 | 84.5 | 45 | 69.5 | 90.0 | 34 | 174.5 | 43 |
| Dick Rahoi | Normal hill | 71.5 | 86.0 | 42 | 78.0 fall | 72.0 | 50 | 158.0 | 51 |
| Roy Sherwood | Normal hill | 71.5 | 94.0 | 31 | 68.0 | 89.0 | 38 | 183.0 | 36 |

== Speed skating ==
| Athlete | Event | Time | Rank |
|---|---|---|---|
| Bill Carow | 500 m | 41.8 | 6 |
| Ken Henry | 500 m | 42.8 | 17 |
| Don McDermott | 500 m | 43.2 | 25 |
| Johnny Werket | 500 m | 42.4 | 11 |
| Don McDermott | 1500 m | 2:18.6 | 37 |
| Pat McNamara | 1500 m | 2:15.2 | 20 |
| Gene Sandvig | 1500 m | 2:17.1 | 30 |
| Johnny Werket | 1500 m | 2:16.1 | 25 |
| Chuck Burke | 5000 m | 8:47.4 | 43 |
| Art Longsjo | 5000 m | 8:40.0 | 40 |
| Pat McNamara | 5000 m | 8:10.6 | 17 |
| Gene Sandvig | 5000 m | 8:25.5 | 31 |
| Pat McNamara | 10,000 m | 17:45.6 | 27 |
