= Figure skating at the 1956 Winter Olympics – Ladies' singles =

Figure skating at the Olympics

Ladies' singles at the VII Olympic Winter Games
- Venue: Stadio olimpico del ghiaccio
- Dates: 30 January-2 February 1956
- Competitors: 21 from 11 nations

Medalists
| 1st place, gold medalist(s) | | Tenley Albright; United States |
| 2nd place, silver medalist(s) | | Carol Heiss; United States |
| 3rd place, bronze medalist(s) | | Ingrid Wendl; Austria |

The women's figure skating competition at the 1956 Winter Olympics took place at the Olympic Ice Stadium in Cortina d'Ampezzo, Italy. The competition was held on 30–31 January and 2 February 1956. Twenty-one women from eleven countries participated in the competition. The event was dominated by the American skaters and who won gold and silver. Tenley Albright, who overcame a significant injury two weeks before the start of the competition, was the Olympic champion.

== Competition ==
The event was held outdoors at the Ice Stadium in Cortina d'Ampezzo, the host city for the Games. This would be the last time that the figure skating events were held outdoors at an Olympic Games. The Ice Stadium was the focal point of the Games. It was used not only for figure skating but also for the opening and closing ceremonies. It was built to accommodate 6,000–7,000 people. Temporary seating was added for the figure skating competition that swelled the stadium's capacity to 14,000 people. The ladies' competition was the first figure skating event held at the Games. It was followed by the men's competition and then the pairs. Ice dancing had yet to become an Olympic sport in 1956.

The competition was broken down into two disciplines. The first was a compulsory figures competition, which counted for 60% of the score. This was done on 30 January, with the competition beginning in such a heavy snowstorm that it was difficult for the judges to see the skaters' tracings. After the first day of competition Tenley Albright had the lead with 9 of 11 judges' first-place ordinals, with Carol Heiss second.

The second discipline was a free skating program, which counted for 40% of the final score. This final program was performed on 2 February. In the second day of competition Albright edged out Heiss by 1.6 points to claim the gold medal.

Albright won the event despite a serious leg injury sustained just weeks before the Olympics. While skating in practice Albright fell when her skate hit a rut in the ice. Her left skate blade sliced her right ankle to the bone, severing a vein. She also had to overcome polio, which she contracted in 1946. Carol Heiss won the silver medal. She later won gold at the 1960 Winter Olympics in Squaw Valley, and married Hayes Jenkins, the men's champion at the 1956 Games. Ingrid Wendl from Austria won the bronze medal, the only Olympic medal of her career.

== Results ==
| Rank | Name | Nation | CF | FS | Points | Places |
|---|---|---|---|---|---|---|
| 1 | Tenley Albright | United States | 1 | 1 | 169.67 | 12 |
| 2 | Carol Heiss | United States | 2 | 2 | 168.02 | 21 |
| 3 | Ingrid Wendl | Austria | 3 | 5 | 159.44 | 39 |
| 4 | Yvonne Sugden | Great Britain | 4 | 9 | 156.62 | 53 |
| 5 | Hanna Eigel | Austria | 5 | 4 | 157.15 | 52 |
| 6 | Carole Jane Pachl | Canada | 6 | 8 | 154.74 | 73 |
| 7 | Hanna Walter | Austria | 8 | 7 | 153.89 | 83.5 |
| 8 | Catherine Machado | United States | 10 | 3 | 153.48 | 86.5 |
| 9 | Ann Johnston | Canada | 7 | 10 | 152.56 | 94 |
| 10 | Rosi Pettinger | United Team of Germany | 11 | 6 | 152.04 | 101 |
| 11 | Erica Batchelor | Great Britain | 9 | 12 | 149.67 | 116 |
| 12 | Sjoukje Dijkstra | Netherlands | 12 | 15 | 145.80 | 140 |
| 13 | Joan Haanappel | Netherlands | 14 | 11 | 145.85 | 145.5 |
| 14 | Dianne Carol Peach | Great Britain | 13 | 13 | 144.75 | 151 |
| 15 | Fiorella Negro | Italy | 16 | 14 | 142.31 | 168.5 |
| 16 | Karin Borner | Switzerland | 15 | 16 | 141.69 | 171 |
| 17 | Maryvonne Huet | France | 17 | 19 | 138.30 | 194 |
| 18 | Alice Fischer | Switzerland | 18 | 20 | 137.69 | 203 |
| 19 | Alice Lundström | Sweden | 19 | 18 | 136.34 | 206 |
| 20 | Jindra Kramperová | Czechoslovakia | 21 | 17 | 136.67 | 209 |
| 21 | Manuela Angeli | Italy | 20 | 21 | 133.51 | 222 |

== See also ==
- List of IOC country codes
- 1956 Winter Olympics
