= Sweden at the 1956 Winter Olympics =

- IOC code: SWE (SVE used at these Games)
- NOC: Swedish Olympic Committee
- Website: www.sok.se (in Swedish and English)

in Cortina d'Ampezzo
- Competitors: 58 (50 men, 8 women) in 8 sports
- Flag bearers: Bror Östman, Ski Jumping
- Medals Ranked 6th: Gold 2 Silver 4 Bronze 4 Total 10

Winter Olympics appearances (overview)
- 1924; 1928; 1932; 1936; 1948; 1952; 1956; 1960; 1964; 1968; 1972; 1976; 1980; 1984; 1988; 1992; 1994; 1998; 2002; 2006; 2010; 2014; 2018; 2022; 2026

Sweden competed at the 1956 Winter Olympics in Cortina d'Ampezzo, Italy.

== Medalists ==
Medal	Name	Sport	Event
Gold	Sixten Jernberg	Cross-country skiing	Men's 50 km
Gold	Sigvard Ericsson	Speed skating	Men's 10 000 m
Silver	Sixten Jernberg	Cross-country skiing	Men's 15 km
Silver	Sixten Jernberg	Cross-country skiing	Men's 30 km
Silver	Bengt Eriksson	Nordic combined	Men's individual
Silver	Sigvard Ericsson	Speed skating	Men's 5000m
Bronze	Stig Sollander	Alpine skiing	Men's slalom
Bronze	Lennart Larsson; Gunnar Samuelsson; Per-Erik Larsson; Sixten Jernberg	Cross-country skiing	Men's 4 × 10 km relay
Bronze	Sonja Ruthström-Edström	Cross-country skiing	Women's 10 km
Bronze	Irma Johansson; Anna-Lisa Eriksson; Sonja Ruthström-Edström	Cross-country skiing	Women's 3 x 5 km relay

== Alpine skiing ==
Men

Athlete	Event	Race 1		Race 2		Total	
Athlete	Event	Time	Rank	Time	Rank	Time	Rank
Lars Mattsson	Downhill					3:50.4	32
Stig Sollander	Downhill					3:05.4	10
Hans Olofsson	Giant Slalom					DSQ	–
Olle Dalman	Giant Slalom					3:24.9	29
Åke Nilsson	Giant Slalom					3:21.4	20
Stig Sollander	Giant Slalom					3:17.1	16
Hans Olofsson	Slalom	DSQ	–	–	–	DSQ	–
Åke Nilsson	Slalom	1:39.8	29	1:57.5	11	3:37.3	14
Olle Dalman	Slalom	1:34.2	20	2:03.4 (+0:05)	15	3:37.6	15
Stig Sollander	Slalom	1:29.2	5	1:51.0	3	3:20.2	3rd place, bronze medalist(s)

Women

Athlete	Event	Race 1		Race 2		Total	
Athlete	Event	Time	Rank	Time	Rank	Time	Rank
Vivi-Anne Wassdahl	Downhill					2:08.0	42
Ingrid Englund	Downhill					1:51.8	18
Eivor Berglund	Downhill					1:51.6	15
Vivi-Anne Wassdahl	Giant Slalom					2:06.4	31
Eivor Berglund	Giant Slalom					2:04.9	26
Ingrid Englund	Giant Slalom					2:04.5	25
Eivor Berglund	Slalom	DSQ	–	–	–	DSQ	–
Ingrid Englund	Slalom	DSQ	–	–	–	DSQ	–
Vivi-Anne Wassdahl	Slalom	1:31.2 (+0:05)	35	59.6	8	2:30.8	28

== Bobsleigh ==
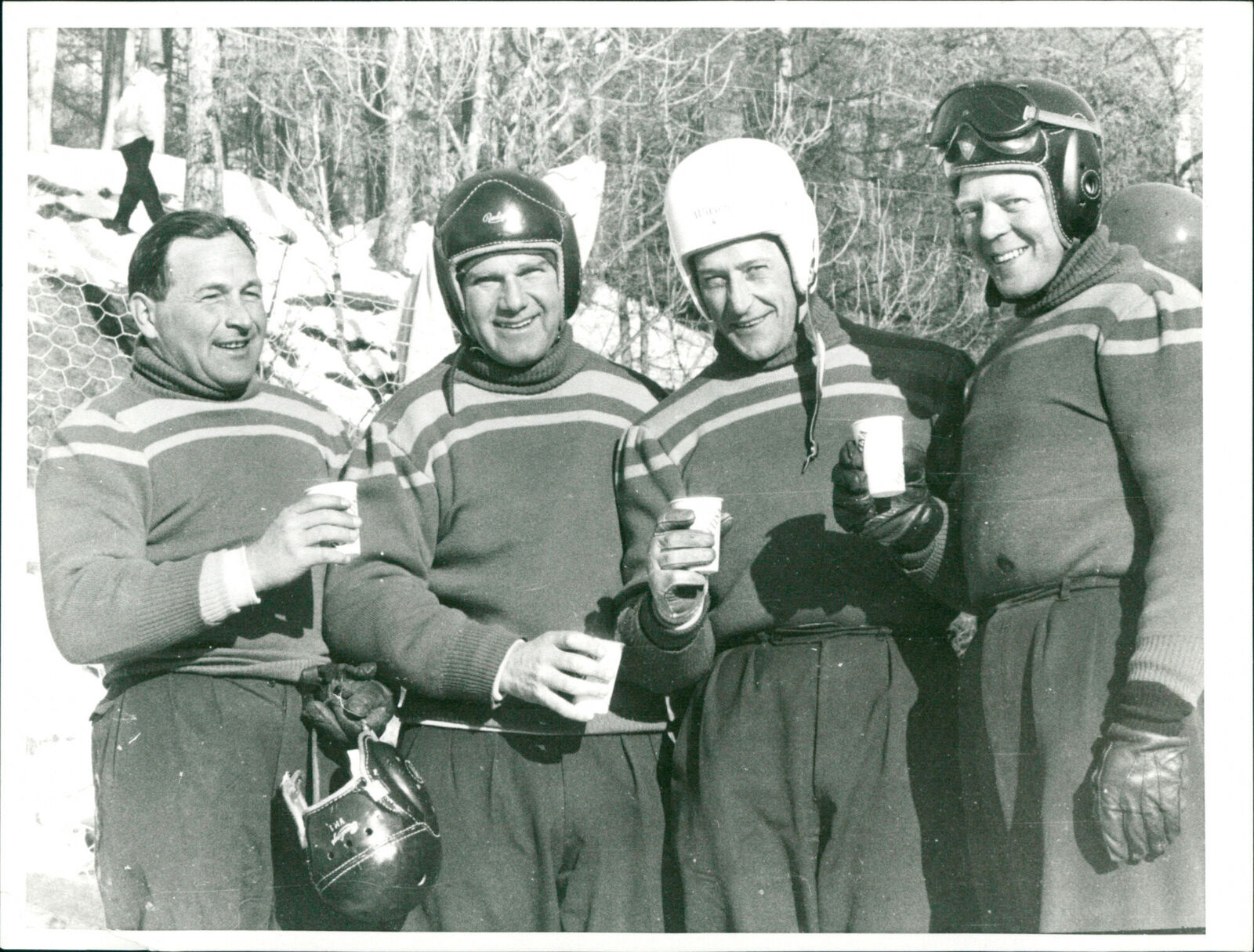
Olympics in Cortina. The Swedish four-man bobsleigh team strengthens its side with a cup of hot chocolate after the races. From left: Gunnar Åhs, Ebbe Wallén, Sune Skagerling and Olle Axelsson.

Sled	Athletes	Event	Run 1		Run 2		Run 3		Run 4		Total	
Sled	Athletes	Event	Time	Rank	Time	Rank	Time	Rank	Time	Rank	Time	Rank
SWE-1	Olle Axelsson; Tryggve Sundström	Two-man	1:27.15	15	1:27.82	22	1:26.01	12	1:25.67	9	5:46.65	17
SWE-2	Sven Erbs; Walter Aronson	Two-man	2:29.66	23	1:25.01	11	DNF	–	–	–	DNF	–

Sled	Athletes	Event	Run 1		Run 2		Run 3		Run 4		Total	
Sled	Athletes	Event	Time	Rank	Time	Rank	Time	Rank	Time	Rank	Time	Rank
SWE-1	Olle Axelsson; Ebbe Wallén; Sune Skagerling; Gunnar Åhs	Four-man	1:18.95	8	1:19.98	12	1:22.75	20	1:21.86	18	5:23.54	16
SWE-2	Kjell Holmström; Sven Erbs; Walter Aronson; Jan Lapidoth	Four-man	1:20.58	14	1:20.32	15	1:21.15	15	1:21.13	14	5:23.18	13

== Cross-country skiing ==
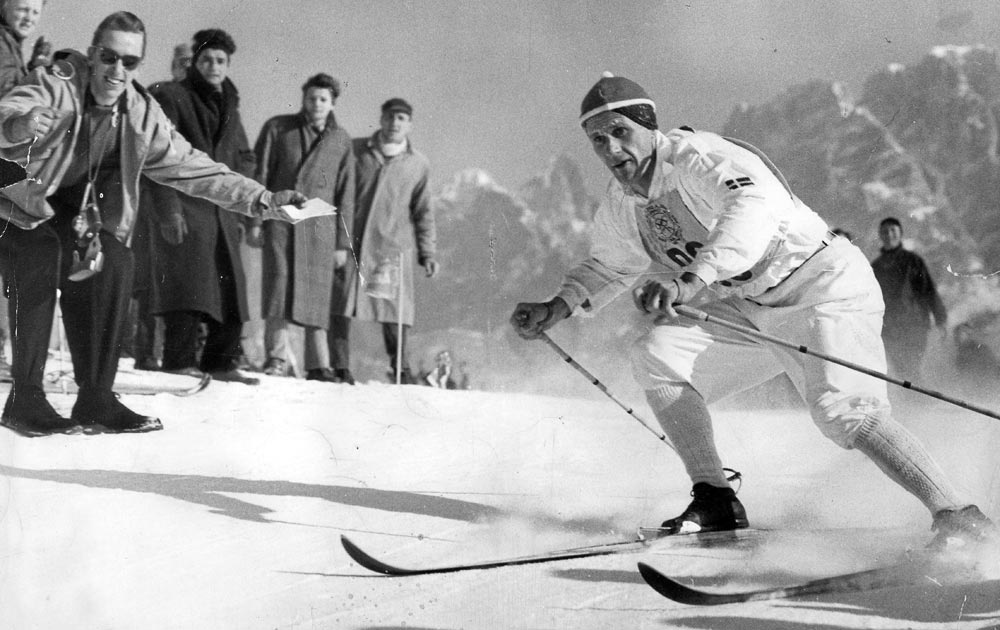
Sixten Jernberg at the 1956 Winter Olympics

Men

Event	Athlete	Race	
Event	Athlete	Time	Rank
15 km	Gunnar Samuelsson	52:39	15
15 km	Per-Erik Larsson	51:44	12
15 km	Lennart Larsson	51:03	8
15 km	Sixten Jernberg	50:14	2nd place, silver medalist(s)
30 km	Gunnar Samuelsson	1'48:23	11
30 km	Lennart Larsson	1'46:56	8
30 km	Per-Erik Larsson	1'46:51	7
30 km	Sixten Jernberg	1'44:30	2nd place, silver medalist(s)
50 km	Inge Limberg	3'10:19	12
50 km	Arthur Olsson	3'10:03	11
50 km	Sture Grahn	3'06:32	10
50 km	Sixten Jernberg	2'50:27	1st place, gold medalist(s)

Men's 4 × 10 km relay

Athletes	Race	
Athletes	Time	Rank
Lennart Larsson; Gunnar Samuelsson; Per-Erik Larsson; Sixten Jernberg	2'17:42	3rd place, bronze medalist(s)

Women

Event	Athlete	Race	
Event	Athlete	Time	Rank
10 km	Barbro Martinsson	41:04	14
10 km	Anna-Lisa Eriksson	40:56	13
10 km	Irma Johansson	40:20	7
10 km	Sonja Ruthström-Edström	38:23	3rd place, bronze medalist(s)

Women's 3 x 5 km relay

Athletes	Race	
Athletes	Time	Rank
Irma Johansson; Anna-Lisa Eriksson; Sonja Ruthström-Edström	1'09:48	3rd place, bronze medalist(s)

== Figure skating ==
Women

Athlete	CF	FS	Points	Places	Rank
Alice Lundström	19	18	136.34	206	19

== Ice hockey ==
Summary

Team	Event	First round			Final round / Consolation round					
Team	Event	Opposition Score	Opposition Score	Rank	Opposition Score	Opposition Score	Opposition Score	Opposition Score	Opposition Score	Rank
Sweden men's	Men's tournament	Soviet Union; L 1–5	Switzerland; W 6–5	2 Q MR	Soviet Union; L 1–4	Czechoslovakia; W 5–0	United States; L 1–6	Canada; L 2–6	Germany; T 1–1	4

=== Group C ===
Top two teams advanced to medal round.

Rank	Team	Pld	W	L	T	GF	GA	Pts
1	Soviet Union	2	2	0	0	15	4	4
2	Sweden	2	1	1	0	7	10	2
3	Switzerland	2	0	2	0	8	16	0

- USSR 5–1 Sweden
- Sweden 6–5 Switzerland

=== Games for 1st-6th places ===
Rank	Team	Pld	W	L	T	GF	GA	Pts
1	Soviet Union	5	5	0	0	25	5	10
2	United States	5	4	1	0	26	12	8
3	Canada	5	3	2	0	23	11	6
4	Sweden	5	1	3	1	10	17	3
5	Czechoslovakia	5	1	4	0	20	30	2
6	Germany	5	0	4	1	6	35	1

- USSR 4–1 Sweden
- Sweden 5–0 Czechoslovakia
- USA 6–1 Sweden
- Canada 6–2 Sweden
- Germany (UTG) 1–1 Sweden

Contestants; Lars Svensson; Yngve Casslind; Bertz Zetterberg; Lasse Björn; Åke Lassas; Vilgot Larsson; Ove Malmberg; Holger Nurmela; Sven Johansson; Sigurd Bröms; Hans Öberg; Ronald Pettersson; Nils Nilsson; Lars-Eric Lundvall; Stig Andersson-Tvilling; Hans Andersson-Tvilling; Stig Carlsson

== Nordic combined ==
Events:

- normal hill ski jumping (Three jumps, best two counted and shown here.)
- 15 km cross-country skiing

Athlete	Event	Ski Jumping				Cross-country			Total	
Athlete	Event	Distance 1	Distance 2	Points	Rank	Time	Points	Rank	Points	Rank
Bengt Eriksson	Individual	72.5	72.5	214.0	3	1'00:36	223.400	15	437.400	2nd place, silver medalist(s)

== Ski jumping ==
Athlete	Event	Jump 1			Jump 2			Total	
Athlete	Event	Distance	Points	Rank	Distance	Points	Rank	Points	Rank
Holger Karlsson	Normal hill	76.0 fall	71.5	51	77.5	104.5	10	176.0	41
Erik Styf	Normal hill	76.0	102.5	15	75.0 fall	66.5	51	169.0	44
Bror Östman	Normal hill	76.0	102.5	15	75.5	102.0	13	204.5	14
Sven Pettersson	Normal hill	81.0	109.5	5	81.5	110.5	5	220.0	5

== Speed skating ==
Men

Event	Athlete	Race	
Event	Athlete	Time	Rank
500 m	Gunnar Ström	44.7	42
500 m	Sigvard Ericsson	44.2	37
500 m	Bertil Eng	42.6	15
500 m	Bengt Malmsten	41.9	7
1500 m	Gunnar Ström	2:15.6	22
1500 m	Bengt Malmsten	2:14.6	17
1500 m	Bertil Eng	2:13.1	11
1500 m	Sigvard Ericsson	2:11.0	6
5000 m	Sven Andersson	8:16.9	22
5000 m	Gunnar Sjölin	8:06.7	12
5000 m	Olle Dahlberg	8:01.8	7
5000 m	Sigvard Ericsson	7:56.7	2nd place, silver medalist(s)
10,000 m	Gunnar Ström	17:17.0	15
10,000 m	Sven Andersson	17:13.5	13
10,000 m	Olle Dahlberg	17:01.3	8
10,000 m	Sigvard Ericsson	16:35.9 OR	1st place, gold medalist(s)
