= Figure skating at the 1956 Winter Olympics – Men's singles =

Figure skating at the Olympics

Men's singles at the VII Olympic Winter Games
- Dates: 29 January-1 February 1956
- Competitors: 16 from 11 nations

Medalists
1st place, gold medalist(s)		Hayes Alan Jenkins; United States
2nd place, silver medalist(s)		Ronald Robertson; United States
3rd place, bronze medalist(s)		David Jenkins; United States

The men's figure skating competition at the 1956 Winter Olympics took place at the Olympic Ice Stadium in Cortina d'Ampezzo, Italy. The competition was held on 29 January and 1 February 1956. Sixteen men from eleven countries participated in the competition. The event was dominated by the American skaters who swept the medals. Hayes Jenkins and his brother, David Jenkins, won gold and bronze respectively.

== Competition ==
The event was held outdoors at the Ice Stadium in Cortina d'Ampezzo, the host city for the Games. This would be the last time that the figure skating events were held outdoors at an Olympic Games. The Ice Stadium was the focal point of the Games. It was used not only for figure skating but also for the opening and closing ceremonies. The stadium was built to accommodate 6,000–7,000 people. Temporary seating was added for the figure skating competition that swelled the stadium's capacity to 14,000 people. The ladies' competition was the first figure skating event held at the Games. It was followed by the men's competition and then the pairs. Ice dancing was not contested as it had yet to become an Olympic sport in 1956.

The competition was broken down into two disciplines. The first was a compulsory figures competition, which counted for 60% of the score. This was held on 29 January under near-perfect ice conditions. After a nervous start on the first figure, Hayes Jenkins recovered to hold a narrow lead over his teammate Ronald Robertson at the end of the day, with David Jenkins only slightly behind.

The second discipline was a free skating program, which counted for 40% of the final score. This final program was performed on 1 February. Due to the very cold weather, the ice was extremely hard, causing some of the competitors to skate cautiously. Hayes Jenkins' program, skated to the music "Scheherazade", included jumps and spins blended with connecting steps and choreography. Robertson's program emphasized showmanship with crowd-pleasing jumps and spins, but had less connecting choreography. Robertson narrowly won the free skating with six first places, but Hayes Jenkins' lead from the compulsory figures held up to give him the gold medal. David Jenkins struggled with the hard ice and fell twice in his program, but held his position after the figures to take the bronze medal.

David Jenkins went on to win the gold medal in the men's competition at the 1960 Winter Olympics in Squaw Valley. Hayes Jenkins retired from competitive skating after the 1956 season, and later married Carol Heiss who was the women's silver medalist at the 1956 Games and gold medalist at the 1960 Games.

== Results ==
Rank	Name	Nation	CF	FS	Points	Places
1	Hayes Alan Jenkins	United States	1	2	166.43	13
2	Ronald Robertson	United States	2	1	165.79	16
3	David Jenkins	United States	3	3	162.82	27
4	Alain Giletti	France	4	4	159.63	37
5	Karol Divín	Czechoslovakia	5	5	154.25	49.5
6	Michael Booker	Great Britain	6	6	154.26	53.5
7	Norbert Felsinger	Austria	7	8	150.55	67
8	Charles Snelling	Canada	9	7	150.42	67
9	Alain Calmat	France	8	9	148.35	77
10	Tilo Gutzeit	United Team of Germany	10	11	141.08	90
11	François Pache	Switzerland	11	10	139.39	95
12	Hans Müller	Switzerland	12	12	135.28	112
13	Allan Ganter	Australia	13	14	132.41	114
14	Darío Villalba	Spain	14	16	127.30	128
15	Kalle Tuulos	Finland	15	15	124.50	137
16	Charles Keeble	Australia	16	13	123.93	137

== See also ==
- List of IOC country codes
- 1956 Winter Olympics
