= Spain at the 1952 Winter Olympics =

- IOC code: ESP
- NOC: Spanish Olympic Committee
- Website: www.coe.es (in Spanish)

in Oslo
- Competitors: 4 (men) in 1 sport
- Flag bearer: José Picurio
- Medals: Gold 0 Silver 0 Bronze 0 Total 0

Winter Olympics appearances (overview)
- 1936; 1948; 1952; 1956; 1960; 1964; 1968; 1972; 1976; 1980; 1984; 1988; 1992; 1994; 1998; 2002; 2006; 2010; 2014; 2018; 2022; 2026

Spain competed at the 1952 Winter Olympics in Oslo, Norway.

== Alpine skiing ==
Men

Athlete	Event	Race 1		Race 2		Total	
Athlete	Event	Time	Rank	Time	Rank	Time	Rank
Juan Poll	Downhill					3:10.1	54
Luis Arias	Downhill					3:09.2	53
Francisco Viladomat	Downhill					2:55.4	37
Luis Molné	Giant Slalom					3:04.9	62
Juan Poll	Giant Slalom					3:03.5	60
Luis Arias	Giant Slalom					3:01.5	57
Francisco Viladomat	Giant Slalom					2:51.6	40
Luis Molné	Slalom	1:26.5	72	did not advance			
Francisco Viladomat	Slalom	1:18.9	61	did not advance			
Juan Poll	Slalom	1:12.1	50	did not advance			
Luis Arias	Slalom	1:10.4	47	did not advance			

== Sources ==
- Petersen, Rolf, ed. (1952). The Official Report of the Organising Committee of the VIth Winter Olympic Games 1952 at Oslo (PDF). Oslo.
- Olympic Winter Games 1952, full results by sports-reference.com
