= Japan at the 1956 Winter Olympics =

- IOC code: JPN (GIA used at these Games)
- NOC: Japanese Olympic Committee
- Website: www.joc.or.jp (in Japanese and English)

in Cortina d'Ampezzo
- Competitors: 10 (men) in 5 sports
- Flag bearer: Hiroshi Yoshizawa
- Medals Ranked 11th: Gold 0 Silver 1 Bronze 0 Total 1

Winter Olympics appearances (overview)
- 1928; 1932; 1936; 1948; 1952; 1956; 1960; 1964; 1968; 1972; 1976; 1980; 1984; 1988; 1992; 1994; 1998; 2002; 2006; 2010; 2014; 2018; 2022; 2026

Japan competed at the 1956 Winter Olympics in Cortina d'Ampezzo, Italy. Chiharu Igaya won the nation's first ever medal and the first Asian medalist at the Winter Olympic Games.

== Medalists ==
Medal	Name	Sport	Event	Date
Silver	Chiharu Igaya	Alpine skiing	Men's slalom	January 31

== Alpine skiing ==
Men

Athlete	Event	Race 1		Race 2		Total	
Athlete	Event	Time	Rank	Time	Rank	Time	Rank
Chiharu Igaya	Downhill					DSQ	–
Susumu Sugiyama	Downhill					3:39.1	28
Susumu Sugiyama	Giant Slalom					3:40.8	45
Chiharu Igaya	Giant Slalom					3:15.6	11
Susumu Sugiyama	Slalom	1:51.0	38	2:26.0	37	4:17.0	33
Chiharu Igaya	Slalom	1:30.2	6	1:48.5	2	3:18.7	2nd place, silver medalist(s)

== Cross-country skiing ==
Men

Event	Athlete	Race	
Event	Athlete	Time	Rank
15 km	Tatsuo Miyao	56:59	48
30 km	Tatsuo Miyao	1'55:40	28
50 km	Tatsuo Miyao	3'25:47	25

== Nordic combined ==
Events:

- normal hill ski jumping (Three jumps, best two counted and shown here.)
- 15 km cross-country skiing

Athlete	Event	Ski Jumping				Cross-country			Total	
Athlete	Event	Distance 1	Distance 2	Points	Rank	Time	Points	Rank	Points	Rank
Hiroshi Yoshizawa	Individual	69.5	76.5	210.5	5	DNF	–	–	DNF	–
Koichi Sato	Individual	68.0	65.5	191.5	23	1'08:21	193.400	35	384.900	33

== Ski jumping ==
Athlete	Event	Jump 1			Jump 2			Total	
Athlete	Event	Distance	Points	Rank	Distance	Points	Rank	Points	Rank
Koichi Sato	Normal hill	68.0	91.0	36	66.0	87.5	41	178.5	39
Hiroshi Yoshizawa	Normal hill	80.5	106.5	9	74.0	98.5	18	205.0	13

== Speed skating ==
Men

Event	Athlete	Race	
Event	Athlete	Time	Rank
500 m	Kiyotaka Takabayashi	43.6	30
500 m	Taketsugu Asazaka	43.1	22
500 m	Yoshitaki Hori	42.8	17
500 m	Shinkichi Takemura	42.4	11
1500 m	Yoshiyasu Gomi	2:19.2	39
1500 m	Shinkichi Takemura	2:18.3	36
1500 m	Yoshitaki Hori	2:15.9	23
1500 m	Taketsugu Asazaka	2:15.4	21
5000 m	Yoshitaki Hori	8:53.5	46
5000 m	Taketsugu Asazaka	8:23.6	28
5000 m	Yoshiyasu Gomi	8:22.2	27
10,000 m	Yoshiyasu Gomi	17:35.9	23
10,000 m	Taketsugu Asazaka	17:35.3	22
