= Sheena Mackintosh =

British alpine skier (1928–2018)

Personal information
- Full name: Asthore Sheena Hilleary (née Mackintosh)
- Nationality: British
- Born: 10 November 1928 London, England
- Died: 13 December 2018 (aged 90)
- Spouse: Ruaraidh Edward Hilleary

Sport
- Sport: Alpine skiing

Asthore Sheena Hilleary (née Mackintosh) (10 November 1928 – 13 December 2018) was a British alpine skier and the daughter of former British downhill champion Chris Mackintosh and Lady Jean Bell (née Douglas-Hamilton); daughter of the 13th Duke of Hamilton. She competed in three events at both the 1948 Winter Olympics and the 1952 Winter Olympics under the name Sheena Mackintosh.

== British Ladies Ski Championship ==
Mackintosh captained the British Ladies' Team at the 1950 Lowlander’s Championship at Val-d’Isère and finished third behind her younger sister Vora Mackintosh at the 1951 Championship.

After finishing runner-up in the British Ladies Combined Championship in 1950, Mackintosh won the Championship title in both 1951 and 1952.

== 1948 & 1952 Olympics ==
Representing Great Britain, Mackintosh competed in three alpine ski events –Downhill, Combined and Slalom– at the 1948 Winter Olympics, where she finished 24th, 33rd, and 21st respectively. Members of the British Ladies' Ski Team who competed alongside Mackintosh included Miss Isobel Roe, Miss Xanthe Ryder, Miss Evelyn Pinching, Miss Rosemarie Sparrow, Mrs. Bunty Greeland, and Mrs. Biddy Duke-Woolley. Once again representing Great Britain, Mackintosh competed in three alpine ski events –Downhill, Slalom and Giant slalom– at the 1952 Winter Olympics, where she finished 26th, 28th, and 28th respectively.

== Family ==
Her siblings Charlach Mackintosh, Vora Mackintosh and Douglas Mackintosh have all represented Great Britain in skiing events at various Winter Olympic Games.

A series of photographic portraits of Sheena as a child with her family, taken by Bassano Ltd are held in the collection of the National Portrait Gallery, London.

In 1952 she married Ruaraidh Edward Hilleary.
