= Chris Mackintosh =

Scottish sportsman

Personal information
- Nationality: British (Scottish)
- Born: 31 October 1903 Heidelberg, Baden-Württemberg, Germany
- Died: 12 January 1974 (aged 70) Haddington, Scotland

Sport
- Sport: Athletics
- Event: Rugby Union / Bobsleigh / long jump
- Club: University of Oxford AC; Achilles Club
Medal record
Bobsleigh
World Championships
Gold medal – first place	1938 Garmisch-Partenkirchen	Four-man

Charles Ernest Whistler Mackintosh also known as Chris Mackintosh (31 October 1903 – 12 January 1974) was a Scottish rugby union internationalist, athlete, skier and bobsledder who competed in the 1920s and 1930s. He won a gold medal in the four-man bobsleigh event at the 1938 FIBT World Championships in Garmisch-Partenkirchen. Mackintosh also became Chairman of the Henry Lunn Alpine Tours company (part of the Lunn Poly group) and President of both the Downhill Only Ski Club Wengen (1958-1964) and the Amateur Inter-Ski Club, the Kandahar Ski Club.

== Career ==
Mackintosh competed in skiing from 1923 to 1933.

mackintosh finished second behind Harold Abrahams in the long jump event at the 1924 AAA Championships. Shortly afterwards he was selected for the British team at the 1924 Olympic Games in Paris, where he finished sixth in the men's long jump event. He also won the Inferno ski race, the third time it was held.

== Personal life ==
He married Lady Jean Douglas-Hamilton, daughter of Duke Alfred Douglas-Hamilton and his wife, the animal welfare activist Nina Poore. Chris and Jean's four children, Sheena Mackintosh, Vora Mackintosh, Douglas Mackintosh, and Charlach Mackintosh all represented Great Britain in skiing events in the Winter Olympics.

his surname was derived from Chris's paternal grandfather, Aeneas John Mackintosh and great-grandfather John McIntosh. Aeneas was a picture-framer from Bethnal Green, London who worked for and married Marie Anna Rochefort. Her framing business traded as "Marian Rochefort".
