= France at the 1956 Winter Olympics =

- IOC code: FRA
- NOC: French Olympic Committee

in Cortina d'Ampezzo
- Competitors: 32 (25 men, 7 women) in 6 sports
- Flag bearer: James Couttet
- Medals: Gold 0 Silver 0 Bronze 0 Total 0

Winter Olympics appearances (overview)
- 1924; 1928; 1932; 1936; 1948; 1952; 1956; 1960; 1964; 1968; 1972; 1976; 1980; 1984; 1988; 1992; 1994; 1998; 2002; 2006; 2010; 2014; 2018; 2022; 2026

France competed at the 1956 Winter Olympics in Cortina d'Ampezzo, Italy, from January 26 to February 5

== Alpine skiing ==
Men

Athlete	Event	Race 1		Race 2		Total	
Athlete	Event	Time	Rank	Time	Rank	Time	Rank
André Simond	Downhill					DSQ	–
Adrien Duvillard	Downhill					DSQ	–
René Collet	Downhill					DSQ	–
Charles Bozon	Downhill					3:01.9	8
Gérard Pasquier	Giant Slalom					3:25.6	30
François Bonlieu	Giant Slalom					3:11.8	9
Charles Bozon	Giant Slalom					3:08.4	5
Adrien Duvillard	Giant Slalom					3:07.9	4
Charles Bozon	Slalom	1:32.3	10	1:53.9	7	3:26.2	7
Bernard Perret	Slalom	1:31.7	8	1:54.6	9	3:26.3	8
Gérard Pasquier	Slalom	1:31.0	7	1:53.6	4	3:24.6	6
Adrien Duvillard	Slalom	1:27.5	2	2:51.4 (+0:10)	54	4:18.9	38

Women

Athlete	Event	Race 1		Race 2		Total	
Athlete	Event	Time	Rank	Time	Rank	Time	Rank
Edith Bonlieu	Downhill					DNF	–
Madeleine Front	Downhill					1:53.6	24
Marysette Agnel	Downhill					1:52.4	21
Josette Nevière	Downhill					1:49.2	8
Paule Moris	Giant Slalom					2:02.5	18
Madeleine Front	Giant Slalom					2:02.3	14
Josette Nevière	Giant Slalom					2:00.8	10
Marysette Agnel	Giant Slalom					1:59.4	8
Muriel Lip	Slalom	DSQ	–	–	–	DSQ	–
Paule Moris	Slalom	1:13.9	28	1:01.7	16	2:15.6	18
Josette Nevière	Slalom	1:00.3	13	58.0	3	1:58.3	8
Marysette Agnel	Slalom	58.2	6	1:00.6	13	1:58.8	9

== Bobsleigh ==
Sled	Athletes	Event	Run 1		Run 2		Run 3		Run 4		Total	
Sled	Athletes	Event	Time	Rank	Time	Rank	Time	Rank	Time	Rank	Time	Rank
FRA-1	André Robin; Lucien Grosso	Two-man	DNF	–	–	–	–	–	–	–	DNF	–
FRA-2	André Donnert; Serge Giacchini	Two-man	1:27.41	19	1:26.83	17	1:27.41	18	DNF	–	DNF	–

Sled	Athletes	Event	Run 1		Run 2		Run 3		Run 4		Total	
Sled	Athletes	Event	Time	Rank	Time	Rank	Time	Rank	Time	Rank	Time	Rank
FRA-1	André Robin; Pierre Bouvier; Jacques Panciroli; Lucien Grosso	Four-man	1:20.00	13	1:21.25	19	1:20.95	13	1:21.63	17	5:23.83	18

== Cross-country skiing ==
Men

Event	Athlete	Race	
Event	Athlete	Time	Rank
15 km	Victor Arbez	57:38	52
15 km	Paul Romand	57:11	50
15 km	Benoît Carrara	53:41	22
15 km	Jean Mermet	53:40	20
30 km	Charles Binaux	DSQ	–
30 km	Paul Romand	1'59:02	35
30 km	René Mandrillon	1'52:18	22

Men's 4 × 10 km relay

Athletes	Race	
Athletes	Time	Rank
Victor Arbez; René Mandrillon; Benoît Carrara; Jean Mermet	2'24:06	6

== Figure skating ==
Men

Athlete	CF	FS	Points	Places	Rank
Alain Calmat	8	9	148.35	77	9
Alain Giletti	4	4	159.63	37	4

Women

Athlete	CF	FS	Points	Places	Rank
Maryvonne Huet	17	19	138.30	194	17

== Ski jumping ==
Athlete	Event	Jump 1			Jump 2			Total	
Athlete	Event	Distance	Points	Rank	Distance	Points	Rank	Points	Rank
Régis Robert Rey	Normal hill	65.0	82.0	49	65.0	82.0	46	164.0	48
André Monnier	Normal hill	67.5	82.5	48	66.0	85.0	43	167.5	46
Richard Rabasa	Normal hill	66.0	84.5	45	66.0	83.0	44	167.5	46

== Speed skating ==
Men

Event	Athlete	Race	
Event	Athlete	Time	Rank
500 m	Raymond Gilloz	43.2	25
1500 m	Raymond Gilloz	2:17.7	34
5000 m	Raymond Gilloz	8:32.5	35
