= Forrer =

Forrer is a surname. Notable people with the surname include:

- Emil Forrer (1894–1986), Swiss Assyriologist and Hittitologist
- Hans Forrer (1929–2017), Swiss alpine skier
- Leonard Forrer (1869–1953), Swiss-born British numismatist and coin dealer
- Ludwig Forrer (1845–1921), Swiss politician
- Willi Forrer (born 1935), Swiss alpine skier
- Remo Forrer (born 2001), Swiss singer, representing Switzerland at the Eurovision Song Contest 2023
