= Elise Båtnes =

Norwegian violinist (born 1971)

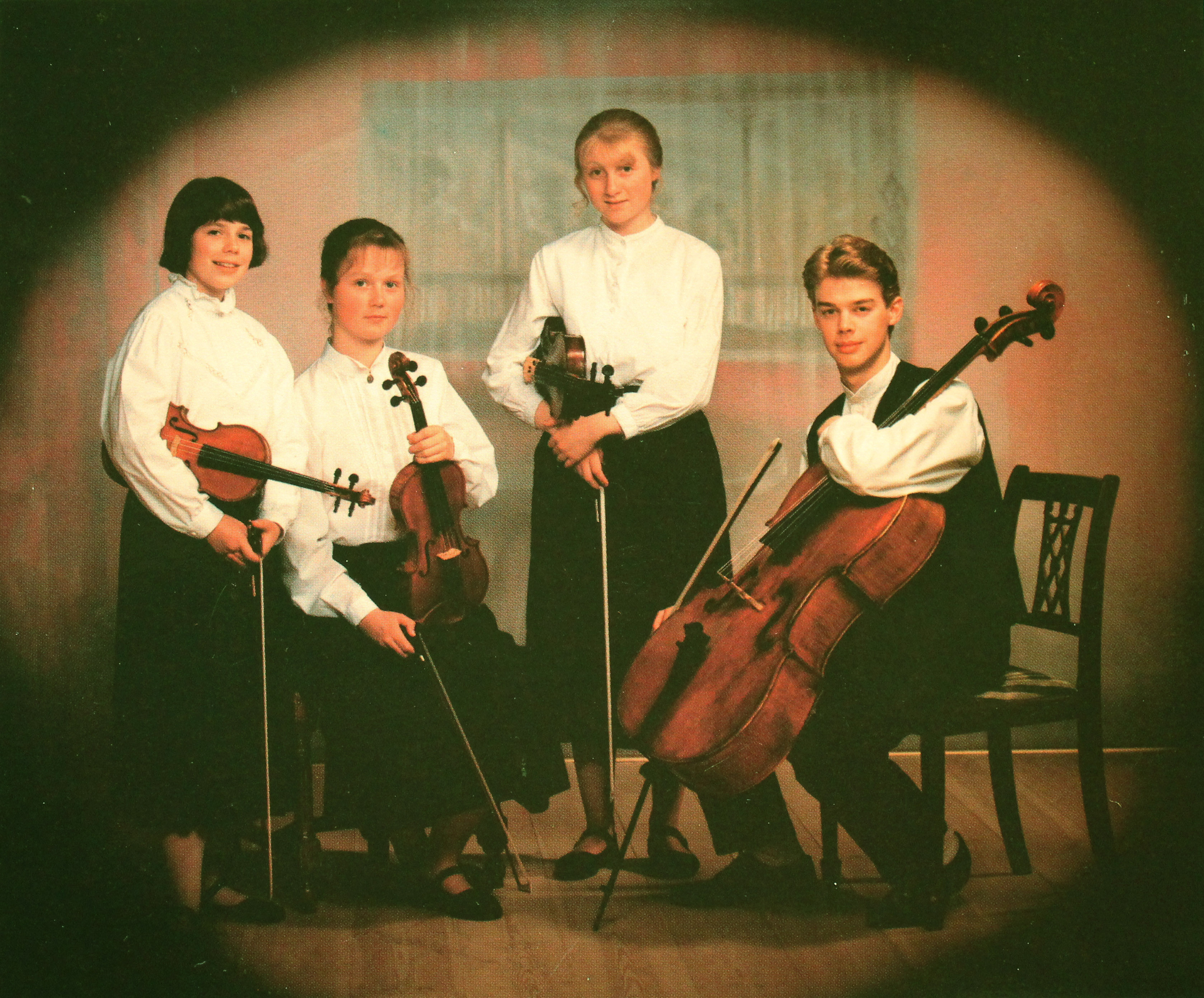
- Båtnes (far left) with the Trønderkvartetten string quartet, 1986

Background information
- Born: 24 June 1971 (age 54); Trondheim
- Occupation: Violinist
- Instrument: 1689 "Arditi" Stradivari violin

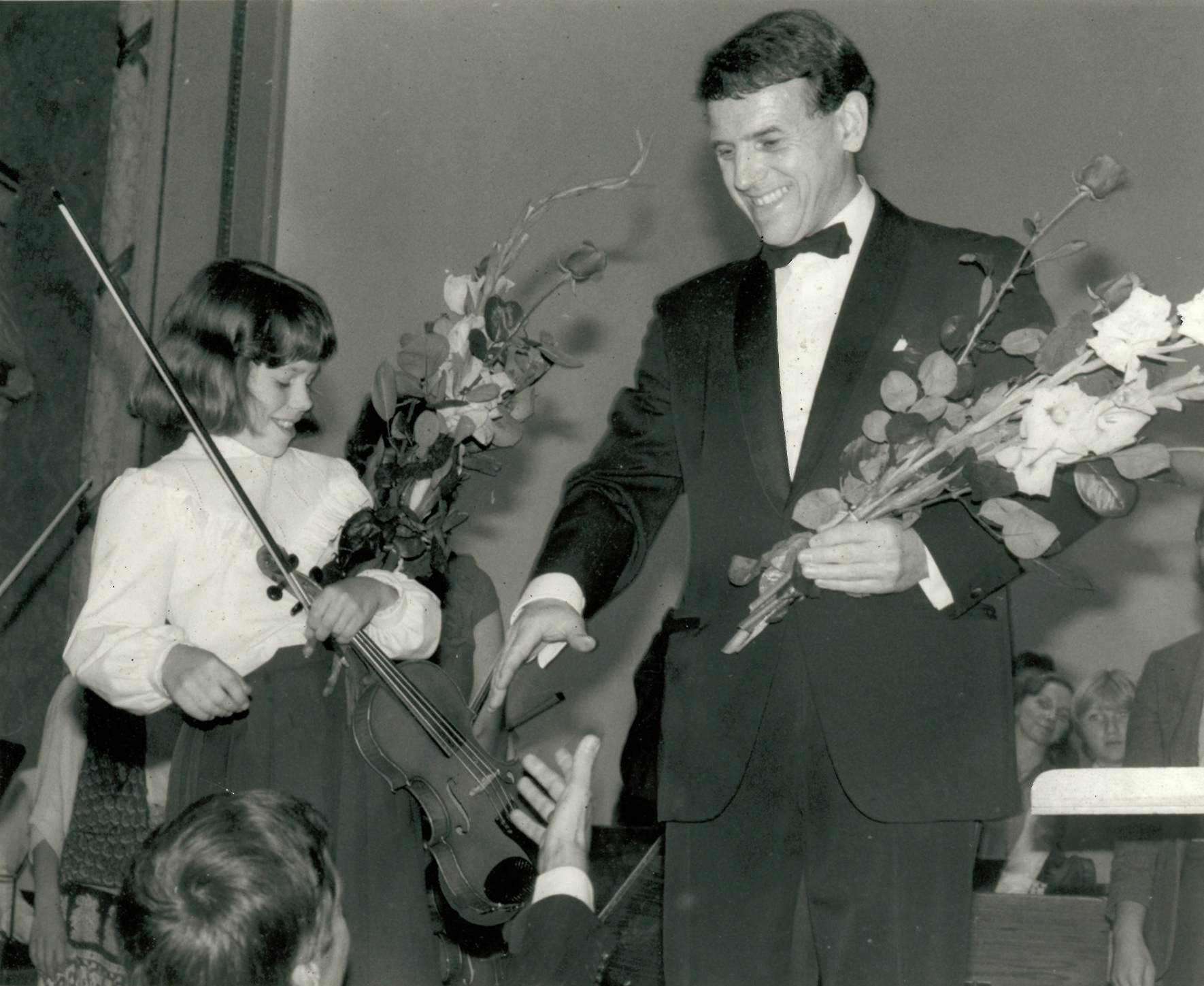
Elise Båtnes at age 12, with her teacher Kåre Opdal

Elise Båtnes (born 1971) is a Norwegian violinist. Since 2006, she has been leader of the Oslo Philharmonic orchestra.

== Biography ==
Born on 24 June 1971 in Trondheim, Båtnes started playing the violin at the age of four. Four years later she appeared for the first time as a soloist with the Trondheim Symphony Orchestra. In 1981, when she was ten, she performed in a children's concert with the Oslo Philharmonic, appearing as a soloist a year later.

She studied under Dorothy DeLay in the United States, Ruggiero Ricci in Salzburg, David Takeno in London and Arve Tellefsen in Oslo. She also received guidance from Mariss Jansons of the Oslo Philharmonic. She has played as a soloist with orchestras in Sweden, Denmark, Germany and Belgian, participating in broadcasts from these countries as well as from Finland, Spain and the United States.

Båtnes first joined the Oslo Philharmonic when she was 19, returning as leader in 2006. Her most memorable concert with the orchestra was when she played Bruckner's 7th Symphony while on tour in England in 1991. She has also held positions as leader of the Danish National Symphony Orchestra in Copenhagen (2000–04) and the WDR Orchestra in Cologne (2004–08). In addition to Bruckner, she also enjoys playing the music of Richard Strauss, Gustav Mahler and Richard Wagner.

She is playing on the "Arditi" violin, made by Antonio Stradivari in 1689, on loan from Dextra Musica.
