= Grach =

Grach may refer to:

- MP-443 Grach, a Russian pistol.
- Sukhoi Su-25, a turbojet powered armored ground support aircraft.
- Foel Grach, a mountain in the Welsh Carneddau.
- Rafayel Grach, a former Soviet speed skater and Olympic medalist.
- Chaim Soloveitchik, Rabbi part of the Brisker dynasty.
- Grach, an Elvish word meaning "curse" in the Tolkien universe.
