= Molné =

Molné is a surname. Notable people with the surname include:

- Luis Molné (born 1926), Andorran alpine skier
- Marc Forné Molné (born 1946), Andorran politician
