= Uimonen =

Uimonen is a Finnish surname. Notable people with the surname include:

- Aarne Uimonen (1891–1958), Finnish military officer
- Nelma U, born Alma Uimonen,' (born 2002), Finnish musician
- Annikki Uimonen (1891–1938), Finnish opera singer
- Arto Uimonen (born 1958), Finnish footballer
- Herman Uimonen (1895–1973), Finnish ice hockey player
- Ilkka Uimonen (born 1966), Finnish photographer
- Keijo Marko, born Keijo Uimonen (1936–1988), Finnish singer
- Markku Uimonen (born 1965), Finnish visual designer
- Risto Uimonen (born 1947), Finnish journalist
- Samppa Uimonen (1927–2001) Finnish folk musician
- Virpi Uimonen (1945–2007), Finnish actress
- Yrjö Uimonen (1932–1997), Finnish speed skater
