= Simond =

Simond is a French surname. Notable people with the surname include:

- Ada Simond (1903–1989), American public health advocate and historian
- André Simond (born 1929), French alpine skier
- Jean-Christophe Simond (born 1960), French figure skater and coach
- François Simond (born 1969), French alpine skier
- George Simond (1867–1941), English tennis player
- Paul-Louis Simond, French physician and biologist
- Pierre Simond, (1651–1720) French Huguenot church Minister

== See also ==
- Simon (disambiguation)
- Symon
- Simons
