= Opdal =

Opdal may refer to:

== Places ==
- Opdal, an old name for the old Uvdal Municipality in Buskerud county, Norway
- Opdal, an old name for Oppdal Municipality in Trøndelag county, Norway

== People ==
- Håkon Opdal, a Norwegian football goalkeeper
- Kåre Opdal, a Norwegian alpine skier
