= Shustov =

Shustov may refer to

- Shustov (surname)
- Shustov vodka
- 9145 Shustov, a minor planet
