= Netherlands at the 1956 Winter Olympics =

- Flag of the Netherlands
- IOC code: NED (OLA used at these Games)
- NOC: Dutch Olympic Committee

in Cortina d'Ampezzo
- Competitors: 8 (6 men, 2 women) in 2 sports
- Flag bearer: Kees Broekman (speed skating)
- Medals: Gold 0 Silver 0 Bronze 0 Total 0

Winter Olympics appearances (overview)
- 1928; 1932; 1936; 1948; 1952; 1956; 1960; 1964; 1968; 1972; 1976; 1980; 1984; 1988; 1992; 1994; 1998; 2002; 2006; 2010; 2014; 2018; 2022; 2026

Athletes from the Netherlands competed at the 1956 Winter Olympics in Cortina d'Ampezzo, Italy.

== Figure skating ==
Athlete	Event	CF	FS	Points	Places	Final rank
Sjoukje Dijkstra	Women's singles	12	15	145.80	140	12
Joan Haanappel	Women's singles	14	11	145.85	145.5	13

== Speed skating ==
Men

Event	Athlete	Race	
Event	Athlete	Time	Rank
500 m	Kees Broekman	44.2	37
500 m	Wim de Graaff	44.9	43
500 m	Gerard Maarse	43.1	22
1500 m	Kees Broekman	2:13.2	14
1500 m	Wim de Graaff	2:13.1	11
1500 m	Gerard Maarse	2:13.1	11
1500 m	Nico Olsthoorn	2:22.6	49
5000 m	Jeen van den Berg	8:19.1	24
5000 m	Kees Broekman	8:00.2	4
5000 m	Wim de Graaff	8:00.2	4
5000 m	Gerard Maarse	8:11.1	18
10,000 m	Kees Broekman	16:51.2	5
10,000 m	Wim de Graaff	17:21.6	18
10,000 m	Egbert van 't Oever	17:37.7	25
