= Andreas Rüedi =

Swiss alpine skier (1931–2008)

Personal information
- Nationality: Swiss
- Born: 20 June 1931
- Died: 22 February 2008 (aged 76)

Sport
- Sport: Alpine skiing

Andreas Rüedi (20 June 1931 – 22 February 2008) was a Swiss alpine skier. He competed in the men's downhill at the 1956 Winter Olympics. In 1957, he founded an architecture company based in Klosters, Switzerland. It is now led by his son, Andreas Rüedi jr.
