= Charlach Mackintosh =

British alpine skier (1935–2019)

Personal information
- Nationality: British
- Born: 1 June 1935; London, England
- Died: 8 August 2019 (aged 84); Calgary, Alberta, Canada

Sport
- Sport: Alpine skiing

Charlach Mackintosh (1 June 1935 – 8 August 2019) was a British alpine skier. He competed at the 1956 Winter Olympics and the 1960 Winter Olympics.

He was from a family of Olympians, his parents were the multi-sport athlete Charles Ernest Whistler Mackintosh and Lady Jean Douglas-Hamilton (daughter of Alfred Douglas-Hamilton, 13th Duke of Hamilton. His siblings Sheena Mackintosh, Vora Mackintosh and Douglas Mackintosh all competed at the Olympics.
