= Sven Erbs =

Swedish bobsledder

Sven Gustav Erbs (March 20, 1911 – May 16, 1959) was a Swedish bobsledder who competed in the 1956 Winter Olympics.

Together with Kjell Holmström, Walter Aronson, and Jan Lapidoth he was a crew member of Sweden II who finished 13th in the four-man event.

Together with Walter Aronson he also competed in the two-man event but they were not able to finish.

Erbs died on May 16, 1959, in an aviation accident in Salzgitter, Germany.
