= Renée Colliard =

Swiss alpine skier (1933–2022)

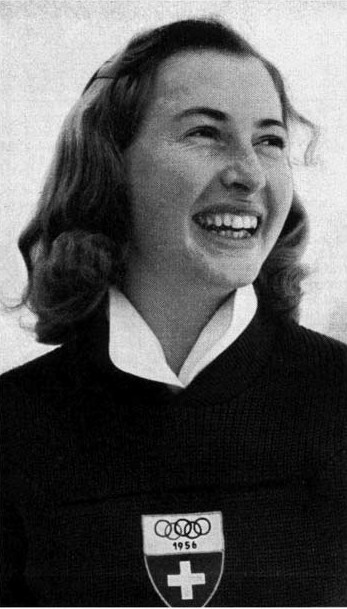

Personal information
- Born: 24 December 1933 Geneva, Switzerland
- Died: 15 December 2022 (aged 88)
Medal record
Women's Alpine skiing
Representing Switzerland
Gold medal – first place	1956 Cortina d'Ampezzo	Slalom

Renée Colliard (24 December 1933 in Geneva – 15 December 2022) was a Swiss alpine skier. At the 1956 Winter Olympics in Cortina d'Ampezzo, she became Olympic champion in Slalom.
