= Shustov (surname) =

Shustov (masculine, Russian: Шустов) or Shustova (feminine, Russian: Шустова) is a Russian surname. Notable people with the surname include:

- Aleksandr Shustov (born 1984), Russian high jumper
- Nikolay Shustov (1834–1868), Russian painter
- Sergey Shustov (born 1930), Soviet alpine skier
