= Regina Schöpf =

Austrian alpine skier (1935–2008)

Olympic medal record

Women's Alpine skiing

Representing Austria
Silver medal – second place	1956 Cortina	Slalom

Regina Schöpf (later Bacher; 16 September 1935 – 30 October 2008) was an Austrian alpine skier who competed in the 1956 Winter Olympics.

She was born in Seefeld, Tirol.

In 1956 she won the silver medal in the slalom event. In the giant slalom competition she finished ninth.
