= Alv Gjestvang =

Norwegian speed skater (1937–2016)

Personal information
- Born: 13 September 1937 Østre Toten Municipality, Norway
- Died: 26 November 2016 (aged 79)

Sport
- Country: Norway
- Sport: Men's speed skating
Medal record
Olympic Games
| Silver medal – second place | 1964 Innsbruck | 500 m |
| Bronze medal – third place | 1956 Cortina d'Ampezzo | 500 m |

Alv Gjestvang (13 September 1937 − 26 November 2016) was a Norwegian speed skater and Olympic medalist, born in Østre Toten Municipality. He received a bronze medal at the 1956 Winter Olympics in Cortina d'Ampezzo, and a silver medal at the 1964 Winter Olympics in Innsbruck. He represented the speed skating clubs Skreia IL, Oslo IL and Hamar IL through his career. Gjestvang died from cancer 26 November 2016, aged 79.
