= Leopold Sylvestre =

Canadian speed skater

Léopold Sylvestre
Personal information
- Born: 13 December 1911; Montreal, Quebec, Canada
- Died: 11 December 1972 (aged 59); Quebec, Canada

Sport
- Sport: Speed skating

Joseph Henry Léopold Sylvestre (13 December 1911 – 11 December 1972) was a Canadian speed skater. He competed in the men's 500 metres event at the 1932 Winter Olympics.

By 1962, Sylvester had become a coaching staff manager in Mount Royal, Quebec, working alongside Johnny Sands. He died in 1972.
