= Lino Zecchini =

Italian alpine skier

Personal information
- Nationality: Italian
- Born: 8 December 1928 (age 96); San Martino di Castrozza, Italy

Sport
- Sport: Alpine skiing

Lino Zecchini (born 8 December 1928) is an Italian alpine skier. He competed in the men's downhill at the 1956 Winter Olympics in which he did not place.
