= Cristina Ebner =

Italian alpine skier (born 1938)

Personal information
- Nationality: Italian
- Born: 3 September 1938 (age 86)

Sport
- Sport: Alpine skiing

Cristina Ebner (born 3 September 1938) is an Italian alpine skier. She competed in the women's slalom at the 1956 Winter Olympics.
