= Tatsuo Miyao =

Japanese cross-country skier (1928–2015)

Personal information
- Nationality: Japanese
- Born: 22 February 1928; Niigata, Japan
- Died: 24 February 2015 (aged 87); Niigata, Japan

Sport
- Sport: Cross-country skiing

Tatsuo Miyao (22 February 1928 – 24 February 2015) was a Japanese cross-country skier. He competed in the men's 15 kilometre event at the 1956 Winter Olympics.
