= Darío Villalba =

Spanish painter and figure skater (1939–2018)

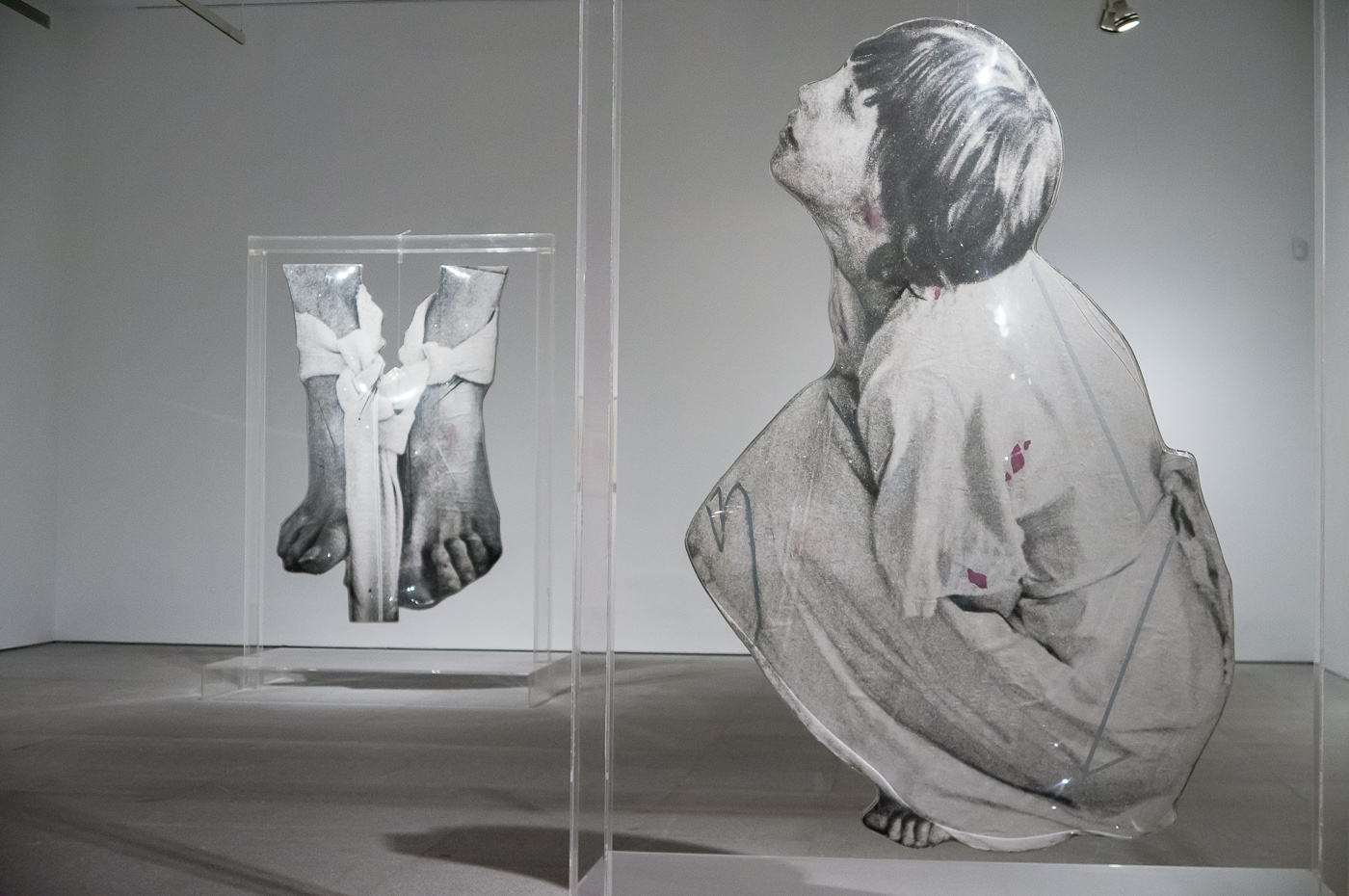

Personal information
- Full name: Darío Villalba Flórez
- Born: 22 February 1939 San Sebastián, Spain
- Died: 16 June 2018 (aged 79) Madrid, Spain

Figure skating career
- Coach: Thea Frenssen
- Began skating: c. 1950

Darío Villalba Flórez (22 February 1939 – 16 June 2018) was a Spanish painter, photographer, and competitive figure skater. He represented Spain at the 1956 Winter Olympics where he placed 14th.

== Life and career ==
Darío Villalba Flórez was born on 22 February 1939 in San Sebastián. He began skating at age 11 in Philadelphia, where his father was serving as the Spanish consul. He returned to Spain when he was 14 years old. As the only rink in Spain was small and of poor quality, his parents sent him to Chamonix, France, where he was taught by a German coach, Thea Frenssen.

At the age of 16, he represented Spain at the 1956 Winter Olympics in Cortina d'Ampezzo, Italy. He placed 14th of 16 competitors in the men's singles event. He then finished 15th at the 1956 World Championships in Garmisch-Partenkirchen, Germany.

In 1983 he received Spain's National Award for Plastic Arts.

In 2002, Villalba became a member of the Real Academia de Bellas Artes de San Fernando.

== Competitive highlights ==
International
Event	1956
Winter Olympics	14th
World Championships	15th

== Bibliography ==
- Luis Gonzales-Robles, Darío Villalba, Galleria del Naviglio, Milan, 1970
- Giancarlo Politi, Darío Villalba, Galeria Vandres, Madrid, 1974
