= Ronald Robertson (figure skater) =

American figure skater (1937–2000)

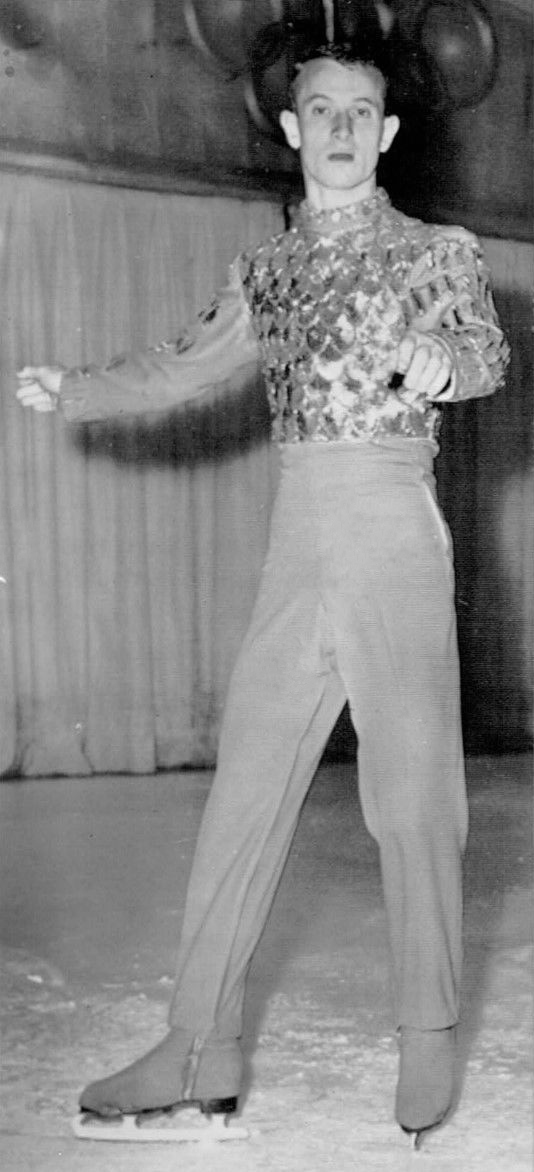
- Robertson in 1962

Personal information
- Born: September 25, 1937 Brackenridge, Pennsylvania, U.S.
- Died: February 4, 2000 (aged 62) Fountain Valley, California, U.S.

Figure skating career
- Country: United States
- Retired: 1956
Medal record
Figure skating
Representing United States
Olympic Games
| Silver medal – second place | 1956 Cortina d'Ampezzo | Singles |
World Championships
| Silver medal – second place | 1956 Garmisch-Partenkirchen | Singles |
| Silver medal – second place | 1955 Vienna | Singles |
North American Championships
| Bronze medal – third place | 1953 Cleveland | Singles |

Ronald Frederick "Ronnie" Robertson (September 25, 1937 – February 4, 2000) was an American figure skater who was best known for his spinning ability. He won the silver medal at the 1956 Winter Olympics, became one of the youngest male figure skating Olympic medalists. He twice won the silver at the World Figure Skating Championships. He retired from skating after the 1956 U.S. Championships, where he was nearly disqualified after he was accused by the German Figure Skating Federation for excessive expenses on a European tour. His father, Albert Robertson, a naval architect, accused Hayes Jenkins of trying to disqualify his son. After a huge fight with the U.S. Figure Skating Federation, Robertson was not disqualified after he lost to Jenkins and retired from competitive figure skating and signed a two-year contract with the Ice Capades for $100,000.

In the 1950s, he had a long-term relationship with Tab Hunter, who also helped fund his amateur career. Robertson was coached by Gustave Lussi.

Robertson's skating career was also well known on television. He appeared on The Ed Sullivan Show in 1957, and his fast forward upright spin was described as being "faster than an electric fan." He also appeared as a featured guest on The Mickey Mouse Club that year.

After leaving skating to run a small hotel which he owned with his partner, Robertson was persuaded by Ted Wilson, a rink designer and manager in Hong Kong, to return to the ice and teach as a guest coach. Robertson, with former Japanese Junior Championship' champion Sashi Kuchiki, made annual one-month trips to Hong Kong for 10 years teaching at Cityplaza Ice Palace on Hong Kong Island. Robertson was an extremely popular coach during this period and made a lasting impression with his skills and kindness.

During the 1964–65 New York World's Fair, Robertson appeared as the main attraction for Dick Button's Ice Travaganza show.

Ronnie Robertson died on February 4, 2000, at a hospital in Fountain Valley, California, from bronchial pneumonia at the age of 62.

== Results ==
| Event | 1951 | 1952 | 1953 | 1954 | 1955 | 1956 |
|---|---|---|---|---|---|---|
| Winter Olympics | | | | | | 2nd |
| World Championships | | | 4th | 5th | 2nd | 2nd |
| North American Championships | | | 3rd | | | |
| U.S. Championships | 4th J | 1st J | 2nd | 3rd | | 2nd |

- 1973 World Professional Figure Skating Championships – 1st
