= Gerard Maarse =

Dutch speed skater (1929–1989)

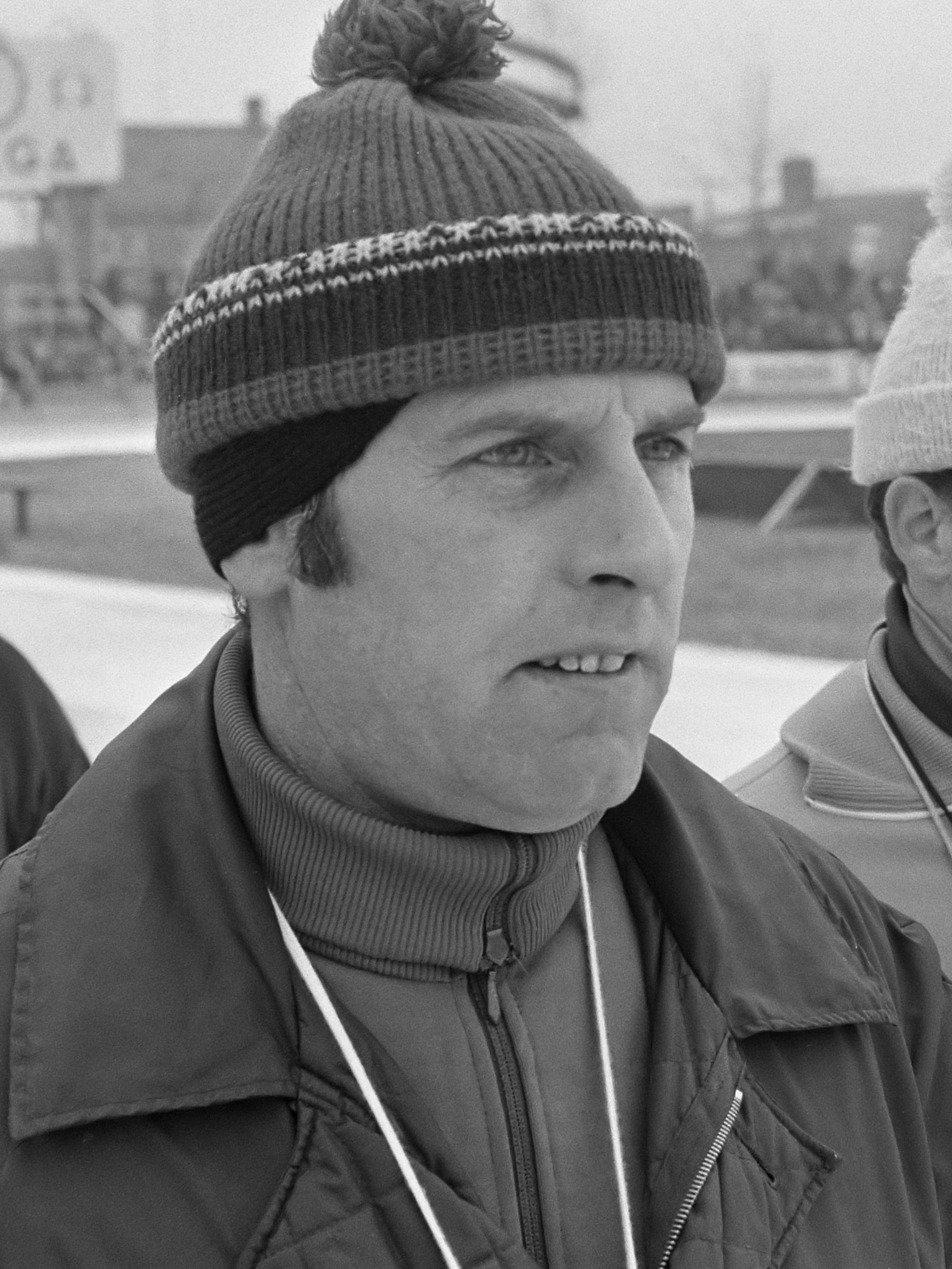
- Gerard Maarse

Personal information
- Born: 1 March 1929 Wilnis, Netherlands
- Died: 27 December 1989 (aged 60) Ermelo, Netherlands

Sport
- Country: Netherlands
- Sport: Speed skating

Achievements and titles
- Personal best(s): 1952 Winter Olympics; 1956 Winter Olympics

Gerardus "Gerard" Maarse (1 March 1929 – 27 December 1989) was a Dutch speed skater who competed in the 1952 Winter Olympics and in the 1956 Winter Olympics.

He was born in Wilnis and died in Ermelo.

In 1952 he finished eighth in the 500 metres competition and twelfth in the 1500 metres event.

Four years later he finished eleventh in the 1500 metres contest, 18th in the 5000 metres competition, and 22nd in the 500 metres contest at the 1956 Games.
