= Andrew Morgan (cross-country skier) =

British cross-country skier (1934–2026)

Personal information
- Full name: Andrew John Mantle Morgan
- Nationality: British
- Born: 24 March 1934 Burton upon Trent, England
- Died: 6 June 2026 (aged 92) Gloucestershire, England

Sport
- Sport: Cross-country skiing

Andrew John Mantle Morgan (24 March 1934 – 6 June 2026) was a British cross-country skier. He competed at the 1956 Winter Olympics, the 1960 Winter Olympics and the 1964 Winter Olympics. Morgan died at his home in Gloucestershire, on 6 June 2026, aged 92.
