= Bengt Malmsten =

Swedish speed skater

Bengt Gunnar Malmsten
Personal information
- Born: 20 March 1922 Borlänge, Dalarna, Sweden
- Died: 20 December 1996 (aged 74) Stockholm, Stockholm, Sweden
- Resting place: Dalarövägen Cemetery

Sport
- Sport: Speed skating
- Club: Södermalms IK

Bengt Gunnar Malmsten (20 March 1922 – 20 December 1996) was a Swedish speed skater who competed in the 1952 Winter Olympics and in the 1956 Winter Olympics.

He was born in Borlänge and died in Stockholm.

In 1952 he finished 31st in the 500 metres competition.

Four years later he finished seventh in the 500 metres event and 17th in the 1500 metres contest at the 1956 Games.
