= James Spencer (cross-country skier) =

British cross-country skier (born 1936)

Personal information
- Nationality: British
- Born: 22 April 1936 (age 90)

Sport
- Sport: Cross-country skiing

James Spencer (born 22 April 1936) is a British cross-country skier. He competed in the men's 30 kilometre event at the 1956 Winter Olympics.
