= John Rainforth =

British bobsledder (born 1934)

Personal information
- Nationality: British
- Born: 10 December 1934 (age 90); Chepstow, Wales

Sport
- Sport: Bobsleigh

John J. Rainforth (born 10 December 1934) is a British bobsledder. He competed in the two-man and the four-man events at the 1956 Winter Olympics.
