= Hans Forrer =

Swiss alpine skier (1929–2017)

Personal information
- Nationality: Swiss
- Born: 8 April 1929; Wildhaus, Switzerland
- Died: 31 August 2017 (aged 88)

Sport
- Sport: Alpine skiing

Hans Forrer (8 April 1929 – 31 August 2017) was a Swiss alpine skier. He competed in the men's downhill at the 1956 Winter Olympics.
