= Toivo Salonen =

Finnish speed skater (1933–2019)

Medal record

Men's Speed Skating

Representing Finland

Olympic Games
Bronze medal – third place	1956 Cortina d'Ampezzo	1,500 m

Toivo Kostia Salonen (21 May 1933 – 28 October 2019) was a former speed skater from Finland. He was born in Pälkäne.

== Medals ==
Toivo Salonen had most of his successes on a national level, becoming Finnish Allround Champion in 1954, 1956, 1957, 1958, 1959, 1961, winning Finnish silver in 1953, 1955, and 1962, and taking bronze in 1963 and 1964. But Salonen also competed internationally for 12 years and participated in 4 Winter Olympics. At the 1956 Winter Olympics in Cortina d'Ampezzo, he won bronze on the 1,500 m. So far (including the 2006 Winter Olympics), Salonen is the last Finnish male speed skater to have won an Olympic medal – the last Finnish female speed skater so far being Kaija Mustonen in 1968. In 1959, Salonen won bronze at the European Allround Championships behind gold medallist Knut Johannesen and fellow countryman Juhani Järvinen, who won silver. Two weeks later at the World Allround Championships, Salonen won silver behind Järvinen.
