= Sergey Shustov =

Soviet alpine skier (born 1930)

Personal information
- Nationality: Soviet
- Born: 1930

Sport
- Sport: Alpine skiing

Sergey Shustov (born 1930) is a Soviet alpine skier. He competed in the men's downhill at the 1956 Winter Olympics.
