= Hiroshi Yoshizawa =

Japanese ski jumper

Hiroshi Yoshizawa (吉沢 広司, Yoshizawa Hiroshi) (May 5, 1931 – April 7, 2013) was a Japanese ski jumper who competed in the early 1950s. He finished tied for 36th in the individual large hill event at the 1952 Winter Olympics in Oslo, and finished 13th at the 1956 Winter Olympics in Cortina d'Ampezzo.
