= Robin Brock-Hollinshead =

British skier (1928–2017)

Personal information
- Nationality: British
- Born: 30 July 1928
- Died: 26 July 2017 (aged 88)

Sport
- Sport: Alpine skiing

Robin Brock-Hollinshead (30 July 1928 – 26 July 2017) was a British alpine skier. He competed in the men's downhill at the 1956 Winter Olympics.
