= Nico Olsthoorn =

Dutch speed skater

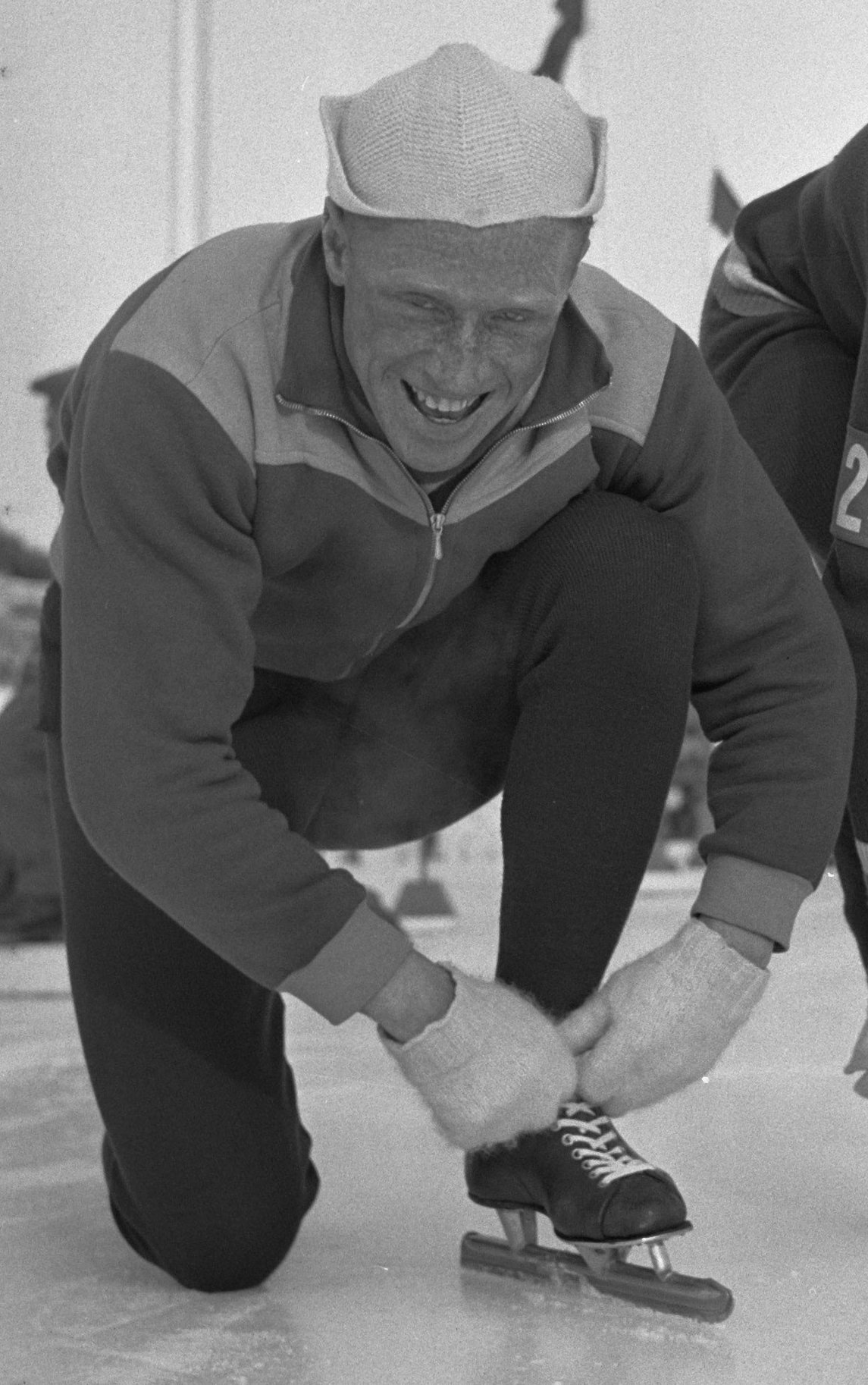
- Nico Olsthoorn in 1953

Personal information
- Nationality: Dutch
- Born: 30 January 1928; Naaldwijk, Netherlands
- Died: 14 June 2011 (aged 83); Hook of Holland, Netherlands

Sport
- Sport: Speed skating

Nico Olsthoorn (30 January 1928 – 14 June 2011) was a Dutch speed skater. He competed in the men's 1500 metres event at the 1956 Winter Olympics.
