= Muriel Lip =

French alpine skier

Personal information
- Nationality: French
- Born: 25 June 1933 (age 91)

Sport
- Sport: Alpine skiing

Muriel Lip (born 25 June 1933) is a French alpine skier. She competed in the women's slalom at the 1956 Winter Olympics.
