= Rafayel Grach =

Soviet speed skater

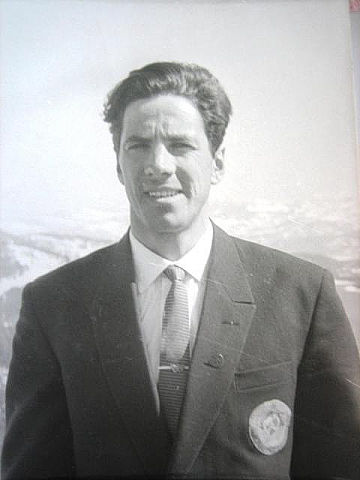

Medal record

Men's Speed skating

Representing Soviet Union
Silver medal – second place	1956 Cortina d'Ampezzo	500 m
Bronze medal – third place	1960 Squaw Valley	500 m

Rafayel Davidovich Grach (Russian: Рафаель Давидович Грач; August 6, 1932 – June 14, 1982) was a Soviet speed skater who competed in the 1956 Winter Olympics, 1960 Winter Olympics and 1964 Winter Olympics. He was born in Kirov, Russia. Grach won the silver medal at the 1956 Winter Olympics and bronze medal at the 1960 Winter Olympics in speed skating.

== Personal records ==
Event	Result	Year
500 m	39.9	1964
1,500 m	2.12.8	1957
5,000 m	8.32.0	1964
10,000 m	17.26.5	1964

== Olympic results ==
Event	Result	Date	Venue
500 m	40.8	January 28, 1956	Cortina d'Ampezzo
500 m	40.4	February 24, 1960	Squaw Valley
500 m	41.4	February 4, 1964	Innsbruck

== See also ==
- List of select Jewish speed skaters
