= Lynn Levy =

American cross-country skier (born 1931)

Personal information
- Nationality: American
- Born: November 18, 1931 (age 94) New Orleans, Louisiana, U.S.

Sport
- Sport: Cross-country skiing

Lynn Thurber Levy (born November 18, 1931) is an American cross-country skier. He competed in the men's 30 kilometre event at the 1956 Winter Olympics.
