= Christopher Williams (bobsleigh) =

British bobsledder

Christopher Charles Ulysses Williams
Personal information
- Nationality: British
- Born: 16 June 1927 London, England
- Died: 30 August 2012 (aged 85) Oxford

Sport
- Sport: Bobsleigh

Christopher Charles Ulysses Williams (16 June 1927 – 30 August 2012) was a British bobsledder. He competed in the two-man and the four-man events at the 1956 Winter Olympics at Cortina d'Ampezzo. He managed the British bobsleigh team at the 1972 Winter Olympics.
