= René Collet =

French alpine skier (1930–2007)

Personal information
- Nationality: French
- Born: 28 December 1930; Fontcouverte-la-Toussuire, France
- Died: 17 September 2007 (aged 76); Thonon-les-Bains, France

Sport
- Sport: Alpine skiing

René Collet (28 December 1930 – 17 September 2007) was a French alpine skier. He competed in the men's downhill at the 1956 Winter Olympics.
