= Juan Poll =

Spanish alpine skier (1927–2001)

Personal information
- Nationality: Spanish
- Born: 17 March 1927; Barcelona, Spain
- Died: 13 June 2001 (aged 74); Barcelona, Spain

Sport
- Sport: Alpine skiing

Juan Poll (17 March 1927 – 13 June 2001) was a Spanish alpine skier. He competed at the 1948 Winter Olympics and the 1952 Winter Olympics.
