= Lars Mattsson =

Swedish alpine skier (born 1932)

Personal information
- Nationality: Swedish
- Born: 17 January 1932 (age 94) Malmberget, Sweden

Sport
- Sport: Alpine skiing

Lars Mattsson (born 17 January 1932) is a Swedish alpine skier. He competed in the men's downhill at the 1956 Winter Olympics.
