= Lucien Grosso =

French bobsledder

Personal information
- Full name: Lucien Hector François Grosso Martin
- Nationality: French
- Born: 1 August 1932; Chambéry, France
- Died: 15 January 1993 (aged 60); Annecy, France

Sport
- Sport: Bobsleigh

Lucien Grosso (1 August 1932 – 15 January 1993) was a French bobsledder. He competed in the two-man and the four-man events at the 1956 Winter Olympics.
