= Wim de Graaff =

Dutch speed skater (1931–2021)

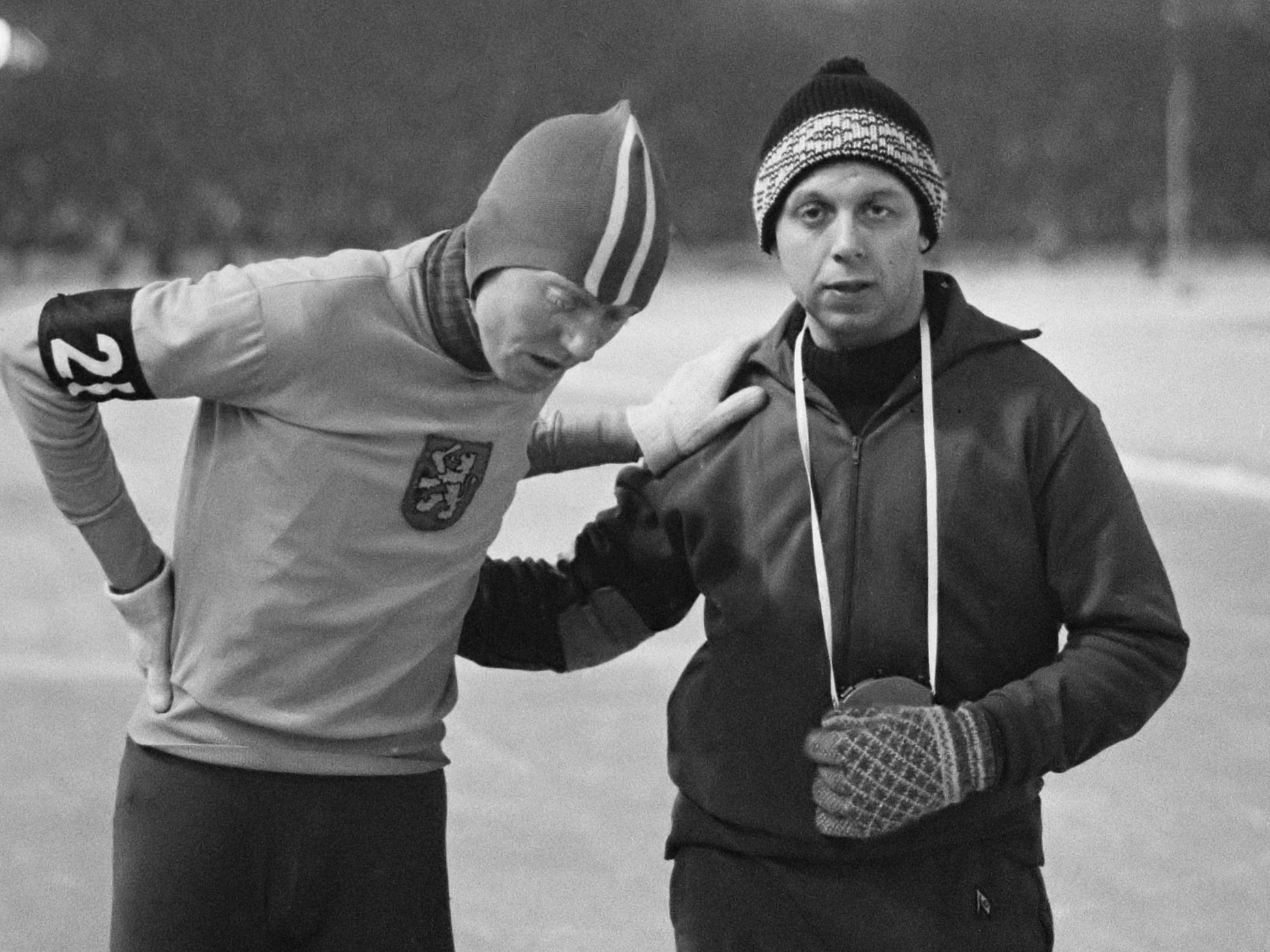
- Peter Nottet and Wim de Graaff (1967)

Personal information
- Born: 25 August 1931 Rotterdam, Netherlands
- Died: 12 January 2021 (aged 89) Rotterdam, Netherlands

Sport
- Country: Netherlands
- Sport: Speed skating

Willem "Wim" de Graaff (25 August 1931 – 12 January 2021) was a Dutch speed skater who competed in the 1956 Winter Olympics and in the 1960 Winter Olympics. He was born and died in Rotterdam.

In 1956 he finished fourth in the 5000 metres event, eleventh in the 1500 metres competition, 18th in the 10000 metres contest, and 43rd in the 500 metres event.

Four years later he finished 15th in the 1500 metres competition and 28th in the 500 metres contest at the 1960 Games.

He later became a famous skate coach and owner of a sportshop in Maassluis.
