= Paul Romand =

French skier (1930–2011)

Personal information
- Full name: Paul André Abel Romand
- Nationality: French
- Born: 25 September 1930; Les Rousses, France
- Died: 1 July 2011 (aged 80); Saint-Claude, France

Sport
- Sport: Biathlon, cross-country skiing

Paul Romand (25 September 1930 – 1 July 2011) was a French skier. He competed at the 1956 Winter Olympics, the 1960 Winter Olympics and the 1964 Winter Olympics.
