= Marvin Crawford =

American cross-country skier (1932–2004)

Personal information
- Nationality: American
- Born: July 30, 1932 Denver, Colorado, United States
- Died: January 10, 2004 (aged 71) Colorado Springs, Colorado, United States

Sport
- Sport: Cross-country skiing

Marvin Crawford (July 30, 1932 – January 10, 2004) was an American cross-country skier. He competed in the men's relay event at the 1956 Winter Olympics.
