= Thomas Cairney (skier) =

British cross-country skier (born 1932)

Personal information
- Nationality: British
- Born: 9 April 1932
- Died: 2022 (aged 89–90)

Sport
- Sport: Cross-country skiing

Thomas Cairney (9 April 1932 – 2022) was a British cross-country skier. He competed in the men's 30 kilometre event at the 1956 Winter Olympics.
