= Yrjö Uimonen =

Finnish speed skater

Personal information
- Nationality: Finnish
- Born: 20 February 1932; Jaakkima, Finland
- Died: 11 June 1997 (aged 65); Rovaniemi, Finland

Sport
- Sport: Speed skating

Yrjö Uimonen (20 February 1932 – 11 June 1997) was a Finnish speed skater. He competed in the men's 500 metres event at the 1956 Winter Olympics.
