= Dorothy Surgenor =

American alpine skier (born 1931)

Personal information
- Born: November 5, 1931 (age 95) Seattle, Washington, U.S.

Sport
- Sport: Alpine skiing

Dorothy Louise Surgenor (born November 5, 1931) is an American alpine skier. She competed in two events at the 1956 Winter Olympics.
