= André Simond =

French alpine skier (born 1935)

Personal information
- Full name: André François Victor Simond
- Nationality: French
- Born: 12 April 1935 (age 90) Samoëns, France

Sport
- Sport: Alpine skiing

André François Victor Simond (born 12 April 1935) is a French former alpine skier. He competed in the men's downhill at the 1956 Winter Olympics.
