= Zandra Nowell =

British skier

Personal information
- Nationality: British
- Born: 10 September 1936 (age 88); Northwich, England

Sport
- Sport: Alpine skiing

Zandra Nowell (born 10 September 1936) is a British alpine skier. She competed in two events at the 1956 Winter Olympics.
