= Josette Nevière =

French alpine skier (1933–1986)

Personal information
- Nationality: French
- Born: 8 April 1933 (age 91); Thonon-les-Bains, France
- Died: 8 January 1986 (aged 52); Le Perreux-sur-Marne, France

Sport
- Sport: Alpine skiing

Josette Nevière (8 April 1933 – 8 January 1986) was a French alpine skier. She competed in three events at the 1956 Winter Olympics.
