= Addie Pryor =

British alpine skier (born 1929)

Personal information
- Full name: Adeline Margaret Pryor
- Nationality: British
- Born: 1 March 1929 (age 96) Barnet, London, England

Sport
- Sport: Alpine skiing

Adeline Margaret Pryor (born 1 March 1929) is a British alpine skier. She competed in two events at the 1956 Winter Olympics.
