= Johnny Sands (speed skater) =

Canadian speed skater (1933–2020)

Personal information
- Full name: John Valance Sands
- Born: April 17, 1933 Saskatoon, Saskatchewan, Canada
- Died: December 31, 2020 (aged 87)
- Home town: Saskatoon, Saskatchewan
- Years active: 1946–1960s

Sport
- Country: Canada
- Sport: Speed skating
- Club: Saskatoon Speed Skating Club

John Valance Sands (April 17, 1933 – December 31, 2020) was a Canadian speed skater who competed at the 1956 Winter Olympics and 1960 Winter Olympics. He was born in Saskatoon, Saskatchewan, and also briefly played Canadian football with the Saskatoon Hilltops in the 1950s. He is a member of the Saskatchewan Sports Hall of Fame and the Saskatoon Sports Hall of Fame.

By 1962, Sands had become a coaching staff manager in Mount Royal, Quebec, working alongside Leopold Sylvestre. He died of pancreatic cancer on December 31, 2020.
