= Vivi-Anne Wassdahl =

Swedish alpine skier (1932–2023)

Personal information
- Nationality: Swedish
- Born: 28 February 1932; Stockholm, Sweden
- Died: 1 December 2023 (aged 91); Östersund, Sweden

Sport
- Sport: Alpine skiing

Vivi-Anne Wassdahl (28 February 1932 – 1 December 2023) was a Swedish alpine skier. She competed in three events at the 1956 Winter Olympics. Wassdahl died in Frösön on 1 December 2023, at the age of 91.
