= Gene Sandvig =

American speed skater (born 1931)

Personal information
- Born: February 8, 1931 (age 95) Minneapolis, Minnesota, U.S.

Sport
- Sport: Speed skating

Gene Sandvig (born February 8, 1931) is an American speed skater. He competed in two events at the 1956 Winter Olympics.

His sister Connie Sandvig was a speed skater who competed at national level and his daughter Susan Sandvig competed at international level. The daughter of Joan Sandvig Peterson, Amy Peterson competed as a short track speed skater at five winter Olympics.

Ref Mn Star Tribune 12/14/25 obituaries Joan Peterson
