= Eivor Berglund =

Swedish alpine skier (born 1935)

Personal information
- Nationality: Swedish
- Born: 22 September 1935 (age 89); Ullånger, Sweden

Sport
- Sport: Alpine skiing

Eivor Berglund (born 22 September 1935) is a Swedish alpine skier. She competed in three events at the 1956 Winter Olympics.
