= Kåre Opdal =

Norwegian alpine skier (1931–2017)

Kåre Marius Opdal (5 September 1931 – 8 May 2017) was a Norwegian alpine skier, born in Narvik. He competed in the downhill at the Winter Olympics in Cortina d'Ampezzo in 1956.
