= Paule Moris =

French alpine skier (1932–2021)

Personal information
- Nationality: French
- Born: 28 December 1932; Paris, France
- Died: 22 March 2021 (aged 88); Bourg-Saint-Maurice, France

Sport
- Sport: Alpine skiing

Paule Moris (28 December 1932 – 22 March 2021) was a French alpine skier. She competed in two events at the 1956 Winter Olympics.
