= Nigel Gardner =

British alpine skier (1933–2016)

Personal information
- Nationality: British
- Born: 16 February 1933
- Died: 17 September 2016 (aged 83)

Sport
- Sport: Alpine skiing

Nigel Gardner (16 February 1933 – 17 September 2016) was a British alpine skier. He competed in two events at the 1956 Winter Olympics.
