= Walter Aronsson =

Swedish bobsledder (1917–2010)

Medal record

Bobsleigh

Representing Sweden

World Championships
Bronze medal – third place	1953 Garmisch-Partenkirchen	Four-man

Walter Eric Aronson (March 28, 1917, Norrtälje – March 11, 2010) was a Swedish bobsledder who competed in the 1950s and in the 1960s. He won a bronze medal in the four-man event (tied with West Germany) at the 1953 FIBT World Championships in Garmisch-Partenkirchen.

At the 1956 Winter Olympics he finished 13th in the four-man event. He also competed in the two-man event but was not able to finish.

Eight years later he finished eleventh in the four-man event at the 1964 Winter Olympics.
