= Jocelyn Wardrop-Moore =

British alpine skier (1932–2026)

Personal information
- Nationality: British
- Born: 29 April 1932 Sevenoaks, Kent, England
- Died: 11 February 2026 (aged 93)

Sport
- Sport: Alpine skiing

Jocelyn Wardrop-Moore (Note: The surname is also spelt Wardrope-Moore.) (29 April 1932 – 11 February 2026) was a British alpine skier. She competed in two events at the 1956 Winter Olympics held in Cortina d'Ampezzo, Italy. She finished 35th of 47 in the slalom and 42nd of 44 in the giant slalom.

Wardrop-Moore married Douglas Murray, a Royal Navy officer. She died on 11 February 2026, at the age of 93.
