= Francisco Viladomat =

Spanish alpine skier (1926–2005)

Personal information
- Nationality: Spanish
- Born: 4 October 1926; Cerdanyola del Vallès, Spain
- Died: 8 May 2005 (aged 79); Andorra la Vella, Andorra

Sport
- Sport: Alpine skiing

Francisco Viladomat (4 October 1926 – 8 May 2005) was a Spanish alpine skier. He competed at the 1952 Winter Olympics and the 1956 Winter Olympics.
