= Johnny Cronshey =

British speed skater

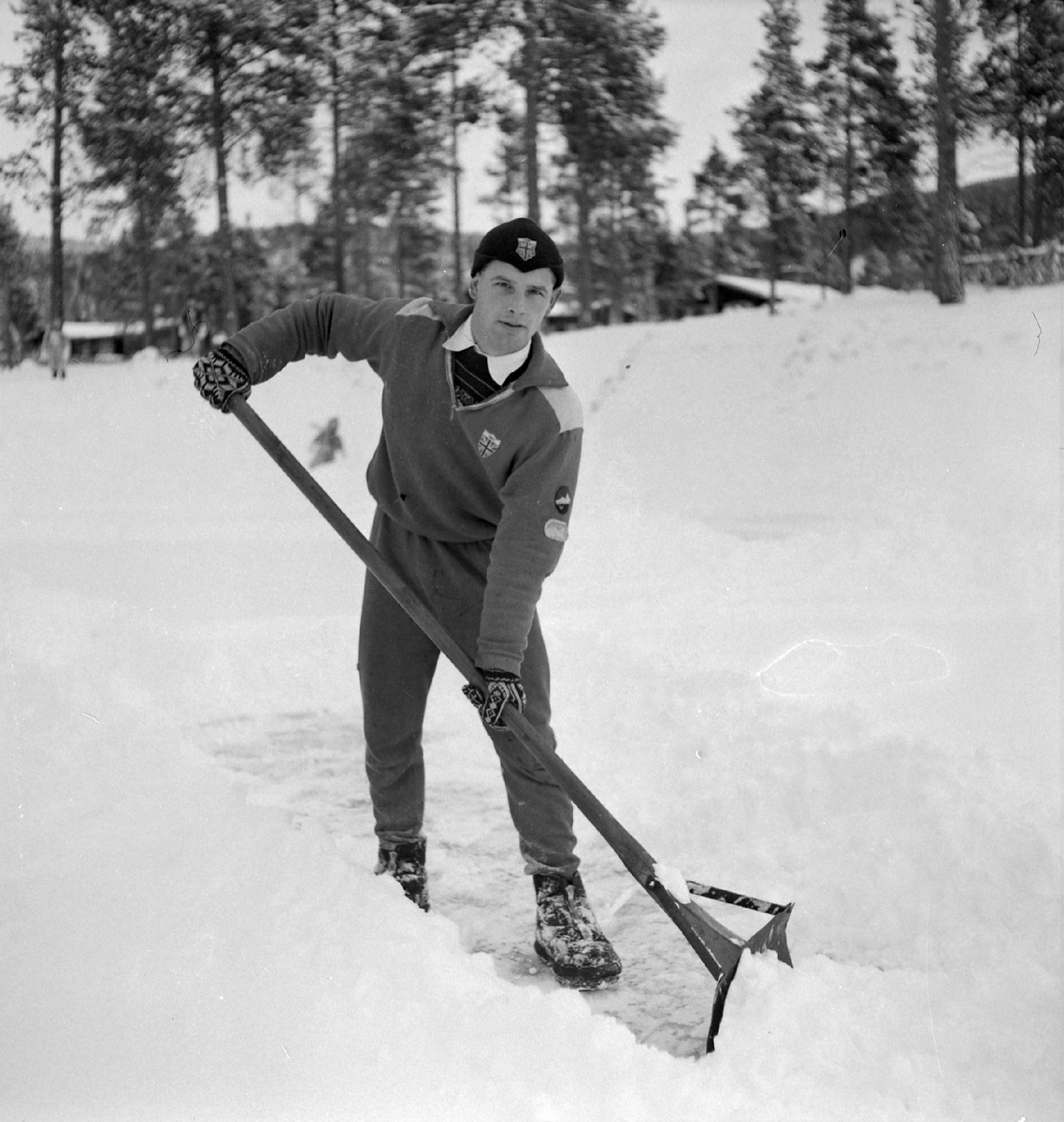
- Cronshey in Dombås, Norway, 1951

Personal information
- Full name: John Dennis Cronshey
- Born: 14 July 1926; Brentford, England
- Died: 15 January 2004 (aged 77); Axminster, Devon, England

Sport
- Sport: Speed skating
- Club: Aldwych Speed Club, London

John Dennis "Johnny" Cronshey (14 July 1926, in Brentford, England – 15 January 2004, in Axminster, Devon, England) was an English speed skater. He competed at the 1948 Winter Olympics and the 1956 Winter Olympics.

Cronshey attended his first international all-round championship at the age of 20. In 1947, he came in 16th at the European Championship. One week later he came ninth in the World Championship.

Cronshey's best international placing was the silver medal at the 1951 World Championship in Davos where he was only beaten by the Norwegian Hjalmar Andersen. It would be another 72 years before the next British Senior International medal would be achieved in 2023, by Ellia Smeding at the 2023 European Sprint Championships.
