= Vora Mackintosh =

British alpine skier (1929–1998)

Personal information
- Full name: Vora June Shaw Stewart (née Mackintosh)
- Nationality: British
- Born: 2 June 1929; London, England
- Died: 30 April 1998 (aged 68); London, England

Sport
- Sport: Alpine skiing

Vora June Shaw Stewart (née Mackintosh) (2 June 1929 – 30 April 1998) was a British alpine skier. She competed in two events at the 1952 Winter Olympics.

A series of photographic portraits of Vora as a child with her family, taken by Bassano Ltd, are held in the collection of the National Portrait Gallery, London.
