= Yoshitaki Hori =

Japanese speed skater (born 1933)

Personal information
- Nationality: Japanese
- Born: 20 April 1933 (age 91); Otchishi, Karafuto, Empire of Japan

Sport
- Sport: Speed skating

Yoshitaki Hori (born 20 April 1933) is a Japanese speed skater. He competed at the 1956 Winter Olympics and the 1960 Winter Olympics.
