= Taketsugu Asazaka =

Japanese speed skater (born 1930)

Personal information
- Nationality: Japanese
- Born: 24 July 1930 Aomori, Japan

Sport
- Sport: Speed skating

Taketsugu Asazaka (born 24 July 1930) is a Japanese speed skater. He competed in four events at the 1956 Winter Olympics.
