= Bertil Eng =

Swedish speed skater

Personal information
- Nationality: Swedish
- Born: 24 January 1930; Stockholm, Sweden
- Died: 14 January 2006 (aged 75); Stockholm, Sweden

Sport
- Sport: Speed skating

Bertil Eng (24 January 1930 – 14 January 2006) was a Swedish speed skater. He competed in two events at the 1956 Winter Olympics.
