= Shinkichi Takemura =

Japanese speed skater (1931–1999)

Personal information
- Nationality: Japanese
- Born: 21 December 1931 Chino, Japan
- Died: 9 December 1999 (aged 67)

Sport
- Sport: Speed skating

Shinkichi Takemura (21 December 1931 – 9 December 1999) was a Japanese speed skater. He competed at the 1956 Winter Olympics and the 1960 Winter Olympics.
