= Raymond Gilloz =

French speed skater (1931–2019)

Personal information
- Full name: Raymond Armand Joseph Gilloz
- Nationality: French
- Born: 27 September 1931; Choisy, France
- Died: 18 March 2015 (aged 83); Chamonix-Mont-Blanc, France

Sport
- Sport: Speed skating

Raymond Gilloz (27 September 1931 – 18 March 2015) was a French speed skater. He competed at the 1956 Winter Olympics and the 1960 Winter Olympics.
