= Gunnar Ström =

Swedish speed skater (1930–2024)

Personal information
- Nationality: Swedish
- Born: 7 October 1930; Eskilstuna, Sweden
- Died: 4 February 2024 (aged 93)

Sport
- Sport: Speed skating

Gunnar Ström (7 October 1930 – 4 February 2024) was a Swedish speed skater. He competed at the 1952 Winter Olympics and the 1956 Winter Olympics. Ström died on 4 February 2024, at the age of 93.
