= Alex Connell (speed skater) =

British speed skater

Personal information
- Full name: Alexander Edmiston Connell
- Nationality: British
- Born: 13 February 1930 Tarbolton, Scotland
- Died: 26 November 2009 (aged 79) Ayr, Scotland

Sport
- Sport: Speed skating

Alexander Edmiston Connell (13 February 1930 – 26 November 2009) was a British speed skater. He competed in three events at the 1956 Winter Olympics.
