= Luis Molné =

Andorran alpine skier

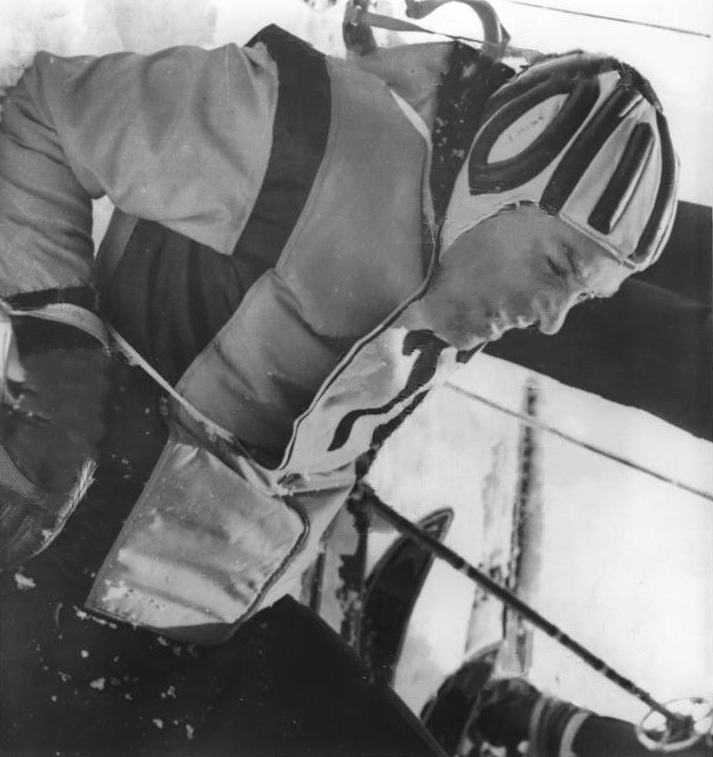
- Molné at the 1960 Olympics

Personal information
- Born: 26 June 1926 (age 100) La Massana, Andorra

Sport
- Sport: Alpine skiing

Luis Molné Armengol (born 26 June 1926) is an Andorran retired alpine skier. He competed for Spain at the 1952 and 1956 Winter Olympics in the downhill, slalom and giant slalom events with the best result of 37th finish in the downhill in 1956. He broke his leg on a preliminary run at the 1960 Winter Olympics and had to withdraw.
