= Douglas Mackintosh =

British alpine skier (1931–2024)

Personal information
- Nationality: British
- Born: 7 March 1931 London, England
- Died: 14 January 2024 (aged 92)

Sport
- Sport: Alpine skiing

Douglas Mackintosh (7 March 1931 – 14 January 2024) was a British alpine skier. In 1947, at the age of 15, he won the British Combined Ski Championship, held that year in Mürren, Switzerland – the first post-war British Ski Championship. He competed in the men's downhill at the 1956 Winter Olympics, but did not finish the race due to a fall.

He read philosophy, politics and economics at University College, Oxford.
