= Alpine skiing at the 1956 Winter Olympics – Men's giant slalom =

Men's giant slalom at the VII Olympic Winter Games
- Alpine skiing
- Venue: Mount Faloria, Cortina d'Ampezzo, Italy
- Date: 29 January 1956
- Competitors: 95 from 29 nations
- Winning time: 3:00.1

Medalists
1st place, gold medalist(s)		Toni Sailer	Austria
2nd place, silver medalist(s)		Andreas Molterer	Austria
3rd place, bronze medalist(s)		Walter Schuster	Austria

The men's giant slalom at the 1956 Winter Olympics was held on 29 January on Mount Faloria, outside Cortina d'Ampezzo, Italy. The course on the Ilio Colli run was 2.660 km (1.65 mi) in length, with a vertical drop of 623 metres (2,044 ft). There were 71 gates for the men to navigate on the course. Ninety-five men from twenty-nine countries entered the race though eight were disqualified. Austrian men swept the medals.

== Results ==
Sunday, 29 January 1956

Rank	Bib #	Competitor	Time	Difference
1st place, gold medalist(s)	18	Toni Sailer (AUT)	3:00.1	—
2nd place, silver medalist(s)	6	Andreas Molterer (AUT)	3:06.3	+6.2
3rd place, bronze medalist(s)	14	Walter Schuster (AUT)	3:07.2	+7.1
4	10	Adrien Duvillard (FRA)	3:07.9	+7.8
5	29	Charles Bozon (FRA)	3:08.4	+8.3
6	3	Ernst Hinterseer (AUT)	3:08.5	+8.4
7	27	Hanspeter Lanig (EUA)	3:08.6	+8.5
8	15	Sepp Behr (EUA)	3:11.4	+11.3
9	12	François Bonlieu (FRA)	3:11.8	+11.7
10	13	Gino Burrini (ITA)	3:12.3	+12.2
11	4	Chiharu Igaya (JPN)	3:15.6	+15.5
11	42	Guido Ghedina (ITA)	3:15.6	+15.5
13	1	Ralph Miller (USA)	3:15.8	+15.9
14	35	Thomas Corcoran (USA)	3:16.0	+15.9
15	30	Brooks Dodge (USA)	3:16.4	+16.3
16	11	Stig Sollander (SWE)	3:17.1	+17.0
17	2	Georges Schneider (SUI)	3:17.3	+17.2
18	28	Roland Blaesi (SUI)	3:18.2	+18.1
19	21	Martin Julen (SUI)	3:18.5	+18.4
20	25	Ake Nilsson (SWE)	3:21.4	+21.3
21	19	Wallace Werner (USA)	3:21.5	+21.4
22	32	Asle Sjåstad (NOR)	3:21.6	+21.5
23	37	Jean Zarycki (POL)	3:22.3	+22.2
24	52	Dino Pompanin (ITA)	3:22.4	+22.3
25	16	Bruno Berrini (ITA)	3:23.1	+23.0
26	49	Peppi Schwaiger (EUA)	3:23.5	+23.4
27	20	Raymond Fellay (SUI)	3:23.9	+23.8
28	9	Włodzimierz Czarniak (POL)	3:24.2	+24.1
29	31	Olle Dalman (SWE)	3:24.9	+24.8
30	7	Gérard Pasquier (FRA)	3:25.6	+25.5
31	26	Jaroslaw Bogdalek (TCH)	3:27.3	+27.2
32	77	Ezven Cermak (TCH)	3:27.7	+27.6
33	51	Aleksandr Filatov (URS)	3:27.8	+27.7
34	41	Gueorgui Dimitrov (BUL)	3:28.9	+28.8
35	24	Josef Marusarz (POL)	3:29.3	+29.2
36	54	Kurt Hennrich (TCH)	3:30.4	+30.3
37	75	Gheorghe Cristoloveanu (ROM)	3:30.5	+30.4
38	45	Vladimir Krajnak (TCH)	3:31.0	+30.9
39	50	André Bertrand (CAN)	3:33.1	+33.0
40	40	Franc Cvenkelj (YUG)	3:33.7	+33.6
41	76	Gueorgui Varochkin (BUL)	3:33.9	+33.8
42	36	Pentti Alonen (FIN)	3:35.0	+34.9
43	65	Kalevi Hakkinen (FIN)	3:36.9	+36.7
44	63	Petar Anguelov (BUL)	3:40.0	+39.9
45	68	Susumu Sugiyama (JPN)	3:40.8	+40.7
46	71	Yury Sharkov (URS)	3:41.8	+41.7
47	74	Ludvig Dornik (YUG)	3:42.4	+42.3
48	43	Beni Obermuller (EUA)	3:42.9	+42.8
49	61	Muzzaffer Demirhan (TUR)	3:44.2	+44.1
50	44	Hans Andresen (NOR)	3:44.7	+44.6
51	72	Joze Ilija (YUG)	3:44.8	+44.7
52	5	Victor Talianov (URS)	3:45.2	+45.1
53	60	Luis Arias (ESP)	3:47.1	+47.0
54	47	Andrzej Roj-Gasienica (POL)	3:48.6	+48.5
55	38	Gennadiy Tchertistchev (URS)	3:48.9	+48.8
56	48	Eysteinn Þórðarson (ISL)	3:49.4	+49.3
56	46	Sandy Whitelaw (GBR)	3:49.4	+49.3
58	79	Nigel Gardner (GBR)	3:51.8	+51.7
59	69	Franz Beck (LIE)	3:52.6	+52.5
60	64	Einar Kristjánsson (ISL)	3:53.4	+53.3
61	39	Billy Day (AUS)	3:56.9	+56.8
62	100	Stefan Kristjansson (ISL)	3:59.1	+59.0
63	83	Osman Yuce (TUR)	3:59.4	+59.3
64	66	Noel Harrison (GBR)	4:00.1	+1:00.0
65	70	Denis Feron (BEL)	4:01.8	+1:01.7
66	73	Robin Hooper (GBR)	4:02.2	+1:02.1
67	104	Leopold Schadler (LIE)	4:03.3	+1:03.2
68	81	Francisco Viladomat (ESP)	4:08.7	+1:08.6
69	58	Tony Aslangul (AUS)	4:09.0	+1:08.9
70	78	Theordor Sele (LIE)	4:09.5	+1:09.4
71	97	Ibrahim Geagea (LIB)	4:10.0	+1:09.9
72	84	Vicente Vera (CHI)	4:10.6	+1:10.5
73	87	Ewarld Eberle (LIE)	4:11.6	+1:11.5
74	82	Nicolae Pandrea (ROM)	4:12.3	+1:12.2
75	59	René Farwig (BOL)	4:15.0	+1:14.9
75	98	Reza Bazargan (IRI)	4:15.0	+1:14.9
77	94	Zeki Şamiloğlu (TUR)	4:16.6	+1:16.5
78	93	Sergio Navarrete (CHI)	4:20.3	+1:20.2
79	62	Arturo Hammersley (CHI)	4:20.4	+1:20.3
80	80	Frank Prihoda (AUS)	4:31.2	+1:31.1
81	102	Jean Kairouz (LIB)	4:40.6	+1:40.5
82	99	Mahmoud Beiglou (IRI)	4:43.9	+1:43.8
83	101	Jaime Talens (ESP)	4:52.2	+1:52.1
84	96	James Walker (AUS)	5:21.0	+2:20.9
85	91	Aris Vatimbella (GRE)	5:23.6	+2:23.5
86	95	Georges Gereidi (LIB)	5:34.8	+2:34.7
87	103	Christos Papageorgiou (GRE)	7:24.5	+4:24.4
—	17	Hans Olofsson (SWE)	DSQ	
—	92	Luis Molné (ESP)	DSQ	
—	89	Steinþór Jakobsson (ISL)	DSQ	
—	90	Alexandros Vouxinos (GRE)	DSQ	
—	88	Benik Amirian (IRI)	DSQ	
—	8	Guttorm Berge (NOR)	DSQ	
—	67	Mahmut Eroğlu (TUR)	DSQ	
—	53	Jan Thorstensen (NOR)	DSQ	

== See also ==
- List of IOC country codes
- 1956 Winter Olympics
