= Alpine skiing at the 1956 Winter Olympics – Men's slalom =

Men's slalom at the VII Olympic Winter Games
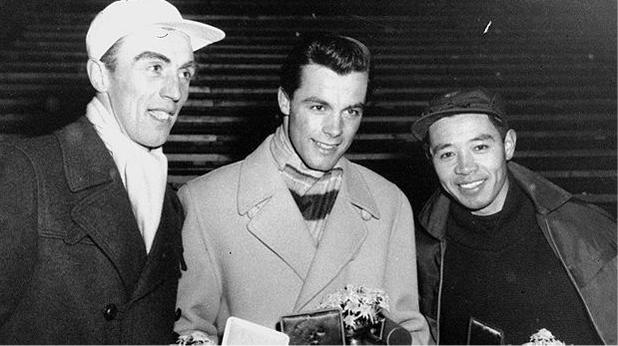
- Medalists Sollander, Sailer, and Igaya
- Venue: Col Druscié, Tofana; Cortina d'Ampezzo, Italy
- Date: 31 January 1956
- Competitors: 89 from 29 nations
- Winning time: 3:14.7

Medalists
1st place, gold medalist(s)		Toni Sailer	Austria
2nd place, silver medalist(s)		Chiharu Igaya	Japan
3rd place, bronze medalist(s)		Stig Sollander	Sweden

The men's slalom at the 1956 Winter Olympics was held on the Col Druscié run on Tuesday, 31 January. The course length was 617 metres (2,024 ft) with a vertical drop of 251 m (823 ft); the first run had 79 gates and the second had 92 gates. Fifty-seven athletes finished both runs and 23 were disqualified during the first run, and eight during the second. Twenty-nine countries were represented and Toni Sailer of Austria won the second of his three gold medals at these Games. Chiharu Igaya won the silver (the only medal for of Japan at these Games) and Stig Sollander of Sweden took the bronze.

U.S. head coach Robert Sheehan filed a protest that Igaya straddled a gate on the second run, a five-second penalty at the time. Although backed up by the Swedish coach, an infraction was not called and after hours of deliberation, Igaya was awarded the silver medal.

== Results ==
Place	Alpine skier	1st run	2nd run	Total	Difference
1st place, gold medalist(s)	Toni Sailer (AUT)	87.3	107.4	194.7	—
2nd place, silver medalist(s)	Chiharu Igaya (JPN)	90.2	108.5	198.7	+4.0
3rd place, bronze medalist(s)	Stig Sollander (SWE)	89.2	111.0	200.2	+5.5
4	Brooks Dodge (USA)	87.6	114.2	201.8	+7.1
5	Georges Schneider (SUI)	89.0	113.6	202.6	+7.9
6	Gerard Pasquier (FRA)	91.0	113.6	204.6	+9.9
7	Charles Bozon (FRA)	92.3	113.9	206.2	+11.5
8	Bernard Perret (FRA)	91.7	114.6	206.3	+11.6
9	Beni Obermueller (EUA)	92.3	115.2	207.5	+12.8
10	René Rey (SUI)	94.1	113.6	207.7	+13.0
11	Raymond Fellay (SUI)	92.8	119.3	212.1	+17.4
12	Othmar Schneider (AUT)	95.8	120.0	215.8	+21.1
13	Gueorgui Dimitrov (BUL)	95.2	120.7	215.9	+21.2
14	Åke Nilsson (SWE)	99.8	117.5	217.3	+22.6
15	Olle Dalman (SWE)	94.2	118.4*	217.6	+22.9
16	Jan Ciaptak-Gasienica (POL)	93.8	126.5	220.0	+25.3
17	Guido Ghedina (ITA)	92.6	128.1	220.7	+26.0
18	Asle Sjåstad (NOR)	96.4	124.5	220.9	+26.2
19	Thomas Corcoran (USA)	97.1	124.2	221.3	+26.6
20	Hans Andresen (NOR)	95.0	126.8	221.8	+27.1
21	Evzen Cermak (TCH)	97.5	125.3	222.8	+28.1
22	Ralph Miller (USA)	94.0	128.8*	227.8	+33.1
23	Andrzej Roj-Gasienica (POL)	110.6	125.2	235.8	+41.1
24	Victor Talianov (URS)	109.2	126.9	236.1	+41.4
25	Karl Zillibiller (EUA)	96.6	138.6*	240.2	+45.5
26	Eysteinn Thordarson (ISL)	104.7	135.6	240.3	+45.6
27	Bruno Burrini (ITA)	96.2	144.2	240.4	+45.7
28	Ludvig Dornik (YUG)	109.3	133.4	242.7	+48.0
29	Jaroslav Bogdalek (TCH)	120.4	126.9	247.3	+52.6
30	Aleksandr Filatov (URS)	93.5	151.0*	249.5	+54.8
31	Luis Arias (ESP)	111.7	141.1	252.8	+58.1
32	Petar Anguelov (BUL)	109.1	147.1	256.2	+1:01.5
33	Susumu Sugiyama (JPN)	111.0	146.0	257.0	+1:02.3
34	Rochus Wagner (EUA)	108.7	143.7*	257.4	+1:02.7
35	Franz Beck (LIE)	124.0	133.8	257.8	+1:03.1
36	Kurt Hennrich (TCH)	113.3	140.2	258.5	+1:03.8
37	Einar Kristjansson (ISL)	110.0	148.6	258.6	+1:03.9
38	Adrien Duvillard (FRA)	87.5	161.4**	258.9	+1:04.2
39	Nicolae Pandrea (ROM)	112.9	141.2*	259.1	+1:04.4
40	Kalevi Häkkinen (FIN)	113.8	140.4*	259.2	+1:04.5
41	Gheorghe Cristoloveanu (ROM)	125.6	135.4	261.0	+1:06.3
42	Franc Cvenkelj (YUG)	118.3	148.6	266.9	+1:12.2
43	Joze Ilija (YUG)	137.5	142.3	279.8	+1:26.1
44	Vicente Vera (CHI)	127.8	159.9	287.7	+1:34.0
45	Theodore Sele (LIE)	136.7	151.1	287.8	+1:34.1
46	Denis Feron (BEL)	132.5	157.0	289.5	+1:36.8
47	Noel Harrison (GBR)	129.7*	156.0	290.7	+1:37.0
48	Peter Seilern (GBR)	128.0	166.7	294.7	+1:41.0
49	Ewald Eberle (LIE)	142.2	159.6	301.8	+1:48.1
50	André Bertrand (CAN)	162.8	140.0	302.8	+1:49.1
51	Arturo Hammersley (CHI)	150.7	152.2	302.9	+1:49.2
52	Jaime Talens (ESP)	145.7	158.5	304.2	+1:50.5
53	Leopold Schadler (LIE)	144.1	165.8	309.9	+1:56.2
54	Frank Prihoda (AUS)	174.3	163.2	337.5	+2:23.8
55	Mahmoud Beiglou (IRI)	171.7*	174.6	351.3	+2:37.6
56	Luis Molne (ESP)	165.5	187.5	353.0	+2:39.3
57	Ibrahim Geagea (LIB)	169.7	198.9	368.6	+2:54.9
—	Martin Julien (SUI)	DSQ			
—	Andreas Molterer (AUT)	DSQ			
—	Buddy Werner (USA)	DSQ			
—	Paride Milianti (ITA)	DSQ			
—	Sandy Whitelaw (GBR)	DSQ			
—	Hans Olofsson (SWE)	DSQ			
—	Jan Zarycki (POL)	DSQ			
—	Pentti Alemen (FIN)	DSQ			
—	Stefan Kristjansson (ISL)	DSQ			
—	Osman Yuce (TUR)	DSQ			
—	Juri Sharkov (URS)	DSQ			
—	Muzzaffer Demirhan (TUR)	DSQ			
—	William Day (AUS)	DSQ			
—	Mahmut Eroglu (TUR)	DSQ			
—	Francisco Viladomat (ESP)	DSQ			
—	Rene Farwig-Guillen (BOL)	DSQ			
—	Aris Vatimbella (GRE)	DSQ			
—	Reza Bazargan (IRI)	DSQ			
—	Jean Kairouz (LIB)	DSQ			
—	Benik Amirian (IRI)	DSQ			
—	Peter Torrens (GBR)	DSQ			
—	Anthony Aslungal (AUS)	DSQ			
—	Zeki Samiloglu (TUR)	DSQ			
—	Sergio Navarrete (CHI)	DNF			
—	Josl Rieder (AUT)		DSQ		
—	Guttorm Berge (NOR)		DSQ		
—	Sepp Behr (EUA)		DSQ		
—	Italo Pedroncelli (ITA)		DSQ		
—	Vladimir Krajnak (TCH)		DSQ		
—	Gueorgui Varockhin (BUL)		DSQ		
—	Vyacheslav Melnikov (URS)		DSQ		
—	Jan Thorstensen (NOR)		DSQ		

* 5 seconds penalty added.
** 10 seconds penalty added.

== See also ==
- List of IOC country codes
- 1956 Winter Olympics
