= Venues of the 1956 Winter Olympics =

For the 1956 Winter Olympics in Cortina d'Ampezzo, Italy, a total of eight sports venues were used. All of the venues used were new or rebuilt. To make use of television coverage for the first time in the Winter Olympics, the cross-country skiing stadium was constructed to allow the best coverage. Five of the venues used for these games would appear in the James Bond film For Your Eyes Only twenty-five years later.

== Venues ==
Venue	Sports	Capacity	Ref.
Apollonio Stadium	Ice hockey	2,000	
Pista Olimpica di Bob - Eugenio Monti	Bobsleigh	4,650	
La pista di Misurina	Speed skating	8,550	
Stadio Olimpico Del Ghiaccio	Figure skating, Ice hockey (final)	12,042	
Lo Stadio della neve	Nordic combined, Cross-country skiing	9,650	
Mount Faloria (Ilio Colli Run)	Alpine skiing (men's giant slalom)	7,920	
Mount Tofana di Mezzo (Olimpia run)	Alpine skiing (men's downhill)	9,830	
Mount Tofana di Mezzo (Canalone run)	Alpine skiing (women's downhill), (women's giant slalom)	6,760	
Col Drusciè (A run)	Alpine skiing (men's slalom), (women's slalom)	12,080 (men), 6,760 (women)	
Trampolino Olimpico Italia	Ski jumping, Nordic combined (ski jumping)	46,152	

== Before the Olympics ==
Cortina has been a tourist resort since the mid-1800s and quickly became internationally known due to frequent visits by European nobility. Following World War I, Cortina emerged as a sports venue. The first World Championship hosted was the FIS Nordic World Ski Championships in 1927. The city would host the FIS Alpine World Ski Championships five years later.

Bobsleigh was first introduced in Cortina in 1905 though the first track 1,200 m (3,900 ft) long would not be completed until eighteen years later. It made its international debut in 1928 during the International University Winter Games (now part of the Winter Universiade). The track would be rebuilt in 1936 to meet the standards of other tracks in St. Moritz, Switzerland and Garmisch-Partenkirchen, Germany. It hosted it first Bobsleigh World Championships (FIBT) in 1937 in the two-man event. The track was renovated again in 1948 after World War II where all of the turns were rebuilt and the track was lengthened to 1,700 m (5,600 ft) long and 16 turns. World Championships between 1937 and the 1956 Games took place in 1939 (four-man), 1950, and 1954. Cortina was awarded the 1944 Winter Olympics in 1939, but the games were cancelled due to World War II.

== During the Olympics ==
Lo Stadio della neve (English: The Snow Stadium) was one of the first venues constructed to meet the needs of television station RAI, Italy's national broadcaster. The Stadium was constructed in an oblong 250 by 44 m (820 by 144 ft) area in an east-west direction with the Grand Stands facing south.

Prior to the construction of La pista di Misurna (English: Misurna skating oval), the International Skating Union (ISU) had expressed concern over the upkeep, but after a test event the year before the 1956 Games, changed their minds. A sports official for the ISU later stated that the track was easier to maintain than that of Davos, Switzerland even though the track was made of natural ice.

== After the Olympics ==
When Squaw Valley, California in the United States did not construct a bobsleigh track for the 1960 Winter Olympics, the track served as host for the bobsleigh World Championships in 1960. The death of West German bobsledder Toni Pensperger at the FIBT World Championships 1966 during the four-man event forced the track to improve safety standards. Another Bobsleigh World Championships would not take place until 1981. During the 1981 championships, American bobsledder James Morgan was killed during the four-man event. After Morgan's death, and the death of a stuntman during the filming of the James Bond 1981 film For Your Eyes Only, the track length was reduced to 1,350 m (4,430 ft) and 13 curves. The track would host the Bobsleigh World Championships twice more in 1989 and 1999. Following the death of Cortina native Eugenio Monti in December 2003, the track was renamed in Monti's honor. In June 2007, the track was selected to host the 2011 world championships. The track withdrew their hosting of the 2011 championships in February 2009 due to issues with the city of Cortina over the track itself. The bobsleigh track is current inactive, but can be re-activated when needed.

The ski jump was used as a World Cup venue six times between 1979 and 1985. Its last World Cup competition in 1985 was won by Norway's Roger Ruud. The last known competition of any kind at the jump took place in 1990.

Stadio Olympica is open to the general public and also serves as home to SG Cortina's ice hockey team.

Cortina was first used as an alpine skiing World Cup event in 1981. It was an annual stop for women's alpine skiing from the 1992–93 to the 2008–09 seasons.

Besides the bobsleigh track in For Your Eyes Only, other venues that appear in the movie are the ski jump, Tofane, Apollonino Stadium, and Stadio Olympica.

The only venue to be demolished was the temporary Lo Stadio della neve with all other venues still existing or in use.
