= Australia at the 1956 Winter Olympics =

- IOC code: AUS
- NOC: Australian Olympic Committee
- Website: www.olympics.com.au

in Cortina d'Ampezzo
- Competitors: 8 in 3 sports
- Medals: Gold 0 Silver 0 Bronze 0 Total 0

Winter Olympics appearances (overview)
- 1936; 1948; 1952; 1956; 1960; 1964; 1968; 1972; 1976; 1980; 1984; 1988; 1992; 1994; 1998; 2002; 2006; 2010; 2014; 2018; 2022; 2026

Australia sent a delegation to compete at the 1956 Winter Olympics from the 26 January to 5 February 1956 in Cortina d'Ampezzo, Italy. This was the nation's third appearance at the Winter Olympic Games with their last appearance being in 1952.

Australia delegation consisted of eight competitors in three sports. Australia competed in alpine skiing, figure skating and speed skating. Australia best result from the 1960 Games was a seventh-place finish from Colin Hickey in the men's 500 metres and men's 1500 metres speed skating. This performance also was Australia's best result until the 1976 Winter Olympics, where Colin Coates came sixth in men's 10000 metres speed skating.

== Background ==
The Australian Olympic Committee was formed on 1 January 1895 with the nation making their debut at the first Olympics in Athens with Teddy Flack being the first representative of the nation. This was the nation's third appearance at a Winter Olympics. It was also the 15th overall Olympics that Australia had sent a delegation in. The 1956 Winter Olympics was held at Cortina d'Ampezzo in Italy and took place from the 26 January to 6 February: a total of 821 athletes competed from 32 nations. The Australian delegation consist of eight athletes, five in the alpine skiing, two in the figure skating and one in the speedskating.

== Alpine skiing ==
Men

Athlete	Event	Run 1		Run 2		Final/Total		
Athlete	Event	Time	Rank	Time	Rank	Time	Diff	Rank
Bill Day	Downhill	—N/a				4:02.0	+1:09.8	35
Bill Day	Giant slalom	—N/a				3:56.9	+56.8	61
Bill Day	Slalom	Did not finish						
Tony Aslangul	Giant slalom	—N/a				4:09.0	+1:08.9	69
Tony Aslangul	Slalom	Did not finish						
Frank Prihoda	Giant slalom	—N/a				4:31.2	+1:39.0	80
Frank Prihoda	Slalom	2:54.3	60	2:43.2	51	5:37.5	+2:22.8	54
James Walker	Giant slalom	—N/a				5:21.0	+2:20.9	84

Women

Athlete	Event	Race 1		Race 2		Total	
Athlete	Event	Time	Rank	Time	Rank	Time	Rank
Christine Davy	Downhill					2:01.6	39
Christine Davy	Giant slalom					2:17.3	37
Christine Davy	Slalom	1:26.1	32	1:21.5	29	2:47.6	33

== Figure skating ==
Athlete(s)	Event	CF	FS	TO	Points	Rank
Allan Ganter	Men's	13	13	114	1191.72	13
Charles Keeble	Men's	16	14	137	1115.39	16

== Speed skating ==
Athlete	Event	Final	
Athlete	Event	Time	Rank
Colin Hickey	500 m	41.9	7
Colin Hickey	1500 m	2:11.8	7
Colin Hickey	5000 m	8:10.0	14
Colin Hickey	10000 m	17:45.6	27

== See also ==
- Australia at the Winter Olympics
