= André Bertrand =

André Bertrand may refer to:

- André Bertrand (lawyer)
- André Bertrand (alpine skier)
