= List of Olympic venues in alpine skiing =

For the Winter Olympics, there are 37 venues that have been or will be used for alpine skiing. Most of the events took place in multiple locations at the Winter Olympics, though a single venue for all events has been used in recent Games in an effort to lessen economic and environmental concerns.

Games	Venue	Other sports hosted at venues for those games	Capacity	Ref.
1936 Garmisch-Partenkirchen	Gudiberg (combined-slalom)	None	24,000	
1936 Garmisch-Partenkirchen	Kreuzjoch (combined - downhill)	None	Not listed.	
1936 Garmisch-Partenkirchen	Kreuzeck (downhill finish line)	None	17,000	
1948 St. Moritz	Piz Nair	None	Not listed.	
1952 Oslo	Norefjell (downhill, giant slalom)	None	Not listed	
1952 Oslo	Rødkleiva (slalom)	None	Not listed	
1956 Cortina d'Ampezzo	Mount Faloria (giant slalom)	None	7,920 (men)	
1956 Cortina d'Ampezzo	Mount Tofana (downhill, slalom)	None	12,080 (men's slalom)	
1960 Squaw Valley	Squaw Valley Ski Resort	None	9,650	
1964 Innsbruck	Axamer Lizum (all but men's downhill)	None	Not listed	
1964 Innsbruck	Patscherkofel (men's downhill)	None	Not listed.	
1968 Grenoble	Chamrousse (men)	None	Not listed.	
1968 Grenoble	Recoin de Chamrousse (women)	None	Not listed.	
1972 Sapporo	Mount Eniwa Downhill Course (downhill)	None	Not listed.	
1972 Sapporo	Mt. Teine Alpine Skiing courses (giant slalom, slalom)	None	Not listed.	
1976 Innsbruck	Axamer Lizum (all but men's downhill)	None	Not listed.	
1976 Innsbruck	Patscherkofel (men's downhill)	None	Not listed	
1980 Lake Placid	Whiteface Mountain	None	Not listed	
1984 Sarajevo	Bjelašnica (men)	None	Not listed.	
1984 Sarajevo	Jahorina ski resort (women)	None	10,000	
1988 Calgary	Nakiska	Freestyle skiing (demonstration)	Not listed.	
1992 Albertville	Les Ménuires (men's slalom)	None	Not listed.	
1992 Albertville	Méribel (women)	None	3,000	
1992 Albertville	Val-d'Isère (men's downhill, super-giant slalom, giant slalom, combined)	None	Not listed.	
1994 Lillehammer	Lillehammer Olympic Alpine Centre Hafjell (combined, giant slalom, slalom)	None	Not listed.	
1994 Lillehammer	Lillehammer Olympic Alpine Centre Kvitfjell (combined, downhill, super giant slalom)	None	Not listed.	
1998 Nagano	Happōone Resort (combined, downhill, super-g)	None	20,000	
1998 Nagano	Mount Higashidate (giant slalom)	None	20,000	
1998 Nagano	Mount Yakebitai (slalom)	Snowboarding (giant slalom)	20,000	
2002 Salt Lake City	Deer Valley (slalom)	Freestyle skiing	13,400	
2002 Salt Lake City	Park City Mountain Resort (giant slalom)	Snowboarding	16,000	
2002 Salt Lake City	Snowbasin (combined, downhill, super-g)	None	22,500	
2006 Turin	San Sicario Fraiteve (women's combined (downhill), downhill, super-g)	None	6,160	
2006 Turin	Sestriere Borgata (men's combined (downhill), downhill, super-g)	None	6,800	
2006 Turin	Sestriere Colle (combined (slalom), giant slalom, slalom)	None	7,900	
2010 Vancouver	Whistler Creekside	None	7,600	
2014 Sochi	Rosa Khutor Alpine Resort	None	10,000	
2018 PyeongChang	Jeongseon Alpine Centre (combined, downhill, super-g)	None	18,000	
2018 PyeongChang	Yongpyong Alpine Centre (giant slalom, slalom)	None	18,000	
2022 Beijing	Yanqing National Alpine Skiing Centre	None	4,800	
2026 Milan-Cortina	Olimpia delle Tofane (women's)	None	1,000 (main grandstand)	
2026 Milan-Cortina	Pista Stelvio (men's)	Ski mountaineering	Not listed.	
2030 French Alps	Courchevel (men's)	None	Not listed.	
2030 French Alps	Méribel (women's)	None	Not listed.	
2034 Utah	Snowbasin Resort	None	19,000	

== Gallery of venues ==
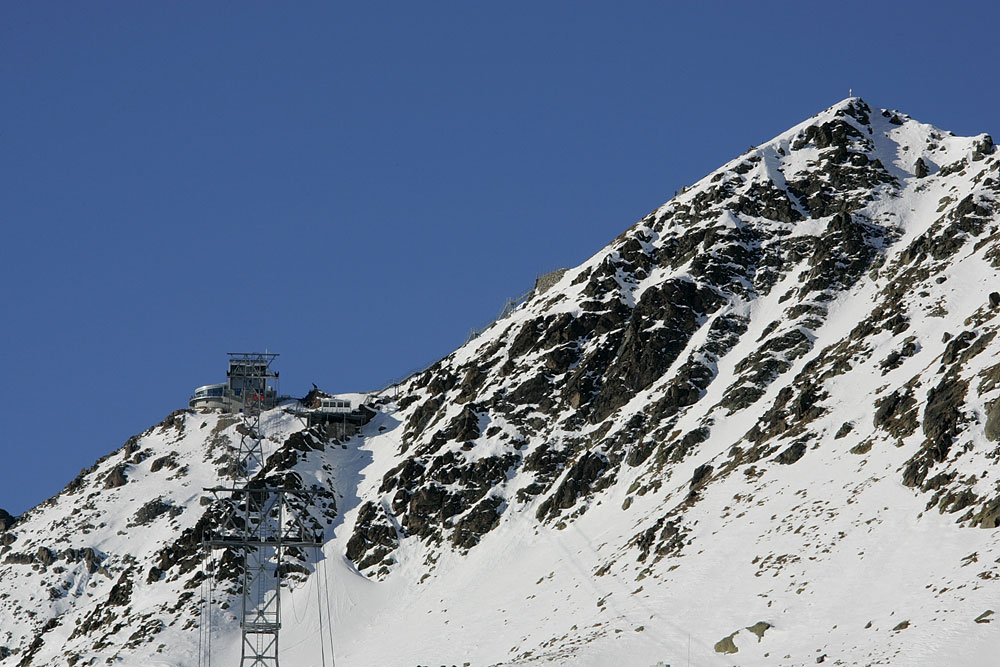
Piz Nair hosted alpine skiing at the 1948 Winter Olympics in St. Moritz.

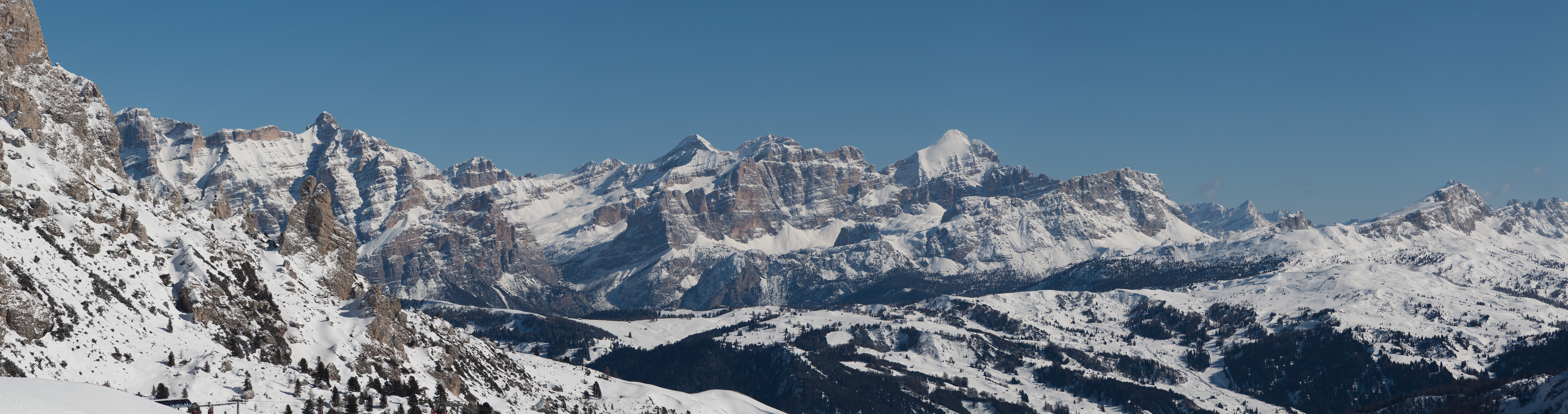
Mount Tofana hosted the downhill and giant slalom events at the 1956 Winter Olympics in Cortina d'Ampezzo.

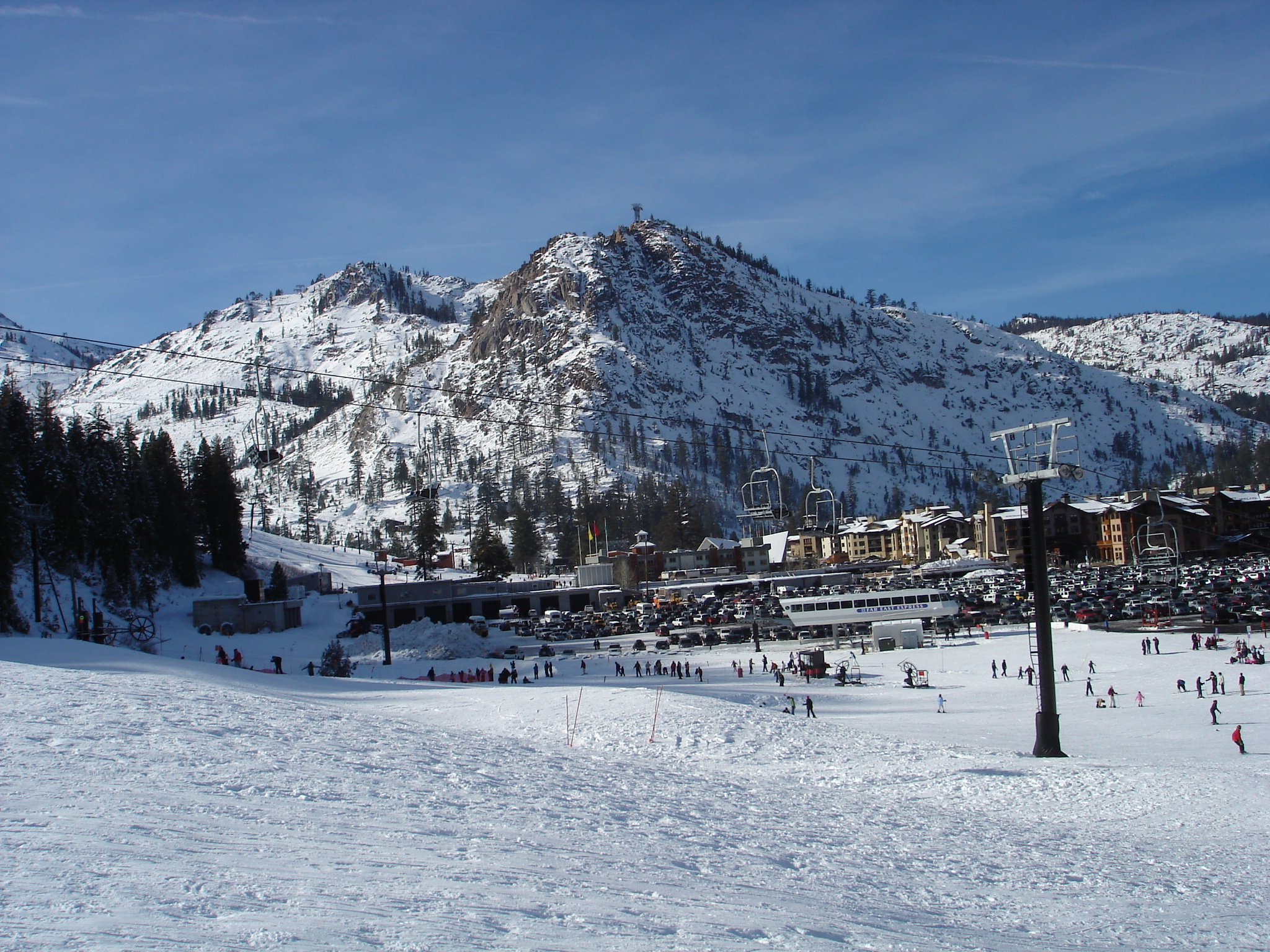
Palisades Tahoe hosted alpine skiing at the 1960 Winter Olympics in Squaw Valley.

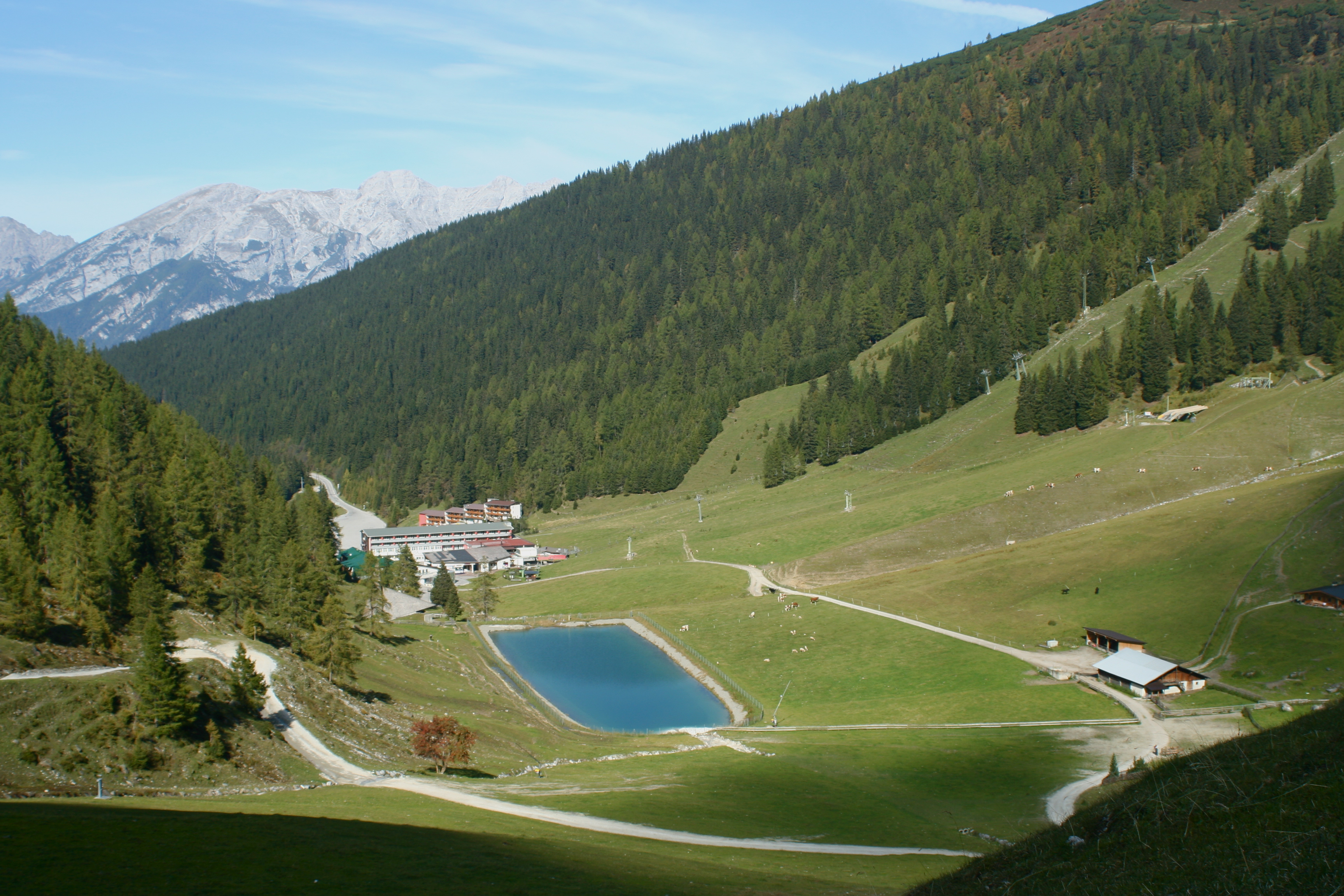
Axamer Lizum hosted alpine skiing at the 1964 and 1976 Winter Olympics in Innsbruck.

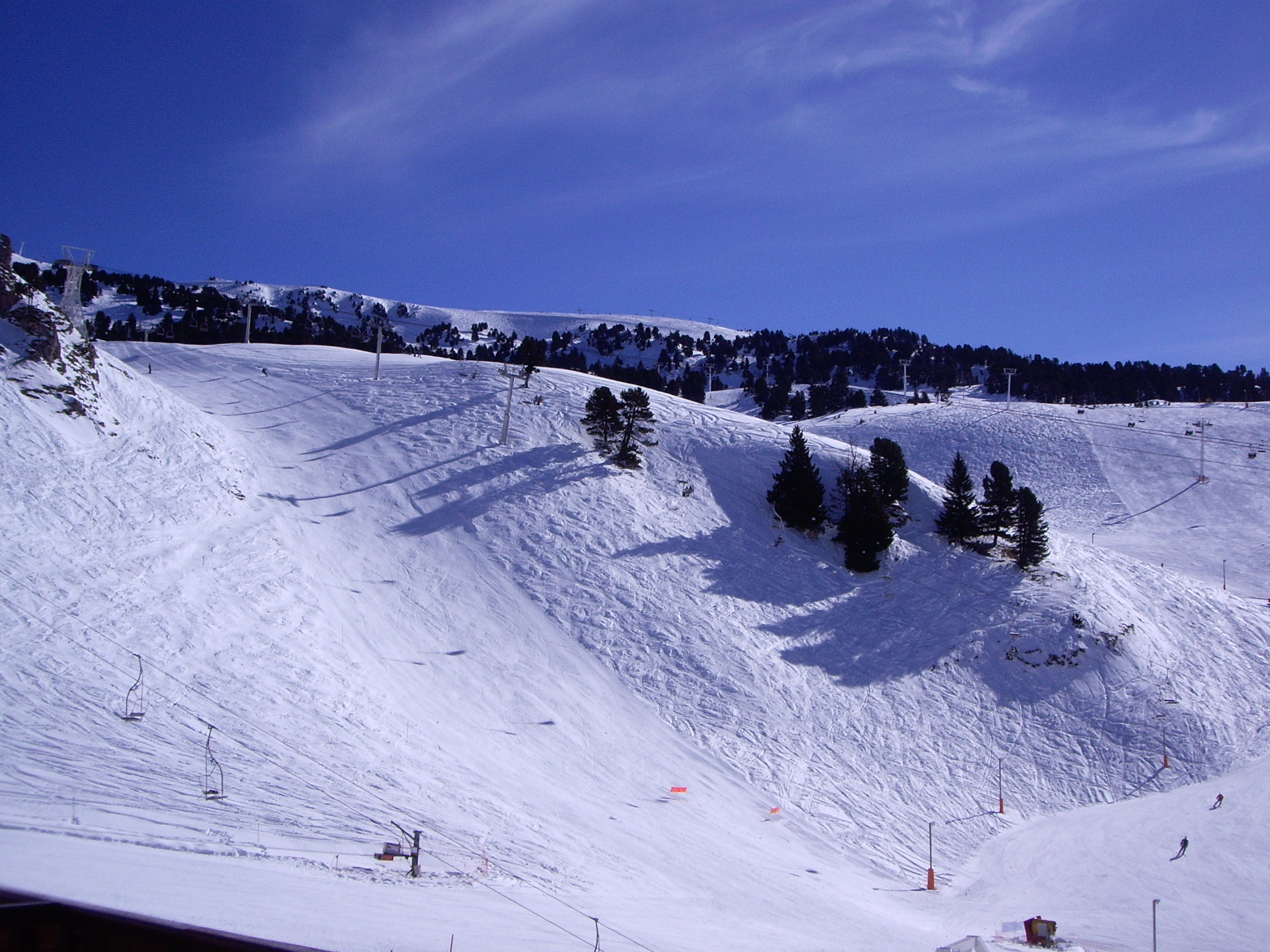
Chamrousse hosted alpine skiing at the 1968 Winter Olympics in Grenoble.

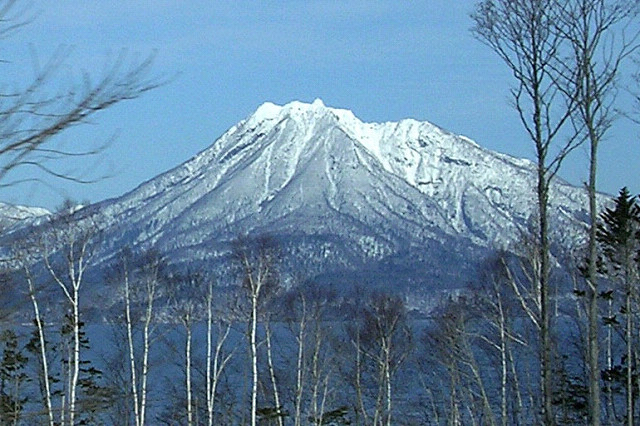
The Mount Eniwa Downhill Course hosted alpine skiing at the 1972 Winter Olympics in Sapporo.

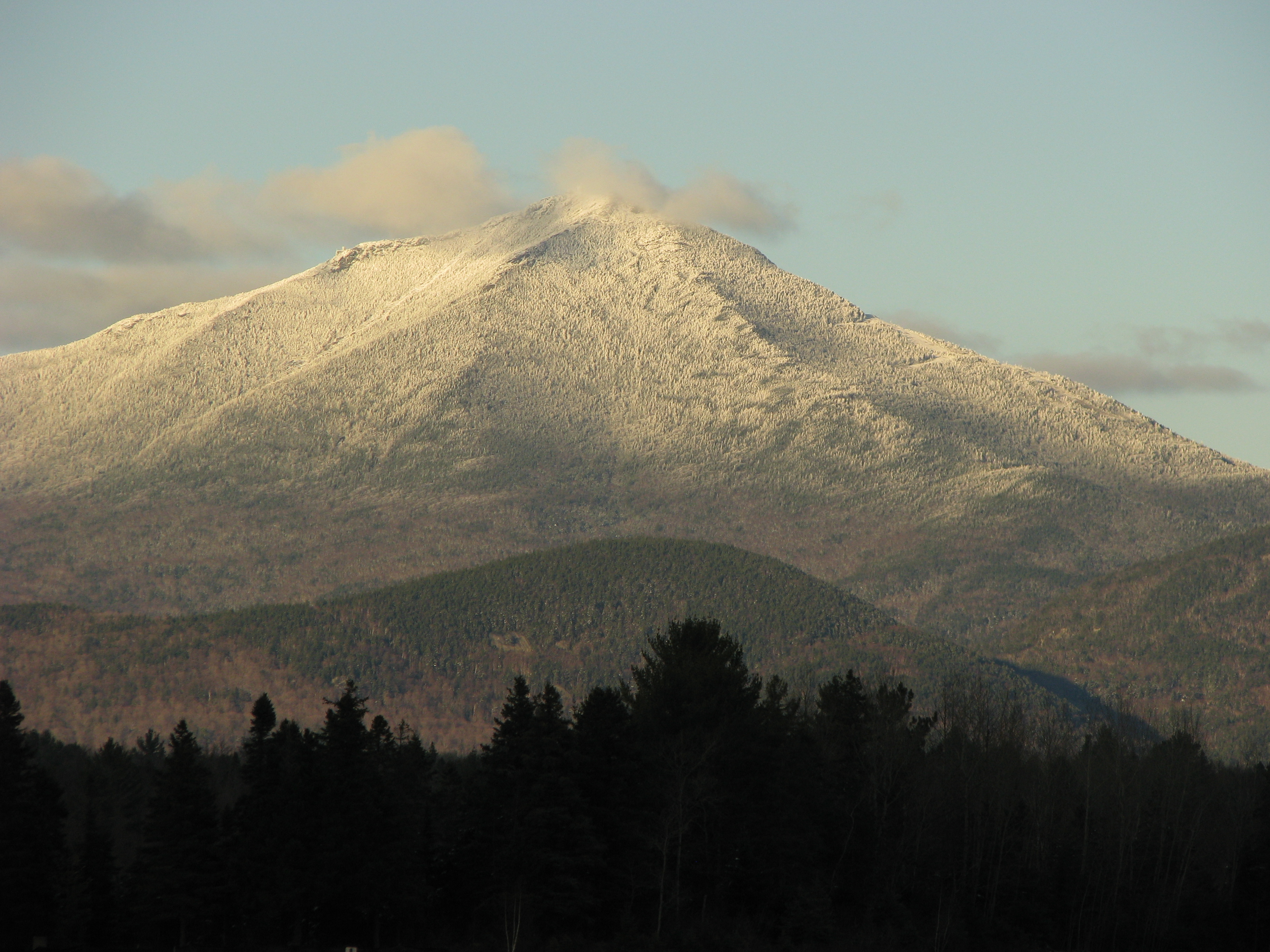
Whiteface Mountain hosted alpine skiing at the 1980 Winter Olympics in Lake Placid.

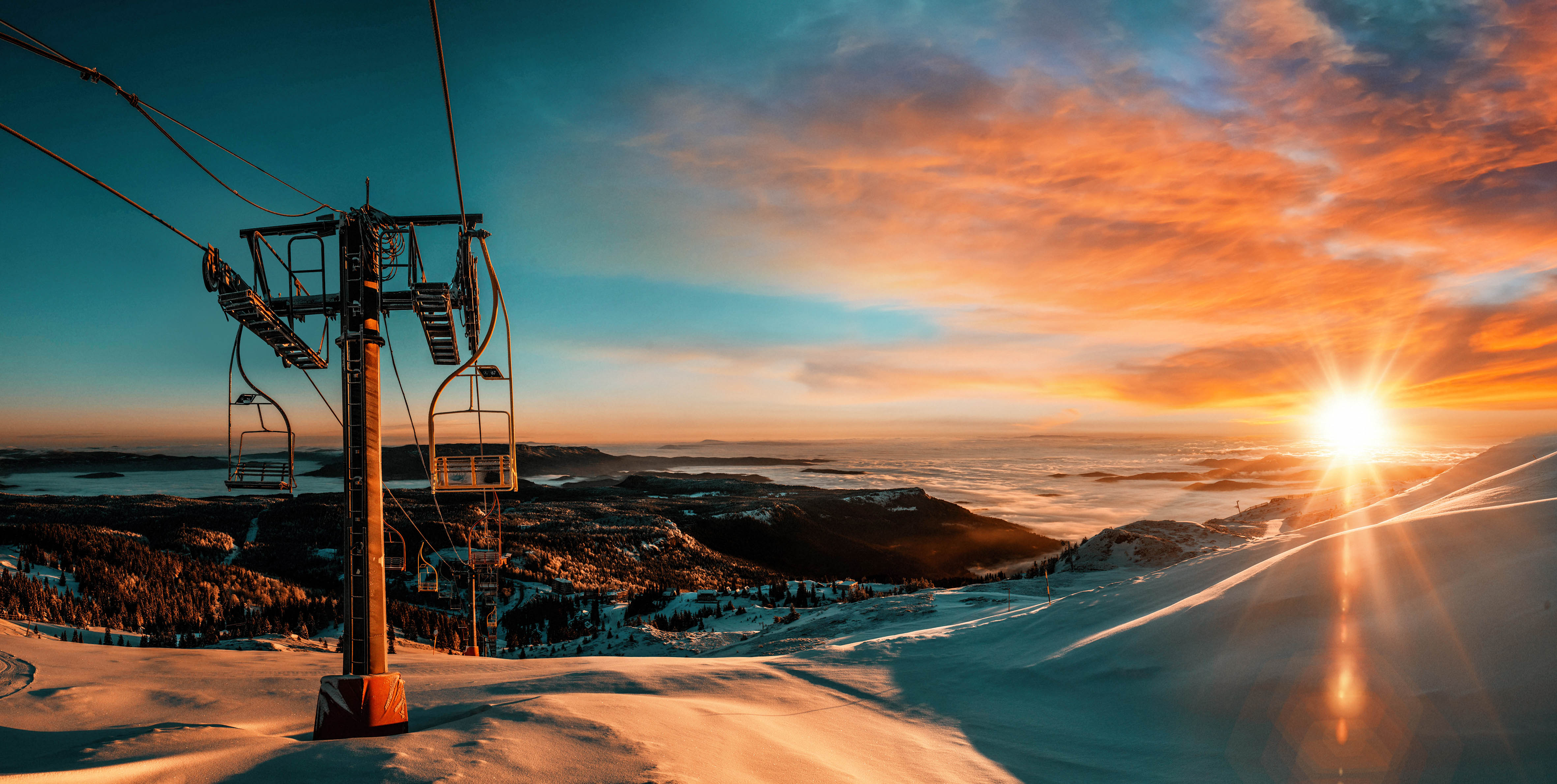
Jahorina Ski Resort hosted women’s alpine skiing at the 1984 Winter Olympics in Sarajevo.

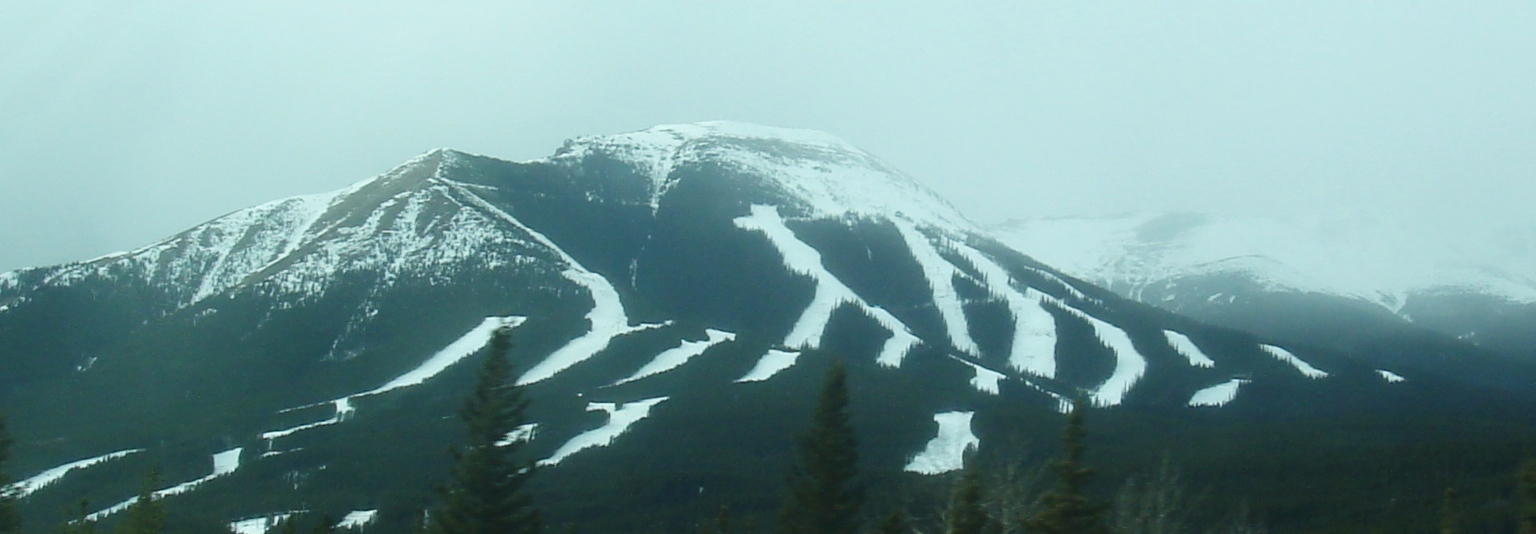
Nakiska hosted alpine skiing at the 1988 Winter Olympics in Calgary

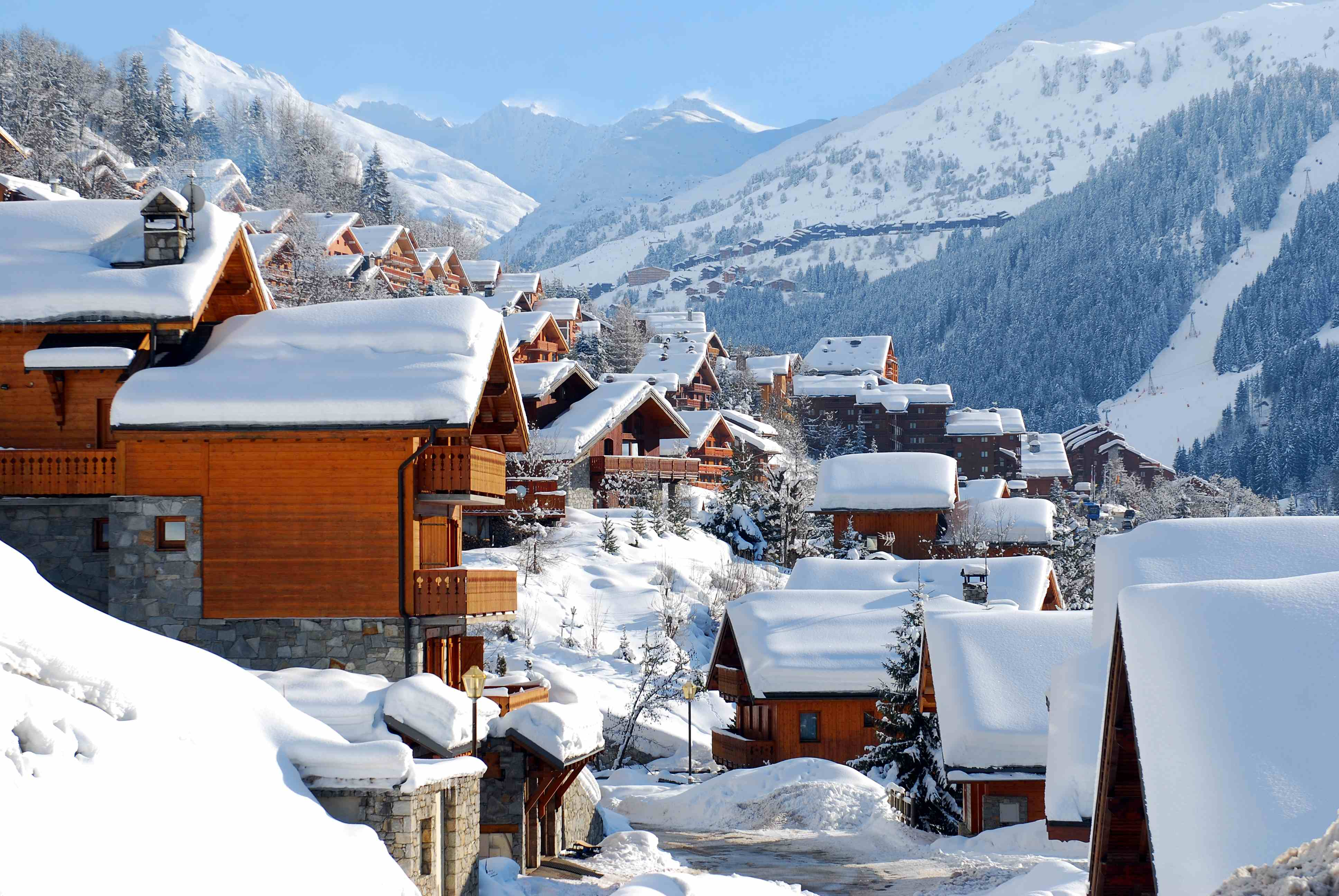
Méribel hosted women’s alpine skiing at the 1992 Winter Olympics in Albertville and will do so again at the 2030 Winter Olympics in the French Alps.

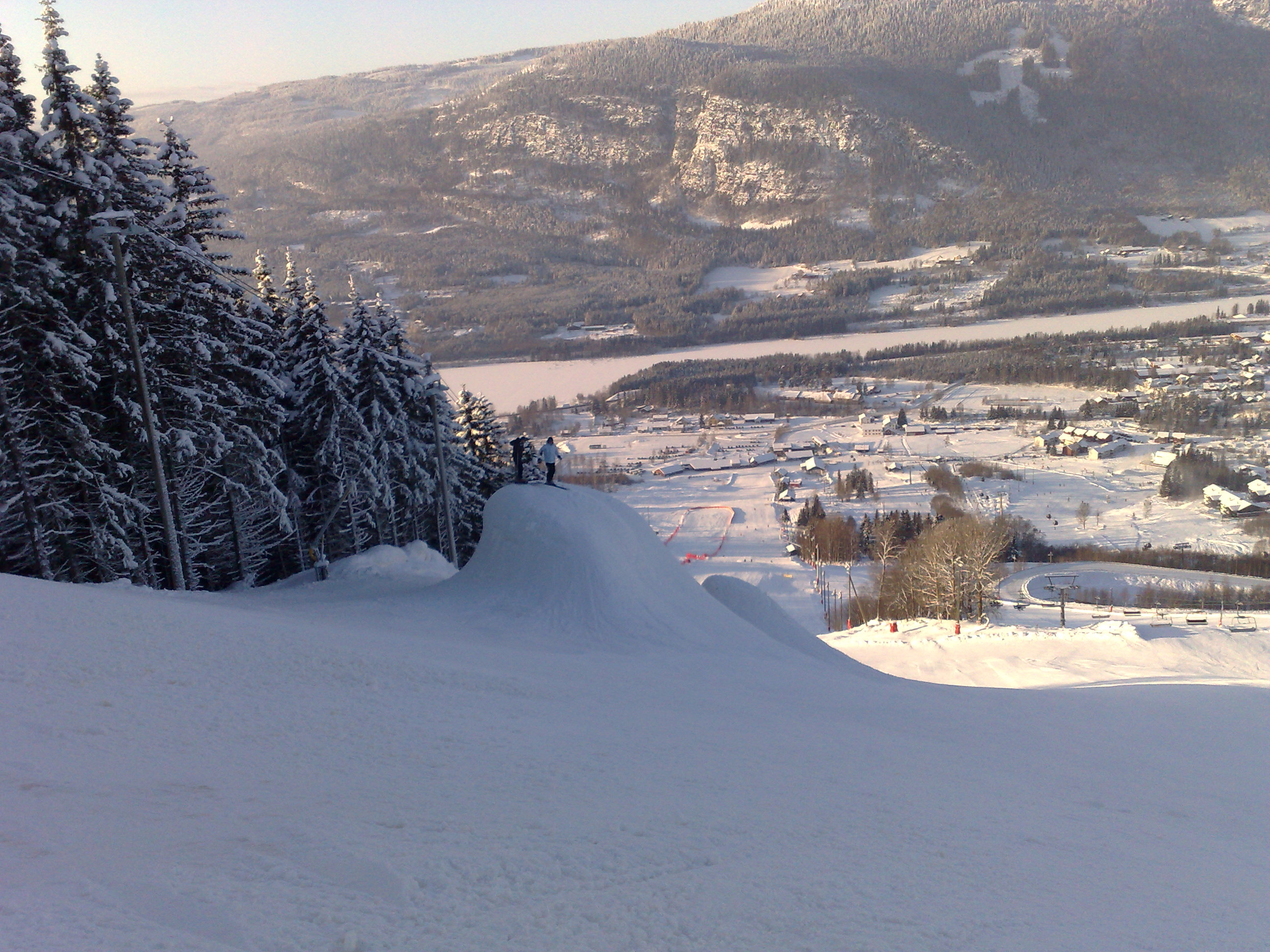
Hafjell hosted combined, giant slalom and slalom at the 1994 Winter Olympics in Lillehammer.

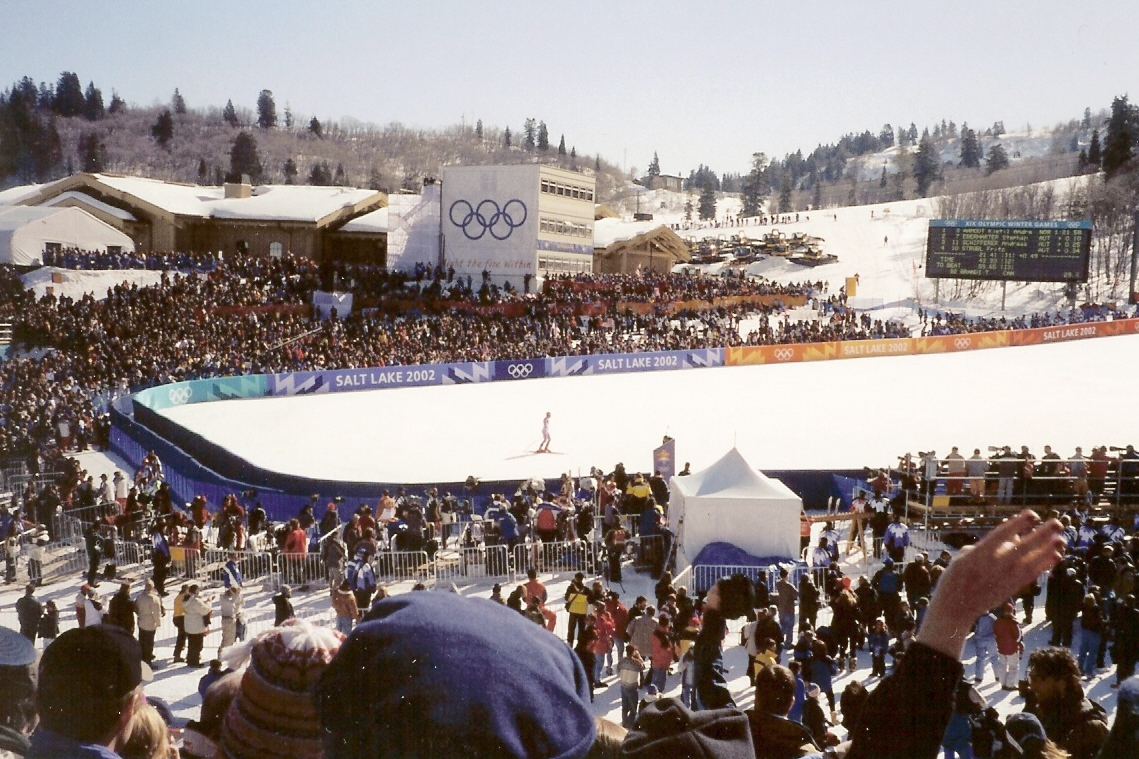
Snowbasin Resort hosted alpine skiing at the 2002 Winter Olympics in Salt Lake City and will do so again in 2034.

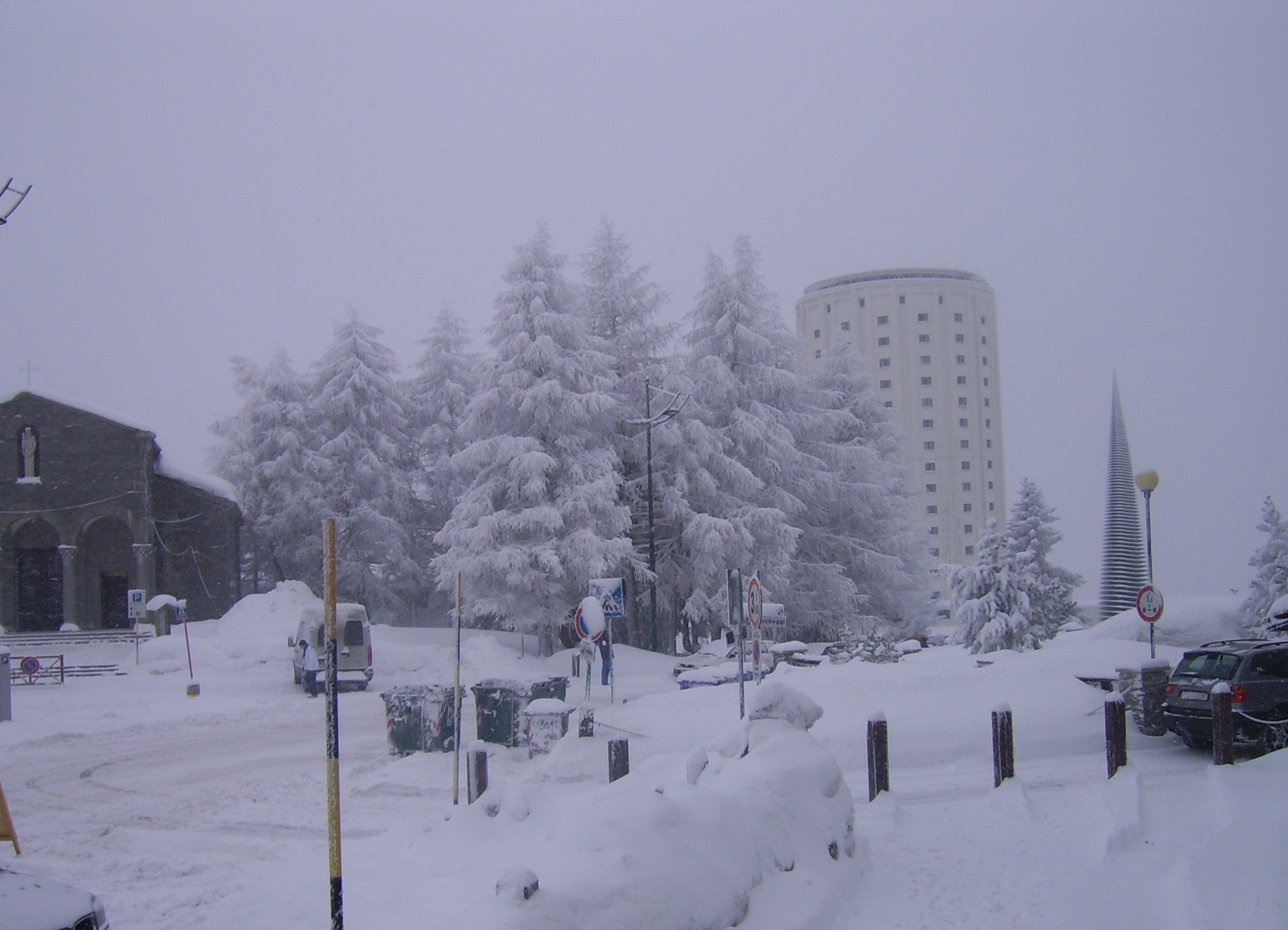
Sestriere hosted men’s alpine skiing at the 2006 Winter Olympics in Turin.

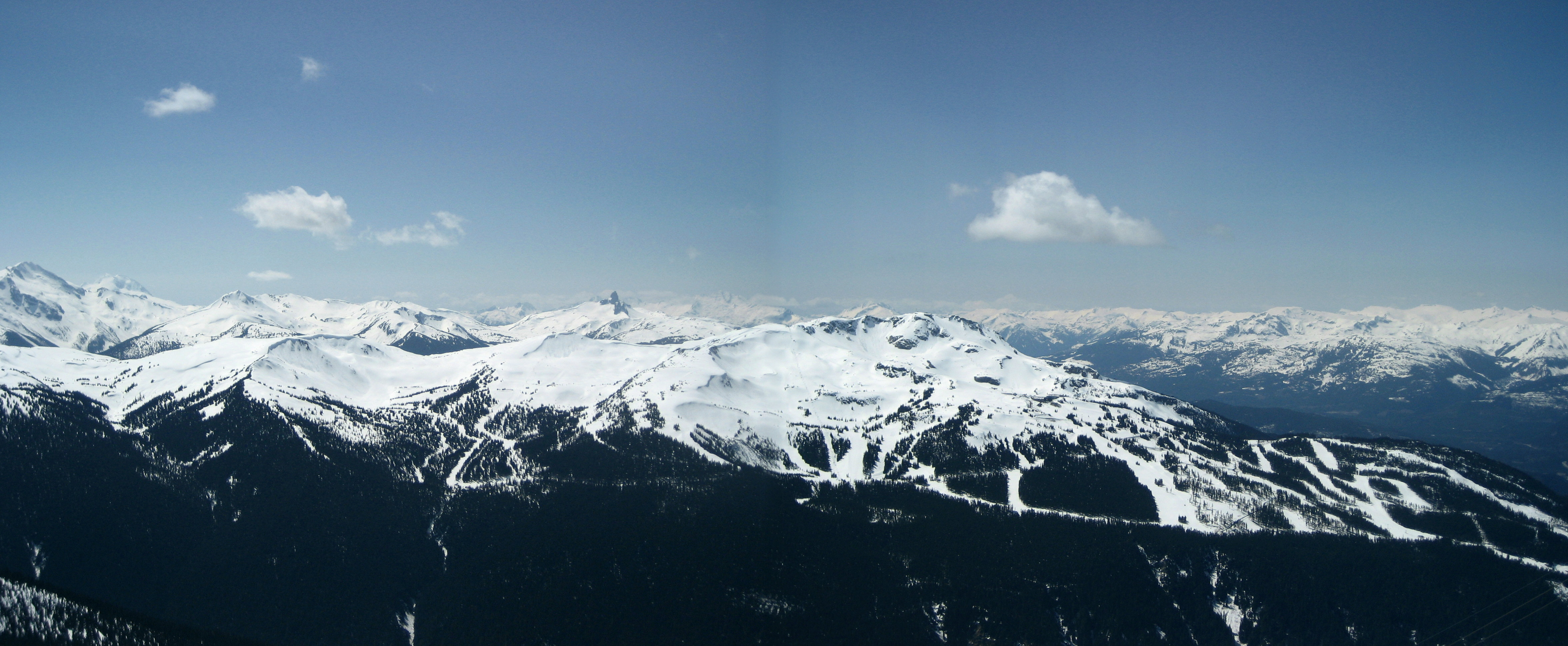
Whistler Blackcomb hosted alpine skiing at the 2010 Winter Olympics in Vancouver.

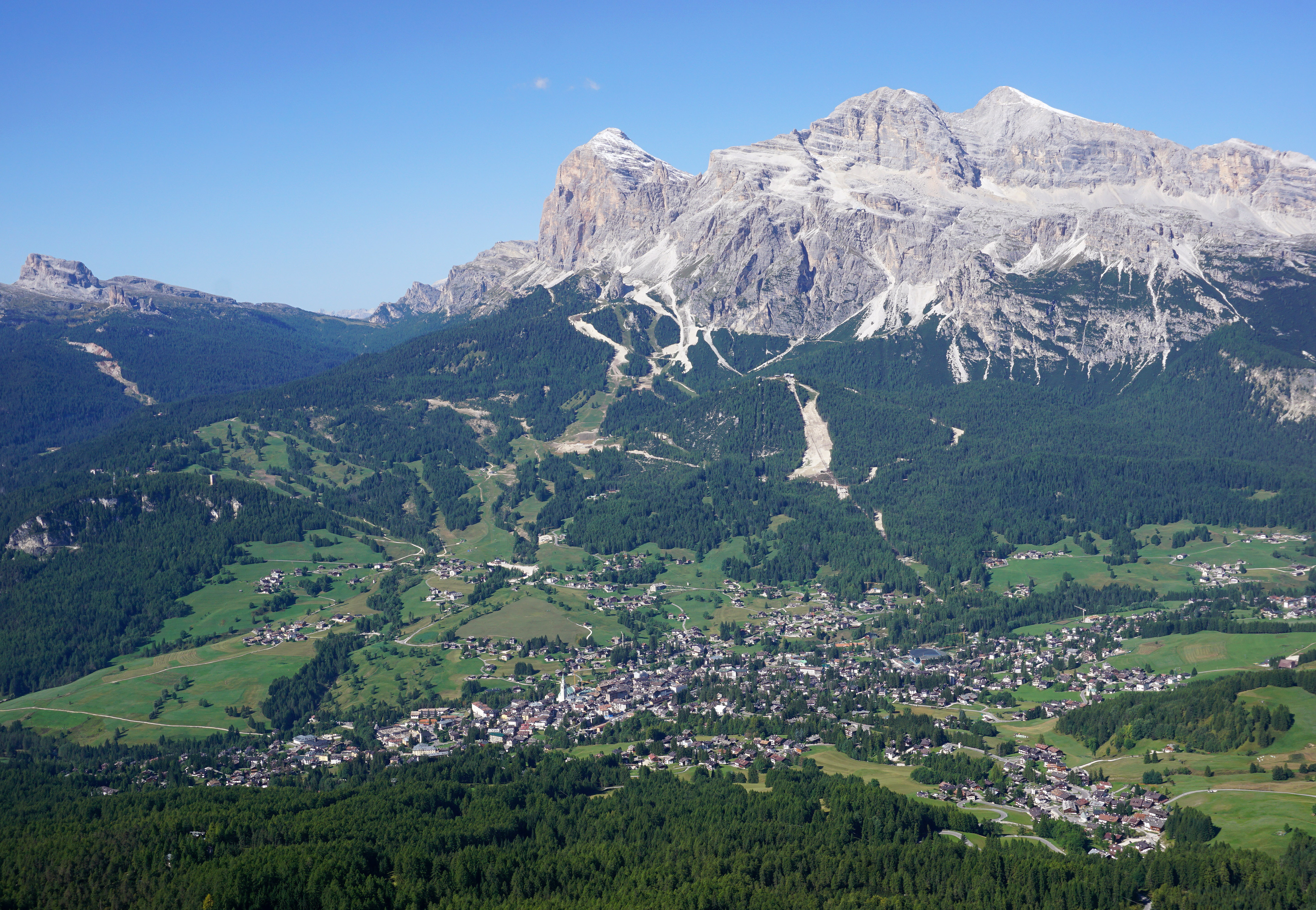
Olimpia delle Tofane hosted women’s alpine skiing at the 2026 Winter Olympics in Cortina d’Ampezzo.
