= Vyacheslav Melnikov =

Vyacheslav Melnikov may refer to:

- Vyacheslav Melnikov (alpine skier) (born 1931), Soviet Olympic skier
- Vyacheslav Melnikov (footballer, born 1954), Russian football player (senior career 1975–1986) and coach (1991–2008)
- Vyacheslav Melnikov (footballer, born 1975), Russian football player (senior career 1991–2007)
