= Ralph Miller (alpine skier) =

American skier (1933–2021)

Personal information
- Nationality: American
- Born: September 23, 1933 Hanover, New Hampshire, U.S.
- Died: November 21, 2021 (aged 88) Lexington, Massachusetts, U.S.

Sport
- Sport: Alpine skiing

Ralph English Miller Jr. (September 23, 1933 – November 21, 2021) was an American alpine ski racer. At age 22, he competed in three events at the 1956 Winter Olympics in Cortina d'Ampezzo, Italy, when he was one of the top downhill racers in the world. During those Olympics, he was on the cover of Sports Illustrated; he was the third racer on the downhill very icy course, but fell hard and woke up in a toboggan. Two years earlier, Miller had competed in two events at the 1954 World Championships in Åre, Sweden.

Born and raised in Hanover, New Hampshire, he raced for hometown Dartmouth College and won the NCAA overall skimeister title in 1951 and in 1957.

In 1955, Miller set a speed skiing world record of 108.7 miles per hour (175 km/h) in Portillo, Chile. He first went to Chile four years earlier, one of the first American ski racers to off-season train in South America. The speed record stood for fifteen years.

Miller served in the U.S. Army's Mountain Training Command in the mid-1950s, graduated from Harvard Medical School in 1961 and later taught at the University of Kentucky College of Medicine in Lexington. His wife, Pam Miller, was the mayor of Lexington for ten years.

== World Championship results ==
Year	Age	Slalom	Giant Slalom	Super-G	Downhill	Combined
1954	20	—	not run	31	48	—
1956	22	22	not run	13	DSQ	—

From 1948 through 1980, the Winter Olympics were also the World Championships for alpine skiing.
At the World Championships from 1954 through 1980, the combined was a "paper race" using the results of the three events (DH, GS, SL).
