= Robin Hooper (alpine skier) =

British alpine skier (born 1934)

Personal information
- Nationality: British
- Born: 14 June 1934 (age 90); London, England

Sport
- Sport: Alpine skiing

Robin Mackay Hooper (born 14 June 1934) is a British alpine skier. He competed in the men's giant slalom at the 1956 Winter Olympics.
