= Bernard Perret =

French alpine skier

Personal information
- Nationality: French
- Born: 5 June 1933 (age 93) Chamonix, France

Sport
- Sport: Alpine skiing

Bernard Perret (born 5 June 1933) is a French alpine skier. He competed in the men's slalom at the 1956 Winter Olympics.
