= Steinþór Jakobsson =

Icelandic alpine skier (1931–1996)

Personal information
- Nationality: Icelandic
- Born: 7 November 1931 Ísafjörður, Iceland
- Died: 19 March 1996 (aged 64) Gulf of Mexico

Sport
- Sport: Alpine skiing

Steinþór Jakobsson (7 November 1931 – 19 March 1996) was an Icelandic alpine skier. He competed in the men's giant slalom at the 1956 Winter Olympics.
