= Peter Seilern =

British alpine skier (born 1936)

Personal information
- Nationality: British
- Born: 7 February 1936 (age 89); Vienna, Austria

Sport
- Sport: Alpine skiing

Peter Seilern (born 7 February 1936) is a British alpine skier. He competed in the men's slalom at the 1956 Winter Olympics.
