= Asle Sjåstad =

Norwegian alpine skier (1930–2009)

Asle Sjåstad (6 January 1930 – 22 May 2009) was a Norwegian alpine skier.

He took eight national championships between 1955 and 1960, representing the club Geilo IL. He finished fifth at the FIS Alpine World Ski Championships 1956, and at the 1956 Winter Olympics he acquired a fourteenth place in the downhill event, a 22nd place in the giant slalom event and an eighteenth place in the slalom event.

He died in May 2009 in Geilo.
