= Peter Torrens =

British alpine skier (1934–2007)

Personal information
- Nationality: British
- Born: 28 February 1934
- Died: October 2007; Launceston, Tasmania, Australia

Sport
- Sport: Alpine skiing

Peter Torrens (28 February 1934 – October 2007) was a British alpine skier. He competed in the men's slalom at the 1956 Winter Olympics.
