= Gennady Chertishchev =

Soviet alpine skier (born 1932)

Personal information
- Nationality: Soviet
- Born: 1932 (age 93–94) Sverdlovsk (now Yekaterinburg)

Sport
- Sport: Alpine skiing

Gennady Chertishchev (born 1932) is a Soviet alpine skier. He competed in two events at the 1956 Winter Olympics.
