= Rochus Wagner =

German alpine skier

Rochus Wagner (born 28 July 1932) is a German former alpine skier who competed in the 1956 Winter Olympics. He also won the 1953 national downhill championship. He was an instructor after his competitive career.

== See also ==
- Alpine skiing at the 1956 Winter Olympics – Men's slalom
- United Team of Germany at the 1956 Winter Olympics
