= Dino Pompanin =

Italian alpine skier (1930–2015)

Personal information
- Nationality: Italian
- Born: 18 March 1930; Cortina d'Ampezzo, Italy
- Died: 31 December 2015 (aged 85); Cavalese, Italy

Sport
- Sport: Alpine skiing

Dino Pompanin (18 March 1930 – 31 December 2015) was an Italian alpine skier. He competed in the men's giant slalom at the 1956 Winter Olympics.
