= Roland Blaesi =

Swiss alpine skier (1932–2017)

Personal information
- Nationality: Swiss
- Born: 29 January 1932 Lenzerheide, Switzerland
- Died: 10 April 2017 (aged 85)

Sport
- Sport: Alpine skiing

Roland Blaesi (29 January 1932 – 10 April 2017) was a Swiss alpine skier. He competed in the men's giant slalom at the 1956 Winter Olympics.
