= James Walker (alpine skier) =

Australian alpine skier (1926–1996)

Personal information
- Nationality: Australian
- Born: 25 April 1926 Sydney, Australia
- Died: 2 June 1996 (aged 70) Haiti

Sport
- Sport: Alpine skiing

James Walker (25 April 1926 – 2 June 1996) was an Australian alpine skier. He competed in the men's giant slalom at the 1956 Winter Olympics.
