= Jan Zarycki =

Polish alpine skier (1933–1966)

Personal information
- Nationality: Polish
- Born: 8 February 1933; Zakopane, Poland
- Died: 27 September 1966 (aged 33); Zakopane, Poland

Sport
- Sport: Alpine skiing

Jan Zarycki (8 February 1933 – 27 September 1966) was a Polish alpine skier. He competed in three events at the 1956 Winter Olympics.
