= Walter Schuster =

Austrian alpine skier (1929–2018)

Medal record

Men's alpine skiing

Representing Austria

Olympic Games
Bronze medal – third place	1956 Cortina	Giant slalom

Walter Schuster (2 June 1929 – 13 January 2018) was an Austrian alpine skier who competed in the 1956 Winter Olympics.

He was born in Lermoos.

In 1956 he won the bronze medal in the giant slalom event. He also participated in the downhill competition but did not finish the race.
