= Stig Sollander =

Swedish alpine skier (1926–2019)

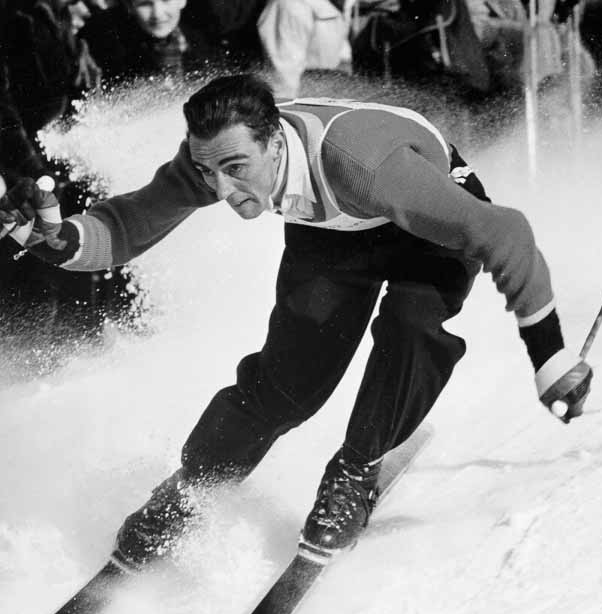
- Sollander at the 1952 Olympics

Personal information
- Full name: Stig Oskar Sollander
- Born: 25 June 1926 Östersund, Sweden
- Died: 12 December 2019 (aged 93)

Sport
- Sport: Alpine skiing
- Club: IFK Östersund; Östersund-Frösö SLK; Östersund-Frösö SLK
Medal record
Men's alpine skiing
Representing Sweden
Olympic Games
Bronze medal – third place	1956 Cortina	Slalom
World Championships
Bronze medal – third place	1954 Åre	Combined
Bronze medal – third place	1956 Cortina	Combined

Stig Oskar Sollander (25 June 1926 – 12 December 2019) was a Swedish alpine skier who competed in the 1948, 1952 and 1956 Winter Olympics. He had his best results in the slalom, finishing fifth in 1952 and winning Sweden's first Olympic medal in alpine skiing, a bronze in 1956. He won another bronze in the combined event at the FIS Alpine World Ski Championships.

In 1949, Sollander married Monika Charlotta Sollander; they had six children. Three of them, Stefan, Lena and Lotta, competed nationally in alpine skiing, and Lotta also took part in the 1972 Winter Olympics. Stig died in December 2019 at the age of 93.
