= Jaroslav Bogdálek =

Czech alpine skier (1929–2022)

Personal information
- Nationality: Czech
- Born: 24 May 1929; Brno, Czechoslovakia
- Died: 7 December 2022 (aged 93)

Sport
- Sport: Alpine skiing

Jaroslav Bogdálek (24 May 1929 – 7 December 2022) was a Czech alpine skier. He competed in three events at the 1956 Winter Olympics.
