= André Bertrand (alpine skier) =

Canadian alpine skier (1931–2019)

Personal information
- Born: 1 June 1931
- Died: 3 June 2019 (aged 88)

Skiing career
- Sport: Alpine skiing ♂
- Club: Laval University Ski Club
- Disciplines: Downhill, giant slalom, slalom

Olympics
- Teams: 2

André Bertrand (1 June 1931 – 3 June 2019) was a Canadian alpine skier who competed in the 1952 Winter Olympics and in the 1956 Winter Olympics.

Bertrand attended Laval University where he was a member of the university ski team. He also coached the university men's alpine ski team from 1950 to 1970. He won the 1950 Canadian men's downhill championship beating out Egon Schöpf for first place. He won the downhill championship again in 1954 as well as winning the Canadian alpine combined championship that year.

Bertrand was a member of the Canadian team at the 1952 Winter Olympics in Oslo, Norway, competing in the downhill, giant slalom, and slalom events. In the men's downhill, Betrand's time was 2:56.0 putting him in 41st place. He finished in 36th place with a time of 2:49.3 in the giant slalom. His combined time of 2:13.2 from his two runs in the slalom was good for 25th place.

Bertrand represented Canada again at the 1956 Winter Olympics in Cortina d'Ampezzo, Italy, competing in the downhill, giant slalom, and slalom events as well as being Canada's flag bearer at the closing ceremonies. In the men's downhill, Betrand's time was 3:31.2 putting him in 25th place. He finished in 39th place with a time of 3:31.1 in the giant slalom. His combined time of 302.8 from his two runs in the slalom was put him in 50th place.

Bertrand was inducted into the Canadian Ski Hall of Fame in 1989.
