= André Bertrand (lawyer) =

French lawyer

André Bertrand is a French attorney expert in the area of intellectual property.

He holds a PhD from the University of Paris and an LLM from UC Berkeley (Boalt Hall), from which he graduated in 1978.

Bertrand is the author of many treatises in the area of intellectual property:

- Privacy rights and image (ISBN 2711130843)
- Trademark law: distinctive signs, domain names (ISBN 2247060668)
- Music and Law: from Bach to Internet (ISBN 2711134261)
- Internet and Law (ISBN 2130511287)
- Copyrights and related rights (ISBN 224702422X )
- Fashion and Law (ISBN 2867490332)
- French law applied to unfair competition (ISBN 2867490308)
- Trademarks, patents, draws and models (ISBN 2225847673)
- Software protection (ISBN 2130461581)
- The practice of law applied to credit cards, electronic methods of payments and banking telematics (ISBN 2863251406)

André Bertrand is an expert of the trademark disputes over the "Yellow Pages".

== See also ==
- Boalt Hall
