= Evžen Čermák =

Czech alpine skier (1932–2018)

Personal information
- Nationality: Czech
- Born: 25 October 1932; Jablonec nad Nisou, Czechoslovakia
- Died: 19 April 2018 (aged 85)

Sport
- Sport: Alpine skiing

Evžen Čermák (25 October 1932 – 19 April 2018) was a Czech alpine skier. He competed in three events at the 1956 Winter Olympics.
