= Ludvig Dornig =

Slovenian alpine skier (1930–1996)

Personal information
- Nationality: Slovenian
- Born: 8 December 1930; Tržič, Kingdom of Yugoslavia
- Died: 1996 (aged 65–66)

Sport
- Sport: Alpine skiing

Ludvig Dornig (Slovene: Ludvik Dornik; 8 December 1930 – 1996) was a Slovenian alpine skier. He competed in three events at the 1956 Winter Olympics, representing Yugoslavia. He died in 1996 and his grandson is Slovenian tennis player Blaž Kavčič.
