= Susumu Sugiyama =

Japanese alpine skier (1932–2025)

Personal information
- Nationality: Japanese
- Born: 10 April 1932 Nozawaonsen, Japan
- Died: 10 April 2025 (aged 93)

Sport
- Sport: Alpine skiing

Susumu Sugiyama (Japanese: 杉山進; 10 April 1932 – 10 April 2025) was a Japanese alpine skier. He competed in three events at the 1956 Winter Olympics. Sugiyama died on 10 April 2025, his 93rd birthday.
