= Benik Amirian =

Iranian alpine skier

Personal information
- Nationality: Iranian
- Born: 1929

Sport
- Sport: Alpine skiing

Benik Amirian (born 1929) was an Iranian alpine skier. He competed in three events at the 1956 Winter Olympics.
