= Raymond Fellay =

Swiss alpine skier (1932–1994)

Personal information
- Born: 16 January 1932 Verbier, Switzerland
- Died: May 1994 (aged 62)
Medal record
Men's Alpine skiing
Representing Switzerland
Olympic Games
Silver medal – second place	1956 Cortina	Downhill

Raymond Fellay (16 January 1932 – 29 May 1994) was a Swiss alpine skier who competed in the 1956 Winter Olympics. He was born in Verbier.

In 1956 he won the silver medal in the Alpine downhill event. In the slalom competition he finished eleventh and in the giant slalom contest he finished 27th.
