= Christos Papageorgiou (skier) =

Greek alpine skier (1926–1997)

Personal information
- Nationality: Greek
- Born: 10 March 1926 Larissa, Greece
- Died: 1997 (aged 70–71)

Sport
- Sport: Alpine skiing

Christos Papageorgiou (10 March 1926 – 1997) was a Greek alpine skier. He competed in two events at the 1956 Winter Olympics.

== Biography ==
Christos Papageorgiou (1926–1997) was a Greek Army officer, Olympian, national champion skier, and a leading figure in the development of snow and water skiing in Greece and the Balkans. Born in Larisa, Greece, in 1926, he graduated from high school in 1944 and enlisted in the Greek Army in 1946. He graduated from the Hellenic Military Academy in 1949 as a Second Lieutenant in the Special Forces. During his military career, he served in operations during the Greek Civil War and later trained at Fort Benning, USA, in 1953.

Throughout the 1950s and 1960s, he held several leadership roles in military athletics and sports education, including instruction in winter warfare to H.R.H. Prince Constantine and leading physical training units. He was decorated with the Gold Medal of Valour and the Military Cross (C rank), among other honors. He retired from active duty in 1960 as a Captain and continued his involvement as a NATO reserve officer with training in cryptography and intelligence.

Papageorgiou competed in the 1956 Winter Olympics in Cortina d'Ampezzo, representing Greece in alpine skiing events. He was a multi-time national skiing champion and participated in numerous European and World Championship skiing competitions from the 1950s through the early 1970s. He also held administrative roles, including Secretary of the Greek Skiing Federation, and served on international skiing teaching committees.

Beyond snow skiing, he was instrumental in the promotion of water skiing in Greece and the Balkans. He served as President of the Greek Water Ski Federation and organized multiple international and Balkan competitions between 1964 and 1980. He also represented Greece at several World Water Ski Union congresses.

In addition to skiing, Papageorgiou had an active sports career in football, athletics, and tennis, playing for military and civilian clubs including Panathinaikos F.C. and Olympiakos F.C. He was recognized multiple times for his contributions to sportsmanship and athletic development.

He authored several works, including *Skiing Technic for Beginners* (1956) and won a NATO prize for his 1958 paper *Physical Education in the Atomic Age*.

Papageorgiou died in 1997, leaving a legacy in both the military and sports communities in Greece.
