= Vyacheslav Melnikov (alpine skier) =

Soviet alpine skier (born 1931)

Personal information
- Nationality: Soviet
- Born: 1931 Kirov, Russian SFSR, Soviet Union

Sport
- Sport: Alpine skiing

Vyacheslav Melnikov (born 1931) is a Soviet alpine skier. He competed in the men's slalom at the 1956 Winter Olympics.
