= Vladimír Krajňák =

Slovak alpine skier (1927–2014)

Personal information
- Nationality: Slovak
- Born: 24 September 1927; Kežmarok, Czechoslovakia
- Died: 15 January 2014 (aged 86); Poprad, Slovakia

Sport
- Sport: Alpine skiing

Vladimír Krajňák (24 September 1927 – 15 January 2014) was a Slovak alpine skier. He competed in three events at the 1956 Winter Olympics.
