= Toni Sailer =

Austrian alpine ski racer

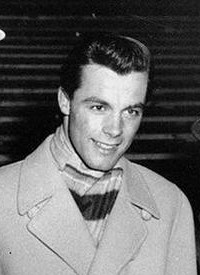
- Sailer in 1956

Personal information
- Born: 17 November 1935 Kitzbühel, Tyrol, Austria
- Died: 24 August 2009 (aged 73) Innsbruck, Tyrol, Austria
- Height: 1.83 m (6 ft 0 in)

Skiing career
- Sport: Alpine skiing
- Club: Kitzbühel Ski Club
- Retired: 1959 (age 23)
- Disciplines: Downhill, giant slalom, slalom, combined

Olympics
- Teams: 1 – (1956)
- Medals: 3 (3 gold)

World Championships
- Teams: 3 – (1954, 1956, 1958)
- Medals: 8 (7 gold)
Medal record
Men's alpine skiing
Representing Austria
Olympic Games
Gold medal – first place	1956 Cortina	Downhill
Gold medal – first place	1956 Cortina	Giant slalom
Gold medal – first place	1956 Cortina	Slalom
World Championships
Gold medal – first place	1956 Cortina	Downhill
Gold medal – first place	1956 Cortina	Giant slalom
Gold medal – first place	1956 Cortina	Slalom
Gold medal – first place	1956 Cortina	Combined
Gold medal – first place	1958 Bad Gastein	Downhill
Gold medal – first place	1958 Bad Gastein	Giant slalom
Gold medal – first place	1958 Bad Gastein	Combined
Silver medal – second place	1958 Bad Gastein	Slalom

Anton Engelbert "Toni" Sailer (17 November 1935 – 24 August 2009) was an Austrian alpine ski racer, considered among the best in the sport. At age 20, he won all three gold medals in alpine skiing at the 1956 Winter Olympics. He nearly duplicated the feat at the 1958 World Championships with two golds and a silver. He also won world titles both years in the combined, then a "paper" race, but awarded with medals by the International Ski Federation (FIS).

== Career ==
Born and raised in Kitzbühel in Tyrol, Sailer was nicknamed "Blitz from Kitz" (Blitz = German word for "bolt of lightning" or "flash"). A phenomenon as a teenager, he won the downhill and combined at the Grand Prix at Megève in 1952 at age 16. A broken leg caused him to miss the 1953 season and kept him from performing well at the World Championships in 1954. He returned to championship form in 1955 at age 19 and the following year became the first to win all three alpine skiing events at the Olympics, taking gold in the downhill, slalom, and giant slalom by 3.5, 4.2 and 6.2 seconds, respectively. He was the fifth athlete to win three gold medals in the same Olympic games, and became the most successful athlete at the 1956 Winter Olympics. The Super-G event did not exist until the 1980s. It was added to the Olympics in 1988. Through 2014, Sailer remains the youngest male gold medalist in Olympic alpine skiing.

From 1948 through 1980, Olympic alpine ski events doubled as the FIS World Championships, therefore the Olympic champion in any event was also the world champion. The combined event was dropped after 1948 to make way for the giant slalom in 1950. No Olympic medals were awarded for the combined event from 1952 through 1984, but it was an FIS world championship from 1954 through 1980. During this era, it was conducted as a "paper" race, using the results of the three events. A stand-alone combined event returned to the world championships in 1982 and to the Olympics in 1988, with one run of downhill and two runs of slalom.

Two years after the 1956 Olympics, Sailer won three gold medals and one silver at the 1958 World Championships in Bad Gastein, Austria. He won five of six possible Olympic/World Championship races, missing a perfect record with a silver in the Bad Gastein slalom, seven-tenths of a second back. Sailer also repeated as champion in the combined for a seventh world title in two years. Due to controversy over his amateur status after receiving compensation for acting (and skiing) in movies, he retired from ski racing competition in 1959.

== After racing ==
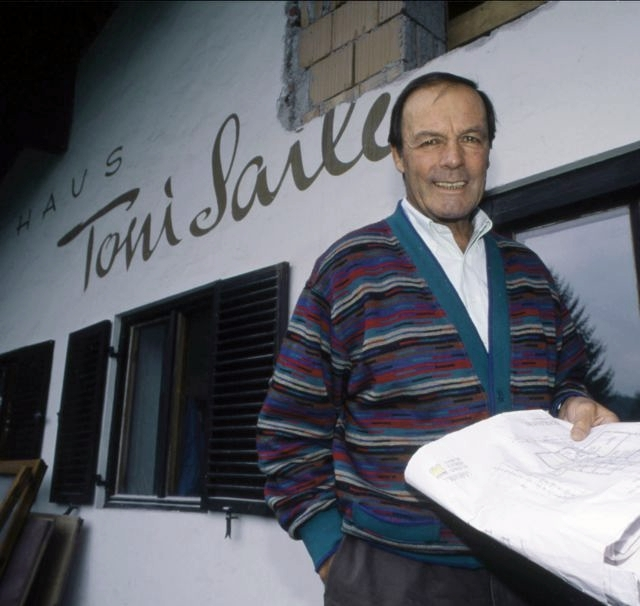
Toni Sailer in front of his house in Kitzbühel, 1998

Sailer's business interests included ski clothing and equipment, including the first successful fiberglass skis, made in Montreal, Quebec, Canada. In 1957–71, he appeared in a handful of movies, most of them shallow comedies at least partly set in alpine regions, with Sailer showing off his talent. In 1972–76, he was chief trainer and technical director of the Austrian Skiing Association (ÖSV). During the 1960s and 1970s, he ran a summer ski camp at Whistler in western Canada. Occasionally, as late as 2003 he was noted for appearing in a number of TV episodes or made for TV movies. He also sang professionally for a time, making 18 record albums.

Sailer, although not associated with any political party, announced in January 2004 that he would run for Mayor of Kitzbühel. A few weeks later he withdrew his candidature, saying he had only now realized that being mayor was a full-time job. In 2006 he announced his retirement as chief of race of the Hahnenkamm Race, a position which he had occupied for 20 years.

== Honors ==
Sailer was named Austrian Sportspersonality of the year in 1956, 1957, and 1958, and "Austrian Sportspersonality of the Century" in 1999. On 16 September 1958, he was featured on the cover of Bravo magazine.

For his contribution to the Olympic Movement, the International Olympic Committee awarded him the Bronze Olympic Order in 1982.

== Personal life ==
Sailer married Gaby Rummeny in 1976 in Vancouver; she died of cancer in 2000. His second marriage, to Hedwig Fischer, lasted from 2006 until his death. His son Florian (by Rummeny) also survives him.

== Death ==
It was announced in January 2008 that Sailer had laryngeal cancer, for which he had been undergoing chemotherapy in the preceding months. He died of cancer in Innsbruck, aged 73, in 2009, and was buried in Kitzbühel. His funeral ceremonies took place near the Hahnenkamm finish line.

== Selected filmography ==
- A Piece of Heaven (1957)
- A Thousand Stars Aglitter (1959)
- Twelve Girls and One Man (1959)
- Kauf dir einen bunten Luftballon (1961)
- Sein bester Freund (1962)
- Sansone e il tesoro degli Incas (1964)
- The Sky Is Blue (1964, TV film)
- Ski Fever (1966)
- The Great Happiness (1967)
- Aunt Trude from Buxtehude (1971)
- Holidays in Tyrol (1971)
- Wenn das die Nachbarn wüßten (1991)
- Almenrausch und Pulverschnee (1993, TV series)
