= Gheorghe Cristoloveanu =

Romanian alpine skier (1931–1998)

Personal information
- Nationality: Romanian
- Born: 16 April 1931; Brașov, Romania
- Died: 1998

Sport
- Sport: Alpine skiing

Gheorghe Cristoloveanu (16 April 1931 – 1998) was a Romanian alpine skier. He competed in three events at the 1956 Winter Olympics.
