= Jože Ilija =

Slovenian slalom canoeist (1928–1983)

Personal information
- Born: 12 March 1928 Jesenice, Slovenia
- Died: 19 May 1983 (aged 55) Ljubljana, Slovenia

Sport
- Sport: Kayaking
- Event: Folding kayak
Medal record
Men's slalom canoeing
Representing Yugoslavia
World Championships
Bronze medal – third place	1955 Tacen	Folding K-1

Jože Ilija (12 March 1928 – 19 May 1983) was a Slovenian slalom canoeist who competed for Yugoslavia in the 1950s. He won a bronze medal in the folding K-1 event at the 1955 ICF Canoe Slalom World Championships in Tacen.

He was also an alpine skier. He competed in three events at the 1956 Winter Olympics, representing Yugoslavia.
