= Greece at the 1956 Winter Olympics =

- IOC code: GRE
- NOC: Committee of the Olympic Games

in Cortina d'Ampezzo Italy
- Competitors: 3 (men) in 1 sport
- Flag bearer: Alexandros Vouxinos
- Medals: Gold 0 Silver 0 Bronze 0 Total 0

Winter Olympics appearances (overview)
- 1936; 1948; 1952; 1956; 1960; 1964; 1968; 1972; 1976; 1980; 1984; 1988; 1992; 1994; 1998; 2002; 2006; 2010; 2014; 2018; 2022; 2026

Greece competed at the 1956 Winter Olympics in Cortina d'Ampezzo, Italy.

== Alpine skiing ==
Men

Athlete	Event	Race 1		Race 2		Total	
Athlete	Event	Time	Rank	Time	Rank	Time	Rank
Christos Papageorgiou	Downhill					8:03.2	47
Aris Vatimbella	Downhill					5:44.2	46
Alexandros Vouxinos	Giant Slalom					DSQ	–
Christos Papageorgiou	Giant Slalom					7:24.5	87
Aris Vatimbella	Giant Slalom					5:23.6	85
Aris Vatimbella	Slalom	DSQ	–	–	–	DSQ	–
