= Mahmut Eroğlu =

Turkish alpine skier (1930–2018)

Personal information
- Nationality: Turkish
- Born: 16 March 1930; Sarıkamış, Turkey
- Died: December 2018 (aged 88)

Sport
- Sport: Alpine skiing

Mahmut Eroğlu (16 March 1930 – December 2018) was a Turkish alpine skier. He competed in two events at the 1956 Winter Olympics.
