= Mahmoud Beiglou =

Iranian alpine skier (1929–2013)

Personal information
- Nationality: Iranian
- Born: 1929
- Died: 18 January 2013 (aged 83–84)

Sport
- Sport: Alpine skiing

Mahmoud Beiglou (1929 – 18 January 2013) was an Iranian alpine skier. He competed in three events at the 1956 Winter Olympics. Beiglou died on 18 January 2013.
