= Guido Ghedina =

Italian alpine skier (1931–1976)

Personal information
- Nationality: Italian
- Born: 17 January 1931; Cortina d'Ampezzo, Italy
- Died: 20 June 1976 (aged 45)

Sport
- Sport: Alpine skiing

Guido Ghedina (17 January 1931 – 20 June 1976) was an Italian alpine skier. He competed in two events at the 1956 Winter Olympics.
