= Yury Sharkov =

Soviet alpine skier (born 1930)

Personal information
- Nationality: Soviet
- Born: 29 November 1930; Lyuban, Russian SFSR, Soviet Union

Sport
- Sport: Alpine skiing

Yury Sharkov (born 29 November 1930) is a Soviet alpine skier. He competed in two events at the 1956 Winter Olympics.
