= Hans Olofsson =

Swedish alpine skier (1928–1974)

Personal information
- Nationality: Swedish
- Born: 18 July 1928; Storuman, Sweden
- Died: 13 September 1974 (aged 46); Storuman, Sweden

Sport
- Sport: Alpine skiing

Hans Olofsson (18 July 1928 – 13 September 1974) was a Swedish alpine skier. He competed in two events at the 1956 Winter Olympics.
