= Aleksandr Filatov =

Soviet alpine skier (1928–1999)

Personal information
- Born: 8 March 1928; Moscow, Soviet Union
- Died: 31 March 1999 (aged 71)

Sport
- Sport: Alpine skiing

Aleksandr Filatov (8 March 1928 – 31 March 1999) was a Soviet alpine skier. He competed in three events at the 1956 Winter Olympics.
