= Franc Cvenkelj =

Slovenian alpine skier (1925–1997)

Personal information
- Nationality: Slovenian
- Born: 1 May 1925 Tržič, Yugoslavia
- Died: 27 May 1997 (aged 72) Jesenice, Slovenia

Sport
- Sport: Alpine skiing

Franc Cvenkelj (1 May 1925 – 27 May 1997) was a Slovenian alpine skier. He competed in three events at the 1956 Winter Olympics, representing Yugoslavia.
