= Reza Bazargan =

Iranian alpine skier

Personal information
- Nationality: Iranian
- Born: 1931
- Died: between 2006 and 2010

Sport
- Sport: Alpine skiing

Reza Bazargan (born 1931, died between 2006 and 2010) was an Iranian alpine skier. He competed in three events at the 1956 Winter Olympics.
