= Jaime Talens =

Spanish alpine skier (1933–2010)

Personal information
- Nationality: Spanish
- Born: 29 January 1933; Barcelona, Spain
- Died: 17 May 2010 (aged 77); Barcelona, Spain

Sport
- Sport: Alpine skiing

Jaime Talens (29 January 1933 – 17 May 2010) was a Spanish alpine skier. He competed in three events at the 1956 Winter Olympics. Talens died in Barcelona on 17 May 2010, at the age of 77.
