= Jan Thorstensen =

Norwegian alpine skier (1933–2014)

Jan Thorstensen (28 May 1933 – 20 August 2014) was a Norwegian alpine skier, born in Oslo. He competed in slalom and giant slalom at the Winter Olympics in Cortina d'Ampezzo in 1956.
