= Viktor Talyanov =

Soviet alpine skier (1934–2014)

Personal information
- Nationality: Soviet
- Born: 19 October 1934; Leningrad, Russian SFSR, Soviet Union
- Died: 2 January 2014 (aged 79); Moscow, Russia

Sport
- Sport: Alpine skiing

Viktor Talyanov (19 October 1934 – 2 January 2014) was a Soviet alpine skier. He competed at the 1956 Winter Olympics and the 1964 Winter Olympics.
