= Tony Aslangul =

Australian alpine skier (1923–2000)

Personal information
- Nationality: Australian
- Born: 21 June 1923; Paris, France
- Died: 3 January 2000 (aged 76)

Sport
- Sport: Alpine skiing

Tony Aslangul (21 June 1923 – 3 January 2000) was an Australian alpine skier. He competed in two events at the 1956 Winter Olympics.
