= Petar Ivanov Angelov =

Bulgarian alpine skier (born 1932)

Personal information
- Nationality: Bulgarian
- Born: 29 March 1932 (age 94) Samokov, Bulgaria

Sport
- Sport: Alpine skiing

Petar Ivanov Angelov (Bulgarian: Петър Иванов Ангелов, born 29 March 1932) is a Bulgarian alpine skier. He competed in three events at the 1956 Winter Olympics.
