= Aris Vatimbella =

Greek alpine skier (1916–1990)

Aristarque Georges "Aris" Vatimbella
Personal information
- Nationality: Greek
- Born: 3 February 1916 Alexandria, Sultanate of Egypt
- Died: 20 January 1990 (aged 73) Paris, France

Sport
- Sport: Alpine skiing

Aris Vatimbella (3 February 1916 – 20 January 1990) was a Greek alpine skier. He competed in three events at the 1956 Winter Olympics.
