= Spain at the 1956 Winter Olympics =

- IOC code: ESP (SPA used at these Games)
- NOC: Spanish Olympic Committee
- Website: www.coe.es (in Spanish)

in Cortina d'Ampezzo
- Competitors: 9 (men) in 3 sports
- Flag bearer: Luis Arias
- Medals: Gold 0 Silver 0 Bronze 0 Total 0

Winter Olympics appearances (overview)
- 1936; 1948; 1952; 1956; 1960; 1964; 1968; 1972; 1976; 1980; 1984; 1988; 1992; 1994; 1998; 2002; 2006; 2010; 2014; 2018; 2022; 2026

Spain competed at the 1956 Winter Olympics in Cortina d'Ampezzo, Italy.

== Alpine skiing ==
Men

Athlete	Event	Race 1		Race 2		Total	
Athlete	Event	Time	Rank	Time	Rank	Time	Rank
Jaime Talens	Downhill					DSQ	–
Luis Molné	Downhill					4:08.9	37
Francisco Viladomat	Downhill					4:02.1	36
Luis Molné	Giant Slalom					DSQ	–
Jaime Talens	Giant Slalom					4:52.2	83
Francisco Viladomat	Giant Slalom					4:08.7	68
Luis Arias	Giant Slalom					3:47.1	53
Francisco Viladomat	Slalom	DSQ	–	–	–	DSQ	–
Luis Molné	Slalom	2:45.5	58	3:07.5	56	5:53.0	56
Jaime Talens	Slalom	2:25.7	55	2:38.5	48	5:04.2	52
Luis Arias	Slalom	1:51.7	39	2:21.1	32	4:12.8	31

== Bobsleigh ==
Sled	Athletes	Event	Run 1		Run 2		Run 3		Run 4		Total	
Sled	Athletes	Event	Time	Rank	Time	Rank	Time	Rank	Time	Rank	Time	Rank
ESP-1	Alfonso de Portago; Vicente Sartorius y Cabeza de Vaca	Two-man	1:24.81	7	1:23.77	3	1:24.03	3	1:24.99	5	5:37.60	4

Sled	Athletes	Event	Run 1		Run 2		Run 3		Run 4		Total	
Sled	Athletes	Event	Time	Rank	Time	Rank	Time	Rank	Time	Rank	Time	Rank
ESP-1	Alfonso de Portago; Vicente Sartorius y Cabeza de Vaca; Gonzalo Taboada; Luis Muñoz	Four-man	1:18.87	7	1:19.27	10	1:21.37	17	1:19.98	6	5:19.49	9

== Figure skating ==
Men

Athlete	CF	FS	Points	Places	Rank
Darío Villalba	14	16	127.30	128	14

== Sources ==
- Official Olympic Reports
- Olympic Winter Games 1956, full results by sports-reference.com
