= Hans Magnus Andresen =

Norwegian alpine skier (1929–1976)

Personal information
- Born: 31 May 1929; Oslo, Norway
- Died: 4 August 1976 (aged 47)

Sport
- Sport: Alpine skiing
- Club: Njård IL

Hans Magnus Andresen (31 May 1929 – 4 August 1976) was a Norwegian alpine skier. He was born in Oslo, and represented the club Njård IL. He participated at the 1956 Winter Olympics in Cortina d'Ampezzo, where he competed in slalom and giant slalom.
