= Tofane =

Mountain in Italy

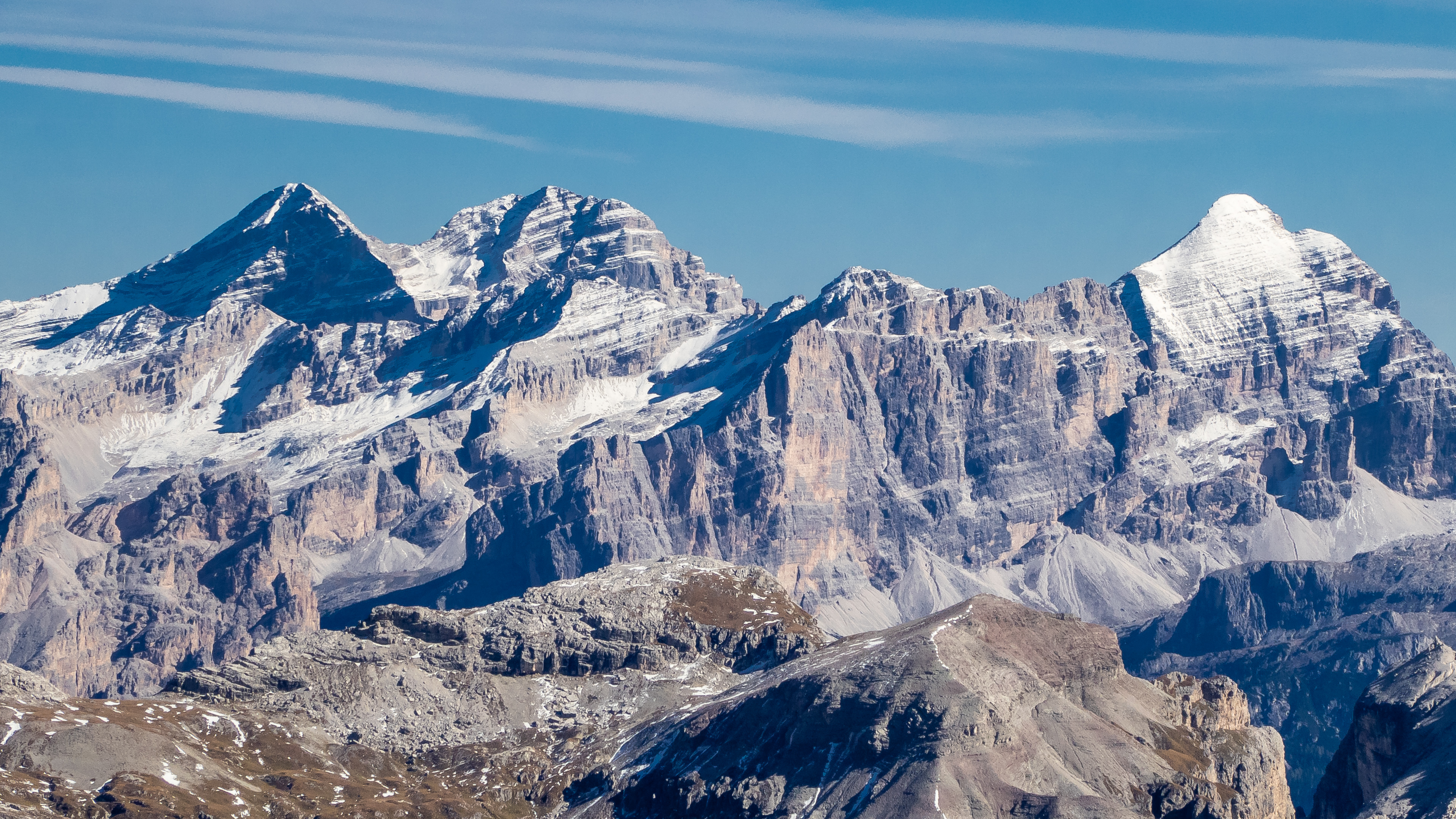
- Tofana di Dentro, Tofana di Mezzo, and Tofana di Rozes

Highest point
- Elevation: 3,244 m (10,643 ft) (Tofana di Mezzo)
- Listing: Alpine mountains above 3000 m
- Coordinates: 46°32′N 12°03′E

Geography
- Location within Alps
- Location: Province of Belluno, Italy
- Parent range: Dolomites

Climbing
- First ascent: 29 August 1863 (Tofana di Mezzo), 163 years ago by Paul Grohmann and Francesco Lacedelli

Tofane is a mountain group in the Dolomites of northern Italy, west of Cortina d'Ampezzo in the province of Belluno, Veneto. Most of the Tofane lie within the Ampezzo Dolomites Natural Park.

== Peaks ==
The highest peaks of the Tofane group are Tofana di Mezzo (3,244 m (10,643 ft)), Tofana di Dentro (3,238 m (10,623 ft)), and Tofana di Rozes (3,225 m (10,581 ft)). Tofana di Mezzo is the third highest peak in the Dolomites, after Marmolada (3,343 m (10,968 ft)) and Antelao (3,262 m (10,702 ft)). All three peaks were first climbed by Paul Grohmann along with local mountain guides, in 1863 (Tofana di Mezzo - with Francesco Lacedelli), 1864 (Tofana di Rozes - with Francesco Lacedelli, Angelo Dimai and Santo Siorpaes) and 1865 (Tofana di Dentro - with Angelo Dimai).

== Geology ==
The Dolomites were formed during the Cretaceous Period, approximately 60 million years ago, due to the collision of the African and European continents. The Tofane is largely formed from the Upper Triassic rock Dolomia principale. The strata are perceptibly folded, and the mountains are finally formed by wind, rain, glaciers and rivers.

== Tourism ==
=== Access ===
A cable lift system (Freccia nel Cielo, "Arrow in the sky") goes from Cortina almost to the top of Tofane di Mezzo. There is only a short walk from the top cable car to the summit. Alternatively the via ferratas VF Punta Anna and VF Gianna Aglio can be used to reach Tofane di Mezzo.

=== Cabins (rifugi) ===
Some of the cabins in the Tofane are the Rifugio Angelo Dibona (2,083 m (6,834 ft)), the Rifugio Giussani (2,580 m (8,465 ft)), the Rifugio Duca d'Aosta (2,098 m (6,883 ft)), and the Rifugio Pomedes (2,303 m (7,556 ft)).

=== Via ferratas ===
The via ferratas of Tofane are VF Punta Anna and VF Gianna Aglio on Tofana di Mezzo, VF Lamon and VF Formenton on Tofana di Dentro, and VF Giovanni Lipella on Tofana di Rozes, where there also are tunnel systems from World War I.

== History ==
During the First World War, the Tofane was a battlefield of the Italian Front for clashes between the Italian and Austro-Hungarian forces. The front lines went through the mountains.

At the 1956 Winter Olympics, Mount Tofane hosted five of the six alpine skiing events. It regularly hosts women's speed events on the World Cup circuit, and hosted the World Championships in 2021. The men's 1956 downhill and the current women's World Cup races are on the Olimpia delle Tofane ski race course (often referred to as “Tofana” for short); it is famous for the Tofana Schuss, where athletes can reach speeds over 130 kilometres per hour (81 mph).

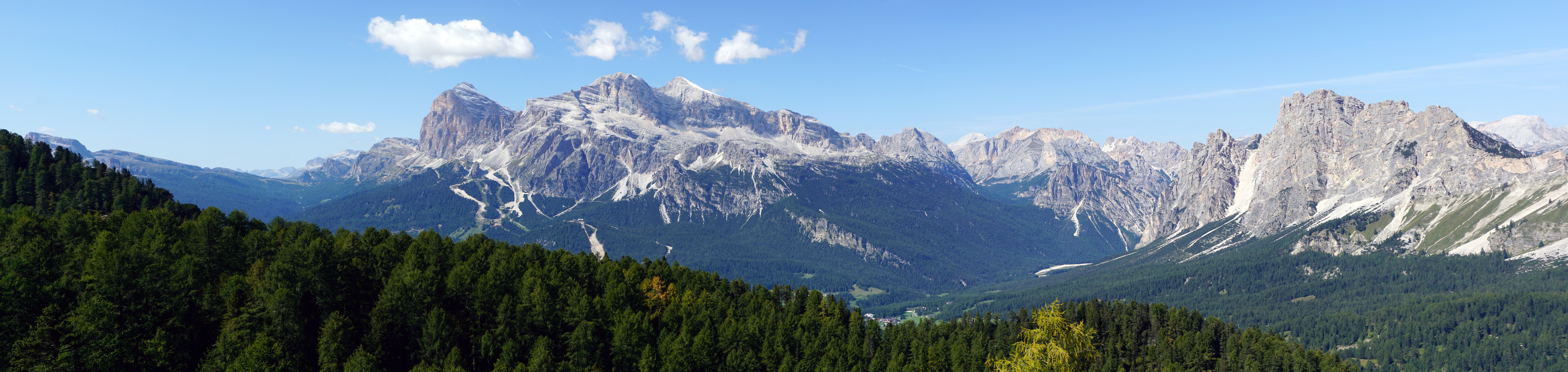
Panoramic view towards Tofane from Faloria. Olimpia delle Tofane ski race course and hill Col Drusciè

== See also ==
- Golden age of alpinism
- Silver age of alpinism
- Italian front (World War I)
- White War
