= Ewald Eberle =

Liechtenstein alpine skier (1933–2025)

Ewald Eberle (16 April 1933 – 16 August 2025) was a Liechtensteiner alpine skier who competed in the 1956 Winter Olympics.

Eberle died on 16 August 2025, at the age of 92.
