= Mount Faloria =

Mountain in Italy

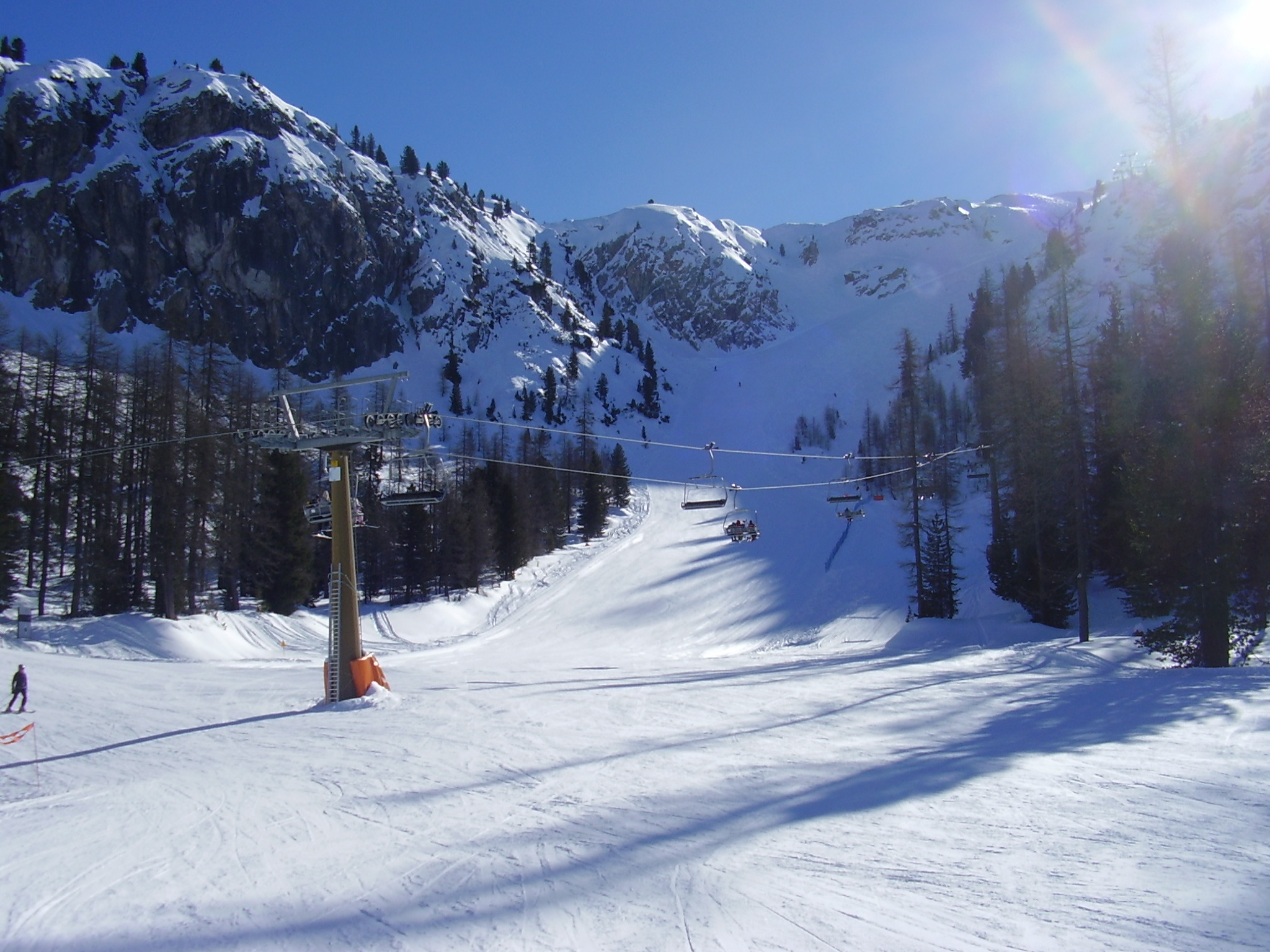
- Faloria ski area

Highest point
- Elevation: 2,352 m (7,717 ft)
- Coordinates: 46°32′53.2″N 12°11′41.7″E

Geography
- Location within Alps
- Location: Italy
- Parent range: Dolomites

Mount Faloria is a mountain in the Alps of northern Italy, located in the Dolomites near Cortina d'Ampezzo. It has an altitude of 2,352 metres (7,717 ft) and lies in close proximity to Sorapiss. It hosted the men's giant slalom event of the 1956 Winter Olympics, won by Toni Sailer of Austria, the first of three wins in his gold medal sweep. There is a mountain refuge at the summit, Rifugio Faloria.

== Features ==
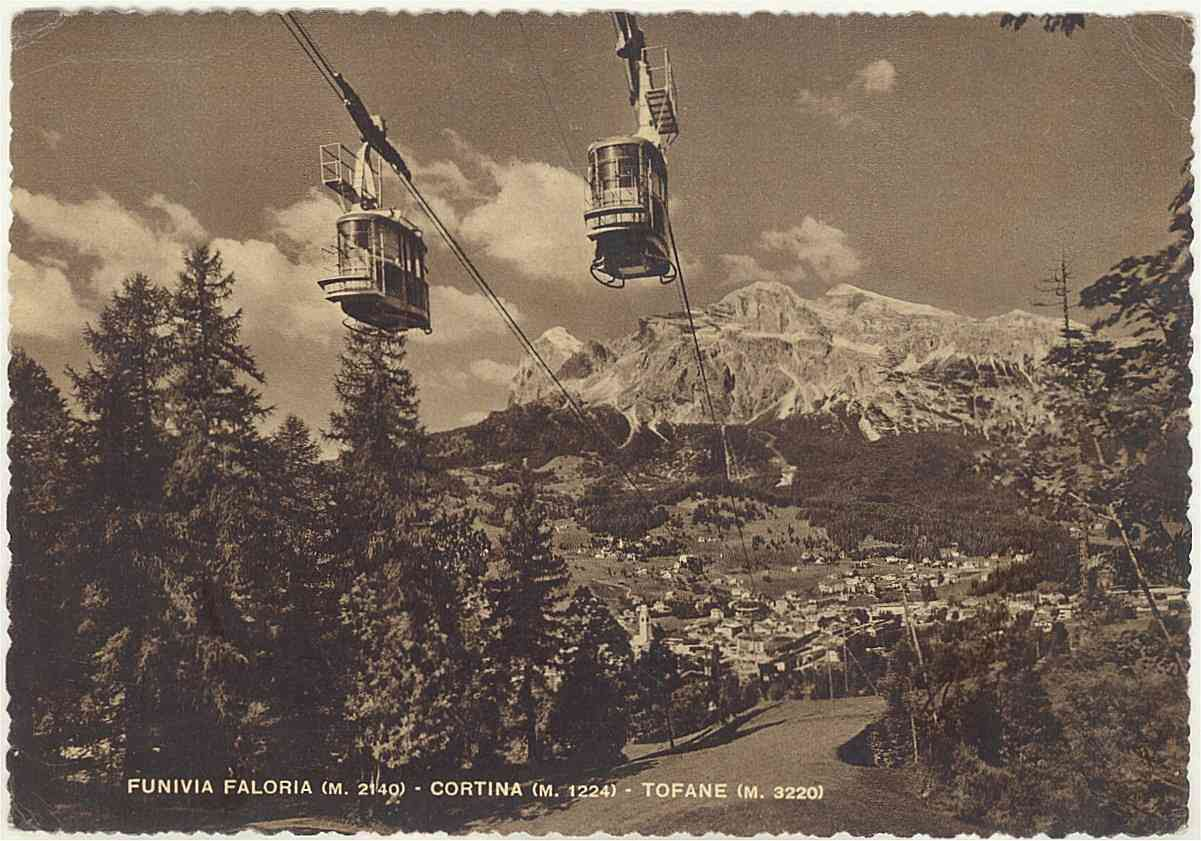
Funivia Faloria

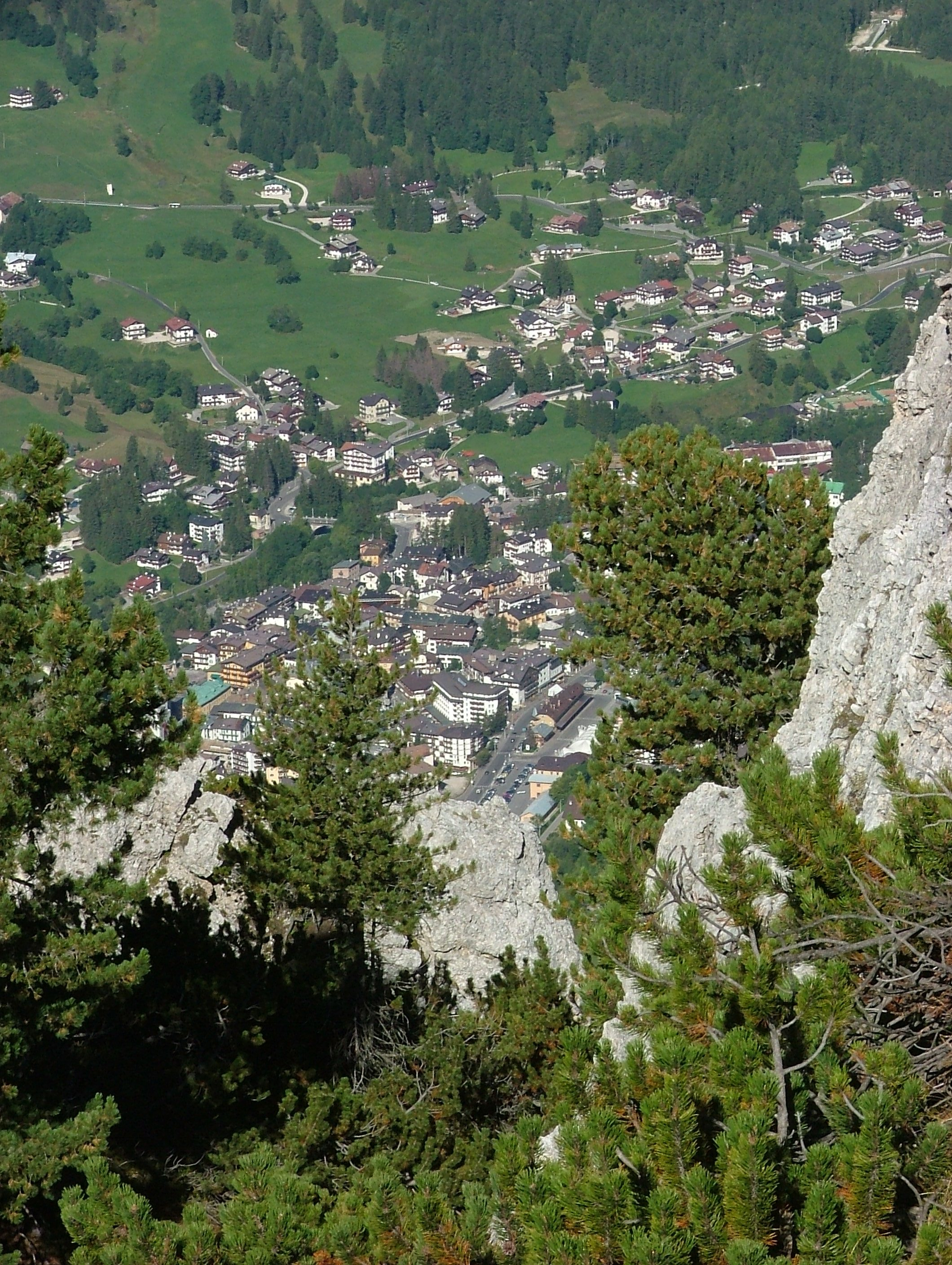
View of Cortina from Mount Faloria

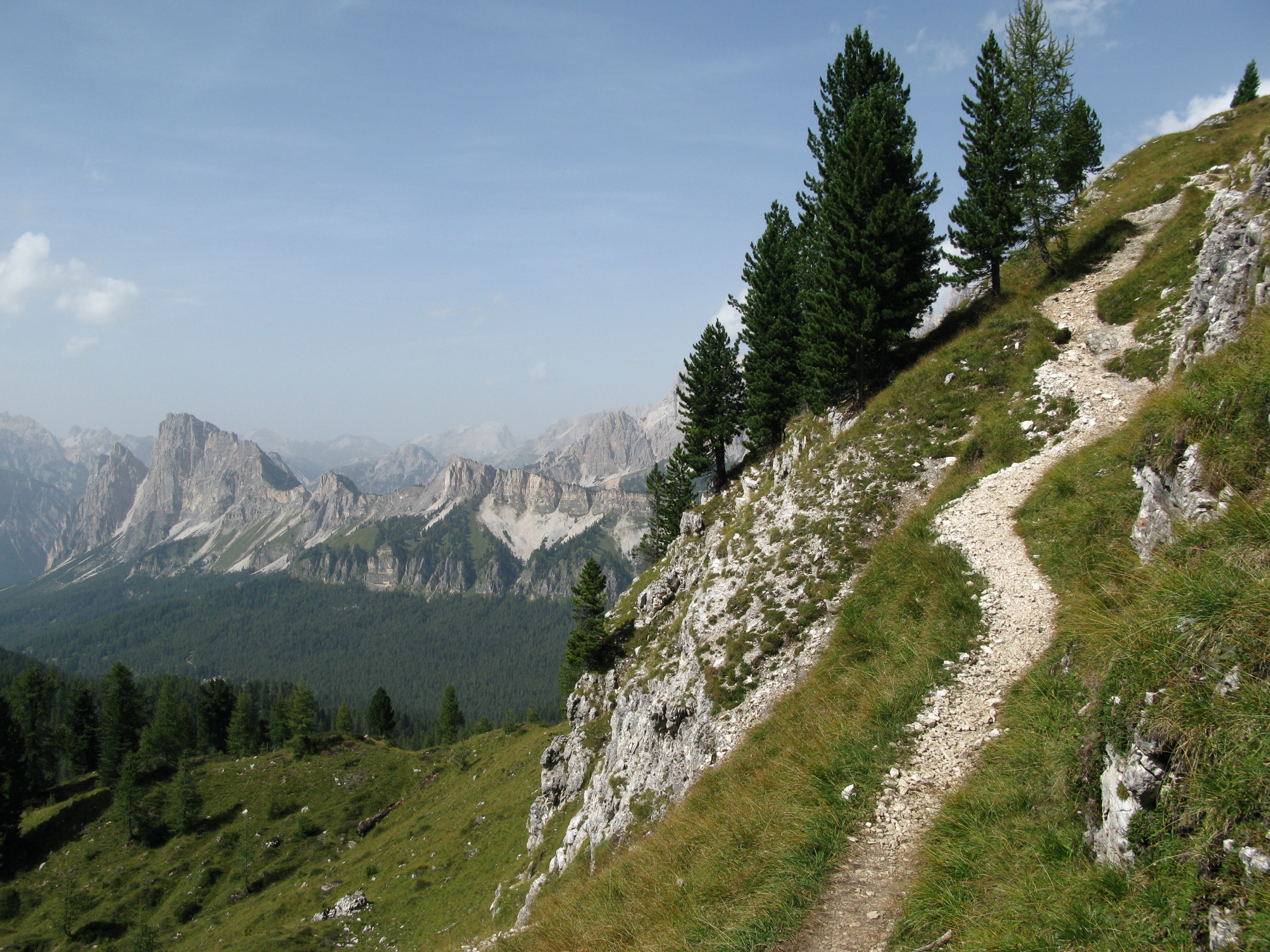
Faloria-Path N°213

A cable car, which runs from Cortina through thickly wooded territory and grass land, reaches a station at the mountain. The site is also approached by a four-seat chairlift from the Rio Gere on the Pian de ra Bigontina-Costa Faloria line. At this location there are ski slopes which run for a total length of 10 kilometres (6.2 mi), a snow park, a slow-ski piste, and two refuges and ski bars. From the terrace of the bar at Faloria station, there are views of the mountain and other peaks to the north.

A bar and restaurant existed on top of the mountain as early as 1939, and in 1941, plans for Rifugio Edda Ciano Mussolini were approved. It was built on the initiative of the Funivie Aeree Italiane Turistiche (FAIT) di Cortina d’Ampezzo. The building is situated close to the upper station of the cable car. After World War II, the structure was renamed Rifugio Faloria.

Trekkers can take easy trails along the slopes from the Mount to reach the valley. However, treks to Lake Sorapis need some effort. The lake, which is set in the midst of vertical rock cliffs, has white sand on its shores and the lake water is emerald in colour.

Michelangelo Antonioni directed a documentary film in 1950 titled La Funivia Del Faloria (The Funicular of Mount Faloria) on the cable car between Mount and the Cortina d'Ampezzo, which has a run time of 10 minutes.

== Bibliography ==
- Bramblett, Reid; Levine, Lynn A. (3 March 2005). Frommer's Italy from $90 a Day. John Wiley & Sons. p. 469. ISBN 978-0-7645-8816-7.
- Chatman, Seymour Benjamin (1985). Antonioni, Or, The Surface of the World. University of California Press. ISBN 978-0-520-05205-5.
- Cowie, Peter (1963). Antonioni, Bergman, Resnais. Tantivy Press.
