= Bulgaria at the 1956 Winter Olympics =

- IOC code: BUL
- NOC: Bulgarian Olympic Committee
- Website: www.bgolympic.org (in Bulgarian and English)

in Cortina d'Ampezzo
- Competitors: 7 in 2 sports
- Medals: Gold 0 Silver 0 Bronze 0 Total 0

Winter Olympics appearances (overview)
- 1936; 1948; 1952; 1956; 1960; 1964; 1968; 1972; 1976; 1980; 1984; 1988; 1992; 1994; 1998; 2002; 2006; 2010; 2014; 2018; 2022; 2026

Bulgaria competed at the 1956 Winter Olympics in Cortina d'Ampezzo, Italy.

== Alpine skiing ==
Men

Athlete	Event	Race 1		Race 2		Total	
Athlete	Event	Time	Rank	Time	Rank	Time	Rank
Petar Ivanov Angelov	Downhill					3:38.5	27
Georgi Varoshkin	Downhill					3:30.0	24
Georgi Dimitrov	Downhill					3:18.1	18
Petar Ivanov Angelov	Giant Slalom					3:40.0	44
Georgi Varoshkin	Giant Slalom					3:33.9	41
Georgi Dimitrov	Giant Slalom					3:28.9	34
Georgi Varoshkin	Slalom	n/a	?	DSQ	–	DSQ	–
Petar Ivanov Angelov	Slalom	1:49.1	33	2:27.1	39	4:16.2	32
Georgi Dimitrov	Slalom	1:35.2	22	2:00.7	14	3:35.9	13

== Cross-country skiing ==
Men

Event	Athlete	Race	
Event	Athlete	Time	Rank
15 km	Zakharin Grivev	58:11	54
15 km	Dimitri Petrov	57:53	53
30 km	Zakharin Grivev	2'03:21	44
30 km	Khristo Donchev	2'02:10	43
50 km	Khristo Donchev	3'26:06	26

Women

Event	Athlete	Race	
Event	Athlete	Time	Rank
10 km	Mariya Dimova	45:52	34
