= Bill Day (alpine skier) =

Australian alpine skier (1934–2024)

William George Day (21 January 1934 – 28 October 2024) was an Australian alpine skier who competed in the 1952, 1956 and 1960 Winter Olympics. After retiring from competitive skiing, Day lived and worked on a cattle station in Talbingo, New South Wales. He later moved to Wagga Wagga, New South Wales, where he died on 28 October 2024, at the age of 90.
