= Frank Prihoda =

Australian alpine skier (1921–2022)

Personal information
- Born: František Příhoda; 8 July 1921 Prague, Czechoslovakia
- Died: 10 November 2022 (aged 101) Melbourne, Australia

Sport
- Country: AUS
- Sport: Alpine Skiing
- Event: 1956 Winter Olympics

Frank Prihoda (born as František Příhoda; 8 July 1921 – 10 November 2022) was a Czechoslovak-born Australian alpine skier who competed in the 1956 Winter Olympics. Until his death in November 2022, he was Australia's oldest living former Olympian.

== Biography ==
Born in Prague, Czechoslovakia (now Czech Republic), in 1921, Prihoda learned to ski with his sister and Olympic skier, Alexandra Nekvapilová's help and had his 1st downhill race in 1937. In 1936, a year before his downhill race of 1937, Frank began ski racing with the Czechoslovak Ski Federation squad. Also in 1937 when aged 16, his parents died and he took over the family's artificial flower manufacturing business, managing it throughout World War II.

Along with Alexandra Nekvapilová and her husband Karel, he defected from Czechoslovakia in 1948, when it became a communist country, first travelling to Austria and then to Australia where he settled. There, they started one of the first ski-lodge businesses in Thredbo, New South Wales. In 1950, Frank and his family boarded a ship to emigrate to Australia, skis in tow, arriving in Melbourne, and began working in manufacturing artificial flowers before moving over to the furniture and textile trades. In 1956, he participated in the 1956 Winter Olympics in Cortina d'Ampezzo, Italy.

In 1958, Prihoda became chairman of the race committee of the Victorian Ski Association, before moving to Thredbo to join his family in 1974, where he owned a shop until 2001 at age 80. A year before the closing, in 2000, he carried the Olympic Torch in Thredbo, lighting the cauldron on the Village Green. Prihoda still skied until he became 90 years old.

In 2020, a ski run was named after Prihoda. Prihoda died on 10 November 2022, at the age of 101.
