= Alpine skiing at the 1956 Winter Olympics =

Alpine skiing at the VII Olympic Winter Games
- Venue: Tofana and Faloria (men's GS); Cortina d'Ampezzo, Italy
- Dates: 27 January – 3 February 1956
- No. of events: 6
- Competitors: 183 from 29 nations

At the 1956 Winter Olympics in Cortina d'Ampezzo, Italy, the six alpine skiing events were held from Friday, 27 January to Friday, 3 February.

Toni Sailer of Austria won all three men's events to become the first alpine ski racer to win three gold medals in a single Olympics. The feat has been repeated once, by Jean-Claude Killy in 1968.

The races were held at the adjacent Tofana, except for the men's giant slalom, which was held at Monte Faloria. The men's downhill was the final event.

== Medal summary ==
=== Men's events ===
| Event | Gold | | Silver | | Bronze | |
|---|---|---|---|---|---|---|
| Downhill | Toni Sailer; Austria | 2:52.2 | Raymond Fellay; Switzerland | 2:55.7 | Anderl Molterer; Austria | 2:56.2 |
| Giant Slalom | Toni Sailer; Austria | 3:00.1 | Anderl Molterer; Austria | 3:06.3 | Walter Schuster; Austria | 3:07.2 |
| Slalom | Toni Sailer; Austria | 3:14.7 | Chiharu Igaya; Japan | 3:18.7 | Stig Sollander; Sweden | 3:20.2 |

=== Women's events ===
| Event | Gold | | Silver | | Bronze | |
|---|---|---|---|---|---|---|
| Downhill | Madeleine Berthod; Switzerland | 1:40.7 | Frieda Dänzer; Switzerland | 1:45.4 | Lucille Wheeler; Canada | 1:45.9 |
| Giant Slalom | Ossi Reichert; United Team of Germany | 1:56.5 | Putzi Frandl; Austria | 1:57.8 | Thea Hochleitner; Austria | 1:58.2 |
| Slalom | Renée Colliard; Switzerland | 1:52.3 | Regina Schöpf; Austria | 1:55.4 | Yevgeniya Sidorova; Soviet Union | 1:56.7 |

== Participating nations ==
- Australia (7)
- Austria (11)
- Belgium (1)
- Bolivia (1)
- Bulgaria (3)
- Canada (5)
- Chile (3)
- Czechoslovakia (4)
- Finland (2)
- France (13)
- United Team of Germany (11)
- Great Britain (15)
- Greece (3)
- Iceland (5)
- Iran (3)
- Italy (13)
- Japan (2)
- Lebanon (3)
- Liechtenstein (6)
- Norway (10)
- Poland (8)
- Romania (4)
- Soviet Union (10)
- Spain (4)
- Sweden (8)
- Switzerland (14)
- Turkey (4)
- United States (12)
- Yugoslavia (4)

== Medal table ==
| Rank | Nation | Gold | Silver | Bronze | Total |
|---|---|---|---|---|---|
| 1 | Austria | 3 | 3 | 3 | 9 |
| 2 | Switzerland | 2 | 2 | 0 | 4 |
| 3 | United Team of Germany | 1 | 0 | 0 | 1 |
| 4 | Japan | 0 | 1 | 0 | 1 |
| 5 | Canada | 0 | 0 | 1 | 1 |
| 5 | Soviet Union | 0 | 0 | 1 | 1 |
| 5 | Sweden | 0 | 0 | 1 | 1 |
| Totals (7 entries) | | 6 | 6 | 6 | 18 |

== Course information ==
| Date | Race | Start Elevation | Finish Elevation | Vertical Drop | Course Length | Average Gradient |
|---|---|---|---|---|---|---|
| Fri 3-Feb | Downhill - men | 2,282 m (7,487 ft) | 1,380 m (4,528 ft) | 902 m (2,959 ft) | 3.461 km (2.151 mi) | 26.1% |
| Wed 1-Feb | Downhill - women | 2,114 m (6,936 ft) | 1,612 m (5,289 ft) | 502 m (1,647 ft) | 1.552 km (0.964 mi) | 32.3% |
| Sun 29-Jan | Giant Slalom - men | 2,336 m (7,664 ft) | 1,713 m (5,620 ft) | 623 m (2,044 ft) | 2.660 km (1.653 mi) | 23.4% |
| Fri 27-Jan | Giant Slalom - women | 2,020 m (6,627 ft) | 1,612 m (5,289 ft) | 408 m (1,339 ft) | 1.366 km (0.849 mi) | 29.9% |
| Tue 31-Jan | Slalom - men | 1,748 m (5,735 ft) | 1,497 m (4,911 ft) | 251 m (823 ft) | 0.617 km (0.383 mi) | 40.7% |
| Mon 30-Jan | Slalom - women | 1,673 m (5,489 ft) | 1,498 m (4,915 ft) | 175 m (574 ft) | 0.456 km (0.283 mi) | 38.4% |

== World championships ==
From 1948 through 1980, the alpine skiing events at the Winter Olympics also served as the World Championships, held every two years. With the addition of the giant slalom, the combined event was dropped for 1950 and 1952, but returned as a World Championship event in 1954 as a "paper race" which used the results from the three events. During the Olympics from 1956 through 1980, World Championship medals were awarded by the FIS for the combined event. The combined returned as a separate event at the World Championships in 1982 and at the Olympics in 1988.

=== Combined ===
Men's Combined

| Medal | Athlete | Points | DH | GS | SL |
|---|---|---|---|---|---|
| 1st place, gold medalist(s) | (Austria) Toni Sailer (AUT) | 0.00 | 1st place, gold medalist(s) | 1st place, gold medalist(s) | 1st place, gold medalist(s) |
| 2nd place, silver medalist(s) | (France) Charles Bozon (FRA) | 12.65 | 8 | 5 | 7 |
| 3rd place, bronze medalist(s) | (Sweden) Stig Sollander (SWE) | 16.92 | 10 | 16 | 3rd place, bronze medalist(s) |
| 4 | (Switzerland) Raymond Fellay (SUI) | 18.39 | 2nd place, silver medalist(s) | 27 | 11 |
| 5 | (Norway) Asle Sjåstad (NOR) | 27.25 | 14 | 22 | 18 |
| 6 | (Italy) Gino Burrini (ITA) | 30.43 | 6 | 10 | 27 |

- Downhill: 3 February, Giant Slalom: 29 January, Slalom: 31 January

Women's Combined

| Medal | Athlete | Points | DH | GS | SL |
|---|---|---|---|---|---|
| 1st place, gold medalist(s) | (Switzerland) Madeleine Berthod (SUI) | 9.85 | 1st place, gold medalist(s) | 4 | 17 |
| 2nd place, silver medalist(s) | (Switzerland) Frieda Dänzer (SUI) | 11.19 | 2nd place, silver medalist(s) | 11 | 10 |
| 3rd place, bronze medalist(s) | (Italy) Giuliana Chenal-Minuzzo (ITA) | 12.31 | 4 | 13 | 4 |
| 4 | (Austria) Dorothea Hochleitner (AUT) | 12.79 | 7 | 3rd place, bronze medalist(s) | 12 |
| 5 | (Norway) Borghild Niskin (NOR) | 13.80 | 9 | 7 | 11 |
| 5 | (Austria) Josefine Frandl (AUT) | 13.80 | 13 | 2nd place, silver medalist(s) | 5 |

- Downhill: 1 February, Giant Slalom: 27 January, Slalom: 30 January
