= Italy at the 1956 Winter Olympics =

- IOC code: ITA
- NOC: Italian National Olympic Committee
- Website: www.coni.it (in Italian)

in Cortina d'Ampezzo
- Competitors: 65 (53 men, 12 women) in 8 sports
- Flag bearer: Tito Tolin (ski jumping)
- Medals Ranked 8th: Gold 1 Silver 2 Bronze 0 Total 3

Winter Olympics appearances (overview)
- 1924; 1928; 1932; 1936; 1948; 1952; 1956; 1960; 1964; 1968; 1972; 1976; 1980; 1984; 1988; 1992; 1994; 1998; 2002; 2006; 2010; 2014; 2018; 2022; 2026

Italy was the host nation for the 1956 Winter Olympics in Cortina d'Ampezzo. It was the first time that Italy had hosted the Olympic Games.

== Medalists ==
Medal	Name	Sport	Event
Gold	Lamberto Dalla Costa; Giacomo Conti	Bobsleigh	Two-man
Silver	Eugenio Monti; Renzo Alverà	Bobsleigh	Two-man
Silver	Eugenio Monti; Ulrico Girardi; Renzo Alverà; Renato Mocellini	Bobsleigh	Four-man

== Alpine skiing ==
Men

Athlete	Event	Race 1		Race 2		Total	
Athlete	Event	Time	Rank	Time	Rank	Time	Rank
Paride Milianti	Downhill					DSQ	–
Lino Zecchini	Downhill					DSQ	–
Bruno Burrini	Downhill					3:02.4	9
Gino Burrini	Downhill					3:00.2	6
Bruno Burrini	Giant Slalom					3:23.1	25
Dino Pompanin	Giant Slalom					3:22.4	24
Guido Ghedina	Giant Slalom					3:15.6	11
Gino Burrini	Giant Slalom					3:12.3	10
Paride Milianti	Slalom	DSQ	–	–	–	DSQ	–
Italo Pedroncelli	Slalom	n/a	?	DSQ	–	DSQ	–
Bruno Burrini	Slalom	1:36.2	24	2:24.2	35	4:00.4	27
Guido Ghedina	Slalom	1:32.6	12	2:08.1	24	3:40.7	17

Women

Athlete	Event	Race 1		Race 2		Total	
Athlete	Event	Time	Rank	Time	Rank	Time	Rank
Vera Schenone	Downhill					1:59.2	36
Anna Pellissier	Downhill					1:49.7	11
Carla Marchelli	Downhill					1:47.7	6
Giuliana Chenal-Minuzzo	Downhill					1:47.3	4
Vera Schenone	Giant Slalom					DSQ	–
Maria Grazia Marchelli	Giant Slalom					2:05.2	28
Anna Pellissier	Giant Slalom					2:02.4	17
Giuliana Chenal-Minuzzo	Giant Slalom					2:01.5	13
Cristina Ebner	Slalom	DSQ	–	–	–	DSQ	–
Vera Schenone	Slalom	1:05.1	21	1:32.1	34	2:37.2	29
Anna Pellissier	Slalom	1:01.2	16	1:05.3	19	2:06.5	16
Giuliana Chenal-Minuzzo	Slalom	56.9	3	59.9	11	1:56.8	4

== Bobsleigh ==
Sled	Athletes	Event	Run 1		Run 2		Run 3		Run 4		Total	
Sled	Athletes	Event	Time	Rank	Time	Rank	Time	Rank	Time	Rank	Time	Rank
ITA-1	Lamberto Dalla Costa; Giacomo Conti	Two-man	1:22.0	1	1:22.45	1	1:22.95	1	1:22.74	1	5:30.14	1st place, gold medalist(s)
ITA-2	Eugenio Monti; Renzo Alverà	Two-man	1:22.73	2	1:22.53	2	1:23.37	2	1:22.82	2	5:31.45	2nd place, silver medalist(s)

Sled	Athletes	Event	Run 1		Run 2		Run 3		Run 4		Total	
Sled	Athletes	Event	Time	Rank	Time	Rank	Time	Rank	Time	Rank	Time	Rank
ITA-1	Dino De Martin; Giovanni De Martin; Giovanni Tabacchi; Carlo Da Prà	Four-man	1:18.10	5	1:18.65	5	1:18.50	4	1:19.41	4	5:14.66	5
ITA-2	Eugenio Monti; Ulrico Girardi; Renzo Alverà; Renato Mocellini	Four-man	1:17.69	2	1:17.97	4	1:18.13	2	1:18.31	2	5:12.10	2nd place, silver medalist(s)

== Cross-country skiing ==
Men

Event	Athlete	Race	
Event	Athlete	Time	Rank
15 km	Innocenzo Chatrian	53:46	25
15 km	Pompeo Fattor	53:45	24
15 km	Federico de Florian	52:48	17
15 km	Ottavio Compagnoni	51:42	11
30 km	Ottavio Compagnoni	DSQ	–
30 km	Camillo Zanolli	1'54:42	26
30 km	Arrigo Delladio	1'54:27	24
30 km	Federico de Florian	1'49:16	13
50 km	Battista Mismetti	3'23:15	23
50 km	Gioacchino Busin	3'21:05	21
50 km	Gianni Carrara	3'14:39	17
50 km	Vigilio Mich	3'11:59	16

Men's 4 × 10 km relay

Athletes	Race	
Athletes	Time	Rank
Pompeo Fattor; Ottavio Compagnoni; Innocenzo Chatrian; Federico de Florian	2'23:28	5

Women

Event	Athlete	Race	
Event	Athlete	Time	Rank
10 km	Anita Parmesani	47:37	37
10 km	Fides Romanin	44:17	31
10 km	Rita Bottero	44:03	30
10 km	Ildegarda Taffra	42:51	23

Women's 3 x 5 km relay

Athletes	Race	
Athletes	Time	Rank
Fides Romanin; Rita Bottero; Ildegarda Taffra	1'16:11	8

== Figure skating ==
Women

Athlete	CF	FS	Points	Places	Rank
Manuela Angeli	20	21	133.51	222	21
Fiorella Negro	16	14	142.31	168.5	15

== Ice hockey ==
=== Group A ===
Top two teams advanced to Medal Round.

Rank	Team	Pld	W	L	T	GF	GA	Pts
1	Canada	3	3	0	0	30	1	6
2	Germany	3	1	1	1	9	6	3
3	Italy	3	0	1	2	5	7	2
4	Austria	3	0	2	1	2	32	1

- Italy 2-2 Austria
- Italy 2-2 Germany (UTG)
- Italy 1-3 Canada

=== Games for 7th-10th places ===
Rank	Team	Pld	W	L	T	GF	GA	Pts
7	Italy	3	3	0	0	21	7	6
8	Poland	3	2	1	0	12	10	4
9	Switzerland	3	1	2	0	12	18	2
10	Austria	3	0	3	0	9	19	0

- Italy 8-2 Austria
- Italy 8-3 Switzerland
- Italy 5-2 Poland

Contestants; Vittorio Bolla; Giuliano Ferraris; Carmine Tucci; Carlo Montemurro; Aldo Federici; Mario Bedogni; Bernardo Tomei; Giovanni Furlani; Giampiero Branduardi; Aldo Maniacco; Ernesto Crotti; Giancarlo Agazzi; Gianfranco Darin; Reno Alberton; Giulio Oberhammer; Francesco Macchietto

== Nordic combined ==
Events:

- normal hill ski jumping (Three jumps, best two counted and shown here.)
- 15 km cross-country skiing

Athlete	Event	Ski Jumping				Cross-country			Total	
Athlete	Event	Distance 1	Distance 2	Points	Rank	Time	Points	Rank	Points	Rank
Aldo Pedrana	Individual	60.5	60.0	168.0	35	1'00:36	223.400	15	391.400	31
Enzo Perin	Individual	67.0	70.0	196.0	19	1'00:48	222.600	18	418.600	20
Alfredo Prucker	Individual	70.0	70.0	201.0	12	58:52	230.100	10	431.100	8

== Ski jumping ==
Athlete	Event	Jump 1			Jump 2			Total	
Athlete	Event	Distance	Points	Rank	Distance	Points	Rank	Points	Rank
Enzo Perin	Normal hill	67.0	83.5	47	63.5	80.5	47	164.0	48
Alfredo Prucker	Normal hill	67.5	88.0	41	68.5	91.5	32	179.5	38
Tito Tolin	Normal hill	69.5	91.0	36	71.5	93.5	27	184.5	33
Luigi Pennacchio	Normal hill	70.5	91.0	36	67.5	89.5	36	180.5	37

== Speed skating ==
Men

Event	Athlete	Race	
Event	Athlete	Time	Rank
500 m	Guido Caroli	43.9	33
500 m	Guido Citterio	43.1	22
1500 m	Remo Tomasi	2:22.2	48
1500 m	Guido Caroli	2:20.0	42
1500 m	Guido Citterio	2:16.5	27
5000 m	Remo Tomasi	8:48.3	45
5000 m	Paolino Dimai	8:48.0	44
5000 m	Carlo Calzà	8:41.1	41
10,000 m	Carlo Calzà	18:32.8	32

== Sources ==
- Official Olympic Reports
- International Olympic Committee results database
- Olympic Winter Games 1956, full results by sports-reference.com
