= United Team of Germany at the 1956 Winter Olympics =

- Flag of Germany, which was used at the time by both East Germany (until 1959) and West Germany
- IOC code: EUA
- NOC: United Team of Germany

in Cortina d'Ampezzo
- Competitors: 63 (52 men, 11 women) in 8 sports
- Flag bearer: Andreas Ostler (bobsleigh)
- Medals Ranked 9th: Gold 1 Silver 0 Bronze 1 Total 2

Winter Olympics appearances (overview)
- 1956; 1960; 1964

Other related appearances
- Germany (1928–1936, 1952, 1992–pres.); East Germany (1968–1988); West Germany (1968–1988)

Germany was represented at the 1956 Winter Olympics in Cortina d'Ampezzo, Italy by a United Team of Germany of athletes from the Federal Republic of Germany (FRG, West Germany) and, for the first time, also from the German Democratic Republic (GDR, East Germany) which had not joined in 1952.

2 medals were scored by the team against the emerging competition. Rosa "Ossi" Reichert won gold at the women's giant slalom, and Harry Glaß took bronze in the K90 individual jump.

== Medalists ==
Medal	Name	Nationality	Sport	Event	Date
Gold	Ossi Reichert	West Germany	Alpine skiing	Women's giant slalom	January 27
Bronze	Harry Glaß	East Germany	Ski jumping	Men's normal hill	February 5

== Alpine skiing ==
Men

Athlete	Event	Race 1		Race 2		Total	
Athlete	Event	Time	Rank	Time	Rank	Time	Rank
Pepi Schwaiger	Downhill					3:22.2	20
Karl Zillibiller	Downhill					3:21.6	19
Sepp Behr	Downhill					3:07.7	12
Hans Peter Lanig	Downhill					2:59.8	5
Beni Obermüller	Giant Slalom					3:42.9	48
Pepi Schwaiger	Giant Slalom					3:23.5	26
Sepp Behr	Giant Slalom					3:11.4	8
Hans Peter Lanig	Giant Slalom					3:08.6	7
Rochus Wagner	Slalom	1:48.7	32	2:28.7 (+0:05)	42	4:17.4	34
Karl Zillibiller	Slalom	1:36.6	26	2:23.6	34	4:00.2	25
Sepp Behr	Slalom	1:33.3	15	DSQ	–	DSQ	–
Beni Obermüller	Slalom	1:32.3	10	1:55.2	10	3:27.5	9

Women

Athlete	Event	Race 1		Race 2		Total	
Athlete	Event	Time	Rank	Time	Rank	Time	Rank
Mirl Buchner	Downhill					DNF	–
Sonja Sperl	Downhill					1:57.8	32
Hannelore Glaser-Franke	Downhill					1:54.7	29
Ossi Reichert	Downhill					1:52.3	20
Mirl Buchner	Giant Slalom					2:05.0	27
Hannelore Glaser-Franke	Giant Slalom					2:02.7	19
Marianne Seltsam	Giant Slalom					2:01.4	12
Ossi Reichert	Giant Slalom					1:56.5	1st place, gold medalist(s)
Marianne Seltsam	Slalom	DSQ	–	–	–	DSQ	–
Ossi Reichert	Slalom	1:07.8	24	DSQ	–	DSQ	–
Hannelore Glaser-Franke	Slalom	1:01.8	19	1:02.9	17	2:04.7	14
Mirl Buchner	Slalom	1:01.7	18	1:16.8	28	2:18.5	21

== Bobsleigh ==
Sled	Athletes	Event	Run 1		Run 2		Run 3		Run 4		Total	
Sled	Athletes	Event	Time	Rank	Time	Rank	Time	Rank	Time	Rank	Time	Rank
GER-1	Hans Rösch; Lorenz Nieberl	Two-man	1:26.92	14	1:24.08	6	1:25.21	9	1:25.13	6	5:41.34	9
GER-2	Andreas Ostler; Hans Hohenester	Two-man	1:24.63	4	1:24.89	10	1:25.07	8	1:25.54	8	5:40.13	8

Sled	Athletes	Event	Run 1		Run 2		Run 3		Run 4		Total	
Sled	Athletes	Event	Time	Rank	Time	Rank	Time	Rank	Time	Rank	Time	Rank
GER-1	Hans Rösch; Michael Pössinger; Lorenz Nieberl; Sylvester Wackerle	Four-man	1:18.61	6	1:19.04	8	1:19.43	7	1:20.94	13	5:18.02	6
GER-2	Franz Schelle; Jakob Nirschl; Hans Henn; Edmund Koller	Four-man	1:19.03	9	1:18.84	7	1:19.31	6	1:21.32	15	5:18.50	8

== Cross-country skiing ==
Men

Event	Athlete	Race	
Event	Athlete	Time	Rank
15 km	Helmut Hagg	56:50	46
15 km	Rudi Kopp	54:31	31
15 km	Siegfried Weiß	54:29	29
15 km	Kuno Werner	54:18	27
30 km	Werner Moring	2'00:55	40
30 km	Erich Lindenlaub	1'58:30	33
30 km	Hermann Möchel	1'56:34	30
50 km	Werner Moring	3'20:32	20

Men's 4 × 10 km relay

Athletes	Race	
Athletes	Time	Rank
Kuno Werner; Siegfried Weiß; Rudi Kopp; Hermann Möchel	2'26:37	10

Women

Event	Athlete	Race	
Event	Athlete	Time	Rank
10 km	Rita Czech-Blasl	43:51	29
10 km	Elfriede Spiegelhauer-Uhlig	43:15	26
10 km	Else Amann	42:22	20
10 km	Sonnhilde Hausschild-Kallus	42:22	20

Women's 3 x 5 km relay

Athletes	Race	
Athletes	Time	Rank
Elfriede Spiegelhauer-Uhlig; Else Amann; Sonnhilde Hausschild-Kallus	1'15:33	7

== Figure skating ==
Men

Athlete	CF	FS	Points	Places	Rank
Tilo Gutzeit	10	11	141.08	90	10

Women

Athlete	CF	FS	Points	Places	Rank
Rosel Pettinger	11	6	152.04	101	10

Pairs

Athletes	Points	Places	Rank
Marika Kilius; Franz Ningel	10.98	35.5	4

== Ice hockey ==
=== Group A ===
Top two teams advanced to Medal Round.

Rank	Team	Pld	W	L	T	GF	GA	Pts
1	Canada	3	3	0	0	30	1	6
2	Germany	3	1	1	1	9	6	3
3	Italy	3	0	1	2	5	7	2
4	Austria	3	0	2	1	2	32	1

- Canada 4-0 Germany
- Italy 2-2 Germany
- Germany 7-0 Austria

=== Games for 1st-6th places ===
Rank	Team	Pld	W	L	T	GF	GA	Pts
1	Soviet Union	5	5	0	0	25	5	10
2	United States	5	4	1	0	26	12	8
3	Canada	5	3	2	0	23	11	6
4	Sweden	5	1	3	1	10	17	3
5	Czechoslovakia	5	1	4	0	20	30	2
6	Germany	5	0	4	1	6	35	1

- USA 7-2 Germany
- USSR 8-0 Germany
- Canada 10-0 Germany
- Czechoslovakia 9-3 Germany
- Germany 1-1 Sweden

Contestants; Ulli Jansen; Alfred Hoffmann; Toni Biersack; Bruno Guttowski; Martin Beck; Paul Ambros; Karl Bierschel; Kurt Sepp; Markus Egen; Ernst Trautwein; Rudolf Pittrich; Hans Huber; Arthur Endress; Reiner Kossmann; Hans Rampf; Martin Zach; Günther Jochems

== Nordic combined ==
Events:

- normal hill ski jumping (Three jumps, best two counted and shown here.)
- 15 km cross-country skiing

Athlete	Event	Ski Jumping				Cross-country			Total	
Athlete	Event	Distance 1	Distance 2	Points	Rank	Time	Points	Rank	Points	Rank
Helmut Böck	Individual	66.0	66.5	190.0	24	59:13	228.700	11	418.700	19
Gerhard Glaß	Individual	72.0	72.5	203.5	9	1'04:17	209.100	30	412.600	24
Herbert Leonhardt	Individual	62.0	62.0	177.0	32	1'01:34	219.600	23	396.600	28
Heinz Hauser	Individual	71.0	67.5	195.0	20	1'00:43	222.900	17	417.900	21

== Ski jumping ==
Athlete	Event	Jump 1			Jump 2			Total	
Athlete	Event	Distance	Points	Rank	Distance	Points	Rank	Points	Rank
Sepp Kleisl	Normal hill	73.0	95.0	29	71.0	94.0	26	189.0	26
Werner Lesser	Normal hill	77.5	105.0	10	77.5	105.0	8	210.0	8
Max Bolkart	Normal hill	80.0	111.5	3	81.5	111.0	4	222.5	4
Harry Glaß	Normal hill	83.5	115.0	1	80.5	109.5	7	224.5	3rd place, bronze medalist(s)

== Speed skating ==
Men

Event	Athlete	Race	
Event	Athlete	Time	Rank
500 m	Helmut Kuhnert	44.0	34
1500 m	Hans Keller	2:18.1	35
5000 m	Hans Keller	8:24.5	30
5000 m	Helmut Kuhnert	8:04.8	9
10,000 m	Hans Keller	17:27.7	21
10,000 m	Helmut Kuhnert	17:04.6	10
