= Nordic combined at the 1956 Winter Olympics =

Nordic combined at the VII Olympic Winter Games
- Venue: Trampolino Olimpico (ski jumping); Lo Stadio della neve (cross-country skiing)
- Dates: 29–31 January 1956
- Competitors: 36 from 12 nations
- Winning Score: 457.95

Medalists
1st place, gold medalist(s)		Sverre Stenersen	Norway
2nd place, silver medalist(s)		Bengt Eriksson	Sweden
3rd place, bronze medalist(s)		Franciszek Gąsienica Groń	Poland

Nordic combined at the 1956 Winter Olympics consisted of one event, held from 29 January to 31 January. The ski jumping portion took place at Trampolino Olimpico, while the cross-country portion took place at Lo Stadio della neve.

Standings were determined by the combined length of 3 jumps per entrant and combined style points (best 2 out of 3), awarded by a pool of 5 international judges. The cross-country course had a vertical drop of 185 m (607 ft), a maximum climb of 150 m (490 ft) and a 420 m (1,380 ft) total climb.

== Medal summary ==
=== Medal table ===
Rank	Nation	Gold	Silver	Bronze	Total
1	Norway	1	0	0	1
2	Sweden	0	1	0	1
3	Poland	0	0	1	1
Totals (3 entries)		1	1	1	3

Franciszek Gąsienica Groń's bronze medal was the first, and as of 2010, only, medal for Poland in Nordic combined.

=== Events ===
Event	Gold		Silver		Bronze	
Individual	Sverre Stenersen; Norway	455.00	Bengt Eriksson; Sweden	437.40	Franciszek Gąsienica Gron; Poland	436.80

== Individual ==
Athletes did three normal hill ski jumps, with the lowest score dropped. They then raced a 15 kilometre cross-country course, with the time converted to points. The athlete with the highest combined points score was awarded the gold medal.

Rank	Name	Country	Ski Jumping					Cross-country			Total
Rank	Name	Country	Jump 1	Jump 2	Jump 3	Total	Rank	Time	Points	Rank	Total
1st place, gold medalist(s)	Sverre Stenersen	Norway	~~95.5~~	107.5	107.5	215.0	2	56:18	240.00	1	455.00
2nd place, silver medalist(s)	Bengt Eriksson	Sweden	108.0	106.0	~~99.5~~	214.0	3	1:00:36	223.40	15	437.40
3rd place, bronze medalist(s)	Franciszek Gąsienica Groń	Poland	~~60.0~~	101.5	101.5	203.0	10	57:55	233.80	7	436.80
4	Paavo Korhonen	Finland	97.0	~~96.5~~	99.5	196.5	17	56:32	239.10	2	435.60
5	Arne Barhaugen	Norway	99.0	~~98.5~~	100.0	199.0	15	57:11	236.58	3	435.58
6	Tormod Knutsen	Norway	~~89.5~~	103.5	99.5	203.0	10	58:22	232.00	9	435.00
7	Nikolay Gusakov	Soviet Union	98.0	102.0	~~96.5~~	200.0	14	58:17	232.30	8	432.30
8	Alfredo Prucker	Italy	101.0	100.0	~~95.0~~	201.0	12	58:52	230.10	10	431.10
9	Eeti Nieminen	Finland	~~99.5~~	105.0	101.0	206.0	8	1:00:20	224.40	14	430.40
10	Leonid Fyodorov	Soviet Union	101.0	100.0	~~98.0~~	201.0	12	59:17	228.50	12	429.50
11	Sepp Schiffner	Austria	105.0	106.5	~~104.0~~	211.5	4	1:02:02	217.80	25	429.30
12	Vítězslav Lahr	Czechoslovakia	~~92.0~~	98.0	95.0	193.0	22	57:39	234.80	5	427.80
13	Yury Moshkin	Soviet Union	110.5	~~83.5~~	107.0	217.5	1	1:04:18	209.10	30	426.60
14	Kjetil Mårdalen	Norway	93.0	~~92.5~~	96.0	189.0	26	57:43	234.50	6	423.50
15	Aleksander Kowalski	Poland	~~99.0~~	104.5	106.0	210.5	5	1:03:37	211.70	29	422.20
16	Willi Egger	Austria	~~102.0~~	105.0	103.0	208.0	7	1:03:00	214.10	28	422.10
17	Leopold Kohl	Austria	97.5	101.0	~~95.5~~	198.5	16	1:01:00	221.80	21	420.30
18	Vlastimil Melich	Czechoslovakia	~~88.5~~	90.5	93.0	183.5	28	57:18	236.10	4	419.60
19	Helmut Böck	United Team of Germany	97.0	93.0	~~91.5~~	190.0	24	59:13	228.70	11	418.70
20	Enzo Perin	Italy	97.5	98.5	~~95.5~~	196.0	19	1:00:48	222.60	18	418.60
21	Heinz Hauser	United Team of Germany	~~93.0~~	101.0	94.0	195.0	20	1:00:43	222.90	17	417.90
22	Josef Nüsser	Czechoslovakia	~~92.5~~	95.5	94.0	189.5	25	59:28	227.80	13	417.30
23	Marvin Crawford	United States	~~96.5~~	97.5	99.0	196.5	17	1:02:24	216.40	26	412.90
24	Gerhard Glaß	United Team of Germany	103.0	100.5	~~77.0~~	203.5	9	1:04:17	209.10	30	412.60
25	Esko Jussila	Finland	96.5	97.5	~~95.0~~	194.0	21	1:02:38	215.50	27	409.50
26	Uno Kajak	Soviet Union	~~84.0~~	92.0	94.5	186.5	27	1:00:48	222.60	18	409.10
27	Irvin Servold	Canada	91.0	89.0	~~87.5~~	180.0	31	1:01:44	219.00	24	399.00
28	Herbert Leonhardt	United Team of Germany	~~79.5~~	89.0	88.0	177.0	32	1:01:34	219.60	23	396.60
29	Józef Daniel Krzeptowski	Poland	~~78.0~~	87.5	86.0	173.5	33	1:00:48	222.60	18	396.10
30	Theodore Farwell, Jr.	United States	88.5	~~83.0~~	85.0	173.5	33	1:01:21	220.50	22	394.00
31	Aldo Pedrana	Italy	85.0	~~79.5~~	83.0	168.0	35	1:00:36	223.40	15	391.40
32	Jan Raszka	Poland	~~89.0~~	91.5	91.0	182.5	29	1:05:15	205.40	32	387.90
33	Koichi Sato	Japan	~~93.0~~	98.0	93.5	191.5	23	1:08:21	193.40	35	384.90
34	Charles Tremblay	United States	~~88.0~~	91.0	91.0	182.0	30	1:07:40	196.00	34	378.00
35	Buck Levy	United States	~~72.5~~	80.5	81.5	162.0	36	1:05:42	203.60	33	365.60
-	Hiroshi Yoshizawa	Japan	~~98.0~~	106.5	104.0	210.5	5	DNF	DNF	-	-

== Participating National Olympic Committees ==
Twelve nations participated in Nordic combined at the Cortina Games. The Soviet Union made their Olympic Nordic combined debut.

- Austria (3)
- Canada (1)
- Finland (3)
- United Team of Germany (4)
- Italy (3)
- Japan (2)
- Norway (4)
- Poland (4)
- Sweden (1)
- Czechoslovakia (3)
- Soviet Union (4)
- United States (4)
