= Bragaglia =

Bragaglia is an Italian surname. Notable people with the surname include:

- Alberto Bragaglia (1896–1985), Italian painter
- Anton Giulio Bragaglia (1890–1960), Italian Futurist photographer, film director and writer
- Antonella Bragaglia (born 1973), Italian volleyball player
- Arturo Bragaglia (1893–1962), Italian actor
- Carlo Ludovico Bragaglia (1894–1998), Italian film director
- Leonardo Bragaglia (c. 1932–2020), Italian actor, director and essayist
- Pietro Bragaglia, Italian gymnast
- Rolando Bragaglia, Italian figure skater
