= Cross-country skiing at the 1956 Winter Olympics – Men's 50 kilometre =

Men's 50 km at the VII Olympic Winter Games
- Cross-country skiing
- Venue: Lo Stadio della neve
- Date: 2 February 1956
- Competitors: 33 from 13 nations
- Winning time: 2:50:27

Medalists
1st place, gold medalist(s)		Sixten Jernberg	Sweden
2nd place, silver medalist(s)		Veikko Hakulinen	Finland
3rd place, bronze medalist(s)		Fedor Terentyev	Soviet Union

The men's 50 kilometre cross-country race at the 1956 Winter Olympics took place on 2 February. It was held at the Snow Stadium (Lo Stadio della neve), which was about 2 km (1.2 mi) from Cortina. Thirty skiers from thirteen countries participated in the event. The Nordic countries once again dominated the event. In a reversal of the top two results in the 30 km (19 mi) race, Swedish skier Sixten Jernberg won the gold, Finn Veikko Hakulinen took the silver and Russian Fedor Terentjev won the bronze. Jernberg would go on to win a bronze in the relay event giving him a full complement of gold, silver and bronze. Hakulinen would win a silver in the relay event giving him a gold and two silver medals for the Olympics.

== Medalists ==
Gold	Sixten Jernberg; Sweden
Silver	Veikko Hakulinen; Finland
Bronze	Fedor Terentyev; Soviet Union

== Results ==
Place	No.	Competitor	Time	Difference*
1	38	Sixten Jernberg (SWE)	2:50.27	
2	33	Veikko Hakulinen (FIN)	2:51.45	+1.18
3	2	Fedor Terentyev (URS)	2:53.32	+3.05
4	23	Eero Kolehmainen (FIN)	2:56.17	+5.50
5	20	Anatoly Shelyukhin (URS)	2:56.40	+6.13
6	8	Pavel Kolchin (URS)	2:58.00	+8.33
7	30	Viktor Baranov (URS)	3:03.55	+13.28
8	4	Antti Sivonen (FIN)	3:04.16	+13.49
9	12	Veini Kontinen (FIN)	3:06.15	+15.48
10	5	Sture Grahn (SWE)	3:06.32	+16.05
11	7	Arthur Ohlsson (SWE)	3:10.03	+19.36
12	18	Inge Limberg (SWE)	3:10.19	+19.52
13	25	Stanislav Bukowski (POL)	3:10.49	+20.22
14	9	Oddmund Jensen (NOR)	3:11.14	+20.47
15	21	Edvin Landsem (NOR)	3:11.43	+21.16
16	14	Vigilio Mich (ITA)	3:11.59	+21.32
17	36	Gianni Carrara (ITA)	3:14.39	+24.12
18	29	Christian Wenger (SUI)	3:17.49	+27.22
19	11	Fritz Zurbuchen (SUI)	3:19.42	+29.15
20	15	Werner Moring (EUA)	3:20.32	+30.05
21	10	Gioacchino Busin (ITA)	3:21.05	+30.38
22	31	Clarence Servold (CAN)	3:21.50	+31.23
23	1	Battista Mismetti (ITA)	3:23.15	+32.48
24	17	Alfred Kronig (SUI)	3:23.21	+32.54
25	28	Tatsuo Miyao (JPN)	3:25.47	+35.20
26	32	Christo Dontchev (BUL)	3:26.06	+35.39
27	3	Andre Huguenin (SUI)	3:31.04	+40.37
28	39	Thomas Cairney (GBR)	3:44.54	+54.17
29	24	Toby Graham (GBR)	3:48.17	+57.50
30	13	Richard Aylmer (GBR)	4:11.40	+1:21.13
AC		Birger Vestermo (NOR)		DQ
AC		Štefan Robač (YUG)		DQ
AC		Martin Stokken (NOR)		DQ

* - Difference is in hours:minutes.seconds.

== See also ==
- List of IOC country codes
- 1956 Winter Olympics
