= Burrini =

Burrini is an Italian surname. Notable people with the surname include:

- Bruno Burrini (1931–2017), Italian alpine skier
- Gino Burrini (1934–2022), Italian alpine skier, brother of Bruno
- Giovanni Antonio Burrini (1656–1727), Italian painter
