= List of Winter Olympics venues: T–Z =

For the Winter Olympics, there are eight venues that start with the letter 'T', three venues that start with the letter 'U', two venues that start with the letter 'V', no venues that start with the letters 'X' and 'Y', and two venues that start with the letter 'Z'.

== T ==
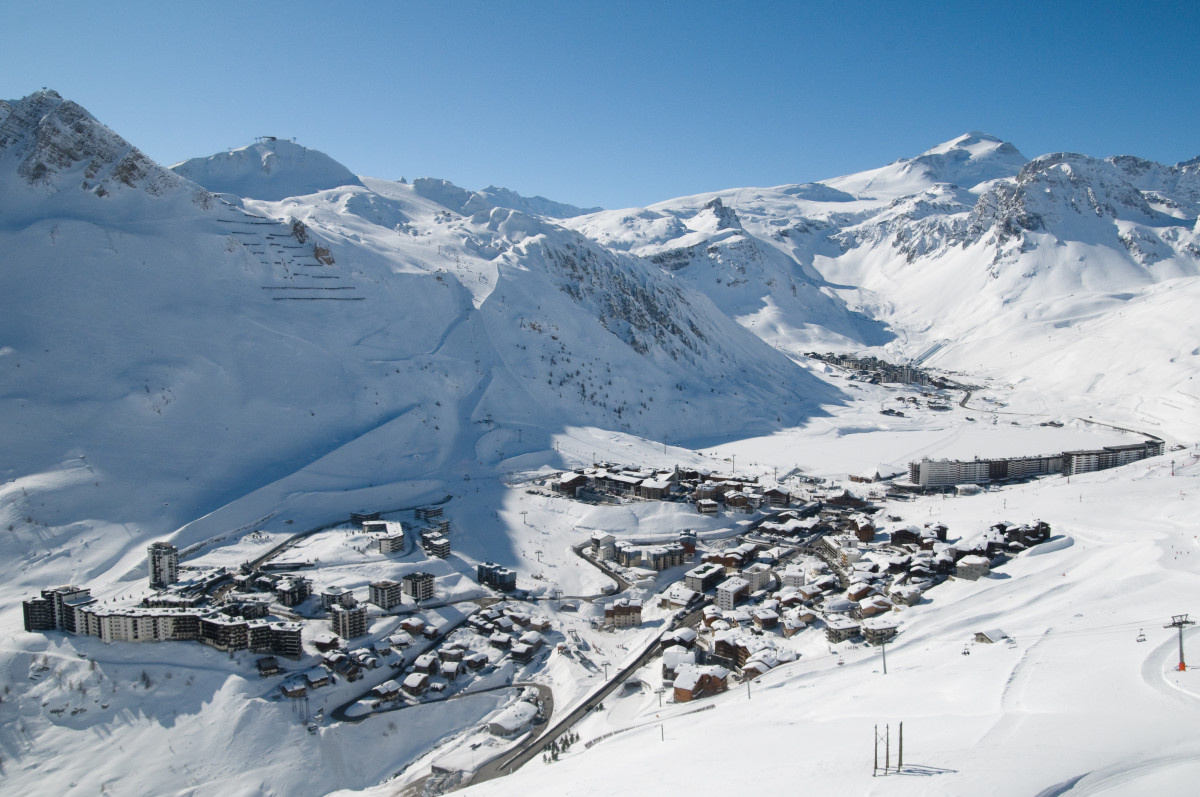
Tignes hosted the freestyle skiing events for the 1992 Winter Olympics held in neighboring Albertville.

Venue	Games	Sports	Capacity	Ref.
The Ice Sheet at Ogden	2002 Salt Lake City	Curling	2,000	
The Whistler Sliding Centre	2010 Vancouver	Bobsleigh, luge, skeleton	12,000	
Théâtre des Cérémonies	1992 Albertville	Ceremonies (opening/ closing)	Not listed.	
Tignes	1992 Albertville	Freestyle skiing	Not listed.	
Torino Esposizioni	2006 Turin	Ice hockey	5,400	
Trampolino Italia	1956 Cortina d'ampezzo	Nordic combined (ski jumping), Ski jumping	46,152	
Tremplin du Praz	1992 Albertville	Nordic combined, Ski jumping	20,000 (jumping); 15,000 (Nordic combined – cross-country skiing)	
Trebević	1984 Sarajevo	Bobsleigh, Luge	4,000 (luge); 7,500 (bobsleigh)	
Tsukisamu Indoor Skating Rink	1972 Sapporo	Ice hockey	6,000	

== U ==
Venue	Games	Sports	Capacity	Ref.
UBC Thunderbird Arena	2010 Vancouver	Ice hockey	7,200	
Utah Olympic Oval	2002 Salt Lake City	Speed skating	5,236	
Utah Olympic Park (bobsleigh, luge, and skeleton track)	2002 Salt Lake City	Bobsleigh, Luge, Nordic combined (ski jumping), Skeleton, ski jumping	18,100(ski jumping); 15,000 (bobsleigh, luge, skeleton)	

== V ==
Venue	Games	Sports	Capacity	Ref.
Val-d'Isère	1992 Albertville	Alpine skiing (men's downhill, super-giant slalom, giant slalom, and combined)	Not listed.	
Vancouver Olympic/Paralympic Centre	2010 Vancouver	Curling	6,000	

== W ==
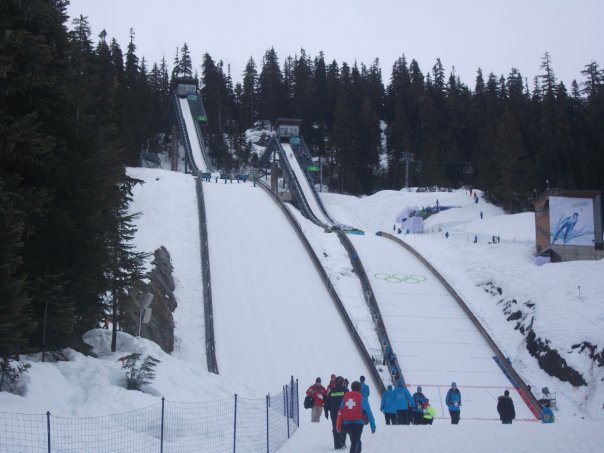
Whistler Olympic Park hosted the biathlon, cross country skiing, Nordic combined, and ski jumping events for the 2010 Winter Olympics in neighboring Vancouver.

Venue	Games	Sports	Capacity	Ref.
Whistler Creekside	2010 Vancouver	Alpine skiing	7,600	
Whistler Olympic Park	2010 Vancouver	Biathlon, cross-country skiing, Nordic combined, ski jumping	6,000	
White Ring	1998 Nagano	Figure skating, Short track speed skating	7,351	
Whiteface Mountain	1980 Lake Placid	Alpine skiing	Not listed	
Wukesong Sports Centre	2022 Beijing	Ice hockey	18,000	

== X ==
There are no venues that start with the letter 'X'. This includes the 2014 Winter Olympics in Sochi.

== Y ==
There are no venues that start with the letter 'Y'. This includes the 2014 Winter Olympics in Sochi.

== Z ==
Venue	Games	Sports	Capacity	Ref.
Zetra Ice Hall	1984 Sarajevo	Closing ceremonies, Figure skating, Ice hockey (final)	15,000	
Zetra Ice Rink	1984 Sarajevo	Speed skating	Not listed	
