= List of Olympic venues in Nordic combined =

For the Winter Olympics, there are 36 venues that have been or will be used for Nordic combined. With the sport being a combination of cross-country skiing and ski jumping, the sport shares its venues with the other two sports. It is one of the sports that have been at every Winter Olympics, but will not be contested at the 2030 Winter Olympics in the French Alps.

Games	Venue	Other sports hosted at venue for those games	Capacity	Ref.
1924 Chamonix	Le Tremplin Olympique du Mont (ski jumping)	Ski jumping	Not listed.	
1924 Chamonix	Stade Olympique de Chamonix (cross-country skiing)	Cross-country skiing, Curling, Figure skating, Ice hockey, Military patrol, Speed skating	45,000.	
1928 St. Moritz	Around the hills of St. Moritz (cross-country skiing)	Cross-country skiing	Not listed.	
1928 St. Moritz	Olympiaschanze St. Moritz (ski jumping)	Ski jumping	Not listed.	
1932 Lake Placid	Intervales Ski-Hill (ski jumping)	Ski jumping	9200	
1932 Lake Placid	Lake Placid (cross-country skiing)	Cross-country skiing	Not listed.	
1936 Garmisch-Partenkirchen	Große Olympiaschanze	Cross-country skiing, Ski jumping	40,000	
1948 St. Moritz	Around the hills of St. Moritz (cross-country skiing)	Cross-country skiing	Not listed.	
1948 St. Moritz	Olympiaschanze St. Moritz (ski jumping)	Ski jumping	Not listed.	
1952 Oslo	Holmenkollen National Arena	Cross-country skiing, Ski jumping	150,000	
1956 Cortina d'Ampezzo	Lo Stadio della neve (cross-country skiing)	Cross-country skiing	9,650	
1956 Cortina d'Ampezzo	Trampolino Italia (ski jumping)	Ski jumping	46,152	
1960 Squaw Valley	McKinney Creek Stadium (cross-country skiing)	Biathlon, Cross-country skiing	1,000	
1960 Squaw Valley	Ski jumping hill (ski jumping)	Ski jumping	Not listed.	
1964 Innsbruck	Seefeld	Biathlon, Cross-country skiing, Nordic combined, Ski jumping (normal hill)	Not listed.	
1968 Grenoble	Autrans	Biathlon, Cross-country skiing, Ski jumping (normal hill)	40,000 (ski jump)	
1972 Sapporo	Makomanai Cross-country site (cross-country skiing)	Cross-country skiing	Not listed.	
1972 Sapporo	Miyanomori Jumping Hill (ski jumping)	Ski jumping (normal hill)	Not listed.	
1976 Innsbruck	Seefeld	Biathlon, Cross-country skiing, Nordic combined, Ski jumping (normal hill)	Not listed.	
1980 Lake Placid	Intervales Ski-Hill (ski jumping)	Ski jumping	18,000	
1980 Lake Placid	Lake Placid Olympic Sports Complex Cross Country Biathlon Center (cross-country skiing)	Biathlon, Cross-country skiing	Not listed.	
1984 Sarajevo	Igman, Malo Polje (ski jumping)	Ski jumping	Not listed.	
1984 Sarajevo	Igman, Veliko Polje (cross-country skiing)	Biathlon, Cross-country skiing	Not listed.	
1988 Calgary	Canada Olympic Park (includes bobsleigh/luge track) (ski jumping)	Bobsleigh, Freestyle skiing (demonstration), Luge, Ski jumping	25,000 (bobsleigh/luge); 35,000 (ski jumping); 15,000 (freestyle)	
1988 Calgary	Canmore Nordic Centre (cross-country skiing)	Biathlon, Cross-country skiing	Not listed.	
1992 Albertville	Tremplin du Praz	Ski jumping	20,000 (jumping); 15,000 (Nordic combined - cross-country skiing)	
1994 Lillehammer	Birkebeineren Skistadion (cross-country skiing)	Biathlon, Cross-country skiing	31,000 (Cross-country skiing); 13,500 (Biathlon)	
1994 Lillehammer	Lysgårdsbakkene Ski Jumping Arena (ski jumping)	Ski jumping, Ceremonies (opening/closing)	35,000	
1998 Nagano	Hakuba Ski Jumping Stadium (ski jumping)	Ski jumping	45,000	
1998 Nagano	Snow Harp (cross-country skiing)	Cross-country skiing	20,000	
2002 Salt Lake City	Soldier Hollow (cross-country skiing)	Biathlon, Cross-country skiing	15,200	
2002 Salt Lake City	Utah Olympic Park Jumps (includes bobsleigh, luge, and skeleton track) (ski jumping)	Bobsleigh, Luge, Skeleton, Ski Jumping	18,100(ski jumping); 15,000 (bobsleigh, luge, skeleton)	
2006 Turin	Pragelato (ski jumping)	Ski jumping	8,055	
2006 Turin	Pragelato Plan (cross-country skiing)	Cross-country skiing	5,400	
2010 Vancouver	Whistler Olympic Park	Biathlon, Cross-country skiing, ski jumping	6,000	
2014 Sochi	Biathlon & Ski Complex (cross-country skiing)	Biathlon, Cross-country skiing	9,600 (biathlon); 9,600 (cross-country skiing)	
2014 Sochi	RusSki Gorki Jumping Center (ski jumping)	Ski jumping	9,600	
2018 Pyeongchang	Alpensia Ski Jumping Centre (ski jumping)	Ski jumping	8,500 (including 2,200 standing)	
2018 Pyeongchang	Alpensia Cross-Country Skiing Centre (cross-country skiing)	Cross-country skiing	7,500 (including 3,000 standing)	
2022 Beijing	Snow Ruyi National Ski Jumping Centre (ski jumping)	Ski jumping	6,000	
2022 Beijing	Zhangjiakou National Cross-Country Centre (cross-country skiing)	Cross-country skiing	Not listed.	
2026 Milan-Cortina	"Giuseppe Dal Ben" Ski Jumping Arena (ski jumping)	Ski jumping	Not listed.	
2026 Milan-Cortina	Cross country and biathlon center Fabio Canal (cross-country skiing)	Cross-country skiing	50,000 (max capacity)	

== Gallery of venues ==
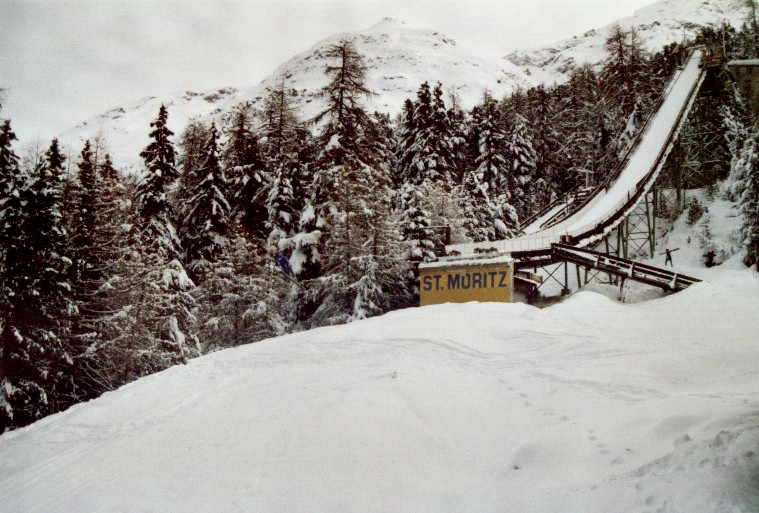
Olympiaschanze St. Moritz hosted the ski jumping portion of the Nordic combined at the 1928 and the 1948 Winter Olympics.

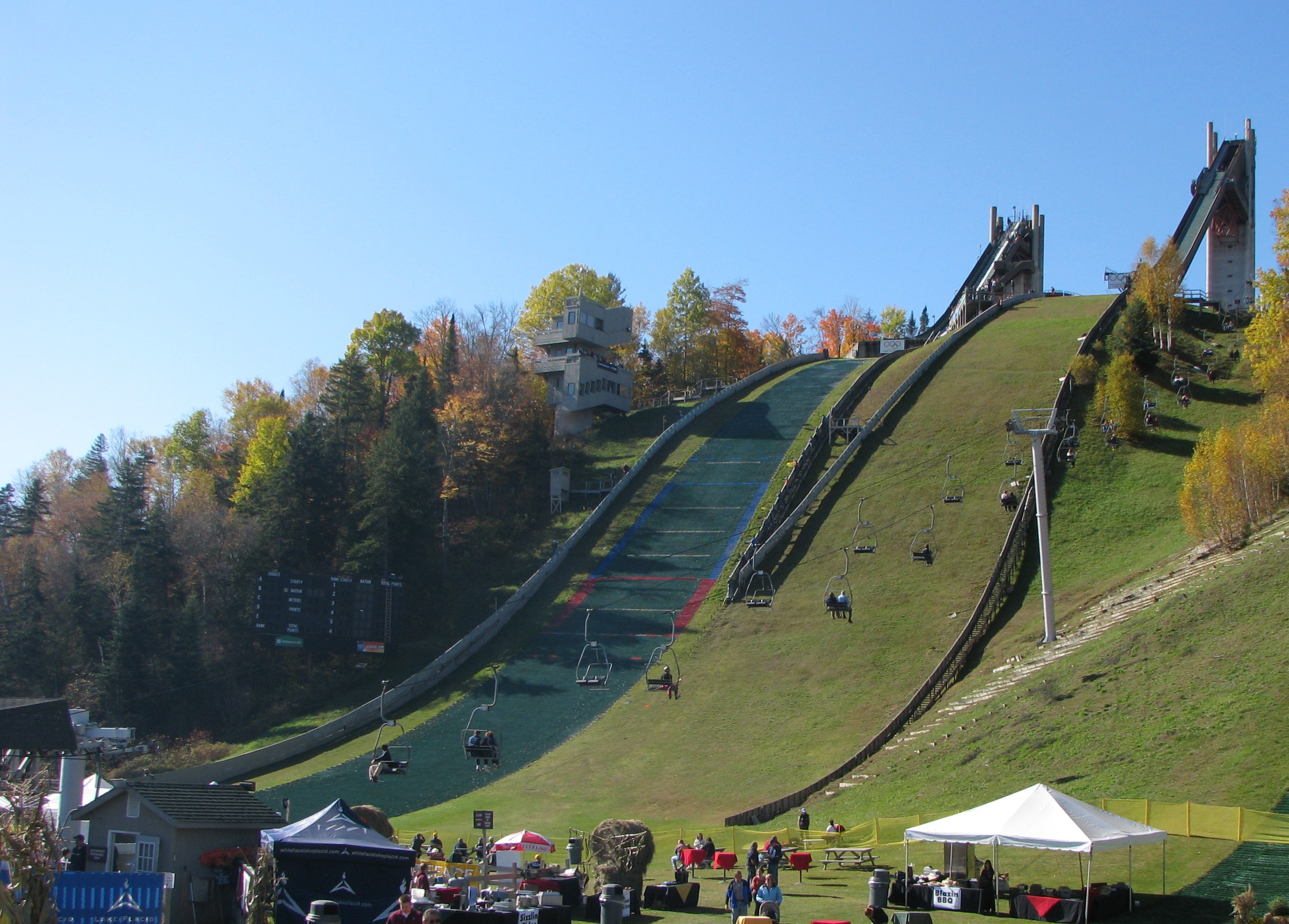
Lake Placid Olympic Ski Jumping Complex hosted the ski jumping portion of Nordic combined at the 1932 and 1980 Winter Olympics.

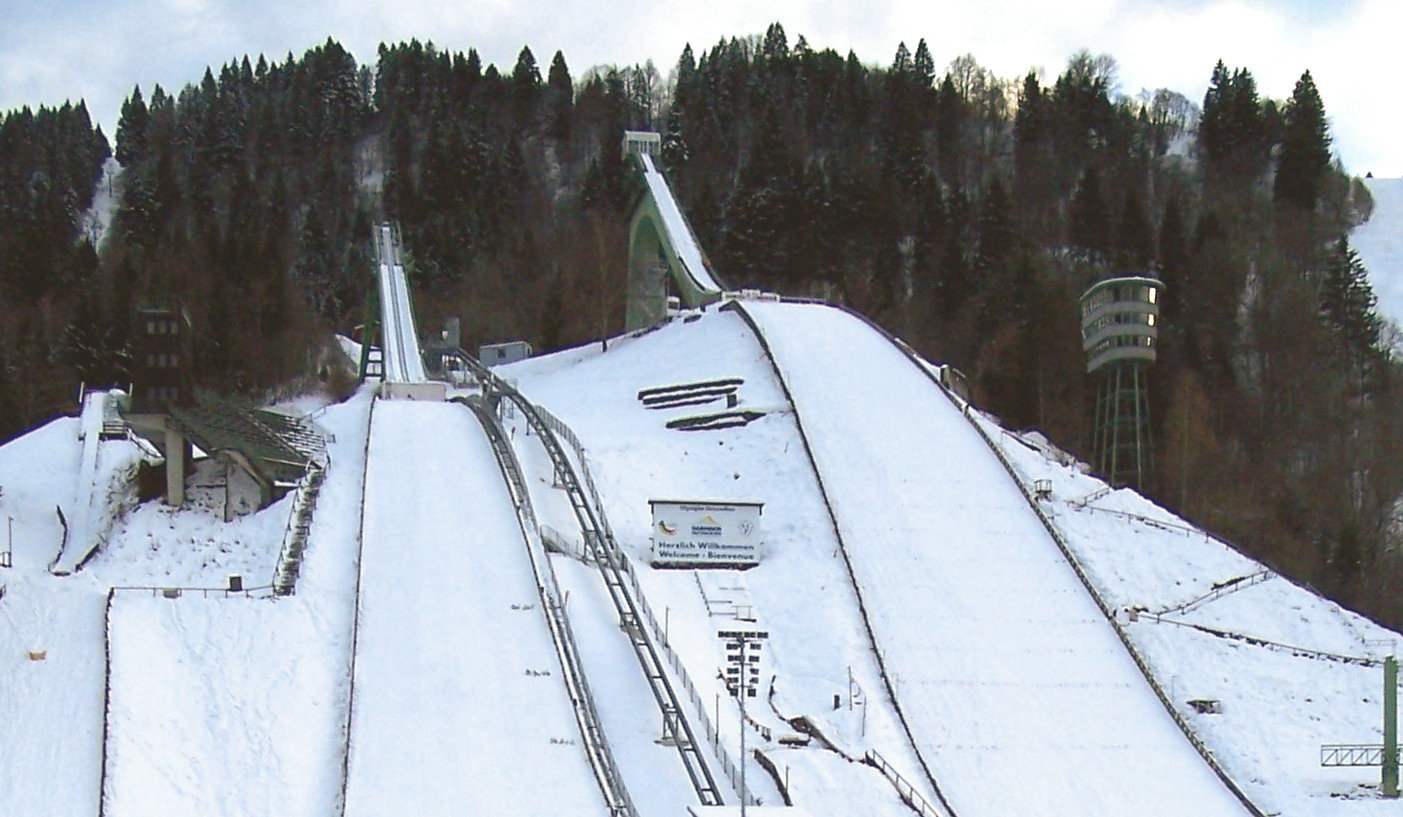
Große Olympiaschanze hosted the ski jumping portion of Nordic combined at the 1936 Winter Olympics in Garmisch-Partenkirchen.

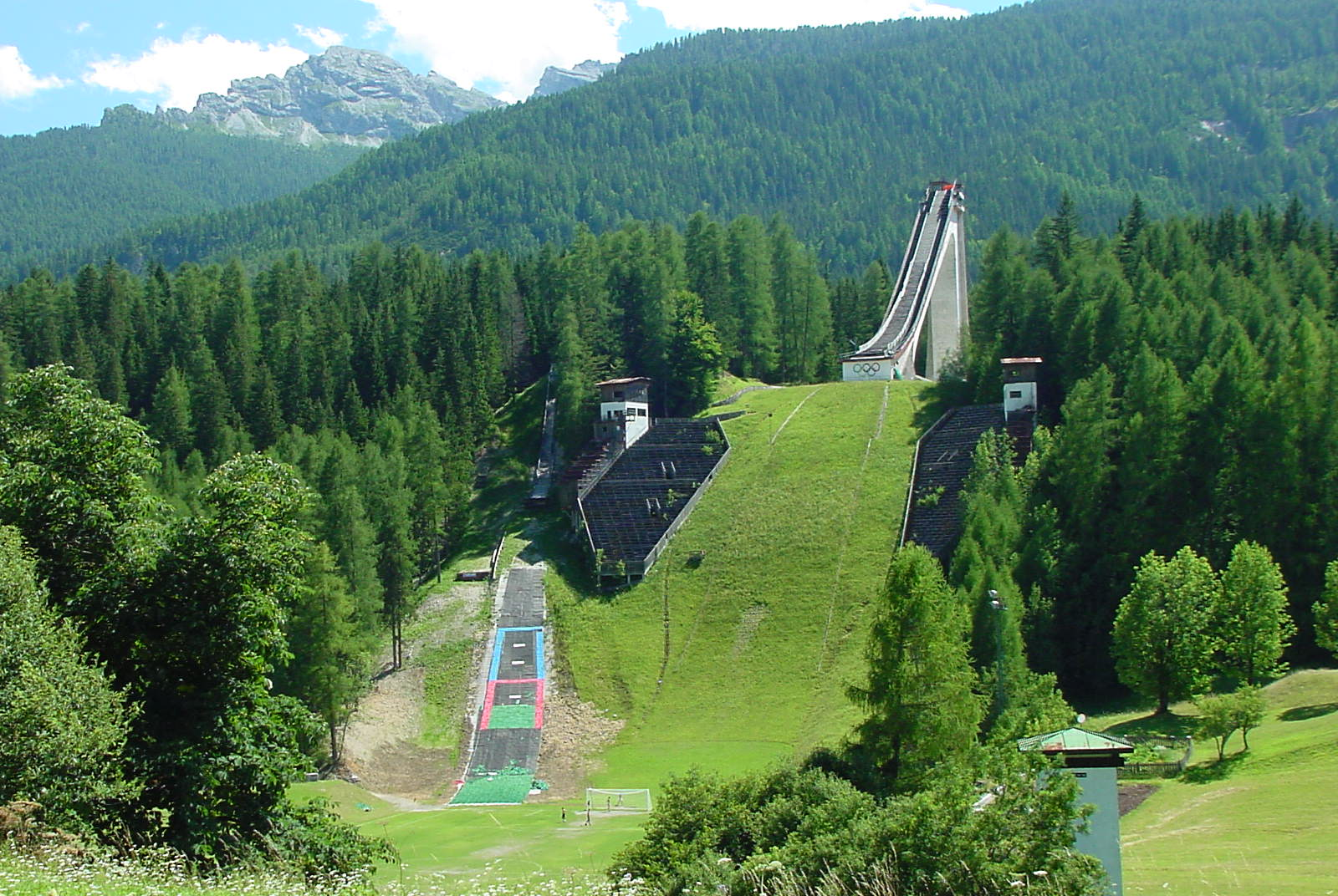
Trampolino Olimpico hosted the ski jumping portion of Nordic combined at the 1956 Winter Olympics in Cortina d’Ampezzo.

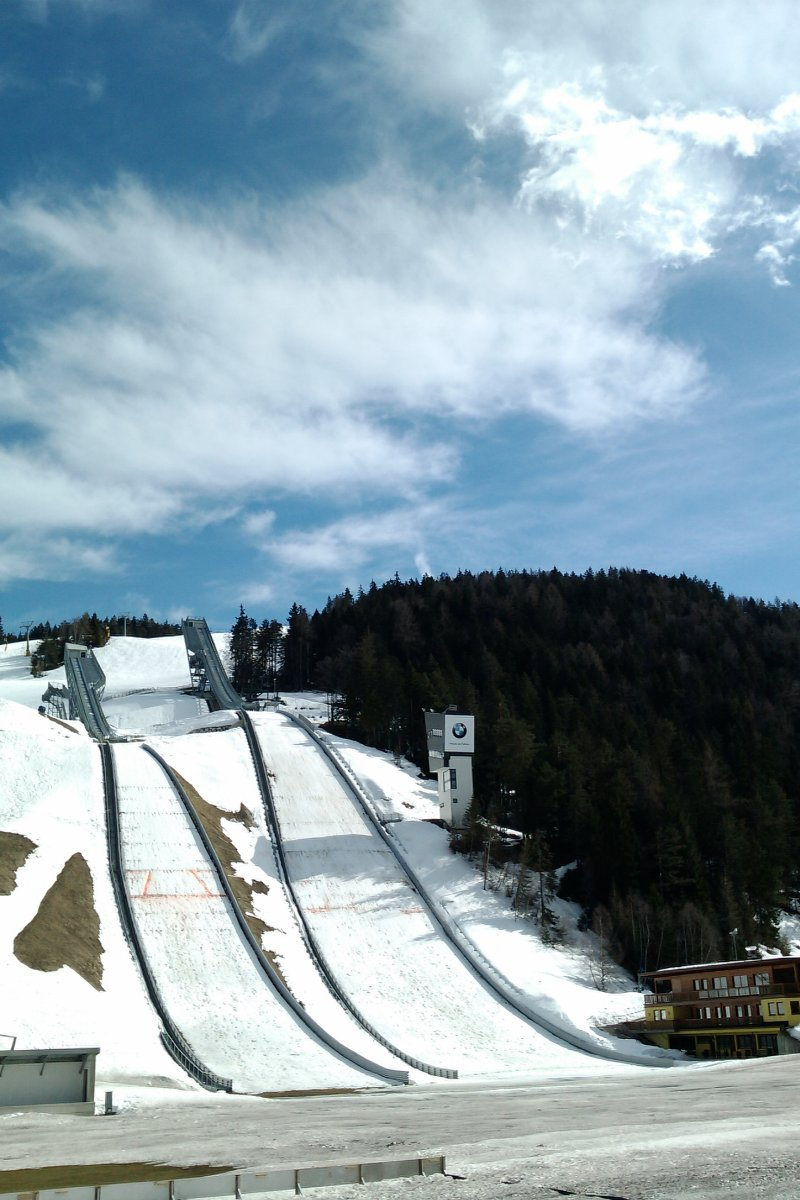
Seefeld in Tirol hosted Nordic combined at the 1964 and 1976 Winter Olympics in Innsbruck.

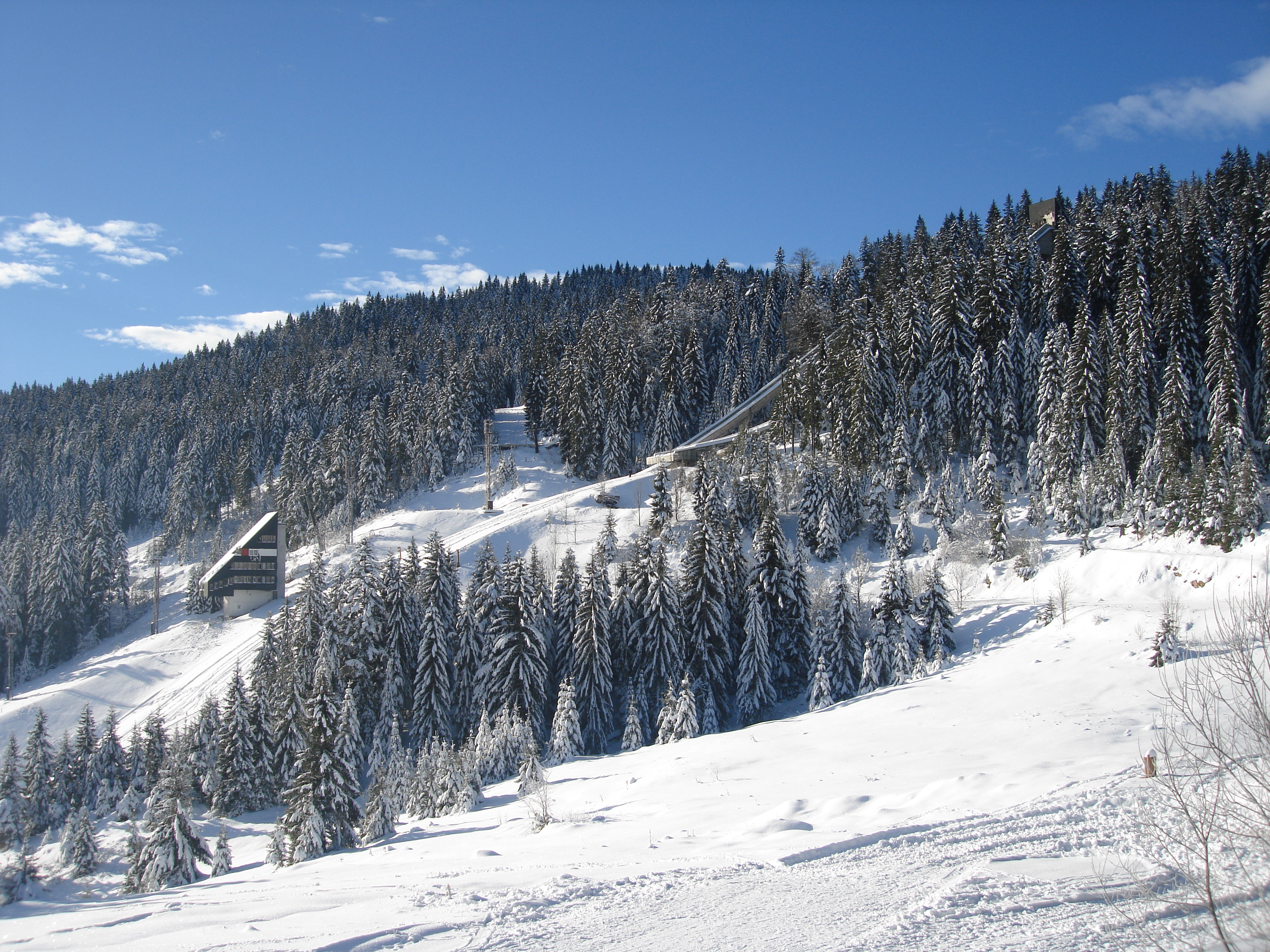
Igman hosted Nordic combined at the 1984 Winter Olympics in Sarajevo.

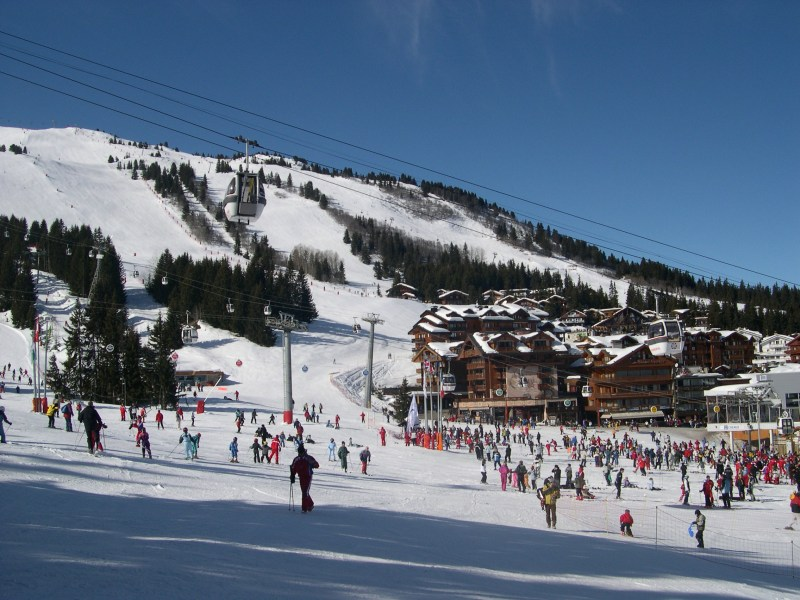
Courchevel hosted Nordic combined at the 1992 Winter Olympics in Albertville.

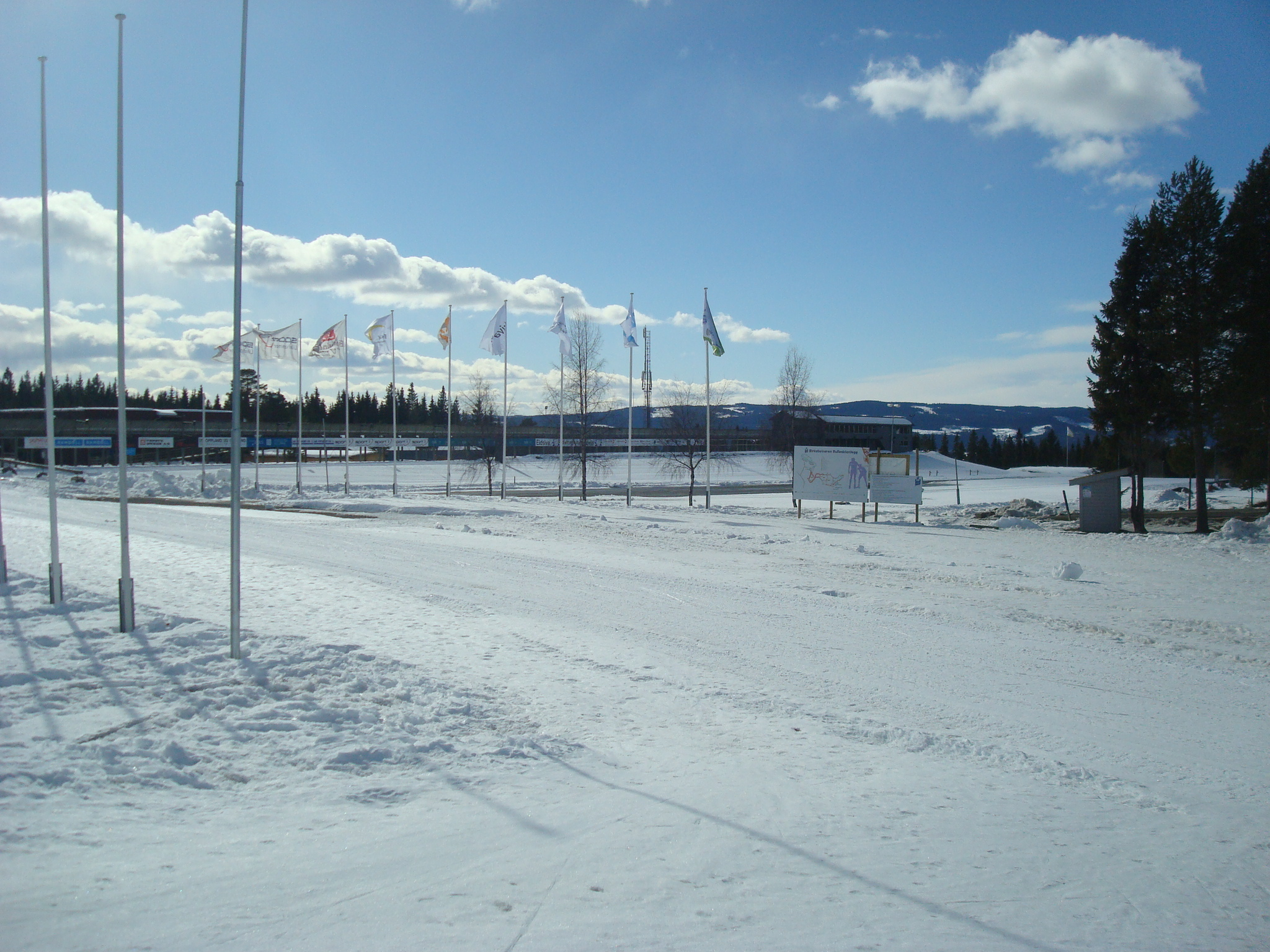
Birkebeineren Ski Stadium hosted the cross-country skiing portion of Nordic combined at the 1994 Winter Olympics in Lillehammer.

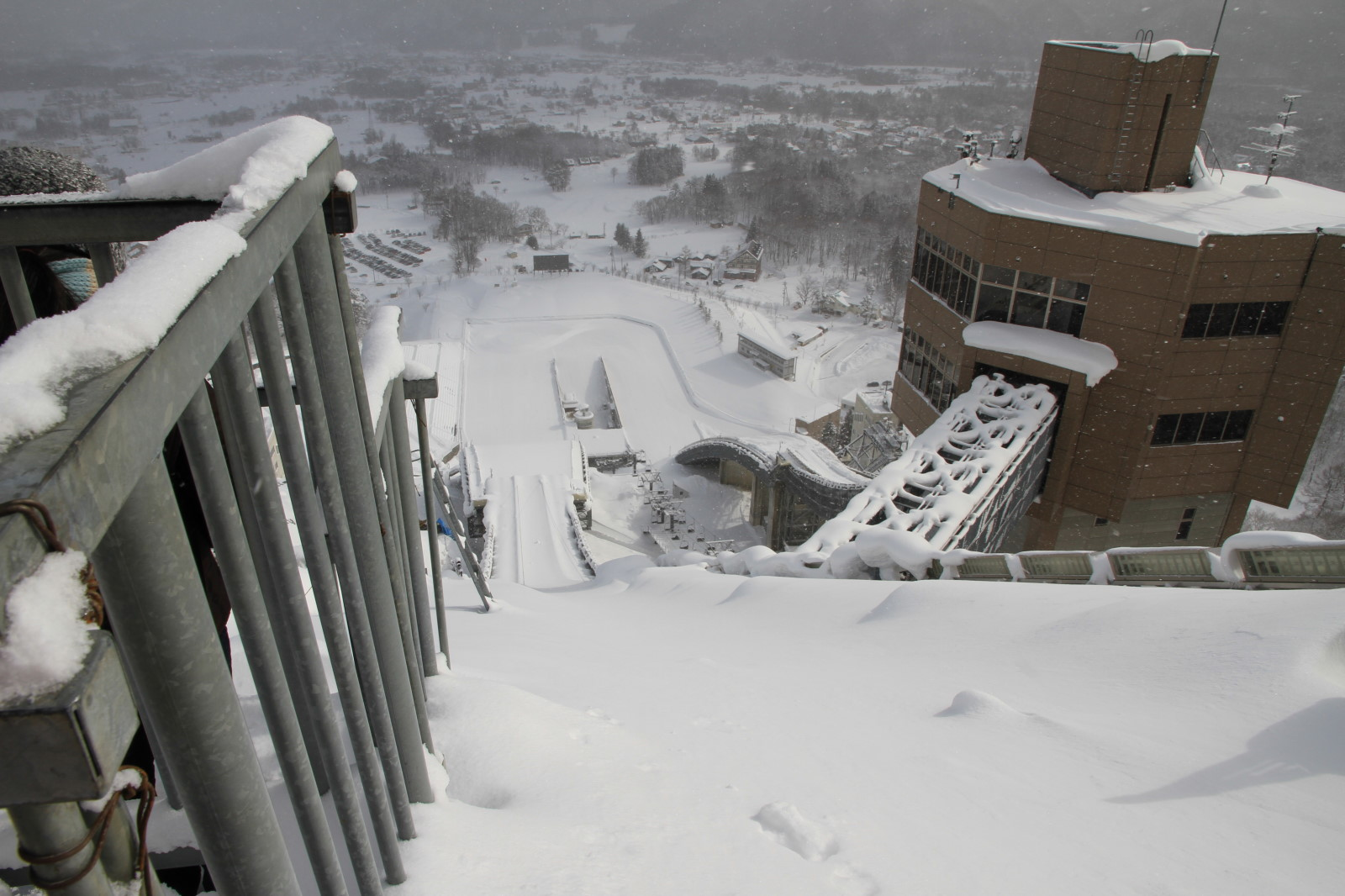
Hakuba Ski Jumping Stadium hosted the ski jumping portion of Nordic combined at the 1998 Winter Olympics in Nagano.

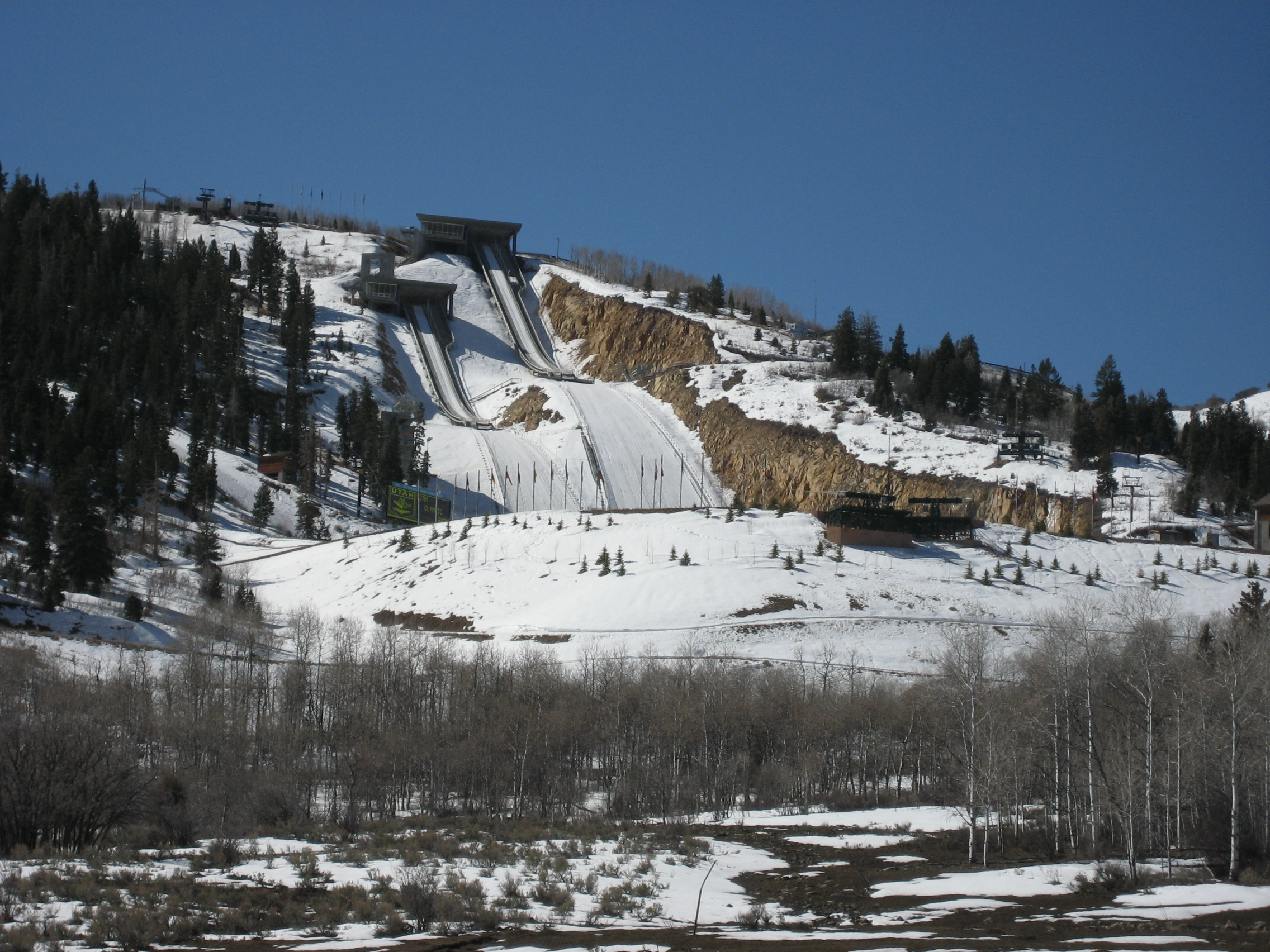
The Utah Olympic Park hosted the ski jumping portion of Nordic combined at the 2002 Winter Olympics in Salt Lake City.

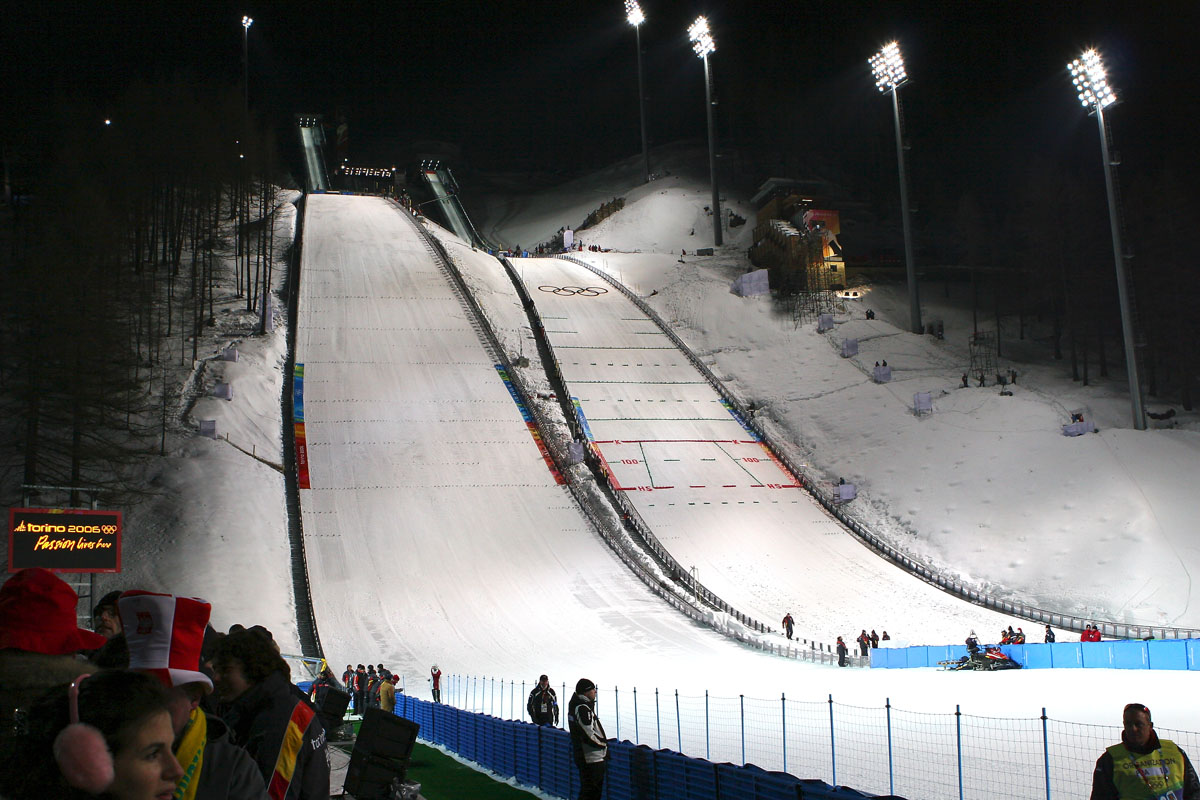
Stadio del Trampolino hosted the ski jumping portion of Nordic combined at the 2006 Winter Olympics in Turin.

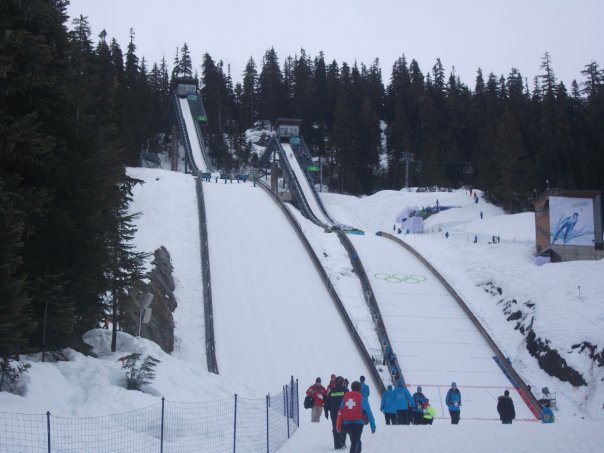
Whistler Olympic Park hosted Nordic combined at the 2010 Winter Olympics in Vancouver.

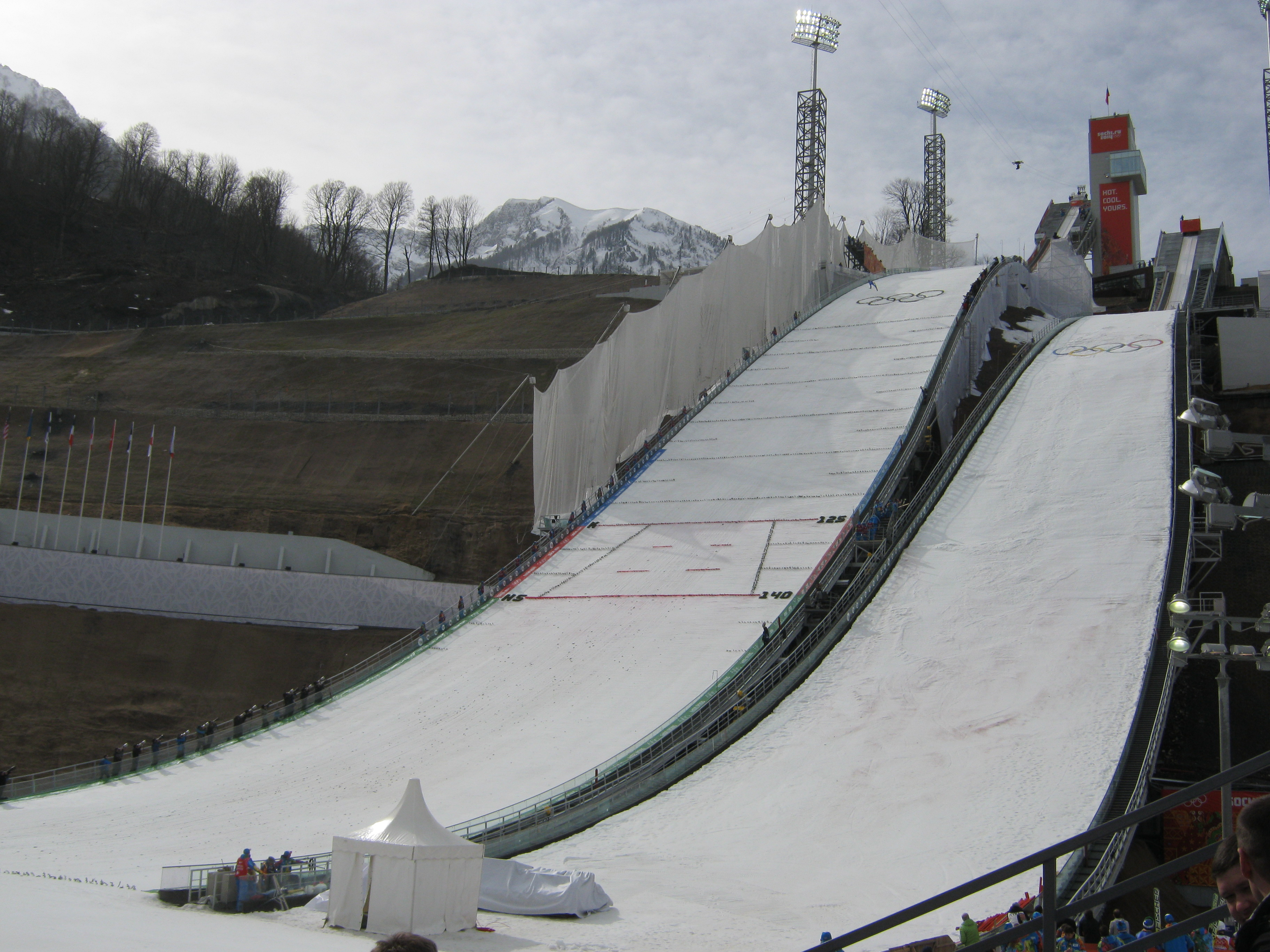
RusSki Gorki Jumping Center hosted the ski jumping portion of Nordic combined at the 2014 Winter Olympics in Sochi.

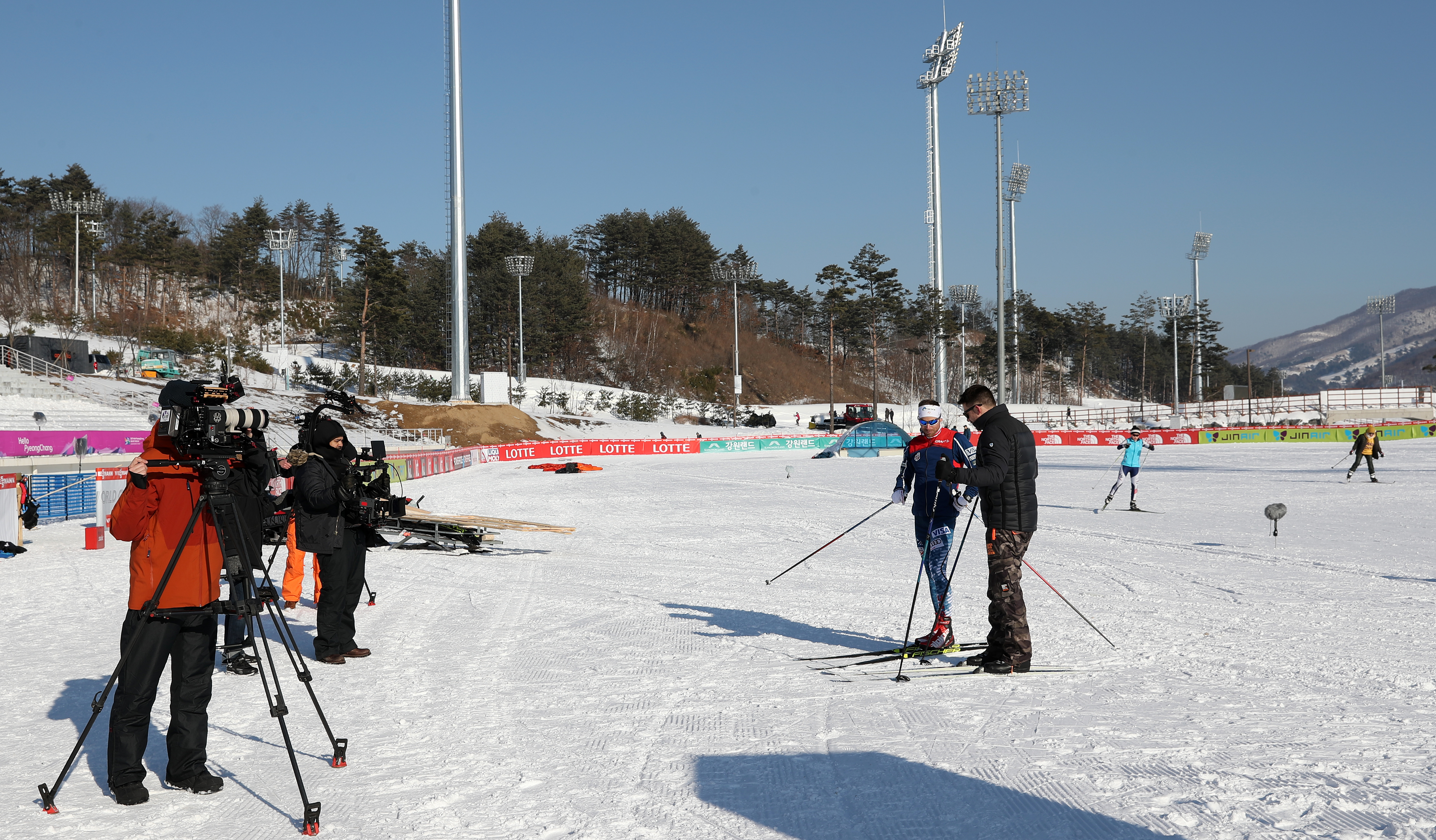
Alpensia Cross-Country Skiing Centre hosted the cross-country skiing portion of Nordic combined the 2018 Winter Olympics in Pyeongchang.

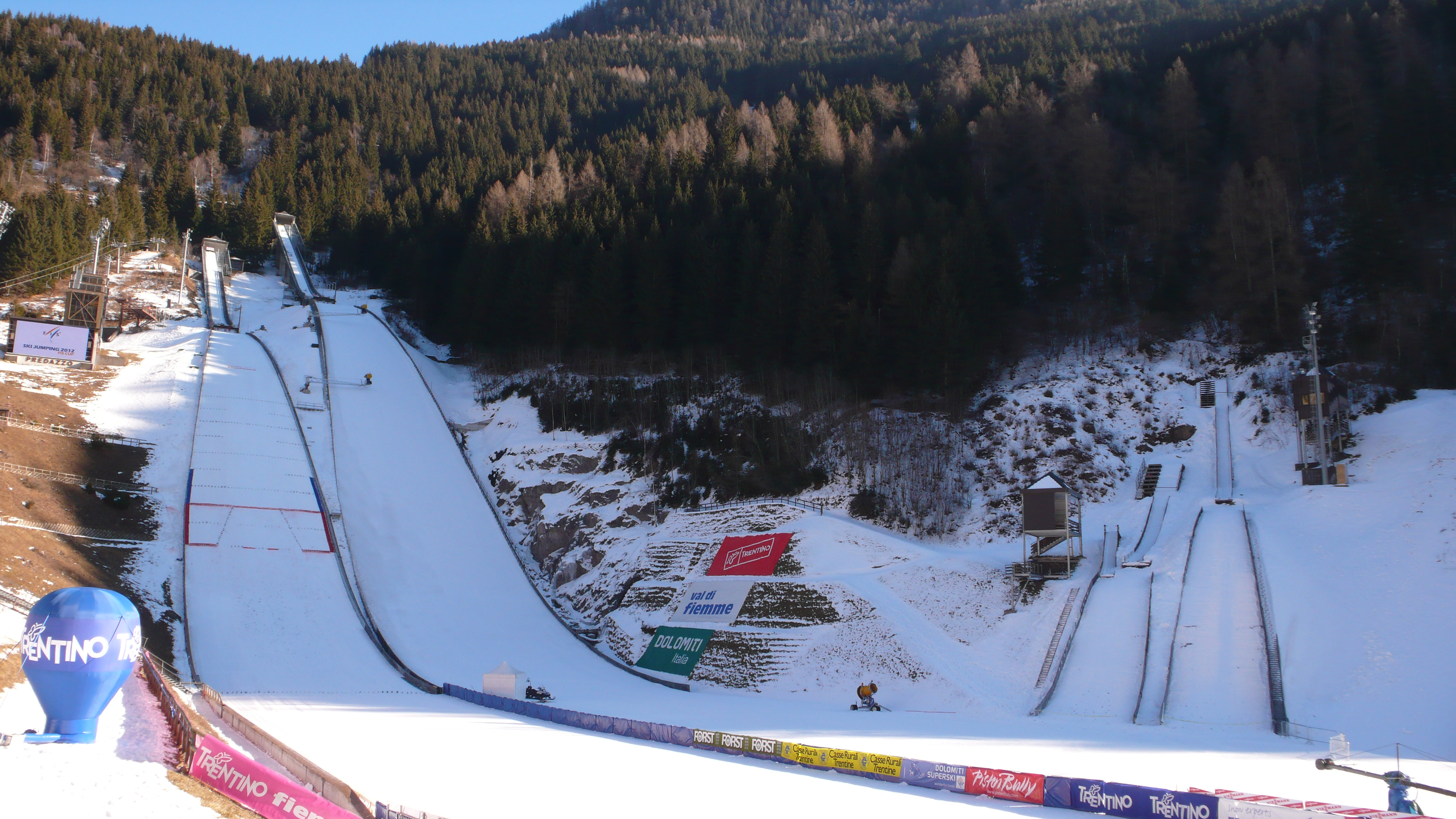
Giuseppe Dal Ben Ski Jumping Arena hosted the ski jumping portion of Nordic combined at the 2026 Winter Olympics in Milan and Cortina d’Ampezzo.
