= Hannelore Glaser =

Hannelore Glaser may refer to:

- Hannelore Glaser, the maiden name of Loki Schmidt
- Hannelore Glaser-Franke, a German former alpine skier
