= List of flag bearers for Italy at the Olympics =

Italy at the Olympics
- IOC code: ITA
- NOC: Italian National Olympic Committee
- Website: www.coni.it (in Italian)
- Medals Ranked 7th: Gold 281 Silver 250 Bronze 298 Total 829

Summer appearances
- 1896; 1900; 1904; 1908; 1912; 1920; 1924; 1928; 1932; 1936; 1948; 1952; 1956; 1960; 1964; 1968; 1972; 1976; 1980; 1984; 1988; 1992; 1996; 2000; 2004; 2008; 2012; 2016; 2020; 2024

Winter appearances
- 1924; 1928; 1932; 1936; 1948; 1952; 1956; 1960; 1964; 1968; 1972; 1976; 1980; 1984; 1988; 1992; 1994; 1998; 2002; 2006; 2010; 2014; 2018; 2022; 2026

Other related appearances
- 1906 Intercalated Games

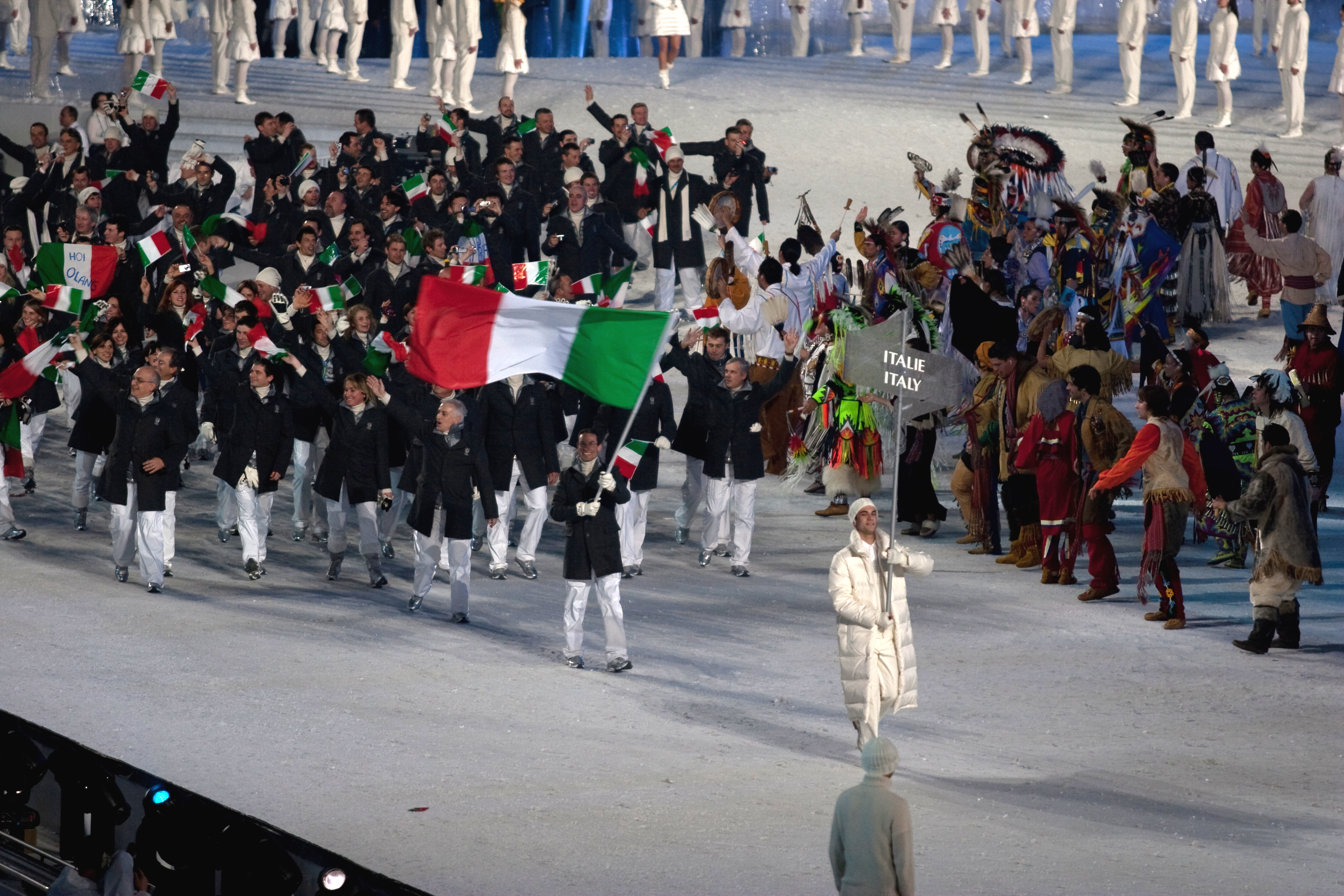
Giorgio Di Centa at Vancouver 2010

This is a list of flag bearers who have represented Italy at the Olympics.

Flag bearers carry the national flag of their country at the opening ceremony of the Olympic Games.

== Summer Olympics ==
#	Event year	Flag bearer	Sport
1	1908	Pietro Bragaglia	Gymnastics (Note: Did not compete.)
2	1912	Alberto Braglia	Gymnastics
3	1920	Nedo Nadi	Fencing
4	1924	Ugo Frigerio	Athletics
5	1928	Carlo Galimberti	Weightlifting
6	1932	Ugo Frigerio	Athletics
7	1936	Giulio Gaudini	Fencing
8	1948	Gianni Rocca	Athletics
9	1952	Miranda Cicognani	Gymnastics
10	1956	Edoardo Mangiarotti	Fencing
11	1960	Edoardo Mangiarotti	Fencing
12	1964	Giuseppe Delfino	Fencing
13	1968	Raimondo D'Inzeo	Equestrianism
14	1972	Abdon Pamich	Athletics
15	1976	Klaus Dibiasi	Diving
16	1984	Sara Simeoni	Athletics
17	1988	Pietro Mennea	Athletics
18	1992	Giuseppe Abbagnale	Rowing
19	1996	Giovanna Trillini	Fencing
20	2000	Carlton Myers	Basketball
21	2004	Jury Chechi	Gymnastics
22	2008	Antonio Rossi	Canoe racing
23	2012	Valentina Vezzali	Fencing
24	2016	Federica Pellegrini	Swimming
25	2020	Jessica Rossi	Shooting
25	2020	Elia Viviani	Cycling
26	2024	Arianna Errigo	Fencing
26	2024	Gianmarco Tamberi	Athletics

== Winter Olympics ==
#	Event year	Flag bearer	Sport
1	1924	Leonardo Bonzi	Bobsleigh
2	1928	Ferdinando Glück	Cross-country skiing
3	1932	Erminio Sertorelli	Alpine skiing
4	1936	Adriano Guarnieri	Alpine skiing
5	1948	Vittorio Chierroni	Alpine skiing
6	1952	Fides Romanin (Note: Sources differ. The now closed SR/Olympic Sports lists Maria Grazia Marchelli. The new site Olympedia lists Fides Romanin.)	Cross-country skiing
7	1956	Tito Tolin (Note: Sources differ. The now closed SR/Olympic Sports lists Nilo Zandanel. The new site Olympedia lists Tito Tolin.)	Ski jumping
8	1960	Bruno Alberti	Alpine skiing
9	1964	Eugenio Monti	Bobsleigh
10	1968	Clotilde Fasolis	Alpine skiing
11	1972	Luciano De Paolis	Bobsleigh
12	1976	Gustavo Thoeni	Alpine skiing
13	1980	Gustavo Thoeni	Alpine skiing
14	1984	Paul Hildgartner	Luge
15	1988	Paul Hildgartner	Luge
16	1992	Alberto Tomba	Alpine skiing
17	1994	Deborah Compagnoni	Alpine skiing
18	1998	Gerda Weissensteiner	Luge
19	2002	Isolde Kostner	Alpine skiing
20	2006	Carolina Kostner	Figure skating
21	2010	Giorgio Di Centa	Cross-country skiing
22	2014	Armin Zoeggeler	Luge
23	2018	Arianna Fontana	Short track speed skating
24	2022	Michela Moioli	Snowboarding
25	2026	Arianna Fontana	Short track speed skating
25	2026	Federico Pellegrino	Cross-country skiing
25	2026	Federica Brignone	Alpine skiing
25	2026	Amos Mosaner	Curling

== See also ==
- Italy at the Olympics
