= Charles Tremblay =

American Nordic combined skier

Personal information
- Nationality: American
- Born: August 15, 1930 Lebanon, New Hampshire, United States
- Died: May 1, 2002 (aged 71)

Sport
- Sport: Nordic combined

Charles Tremblay (August 15, 1930 – May 1, 2002) was an American skier. He competed in the Nordic combined event at the 1956 Winter Olympics.
