= Arthur Olsson =

Swedish cross-country skier

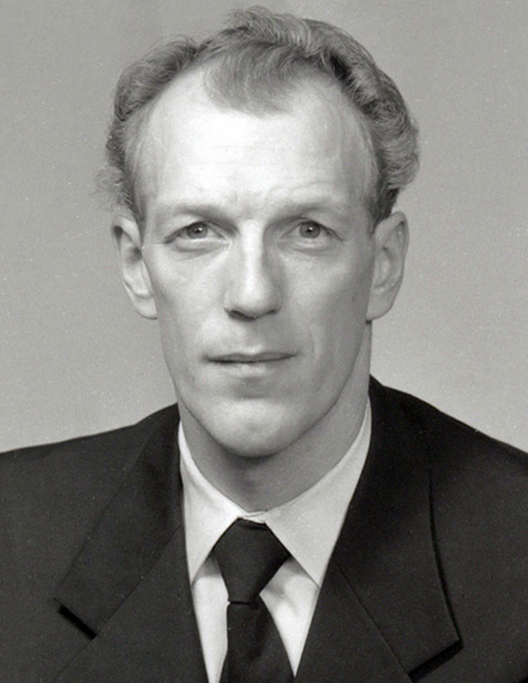

Personal information
- Born: 7 February 1926 Nyskoga, Torsby, Sweden
- Died: 12 October 2013 (aged 87) Råda, Sweden

Sport
- Sport: Cross-country skiing
- Club: IFK Likenäs; Lesjöfors SK
Medal record
Men's cross-country skiing
Representing Sweden
World Championships
Bronze medal – third place	1954 Falun	4 × 10 km relay

Arthur Eidor Folke "Likenäsarn" Olsson (7 February 1926 – 12 October 2013) was a Swedish cross-country skier. He finished 11th in the 50 km event at the 1956 Winter Olympics and won a bronze medal in the 4 × 10 km relay at the 1954 World Championships. He received his nickname Likenäsarn after his first club IFK Likenäs.

== Cross-country skiing results ==
=== Olympic Games ===
Year	Age	15 km	30 km	50 km	4 × 10 km relay
1956	30	—	—	11	—

=== World Championships ===
- 1 medal – (1 bronze)

Year	Age	15 km	30 km	50 km	4 × 10 km relay
1954	28	—	—	—	Bronze
