= Esko Jussila =

Finnish Nordic combined skier

Personal information
- Nationality: Finnish
- Born: 22 April 1934 (age 90); Hollola, Finland

Sport
- Sport: Nordic combined

Esko Jussila (born 22 April 1934) is a Finnish skier. He competed in the Nordic combined event at the 1956 Winter Olympics.
