= Franciszek Gąsienica Groń =

Polish skier

Medal record

Men's Nordic combined

Representing Poland

Olympic Games
Bronze medal – third place	1956 Cortina	Individual

Franciszek Gąsienica Groń (30 September 1931 – 31 July 2014) was a Polish Nordic combined athlete who competed in the 1950s. He won a bronze medal in the Nordic combined at the 1956 Winter Olympics in Cortina d'Ampezzo. He was the first Polish athlete to win a Winter Olympics medal in any Nordic skiing discipline (cross-country skiing, ski jumping, and Nordic combined).

He was born in Zakopane.
