= Leonardo Bragaglia =

Italian actor, director, and essayist (c. 1932–2020)

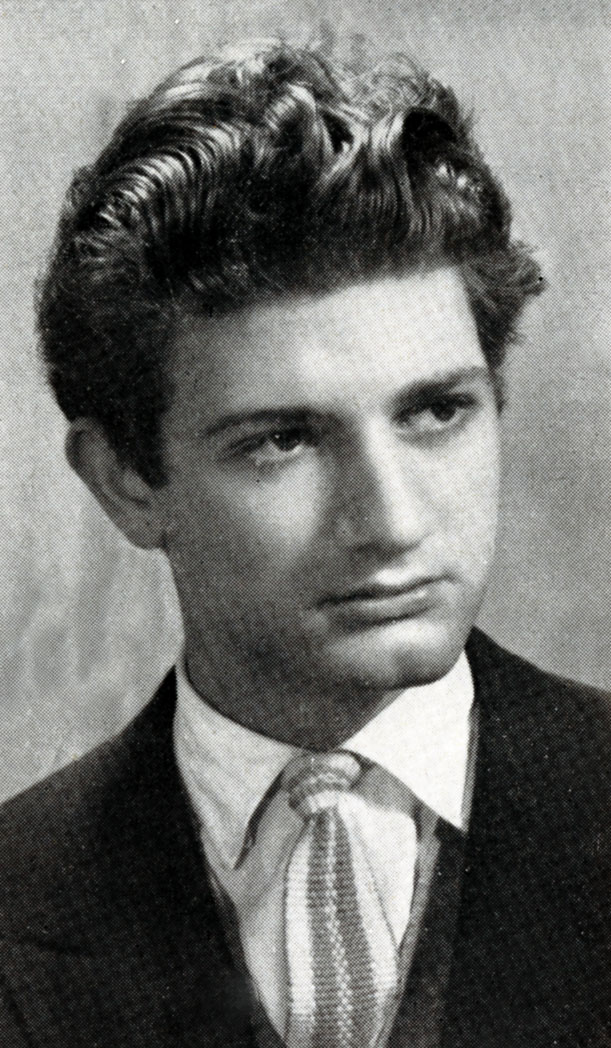
- Born: c. 1932
- Died: August 1, 2020; Anzio, Italy
- Occupations: Actor, director, essayist
- Spouse: Alberto Bragaglia
- Relatives: Anton Giulio Bragaglia (uncle); Carlo Ludovico Ragghianti (uncle)

Leonardo Bragaglia (c. 1932 – August 1, 2020) was an Italian actor, director and essayist.
