= Christian Wenger =

Swiss cross-country skier

Personal information
- Nationality: Swiss
- Born: 12 January 1925

Sport
- Sport: Cross-country skiing

Christian Wenger (born 12 January 1925) was a Swiss cross-country skier. He competed in the men's 50 kilometre event at the 1956 Winter Olympics.
