= Vítězslav Lahr =

Czech Nordic combined skier

Personal information
- Nationality: Czech
- Born: 15 July 1929

Sport
- Sport: Nordic combined

Vítězslav Lahr (born 15 July 1929) was a Czech skier. He competed in the Nordic combined event at the 1956 Winter Olympics.
