= Inge Limberg =

Swedish cross-country skier

Personal information
- Nationality: Swedish
- Born: 17 December 1922 Dalarna, Sweden
- Died: 22 May 1989 (aged 66) Dalarna, Sweden

Sport
- Sport: Cross-country skiing

Inge Limberg (17 December 1922 – 22 May 1989) was a Swedish cross-country skier. He competed in the 50 km event at the 1956 Winter Olympics.

== Cross-country skiing results ==
=== Olympic Games ===
Year	Age	15 km	30 km	50 km	4 × 10 km relay
1956	33	—	—	12	—
