= Ildegarda Taffra =

Italian cross-country skier (1934–2020)

Ildegarda Taffra (30 June 1934 – 7 December 2020) was an Italian cross-country skier who competed in the 1950s.

== Life ==
She was born in Tarvisio.

Competing in two Winter Olympics, she finished eighth in the 3 × 5 km relay at Cortina d'Ampezzo in 1956. Taffra also competed in the 10 km event at the 1952 Winter Olympics in Oslo, but did not finish. Taffra was a six-time national champion and also earned five podium finishes in her career, including four victories. Like her compatriot Fides Romanin, she would be an inspiration to future women cross country skiers for Italy, including Manuela Di Centa, Stefania Belmondo, and Gabriella Paruzzi.

Taffra died from COVID-19 in Trieste on 7 December 2020, at age 86, during the COVID-19 pandemic in Italy.

== Cross-country skiing results ==
=== Olympic Games ===
Year	Age	10 km	3 × 5 km relay
1952	17	DNF	—N/a
1956	21	23	8

=== World Championships ===
Year	Age	10 km	3 × 5 km relay
1954	19	—	8
