= Jan Raszka =

Polish Nordic combined skier

Personal information
- Nationality: Polish
- Born: 2 December 1928; Wisła, Poland
- Died: 5 February 2007 (aged 78); Wisła, Poland

Sport
- Sport: Nordic combined

Jan Raszka (2 December 1928 – 5 February 2007) was a Polish skier. He competed in the Nordic combined event at the 1956 Winter Olympics.
