= Fritz Zurbuchen =

Swiss cross-country skier (1924–1983)

Personal information
- Nationality: Swiss
- Born: 20 December 1924
- Died: 6 October 1983 (aged 58) Bern, Switzerland

Sport
- Sport: Cross-country skiing

Fritz Zurbuchen (20 December 1924 – 6 October 1983) was a Swiss cross-country skier. He competed in the men's 50 kilometre event at the 1956 Winter Olympics. Zurbuchen died in Bern on 6 October 1983, at the age of 58.
