= Josef Nüsser =

Czech Nordic combined skier (1931–2023)

Personal information
- Nationality: Czech
- Born: 13 July 1931; Harrachov, Czechoslovakia
- Died: 18 October 2023 (aged 92); Harrachov, Czech Republic

Sport
- Sport: Nordic combined

Josef Nüsser (13 July 1931 – 18 October 2023) was a Czech skier. He competed in the Nordic combined event at the 1956 Winter Olympics. Nüsser died on 18 October 2023, at the age of 92.
