= Viktor Dmitryevich Baranov =

Soviet cross-country skier

Viktor Baranov
Personal information
- Nationality: Soviet
- Born: 30 January 1928
- Died: 14 August 2005 (aged 77)

Sport
- Sport: Cross-country skiing

Viktor Dmitriyevich Baranov (30 January 1928 – 14 August 2005) was a Soviet cross-country skier. He competed in the men's 50 kilometre event at the 1956 Winter Olympics.
