= Alberto Braglia =

Italian artistic gymnast

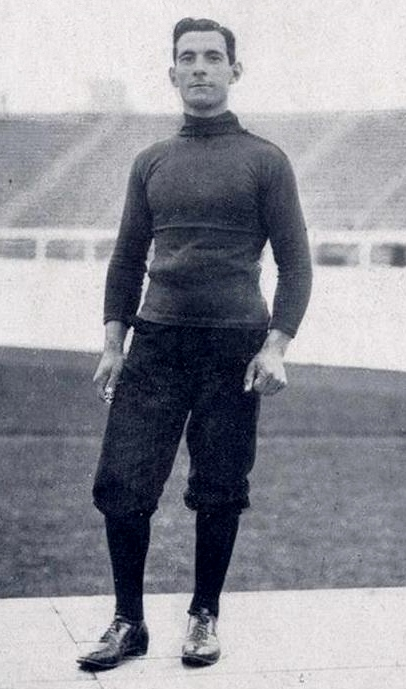

Personal information
- Born: 23 April 1883 Campogalliano (Modena)
- Died: 5 February 1954 (aged 70) Modena, Italy

Gymnastics career
- Discipline: Men's artistic gymnastics
- Country represented: Italy
- Club: Società del Panaro Modena Baseball
Medal record
Representing Italy
Olympic Games
Gold medal – first place	1908 London	All-Around
Gold medal – first place	1912 Stockholm	All-Around
Gold medal – first place	1912 Stockholm	Team
Intercalated Games
Silver medal – second place	1906 Athens	All-around 5 events
Silver medal – second place	1906 Athens	All-around 6 events
World Championships
Bronze medal – third place	1909 Luxembourg	Team

Alberto Braglia (23 April 1883 – 5 February 1954) was an Italian gymnast who won three gold medals at the 1908 and 1912 Olympics.

== Biography ==
Braglia started practicing gymnastics in club at age 12. After winning the gold medal in the all-around at the 1908 Olympics, he suffered a serious shoulder injury while performing in public and fell in a depression due to the death of his 4-year-old son. He recovered by the 1912 Games, where he served as the flag bearer for Italy and won two more gold medals, after which he retired from competitions to perform as an acrobat in circuses. Braglia returned to the 1932 Olympic Games as the coach of the Italian gymnastics team.

Braglia died in a Modena medical clinic on 5 February 1954 after suffering a cardiac arrest.

Braglia, all the way on the right, with his bronze-medal-winning Italian team at the 1909 World Artistic Gymnastics Championships in Luxembourg

== See also ==
- Legends of Italian sport - Walk of Fame

Summer Olympics
Preceded by Pietro Bragaglia	Flag bearer for Italy; 1912 Stockholm	Succeeded by Nedo Nadi
