= Edvin Landsem =

Norwegian cross-country skier (1925–2004)

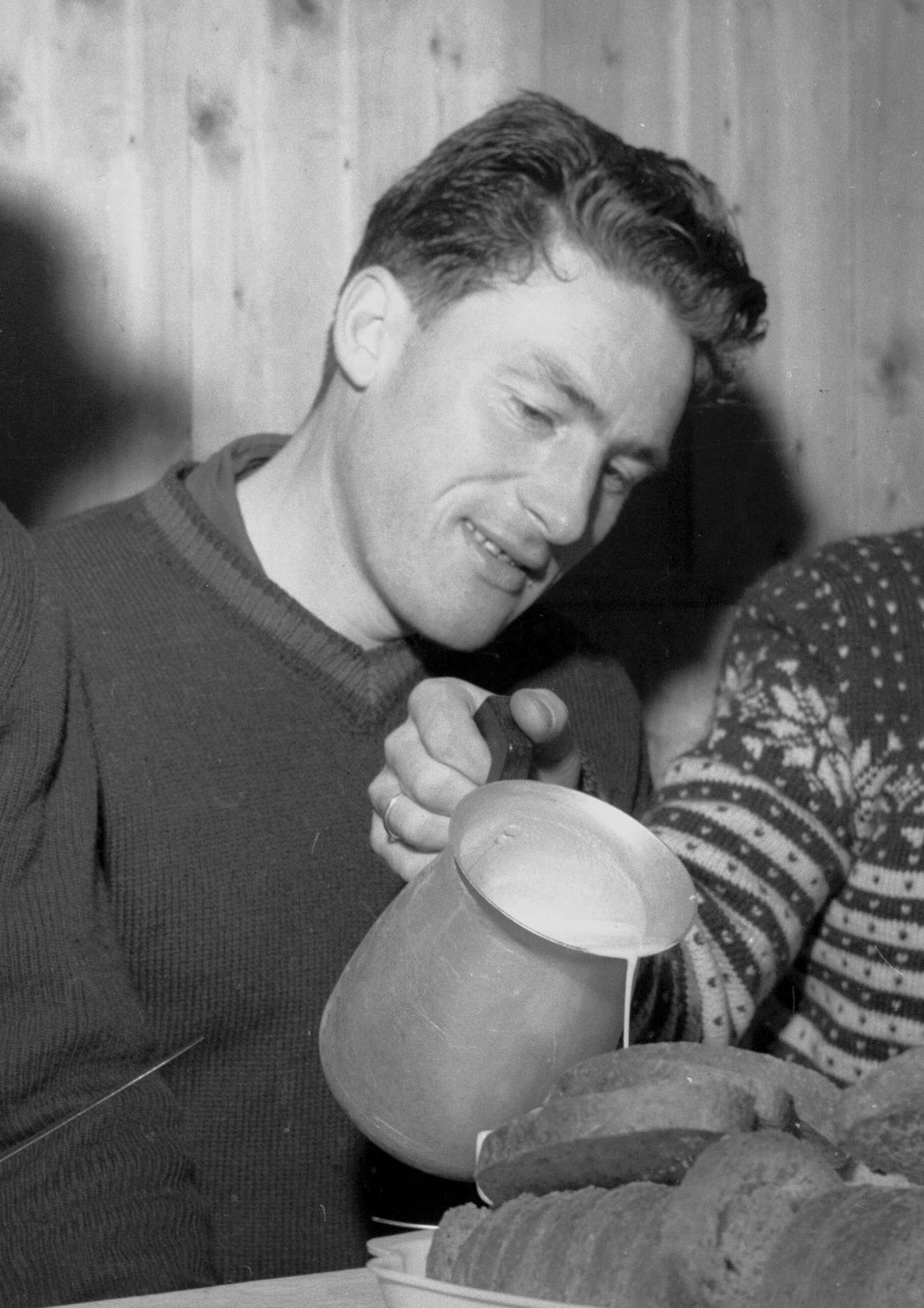
- Landsem in 1955

Personal information
- Born: 27 February 1925 Rindal Municipality, Norway
- Died: 31 August 2004 (aged 79) Rindal Municipality, Norway

Sport
- Sport: Cross-country skiing
- Club: Idrettslaget Troll, Rindal

Edvin Landsem (27 February 1925 – 31 August 2004) was a Norwegian cross-country skier. Competing in the 50 km event he finished seventh at the 1952 Winter Olympics, fifth at the 1954 FIS Nordic World Ski Championships and 15th at the 1956 Winter Olympics.

== Cross-country skiing results ==
All results are sourced from the International Ski Federation (FIS).

=== Olympic Games ===
Year	Age	15 km	18 km	30 km	50 km	4 × 10 km relay
1952	26	—N/a	—	—N/a	7	—
1956	30	—	—N/a	—	15	—

=== World Championships ===
Year	Age	15 km	18 km	30 km	50 km	4 × 10 km relay
1950	24	—N/a	22	—N/a	12	—
1954	28	26	—N/a	17	5	—
