= Richard Aylmer =

British cross-country skier (1932–2023)

Personal information
- Nationality: British
- Born: 11 January 1932 Devonport, Plymouth, England
- Died: 5 March 2023 (aged 91) Ross-on-Wye, Herefordshire, England

Sport
- Sport: Cross-country skiing

Richard Grenfell Aylmer (11 January 1932 – 5 March 2023) was a British cross-country skier. He competed in the men's 50 kilometre event at the 1956 Winter Olympics.

Aylmer died on 5 March 2023, at the age of 91.
