= Alberto Bragaglia =

Italian painter (1896–1985)

- Born: January 26, 1896
- Died: April 30, 1985 (aged 89)
- Occupation: Painter
- Movement: Futurism
- Children: Leonardo Bragaglia
- Family: Carlo Ludovico Ragghianti (brother)

Alberto Bragaglia (January 26, 1896 – April 30, 1985) was an Italian Futurist painter. His son Leonardo was an actor and director, and his brother Carlo was a politician.
