= Hermann Möchel =

German cross-country skier (1925–2007)

Personal information
- Nationality: German
- Born: 5 January 1925; Rochlitz, Germany
- Died: 17 February 2007 (aged 82); Kiefersfelden, Germany

Sport
- Sport: Cross-country skiing

Hermann Möchel (5 January 1925 – 17 February 2007) was a German cross-country skier. He competed in the men's 30 kilometre event at the 1956 Winter Olympics.
