= Herbert Leonhardt =

German Nordic combined skier

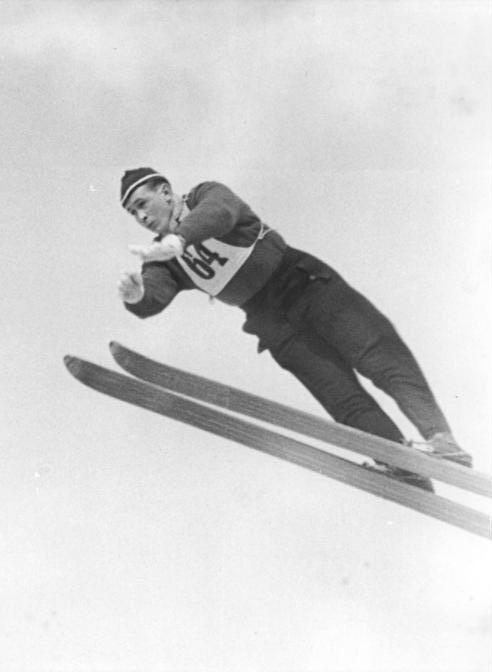
- Herbert Leonhardt in 1954

Personal information
- Nationality: German
- Born: 27 January 1925
- Died: 6 July 1986 (aged 61)

Sport
- Sport: Nordic combined

Herbert Leonhardt (27 January 1925 – 6 July 1986) was a German skier. He competed in the Nordic combined event at the 1956 Winter Olympics.
