= Remo Tomasi =

Italian speed skater

Personal information
- Nationality: Italian
- Born: 20 May 1932 Bolzano, Italy
- Died: 28 September 2013 (aged 81) Bolzano, Italy

Sport
- Sport: Speed skating

Remo Tomasi (20 May 1932 – 28 September 2013) was an Italian speed skater. He competed in two events at the 1956 Winter Olympics.
