= Pietro Bragaglia =

Italian artistic gymnast (1890–1956)

- Born: 16 November 1890 Ferrara, Kingdom of Italy
- Died: 29 January 1956 (aged 65) Cagliari, Italy

Gymnastics career
- Discipline: Men's artistic gymnastics
- Gym: Palestra Ginnastica Ferrara

Pietro Bragaglia (16 November 1890 – 29 January 1956) was an Italian gymnast, best known to be the first Italian flag bearer at the Summer Olympics.

== Biography ==
Bragaglia was the first Italian flag bearer in the history of the Olympic Games, 18 years old at the 1908 Summer Olympics in London, but did not participate in the competitions.

== See also ==
- List of flag bearers for Italy at the Olympics

Summer Olympics
Preceded by -	Flag bearer for Italy; 1908 London	Succeeded by Alberto Braglia
