= Else Amann =

German skier (1923–2018)

Else Ammann
Personal information
- Nationality: German
- Born: 17 May 1923 Unterjoch, Bavaria, Germany
- Died: 23 January 2018 Künzelsau, Baden-Württemberg, Germany

Sport
- Sport: Cross-country skiing

Else Ammann (17 May 1923 – 23 January 2018) was a German cross-country skier. She competed in the women's 10 kilometres and the women's 3 × 5 kilometre relay events at the 1956 Winter Olympics.

== Cross-country skiing results ==
=== Olympic Games ===
Year	Age	10 km	3 × 5 km relay
1956	32	20	7
