= Gianni Carrara =

Italian cross-country skier

Personal information
- Nationality: Italian
- Born: 8 February 1929; Serina, Italy
- Died: 11 March 1992 (aged 63)

Sport
- Sport: Cross-country skiing

Gianni Carrara (8 February 1929 – 11 March 1992) was an Italian cross-country skier. He competed in the men's 50 kilometre event at the 1956 Winter Olympics.
