= Sepp Behr =

German alpine skier (1930–2023)

Sepp Behr (20 February 1930 – 11 July 2023) was a German alpine skier who competed in the 1956 Winter Olympics.

Behr was born on 20 February 1930, and died on 11 July 2023, at the age of 93.
