= Anna Pellissier =

Italian alpine skier (1927–2017)

Personal information
- Nationality: Italian
- Born: 24 March 1927; Breuil-Cervinia, Italy
- Died: 14 June 2017 (aged 90)

Sport
- Sport: Alpine skiing

Anna Pellissier (pronounced [anna pɛlisje]; 24 March 1927 – 14 June 2017) was an Italian alpine skier. She competed in three events at the 1956 Winter Olympics.
