= Aldo Pedrana =

Italian Nordic combined skier

Personal information
- Nationality: Italian
- Born: 11 April 1934 Bormio, Italy
- Died: 16 October 2018 (aged 84)

Sport
- Sport: Nordic combined

Aldo Pedrana (11 April 1934 – 16 October 2018) was an Italian skier. He competed in the Nordic combined event at the 1956 Winter Olympics.
