= Gioacchino Busin =

Italian cross-country skier (1930–2008)

Personal information
- Nationality: Italian
- Born: 20 May 1930; Falcade, Italy
- Died: 28 April 2008 (aged 77); Canale d'Agordo, Italy

Sport
- Sport: Cross-country skiing

Gioacchino Busin (20 May 1930 – 28 April 2008) was an Italian cross-country skier. He competed in the men's 50 kilometre event at the 1956 Winter Olympics.
