= Karl Zillibiller =

German alpine skier (born 1933)

Karl Zillibiller (born 3 September 1933) is a German former alpine skier who competed in the 1956 Winter Olympics.

Zillibiller was born in Bad Hindelang.
