= Vigilio Mich =

Italian cross-country skier (1931–2019)

Personal information
- Nationality: Italian
- Born: 5 March 1931; Tesero, Kingdom of Italy
- Died: 3 August 2019 (aged 88); Predazzo, Italy

Sport
- Sport: Cross-country skiing

Vigilio Mich (5 March 1931 – 3 August 2019) was an Italian cross-country skier. He competed in the men's 50 kilometre event at the 1956 Winter Olympics.
