= Battista Mismetti =

Italian cross-country skier

Personal information
- Nationality: Italian
- Born: 31 October 1925; Santa Brigida, Italy
- Died: 29 March 2017 (aged 91)

Sport
- Sport: Cross-country skiing

Battista Mismetti (31 October 1925 – 29 March 2017) was an Italian cross-country skier. He competed in the men's 50 kilometre event at the 1956 Winter Olympics.
