= Hans Keller (speed skater) =

German speed skater

Personal information
- Nationality: German
- Born: 1 September 1931; Munich, Germany

Sport
- Sport: Speed skating

Hans Keller (born 1 September 1931) is a German speed skater. He competed in three events at the 1956 Winter Olympics.
