= Gerhard Glaß =

German Nordic combined skier

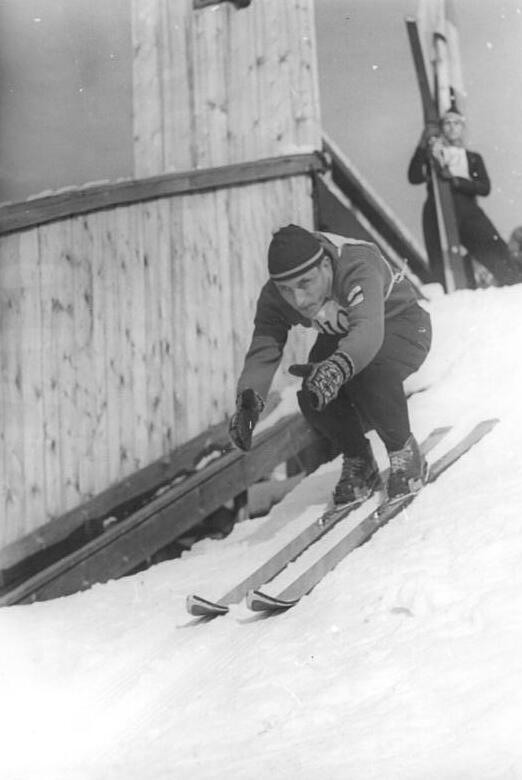

Personal information
- Nationality: German
- Born: 17 July 1927; Klingenthal, Germany
- Died: 14 July 2010 (aged 82); Schöneck, Germany

Sport
- Sport: Nordic combined

Gerhard Glaß (17 July 1927 – 14 July 2010) was a German skier. He competed in the Nordic combined event at the 1956 Winter Olympics.
