= Tito Tolin =

Italian ski jumper

Personal information
- Nationality: Italian
- Born: 28 October 1935 Asiago, Italy
- Died: 6 March 2006 (aged 70) Asiago, Italy

Sport
- Sport: Ski jumping

Tito Tolin (28 October 1935 – 6 March 2006) was an Italian ski jumper. He competed in the individual event at the 1956 Winter Olympics. Tolin was the flag bearer for Italy in the opening ceremony of the 1956 Winter Games.

Winter Olympics
Preceded by Fides Romanin	Flag bearer for Italy; Cortina 1956	Succeeded by Bruno Alberti
