= Federico Deflorian =

Italian cross-country skier

Federico Deflorian (9 June 1921 – 15 June 2003) was an Italian cross-country skier who competed in the 1950s. He finished 19th in the 18 km event at the 1952 Winter Olympics in Oslo.

Further notable results were:

- 1949: 1st, Italian men's championships of cross-country skiing, 18 km
- 1951: 3rd, Italian men's championships of cross-country skiing, 18 km
- 1952: 1st, Italian men's championships of cross-country skiing, 18 km
- 1953:
  - 1st, Italian men's championships of cross-country skiing, 30 km
  - 1st, Italian men's championships of cross-country skiing, 15 km
- 1954:
  - 1st, Italian men's championships of cross-country skiing, 50 km
  - 2nd, Italian men's championships of cross-country skiing, 30 km
- 1955:
  - 1st, Italian men's championships of cross-country skiing, 50 km
  - 1st, Italian men's championships of cross-country skiing, 30 km
  - 1st, Italian men's championships of cross-country skiing, 15 km
- 1956:
  - 1st, Italian men's championships of cross-country skiing, 50 km
  - 1st, Italian men's championships of cross-country skiing, 15 km
  - 3rd, Italian men's championships of cross-country skiing, 30 km
- 1957:
  - 1st, Italian men's championships of cross-country skiing, 50 km
  - 2nd, Italian men's championships of cross-country skiing, 30 km
  - 2nd, Italian men's championships of cross-country skiing, 15 km
- 1958: 2nd, Italian men's championships of cross-country skiing, 30 km
- 1959:
  - 1st, Italian men's championships of cross-country skiing, 50 km
  - 1st, Italian men's championships of cross-country skiing, 30 km
