= Carlo Calzà =

Italian speed skater

Personal information
- Nationality: Italian
- Born: 7 June 1931 (age 95) Cortina d'Ampezzo, Italy

Sport
- Sport: Speed skating

Carlo Calzà (born 7 June 1931) is an Italian speed skater. He competed in two events at the 1956 Winter Olympics.
