= Gino Burrini =

Italian alpine skier (1934–2022)

Personal information
- Born: 12 May 1934 Madonna di Campiglio, Italy
- Died: 20 April 2022 (aged 87) Tione, Italy

Skiing career
- Sport: Alpine skiing

Gino Burrini (12 May 1934 – 20 April 2022) was an Italian alpine skier. He competed in two events at the 1956 Winter Olympics.
