= Bruno Burrini =

Italian alpine skier (1931–2017)

Personal information
- Born: 22 November 1931 Madonna di Campiglio, Italy
- Died: 4 April 2017 (aged 85)

Skiing career
- Sport: Alpine skiing

Bruno Burrini (22 November 1931 – 4 April 2017) was an Italian alpine skier. He competed in three events at the 1956 Winter Olympics.
