= Enzo Perin =

Italian ski jumper (born 1933)

Personal information
- Nationality: Italian
- Born: 10 August 1933 (age 92) Brennero, Italy

Sport
- Sport: Ski jumping

Enzo Perin (born 10 August 1933) is an Italian skier. He competed at the 1956 Winter Olympics, the 1960 Winter Olympics and the 1964 Winter Olympics.
