= Carlo Ludovico Ragghianti =

Italian politician (1910–1987)

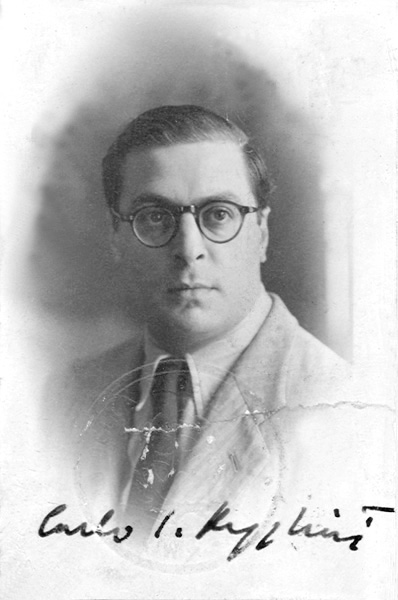
- Born: 18 March 1910; Lucca, Italy
- Died: 3 August 1987 (aged 77); Florence, Italy
- Occupation: Art critic

Carlo Ludovico Ragghianti (18 March 1910 – 3 August 1987) was an Italian art critic, historian, philosopher of art and politician.

== Life ==
Born in Lucca, Ragghianti studied in Pisa, where he was a pupil of Matteo Marangoni. His education was influenced by Benedetto Croce and by his theory of "pure visibility"; then he approached and deepened the theories of Konrad Fiedler, Alois Riegl, and Julius von Schlosser.

He started his career as a scholar in 1933 with essays on the Carracci and Giorgio Vasari; later he wrote on cinema and the entertainment industry as expressions of visual art, thus demonstrating his interest in all manifestations of the visual language. In 1935 he founded together with Ranuccio Bianchi Bandinelli the magazine Critica d'arte.

Ragghianti was among the founders of the Action Party and after 8 September 1943 he organized armed resistance in Tuscany. He was president of the Tuscan National Liberation Committee and headed the liberation of Florence on 8 August 1944. Ragghianti was undersecretary of the arts and entertainment in the Parri cabinet. From 1952 to 1965, along with his wife Licia Collobi, he directed the art magazine SeleArte. He was a member of the jury at the 16th Venice International Film Festival. He was a founding member of the Italian committee Comitato del Fondo Internazionale per Firenze after the 1966 Florence flood.
