= Werner Moring =

German cross-country skier (1927–1995)

Personal information
- Nationality: German
- Born: 27 October 1927; Hasselfelde, Germany
- Died: 27 November 1995 (aged 68); Hasselfelde, Germany

Sport
- Sport: Cross-country skiing

Werner Moring (27 October 1927 – 27 November 1995) was a German cross-country skier. He competed in the men's 30 kilometre event at the 1956 Winter Olympics.
