= Hannelore Glaser-Franke =

German alpine skier (born 1933)

Hannelore Glaser (née Franke; born 4 January 1933) is a German former alpine skier who competed in the 1952 Winter Olympics and in the 1956 Winter Olympics.
