= Fides Romanin =

Italian cross-country skier (1934–2019)

Fides Romanin (12 November 1934 – 23 October 2019) was an Italian cross-country skier who competed in the 1950s.

She was born in Forni Avoltri.

She competed in two Winter Olympics, serving as flag bearer for the Italian team at Oslo in 1952. Romanin finished 17th in the women's 10 km in Oslo.

Romanin also competed in the 1956 Winter Olympics in Cortina d'Ampezzo, finishing 31st in the 10 km and eighth in the 3 × 5 km relay.

After her 1959 retirement, Romanin married and raised four children. While a mother, she remained active in Nordic skiing, providing an inspiration for future women skiers that included Manuela Di Centa, Bice Vanzetta, Gabriella Paruzzi, and Stefania Belmondo.

== Cross-country skiing results ==
=== Olympic Games ===
Year	Age	10 km	3 × 5 km relay
1952	17	10	—N/a
1956	21	31	8

=== Italian National Championships ===
- 1951: 2nd, Italian women's championships of cross-country skiing, 10 km
- 1952: 3rd, Italian women's championships of cross-country skiing, 10 km
- 1955: 3rd, Italian women's championships of cross-country skiing, 10 km
- 1957: 2nd, Italian women's championships of cross-country skiing, 10 km
- 1958: 2nd, Italian women's championships of cross-country skiing, 10 km
- 1959: 3rd, Italian women's championships of cross-country skiing, 10 km

Winter Olympics
Preceded by Vittorio Chierroni	Flag bearer for Italy; Oslo 1952	Succeeded by Tito Tolin
