= Trampolino Olimpico =

Ski jumping hill in Cortina d'Ampezzo, Italy

Coordinates: 46.511301°N 12.146738°E

Trampolino Olimpico Italia
- Italia
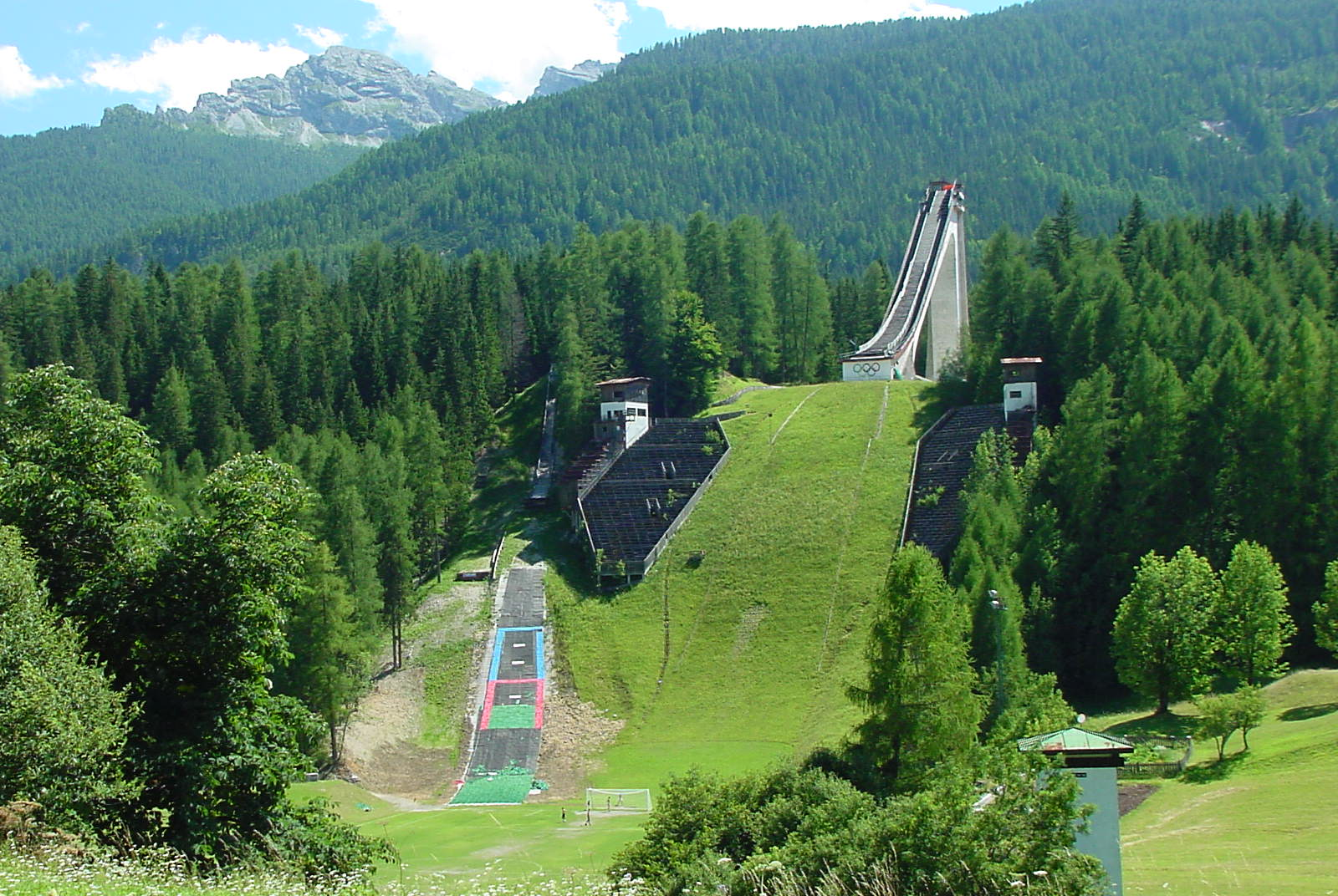
- Location: Cortina d'Ampezzo; Italy
- Opened: 1923
- Renovated: 1955
- Closed: 1990

Size
- K–point: K-90
- Hill size: NH 92 (LH 1956)
- Hill record: 92.0 m Roger Ruud (Norway); 1981 WC
- Spectator capacity: 40.000 (+10.000 hill stands)

Top events
- Olympics: 1956
- World Championships: 1927

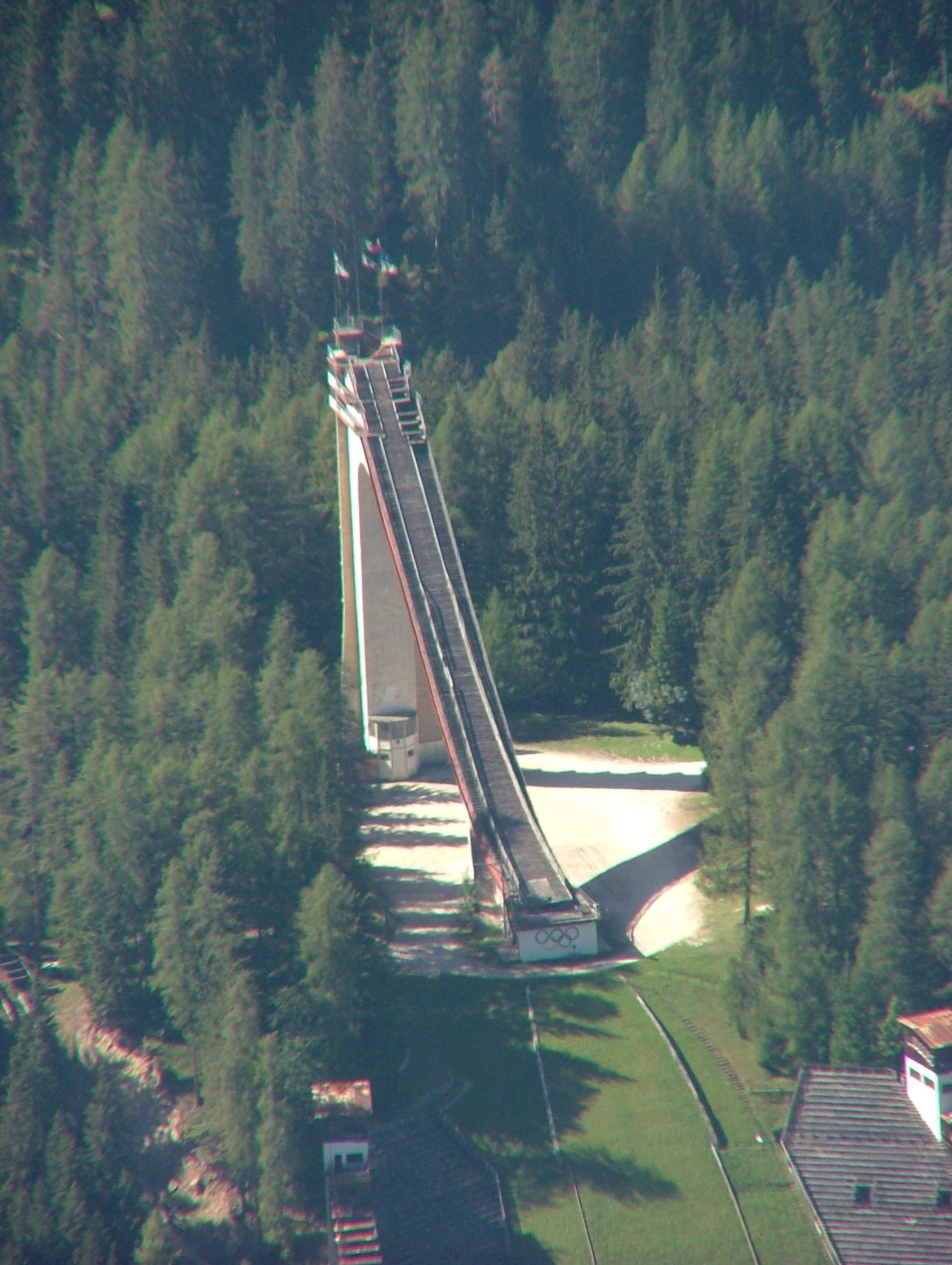
Olympic Ski Jumping Hill (Cortina d'Ampezzo)

Trampolino Olimpico Italia is a ski jumping hill (K90), built in 1955 in Cortina d'Ampezzo, Italy. It was the site of the ski jumping, Nordic combined (K90/15.0) and team events for the 1956 Winter Olympics. The Nordic combined event used a shorter in-run to allow average jumps between 60 and 70 meters while the upper starting points on the in-run were calculated to allow jumps of 70 to 80 meters. The 1956 profile had a safety limit of 14.5 m beyond the critical point of 72 m. (transition from the landing slope curve to the out-run begins at a distance of 86.5 m). Among many national and international competitions starting with the 1927 World Championships, was the inauguration of the FIS Ski Jumping World Cup in 1979. Since the venue lost its FIS-certification in 1990, the installation lies dormant. In its day, the Cortina Ski Jumping hill was regarded as one of the most innovative and still today as one of the most architecturally beautiful examples still in existence. The stadium holds a maximum of 40,000 spectators in the arena and an additional 10.000 in the stands on each side of the hill.

It was featured in a scene in the 1981 James Bond film For Your Eyes Only.

== History ==
2.5 km (2 mi) from Cortina, near Zuel, the "Italia" ski jumping hill (Trampolino Olimpico Italia) began its life in 1923 as the "Franchetti" Jump. That year, the Dolomites Sports Club, with a grant from Baron Carlo Franchetti and funds from the hotel owners of Cortina, constructed the first ski jumping installation with a modest wooden in-run platform which allowed jumps up to 40 meters.

Timeline:

- 1923 - 40 meter hill built with a modest wooden in-run structure.
- 1924 - Ski jumpers Greising and Schatz of Innsbruck (Austria), established the first hill record of 42 m.
- 1926 - First alterations to increase the length of the jump to 52 m. New hill record by Tore Edmann (Sweden) of 54 m.
- 1927 - The first Ski Jumping World Championships at Cortina.
- 1939 - Completely demolished due to new F.I.S. technical requirements for the up-coming 1941 F.I.S contests.
- 1940 - New construction with a 48 m. in-run tower, permitting jumps of 75 m. The new venue is named "Italia".
- 1941 - F.I.S. World Championships. First hill record by Sepp Weiler (Germany) of 76 m.
- 1952 - Last hill record by Ossi Laaksonen (Finland) of 78 m.
- 1955 - Again completely demolished and re-built the same year due to the technical requirements for the up-coming 1956 Olympic games.
- 1956 - The VII Olympic Winter Games see the most advanced modern ski jumping installation of the era. Hill record by Antti Hyvärinen of 84 m.
- 1979 - First round of the inaugural Ski Jumping World Cup (revisited in 1981, 1982, 1984 and 1985).
- 1981 - Last hill record of the Olympic Italia by Roger Ruud (Norway) of 92 m.
- 1990 - The "Italia" loses its F.I.S. certification due to financial constraints.
