= Germany at the 1952 Winter Olympics =

- IOC code: GER
- NOC: National Olympic Committee for Germany

in Oslo
- Competitors: 53 (41 men, 12 women) in 8 sports
- Flag bearers: Helmut Böck (cross-country, nordic)
- Medals Ranked 4th: Gold 3 Silver 2 Bronze 2 Total 7

Winter Olympics appearances (overview)
- 1928; 1932; 1936; 1948; 1952; 1956–1988; 1992; 1994; 1998; 2002; 2006; 2010; 2014; 2018; 2022; 2026

Other related appearances
- United Team of Germany (1956–1964); East Germany (1968–1988); West Germany (1968–1988)

Germany competed at the 1952 Winter Olympics in Oslo, Norway after not having been invited to the 1948 Winter Olympics because of their role in World War II, and because the NOC restored in 1947 as Deutscher Olympischer Ausschuß did not represent a recognized state yet. The Federal Republic of Germany was founded in 1949, the NOC for Germany was renamed and in 1951 recognized by the IOC while recognition of a separate National Olympic Committee of the German Democratic Republic was declined. East Germans were told to cooperate and form a united German team, which they declined in 1952, but accepted for 1956 and later.

Germany entered all events except the 1500 metres skating event, which was skipped by Germany's only speed skating entrant in favour of the other three events.

The IOC website currently uses both the codes GER or FRG for German medal winners, suggesting they represented two different teams:

- 2/14/1952 Oslo 1952 Pairs Mixed – Gold FALK, Paul / FALK, Ria – Figure skating pairs mixed Germany
- 2/14/1952 Oslo 1952 four-man Men – Gold FEDERAL REPUBLIC OF GERMANY 01 - Bobsleigh four-man men Federal Republic of Germany (1950–1990, "GER" since)

== Medalists ==
| Medal | Name | Sport | Event |
|---|---|---|---|
| Gold | Andreas Ostler; Lorenz Nieberl | Bobsleigh | Two-man |
| Gold | Andreas Ostler; Friedrich Kuhn; Lorenz Nieberl; Franz Kemser | Bobsleigh | Four-man |
| Gold | Ria Baran; Paul Falk | Figure skating | Pairs |
| Silver | Mirl Buchner | Alpine skiing | Women's downhill |
| Silver | Ossi Reichert | Alpine skiing | Women's slalom |
| Bronze | Mirl Buchner | Alpine skiing | Women's giant slalom |
| Bronze | Mirl Buchner | Alpine skiing | Women's slalom |

== Alpine skiing ==
Men

| Athlete | Event | Race 1 | | Race 2 | | Total | |
| Athlete | Event | Time | Rank | Time | Rank | Time | Rank |
|---|---|---|---|---|---|---|---|
| Pepi Schwaiger | Downhill | | | | | 2:55.5 | 38 |
| Beni Obermüller | Downhill | | | | | 2:42.9 | 17 |
| Willi Klein | Downhill | | | | | 2:42.8 | 16 |
| Pepi Erben | Giant Slalom | | | | | 2:55.0 | 47 |
| Willi Klein | Giant Slalom | | | | | 2:46.2 | 32 |
| Beni Obermüller | Giant Slalom | | | | | 2:41.4 | 28 |
| Pepi Schwaiger | Giant Slalom | | | | | 2:35.4 | 17 |
| Pepi Schwaiger | Slalom | 1:13.7 | 53 | did not advance | | | |
| Heini Bierling | Slalom | 1:09.9 | 44 | did not advance | | | |
| Willi Klein | Slalom | 1:04.2 | 20 Q | 1:04.7 | 17 | 2:08.9 | 16 |
| Beni Obermüller | Slalom | 1:04.1 | 19 Q | 1:03.4 | 12 | 2:07.5 | 13 |

Women

| Athlete | Event | Race 1 | | Race 2 | | Total | |
| Athlete | Event | Time | Rank | Time | Rank | Time | Rank |
|---|---|---|---|---|---|---|---|
| Lia Leismüller | Downhill | | | | | 2:37.6 | 35 |
| Hannelore Glaser-Franke | Downhill | | | | | 1:53.0 | 10 |
| Evi Lanig | Downhill | | | | | 1:52.9 | 9 |
| Mirl Buchner | Downhill | | | | | 1:48.0 | 2nd place, silver medalist(s) |
| Evi Lanig | Giant Slalom | | | | | 2:15.6 | 14 |
| Marianne Seltsam | Giant Slalom | | | | | 2:14.1 | 10 |
| Ossi Reichert | Giant Slalom | | | | | 2:13.2 | 8 |
| Mirl Buchner | Giant Slalom | | | | | 2:10.0 | 3rd place, bronze medalist(s) |
| Hannelore Glaser-Franke | Slalom | 1:20.7 | 33 | 1:10.1 | 18 | 2:30.8 | 31 |
| Marianne Seltsam | Slalom | 1:15.5 | 29 | 1:50.3 | 37 | 3:05.8 | 35 |
| Mirl Buchner | Slalom | 1:07.6 | 8 | 1:05.7 | 3 | 2:13.3 | 3rd place, bronze medalist(s) |
| Ossi Reichert | Slalom | 1:06.0 | 1 | 1:05.4 | 2 | 2:11.4 | 2nd place, silver medalist(s) |

== Bobsleigh ==
| Sled | Athletes | Event | Run 1 | | Run 2 | | Run 3 | | Run 4 | | Total | |
| Sled | Athletes | Event | Time | Rank | Time | Rank | Time | Rank | Time | Rank | Time | Rank |
|---|---|---|---|---|---|---|---|---|---|---|---|---|
| GER-1 | Andreas Ostler; Lorenz Nieberl | Two-man | 1:20.76 | 1 | 1:21.64 | 1 | 1:21.02 | 1 | 1:21.12 | 1 | 5:24.54 | 1st place, gold medalist(s) |
| GER-2 | Theo Kitt; Friedrich Kuhn | Two-man | 1:24.43 | 12 | 1:25.22 | 13 | 1:24.52 | 13 | 1:24.08 | 8 | 5:38.25 | 11 |

| Sled | Athletes | Event | Run 1 | | Run 2 | | Run 3 | | Run 4 | | Total | |
| Sled | Athletes | Event | Time | Rank | Time | Rank | Time | Rank | Time | Rank | Time | Rank |
|---|---|---|---|---|---|---|---|---|---|---|---|---|
| GER-1 | Andreas Ostler; Friedrich Kuhn; Lorenz Nieberl; Franz Kemser | Four-man | 1:16.86 | 1 | 1:17.57 | 1 | 1:16.55 | 1 | 1:16.86 | 1 | 5:07.84 | 1st place, gold medalist(s) |

== Cross-country skiing ==
Men

| Event | Athlete | Race | |
| Event | Athlete | Time | Rank |
|---|---|---|---|
| 18 km | Hubert Egger | DNF | – |
| 18 km | Helmut Böck | DNF | – |
| 18 km | Albert Mohr | 1'16:32 | 65 |
| 18 km | Rudi Kopp | 1'15:53 | 64 |
| 18 km | Alois Harrer | 1'14:23 | 59 |
| 18 km | Heinz Hauser | 1'13:30 | 54 |
| 50 km | Karl Schüßler | DNF | – |
| 50 km | Juku Pent | 4'30:56 | 26 |

Men's 4 × 10 km relay

| Athletes | Race | |
| Athletes | Time | Rank |
|---|---|---|
| Hubert Egger; Albert Mohr; Heinz Hauser; Rudi Kopp | 2'36:37 | 7 |

Women

| Event | Athlete | Race | |
| Event | Athlete | Time | Rank |
|---|---|---|---|
| 10 km | Hanni Gehring | 50:39 | 13 |

== Figure skating ==
Men

| Athlete | CF | FS | Points | Places | Rank |
|---|---|---|---|---|---|
| Freimut Stein | 8 | 8 | 155.956 | 72 | 8 |

Women

| Athlete | CF | FS | Points | Places | Rank |
|---|---|---|---|---|---|
| Helga Dudzinski | 12 | 8 | 142.767 | 103 | 12 |
| Erika Kraft | 9 | 10 | 143.767 | 89 | 10 |
| Gundi Busch | 10 | 6 | 146.289 | 75 | 8 |

Pairs

| Athletes | Points | Places | Rank |
|---|---|---|---|
| Ingeborg Minor; Hermann Braun | 9.089 | 73.5 | 8 |
| Ria Baran; Paul Falk | 11.400 | 11.5 | 1st place, gold medalist(s) |

== Ice hockey ==
The tournament was run in a round-robin format with nine teams participating.

| Team | Pld | W | L | T | GF | GA | Pts |
|---|---|---|---|---|---|---|---|
| Canada | 8 | 7 | 0 | 1 | 71 | 14 | 15 |
| United States | 8 | 6 | 1 | 1 | 43 | 21 | 13 |
| Sweden | 9 | 7 | 2 | 0 | 53 | 22 | 14 |
| Czechoslovakia | 9 | 6 | 3 | 0 | 50 | 23 | 12 |
| Switzerland | 8 | 4 | 4 | 0 | 40 | 40 | 8 |
| Poland | 8 | 2 | 5 | 1 | 21 | 56 | 5 |
| Finland | 8 | 2 | 6 | 0 | 21 | 60 | 4 |
| West Germany 8th | 8 | 1 | 6 | 1 | 21 | 53 | 3 |
| Norway | 8 | 0 | 8 | 0 | 15 | 46 | 0 |

- Canada 15-1 Germany
- USA 8-2 Germany
- Czechoslovakia 6-1 Germany
- Sweden 7-3 Germany
- Poland 4-4 Germany
- Norway 2-6 Germany
- Finland 5-1 Germany
- Switzerland 6-3 Germany

Contestants

- Karl Bierschel
- Markus Egen
- Karl Enzler
- Georg Guggemos
- Alfred Hoffmann
- Engelbert Holderied
- Walter Kremershof
- Ludwig Kuhn
- Dieter Niess
- Hans Georg Pescher
- Fritz Poitsch
- Herbert Schibukat
- Xaver Unsinn
- Heinz Wackers
- Karl Wild

== Nordic combined ==
Events:

- 18 km cross-country skiing
- normal hill ski jumping

The cross-country skiing part of this event was combined with the main medal event, meaning that athletes competing here were skiing for two disciplines at the same time. Details can be found above in this article, in the cross-country skiing section.

The ski jumping (normal hill) event was held separate from the main medal event of ski jumping, results can be found in the table below (athletes were allowed to perform three jumps, the best two jumps were counted and are shown here).

| Athlete | Event | Cross-country | | Ski Jumping | | | | Total | |
| Athlete | Event | Points | Rank | Distance 1 | Distance 2 | Points | Rank | Points | Rank |
|---|---|---|---|---|---|---|---|---|---|
| Helmut Böck | Individual | DNF | – | 54.5 | 58.5 | 179.0 | 22 | DNF | – |
| Heinz Hauser | Individual | 199.636 | 15 | 60.0 | 62.0 | 193.5 | 14 | 393.136 | 15 |

== Ski jumping ==
| Athlete | Event | Jump 1 | | | Jump 2 | | | Total | |
| Athlete | Event | Distance | Points | Rank | Distance | Points | Rank | Points | Rank |
|---|---|---|---|---|---|---|---|---|---|
| Franz Dengg | Normal hill | 60.0 | 96.5 | 24 | 56.5 | 91.0 | 35 | 187.5 | 31 |
| Sepp Kleisl | Normal hill | 66.5 | 108.0 | 8 | 62.5 | 100.0 | 17 | 208.0 | 10 |
| Sepp Weiler | Normal hill | 67.0 | 108.0 | 8 | 63.0 | 105.0 | 8 | 213.0 | 8 |
| Toni Brutscher | Normal hill | 66.5 | 111.0 | 3 | 62.5 | 105.5 | 7 | 216.5 | 4 |

== Speed skating ==
Men

| Event | Athlete | Race | |
| Event | Athlete | Time | Rank |
|---|---|---|---|
| 500 m | Theo Meding | 46.8 | 33 |
| 5000 m | Theo Meding | 8:57.4 | 27 |
| 10,000 m | Theo Meding | 18:24.4 | 22 |
