= List of IIHF World Championship medalists =

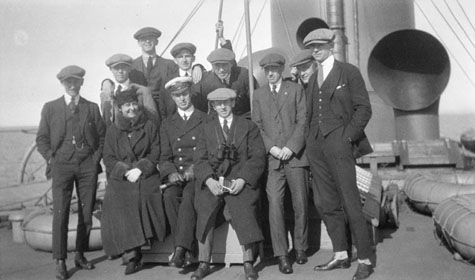
The gold medal-winning Winnipeg Falcons (representing Canada), pictured en route to the 1920 Olympics, which were counted as the first ice hockey World Championships

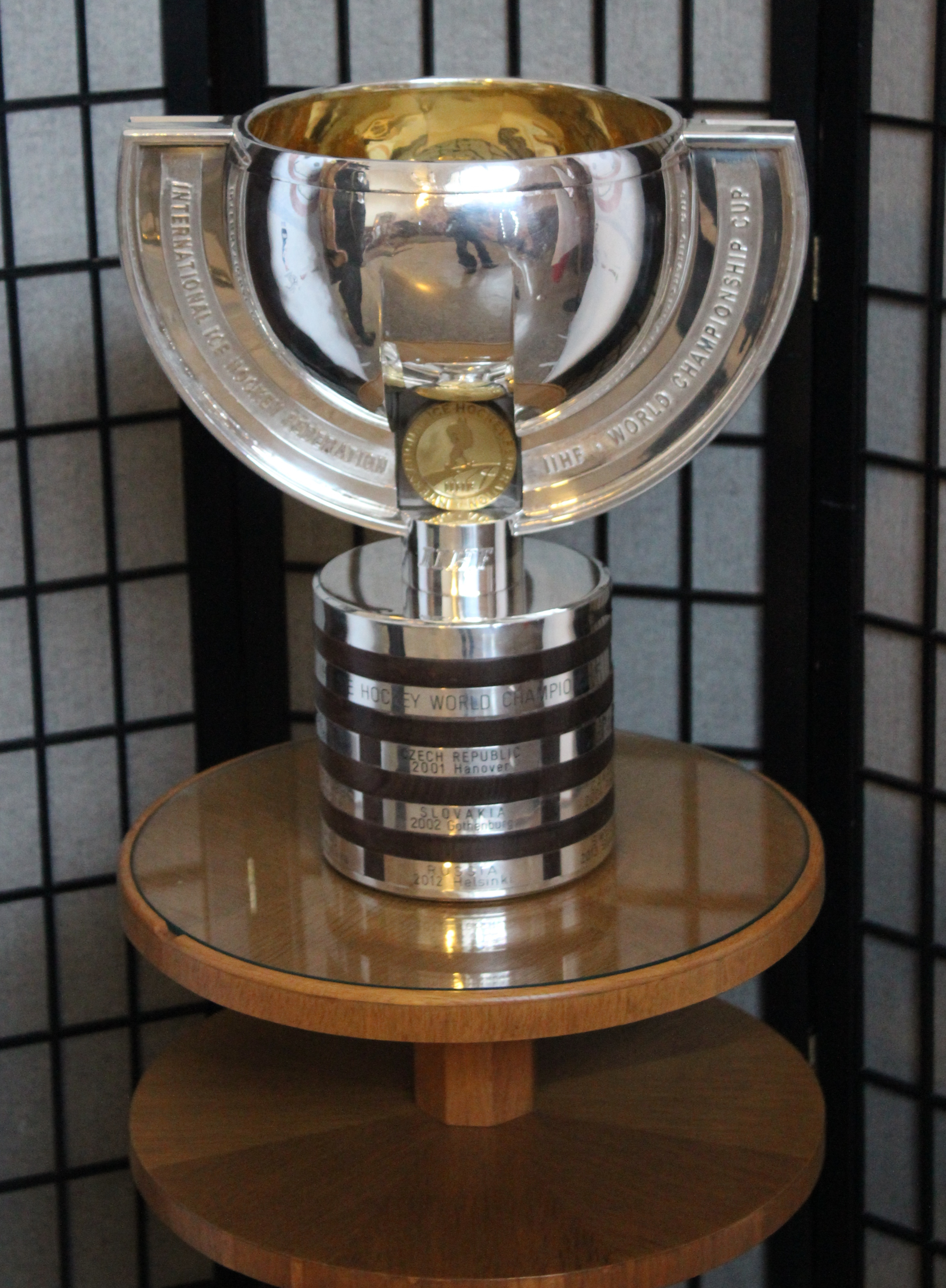
IIHF World Championship Cup

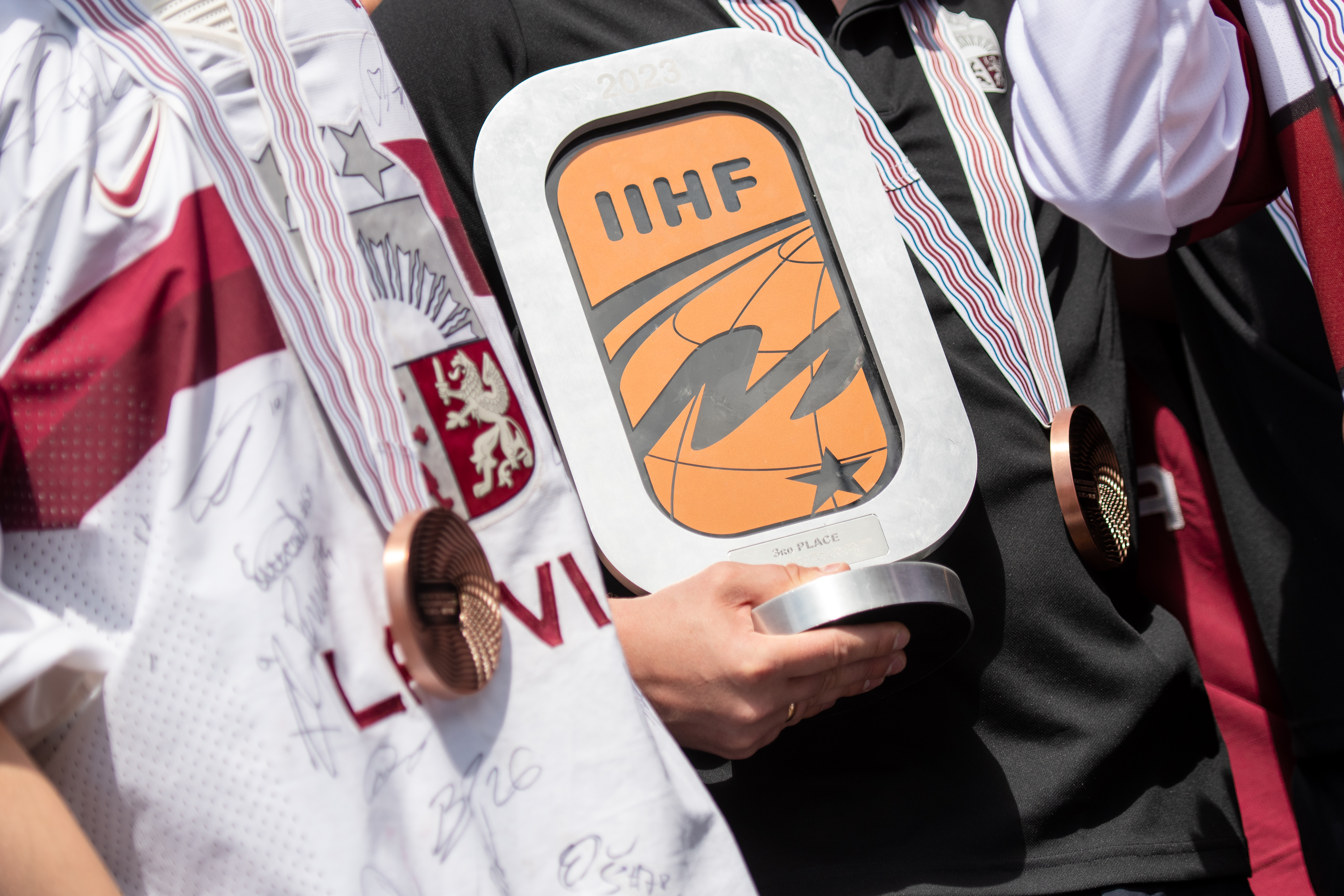
IIHF third place trophy

The Ice Hockey World Championships is an annual event held by the International Ice Hockey Federation (IIHF). It was preceded by the European Championship which was held from 1910 to 1932. The first World Championship tournament was decided at the 1920 Summer Olympics. Subsequently, ice hockey was featured at the Winter Olympic Games, where the World Championship was decided when the two events occurred concurrently, until the 1968 Winter Olympics. The first three championships were contested at the Olympics, while the first World Championships that were an individual event were held in 1930.

The modern format for the World Championship features 16 teams in the championship group, 12 teams in Division I and 12 teams in Division II. If there are more than 40 teams, the rest compete in Division III. The teams in the championship play a preliminary and qualifying round, then the top eight teams play in the playoff medal round and the winning team is crowned World Champion. From the 1920 Olympics until the 1976 World Championships, only athletes designated as "amateur" were allowed to compete in the tournament. Because of this, players from the National Hockey League and its senior minor-league teams were not allowed to compete, while the Soviet Union was allowed to use permanent full-time players who were positioned as regular workers of an aircraft industry or tractor industry employer that sponsored what would be presented as an after-hours amateur social sports society team for their workers. In 1970, after an agreement to allow just a small number of its professionals to participate was rescinded by the IIHF, Canada withdrew from the tournament. Starting in 1977, professional athletes were allowed to compete in the tournament and Canada re-entered, using some NHL players from those teams that were not good enough to reach the Stanley Cup playoffs.

Following the conclusion of the 2026 edition, 89 tournaments have been staged. From 1920 to 1930, the Winter Olympic Games Ice Hockey Tournaments held counted as the World Championships and no tournaments in between were held. No championships were held from 1940 to 1946 due to World War II, nor during the Olympic years 1980, 1984 and 1988, nor in 2020 due to COVID-19 pandemic. Ten national teams (Note: Canada, United States, Great Britain, Czechoslovakia, Sweden, the Soviet Union, Russia, Finland, Czech Republic and Slovakia.) have won a gold medal at the World Championships, five more national teams (Note: Switzerland, Germany, Austria, West Germany and Latvia.) have won medals. Canada has won 53 medals overall and 28 gold, the most of any nation. The Soviet Union, which began competing in the year of 1954 and last competed in 1991, captured a medal in each of 34 tournaments they entered. In winning the 2006 World Championships, Sweden became the first nation in ice hockey history to win an Olympic gold as well as a separate World Championship in the same season. In 2022, Finland repeated this achievement by winning the World Championships at home.

In 2023, one of the hosts Latvia earned the country's first medal, a bronze, with an overtime win against the United States. In 2026, Norway earned the country's first medal, a bronze, with an overtime win against Canada.

== Champions ==
Key

†	The Summer Olympic Games ice hockey tournament held that year counted as the World Championships (1 edition).
*	The Winter Olympic Games ice hockey tournament held that year counted as the World Championships (10 editions).
(#)	Number of times when national team has reached corresponding place at the time (or number of tournaments hosted by city / country at the time).
(#/#)	Second number indicates cumulative number of times when successor country and its predecessor per IIHF (Soviet Union, Czechoslovakia or unified Germany) has reached corresponding place at the time (or cumulative number of tournaments hosted by successor country and its predecessor at the time).

Year	Gold	Silver	Bronze	4th place	Host city / cities	Host country / countries
1920 †	Canada (1)	United States (1)	Czechoslovakia (1)	Sweden (1)	Antwerp (1)	Belgium (1)
1924 *	Canada (2)	United States (2)	Great Britain (1)	Sweden (2)	Chamonix (1)	France (1)
1928 *	Canada (3)	Sweden (1)	Switzerland (1)	Great Britain (1)	St. Moritz (1)	Switzerland (1)
1930	Canada (4)	Germany (1)	Switzerland (2)	Austria (1)	Chamonix (2); Berlin (1); Vienna (1)	France (2); Germany (1); Austria (1)
1931	Canada (5)	United States (3)	Austria (1)	Poland (1)	Krynica (1)	Poland (1)
1932 *	Canada (6)	United States (4)	Germany (1)	Poland (2)	Lake Placid (1)	United States (1)
1933	United States (1)	Canada (1)	Czechoslovakia (2)	Austria (2)	Prague (1)	Czechoslovakia (1)
1934	Canada (7)	United States (5)	Germany (2)	Switzerland (1)	Milan (1)	Italy (1)
1935	Canada (8)	Switzerland (1)	Great Britain (2)	Czechoslovakia (1)	Davos (1)	Switzerland (2)
1936 *	Great Britain (1)	Canada (2)	United States (1)	Czechoslovakia (2)	Garmisch-Partenkirchen (1)	Germany (2)
1937	Canada (9)	Great Britain (1)	Switzerland (3)	Germany (1)	London (1)	Great Britain (1)
1938	Canada (10)	Great Britain (2)	Czechoslovakia (3)	Germany (2)	Prague (2)	Czechoslovakia (2)
1939	Canada (11)	United States (6)	Switzerland (4)	Czechoslovakia (3)	Zürich (1) and Basel (1)	Switzerland (3)
1940– 1946	Competitions not held because of World War II					
1947	Czechoslovakia (1)	Sweden (2)	Austria (2)	Switzerland (2)	Prague (3)	Czechoslovakia (3)
1948 *	Canada (12)	Czechoslovakia (1)	Switzerland (5)	United States (1)	St. Moritz (2)	Switzerland (4)
1949	Czechoslovakia (2)	Canada (3)	United States (2)	Sweden (3)	Stockholm (1)	Sweden (1)
1950	Canada (13)	United States (7)	Switzerland (6)	Great Britain (2)	London (2)	Great Britain (2)
1951	Canada (14)	Sweden (3)	Switzerland (7)	Norway (1)	Paris (1)	France (3)
1952 *	Canada (15)	United States (8)	Sweden (1)	Czechoslovakia (4)	Oslo (1) and Drammen (1)	Norway (1)
1953	Sweden (1)	West Germany (1/2)	Switzerland (8)	Italy (1)	Zürich (2) and Basel (2)	Switzerland (5)
1954	Soviet Union (1)	Canada (4)	Sweden (2)	Czechoslovakia (5)	Stockholm (2)	Sweden (2)
1955	Canada (16)	Soviet Union (1)	Czechoslovakia (4)	United States (2)	Krefeld (1), Dortmund (1) and Cologne (1)	West Germany (1/3)
1956 *	Soviet Union (2)	United States (9)	Canada (1)	Sweden (4)	Cortina d'Ampezzo (1)	Italy (2)
1957	Sweden (2)	Soviet Union (2)	Czechoslovakia (5)	Finland (1)	Moscow (1)	Soviet Union (1)
1958	Canada (17)	Soviet Union (3)	Sweden (3)	Czechoslovakia (6)	Oslo (2)	Norway (2)
1959	Canada (18)	Soviet Union (4)	Czechoslovakia (6)	United States (3)	Prague (4), Bratislava (1) and Ostrava (1)	Czechoslovakia (4)
1960 *	United States (2)	Canada (5)	Soviet Union (1)	Czechoslovakia (7)	Squaw Valley (1)	United States (2)
1961	Canada (19)	Czechoslovakia (2)	Soviet Union (2)	Sweden (5)	Geneva (1) and Lausanne (1)	Switzerland (6)
1962	Sweden (3)	Canada (6)	United States (3)	Finland (2)	Colorado Springs (1) and Denver (1)	United States (3)
1963	Soviet Union (3)	Sweden (4)	Czechoslovakia (7)	Canada (1)	Stockholm (3)	Sweden (3)
1964 *	Soviet Union (4)	Sweden (5)	Czechoslovakia (8)	Canada (2)	Innsbruck (1)	Austria (2)
1965	Soviet Union (5)	Czechoslovakia (3)	Sweden (4)	Canada (3)	Tampere (1)	Finland (1)
1966	Soviet Union (6)	Czechoslovakia (4)	Canada (2)	Sweden (6)	Ljubljana (1)	Yugoslavia (1)
1967	Soviet Union (7)	Sweden (6)	Canada (3)	Czechoslovakia (8)	Vienna (2)	Austria (3)
1968 *	Soviet Union (8)	Czechoslovakia (5)	Canada (4)	Sweden (7)	Grenoble (1)	France (4)
1969	Soviet Union (9)	Sweden (7)	Czechoslovakia (9)	Canada (4)	Stockholm (4)	Sweden (4)
1970	Soviet Union (10)	Sweden (8)	Czechoslovakia (10)	Finland (3)	Stockholm (5)	Sweden (5)
1971	Soviet Union (11)	Czechoslovakia (6)	Sweden (5)	Finland (4)	Bern (1) and Geneva (2)	Switzerland (7)
1972	Czechoslovakia (3)	Soviet Union (5)	Sweden (6)	Finland (5)	Prague (5)	Czechoslovakia (5)
1973	Soviet Union (12)	Sweden (9)	Czechoslovakia (11)	Finland (6)	Moscow (2)	Soviet Union (2)
1974	Soviet Union (13)	Czechoslovakia (7)	Sweden (7)	Finland (7)	Helsinki (1)	Finland (2)
1975	Soviet Union (14)	Czechoslovakia (8)	Sweden (8)	Finland (8)	Munich (1) and Düsseldorf (1)	West Germany (2/4)
1976	Czechoslovakia (4)	Soviet Union (6)	Sweden (9)	United States (4)	Katowice (1)	Poland (2)
1977	Czechoslovakia (5)	Sweden (10)	Soviet Union (3)	Canada (5)	Vienna (3)	Austria (4)
1978	Soviet Union (15)	Czechoslovakia (9)	Canada (5)	Sweden (8)	Prague (6)	Czechoslovakia (6)
1979	Soviet Union (16)	Czechoslovakia (10)	Sweden (10)	Canada (6)	Moscow (3)	Soviet Union (3)
1980	Competition not held during 1980 Olympics					
1981	Soviet Union (17)	Sweden (11)	Czechoslovakia (12)	Canada (7)	Gothenburg (1) and Stockholm (6)	Sweden (6)
1982	Soviet Union (18)	Czechoslovakia (11)	Canada (6)	Sweden (9)	Helsinki (2) and Tampere (2)	Finland (3)
1983	Soviet Union (19)	Czechoslovakia (12)	Canada (7)	Sweden (10)	Düsseldorf (2), Dortmund (2) and Munich (2)	West Germany (3/5)
1984	Competition not held during 1984 Olympics					
1985	Czechoslovakia (6)	Canada (7)	Soviet Union (4)	United States (5)	Prague (7)	Czechoslovakia (7)
1986	Soviet Union (20)	Sweden (12)	Canada (8)	Finland (9)	Moscow (4)	Soviet Union (4)
1987	Sweden (4)	Soviet Union (7)	Czechoslovakia (13)	Canada (8)	Vienna (4)	Austria (5)
1988	Competition not held during 1988 Olympics					
1989	Soviet Union (21)	Canada (8)	Czechoslovakia (14)	Sweden (11)	Stockholm (7) and Södertälje (1)	Sweden (7)
1990	Soviet Union (22)	Sweden (13)	Czechoslovakia (15)	Canada (9)	Bern (2) and Fribourg (1)	Switzerland (8)
1991	Sweden (5)	Canada (9)	Soviet Union (5)	United States (6)	Turku (1), Helsinki (3) and Tampere (3)	Finland (4)
1992	Sweden (6)	Finland (1)	Czechoslovakia (16)	Switzerland (3)	Prague (8) and Bratislava (2)	Czechoslovakia (8)
1993	Russia (1/23)	Sweden (14)	Czech Republic (1/17)	Canada (10)	Dortmund (3) and Munich (3)	Germany (3/6)
1994	Canada (20)	Finland (2)	Sweden (11)	United States (7)	Bolzano (1), Canazei (1) and Milan (2)	Italy (3)
1995	Finland (1)	Sweden (15)	Canada (9)	Czech Republic (1/9)	Stockholm (8) and Gävle (1)	Sweden (8)
1996	Czech Republic (1/7)	Canada (10)	United States (4)	Russia (1/1)	Vienna (5)	Austria (6)
1997	Canada (21)	Sweden (16)	Czech Republic (2/18)	Russia (2/2)	Helsinki (4), Turku (2) and Tampere (4)	Finland (5)
1998	Sweden (7)	Finland (3)	Czech Republic (3/19)	Switzerland (4)	Zürich (3) and Basel (3)	Switzerland (9)
1999	Czech Republic (2/8)	Finland (4)	Sweden (12)	Canada (11)	Oslo (3), Lillehammer (1) and Hamar (1)	Norway (3)
2000	Czech Republic (3/9)	Slovakia (1)	Finland (1)	Canada (12)	Saint Petersburg (1)	Russia (1/5)
2001	Czech Republic (4/10)	Finland (5)	Sweden (13)	United States (8)	Cologne (2), Hanover (1) and Nuremberg (1)	Germany (4/7)
2002	Slovakia (1)	Russia (1/8)	Sweden (14)	Finland (10)	Gothenburg (2), Karlstad (1) and Jönköping (1)	Sweden (9)
2003	Canada (22)	Sweden (17)	Slovakia (1)	Czech Republic (2/10)	Helsinki (5), Tampere (5) and Turku (3)	Finland (6)
2004	Canada (23)	Sweden (18)	United States (5)	Slovakia (1)	Prague (9) and Ostrava (2)	Czech Republic (1/9)
2005	Czech Republic (5/11)	Canada (11)	Russia (1/6)	Sweden (12)	Innsbruck (2) and Vienna (6)	Austria (7)
2006	Sweden (8)	Czech Republic (1/13)	Finland (2)	Canada (13)	Riga (1)	Latvia (1)
2007	Canada (24)	Finland (6)	Russia (2/7)	Sweden (13)	Moscow (5) and Mytishchi (1)	Russia (2/6)
2008	Russia (2/24)	Canada (12)	Finland (3)	Sweden (14)	Halifax (1) and Quebec City (1)	Canada (1)
2009	Russia (3/25)	Canada (13)	Sweden (15)	United States (9)	Kloten (1) and Bern (3)	Switzerland (10)
2010	Czech Republic (6/12)	Russia (2/9)	Sweden (16)	Germany (3/3)	Cologne (3), Mannheim (1) and Gelsenkirchen (1)	Germany (5/8)
2011	Finland (2)	Sweden (19)	Czech Republic (4/20)	Russia (3/3)	Bratislava (3) and Košice (1)	Slovakia (1)
2012	Russia (4/26)	Slovakia (2)	Czech Republic (5/21)	Finland (11)	Helsinki (6); Stockholm (9)	Finland (7); Sweden (10)
2013	Sweden (9)	Switzerland (2)	United States (6)	Finland (12)	Stockholm (10); Helsinki (7)	Sweden (11); Finland (8)
2014	Russia (5/27)	Finland (7)	Sweden (17)	Czech Republic (3/11)	Minsk (1)	Belarus (1)
2015	Canada (25)	Russia (3/10)	United States (7)	Czech Republic (4/12)	Prague (10) and Ostrava (3)	Czech Republic (2/10)
2016	Canada (26)	Finland (8)	Russia (3/8)	United States (10)	Moscow (6) and Saint Petersburg (2)	Russia (3/7)
2017	Sweden (10)	Canada (14)	Russia (4/9)	Finland (13)	Cologne (4); Paris (2)	Germany (6/9); France (5)
2018	Sweden (11)	Switzerland (3)	United States (8)	Canada (14)	Copenhagen (1) and Herning (1)	Denmark (1)
2019	Finland (3)	Canada (15)	Russia (5/10)	Czech Republic (5/13)	Bratislava (4) and Košice (2)	Slovakia (2)
2020	Competition cancelled due to the COVID-19 pandemic					
2021	Canada (27)	Finland (9)	United States (9)	Germany (4/4)	Riga (2)	Latvia (2)
2022	Finland (4)	Canada (16)	Czechia (6/22)	United States (11)	Tampere (6) and Helsinki (8)	Finland (9)
2023	Canada (28)	Germany (2/3)	Latvia (1)	United States (12)	Tampere (7); Riga (3)	Finland (10); Latvia (3)
2024	Czechia (7/13)	Switzerland (4)	Sweden (18)	Canada (15)	Prague (11) and Ostrava (4)	Czechia (3/11)
2025	United States (3)	Switzerland (5)	Sweden (19)	Denmark (1)	Stockholm (11); Herning (2)	Sweden (12); Denmark (2)
2026	Finland (5)	Switzerland (6)	Norway (1)	Canada (16)	Zürich (4) and Fribourg (2)	Switzerland (11)
2027					Düsseldorf (3) and Mannheim (2)	Germany (7/10)
2028					Paris (3) and Lyon (1)	France (6)
2029					Bratislava (5) and Košice (3)	Slovakia (3)
2030					Helsinki (9); Riga (4)	Finland (11); Latvia (4)

== Medal table ==
Winners of the Ice Hockey World Championships with number of wins. (Note: Note that championships won by the Soviet Union are credited to Russia, and those of Czechoslovakia are counted for the Czech Republic.) 1 2–4 5–9 10–24 25+

National teams in italics no longer compete at the World Championships.

Rank	National team (Note: The IIHF medal table is grouped by its member associations.)	Gold	Silver	Bronze	Total
1	Canada	28	16	9	53
2	Soviet Union (Note: Soviet Union won 22 gold medals, 7 silver medals and 5 bronze medals (34 medals in total).) / Russia (Note: Russia, who succeeded the Soviet Union in IIHF competitions, won 5 gold medals, 3 silver medals and 5 bronze medals (13 medals in total). Russia is currently banned from participating in international tournaments due to the Russian invasion of Ukraine.)	27	10	10	47
3	Czechoslovakia (Note: Czechoslovakia won 6 gold medals, 12 silver medals and 16 bronze medals (34 medals in total).) / Czechia (Note: Czechia (also known as the Czech Republic) assumed the IIHF membership of the Czech Ice Hockey Association following the dissolution of Czechoslovakia, and have won 7 gold medals, 1 silver medal and 6 bronze medals (14 medals in total) since 1993. The Slovak Ice Hockey Federation was founded in 1993 and their medal totals do not include those won by Czechoslovakia as per the IIHF.)	13	13	22	48
4	Sweden	11	19	19	49
5	Finland	5	9	3	17
6	United States	3	9	9	21
7	Great Britain	1	2	2	5
8	Slovakia (Note: The Slovak Ice Hockey Federation was founded in 1993, and admitted as a member of the IIHF in the same year. As per the IIHF, their medal totals do not include those won by the Czech Ice Hockey Association represented by national team of Czechoslovakia.)	1	2	1	4
9	Switzerland	0	6	8	14
10	Germany (Note: Germany won 2 silver medals and 2 bronze medals (4 medals in total).) / West Germany (Note: West Germany succeeded Germany in IIHF competitions, both of which were governed by the German Ice Hockey Federation. From 1949 until reunification of country in 1990, West Germany won 1 silver medal.)	0	3	2	5
11	Austria	0	0	2	2
12	Latvia	0	0	1	1
12	Norway	0	0	1	1
Totals (16 nations)		89	89	89	267

== Most successful players ==
Boldface denotes active ice hockey players and highest medal count among all players (including these who not included in these tables) per type. "Position" denotes player position on the hockey rink (D – defenceman; F – forward; G – goaltender).

=== Multiple gold medalists ===
Rank	Player	Country	Position	From	To	Gold	Silver	Bronze	Total
1	Vladislav Tretiak	Soviet Union	G	1970	1983	**10**	2	1	**13**
2	Alexander Ragulin	Soviet Union	D	1961	1973	**10**	1	1	12
3	Alexander Maltsev	Soviet Union	F	1969	1983	9	2	1	12
4	Vladimir Petrov	Soviet Union	F	1969	1981	9	1	1	11
5	Vyacheslav Starshinov	Soviet Union	F	1961	1971	9	–	1	10
6	Vitali Davydov	Soviet Union	D	1963	1971	9	–	–	9
7	Valeri Kharlamov	Soviet Union	F	1969	1979	8	2	1	11
7	Vladimir Lutchenko	Soviet Union	D	1969	1979	8	2	1	11
7	Boris Mikhailov	Soviet Union	F	1969	1979	8	2	1	11
7	Valeri Vasiliev	Soviet Union	D	1970	1982	8	2	1	11

=== Multiple medalists ===
The table shows players who have won at least 11 medals in total at the World Championships.

Rank	Player	Country	Position	From	To	Gold	Silver	Bronze	Total
1	Vladislav Tretiak	Soviet Union	G	1970	1983	**10**	2	1	**13**
2	Jiří Holík	Czechoslovakia	F	1964	1977	3	**6**	4	**13**
3	Alexander Ragulin	Soviet Union	D	1961	1973	**10**	1	1	12
4	Alexander Maltsev	Soviet Union	F	1969	1983	9	2	1	12
5	Vladimir Petrov	Soviet Union	F	1969	1981	9	1	1	11
6	Valeri Kharlamov	Soviet Union	F	1969	1979	8	2	1	11
6	Vladimir Lutchenko	Soviet Union	D	1969	1979	8	2	1	11
6	Boris Mikhailov	Soviet Union	F	1969	1979	8	2	1	11
6	Valeri Vasiliev	Soviet Union	D	1970	1982	8	2	1	11
10	Sergei Makarov	Soviet Union	F	1978	1991	8	1	2	11
11	Viacheslav Fetisov	Soviet Union	D	1977	1991	7	1	3	11
12	Veniamin Alexandrov	Soviet Union	F	1957	1968	6	3	2	11
13	Ivan Hlinka	Czechoslovakia	F	1970	1981	3	5	3	11
13	Oldřich Machač	Czechoslovakia	D	1968	1978	3	5	3	11
13	Vladimír Martinec	Czechoslovakia	F	1970	1981	3	5	3	11

=== Best performers by country ===
Here are listed most successful players in the history of each of 15 medal-winning national teams – according to the gold-first ranking system and by total number of World Championships medals (one player if he holds national records in both categories or few players if these national records belongs to different persons). If the total number of medals is identical, the gold, silver and bronze medals are used as tie-breakers (in that order). If all numbers are the same, the players get the same placement and are sorted by the alphabetic order.

Country	Player	Position	From	To	Gold	Silver	Bronze	Total
Soviet Union	Vladislav Tretiak	G	1970	1983	**10**	2	1	**13**
Czechia	David Výborný	F	1996	2006	5	1	2	8
Czechoslovakia	Jiří Holík	F	1964	1977	3	**6**	4	**13**
Sweden	Jonas Bergqvist (by the gold-first ranking system)	F	1986	1998	3	3	1	7
Sweden	Sven "Tumba" Johansson (by total number of medals)	F	1952	1965	3	2	4	9
Russia	**Alexander Ovechkin**	F	2005	2019	3	2	4	9
Finland	**Mikael Granlund** (by the gold-first ranking system)	F	2011	2026	3	1	–	4
Finland	Ville Peltonen (by total number of medals)	F	1994	2008	1	4	3	8
Canada	Eric Brewer (by the gold-first ranking system)	D	2003	2007	3	–	–	3
Canada	Shane Doan & Dany Heatley (by total number of medals)	F	2003	2009	2	3	–	5
Great Britain	Gordon Dailley	F/D	1935	1938	1	2	1	4
Great Britain	Gerry Davey	F/D	1935	1938	1	2	1	4
Slovakia	Miroslav Šatan	F	2000	2012	1	2	1	4
United States	John Garrison & John Mayasich (by the gold-first ranking system)	D/F; F/D	1932; 1956	1936; 1962	1; 1	1; 1	1; 1	3; 3
United States	Allen Van (by total number of medals)	D	1939	1952	–	3	1	4
Switzerland	**Nino Niederreiter** (by the gold-first ranking system)	F	2013	2026	–	5	–	5
Switzerland	Richard "Bibi" Torriani (by total number of medals)	F	1928	1948	–	1	**5**	6
Germany	Gustav Jaenecke	F/D	1930	1934	–	1	2	3
Germany	Walter Leinweber	G	1930	1934	–	1	2	3
Germany	Erich Römer	D/F	1930	1934	–	1	2	3
West Germany	16 players (Note: Martin Beck, Anton Biersack, Karl Bierschel, Otto Brandenburg, Markus Egen, Karl Enzler, Georg Guggemos, Bruno Guttowski, Alfred Hoffmann, Ulli Jansen, Walter Kremershof, Dieter Niess, Fritz Poitsch, Hans Rampf, Kurt Sepp and Xaver Unsinn.)	D, F, G	1953	1953	–	1	–	1
Austria	Fritz Demmer	F	1931	1947	–	–	2	2
Latvia	27 players (Note: Rodrigo Ābols, Toms Andersons, Rūdolfs Balcers, Uvis Balinskis, Oskars Batņa, Arvils Bergmanis, Rihards Bukarts, Roberts Bukarts, Oskars Cibuļskis, Kārlis Čukste, Kaspars Daugaviņš, Andris Džeriņš, Mārtiņš Dzierkals, Ralfs Freibergs, Georgs Golovkovs, Kristers Gudļevskis, Miks Indrašis, Jānis Jaks, Ronalds Ķēniņš, Renārs Krastenbergs, Dans Ločmelis, Roberts Mamčics, Ivars Punnenovs, Kristiāns Rubīns, Artūrs Šilovs, Deniss Smirnovs and Kristaps Zīle.)	D, F, G	2023	2023	–	–	1	1
Norway	27 players (Note: Eskild Bakke Olsen, Jacob Berglund, Michael Brandsegg-Nygård, Patrick Elvsveen, Mikkel Eriksen, Henrik Haukeland, Sander Hurrod, Johannes Johannesen, Christian Kåsastul, Tinus Luc Koblar, Victor Kopperstad, Max Krogdahl, Andreas Martinsen, Tobias Normann, Mikkel Øby Olsen, Thomas Olsen, Kristian Østby, Håvard Østrem Salsten, Mathias Emilio Pettersen, Martin Rønnild, Eirik Salsten, Adrian Saxrud-Danielsen, Mathias Schjerpen Arnkværn, Stian Solberg, Noah Steen, Petter Vesterheim and Markus Vikingstad)	D, F, G	2026	2026	–	–	1	1

== See also ==
- List of IIHF World Championship directorate award winners
- List of IIHF World Junior Championship medalists
- IIHF World Women's Championship
- 4 Nations Cup
- List of ice hockey players who won the Olympic Gold and the IIHF Championship
- Ice hockey at the Olympic Games
