= Krefeld Pinguine =

German ice hockey team founded 1936

- City: Krefeld, Germany
- League: DEL
- Founded: 1936
- Home arena: Yayla Arena (capacity: 8,029)
- Colors
- General manager: Peter Draisaitl
- Head coach: Thomas Popiesch
- Captain: Alexander Weiss
- Website: krefeld-pinguine.de

The Krefeld Pinguine (Krefeld Penguins) are an ice hockey team in the DEL. Their home ice is in Krefeld, North Rhine-Westphalia, Germany at the Yayla Arena. Founded in 1936 by entrepreneur Willi Münstermann, the pro team became a limited liability company in 1994 and joined the top tier Deutsche Eishockey Liga (DEL). In their history, they have won the German championship three times: 1951, 1952, and 2003. They won promotion to the DEL on two occasions in 1991 and in 2026 after beating Dynamo Weiswasser and Kassel Huskies respectively in promotion playoffs.

== Team names ==
- 1936 as "Krefelder Eislauf-Verein 1936 e.V." (KEV)
- 1978 as "EHC Krefeld"
- 1981 as "Krefelder Eislauf-Verein 1981 e.V."
- 1995 as "KEV Pinguine Eishockey GmbH"

== Season records ==
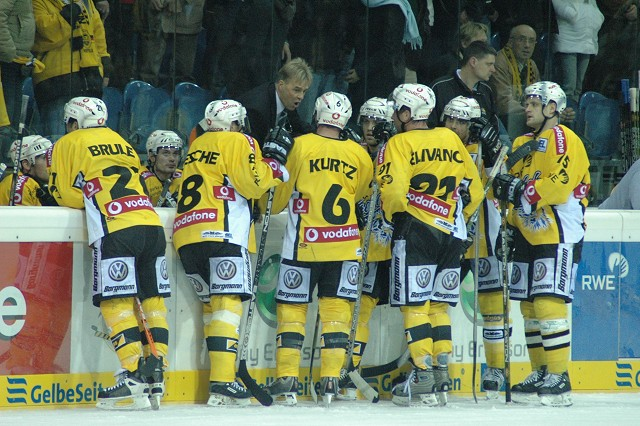
Krefeld Pinguine team in 2004

Season	Games	Won	Lost	Tie	OTL	SOL	Points	Goals for	Goals against	Rank	Playoffs
1994–95	44	29	12	3	-	-	63	203	127	4	Lost in semi-finals
1995–96	50	26	19	5	-	-	58	169	154	7	Lost in quarterfinals
1996–97	48	28	15	2	3	-	61	198	166	8	Lost in quarterfinals
1997–98	44	18	19	6	1	-	43	126	141	11	Lost in quarterfinals
1998–99	52	23	18	7	4	-	87	183	159	7	Lost in quarterfinals
1999–00	56	34	17	0	5	-	101	213	171	3	Lost in quarterfinals
2000–01	60	27	22	0	11	-	88	182	177	9	No playoffs
2001–02	60	40	16	0	4	-	118	210	162	3	Lost in quarterfinals
2002–03	52	28	22	2	0	-	78	147	133	6	Champions
2003–04	52	22	26	0	4	-	64	127	149	10	No playoffs
2004–05	52	26	23	0	3	-	73	145	159	9	No playoffs
2005–06	52	28	20	-	0	4	79	173	169	8	Lost in quarterfinals
2006–07	52	24	23	-	2	3	71	170	173	10	Lost in preliminary round
2007–08	56	25	23	-	3	5	80	191	193	11	No playoffs
2008–09	52	28	20	-	3	1	84	167	140	6	Lost in quarterfinals
2009–10	56	24	28	-	0	4	72	167	173	12	No playoffs
2010–11	52	27	16	-	3	6	86	143	130	4	Lost in semi-finals
2011–12	52	18	23	-	2	5	69	126	153	12	No playoffs
2012–13	52	20	15	-	1	5	88	166	145	3	Lost in semi-finals
2013–14	52	29	18	-	2	0	95	169	136	2	Lost in quarterfinals
2014–15	52	20	23	-	1	1	76	156	168	10	Lost in preliminary round
2015–16	52	15	26	-	4	2	61	136	164	13	No playoffs
2016–17	52	17	29	-	5	1	51	120	173	14	No playoffs
2017–18	52	17	25	-	7	3	55	141	177	14	No playoffs
2018–19	52	23	26	-	2	1	61	141	170	11	No playoffs
2019–20	52	15	29	-	4	4	52	134	170	12	Cancelled due to the COVID-19 pandemic.
2020–21	38	5	29	-	2	2	18	74	167	14	No playoffs
2021–22	56	22	29	-	4	1	59	144	203	15	No playoffs; Relegated

== Players ==
=== Current roster ===
Updated 17 July 2022.

No.	Nat	Player	Pos	S/G	Age	Acquired	Birthplace
77	(Germany)	Tom-Eric Bappert	D	L	27	2019	Menden, Germany
72	(Russia)	Sergey Belov	G	L	32	2020	Moscow, Russia
52	(Germany)	Denis Miller	F	R	26	2022	Tübingen, Germany
–	(United States)	Ben Johnson	C	L	32	2023	Calumet, Michigan, United States
9	(Germany)	Marcel Müller	LW	L	37	2022	Berlin, Germany
17	(Germany)	Leon Niederberger	RW	L	30	2020	Düsseldorf, Germany
25	(Russia)	Nikita Shatsky	RW	L	31	2020	Podolsk, Russia
16	(Germany)	Pascal Zerressen	D	L	33	2022	Tönisvorst, Germany

=== Honored members ===
- 1 Karel Lang
- 2 Uwe Fabig
- 4 Vic Stanfield
- 7 Lothar Kremershof
- 23 Herberts Vasiļjevs
- 80 Robert Müller

=== Notable alumni ===
- René Bielke (1993–1995)
- Karl Bierschel (1948–1963)
- Christoph Brandner (2000–2003)
- Dick Decloe (1974–1978)
- Christian Ehrhoff (1999–2003, 2012)
- Uwe Fabig (1981–1983/1984–1992)
- Bruno Guttowski (1951–1958)
- Peter Ihnacak (1992–1997)
- Ulli Jansen † (1947–1972)
- Günter Jochems (1949–1965)
- Josef Kompalla (1958–1971)
- Erich Konecki † (1948–1952)
- Lothar Kremershof † (1969–1978/1981–1985)
- Karel Lang (1990–2001)
- Petri Liimatainen (1995–1999)
- Chris Lindberg (1994–1998)
- Jan Marek (1974–1978)
- Robert Müller † (2002–2006)
- Alexander Selivanov (2003–2008)
- Hans Georg Pescher (1948–1956)
- Brad Purdie (2000–2003)
- James Sargent (1994–1995)
- Herbert Schibukat (1949–1954)
- Tim Stützle (2014–2017)
- Vic Stanfield (1976–1978, 1980–1988)
- Herberts Vasiļjevs (2005–2017)
- Heinz Wackers (1936–1955)
- Remy Wellen (1955–1972)

==== Notable coaches ====
- Jiří Ehrenberger
- Martin Jíranek
- Rick Adduono
- Butch Goring
