= Willi Münstermann =

German entrepreneur

Willi Münstermann (1903–1982) was a German entrepreneur. He did much towards the development of the sport of ice hockey in Germany, and was a founder and sponsor of the Krefeld Penguins, a top league ice hockey team, in 1936.
