= Lothar Kremershof =

German ice hockey player

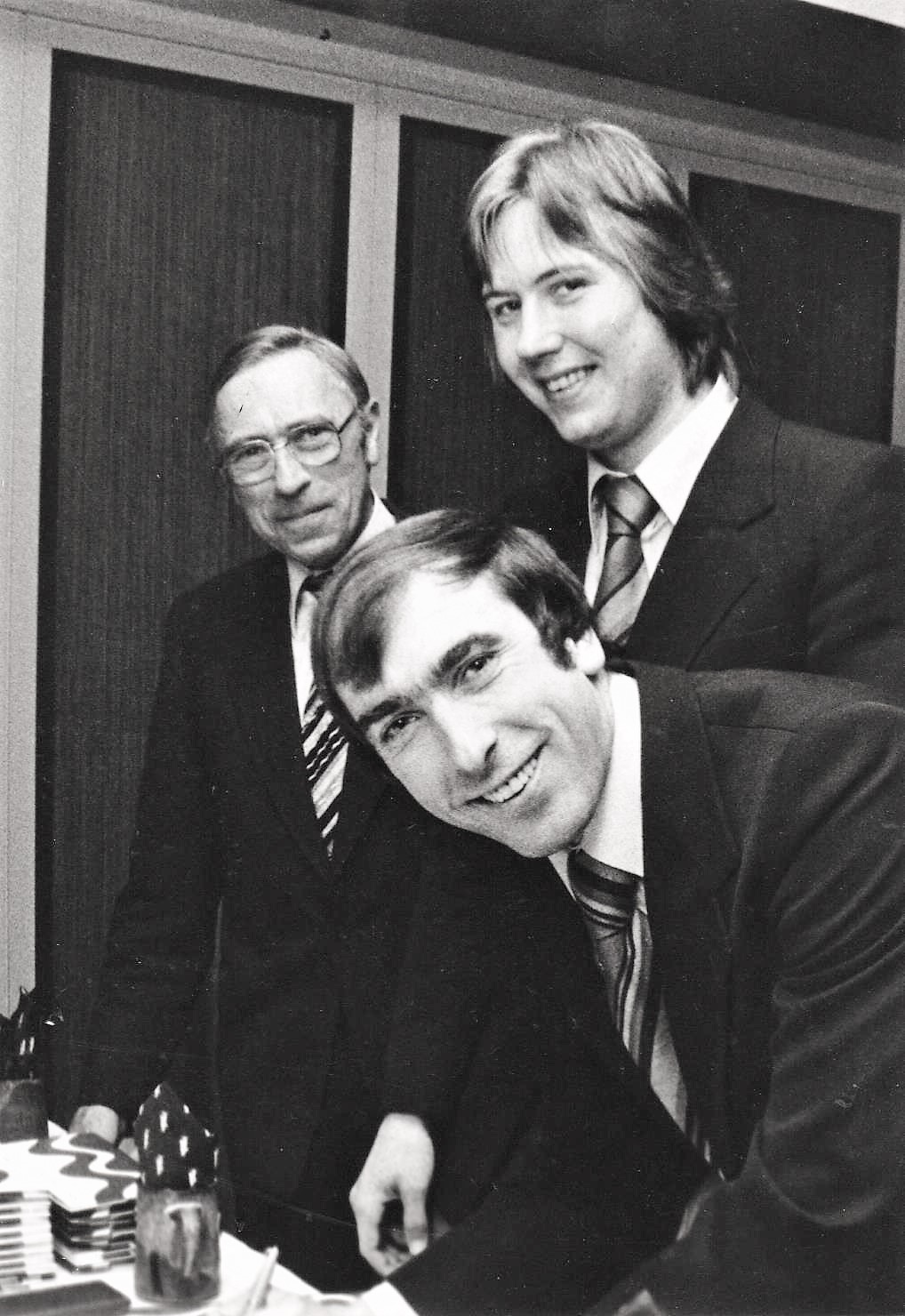
- Born: 4 March 1953 Krefeld
- Died: 1 December 2003 (aged 50) Tönisvorst
- Height: 6 ft 2 in (188 cm)
- Weight: 209 lb (95 kg; 14 st 13 lb)
- Position: Forward
- Played for: Krefeld Pinguine to 1978 Düsseldorf EC 1978-1981 Krefeld Pinguine 1981-1985 Neuss SC 1985 -1987
- Playing career: 1979–1988

Lothar Kremershof was a German ice hockey player.

== Career ==
Born in Krefeld, Kremershof was the starting striker for the Krefeld Pinguine, with whom he won the local title in 1977. He then went to DEG Metro Stars which at the time was named Düsseldorf EC. At Düsseldorf EC he went on to score 27 goals and assisted in 57 in 42 games during the 1979–80 ice hockey Bundesliga season.

After his playing career ended he we went on to coach teams such as Grefrather EV and Neuss SC.
