= Uwe Fabig =

German ice hockey player

- Born: 17 October 1961 (age 65) Krefeld, West Germany
- Height: 6 ft 0 in (183 cm)
- Weight: 214 lb (97 kg; 15 st 4 lb)
- Position: Defencemen
- Played for: Krefeld Pinguine; ESG Kassel; Grefrather EV
- Playing career: 1981–1992

Uwe Fabig (born 17 October 1961) was a professional ice hockey player. He captained the Krefeld Pinguine team in 1991.

== Career statistics ==
			Regular season					Playoffs
Season	Team	League	GP	G	A	Pts	PIM	GP	G	A	Pts	PIM
1981–82	Krefelder EV	Germany2	31	1	3	4	49	—	—	—	—	—
1982–83	Krefelder EV	Germany2	16	1	0	1	33	—	—	—	—	—
1983–84	ESG Kassel	Germany2	29	4	5	9	92	—	—	—	—	—
1984–85	Krefelder EV	Germany2	40	6	3	9	46	—	—	—	—	—
1985–86	Krefelder EV	Germany2	44	2	11	13	88	—	—	—	—	—
1986–87	Krefelder EV	Germany2	40	5	9	14	83	—	—	—	—	—
1987–88	Krefelder EV	Germany2	35	7	12	19	75	—	—	—	—	—
1988–89	Krefelder EV	Germany2	33	3	14	17	51	—	—	—	—	—
1989–90	Krefelder EV	Germany2	32	0	15	15	80	—	—	—	—	—
1990–91	Krefelder EV	Germany2	32	1	7	8	105	18	2	7	9	52
1991–92	Krefelder EV	Germany	40	0	4	4	113	4	1	0	1	2
1994–95	Grefrather EV	Germany3	14	2	4	6	28	—	—	—	—	—
Germany2 totals			332	30	79	109	702	51	7	25	32	152
