= Remy Wellen =

German ice hockey player

- Born: 1 September 1938 (age 88) Krefeld, West Germany
- Position: Forward
- Played for: Krefelder EV 1936
- National team: West Germany
- Playing career: 1955–1972; 1978–1979

Remigius “Remy” Wellen (born 1 September 1938) is a German former professional ice hockey forward.

Wellen played his entire career with his hometown team Krefelder EV 1936, now known as the Krefeld Pinguine. He also became the trainer of the team in 1978. Wellen played in the 1961 Ice Hockey World Championships for West Germany.

His father Karl Wellen, was one of the founding members of the team, then known as Krefelder Eislauf-Vereins.
