= Willi Klein =

German alpine skier (1927–1997)

Personal information
- Nationality: German
- Born: 18 February 1927; Oberstdorf, Germany
- Died: 6 November 1997 (aged 70); Las Palmas, Spain

Sport
- Sport: Alpine skiing

Willi Klein (18 February 1927 – 6 November 1997) was a German alpine skier. He competed in three events at the 1952 Winter Olympics.
