= Heinz Wackers =

German ice hockey player

- Born: 20 September 1925 Krefeld, Germany
- Died: 31 December 2012 (aged 87) Krefeld, Germany
- Position: Goaltender
- Shot: Left
- Played for: Krefeld Pinguine
- National team: West Germany
- Playing career: 1951–1952

Oscar Hans Heinrich Wackers (20 September 1925 – 31 December 2012) was a professional ice hockey player. He represented Germany in the 1952 Winter Olympics, where the team finished 8th in the rankings.
