= Theo Meding =

German speed skater

Personal information
- Nationality: German
- Born: 6 May 1931
- Died: 16 July 1971 (aged 40)

Sport
- Sport: Speed skating

Theo Meding (6 May 1931 – 16 July 1971) was a German speed skater. He competed in two events at the 1952 Winter Olympics.
