= Heinz Hauser =

German Nordic combined skier (1920–1996)

Heinz Hauser (born 23 December 1920 in Waltersdorf – 22 November 1996) was a West German Nordic skier who competed in the 1950s. He finished 15th in the Nordic combined event and 54th in the 18 km cross-country skiing event at the 1952 Winter Olympics in Oslo. Hauser was also four time national champion in the Nordic combined event (1952–1954, 1956). Hauser also competed in the 1956 Winter Olympics as well. He died in Reit im Winkl.
