= 2023 IIHF World Championship rosters =

Each team's roster consisted of at least 15 skaters (forwards and defencemen) and two goaltenders, and at most 22 skaters and three goaltenders. All 16 participating nations, through the confirmation of their respective national associations, had to submit a roster by the first IIHF directorate meeting.

Age and team as of 12 May 2023. Flags are only for foreign coaches.

== Group A ==
=== Austria ===
A 26-player roster was announced on 30 April. The final squad was revealed on 7 May 2023.

Head coach: (Switzerland) Roger Bader

| No. | Pos. | Name | Height | Weight | Birthdate | Team |
|---|---|---|---|---|---|---|
| 3 | F | Peter Schneider | 1.83 m (6 ft 0 in) | 91 kg (201 lb) | 4 April 1991 (aged 32) | (Austria) Red Bull Salzburg |
| 5 | F | Thomas Raffl – C | 1.94 m (6 ft 4 in) | 104 kg (229 lb) | 19 June 1986 (aged 36) | (Austria) Red Bull Salzburg |
| 9 | F | Ali Wukovits | 1.84 m (6 ft 0 in) | 83 kg (183 lb) | 9 May 1996 (aged 27) | (Austria) Red Bull Salzburg |
| 12 | D | David Maier | 1.87 m (6 ft 2 in) | 85 kg (187 lb) | 12 January 2000 (aged 23) | (Austria) EC KAC |
| 13 | D | Philipp Wimmer | 1.93 m (6 ft 4 in) | 93 kg (205 lb) | 13 December 2001 (aged 21) | (Austria) Red Bull Salzburg |
| 14 | D | Kilian Zündel | 1.79 m (5 ft 10 in) | 80 kg (180 lb) | 17 January 2001 (aged 22) | (Switzerland) HC Ambrì-Piotta |
| 16 | F | Dominic Zwerger | 1.83 m (6 ft 0 in) | 93 kg (205 lb) | 16 July 1996 (aged 26) | (Switzerland) HC Ambrì-Piotta |
| 17 | F | Manuel Ganahl – A | 1.82 m (6 ft 0 in) | 81 kg (179 lb) | 12 July 1990 (aged 32) | (Austria) EC KAC |
| 20 | D | Nico Brunner | 1.81 m (5 ft 11 in) | 78 kg (172 lb) | 17 September 1992 (aged 30) | (Austria) Vienna Capitals |
| 21 | F | Lukas Haudum | 1.83 m (6 ft 0 in) | 84 kg (185 lb) | 21 May 1997 (aged 25) | (Austria) EC KAC |
| 23 | F | Marco Rossi | 1.76 m (5 ft 9 in) | 83 kg (183 lb) | 23 September 2001 (aged 21) | (United States) Iowa Wild |
| 24 | D | Steven Strong | 1.83 m (6 ft 0 in) | 87 kg (192 lb) | 16 February 1993 (aged 30) | (Austria) EC KAC |
| 26 | F | Oliver Achermann | 1.95 m (6 ft 5 in) | 93 kg (205 lb) | 16 January 1994 (aged 29) | (Switzerland) HC La Chaux-de-Fonds |
| 29 | G | Bernhard Starkbaum | 1.86 m (6 ft 1 in) | 91 kg (201 lb) | 19 February 1986 (aged 37) | (Austria) Vienna Capitals |
| 30 | G | David Kickert | 1.88 m (6 ft 2 in) | 81 kg (179 lb) | 16 March 1994 (aged 29) | (Austria) Red Bull Salzburg |
| 31 | G | David Madlener | 1.87 m (6 ft 2 in) | 88 kg (194 lb) | 31 March 1992 (aged 31) | (Austria) Pioneers Vorarlberg |
| 32 | D | Bernd Wolf | 1.78 m (5 ft 10 in) | 84 kg (185 lb) | 23 February 1997 (aged 26) | (Switzerland) HC Lugano |
| 41 | F | Henrik Neubauer | 1.83 m (6 ft 0 in) | 85 kg (187 lb) | 15 April 1997 (aged 26) | (Austria) EK Zeller Eisbären |
| 48 | F | Lucas Thaler | 1.80 m (5 ft 11 in) | 76 kg (168 lb) | 21 February 2002 (aged 21) | (Austria) Red Bull Salzburg |
| 52 | F | Paul Huber | 1.93 m (6 ft 4 in) | 101 kg (223 lb) | 10 June 2000 (aged 22) | (Austria) Red Bull Salzburg |
| 64 | D | David Reinbacher | 1.89 m (6 ft 2 in) | 85 kg (187 lb) | 25 October 2004 (aged 18) | (Switzerland) EHC Kloten |
| 70 | F | Benjamin Nissner | 1.81 m (5 ft 11 in) | 80 kg (180 lb) | 30 November 1997 (aged 25) | (Austria) Red Bull Salzburg |
| 78 | D | Thimo Nickl | 1.88 m (6 ft 2 in) | 80 kg (180 lb) | 4 December 2001 (aged 21) | (Sweden) AIK IF |
| 91 | D | Dominique Heinrich – A | 1.75 m (5 ft 9 in) | 76 kg (168 lb) | 31 July 1990 (aged 32) | (Austria) Red Bull Salzburg |
| 96 | F | Mario Huber | 1.88 m (6 ft 2 in) | 85 kg (187 lb) | 8 August 1996 (aged 26) | (Austria) Red Bull Salzburg |

=== Denmark ===
A 25-player roster was announced on 25 April.

Head coach: Heinz Ehlers

| No. | Pos. | Name | Height | Weight | Birthdate | Team |
|---|---|---|---|---|---|---|
| 1 | G | William Rørth | 1.77 m (5 ft 10 in) | 72 kg (159 lb) | 20 September 1999 (aged 23) | (Denmark) Rødovre Mighty Bulls |
| 9 | F | Frederik Storm | 1.80 m (5 ft 11 in) | 86 kg (190 lb) | 20 February 1989 (aged 34) | (Germany) ERC Ingolstadt |
| 12 | F | Oscar Mølgaard | 1.83 m (6 ft 0 in) | 74 kg (163 lb) | 18 February 2005 (aged 18) | (Sweden) HV71 |
| 14 | D | Jacob Gammelgaard | 1.90 m (6 ft 3 in) | 91 kg (201 lb) | 23 December 1995 (aged 27) | (Denmark) Rungsted Ishockey Klub |
| 15 | D | Matias Lassen | 1.82 m (6 ft 0 in) | 82 kg (181 lb) | 15 March 1996 (aged 27) | (Sweden) Malmö Redhawks |
| 17 | F | Nicklas Jensen | 1.91 m (6 ft 3 in) | 98 kg (216 lb) | 6 March 1993 (aged 30) | (Switzerland) SC Rapperswil-Jona Lakers |
| 19 | F | Matthias Asperup | 1.82 m (6 ft 0 in) | 84 kg (185 lb) | 3 March 1995 (aged 28) | (Denmark) Herlev Eagles |
| 22 | D | Markus Lauridsen | 1.86 m (6 ft 1 in) | 87 kg (192 lb) | 28 February 1991 (aged 32) | (Sweden) Malmö Redhawks |
| 24 | F | Nikolaj Ehlers | 1.85 m (6 ft 1 in) | 82 kg (181 lb) | 14 February 1996 (aged 27) | (Canada) Winnipeg Jets |
| 25 | D | Oliver Lauridsen | 1.97 m (6 ft 6 in) | 93 kg (205 lb) | 24 March 1989 (aged 34) | (Sweden) Malmö Redhawks |
| 27 | D | Anders Krogsgaard | 1.85 m (6 ft 1 in) | 82 kg (181 lb) | 19 April 1996 (aged 27) | (Germany) Fischtown Pinguins |
| 32 | G | Mathias Seldrup | 1.80 m (5 ft 11 in) | 82 kg (181 lb) | 21 October 1996 (aged 26) | (Denmark) Esbjerg Energy |
| 34 | D | Morten Jensen | 1.83 m (6 ft 0 in) | 82 kg (181 lb) | 1 March 1997 (aged 26) | (Denmark) Rungsted Ishockey Klub |
| 38 | F | Morten Poulsen | 1.86 m (6 ft 1 in) | 95 kg (209 lb) | 9 September 1988 (aged 34) | (Denmark) Herning Blue Fox |
| 39 | G | Georg Sørensen | 1.76 m (5 ft 9 in) | 75 kg (165 lb) | 15 May 1995 (aged 27) | (Denmark) Aalborg Pirates |
| 40 | D | Anders Koch | 1.88 m (6 ft 2 in) | 83 kg (183 lb) | 2 October 1997 (aged 25) | (Denmark) Aalborg Pirates |
| 41 | D | Jesper Jensen – C | 1.83 m (6 ft 0 in) | 93 kg (205 lb) | 30 July 1991 (aged 31) | (Austria) EC KAC |
| 42 | F | Mikkel Aagaard | 1.84 m (6 ft 0 in) | 81 kg (179 lb) | 18 October 1995 (aged 27) | (Sweden) Modo Hockey |
| 47 | D | Oliver Larsen | 1.85 m (6 ft 1 in) | 94 kg (207 lb) | 25 December 1998 (aged 24) | (Finland) Mikkelin Jukurit |
| 50 | F | Mathias Bau Hansen | 2.00 m (6 ft 7 in) | 108 kg (238 lb) | 3 July 1993 (aged 29) | (Denmark) Herning Blue Fox |
| 54 | F | Felix Scheel | 1.83 m (6 ft 0 in) | 89 kg (196 lb) | 1 September 1992 (aged 30) | (Denmark) Esbjerg Energy |
| 63 | F | Patrick Russell – A | 1.86 m (6 ft 1 in) | 92 kg (203 lb) | 4 January 1993 (aged 30) | (Sweden) Linköping HC |
| 65 | F | Christian Wejse | 1.86 m (6 ft 1 in) | 88 kg (194 lb) | 4 December 1998 (aged 24) | (Germany) Fischtown Pinguins |
| 71 | F | Niklas Andersen | 1.80 m (5 ft 11 in) | 86 kg (190 lb) | 20 November 1997 (aged 25) | (Germany) Fischtown Pinguins |
| 80 | G | Frederik Dichow | 1.95 m (6 ft 5 in) | 87 kg (192 lb) | 1 March 2001 (aged 22) | (Sweden) Frölunda HC |
| 89 | F | Mikkel Bødker – A | 1.81 m (5 ft 11 in) | 95 kg (209 lb) | 16 December 1989 (aged 33) | (Sweden) HV71 |
| 95 | F | Nick Olesen | 1.85 m (6 ft 1 in) | 84 kg (185 lb) | 14 November 1995 (aged 27) | (Sweden) Brynäs IF |

=== Finland ===
The roster was announced on 7 May 2023.

Head coach: Jukka Jalonen

| No. | Pos. | Name | Height | Weight | Birthdate | Team |
|---|---|---|---|---|---|---|
| 2 | D | Ville Pokka | 1.83 m (6 ft 0 in) | 90 kg (200 lb) | 3 June 1994 (aged 28) | (Sweden) Färjestad BK |
| 3 | D | Olli Määttä – A | 1.87 m (6 ft 2 in) | 89 kg (196 lb) | 22 August 1994 (aged 28) | (United States) Detroit Red Wings |
| 4 | D | Mikko Lehtonen | 1.83 m (6 ft 0 in) | 89 kg (196 lb) | 16 January 1994 (aged 29) | (Switzerland) ZSC Lions |
| 6 | D | Niklas Friman | 1.89 m (6 ft 2 in) | 94 kg (207 lb) | 30 August 1993 (aged 29) | (Sweden) Brynäs IF |
| 10 | F | Joel Armia | 1.93 m (6 ft 4 in) | 90 kg (200 lb) | 31 May 1993 (aged 29) | (Canada) Montreal Canadiens |
| 12 | F | Marko Anttila – C | 2.03 m (6 ft 8 in) | 108 kg (238 lb) | 27 May 1985 (aged 37) | (Finland) Oulun Kärpät |
| 19 | F | Waltteri Merelä | 1.88 m (6 ft 2 in) | 89 kg (196 lb) | 6 July 1998 (aged 24) | (Finland) Tappara |
| 23 | D | Nikolas Matinpalo | 1.90 m (6 ft 3 in) | 94 kg (207 lb) | 5 October 1998 (aged 24) | (Finland) Porin Ässät |
| 24 | F | Hannes Björninen | 1.85 m (6 ft 1 in) | 89 kg (196 lb) | 19 October 1995 (aged 27) | (Sweden) Brynäs IF |
| 29 | F | Ahti Oksanen | 1.91 m (6 ft 3 in) | 94 kg (207 lb) | 10 March 1993 (aged 30) | (Sweden) IK Oskarshamn |
| 30 | G | Christian Heljanko | 1.80 m (5 ft 11 in) | 74 kg (163 lb) | 2 April 1997 (aged 26) | (Finland) Tappara |
| 33 | G | Emil Larmi | 1.82 m (6 ft 0 in) | 84 kg (185 lb) | 28 September 1996 (aged 26) | (Sweden) Växjö Lakers |
| 42 | F | Kasperi Kapanen | 1.83 m (6 ft 0 in) | 82 kg (181 lb) | 23 July 1996 (aged 26) | (United States) St. Louis Blues |
| 45 | G | Jussi Olkinuora | 1.88 m (6 ft 2 in) | 91 kg (201 lb) | 4 November 1990 (aged 32) | (Sweden) Brynäs IF |
| 50 | D | Miika Koivisto | 1.84 m (6 ft 0 in) | 88 kg (194 lb) | 20 July 1990 (aged 32) | (Sweden) Växjö Lakers |
| 52 | D | Mikael Seppälä | 1.88 m (6 ft 2 in) | 91 kg (201 lb) | 8 March 1994 (aged 29) | (Finland) Tappara |
| 55 | D | Atte Ohtamaa | 1.88 m (6 ft 2 in) | 92 kg (203 lb) | 6 November 1987 (aged 35) | (Finland) Oulun Kärpät |
| 65 | F | Sakari Manninen | 1.70 m (5 ft 7 in) | 71 kg (157 lb) | 10 February 1992 (aged 31) | (United States) Henderson Silver Knights |
| 70 | F | Teemu Hartikainen | 1.86 m (6 ft 1 in) | 91 kg (201 lb) | 3 May 1990 (aged 33) | (Switzerland) Genève-Servette HC |
| 74 | F | Antti Suomela | 1.83 m (6 ft 0 in) | 81 kg (179 lb) | 17 March 1994 (aged 29) | (Sweden) IK Oskarshamn |
| 76 | F | Jere Sallinen | 1.88 m (6 ft 2 in) | 91 kg (201 lb) | 26 October 1990 (aged 32) | (Switzerland) EHC Biel |
| 82 | F | Harri Pesonen | 1.82 m (6 ft 0 in) | 88 kg (194 lb) | 6 August 1988 (aged 34) | (Switzerland) SCL Tigers |
| 84 | F | Kaapo Kakko | 1.87 m (6 ft 2 in) | 82 kg (181 lb) | 13 February 2001 (aged 22) | (United States) New York Rangers |
| 91 | F | Juho Lammikko | 1.90 m (6 ft 3 in) | 91 kg (201 lb) | 29 January 1996 (aged 27) | (Switzerland) ZSC Lions |
| 96 | F | Mikko Rantanen – A | 1.93 m (6 ft 4 in) | 96 kg (212 lb) | 29 October 1996 (aged 26) | (United States) Colorado Avalanche |

=== France ===
A 26-player roster was announced on 1 May. The final squad was revealed on 9 May 2023.

Head coach: Philippe Bozon

| No. | Pos. | Name | Height | Weight | Birthdate | Team |
|---|---|---|---|---|---|---|
| 3 | F | Charles Bertrand | 1.85 m (6 ft 1 in) | 92 kg (203 lb) | 5 February 1991 (aged 32) | (Germany) ERC Ingolstadt |
| 5 | D | Enzo Guebey | 1.84 m (6 ft 0 in) | 90 kg (200 lb) | 6 May 1999 (aged 24) | (Switzerland) ZSC Lions |
| 6 | D | Vincent Llorca | 1.93 m (6 ft 4 in) | 91 kg (201 lb) | 16 January 1992 (aged 31) | (France) Ducs d'Angers |
| 7 | D | Pierre Crinon | 1.95 m (6 ft 5 in) | 105 kg (231 lb) | 2 August 1995 (aged 27) | (France) Brûleurs de Loups |
| 8 | D | Hugo Gallet | 1.92 m (6 ft 4 in) | 93 kg (205 lb) | 20 June 1997 (aged 25) | (Finland) KalPa |
| 12 | F | Valentin Claireaux – A | 1.80 m (5 ft 11 in) | 89 kg (196 lb) | 5 April 1991 (aged 32) | (France) Dragons de Rouen |
| 13 | F | Peter Valier | 1.80 m (5 ft 11 in) | 83 kg (183 lb) | 27 July 1992 (aged 30) | (France) Boxers de Bordeaux |
| 22 | F | Guillaume Leclerc | 1.73 m (5 ft 8 in) | 80 kg (180 lb) | 20 February 1996 (aged 27) | (Hungary) Fehérvár AV19 |
| 24 | F | Justin Addamo | 1.98 m (6 ft 6 in) | 113 kg (249 lb) | 27 May 1998 (aged 24) | (United States) Wilkes-Barre/Scranton Penguins |
| 25 | F | Nicolas Ritz – A | 1.80 m (5 ft 11 in) | 87 kg (192 lb) | 26 February 1992 (aged 31) | (France) Ducs d'Angers |
| 27 | D | Jules Boscq | 1.83 m (6 ft 0 in) | 79 kg (174 lb) | 22 February 2002 (aged 21) | (France) Boxers de Bordeaux |
| 29 | F | Louis Boudon | 1.80 m (5 ft 11 in) | 84 kg (185 lb) | 4 October 1998 (aged 24) | (United States) Iowa Heartlanders |
| 32 | G | Quentin Papillon | 1.77 m (5 ft 10 in) | 79 kg (174 lb) | 7 April 1997 (aged 26) | (France) Scorpions de Mulhouse |
| 33 | G | Julian Junca | 1.95 m (6 ft 5 in) | 92 kg (203 lb) | 15 February 1998 (aged 25) | (France) Rapaces de Gap |
| 37 | G | Sebastian Ylönen | 1.86 m (6 ft 1 in) | 83 kg (183 lb) | 3 July 1991 (aged 31) | (France) Jokers de Cergy-Pontoise |
| 42 | F | Alexandre Texier | 1.85 m (6 ft 1 in) | 88 kg (194 lb) | 13 September 1999 (aged 23) | (Switzerland) ZSC Lions |
| 62 | D | Florian Chakiachvili | 1.86 m (6 ft 1 in) | 88 kg (194 lb) | 18 March 1992 (aged 31) | (France) Dragons de Rouen |
| 72 | F | Jordann Perret | 1.79 m (5 ft 10 in) | 81 kg (179 lb) | 15 October 1994 (aged 28) | (Czech Republic) Mountfield HK |
| 74 | D | Thomas Thiry | 1.91 m (6 ft 3 in) | 102 kg (225 lb) | 9 September 1997 (aged 25) | (Switzerland) HC Ajoie |
| 77 | F | Sacha Treille – C | 1.93 m (6 ft 4 in) | 96 kg (212 lb) | 6 November 1987 (aged 35) | (France) Brûleurs de Loups |
| 78 | F | Dylan Fabre | 1.78 m (5 ft 10 in) | 77 kg (170 lb) | 10 November 2000 (aged 22) | (France) Brûleurs de Loups |
| 81 | F | Anthony Rech | 1.80 m (5 ft 11 in) | 85 kg (187 lb) | 9 July 1992 (aged 30) | (Germany) Iserlohn Roosters |
| 85 | D | Lucien Onno | 1.80 m (5 ft 11 in) | 80 kg (180 lb) | 12 May 1999 (aged 24) | (France) Brûleurs de Loups |
| 94 | F | Tim Bozon | 1.86 m (6 ft 1 in) | 92 kg (203 lb) | 24 March 1994 (aged 29) | (Switzerland) Lausanne HC |
| 95 | F | Kévin Bozon | 1.87 m (6 ft 2 in) | 90 kg (200 lb) | 30 December 1995 (aged 27) | (Switzerland) HC Ajoie |
| 96 | F | Loïc Fanier | 1.82 m (6 ft 0 in) | 83 kg (183 lb) | 28 April 1996 (aged 27) | (France) Jokers de Cergy-Pontoise |

=== Germany ===
The roster was announced on 10 May.

Head coach: Harold Kreis

| No. | Pos. | Name | Height | Weight | Birthdate | Team |
|---|---|---|---|---|---|---|
| 1 | G | Dustin Strahlmeier | 1.90 m (6 ft 3 in) | 96 kg (212 lb) | 17 May 1992 (aged 30) | (Germany) Grizzlys Wolfsburg |
| 6 | D | Kai Wissmann | 1.90 m (6 ft 3 in) | 88 kg (194 lb) | 22 October 1996 (aged 26) | (United States) Providence Bruins |
| 7 | F | Maximilian Kastner | 1.80 m (5 ft 11 in) | 84 kg (185 lb) | 3 January 1993 (aged 30) | (Germany) EHC Red Bull München |
| 9 | D | Leon Gawanke | 1.86 m (6 ft 1 in) | 90 kg (200 lb) | 31 May 1999 (aged 23) | (Canada) Manitoba Moose |
| 27 | D | Maksymilian Szuber | 1.91 m (6 ft 3 in) | 92 kg (203 lb) | 25 August 2002 (aged 20) | (Germany) EHC Red Bull München |
| 28 | F | Samuel Soramies | 1.85 m (6 ft 1 in) | 88 kg (194 lb) | 30 June 1998 (aged 24) | (Germany) Augsburger Panther |
| 33 | F | JJ Peterka | 1.80 m (5 ft 11 in) | 85 kg (187 lb) | 14 January 2002 (aged 21) | (United States) Buffalo Sabres |
| 35 | G | Mathias Niederberger | 1.80 m (5 ft 11 in) | 80 kg (180 lb) | 26 November 1992 (aged 30) | (Germany) EHC Red Bull München |
| 37 | G | Maximilian Franzreb | 1.83 m (6 ft 0 in) | 98 kg (216 lb) | 18 August 1996 (aged 26) | (Germany) Fischtown Pinguins |
| 38 | D | Fabio Wagner | 1.82 m (6 ft 0 in) | 83 kg (183 lb) | 17 September 1995 (aged 27) | (Germany) ERC Ingolstadt |
| 40 | F | Alexander Ehl | 1.75 m (5 ft 9 in) | 76 kg (168 lb) | 28 November 1999 (aged 23) | (Germany) Düsseldorfer EG |
| 41 | D | Jonas Müller | 1.83 m (6 ft 0 in) | 88 kg (194 lb) | 19 November 1995 (aged 27) | (Germany) Eisbären Berlin |
| 53 | D | Moritz Seider | 1.92 m (6 ft 4 in) | 90 kg (200 lb) | 6 April 2001 (aged 22) | (United States) Detroit Red Wings |
| 56 | F | Manuel Wiederer | 1.83 m (6 ft 0 in) | 82 kg (181 lb) | 21 November 1996 (aged 26) | (Germany) Eisbären Berlin |
| 57 | D | Leon Hüttl | 1.82 m (6 ft 0 in) | 80 kg (180 lb) | 21 September 2000 (aged 22) | (Germany) ERC Ingolstadt |
| 60 | F | Wojciech Stachowiak | 1.85 m (6 ft 1 in) | 85 kg (187 lb) | 3 July 1999 (aged 23) | (Germany) ERC Ingolstadt |
| 62 | F | Parker Tuomie | 1.76 m (5 ft 9 in) | 77 kg (170 lb) | 31 October 1995 (aged 27) | (Germany) Straubing Tigers |
| 72 | F | Dominik Kahun – A | 1.80 m (5 ft 11 in) | 79 kg (174 lb) | 2 July 1995 (aged 27) | (Switzerland) SC Bern |
| 74 | F | Justin Schütz | 1.81 m (5 ft 11 in) | 82 kg (181 lb) | 24 June 2000 (aged 22) | (Germany) EHC Red Bull München |
| 77 | F | Daniel Fischbuch | 1.80 m (5 ft 11 in) | 80 kg (180 lb) | 19 August 1993 (aged 29) | (Germany) Düsseldorfer EG |
| 78 | F | Nico Sturm | 1.89 m (6 ft 2 in) | 85 kg (187 lb) | 3 May 1995 (aged 28) | (United States) San Jose Sharks |
| 91 | D | Moritz Müller – C | 1.87 m (6 ft 2 in) | 92 kg (203 lb) | 19 November 1986 (aged 36) | (Germany) Kölner Haie |
| 92 | F | Marcel Noebels – A | 1.92 m (6 ft 4 in) | 92 kg (203 lb) | 14 March 1992 (aged 31) | (Germany) Eisbären Berlin |
| 95 | F | Frederik Tiffels | 1.83 m (6 ft 0 in) | 87 kg (192 lb) | 20 May 1995 (aged 27) | (Germany) EHC Red Bull München |
| 97 | F | Filip Varejcka | 1.81 m (5 ft 11 in) | 85 kg (187 lb) | 9 January 2001 (aged 22) | (Germany) EHC Red Bull München |

=== Hungary ===
A 27-player roster was announced on 5 May. The final squad was revealed on 10 May.

Head coach: (United States) Kevin Constantine

| No. | Pos. | Name | Height | Weight | Birthdate | Team |
|---|---|---|---|---|---|---|
| 1 | G | Bence Bálizs | 1.93 m (6 ft 4 in) | 95 kg (209 lb) | 30 May 1990 (aged 32) | (Poland) JKH GKS Jastrzębie |
| 4 | D | Tamás Pozsgai – A | 1.85 m (6 ft 1 in) | 88 kg (194 lb) | 26 July 1988 (aged 34) | (Hungary) MAC Budapest |
| 6 | D | Bence Szirányi | 1.89 m (6 ft 2 in) | 80 kg (180 lb) | 17 February 1988 (aged 35) | (Hungary) DVTK Jegesmedvék |
| 8 | D | Bence Szabó | 1.84 m (6 ft 0 in) | 89 kg (196 lb) | 2 February 1998 (aged 25) | (Hungary) MAC Budapest |
| 10 | F | Gergő Nagy – C | 1.91 m (6 ft 3 in) | 96 kg (212 lb) | 10 October 1989 (aged 33) | (Hungary) Ferencvárosi TC |
| 12 | D | Bence Stipsicz | 1.86 m (6 ft 1 in) | 86 kg (190 lb) | 3 February 1997 (aged 26) | (Hungary) Fehérvár AV19 |
| 13 | F | Krisztián Nagy | 1.80 m (5 ft 11 in) | 87 kg (192 lb) | 28 July 1994 (aged 28) | (Hungary) MAC Budapest |
| 14 | F | Balázs Sebők | 1.85 m (6 ft 1 in) | 90 kg (200 lb) | 14 December 1994 (aged 28) | (Finland) Ilves |
| 16 | F | Dániel Kóger | 1.91 m (6 ft 3 in) | 89 kg (196 lb) | 10 November 1989 (aged 33) | (Romania) CSM Corona Brașov |
| 17 | D | Roland Kiss | 1.83 m (6 ft 0 in) | 81 kg (179 lb) | 17 April 1999 (aged 24) | (Hungary) DVTK Jegesmedvék |
| 18 | F | Karol Csányi | 1.83 m (6 ft 0 in) | 86 kg (190 lb) | 24 January 1991 (aged 32) | (Slovakia) HKM Zvolen |
| 20 | F | István Sofron | 1.89 m (6 ft 2 in) | 91 kg (201 lb) | 24 February 1988 (aged 35) | (Romania) HSC Csíkszereda |
| 21 | F | Kristóf Papp | 1.79 m (5 ft 10 in) | 80 kg (180 lb) | 27 June 2001 (aged 21) | (United States) Northern Michigan Wildcats |
| 22 | F | Vilmos Galló | 1.82 m (6 ft 0 in) | 86 kg (190 lb) | 31 July 1996 (aged 26) | (Sweden) Linköping HC |
| 23 | D | Zétény Hadobás | 1.87 m (6 ft 2 in) | 85 kg (187 lb) | 2 March 2003 (aged 20) | (Sweden) Västerås IK |
| 24 | F | Kristóf Németh | 1.84 m (6 ft 0 in) | 79 kg (174 lb) | 13 May 2002 (aged 20) | (Hungary) Fehérvár AV19 |
| 28 | F | István Bartalis | 1.86 m (6 ft 1 in) | 88 kg (194 lb) | 7 September 1990 (aged 32) | (Hungary) Fehérvár AV19 |
| 33 | D | Milán Horváth | 1.86 m (6 ft 1 in) | 93 kg (205 lb) | 2 February 2001 (aged 22) | (Hungary) Fehérvár AV19 |
| 34 | F | István Terbócs | 1.83 m (6 ft 0 in) | 92 kg (203 lb) | 28 June 1996 (aged 26) | (Hungary) Fehérvár AV19 |
| 35 | G | Dominik Horváth | 1.86 m (6 ft 1 in) | 91 kg (201 lb) | 8 January 2001 (aged 22) | (Hungary) Fehérvár AV19 |
| 36 | F | Csanád Erdély | 1.88 m (6 ft 2 in) | 86 kg (190 lb) | 5 April 1996 (aged 27) | (Hungary) Fehérvár AV19 |
| 44 | D | Nándor Fejes | 1.86 m (6 ft 1 in) | 83 kg (183 lb) | 16 January 1999 (aged 24) | (Romania) Gyergyói HK |
| 59 | G | Gergely Arany | 1.91 m (6 ft 3 in) | 89 kg (196 lb) | 29 December 1996 (aged 26) | (Hungary) Ferencvárosi TC |
| 61 | F | Péter Vincze | 1.80 m (5 ft 11 in) | 85 kg (187 lb) | 16 February 1995 (aged 28) | (Romania) Gyergyói HK |
| 62 | F | János Hári – A | 1.75 m (5 ft 9 in) | 77 kg (170 lb) | 3 May 1992 (aged 31) | (Hungary) Fehérvár AV19 |
| 70 | D | Zsombor Garát | 1.85 m (6 ft 1 in) | 90 kg (200 lb) | 27 July 1997 (aged 25) | (Hungary) MAC Budapest |

=== Sweden ===
The roster was announced on 10 May.

Head coach: Sam Hallam

| No. | Pos. | Name | Height | Weight | Birthdate | Team |
|---|---|---|---|---|---|---|
| 2 | D | Christian Folin | 1.91 m (6 ft 3 in) | 96 kg (212 lb) | 9 February 1991 (aged 32) | (Sweden) Frölunda HC |
| 7 | D | Henrik Tömmernes | 1.86 m (6 ft 1 in) | 84 kg (185 lb) | 28 August 1990 (aged 32) | (Switzerland) Genève-Servette HC |
| 12 | D | Patrik Nemeth | 1.92 m (6 ft 4 in) | 98 kg (216 lb) | 8 February 1992 (aged 31) | (United States) Arizona Coyotes |
| 17 | F | Pär Lindholm | 1.90 m (6 ft 3 in) | 90 kg (200 lb) | 5 October 1991 (aged 31) | (Sweden) Skellefteå AIK |
| 18 | F | Dennis Everberg | 1.93 m (6 ft 4 in) | 95 kg (209 lb) | 31 December 1991 (aged 31) | (Sweden) Rögle BK |
| 19 | F | Marcus Sörensen | 1.81 m (5 ft 11 in) | 79 kg (174 lb) | 7 April 1992 (aged 31) | (Switzerland) HC Fribourg-Gottéron |
| 20 | F | André Petersson | 1.80 m (5 ft 11 in) | 88 kg (194 lb) | 11 September 1990 (aged 32) | (Sweden) HV71 |
| 21 | F | Leo Carlsson | 1.91 m (6 ft 3 in) | 90 kg (200 lb) | 26 December 2004 (aged 18) | (Sweden) Örebro HK |
| 23 | F | Lucas Raymond – A | 1.79 m (5 ft 10 in) | 73 kg (161 lb) | 28 March 2002 (aged 21) | (United States) Detroit Red Wings |
| 24 | F | Oscar Lindberg | 1.85 m (6 ft 1 in) | 88 kg (194 lb) | 29 October 1991 (aged 31) | (Switzerland) SC Bern |
| 30 | G | Jesper Wallstedt | 1.91 m (6 ft 3 in) | 97 kg (214 lb) | 14 November 2002 (aged 20) | (United States) Minnesota Wild |
| 31 | G | Lars Johansson | 1.85 m (6 ft 1 in) | 85 kg (187 lb) | 11 July 1987 (aged 35) | (Sweden) Frölunda HC |
| 32 | D | Lukas Bengtsson | 1.78 m (5 ft 10 in) | 83 kg (183 lb) | 14 April 1994 (aged 29) | (Sweden) Växjö Lakers |
| 33 | F | Jakob Silfverberg – C | 1.86 m (6 ft 1 in) | 94 kg (207 lb) | 13 October 1990 (aged 32) | (United States) Anaheim Ducks |
| 35 | G | Jacob Johansson | 1.85 m (6 ft 1 in) | 83 kg (183 lb) | 10 September 1993 (aged 29) | (Sweden) Timrå IK |
| 37 | D | Timothy Liljegren | 1.84 m (6 ft 0 in) | 89 kg (196 lb) | 30 April 1999 (aged 24) | (Canada) Toronto Maple Leafs |
| 38 | D | Rasmus Sandin | 1.80 m (5 ft 11 in) | 85 kg (187 lb) | 7 March 2000 (aged 23) | (United States) Washington Capitals |
| 48 | F | Jonatan Berggren | 1.80 m (5 ft 11 in) | 83 kg (183 lb) | 16 July 2000 (aged 22) | (United States) Detroit Red Wings |
| 49 | F | Fabian Zetterlund | 1.80 m (5 ft 11 in) | 93 kg (205 lb) | 25 August 1999 (aged 23) | (United States) San Jose Sharks |
| 54 | D | Anton Lindholm | 1.81 m (5 ft 11 in) | 90 kg (200 lb) | 29 November 1994 (aged 28) | (Sweden) Leksands IF |
| 59 | F | Linus Johansson | 1.91 m (6 ft 3 in) | 88 kg (194 lb) | 30 November 1992 (aged 30) | (Sweden) Färjestad BK |
| 64 | D | Jonathan Pudas | 1.79 m (5 ft 10 in) | 81 kg (179 lb) | 26 April 1993 (aged 30) | (Sweden) Skellefteå AIK |
| 70 | F | Dennis Rasmussen | 1.91 m (6 ft 3 in) | 92 kg (203 lb) | 3 July 1990 (aged 32) | (Switzerland) HC Davos |
| 91 | F | Carl Grundström | 1.84 m (6 ft 0 in) | 93 kg (205 lb) | 1 December 1997 (aged 25) | (United States) Los Angeles Kings |
| 95 | F | Jacob de la Rose – A | 1.90 m (6 ft 3 in) | 94 kg (207 lb) | 20 May 1995 (aged 27) | (Switzerland) HC Fribourg-Gottéron |
| 98 | F | Alexander Nylander | 1.84 m (6 ft 0 in) | 80 kg (180 lb) | 2 March 1998 (aged 25) | (United States) Pittsburgh Penguins |

=== United States ===
A 22-player roster was announced on 4 May 2023. Rocco Grimaldi was added a day later.

Head coach: David Quinn

| No. | Pos. | Name | Height | Weight | Birthdate | Team |
|---|---|---|---|---|---|---|
| 1 | G | Casey DeSmith | 1.83 m (6 ft 0 in) | 82 kg (181 lb) | 13 August 1991 (aged 31) | (United States) Pittsburgh Penguins |
| 3 | D | Henry Thrun | 1.88 m (6 ft 2 in) | 88 kg (194 lb) | 12 March 2001 (aged 22) | (United States) San Jose Sharks |
| 4 | D | Connor Mackey | 1.88 m (6 ft 2 in) | 89 kg (196 lb) | 12 September 1996 (aged 26) | (United States) Arizona Coyotes |
| 7 | D | Ronnie Attard | 1.93 m (6 ft 4 in) | 94 kg (207 lb) | 20 March 1999 (aged 24) | (United States) Lehigh Valley Phantoms |
| 9 | F | Sammy Walker | 1.78 m (5 ft 10 in) | 79 kg (174 lb) | 7 June 1999 (aged 23) | (United States) Iowa Wild |
| 10 | F | Drew O'Connor | 1.91 m (6 ft 3 in) | 91 kg (201 lb) | 9 June 1998 (aged 24) | (United States) Pittsburgh Penguins |
| 11 | F | Luke Tuch | 1.88 m (6 ft 2 in) | 95 kg (209 lb) | 7 March 2002 (aged 21) | (United States) Boston University Terriers |
| 12 | D | Dylan Samberg | 1.93 m (6 ft 4 in) | 99 kg (218 lb) | 24 January 1999 (aged 24) | (Canada) Winnipeg Jets |
| 13 | F | Nick Bonino – C | 1.85 m (6 ft 1 in) | 88 kg (194 lb) | 20 April 1988 (aged 35) | (United States) Pittsburgh Penguins |
| 15 | D | Scott Perunovich | 1.78 m (5 ft 10 in) | 79 kg (174 lb) | 18 August 1998 (aged 24) | (United States) Springfield Thunderbirds |
| 17 | F | T.J. Tynan | 1.75 m (5 ft 9 in) | 75 kg (165 lb) | 25 February 1992 (aged 31) | (United States) Ontario Reign |
| 19 | F | Cutter Gauthier | 1.88 m (6 ft 2 in) | 88 kg (194 lb) | 19 January 2004 (aged 19) | (United States) Boston College Eagles |
| 20 | D | Lane Hutson | 1.75 m (5 ft 9 in) | 70 kg (150 lb) | 14 February 2004 (aged 19) | (United States) Boston University Terriers |
| 21 | F | Sean Farrell | 1.75 m (5 ft 9 in) | 79 kg (174 lb) | 2 November 2001 (aged 21) | (Canada) Montreal Canadiens |
| 22 | F | Anders Bjork | 1.83 m (6 ft 0 in) | 86 kg (190 lb) | 5 August 1996 (aged 26) | (United States) Chicago Blackhawks |
| 23 | F | Mikey Eyssimont | 1.83 m (6 ft 0 in) | 82 kg (181 lb) | 9 September 1996 (aged 26) | (United States) Tampa Bay Lightning |
| 25 | D | Nick Perbix | 1.88 m (6 ft 2 in) | 87 kg (192 lb) | 15 June 1998 (aged 24) | (United States) Tampa Bay Lightning |
| 27 | F | Matthew Coronato | 1.78 m (5 ft 10 in) | 83 kg (183 lb) | 14 November 2002 (aged 20) | (Canada) Calgary Flames |
| 29 | G | Drew Commesso | 1.88 m (6 ft 2 in) | 82 kg (181 lb) | 19 July 2002 (aged 20) | (United States) Rockford IceHogs |
| 38 | F | Patrick Brown | 1.85 m (6 ft 1 in) | 95 kg (209 lb) | 29 May 1992 (aged 30) | (Canada) Ottawa Senators |
| 40 | G | Cal Petersen | 1.85 m (6 ft 1 in) | 82 kg (181 lb) | 19 October 1994 (aged 28) | (United States) Ontario Reign |
| 43 | D | Tyler Kleven | 1.93 m (6 ft 4 in) | 94 kg (207 lb) | 10 January 2002 (aged 21) | (Canada) Ottawa Senators |
| 56 | F | Rocco Grimaldi | 1.68 m (5 ft 6 in) | 73 kg (161 lb) | 8 February 1993 (aged 30) | (United States) Rockford IceHogs |
| 83 | F | Conor Garland – A | 1.78 m (5 ft 10 in) | 75 kg (165 lb) | 11 March 1996 (aged 27) | (Canada) Vancouver Canucks |
| 89 | F | Alex Tuch – A | 1.93 m (6 ft 4 in) | 99 kg (218 lb) | 10 May 1996 (aged 27) | (United States) Buffalo Sabres |
| 91 | F | Carter Mazur | 1.83 m (6 ft 0 in) | 78 kg (172 lb) | 28 March 2002 (aged 21) | (United States) Grand Rapids Griffins |

== Group B ==
=== Canada ===
A 20-player roster was announced on 5 May 2023.

Head coach: André Tourigny

| No. | Pos. | Name | Height | Weight | Birthdate | Team |
|---|---|---|---|---|---|---|
| 5 | D | Jacob Middleton | 1.99 m (6 ft 6 in) | 99 kg (218 lb) | 2 January 1996 (aged 27) | (United States) Minnesota Wild |
| 7 | D | Pierre-Olivier Joseph | 1.88 m (6 ft 2 in) | 84 kg (185 lb) | 1 July 1999 (aged 23) | (United States) Pittsburgh Penguins |
| 8 | F | Cody Glass | 1.91 m (6 ft 3 in) | 88 kg (194 lb) | 1 April 1999 (aged 24) | (United States) Nashville Predators |
| 11 | F | Jack McBain | 1.93 m (6 ft 4 in) | 96 kg (212 lb) | 6 January 2000 (aged 23) | (United States) Arizona Coyotes |
| 19 | F | Peyton Krebs | 1.85 m (6 ft 1 in) | 84 kg (185 lb) | 26 January 2001 (aged 22) | (United States) Buffalo Sabres |
| 20 | D | Justin Barron | 1.88 m (6 ft 2 in) | 91 kg (201 lb) | 15 November 2001 (aged 21) | (Canada) Montreal Canadiens |
| 21 | F | Scott Laughton | 1.90 m (6 ft 3 in) | 86 kg (190 lb) | 30 May 1994 (aged 28) | (United States) Philadelphia Flyers |
| 22 | F | Jack Quinn | 1.83 m (6 ft 0 in) | 80 kg (180 lb) | 19 September 2001 (aged 21) | (United States) Buffalo Sabres |
| 27 | G | Devon Levi | 1.85 m (6 ft 1 in) | 84 kg (185 lb) | 27 December 2001 (aged 21) | (United States) Buffalo Sabres |
| 30 | G | Joel Hofer | 1.96 m (6 ft 5 in) | 78 kg (172 lb) | 30 July 2000 (aged 22) | (United States) St. Louis Blues |
| 35 | G | Sam Montembeault | 1.91 m (6 ft 3 in) | 90 kg (200 lb) | 30 October 1996 (aged 26) | (Canada) Montreal Canadiens |
| 52 | D | MacKenzie Weegar – A | 1.83 m (6 ft 0 in) | 91 kg (201 lb) | 7 January 1994 (aged 29) | (Canada) Calgary Flames |
| 53 | F | Michael Carcone | 1.75 m (5 ft 9 in) | 77 kg (170 lb) | 19 May 1996 (aged 26) | (United States) Tucson Roadrunners |
| 57 | D | Tyler Myers | 2.03 m (6 ft 8 in) | 104 kg (229 lb) | 1 February 1990 (aged 33) | (Canada) Vancouver Canucks |
| 63 | F | Jake Neighbours | 1.83 m (6 ft 0 in) | 91 kg (201 lb) | 29 March 2002 (aged 21) | (United States) St. Louis Blues |
| 67 | F | Lawson Crouse – A | 1.93 m (6 ft 4 in) | 98 kg (216 lb) | 23 June 1997 (aged 25) | (United States) Arizona Coyotes |
| 73 | F | Tyler Toffoli – C | 1.83 m (6 ft 0 in) | 89 kg (196 lb) | 24 April 1992 (aged 31) | (Canada) Calgary Flames |
| 74 | D | Ethan Bear | 1.82 m (6 ft 0 in) | 89 kg (196 lb) | 26 June 1997 (aged 25) | (Canada) Vancouver Canucks |
| 77 | D | Brad Hunt | 1.75 m (5 ft 9 in) | 80 kg (180 lb) | 24 August 1988 (aged 34) | (United States) Colorado Avalanche |
| 79 | F | Samuel Blais | 1.88 m (6 ft 2 in) | 95 kg (209 lb) | 17 June 1996 (aged 26) | (United States) St. Louis Blues |
| 90 | F | Joe Veleno | 1.86 m (6 ft 1 in) | 93 kg (205 lb) | 13 January 2000 (aged 23) | (United States) Detroit Red Wings |
| 91 | F | Adam Fantilli | 1.88 m (6 ft 2 in) | 88 kg (194 lb) | 12 October 2004 (aged 18) | (United States) Michigan Wolverines |

=== Czechia ===
The roster was announced on 6 May 2023.

Head coach: (Finland) Kari Jalonen

| No. | Pos. | Name | Height | Weight | Birthdate | Team |
|---|---|---|---|---|---|---|
| 3 | D | Ronald Knot | 1.93 m (6 ft 4 in) | 94 kg (207 lb) | 3 August 1994 (aged 28) | (United States) Tucson Roadrunners |
| 6 | D | Michal Kempný | 1.83 m (6 ft 0 in) | 88 kg (194 lb) | 8 September 1990 (aged 32) | (Czech Republic) HC Sparta Praha |
| 7 | D | Tomáš Dvořák | 1.92 m (6 ft 4 in) | 90 kg (200 lb) | 7 June 1995 (aged 27) | (Czech Republic) HC Dynamo Pardubice |
| 8 | F | Ondřej Beránek | 1.84 m (6 ft 0 in) | 88 kg (194 lb) | 21 December 1995 (aged 27) | (Czech Republic) HC Energie Karlovy Vary |
| 10 | F | Roman Červenka – C | 1.82 m (6 ft 0 in) | 89 kg (196 lb) | 10 December 1985 (aged 37) | (Switzerland) SC Rapperswil-Jona Lakers |
| 13 | F | Jiří Smejkal | 1.89 m (6 ft 2 in) | 83 kg (183 lb) | 5 November 1996 (aged 26) | (Canada) Ottawa Senators |
| 14 | F | Filip Chlapík | 1.85 m (6 ft 1 in) | 89 kg (196 lb) | 3 June 1997 (aged 25) | (Switzerland) HC Ambrì-Piotta |
| 18 | F | Dominik Kubalík | 1.87 m (6 ft 2 in) | 86 kg (190 lb) | 21 August 1995 (aged 27) | (United States) Detroit Red Wings |
| 19 | F | Jakub Flek | 1.72 m (5 ft 8 in) | 74 kg (163 lb) | 24 December 1992 (aged 30) | (Czech Republic) HC Kometa Brno |
| 23 | F | Lukáš Sedlák | 1.84 m (6 ft 0 in) | 96 kg (212 lb) | 25 February 1993 (aged 30) | (Czech Republic) HC Dynamo Pardubice |
| 25 | F | Radan Lenc | 1.83 m (6 ft 0 in) | 88 kg (194 lb) | 30 July 1991 (aged 31) | (Sweden) HV71 |
| 30 | G | Šimon Hrubec | 1.86 m (6 ft 1 in) | 87 kg (192 lb) | 30 June 1991 (aged 31) | (Switzerland) ZSC Lions |
| 33 | D | Jan Košťálek | 1.85 m (6 ft 1 in) | 85 kg (187 lb) | 17 February 1995 (aged 28) | (Czech Republic) HC Dynamo Pardubice |
| 47 | D | Michal Jordán – A | 1.85 m (6 ft 1 in) | 90 kg (200 lb) | 17 July 1990 (aged 32) | (Switzerland) SC Rapperswil-Jona Lakers |
| 48 | F | Jiří Černoch | 1.75 m (5 ft 9 in) | 90 kg (200 lb) | 1 September 1996 (aged 26) | (Czech Republic) HC Energie Karlovy Vary |
| 50 | G | Karel Vejmelka | 1.90 m (6 ft 3 in) | 90 kg (200 lb) | 25 May 1996 (aged 26) | (United States) Arizona Coyotes |
| 52 | F | Michael Špaček | 1.80 m (5 ft 11 in) | 85 kg (187 lb) | 9 April 1997 (aged 26) | (Switzerland) HC Ambrì-Piotta |
| 53 | F | Radim Zohorna | 1.98 m (6 ft 6 in) | 104 kg (229 lb) | 29 April 1996 (aged 27) | (Canada) Toronto Marlies |
| 61 | F | Martin Kaut | 1.86 m (6 ft 1 in) | 80 kg (180 lb) | 2 October 1999 (aged 23) | (United States) San Jose Barracuda |
| 67 | D | Jakub Zbořil | 1.85 m (6 ft 1 in) | 84 kg (185 lb) | 21 February 1997 (aged 26) | (United States) Boston Bruins |
| 69 | F | Daniel Voženílek | 1.86 m (6 ft 1 in) | 88 kg (194 lb) | 10 February 1996 (aged 27) | (Czech Republic) HC Oceláři Třinec |
| 71 | F | Vladimír Sobotka – A | 1.80 m (5 ft 11 in) | 89 kg (196 lb) | 2 July 1987 (aged 35) | (Czech Republic) HC Sparta Praha |
| 72 | F | Filip Chytil | 1.84 m (6 ft 0 in) | 81 kg (179 lb) | 5 September 1999 (aged 23) | (United States) New York Rangers |
| 77 | D | David Němeček | 1.94 m (6 ft 4 in) | 94 kg (207 lb) | 29 June 1995 (aged 27) | (Czech Republic) HC Sparta Praha |
| 84 | D | Tomáš Kundrátek | 1.88 m (6 ft 2 in) | 94 kg (207 lb) | 26 December 1989 (aged 33) | (Czech Republic) HC Kometa Brno |
| 94 | G | Marek Langhamer | 1.87 m (6 ft 2 in) | 85 kg (187 lb) | 22 July 1994 (aged 28) | (Finland) Ilves |
| 96 | F | David Tomášek | 1.87 m (6 ft 2 in) | 84 kg (185 lb) | 10 February 1996 (aged 27) | (Czech Republic) HC Sparta Praha |

=== Kazakhstan ===
A 28-player roster was announced on 10 May.

Head coach: Galym Mambetaliyev

| No. | Pos. | Name | Height | Weight | Birthdate | Team |
|---|---|---|---|---|---|---|
| 1 | G | Nikita Boyarkin | 1.90 m (6 ft 3 in) | 96 kg (212 lb) | 7 October 1998 (aged 24) | (Kazakhstan) Barys Astana |
| 10 | F | Nikita Mikhailis – A | 1.75 m (5 ft 9 in) | 70 kg (150 lb) | 18 June 1995 (aged 27) | (Kazakhstan) Barys Astana |
| 13 | F | Dinmukhamed Kaiyrzhan | 1.81 m (5 ft 11 in) | 79 kg (174 lb) | 27 June 2003 (aged 19) | (Kazakhstan) Barys Astana |
| 17 | F | Alikhan Omirbekov | 1.75 m (5 ft 9 in) | 67 kg (148 lb) | 14 June 2001 (aged 21) | (Kazakhstan) Nomad Nur-Sultan |
| 21 | D | Kirill Polokhov | 1.91 m (6 ft 3 in) | 91 kg (201 lb) | 23 March 1998 (aged 25) | (Kazakhstan) Arlan Kokshetau |
| 23 | F | Maxim Mukhametov | 1.82 m (6 ft 0 in) | 80 kg (180 lb) | 30 April 1999 (aged 24) | (Kazakhstan) Nomad Nur-Sultan |
| 25 | D | Danil Butenko | 1.82 m (6 ft 0 in) | 72 kg (159 lb) | 6 September 2001 (aged 21) | (Kazakhstan) Nomad Nur-Sultan |
| 28 | D | Valeri Orekhov | 1.86 m (6 ft 1 in) | 76 kg (168 lb) | 17 July 1999 (aged 23) | (Russia) Admiral Vladivostok |
| 31 | D | Artyom Korolyov | 1.85 m (6 ft 1 in) | 74 kg (163 lb) | 20 September 2001 (aged 21) | (Kazakhstan) Nomad Nur-Sultan |
| 43 | G | Andrei Shutov | 1.89 m (6 ft 2 in) | 83 kg (183 lb) | 4 March 1998 (aged 25) | (Kazakhstan) Barys Astana |
| 48 | F | Roman Starchenko – C | 1.79 m (5 ft 10 in) | 88 kg (194 lb) | 12 May 1986 (aged 37) | (Kazakhstan) Barys Astana |
| 55 | D | Tamirlan Gaitamirov | 1.93 m (6 ft 4 in) | 93 kg (205 lb) | 23 August 2000 (aged 22) | (Kazakhstan) Barys Astana |
| 64 | F | Arkadiy Shestakov | 1.82 m (6 ft 0 in) | 83 kg (183 lb) | 24 March 1995 (aged 28) | (Kazakhstan) Barys Astana |
| 65 | D | Samat Daniyar | 1.83 m (6 ft 0 in) | 73 kg (161 lb) | 24 January 1999 (aged 24) | (Kazakhstan) Barys Astana |
| 71 | D | Madi Dikhanbek | 1.79 m (5 ft 10 in) | 71 kg (157 lb) | 11 January 2001 (aged 22) | (Kazakhstan) Nomad Nur-Sultan |
| 72 | F | Maxim Musorov | 1.82 m (6 ft 0 in) | 84 kg (185 lb) | 29 May 2001 (aged 21) | (Russia) Khimik Voskresensk |
| 73 | G | Maxim Pavlenko | 1.95 m (6 ft 5 in) | 82 kg (181 lb) | 4 June 2002 (aged 20) | (Kazakhstan) Nomad Nur-Sultan |
| 79 | F | Mikhail Rakhmanov | 1.76 m (5 ft 9 in) | 77 kg (170 lb) | 27 May 1992 (aged 30) | (Kazakhstan) Barys Astana |
| 81 | F | Batyrlan Muratov | 1.83 m (6 ft 0 in) | 72 kg (159 lb) | 1 February 1999 (aged 24) | (Kazakhstan) Nomad Nur-Sultan |
| 84 | F | Kirill Savitski | 1.83 m (6 ft 0 in) | 87 kg (192 lb) | 9 March 1996 (aged 27) | (Kazakhstan) Barys Astana |
| 86 | F | Abay Mangisbayev | 1.93 m (6 ft 4 in) | 95 kg (209 lb) | 9 January 2002 (aged 21) | (Kazakhstan) Barys Astana |
| 87 | D | Adil Beketayev | 1.93 m (6 ft 4 in) | 93 kg (205 lb) | 23 April 1998 (aged 25) | (Kazakhstan) Nomad Nur-Sultan |
| 88 | F | Evgeni Rymarev | 1.75 m (5 ft 9 in) | 78 kg (172 lb) | 9 September 1988 (aged 34) | (Russia) AKM Novomoskovsk |
| 92 | F | Dmitri Grents | 1.83 m (6 ft 0 in) | 84 kg (185 lb) | 10 June 1996 (aged 26) | (Kazakhstan) Arlan Kokshetau |
| 96 | F | Alikhan Asetov – A | 1.96 m (6 ft 5 in) | 91 kg (201 lb) | 26 August 1996 (aged 26) | (Kazakhstan) Barys Astana |

=== Latvia ===
The roster was announced on 9 May 2023.

Head coach: Harijs Vītoliņš

| No. | Pos. | Name | Height | Weight | Birthdate | Team |
|---|---|---|---|---|---|---|
| 2 | D | Kārlis Čukste | 1.88 m (6 ft 2 in) | 98 kg (216 lb) | 17 June 1997 (aged 25) | (Czech Republic) HC Oceláři Třinec |
| 9 | F | Renārs Krastenbergs | 1.83 m (6 ft 0 in) | 84 kg (185 lb) | 26 December 1998 (aged 24) | (Sweden) AIK IF |
| 13 | F | Rihards Bukarts | 1.80 m (5 ft 11 in) | 84 kg (185 lb) | 31 December 1995 (aged 27) | (Austria) EC KAC |
| 16 | F | Kaspars Daugaviņš – C | 1.83 m (6 ft 0 in) | 99 kg (218 lb) | 18 May 1988 (aged 34) | (Germany) Iserlohn Roosters |
| 17 | F | Mārtiņš Dzierkals | 1.83 m (6 ft 0 in) | 84 kg (185 lb) | 4 April 1997 (aged 26) | (Czech Republic) Motor České Budějovice |
| 18 | F | Rodrigo Ābols – A | 1.93 m (6 ft 4 in) | 93 kg (205 lb) | 5 January 1996 (aged 27) | (Sweden) Örebro HK |
| 21 | F | Rūdolfs Balcers | 1.80 m (5 ft 11 in) | 79 kg (174 lb) | 8 April 1997 (aged 26) | (United States) Syracuse Crunch |
| 22 | F | Toms Andersons | 1.85 m (6 ft 1 in) | 86 kg (190 lb) | 25 November 1993 (aged 29) | (Switzerland) HC La Chaux-de-Fonds |
| 25 | F | Andris Džeriņš | 1.86 m (6 ft 1 in) | 87 kg (192 lb) | 14 February 1988 (aged 35) | (Denmark) Herning Blue Fox |
| 26 | D | Uvis Balinskis | 1.83 m (6 ft 0 in) | 85 kg (187 lb) | 1 August 1996 (aged 26) | (Czech Republic) HC Bílí Tygři Liberec |
| 27 | D | Oskars Cibuļskis | 1.88 m (6 ft 2 in) | 96 kg (212 lb) | 9 April 1988 (aged 35) | (Czech Republic) Rytíři Kladno |
| 29 | D | Ralfs Freibergs | 1.81 m (5 ft 11 in) | 84 kg (185 lb) | 17 May 1991 (aged 31) | (Czech Republic) HC Litvínov |
| 31 | G | Artūrs Šilovs | 1.93 m (6 ft 4 in) | 88 kg (194 lb) | 22 March 2001 (aged 22) | (Canada) Abbotsford Canucks |
| 39 | F | Georgs Golovkovs | 1.81 m (5 ft 11 in) | 79 kg (174 lb) | 12 July 1995 (aged 27) | (Sweden) Södertälje SK |
| 50 | G | Kristers Gudļevskis | 1.92 m (6 ft 4 in) | 97 kg (214 lb) | 31 July 1992 (aged 30) | (Sweden) Modo Hockey |
| 55 | D | Roberts Mamčics | 1.96 m (6 ft 5 in) | 105 kg (231 lb) | 6 April 1995 (aged 28) | (Slovakia) HC Nové Zámky |
| 65 | D | Arvils Bergmanis | 1.81 m (5 ft 11 in) | 79 kg (174 lb) | 29 December 1999 (aged 23) | (United States) Alaska Nanooks |
| 70 | F | Miks Indrašis | 1.93 m (6 ft 4 in) | 89 kg (196 lb) | 30 September 1990 (aged 32) | (Germany) Schwenninger Wild Wings |
| 71 | F | Roberts Bukarts – A | 1.82 m (6 ft 0 in) | 84 kg (185 lb) | 27 June 1990 (aged 32) | (Czech Republic) HC Vítkovice Ridera |
| 72 | D | Jānis Jaks | 1.83 m (6 ft 0 in) | 86 kg (190 lb) | 22 August 1995 (aged 27) | (Czech Republic) HC Litvínov |
| 73 | F | Deniss Smirnovs | 1.77 m (5 ft 10 in) | 80 kg (180 lb) | 7 March 1999 (aged 24) | (Switzerland) Genève-Servette HC |
| 74 | G | Ivars Punnenovs | 1.85 m (6 ft 1 in) | 91 kg (201 lb) | 30 May 1994 (aged 28) | (Switzerland) SCL Tigers |
| 77 | D | Kristaps Zīle | 1.85 m (6 ft 1 in) | 86 kg (190 lb) | 24 December 1997 (aged 25) | (Czech Republic) HC Litvínov |
| 85 | F | Dans Ločmelis | 1.84 m (6 ft 0 in) | 77 kg (170 lb) | 21 January 2004 (aged 19) | (Sweden) Luleå HF |
| 91 | F | Ronalds Ķēniņš | 1.82 m (6 ft 0 in) | 91 kg (201 lb) | 28 February 1991 (aged 32) | (Switzerland) Lausanne HC |
| 94 | D | Kristiāns Rubīns | 1.94 m (6 ft 4 in) | 96 kg (212 lb) | 11 December 1997 (aged 25) | (Canada) Calgary Wranglers |
| 95 | F | Oskars Batņa | 1.95 m (6 ft 5 in) | 106 kg (234 lb) | 7 May 1995 (aged 28) | (Finland) Mikkelin Jukurit |

=== Norway ===
The roster was announced on 7 May.

Head coach: Tobias Johansson

| No. | Pos. | Name | Height | Weight | Birthdate | Team |
|---|---|---|---|---|---|---|
| 2 | D | Isak Hansen | 1.88 m (6 ft 2 in) | 95 kg (209 lb) | 2 October 2003 (aged 19) | (Sweden) Leksands IF |
| 4 | D | Johannes Johannesen – A | 1.81 m (5 ft 11 in) | 85 kg (187 lb) | 1 March 1997 (aged 26) | (Sweden) Västerviks IK |
| 8 | F | Mathias Trettenes – A | 1.80 m (5 ft 11 in) | 82 kg (181 lb) | 8 November 1993 (aged 29) | (Finland) HPK |
| 10 | D | Mattias Nørstebø | 1.78 m (5 ft 10 in) | 82 kg (181 lb) | 3 June 1995 (aged 27) | (Sweden) IF Björklöven |
| 12 | F | Noah Steen | 1.83 m (6 ft 0 in) | 85 kg (187 lb) | 16 August 2004 (aged 18) | (Sweden) Mora IK |
| 13 | F | Sondre Olden | 1.94 m (6 ft 4 in) | 87 kg (192 lb) | 29 August 1992 (aged 30) | (Switzerland) HC La Chaux-de-Fonds |
| 16 | D | Ole Einar Engeland Andersen | 1.81 m (5 ft 11 in) | 83 kg (183 lb) | 10 March 1999 (aged 24) | (Norway) Stjernen Hockey |
| 17 | F | Eirik Salsten | 1.84 m (6 ft 0 in) | 88 kg (194 lb) | 17 June 1994 (aged 28) | (Norway) Storhamar Hockey |
| 18 | F | Thomas Olsen | 1.86 m (6 ft 1 in) | 90 kg (200 lb) | 25 June 1995 (aged 27) | (Norway) Vålerenga Ishockey |
| 19 | F | Håvard Salsten | 1.87 m (6 ft 2 in) | 88 kg (194 lb) | 19 August 2000 (aged 22) | (Norway) Sparta Sarpsborg |
| 20 | F | Ludvig Hoff | 1.80 m (5 ft 11 in) | 85 kg (187 lb) | 16 October 1996 (aged 26) | (Norway) Stavanger Oilers |
| 23 | F | Thomas Berg-Paulsen | 1.86 m (6 ft 1 in) | 84 kg (185 lb) | 6 August 1999 (aged 23) | (Norway) Stavanger Oilers |
| 24 | F | Ole Julian Holm | 1.92 m (6 ft 4 in) | 92 kg (203 lb) | 23 May 2002 (aged 20) | (United States) Cleveland Monsters |
| 27 | F | Andreas Martinsen | 1.90 m (6 ft 3 in) | 100 kg (220 lb) | 13 June 1990 (aged 32) | (Norway) Vålerenga Ishockey |
| 30 | G | Tobias Normann | 1.84 m (6 ft 0 in) | 88 kg (194 lb) | 3 August 2001 (aged 21) | (Norway) Sparta Sarpsborg |
| 31 | G | Jonas Arntzen | 1.91 m (6 ft 3 in) | 85 kg (187 lb) | 21 November 1997 (aged 25) | (Sweden) Örebro HK |
| 33 | G | Henrik Haukeland | 1.88 m (6 ft 2 in) | 93 kg (205 lb) | 6 December 1994 (aged 28) | (Germany) Düsseldorfer EG |
| 37 | F | Markus Vikingstad | 1.93 m (6 ft 4 in) | 93 kg (205 lb) | 27 September 1999 (aged 23) | (Germany) Fischtown Pinguins |
| 40 | F | Ken André Olimb – C | 1.79 m (5 ft 10 in) | 81 kg (179 lb) | 21 January 1989 (aged 34) | (Germany) Schwenninger Wild Wings |
| 42 | F | Petter Vesterheim | 1.81 m (5 ft 11 in) | 77 kg (170 lb) | 30 September 2004 (aged 18) | (Sweden) Mora IK |
| 43 | D | Max Krogdahl | 1.88 m (6 ft 2 in) | 93 kg (205 lb) | 21 October 1998 (aged 24) | (Sweden) Västerviks IK |
| 49 | D | Christian Kåsastul | 1.76 m (5 ft 9 in) | 86 kg (190 lb) | 9 April 1997 (aged 26) | (Finland) HIFK Hockey |
| 76 | D | Emil Lilleberg | 1.88 m (6 ft 2 in) | 94 kg (207 lb) | 2 February 2001 (aged 22) | (Sweden) IK Oskarshamn |
| 85 | F | Michael Haga | 1.80 m (5 ft 11 in) | 80 kg (180 lb) | 10 March 1992 (aged 31) | (Austria) Steinbach Black Wings Linz |
| 86 | F | Philip Granath | 1.70 m (5 ft 7 in) | 72 kg (159 lb) | 5 October 2002 (aged 20) | (Finland) Tappara |

=== Slovakia ===
The roster was announced on 6 May.

Head coach: (Canada) Craig Ramsay

| No. | Pos. | Name | Height | Weight | Birthdate | Team |
|---|---|---|---|---|---|---|
| 3 | D | Adam Jánošík | 1.80 m (5 ft 11 in) | 85 kg (187 lb) | 7 September 1992 (aged 30) | (Czech Republic) BK Mladá Boleslav |
| 5 | D | Šimon Nemec | 1.85 m (6 ft 1 in) | 92 kg (203 lb) | 15 February 2004 (aged 19) | (United States) Utica Comets |
| 7 | D | Mário Grman | 1.86 m (6 ft 1 in) | 89 kg (196 lb) | 11 April 1997 (aged 26) | (Czech Republic) HC Vítkovice Ridera |
| 8 | F | Martin Chromiak | 1.83 m (6 ft 0 in) | 91 kg (201 lb) | 20 August 2002 (aged 20) | (United States) Ontario Reign |
| 12 | F | Oliver Okuliar | 1.85 m (6 ft 1 in) | 84 kg (185 lb) | 24 May 2000 (aged 22) | (Czech Republic) Mountfield HK |
| 13 | D | František Gajdoš | 1.83 m (6 ft 0 in) | 83 kg (183 lb) | 7 June 2001 (aged 21) | (Slovakia) HK Nitra |
| 16 | F | Róbert Lantoši | 1.80 m (5 ft 11 in) | 84 kg (185 lb) | 24 September 1995 (aged 27) | (Czech Republic) BK Mladá Boleslav |
| 17 | F | Andrej Kudrna | 1.89 m (6 ft 2 in) | 95 kg (209 lb) | 11 May 1991 (aged 32) | (Czech Republic) HC Litvínov |
| 21 | F | Miloš Kelemen | 1.88 m (6 ft 2 in) | 99 kg (218 lb) | 6 July 1999 (aged 23) | (United States) Tucson Roadrunners |
| 22 | D | Samuel Kňažko | 1.86 m (6 ft 1 in) | 86 kg (190 lb) | 7 August 2002 (aged 20) | (United States) Cleveland Monsters |
| 25 | F | Alex Tamáši | 1.84 m (6 ft 0 in) | 90 kg (200 lb) | 25 March 1998 (aged 25) | (Slovakia) HC '05 Banská Bystrica |
| 27 | F | Marek Hrivík – C | 1.85 m (6 ft 1 in) | 89 kg (196 lb) | 28 August 1991 (aged 31) | (Sweden) Leksands IF |
| 28 | F | Richard Pánik | 1.88 m (6 ft 2 in) | 92 kg (203 lb) | 7 February 1991 (aged 32) | (Switzerland) Lausanne HC |
| 29 | D | Michal Ivan | 1.85 m (6 ft 1 in) | 85 kg (187 lb) | 18 November 1999 (aged 23) | (Czech Republic) HC Bílí Tygři Liberec |
| 31 | G | Samuel Hlavaj | 1.93 m (6 ft 4 in) | 99 kg (218 lb) | 29 May 2001 (aged 21) | (Slovakia) HC Slovan Bratislava |
| 33 | G | Stanislav Škorvánek | 1.87 m (6 ft 2 in) | 87 kg (192 lb) | 31 January 1996 (aged 27) | (Slovakia) HK Dukla Michalovce |
| 34 | F | Peter Cehlárik – A | 1.88 m (6 ft 2 in) | 94 kg (207 lb) | 2 August 1995 (aged 27) | (Sweden) Leksands IF |
| 35 | G | Dominik Riečický | 1.85 m (6 ft 1 in) | 80 kg (180 lb) | 9 June 1992 (aged 30) | (Slovakia) HC Košice |
| 44 | D | Mislav Rosandić | 1.81 m (5 ft 11 in) | 85 kg (187 lb) | 26 January 1995 (aged 28) | (Czech Republic) Mountfield HK |
| 47 | F | Mário Lunter | 1.82 m (6 ft 0 in) | 90 kg (200 lb) | 20 June 1994 (aged 28) | (Czech Republic) BK Mladá Boleslav |
| 48 | F | Viliam Čacho | 1.83 m (6 ft 0 in) | 82 kg (181 lb) | 14 October 1998 (aged 24) | (Slovakia) HK Dukla Trenčín |
| 64 | D | Patrik Koch | 1.86 m (6 ft 1 in) | 86 kg (190 lb) | 8 December 1996 (aged 26) | (Czech Republic) HC Vítkovice Ridera |
| 79 | F | Libor Hudáček | 1.77 m (5 ft 10 in) | 80 kg (180 lb) | 7 September 1990 (aged 32) | (Czech Republic) HC Oceláři Třinec |
| 87 | F | Pavol Regenda | 1.92 m (6 ft 4 in) | 99 kg (218 lb) | 7 December 1999 (aged 23) | (United States) San Diego Gulls |
| 91 | F | Matúš Sukeľ – A | 1.76 m (5 ft 9 in) | 77 kg (170 lb) | 23 January 1996 (aged 27) | (Czech Republic) HC Litvínov |

=== Slovenia ===
The roster was announced on 4 May.

Head coach: Matjaž Kopitar

| No. | Pos. | Name | Height | Weight | Birthdate | Team |
|---|---|---|---|---|---|---|
| 4 | D | Aleksandar Magovac | 1.81 m (5 ft 11 in) | 88 kg (194 lb) | 9 February 1991 (aged 32) | (Slovenia) HK Olimpija |
| 6 | D | Miha Štebih | 1.90 m (6 ft 3 in) | 92 kg (203 lb) | 7 April 1992 (aged 31) | (France) Nice hockey Côte d'Azur |
| 8 | F | Žiga Jeglič | 1.85 m (6 ft 1 in) | 80 kg (180 lb) | 24 February 1988 (aged 35) | (Germany) Fischtown Pinguins |
| 12 | F | Ni Simšič | 1.82 m (6 ft 0 in) | 90 kg (200 lb) | 12 March 1997 (aged 26) | (Slovenia) HK Olimpija |
| 14 | D | Matic Podlipnik | 1.81 m (5 ft 11 in) | 83 kg (183 lb) | 9 August 1992 (aged 30) | (Germany) Fischtown Pinguins |
| 15 | D | Blaž Gregorc | 1.90 m (6 ft 3 in) | 95 kg (209 lb) | 18 January 1990 (aged 33) | (Germany) Augsburger Panther |
| 17 | D | Žiga Pavlin – A | 1.93 m (6 ft 4 in) | 97 kg (214 lb) | 30 April 1985 (aged 38) | (Italy) HC Pustertal Wölfe |
| 18 | F | Ken Ograjenšek | 1.77 m (5 ft 10 in) | 75 kg (165 lb) | 30 August 1991 (aged 31) | (Austria) Graz 99ers |
| 19 | F | Žiga Pance | 1.85 m (6 ft 1 in) | 89 kg (196 lb) | 1 January 1989 (aged 34) | (Slovenia) HK Olimpija |
| 21 | F | Jan Drozg | 1.85 m (6 ft 1 in) | 82 kg (181 lb) | 1 April 1999 (aged 24) | (Russia) Amur Khabarovsk |
| 24 | F | Rok Tičar – A | 1.80 m (5 ft 11 in) | 82 kg (181 lb) | 3 May 1989 (aged 34) | (Austria) EC KAC |
| 26 | F | Jan Urbas – C | 1.92 m (6 ft 4 in) | 98 kg (216 lb) | 26 January 1989 (aged 34) | (Germany) Fischtown Pinguins |
| 32 | G | Gašper Krošelj | 1.88 m (6 ft 2 in) | 86 kg (190 lb) | 9 February 1987 (aged 36) | (Czech Republic) BK Mladá Boleslav |
| 33 | G | Žan Us | 1.81 m (5 ft 11 in) | 78 kg (172 lb) | 10 June 1996 (aged 26) | (Slovenia) HK Olimpija |
| 35 | G | Luka Gračnar | 1.78 m (5 ft 10 in) | 83 kg (183 lb) | 31 October 1993 (aged 29) | (Germany) EV Landshut |
| 44 | D | Aljoša Crnovič | 1.91 m (6 ft 3 in) | 85 kg (187 lb) | 16 April 1999 (aged 24) | (Slovenia) HK Olimpija |
| 45 | F | Luka Maver | 1.90 m (6 ft 3 in) | 87 kg (192 lb) | 25 October 1997 (aged 25) | (Austria) Pioneers Vorarlberg |
| 55 | F | Robert Sabolič | 1.83 m (6 ft 0 in) | 90 kg (200 lb) | 18 September 1988 (aged 34) | (Austria) EC VSV |
| 76 | D | Kristjan Čepon | 1.95 m (6 ft 5 in) | 100 kg (220 lb) | 12 November 1995 (aged 27) | (Slovenia) HK Olimpija |
| 81 | F | Tadej Čimžar | 1.85 m (6 ft 1 in) | 80 kg (180 lb) | 21 April 1992 (aged 31) | (Slovenia) HK Olimpija |
| 88 | F | Miha Zajc | 1.88 m (6 ft 2 in) | 90 kg (200 lb) | 8 December 1996 (aged 26) | (Slovenia) HK Olimpija |
| 91 | F | Miha Verlič | 1.94 m (6 ft 4 in) | 85 kg (187 lb) | 21 August 1991 (aged 31) | (Germany) Fischtown Pinguins |
| 92 | F | Anže Kuralt | 1.75 m (5 ft 9 in) | 80 kg (180 lb) | 31 October 1991 (aged 31) | (Hungary) Fehérvár AV19 |
| 96 | D | Bine Mašič | 1.78 m (5 ft 10 in) | 75 kg (165 lb) | 14 November 2002 (aged 20) | (Finland) Vaasan Sport |
| 98 | F | Blaž Tomaževič | 1.80 m (5 ft 11 in) | 75 kg (165 lb) | 14 October 1997 (aged 25) | (Austria) EC VSV |

=== Switzerland ===
The roster was announced on 9 May.

Head coach: Patrick Fischer

| No. | Pos. | Name | Height | Weight | Birthdate | Team |
|---|---|---|---|---|---|---|
| 9 | F | Damien Riat | 1.83 m (6 ft 0 in) | 85 kg (187 lb) | 26 February 1997 (aged 26) | (Switzerland) Lausanne HC |
| 10 | F | Andres Ambühl – A | 1.76 m (5 ft 9 in) | 86 kg (190 lb) | 14 September 1983 (aged 39) | (Switzerland) HC Davos |
| 11 | F | Sven Senteler | 1.85 m (6 ft 1 in) | 88 kg (194 lb) | 11 August 1992 (aged 30) | (Switzerland) EV Zug |
| 13 | F | Nico Hischier | 1.86 m (6 ft 1 in) | 79 kg (174 lb) | 4 January 1999 (aged 24) | (United States) New Jersey Devils |
| 14 | D | Dean Kukan | 1.87 m (6 ft 2 in) | 87 kg (192 lb) | 8 July 1993 (aged 29) | (Switzerland) ZSC Lions |
| 21 | F | Kevin Fiala | 1.78 m (5 ft 10 in) | 93 kg (205 lb) | 22 July 1996 (aged 26) | (United States) Los Angeles Kings |
| 22 | F | Nino Niederreiter – C | 1.88 m (6 ft 2 in) | 99 kg (218 lb) | 8 September 1992 (aged 30) | (Canada) Winnipeg Jets |
| 24 | D | Tobias Geisser | 1.96 m (6 ft 5 in) | 100 kg (220 lb) | 13 February 1999 (aged 24) | (Switzerland) EV Zug |
| 29 | G | Robert Mayer | 1.86 m (6 ft 1 in) | 91 kg (201 lb) | 9 October 1989 (aged 33) | (Switzerland) Genève-Servette HC |
| 36 | G | Joren van Pottelberghe | 1.89 m (6 ft 2 in) | 88 kg (194 lb) | 5 June 1997 (aged 25) | (Switzerland) EHC Biel |
| 43 | D | Andrea Glauser | 1.82 m (6 ft 0 in) | 86 kg (190 lb) | 3 April 1996 (aged 27) | (Switzerland) Lausanne HC |
| 45 | D | Michael Fora | 1.92 m (6 ft 4 in) | 98 kg (216 lb) | 30 October 1995 (aged 27) | (Switzerland) HC Davos |
| 54 | D | Christian Marti – A | 1.90 m (6 ft 3 in) | 96 kg (212 lb) | 29 March 1993 (aged 30) | (Switzerland) ZSC Lions |
| 55 | D | Romain Loeffel | 1.78 m (5 ft 10 in) | 85 kg (187 lb) | 10 March 1991 (aged 32) | (Switzerland) SC Bern |
| 59 | F | Dario Simion | 1.88 m (6 ft 2 in) | 88 kg (194 lb) | 22 May 1994 (aged 28) | (Switzerland) EV Zug |
| 62 | F | Denis Malgin | 1.75 m (5 ft 9 in) | 80 kg (180 lb) | 18 January 1997 (aged 26) | (United States) Colorado Avalanche |
| 63 | G | Leonardo Genoni | 1.83 m (6 ft 0 in) | 83 kg (183 lb) | 28 August 1987 (aged 35) | (Switzerland) EV Zug |
| 68 | F | Fabrice Herzog | 1.90 m (6 ft 3 in) | 90 kg (200 lb) | 9 December 1994 (aged 28) | (Switzerland) EV Zug |
| 70 | F | Enzo Corvi | 1.83 m (6 ft 0 in) | 86 kg (190 lb) | 23 December 1992 (aged 30) | (Switzerland) HC Davos |
| 71 | F | Tanner Richard | 1.82 m (6 ft 0 in) | 89 kg (196 lb) | 6 April 1993 (aged 30) | (Switzerland) Genève-Servette HC |
| 79 | F | Calvin Thürkauf | 1.88 m (6 ft 2 in) | 96 kg (212 lb) | 27 June 1997 (aged 25) | (Switzerland) HC Lugano |
| 86 | D | J.J. Moser | 1.85 m (6 ft 1 in) | 83 kg (183 lb) | 6 June 2000 (aged 22) | (United States) Arizona Coyotes |
| 88 | F | Christoph Bertschy | 1.77 m (5 ft 10 in) | 84 kg (185 lb) | 5 April 1994 (aged 29) | (Switzerland) HC Fribourg-Gottéron |
| 92 | F | Gaëtan Haas | 1.83 m (6 ft 0 in) | 82 kg (181 lb) | 31 January 1992 (aged 31) | (Switzerland) EHC Biel |
| 97 | D | Jonas Siegenthaler | 1.89 m (6 ft 2 in) | 99 kg (218 lb) | 6 May 1997 (aged 26) | (United States) New Jersey Devils |
| 98 | F | Marco Miranda | 1.90 m (6 ft 3 in) | 94 kg (207 lb) | 2 June 1998 (aged 24) | (Switzerland) Genève-Servette HC |
