= Evi Lanig =

German alpine skier

Personal information
- Nationality: German
- Born: 24 October 1933 (age 91); Bad Hindelang, Germany

Sport
- Sport: Alpine skiing

Evi Lanig (born 24 October 1933) is a German former alpine skier. She competed in two events at the 1952 Winter Olympics. Lanig was also the German downhill champion in 1953, 1954 and 1955, and she was also the apline and giant slalom national champion.
