= Peppi Schwaiger =

German alpine skier (1930–2014)

Peppi Schwaiger (11 September 1930 – 22 April 2014) was a German alpine skier who competed in the 1952 Winter Olympics and in the 1956 Winter Olympics.
