= Marianne Seltsam =

German alpine skier (1932–2014)

Marianne Seltsam (16 May 1932 – 6 February 2014) was a German alpine skier who competed in the 1952 Winter Olympics and in the 1956 Winter Olympics.
