= Beni Obermüller =

German alpine skier (1930–2005)

Beni Obermüller (11 April 1930 – 10 May 2005) was a German alpine skier who competed in the 1952 Winter Olympics and in the 1956 Winter Olympics.
