= Fritz Poitsch =

German ice hockey player

Personal information
- Nationality: German
- Born: 15 October 1926; Füssen, Germany
- Died: 23 January 1999 (aged 72); Bad Aibling, Germany

Sport
- Sport: Ice hockey

Friedrich Poitsch (15 October 1926 – 23 January 1999) was a German ice hockey player. He competed in the men's tournament at the 1952 Winter Olympics.
