= Karl Enzler =

German ice hockey player (1925–1995)

Personal information
- Full name: Karl-Heinz Enzler
- Nationality: German
- Born: 29 March 1925 Munich, Germany
- Died: 22 February 1995 (aged 69) Fürstenfeldbruck, Germany

Sport
- Sport: Ice hockey

Karl-Heinz Enzler (29 March 1925 – 22 February 1995) was a German ice hockey player. He competed in the men's tournament at the 1952 Winter Olympics. Enzler died in Fürstenfeldbruck on 22 February 1995, at the age of 69.
