= Walter Kremershof =

German ice hockey player

Personal information
- Nationality: German
- Born: 3 December 1922; Krefeld, Germany
- Died: 17 September 1997 (aged 74); Krefeld, Germany

Sport
- Sport: Ice hockey

Walter Kremershof (3 December 1922 – 17 September 1997) was a German ice hockey player. He competed in the men's tournament at the 1952 Winter Olympics.
