= Georg Guggemos =

German ice hockey player

Personal information
- Nationality: German
- Born: 9 January 1927; Füssen, Germany
- Died: 28 January 2015 (aged 88); Füssen, Germany

Sport
- Sport: Ice hockey

Georg Guggemos (9 January 1927 – 28 January 2015) was a German ice hockey player. He competed in the men's tournament at the 1952 Winter Olympics.
