= Dieter Niess =

German ice hockey player

Personal information
- Nationality: German
- Born: 19 March 1926; Rastenburg, East Prussia, Germany (currently Kętrzyn, Poland)
- Died: May 18, 2008 (aged 82)

Sport
- Sport: Ice hockey

Heinz-Dietrich Niess (b. 19 March 1926 - d. 18 May 2008) was a German ice hockey player. He competed in the men's tournament at the 1952 Winter Olympics.
