= Markus Egen =

German ice hockey player (1927–2021)

Markus Egen (14 September 1927 – 28 May 2021) was a German ice hockey player who competed in the 1952 Winter Olympics, in the 1956 Winter Olympics, and in the 1960 Winter Olympics. He was born in Füssen.
