= Alfred Hoffmann =

German ice hockey player

- Born: 20 December 1914; Berlin, German Empire
- Died: July 4, 1983 (aged 68); Garmisch-Partenkirchen, West Germany
- Position: Goaltender
- Caught: Left
- National team: Germany
- Playing career: 1934–1956

Alfred Günter Rudi Hoffmann (20 December 1914 – 4 July 1983) was a German ice hockey player. He competed in the men's tournaments at the 1952 Winter Olympics and the 1956 Winter Olympics.
