= Karl Bierschel =

German ice hockey player (1932–2019)

- Born: 1 March 1932; Krefeld, Germany
- Died: 21 November 2019 (aged 87)
- Position: Defence
- National team: Germany
- Playing career: 1948–1963

Karl Bierschel (1 March 1932 — 21 November 2019) was a German ice hockey player. He represented Germany in the 1952 Winter Olympics and 1956 Winter Olympics. He played from 1950-62 for Krefelder EV. In 1952 Krefeld won the German Championship, beating SC Riessersee 6-4 in the final at Mannheim. Bierschel played for the German team at the 1952 Oslo and the 1956 Cortina d'Ampezzo Winter Olympics placing eighth and sixth respectively. He was later inducted into the German Ice Hockey Hall of Fame. By profession, he was a butcher with his own business in Krefeld.
