= Soviet Union at the 1956 Winter Olympics =

- Flag of the Soviet Union
- IOC code: URS
- NOC: Soviet Olympic Committee

in Cortina d'Ampezzo
- Competitors: 53 (47 men, 6 women) in 6 sports
- Flag bearer: Oleg Goncharenko
- Medals Ranked 1st: Gold 7 Silver 3 Bronze 6 Total 16

Winter Olympics appearances (overview)
- 1956; 1960; 1964; 1968; 1972; 1976; 1980; 1984; 1988

Other related appearances
- Latvia (1924–1936, 1992–pres.); Estonia (1928–1936, 1992–pres.); Lithuania (1928, 1992–pres.); Unified Team (1992); Armenia (1994–pres.); Belarus (1994–pres.); Georgia (1994–pres.); Kazakhstan (1994–pres.); Kyrgyzstan (1994–pres.); Moldova (1994–pres.); Russia (1994–2014); Ukraine (1994–pres.); Uzbekistan (1994–pres.); Azerbaijan (1998–pres.); Tajikistan (2002–pres.); Olympic Athletes from Russia (2018); ROC (2022); Individual Neutral Athletes (2026)

The Soviet Union (USSR) competed in the Winter Olympic Games for the first time at the 1956 Winter Olympics in Cortina d'Ampezzo, Italy.

The Soviet Olympians participated in six out of 8 sports disciplines except for bobsleigh and ice figure skating. The Soviet Union Olympic team consisted of 53 athletes and represented 11 cities from 4 union republics. The team was awarded 16 medals (7 gold, 3 silver, and 6 bronze) and placed first among all participating nations in the medal table. The closest runner-up, Austria, was awarded 11 medals.

Pavel Kolchin became the first Soviet athlete to be awarded a medal at the Winter Olympics. The first Soviet gold medal was awarded to Lyubov Kozyreva, and later the same day, another gold was awarded to Yevgeny Grishin.

== Medalists ==
Medal	Name	Sport	Event
Gold	Nikolay Anikin, Pavel Kolchin; Vladimir Kuzin, Fyodor Terentyev	Cross-country	Men's relay 4 x 10 km
Gold	Lyubov Kozyreva	Cross-country	Women's 10 km
Gold	Yevgeny Babich, Vsevolod Bobrov; Alexei Guryshev, Nikolay Khlystov; Yuri Krylov, Alfred Kuchevsky; Valentin Kuzin, Grigory Mkrtychan; Viktor Nikiforov, Yuri Pantyukhov; Nikolai Puchkov, Viktor Shuvalov; Genrikh Sidorenkov, Nikolai Sologubov; Ivan Tregubov, Dmitry Ukolov; Aleksandr Uvarov	Ice hockey	Men's team
Gold	Yevgeny Grishin	Speed skating	Men's 500 m
Gold	Yevgeny Grishin	Speed skating	Men's 1500 m
Gold	Yuri Mikhaylov	Speed skating	Men's 1500 m
Gold	Boris Shilkov	Speed skating	Men's 5000 m
Silver	Radya Yeroshina	Cross-country	Women's 10 km
Silver	Alevtina Kolchina, Lyubov Kozyreva; Radya Yeroshina	Cross-country	Women's relay 3 x 5 km
Silver	Rafayel Grach	Speed skating	Men's 500 m
Bronze	Yevgeniya Sidorova	Alpine skiing	Women's slalom
Bronze	Pavel Kolchin	Cross-country	Men's 15 km
Bronze	Pavel Kolchin	Cross-country	Men's 30 km
Bronze	Fyodor Terentyev	Cross-country	Men's 50 km
Bronze	Oleg Goncharenko	Speed skating	Men's 5000 m
Bronze	Oleg Goncharenko	Speed skating	Men's 10000 m

== Alpine skiing ==
Men

Athlete	Event	Final			
Athlete	Event	Run 1	Run 2	Total	Rank
Gennady Chertishchev	Giant slalom			3:48.9	55
Gennady Chertishchev	Downhill			DSQ	DNF
Aleksandr Filatov	Giant slalom			3:27.8	33
Aleksandr Filatov	Slalom	1:33.5	2:36.0	4:09.5	30
Aleksandr Filatov	Downhill			3:16.6	16
Vyacheslav Melnikov	Slalom	TNK	DSQ	did not finish	
Yury Sharkov	Giant slalom			3:41.8	46
Yury Sharkov	Slalom	DSQ		did not finish	
Sergey Shustov	Downhill			DSQ	DNF
Viktor Talyanov	Giant slalom			3:45.2	52
Viktor Talyanov	Slalom	1:49.2	2:06.9	3:56.1	24
Viktor Talyanov	Downhill			3:26.5	21

Women

Athlete	Event	Final			
Athlete	Event	Run 1	Run 2	Total	Rank
Aleksandra Artyomenko	Giant slalom			4:04.5	44
Aleksandra Artyomenko	Slalom	DSQ		did not finish	
Aleksandra Artyomenko	Downhill			1:51.1	14
Yevgeniya Sidorova	Giant slalom			2:31.3	40
Yevgeniya Sidorova	Slalom	56.9	59.8	1:56.7	3rd place, bronze medalist(s)
Yevgeniya Sidorova	Downhill			1:59.8	37

== Cross-country skiing ==
Men

Athlete	Event	Final	
Athlete	Event	Total	Rank
Nikolay Anikin	15 km	50:58	7
Viktor Baranov	50 km	3:03:55	7
Minnevali Galiyev	15 km	52:49	18
Pavel Kolchin	15 km	50:17	3rd place, bronze medalist(s)
Pavel Kolchin	30 km	1:45:45	3rd place, bronze medalist(s)
Pavel Kolchin	50 km	2:58:00	6
Vladimir Kuzin	15 km	51:36	10
Vladimir Kuzin	30 km	1:46:09	5
Anatoly Shelyukhin	30 km	1:45:46	4
Anatoly Shelyukhin	50 km	2:56:40	5
Fyodor Terentyev	30 km	1:46:43	6
Fyodor Terentyev	50 km	2:53:32	3rd place, bronze medalist(s)
Fyodor Terentyev; Pavel Kolchin; Nikolay Anikin; Vladimir Kuzin	Relay 4 x 10 km	2:15:30	1st place, gold medalist(s)

Women

Athlete	Event	Final	
Athlete	Event	Total	Rank
Anna Kaaleste	10 km	40:29	9
Alevtina Kolchina	10 km	38:46	4
Lyubov Kozyreva	10 km	38:11	1st place, gold medalist(s)
Radya Yeroshina	10 km	38:16	2nd place, silver medalist(s)
Lyubov Kozyreva; Alevtina Kolchina; Radya Yeroshina	Relay 3 x 5 km	1:09:28	2nd place, silver medalist(s)

== Ice hockey ==
Men

- Head coach: (Soviet Union) Arkady Chernyshev

Pos.	No.	Player	Team
GK		Nikolai Puchkov
GK		Grigory Mkrtychan
D		Nikolai Sologubov
D		Dmitry Ukolov
D		Ivan Tregubov
D		Genrikh Sidorenkov
D		Alfred Kuchevsky
F		Yevgeny Babich
F		Viktor Shuvalov
F		Vsevolod Bobrov
F		Yuri Krylov
F		Aleksandr Uvarov
F		Valentin Kuzin
F		Yuri Pantyukhov
F		Alexei Guryshev
F		Nikolay Khlystov
F		Viktor Nikiforov

Preliminary round

Team	GP	W	L	T	GF	GA	PTS
Soviet Union	2	2	0	0	15	4	4
Sweden	2	1	1	0	7	10	2
Switzerland	2	0	2	0	8	16	0

27 January 1956; 21:30	Soviet Union	5–1 (1–1, 2–0, 2–0)	Sweden

Babich (2); Bobrov; Kuzin (2) / Goals / Björn

29 January 1956; 21:30	Soviet Union	10–3 (4–1, 2–0, 4–2)	Switzerland

Ukolov; Tregubov; Bobrov (4); Krylov; Guryshev (2); Peter (own goal) / Goals / Naef (2); Bagnoud

Final round

Team	GP	W	L	T	GF	GA	PTS
Soviet Union	5	5	0	0	25	5	10
United States	5	4	1	0	26	12	8
Canada	5	3	2	0	23	11	6
Sweden	5	1	3	1	10	17	3
Czechoslovakia	5	1	4	0	20	30	2
Germany	5	0	4	1	6	35	1

30 January 1956; 19:00	Soviet Union	4–1 (1–1, 1–0, 2–0)	Sweden

Shuvalov; Bobrov; Guryshev (2) / Goals / Bröms

31 January 1956; 19:00	Soviet Union	8–0 (0–0, 7–0, 1–0)	Germany

Tregubov; Shuvalov; Bobrov; Krylov; Uvarov (2); Guryshev (2) / Goals

2 February 1956; 22:00	Soviet Union	7–4 (2–1, 3–0, 2–3)	Czechoslovakia

Sologubov; Shuvalov (3); Bobrov; Pantyukhov; Guryshev / Goals / Gut; Bubník; Návrat; Pantucek

3 February 1956; 21:30	Soviet Union	4–0 (0–0, 1–0, 3–0)	United States

Bobrov; Kuzin; Pantyukhov; Khlystov / Goals

4 February 1956; 21:30	Soviet Union	2–0 (0–0, 1–0, 1–0)	Canada

Krylov; Kuzin / Goals

Gold

== Nordic combined ==
Athlete	Event	Ski jumping		Cross-country			Total	
Athlete	Event	Points	Rank	Time	Points	Rank	Points	Rank
Leonid Fyodorov	Individual 15 km	201.0	12	59:17	228.500	12	429.500	10
Nikolay Gusakov	Individual 15 km	200.0	14	58:17	232.300	8	432.300	7
Uno Kajak	Individual 15 km	186.5	27	1:00:48	222.600	18	409.100	26
Yury Moshkin	Individual 15 km	217.5	1	1:04:18	209.100	31	426.600	13

== Ski jumping ==
Athlete	Event	First round		Final		
Athlete	Event	Points	Rank	Points	Total	Rank
Yury Moshkin	Normal hill	91.5	35	92.5	184.0	34
Nikolay Shamov	Normal hill	103.0	14	98.0	201.0	16
Koba Zakadze	Normal hill	107.0	8	78.0	185.0	30

== Speed skating ==
Men

Athlete	Event	Time	Rank
Oleg Goncharenko	5000 m	7:57.5	3rd place, bronze medalist(s)
Oleg Goncharenko	10000 m	16:42.3	3rd place, bronze medalist(s)
Rafayel Grach	500 m	40.8	2nd place, silver medalist(s)
Yevgeny Grishin	500 m	40.2 WR	1st place, gold medalist(s)
Yevgeny Grishin	1500 m	2:08.6 WR	1st place, gold medalist(s)
Robert Merkulov	1500 m	2:10.3	5
Yuri Mikhaylov	500 m	did not finish	
Yuri Mikhaylov	1500 m	2:08.6 WR	1st place, gold medalist(s)
Dmitry Sakunenko	5000 m	8:10.5	16
Yuri Sergeev	500 m	41.1	4
Boris Shilkov	1500 m	2:11.9	8
Boris Shilkov	5000 m	7:48.7 OR	1st place, gold medalist(s)
Vladimir Shilykovsky	10000 m	17:17.6	16
Boris Tsybin	10000 m	17:03.4	9
Boris Yakimov	5000 m	8:12.6	19
Boris Yakimov	10000 m	16:59.7	7

== Medals by republic ==
In the following table for team events number of team representatives, who received medals are counted, not "one medal for all the team", as usual. Because there were people from different republics in one team.

Rank	Nation	Gold	Silver	Bronze	Total
1	Russian SFSR	26	5	4	35
2	Ukrainian SSR	0	0	2	2
Totals (2 entries)		26	5	6	37
