= List of Soviet and Russian ice hockey goal scoring champions =

The following is a list of the annual goal scoring champions of the top Russian ice hockey league of each era, from the Soviet Championship League to the current Kontinental Hockey League.

== Soviet Championship ==
- 1946–47 Anatoli Tarasov - VVS Moscow
- 1947–48 Vsevolod Bobrov - CDKA Moscow
- 1948–49 Alexei Guryshev - Krylya Sovetov Moscow
- 1951–52 Vsevolod Bobrov - VVS Moscow
- 1950–51 Vsevolod Bobrov - VVS Moscow
- 1951–52 Vsevolod Bobrov - VVS Moscow
- 1952–53 Viktor Shuvalov - VVS Moscow
- 1953–54 Belyaev Bekyashev - ODO Leningrad
- 1954–55 Alexei Guryshev - Krylya Sovetov Moscow
- 1955–56 Vladimir Grebennikov - Krylya Sovetov Moscow
- 1956–57 Alexei Guryshev - Krylya Sovetov Moscow
- 1957–58 Alexei Guryshev - Krylya Sovetov Moscow
- 1958–59 Viktor Yakushev - Lokomotiv Moscow
- 1959–60 Robert Sakharovsky - Torpedo Gorky
- 1960–61 Yuri Borisov - Khimik Voskresensk; Oleg Korolenko - Metallurg Stalinsk; Yuri Paramoshkin - Elektrostal
- 1961–62 Yevgeni Groshev - Krylya Sovetov Moscow
- 1962–63 Veniamin Alexandrov - CSKA Moscow
- 1963–64 Alexander Almetov - CSKA Moscow
- 1964–65 Victor Tsyplakov - Lokomotiv Moscow
- 1965–66 Anatoli Firsov - CSKA Moscow
- 1966–67 Vyacheslav Starshinov - Spartak Moscow
- 1967–68 Vyacheslav Starshinov - Spartak Moscow
- 1968–69 Alexander Yakushev - Spartak Moscow
- 1969–70 Vladimir Petrov - CSKA Moscow
- 1970–71 Valeri Kharlamov - CSKA Moscow
- 1971–72 Vladimir Vikulov - CSKA Moscow
- 1972–73 Vladimir Petrov - CSKA Moscow
- 1973–74 Alexander Yakushev - Spartak Moscow
- 1974–75 Boris Mikhailov - CSKA Moscow
- 1975–76 Helmuts Balderis - Dinamo Riga; Boris Mikhailov - CSKA Moscow; Alexander Yakushev - Spartak Moscow
- 1976–77 Helmuts Balderis - Dinamo Riga
- 1977–78 Boris Mikhailov - CSKA Moscow
- 1978–79 Pyotr Prirodin - Dynamo Moscow
- 1979–80 Viktor Shalimov - Spartak Moscow
- 1980–81 Sergei Makarov - CSKA Moscow
- 1981–82 Aleksandr Kozhevnikov - Spartak Moscow
- 1982–83 Aleksei Frolikov - Dinamo Riga
- 1983–84 Vladimir Krutov - CSKA Moscow
- 1984–85 Helmuts Balderis - Dinamo Riga
- 1985–86 Vladimir Krutov - CSKA Moscow
- 1986–87 Vladimir Krutov - CSKA Moscow
- 1987–88 Andrei Khomutov - CSKA Moscow
- 1988–89 Sergei Makarov - CSKA Moscow; Yevgeni Shastin - Sokil Kiev
- 1989–90 Ramil Yuldashev - Sokil Kiev
- 1990–91 Ramil Yuldashev - Sokil Kiev

== CIS Championship ==
- 1991-92 Nikolai Borschevsky - Spartak Moscow

== International Hockey League ==
- 1992-93 Alexei Tkachuk - Spartak Moscow
- 1993-94 Dmitri Denisov - Salavat Yulaev Ufa
- 1994-95 Dmitri Denisov - Salavat Yulaev Ufa
- 1995-96 Alexander Korolyuk - Krylya Sovetov Moscow; Valentin Morozov - CSKA Moscow

== Russian Superleague ==
- 1996-97 Mikhail Ivanov - Severstal Cherepovets
- 1997-98 Oleg Antonenko - Neftekhimik Nizhnekamsk, Ak Bars Kazan; Vitali Prokhorov - Spartak Moscow
- 1998-99 Alexander Koreshkov - Metallurg Magnitogorsk
- 1999-2000 Alexander Gulyavtsev - Molot-Prikamye Perm
- 2000-01 Alexander Golts - Metallurg Magnitogorsk
- 2001-02 Andrei Kovalenko - Lokomotiv Yaroslavl
- 2002-03 Maxim Spiridonov - Amur Khabarovsk
- 2003-04 Andrei Kovalenko - Lokomotiv Yaroslavl; Eduard Kudermetov - Metallurg Magnitogorsk
- 2004-05 Dmitry Zatonsky - Avangard Omsk
- 2005-06 Alexei Morozov - Ak Bars Kazan
- 2006-07 Alexei Morozov - Ak Bars Kazan
- 2007-08 Sergei Mozyakin - Atlant Moscow Oblast

== Kontinental Hockey League ==
- 2008–09 Pavel Brendl - Torpedo Nizhny Novgorod; Jan Marek - Metallurg Magnitogorsk
- 2009–10 Marcel Hossa - Dinamo Riga
- 2010–11 Roman Červenka - Avangard Omsk
- 2011–12 Brandon Bochenski - Barys Astana
- 2012–13 Sergei Mozyakin - Metallurg Magnitogorsk
- 2013–14 Sergei Mozyakin - Metallurg Magnitogorsk
- 2014–15 Steve Moses - Jokerit
- 2015–16 Sergei Mozyakin - Metallurg Magnitogorsk
- 2016–17 Sergei Mozyakin - Metallurg Magnitogorsk
- 2017–18 Nigel Dawes - Barys Astana
- 2018–19 Kirill Kaprizov - CSKA Moscow
- 2019–20 Kirill Kaprizov - CSKA Moscow
- 2020–21 Dmitrij Jaškin - Dynamo Moscow
- 2021–22 Niko Ojamäki - Vityaz Podolsk
- 2022–23 Dmitrij Jaškin - SKA Saint Petersburg
- 2023–24 Reid Boucher - Avangard Omsk
- 2024–25 Josh Leivo – Salavat Yulaev Ufa
- 2025–26 Roman Kantserov – Metallurg Magnitogorsk

== See also ==
- List of Soviet and Russian ice hockey champions
- List of Soviet and Russian ice hockey scoring champions
- Soviet MVP (hockey)

== Sources ==
- CCCP Hockey International
- Internet Hockey Database
- A to Z of Ice Hockey.
