= Valentin Bystrov =

Russian ice hockey player and coach (1929–2017)

Personal information
- Born: 6 April 1929 Leningrad, Russian SSR, USSR
- Died: 15 January 2017 (aged 87) St. Petersburg, Russia

Sport
- Country: USSR/Russia
- Position: Attack
- Club: 1946—1950 SKIF (Leningrad); 1950—1954 Dynamo (Leningrad); 1954-1955 ODO (Leningrad); 1955—1961 Kirovets
Medal record
Silver medal – second place	1958 Norway	200 m

Valentin Aleksandrovich Bystrov (6 April 1929, Leningrad, RSFSR — 15 January 2017, St. Petersburg, Russian Federation) was a Soviet hockey player, coach, sports referee, and teacher. European Champion. Honored Master of Sports of Russia, Honored Trainer of the RSFSR, All-Union Category Judge.

== Biography ==
As a child, he spent time at the stadium of the Lesgaft Institute, where he played football in the summer and bandy in the winter. When Leningrad was under siege and, he went to work as an electrician. He took an active part in the defense of his hometown; he took part in night watches, cleared street rubble along with adults. He was awarded the medals “For the Defense of Leningrad ” and “For Valiant Labor in the Great Patriotic War.” After the war, he entered the Institute of Physical Education.

The SKIF hockey team (a sports club of the Institute of Physical Education) was created on the basis of the university. He was invited to the team by player coach Vladimir Lapin. Valentin Bystrov stood out for his speed, handled the puck well, and had a strong shot. In the 1949–50 season, the team made its debut in the elite of Soviet hockey and, at the end of the year, changed its name to Bolshevik. In the next four championships, he played for Dynamo and for ODO. In 1955, he moved to Avangard, which three years later changed its name to Kirovets. In the 1955/56 championship, he set a personal performance record with 20 goals scored. He finished performing on hockey rinks in 1961. In total, he played 240 matches in the USSR championships and scored 104 goals (73 in Kirovets, 29 in Dynamo, and one each in Bolshevik and ODO).

Due to his reluctance to move to capital clubs, he spent only one season on the national team. He has played six official matches and scored one goal against the Swedish team. Member of the first tour of the USSR national team to Canada, In the second match of the 1958 World Championship, he replaced Alexei Guryshev. Against the Polish national team, he played on the same line as Yuri Pantyukhov and Nikolai Khlystov.

In the 1961–62 championship, he was the head coach of the Kirovets. Then he switched to teaching at his native university but did not part with hockey, coaching various Leningrad teams. From 1968 to 1971, he headed the Polish GKS. Under his leadership, the club from Katowice won the national cup and the Polish championship twice.

After returning home, in parallel with teaching, he led the Storm team of masters. Then he was an assistant to Igor Romishevsky and Boris Mikhailov at SKA. He trained several hockey players who became world champions in hockey among youth teams and dozens of masters of sports. The two most famous students are Alexey Gusarov and Evgeny Belosheykin. Valentin Bystrov is a judge in the all-Union category, a member of the presidium of the St. Petersburg Hockey Federation, and the author of a number of teaching aids.

His daughter, Inna Valentinovna Bystrova, is an Honored Trainer of Russia and associate professor of the Department of Gymnastics.

He was buried at the Serafimovskoye cemetery.

== Awards ==
In 1996, he was awarded the medal of the Order of Merit for the Fatherland, II degree.

In 2003, he was awarded the honorary title “Honored Master of Sports of Russia.”

== Achievements ==
- Silver medalist of the World Championship - 1958
- European champion - 1958.
