= Harijs Mellups =

Latvian footballer and ice hockey player

- Born: 1927; Sarkandaugava, Riga, Latvia
- Died: 5 January 1950 (aged 23); Koltsovo Airport, Sverdlovsk, USSR
- Cause of death: Plane crash
Association football career
- Position: Forward
Senior career*
Years	Team	Apps	(Gls)
1940-1941	Aldaris		
1941-1946	Universitates sporta		
1946-1948	Soviet Latvia youth football		
1946-1949	FK Dinamo Rīga		(56)
- * Club domestic league appearances and goals
Ice hockey career
- Position: Goaltender
- Played for: Universitates sporta (1944-?); Soviet Latvia (1946-1949); Dinamo Riga (1946-1949); VVS Moscow (1949-1950)

Harijs Mellups (1927, Sarkandaugava - 5 January 1950, Sverdlovsk) was a Latvian footballer, boxer, basketball player, and ice hockey player. He died in the 1950 Sverdlovsk plane crash at age 23.

== Biography ==
A native of Sarkandaugava in Riga, Mellups grew up playing football in the streets and ice hockey on a frozen river in the winter. He played basketball in high school and attended Riga State Technical School; he also studied chemistry at Riga Industrial Polytechnic.

During the USSR's occupation of Latvia, Mellups played football with Aldaris (1940-1941) and Universitates sporta (1941-1946). After the war, he joined FK Dinamo Rīga (1946-1949) and played on Soviet Latvia's youth football team (1946-1948). Mellups scored 20 goals for Dinamo in both 1946 and 1948 and 16 in 1947, and was part of the 1945 championship team.

Mellups competed in youth boxing for Universitates sporta and was champion in bantamweight (1944) and lightweight (1945, 1947). He was also nominated for the national team. After the war, he boxed for Dinamo Riga's boxing team and played for their basketball team.

Mellups began playing ice hockey in the 1943-1944 season as the goaltender. His first game was a 1944 friendly with the Universitates sporta first team. After the war, he played with Dinamo Rīga again and with Soviet Latvia's hockey team. He reportedly only allowed three goals during the 1946-1947 season. After disagreements with the owners of Dinamo, he joined VVS Moscow, the Soviet Air Force's ice hockey team along with teammate Roberts Šūlmanis. He also played football in Moscow at the highest level.

Mellups, Šūlmanis, and nine other VVS Moscow players died in a plane crash on 5 January 1950. Vsevolod Bobrov later recognized Mellups as among the most technically skilled goalkeepers in the USSR.
