= Speed skating at the 1956 Winter Olympics – Men's 10,000 metres =

Men's 10,000 metres speed skating at the VII Olympic Winter Games
- Pictogram for speed skating
- Venue: Lake Misurina
- Date: 31 January 1956
- Competitors: 32 from 15 nations
- Winning time: 16:35.9 OR

Medalists
1st place, gold medalist(s)		Sigvard Ericsson; Sweden
2nd place, silver medalist(s)		Knut Johannesen; Norway
3rd place, bronze medalist(s)		Oleg Goncharenko; Soviet Union

The 10,000-metre speed skating event was part of the speed skating at the 1956 Winter Olympics programme. It was the last speed skating contest at this Games. The competition was held on naturally frozen ice on the Lake Misurina. It was held on Tuesday, 31 January 1956, from 10 a.m. to 3:15 p.m. Thirty-two speed skaters from 15 nations competed.

== Medalists ==
Gold	Silver	Bronze
Sigvard Ericsson; Sweden	Knut Johannesen; Norway	Oleg Goncharenko; Soviet Union

== Records ==
These were the standing world and Olympic records (in minutes) prior to the 1956 Winter Olympics.

World record	16:32.6(*)	(Norway) Hjalmar Andersen	Hamar (NOR)	10 February 1952
Olympic record	16:45.8(*)	(Norway) Hjalmar Andersen	Oslo (NOR)	19 February 1952

(*) The record was set on naturally frozen ice.

At first Oleg Goncharenko who skated in the third pair set a new Olympic record with 16:42.3 minutes. In the seventh pair Knut Johannesen bettered the Olympic record with 16:36.9 minutes. Finally Sigvard Ericsson set a new Olympic record with 16:35.9 minutes on the way to win the tenth heat and the gold medal.

== Results ==
Place	Speed skater	Time
1	Sigvard Ericsson (SWE)	16:35.9 OR
2	Knut Johannesen (NOR)	16:36.9
3	Oleg Goncharenko (URS)	16:42.3
4	Sverre Ingolf Haugli (NOR)	16:48.7
5	Kees Broekman (NED)	16:51.2
6	Hjalmar Andersen (NOR)	16:52.6
7	Boris Yakimov (URS)	16:59.7
8	Olle Dahlberg (SWE)	17:01.3
9	Boris Tsybin (URS)	17:03.4
10	Helmut Kuhnert (EUA)	17:04.6
11	Johnny Cronshey (GBR)	17:05.6
12	Juhani Järvinen (FIN)	17:05.9
13	Sven Andersson (SWE)	17:13.5
14	Vladimír Kolář (TCH)	17:16.9
15	Gunnar Ström (SWE)	17:17.0
16	Vladimir Shilykovski (URS)	17:17.6
17	Kauko Salomaa (FIN)	17:19.0
18	Wim de Graaff (NED)	17:21.6
19	Knut Tangen (NOR)	17:22.3
20	John Hearn (GBR)	17:27.6
21	Hans Keller (EUA)	17:27.7
22	Taketsugu Asazaka (JPN)	17:35.3
23	Yoshiyasu Gomi (JPN)	17:35.9
24	Toivo Salonen (FIN)	17:37.6
25	Egbert van't Oever (NED)	17:37.7
26	Bohumil Jauris (TCH)	17:38.4
27	Colin Hickey (AUS)	17:45.6
27	Pat McNamara (USA)	17:45.6
29	Arthur Mannsbarth (AUT)	17:47.8
30	Kim Jong-Sun (KOR)	17:52.6
31	Ralf Olin (CAN)	17:59.2
32	Carlo Calzà (ITA)	18:32.8

== See also ==
- List of IOC country codes
- 1956 Winter Olympics
