= 1956 Winter Olympics medal table =

List of medals won by Olympic delegations at the VII Olympic Winter Games

1956 Winter Olympics medals
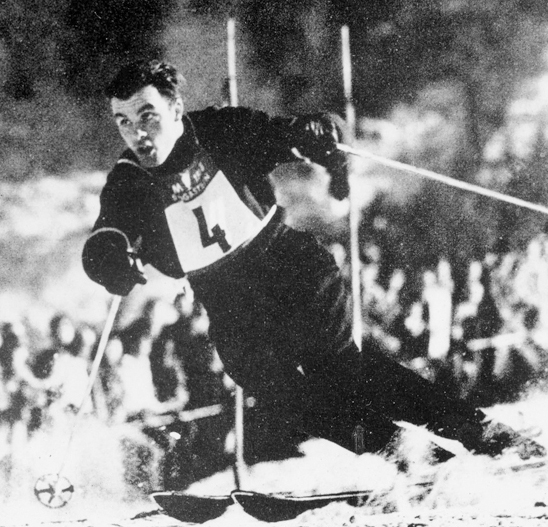
- Toni Sailer of Austria won the most gold medals at the 1956 Winter Olympics, winning all three gold medals in men's alpine skiing
- Location: Cortina d'Ampezzo, Italy

Highlights
- Most gold medals: Soviet Union (7)
- Most total medals: Soviet Union (16)
- Medalling NOCs: 13

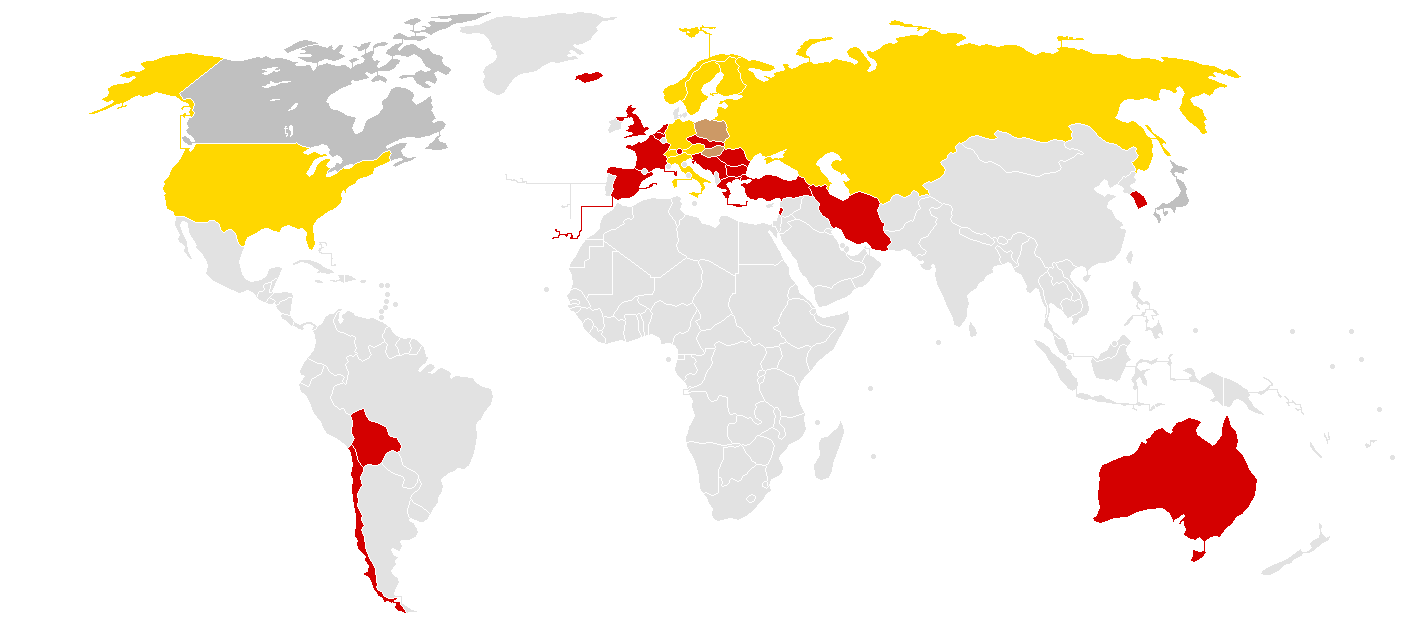
World map showing the medal achievements of each country during the 1956 Winter Olympics Legend: represents countries that won at least one gold medal. represents countries that won at least one silver medal but no gold medals. represents countries that won at least one bronze medal but no gold or silver medals. represents countries that did not win any medals. represents entities that did not participate in the 1956 Winter Olympics.

The 1956 Winter Olympics, officially known as the VII Olympic Winter Games, was an international multi-sport event held in Cortina d'Ampezzo, Italy, from 26 January to 5 February 1956. A total of 821 athletes representing 32 National Olympic Committees (NOCs) participated. The games featured 24 events in 4 sports across 8 disciplines.

Overall, athletes from 13 nations received at least one medal, and 9 of them won at least one gold medal. At their first Winter Olympics, athletes from the Soviet Union won the most gold medals, with 7, and the most overall medals, with 16. Athletes from Austria came second in the medal table with 4 gold medals and 11 medals overall, while athletes from Finland came third with 3 gold medals and 7 medals overall. Teams from Poland and Japan won their nations' first Winter Olympic medals.

Alpine skier Toni Sailer of Austria won the most gold medals for an individual at the Games. He won the three gold medals available in the men's alpine skiing events and became the first person to do so. Cross-country skier Sixten Jernberg of Sweden won the most overall medals for an individual at the Games, winning four medals with one gold, two silvers, and one bronze.

== Medal table ==
The medal table is based on information provided by the International Olympic Committee (IOC) and is consistent with IOC conventional sorting in its published medal tables. The table uses the Olympic medal table sorting method. By default, the table is ordered by the number of gold medals the athletes from a nation have won. The number of silver medals is taken into consideration next and then the number of bronze medals.

In speed skating, two gold medals (and no silver) were awarded to Yevgeny Grishin and Yuri Mikhaylov for a first-place tie in the men's 1500 metres event.

* Host nation (Italy)

1956 Winter Olympics medal table
Rank	Nation	Gold	Silver	Bronze	Total
1	Soviet Union	7	3	6	16
2	Austria	4	3	4	11
3	Finland	3	3	1	7
4	Switzerland	3	2	1	6
5	Sweden	2	4	4	10
6	United States	2	3	2	7
7	Norway	2	1	1	4
8	Italy*	1	2	0	3
9	United Team of Germany (Note: A unified team comprising East Germany and West Germany competed from the 1956 Winter Olympics to the 1964 Winter Olympics. This decision was made because of the splitting of Germany after World War II and a condition that the National Olympic Committee of the German Democratic Republic (East Germany) would be recognized if both nations agreed to compete under the same team.)	1	0	1	2
10	Canada	0	1	2	3
11	Japan	0	1	0	1
12	Hungary	0	0	1	1
12	Poland	0	0	1	1
Totals (13 entries)		25	23	24	72
