= Sven Andersson =

Sven Andersson may refer to:

- Sven Andersson (farmworker) (1668–1691)
- Sven Andersson (footballer, born 1907) (1907–1981), Swedish footballer
- Sven Andersson (footballer, born 1945), Swedish footballer
- Sven Andersson (footballer, born 1963), Swedish footballer
- Sven Andersson (ice hockey) (born 1932), Swedish ice hockey player
- Sven Andersson (politician) (1910–1987), Swedish politician
- Sven Andersson (speed skater) (1921–2016), Swedish speed skater
- Sven Andersson i Billingsfors, Swedish politician
- Sven Andersson i Sveneby, Swedish politician
