= Speed skating at the 1956 Winter Olympics – Men's 5000 metres =

Men's 5000 metres speed skating at the VII Olympic Winter Games
- Pictogram for speed skating
- Venue: Lake Misurina
- Date: 29 January 1956
- Competitors: 46 from 17 nations
- Winning time: 7:48.7 OR

Medalists
1st place, gold medalist(s)		Boris Shilkov; Soviet Union
2nd place, silver medalist(s)		Sigvard Ericsson; Sweden
3rd place, bronze medalist(s)		Oleg Goncharenko; Soviet Union

The 5000 metres speed skating event was part of the speed skating at the 1956 Winter Olympics programme. The competition was held on naturally frozen ice on the Lake Misurina. It was held on Sunday, 29 January 1956, started at 11 a.m. and ended at 3 p.m. Forty-six speed skaters from 17 nations competed.

== Medalists ==
Gold	Silver	Bronze
Boris Shilkov (URS)	Sigge Ericsson (SWE)	Oleg Goncharenko (URS)

== Records ==
These were the standing world and Olympic records (in minutes) prior to the 1956 Winter Olympics.

World record	7:45.6(*)	(Soviet Union) Boris Shilkov	Medeo (URS)	9 January 1955
Olympic record	8:10.6(**)	(Norway) Hjalmar Andersen	Oslo (NOR)	17 February 1952

(*) The record was set in a high altitude venue (more than 1000 metres above sea level) and on naturally frozen ice.

(**) The record was set on naturally frozen ice.

At first Helmut Kuhnert who skated in the first pair set a new Olympic record with 8:04.3 minutes. In the third pair Wim de Graaff bettered the Olympic record with 8:00.2 minutes. Finally Boris Shilkov set a new Olympic record with 7:48.7 minutes on the way to win the fourth heat and the gold medal.

== Results ==
Place	Speed skater	Time
1	Boris Shilkov (URS)	7:48.7 OR
2	Sigvard Ericsson (SWE)	7:56.7
3	Oleg Goncharenko (URS)	7:57.5
4	Kees Broekman (NED)	8:00.2
4	Wim de Graaff (NED)	8:00.2
6	Roald Aas (NOR)	8:01.6
7	Olle Dahlberg (SWE)	8:01.8
8	Knut Johannesen (NOR)	8:02.3
9	Helmut Kuhnert (EUA)	8:04.3
10	Torstein Seiersten (NOR)	8:06.4
11	Hjalmar Andersen (NOR)	8:06.5
12	Gunnar Sjölin (SWE)	8:06.7
13	Vladimír Kolář (TCH)	8:08.9
14	Colin Hickey (AUS)	8:10.0
15	Johnny Cronshey (GBR)	8:10.1
16	Dmitri Sakunenko (URS)	8:10.5
17	Pat McNamara (USA)	8:10.6
18	Gerard Maarse (NED)	8:11.1
19	Boris Yakimov (URS)	8:12.6
20	Juhani Järvinen (FIN)	8:13.7
21	Kauko Salomaa (FIN)	8:14.3
22	Sven Andersson (SWE)	8:16.9
23	Jang Yeong (KOR)	8:17.6
24	Jeen van den Berg (NED)	8:19.1
25	Leo Tynkkynen (FIN)	8:19.9
26	John Hearn (GBR)	8:21.4
27	Yoshiyasu Gomi (JPN)	8:22.2
28	Taketsugu Asazaka (JPN)	8:23.6
28	Arthur Mannsbarth (AUT)	8:23.6
30	Hans Keller (EUA)	8:24.5
31	Gene Sandvig (USA)	8:25.5
32	Matti Hamberg (FIN)	8:28.8
33	Ralf Olin (CAN)	8:30.5
34	Franz Offenberger (AUT)	8:30.8
35	Raymond Gilloz (FRA)	8:32.5
36	Kim Jong-Sun (KOR)	8:34.3
37	Pyeon Chang-Nam (KOR)	8:36.7
38	Kurt Eminger (AUT)	8:39.4
39	Jürg Rohrbach (SUI)	8:39.5
40	Art Longsjo (USA)	8:40.0
41	Carlo Calzà (ITA)	8:41.1
42	Alex Connell (GBR)	8:42.5
43	Chuck Burke (USA)	8:47.4
44	Paolino Dimai (ITA)	8:48.0
45	Remo Tomasi (ITA)	8:48.3
46	Yoshitaki Hori (JPN)	8:53.5

== See also ==
- List of IOC country codes
- 1956 Winter Olympics
