= Sigvard Ericsson =

Swedish speed skater (1930–2019)

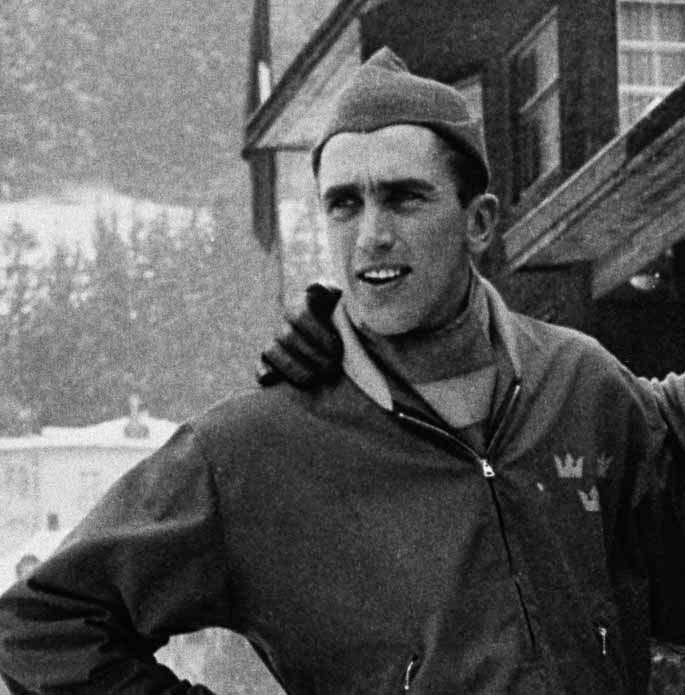
- Sigge Ericsson in 1956

Personal information
- Nickname: Sigge
- Nationality: Swedish
- Born: John Sigvard Ericsson; 17 July 1930 Alanäset, Sweden
- Died: 2 November 2019 (aged 89)

Sport
- Country: Sweden
- Sport: Speed skating
- Club: IF Castor, Östersund

Achievements and titles
- Personal best(s): 500 m: 44.0 (1955); 1000 m: 1:31.0 (1958); 1500 m: 2:11.0 (1956); 3000 m: 4:45.3 (1956); 5000 m: 7:56.7 (1956); 10 000 m: 16:35.9 (1956)
Medal record
Representing Sweden
Olympic Games
Gold medal – first place	1956 Cortina d'Ampezzo	10000 m
Silver medal – second place	1956 Cortina d'Ampezzo	5000 m
World Championships
Gold medal – first place	1955 Moscow	Allround
European Championships
Bronze medal – third place	1954 Davos	Allround
Gold medal – first place	1955 Falun	Allround
Bronze medal – third place	1956 Helsinki	Allround

John Sigvard "Sigge" Ericsson (17 July 1930 – 2 November 2019) was a Swedish speed skater. He competed at the 1952 and 1956 Winter Olympics and won a gold and a silver medal in 1956 in Cortina.

== Biography ==
Ericsson started competing internationally in 1951 at the European Allround Championships where he did not qualify for the final distance. The next year, he participated again and he also participated in the 1952 Winter Olympics, but it would be a few more years until he won any international medals.

In 1953, the male Soviet skaters started competing internationally again for the first time since World War II and they took the world by storm. By 1954, most of the world records (for both men and women) were held by Soviet skaters – all those records having been skated on the fast ice of the Medeo rink in Alma-Ata. Among the best Soviet skaters of that time were Oleg Goncharenko and Boris Shilkov, who had taken one gold medal each and one silver medal each at the World Allround Championships of 1953 and 1954, making them the favourites at the 1954 European Allround Championships that followed. But while Shilkov became European Champion that year, Goncharenko finished 4th, having to allow silver medallist Hjalmar Andersen and bronze medallist Ericsson before him. This was Ericsson's first international medal.

The next year, Ericsson became the 1955 European Allround Champion, ahead of Shilkov (who took silver) and Dmitry Sakunenko (who won bronze). This made him the first to keep the Soviet skaters from taking gold at international competitions since they had re-entered the international skating world two years earlier. Two weeks later, Ericsson became World Allround Champion in Moscow, beating Goncharenko (silver) and Shilkov (bronze) on their "home ground".

Ericsson then participated in the 1956 Winter Olympics and he won silver on the 5000 m, behind world record holder Boris Shilkov, but ahead of bronze medallist Oleg Goncharenko. Two days later, Ericsson participated in the 10000 m – one of the very few distances at the time in which the world record was not held by a Soviet skater. Knut Johannesen skated a very fast 16:36.9 – only a little over four seconds slower than the world record held by Hjalmar Andersen – and it seemed that Johannesen's first international medal would be Olympic gold. But Ericsson managed to beat the time set by Johannesen by one second, setting a new Olympic record and becoming Olympic Champion on the 10000 m.

Later in February that year, Ericsson finished only 6th at the 1956 World Allround Championships and he won bronze at the European Allround Championships. The following season, Ericsson did not participate in the 1957 European Allround Championships, choosing to concentrate instead on the World Allround Championships held in Östersund, Jämtland – his home ground. However, he finished in a very disappointing ninth place and would not compete internationally again.

Ericsson was awarded the Svenska Dagbladet Gold Medal in 1955.

== National championships ==
Ericsson won 11 national titles:

- Swedish Championships 1500 m: 1954, 1955 and 1956.
- Swedish Championships 5000 m: 1953, 1954, 1955 and 1956.
- Swedish Championships 10000 m: 1952, 1954, 1955 and 1956.

Note that Sweden did not have any National Allround Championships from 1935 to 1962 – only National Single Distance Championships.

== Personal records ==
To put these personal records in perspective, the last column (WR) lists the official world records on the dates that Ericsson skated his personal records.

Event	Result	Date	Venue	WR
500 m	44.0	28 February 1955	Tønsberg	40.8
1000 m	1:31.0	20 January 1958	Östersund	1:22.8
1500 m	2:11.0	30 January 1956	Misurina	2:09.1
3000 m	4:45.3	6 March 1956	Evarnsveden	4:40.2
5000 m	7:56.7	29 January 1956	Misurina	7:45.6
10000 m	16:35.9	31 January 1956	Misurina	16:32.6

Ericsson has an Adelskalender score of 185.131 points. His highest ranking on the Adelskalender was a fifth place.

Awards
Preceded by Bengt Nilsson	Svenska Dagbladet Gold Medal; 1955	Succeeded by Lars Hall and Sixten Jernberg
