= 1946–47 Soviet League season =

Soviet ice hockey season

The 1946–47 Soviet Championship League season was the first season of the Soviet Championship League, the top level of ice hockey in the Soviet Union. There were 12 teams in the league, 8 of which were associated with the army or police. The season began on December 22, 1946, and lasted until January 20, 1947. Dynamo Moscow won the championship.

== First round ==
=== Group A ===
	Club	GP	W	T	L	GF	GA	Pts
1.	CDKA Moscow	3	2	1	0	11	5	5
2.	VVS Moscow	3	2	0	1	17	8	4
3.	Dom Ofizerov Sverdlovsk	3	1	0	2	1	12	2
4.	Dom Ofizerov Leningrad	3	0	1	2	4	8	1

=== Group B ===
	Club	GP	W	T	L	GF	GA	Pts
1.	Spartak Moscow	3	3	0	0	19	8	6
2.	Dinamo Riga	3	2	0	1	13	9	4
3.	Dünamo Tallinn	3	0	1	2	6	14	1
4.	Dynamo Leningrad	3	0	1	2	5	12	1

=== Group C ===
	Club	GP	W	T	L	GF	GA	Pts
1.	Dynamo Moscow	3	3	0	0	33	2	6
2.	Vodnik Archangelsk	3	2	0	1	10	8	4
3.	Spartak Kaunas	3	1	0	2	13	6	2
4.	Spartak Uzgorod	3	0	0	3	4	44	0

== Final round ==
Group A	Club	GP	W	T	L	GF	GA	Pts
1.	Dynamo Moscow	4	2	0	2	10	6	4
2.	CDKA Moscow	4	2	0	2	5	6	4
3.	Spartak Moscow	4	2	0	2	4	7	4

== 4th-8th place ==
Group B	Club	GP	W	T	L	GF	GA	Pts
1.	Dinamo Riga	3	2	1	0	9	2	5
2.	VVS Moscow	3	2	1	0	16	5	5
3.	Vodnik Archangelsk	3	1	0	2	7	13	2
4.	Spartak Kaunas	3	0	0	3	4	16	0
