= Vsevolod Bobrov =

Soviet athlete and coach (1922–1979)

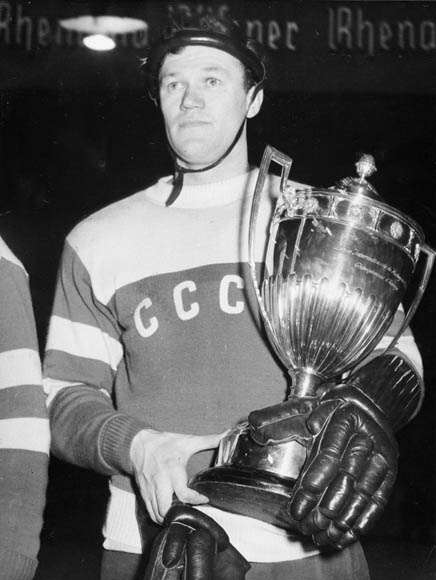
- Bobrov with the Soviet national team in the 1956 Olympic Ice Hockey Tournament in Cortina-d'Ampezzo, Italy
- Born: 1 December 1922; Morshansk, Tambov, Russian SFSR
- Died: 1 July 1979 (aged 56); Moscow, Russian SFSR, Soviet Union
- Height: 1.78 m (5 ft 10 in)
Association football career
- Position: Striker
Senior career*
Years	Team	Apps	(Gls)
1944	Aviauchilische Moscow	?	
1945–1949	CDKA Moscow	79	(82)
1945	→ Dynamo Moscow (guest)	0	(0)
1950–1952	VVS Moscow	32	(14)
1953	FC Spartak Moscow	4	(3)
International career
1952	USSR	3	(5)
Managerial career
- 1952: VVS Moscow
- 1957: CSK MO Moscow (director)
- 1958–1960: CSKA Moscow (assistant)
- 1963: FC Chornomorets Odesa
- 1967–1969: CSKA Moscow
- 1975: FC Kairat
- 1977–1978: CSKA Moscow
- * Club domestic league appearances and goals
Ice hockey career
- Position: Left wing
- Shot: Right
- Played for: CSKA Moscow; VVS Moscow (USSR)
- National team: Soviet Union
- Playing career: 1946–1957
Medal record
Representing Soviet Union
Gold medal – first place	1956 Cortina d'Ampezzo	Team

Vsevolod Mikhailovich Bobrov (Russian: Всеволод Михайлович Бобров, IPA: [ˈfsʲevələd bɐˈbrof]; 1 December 1922 – 1 July 1979) was a Soviet athlete, who excelled in football, bandy and ice hockey. He is considered one of the best Soviets ever in each of those sports.

Originally a football player, he played for CDKA Moscow, VVS Moscow, and Spartak Moscow, and represented the Soviet Union internationally at the 1952 Summer Olympics. After he quit football in 1953 he turned to ice hockey, which he had taken up when it was started in the Soviet Union in 1946. He was one of the first ice hockey players in the Soviet Union, and joined CDKA Moscow, playing for them and VVS Moscow before retiring in 1957. A leading scorer in the Soviet League, Bobrov was one of three players to average more than two goals per game over their career, with the other two players (Alexei Guryshev and Viktor Shuvalov) his linemates. Internationally he participated with the Soviet national team at several World Championships, including their first tournament in 1954, as well as the 1956 Winter Olympics, where the Soviets won the gold medal.

After his playing career, Bobrov coached both football and ice hockey. He coached the Soviet national team in ice hockey, most notably during the 1972 Summit Series against Canada. He was inducted into the International Ice Hockey Federation Hall of Fame when it was founded in 1997. The Kontinental Hockey League (KHL), a Russian-based league, has one of its four divisions named after Bobrov.

== Early life ==
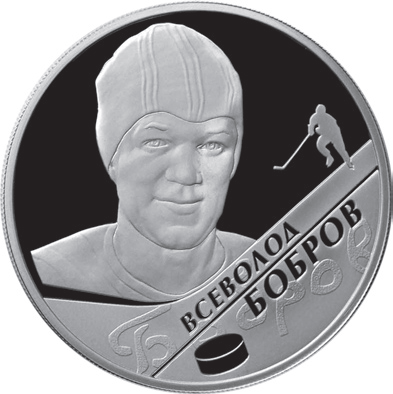
Russian commemorative coin celebrating Bobrov

Bobrov was born in Morshansk on 1 December 1922, not far from where Antonovshchina (Tambov Rebellion) took place. When he was about 2-3 years of age in 1925, his family moved to Sestroretsk near Leningrad. He first started to skate at the age of 5, and played bandy from a young age. He left school at the age of 13 to work in a factory. Other sources claim that he completed a standard post-secondary education, which included the seven year classical education and couple of years in a professional technical school (FZU) where he earned a certificate of the instrument assembly specialist, 4th Class. FZU was a system of educational institutions within factories.

Soon after the start of the Operation Barbarossa, the factory where Bobrov worked was evacuated to Omsk. In Omsk, he graduated from the Red Army Quartermaster School in 1943.

== Playing career ==
=== Football ===
After serving in the Soviet Army during World War II, he was invited to play football for the Army club CSKA Moscow in 1945. That same year, he joined Dynamo Moscow on their 1945 tour of the United Kingdom; he scored 6 of the 19 their goals, and it was on this tour that he saw artificial ice for the first time. Playing until 1953 for CSKA, VVS, and Spartak, he would go on to win the Soviet Championship three times, scoring 97 goals in only 116 games. Bobrov led the country in goals in 1945 with 24 and 1947 with 14. Chronic knee problems led to him having surgeries in 1947, 1950, 1952, and 1953, to fix the issue, though it never was resolved.

He was capped three times for the Soviet Union national team representing them in the 1952 Summer Olympics. He scored five goals in total, including a hat trick against Yugoslavia, though the Soviets lost that match and failed to medal. He was also part of the CDKA team that was disbanded by the government due to this loss, and transferred to Spartak Moscow for his final season of football.

=== Ice hockey ===
Bobrov began playing ice hockey for CSKA a year after his football start, in 1946. However, due to a knee injury sustained during the football season, he missed the first season. His playing career in this sport lasted until 1957, with the years between 1950 and 1953 spent with VVS. Although football was Bobrov's first sport, his success in ice hockey was even greater. In 1947–48, his first season of play, Bobrov scored 52 goals in 18 games. In 1950, a plane crash killed almost the entire VVS Moscow team. Bobrov survived the crash as he overslept and travelled by rail. In the Soviet League, which his teams won seven times, Bobrov scored 254 goals in 130 games; he is one of three players who averaged more than a goal per game in the Soviet Championship (along with Alexei Guryshev and Viktor Shuvalov; the three were linemates). During his career Bobrov was known for his "timing and vision." Anatoli Tarasov said he "controlled the rubber," and later observed that Bobrov was "in slow motion in a way much like [Wayne] Gretzky, which could slow down the whole game and give him seemingly more time to think, to compose the next verse." However he did not focus on defence, and would often stay at centre ice for periods of 10 to 20 seconds.

Internationally Bobrov played for the Soviet national team in the 1956 Winter Olympics, becoming one of the few athletes to participate in both the Summer and Winter Olympics. Bobrov proceeded to lead his country to the gold medal, and also won the World Championship in 1954 and 1956. He won silver in 1955 when his team lost to Canada, represented by the Penticton Vees. He suffered a career-ending injury in 1957. Overall, he scored 89 goals in 59 games for his country. In Russian ice hockey, his name was given to an exclusive list of players, the Bobrov Club, who scored over 250 goals during their career.

Bobrov, who served as a player-coach in both sports during his time with VVS, would go on to coach various teams after retiring as a player in both football and ice hockey. In the latter, he coached the USSR in the 1972 Summit Series and then led them to the World Championship in 1974 and 1975.

== Later life and legacy ==
Bobrov died in Moscow in 1979. He was posthumously inducted into the inaugural class of the IIHF Hall of Fame in 1997. For the greatest Russian athlete in the 20th century, Bobrov finished third behind football goalkeeper Lev Yashin and Greco-Roman wrestler Alexander Karelin.

The Kontinental Hockey League, a Russian-based ice hockey league, has one of its four divisions named after Bobrov.

== Bibliography ==
- MacAskill, Robert; Welsh, Kenneth (1992), Summit on Ice (film), Toronto: CBC
- Martin, Lawrence (1990), The Red Machine: The Soviet Quest to Dominate Canada's Game, Toronto: Doubleday Canada, ISBN 0-385-25272-2
- Prokhorov, A. M., ed. (1969), "Бобров, Всеволод Михайлович" [Bobrov, Vsevolod Mikhailovich], Great Soviet Encyclopedia (in Russian) (3rd ed.), Moscow: Sovetskaya Entsikolpediya
- Wallechinsky, David and Jaime Loucky (2010). "Ice Hockey: Men". In The Complete Book of the Winter Olympics: 2010 Edition. London: Aurum Press Limited. p. 25.
