= Aleksandr Uvarov =

Aleksandr Uvarov may refer to:

- Aleksandr Uvarov (footballer) (born 1960), Soviet footballer
- Alexander Uvarov (1922–1994), Soviet ice hockey player
