= Paolino Dimai =

Italian speed skater

Personal information
- Nationality: Italian
- Born: 28 January 1931 Cortina d'Ampezzo, Italy
- Died: 5 February 2011 (aged 80)

Sport
- Sport: Speed skating

Paolino Dimai (28 January 1931 – 5 February 2011) was an Italian speed skater. He competed in the men's 5000 metres event at the 1956 Winter Olympics.
