= Helmut Kuhnert =

German speed skater

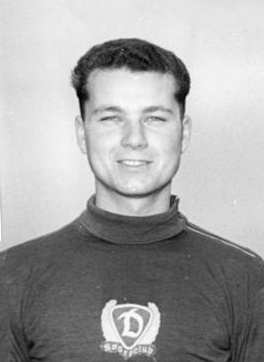
- Helmut Kuhnert in 1955

Personal information
- Born: 1 March 1936 (age 90) Berlin, Germany
- Height: 1.86 m (6 ft 1 in)
- Weight: 90 kg (200 lb)

Sport
- Sport: Speed skating
- Club: SC Dynamo Berlin
Medal record
Representing East Germany
World Championships
Bronze medal – third place	1960 Davos	All-around

Helmut Kuhnert (born 1 March 1936) is a retired East German speed skater. He competed at the 1956, 1960 and 1964 Winter Olympics in eight events in total. His best achievements were ninth place in 5000 m in 1956 and in 1500 m in 1960. He won a bronze all-around medal at the 1960 World Championships.

Personal bests:

- 500 m – 41.8 (1964)
- 1500 m – 2:12.4 (1960)
- 5000 m – 8:03.0 (1956)
- 10000 m – 16:33.2 (1956)
