= Anatoly Tarasov =

Russian ice hockey player and coach

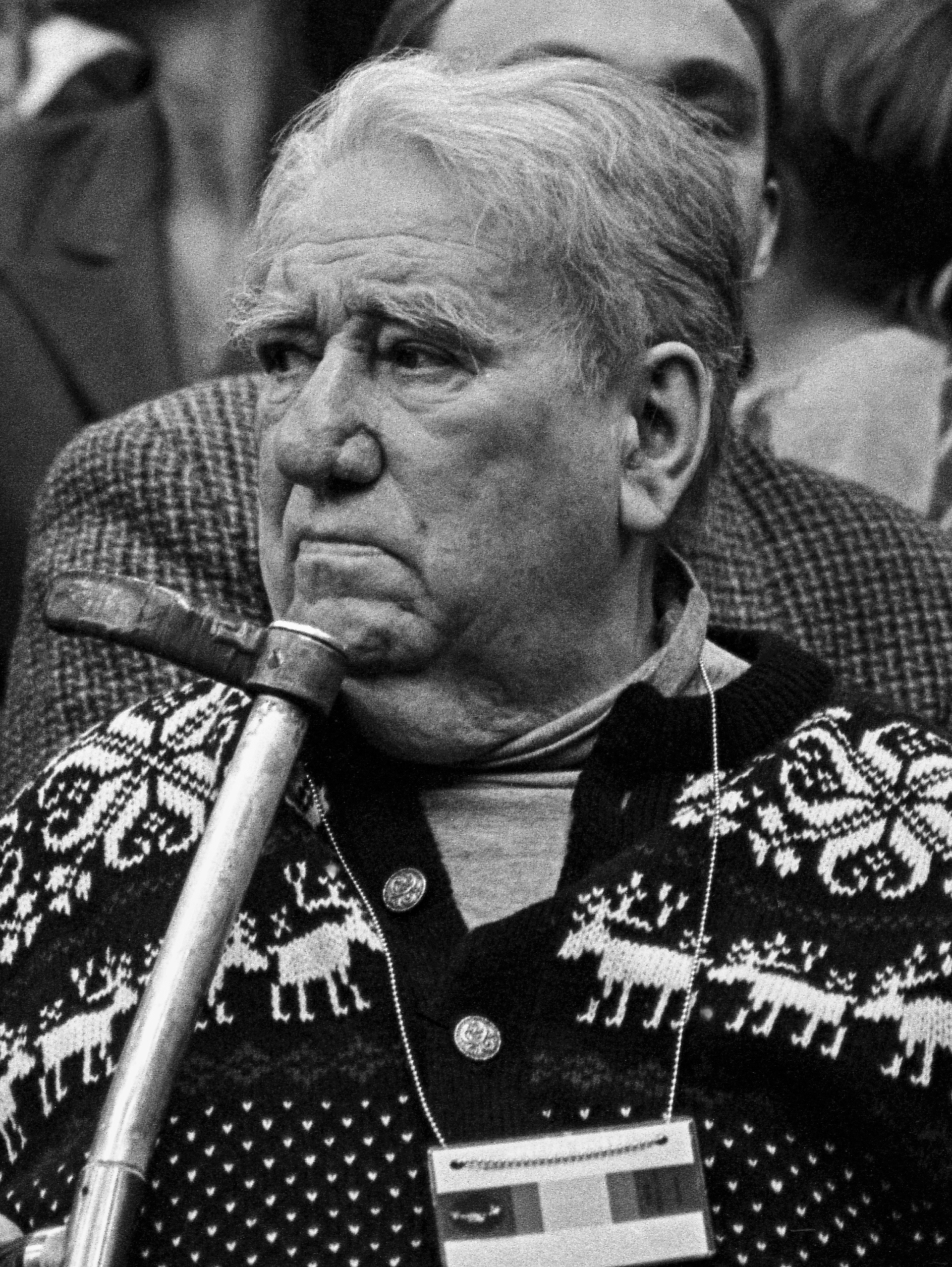
- Tarasov in 1994
- Born: Anatoly Vladimirovich Tarasov; 10 December 1918; Moscow, Russian SFSR
- Died: 23 June 1995 (aged 76); Moscow, Russia
- Occupations: Ice hockey player and coach
- Years active: 1945–1974
- Spouse: Nina Tarasova
- Awards: Merited Master of Sport of the USSR; Merited Coach of the USSR; Russian and Soviet Hockey Hall of Fame; Hockey Hall of Fame; IIHF Hall of Fame

Anatoly Vladimirovich Tarasov (Russian: Анато́лий Влади́мирович Тара́сов; 10 December 1918 – 23 June 1995) was a Russian ice hockey player and coach. Tarasov is considered "the father of Russian ice hockey" and established the Soviet Union national team as "the dominant force in international competition". He was one of the first Russians to be inducted into the Hockey Hall of Fame, having been inducted in 1974 in the builders category. He was inducted into the inaugural class of the IIHF Hall of Fame in 1997.

Tarasov also played and managed in the sport of football, but is best known for his work in developing the USSR's ice hockey program. He is the father of figure skating coach Tatiana Tarasova.

== Ice hockey career ==
After World War II, Tarasov was asked by the Ministry of Sports of the USSR to put together a hockey program from scratch. He helped found a hockey department at the Soviet Army's sports club, CSKA Moscow with little more than several old hockey rule books. Before then, the most popular ice sport in Russia and the Soviet Union was bandy, a sport similar to field hockey, but played on ice. The Russian style of hockey, with its emphasis on skating skill, offense and passing, is still heavily influenced by bandy.

Tarasov served either as coach or co-coach of CSKA Moscow from 1946 to 1975, except for three short breaks in 1960, 1964 and 1972. He was named coach of the Soviet national team in 1958, a post he held until 1960. He was then an assistant coach of Soviet national team to Arkady Chernyshev from 1963 until 1972.

When hockey was introduced in the USSR, Tarasov, like the rest of the nation, fell in love with the game. It was his ideals and philosophies that shaped the Russian game into what it is today - fast, graceful, non-individualistic, and patriotic. To him, real teamwork was based on a common aim - comradeship and caring for each team member. This is why he introduced a rule that, in order to make the line-up, the team had to approve of each player.

Tarasov devised many new training methods. Most of them centered on passing, for he felt passing was the key to their success, "after all, the ultimate aim of a pass was to get a free player. So if our opponents make 150 passes in a game against our 270, this means we had 120 more playing opportunities."

His practices included the use of pylons and simple drills that would have looked silly to North Americans, but to the Russians they had great meaning as they looked to perfect each skill. While performing these, he had his players in constant motion. He called this the assembly method.

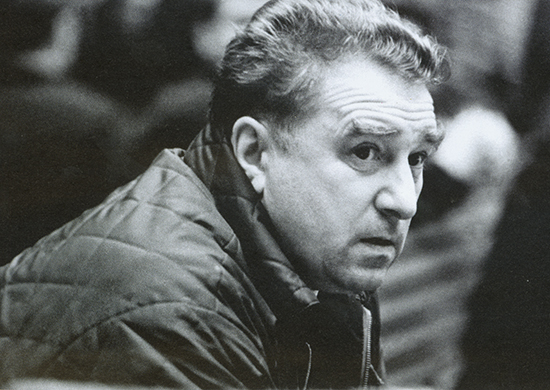
Tarasov coaching hockey

Tarasov was a player-coach for HC CSKA Moscow in the late 1940s and early 1950s, and coached notable players, including Boris Afanasiev, Aleksandr Komarov, Grigory Mkrtychan, Nikolai Sologubov, Andrey Starovoytov, and Dmitry Ukolov. Many great players developed under his system in the 1960s. Among these were: Vitaly Davydov, Anatoli Firsov, Vyacheslav Starshinov, Veniamin Alexandrov, Alexander Ragulin, Alexander Yakushev, Konstantin Loktev, and goalie, Viktor Konovalenko. They were followed by other great players who would represent the Soviet Union in the 1972 Summit Series against Canada, including Boris Mikhailov, Vladimir Petrov, Valeri Vasiliev, Alexander Maltsev, Valeri Kharlamov, Viacheslav Fetisov, and a brilliant young goaltender named Vladislav Tretiak.

Tarasov was a big factor in the development of Tretiak, who was destined to become one of the most skillful and cherished goalies in international history. In the earliest days of his career, Tarasov had him doing three practices a day as hard as possible while using the maximum consumption of oxygen (MCO).

According to Tretiak, "If I let in just one puck, Tarasov would ask me the next day "What's the matter?" If it was my fault (and it usually appears to be the goalkeeper's fault), my punishment would follow immediately. After everybody else had gone home I had to do hundreds of lunges and somersaults. I could have cheated and not done them at all, since nobody was watching me—the coaches had gone home too! But I wouldn't even have considered doing one less lunge or somersault. I trusted Tarasov, trusted his every word, even when he criticized me for letting the pucks in my net during practice."

At CSKA Moscow, he won 19 Soviet titles, including all but five from 1955 to 1975 and three instances of winning four titles in a row. He helped lead the Soviet national team to 9 straight world championships, including 3 Olympic gold medals (for most of his tenure, the Olympic championship was considered the world championship). After the 1972 Winter Olympics, Tarasov was fired. Tarasov was known for his ruthless training methods, tough discipline among his players, and innovative, instinctive decisions. Many of his methods are continued by his daughter Tatiana Tarasova.

He died in 1995 after a long illness.

== Legacy ==
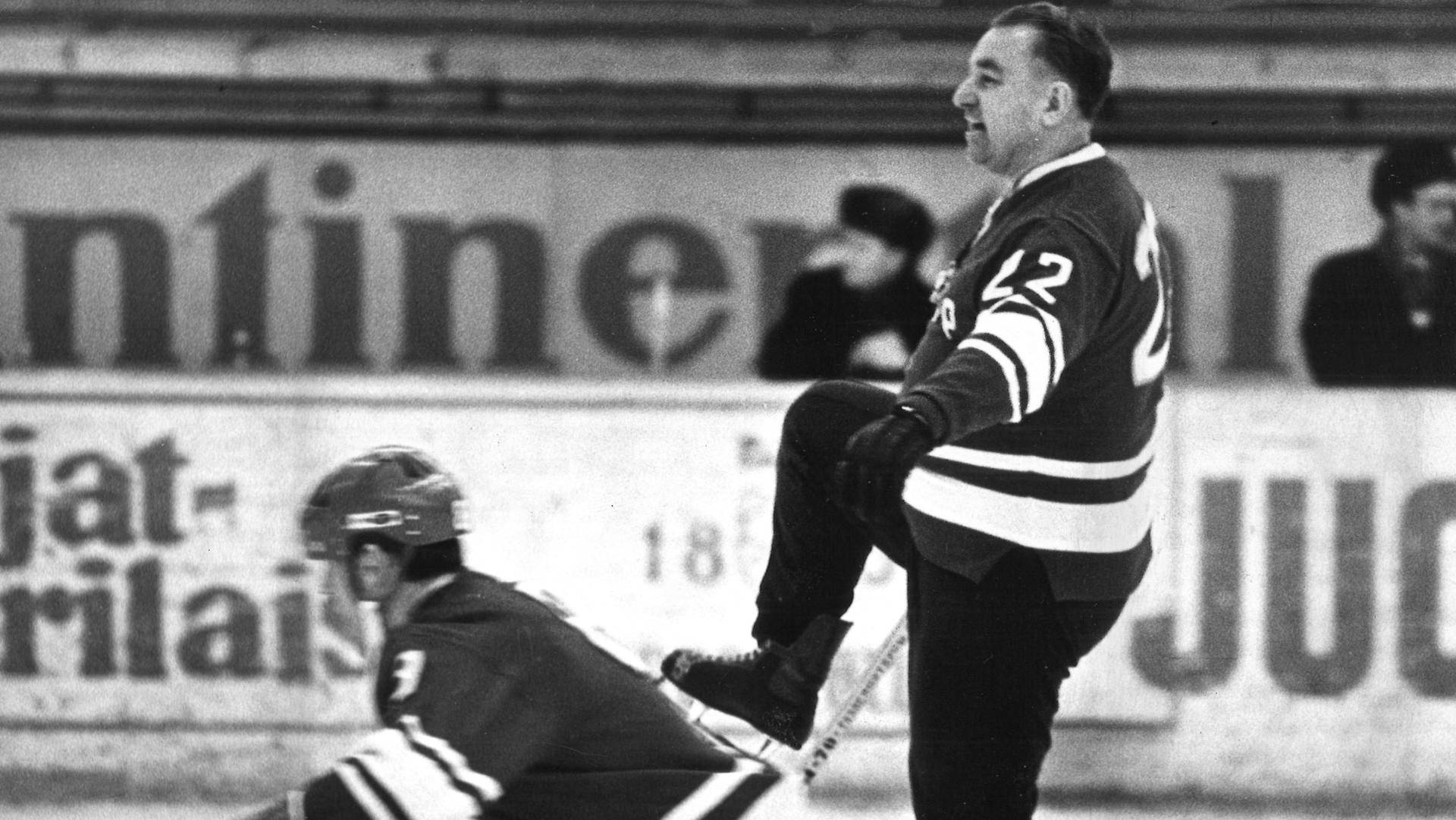
Anatoly Tarasov coaching a Soviet player in Tampere, Finland, in 1970.

Tarasov was inducted into the inaugural class of the IIHF Hall of Fame in 1997. Having helped to build the Soviet hockey program from scratch, he became the first Soviet man to be enshrined in the Hockey Hall of Fame in Toronto as a builder. He posthumously received the Wayne Gretzky International Award in 2008.

U.S. coach Lou Vairo attended a clinic by Tarasov in 1972 and stated, "He told me you don't coach with your feet, you coach with your heart and your brain, and you have to have leadership qualities, drive the boys, work them hard, but do everything you can to support them".

Today, the Russia-based Kontinental Hockey League has a division bearing his name, in recognition of his role in the development of ice hockey in the country.

When referencing Canada, the Soviet Union's long-time rival, Tarasov famously said "the Canadians battled with the ferocity and intensity of a cornered animal". "Our players were better conditioned physically and stronger in skills than the Canadian professionals. But we could not match them in heart and desire, always the strongest part of the Canadian game".

On 10 December 2019, Google celebrated his 101st birthday with a Google Doodle.

== Bibliography ==
- Anatoly Tarasov (1971). Ice Hockey of the Future (in Russian). Moscow: Fizkultura i sport. Archived from the original on 30 June 2007.
