= Kim Jong-sun =

South Korean speed skater (born 1931)

Personal information
- Nationality: South Korean
- Born: 23 January 1931 (age 94)

Sport
- Sport: Speed skating

Kim Jong-sun (born 23 January 1931) is a South Korean former speed skater. He competed in three events at the 1956 Winter Olympics.
