= 1950 Sverdlovsk plane crash =

Soviet Air Force crash near Yekaterinburg, Russia

Coordinates: 56.837814°N 60.596842°E

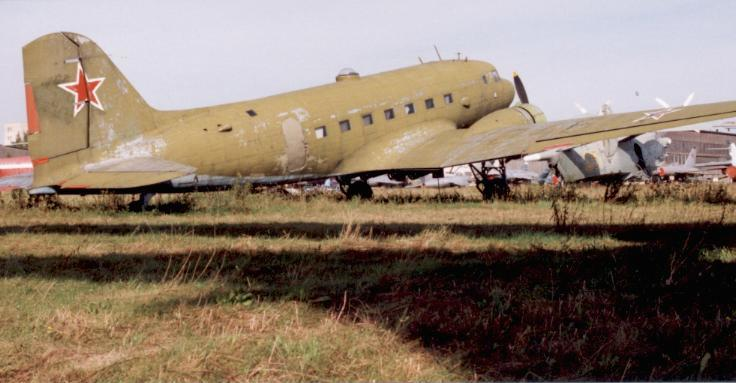
- A Li-2 similar to the accident aircraft

Accident
- Date: 7 January 1950
- Summary: Crashed in adverse weather
- Site: Koltsovo Airport, Sverdlovsk, USSR

Aircraft
- Aircraft type: Lisunov Li-2 (license-built DC-3)
- Operator: Soviet Air Forces
- Registration: 42 Red
- Flight origin: Vnukovo Airport, Moscow, USSR
- Destination: Chelyabinsk Airport, Chelyabinsk
- Occupants: 19
- Passengers: 13
- Crew: 6
- Fatalities: 19
- Survivors: 0

The Sverdlovsk plane crash of 7 January 1950 killed all 19 people on board, including almost the entire ice hockey team (VVS Moscow) of the Soviet Air Forces – 11 players, as well as a team doctor and a masseur. The team was on board a twin-engined Lisunov Li-2 transport aircraft, a licensed Soviet-built version of the DC-3, heading to a match against Dzerzhinets Chelyabinsk. Due to poor weather at Chelyabinsk, the flight diverted to Sverdlovsk. The crew attempted four approaches but during the fifth approach to Koltsovo Airport the aircraft crashed near the airport in a heavy snowstorm with strong winds. (Some sources report the crash date as 5 January 1950.)

Among those killed in the crash was goalkeeper Harijs Mellups.

== Aftermath ==
The crash was covered up by Vasily Stalin, the son of Joseph Stalin and the team's manager, who immediately recruited a new team without his father's knowledge.

== See also ==
- List of accidents involving sports teams
