= HC Dynamo Moscow =

Russian professional ice hockey club based in Moscow

Dynamo Moscow
- Nickname: White and Blues, Wolves
- City: Moscow, Russia
- League: KHL 2008–present: RSL 1996–2008; IHL 1992–1996; Soviet League Class A 1946–1992
- Conference: Western
- Division: Tarasov
- Founded: 22 December 1946; 79 years ago
- Home arena: VTB Arena (capacity: 10,523)
- Colours: Blue, white
- Head coach: Leonids Tambijevs
- Captain: Igor Ozhiganov
- Affiliates: Dynamo St. Petersburg (VHL); MHC Dynamo (MHL)
- Website: dynamo.ru
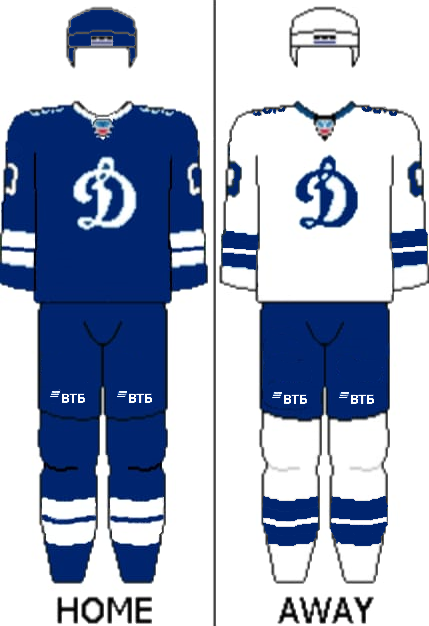

Franchise history
- HC Dynamo Moscow 1946–present

HC Dynamo Moscow (Russian: ХК Динамо Москва) is a professional ice hockey club based in Moscow, Russia. It is a member of the Tarasov Division in the Kontinental Hockey League (KHL).

Dynamo has won the Gagarin Cup twice, in 2011–12 and 2012–13 seasons, and won the regular season championship once, in 2013–14, winning the Continental Cup.

The club is one of the most successful teams in Russia.

== History ==
The team was founded in 1946 and belonged the Dynamo Moscow sports club, a part of Dynamo sports society sponsored by the Soviet Ministry of Interior and the national security structures including the KGB. It won the first Soviet hockey championship in 1946–47, beating Spartak Moscow in the finals. Helmed by Arkady Chernyshev during the first decades of its history, Dynamo established itself as one of the top teams of the Soviet hockey league. Throughout the Soviet era, Dynamo was among the top three teams almost every season, winning five championships and three USSR Cups. The last years of the Soviet hockey championship and the beginning of the IHL period were marked with Dynamo winning four seasons in a row and ending decades of dominance by CSKA Moscow.

=== Merger with HC MVD ===
In 2010, Dynamo Moscow merged with HC MVD, a KHL team from Balashikha owned by the Ministry of Internal Affairs (MVD). The team continued the history of the Dynamo club, with the majority of its roster and executives from HC MVD. The new club was officially called United Hockey Club (UHC) Dynamo Moscow, and for one season the new club was referred to as UHC Dynamo, then for a couple years as UHC Dynamo Moscow, but in 2012 the official name of the club was reverted to Hockey Club Dynamo Moscow.

In 2013 Dynamo Moscow had tried to recruit Alexander Ovechkin who played for them from 2001 to 2005, but switched to the Washington Capitals soon after.

=== Debt problems/KHL sanctions ===
Under the guidance of director and president, Andrei Safronov, HC Dynamo was reported to have amassed a debt of 2 billion rubles (US$33 million) following the 2016–17 season. With concerns from the governing body of the KHL, Dynamo were ordered to give a presentation as to how they would be funded in the following season on 24 May 2017.

As a branch of the Dynamo Moscow sporting club, the parent company board opted to remove Safronov, citing a breach of trust with sponsors and took control of the hockey club. Dynamo then refused to pay back the debt, citing it wasn't their responsibility, putting the onus on former CEO Safronov to repay the debt due to his mismanagement. With allegations of embezzlement, HC Dynamo's offices were raided by police in order to retrieve accounting documentation on 2 June 2017. With the players having not been paid in three months, former HC Dynamo board led by Safronov declared bankruptcy in order to escape the debt.

On 4 July 2017, at a KHL board meeting, the Disciplinary Committee took action with Dynamo's failure to meet contractual obligations by declaring all 42 players under contract with Dynamo as free agents.

== Honours ==
=== Domestic competitions ===
(gold) Soviet League Championship (5): 1946–47, 1953–54, 1989–90, 1990–91, 1991–92

(gold) USSR Cup (3): 1953, 1972, 1976

(gold) IHL Championship (2): 1992–93, 1994–95

(gold) IHL Cup (1): 1996

(gold) Russian Superleague (2): 1999–00, 2004–05

=== Kontinental Hockey League ===
(gold) Gagarin Cup (2): 2011–12, 2012–13

(gold) Continental Cup (2): 2013–14, 2023–24

(gold) Opening Cup (3): 2010–11, 2012–13, 2013–14

=== Europe ===
(gold) IIHF European Champions Cup (1): 2006

(silver) IIHF Continental Cup (1): 2004–05

(gold) Spengler Cup (2): 1983, 2008

(gold) Lugano Cup (1): 1991

(gold) Ahearne Cup (2): 1975, 1976

(gold) Tampere Cup (2): 1991, 1992

== Season-by-season KHL record ==
Note: GP = Games played, W = Wins, L = Losses, T = Ties, OTL = Overtime/shootout losses, Pts = Points, GF = Goals for, GA = Goals against

Season	GP	W	L	OTL	Pts	GF	GA	Finish	Top Scorer	Playoffs
2008–09	56	27	17	2	100	184	143	2nd, Chernyshev	Dmitry Afanasenkov (35 points: 19 G, 16 A; 56 GP)	Lost in Semifinals, 2–4 (Ak Bars Kazan)
2009–10	56	28	16	3	101	166	151	2nd, Bobrov	Mattias Weinhandl (60 points: 26 G, 34 A; 56 GP)	Lost in Conference Quarterfinals, 1–3 (Spartak Moscow)
2010–11	54	28	16	4	96	149	131	1st, Bobrov	Konstantin Gorovikov (38 points: 11 G, 27 A; 54 GP)	Lost in Conference Quarterfinals, 2–4 (Dinamo Riga)
2011–12	54	35	15	4	105	144	115	2nd, Bobrov	Marek Kvapil (29 points: 12 G, 17 A; 53 GP)	Gagarin Cup Champions, 4–3 (Avangard Omsk)
2012–13	52	36	14	2	101	150	115	2nd, Bobrov	Alexander Ovechkin (40 points: 19 G, 21 A; 31 GP)	Gagarin Cup Champions, 4–2 (Traktor Chelyabinsk)
2013–14	54	38	11	5	115	171	113	1st, Tarasov	Maksim Karpov (34 points: 11 G, 23 A; 48 GP); Leo Komarov (34 points: 12 G, 22 A; 54 GP)	Lost in Conference Quarterfinals, 3–4 (Lokomotiv Yaroslavl)
2014–15	60	41	13	6	123	172	120	2nd, Tarasov	Kaspars Daugaviņš (37 points: 22 G, 15 A; 56 GP)	Lost in Conference Semifinals, 1–4 (SKA Saint Petersburg)
2015–16	60	35	17	8	105	167	126	4th, Tarasov	Alexei Tsvetkov (39 points: 7 G, 32 A; 58 GP)	Lost in Conference Semifinals, 2–4 (SKA Saint Petersburg)
2016–17	60	39	16	5	112	164	111	2nd, Tarasov	Mārtiņš Karsums (34 points: 16 G, 18 A; 52 GP)	Lost in Conference Semifinals, 1–4 (SKA Saint Petersburg)
2017–18	56	28	23	5	80	134	139	6th, Tarasov	Ilya Nikulin (27 points: 12 G, 15 A; 56 GP)	did not qualify
2018–19	62	33	23	6	72	153	139	3rd, Bobrov	Vadim Shipachyov (68 points: 20 G, 48 A; 61 GP)	Lost in Conference Semifinals, 1–4 (CSKA Moscow)
2019–20	62	37	17	8	82	182	144	3rd, Bobrov	Vadim Shipachyov (65 points: 17 G, 48 A; 61 GP)	Won in Conference Quarterfinals, 4–2 (Spartak Moscow); Playoffs cancelled due to COVID-19
2020–21	60	39	15	6	84	195	137	2nd, Tarasov	Vadim Shipachyov (67 points: 20 G, 47 A; 57 GP)	Lost in Conference Semifinals, 1–4 (SKA Saint Petersburg)
2021–22	48	30	14	4	64	159	119	2nd, Tarasov	Vadim Shipachyov (67 points: 24 G, 43 A; 48 GP)	Lost in Conference Semifinals, 0–4 (CSKA Moscow)
2022–23	68	38	19	11	87	174	147	3rd, Tarasov	Jordan Weal (43 points: 14 G, 29 A; 62 GP)	Lost in Conference Quarterfinals, 2–4 (Torpedo Nizhny Novgorod)
2023–24	68	46	16	6	98	215	160	1st, Tarasov	Nikita Gusev (89 points: 23 G, 66 A; 68 GP)	Lost in Quarterfinals, 0–4 (Traktor Chelyabinsk)
2024–25	68	42	21	5	89	204	167	2nd, Tarasov	Nikita Gusev (69 points: 29 G, 40 A; 68 GP)	Lost in Semifinals, 1–4 (Traktor Chelyabinsk)
2025–26	68	36	25	5	81	188	174	5th, Tarasov	Nikita Gusev (55 points: 17 G, 38 A; 66 GP); Jordan Weal (55 points: 14 G, 41 A; 67 GP)	Lost in Last 16, 0–4 (Dinamo Minsk)

== Players ==
=== Current roster ===
Updated 13 April 2026.

No.	Nat	Player	Pos	S/G	Age	Acquired	Birthplace
44	(Russia)	Kirill Adamchuk	D	L	32	2024	Tyumen, Russia
47	(Russia)	Artyom Bondar	RW	R	20	2024	Smolensk, Russia
12	(Russia)	Artyom Chernov	C	L	29	2024	St. Petersburg, Russia
33	(Sweden)	Fredrik Claesson	D	L	33	2025	Stockholm, Sweden
10	(Canada)	Maxime Comtois	LW	L	27	2024	Longueuil, Quebec, Canada
15	(Russia)	Daniil Davydov	C	L	22	2025	St. Petersburg, Russia
71	(Russia)	Semyon Der-Arguchintsev	C	R	26	2025	Moscow, Russia
42	(Russia)	Ansel Galimov	RW	L	35	2025	Nizhnekamsk, Russian SFSR
41	(Belarus)	Kirill Gotovets	D	L	35	2022	Minsk, Belarusian SSR
97	(Russia)	Nikita Gusev	LW	R	34	2023	Moscow, Russia
34	(Russia)	Artem Ilyenko (A)	C	L	30	2023	Yaroslavl, Russia
4	(Russia)	Roman Kalinichenko	D	L	26	2025	Moscow, Russia
32	(Russia)	Timur Kol	D	L	20	2025	Moscow, Russia
85	(Russia)	Pavel Kudryavtsev	LW	R	29	2025	Yaroslavl, Russia
13	(Russia)	Artyom Mikheyev	C	L	31	2024	Kazan, Russia
99	(Russia)	Maxim Motorygin	G	L	23	2023	Voronezh, Russia
79	(Russia)	Andrei Nikonov	LW	L	23	2026	Cheboksary, Russia
92	(Russia)	Igor Ozhiganov (C)	D	R	33	2023	Krasnogorsk, Russian SFSR
18	(Canada)	Cedric Paquette (A)	C	L	33	2023	Gaspe, Quebec, Canada
75	(Russia)	Mario Patalakha	D	L	21	2023	Paris, France
59	(Russia)	Vladislav Podyapolsky	G	L	31	2024	Novokuznetsk, Russia
22	(Canada)	Luka Profaca	D	R	24	2026	Mississauga, Ontario, Canada
25	(Russia)	Daniil Prokhorov	RW	L	19	2025	Krasnodar, Russia
45	(Russia)	Daniil Pylenkov	D	L	25	2023	Yegoryevsk, Russia
87	(Russia)	Yegor Rimashevsky	RW	L	21	2023	Zhlobin, Belarus
93	(Russia)	Artyom Sergeyev	D	R	33	2024	Moscow, Russia
96	(Russia)	Magomed Sharakanov	D	L	21	2023	St. Petersburg, Russia
57	(Russia)	Artyom Shvets-Rogovoy	C	L	31	2024	Saratov, Russia
90	(Canada)	Dylan Sikura	LW	L	31	2024	Aurora, Ontario, Canada
91	(Canada)	Jordan Weal	C	R	34	2022	North Vancouver, British Columbia, Canada
19	(Russia)	Ivan Zinchenko	C	L	24	2026	Rostov-na-Donu, Russia

=== IIHF Hall-of-Famers ===
Players

- Aleksandr Maltsev, LW, 1967–84, inducted 1999
- Vladimir Yurzinov, C, 1957–72, inducted 2002
- Valeri Vasiliev, D, 1967–84, inducted 1998

Builders

- Arkady Chernyshev, Coach, 1946–74, inducted 1999
- Vladimir Yurzinov, Coach, 1974–79, 1989–92 inducted 2002

Logo used from 2010–2017.

Logo used from 2008–2010

=== Honoured members ===
Dynamo Moscow has honoured 25 players and one coach in its history.

HC Dynamo Moscow honoured members
# ^{1}	Player	Position	Career
Coach	Arkady Chernyshev	N/A	1946–74
1	Boris Zaitsev	G	1957–70
1	Vladimir Myshkin	G	1980–90
2	Oleg Tolmachev	D	1987–04
2	Pavel Zhiburtovich	D	1955–62
3	Vitaly Davydov	RW	1957–73
5	Stanislav Petukhov	RW	1956–68
5	Vasily Pervukhin	D	1976–89
6	Valery Vasiliev	D	1967–84
6	Alexander Karpovtsev	D	1987–94
8	Valentin Kuzin	LW	1950–61
8	Aleksandr Golikov	F	1976–83
9	Nikolay Postavnin	F	1946–51
9	Alexander Uvarov	C	1948–60
9	Anatoli Semenov	C	1979–90
10	Yuri Krylov	RW	1951–65
10	Vladimir Golikov	C	1977–85
11	Yuri Volkov	LW	1996–99
11	Alexander Maltsev	C	1967–84
12	Igor Korolev	C	1988–92
14	Sergei Svetlov	F	1978–89
17	Vladimir Yurzinov	C	1957–72
17	Zinetula Bilyaletdinov	D	1973–88
26	Alexei Zhamnov	C	1988–92
29	Mikhail Shtalenkov	G	1986–92
30	Sergei Yashin	F	1980–90

Notes

- ^{1} Russian clubs tend to hang a banner of honour with a player's jersey number (sometimes multiple players per number), while still keeping the number in circulation.

=== Head coaches ===
- Arkady Chernyshev, 1946–74
- Vladimir Yurzinov, 1974–79
- Vitaly Davydov, 1979–81
- Vladimir Kiselev, 1981–83
- Igor Tuzik, 1983–84
- Yuri Moiseev, 1984–89
- Vladimir Yurzinov, 1989–92
- Petr Vorobiev, 1992–93
- Igor Tuzik, 1993–94
- Vladimir Golubović, 1994–96
- Yuri Ochnev, 1996–97
- Alexander Volchkov, 1996–98
- Zinetula Bilyaletdinov, 1997–00
- Vladimir Semenov, 2000–02
- Zinetula Bilyaletdinov, 2002–04
- Vladimir Krikunov, 2004–07
- Vladimir Vůjtek, 2007–09
- Sergei Kotov, 2009
- Andrei Khomutov, 2009–10
- Oleg Znarok, 2010–14
- Harijs Vītoliņš, 2014–15
- Sergei Oreshkin, 2015–17
- Vladimir Vorobiev, 2017–18
- Vladimir Krikunov, 2018–21
- Alexei Kudashov, 2021–2025
- Vyacheslav Kozlov, 2025–present

=== Franchise records ===
- Most championship titles: Igor Dorofeyev, 5
- Most games, career: Sergei Vyshedkevich, 657
- Most points, career: Alexander Maltsev, 633
- Most goals, career: Alexander Maltsev, 329
- Most assists, career: Alexander Maltsev, 304
- Most penalty minutes, career: Sergei Vyshedkevich, 745
- Most points, season: Nikita Gusev, 89
- Most goals, season: Alexander Maltsev, 36
- Most assists, season: Nikita Gusev, 66
- Most penalty minutes, season: Petr Čajánek, 123
- Most goals, game: Alexander Uvarov, 6
- Most assists, game: Sergey Yashin, 4
- Most penalty minutes, game: Alexander Zhurik, 34
- Fastest goal from start of a game: Alexei Kalyuzhny, 0:08

== See also ==
- Dynamo Sports Club
