= Valentin Kuzin =

Soviet ice hockey player

Olympic medal record

Men's Ice hockey

Representing Soviet Union
Gold medal – first place	1956 Cortina d'Ampezzo	Ice hockey

Valentin Egorevich Kuzin (Russian: Валентин Егорович Кузин; September 23, 1926 in Novosibirsk, Soviet Union - August 13, 1994) was a Soviet ice hockey player who played in the Soviet Championship League with HC Dynamo Moscow. He also played for the Soviet national team at the 1956 Winter Olympics, where he won a gold medal He was inducted into the Russian and Soviet Hockey Hall of Fame in 1954.
