= Yuri Pantyukhov =

Russian ice hockey player

- Born: March 15, 1931 Moscow, Soviet Union
- Died: October 22, 1982 (aged 51)
- Height: 5 ft 9 in (175 cm)
- Weight: 166 lb (75 kg; 11 st 12 lb)
- Position: Right wing
- Shot: Left
- Played for: Krylya Sovetov Moscow; VVS Moscow; CSKA Moscow; SKA Leningrad
- National team: Soviet Union
- Playing career: 1949–1962
Medal record
Men's Ice hockey
Representing Soviet Union
Gold medal – first place	1956 Cortina d'Ampezzo	Ice hockey

Yuri Borisovich Pantyukhov (15 March 1931 – 22 October 1982) was a Russian ice hockey player. He played in 68 games for the Soviet Union national team from 1955 to 1959, scoring 32 goals, and was a member of the national team that won the ice hockey gold medal at the 1956 Winter Olympics.

Pantyukhov played in the Soviet Hockey League for HC CSKA Moscow and Krylya Sovetov Moscow, scoring 121 goals in 230 appearances.

He was born in Moscow, Soviet Union, and inducted into the Russian and Soviet Hockey Hall of Fame in 1956.
