= Vitali Davydov =

Russian ice hockey player (born 1939)

- Born: 1 April 1939 (age 87) Moscow, Russian SFSR, Soviet Union
- Height: 5 ft 8 in (173 cm)
- Weight: 160 lb (73 kg; 11 st 6 lb)
- Position: Defence
- Shot: Left
- Played for: Dynamo Moscow
- National team: Soviet Union
- Playing career: 1957–1973
Medal record
Men's ice hockey
Representing Soviet Union
Olympic Games
Gold medal – first place	1964 Innsbruck	Team
Gold medal – first place	1968 Grenoble	Team
Gold medal – first place	1972 Sapporo	Team

Vitali Semyonovich Davydov (Russian: Виталий Семенович Давыдов), born 1 April 1939 in Moscow, is a retired Russian ice hockey player who spent his entire club career with HC Dynamo Moscow of the Top Soviet Hockey Championship. On the international stage, he won three Olympic gold medals and nine Ice Hockey World Championships titles. He was inducted into the Russian and Soviet Hockey Hall of Fame in 1963. He was inducted into the IIHF Hall of Fame in 2004.
