= Sven Andersson (footballer, born 1945) =

Swedish footballer

Personal information
- Date of birth: 18 April 1945 (age 81)
- Position: Defender

Senior career*
Years	Team	Apps	(Gls)
1966–1974	IF Elfsborg		
1975	Norrby IF		

International career
1967–1968	Sweden	3	(0)

Managerial career
- 1987: IF Elfsborg
- * Club domestic league appearances and goals

Sven Andersson (born 18 April 1945) is a Swedish football defender who mostly played for IF Elfsborg and was capped three times for Sweden.
