= Yuri Mikhaylov =

Soviet speed skater

Olympic medal record

Representing the Soviet Union

Men's speed skating

Olympic Games
Gold medal – first place	1956 Cortina d'Ampezzo	1500 m

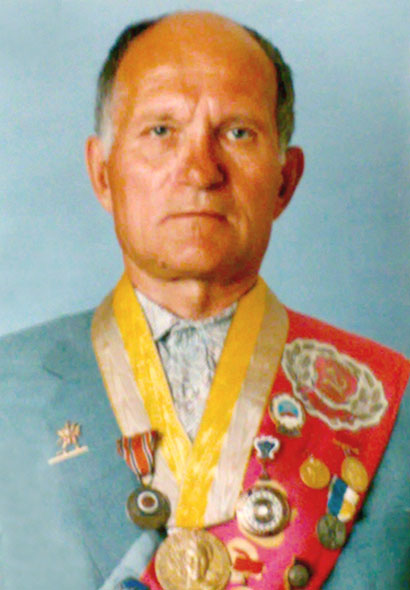
Portrait of Yuri Matveyevich Mikhaylov

Yuri Matveyevich Mikhaylov (Russian: Ю́рий Матве́евич Миха́йлов) (25 July 1930 in Ulitino, Russia – 15 July 2008 Tver, Russia) was a speed skater who competed for the Soviet Union.

Born in the village of Ulitino in Staritsky District of Tver Oblast, Yuri Mikhaylov took up boxing when he was young and in 1949, he became champion of Kalininsky District of Tver Oblast. At the country's Junior Championships, he then won a bronze medal and it seemed that Mikhaylov had a nice future in boxing ahead of him. Besides liking boxing in itself, Mikhaylov also very much liked the exercises his trainer made him do, which included elements of athletics, bicycle racing, gymnastics, and more. But then his trainer left and Mikhaylov's new trainer forced him to do only boxing exercises. This made Mikhaylov lose interest in boxing.

Mikhaylov then decided to try skating. Originally, he skated only to keep occupied doing something that would exercise his muscles, but he soon fell in love with skating and became obsessed, dreaming about skating and unable to refrain from skating even a single day. But in 1951, he had to join the army. In the army, he was bored and he missed skating, drawing pictures of skates in letters he wrote. After having been demobilised, Mikhaylov, even more obsessed with skating than before, trained furiously and made up for all the skating he had missed while in the army.

He soon started to win medals at regional championships and he made his debut at the Soviet Allround Championships in 1954, skating only his favourite distance (the 1500 m) in which he finished 4th. Early 1955, during races on the Medeo rink of Alma-Ata, he finished 2nd on the 1500 m behind Yevgeny Grishin who won the 1500 m in a new world-record time. At the Soviet Allround Championships that year, Mikhaylov finished 6th, while finishing second on the 1500 m behind Boris Shilkov.

Mikhaylov's best year came in 1956. During races in Davos, he broke Grishin's 1500 m world record. At the 1956 Winter Olympics in Cortina d'Ampezzo, he participated in the 500 m, but he fell and did not finish. Two days later was the day of his favourite distance, the 1500 m and – ten days after Mikhaylov had become the 1500 m world record holder – he watched Grishin finish his 1500 m in a new world-record time of 2:08.6. In the next pair, Mikhaylov equalled Grishin's time and they shared Olympic gold. Later that year, he won silver at the Soviet Allround Championships, finishing first on the 1500 m. Although Mikhaylov remained active as a skater until 1961, he won no more major medals.

== World records ==
Over the course of his career, Mikhaylov skated two world records:

Discipline	Time	Date	Location
1500 m	2:09.1	20 January 1956	(Switzerland) Davos
1500 m	2:08.6	30 January 1956	(Italy) Misurina

Source: SpeedSkatingStats.com
