= Sven Andersson (speed skater) =

Swedish speed skater

Personal information
- Born: August 21, 1921 Karlskoga, Sweden
- Died: May 3, 2016 (aged 94)

Sport
- Country: Sweden
- Sport: speed skating
- Events: men's 5000 metres; men's 10,000 metres

Sven Gustav Andersson (August 21, 1921 – May 3, 2016) was a Swedish speed skater who competed at the 1956 Winter Olympics in Cortina d'Ampezzo. Participating in two events, he finished 22nd in a field of 46 competitors in the men's 5000 metres and 13th out of 32 skaters in the men's 10,000 metres. He was born in Karlskoga and competed out of Bofors Cykelklubb.
