= Ivan Tregubov =

Soviet ice hockey player

- Born: January 19, 1930 Mordovian ASSR, Soviet Union
- Died: September 1, 1992 (aged 62)
- Position: Defence
- Played for: HC CSKA Moscow; SKA Kuibyshev; Khimik Voskresensk
Medal record
Men's ice hockey
Representing Soviet Union
Gold medal – first place	1956 Cortina d'Ampezzo	Team

Ivan Sergeyevich Tregubov (Russian: Иван Серге́евич Трегубов; January 19, 1930 – September 1, 1992) was a Soviet ice hockey defenceman in the 1950s and 1960s. Tregubov was born in the Mordovian ASSR of the Russian SFSR, Soviet Union.

== Career ==
Tregubov played for HC CSKA Moscow from 1951 to 1962, SKA Kuibyshev from 1962 to 1964, and Khimik Voskresensk in 1964 and 1965. He was named to the Soviet all-star team four consecutive years beginning in 1955. He was inducted into the USSR Hall of Fame in 1956.

Tregubov played 100 games for the national team. He played in six Ice Hockey World Championships, being named the best defenceman in 1958 and 1961. He won the 1956 Olympic and World Championship gold in 1956, as well as World Championship silver four times and bronze once.

== Sources ==
- IIHF Directorate awards
- CCCP International
