= Ulitino =

Ulitino (Russian: Улитино) is the name of several rural localities in Russia:

- Ulitino, Arkhangelsk Oblast, a settlement in Yarnemsky Selsoviet of Plesetsky District in Arkhangelsk Oblast
- Ulitino, Odintsovsky District, Moscow Oblast, a village in Yershovskoye Rural Settlement of Odintsovsky District in Moscow Oblast
- Ulitino, Pavlovo-Posadsky District, Moscow Oblast, a village in Ulitinskoye Rural Settlement of Pavlovo-Posadsky District in Moscow Oblast
- Ulitino, Republic of Tatarstan, a village in Zelenodolsky District of the Republic of Tatarstan
- Ulitino, Staritsky District, Tver Oblast, a village in Arkhangelskoye Rural Settlement of Staritsky District in Tver Oblast
- Ulitino, Vesyegonsky District, Tver Oblast, a village in Yegonskoye Rural Settlement of Vesyegonsky District in Tver Oblast
- Ulitino, Yaroslavl Oblast, a village in Blagoveshchensky Rural Okrug of Bolsheselsky District in Yaroslavl Oblast
