= Yuri Krylov =

- Born: March 11, 1930 Krasnogorsk, Soviet Union
- Died: November 4, 1979 (aged 49) Moscow, Soviet Union
- Position: Left wing
- Shot: Left
- National team: Soviet Union
- Playing career: 1951–1965
Medal record
Olympic Games
| Gold medal – first place | 1956 Cortina d'Ampezzo | Team |

Yuri Nikolaevich Krylov (Russian: Юрий Николаевич Крылов; March 11, 1930 in Krasnogorsk, Soviet Union – November 4, 1979) was an ice hockey player who played in the Soviet Championship League for HC Dynamo Moscow. Internationally he played for the Soviet national team at the 1956 Winter Olympics, winning the gold medal. He was inducted into the Russian and Soviet Hockey Hall of Fame in 1954.
