= Sarkandaugava =

Neighborhood of Riga, Latvia

Coordinates: 56.9978°N 24.1206°E

- Neighborhood of Riga
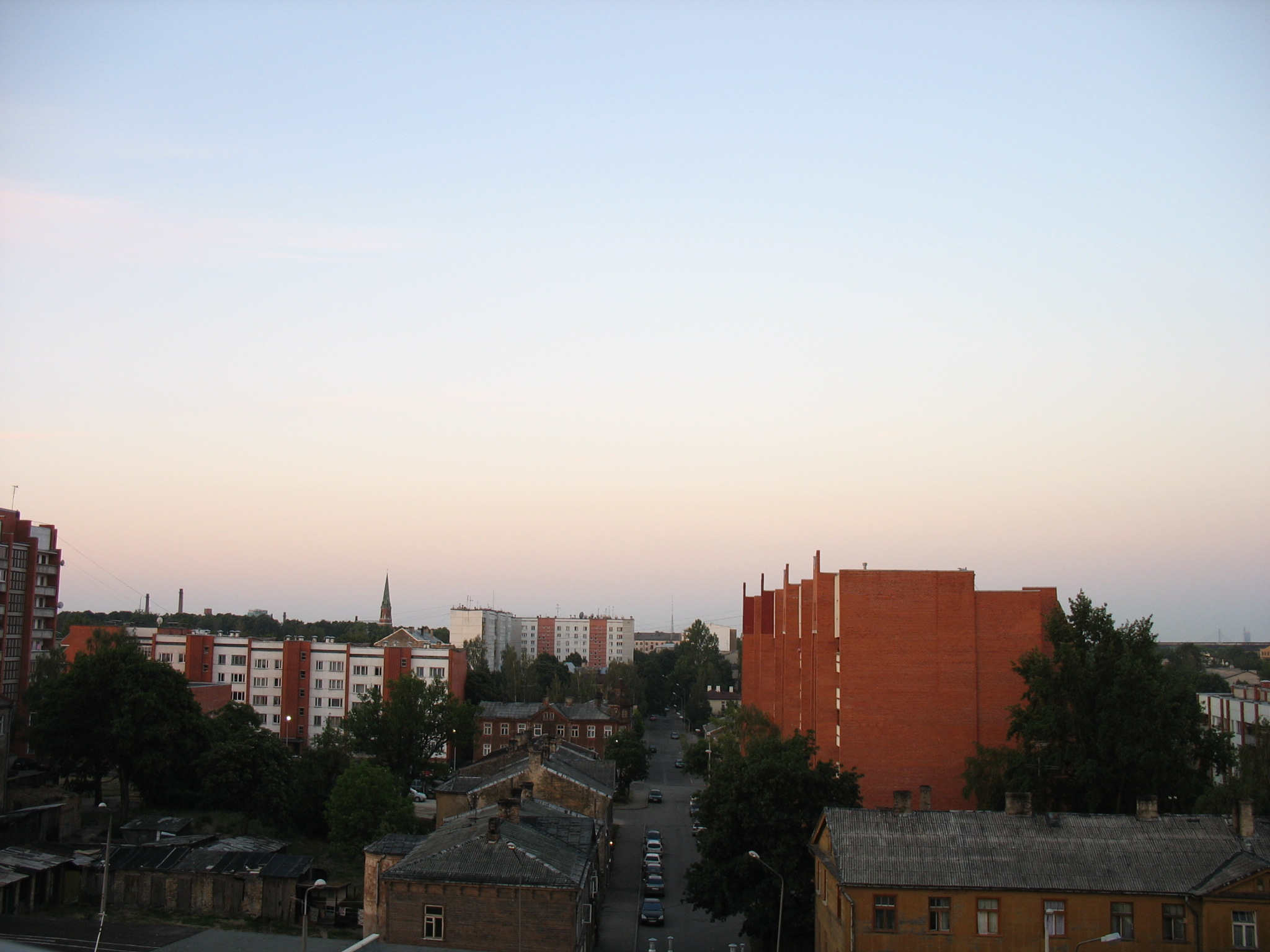

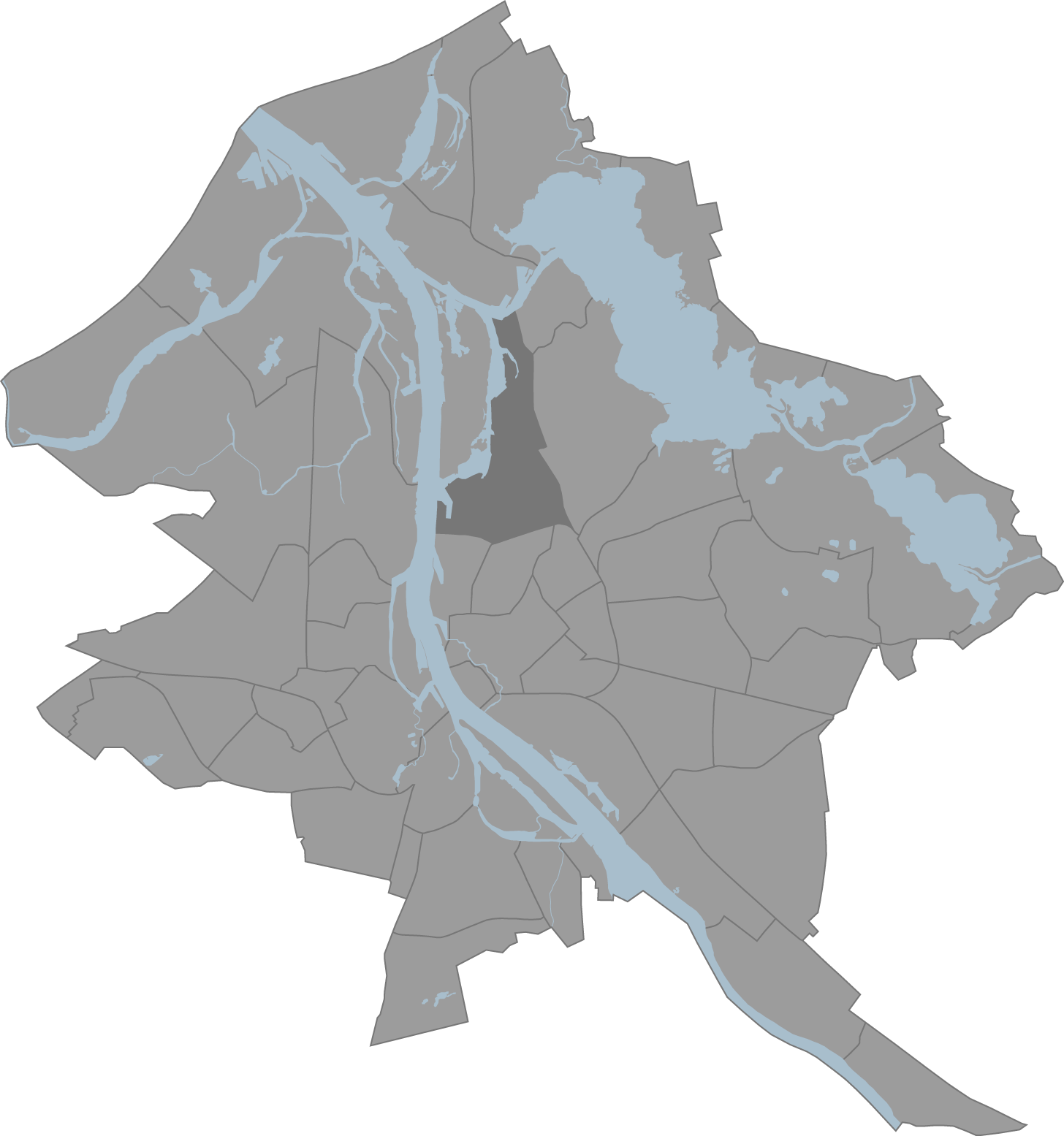
- Location of Sarkandaugava in Riga
- Country: Latvia
- City: Riga
- District: Northern District

Area
  - Total: 7.596 km^{2} (2.933 sq mi)

Population (2024)
  - Total: 15,394
  - Density: 2,027/km^{2} (5,249/sq mi)
- Time zone: UTC+2 (EET)
  - Summer (DST): UTC+3 (EEST)
- Website: https://apkaimes.lv/sarkandaugava/

Sarkandaugava is a neighbourhood of Riga, Latvia.

== Origins of the name ==
The name of the neighbourhood derives from that of the Sarkandaugava ('Red Daugava'; German: Rote Düna), a minor arm of the Daugava that formerly separated Pētersala from the mainland. As Riga developed and expanded, more and more of the Sarkandaugava was filled in, but it still appeared on maps from the late 1930s. All that remains of the Sarkandaugava today is a small, unnamed bay next to the bridge from the Tvaika street area over to Kundziņsala.

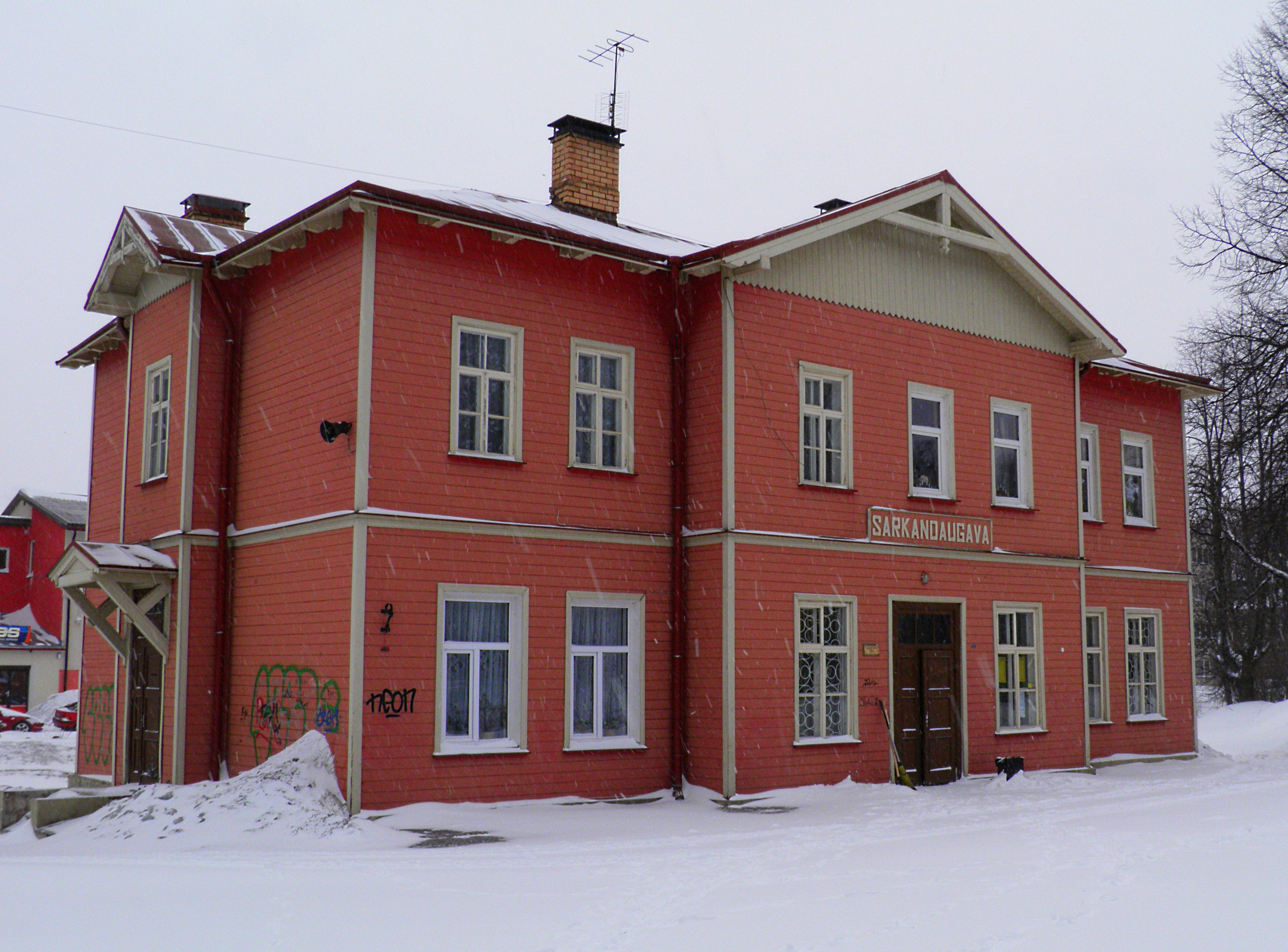
Sarkandaugava railway station
