= Boris Tsybin =

Soviet speed skater

Personal information
- Nationality: Soviet
- Born: 14 June 1928; Rzhev, Russian SFSR, Soviet Union
- Died: 7 August 2011 (aged 83); Moscow, Russia

Sport
- Sport: Speed skating

Boris Tsybin (14 June 1928 – 7 August 2011) was a Soviet speed skater. He competed in the men's 10,000 metres event at the 1956 Winter Olympics.
