= Speed skating at the 1956 Winter Olympics =

Speed skating at the VII Olympic Winter Games
- Pictogram for speed skating
- Venue: Lake Misurina
- Date: 28–31 January 1956
- No. of events: 4
- Competitors: 83 from 17 nations

At the 1956 Winter Olympics, four speed skating events were contested. This was the last edition in which only men participated. The competitions were held from Saturday, 28 January, to Tuesday, 31 January 1956.

== Medal summary ==
Event	Gold		Silver		Bronze	
500 metres	Yevgeny Grishin; Soviet Union	40.2 WR	Rafayel Grach; Soviet Union	40.8	Alv Gjestvang; Norway	41.0
1500 metres	Yevgeny Grishin; Soviet Union Yuri Mikhaylov; Soviet Union	2:08.6 WR			Toivo Salonen; Finland	2:09.4
5000 metres	Boris Shilkov; Soviet Union	7:48.7 (OR)	Sigvard Ericsson; Sweden	7:56.7	Oleg Goncharenko; Soviet Union	7:57.5
10,000 metres	Sigvard Ericsson; Sweden	16:35.9 (OR)	Knut Johannesen; Norway	16:36.9	Oleg Goncharenko; Soviet Union	16:42.3

== Participating nations ==
A total of 18 nations competed in the 4 events. Ten speed skaters competed in all four events.

- Australia (1)
- Austria (4)
- Belgium (1)
- Canada (3)
- Czechoslovakia (3)
- Finland (6)
- France (1)
- United Team of Germany (2)
- Great Britain (3)
- Italy (5)
- Japan (5)
- South Korea (4)
- Netherlands (6)
- Norway (11)
- Soviet Union (11)
- Sweden (7)
- Switzerland (2)
- United States (8)

== Medal table ==
Rank	Nation	Gold	Silver	Bronze	Total
1	Soviet Union	4	1	2	7
2	Sweden	1	1	0	2
3	Norway	0	1	1	2
4	Finland	0	0	1	1
Totals (4 entries)		5	3	4	12
