= Yevgeni Babich =

Soviet ice hockey player (1921–1972)

- Born: 7 January 1921 Moscow, Russian SFSR
- Died: 11 June 1972 (aged 51) Moscow, Soviet Union
- Height: 5 ft 7 in (170 cm)
- Weight: 160 lb (73 kg; 11 st 6 lb)
- Position: Right Wing
- Shot: Left
- Played for: HC CSKA Moscow
- National team: Soviet Union
- Playing career: 1946–1957

Medal record

Olympic Games

Men's Ice hockey

Representing Soviet Union
Gold medal – first place	1956 Cortina d'Ampezzo	Ice hockey

Yevgeni Makarovich Babich (7 January 1921 – 11 June 1972) was a Soviet ice hockey player who played in the Soviet Hockey League.

== Biography ==
Babich played for HC CSKA Moscow. He was inducted into the Russian and Soviet Hockey Hall of Fame in 1953.

He committed suicide by hanging at his home in 1972.
