= VVS Moscow =

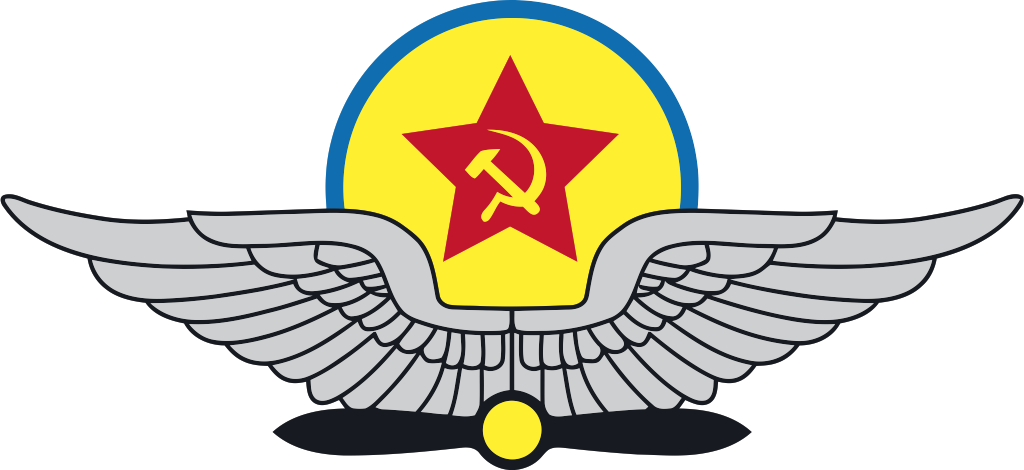
- Full name: Voenno-Vozdushnye Sily Moscow
- Nickname: "The Planes"
- Founded: 1944
- Dissolved: 1953
- 1952: Soviet Top League, 11th
| Home colours | Away colours |

VVS Moscow (Russian: Военно-Воздушные Силы (Москва) / in English: Moscow Military Air Force) was a Soviet multi-sports society (club) representing the Moscow Military District (MVO) Air Force. The club was formed in addition to the already existing MVO sports society (Moscow Military District).

The sports club was formed during the war as Aviauchilische, playing in the Moscow regional competition. At that time, the team represented an aviation military school (military gliders) that was evacuated from Moscow to Syzran. In 1944 it made their first appearance in the All-Union competition, the Soviet football cup.

Among the sports the club participated in were football, ice hockey, basketball, and volleyball. They won the Soviet national basketball league championship in 1952, as well as the Soviet national volleyball league championship in 1952, and the Soviet national ice hockey league championship three times, in the years 1951, 1952, and 1953 following the 1950 Sverdlovsk Air Disaster.

Being the commander of the MVO Air Force, Lieutenant General Vasily Stalin, the son of Joseph Stalin, was the president of the club. Vsevolod Bobrov played on the football team 1950–52 and the ice hockey team 1949–53. Viktor Tikhonov, the future Soviet national team's coach, played on the ice hockey team, as did Boris Kulagin, future coach of other Moscow-based ice hockey teams. Yevgeny Babich, otherwise a CDKA/CSKA player, played with the VVS hockey team for its three championship seasons. Ten days after Vasiliy Stalin was removed from the command of the MVO Air Force, all sports teams of the sports society were dissolved.

== Hockey team ==
In 1948–49, the VVS hockey team played in the new Soviet Championship with Anatoly Tarasov as player-coach. VVS finished second in group A in the opening phase and fifth overall. Tarasov scored 14 goals, the highest total of the season. Angry with Vasily Stalin in the next season, he quit and joined CDKA, later known as CSKA. At the end of the 1947–48 season, after the team finished seventh out of ten, Vasily Stalin brought the first line of forwards from Spartak Moscow to the team: Zdenek Zigmund, Ivan Novikov, and Yuri Tarasov. They finished second in 1948–49.

On January 7, 1950, as the team was on the way to Chelyabinsk, their airplane crashed in Yekaterinburg (then Sverdlovsk), and the only surviving players were Viktor Shuvalov and Vsevolod Bobrov, who were not on board. Bobrov overslept and took the train instead, and Shuvalov was injured. VVS finished fourth in that season.

The 1950–51 season saw the best players from other teams starting to play on VVS, and the team won the league championship. That year was also the first year of the USSR Cup, where VVS lost the final 4–3 to Krylya Sovetov, also of Moscow.

In 1951–52, VVS won another championship and the USSR Cup, beating CDSA (CDKA before, CSKA later) 3–2 in the tiebreaking game for the former and Krylya Sovetov 6–5 in the final for the latter. They won the championship again in 1952–53 despite Bobrov's injury. After Joseph Stalin died, destalinization resulted in the unceremonious dissolution of VVS.

== Football team ==
The team played in Moscow at the "Stalinets" and "Dynamo" stadiums.

During the 1952 season, VVS Moscow played alongside another football team from the Moscow Military District, Kalinin (komanda Kalinina).

The last game VVS Moscow played was on 7 April 1953, when they beat Daugava Riga 2:0.

=== History ===
| Season | Div. | Pos. | Pl. | W | D | L | GS | GA | P | Domestic Cup | Top scorer |
|---|---|---|---|---|---|---|---|---|---|---|---|
| 1944 | Moscow regional competitions | | | | | | | | | Quarterfinals | |
| 1945 | Vtoraya Gruppa (2nd) | 2 | 17 | 9 | 6 | 2 | 32 | 12 | 24 | Round of 32 | |
| 1946 | Vtoraya Gruppa, South (2nd) | 1 | 24 | 16 | 5 | 3 | 56 | 22 | 37 | Round of 16 | |
| 1947 | Pervaya Gruppa (1st) | 13 | 24 | 3 | 5 | 16 | 21 | 54 | 11 | Round of 16 | Viktor Ponomaryov (8) |
| 1948 | Pervaya Gruppa (1st) | 9 | 26 | 9 | 3 | 14 | 33 | 52 | 21 | Quarterfinal | Viktor Piskovatsky (8) |
| 1949 | Pervaya Gruppa (1st) | 8 | 34 | 13 | 9 | 12 | 48 | 42 | 35 | Round of 64 | Sergei Korshunov (12) |
| 1950 | Class A (1st) | 4 | 36 | 20 | 5 | 11 | 78 | 52 | 45 | Quarterfinal | Viktor Shuvalov (16) |
| 1951 | Class A (1st) | 10 | 28 | 11 | 4 | 13 | 44 | 56 | 26 | Semifinal | Sergei Korshunov (13) |
| 1952 | Class A (1st) | 11 | 13 | 2 | 6 | 5 | 11 | 14 | 10 | Quarterfinal | Sergei Korshunov (4) |
| 1953 | Class B (2nd) | dissolved | | | | | | | | N/A | |

=== Honours ===
- Soviet 2nd tier competition
  - Winners: 1946
  - Runners-up: 1945
- All-Union Committee of Physical Culture and Sports Tournament
  - Runners-up: 1952

== Controversies ==
In the post-war years, Vasiliy Stalin generously bestowed spacious apartments, country houses (dacha), and cars upon athletes.
