= Dmitry Sakunenko =

Russian speed skater

Dmitry Sakunenko (Russian: Дмитрий Сакуненко; 7 January 1930 – 13 September 2014) was a Russian Soviet speed skater.

At an international meet at Medeo 9–10 January 1955, Sakunenko was the first person to skate the 5000-m below eight minutes, with 7:54.9. In a later pair, Boris Shilkov improved this world record to 7:45.6. On this occasion Sakunenko set a new samalogue world record with the series 42.6, 7:54.9, 2:13.0, 16:44.3 (184.638 points). This record lasted until 1963. Sakunenko competed in the 1956 Olympics, two world championships and three European championships, with a bronze from the European championships 1955 being his best result.

== World records ==
Discipline	Time	Date	Location
Big combination	184.638	January 10, 1955	(Soviet Union) Medeo

Source: SpeedSkatingStats.com
