= Alexander Uvarov =

Russian ice hockey player

Olympic medal record

Men's Ice hockey

Representing Soviet Union
Gold medal – first place	1956 Cortina	Team

Alexander Nikolaevich Uvarov (Russian: Алекса́ндр Никола́евич Ува́ров; March 7, 1922 – December 24, 1994) was a Russian ice hockey player, who played in the Soviet Hockey League.

He was born in Odoyev, Tula region, Soviet Union.

Uvarov played 1948–1960 for HC Dynamo Moscow (259 matches, 203 goals, 21 hat-tricks) and 1954–1957 for Soviet national team.

Olympic champion 1956. World champion 1954, 1956. European champion 1954–1956. USSR champion 1954.

He was inducted into the Russian and Soviet Hockey Hall of Fame in 1954.
