= Arkady Chernyshev =

Soviet ice hockey, football and bandy player (1914–1992)

- Arkady Chernyshev

Personal information
- Full name: Arkady Ivanovich Chernyshev
- Date of birth: 16 March 1914
- Place of birth: Nizhny Novgorod, Russian Empire
- Date of death: 17 April 1992 (aged 78)
- Place of death: Moscow, Russia
- Height: 1.80 m (5 ft 11 in)
- Positions: Defender; midfielder

Senior career*
Years	Team	Apps	(Gls)
1930–1936	Serp i Molot Moscow		
1936–1944	Dynamo Moscow	84	(1)
1945–1948	Dinamo Minsk	70	(1)
- * Club domestic league appearances and goals as of 13:12, 15 October 2009 (UTC)

Arkady Ivanovich Chernyshev (Russian: Аркадий Иванович Чернышёв; March 16, 1914 – April 17, 1992) was a Russian ice hockey, football and bandy player, who played in the Soviet Top Hockey League. As a coach, he led Dynamo Moscow and the Soviet Union national ice hockey team. Chernyshev was inducted into the Russian and Soviet Hockey Hall of Fame in 1948, and the IIHF Hall of Fame in 1999.

== Career ==
Chernyshev served as Dynamo Moscow team head coach from 1946 until 1974.

Under his leadership, Dynamo Moscow won the USSR Championship title in the seasons 1946/1947 and 1953/1954.

They places second in the seasons 1949/1950, 1950/1951, 1958/1959, 1959/1960, 1961/1962, 1962/1963, 1963/1964, 1970/1971, 1971/1972.

They placed third in the seasons 1947/1948, 1948/1949, 1951/1952, 1952/1953, 1954/1955, 1955/1956, 1956/1957, 1957/1958, 1965/1966, 1966/1967, 1967/1968, 1968/1969, 1973/1974.

Soviet Cup of hockey:

Champions in the seasons 1952/1953 and 1971/1972.

Runner-up in the seasons 1954/1955, 1955/1956, 1965/1966, 1968/1969, 1969/1970, 1973/1974.

As the USSR national team head coach 1954–1957 and 1962–1972 guiding the team to:

Eleven World Championships titles (1954, 1956, 1963, 1964, 1965, 1966, 1967, 1968, 1969, 1970, 1971).

Eleven European Championship titles (1958, 1959, 1960, 1963, 1964, 1965, 1966, 1967, 1968, 1969, 1970).

Four Olympic goals medals for the Soviet Union men's national ice hockey team (1956, 1964, 1968, 1972).

The Kontinental Hockey League, a Russia-based ice hockey league, has one of its four divisions named after Chernyshev.

== Honours ==
Chernyshev was inducted into the Russian and Soviet Hockey Hall of Fame in 1948, and the IIHF Hall of Fame in 1999.

Chernyshev won three USSR football Championship titles (1937, 1940, 1947), as well as five USSR bandy Cup titles (1937, 1938, 1940, 1941, 1948).

The hockey part of VTB Arena stadium in Moscow is also named after Chernyshev.
