= Nikolai Khlystov =

Russian ice hockey player (1932–1999)

Olympic medal record

Men's Ice hockey

Representing Soviet Union
Gold medal – first place	1956 Cortina d'Ampezzo	Ice hockey

Nikolay Pavlovich Khlystov (November 10, 1932 in Moscow, Soviet Union – February 14, 1999) was a Soviet ice hockey player. He played in the Soviet Championship League for Krylya Sovetov Moscow. Internationally he played for the Soviet national team at the 1956 Winter Olympics, winning the gold medal. He was inducted into the Russian and Soviet Hockey Hall of Fame in 1954.
