= Dmitry Ukolov =

Russian ice hockey player (1929–1992)

Olympic medal record

Men's Ice hockey

Representing Soviet Union
Gold medal – first place	1956 Cortina	Team

Dmitry Matveevich Ukolov (Russian: Дмитрий Матвеевич Уколов; October 23, 1929 – November 25, 1992) was a Russian ice hockey player who played in the Soviet Hockey League.

He was born in Moscow, Soviet Union.

Ukolov played for HC CSKA Moscow and was inducted into the Russian and Soviet Hockey Hall of Fame in 1954.
