= Viktor Shuvalov =

Russian ice hockey player (1923–2021)

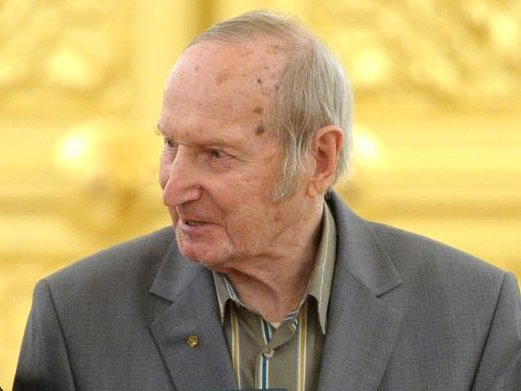
- Shuvalov in 2014

Medal record

Men's Ice hockey

Representing Soviet Union
Gold medal – first place	1956 Cortina d'Ampezzo	Ice hockey

Viktor Grigoryevich Shuvalov (Russian: Виктор Григорьевич Шувалов; 15 December 1923 – 18 April 2021) was an ice hockey player who played in the Soviet Hockey League. He was born in the Republic of Mordovia, Russian SFSR, Soviet Union.

== Biography ==
Shuvalov was born in the Republic of Mordovia; sources vary on whether his birthplace was Nabornye Syresi or Ruzayevka.

Shuvalov played for HC CSKA Moscow. He was inducted into the Russian and Soviet Hockey Hall of Fame in 1953. He also played soccer in the Soviet Top League for VVS Moscow from 1950 to 1952. Shuvalov died from COVID-19 in Moscow on 19 April 2021, at the age of 97, amid the COVID-19 pandemic in Russia.
