= Boris Shilkov =

Soviet speed skater

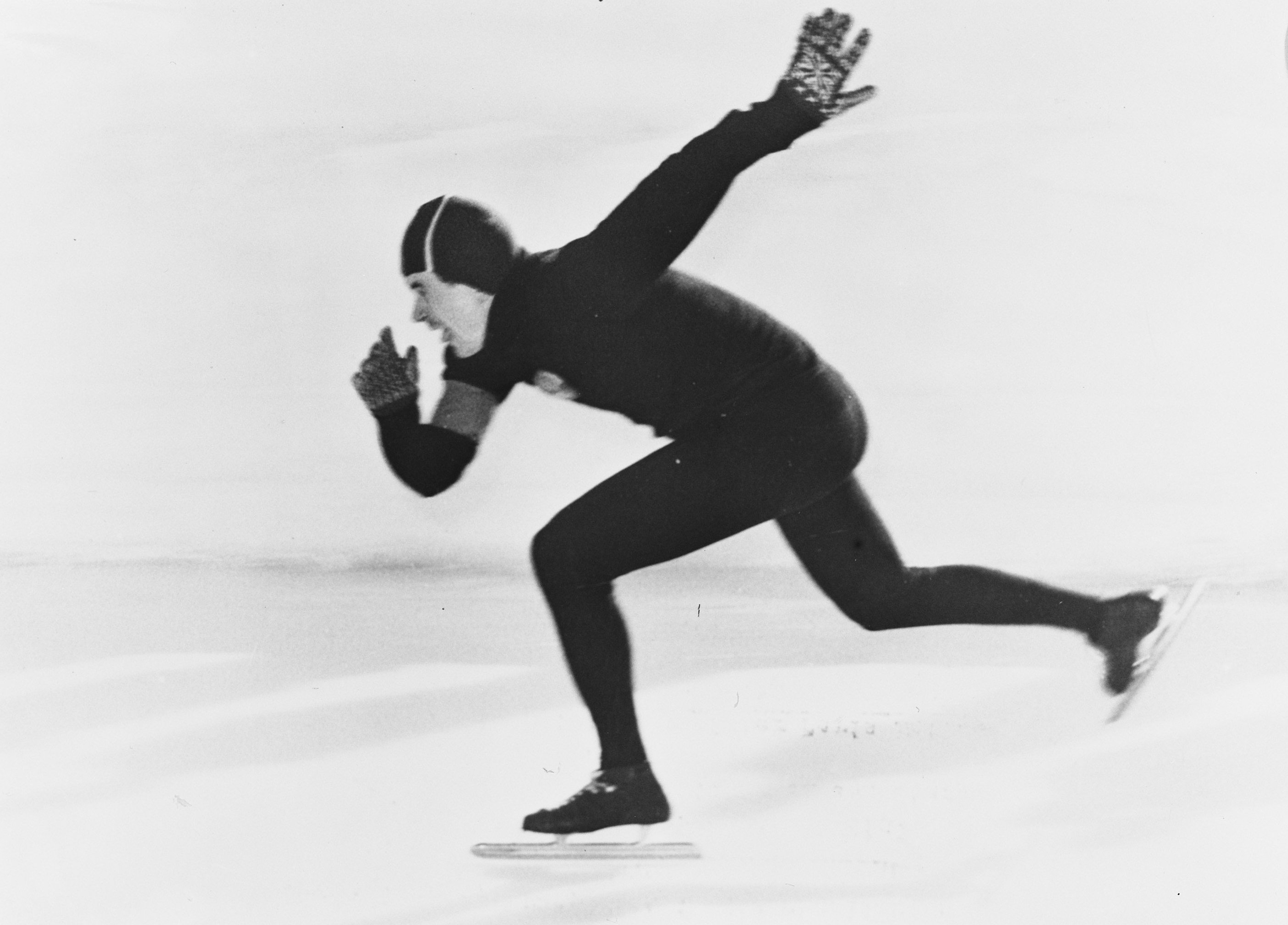
- Shilkov in 1954

Personal information
- Full name: Boris Arsenyevich Shilkov
- Born: 28 June 1927 Arkhangelsk, Russian SFSR, Soviet Union
- Died: 29 June 2015 (aged 88)

Sport
- Sport: Speed skating
- Club: Avangard Leningrad

Achievements and titles
- Personal best(s): 500 m: 41.9 (1960); 1500 m: 2:10.4 (1955); 3000 m: 4:55.7 (1960); 5000 m: 7:45.6 (1955); 10 000 m: 16:50.2 (1955)
Medal record
Representing Soviet Union
Olympic Games
| Gold medal – first place | 1956 Cortina d'Ampezzo | 5000 m |

Boris Arsenyevich Shilkov (Russian: Борис Арсеньевич Шилков; 28 June 1927 – 29 June 2015) was a speed skater.

== Skating career ==
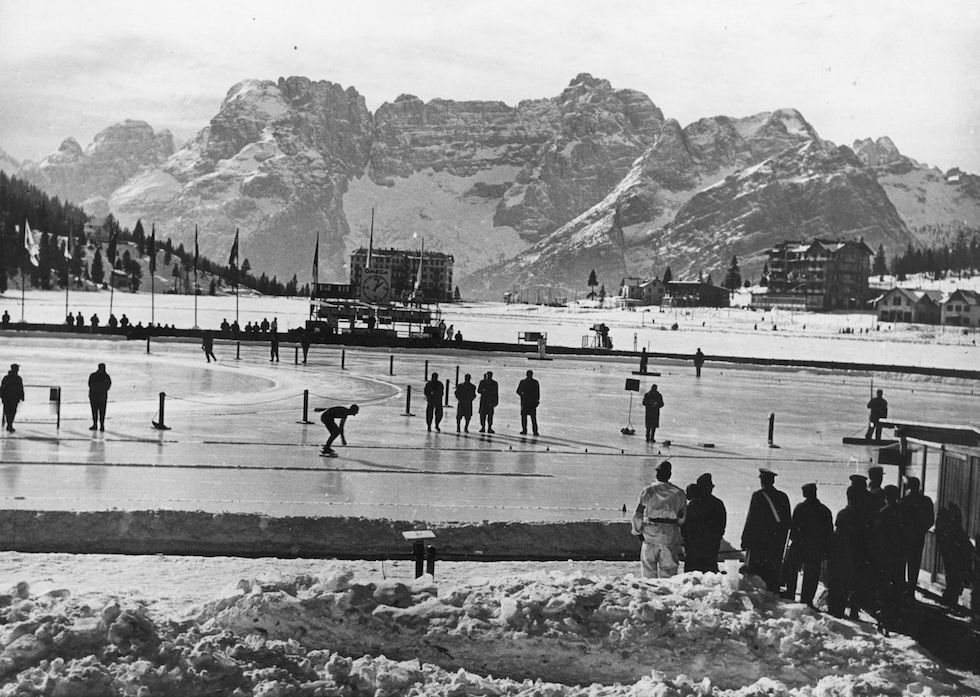
Shilkov passes the finishing line to win the 5,000 metre speed skating event at the 1956 Winter Olympics

Competing for the Soviet Union, Shilkov lived in Leningrad (now Saint Petersburg), where he worked as an engineer. He became Soviet Allround Champion in 1953 and made his international debut three weeks later at the World Allround Championships, where he won silver behind teammate and rival Oleg Goncharenko after having just recovered from an illness. The following year (1954) he became Soviet Allround Champion again (with Goncharenko, again, winning silver), European Allround Champion (with Goncharenko finishing 4th), and World Allround Champion (with Goncharenko taking the silver – a reversal of the roles of the year before).

In an international meet at Medeo, on 9 January 1955, Dmitry Sakunenko became the first person to skate the 5000 m below eight minutes, with 7:54.9. In a later pair Shilkov then improved this world record to 7:45.6. The following year, at the 1956 Winter Olympics in Cortina d'Ampezzo, he became Olympic Champion on the 5000 m, finishing only three seconds above his own world record.

Despite his 5000 m results, Shilkov had trouble with the 10000 m. This is illustrated by his performances at the World Allround Championships of 1953 (where he won silver), 1955 (where he won bronze), and 1957 (where he won silver): At each of these three World Championships he was in the lead after three distances, but lost too much on the final distance – the 10000 m – to win the title. His bronze medal at the World Championships of 1955 was 0.026 points behind the silver medallist (his eternal rival, Goncharenko) – a mere 0.52 seconds of difference on the 10000 m.

== Medals ==
An overview of medals won by Shilkov at major championships, listing the years in which he won each:

| Championships | Gold medal | Silver medal | Bronze medal |
|---|---|---|---|
| Winter Olympics | 1956 (5,000 m) | | |
| World Allround | 1954 | 1953; 1957 | 1955 |
| European Allround | 1954 | | |
| Soviet Allround | 1953; 1954; 1955 | | |

== Records ==
=== World record ===
Over the course of his career, Shilkov skated one world record:

| Discipline | Time | Date | Location |
|---|---|---|---|
| 5000 m | 7.45,6 | 9 January 1955 | (Soviet Union) Medeo |

Source: SpeedSkatingStats.com

=== Personal records ===
To put these personal records in perspective, the last column (WR) lists the official world records on the dates that Shilkov skated his personal records.

| Distance | Time | Date | Location | WR |
|---|---|---|---|---|
| 500 m | 41.9 | 30 January 1960 | Medeo | 40.2 |
| 1,500 m | 2:10.4 | 20 January 1955 | Medeo | 2:09.8 |
| 3,000 m | 4:55.7 | 26 December 1960 | Kirov | 4:40.2 |
| 5,000 m | 7:45.6 | 9 January 1955 | Medeo | 8:03.7 |
| 10,000 m | 16:50.2 | 20 January 1955 | Medeo | 16:32.6 |

Shilkov was number one on the Adelskalender – the all-time allround speed skating ranking – for a total of 1,518 days, divided over three periods between 1955 and 1960. He has an Adelskalender score of 182.436 points.

== Coaching career ==
After retiring from competitions Shilkov worked as a skating coach and functionary until 1989. He started at Trud Leningrad in 1959–62, then in 1962–64 and 1966–68 headed the national team, and spent his later years with Dynamo Leningrad. His pupils included Ants Antson, Igor Ostashov, Stanislav Selyanin and Vladimir Sveshnikov. Shilkov was awarded the Order of the Red Banner of Labour in 1957.
