= Oleg Goncharenko =

Soviet Speed skater

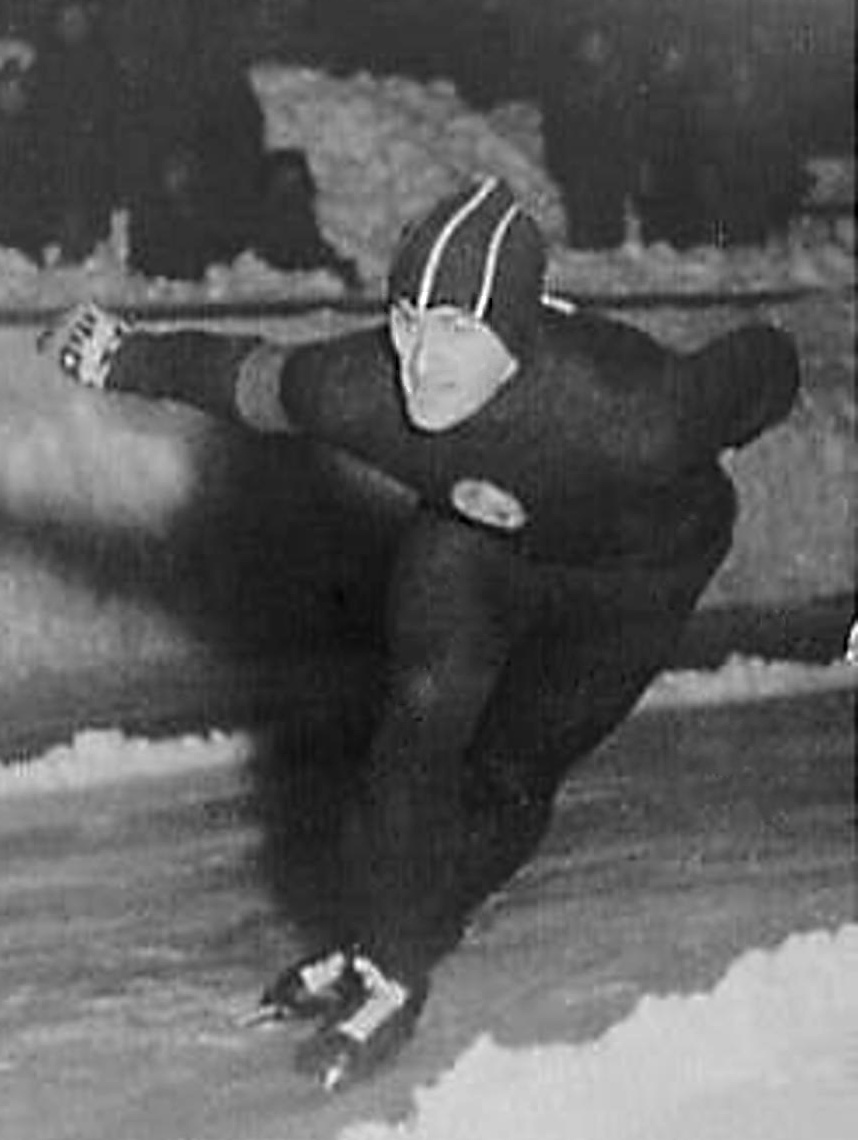

Personal information
- Nationality: Ukrainian
- Born: Oleg Georgievich Goncharenko; August 18, 1931 Kharkiv, Ukrainian SSR, Soviet Union
- Died: December 16, 1986 (aged 55) Moscow, Russian SFSR, Soviet Union

Sport
- Country: Soviet Union
- Sport: Speed skating

Achievements and titles
- Personal best(s): 500 m: 42.2 (1960); 1500 m: 2:11.6 (1960); 5000 m: 7:57.6 (1956); 10 000 m: 16:36.4 (1956)
Medal record
Representing Soviet Union
Men's speed skating
Bronze medal – third place	1956 Cortina d'Ampezzo	5,000 m
Bronze medal – third place	1956 Cortina d'Ampezzo	10,000 m

Oleg Georgievich Goncharenko (Russian: Олег Георгиевич Гончаренко, Ukrainian: Олег Георгійович Гончаренко) (18 August 1931 – 16 December 1986), Distinguished Master of Sports of the USSR, was the first male Soviet speed skater to become World Allround Champion.

Born in Kharkiv, Ukraine, Oleg Goncharenko made his international debut in 1953 and promptly became World Allround Champion. He would win two more World Allround Championships after that, as well as two European Allround Championships. In 1958, he won the "triple", becoming World, European, and Soviet Allround Champion. At the 1956 Winter Olympics of Cortina d'Ampezzo, Goncharenko won bronze on the 5,000 m and on the 10,000 m. He also participated in the 5,000 m at the 1960 Winter Olympics of Squaw Valley, but finished only sixth.

Both at home and abroad, Goncharenko was unusually popular for many years, even long after he had retired from speed skating. After winning his first World Championship in 1953 in Helsinki, he received dozens of telegrams in his hotel room there from all over the Soviet Union and from abroad. One of those telegrams he kept until the end of his life because it was particularly dear to him. It was a short message from the legendary Norwegian speed skater Oscar Mathisen, reading "Congratulations. Oscar Mathisen." – written just one year before Mathisen's death. Goncharenko's achievements also prompted two cities, Denver and Oslo, to name him an honorary citizen. He also was awarded the Order of Lenin.

Goncharenko retired from speed skating in 1962. He died in 1986, at the age of 55, after an illness.

== Medals ==
An overview of medals won by Goncharenko at important championships he participated in, listing the years in which he won each:

Championships	Gold medal	Silver medal	Bronze medal
Winter Olympics	–	–	1956 (5,000 m); 1956 (10,000 m)
World Allround	1953; 1956; 1958	1954; 1955	–
European Allround	1957; 1958	1955	–
Soviet Allround	1956; 1958	1953; 1954; 1957; 1960	–

== Personal records ==
To put these personal records in perspective, the WR column lists the official world records on the dates that Goncharenko skated his personal records.

Event	Result	Date	Venue	WR
500 m	42.2	4 January 1960	Medeo	40.2
1,500 m	2:11.6	28 February 1960	Squaw Valley	2:06.3
5,000 m	7:57.5	29 January 1956	Misurina	7:45.6
10,000 m	16:36.4	21 January 1956	Davos	16:32.6

Goncharenko has an Adelskalender score of 183.636 points. His highest ranking on the Adelskalender was a third place.
