= Alexei Guryshev =

Russian ice hockey player (1925–1983)

- Born: 14 March 1925 Moscow, Russian SFSR, Soviet Union
- Died: 16 December 1983 (aged 58) Moscow, Russian SFSR, Soviet Union
- Height: 6 ft 0 in (183 cm)
- Weight: 180 lb (82 kg; 12 st 12 lb)
- Position: Centre
- Shot: Left
- Played for: Krylya Sovetov Moscow
- National team: Soviet Union
- Playing career: 1947–1961
Medal record
Men's Ice hockey
Representing Soviet Union
Gold medal – first place	1956 Cortina d'Ampezzo	Ice hockey

Alexei Mikhailovich Guryshev (Russian: Алексей Михайлович Гурышев; 14 March 1925 – 16 December 1983) was a Russian ice hockey center. A four-time Soviet all-star, he was the top goal scorer in the Soviet Union five times: 1949, 1953, 1955, 1957, and 1958. He scored a total of 379 goals in 300 league games, making him the third highest goal scorer in league history.

Guryshev played on the national team between 1954 and 1959, scoring 71 goals in 92 games. He helped lead the Soviets to the gold medal at both the 1954 IIHF World Championships and the 1956 Winter Olympics. He was awarded the Order of the Badge of Honor (1957).

After his playing career, he became an international referee.
