= Amur Khabarovsk =

Ice hockey team based in Khabarovsk, Russia

- City: Khabarovsk, Russia
- League: KHL
- Conference: Eastern
- Division: Chernyshev
- Founded: 1966
- Home arena: Platinum Arena (capacity: 7,100)
- Colours
- Owner: Sukhoi
- General manager: Oleg Filimonov
- Head coach: Alexander Andriyevsky
- Captain: Vyacheslav Voynov
- Affiliates: Sokol Krasnoyarsk (VHL); Amurskie Tigry (MHL)
- Website: hcamur.ru

Hockey Club Amur (Russian: Хоккейный клуб Амур), commonly referred to as Amur , is a professional ice hockey club based in Khabarovsk, Russia. It is a member of the Chernyshev Division in the Kontinental Hockey League (KHL). Located in the Russian Far East, the team takes its name from the Amur River, and plays its home games at the Platinum Arena.

== History ==
Amur Khabarovsk was founded in 1966 as SKA Khabarovsk; it only adopted its current name in 1996, a name that comes from the nearby river Amur. By its location in the Russian Far East, the team is pretty isolated from every other team in the KHL, The nearest KHL team is Admiral Vladivostok.

For a long time a lower division dweller, Khabarovsk won the championship of the Soviet League Division 3 in 1989, earning promotion to the upper level. The team played regular season games known as the "Red Army" against West Coast Hockey League teams for the 1995–96 and 1996–97 seasons.

In 1996, Khabarovsk promoted to the Russian Superleague. A relegation to the Vysshaya Liga occurred in 2004 when the mining company that funds the club had financial difficulties. The Tigers could promote back to the top level in 2006. That same financial crisis forced the team's reserve squad, Golden Amur, to withdraw from the Asia League where it played for the 2004-05 season. The team could finish the season and take part in the playoffs, however; they finished third in regular season standings and failed to reach the playoffs finals.

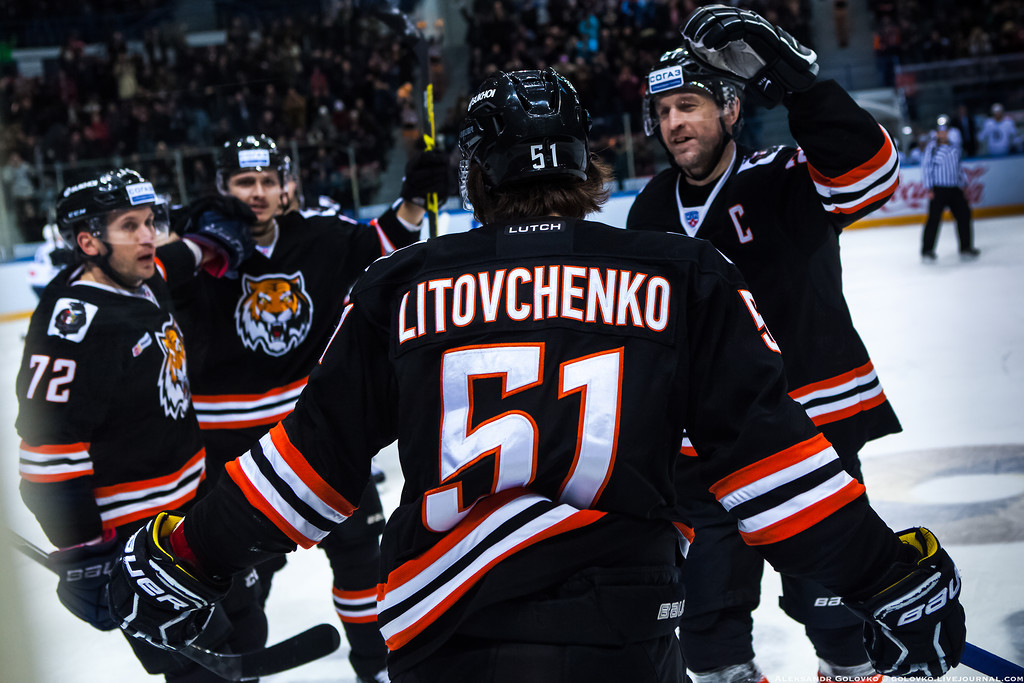
HC Amur players in 2015–16 season.

In 2008, Khabarovsk was one of the 24 founding members of the Kontinental Hockey League. The team played the league's inaugural game on September 2 against Dinamo Riga at home in front of a sell-out crowd of 7,100 people. They lost, 4-2 to the Latvian team. Riga and the Tigers were playing back-to-back games in Khabarovsk, however, and on the second match, Amur won 7-6 in a tied game that went to shootouts. But the 2008-09 didn't prove to be very successful for the Tigers. The team was plagued with injuries - in October only, 11 players were side-lined, including imports Kyle Wanvig and Bryce Lampman. The Tigers needed to strengthen their squad, and therefore offered a contract to Carolina Hurricanes's Matt Murley, which resulted in a controversy sometimes compared to Alexander Radulov's, even though there are many differences. Murley's signing didn't prove beneficial for Amur though, as he only contributed 8 points to a fairly impotent offence that scored only 111 goals. Veterans Oleg Belkin and Peter Nylander were Amur's top goal scorers with 11 goals each; Belkin was top scorer with a meager 24 points in 50 games. Amur's defence was better, with regular defencemen Vasily Turkovsky and Viktor Kostyuchenok even managing to finish the season with a +3 and +2 record, respectively. But overall, the season was disappointing for the Tigers, with a 20th place, 15 wins and 60 points.

Things barely improved in 2009-10. Amur finished 21st, out of playoffs again, this time again with 60 points and only 12 wins in regular time (plus three in overtime and six in the shootouts). Former Montreal Canadiens' and Columbus Blue Jackets' David Ling did the best in offense with 32 points, while Alexei Kopeikin and Ruslan Khasanshin were the best goal scorers with respectively 16 and 14 goals. All in all, it is only 129 goals that the team scored, 18 better than the previous season, but still fourth worst in the league. Oleg Belkin had to miss the whole season, while Peter Nylander left the team after ten game to go back in Sweden, joining Timrå IK of the Elitserien. The defence was not as solid as the previous season, with Turkovsky retired and Kostyuchenok traded to HC Spartak Moscow after 14 games. The result was 187 goals against, 29 more than the previous season. Former NHL veteran and Stanley Cup winner Nolan Pratt ended up being the fourth defenceman on the team in icetime and finished the season with 11 points and a -14 +/- rating.

== Season-by-season KHL record ==
Note: GP = Games played, W = Wins, L = Losses, T = Ties, OTL = Overtime/shootout losses, Pts = Points, GF = Goals for, GA = Goals against

Season	GP	W	OTW	SOW	SOL	OTL	L	Pts	GF	GA	Finish	Top scorer	Playoffs
2008–09	56	15	2	2	6	1	30	60	111	158	6th, Kharlamov Div.	Oleg Belkin (25 points: 11 G, 14 A; 50 GP)	Did not qualify
2009–10	56	12	3	6	4	2	29	60	129	187	10th, East	David Ling (32 points: 8 G, 24 A; 46 GP)	Did not qualify
2010–11	54	13	1	1	3	4	32	50	112	173	11th, East	Radik Zakiev (25 points: 12 G, 13 A; 54 GP)	Did not qualify
2011–12	54	23	1	4	3	2	21	84	166	139	7th, East	Jakub Petružálek (50 points: 22 G, 28 A; 54 GP)	Lost in Conference Quarterfinals, 0-4 (Avangard Omsk)
2012–13	52	11	1	4	1	0	35	44	115	167	13th, East	Jakub Petružálek (33 points: 15 G, 18 A; 41 GP)	Did not qualify
2013–14	54	8	1	4	10	1	30	45	106	182	14th, East	Alexander Yunkov (29 points: 18 G, 11 A; 50 GP)	Did not qualify
2014–15	60	11	0	3	4	2	40	45	117	207	14th, East	Dmitri Tarasov (36 points: 13 G, 23 A; 59 GP)	Did not qualify
2015–16	60	17	3	3	6	0	31	69	112	143	12th, East	Vladislav Ushenin (25 points: 14 G, 11 A; 57 GP)	Did not qualify
2016–17	60	20	1	4	4	2	29	76	110	130	12th, East	Tomáš Zohorna (34 points: 13 G, 21 A; 59 GP)	Did not qualify
2017–18	56	21	5	3	3	6	18	88	132	141	8th, East	Alexei Byvaltsev (43 points: 19 G, 24 A; 56 GP)	Lost in Conference Quarterfinals, 1-4 (Ak Bars Kazan)
2018–19	62	17	2	1	5	4	33	49	126	175	13th, East	Tomáš Zohorna (29 points: 14 G, 15 A; 62 GP)	Did not qualify
2019–20	62	20	1	5	6	4	26	62	132	145	9th, East	Vladislav Ushenin (34 points: 16 G, 18 A; 62 GP)	Did not qualify
2020–21	60	17	6	1	5	2	29	55	146	171	10th, East	Vladimir Butuzov (31 points: 15 G, 16 A; 60 GP)	Did not qualify
2021–22	50	12	3	4	4	4	23	46	97	125	10th, East	Alexander Gorshkov (25 points: 12 G, 13 A; 47 GP)	Did not qualify
2022–23	68	21	4	5	4	5	29	69	141	168	10th, East	Ivan Nikolishin (42 points: 17 G, 25 A; 67 GP)	Did not qualify
2023–24	68	23	3	3	7	6	26	71	159	178	8th, East	Yegor Korshkov (44 points: 15 G, 29 A; 67 GP)	Lost in Last 16, 2-4 (Metallurg Magnitogorsk)
2024–25	68	11	3	4	2	6	42	44	150	235	11th, East	Alex Galchenyuk (38 points: 20 G, 18 A; 59 GP)	Did not qualify
2025–26	68	22	2	2	4	4	34	60	157	192	9th, East	Yaroslav Likhachyov (39 points: 22 G, 17 A; 59 GP)	Did not qualify

== Players ==
=== Current roster ===
Updated 28 September 2026.

No.	Nat	Player	Pos	S/G	Age	Acquired	Birthplace
11	(Russia)	Vitalii Abramov (A)	RW	L	28	2026	Chelyabinsk, Russia
19	(Russia)	Raul Akmaldinov	D	R	24	2025	Ust-Kamenogorsk, Kazakhstan
25	(Russia)	Boris Borin	C	L	18	2026	Moscow, Russia
82	(Russia)	Ivan Chekhovich	LW	L	27	2025	Yekaterinburg, Russia
18	(Russia)	Alexander Dergachyov (A)	C	L	30	2026	Langepas, Russia
83	(Russia)	Maxim Dorozhko	G	L	28	2025	Podolsk, Russia
2	(Russia)	Yaroslav Dyominsky	D	L	17	2026	Khabarovsk, Russia
12	(Russia)	Alexander Filatyev	C	L	22	2025	Komsomolsk-na-Amure, Russia
3	(Russia)	Danila Galenyuk	D	L	26	2026	Tyumen, Russia
4	(Russia)	Fyodor Khrapov	C	L	21	2026	Moscow, Russia
16	(Russia)	Ivan Klimovich	C	L	23	2026	Novosibirsk, Russia
60	(Russia)	Viktor Kobozev	G	L	22	2024	Moscow, Russia
8	(Russia)	Dmitri Kostenko	D	R	24	2026	Togliatti, Russia
88	(Russia)	Maxim Krovyakov	C	R	24	2026	Solnechnogorsk, Russia
78	(Russia)	Alexei Kruchinin	C	R	35	2026	Kostomuksha, Russian SFSR
56	(Russia)	Grigori Kuzmin	LW	R	23	2026	Yaroslavl, Russia
90	(Russia)	Oleg Li (A)	RW	L	35	2024	Volgograd, Russian SFSR
10	(Russia)	Yaroslav Likhachyov	LW	R	25	2025	Yaroslavl, Russia
34	(Russia)	Konstantin Lukin	RW	L	25	2026	Chelyabinsk, Russia
23	(Russia)	Vasili Machulin	D	L	24	2026	Moscow, Russia
98	(Russia)	Kirill Petkov	LW	L	28	2025	Gomel, Belarus
13	(Russia)	Kirill Pilipenko	RW	L	30	2026	Yekaterinburg, Russia
17	(Russia)	Yegor Rykov	D	L	29	2025	Vidnoye, Russia
77	(Russia)	Artyom Shvaryov	F	L	25	2025	Chelyabinsk, Russia
24	(Russia)	Alexey Solovyev	D	L	32	2025	Moscow, Russia
1	(Russia)	Alexander Trushkov	G	L	30	2026	Moscow, Russia
21	(Russia)	Kirill Urakov	C	L	28	2025	Izhevsk, Russia
93	(Russia)	Alexei Vasilevsky (A)	D	R	33	2026	Ufa, Russia
57	(Russia)	Yegor Voronkov	D	L	29	2025	Podolsk, Russia
26	(Russia)	Vyacheslav Voynov (C)	D	R	36	2026	Chelyabinsk, Russian SFSR
50	(Russia)	Danil Yurtaikin	RW	R	29	2026	Belovo, Russia

== Franchise records and leaders ==
=== Scoring leaders ===
These are the top-ten point-scorers in franchise history in the KHL. Note: Pos = Position; GP = Games played; G = Goals; A = Assists; Pts = Points; P/G = Points per game; bold = current Amur player

Player	GP	G	A	Pts	PIM	+/-	PPG	SHG	GWG
(Czech Republic) Tomas Zohorna	313	64	100	164	246	-10	13	2	11
(Russia) Vladislav Ushenin	308	69	64	133	112	-11	20	0	13
(Russia) Vyacheslav Ushenin	306	38	91	129	198	-19	9	0	6
(Russia) Alexander Gorshkov	255	52	60	112	73	-18	16	0	8
(Russia) **Oleg Li**	259	45	66	111	92	-8	5	4	5
(Russia) Dmitri Tarasov	249	47	63	110	140	-45	10	0	4
(Czech Republic) Jakub Petruzalek	133	50	54	104	60	-2	18	4	11
(Russia) Alexei Kopeikin	183	32	50	82	68	-43	13	1	4
(Russia) Dmitri Lugin	232	35	46	81	81	-48	8	0	3
(Czech Republic) Michal Jordán	261	24	57	81	74	10	7	2	5

== Team awards and honors ==
=== Winners ===
(gold) Motor Cup (České Budějovice) (1): 2019

=== Runners-up ===
(silver) KHL Cup of Hope (1): 2013
