= List of European ice hockey arenas =

The following is a list of European ice hockey arenas by capacity. Only those arenas that can accommodate at least 10,000 seating capacity for hockey games and have a stationary ice rink. Outdoor stadiums that have hosted occasional hockey games are not included. Note that some arenas in Russia or Kazakhstan which are located in Asia are also included.

== European ice hockey arenas by capacity ==
Rank	Arena	Ice hockey capacity only	Opened (* last renovation)	City	Country	Home team(s) (league, dates)	Image
1	SKA Arena	21,520	2023	Saint Petersburg	Russia	SKA (2024–04/2025, 09/2026-present); Shanghai Dragons (China) (2025-present)	
2	MVM Dome	19,182	2021	Budapest	Hungary	Hungary men's national ice hockey team (2021–present)	
3	Lanxess Arena	18,500	1998	Cologne	Germany	Kölner Haie (1998–present)	
4	O2 Arena	17,383	2004	Prague	Czech Republic	HC Sparta (2015–present)	
5	PostFinance-Arena	17,031	2009*	Bern	Switzerland	SC Bern (1967–present)	
6	Arena Zagreb	15,200	2008	Zagreb	Croatia	Medveščak (2011–2013) Croatia men's national ice hockey team (2008–present)	
7	Minsk-Arena	15,086	2009	Minsk	Belarus	HC Dinamo Minsk (2010–present)	
8	Tauron Arena Kraków	15,030	2014	Kraków	Poland	Comarch Cracovia (2016)	
9	ISS Dome	14,282	2006	Düsseldorf	Germany	Düsseldorfer EG (2006–present)	
10	Uber Arena	14,200	2008	Berlin	Germany	Eisbären Berlin (2008–present)	
11	Accor Arena	13,877	2015*	Paris	France	(Coupe de France, ?–present)	
12	Avicii Arena	13,850	1989	Stockholm	Sweden	Djurgårdens IF (1989–present); Tre Kronor (1989–present)	
13	Žalgiris Arena	13,742	2011	Kaunas	Lithuania	Lithuania men's national ice hockey team (2011–present)	
14	SAP Arena	13,600	2005	Mannheim	Germany	Adler Mannheim (2005–present)	
15	Nokia Arena	13,455	2021	Tampere	Finland	Ilves (2021–present) Tappara (2021–present)	
16	Veikkaus Arena	13,349	1997	Helsinki	Finland	Jokerit (1997–2022, 2025–present)	
17	Barclays Arena	12,947	2002	Hamburg	Germany	Hamburg Freezers (2002–2016)	
18	Malmö Arena	12,600	2009	Malmö	Sweden	Malmö Redhawks (2008–present)	
19	UMMC Arena	12,588	2025	Ekaterinburg	Russia	HC Avtomobilist (2025–present)	
20	Almaty Arena	12,500	2016	Almaty	Kazakhstan	HC Almaty (2016–present)	
21	Royal Arena	12,500	2017	Copenhagen	Denmark	Denmark men's national ice hockey team (2017–present)	
22	Ice Palace	12,452	2000	Saint Petersburg	Russia	SKA (2000–2025) SKA-VMF (2024–present)	
23	Megasport	12,396	2006	Moscow	Russia	HC Spartak Moscow (2021–present)	
24	Volga Arena	12,350	2026	Nizhny Novgorod	Russia	HC Torpedo (2026–present)	
25	Inalpi Arena	12,350	2005	Turin	Italy		
26	Scandinavium	12,044	2006*	Gothenburg	Sweden	Frölunda HC (1971–present)	
27	Bolshoy Ice Dome	12,035	2013	Sochi	Russia	HC Sochi (2014–present)	
28	G-Drive Arena	12,011	2022	Omsk	Russia	HC Avangard (2022–present)	
29	Iceberg Skating Palace	12,000	2012	Sochi	Russia		
30	CSKA Arena	11,880	2015	Moscow	Russia	HC CSKA Moscow (2018–present)	
31	Milano Santa Giulia Ice Hockey Arena	11,800	2026	Milan	Italy	Hockey Club Milano Bears (2026)	
32	Sibir Arena	11,650	2023	Novosibirsk	Russia	HC Sibir (2023–present)	
33	Barys Arena	11,626	2015	Astana	Kazakhstan	Barys (2015–present)	
34	Swiss Life Arena	11,157	2022	Zürich	Switzerland	ZSC Lions (2022–present)	
35	Jyske Bank Boxen	11,000	2010	Herning	Denmark	Denmark men's national ice hockey team (2010–present)	
36	Odyssey Arena	10,800	2015*	Belfast	United Kingdom	Belfast Giants (?–present)	
37	SAP Garden	10,796	2024	Munich	Germany	Red Bull (2024–present)	
38	VTB Arena	10,523	2019*	Moscow	Russia	HC Dynamo Moscow (2019–present)	
39	Gatorade Center	10,500	2018*	Turku	Finland	HC TPS (1989-present)	
40	Xiaomi Arena	10,266	2008	Riga	Latvia	HC Dynamo Riga (2008–2023)	
41	Enteria arena	10,194	2007*	Pardubice	Czech Republic	HC Dynamo Pardubice (1960–present)	
42	Ondrej Nepela Arena	10,055	2011*	Bratislava	Slovakia	HC Slovan (1940–present)	
43	Ostravar Aréna	10,004	2009*	Ostrava	Czech Republic	HC Vítkovice Steel (1986–present)	

== See also ==
- List of indoor arenas in Europe
- List of ice hockey arenas by capacity
- Lists of stadiums
- List of NHL arenas
- List of KHL arenas
- List of indoor arenas in Switzerland
- List of VHL arenas
