= Ice Palace (Saint Petersburg) =

Multi-purpose arena in Saint Petersburg, Russia

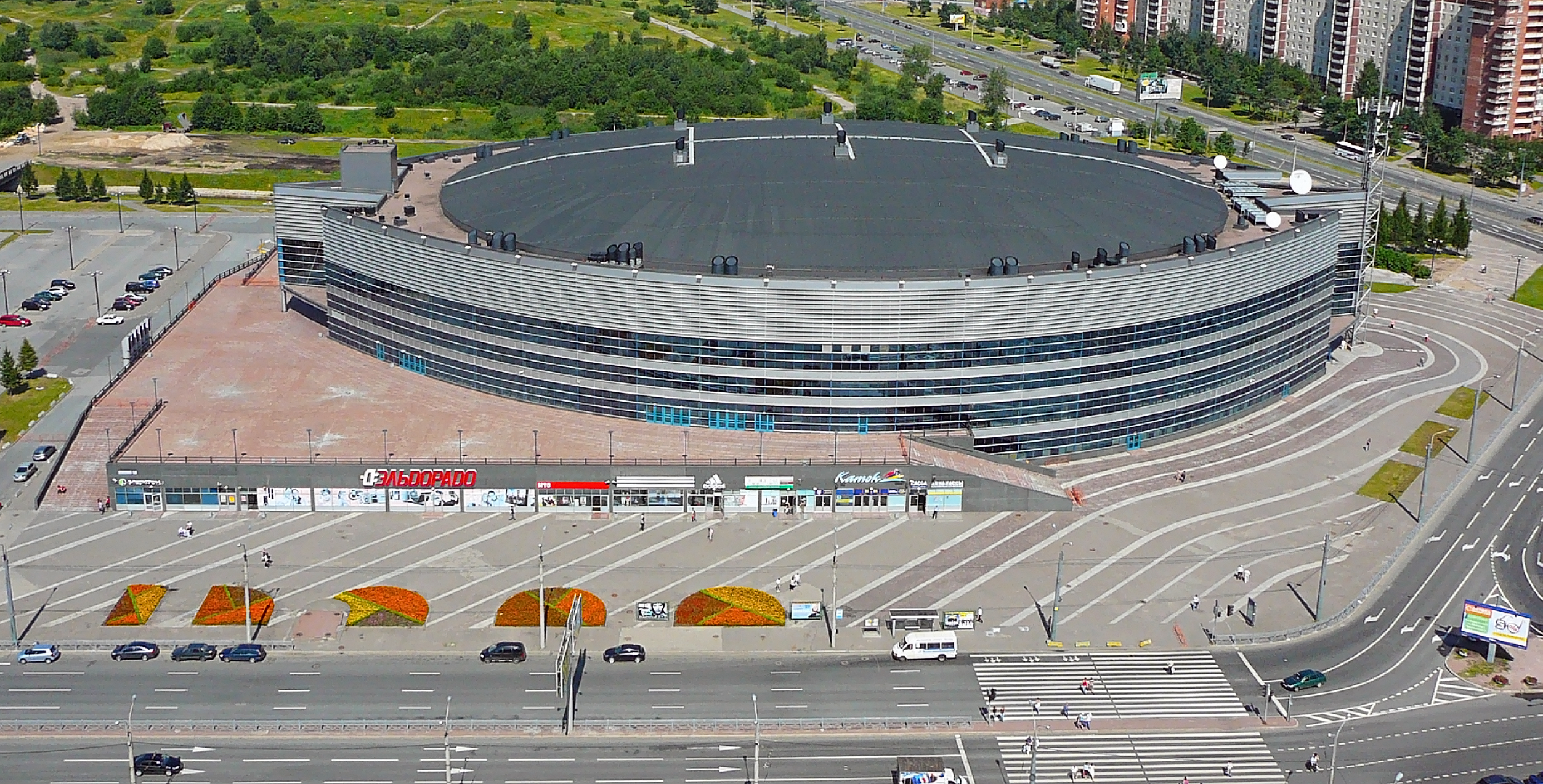
- Interactive map of Ice Palace
- Location: Saint Petersburg, Russia
- Coordinates: 59.921667°N 30.466389°E
- Capacity: 12,300
- Field size: 60×26 m

Construction
- Groundbreaking: 1998
- Built: 2000
- Opened: April 2000
- Cost: $60 Million USD
- Project managers: Lenniiproekt, Skanska

Tenant
- SKA Saint Petersburg (KHL) (2005–2024, 2025–present)

The Ice Palace (Russian: Ледовый Дворец, Ledovy Dvorets) is an arena in Saint Petersburg, Russia. It was built for the 2000 IIHF World Championship and opened in 2000. It holds 12,300 people.

The Ice Palace is primarily used for ice hockey and was the home arena for SKA Saint Petersburg from 2005 until 2024, when the team moved into the new SKA Arena, the largest hockey arena in the world. It hosted the IIHF European Champions Cup in 2005, 2006, 2007 and 2008. It is also used for concerts, exhibitions and as a skating rink. After only one season in the SKA Arena, SKA Saint Petersburg temporarily returned to the Ice Palace.

== Events ==
Many popular musical acts have played the arena, including A-ha, Lana Del Rey, Christina Aguilera, Kylie Minogue, Roxette, Whitney Houston, Mariah Carey, Elton John, Eric Clapton, Sting, Cher, Iron Maiden, Fall Out Boy, Enrique Iglesias, Britney Spears, Jennifer Lopez, Pink, Sade, Björk, Billie Eilish, Robbie Williams, Lorde, Backstreet Boys, Sarah Brightman, NCT 127, Pet Shop Boys, Scorpions, Kiss, Whitesnake and Nickelback.

== See also ==
- List of indoor arenas in Russia
- List of European ice hockey arenas

Preceded by Yubileyny Sports Palace	Home of SKA Saint Petersburg; 2005–2024	Succeeded by SKA Arena
