= Dmitri Tarasov =

Dmitri Tarasov may refer to:

- Dmitri Tarasov (footballer) (born 1987), Russian footballer
- Dmitri Tarasov (ice hockey) (1979–2023), Russian ice hockey player
- Dmitri Tarasov (screenwriter), Soviet screenwriter of The Liberated Earth
