= Pavel Koledov =

Russian ice hockey player

- Born: September 20, 1994 (age 32) Novosibirsk, Russia
- Height: 6 ft 1 in (185 cm)
- Weight: 209 lb (95 kg; 14 st 13 lb)
- Position: Defence
- Shoots: Right
- KHL team Former teams: Shanghai Dragons; HC Sibir Novosibirsk; Lokomotiv Yaroslavl; HC Sochi; Salavat Yulaev Ufa; Avangard Omsk; Admiral Vladivostok; SKA St. Petersburg
- Playing career: 2012–present

Pavel Vyacheslavovich Koledov (Павел Вячеславович Коледов; born September 20, 1994) is a Russian professional ice hockey defenceman. He is currently playing with the Shanghai Dragons of the Kontinental Hockey League (KHL).

Koledov made his Kontinental Hockey League (KHL) debut playing with Lokomotiv Yaroslavl during the 2012–13 KHL season.

== Statistics ==
Koledov played 596 games in the KHL, scored 38 goals, made 86 assists, scored 199 penalty minutes, and scored "+46".

Koledov played 40 games in the VHL, scored 1 goal, made 3 assists, scored 12 penalty minutes, and scored "-3" utility score.

Koledov played 111 games in the MHL, scored 12 goals, made 26 assists, scored 138 penalty minutes, and scored "-1".
