= Kopeikin =

Kopeikin or Kopeykin (Russian: Копейкин) is a Russian masculine surname, its feminine counterpart is Kopeikina or Kopeykina. It may refer to

- Alexei Kopeikin (born 1983), Russian ice hockey forward
- Boris Kopeykin (born 1946), Russian football player
- Sergei Kopeikin (born 1956), American theoretical physicist

== Fictional characters ==
- Captain Kopeikin, vigilante from the story-inside-story in Dead Souls
