= 2026–27 KHL season =

- League: Kontinental Hockey League
- Sport: Ice hockey
- Games: 68
- Teams: 22
- TV partner(s): KHL TV, KHL Prime Match TV (Russia); Qazsport (Kazakhstan); Belarus 5 (Belarus); Kinopoisk (streaming partner); Regional broadcasters (local team games only) TNV Tatarstan (Ak Bars Kazan); BST (Salavat Yulaev Ufa); Channel 12 (Avangard Omsk); TV-IN (Metallurg Magnitogorsk); Channel 78 (SKA Saint-Petersburg); Pervy Yaroslavsky (Lokomotiv Yaroslavl); NN 24 (Torpedo Nizhny Novgorod); Guberniya (Amur Khabarovsk); OTV (Traktor Chelyabinsk); OTV Primorye (Admiral Vladivostok); OTS (Sibir Novosibirsk)

Regular season

Playoffs

KHL seasons
- ← 2025–26 2027–28 →

The 2026–27 KHL season is the 19th season of the Kontinental Hockey League. 22 teams will compete in 68 regular season games between 5 September 2026 and 20 March 2027.

== Season changes ==
The playoff seeding system has been changed. From the second round onwards, teams will be reseeded each round according to the overall standings.

For the first time since introduction, the league's salary cap has been raised by 50 million rubles, to 950 million rubles excluding certain bonuses. The salary floor has also been raised by 50 million rubles, to 525 million rubles.

Several rules were implemented to increase pace of play:

- Video reviews for penalties can now be evaluated for player simulation. The referees also gained the ability to initiate a video review for puck-over-glass delay of game penalties without a coach's challenge, and review goaltender interference if the play is already under review to determine if the puck has crossed the goal line.
- Hand passes that are both sent and received inside the team's half of the rink will no longer cause a stoppage of play.
- A player that lost his helmet will no longer be penalized if he picks it up, puts it on and continues play.
- A player using his hand to play the puck now must keep it open.

For the first time in league history, the Opening Cup will not be awarded, and multiple games will be played on opening day.

== Teams ==
The 22 teams are split into four divisions: the Bobrov Division and the Tarasov Division as part of the Western Conference, with the Kharlamov Division and the Chernyshev Division as part of the Eastern Conference.

Western Conference		Eastern Conference	
Bobrov Division	Tarasov Division	Kharlamov Division	Chernyshev Division
(Russia) Lada Togliatti	(Russia) CSKA Moscow	(Russia) Ak Bars Kazan	(Russia) Admiral Vladivostok
(Russia) SKA Saint Petersburg	(Belarus) Dinamo Minsk	(Russia) Avtomobilist Yekaterinburg	(Russia) Amur Khabarovsk
(Russia) HC Sochi	(Russia) Dynamo Moscow	(Russia) Metallurg Magnitogorsk	(Russia) Avangard Omsk
(Russia) Spartak Moscow	(Russia) Lokomotiv Yaroslavl	(Russia) Neftekhimik Nizhnekamsk	(Kazakhstan) Barys Astana
(Russia) Torpedo Nizhny Novgorod	(Russia) Severstal Cherepovets	(Russia) Traktor Chelyabinsk	(Russia) Salavat Yulaev Ufa
	(China) Shanghai Dragons (Note: The Shanghai Dragons will play their home games in SKA Arena, in St. Petersburg, Russia)		(Russia) Sibir Novosibirsk

== Standings ==
=== Western Conference ===
Pos	Team	Pld	W	OTW	OTL	L	GF	GA	GD	Pts	Qualification
1	Lokomotiv Yaroslavl	1	1	0	0	0	5	1	+4	2	Conference winner and Home advantage in Conference Quarterfinals of Gagarin Cup Playoffs
2	Torpedo Nizhny Novgorod	1	1	0	0	0	1	0	+1	2	Home advantage in Conference Quarterfinals of Gagarin Cup Playoffs
3	Shanghai Dragons	1	0	1	0	0	5	4	+1	2	Home advantage in Conference Quarterfinals of Gagarin Cup Playoffs
4	SKA Saint Petersburg	1	0	1	0	0	4	3	+1	2	Home advantage in Conference Quarterfinals of Gagarin Cup Playoffs
5	Lada Togliatti	1	0	0	1	0	3	4	−1	1	Advance to Gagarin Cup Playoffs
6	Dinamo Minsk	0	0	0	0	0	0	0	0	0	Advance to Gagarin Cup Playoffs
7	HC Sochi	0	0	0	0	0	0	0	0	0	Advance to Gagarin Cup Playoffs
8	CSKA Moscow	0	0	0	0	0	0	0	0	0	Advance to Gagarin Cup Playoffs
9	Severstal Cherepovets	1	0	0	0	1	2	3	−1	0	
10	Dynamo Moscow	1	0	0	0	1	1	2	−1	0	
11	Spartak Moscow	1	0	0	0	1	0	1	−1	0	

Source: KHL
Rules for classification: 1) points; 2) games won in regulation time; 3) games won in overtime; 4) games won in shootouts; 5) goal difference; 6) number of goals scored; 7) drawing of lots.

=== Eastern Conference ===
Pos	Team	Pld	W	OTW	OTL	L	GF	GA	GD	Pts	Qualification
1	Metallurg Magnitogorsk	1	1	0	0	0	4	2	+2	2	Conference winner and Home advantage in Conference Quarterfinals of Gagarin Cup Playoffs
2	Salavat Yulaev Ufa	1	1	0	0	0	3	2	+1	2	Home advantage in Conference Quarterfinals of Gagarin Cup Playoffs
3	Avtomobilist Yekaterinburg	1	1	0	0	0	2	1	+1	2	Home advantage in Conference Quarterfinals of Gagarin Cup Playoffs
4	Ak Bars Kazan	1	0	1	0	0	4	3	+1	2	Home advantage in Conference Quarterfinals of Gagarin Cup Playoffs
5	Neftekhimik Nizhnekamsk	1	0	0	1	0	4	5	−1	1	Advance to Gagarin Cup Playoffs
6	Sibir Novosibirsk	1	0	0	1	0	3	4	−1	1	Advance to Gagarin Cup Playoffs
7	Avangard Omsk	0	0	0	0	0	0	0	0	0	Advance to Gagarin Cup Playoffs
8	Admiral Vladivostok	0	0	0	0	0	0	0	0	0	Advance to Gagarin Cup Playoffs
9	Barys Astana	0	0	0	0	0	0	0	0	0	
10	Amur Khabarovsk	1	0	0	0	1	2	4	−2	0	
11	Traktor Chelyabinsk	1	0	0	0	1	1	5	−4	0	

Source: KHL
Rules for classification: 1) points; 2) games won in regulation time; 3) games won in overtime; 4) games won in shootouts; 5) goal difference; 6) number of goals

=== Continental Cup ===
Pos	Team	Pld	W	OTW	OTL	L	GF	GA	GD	Pts	Qualification
1	Lokomotiv Yaroslavl	1	1	0	0	0	5	1	+4	2	Continental Cup winner and first overall seed in Gagarin Cup Playoffs
2	Metallurg Magnitogorsk	1	1	0	0	0	4	2	+2	2	
3	Salavat Yulaev Ufa	1	1	0	0	0	3	2	+1	2	
4	Avtomobilist Yekaterinburg	1	1	0	0	0	2	1	+1	2	
5	Torpedo Nizhny Novgorod	1	1	0	0	0	1	0	+1	2	
6	Shanghai Dragons	1	0	1	0	0	5	4	+1	2	
7	SKA Saint Petersburg	1	0	1	0	0	4	3	+1	2	
8	Ak Bars Kazan	1	0	1	0	0	4	3	+1	2	
9	Neftekhimik Nizhnekamsk	1	0	0	1	0	4	5	−1	1	
10	Lada Togliatti	1	0	0	1	0	3	4	−1	1	
11	Sibir Novosibirsk	1	0	0	1	0	3	4	−1	1	
12	Avangard Omsk	0	0	0	0	0	0	0	0	0	
13	Admiral Vladivostok	0	0	0	0	0	0	0	0	0	
14	Barys Astana	0	0	0	0	0	0	0	0	0	
15	Dinamo Minsk	0	0	0	0	0	0	0	0	0	
16	HC Sochi	0	0	0	0	0	0	0	0	0	
17	CSKA Moscow	0	0	0	0	0	0	0	0	0	
18	Severstal Cherepovets	1	0	0	0	1	2	3	−1	0	
19	Dynamo Moscow	1	0	0	0	1	1	2	−1	0	
20	Spartak Moscow	1	0	0	0	1	0	1	−1	0	
21	Amur Khabarovsk	1	0	0	0	1	2	4	−2	0	
22	Traktor Chelyabinsk	1	0	0	0	1	1	5	−4	0	

Source: KHL
Rules for classification: 1) points; 2) games won in regulation time; 3) games won in overtime; 4) games won in shootouts; 5) goal difference; 6) number of goals scored; 7) drawing of lots.

== Gagarin Cup Playoffs ==
The Gagarin Cup playoffs will start on 23 March 2027. Game 7 of the Gagarin Cup Final, if necessary, will be played on 23 May 2027.

== All-Star Game ==
The 2027 KHL All-Star Game will be held at Minsk Arena on February 6-7, 2027.
