= Mitch Love =

Canadian ice hockey player and coach

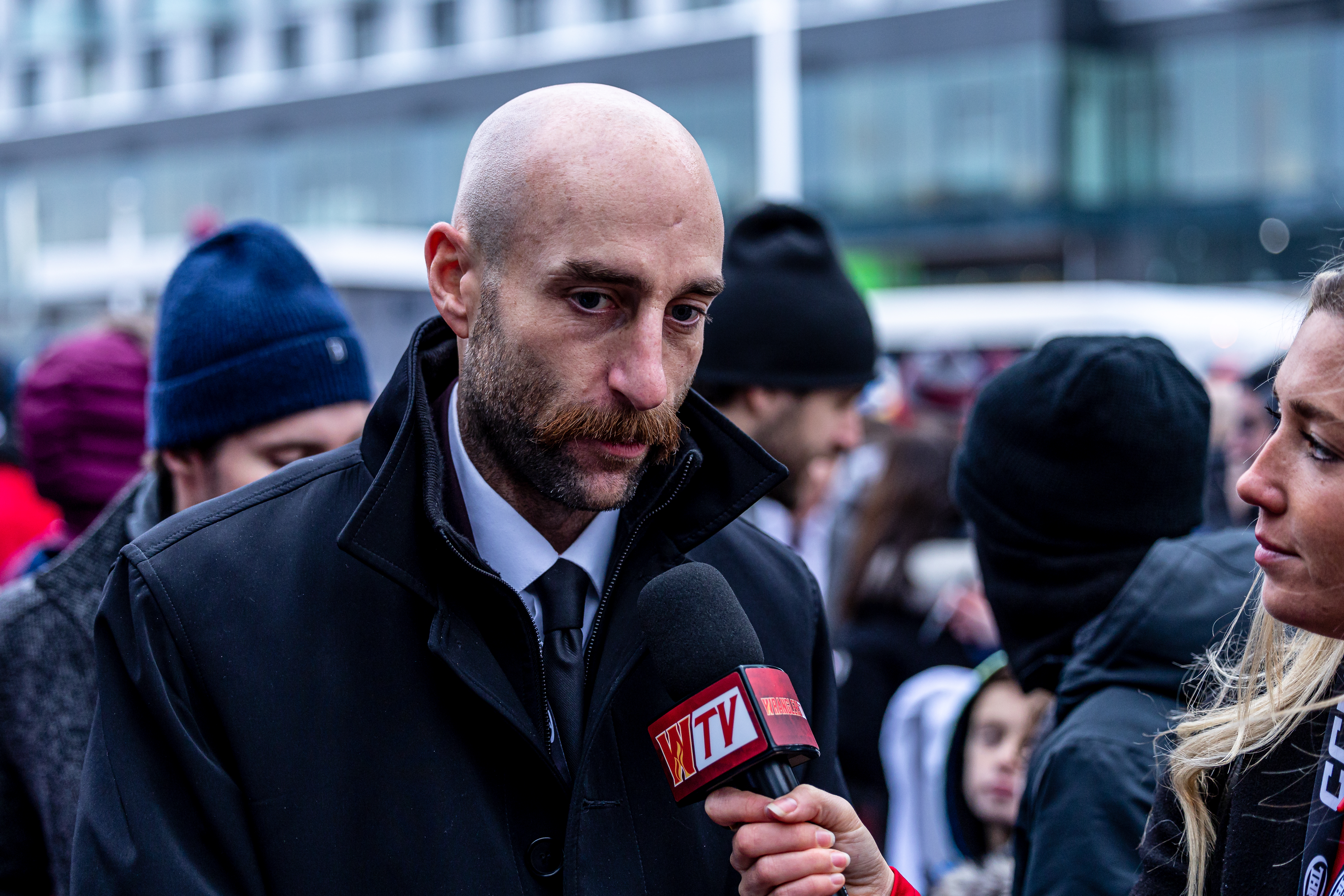
- Love in 2023
- Born: June 15, 1984 (age 42) Quesnel, British Columbia, Canada
- Height: 6 ft 0 in (183 cm)
- Weight: 175 lb (79 kg; 12 st 7 lb)
- Position: Defence/left wing
- Shot: Left
- Played for: Lowell Lock Monsters; Albany River Rats; Lake Erie Monsters; Houston Aeros; Peoria Rivermen
- Current KHL coach: Shanghai Dragons
- NHL draft: Undrafted
- Playing career: 2005–2011
- Coaching career: 2011–present

Mitchell Ryan Love (born June 15, 1984) is a Canadian professional ice hockey coach and former player who is the head coach for the Shanghai Dragons of the Kontinental Hockey League (KHL). He previously served as an assistant coach with the Washington Capitals of the National Hockey League (NHL).

As a player, Love played the role of both a pest and an enforcer, as well as being an experienced fighter. During his time on the ice, he averaged 3.4 penalty minutes a game over his entire career. Love ranks 31st in all-time penalty minutes among Western Hockey League (WHL) players with 901, and no player in the league since has surpassed his total.

In his major junior career, Love played for three different WHL teams across six seasons: the Moose Jaw Warriors, Swift Current Broncos, and the Everett Silvertips. Love played a very physical game, once leading the league with 327 penalty minutes and 40 fights during the 2002–03 WHL season, capturing a long-standing team record for single-season penalty minutes with the Broncos in the process. Love is regarded as one of the greatest Silvertips players of all time, and is the only person to have their jersey retired by the team.

Undrafted at the NHL level, Love nonetheless managed to spend several years as a professional hockey player. During his professional career, Love played for seven different teams over six seasons, primarily in the American Hockey League (AHL). He spent time under an NHL contract with the Colorado Avalanche, but never played in the NHL. A hard-hitting defenceman and later left winger, Love found a place in the league due to his physical play, including posting 34 fights during the 2008–09 AHL season, more than any other professional hockey player in the world that year.

== Early life ==
Love was born on June 15, 1984, in Quesnel, British Columbia, to parents Harley and Melanie Love. Love's younger sister Jill was also a hockey player, most notably playing for the University of Regina Cougars. His father Harley worked at a local sawmill, and was a goaltender, playing in the BCHL as well as professionally in Germany, eventually serving as a scout for the multiple WHL teams. Love's mother Melanie worked several jobs to support Mitch and Jill's hockey endeavours. Love grew up watching the Prince George Cougars, where he dreamed of eventually playing in the Western Hockey League (WHL).

== Playing career ==
=== Junior ===
==== 1999–2003: Early years ====
Moving away from home at 15 years old, Love played bantam, midget, and junior ice hockey for Notre Dame in Wilcox, Saskatchewan, a school noted for producing high quality athletes, as well as its scouting presence. Undrafted at the major junior level, Love was able to make the WHL's Moose Jaw Warriors for a pair of games in the 1999–00 season after attending their training camp. Love's play and maturation landed him a full-time role with the Warriors for the 2000–01 season. In October 2001 Love was traded to the Swift Current Broncos where he would bring an element of toughness to the team, fighting 18 times during the 2001–02 season. Love would go on to lead the league and capture a Broncos record during the 2002–03 season with 327 penalty minutes, including 40 fighting majors.

==== 2003–2005: Everett Silvertips ====
Prior to the 2003–04 season, Love was traded by the Broncos to the expansion franchise Everett Silvertips along with teammate Torrie Wheat for Matěj Trojovský and a 6th Round pick in the 2004 WHL Bantam Draft. Love was named an alternate captain for the Silvertips, and played on the first defensive pairing for most of the season as well as posting career highs in goals and assists. The Silvertips would go on to have one of the most successful inaugural seasons in hockey history, and Love's work aided the team during their deep playoff run, scoring a game-winning goal in the western conference final.

Prior to the 2004–05 season, Love was named captain of the Silvertips for his final season in the WHL, again having a career year in terms of points, despite playing significantly less than a full season. On November 6, 2004, Love would have the best game of his WHL career in terms of points, with one goal and four assists in a 5–2 win against the Saskatoon Blades. His high-scoring performance was followed up with what Love himself would describe as his "worst game of the year" three nights later in a 3–1 loss against his former team the Moose Jaw Warriors. Love would sit out due to injury multiple times during the season, including during their first-round matchup against the Portland Winterhawks during the 2005 WHL playoffs.

Love was a fan favourite in Everett, earning their respect in the new hockey market through his physical play and willingness to defend his teammates. His name is still shouted by fans of the team during the playing of O Canada.

On November 22, 2019, Love's jersey number was retired by the Silvertips. Love was the first, and so far only player to have his number retired by the team.

=== Professional ===
==== 2005–2008: Colorado Avalanche farm system ====
After going undrafted in the NHL, and aging out of the WHL, Love was signed to an entry-level contract by the Colorado Avalanche, and joined their AHL affiliate, the Lowell Lock Monsters for the 2005–06 season, suiting up for 27 out of the 80 games that season. Love's professional debut came on October 14, 2005, in a 4–2 win against the Manchester Monarchs. Love's point production dropped significantly in the transition to playing professionally, only notching four assists in his rookie season, less than a third of his points per game as compared to the previous season playing for the Silvertips.

Prior to the 2006–07 season, the Lock Monsters were purchased and renamed the Lowell Devils by the New Jersey Devils, forcing the Avalanche to select a new AHL affiliate with the Albany River Rats. Love scored his first professional goal on January 17, 2007, in a game against the Norfolk Admirals. During the season, Love again struggled to produce points, managing only one goal and six assists in 69 games. However Love compensated for this with his physical style of play, accruing 184 penalty minutes, including 23 fighting majors, one less than the league leader.

Ahead of the 2007–08 season, the Avalanche again changed AHL affiliates, this time to the Lake Erie Monsters for their inaugural season. During the pre-season at Avalanche training camp, Love fought teammates multiple times, including Brandon Straub, Ryan Smyth, and Ian Laperrière. Ultimately, Love would again spend the entire season in the minors, spending most of his time with the Monsters, but also playing a handful of games with the Avalanche's second tier minor league affiliate: the Johnstown Chiefs of the ECHL. Love's points per game, as well as penalty minutes per game would see a slight increase during the season, with seven points and 229 penalty minutes in 63 games between the AHL and ECHL. During the season, Love would serve a one-game suspension due to his actions in a game against the Syracuse Crunch on April 8, 2008.

==== 2008–2010: Houston and Peoria ====
After his entry-level contract expired, the Avalanche opted not to re-sign Love, marking an end to his time in an NHL system. Love opted to sign an AHL contract with the Houston Aeros for the 2008–09 season after attending their training camp, reuniting with his former coach from Everett, Kevin Constantine. In Houston, Love collected a professional single-league career high of 214 penalty minutes, including a league-leading 34 fights. During the season with the Aeros, Love transitioned to playing left wing, ostensibly to cover for an injury-battered team, but he would continue to play as a winger for the remainder of his time on the ice. Love would play with the Aeros during their deep playoff run, scoring one goal and accruing 32 penalty minutes in 16 games.

Love earned himself a professional tryout with the St. Louis Blues during their 2009 training camp, but ultimately signed with their AHL affiliate, the Peoria Rivermen for the 2009–10 season. Once again, Love was towards the top of the team in terms of fights and penalty minutes; with 17 fights and 129 penalty minutes respectively. However, Love's point production declined further, managing only one goal and three assists in 60 games played, the lowest points per game season of his professional career.

Due to AHL developmental rules, there is a limit to the number of veteran players allowed on a team's roster per game, with 260 professional games played being the most common cutoff point for veteran status. This rule significantly limits the ability of many players to remain in the AHL as they age. As a result of this rule, as well as his diminishing production in terms of both scoring and fights in the previous season, Love was not offered a contract in the AHL for the 2010–11 season.

==== 2010–2011: Central Hockey League ====
On September 8, 2010, Love was signed as a free agent by the Bossier-Shreveport Mudbugs of the Central Hockey League (CHL). Love played with the team for most of the season, posting 14 fights, as well as 110 penalty minutes through 43 games played. Due to a season-ending double hip surgery, Love did not play during the playoffs, where the Mudbugs would capture the Ray Miron President's Cup. The Mudbugs organization folded immediately following their championship in the 2011 playoffs, leaving Love without a team. Opting not to continue his playing career, Love announced his retirement on August 13, 2011.

== Coaching career ==
=== WHL ===
==== 2011–2018: Return to Everett ====
On August 13, 2011, Love was hired by the Everett Silvertips as the strength and conditioning coach, as well an assistant coach, primarily to work with the defensemen. Over his tenure as an assistant coach, Love's defensive experience helped the team to have the lowest goals against on average for three consecutive seasons. In all, Love would spend seven years coaching with the team, remaining through multiple head-coach changes.

==== 2018–2021: Saskatoon Blades ====
On May 30, 2018, Love was hired on as the head coach of the WHL's Saskatoon Blades beginning with the 2018–19 season. Love coached the Blades for three seasons, including leading them to the playoffs in his first season after the team had failed to make the playoffs for the previous five years. Love was overall successful with the Blades, leading them to a 0.665 points percentage over his three season span.

=== Professional ===
On July 12, 2021, Love announced he had accepted a position with the Calgary Flames to be the head coach of their American Hockey League affiliate, the Stockton Heat, beginning with the 2021–22 season. Love had a successful first season behind the bench of the Heat, leading them to 1st place in the Pacific division and capturing the Louis A. R. Pieri Memorial Award as the league's most outstanding coach.

After a successful initial campaign, Love would remain with the team during their relocation to become the Calgary Wranglers ahead of the 2022 –23 season. During his second season with the Flames affiliate, Love led the team to the regular season championship and the ninth best regular season AHL record of all time, capturing the Macgregor Kilpatrick Trophy. Due to the Wranglers success in the first half of the season, Love was selected to coach the Pacific division during the season's All-star classic. Love was also awarded the Louis A. R. Pieri Memorial Award for the second season in a row, becoming one of only three coaches to win the award in back to back seasons and the only coach to ever do so in his first two seasons in the AHL.

On June 22, 2023, Love was named an assistant coach for the Washington Capitals of the NHL, primarily to work with the defensemen.

On September 14, 2025, the Capitals announced that the team was putting Love on leave pending the completion of a league investigation. A reason for the investigation was not given. On October 26, the NHL announced that Love would be suspended for the remainder of the 2025–26 season. He was fired by the Capitals the same day.

=== KHL ===
Amidst his suspension, on January 17, 2026, Love was named as the head coach for the Shanghai Dragons in the Kontinental Hockey League (KHL), signing a 1.5-year contract. He replaces Gerard Gallant, who stepped down four days prior due to health issues.

=== International ===
Love has represented Canada from behind the bench several times, most recently as an assistant coach for the 2021 World Junior Ice Hockey Championships, where the team captured a silver medal. Love also served as an assistant coach for the 2020 World Juniors, with the team winning the gold medal.

Previously Love served as an assistant coach for Canada's U-18 team at the 2018 Hlinka Gretzky Cup, helping to lead the team to a gold medal. Love was also named an assistant coach for one of Canada's U-17 teams at the 2015 and 2016 editions of the World U-17 Hockey Challenge, capturing gold with Team Canada White in 2015.

== Playing style ==
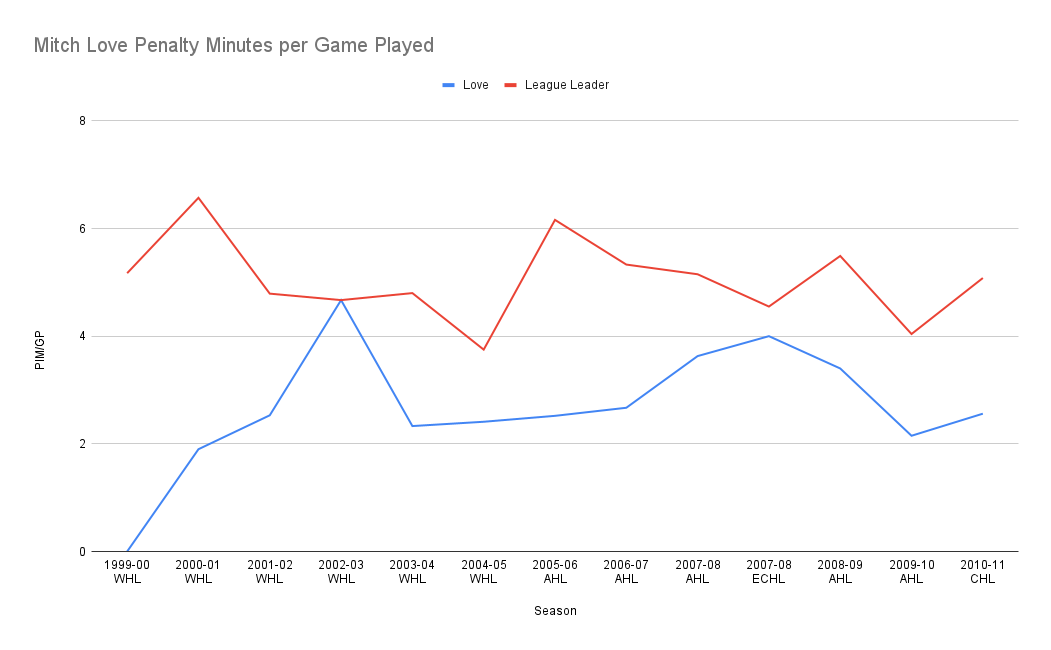
Love's penalty minutes per game compared to the league leader by season

Love played an extremely physical game, leading him to be described as a "blue-collar player", and a grinder. Generally, Love was not known for his playing skill, but was noted as a team-first player, and emotional leader.

Standing 5'11" and weighing only 175 pounds, Love was considered undersized, especially for a player with his physicality. Despite his size disadvantage, he rarely declined an invitation to fight.

Towards the end of Love's playing career, he transitioned from a defenseman to playing left-wing. At the time the move was explained as being due to a significant number of injured wingers on the team, but Love would later describe the move as being told he "wasn't good enough to be a defenceman, so they tried to hide me up front on the fourth line."

== Personal life ==
During the off-season, Love lives in Arizona with his wife, Joy Love, and is an avid golfer. Previously, Love had resided in Everett, Washington, for several years, ever since his time playing for the Silvertips.

== Career statistics ==
			Regular season					Playoffs
Season	Team	League	GP	G	A	Pts	PIM	GP	G	A	Pts	PIM
1999–00	Moose Jaw Warriors	WHL	2	0	0	0	0	—	—	—	—	—
2000–01	Moose Jaw Warriors	WHL	51	5	4	9	97	4	0	0	0	2
2001–02	Moose Jaw Warriors	WHL	16	0	1	1	40	—	—	—	—	—
2001–02	Swift Current Broncos	WHL	52	5	11	16	132	12	0	0	0	37
2002–03	Swift Current Broncos	WHL	70	2	15	17	327	4	1	0	1	16
2003–04	Everett Silvertips	WHL	70	12	15	27	163	21	2	6	8	47
2004–05	Everett Silvertips	WHL	59	9	20	29	142	4	0	2	2	6
2005–06	Lowell Lock Monsters	AHL	27	0	4	4	68	—	—	—	—	—
2006–07	Albany River Rats	AHL	69	1	5	6	184	—	—	—	—	—
2007–08	Lake Erie Monsters	AHL	59	2	5	7	213	—	—	—	—	—
2007–08	Johnstown Chiefs	ECHL	4	0	0	0	16	—	—	—	—	—
2008–09	Houston Aeros	AHL	63	2	4	6	214	16	1	0	1	32
2009–10	Peoria Rivermen	AHL	60	1	3	4	129	—	—	—	—	—
2010–11	Bossier-Shreveport Mudbugs	CHL	43	1	2	3	110	—	—	—	—	—
AHL totals			278	6	21	27	808	16	1	0	1	32

== Head coaching record ==
=== AHL ===
Team	Year	Regular season							Postseason
Team	Year	G	W	L	OTL	SL	Pts	Finish	Result
Stockton Heat	2021–22	68	45	16	5	2	97	1st in Pacific	Lost in conference finals
Calgary Wranglers	2022–23	72	51	17	3	1	106	1st in Pacific	Lost in division finals
Total		140	96	33	9	3	203		2 playoffs appearances

=== WHL ===
Team	Year	Regular season							Postseason
Team	Year	G	W	L	OTL	SL	Pts	Finish	Result
Saskatoon Blades	2018–19	68	45	15	8	0	98	2nd in East	Lost in conference semifinals
Saskatoon Blades	2019–20	64	34	24	2	3	73	4th in East	Playoffs cancelled due to COVID-19 pandemic
Saskatoon Blades	2020–21	24	16	5	2	1	35	— (Note: The 2020–21 WHL regular season was shortened, started late, then was cancelled early, and no playoffs were held, due to the ongoing COVID-19 pandemic. The Saskatoon Blades were in a mathematical position to finish anywhere from first to third in the East Division when the season was cancelled.)	No playoffs held
Total		156	95	44	12	4	206		1 playoff appearance

== Awards and honours ==
Award	Year	Ref
AHL
Louis A. R. Pieri Memorial Award	2022, 2023	
Everett Silvertips
No. 2 retired	2019	
