= Golden Amur =

Defunct professional ice hockey team

- City: Khabarovsk
- League: Asia League Ice Hockey
- Founded: 2004
- Dissolved: 2005
- Home arena: Platinum Arena (capacity: 7100)
- Owner: Amur Mining Company

The Golden Amur (Russian: Голден Амур) is a defunct professional ice hockey team from Khabarovsk, Russia. Golden Amur played one season as a member of Asia League Ice Hockey during the 2004-05 season. The Amur, a gold mining company which owned the team, suspended operations due to financial difficulties. The team played at the Platinum Arena, constructed in 2003 with 7,100 seats. The Amur finished third place of eight teams during the regular season, and were eliminated in the first round of the playoffs, losing three games to none to Kokudo.

Vladimir Putin visiting Golden Amur's youth team in 2004

== Honours ==
Asia League Ice Hockey

- 3rd place (1): 2004/05
