= Igor Varitsky =

Russian ice hockey player (born 1971)

- Born: April 25, 1971 (age 54) Chelyabinsk, URS
- Height: 5 ft 8 in (173 cm)
- Weight: 179 lb (81 kg; 12 st 11 lb)
- Position: Forward
- Shot: Right
- Played for: Traktor Chelyabinsk; Metallurg Magnitogorsk; Severstal Cherepovets; Salavat Yulayev Ufa; Avtomobilist Yekaterinburg
- National team: Russia
- Playing career: 1988–2008

Igor Konstantinovich Varitsky (Russian: Игорь Константинович Варицкий) is an ice hockey executive and retired player who played in the Soviet Hockey League. He is currently the general manager for the Shanghai Dragons, and formerly held that role for Traktor Chelyabinsk and HC Vityaz. He has been praised by sports journalists for scouting European and North American players for the KHL. Varitsky was born on April 25, 1971, in Chelyabinsk, Soviet Union and played for Traktor Chelyabinsk, Severstal Cherepovets, and Metallurg Magnitogorsk. He was inducted into the Russian and Soviet Hockey Hall of Fame in 1993.

Varitsky was the world champion in 1993 and he also won the Russian Cup in 1998.

== Career statistics ==
=== Regular season and playoffs ===
			Regular season					Playoffs
Season	Team	League	GP	G	A	Pts	PIM	GP	G	A	Pts	PIM
1988–89	Traktor Chelyabinsk	URS	1	0	0	0	0	—	—	—	—	—
1988–89	Metallurg Chelyabinsk	URS.2	17	2	1	3	6	—	—	—	—	—
1989–90	Metallurg Chelyabinsk	URS.2	50	12	9	21	20	—	—	—	—	—
1990–91	Mechel Chelyabinsk	URS.2	54	17	10	27	34	—	—	—	—	—
1991–92	Traktor Chelyabinsk	CIS	36	7	4	11	8	8	3	3	6	4
1991–92	Mechel Chelyabinsk	CIS.2	4	0	1	1	2	—	—	—	—	—
1992–93	Traktor Chelyabinsk	IHL	41	24	15	39	14	8	3	2	5	8
1993–94	Traktor Chelyabinsk	IHL	43	19	22	41	28	6	4	4	8	2
1994–95	Traktor Chelyabinsk	IHL	51	26	21	47	26	3	3	0	3	4
1995–96	Kassel Huskies	DEL	21	6	4	10	10	—	—	—	—	—
1995–96	EC Hannover	DEL	22	11	12	23	14	3	0	2	2	2
1995–96	Metallurg Magnitogorsk	IHL	3	0	1	1	0	8	1	2	3	0
1996–97	Metallurg Magnitogorsk	RSL	44	13	16	29	32	11	2	4	6	6
1997–98	Metallurg Magnitogorsk	RSL	33	2	12	14	43	—	—	—	—	—
1997–98	Metallurg–2 Magnitogorsk	RUS.3	1	0	0	0	0	—	—	—	—	—
1997–98	Lada Togliatti	RSL	—	—	—	—	—	4	1	0	1	4
1998–99	HC Vítkovice	ELH	50	10	24	34	45	4	2	1	3	4
1999–2000	Severstal Cherepovets	RSL	33	4	11	15	10	7	1	0	1	2
2000–01	Severstal Cherepovets	RSL	36	7	7	14	14	9	0	1	1	0
2000–01	Severstal–2 Cherepovets	RUS.3	1	0	2	2	0	—	—	—	—	—
2001–02	Severstal Cherepovets	RSL	15	1	0	1	4	—	—	—	—	—
2001–02	Severstal–2 Cherepovets	RUS.3	4	3	2	5	2	—	—	—	—	—
2001–02	Mechel Chelyabinsk	RSL	19	3	7	10	18	—	—	—	—	—
2002–03	Mechel Chelyabinsk	RSL	51	14	10	24	26	—	—	—	—	—
2003–04	Salavat Yulaev Ufa	RSL	57	7	11	18	32	—	—	—	—	—
2003–04	Salavat Yulaev–2 Ufa	RUS.3	4	3	2	5	0	—	—	—	—	—
2004–05	Traktor Chelyabinsk	RUS.2	43	14	12	26	32	4	0	0	0	0
2005–06	Mechel Chelyabinsk	RUS.2	45	11	22	33	58	4	0	1	1	4
2006–07	Avtomobilist Yekaterinburg	RUS.2	56	16	37	53	44	7	3	3	6	4
2007–08	Avtomobilist Yekaterinburg	RUS.2	37	10	17	27	24	—	—	—	—	—
IHL totals			138	69	59	128	68	25	11	8	19	14
RSL totals			288	51	74	125	179	31	4	5	9	12

=== International ===
Year	Team	Event	Result	GP	G	A	Pts	PIM
1993	Russia	WC	1st place, gold medalist(s)	8	0	0	0	0
1994	Russia	OG	4th	8	1	1	2	2
Senior totals				16	1	1	2	2
