= 1953–54 Soviet League season =

Soviet ice hockey season

The 1953–54 Soviet Championship League season was the eighth season of the Soviet Championship League, the top level of ice hockey in the Soviet Union. Nine teams participated in the league, and Dynamo Moscow won the championship.

== Standings ==
	Club	GP	W	T	L	GF	GA	Pts
1.	Dynamo Moscow	16	15	0	1	118	36	30
2.	CDSA Moscow	16	13	1	2	140	26	27
3.	Zenit Moscow	16	10	3	3	93	41	23
4.	ODO Leningrad	16	9	3	4	86	61	21
5.	KKM Elektrostal	16	6	3	7	63	97	15
6.	Daugava Riga	16	5	1	10	50	90	11
7.	Avangard Chelyabinsk	16	3	2	11	36	78	8
8.	Dynamo Leningrad	16	3	1	12	52	96	7
9.	Dynamo Sverdlovsk	16	1	0	15	31	114	2
