= Nick Cicek =

Canadian-Turkish ice hockey player

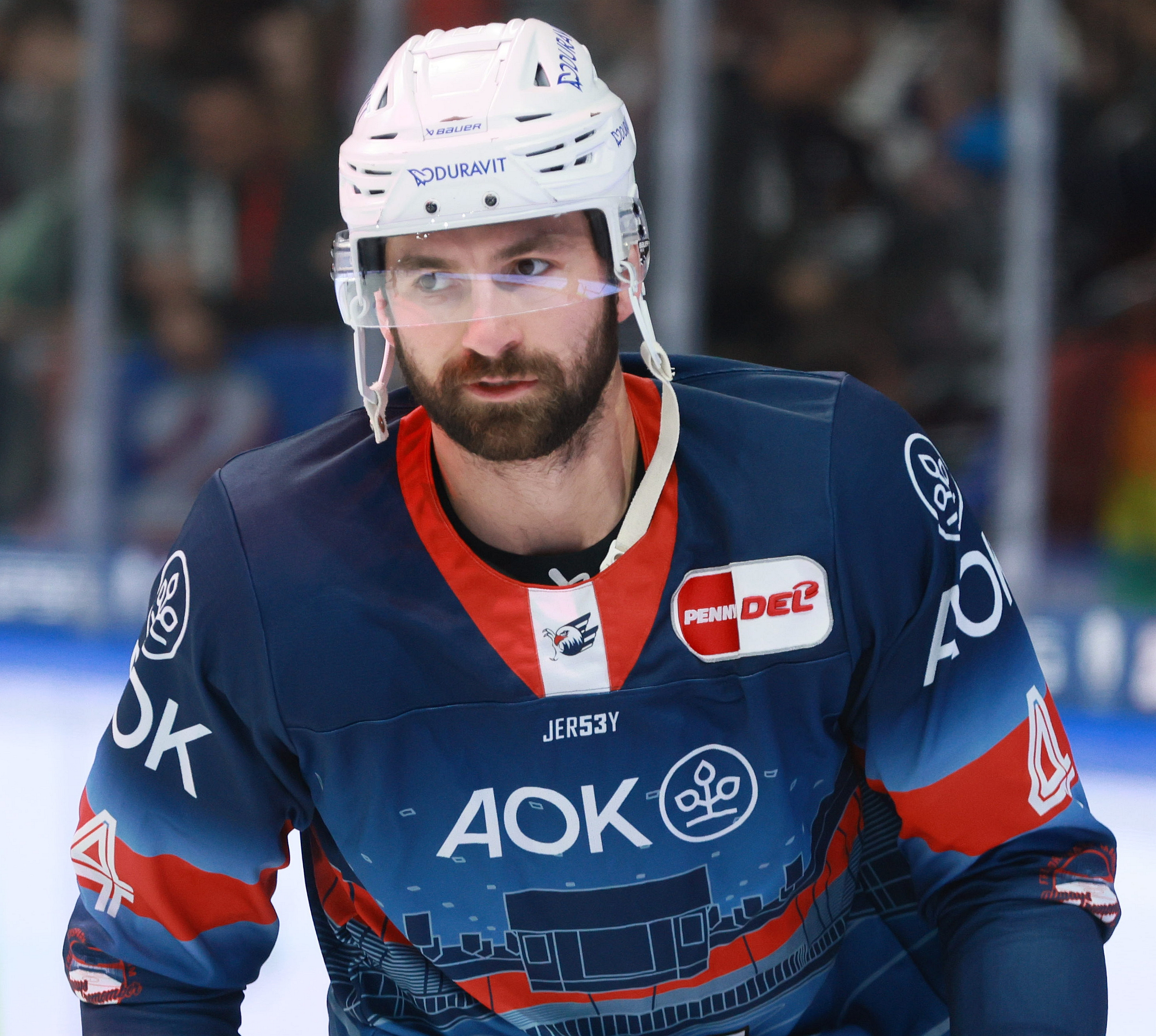
- Nick Cicek, 2025
- Born: May 29, 2000 (age 26) Winnipeg, Manitoba, Canada
- Height: 6 ft 3 in (191 cm)
- Weight: 201 lb (91 kg; 14 st 5 lb)
- Position: Defence
- Shoots: Left
- KHL team Former teams: Shanghai Dragons; San Jose Sharks; Adler Mannheim
- NHL draft: Undrafted
- Playing career: 2021–present

Nicholas Cicek (born May 29, 2000) is a Canadian-Turkish professional ice hockey defenceman for the Shanghai Dragons in the Kontinental Hockey League (KHL). He has formerly played in the National Hockey League (NHL) with the San Jose Sharks.

== Playing career ==
Cicek originally played junior hockey in his home city of Winnipeg before he was selected in the seventh round, 149th overall, of the 2015 WHL Bantam Draft by the Portland Winterhawks. He played the Winnipeg Wild in the Manitoba U-18 'AAA' Hockey League (MMHL) and Winnipeg Blues of the Manitoba Junior Hockey League (MJHL) before making his major junior debut with Portland.

He appeared in parts of four seasons with the Winterhawks in the Western Hockey League (WHL), captaining the club in his final season in 2020–21, while notching career highs in assists and points despite the shortened COVID-19 affected campaign.

An undrafted free agent having completed his junior career, Cicek began his professional career by signing a one-year AHL contract with the San Jose Barracuda on May 20, 2021. He immediately joined the Barracuda on an amateur try-out contract for the remainder of the 2020–21 season.

In his first full professional season in 2021–22, Cicek continued his late-blooming development, quickly establishing himself within the Barracuda blueline to finish second in points and finish 9th in league scoring among rookie defencemen with 5 goals and 25 points through 53 regular season games. On April 12, 2022, Cicek signed his first NHL contract, agreeing to a two-year, entry-level deal with the Barracuda's affiliate, the San Jose Sharks.

Cicek was reassigned by the Sharks to the Barracuda to begin the 2022–23 season. After 10 scoreless games with the Barracuda, Cicek received his first recall to the NHL on November 15, 2022. He immediately made his NHL debut with the Sharks that night, playing in a top-four pairing role in a 5–2 defeat against the Vegas Golden Knights. In just his second game, he registered his first point, an assist on a goal to Matt Nieto, during a 7–4 defeat to the Detroit Red Wings on November 17, 2022.

On December 15, 2023, Cicek was traded to the Vancouver Canucks along with a sixth-round pick in the 2024 NHL entry draft in exchange for Jack Studnicka.

At the conclusion of his contract with the Canucks, Cicek left as a free agent and signed his first contract abroad, joining German club Adler Mannheim of the Deutsche Eishockey Liga (DEL) on a one-year deal on July 18, 2024. In the 2024–25 season, Cicek appeared in 50 games with three goals and 14 assists for 17 points along with 79 penalty minutes. Cicek would skate in an additional 10 playoff contests for Mannheim, recording two points from one goal and one assist.

A free agent, Cicek returned to North America, securing a one-year, two-way contract with the Calgary Flames for the 2025–26 season on July 1, 2025. Cicek played out the entirety of his contract with the Flames affiliate, the Calgary Wranglers of the AHL, posting 7 goals and 25 points through 70 appearances.

Having completed his tenure with the Flames, Cicek opted to return abroad after securing a one-year contract with Chinese outfit, Shanghai Dragons of the KHL, on July 9, 2026.

== Personal ==
Cicek's father, Nazim, is from Turkey, and thus he holds both Canadian and Turkish citizenship. He played for Turkey in the 2017 European Youth Olympic Festival when he was 16. Cicek's younger brother, Michael, plays major junior hockey with the Kelowna Rockets in the WHL.

== Career statistics ==
			Regular season					Playoffs
Season	Team	League	GP	G	A	Pts	PIM	GP	G	A	Pts	PIM
2015–16	Winnipeg Wild	MMHL	3	0	1	1	0	4	1	1	2	10
2016–17	Winnipeg Wild	MMHL	34	3	21	24	87	11	2	7	9	26
2017–18	Winnipeg Blues	MJHL	34	6	10	16	104	12	1	2	3	12
2017–18	Portland Winterhawks	WHL	7	0	0	0	6	—	—	—	—	—
2018–19	Portland Winterhawks	WHL	44	0	13	13	54	5	0	2	2	0
2019–20	Portland Winterhawks	WHL	63	4	10	14	91	—	—	—	—	—
2020–21	Portland Winterhawks	WHL	24	5	16	21	46	—	—	—	—	—
2021–22	San Jose Barracuda	AHL	53	5	20	25	62	—	—	—	—	—
2022–23	San Jose Barracuda	AHL	37	1	2	3	38	—	—	—	—	—
2022–23	San Jose Sharks	NHL	16	0	4	4	15	—	—	—	—	—
2023–24	San Jose Barracuda	AHL	18	1	2	3	21	—	—	—	—	—
2023–24	Abbotsford Canucks	AHL	49	3	11	14	52	6	0	2	2	2
2024–25	Adler Mannheim	DEL	50	3	14	17	79	10	1	1	2	17
2025–26	Calgary Wranglers	AHL	70	7	18	25	119	—	—	—	—	—
NHL totals			16	0	4	4	15	—	—	—	—	—

== Awards and honours ==
Award	Year
MMHL
First All-Star Team	2017
