= Givani Smith =

Canadian ice hockey player (born 1998)

- Born: February 27, 1998 (age 28) Toronto, Ontario, Canada
- Height: 6 ft 2 in (188 cm)
- Weight: 214 lb (97 kg; 15 st 4 lb)
- Position: Winger
- Shoots: Left
- KHL team Former teams: Shanghai Dragons; Detroit Red Wings; Florida Panthers; San Jose Sharks; Colorado Avalanche
- NHL draft: 46th overall, 2016; Detroit Red Wings
- Playing career: 2018–present

Givani Smith (born February 27, 1998) is a Canadian-Jamaican professional ice hockey player who is a winger for the Shanghai Dragons in the Kontinental Hockey League (KHL).

== Playing career ==
Before turning professional, Smith played four seasons in the Ontario Hockey League. In 236 games between the Barrie Colts, Guelph Storm, and Kitchener Rangers, he recorded 73 goals, 62 assists, and 411 penalty minutes. He led the league in penalty minutes in 2015–16 and 2016–17. During the 2018–19 season in his rookie year, he recorded six goals and seven assists in 64 games for the Grand Rapids Griffins of the American Hockey League (AHL).

On October 25, 2019, Smith was recalled by the Detroit Red Wings. Before being recalled he recorded two goals and two assists in four games for the Griffins. He made his NHL debut for the Red Wings later that night in a game against the Buffalo Sabres where he recorded two shots on goal and one hit in 11:01 time on ice. Smith was assigned to the Griffins on October 30. He appeared in three games for the Red Wings, where he recorded four shots on goal and three hits in 10:32 average time on ice per game. On December 31, 2019, Smith was again recalled by the Red Wings. Before being recalled he recorded four goals and nine assists in 22 games with the Griffins. On January 14, 2020, Smith scored his first career NHL goal against Thomas Greiss of the New York Islanders. On February 16, 2021, Smith was reassigned to the Griffins. Before being reassigned he recorded one goal and three assists, 11 penalty minutes, 10 shots on goal and 15 hits in 9:55 average time on ice in eight games for the Red Wings.

On December 19, 2022, the Red Wings traded Smith to the Florida Panthers in exchange for Michael Del Zotto. Before being traded, he recorded two goals and three assists in 19 games for the Griffins during the 2022–23 season. He also appeared in two games for the Red Wings.

On July 1, 2023, Smith left the Panthers as a free agent and was signed by the San Jose Sharks to a two-year, $1.6 million contract, beginning in the 2023–24 season. He scored his first goal for the Sharks on November 16 against the St. Louis Blues, and in the process became the 300th Shark to score a goal for the franchise. Remaining on the Sharks roster for the entirety of the season, Smith made 36 appearances, matching a seasons best of 3 assists for the fourth time in his career.

In the following 2024–25 season, Smith began the season primarily serving as a healthy scratch for the Sharks. Featuring in just 6 games through the first quarter of the season, Smith was placed on waivers on December 8, 2024. Upon clearing waivers, Smith was included in a trade by the Sharks to the Colorado Avalanche on December 9, 2024. The Avalanche received Smith, Mackenzie Blackwood and a 2027 fifth-round pick in exchange for Alexandar Georgiev, Nikolai Kovalenko, a conditional fifth-round 2025 pick, and a second-round pick in the 2026 NHL entry draft. He made his debut the following day in a fourth-line role, helping the Avalanche to a 6–2 victory over the Pittsburgh Penguins. Smith went scoreless through 7 games with the Avalanche before he was re-assigned to AHL affiliate, the Colorado Eagles, on December 28, 2024.

Smith remained with the Eagles until the NHL trade deadline when he was dealt by the Avalanche to the Philadelphia Flyers in exchange for Erik Johnson on March 7, 2025. He was immediately assigned to continue in the AHL with affiliate, the Lehigh Valley Phantoms.

As a free agent from the Flyers, Smith went un-signed over the summer. Approaching the 2025–26 season, he accepted an invitation from the Carolina Hurricanes to attend training camp on a professional tryout on August 28, 2025. After a successful tryout with the Hurricanes, Smith was then signed to a one-year, $775k contract. Assigned to the Chicago Wolves of the duration of his tenure within the Hurricanes, Smith posted 2 goals and 5 points in just 25 appearances.

Having played his professional career entirely in North America, Smith was signed his first contract abroad in agreeing to a one-year deal with Chinese KHL outfilt, Shanghai Dragons, on July 2, 2026.

== Personal life ==
Smith is of Jamaican descent and has played for the country in the Amerigol LATAM Cup. He is the younger brother of NHL player Gemel Smith.

== Career statistics ==
=== Regular season and playoffs ===
			Regular season					Playoffs
Season	Team	League	GP	G	A	Pts	PIM	GP	G	A	Pts	PIM
2013–14	Mississauga Senators	GTMMHL	26	9	8	17	71	7	4	4	8	4
2014–15	Barrie Colts	OHL	31	0	4	4	20	—	—	—	—	—
2014–15	Guelph Storm	OHL	30	7	8	15	56	9	2	3	5	10
2015–16	Guelph Storm	OHL	65	23	19	42	146	—	—	—	—	—
2016–17	Guelph Storm	OHL	64	26	18	44	139	—	—	—	—	—
2016–17	Grand Rapids Griffins	AHL	3	0	0	0	2	—	—	—	—	—
2017–18	Guelph Storm	OHL	19	8	3	11	14	—	—	—	—	—
2017–18	Kitchener Rangers	OHL	27	9	10	19	36	18	11	7	18	22
2018–19	Grand Rapids Griffins	AHL	64	6	7	13	86	4	0	2	2	9
2019–20	Grand Rapids Griffins	AHL	37	9	10	19	75	—	—	—	—	—
2019–20	Detroit Red Wings	NHL	21	2	1	3	9	—	—	—	—	—
2020–21	Detroit Red Wings	NHL	16	1	3	4	21	—	—	—	—	—
2020–21	Grand Rapids Griffins	AHL	25	9	6	15	54	—	—	—	—	—
2021–22	Detroit Red Wings	NHL	46	4	3	7	108	—	—	—	—	—
2022–23	Grand Rapids Griffins	AHL	19	2	3	5	45	—	—	—	—	—
2022–23	Detroit Red Wings	NHL	2	0	0	0	0	—	—	—	—	—
2022–23	Florida Panthers	NHL	34	1	3	4	72	1	0	0	0	2
2022–23	Charlotte Checkers	AHL	3	0	0	0	4	—	—	—	—	—
2023–24	San Jose Sharks	NHL	36	1	3	4	40	—	—	—	—	—
2024–25	San Jose Sharks	NHL	6	0	0	0	10	—	—	—	—	—
2024–25	Colorado Avalanche	NHL	7	0	0	0	8	—	—	—	—	—
2024–25	Colorado Eagles	AHL	6	0	1	1	12	—	—	—	—	—
2024–25	Lehigh Valley Phantoms	AHL	10	1	1	2	9	7	0	0	0	19
2025–26	Chicago Wolves	AHL	25	2	3	5	70	—	—	—	—	—
NHL totals			168	9	13	22	268	1	0	0	0	2

=== International ===
Year	Team	Event	Result	GP	G	A	Pts	PIM
2014	Canada Red	U17	6th	5	0	0	0	16
Junior totals				5	0	0	0	16
