= Shanghai Dragons =

Professional ice hockey club based in Shang, China

- City: Shanghai, China; Saint Petersburg, Russia
- League: KHL
- Conference: Western
- Division: Tarasov
- Founded: 2025
- Home arena: SKA Arena (capacity: 22,500)
- Colours
- General manager: Evgeny Artyukhin
- Head coach: Mitch Love
- Website: hc-dragons.com

Franchise history
- 2016–2025: Kunlun Red Star
- 2025–present: Shanghai Dragons

The Shanghai Dragons (Russian: Шанхай Дрэгонс; Chinese: 上海龙之队; pinyin: Shànghǎi Lóngzhīduì) are a professional ice hockey team nominally based in Shanghai, China, and playing their home games at SKA Arena in Saint Petersburg. It is a member of the Tarasov Division in the Kontinental Hockey League (KHL). They joined the KHL as Kunlun Red Star prior to the 2016–17 season, moving to Shanghai on 7 August 2025.

== History ==
The team, originally known as Kunlun Red Star, was established as part of China's preparations for the 2022 Winter Olympics in Beijing. In March 2016, representatives of Kunlun Red Star and the KHL signed a protocol of intent to have a Chinese-based team enter the KHL. The protocol was signed by the representative from the Ice Hockey Federation of Russia Vladislav Tretiak, the chairman of the KHL Gennady Timchenko, and the board of Kunlun Red Star. In mid-April, the president of the International Ice Hockey Federation, René Fasel, expressed hope that this would help China bring their hockey to a higher level. However, despite the high ambitions, the team only made the playoffs once, in 2017, and stopped playing games in China starting in the 2019–20 season due to the effects of the COVID-19 pandemic in the country.

The team's original logo from 2025–2026

After playing their games in Mytishchi Arena outside of Moscow since August 2020, the team announced they would play at SKA Arena in Saint Petersburg for the 2025–26 season, with the intent of returning to China the next year. On 7 August 2025, with Kunlun undergoing new ownership, they announced rebranding as the Shanghai Dragons, while still based at St. Petersburg. Former HC Vityaz executive Igor Varitsky was brought as Shanghai's new general manager, and on 13 August 2025 Gerard Gallant was hired to lead the team. The Shanghai Dragons played their first preseason game on 29 August, beating HC Spartak Moscow 3–2 in their first game of the Moscow Mayor's Cup, a preseason competition. Two days later, the team defeated HC Dinamo Minsk 6–1 to clinch the bronze medal at the tournament. On 6 September, the Shanghai Dragons announced Spencer Foo as their inaugural captain, with Adam Clendening, Alexander Burmistrov, Jake Bischoff, and Ryan Spooner serving as alternate captains. That day, they played their first regular season game, defeating SKA Saint Petersburg 7–4 to claim their first win in franchise history.

== Season-by-season record ==
Note: GP = Games played, W = Wins, OTW = Overtime/shootout wins, OTL = Overtime/shootout losses, L = Losses, Pts = Points, GF = Goals for, GA = Goals against

Season	GP	W	OTW	OTL	L	Pts	GF	GA	Finish	Top scorer	Playoffs
2025–26	60	16	5	12	35	54	166	238	6th, Tarasov	Nick Merkley (45 points: 24 G, 21 A; 68 GP)	Did not qualify

== Players and personnel ==
=== Current roster ===
Updated 25 September 2026.

No.	Nat	Player	Pos	S/G	Age	Acquired	Birthplace
6	(Canada)	Calen Addison	D	R	26	2026	Brandon, Manitoba, Canada
59	(Russia)	Nikita Alexandrov	F	L	26	2026	Burgwedel, Germany
22	(Russia)	Vladislav Barulin	RW	R	30	2026	Moscow, Russia
96	(Russia)	Sergei Boikov (A)	D	R	30	2026	Khabarovsk, Russia
31	(Russia)	Vyacheslav Buteyets	G	L	24	2026	Chelyabinsk, Russia
9	(United States)	David Chen	F	R	23	2026	Livingston, New Jersey, United States
12	(Russia)	Artyom Chernov	F	L	29	2026	St. Petersburg, Russia
4	(Canada)	Nick Cicek	D	L	26	2026	Winnipeg, Manitoba, Canada
29	(Czech Republic)	Martin Frk (A)	RW	R	33	2026	Pelhřimov, Czech Republic
23	(Czech Republic)	Dmitrij Jaškin (C)	RW	L	33	2026	Omsk, Russia
30	(Russia)	Pavel Khomchenko	G	L	32	2026	Saratov, Russia
32	(Russia)	Stepan Khripunov	F	L	31	2026	Yekaterinburg, Russia
77	(Russia)	Pavel Koledov	D	R	32	2026	Achinsk, Russia
53	(Russia)	Mikhail Kotlyarevsky	F	R	29	2026	Chita, Russia
11	(Russia)	Vladimir Kuznetsov	LW	L	28	2025	Yekaterinburg, Russia
19	(Russia)	Daniil Malorosiyanov	D	R	21	2026	St. Petersburg, Russia
27	(United States)	Brennan Menell	D	R	29	2026	Woodbury, Minnesota, United States
63	(Russia)	Takhir Mingachyov	C	L	25	2026	Samara, Russia
21	(Canada)	Brett Murray	LW	L	28	2026	Bolton, Ontario, Canada
35	(Russia)	Amir Miftakhov	G	L	26	2026	Kazan, Russia
38	(Russia)	Mikhail Naumenkov (A)	D	R	33	2026	Moscow, Russia
2	(Canada)	Turner Ottenbreit	D	L	29	2026	Yorkton, Saskatchewan, Canada
7	(Canada)	Nic Petan (A)	C	L	31	2026	Delta, British Columbia, Canada
54	(Canada)	Givani Smith	F	R	28	2026	Toronto, Ontario, Canada
17	(Russia)	Yegor Solovyov	LW	R	21	2026	Moscow, Russia
37	(United States)	Nate Sucese	LW	L	30	2025	Fairport, New York, United States
14	(Canada)	Riley Sutter	RW	L	26	2025	Calgary, Alberta, Canada

=== Head coaches ===
- Gerard Gallant, 2025–2026
- Mitch Love, since 2026

=== General managers ===
- Igor Varitsky, 2025–2026
- Evgeny Artyukhin, since 2026

=== Team president ===
- Ilya Kovalchuk, since 2026

=== Team captains ===
- Spencer Foo, 2025–2026
- Dmitrij Jaškin, 2026–present
