= Platinum Arena =

Arena in Khabarovsk, Russia

- Платинум Арена
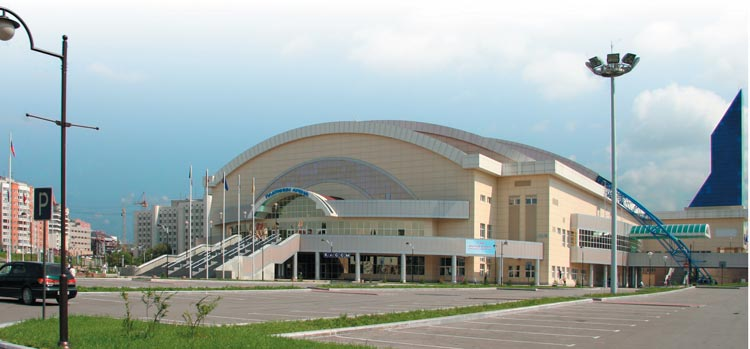
- Interactive map of Platinum Arena
- Location: Khabarovsk, Russia
- Coordinates: 48.484292°N 135.086253°E
- Capacity: 7,100 (ice hockey)

Construction
- Opened: 2003

Tenants
- Amur Khabarovsk (KHL) (2003-present); Golden Amur (ALIH) (2004-2005); Amurskie Tigry (2010-present)

The Platinum Arena (Russian: Платинум Арена) is an indoor arena located in Khabarovsk, the capital of Khabarovsk Krai in eastern Russia. The arena was opened in 2003 and has a capacity of 7,100. It is the home arena of the ice hockey team Amur Khabarovsk of the Kontinental Hockey League, and the former home of the Golden Amur hockey team of the Asia League Ice Hockey.

Vladimir Putin visiting the Golden Amur youth team in the Platinum Arena in 2004

== See also ==
- List of indoor arenas in Russia
- List of Kontinental Hockey League arenas
