= 1952–53 Soviet League season =

Ice hockey season

The 1952–53 Soviet Championship League season was the seventh season of the Soviet Championship League, the top level of ice hockey in the Soviet Union. Seventeen teams participated in the league, and VVS MVO Moscow won the championship.

== First round ==
=== Group A ===
	Club	GP	W	T	L	GF	GA	Pts
1.	VVS Moscow	5	5	0	0	38	2	10
2.	Khimik Elektrostal	5	4	0	1	16	17	8
3.	Dynamo Sverdlovsk	5	2	1	2	22	18	5
4.	Daugava Riga	5	1	1	3	13	16	3
5.	Torpedo Gorky	5	1	0	4	12	24	2
6.	Dünamo Tallinn	5	1	0	4	12	37	2

=== Group B ===
	Club	GP	W	T	L	GF	GA	Pts
1.	Krylya Sovetov Moscow	5	5	0	0	53	9	10
2.	Dynamo Moscow	5	4	0	1	37	10	8
3.	ODO Leningrad	5	3	0	2	25	23	6
4.	ODO Novosibirsk	5	2	0	3	22	33	4
5.	HC Spartak Minsk	5	1	0	4	12	34	2
6.	SK Sverdlova Molotov	5	0	0	5	13	53	0

=== Group C ===
	Club	GP	W	T	L	GF	GA	Pts
1.	CDSA Moscow	4	4	0	0	51	8	8
2.	Dynamo Leningrad	4	3	0	1	28	17	6
3.	Spartak Moscow	4	2	0	2	22	24	4
4.	Dzerzhinets Chelyabinsk	4	1	0	3	15	13	2
5.	Spartak Kalinin	4	0	0	4	3	57	0

== Final round ==
	Club	GP	W	T	L	GF	GA	Pts
1.	VVS Moscow	16	12	3	1	80	20	27
2.	CDSA Moscow	16	12	2	2	99	32	26
3.	Dynamo Moscow	16	12	1	3	107	47	25
4.	Krylya Sovetov Moscow	16	10	4	2	102	32	24
5.	ODO Leningrad	16	5	4	7	67	82	14
6.	Spartak Moscow	16	5	0	11	48	103	10
7.	Dynamo Leningrad	16	3	1	12	53	85	7
8.	Khimik Elektrostal	16	3	0	13	37	127	6
9.	Dynamo Sverdlovsk	16	2	1	13	37	103	5

== 7th place ==
	Club	GP	W	T	L	GF	GA	Pts
1.	Daugava Riga	7	6	0	1	59	18	12
2.	Dzerzhinets Chelyabinsk	7	6	0	1	47	23	12
3.	ODO Novosibirsk	7	5	1	1	52	16	11
4.	Torpedo Gorky	7	3	1	3	27	29	7
5.	Dünamo Tallinn	7	3	0	4	31	30	6
6.	SK Sverdlova Molotov	7	2	0	5	27	28	4
7.	HC Spartak Minsk	7	2	0	5	20	52	4
8.	Spartak Kalinin	7	0	0	7	14	81	0
