= 1951–52 Soviet League season =

Soviet ice hockey season

The 1951–52 Soviet Championship League season was the sixth season of the Soviet Championship League, the top level of ice hockey in the Soviet Union. 12 teams participated in the league, and VVS MVO Moscow won the championship.

== First round ==
=== Group A ===
	Club	GP	W	T	L	GF	GA	Pts
1.	Krylya Sovetov Moscow	6	5	1	0	37	13	11
2.	CDSA Moscow	6	4	1	1	29	16	9
3.	ODO Leningrad	6	2	0	4	19	34	4
4.	HC Spartak Moscow	6	0	0	6	11	33	0

=== Group B ===
	Club	GP	W	T	L	GF	GA	Pts
1.	HC Dynamo Moscow	6	5	0	1	35	9	10
2.	Daugava Riga	6	3	1	2	24	9	7
3.	Dynamo Sverdlovsk	6	3	1	2	23	27	7
4.	HC Spartak Minsk	6	0	0	6	6	43	0

=== Group C ===
	Club	GP	W	T	L	GF	GA	Pts
1.	VVS Moscow	6	6	0	0	69	9	12
2.	Dzerzhinets Chelyabinsk	6	3	1	2	19	36	7
3.	Dynamo Leningrad	6	1	1	4	15	38	3
4.	Dünamo Tallinn	6	1	0	5	14	34	2

== Final round ==
	Club	GP	W	T	L	GF	GA	Pts
1.	VVS Moscow	10	9	0	1	53	18	18
2.	CDSA Moscow	10	9	0	1	54	12	18
3.	HC Dynamo Moscow	10	5	1	4	37	29	11
4.	Krylya Sovetov Moscow	10	4	1	5	40	31	9
5.	Daugava Riga	10	1	0	9	19	51	2
6.	Dzerzhinets Chelyabinsk	10	1	0	9	16	78	2

=== Championship tiebreaker ===
VVS Moscow – CDSA Moscow 3:2

== 7th-12th place ==
	Club	GP	W	T	L	GF	GA	Pts
1.	HC Spartak Moscow	5	4	0	1	27	11	8
2.	ODO Leningrad	5	4	0	1	13	11	8
3.	Dynamo Leningrad	5	3	0	2	22	15	6
4.	Dünamo Tallinn	5	2	0	3	16	18	4
5.	Dynamo Sverdlovsk	5	2	0	3	17	21	4
6.	HC Spartak Minsk	5	0	0	5	10	29	0
