= Dmitri Tarasov (ice hockey) =

Russian ice hockey player (1979–2023)

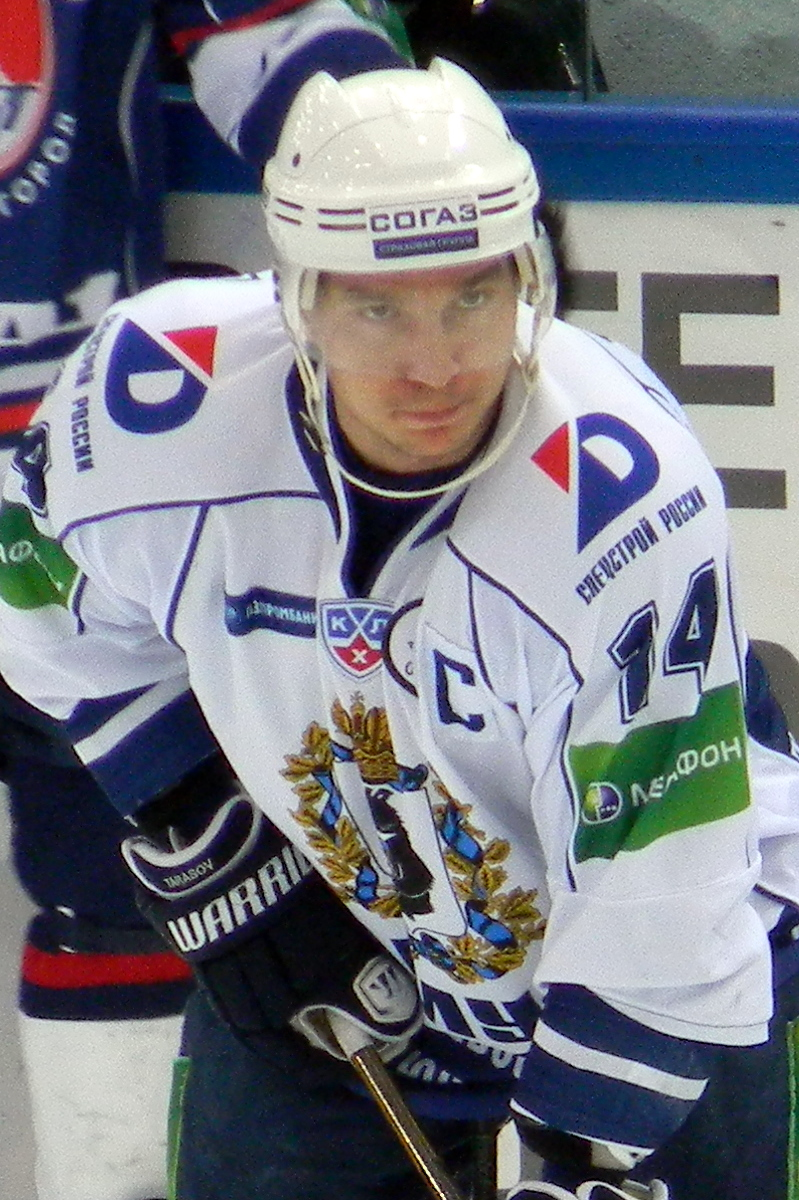
- Tarasov in 2012 with Amur Khabarovsk
- Born: 13 February 1979; Khabarovsk, Russian SFSR, USSR
- Died: 14 June 2023 (aged 44); Khabarovsk, Russia
- Height: 5 ft 10 in (178 cm)
- Weight: 181 lb (82 kg; 12 st 13 lb)
- Position: Left wing
- Shot: Left
- Played for: Amur Khabarovsk; Salavat Yulaev Ufa; Dynamo Moscow; Spartak Moscow; Sibir Novosibirsk
- Playing career: 1998–2016

Dmitri Yevgenyevich Tarasov (Russian: Дмитрий Евгеньевич Тарасов; 13 February 1979 – 14 June 2023) was a Russian professional ice hockey forward who most notably played for Amur Khabarovsk in the Kontinental Hockey League. He served as the captain for the club.

== Career ==
Tarasov began his career in the old Russian Super League with Amur Khabarovsk. The team suffered relegation to the Vysshaya Liga in 2004 but Tarasov continued to play for them until 2006 when he joined Salavat Yulaev Ufa. After two seasons, Tarasov joined HC Dynamo Moscow and moved to Spartak Moscow during the 2008–2009 season.

Tarasov later returned to his original club Amur Khabarovsk, and served 5 seasons as team captain. He signed a one-year extension to continue in Khabarovsk on 10 July 2015.

== Death ==
Tarasov died on 14 June 2023, at the age of 44.
