= Alexei Kopeikin =

Russian ice hockey player

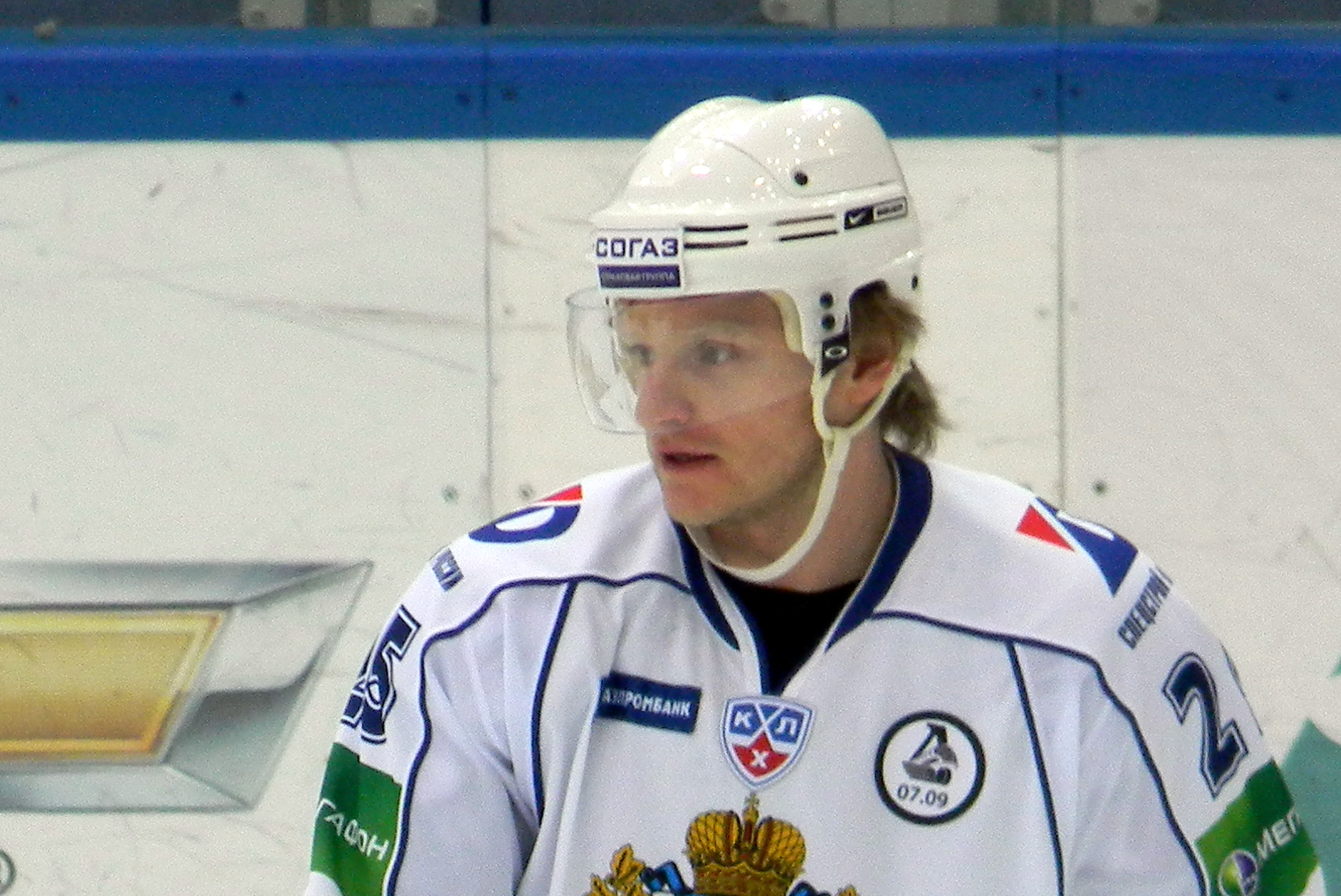
- Born: 29 August 1983 (age 41); Angarsk, USSR
- Height: 5 ft 10 in (178 cm)
- Weight: 183 lb (83 kg; 13 st 1 lb)
- Position: Forward
- Shot: Right
- Played for: Amur Khabarovsk; Spartak Moscow; Sibir Novosibirsk; Avangard Omsk; HC Vityaz
- Playing career: 2000–2018

Alexei Kopeikin (born 29 August 1983) is a Russian former professional ice hockey forward who played in the Kontinental Hockey League (KHL).

During his career he played four seasons as captain with HC Sibir Novosibirsk before joining HC Vityaz as a free agent on July 2, 2016.
