= Ruslan Khasanshin =

Russian ice hockey player

- Born: February 7, 1985 (age 40) Tolyatti, Russia
- Position: Centre
- Shot: Left
- KHL team: Metallurg Novokuznetsk
- NHL draft: Undrafted
- Playing career: 2010–2019

Ruslan Khasanshin (born February 7, 1985) is a professional ice hockey player who currently plays the 2010–11 season in the Kontinental Hockey League with Metallurg Novokuznetsk.
