= SKA Arena =

Multi-purpose indoor arena in Saint Petersburg, Russia

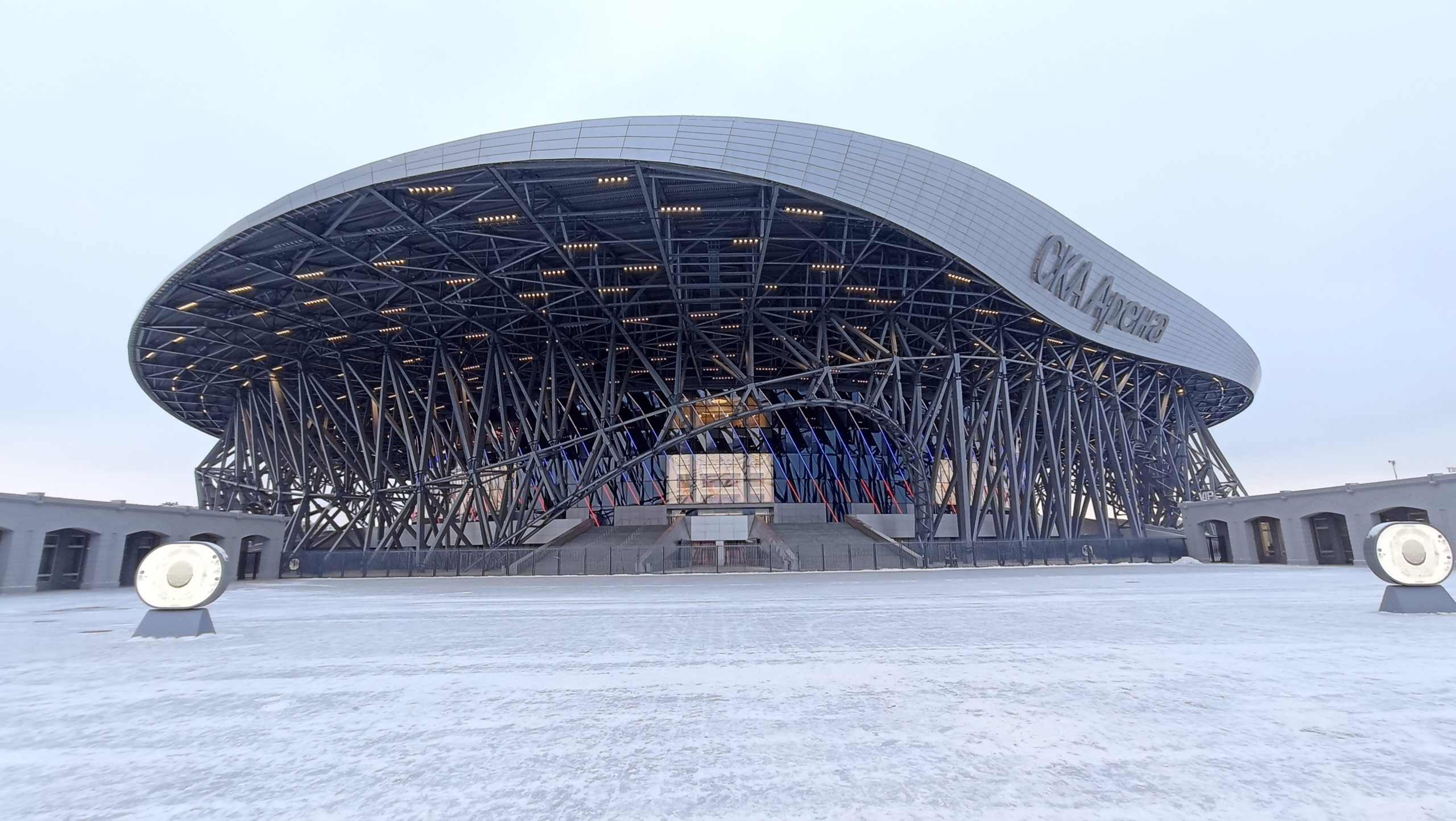
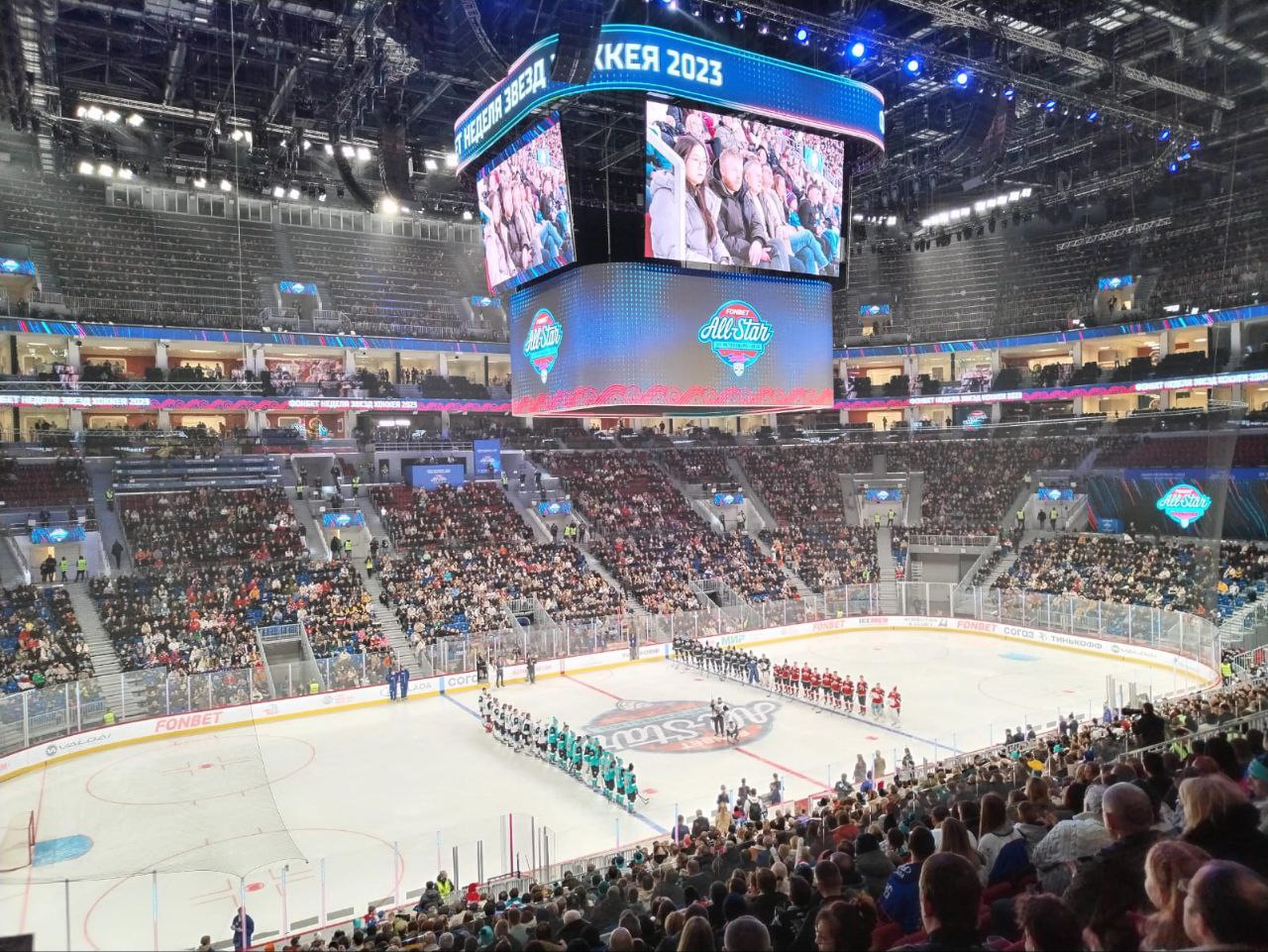
- Interactive map of SKA Arena
- Location: 8. Yu. Gagarina Av.; Saint Petersburg 196105; Russia
- Coordinates: 59°52′09″N 30°20′31″E
- Owner: Concession between the Government of St. Petersburg and SKA Arena LLC
- Operator: SKA Arena LLC
- Capacity: Ice hockey: 22,500
- Field size: 60×26 m
- Acreage: 189.5 thousand sq.m

Construction
- Groundbreaking: 2020
- Built: 2020–2023
- Opened: 9 December 2023; 2 years ago
- Cost: ₽ 60 billion (€ 645.9 million in 2023)
- Architects: Wolf Dieter Prix (Coop Himmelb(l)au) & Partner
- General contractor: GC Gorka

Tenants
- SKA St. Petersburg (KHL) (2024–present); Shanghai Dragons (KHL) (2025–present)

Website
- www.skaarena.ru

SKA Arena (Russian: СКА Арена) is a multi-purpose indoor arena in Saint Petersburg, Russia. Opened in 2023, it is the home arena of SKA Saint Petersburg and the Shanghai Dragons (since 2025) of the Kontinental Hockey League. With a seating capacity of 22,500 (originally 21,542) for ice hockey games, it is the largest hockey arena in the world, a title that used to be held by the Bell Centre in Montreal, Canada.

The arena was originally planned to host the main games of 2023 IIHF World Championship, but, in April 2022, the IIHF stripped Russia's hosting rights while the International Olympic Committee called for Russia and Belarus to be stripped of hosting rights to all international sporting events due to the Russian invasion of Ukraine.

== History ==
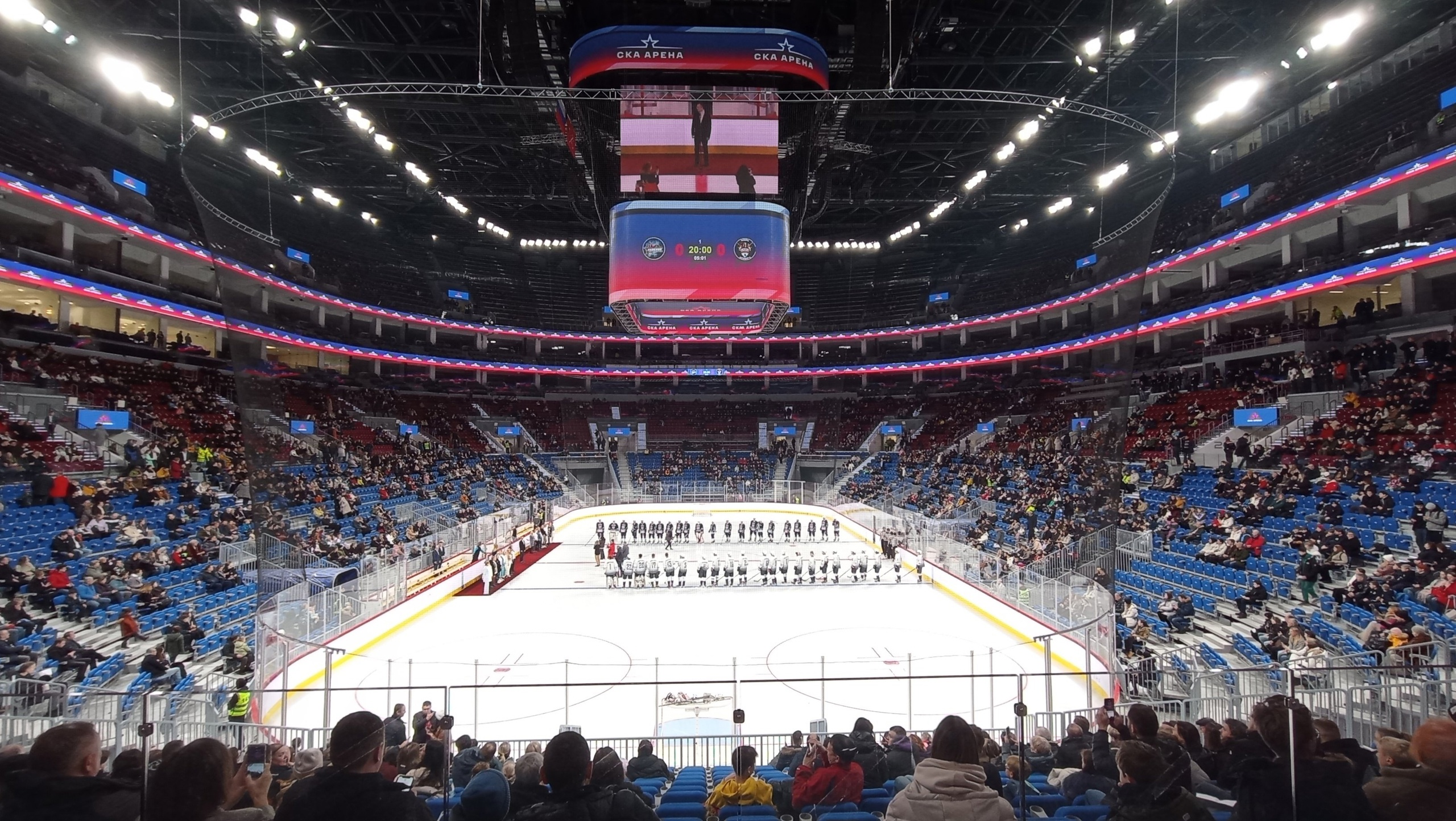
SKA Arena

In 2017, proposals were made to turn the Saint Petersburg Sports and Concert Complex into a new arena for the SKA St. Petersburg hockey team. During the discussions at the St. Petersburg Urban Planning Council between 2018 and 2019, two concepts of the reconstruction of the SCC were discussed: capital reconstruction with the preservation of the appearance of the building or the complete demolition of the building with the construction of a new ice arena in its place. As a result, it was decided to build a new ice arena on the site of the SCC, which should become the largest in the world. At the same time, it is indicated that the dimensions of the new complex should be larger than that of the previous complex, otherwise it will be impossible to place an arena with a capacity of more than 20 thousand people that meets modern requirements. It is also planned to build adjacent territory with social infrastructure and residential buildings.

On September 18, 2019, a tender for the first stage of the reconstruction of the complex was announced. On October 24, 2019, documents for the liquidation of the State Unitary Enterprise Petersburgersburg were signed, a representative of Gazprom as appointed chairman of the liquidation commission, and the installation of the fence for survey work on the ground began. On October 30, 2019, the contractor organization "SKA-Arena", which conducts these works, began to dismantle the seating bowl and hinged metal structures, light and sound equipment. During demolition on January 31, 2020, the roof and a large portion of the walls collapsed during the process of dismantling, resulting in the death of one worker. In the spring of 2020, the demolition of the St. Petersburg SCC was completed, and in June, the area was cleared of construction debris. In July, SKA Arena received permission to start construction work on the reconstruction of the outskirts of the arena, which are planned to be turned into sports grounds. In the same month, constructuion began to prepare the pile field of the arena.

In April 2021, the State Construction Supervision of St. Petersburg issued a permit for the construction of a new ice arena. The winner of the closed international architectural competition to choose the concept of the facade of the new sports complex was the Austrian architectural bureau Coop Himmelb(l)au, which proposed to base the architectural image of the arena of the Monument to the Third International, posters of El Lissitzky, the dynamics of sport and the trajectory of figure skating of Russia's first Olympic champion, Nikolai Panin. In May 2023, the press service reported that the arena is ready for "almost 90%" and its opening is scheduled for September of the same year and for the beginning of the 2023-24 KHL season. On December 9, 2023, the arena opened to the general public for the first time to host the skills competition as part of the 2023 KHL All Star Game festivities. On January 28, 2024, Russian president Vladimir Putin and Belarusian president Alexander Lukashenko visited the arena as a part of Lukashenko's diplomatic visit to Russia. On February 11, 2024, SKA St. Petersburg played their first game at the new arena, defeating HC Sochi 8–1, with Sergey Tolchinsky scoring the arena's first goal 43 seconds into the game.

Before the 2024 KHL playoffs, the capacity of the arena was extended to 22,500 seats.

On June 9, 2024 the arena was damaged in a fire, as a result of which SKA had to return to the Ice Palace for the start of the 2024/25 KHL season. It was reopened to host the 2024 Channel One Cup on December 12-15, 2024, and on December 17, 2024 SKA played their first game of the season at the arena, a 2-3 defeat against Lokomotiv Yaroslavl.

In the 2024-25 KHL season, SKA drew the highest average home attendance with 17,641.

== See also ==
- List of European ice hockey arenas
- List of ice hockey arenas by capacity
- List of indoor arenas by capacity
- List of indoor arenas in Russia
