= List of ice hockey arenas by capacity =

The following is a list of ice hockey arenas by capacity. Only those arenas that currently regularly host ice hockey games with paid admission (e.g. professional, major junior, or university) are included. Outdoor stadiums that have hosted occasional hockey games are not included. Buildings under construction are not included. Buildings are ranked by their current maximum capacity for hockey games, not for other events—which is often substantially different because of ice hockey's unique playing surface, the ice rink. Capacities do not include standing room tickets. All arenas with a capacity of 15,000 or more are included. Arenas with an * are current NHL arenas.

== Arenas by capacity ==
Rank	Arena	Capacity (Seating capacity only)	City	Country	Home team(s) (League, Dates)	Image
1	SKA Arena	22,500	Saint Petersburg	Russia	SKA St. Petersburg (KHL) (2023-present), Shanghai Dragons (KHL) (2025–present)	
2	First Horizon Coliseum	21,273	Greensboro	United States	Greensboro Generals (EHL/SHL) (1959–1975), Greensboro Monarchs (ECHL) (1989–1995), Carolina Monarchs (AHL) (1995–1997); Carolina Hurricanes (NHL) (1997–1999); Greensboro Generals (ECHL) (1999–2004), Greensboro Gargoyles (ECHL) (2025–present)	
3	Bell Centre*	20,962	Montreal	Canada	Montreal Canadiens (NHL) (1996–present)	
4	United Center*	19,717	Chicago	United States	Chicago Blackhawks (NHL) (1995–present)	
5	Xfinity Mobile Arena*	19,537	Philadelphia	United States	Philadelphia Flyers (NHL) (1996–present)	
6	Little Caesars Arena*	19,515	Detroit	United States	Detroit Red Wings (NHL) (2017–present)	
7	Scotiabank Saddledome*	19,289	Calgary	Canada	Calgary Flames (NHL) (1983–present), Calgary Hitmen (WHL) (1995–present), Calgary Wranglers (AHL) (2022–present)	
8	Amerant Bank Arena*	19,250	Sunrise	United States	Florida Panthers (NHL) (1998–present)	
9	Benchmark International Arena*	19,092	Tampa	United States	Tampa Bay Lightning (NHL) (1996–present)	
10	KeyBank Center*	19,070	Buffalo	United States	Buffalo Sabres (NHL) (1996–present)	
11	Rocket Arena	18,924	Cleveland	United States	Cleveland Monsters (AHL) (2007–present)	
12	Rogers Arena*	18,910	Vancouver	Canada	Vancouver Canucks (NHL) (1995–present)	
13	Scotiabank Arena*	18,800	Toronto	Canada	Toronto Maple Leafs (NHL) (1999–present)	
14	Lenovo Center*	18,700	Raleigh	United States	Carolina Hurricanes (NHL) (1999–present)	
15	Canadian Tire Centre*	18,655	Ottawa	Canada	Ottawa Senators (NHL) (1996–present)	
16	Rogers Place*	18,641	Edmonton	Canada	Edmonton Oilers (NHL) (2016–present), Edmonton Oil Kings (WHL) (2016–present)	
17	Capital One Arena*	18,573	Washington	United States	Washington Capitals (NHL) (1997–present)	
18	American Airlines Center*	18,532	Dallas	United States	Dallas Stars (NHL) (2001–present)	
19	Lanxess Arena	18,500	Cologne	Germany	Kölner Haie (DEL) (1998–present)	
20	PPG Paints Arena*	18,387	Pittsburgh	United States	Pittsburgh Penguins (NHL) (2010–present)	
21	Videotron Centre	18,259	Quebec City	Canada	Quebec Remparts (QMJHL) (2015–present)	
22	Crypto.com Arena*	18,230	Los Angeles	United States	Los Angeles Kings (NHL) (1999–present)	
23	Nationwide Arena*	18,144	Columbus	United States	Columbus Blue Jackets (NHL) (2000–present)	
24	Enterprise Center*	18,096	St. Louis	United States	St. Louis Blues (NHL) (1994–present)	
25	Grand Casino Arena*	18,064	St. Paul	United States	Minnesota Wild (NHL) (2000–present), Minnesota Frost (PWHL) (2024–present)	
26	Ball Arena*	18,007	Denver	United States	Colorado Avalanche (NHL) (1999–present)	
27	Madison Square Garden*	18,006	New York City	United States	New York Rangers (NHL) (1968–present)	
28	TD Garden*	17,565	Boston	United States	Boston Bruins (NHL) (1995–present)	
29	SAP Center at San Jose*	17,562	San Jose	United States	San Jose Sharks (NHL) (1993–present), San Jose Sea Lions (2026-present), San Jose Barracuda (AHL) (2015–2022)	
30	Value City Arena	17,500	Columbus	United States	Ohio State Buckeyes men's ice hockey (NCAA) (1998–present)	
31	T-Mobile Arena*	17,500	Las Vegas	United States	Vegas Golden Knights (NHL) (2017–present)	
32	TD Coliseum	17,383	Hamilton	Canada	Hamilton Hammers (2026–present), Hamilton Havoc (2026–present), Hamilton Bulldogs (OHL) (2015–2023), Hamilton Bulldogs (AHL) (1996-2015), Hamilton Steelhawks (OHL) 1985–1988, Dukes of Hamilton (OHL) 1989–1991, Hamilton Canucks (AHL) 1992–1994	
33	O2 Arena	17,413	Prague	Czech Republic	HC Sparta Praha (Czech Extraliga) (2015–present), HC Slavia Praha (Czech Extraliga, 2004–2015), HC LEV Praha (KHL, 2012–2014)	
34	UBS Arena*	17,255	Hempstead	United States	New York Islanders (NHL) (2021–present)	
35	Honda Center*	17,174	Anaheim	United States	Anaheim Ducks (NHL) (1993–present)	
36	Bridgestone Arena*	17,159	Nashville	United States	Nashville Predators (NHL) (1998–present)	
37	Climate Pledge Arena*	17,151	Seattle	United States	Seattle Kraken (NHL) (2021–present), Seattle Thunderbirds (WHL) (1989–2008), Seattle Torrent (PWHL) (2025–present)	
38	BOK Center	17,096	Tulsa	United States	Tulsa Oilers (ECHL) (2008–present)	
39	AO Arena	16,800	Manchester	England	Manchester Storm (2015) (EIHL) (2026–present)	
40	Allstate Arena	16,692	Rosemont	United States	Chicago Wolves (AHL) (1994–present)	
41	Prudential Center*	16,514	Newark	United States	New Jersey Devils (NHL) (2007–present), New York Sirens (PWHL) (2024–present)	
42	Pacific Coliseum	16,281	Vancouver	Canada	Vancouver Goldeneyes (PWHL) (2025–present)	
43	PeoplesBank Arena	15,564	Hartford	United States	New England Whalers (WHA) (1975–1978), Hartford Whalers (NHL) (1980–1997), Hartford Wolf Pack (AHL) (1997–present), Connecticut Huskies (NCAA) (2014–present)	
44	Casey's Center	15,581	Des Moines	United States	Iowa Stars (AHL) (2005–2009), Iowa Chops (AHL) (2005–2009), Iowa Wild (AHL) (2013–present)	
45	Canada Life Centre*	15,294	Winnipeg	Canada	Winnipeg Jets (NHL) (2011–present), Manitoba Moose (AHL) (2004–2011, 2015–present)	
46	Kohl Center	15,237	Madison	United States	Wisconsin Badgers men's ice hockey (NCAA) (1998–present)	
47	SaskTel Centre	15,195	Saskatoon	Canada	Saskatoon Blades (WHL) (1988–present)	
48	Minsk-Arena	15,086	Minsk	Belarus	Dinamo Minsk (KHL) (2008–present)	

== See also ==
- Lists of stadiums
- Ice hockey arena
- List of basketball arenas by capacity
- List of European ice hockey arenas
- List of indoor arenas in Canada
- List of National Hockey League arenas
