= SKA Saint Petersburg =

Ice hockey team based in Saint Petersburg, Russia

- City: Saint Petersburg, Russia
- League: KHL
- Conference: Western
- Division: Bobrov
- Founded: 1946
- Home arena: SKA Arena (capacity: 22,500)
- Colours: Red, blue
- Owner: Gazprom Export
- President: Gennady Timchenko
- General manager: Dmitry Konstantinov
- Head coach: Igor Larionov
- Captain: Sergei Plotnikov
- Affiliates: SKA-VMF (VHL); SKA-1946 (MHL); Akademiya SKA St. Petersburg (MHL)
- Website: ska.ru
Home colours	Away colours

Franchise history
- Kirov LDO; 1946–1953; ODO Leningrad; 1953–1957; SKVO Leningrad; 1957–1959; SKA Leningrad; 1959–1991; SKA Saint Petersburg; 1991–present

Hockey Club SKA (Russian: Хоккейный клуб СКА), often referred to as SKA Saint Petersburg and literally as the Sports Club of the Army, is a professional ice hockey club based in Saint Petersburg, Russia. It is a member of the Bobrov Division in the Kontinental Hockey League (KHL). The club never competed in a league final until the 2014–15 KHL season, where they defeated Ak Bars Kazan winning the Gagarin Cup. They won their second Gagarin Cup in 2017, defeating Metallurg Magnitogorsk. In 2012, with an average of 10,126 spectators, the SKA became the first Russian club ever to average a five-digit attendance.

SKA is owned by Russian state-controlled energy giant Gazprom. The club used its immense wealth to gather almost all elite Russian KHL players under its umbrella to prepare them for the 2018 Winter Olympics. The success of Russian team in winning gold at the first Olympics since 1994 that did not feature any active NHL players were attributed to players' chemistry developed in SKA.

== History ==
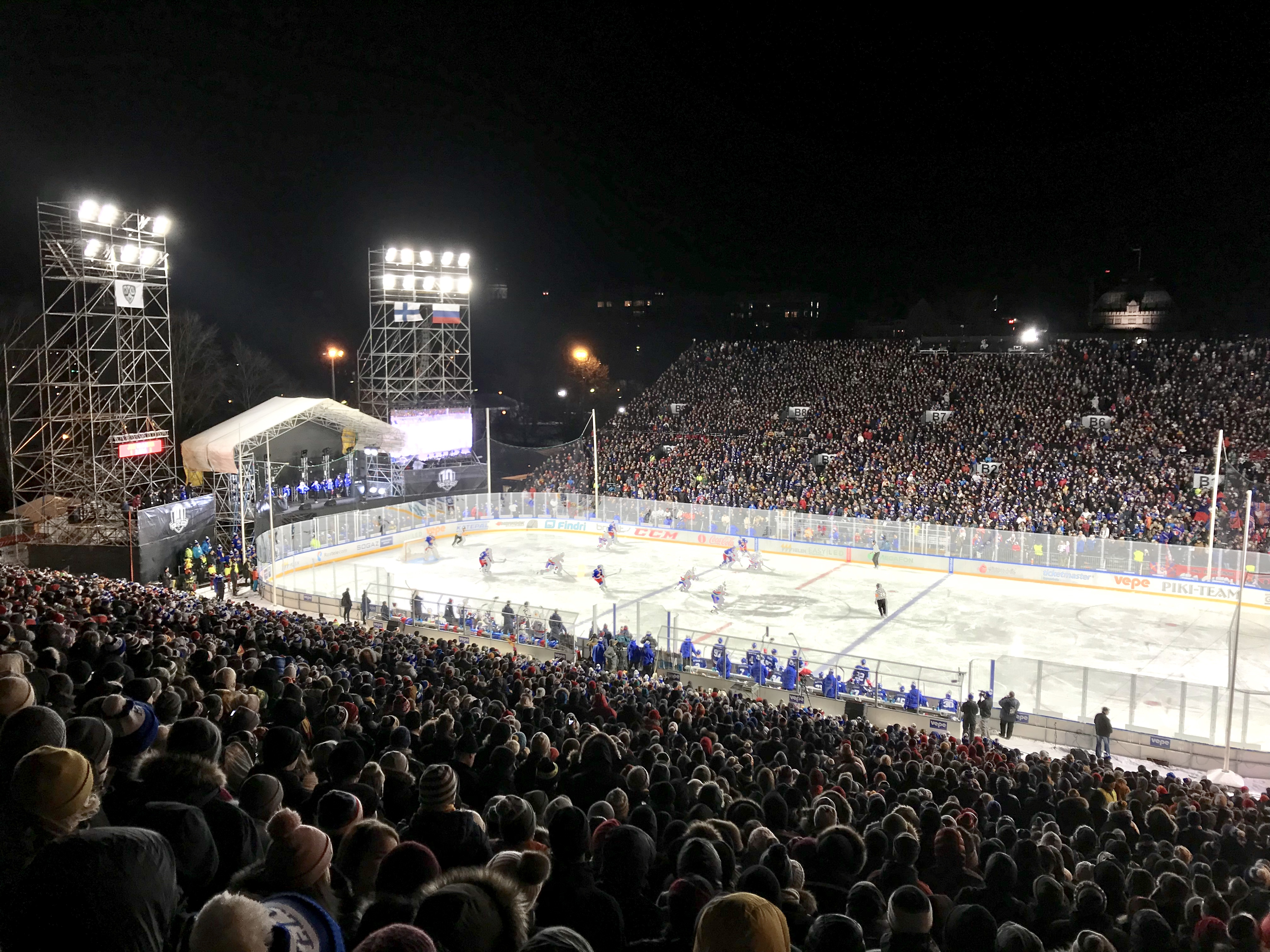
Helsinki Ice Challenge 2017.

The club was established in 1946 as a top-level club of the Soviet Championship League to participate in its first season. The original name of the club was Kirov LDO (Kirov Leningrad Officers' Club). It was subsequently changed to ODO (District Officers' Club) in 1953, SKVO (Sports Club of the Military District) in 1957 and finally Sportivnyi Klub Armii (Sport Club of the Army) in 1959. During the Soviet era, the SKA (along with CSKA Moscow) belonged to the Ministry of Defense sports club system.

After finishing last in their group during the first season, LDO skipped the next season and was downgraded to the second level of the championship in 1948. The club returned to the Soviet Class A in 1950–51 and remained in the top division of the Soviet league until 1991. The highest achievements of the club during that time were the 1968 and 1971 Soviet Cup Finals (the former was lost to CSKA Moscow 7–1, the latter to Spartak Moscow 5–1) as well as the bronze medals of the 1970–71 and 1986–87 Soviet Championships.

After one season in the second level division of the Soviet League (the first and the only CIS Championship), the SKA joined the International Ice Hockey League established by the top ice hockey teams of the former Soviet Union. During its 1993–94 season, the SKA managed to advance to the IHL Cup semi-finals but lost to that year's champion Lada Togliatti. The club was less successful in the Russian Superleague, which replaced the IHL as the main Russian championship since 1996, failing to get further than the first playoff rounds.

The formation of the Kontinental Hockey League in 2008 marked the beginning of a new era for the team. HC SKA got into their first Conference finals during the 2011–12 season and finishing first during the regular season the next year winning the 2012–13 Continental Cup.

In the 2015 Gagarin Cup playoffs, after defeating both Torpedo Nizhny Novgorod and Dynamo Moscow in five games in the first two rounds, HC SKA were in the Western Conference finals for the third time in four years this time facing CSKA Moscow. HC SKA were already down 0–3 after the first three games, but managed to rebound and win the next four straight clinching the series 4–3. This made them the first team in KHL history to win a playoff series after being down three games to none. The team would go on to defeat Ak Bars Kazan 4–1 to win the Gagarin Cup and become the KHL champions, the first nationwide championship in club history. But they could not manage to retain the Gagarin Cup in the following season, as they were swept by 2015–16 Continental Cup winners CSKA Moscow in the conference finals and finished in 3rd place.

In the 2016–17 KHL season, SKA drew an average home attendance of 11,735.

SKA has a major rivalry against HC CSKA Moscow, referred to as the Army Derby.

== Awards and trophies ==
=== Team ===
Gagarin Cup

- Winners (2): 2014–15, 2016–17

Continental Cup

- Winners (3): 2012–13, 2017–18, 2022–23

Opening Cup

- Winners (2): 2017–18, 2018–19

Soviet Championship League

- 3rd place (2): 1970–71, 1986–87

=== Pre-season ===
Spengler Cup

- Winners (4): 1970, 1971, 1977, 2010

Motorola Cup

- Winners (1): 1983

Puchkov Cup

- Winners (6): 2008,2015,2017,2018,2019,2021,2022

Basel Summer Ice Hockey

- Winners (1): 2009

Donbass Open Cup

- Winners (1): 2011

President of the Republic of Kazakhstan's Cup

- Winners (1): 2012

Tournament Hameenlinna

- Winners (1): 2013

Sochi Winter Cup

- Winners (1): 2022

== Season-by-season record ==
Note: GP = Games played, W = Wins, L = Losses, OTW = Overtime/shootout wins, OTL = Overtime/shootout losses, Pts = Points, GF = Goals for, GA = Goals against

Season	GP	W	OTW	L	OTL	Pts	GF	GA	Finish	Top scorer	Playoffs
2008–09	56	26	9	17	4	100	143	105	3rd, Tarasov	Maxim Sushinsky (45 points: 18 G, 27 A; 48 GP)	Lost in preliminary round, 0–3 (Spartak Moscow)
2009–10	56	36	4	10	6	122	192	118	1st, Bobrov	Maxim Sushinsky (65 points: 27 G, 38 A; 56 GP)	Lost in Conference quarterfinals, 1–3 (Dinamo Riga)
2010–11	54	23	9	13	9	96	171	144	2nd, Bobrov	Mattias Weinhandl (49 points: 21 G, 28 A; 54 GP)	Lost in Conference semifinals, 3–4 (Atlant Moscow Oblast)
2011–12	54	32	6	11	5	113	205	130	1st, Bobrov	Tony Mårtensson (61 points: 23 G, 38 A; 54 GP)	Lost in Conference finals, 0–4 (Dynamo Moscow)
2012–13	52	36	2	11	3	115	182	116	1st, Bobrov	Patrick Thoresen (51 points: 21 G, 30 A; 52 GP)	Lost in Conference finals, 2–4 (Dynamo Moscow)
2013–14	53	33	1	13	4	105	174	113	2nd, Bobrov	Artemi Panarin (40 points: 20 G, 20 A; 51 GP)	Lost in Conference semifinals, 2–4 (Lokomotiv Yaroslavl)
2014–15	60	36	2	14	2	123	210	136	2nd, Bobrov	Artemi Panarin (62 points: 26 G, 36 A; 54 GP)	Gagarin Cup Champions, 4–1 (Ak Bars Kazan)
2015–16	60	29	2	21	2	100	163	197	2nd, Bobrov	Vadim Shipachyov (60 points: 17 G, 43 A; 54 GP)	Lost in Conference finals, 0–4 (CSKA Moscow)
2016–17	60	39	7	8	8	137	249	114	1st, Bobrov	Ilya Kovalchuk (78 points: 32 G, 46 A; 60 GP)	Gagarin Cup Champions, 4–1 (Metallurg Magnitogorsk)
2017–18	56	40	3	9	2	138	227	97	1st, Bobrov	Ilya Kovalchuk (64 points: 17 G, 43 A; 54 GP)	Lost in Conference finals, 2–4 (CSKA Moscow)
2018–19	62	45	4	5	8	103	209	80	1st, Bobrov	Nikita Gusev (82 points: 17 G, 65 A; 62 GP)	Lost in Conference finals, 3–4 (CSKA Moscow)
2019–20	62	30	14	13	5	93	179	118	1st, Bobrov	Vladimir Tkachev (42 points: 14 G, 28 A; 55 GP)	Won in Conference quarterfinals, 4–0 (HC Vityaz); Playoffs cancelled due to COVID-19
2020–21	60	33	4	8	15	82	178	126	1st, Bobrov	Vladimir Tkachev (38 points: 11 G, 27 A; 45 GP)	Lost in Conference finals, 2–4 (CSKA Moscow)
2021–22	48	25	6	11	6	68	146	98	1st, Bobrov	Andrei Kuzmenko (53 points: 20 G, 33 A; 45 GP)	Lost in Conference finals, 3–4 (CSKA Moscow)
2022–23	68	40	10	5	13	105	243	150	1st, Bobrov	Dmitrij Jaškin (62 points: 40 G, 22 A; 67 GP)	Lost in Conference finals, 2–4 (CSKA Moscow)
2023–24	68	40	6	19	3	95	220	139	1st, Bobrov	Alexander Nikishin (56 points: 17 G, 39 A; 67 GP)	Lost in Quarterfinals, 1–4 (Avtomobilist Yekaterinburg)
2024–25	68	28	10	24	6	82	236	205	2nd, Bobrov	Ivan Demidov (49 points: 19 G, 30 A; 65 GP)	Lost in Last 16, 2–4 (Dynamo Moscow)
2025–26	68	28	9	24	7	81	197	170	1st, Bobrov	Marat Khairullin (49 points: 19 G, 30 A; 67 GP)	Lost in Last 16, 1–4 (CSKA Moscow)

== Players ==
=== Current roster ===
Updated 29 August 2026.

No.	Nat	Player	Pos	S/G	Age	Acquired	Birthplace
–	(Russia)	Danil Aimurzin	F	R	24	2026	Ufa, Russia
–	(Russia)	Vasily Atanasov	RW	L	23	2026	Nizhny Tagil, Russia
70	(Russia)	Zakhar Bardakov	C	L	25	2026	Seversk, Russia
–	(Russia)	Nikolai Chebykin	LW	L	29	2026	Chita, Russia
55	(Russia)	Nikita Dishkovsky	RW	L	23	2025	Kogalym, Russia
–	(Russia)	Vasili Glotov	C	L	29	2026	Barnaul, Russia
87	(Russia)	Nikolay Goldobin	RW	L	30	2025	Moscow, Russia
91	(United States)	Rocco Grimaldi	RW	R	33	2025	Rossmoor, California, United States
1	(Russia)	Sergei Ivanov	G	L	22	2022	Chernushka, Russia
72	(Russia)	Nikolai Knyzhov	D	L	28	2026	Kemerovo, Russia
71	(Russia)	Matvei Korotky	C	R	20	2024	Krasnoyarsk, Russia
69	(Russia)	Igor Larionov	C	L	28	2025	Detroit, Michigan, United States
91	(Russia)	Ignat Lutfullin	LW	R	21	2025	Bolshoy Kamen, Russia
–	(Russia)	Alexei Maklyukov	D	L	29	2026	Voskresensk, Russia
–	(Russia)	Daniil Miromanov	D	R	29	2026	Chita, Russia
8	(Canada)	Trevor Murphy	D	L	31	2025	Windsor, Ontario, Canada
68	(Russia)	Nikita Nedopyokin	C	L	21	2025	Buynaksk, Russia
97	(Russia)	Amir Nugmanov	LW	R	21	2023	Nizhnekamsk, Russia
3	(Russia)	Andrey Pedan	D	L	33	2022	Kaunas, Lithuania
73	(Russia)	Artemi Pleshkov	G	L	23	2023	Moscow, Russia
16	(Russia)	Sergei Plotnikov (C)	F	L	36	2024	Komsomolsk-on-Amur, Soviet Union
98	(Russia)	Vladislav Romanov	LW	R	22	2025	Megion, Russia
9	(Belarus)	Sergei Sapego	D	L	26	2023	Vitebsk, Belarus
34	(Russia)	Yegor Savikov	D	L	23	2025	Novokuibyshevsk, Russia
–	(Russia)	Vladislav Syomin	D	L	28	2026	Nizhny Tagil, Russia
–	(Russia)	Arseni Varlakov	D	L	23	2026	Miass, Russia
–	(Sweden)	Linus Weissbach	RW	L	28	2026	Gothenburg, Sweden
20	(Canada)	Scott Wilson	LW	L	34	2026	Oakville, Ontario, Canada
22	(Russia)	Nikita Zaitsev	D	R	34	2024	Moscow, Russian SFSR
90	(Russia)	Valentin Zykov	RW	R	31	2021	St. Petersburg, Russia

=== All-time KHL scoring leaders ===
These are the top-ten point-scorers in franchise history. Figures are updated after each completed KHL regular season.

Note: Pos = Position; GP = Games played; G = Goals; A = Assists; Pts = Points; P/G = Points per game; = current SKA player

Points
Player	Pos	GP	G	A	Pts	P/G
(Russia) Nikita Gusev	LW	274	109	225	334	1.22
(Russia) Ilya Kovalchuk	LW	298	138	189	327	1.10
(Russia) Vadim Shipachyov	C	227	76	171	247	1.09
(Russia) Sergei Plotnikov	LW	323	93	133	226	0.70
(Russia) Marat Khairullin	RW	232	82	106	188	0.81
(Sweden) Tony Mårtensson	C	260	71	117	188	0.72
(Norway) Patrick Thoresen	C	197	68	103	171	0.87
(Russia) Anton Burdasov	RW	272	83	76	159	0.58
(Russia) Evgenii Dadonov	RW	165	72	86	158	0.96
(Russia) Alexander Nikishin	D	193	45	112	157	0.81

Goals
Player	Pos	G
(Russia) Ilya Kovalchuk	LW	138
(Russia) Nikita Gusev	LW	109
(Russia) Sergei Plotnikov	LW	93
(Russia) Anton Burdasov	RW	83
(Russia) Marat Khairullin	RW	82
(Russia) Vadim Shipachyov	C	76
(Russia) Viktor Tikhonov	C	75
(Russia) Evgenii Dadonov	RW	72
(Sweden) Tony Mårtensson	C	71
(Norway) Patrick Thoresen	C	68

Assists
Player	Pos	A
(Russia) Nikita Gusev	LW	225
(Russia) Ilya Kovalchuk	LW	189
(Russia) Vadim Shipachyov	C	171
(Russia) Sergei Plotnikov	LW	133
(Sweden) Tony Mårtensson	C	117
(Russia) Alexander Nikishin	D	112
(Russia) Marat Khairullin	RW	106
(Russia) Mikhail Vorobyev	C	105
(Norway) Patrick Thoresen	C	103
(Russia) Andrei Kuzmenko	RW	90

== Head coaches ==
- (Soviet Union) Gennady Dmitriev (1946–47)
- (Soviet Union) A. Semenov (1950—1951)
- (Soviet Union) Belyay Bekyashev (1951—1952)
- (Soviet Union) Georgy Lasin (1952—1953)
- (Soviet Union) Anatoly Viktorov (1953—1956–57)
- (Soviet Union) Evgeny Voronin (1957—1958)
- (Soviet Union) Aleksander Komarov (1958—1962)
- (Soviet Union) Yevgeni Babich (1962–1963)
- (Soviet Union) Nikolai Puchkov (1963—1973)
- (Soviet Union) Veniamin Alexandrov (1973—1974)
- (Soviet Union) Nikolai Puchkov (1974—1977)
- (Soviet Union) Oleg Sivkov (1977–78)
- (Soviet Union) Nikolai Puchkov (1978)
- (Soviet Union) Valeri Shilov (1978—1979)
- (Soviet Union) Igor Romishevsky (1979—1981)
- (Soviet Union) Boris Mikhailov (1981—1984)
- (Soviet Union) Valeri Shilov (1984—1989)
- (Soviet Union) Gennadiy Tsygankov (1989–90—1990–91)
- (Soviet Union) / (Russia) Igor Shurkov (1990–91—1991–92)
- (Russia) Boris Mikhailov (1992–93—1998)
- (Russia) Nikolai Maslov (1998–99)
- (Russia) Alexander Zhukov (1999)
- (Russia) Rafael Ishmatov (1999—2001–02)
- (Russia) Nikolai Puchkov (2002)
- (Russia) Boris Mikhailov (2002—2005)
- (Russia) Nikolai Solovyev (2005–06)
- (Russia) Sergei Cherkas (2006)
- (Russia) Boris Mikhailov (2006)
- (Russia) Yuri Leonov (2006—2007)
- (United States) Barry Smith (2007—2010)
- (Canada) Ivan Zanatta (2010)
- (Czech Republic) Václav Sýkora (2010—11)
- (Czech Republic) Miloš Říha (2011—2012)
- (Russia) Mikhail Kravets (2012)
- (Finland) Jukka Jalonen (2012—2014)
- (Russia) Vyacheslav Bykov (2014—2015)
- (Russia) Andrei Nazarov (2015)
- (Russia) Sergei Zubov (2015–16)
- (Latvia) / (Germany) Oļegs Znaroks (2016—2018)
- (Russia) Ilya Vorobiev (2018—2019)
- (Russia) Alexei Kudashov (2019—2020)
- (Russia) Valeri Bragin (2020—2022)
- (Russia) Roman Rotenberg (2022—2025)
- (Russia) Igor Larionov (2025—)

== Logos ==
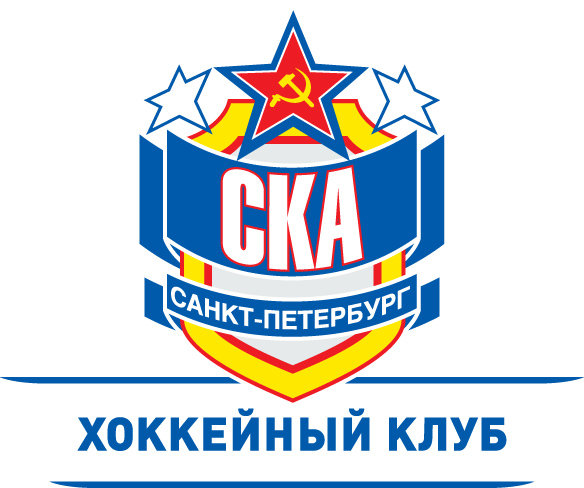
Logo during 2010

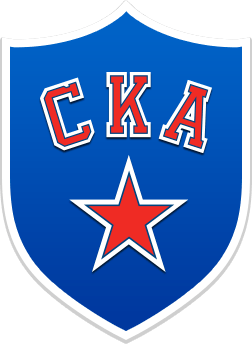
Former logo (2015)

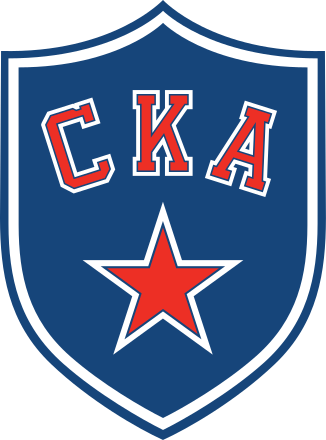
Former logo (2022)

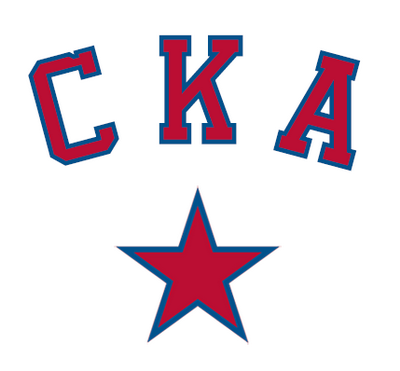
Former logo

Former logo
