= List of 1956 Winter Olympics medal winners =

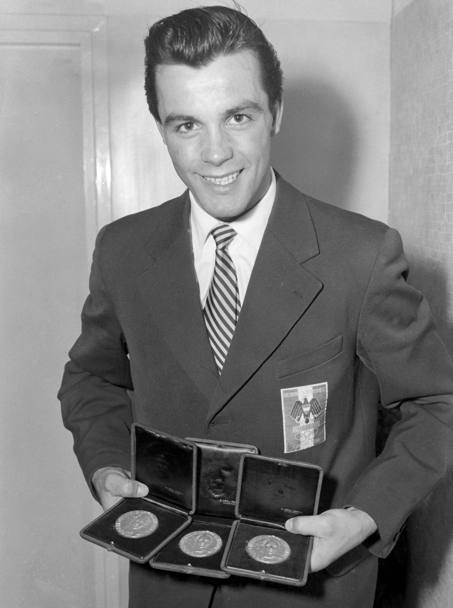
Toni Sailer, the Austrian gold medalist in three disciplines Alpine skiing

The 1956 Winter Olympics, officially known by the International Olympic Committee (IOC) as the VII Olympic Winter Games, were a winter multi-sport event held in Cortina d'Ampezzo, Italy, from 26 January to 5 February 1956. A total of 821 athletes representing 32 National Olympic Committees (NOCs) participated in these Games in 24 events across 8 disciplines. The Olympic program was similar to four years prior, with two new cross-country events added to the competition. Both men and women competed at these Games, though women only contested events in alpine skiing, figure skating, and cross-country skiing. The Soviet Union attempted to secure the inclusion of a women's speed skating event, but this was rejected by the IOC at its 49th session in Athens in 1954. Women would compete in speed skating four years later at the 1960 Squaw Valley Olympics.

A total of 131 athletes won medals in Cortina d'Ampezzo. In their Winter Olympic debut, athletes from the Soviet Union won sixteen medals, seven of which were gold. Both medal totals were the most of any NOC at the Games. Two of these seven medals were earned in a single event, the 1500 meters speed skating competition, when two Soviet skaters tied for first place in a world record time. Athletes from Austria and Sweden won the second and third most medals, with 11 and 10 respectively. Of the 32 NOCs that competed in Cortina d'Ampezzo, 13 won at least one medal. Host nation Italy won three medals, all in bobsleigh.

Cross-country skier Sixten Jernberg of Sweden won four medals, and Austrian Toni Sailer won three gold medals in alpine skiing, both of which were the most of any athlete in Cortina d'Ampezzo. Tenley Albright improved on her silver medal from four years prior in Oslo to win the gold medal in ladies figure skating. The Soviet Union won six medals—exactly half of the medals awarded—in speed skating, with two each being won by Yevgeny Grishin and Oleg Goncharenko. Grishin would repeat his performance with golds in the same two events four years later in Squaw Valley.

== Alpine skiing ==
Event	Gold	Silver	Bronze
Men's downhill	Toni Sailer; Austria	Raymond Fellay; Switzerland	Anderl Molterer; Austria
Men's giant slalom	Toni Sailer; Austria	Anderl Molterer; Austria	Walter Schuster; Austria
Men's slalom	Toni Sailer; Austria	Chiharu Igaya; Japan	Stig Sollander; Sweden
Women's downhill	Madeleine Berthod; Switzerland	Frieda Dänzer; Switzerland	Lucille Wheeler; Canada
Women's giant slalom	Ossi Reichert; United Team of Germany	Putzi Frandl; Austria	Thea Hochleitner; Austria
Women's slalom	Renée Colliard; Switzerland	Regina Schöpf; Austria	Yevgeniya Sidorova; Soviet Union

== Bobsleigh ==
Event	Gold	Silver	Bronze
Men's two-man	Italy; Italy I Lamberto Dalla Costa; Giacomo Conti	Italy; Italy II; Eugenio Monti; Renzo Alverà	Switzerland; Switzerland I Max Angst; Harry Warburton
Men's four-man	Switzerland; Switzerland I Franz Kapus; Gottfried Diener; Robert Alt; Heinrich Angst	Italy; Italy II; Eugenio Monti; Ulrico Girardi; Renzo Alverà; Renato Mocellini	United States; USA I Arthur Tyler; William Dodge; Charles Butler; James Lamy

== Cross-country skiing ==
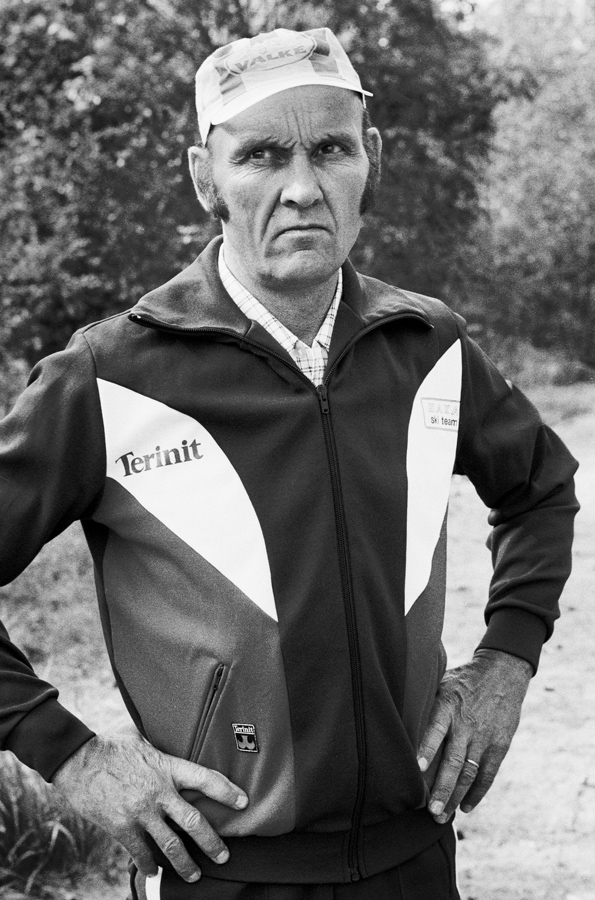
Veikko Hakulinen won one gold and two silver medals in the 1956 Winter Olympics.

Event	Gold	Silver	Bronze
Men's 15 km	Hallgeir Brenden; Norway	Sixten Jernberg; Sweden	Pavel Kolchin; Soviet Union
Men's 30 km	Veikko Hakulinen; Finland	Sixten Jernberg; Sweden	Pavel Kolchin; Soviet Union
Men's 50 km	Sixten Jernberg; Sweden	Veikko Hakulinen; Finland	Fyodor Terentyev; Soviet Union
Men's 4×10 km	Soviet Union; Fyodor Terentyev; Pavel Kolchin; Nikolay Anikin; Vladimir Kuzin	Finland; August Kiuru; Jorma Kortelainen; Arvo Viitanen; Veikko Hakulinen	Sweden; Lennart Larsson; Gunnar Samuelsson; Per-Erik Larsson; Sixten Jernberg
Women's 10 km	Lyubov Kozyreva; Soviet Union	Radya Yeroshina; Soviet Union	Sonja Edström; Sweden
Women's 3×5 km	Finland; Sirkka Polkunen; Mirja Hietamies; Siiri Rantanen	Soviet Union; Lyubov Kozyreva; Alevtina Kolchina; Radya Yeroshina	Sweden; Irma Johansson; Anna-Lisa Eriksson; Sonja Edström

== Figure skating ==
Event	Gold	Silver	Bronze
Men's	Hayes Alan Jenkins; United States	Ronnie Robertson; United States	David Jenkins; United States
Ladies'	Tenley Albright; United States	Carol Heiss; United States	Ingrid Wendl; Austria
Pairs	Austria; Sissy Schwarz; Kurt Oppelt	Canada; Frances Dafoe; Norris Bowden	Hungary; Marianna Nagy; László Nagy

== Ice hockey ==
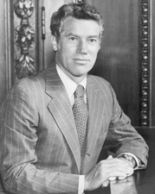
Wendell Anderson, silver medalist for the United States in ice hockey, would be elected Governor of Minnesota in 1971.

Event	Gold	Silver	Bronze
Men's team	Soviet Union; Yevgeny Babich; Vsevolod Bobrov; Alexei Guryshev; Nikolay Khlystov; Valentin Kuzin; Yuri Krylov; Alfred Kuchevsky; Grigory Mkrtychan; Viktor Nikiforov; Yuri Pantyukhov; Nikolaï Puchkov; Viktor Shuvalov; Genrikh Sidorenkov; Nikolai Sologubov; Ivan Tregubov; Dmitry Ukolov; Aleksandr Uvarov	United States; Wendell Anderson; Wellington Burtnett; Eugene Campbell; Gordon Christian; Bill Cleary; Richard Dougherty; Willard Ikola; John Matchefts; John Mayasich; Daniel McKinnon; Richard Meredith; Weldon Olson; John Petroske; Kenneth Purpur; Don Rigazio; Richard Rodenheiser; Ed Sampson	Canada; Denis Brodeur; Charles Brooker; William Colvin; Alfred Horne; Art Hurst; Byrle Klinck; Paul Knox; Ken Laufman; Howard Lee; James Logan; Floyd Martin; Jack McKenzie; Donald Rope; George Scholes; Gerry Theberge; Robert White; Keith Woodall

== Nordic combined ==
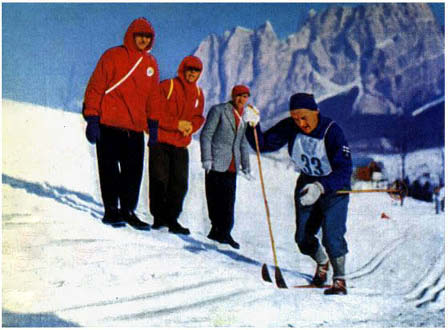
Sverre Stenersen, the 1952 bronze medalist in Nordic combined, won gold in Cortina d'Ampezzo.

Event	Gold	Silver	Bronze
Men's individual	Sverre Stenersen; Norway	Bengt Eriksson; Sweden	Franciszek Gąsienica Groń; Poland

== Ski jumping ==
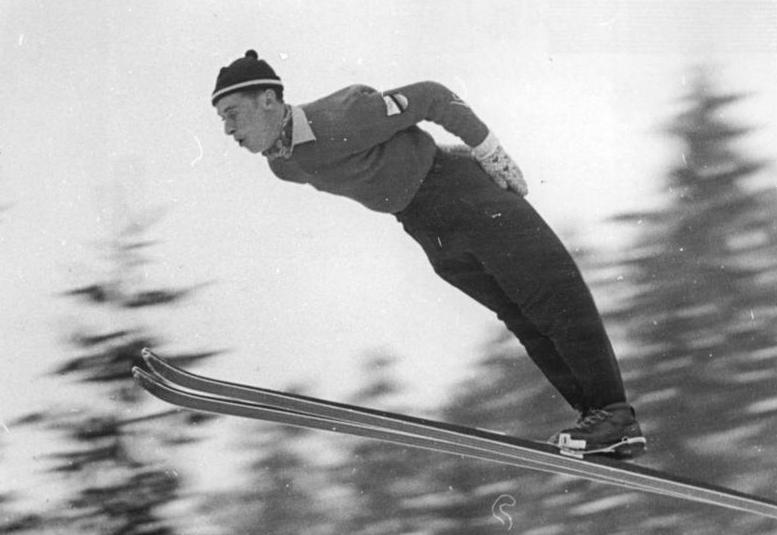
Ski jumping bronze medalist Harry Glaß of the Unified Team of Germany, pictured here in Oberhof, East Germany shortly after the 1956 Olympics

Event	Gold	Silver	Bronze
Men's individual	Antti Hyvärinen; Finland	Aulis Kallakorpi; Finland	Harry Glaß; United Team of Germany

== Speed skating ==
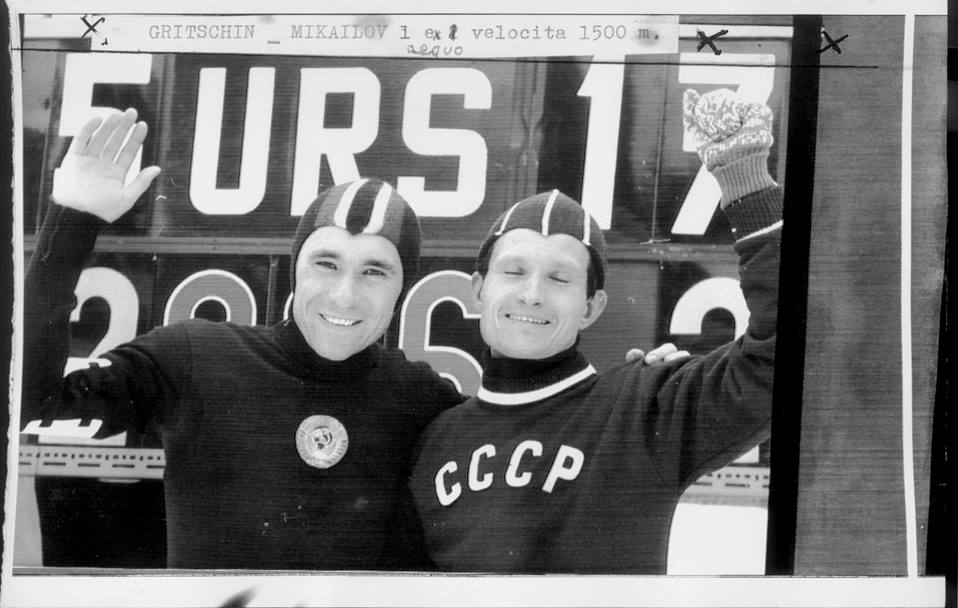
Yevgeny Grishin and Yuri Mikhaylov tied for first place in the 1,500 metres speed skating with a world record.

Event	Gold	Silver	Bronze
Men's 500 metres	Yevgeny Grishin; Soviet Union	Rafayel Grach; Soviet Union	Alv Gjestvang; Norway
Men's 1500 metres	Yevgeny Grishin; Soviet Union	None awarded^{[a]}	Toivo Salonen; Finland
Men's 1500 metres	Yuri Mikhaylov; Soviet Union	None awarded^{[a]}	Toivo Salonen; Finland
Men's 5000 metres	Boris Shilkov; Soviet Union	Sigvard Ericsson; Sweden	Oleg Goncharenko; Soviet Union
Men's 10000 metres	Sigvard Ericsson; Sweden	Knut Johannesen; Norway	Oleg Goncharenko; Soviet Union

== Multiple medalists ==
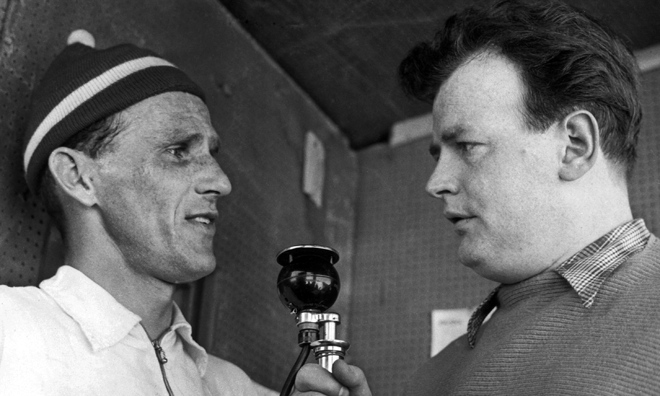
Sixten Jernberg (left), who represented Sweden in cross-country skiing, won four medals including a gold medal in the 50 km race.

Athletes who won multiple medals during the 1956 Winter Olympics are listed below.

Athlete	Nation	Sport	Gold	Silver	Bronze	Total
Sixten Jernberg	Sweden	Cross-country skiing	1	2	1	4
Toni Sailer	Austria	Alpine skiing	3	0	0	3
Veikko Hakulinen	Finland	Cross-country skiing	1	2	0	3
Pavel Kolchin	Soviet Union	Cross-country skiing	1	0	2	3
Yevgeny Grishin	Soviet Union	Speed skating	2	0	0	2
Lyubov Kozyreva	Soviet Union	Cross-country skiing	1	1	0	2
Sigvard Ericsson	Sweden	Speed skating	1	1	0	2
Fyodor Terentyev	Soviet Union	Cross-country skiing	1	0	1	2
Renzo Alverà	Italy	Bobsleigh	0	2	0	2
Eugenio Monti	Italy	Bobsleigh	0	2	0	2
Radya Yeroshina	Soviet Union	Cross-country skiing	0	2	0	2
Anderl Molterer	Austria	Alpine skiing	0	1	1	2
Sonja Edström	Sweden	Cross-country skiing	0	0	2	2
Oleg Goncharenko	Soviet Union	Speed skating	0	0	2	2

== Note ==
- ^{a} No silver medal was awarded in this event because Grishin and Mikhaylov tied for first place with a world record time of 2:08.6.

== See also ==
- 1956 Winter Olympics medal table
