= Canada at the 1956 Winter Olympics =

- IOC code: CAN
- NOC: Canadian Olympic Committee
- Website: www.olympic.ca (in English and French)

in Cortina d'Ampezzo, Italy 26 January 1956 – 5 February 1956
- Competitors: 35 (27 men, 8 women) in 7 sports
- Flag bearer: Norris Bowden
- Medals Ranked 10th: Gold 0 Silver 1 Bronze 2 Total 3

Winter Olympics appearances (overview)
- 1924; 1928; 1932; 1936; 1948; 1952; 1956; 1960; 1964; 1968; 1972; 1976; 1980; 1984; 1988; 1992; 1994; 1998; 2002; 2006; 2010; 2014; 2018; 2022; 2026

Canada competed at the 1956 Winter Olympics in Cortina d'Ampezzo, Italy. Canada has competed at every Winter Olympic Games.

== Medalists ==
Medal	Name	Sport	Event
Silver	Frances Dafoe; Norris Bowden	Figure skating	Pairs
Bronze	Canada men's national ice hockey team (Kitchener-Waterloo Dutchmen): Denis Brodeur; Charles Brooker; William Colvin; Alfred Horne; Art Hurst; Byrle Klinck; Paul Knox; Kenneth Laufman; Howard Lee; James Logan; Floyd Martin; Jack McKenzie; Donald Rope; George Scholes; Gerry Theberge; Robert White; Keith Woodall	Ice hockey	Men's competition
Bronze	Lucile Wheeler	Alpine skiing	Women's downhill

== Alpine skiing ==
Men

Athlete	Event	Race 1		Race 2		Total	
Athlete	Event	Time	Rank	Time	Rank	Time	Rank
André Bertrand	Downhill					3:31.2	25
André Bertrand	Giant Slalom					3:33.1	39
André Bertrand	Slalom	2:42.8	57	2:20.0	30	5:02.8	50

Women

Athlete	Event	Race 1		Race 2		Total	
Athlete	Event	Time	Rank	Time	Rank	Time	Rank
Ginette Seguin	Downhill					1:58.2	33
Carlyn Kruger	Downhill					1:53.2	22
Anne Heggtveit	Downhill					1:53.2	22
Lucille Wheeler	Downhill					1:45.9	3rd place, bronze medalist(s)
Carlyn Kruger	Giant Slalom					DSQ	–
Ginette Seguin	Giant Slalom					2:16.6	36
Anne Heggtveit	Giant Slalom					2:05.3	29
Lucille Wheeler	Giant Slalom					1:58.6	6
Lucille Wheeler	Slalom	1:36.7	38	DSQ	–	DSQ	–
Anne Heggtveit	Slalom	1:31.0	34	1:07.5	20	2:38.5	30
Carlyn Kruger	Slalom	1:14.7	30	1:07.6	21	2:22.3	23
Ginette Seguin	Slalom	1:05.6	22	1:10.0	24	2:15.6	18

== Cross-country skiing ==
Men

Event	Athlete	Race	
Event	Athlete	Time	Rank
15 km	Clarence Servold	53:34	19
30 km	Clarence Servold	2'00:01	37
50 km	Clarence Servold	3'21:50	22

== Figure skating ==
Men

Athlete	CF	FS	Points	Places	Rank
Charles Snelling	9	7	150.42	67	8

Women

Athlete	CF	FS	Points	Places	Rank
Ann Johnston	7	10	152.56	94	9
Carole Jane Pachl	6	8	154.74	73	6

Pairs

Athletes	Points	Places	Rank
Barbara Wagner; Robert Paul	10.74	54.5	6
Frances Dafoe; Norris Bowden	11.32	16	2nd place, silver medalist(s)

== Ice hockey ==
Canada was represented by the Kitchener-Waterloo Dutchmen, which would later represent Canada at the 1960 Winter Olympics (silver medal). The Dutchmen are the only self-contained club team to represent Canada at two different Olympics.

=== Group A ===
Top two teams advanced to Medal Round.

Rank	Team	Pld	W	L	T	GF	GA	Pts
1	Canada	3	3	0	0	30	1	6
2	Germany	3	1	1	1	9	6	3
3	Italy	3	0	1	2	5	7	2
4	Austria	3	0	2	1	2	32	1

- Canada 4-0 Germany (UTG)
- Canada 23-0 Austria
- Italy 1-3 Canada

=== Games for 1st-6th places ===
Rank	Team	Pld	W	L	T	GF	GA	Pts
1	Soviet Union	5	5	0	0	25	5	10
2	United States	5	4	1	0	26	12	8
3rd place, bronze medalist(s)	Canada	5	3	2	0	23	11	6
4	Sweden	5	1	3	1	10	17	3
5	Czechoslovakia	5	1	4	0	20	30	2
6	Germany	5	0	4	1	6	35	1

- Canada 6-3 Czechoslovakia
- USA 4-1 Canada
- Canada 10-0 Germany (UTG)
- Canada 6-2 Sweden
- USSR 2-0 Canada

=== Leading scorers ===
Rk	Team	GP	G	A	Pts
1st	(Canada) James Logan	8	7	5	12
1st	(Canada) Paul Knox	8	7	5	12
3rd	(Canada) Gerry Theberge	8	9	2	11
5th	(Canada) Jack McKenzie	8	7	4	11
9th	(Canada) George Scholes	8	5	3	8

Bronze:
Canada

Denis Brodeur
Keith Woodall
Floyd Martin
Howie Lee
Art Hurst
Jack McKenzie
James Logan
Paul Knox
Donald Rope
Byrle Klinck
Bill Colvin
Gerry Théberge
Alfred Horne
Charlie Brooker
George Scholes
Bob White
Ken Laufman

== Nordic combined ==
Events:

- normal hill ski jumping (Three jumps, best two counted and shown here.)
- 15 km cross-country skiing

Athlete	Event	Ski Jumping				Cross-country			Total	
Athlete	Event	Distance 1	Distance 2	Points	Rank	Time	Points	Rank	Points	Rank
Irvin Servold	Individual	64.0	64.5	180.0	31	1'01:44	219.000	24	399.000	27

== Ski jumping ==
Athlete	Event	Jump 1			Jump 2			Total	
Athlete	Event	Distance	Points	Rank	Distance	Points	Rank	Points	Rank
Jacques Charland	Normal hill	76.0	94.5	30	73.0	93.5	27	188.0	27

== Speed skating ==
Men

Event	Athlete	Race	
Event	Athlete	Time	Rank
500 m	Johnny Sands	DNF	–
500 m	Ralf Olin	44.1	36
500 m	Gordon Audley	43.2	25
1500 m	Gordon Audley	2:26.1	53
1500 m	Johnny Sands	2:20.7	45
1500 m	Ralf Olin	2:19.7	41
5000 m	Ralf Olin	8:30.5	33
10,000 m	Ralf Olin	17:59.2	31
