= List of Winter Olympics venues: 1–9 to B =

For the Winter Olympics, there were no venues that started with 1–9, seven venues that started with the letter 'A' and 12 venues started with the letter 'B'.

== 1–9 ==
There are no venues that started with 1–9. This includes the 2014 Winter Olympics in Sochi.

== A ==
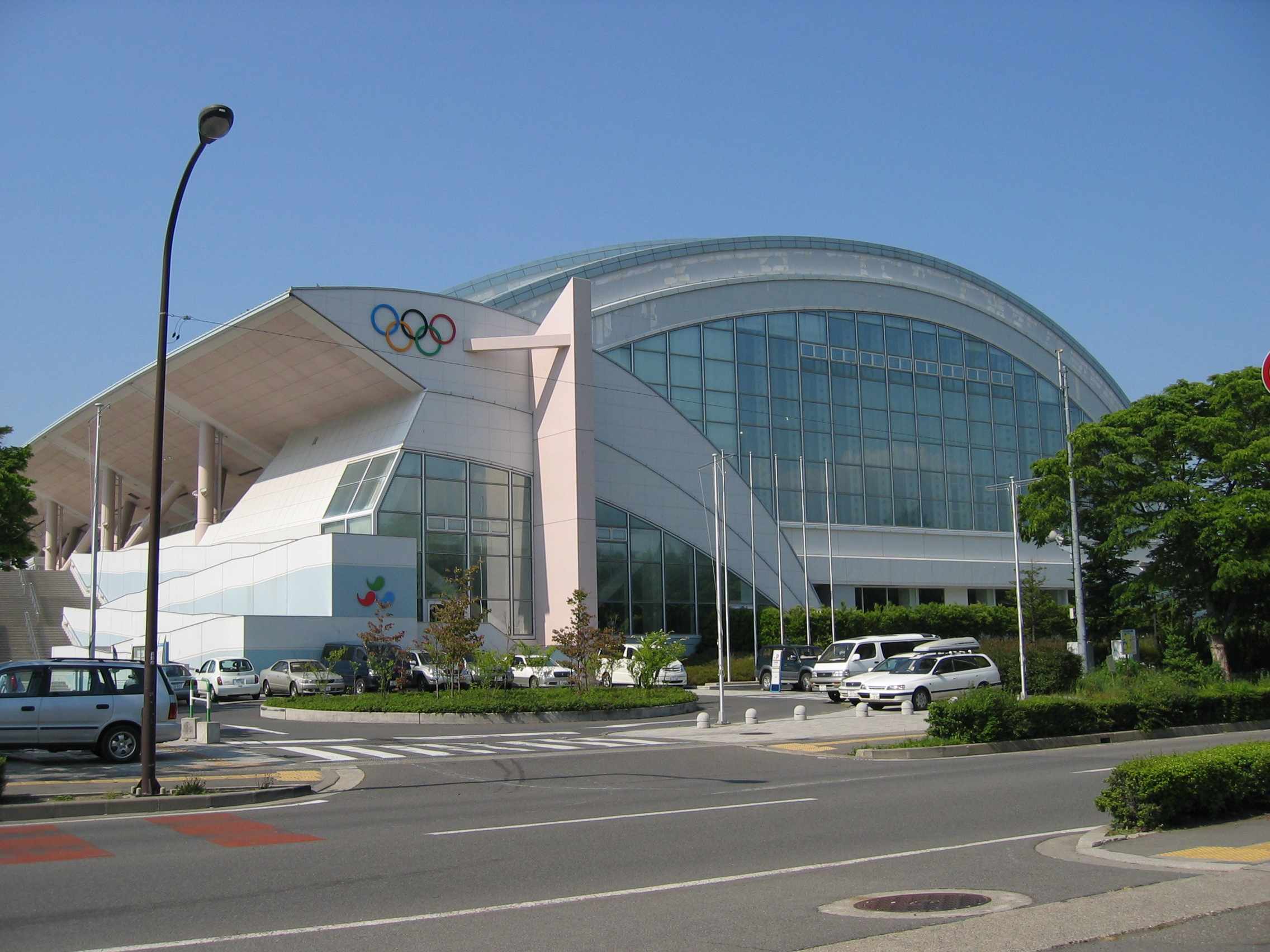
Aqua Wing Arena host some ice hockey games for the 1998 Winter Olympics in Nagano.

Venue	Games	Sports	Capacity	Ref.
Apollonino Stadium	1956 Cortina d'Ampezzo	Ice hockey	2,000	
Aqua Wing	1998 Nagano	Ice hockey	6,000	
Around the hills of St. Moritz	1928 St. Moritz	Cross-country skiing, Nordic combined (cross-country skiing)	Not listed.	
Around the hills of St. Moritz	1948 St. Moritz	Cross-country skiing, Nordic combined (cross-country skiing)	Not listed.	
Autrans	1968 Grenoble	Biathlon, Cross-country skiing, Nordic combined, Ski jumping (normal hill)	40,000 (ski jump)	
Axamer Lizum	1964 Innsbruck	Alpine skiing (all but men's downhill)	Not listed.	
Axamer Lizum	1976 Innsbruck	Alpine skiing (all but men's downhill)	Not listed.	

== B ==
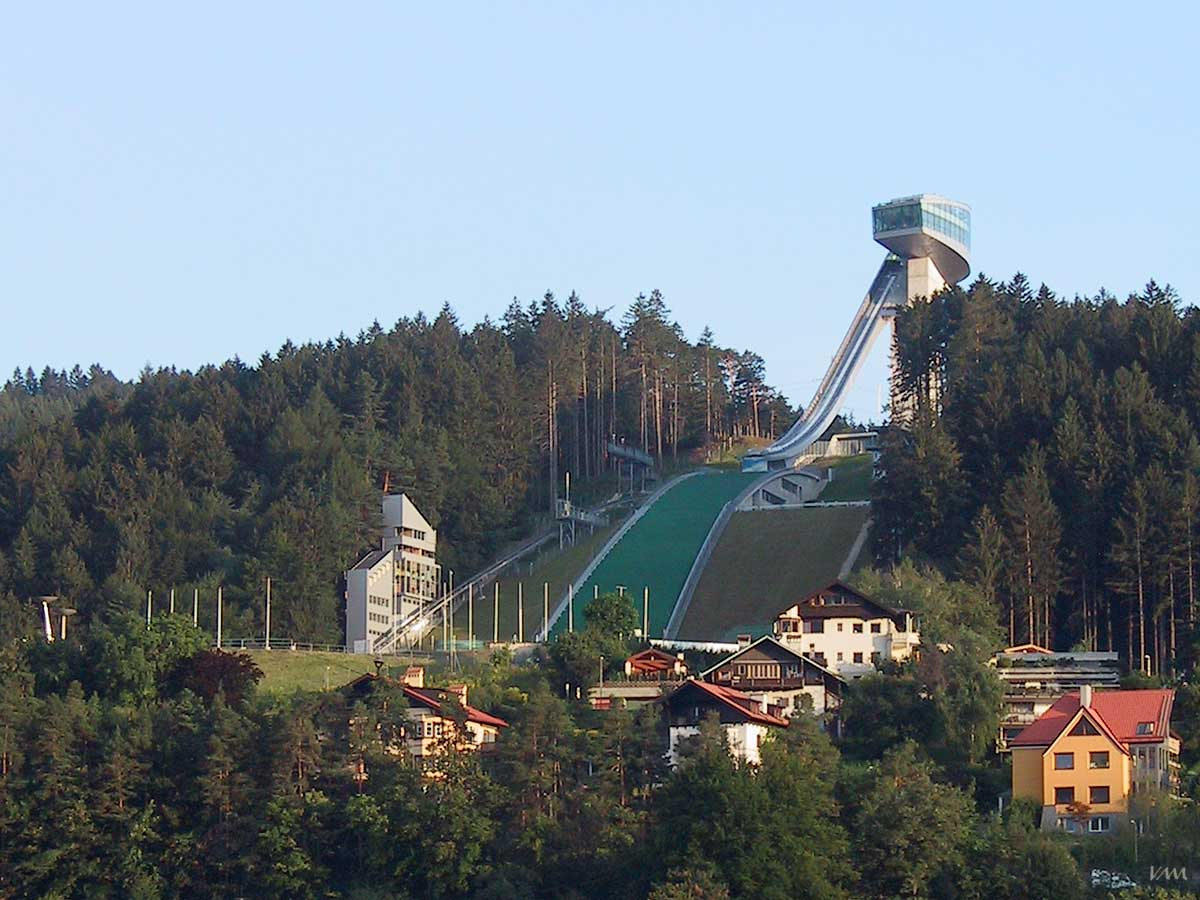
Bergiselschanze hosted the ski jumping large hill events for both the 1964 and 1976 Winter Olympics held in Innsbruck.

Venue	Games	Sports	Capacity	Ref.
BC Place Stadium	2010 Vancouver	Ceremonies (opening/ closing)	54,500	
Bardonecchia	2006 Turin	Snowboarding	6,763	
Bergiselschanze	1964 Innsbruck	Ski jumping (large hill)	Not listed.	
Bergiselschanze	1976 Innsbruck	Ski jumping (large hill)	Not listed.	
Biathlon & Ski Complex	2014 Sochi	Biathlon, Cross-country skiing, Nordic combined (cross-country skiing)	9,600 (biathlon); 9,600 (cross-country skiing)	
Big Hat	1998 Nagano	Ice hockey (final)	10,104	
Beijing National Aquatics Centre	2022 Beijing	Curling	5,000	
Beijing National Indoor Stadium	2022 Beijing	Ice hockey	18,000	
Beijing National Stadium	2022 Beijing	Ceremonies (opening/closing)	80,000	
Birkebeineren Skistadion	1994 Lillehammer	Biathlon, Cross-country skiing, Nordic combined (Cross-country skiing)	31,000 (Cross-country skiing); 13,500 (Biathlon)	
Bislett stadion	1952 Oslo	Bandy (demonstration), Figure skating, speed skating	29,000	
Bolshoy Ice Dome	2014 Sochi	Ice hockey (final)	12,000	
Bjelašnica	1984 Sarajevo	Alpine skiing (men)	Not listed.	
Blyth Arena	1960 Squaw Valley	Figure skating, Ice hockey (final)	8,500	
Bob und Rodelbahn Igls	1964 Innsbruck	Bobsleigh, Luge (separate tracks)	Not listed.	
