= Edward Sampson =

Edward Sampson may refer to:

- Ed Sampson (1921–1974), American ice hockey player
- Ted Sampson (born 1935), British sprinter
- Edward Sampson (priest) (fl. 1728–1736), Irish Anglican priest
