= Martin Brodeur =

Canadian-American ice hockey player (born 1972)

- Hockey Hall of Fame, 2018
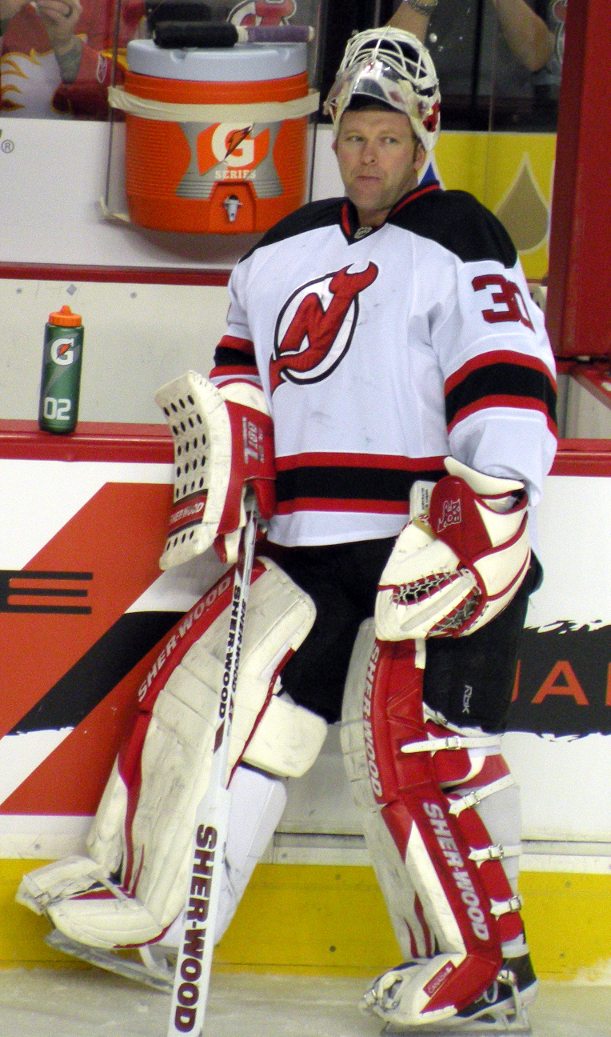
- Brodeur with the New Jersey Devils in January 2012
- Born: May 6, 1972 (age 54) Montreal, Quebec, Canada
- Height: 6 ft 2 in (188 cm)
- Weight: 220 lb (100 kg; 15 st 10 lb)
- Position: Goaltender
- Caught: Left
- Played for: New Jersey Devils; St. Louis Blues
- National team: Canada
- NHL draft: 20th overall, 1990; New Jersey Devils
- Playing career: 1991–2015

Martin Pierre Brodeur (French pronunciation: [maʁtɛ̃ bʁɔdœʁ]; born May 6, 1972) is a Canadian-American professional ice hockey executive and former player. He played 22 seasons as a goaltender in the National Hockey League (NHL), 21 of them for the New Jersey Devils, with whom he won three Stanley Cup championships and five Eastern Conference championships in 17 postseason campaigns. He also won two Olympic gold medals with Canada, his first as the starting goaltender for the team in 2002, and his second as the backup goaltender in 2010, as well as several other medals with Canada in other international competitions. Brodeur is widely regarded as one of the greatest goaltenders of all time. In 2017, he was named by the league as one of the "100 Greatest NHL Players", and the following year, he was elected to the Hockey Hall of Fame.

Brodeur holds numerous NHL and franchise records among goaltenders; he ranks as the league's all-time regular season leader in wins (691), losses (397), shutouts (125), and games played (1,266). He won at least 30 games in twelve straight seasons between 1995–96 and 2007–08 and is the only goaltender in NHL history with eight 40-win seasons. He is a four-time Vezina Trophy winner, a five-time William M. Jennings Trophy winner, a ten-time NHL All-Star, and a Calder Memorial Trophy winner. He is one of 18 NHL goaltenders to score a goal in the regular season and the second to do so in the playoffs; his three goals are the most of any NHL goaltender. He only had three seasons where he posted more losses than wins.

Brodeur used a hybrid style of goaltending by standing up more than typical butterfly style goaltenders, though he adapted to more modern techniques at the latter stage of his career. He was known for his puck handling, his positional play, and his reflexes, especially with his glove hand. Brodeur's prowess at puck handling was so well known that it led in part to the NHL changing its rules to restrict where goaltenders were allowed to handle the puck outside of the goal crease, adding what is known as "the Brodeur rule" after the 2004–05 NHL lockout. He announced his retirement in the middle of the 2014–15 season after a brief stint with the St. Louis Blues, having played in just seven games with the team. He is the current executive vice president of business development for the Devils.

== Early life ==
Brodeur was born on May 6, 1972, in Montreal. He is one of five children of Denis and Mireille Brodeur. Denis played in the 1956 Winter Olympics for Canada and won a bronze medal. After his playing career, Denis was a longtime photographer for the Montreal Canadiens. For more than 20 years, he attended all Montreal games and practices, and when Martin was old enough, he came along. Brodeur idolized Canadiens goaltender Patrick Roy, as well as Flyers goaltender Ron Hextall.

Brodeur started playing hockey as a forward. His goaltending career began when his coach asked him if he wanted to play as a backup at the position in a youth tournament. Brodeur explained:

The next season my coach came up to me and said, 'Do you want to be a goalie or forward this year?' It was the biggest decision of my life, and I was seven years old. I don't know why I decided, but I thought it would be fun to play goal.

When he was 12 years old, Brodeur briefly intended to stop playing hockey, after he had been removed from his team's lineup for not showing up at a game. Following a conversation with his brother Claude, though, he decided to continue playing. When receiving goaltending instructions in his teens, Brodeur was taught a variety of different styles, ranging from butterfly to stand-up, and paid attention to the technique of others playing the position. He attended a camp run by retired Soviet goaltender Vladislav Tretiak, who encouraged the use of multiple methods; Brodeur believes that the concept made him "a student of the game." In the 1989–90 season, he made it to the Quebec Major Junior League. While playing with the Saint-Hyacinthe Laser, Brodeur made the QMJHL All-Rookie team in 1989–90 and the QMJHL Second All-Star Team in 1991–92. Brodeur was drafted by the New Jersey Devils in the first round (20th overall) in the 1990 NHL entry draft.

== NHL career ==
=== New Jersey Devils ===
==== 1991–1995 ====
Brodeur with the Utica Devils during the 1992–93 AHL season

In the 1991–92 NHL season, Brodeur spent most of his time with Saint-Hyacinthe in the QMJHL, but was called up to the NHL on an emergency basis for four games when New Jersey goaltenders Chris Terreri and Craig Billington became injured. Brodeur won his NHL debut against the Boston Bruins, 4–2, and played in one playoff game that season. Brodeur spent the following season with the Utica Devils of the American Hockey League (AHL). However, in the 1993–94 season, Brodeur returned to the NHL permanently and gained recognition when he won the Calder Trophy, an annual award for the best rookie in the NHL. He led the Devils to the second-best record in the league and the Eastern Conference finals in the playoffs, where they lost to the New York Rangers in seven games. He finished second in goals against average (GAA) (2.40) and fourth in save percentage (.915) in 47 games played during the regular season, helping him eventually land the starting job over Terreri.

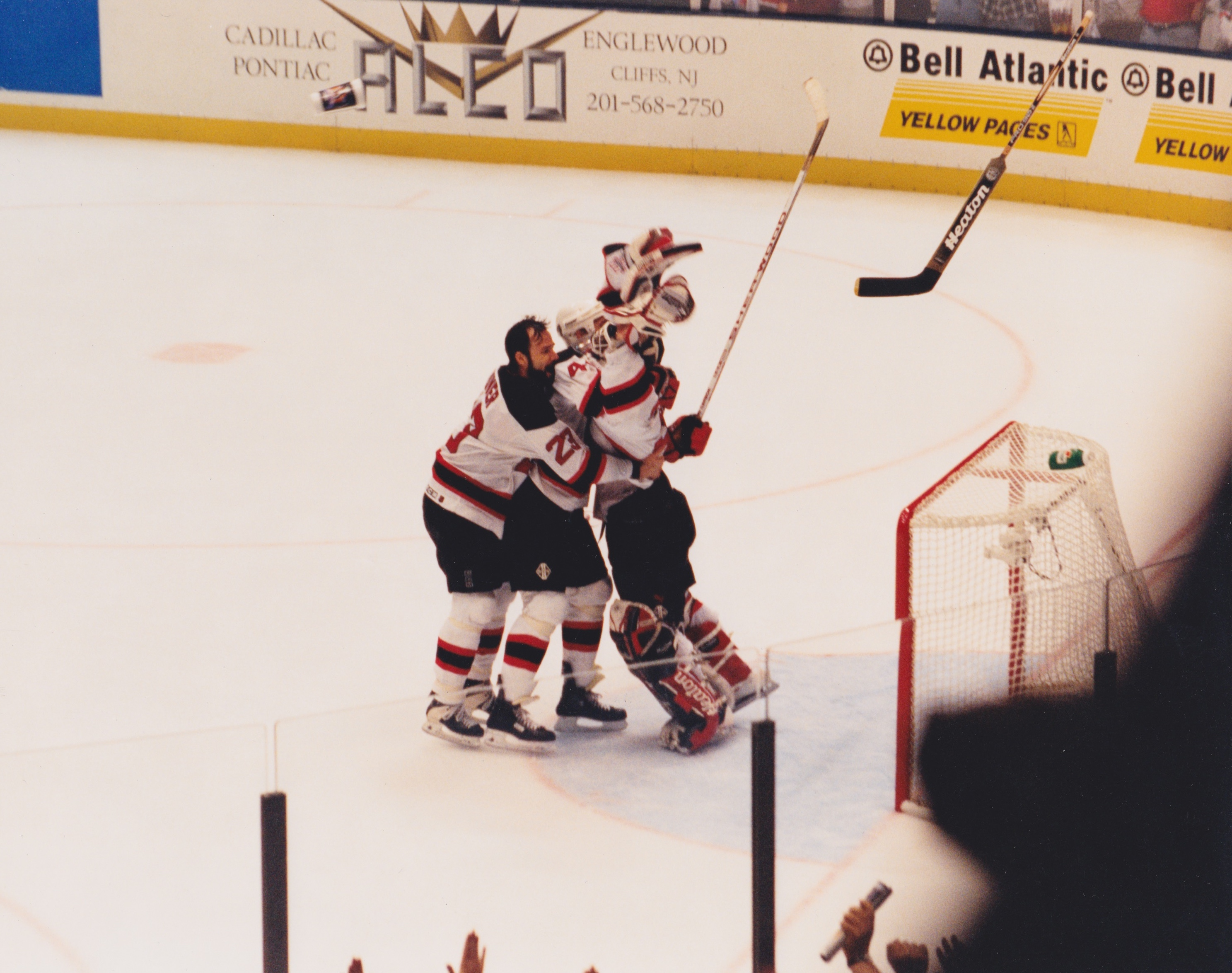
Brodeur is mobbed by teammates upon the Devils winning the 1995 Stanley Cup Final

In the 1994–95 NHL season, which was shortened to 48 games due to an extended lockout, the Devils finished tied for ninth overall, fifth in their conference. With the leadership of Brodeur, they defeated the Boston Bruins in the first round, shutting them out in three of their four wins. In the second round against the Pittsburgh Penguins, Brodeur gave up nine goals and helped the Devils defeat the Penguins in five games. In the third round, the Devils defeated the Philadelphia Flyers in six games, giving them their first Stanley Cup Final appearance in franchise history, against the heavily-favoured Detroit Red Wings. The strong play of Brodeur and the Devils' "trap" method of defence made the series lopsided in favour of New Jersey, who swept the Red Wings in four games, while holding them to just seven goals in those games. Brodeur won a Stanley Cup in his second full season in the NHL. After the victory, he was quoted as saying:

In the last game against Detroit, the time from ten minutes left to one minute left was probably the longest nine minutes of my life. But from one to zero was probably the greatest time I've ever had. I didn't want the clock to run out. It was such a great feeling: people crying in the stands, people jumping up and down, people cheering. Guys couldn't even sit up on the bench. It was probably the best minute of my life.

==== 1995–1999 ====
After a year of success, the Devils were in the middle of the pack for most of the 1995–96 season and barely missed the playoffs. Brodeur played in 74 of his team's 82 games, setting a single-season record for most minutes played by a goaltender, while having the second-most shutouts (6) in the league. He was named the starter in the All-Star Game for the Eastern Conference and stopped all 12 shots he faced. He finished fourth in voting for the Vezina Trophy, which is awarded to the league's top goaltender. Brodeur also played for Canada during the 1996 World Cup of Hockey, where Canada lost to the United States in the gold medal games.

In the 1996–97 season, the Devils finished third in the NHL. Brodeur was runner-up for the Vezina Trophy, was named to the All-Star Game, and had the lowest goals against average by a goaltender in almost 30 years, earning him the Jennings Trophy. He also had 10 shutouts and a .927 save percentage. On April 17, 1997, in the first game of a first-round playoff matchup against the Montreal Canadiens, Brodeur fired the puck the length of the ice and into the Canadiens' empty net to ensure a 5–2 victory. It was the second time in NHL history that a goaltender had scored in the playoffs, and the fifth time overall. The Devils went on to win that series, but lost in the second round to the rival New York Rangers.

The following year, Brodeur had 43 wins and 10 shutouts in the regular season. The Devils finished first in the Eastern Conference, but lost in the first round of the playoffs to the eighth-seeded Ottawa Senators. Once again, Brodeur made the All-Star Game, finished as a runner-up for the Vezina Trophy, and won the Jennings Trophy.

In the 1998–99 season, the Devils finished first in the Eastern Conference for the third straight year, with Brodeur winning 39 games. He was among the contenders for the Vezina Trophy and started in the All-Star Game, making his fourth appearance. However, the Devils lost in the first round to the Penguins. It was Brodeur's worst playoff performance statistically, as he allowed 20 goals in seven games with an .856 save percentage.

==== 1999–2004 ====
During the 1999–2000 season, on February 15, 2000, Brodeur was credited with his second career goal, as Brodeur was the last Devils player on the ice to touch the puck before Daymond Langkow of the Flyers accidentally put the puck into his own empty net during a delayed penalty call against the Devils. Brodeur had previously stopped an attempted Flyers shot.

That season, Brodeur won 43 games for the second time in his career, and the Devils finished with the fourth spot in the Eastern Conference after losing the division to the Flyers by two points. Brodeur helped the Devils sweep the Florida Panthers in the first round, giving up six goals in four games. In the next round against the Toronto Maple Leafs he recorded two shutouts, including one in game six of the series as the Devils won 4–2, setting up a showdown with rival Philadelphia Flyers in the Eastern Conference finals. The Flyers took a 3–1 series lead and could close out the series at First Union Center in Philadelphia, but Brodeur gave up only one goal in each of the remaining three games of the series, propelling the Devils to a comeback series victory in seven games. They went on to play the Dallas Stars in the Stanley Cup Final, who had a higher seed but one fewer regular season points, giving the Devils home-ice advantage in the series. After taking game one with a seven-goal rally against Dallas, Brodeur led the Devils the rest of the way as he gave up six goals in the next five games, giving the team their second Stanley Cup championship in six years.

The next year, Brodeur topped the 40-win mark for the third time in his career, despite having an average GAA and save-percentage throughout the season. He played in the All-Star Game for the sixth consecutive season, and helped the Devils earn the top seed in the Eastern Conference. In the first round Brodeur recorded two shutouts against the Carolina Hurricanes and the Devils took the series in six games. After struggling to beat seventh-seeded Toronto in seven games, the Devils defeated the sixth-seeded Penguins in the Eastern Conference finals, where Brodeur added two more shutouts, both on the road. In their second straight Stanley Cup Final appearance, the Devils played a back-and-forth series against the top seeded Colorado Avalanche, who were led by star goaltender Patrick Roy, and lost in seven games.

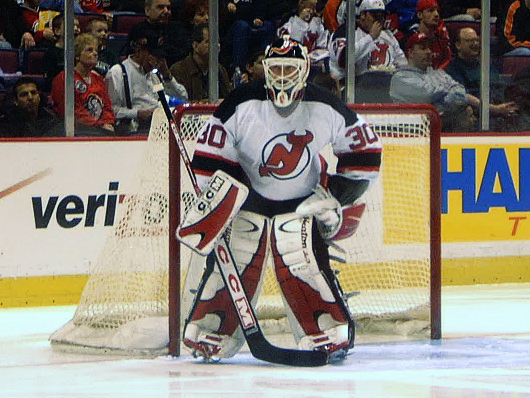
Brodeur during pre-game warmups in March 2003

In the 2001–02 season, Brodeur finished among the league leaders in wins and GAA. Brodeur continued to lead the league in victories and remained a Vezina and MVP candidate. However, the Devils lost in the first round to the Hurricanes. The next season, in 2002–03, Brodeur won the Vezina Trophy for the first time. He also won the Jennings Trophy again, was a Hart Memorial Trophy finalist for the league's Most Valuable Player, and was named a First Team All-Star and started in the All-Star Game. With one of the most impressive playoff performances of his career, Brodeur guided the Devils to their third Stanley Cup victory after seven-game series wins against the top-seeded Ottawa Senators and the seventh-seeded Mighty Ducks of Anaheim. He posted 3 shutouts against Anaheim and had a playoff total of 7 overall, breaking the NHL record of 6 that had been set by Dominik Hašek the previous year. Despite this, the Conn Smythe Trophy for playoff MVP was awarded to Anaheim goaltender Jean-Sébastien Giguère, who became the fifth player not on the championship team to be named playoff MVP since Ron Hextall of Philadelphia in 1987. Some hockey writers speculated a New Jersey player did not win because there were multiple candidates, resulting in a split vote among the sportswriters who selected the winner.

In the 2003–04 season, Brodeur won his second consecutive Vezina Trophy and Jennings Trophy. He was a first Team All-Star, a starter in the NHL All-Star Game, and a finalist for the Hart Trophy again. The Devils lost the Atlantic Division title by 1 point to the Philadelphia Flyers, who thus obtained the third seed and home ice advantage against the sixth-seeded Devils in the first round of the playoffs. This would be too much for Brodeur and the Devils to overcome, as the Flyers went on to defeat them in five games.

==== The Brodeur Rule ====
The goaltender trapezoids behind each goal, added by the NHL before the 2005–06 season, were widely viewed as singling out Brodeur for his puck-handling skills.

After the 2004–05 lockout and before the start of the 2005–06 season, the league instituted a new rule preventing goaltenders from playing the puck behind the goal line, except within a trapezoid-shaped zone located behind the net. The trapezoid began at the goal line with angled lines six feet from each goal post and widened to 28 feet at the end boards. This meant that if Brodeur or any other goaltenders played the puck behind the goal line and not in the trapezoid, a two-minute minor penalty for delay of game would be assessed. Former Flyers general manager Bobby Clarke was one of the leaders in getting the trapezoid implemented. This was viewed by many as singling out Brodeur, who was one of the best at getting behind the net to handle the puck, and has come to be known as the "Brodeur Rule".

At the 2009 NHL General Managers' Meeting, it was discussed whether the rule should be eliminated as a solution to the increasing number of injuries on defenceman who were being hit hard by forechecking forwards. The forecheckers were no longer impeded by defencemen holding them up because of the crackdown on interference, which created situations where defencemen were being hit at high speeds. Brodeur believed that revoking the trapezoid could result in more scoring and more exciting games. He explained, "If you give the liberty to the goalies to play the puck, they'll mess up more than they're successful." He also expressed his concern for defencemen, "It's a no-brainer if they want to start to eliminate these huge hits for the defencemen ... Whenever my defencemen or somebody was getting a big hit, I felt guilty that I let that guy get hit like that. Now, I've got to sit and watch all the time ... You've got to try to find something because so many guys are getting hurt." At the time of his statement, Devils defencemen Paul Martin, Johnny Oduya and Bryce Salvador were all out with injuries.

Ultimately the suggestion was rejected and the rule stayed in place. Former Maple Leafs' general manager Brian Burke said, "We had originally approved a rule where the goaltenders couldn't handle the puck behind the net at all. The game was turning into a tennis match. You'd dump it in and the goalie would throw it out and now with the soft chip into the corner it turns into a puck battle and a forecheck opportunity, which is what we wanted."

The rule was later adopted into the KHL rulebook for the 2019–20 KHL season, and the IIHF rulebook in 2021.

==== 2005–2009 ====
After the 2004–05 NHL lockout canceled the 2004–05 season, Brodeur signed a contract extension with the Devils on January 27, 2006, that would pay him $31.2 million over six years. In the 2005–06 season he posted 43 wins, adding onto his NHL records of what were now five 40-win seasons and ten consecutive 30-win seasons. After struggling early in the season, his improved play later on made him a finalist for the Vezina Trophy for the third straight year, and helped lead the Devils to a surprising comeback in the last two months of the season that resulted in them winning the Atlantic Division in the final game of the year. In the first round of the playoffs, he won a postseason series against the Rangers for the first time in his career, leading the Devils to a four-game sweep. But a 4–1 series loss to the Carolina Hurricanes eliminated the Devils in the next round.

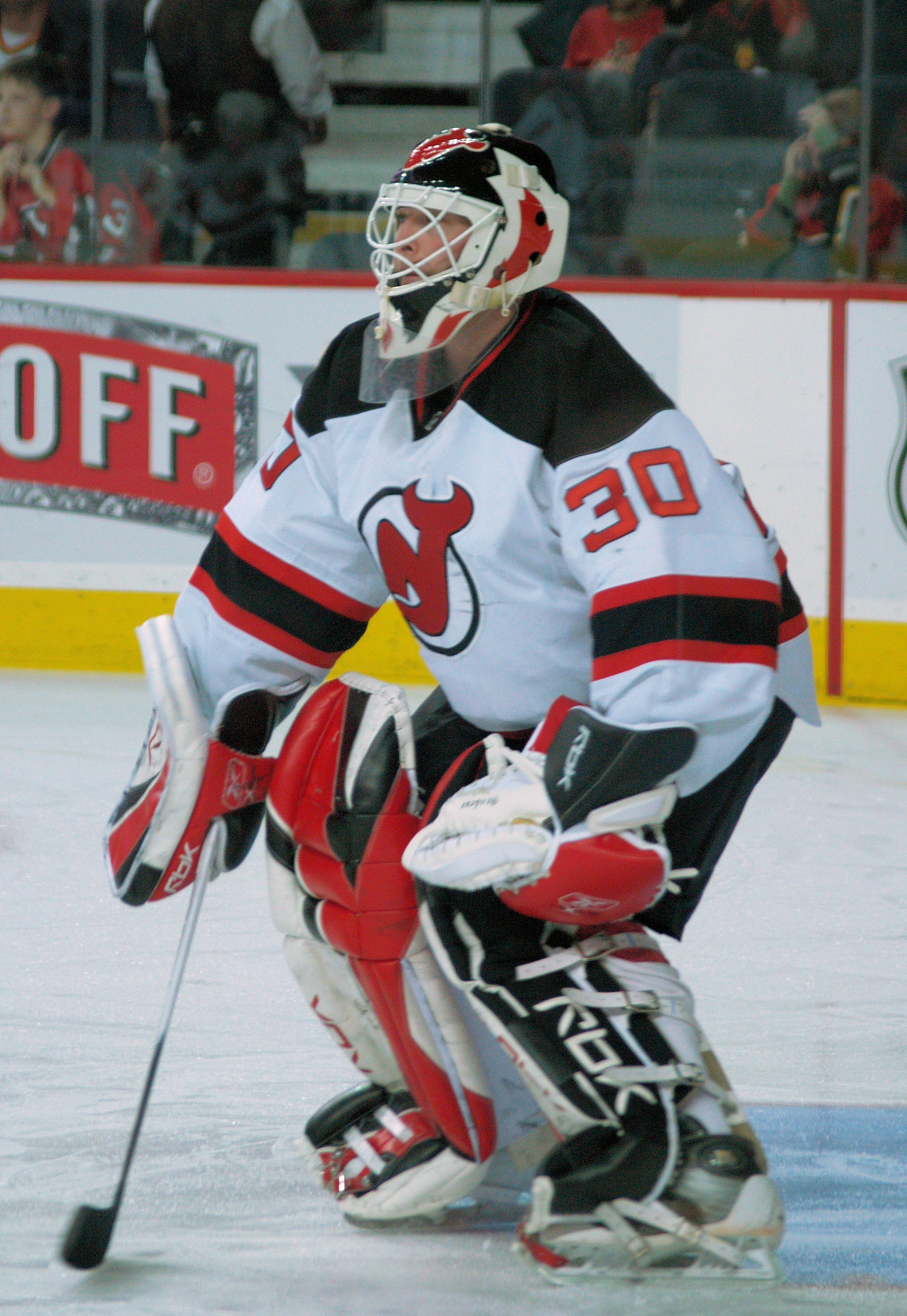
Brodeur in December 2007

In the 2006–07 season, Brodeur made his ninth NHL All-Star Game appearance in Dallas, Texas, won his third Vezina Trophy and rose on several NHL records lists. On December 8, 2006, he posted a 2–0 victory over the Philadelphia Flyers for his 462nd career win, moving him into second place on the all-time list ahead of Ed Belfour. Just a few weeks later, on December 26, Brodeur beat the Pittsburgh Penguins 3–0 to record his 85th career shutout, moving him past Glenn Hall for third place on that all-time list and first place among all active goaltenders. On February 1, 2007, Brodeur beat the Philadelphia Flyers 6–5 in overtime to take the all-time lead in overtime (non-shootout) wins with 45, passing Roy. The Devils' first 38 wins of the season were all with Brodeur in net, leading him to set an NHL record for most consecutive wins for a team.

On April 3, 2007, Brodeur tied the NHL record for most wins in a single season with 47, set by Bernie Parent in 1973–74, in a 2–1 shootout victory against the Ottawa Senators. Two days later, he broke the record with his 48th win in a 3–2 victory over the Philadelphia Flyers, which helped the Devils clinch the Atlantic Division title.

In the Eastern Conference quarterfinals against the Tampa Bay Lightning, Brodeur started out shaky and the Devils fell behind two games to one. He rebounded, however, to finish the series, and helped the team advance in six games, while passing Grant Fuhr for second place in all-time playoff victories. In the second round against the Ottawa Senators, the Devils were defeated in five games as the Senators scored 15 goals during the series.

In the 2007–08 season, Brodeur became the second goaltender in NHL history to reach 500 wins with a victory against the Flyers on November 17, 2007. The only other goaltenders to achieve the feat are Roy and Marc-André Fleury. Brodeur was also named the starting goaltender for the Eastern Conference in the 2008 NHL All-Star Game in Atlanta. However, he was unable to participate because of a family obligation.

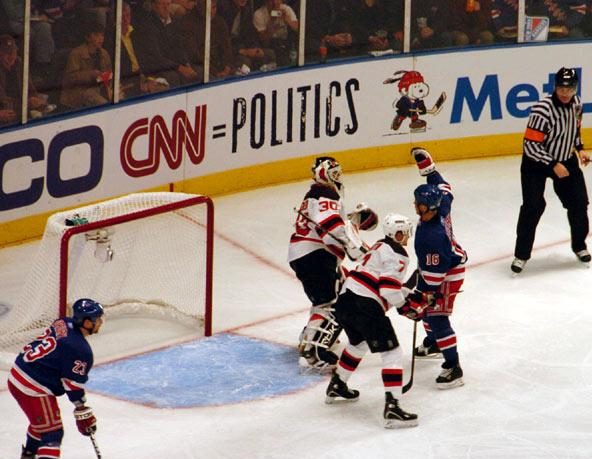
Sean Avery attempts to distract Brodeur during game three of the first round of the 2008 Stanley Cup Playoffs.

After losing a bitter series against the rival Rangers in the opening round of the 2008 NHL playoffs, Brodeur refused to shake Sean Avery's hand. During game three of the series, in an unusual move, Avery turned to face Brodeur during a 5-on-3 power play, and began waving his hands and stick in front of Brodeur's face in an effort to distract him. The day after this game the NHL announced that it had revised its unsportsmanlike conduct rule, now known as The Sean Avery Rule, effectively outlawing such antics.

Brodeur started wearing a new painted mask design for the 2008–09 NHL season with a stylized "MB30" on the front, replacing the "J" that had been on his mask for nearly his entire NHL career. During a game on November 1, 2008, Brodeur suffered a "bruised elbow" which would later be diagnosed as a torn distal biceps tendon, the first major injury in his career. Following surgery on November 6, he would miss 16 weeks of the season before playing his next game on February 26, 2009. Upon returning from the injury, Brodeur registered a 4–0 shutout against the Colorado Avalanche for his 99th career shutout. Three days later, he recorded his 100th career shutout against the Philadelphia Flyers, three short of Terry Sawchuk's NHL record.

==== 2009–2014 ====
Beginning in 2009, Brodeur broke a number of career records for goaltenders. He missed 50 games in the 2008–09 season, but a winning streak upon his return pushed him near the NHL's all-time win record. On March 14, 2009, the Devils defeated the Canadiens 3–1 to give him the 551st win of his career, tying him with Roy for the NHL record. Three days later, Brodeur surpassed Roy with a 3–2 win over the Chicago Blackhawks in New Jersey.

Brodeur topped another of Roy's previous marks on November 27, as he set the record for the most minutes played in the NHL, which had been 60,235. His 1,030th career appearance, which happened on December 18, broke Roy's record of 1,029. He also set the mark for the most regular season shutouts with a 4–0 win against the Penguins on December 21, breaking Sawchuk's record of 103. On December 30, 2009, Brodeur and the Devils shut out the Penguins, 2–0. It was his 105th career shutout, giving him the all-time professional record, surpassing George Hainsworth's total of 104 combined in the NHL (94) and Western Canada Hockey League (10). On April 6, 2010, Brodeur reached his 600th career win by defeating the Thrashers 3–0. This was also his 110th career shutout.

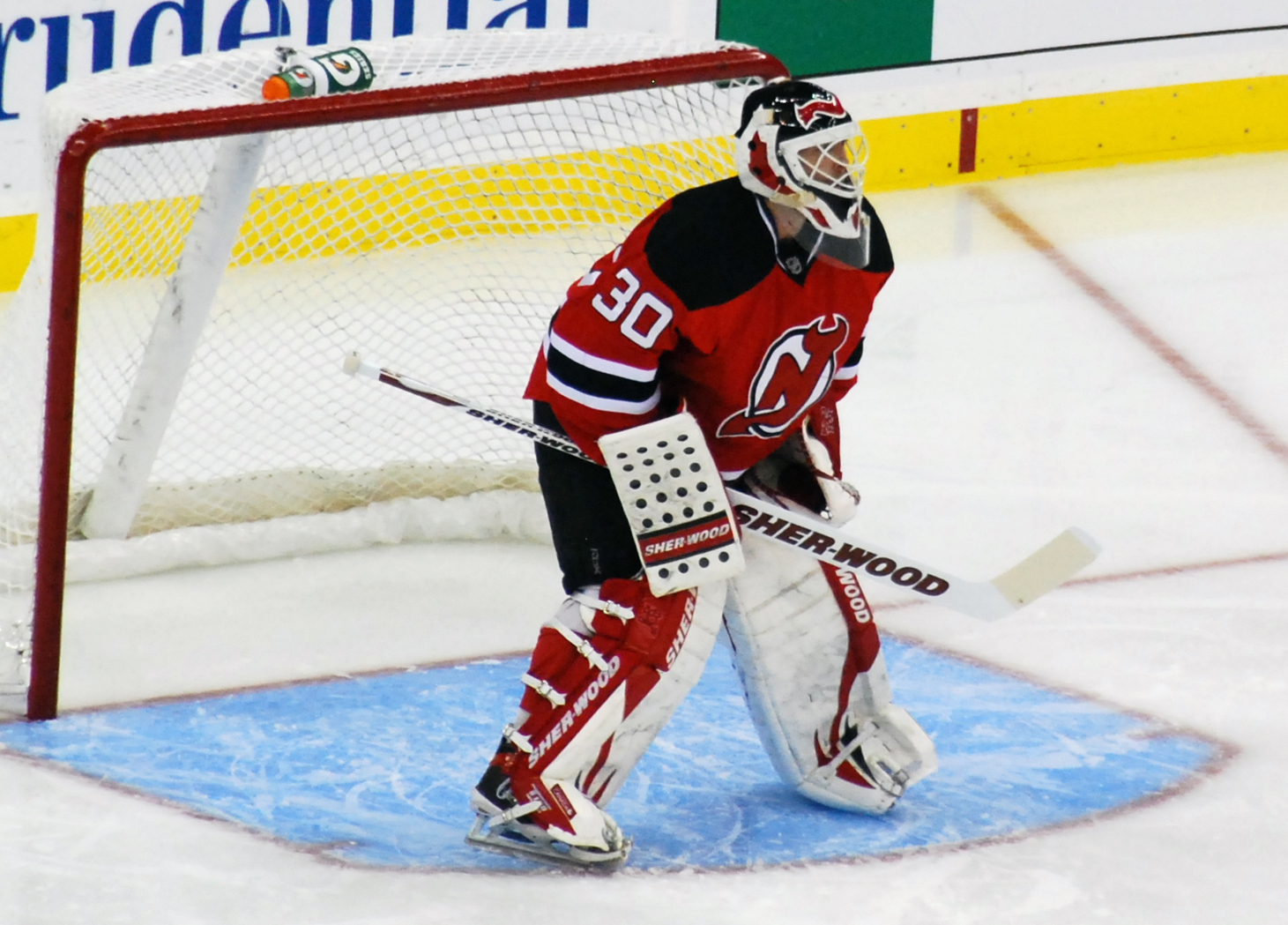
Brodeur tending goal in November 2011

In the 2009–10 NHL season, Brodeur led the NHL in wins (45), shutouts (9), games played (77) and minutes played (4,499). He also won his fifth Jennings Trophy and had the third-best GAA in the league, leading his team to back-to-back division wins that included a 6–0 regular season sweep of the defending Stanley Cup champion Penguins. However, the Devils lost in the first round of the playoffs, losing to the seventh-seeded Flyers in five games.

Brodeur had a 5–18–1 stretch to begin the 2010–11 season, as New Jersey slumped to the bottom of the NHL. Although the Devils improved in the second half of the season, they did not reach the playoffs; Brodeur recorded 23 wins and a 2.45 GAA, but had his lowest save percentage (.903) in 16 seasons.

The Devils returned to the playoffs in the 2011–12 NHL season, as Brodeur recorded his 14th 30-win season. In game one of the conference quarterfinals against the Panthers, Brodeur became the second goaltender to record 100 playoff wins in a 3–2 Devils victory. In game four with a 4–0 victory, Brodeur broke the NHL career playoff shutout record with his 24th, surpassing Roy, who had 23. The Devils advanced by winning game seven in double overtime, after Brodeur had made 43 saves to keep his team in the contest.

Following a second round series win over the Flyers, Brodeur and the Devils defeated the Rangers in six games in the Eastern Conference finals. New Jersey won the sixth game 3–2 on an overtime goal by Adam Henrique, leading to Brodeur's fifth Stanley Cup Final appearance. The Devils lost in the series to the Los Angeles Kings in six games. Brodeur was 14–10 in the postseason with a save percentage of .917, after winning 16 playoff games in the previous eight years.

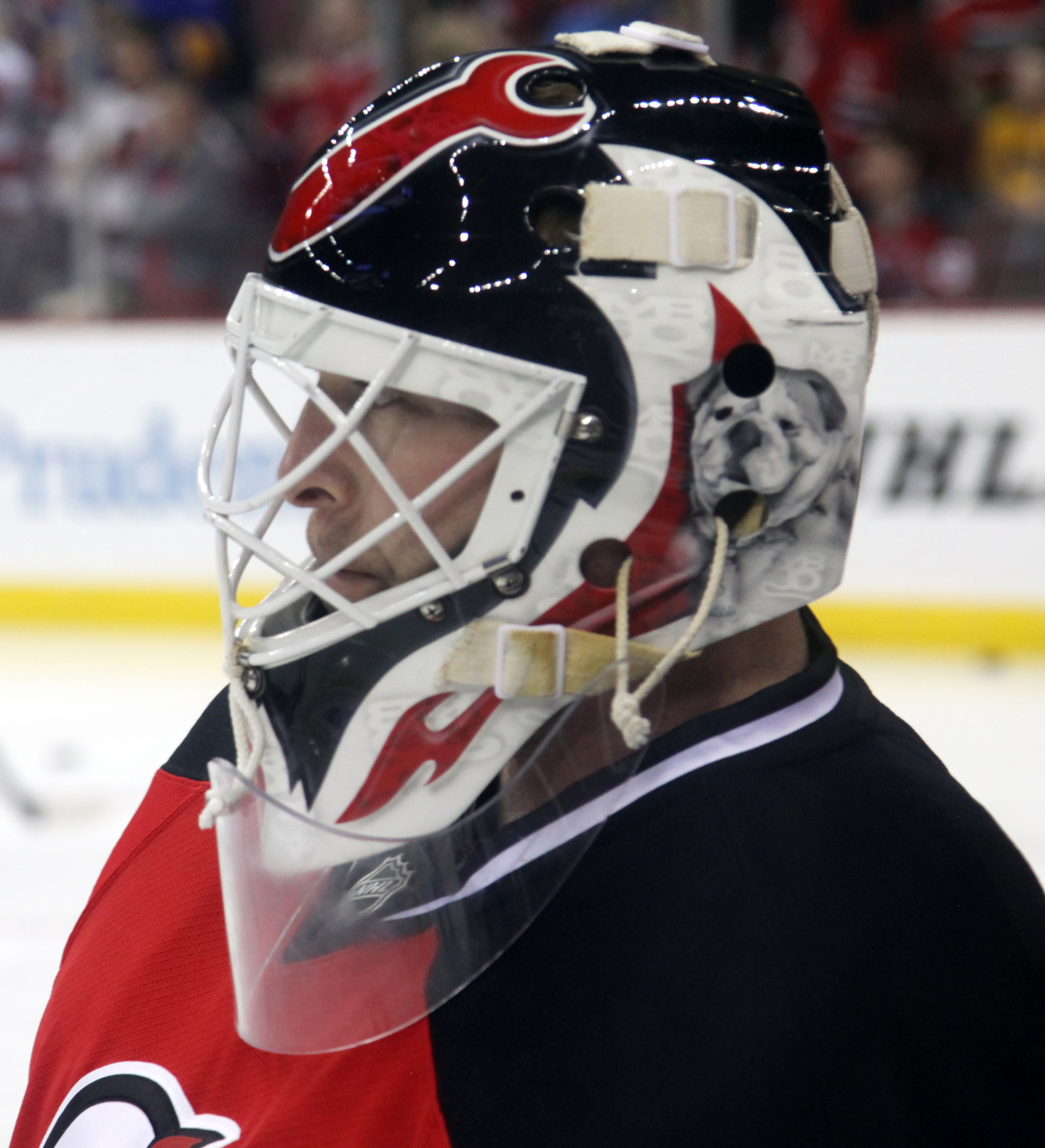
Brodeur before a game in April 2014

During the off-season of 2012, Brodeur hired agent Pat Brisson, leading many analysts to believe he would test free-agency or retire. However, on July 2, 2012, Brodeur agreed to a two-year, $9 million deal to remain with the Devils, alongside backup goaltender Johan Hedberg. On March 21, 2013, in his first game back from a month-long absence due to a pinched nerve injury in his upper back, Brodeur was credited with a power play goal against the Carolina Hurricanes, making him the only NHL goaltender to record three career goals, and the first goaltender to score on the power play since Evgeni Nabokov in 2002. Brodeur had a 13–9–7 record in his 29 appearances in 2012–13, with a 2.22 GAA.

The following season, he shared the Devils' starting goaltender position with Cory Schneider, whose 45 games played were six more than Brodeur's total. Brodeur's statistical performance declined, as his GAA increased to 2.51, more than half a goal higher than Schneider. In 39 games played, Brodeur had a .901 save percentage, lower than the league average. Among his 19 wins in 2013–14 was a victory in the season finale against Boston, his 688th for New Jersey. On June 6, 2014, Brodeur told ESPN he would test the free agency market for the 2014–15 season, and his 21-year tenure with the Devils ended.

=== St. Louis Blues ===
On November 26, 2014, Brodeur signed a tryout contract with the St. Louis Blues after their starting netminder, Brian Elliott, was injured. A week later, on December 2, Brodeur signed a one-year, $700,000 deal with the Blues.

On January 27, 2015, it was reported that Brodeur had decided to retire from the NHL. The decision followed Elliott's return to the Blues, as Brodeur had been demoted to the team's number-three goaltender behind Elliott and Jake Allen. Brodeur announced the news at a press conference two days later. He retired having started just five games with the Blues, going 3–3–0 in seven appearances. His final NHL win was a 3–0 shutout against the Avalanche on December 29, 2014.

== Post-playing career ==
Upon announcing his retirement, Brodeur was hired by the Blues as a special assistant to general manager Doug Armstrong. On May 22, 2015, Armstrong announced that Brodeur and the Blues had agreed to a three-year contract naming Brodeur as an assistant general manager of the team. On February 8, 2016, the New Jersey Devils unveiled a bronze statue of Brodeur which is displayed outside the Prudential Center. The statue was formally dedicated on October 22, 2016, in a ceremony before the game against the Minnesota Wild. On February 9, 2016, Brodeur's number 30 jersey was retired by the Devils.

On July 25, 2017, Brodeur was appointed as management team member for Canada's men's team for the 2018 Winter Olympics in Pyeongchang, South Korea. On August 29, 2018, Brodeur joined the Devils as executive vice president of business development. On January 12, 2020, Brodeur became an advisor on hockey operations after general manager Ray Shero was fired.

== International play ==
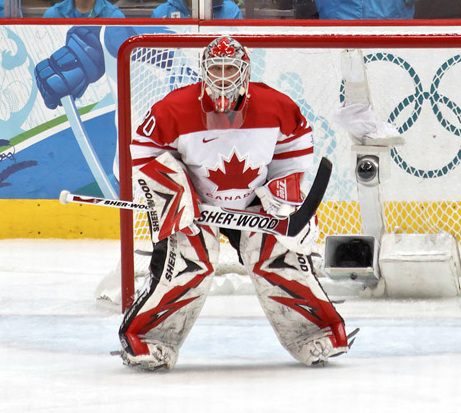
- Brodeur playing for the Canadian national team in the 2010 Winter Olympics

Medal record

Men's ice hockey

Representing Canada

Winter Olympics
Gold medal – first place	2002 Salt Lake City	
Gold medal – first place	2010 Vancouver	

World Championships
Silver medal – second place	1996 Austria	
Silver medal – second place	2005 Austria	

Brodeur was selected as Canada's back-up goaltender to Roy for the 1998 Winter Olympics in Nagano, Japan, but did not get to play. Canada failed to win a medal after losing the bronze-medal match to Finland, a game in which many people thought Brodeur should have played.

In the 2002 Winter Olympics at Salt Lake City, U.S., Brodeur was initially named the backup behind Curtis Joseph. But following Joseph's losing the tournament opener against Sweden, Brodeur was named the starting goaltender the rest of the way, and won gold for Canada. He went undefeated in the tournament, stopping 31 of 33 shots in the gold-medal victory over the United States.

Brodeur then led Canada to the 2004 World Cup of Hockey championship, allowing five goals in five games. He led all goaltenders in GAA and save percentage while going undefeated. He had another impressive performance for the team at the world hockey championships in the following year. After this, The Sports Forecaster 2005–06 said the following:

Brodeur is arguably the top goaltender in the world. Fresh off a World Cup win in 2004 and another strong performance at the 2005 IIHF World hockey championships. He's the game's best puck-handling goaltender, though the NHL's new rules changes may somewhat alter that effectiveness.

Brodeur was selected as Canada's starter in the 2006 Winter Olympics in Turin, Italy. He started in 4 games, but Canada failed to win a medal after losing to Russia in the quarterfinals.

He was one of the three goaltenders for Canada in the 2010 Winter Olympics in Vancouver, Canada. He registered a shootout win against Switzerland and a loss to the United States. After the loss to the US, he was benched for the remainder of the 2010 Games in favour of Roberto Luongo.

== Personal life ==
Brodeur married Melanie Dubois (a native of Saint-Liboire, Quebec) in August 1995. They have four children: Anthony, born in 1995; twin sons, William and Jeremy, born in 1996; and Anabelle Antoinette, 2002. Melanie filed for divorce during the 2003 playoffs amid reports that Brodeur was having an affair with Genevieve Nault, the wife of Melanie's brother. The incident was referred to by opposing fans during the playoffs. The reports proved to be true, as he and Genevieve married in June 2008. Their first child together, Maxime Philippe Brodeur, was born in November 2009.

Brodeur is regarded as an engaging raconteur in his spare time. He has hosted a street hockey tournament in his hometown of Saint-Leonard, Quebec, for each of the Devils' Stanley Cup championships, where he played as a forward. His oldest brother, Denis Jr., is a photographer like their late father, Denis Brodeur, and his other older brother, Claude, was a minor league baseball pitcher in the Montreal Expos' organization. He has two sisters, Line and Sylvie.

In 2005, Brodeur began co-authoring his autobiography, Brodeur: Beyond the Crease, with long-time Toronto Star columnist and ESPN contributor Damien Cox, which was released in October 2006. Some of the things Brodeur talks about in the book are player salaries and contracts, NHL marketing, Lou Lamoriello, and the Devils' new arena in Newark, the Prudential Center. Brodeur also includes his views on the "new NHL" after the lockout, and how it affected his career.

Brodeur co-owns a business called La Pizzeria Etc. with former teammate Sheldon Souray. The idea came about after Souray was traded to play in Montreal, the city in which the business now operates.

Brodeur resides in New Jersey, and became a naturalized United States citizen on December 1, 2009, but per IIHF rules would only be able to compete for Canada.

On June 30, 2013, the Devils traded for the 208th pick in the 2013 NHL entry draft and Brodeur was asked to make the announcement to select his son, Anthony. In August 2015, Anthony signed with the Penticton Vees of the British Columbia Hockey League.

Fans picked Brodeur to appear on the cover of the video game NHL 14, choosing him in a series of votes that included 60 players. He was the first goaltender to have his image on the cover since John Vanbiesbrouck on NHL 97.

== Career statistics ==
=== Regular season and playoffs ===
Bold indicates led league
Bold italics indicate NHL record

			Regular season										Playoffs
Season	Team	League	GP	W	L	T	OTL	MIN	GA	SO	GAA	SV%	GP	W	L	MIN	GA	SO	GAA	SV%
1989–90	Saint-Hyacinthe Laser	QMJHL	42	23	13	2	—	2,333	156	0	4.01	—	12	5	7	678	46	0	4.07	—
1990–91	Saint-Hyacinthe Laser	QMJHL	52	22	24	4	—	2,946	162	2	3.30	—	4	0	4	232	16	0	4.14	—
1991–92	Saint-Hyacinthe Laser	QMJHL	48	27	16	4	—	2,846	161	2	3.39	—	5	2	3	317	14	0	2.65	—
1991–92	New Jersey Devils	NHL	4	2	1	0	—	179	10	0	3.35	.882	1	0	1	32	3	0	5.62	.800
1992–93	Utica Devils	AHL	32	14	13	5	—	1,952	131	0	4.03	.884	4	1	3	258	18	0	4.18	—
1993–94	New Jersey Devils	NHL	47	27	11	8	—	2,625	105	3	2.40	.915	17	8	9	1,171	38	1	1.95	.928
1994–95	New Jersey Devils	NHL	40	19	11	6	—	2,184	89	3	2.45	.902	**20**	**16**	4	**1,222**	34	**3**	**1.67**	**.927**
1995–96	New Jersey Devils	NHL	77	34	30	12	—	**4,433**	173	6	2.34	.911	—	—	—	—	—	—	—	—
1996–97	New Jersey Devils	NHL	67	37	14	13	—	3,838	120	**10**	**1.88**	.927	10	5	5	659	19	2	**1.73**	.929
1997–98	New Jersey Devils	NHL	70	**43**	17	8	—	4,128	130	10	1.89	.917	6	2	4	366	12	0	1.97	.927
1998–99	New Jersey Devils	NHL	70	**39**	21	10	—	4,239	162	4	2.29	.906	7	3	4	425	20	0	2.83	.856
1999–00	New Jersey Devils	NHL	72	**43**	20	8	—	4,312	161	6	2.24	.910	**23**	**16**	7	**1,450**	39	2	**1.61**	.927
2000–01	New Jersey Devils	NHL	72	**42**	17	11	—	4,297	166	9	2.32	.906	25	15	10	1,505	52	**4**	2.07	.897
2001–02	New Jersey Devils	NHL	**73**	38	26	9	—	**4,347**	156	4	2.15	.906	6	2	4	381	9	1	1.42	.938
2002–03	New Jersey Devils	NHL	73	**41**	23	9	—	4,374	147	**9**	2.02	.914	**24**	**16**	8	**1,491**	41	**7**	1.65	.934
2003–04	New Jersey Devils	NHL	**75**	**38**	26	11	—	**4,555**	154	**11**	2.03	.917	5	1	4	298	13	0	2.62	.902
2005–06	New Jersey Devils	NHL	73	**43**	23	—	7	4,365	187	5	2.57	.911	9	5	4	473	20	1	2.25	.923
2006–07	New Jersey Devils	NHL	**78**	**48**	23	—	7	**4,697**	171	**12**	2.18	.922	11	5	6	688	28	1	2.44	.916
2007–08	New Jersey Devils	NHL	77	44	27	—	6	**4,635**	168	4	2.17	.920	5	1	4	300	16	0	3.19	.891
2008–09	New Jersey Devils	NHL	31	19	9	—	3	1,814	73	5	2.41	.916	7	3	4	427	17	1	2.39	.929
2009–10	New Jersey Devils	NHL	**77**	**45**	25	—	6	**4,499**	168	**9**	2.24	.916	5	1	4	299	15	0	3.01	.881
2010–11	New Jersey Devils	NHL	56	23	26	—	3	3,116	172	6	2.45	.903	—	—	—	—	—	—	—	—
2011–12	New Jersey Devils	NHL	59	31	21	—	4	3,392	136	4	2.41	.908	**24**	14	9	1,471	52	1	2.12	.917
2012–13	New Jersey Devils	NHL	29	13	9	—	7	1,757	65	2	2.22	.901	—	—	—	—	—	—	—	—
2013–14	New Jersey Devils	NHL	39	19	14	—	6	2,297	96	3	2.51	.901	—	—	—	—	—	—	—	—
2014–15	St. Louis Blues	NHL	7	3	3	—	0	356	17	1	2.87	.899	—	—	—	—	—	—	—	—
NHL totals			1,266	691	397	105	49	74,438	2,781	125	2.24	.912	205	113	91	12,717	428	24	2.02	.919

=== International ===
Bolded numbers indicate tournament leader

Year	Team	Event	GP	W	L	T	MIN	GA	SO	GAA	SV%
1996	Canada	WC	3	0	1	1	140	8	0	3.43	.871
1996	Canada	WCH	2	0	1	0	60	4	0	4.00	.846
1998	Canada	OLY	—	—	—	—	—	—	—	—	—
2002	Canada	OLY	5	**4**	0	1	300	9	0	**1.80**	.917
2004	Canada	WCH	5	**5**	0	0	300	5	1	**1.00**	.961
2005	Canada	WC	7	5	2	0	419	20	0	2.87	.908
2006	Canada	OLY	4	2	2	0	238	8	0	2.01	.923
2010	Canada	OLY	2	1	1	0	124	6	0	2.90	.867
Senior totals			29	17	7	2	1,601	60	1	2.25	—

== Legacy ==
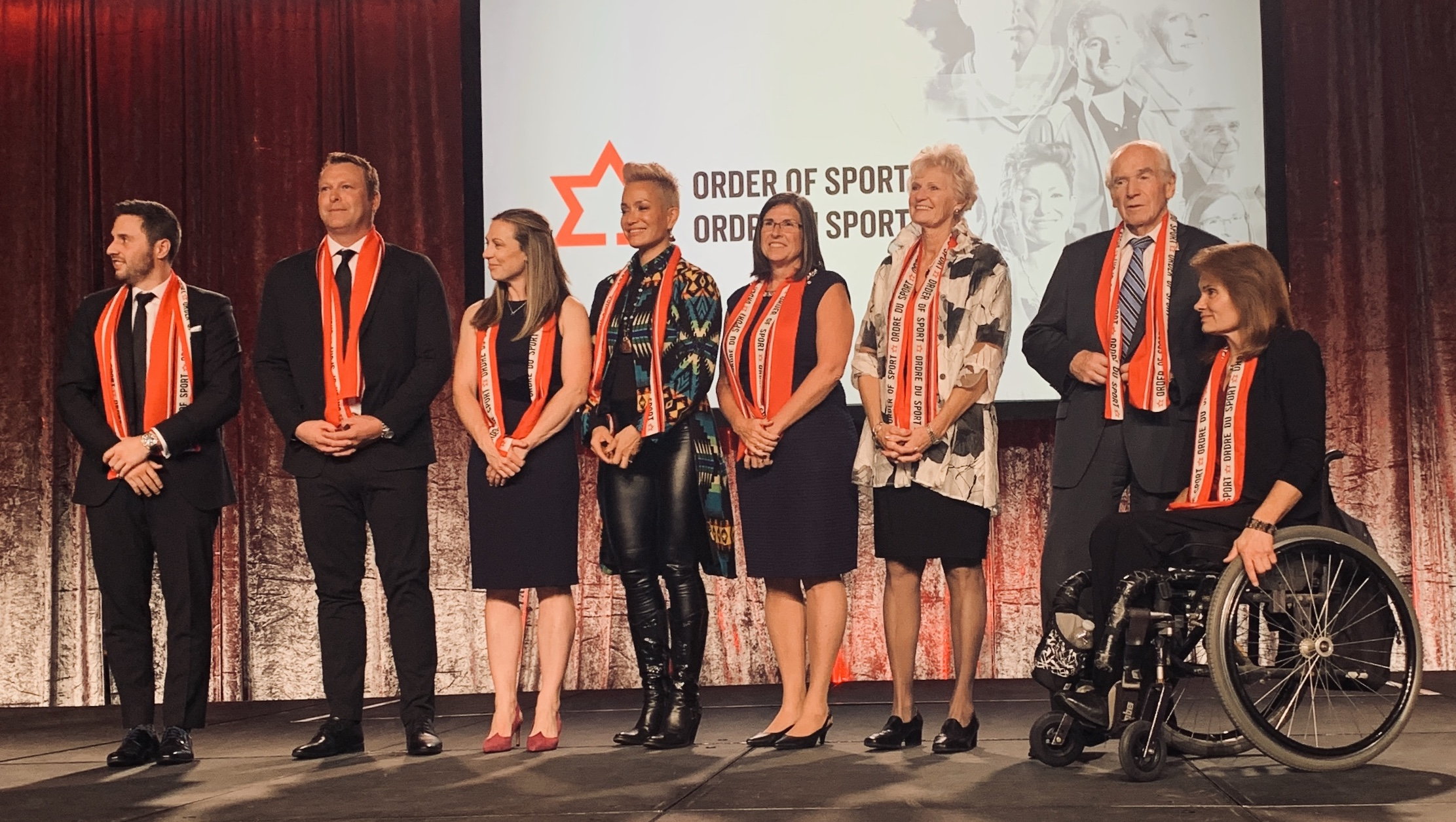
Brodeur (second from left) and other inductees into Canada's Sports Hall of Fame receive the Order of Sport award in October 2019.

During his NHL career, Brodeur set numerous league records. He ended his career with 691 wins, the most in NHL history. Brodeur extended his record shutout total to 125, 22 more than second-place Sawchuk. After his final season, he had played in 1,266 regular season games, a total more than 200 above that of any other goaltender. In nine seasons, Brodeur was the NHL wins leader, and in five other seasons he was among the top five goaltenders in the category. Brodeur's honors include four Vezina Trophy wins as the top goaltender in the NHL, and the 1993–94 Calder Trophy as rookie of the year. His total of five Jennings Trophies is tied for the most in NHL history, matching Roy's record. In postseason play, he had the most shutouts of any NHL goaltender (24), and his 113 playoff wins ranks second all-time.

Sportswriters and players have called Brodeur one of the greatest goaltenders in NHL history. USA Today's Kevin Allen placed Brodeur in a group including Roy and Sawchuk as the leading NHL goaltender, noting that Brodeur had the advantage in wins. Writer Steve Politi noted Brodeur's longevity as an advantage on other top all-time goaltenders such as Roy; Brodeur played 70 or more games in 12 seasons, compared to 0 for Roy. Sportsnet's Chris Boyle, after running a statistical analysis, placed Brodeur eighth in his all-time goaltending list; he offered the rationale that Brodeur's teammates helped him achieve his major records, while goaltenders such as Roy and Hašek had superior stats in their best seasons.

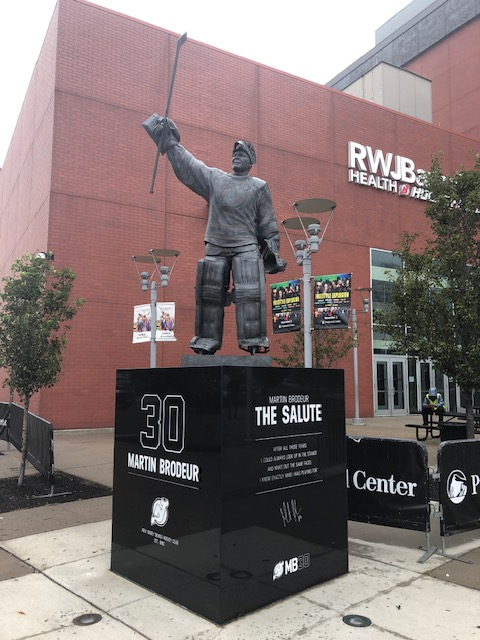
Brodeur's The Salute statue outside Prudential Center

Brodeur is remembered for his playing style: writer Katie Strang called him "one of the most innovative [goalies] ever to play the game", due to his "superior puck-handling skills". Scott Gomez, a former teammate of Brodeur in New Jersey, considered his goaltender to be the equivalent of an extra defenceman. A rule disallowing goaltenders from handling the puck outside a trapezoid shaped area behind the net is called "The Brodeur Rule" by some who believe his tendency to play the puck in the corners inspired the rule. His playing style proved uncommon among goaltenders of his era, as most of his competitors used a butterfly style exclusively.

The Salute, a bronze statue of Martin Brodeur by Jon Krawczyk, was installed outside Prudential Center in Newark, New Jersey in 2016. On June 26, 2018, it was announced that Brodeur would be inducted into the Hockey Hall of Fame. In 2019, Brodeur was awarded the Order of Sport and inducted into Canada's Sports Hall of Fame.

== Awards and honours ==
QMJHL

Award	Year(s)
All-Rookie Team	1990
Second All-Star Team	1992

NHL

Award	Year(s)
All-Rookie Team	1994
All-Star Game	1996, 1997, 1998, 1999, 2000, 2001, 2003, 2004, 2007
Calder Memorial Trophy	1994
EA Sports NHL cover athlete	2014
First All-Star Team	2003, 2004, 2007
Second All-Star Team	1997, 1998, 2006, 2008
Stanley Cup champion	1995, 2000, 2003
Vezina Trophy	2003, 2004, 2007, 2008
William M. Jennings Trophy	1997^{†}, 1998, 2003^{†}, 2004, 2010
NHL 2000s All-Decade First Team	2009
One of 100 Greatest NHL Players	2017

^{†}Shared with Mike Dunham in 1997. Tied with Roman Čechmánek and Robert Esche in 2003.

=== Nominations ===
Award	Year(s) nominated
Vezina Trophy	1997, 1998, 2001, 2003, 2004, 2006, 2007, 2008, 2010
Hart Memorial Trophy	2003, 2004, 2007

Other

Award	Year(s)
ESPY – Outstanding Performance Under Pressure	1996

== See also ==
- List of goaltenders who have scored a goal in an NHL game
- List of NHL goaltenders with 300 wins
- List of NHL players with 1,000 games played
- List of NHL statistical leaders
- New Jersey Devils notable players and award winners

Preceded by Jason Miller	New Jersey Devils first-round draft pick 1990	Succeeded by Scott Niedermayer
Preceded by Teemu Selänne	Winner of the Calder Memorial Trophy; 1994	Succeeded by Peter Forsberg
Preceded by José Théodore; Miikka Kiprusoff	Winner of the Vezina Trophy; 2003, 2004; 2007, 2008	Succeeded by Miikka Kiprusoff; Tim Thomas
Preceded by Chris Osgood, Mike Vernon Patrick Roy Tim Thomas, Manny Fernandez	Winner of the William M. Jennings Trophy; 1997, 1998 (1997: shared with Mike Dunham); 2003, 2004 (2003: tie Roman Čechmánek/Robert Esche); 2010	Succeeded by Ed Belfour, Roman Turek Miikka Kiprusoff Roberto Luongo, Cory Schneider
