= Ron Hurst (ice hockey) =

Canadian ice hockey player (1931–2026)

- Born: May 18, 1931 Toronto, Ontario, Canada
- Died: September 17, 2026 (aged 95)
- Height: 5 ft 9 in (175 cm)
- Weight: 175 lb (79 kg; 12 st 7 lb)
- Position: Right wing
- Shot: Right
- Played for: Toronto Maple Leafs
- Playing career: 1951–1960

Ronald Hurst (May 18, 1931 – September 17, 2026) was a Canadian professional ice hockey player who played 64 games in the National Hockey League (NHL) with the Toronto Maple Leafs during the 1955–56 and 1956–57 seasons.

== Playing career ==
After nine seasons in junior and the minors, Hurst made his NHL debut with Toronto on November 16, 1955, scoring a goal on Montreal Canadiens Hall of Famer Jacques Plante. That season he played 50 games with the Maple Leafs, notching seven goals and five assists. He added two assists in three playoff games. The next season, he played 14 more games for Toronto with two more goals and two more assists. The rest of his career, which lasted until 1960, was in the minors.

== Personal life and death ==
Hurst died on September 17, 2026, at the age of 95. At the time of this death, Hurst was the oldest living Maple Leaf. His brother was Kitchener-Waterloo Dutchmen defenceman Art Hurst.

== Career statistics ==
=== Regular season and playoffs ===
			Regular season					Playoffs
Season	Team	League	GP	G	A	Pts	PIM	GP	G	A	Pts	PIM
1946–47	Toronto Young Rangers	OHA	1	0	0	0	0	—	—	—	—	—
1948–49	Toronto Marlboros	OHA-B	13	8	4	12	23	1	1	2	3	2
1948–49	Toronto Marlboros	OHA	—	—	—	—	—	9	3	8	11	7
1949–50	Toronto Marlboros	OHA	48	13	12	25	74	5	2	4	6	12
1950–51	Toronto Marlboros	OHA	51	15	13	28	127	12	8	3	11	36
1951–52	Saint John Beavers	MMHL	63	17	25	42	51	10	2	1	3	24
1952–53	Ottawa Senators	QSHL	8	2	1	3	4	—	—	—	—	—
1952–53	Charlottetown Islanders	MMHL	70	23	21	44	104	—	—	—	—	—
1953–54	Soo Greyhounds	NOHA	53	11	30	41	63	9	4	5	9	8
1954–55	Soo Greyhounds	NOHA	57	24	29	53	60	14	5	4	9	29
1955–56	Toronto Maple Leafs	NHL	50	7	5	12	62	3	0	2	2	4
1955–56	Pittsburgh Hornets	AHL	13	7	8	15	44	—	—	—	—	—
1956–57	Toronto Maple Leafs	NHL	14	2	2	4	8	—	—	—	—	—
1956–57	Rochester Americans	AHL	26	7	16	23	58	10	1	4	5	20
1957–58	Rochester Americans	AHL	59	12	22	34	120	—	—	—	—	—
1958–59	Hershey Bears	AHL	19	2	8	10	47	—	—	—	—	—
1959–60	Hershey Bears	AHL	43	7	7	14	175	—	—	—	—	—
AHL totals			160	35	61	96	444	10	1	4	5	20
NHL totals			64	9	7	16	70	3	0	2	2	4
