= Buddy Horne =

Canadian ice hockey player (1933–1977)

- Born: October 4, 1933 Toronto, Ontario, Canada
- Died: February 25, 1977 (aged 43) Parry Sound, Ontario, Canada
- Height: 5 ft 9 in (175 cm)
- Weight: 175 lb (79 kg; 12 st 7 lb)
- Position: Right wing
- Played for: Kitchener-Waterloo Dutchmen
- National team: Canada
- Playing career: 1954–1967

Olympic medal record

Men's Ice hockey

Representing Canada
Bronze medal – third place	1956 Cortina d'Ampezzo	Ice hockey

James Alfred "Buddy" Horne (October 4, 1933 – February 25, 1977) was a Canadian ice hockey player who competed in the 1956 Winter Olympics.

Horne was a member of the Kitchener-Waterloo Dutchmen who won the bronze medal for Canada in ice hockey at the 1956 Winter Olympics.

Horne died in Parry Sound, Ontario on February 25, 1977, at the age of 43.
