= Daniel McKinnon (ice hockey) =

American ice hockey player

Medal record

Representing United States

Men's Ice Hockey
Silver medal – second place	1956 Cortina d'Ampezzo	Team

Daniel Duncan McKinnon (21 April 1927 – 6 August 2017) was an ice hockey player who played for the American national team. He won a silver medal at the 1956 Winter Olympics. He was born in Williams, Minnesota.

McKinnon had been an All-Star while playing for the University of North Dakota hockey team following the Second World War. In 1951 McKinnon followed a group of friends to San Bernardino, California for a year. He played hockey for the San Bernardino Shamrocks and worked as a diesel engine repairman for the Atchison, Topeka and Santa Fe Railway. McKinnon's hockey career came to an end in 1958. While he was out deer hunting, his gun misfired and destroyed part of his hand, preventing him from being able to hold a hockey stick properly. He retired from the sport and joined the staff of the Marvin Window Company, for which he worked for more than two decades. McKinnon died in Warroad, Minnesota.

== Awards and honors ==
Award	Year
AHCA Second Team All-American	1949–50
