= Ken Purpur =

American ice hockey player (1932–2011)

- Born: March 1, 1932 Grand Forks, ND, USA
- Died: June 5, 2011 (aged 79) Rapid City, SD, USA
- Height: 5 ft 7 in (170 cm)
- Weight: 141 lb (64 kg; 10 st 1 lb)
- Position: Right Wing
- National team: United States
- Playing career: 1951–1956
Medal record
Representing United States
Men's Ice Hockey
Silver medal – second place	1956 Cortina d'Ampezzo	Team

Kenneth Richard Purpur (March 1, 1932 – June 5, 2011) was an ice hockey player who played for the American national team. He won a silver medal at the 1956 Winter Olympics. He is the younger brother of Fido Purpur who coached him at the University of North Dakota.
