= Art Hurst =

Canadian ice hockey player

- Born: Arthur Robert Hurst; 2 May 1923; Toronto, Canada
- Died: November 1993 (aged 70); Kitchener, Ontario, Canada
- Relatives: Ron Hurst (brother)
Ice hockey career
- Height: 178 cm (5 ft 10 in)
- Weight: 79 kg (174 lb; 12 st 6 lb)
- Position: Defense
- Played for: Sydney Navy; Toronto Bowser Orphans; Toronto Staffords; Kitchener-Waterloo Dutchmen; Stratford Indians
- National team: Canada
Medal record
Men's Ice hockey
Representing Canada
Bronze medal – third place	1956 Cortina d'Ampezzo	Ice hockey

Arthur Robert Hurst (2 May 1923, Toronto – November 1993, Kitchener) was a Canadian ice hockey player who competed in the 1956 Winter Olympics.

== Career ==
Hurst was a member of the Kitchener-Waterloo Dutchmen who won the bronze medal for Canada in ice hockey at the 1956 Winter Olympics. He played with the Dutchmen between 1949 and 1954 and again from 1956 to 1958. In between, he played with the Stratford Indians. He spent his early career with the Sydney Navy, the Toronto Bowser Orphans, and the Toronto Staffords. He retired in 1958.

His brother Ron played for the Toronto Maple Leafs.
