= Carlyn Kruger =

Canadian alpine skier (born 1936)

Carlyn Kruger (born 12 August 1936) is a Canadian former alpine skier who competed in the 1956 Winter Olympics.
