= Edward Sampson (priest) =

Edward Sampson was an Anglican priest in Ireland in the 18th century.

Sampson was born in Cork and educated at Trinity College, Dublin. He was Archdeacon of Aghadoe from 1728 to 1736.
