= Wellington Burtnett =

American ice hockey player (1930–2013)

Personal information
- Full name: Wellington Parker Burtnett
- Nickname: Wimpy
- Born: August 26, 1930 Somerville, MA, USA
- Died: August 21, 2013 (aged 82) Wilmington, MA, USA
- Height: 6 ft 0 in (1.83 m)
- Weight: 187 lb (85 kg)

Sport
- Country: United States
- Sport: Ice hockey
Medal record
Men's Ice hockey
Representing United States
Silver medal – second place	1956 Cortina d'Ampezzo	Ice hockey

Wellington Parker Burtnett, Jr. (August 26, 1930 – August 21, 2013) was an ice hockey player who played for the American national team. He won a silver medal at the 1956 Winter Olympics.

He died at his home in Wilmington, Massachusetts in 2013.

== Awards and honors ==
Award	Year
AHCA First Team All-American	1952–53
