= Ken Laufman =

Canadian ice hockey player (1934–2026)

Olympic medal record

Men's Ice hockey

Representing Canada
Bronze medal – third place	1956 Cortina d'Ampezzo	Ice hockey
Silver medal – second place	1960 Squaw Valley	Ice hockey

Kenneth Laufman (January 30, 1932 – September 14, 2026) was a Canadian ice hockey centre who competed in the 1956 Winter Olympics and 1960 Winter Olympics.

== Biography ==
Born in Hamilton, Ontario on January 30, 1932, Laufman was a member of the Kitchener-Waterloo Dutchmen who won the bronze medal for Canada in ice hockey at the 1956 Winter Olympics and the silver medal for Canada in ice hockey at the 1960 Winter Olympics.

Laufman played for the Guelph Biltmores, Halifax Atlantics, Johnstown Jets, Portland Buckaroos. Laufman played 54 games in the Ontario Hockey Association, 132 games in the Eastern Hockey League and 83 games in the Western Hockey League.

Laufman died on September 14, 2026, at the age of 94.
