= Bill Colvin =

Canadian ice hockey player

- Born: December 3, 1934; Toronto, Ontario, Canada
- Died: November 3, 2010 (aged 75)
- Height: 5 ft 10 in (178 cm)
- Weight: 165 lb (75 kg; 11 st 11 lb)
- Position: Centre
- Shot: Left
- Played for: Toledo Mercurys
- National team: Canada
- Playing career: 1956–1962

Olympic medal record

Men's Ice hockey

Representing Canada
Bronze medal – third place	1956 Cortina d'Ampezzo	Ice hockey

William Norman Colvin (December 3, 1934 – November 3, 2010) was a Canadian ice hockey player who competed in the 1956 Winter Olympics.

Colvin was a member of the Kitchener-Waterloo Dutchmen who won the bronze medal for Canada in ice hockey at the 1956 Winter Olympics.

Following his hockey playing days, Colvin, who had been a teacher, then became a lawyer and practiced law for over 30 years.
