= Apollonio Stadium =

Sports venue in Cortina d'Ampezzo, Italy

Coordinates: 46.534761°N 12.136866°E

Apollonio Stadium (Stadio Apollonio) is a sports venue located in Cortina d'Ampezzo, Italy. As the "Romano and Armando Apollonio Stadium", it was used as a subsidiary rink to the Olympic Ice Stadium to host some of the ice hockey events for the 1956 Winter Olympics.

The rink was originally 47 m x 85 m, but was increased to 62.5 m x 85 m in order to accommodate two rinks for two competitions to be played at the same time. Originally seated for 1,000 spectators, it was expanded to 2,000 for the games. Today, the venue is primarily used for tennis.
