= Viktor Nikiforov =

Soviet ice hockey player

- Born: December 4, 1931 Moscow, Soviet Union
- Died: March 4, 1989 (aged 57) Moscow, Soviet Union
- Height: 6 ft 1 in (185 cm)
- Weight: 185 lb (84 kg; 13 st 3 lb)
- Position: Right Wing
- Shot: Left
- Played for: HC Spartak Moscow; CSKA Moscow; ODO Novosibirsk; Dynamo Novosibirsk; Dynamo Moscow; HC Spartak Moscow; Metallurg Stalinsk
- National team: Soviet Union
- Playing career: 1949–1960

Olympic medal record

Men's Ice hockey

Representing Soviet Union
| Gold medal – first place | 1956 Cortina d'Ampezzo | Ice hockey |

Viktor Vasilievich Nikiforov (December 4, 1931 – March 4, 1989) was a Soviet ice hockey player. He won a gold medal at the 1956 Winter Olympics. He was born in Moscow, Soviet Union.
