= Bob White (ice hockey) =

Canadian ice hockey player

Olympic medal record

Men's Ice hockey

Representing Canada
| Bronze medal – third place | 1956 Cortina d'Ampezzo | Ice hockey |

Robert Charles White (born 22 July 1935 in Stratford, Ontario) is a Canadian ice hockey player who competed in the 1956 Winter Olympics.

White was a member of the Kitchener-Waterloo Dutchmen who won the bronze medal for Canada in ice hockey at the 1956 Winter Olympics. He won the 1955 Allen Cup (All-Canada Senior Champions) with the Dutchmen, the 1953 Memorial Cup (All-Canada Junior Champions) with the Barrie Flyers, and was a two-time All-American and Assistant Captain at the University of Michigan (1957–58, 1958–59)

== Awards and honours ==
| Award | Year |
|---|---|
| AHCA West All-American | 1957–58; 1958–59 |
