= James Logan (ice hockey) =

Canadian ice hockey player

- Born: September 17, 1933 (age 93) Toronto, Ontario, Canada
- Height: 5 ft 10 in (178 cm)
- Weight: 170 lb (77 kg; 12 st 2 lb)
- Position: Centre
- Played for: Kitchener-Waterloo Dutchmen; Winnipeg Warriors; Sudbury Wolves
- National team: Canada
- Playing career: 1954–1959
Medal record
Men's Ice hockey
Representing Canada
Bronze medal – third place	1956 Cortina d'Ampezzo	Ice hockey

James "Jim" Logan (born September 17, 1933) is a Canadian ice hockey player.

== Early life ==
Logan was born in Toronto. He played junior hockey with the St. Michael's Buzzers.

== Career ==
Logan was a member of the Kitchener-Waterloo Dutchmen who won the bronze medal for Canada in ice hockey at the 1956 Winter Olympics. He was the leading scorer in the tournament with 15 points (seven goals and eight assists).

After retiring from professional hockey, Logan worked for an accounting firm in Greater Sudbury.
