= Gérard Théberge =

Canadian ice hockey player

- Born: December 18, 1930; Saint-Hyacinthe, QC, CAN
- Died: May 1, 2000 (aged 69); Waterloo, ON, CAN
- Height: 5 ft 9 in (175 cm)
- Weight: 160 lb (73 kg; 11 st 6 lb)
- Position: Left wing
- Shot: Left
- Played for: Kitchener-Waterloo Dutchmen; Woodstock Athletics
- National team: Canada
- Playing career: 1951–1962

Olympic medal record

Men's Ice hockey

Representing Canada
Bronze medal – third place	1956 Cortina d'Ampezzo	Ice hockey

Conrad Gérard Théberge (December 18, 1930– May 1, 2000) was a Canadian ice hockey player who competed in the 1956 Winter Olympics.

Théberge was a member of the Kitchener-Waterloo Dutchmen who won the bronze medal for Canada in ice hockey at the 1956 Winter Olympics.
