= Byrle Klinck =

Canadian ice hockey player

Olympic medal record

Men's Ice hockey

Representing Canada
Bronze medal – third place	1956 Cortina d'Ampezzo	Ice hockey

Wayne Melville "Byrle" Klinck (June 20, 1934 – April 15, 2016) was a Canadian ice hockey player who competed in the 1956 Winter Olympics. Klinck was a member of the Kitchener-Waterloo Dutchmen who won the bronze medal for Canada in ice hockey at the 1956 Winter Olympics.
