= Charlie Brooker (ice hockey) =

Canadian ice hockey player (1932–2020)

- Born: March 25, 1932 Toronto, Ontario, Canada
- Died: December 18, 2020 (aged 88) Meaford, Ontario, Canada
- Position: Left wing
Medal record
Men's Ice hockey
Representing Canada
Bronze medal – third place	1956 Cortina d'Ampezzo	Ice hockey

Charles Brooker (March 25, 1932 – December 18, 2020) was a Canadian ice hockey winger who competed in the 1956 Winter Olympics.

== Career ==
From 1950 to 1952, Brooker played junior hockey with the Waterloo Hurricanes of the Ontario Hockey Association. He was a member of the Kitchener-Waterloo Dutchmen, which won the bronze medal for Canada at the 1956 Winter Olympics. Brooker later worked as a player/coach for the Olympia Ice Hockey Club of Belgium during the 1966–1967 season. He also coached in Austria and for Waterloo Lutheran University. Outside of hockey, he worked as a salesman.

== Personal life ==
Brooker died on December 18, 2020, at the age of 88.
