= Floyd Martin =

Canadian ice hockey player (1929–2023)

- Born: June 26, 1929 Floradale, Ontario, Canada
- Died: June 9, 2023 (aged 93)
- Height: 5 ft 10 in (178 cm)
- Weight: 180 lb (82 kg; 12 st 12 lb)
- Position: Right wing
- Shot: Left
- Played for: Kitchener-Waterloo Dutchmen; Elmira Polar Kings; Galt Terriers; Johnstown Jets; Pittsburgh Hornets; Windsor Bulldogs; Guelph Mercurys
- National team: Canada
- Playing career: 1949–1969

Olympic medal record

Men's Ice hockey

Representing Canada
Bronze medal – third place	1956 Cortina d'Ampezzo	Ice hockey
Silver medal – second place	1960 Squaw Valley	Ice hockey

Floyd Gingrich "Butch" Martin (June 26, 1929 – June 9, 2023) was a Canadian ice hockey player who competed in the 1956 Winter Olympics and 1960 Winter Olympics.

Martin was a member of the Kitchener-Waterloo Dutchmen who won the bronze medal for Canada in ice hockey at the 1956 Winter Olympics and the silver medal for Canada in ice hockey at the 1960 Winter Olympics. He played for the Johnstown Jets and Pittsburgh Hornets. Martin played 205 matches in the Eastern Hockey League and 2 matches in the American Hockey League.

Martin sold cars in Waterloo after his player career was over and returned to his hometown.

Martin died on June 9, 2023, at the age of 93.
