= Paul Knox =

Canadian ice hockey player (1933–2022)

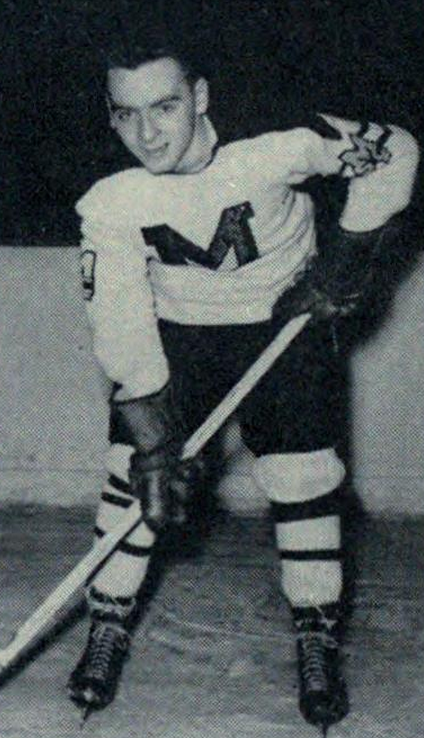
- Knox c. 1952 at St. Michaels
- Born: November 23, 1933 Toronto, Ontario, Canada
- Died: August 24, 2022 (aged 88) Southampton, Ontario, Canada
- Height: 5 ft 10 in (178 cm)
- Weight: 160 lb (73 kg; 11 st 6 lb)
- Position: Right wing
- Shot: Right
- Played for: Toronto Maple Leafs
- National team: Canada
- Playing career: 1954–1959

Olympic medal record

Men's ice hockey

Representing Canada
Bronze medal – third place	1956 Cortina d'Ampezzo	Ice hockey

Thomas Paul Patrick Knox (November 23, 1933 – August 24, 2022) was a Canadian professional ice hockey right winger who played in one National Hockey League game for the Toronto Maple Leafs during the 1954–55 season.

Knox was also a member of the Kitchener-Waterloo Dutchmen who won the bronze medal for Canada in ice hockey at the 1956 Winter Olympics. He died on August 24, 2022, at the age of 88.

== Career statistics ==
=== Regular season and playoffs ===
			Regular season					Playoffs
Season	Team	League	GP	G	A	Pts	PIM	GP	G	A	Pts	PIM
1950–51	St. Michael's Majors	OHA	2	0	0	0	0	—	—	—	—	—
1951–52	St. Michael's Majors	OHA	34	12	14	26	10	—	—	—	—	—
1952–53	St. Michael's Majors	OHA	47	21	20	41	19	17	13	7	20	2
1953–54	St. Michael's Majors	OHA	58	40	28	68	20	8	9	10	19	4
1954–55	Toronto Maple Leafs	NHL	1	0	0	0	0	—	—	—	—	—
1954–55	University of Toronto	ICHL	—	—	—	—	—	—	—	—	—	—
1955–56	Kitchener-Waterloo Dutchmen	OHA Sr	48	19	24	43	6	10	6	4	10	2
1956–57	Kitchener-Waterloo Dutchmen	OHA Sr	52	18	22	40	30	10	8	5	13	0
1956–57	Kitchener-Waterloo Dutchmen	Al-Cup	—	—	—	—	—	6	1	3	4	2
1957–58	Kitchener-Waterloo Dutchmen	NOHA	—	—	—	—	—	—	—	—	—	—
1957–58	Kitchener-Waterloo Dutchmen	Al-Cup	—	—	—	—	—	2	0	1	1	0
1958–59	Kitchener-Waterloo Dutchmen	OHA Sr	3	2	0	2	0	11	3	2	5	5
OHA Sr totals			103	39	46	85	36	31	17	11	28	7
NHL totals			1	0	0	0	0	—	—	—	—	—

=== International ===
Year	Team	Event	GP	G	A	Pts	PIM
1956	Canada	OLY	8	7	7	14	2
Senior totals			8	7	7	14	2

== See also ==
- List of players who played only one game in the NHL
