= Ginette Seguin =

Canadian alpine skier (1934–2019)

Ginette Seguin (19 April 1934 – 21 May 2019) was a Canadian alpine skier who competed in the 1956 Winter Olympics.
