= Donald Rope =

Canadian ice hockey player

- Born: February 2, 1929; Winnipeg, Manitoba, Canada
- Died: July 28, 2009 (aged 80); Cambridge, Ontario, Canada
- Height: 5 ft 10 in (178 cm)
- Weight: 155 lb (70 kg; 11 st 1 lb)
- Position: Defence
- Shot: Left
- Played for: Kitchener-Waterloo Dutchmen
- National team: Canada
- Playing career: 1952–1960

Olympic medal record

Men's Ice hockey

Representing Canada
Bronze medal – third place	1956 Cortina d'Ampezzo	Ice hockey
Silver medal – second place	1960 Squaw Valley	Ice hockey

Stephen Donald Rope (February 2, 1929 – July 28, 2009) was a Canadian ice hockey player who competed in the 1956 Winter Olympics and 1960 Winter Olympics.

Rope was a member of the Kitchener-Waterloo Dutchmen who won the bronze medal for Canada in ice hockey at the 1956 Winter Olympics and the silver medal for Canada in ice hockey at the 1960 Winter Olympics.

Outside of hockey, Rope spent a year teaching at Galt Collegiate Institute. He spent the rest of his teaching career at the Glenview Park Secondary School where he taught math and was director of athletics. He helped establish the city's minor hockey program, a tennis club, and hiking trails.

Rope died July 28, 2009 of pneumonia. After his death in 2009, admirers erected a stone monument in Cambridge's Churchill Park in Rope's honour. It stands adjacent to Duncan McIntosh Arena. It describes him as "an Olympian on the ice...an inspiration in the community."
