= John Petroske =

American ice hockey player (1934–2019)

Medal record

Representing United States

Men's Ice Hockey
Silver medal – second place	1956 Cortina d'Ampezzo	Team

John "Jack" Edward Petroske (August 6, 1934 – July 30, 2019) was an ice hockey player who played for the American national team. He won a silver medal at the 1956 Winter Olympics.

== Personal life ==
Petroske was born on August 6, 1934, in Hibbing, Minnesota. Petroske attended Assumption School, followed by attending Hibbing High School as an 8th grader. On July 28, 1956, Jack married the love of his life, Elizabeth McHardy, in Hibbing.

Petroske retired from hockey following the 1958 World Championships and returned to Hibbing to begin a long and distinguished career at Range Industrial Supply. He retired as owner of the company in 1988 after 30 successful years. Petroske was an avid outdoorsman and was a 50-year member of the famed Mississippi Hilton Hunting & Fishing Camp on Lake Winnibigoshish. Petroske died on July 30, 2019, at the age of 84 at Edgewood Healthcare in Virginia, Minnesota.

== Hockey career ==
Petroske was a member of the Hibbing High School Hockey Team starting in 8th grade and was instrumental in the team winning its first state high school hockey title as a senior in 1952. Petroske was selected to the All-Tournament Team and posted a tournament-best 11 points in 3 games. His 8 assists remained a tournament record for the next 15 years. His play in the tournament was recognized in 2019 as one of the top 100 performances in Tournament's 75-year history. Following high school, he received a scholarship to play hockey at the University of Minnesota. He was awarded the Minnesota "M" Award in 1954, 1955, 1956 and in 1957, when he served as captain and was selected Team MVP. While at the U of M in 1956, he was selected to play for the United States Olympic Hockey Team in Cortina, Italy. The team finished in 2nd place and took home a silver medal. Following graduation, Petroske was invited to be a member of the 1958 US Men's National Team at the World Championships in Oslo, Norway. The team finished in 3rd place and took home the bronze medal.

== Awards and honors ==
Award	Year
AHCA First Team All-American	1956–57
