= George Scholes =

Canadian ice hockey player

- Born: November 24, 1928 Toronto, Ontario, Canada
- Died: November 18, 2004 (aged 75) Mississauga, Ontario, Canada
- Height: 183 cm (6 ft 0 in)
- Weight: 77 kg (170 lb; 12 st 2 lb)
- Position: Left Wing
- Shoots: Left
- Played for: Toronto St. Michael's Majors (1946); Oshawa Generals (1946-48); Quebec Aces (1948-51); Moncton Hawks (1951-53); Kitchener-Waterloo Dutchmen (1953-57); Windsor Bulldogs (1957)
- National team: Canada
Medal record
Men's Ice hockey
Representing Canada
Bronze medal – third place	1956 Cortina d'Ampezzo	Ice hockey

George Francis Scholes (November 24, 1928, Toronto – November 18, 2004, Mississauga) was a Canadian ice hockey player who competed in the 1956 Winter Olympics. He played as a left winger. He went by many nicknames, such as "Caker", "Prioritizer", and "Blue Shorts". He was also known to also be a boxer and went to school in London, Ontario to study nutrition.

Scholes attended St. Michael's College School in Toronto, where he played on the Buzzers hockey team from 1943 to 1946, followed by one game with the Toronto St. Michael's Majors in 1946. He won the Allan Cup with the Kitchener-Waterloo Dutchmen in 1955, a win that led the team to be chosen as the national hockey team at the 1956 Winter Olympics. The team won the bronze medal for Canada, with Scholes playing all eight matches of the competition.
