= Grigory Mkrtychan =

Soviet and Russian ice hockey player

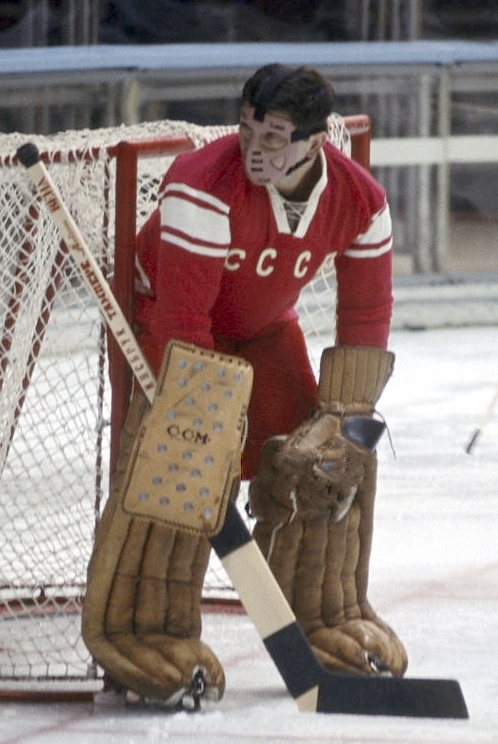
- Mkrtychan at the 1956 Olympics

Personal information
- Born: 3 January 1925 Krasnodar, Russian SFSR, Soviet Union
- Died: 14 February 2003 (aged 78) Moscow, Russia

Sport
- Sport: Ice hockey
- Club: HC CSKA Moscow
Medal record
Representing Soviet Union
Olympic Games
Gold medal – first place	1956 Cortina d'Ampezzo	Ice hockey
World Championships
Gold medal – first place	1954 Stockholm	Team
Silver medal – second place	1955 Düsseldorf	Team

Grigory Mkrtychevich Mkrtychan (Armenian: Գրիգորի Մկրտչյան, Russian: Григорий Мкртычевич Мкртычан, 3 January 1925 – 14 February 2003) was a Soviet and Russian ice hockey goalkeeper who played in the Soviet Hockey League. He won an Olympic gold medal in 1956, the world title in 1954 and 1956 (combined with Olympics), and the European title in 1954–56. In retirement he worked as a head coach of Lokomotiv Moscow in 1960–62, and later took various administrative positions with Soviet and Russian sports committees; he also served as an ice hockey referee and official. He is a member of the Russian Ice Hockey Hall of Fame.
