= Howie Lee =

Canadian ice hockey player

- Born: October 13, 1929; Toronto, Ontario, Canada
- Died: November 13, 2014 (aged 85); Markham, Ontario, Canada
- Height: 5 ft 10 in (178 cm)
- Weight: 175 lb (79 kg; 12 st 7 lb)
- Position: Defence
- Shot: Left
- Played for: Pittsburgh Hornets; Cleveland Barons; Kitchener-Waterloo Dutchmen
- National team: Canada
- Playing career: 1949–1958

Olympic medal record

Men's Ice hockey

Representing Canada
| Bronze medal – third place | 1956 Cortina d'Ampezzo | Ice hockey |

Howard Stewart Lee (October 13, 1929 – November 13, 2014) was a Canadian ice hockey player who competed in the 1956 Winter Olympics.

Lee was a member of the Kitchener-Waterloo Dutchmen who won the bronze medal for Canada in ice hockey at the 1956 Winter Olympics.
