= Keith Woodall =

Canadian ice hockey player

- Born: August 4, 1926; Elmira, Ontario, Canada
- Died: May 17, 1981 (aged 54); Halifax, Nova Scotia, Canada
- Height: 6 ft 0 in (183 cm)
- Weight: 165 lb (75 kg; 11 st 11 lb)
- Position: Goaltender
- Caught: Left
- Played for: Owen Sound Mohawks; Edmonton Flyers; Brantford Redmen; Kitchener-Waterloo Dutchmen
- National team: Canada
- Playing career: 1946–1956

Olympic medal record

Men's Ice hockey

Representing Canada
Bronze medal – third place	1956 Cortina d'Ampezzo	Ice hockey

Keith Eugene Woodall (August 4, 1926 – May 17, 1981) was a Canadian ice hockey goaltender who competed in the 1956 Winter Olympics.

Woodall was a member of the Kitchener-Waterloo Dutchmen who won the bronze medal for Canada in ice hockey at the 1956 Winter Olympics
