= Ice hockey at the 1956 Winter Olympics =

Tournament details
- Host country: Italy
- Dates: 26 January – 4 February 1956
- Teams: 10

Final positions
- Champions: Soviet Union (1st title)
- Runners-up: United States
- Third place: Canada
- Fourth place: Sweden

Tournament statistics
- Games played: 33
- Goals scored: 262 (7.94 per game)
- Attendance: 122,230 (3,704 per game)
- Scoring leader: (Canada) James Logan (15 points)

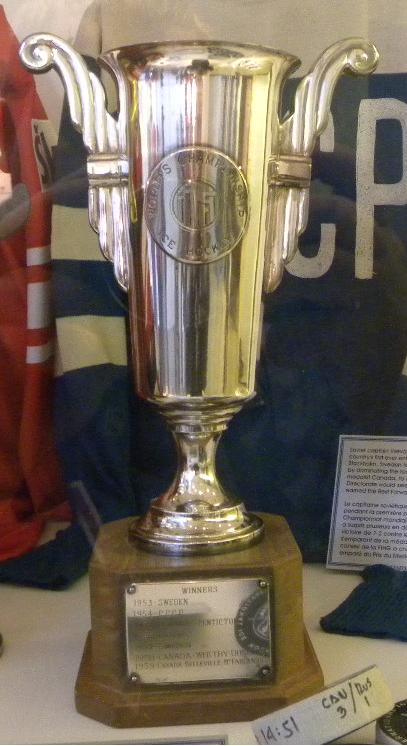
Trophy awarded for the 1956 World Championships

The men's ice hockey tournament at the 1956 Winter Olympics in Cortina d'Ampezzo, Italy, was the eighth Olympic Championship, also serving as the 23rd World Championships and the 34th European Championships. The tournament was held at the Olympic Ice Stadium and the Apollonio Stadium.

The Soviet Union won all their games to claim their first Olympic title, their second World title, and their third European title. Canada, represented by the Kitchener-Waterloo Dutchmen, won its eighth consecutive Olympic ice hockey medal, and first bronze medal.

East Germany and West Germany could not come to an agreement over how to formulate a combined team, so they played a qualification game against each other, which was won by West Germany. East Germany hosted a tournament for non-qualified teams, often referred to as World Championships Pool B, between the GDR, Norway and Belgium in Berlin.

== Medalists ==
Gold	Silver	Bronze
Soviet Union Nikolai Puchkov; Grigory Mkrtychan; Nikolaï Sologubov; Dmitry Ukolov; Ivan Tregubov; Genrikh Sidorenkov; Alfred Kuchevsky; Yevgeny Babich; Viktor Shuvalov; Vsevolod Bobrov; Yuri Krylov; Aleksandr Uvarov; Valentin Kuzin; Yuri Pantjukhov; Aleksey Guryshev; Nikolay Khlystov; Viktor Nikiforov	United States Willard Ikola; Don Rigazio; Richard Rodenheiser; Daniel McKinnon; Ed Sampson; John Matchefts; Richard Meredith; Dick Dougherty; Ken Purpur; John Mayasich; Bill Cleary; Wellington Burtnett; Wendell Anderson; Gene Campbell; Gordon Christian; Weldon Olson; John Petroske	Canada Denis Brodeur; Keith Woodall; Floyd Martin; Howie Lee; Art Hurst; Jack McKenzie; James Logan; Paul Knox; Donald Rope; Byrle Klinck; Bill Colvin; Gérard Théberge; Alfred Horne; Charlie Brooker; George Scholes; Bob White; Ken Laufman

== Participating nations ==
- Austria (17)
- Canada (16)
- Czechoslovakia (17)
- United Team of Germany (17)
- Italy (16)
- Poland (17)
- Soviet Union (17)
- Sweden (17)
- Switzerland (17)
- United States (16)

== World Championship Group A (Italy) ==
=== Qualification ===
- November 16, 1955
  - East Germany 3–7 West Germany

=== First round ===
Top two teams (shaded ones) from each group earned a right to play for 1st–6th places.

==== Group A ====
Pos	Team	Pld	W	L	D	GF	GA	GD	Pts
1	Canada	3	3	0	0	30	1	+29	6
2	Germany	3	1	1	1	9	6	+3	3
3	Italy	3	0	1	2	5	7	−2	2
4	Austria	3	0	2	1	2	32	−30	1

Source: HockeyCanada.ca
- January 26
  - Canada 4–0 Germany (UTG)
  - Italy 2–2 Austria
- January 27
  - Italy 2–2 Germany (UTG)
  - Canada 23–0 Austria
- January 28
  - Germany (UTG) 7–0 Austria
  - Italy 1–3 Canada

==== Group B ====
Pos	Team	Pld	W	L	D	GF	GA	GD	Pts
1	Czechoslovakia	2	2	0	0	12	6	+6	4
2	United States	2	1	1	0	7	4	+3	2
3	Poland	2	0	2	0	3	12	−9	0

Source: HockeyCanada.ca
- January 27
  - Czechoslovakia 4–3 USA
- January 28
  - USA 4–0 Poland
- January 29
  - Czechoslovakia 8–3 Poland

==== Group C ====
Pos	Team	Pld	W	L	D	GF	GA	GD	Pts
1	Soviet Union	2	2	0	0	15	4	+11	4
2	Sweden	2	1	1	0	7	10	−3	2
3	Switzerland	2	0	2	0	8	16	−8	0

Source: HockeyCanada.ca
- January 27
  - USSR 5–1 Sweden
- January 28
  - Sweden 6–5 Switzerland
- January 29
  - USSR 10–3 Switzerland

=== Final round ===
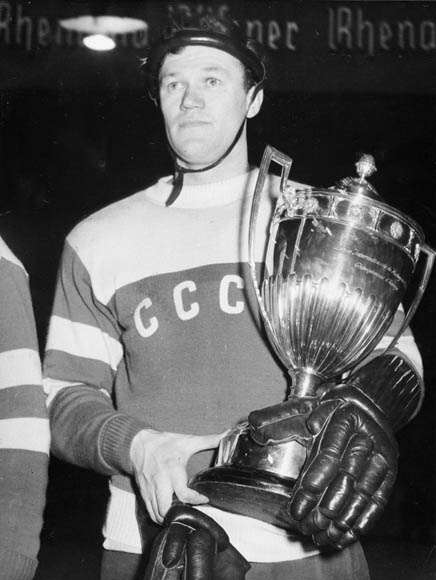
Vsevolod Bobrov holding the championship trophy.

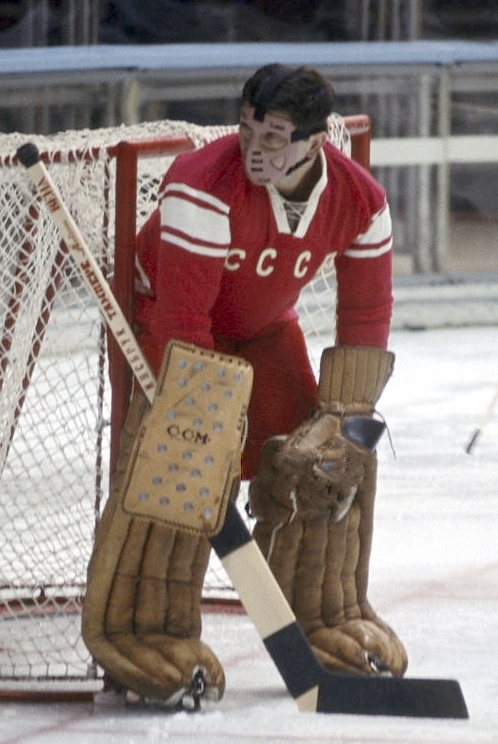
The goalkeeper of the Soviet ice hockey team Grigory Mkrtychan waiting in front of the goal post during the VII Olympic Winter Games. Cortina d'Ampezzo, 1956

The first place team, the Soviet Union, won the gold medal; the silver medal was won by the United States, and the bronze medal was won by Canada.

Coming into the final game of the tournament (Soviet Union vs Canada), the Soviets and Americans both had eight points while Canada had six points. A Canadian win would have created a three-way tie at eight points, to be broken by goal ratio. Canada (23/9=2.556) needed a victory by three or more to pass the Soviets (23/5=4.600). The Soviets would remain ahead of Canada with a win, a draw, or a loss by one or two.

The Americans (26/12=2.167) still had a chance at all three medal places due to the possibility of the goal ratios of Canada and/or the Soviets being altered according to the score of the final game.

Pos	Team	Pld	W	L	D	GF	GA	GD	Pts
1	Soviet Union	5	5	0	0	25	5	+20	10
2	United States	5	4	1	0	26	12	+14	8
3	Canada	5	3	2	0	23	11	+12	6
4	Sweden	5	1	3	1	10	17	−7	3
5	Czechoslovakia	5	1	4	0	20	30	−10	2
6	Germany	5	0	4	1	6	35	−29	1

Source: HockeyCanada.ca
- January 30
  - USA 7–2 Germany (UTG)
  - Canada 6–3 Czechoslovakia
  - USSR 4–1 Sweden
- January 31
  - USSR 8–0 Germany (UTG)
  - Sweden 5–0 Czechoslovakia
  - USA 4–1 Canada
- February 1
  - USA 6–1 Sweden
- February 2
  - Canada 10–0 Germany (UTG)
  - USSR 7–4 Czechoslovakia
- February 3
  - Czechoslovakia 9–3 Germany (UTG)
  - Canada 6–2 Sweden
  - USSR 4–0 USA
- February 4
  - USSR 2–0 Canada
  - Germany (UTG) 1–1 Sweden
  - USA 9–4 Czechoslovakia

=== Consolation round ===
Pos	Team	Pld	W	L	D	GF	GA	GD	Pts
7	Italy	3	3	0	0	21	7	+14	6
8	Poland	3	2	1	0	12	10	+2	4
9	Switzerland	3	1	2	0	12	18	−6	2
10	Austria	3	0	3	0	9	19	−10	0

Source: HockeyCanada.ca
- January 31
  - Switzerland 7–4 Austria
- February 1
  - Poland 6–2 Switzerland
  - Italy 8–2 Austria
- February 2
  - Italy 8–3 Switzerland
  - Poland 4–3 Austria
- February 3
  - Italy 5–2 Poland

== World Championship Group B (East Germany) ==
=== Final Round ===
Pos	Team	Pld	W	L	D	GF	GA	GD	Pts
11	East Germany	2	2	0	0	18	8	+10	4
12	Norway	2	1	1	0	8	9	−1	2
13	Belgium	2	0	2	0	12	21	−9	0

Source: HockeyCanada.ca
- March 8
  - East Germany 4–1 Norway
- March 9
  - East Germany 14–7 Belgium
- March 10
  - Norway 7–5 Belgium

== Statistics ==
=== Average age ===
Gold medalists Team USSR was the oldest team in the tournament, averaging 29 years and 11 months. Team USA was the youngest team in the tournament, averaging 22 years and 5 months. Tournament average was 26 years and 7 months.

=== Leading scorers ===
Rk	Team	GP	G	A	Pts
1	(Canada) James Logan	8	7	8	15
2	(Canada) Paul Knox	8	7	7	14
3	(Soviet Union) Vsevolod Bobrov	7	9	3	12
4	(Canada) Jack McKenzie	8	7	5	12
5	(Canada) Gerry Theberge	8	9	2	11
6	(Soviet Union) Alexei Guryshev	7	8	3	11
7	(United States) John Mayasich	7	6	4	10
8	(Canada) George Scholes	8	5	5	10
9	(Canada) Ken Laufman	8	1	8	9
10	(United States) Gordon Christian	6	5	3	8

=== Tournament awards ===
- Best players selected by the directorate:
  - Best Goaltender: (United States) Willard Ikola
  - Best Defenceman: (Soviet Union) Nikolai Sologubov
  - Best Forward: (Canada) Jack McKenzie

== Final ranking ==
1. Soviet Union
2. United States
3. Canada
4. Sweden
5. Czechoslovakia
6. Germany
7. Italy
8. Poland
9. Switzerland
10. Austria

== European Championship final ranking ==
1. Soviet Union
2. Sweden
3. Czechoslovakia
4. West Germany
5. Italy
6. Poland
7. Switzerland
8. Austria
