= Ed Sampson =

American ice hockey player

Medal record

Representing United States

Men's Ice Hockey
Silver medal – second place	1956 Cortina d'Ampezzo	Team

Edward Horace Sampson (December 21, 1921 in Fort Frances, Ontario – August 26, 1974) was an ice hockey player who played for the American national team. He won a silver medal at the 1956 Winter Olympics.
