= Jack McKenzie (ice hockey) =

Canadian ice hockey player

Olympic medal record

Representing Canada

Men's Ice hockey

Olympic Games
Bronze medal – third place	1956 Cortina d'Ampezzo	Team competition

John William "Jack" McKenzie (born July 22, 1930) is a Canadian retired ice hockey player who competed in the 1956 Winter Olympics. McKenzie was a member of the Kitchener-Waterloo Dutchmen who won the bronze medal for Canada in ice hockey at the 1956 Winter Olympics. He played in eight matches and scored seven goals.
