= Denis Brodeur =

Canadian photographer and athlete

Personal information
- Born: October 12, 1930 Montreal, Quebec, Canada
- Died: September 26, 2013 (aged 82) Montreal, Quebec, Canada

Sport
- Sport: Professional hockey
Medal record
Representing Canada
Ice hockey
Olympic Games/World Championship
Bronze medal – third place	1956 Cortina D'Ampezzo

Denis Joseph Germain Stanislaus Brodeur (October 12, 1930 – September 26, 2013) was a Canadian photographer, acknowledged as one of hockey's finest photographers and was the father of New Jersey Devils goaltender Martin Brodeur, the National Hockey League's winningest goaltender. He was the official photographer for the Montreal Canadiens for many years, and co-published a book entitled Goalies: Guardians of the Net in 1996, which features his son Martin on the front cover.

Like his son, Denis was also considered an outstanding goaltender, and helped team Canada win the bronze medal at the 1956 Olympic Games in Cortina D'Ampezzo, Italy.

In November 2006 the National Hockey League acquired Brodeur's photography work, which consisted of over 110,000 images from 40 years. Some of the legendary names included in this collection are the brothers Phil and Tony Esposito, Jean Béliveau, Gordie Howe, Wayne Gretzky, Mario Lemieux and Bobby Orr. He also captured many famous events and landmarks, from the nasty Boston-Montreal rivalry of the 1970s right on up through the Devils' first Stanley Cup in 1995. His image was featured on a hockey card for the 2004–2005 Upper Deck Series One Hockey.

== Personal ==
With his wife Mireille, Denis had three sons—Denis Jr., Claude, Martin—and two daughters—Line and Sylvie. Claude was a baseball pitcher in the Montreal Expos farm system.

On September 26, 2013, Brodeur died at age 82.
