= Berlin Dutchmen =

Canadian former professional ice hockey team

- City: Berlin, Ontario, Canada
- League: Ontario Professional Hockey League
- Founded: 1908
- Operated: 1908-1911
- Home arena: Queen Street Auditorium
- Colours: Green, white
- Head coach: George Boehmer, 1908; Hugh Lehman, 1910

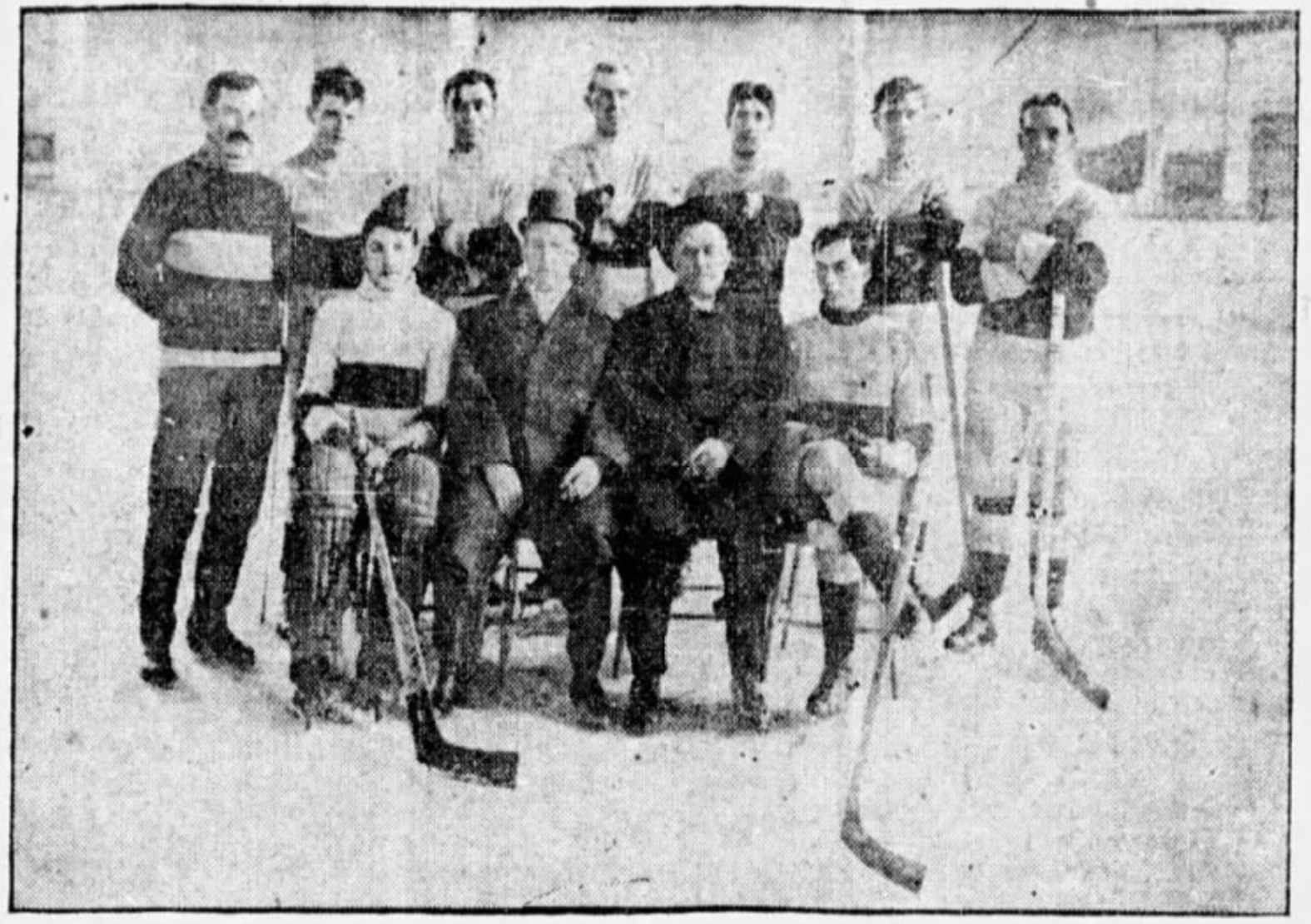
Berlin Dutchmen in 1909–10. Hugh Lehman seated front left.

The Berlin Dutchmen were an early Canadian professional ice hockey team operating out of Berlin, Ontario, (renamed Kitchener in 1916) from 1907 in the Ontario Professional Hockey League (OPHL). The Berlin team is notable for challenging the Stanley Cup in 1910 versus the Montreal Wanderers. The dormant team was revived in 1926 as the Kitchener Dutchmen of the Canadian Professional Hockey League. The dormant name was revived in 1947 as the senior Kitchener-Waterloo Dutchmen, notable for winning Canada a bronze medal at the 1956 Olympics and a silver medal at the 1960 Olympics. The minor junior Kitchener Dutchmen continue the name today.

== Etymology ==
"Dutchman" is a misnomer from Deutsch (German) for a Germanic person. This is even more so for Waterloo County, Ontario, as many of the earliest settlers were so-called "Pennsylvania Dutch".

== History ==
The Dutchmen were one of the founding teams of the OPHL in 1907. Starting play in January 1908, the club would be a member of the OPHL until 1911. The club would win the OPHL championship once, in 1910, giving the team a chance to challenge for the Stanley Cup, then the Canadian professional championship trophy. Berlin played in Montreal against the Wanderers and were defeated 7–3. The OPHL would only survive for only one more year before folding.

== Kitchener-Waterloo Dutchmen ==
The name was revived in 1927 as the Kitchener Dutchmen, a professional team in the Canadian Professional Hockey League (which became the International Hockey League). In 1929, the franchise was moved to Cleveland, Ohio, becoming the Cleveland Indians and eventually the Cleveland Barons of the American Hockey League.

The name was revived again in 1947 as the Kitchener-Waterloo Dutchmen. This senior amateur ice hockey team represented Canada at the 1956 and 1960 Winter Olympics. The team qualified to represent Canada in Italy after beating the Fort William Beavers 4-1 to win the 1956 Allan Cup. They captured a bronze medal placing behind Russian and the United States. They competed in the Olympics in 1960 after the Whitby Dunlops, who won the 1959 Allan Cup, declined to compete. The K-W Dutchmen played in the Ontario Hockey Association Senior Division from 1947 until 1963.

The Senior Division Dutchmen won the Allan Cup in 1955 and 1957, the national senior amateur men's ice hockey championship. These Dutchmen were the last self-contained club (compared to the later purpose built national team) to represent Canada in the Olympic hockey tournament—they were also the only club team to represent Canada at two Olympics (1956 bronze medal, 1960 silver medal).

== Notable players ==
- Hugh Lehman - in the Hockey Hall of Fame
- Jack McKenzie

== See also ==
- Canada men's national ice hockey team
- Ice hockey at the 1956 Winter Olympics
- Ice hockey at the Olympic Games
- List of Canadian national ice hockey team rosters
- Ontario Professional Hockey League

Preceded by Edmonton Mercurys	Canada men's Olympic ice hockey team 1956; 1960	Succeeded by 1963–64 Canada men's national ice hockey team
