= Alexander Ivanov =

Alexander Ivanov may refer to:

== Artists ==
- Alexander Ivanov (art collector) (born 1962), Russian art collector, art dealer and businessman
- Alexander Ivanov (singer), Belarusian-Russian singer
- Alexander Ivanov-Kramskoi (1912–1973), Russian classical guitarist
- Alexander Andreyevich Ivanov (1806–1858), Russian painter
- Alexander Gavrilovich Ivanov (1898-1984), Russian film director, director of the 1953 film The Star

== Sports men ==
- Alexander Ivanov (boxer) (born 1992), Russian boxer who competed at the 2010 Summer Youth Olympics
- Alexander Ivanov (chess player) (born 1956), Russian-born American chess player
- Aleksandr Ivanov (javelin thrower) (born 1982), Russian javelin thrower
- Aleksandr Ivanov (racewalker) (born 1993), Russian racewalker
- Alexander Ivanov (speedway rider), Russian motorcycle speedway rider who competed in the 2004 European Speedway Club Champions' Cup
- Aleksandr Ivanov (weightlifter) (born 1989), Russian weightlifter
- Aleksandr Ivanov (wrestler) (born 1951), Russian amateur Olympic wrestler
- Aleksandr Ivanov (tennis) (born 1945), Russian tennis player and coach, competed at French Championships in 1967.

=== Footballers ===
- Aleksandr Ivanov (footballer, born 1928) (1928–1997), Soviet footballer
- Oleksandr Ivanov (born 1965), Soviet and Ukrainian football player and coach
- Aleksandr Ivanov (footballer, born 1972), Russian footballer
- Aleksandr Ivanov (footballer, born 1973), Russian footballer

== Others ==
- Alexander Ivanov (TV presenter) (1936–1996), Soviet and Russian teacher, poet-parodist and host
- Alexander Ivanov, Russian official associated with the Wagner Group
