= Gimayev =

Gimayev (Russian: Гимаев) is a Tatar masculine surname, its feminine counterpart is Gimayeva. Notable people with the surname include:

- Sergei Gimayev (disambiguation), multiple people
- Irek Gimayev (born 1957), Soviet ice hockey player
