= The Secret of the Iron Door =

The Secret of the Iron Door (Тайна железной двери)
- Directed by: Mikhail Yuzovsky
- Written by: Alexander Rejzhevsky; Yuri Tomin
- Produced by: Alexander Kazachkov
- Starring: Evaldas Mikaliunas; Alisa Freindlich; Oleg Tabakov
- Cinematography: Vitaly Grishin
- Edited by: Yanina Bogolepova
- Music by: Vadim Gamaleya
- Production company: Gorky Film Studio
- Release date: 1970
- Running time: 69 minutes
- Country: Soviet Union
- Language: Russian

The Secret of the Iron Door (Russian: Тайна железной двери, translit. Tayna zheleznoy dveri) is a 1970 Soviet children's film directed by Mikhail Yuzovsky after a screenplay by Aleksandr Rejzhevsky loosely based on a story Wizard Walked Through the City by Yuri Tomin. It was produced by Gorky Film Studio.

== Plot summary ==
Fourth-grader Tolik Ryzhkov (Evaldas Mikaliunas), a mischievous boy and habitual fibber, stumbles upon a box of magical matches while hiding in a transformer booth. Each match, when broken, acts like a one-use magic wand, granting the wielder's wish. Initially, Tolik uses the matches for selfish desires, leading to strained relationships with his friends, particularly Mishka. However, after reconciling, he shares the matches with Mishka, who uses them selflessly to help others. This angers the matches' original owner, a young wizard (Sergei Yevsyunin) who had used a similar box to create an isolated island where he rules over a world centered entirely on himself.

The wizard abducts Tolik, Mishka, Mishka's brother, and their dog, imprisoning the others and attempting to corrupt Tolik into becoming like him. On the island, Tolik discovers that true strength lies not in magic but in loyalty and courage. Defying the wizard's manipulations, Tolik rescues his friends through cleverness and teamwork, without relying on magic. In a final act of selflessness, Tolik destroys the last magical match, renouncing its power and breaking the wizard’s hold. Returning to the real world, Tolik finds that the good deeds done for others with the matches remain intact, affirming the value of kindness and friendship.

== Cast ==
- Evaldas Mikaliunas as Tolik (boy)
- Andrei Kharybin as Mishka (boy)
- Dmitri Yuzovsky as Mitka (boy)
- Sergei Yevsyunin as Wizard (boy)
- Alisa Freindlich as Tolik's mother
- Oleg Tabakov as Tolik's father
- Saveli Kramarov as guitar player Zaytsev / Pigeon
- Yuri Uspensky as Robot Balbes
- Alexander Ivanov as traffic policeman
- Gerasim Voronkov as violinist Leonid
- Vyacheslav Tsyupa as Chicha

=== Supporting cast ===
- Vladimir Brezhnev, Valeri Fomenkov, Svetlana Galkina
- Tatyana Grishina, Anatoli Ivanov, Eduard Ivanov
- Dmitri Kitayev, Boris Mayorov, Yevgeni Mayorov
- Tatyana Mikhajlova, Vladimir Popkov, Nikolai Sologubov
- Svetlana Starikova, Georgi Svetlani

== Crew ==
- Cinematography by Vitaly Grishin.
- Music by Vadim Gamaleya, lyrics by Evgeny Agranovich.
- Artists by Lyudmila Bezsmertnova, Aleksander Vagichev.
- Editing by Yanina Bogolepova.
- Costumes by M. Tomashevskaya.

== Trivia ==
After transforming back from pigeon into Zaytsev Saveli Kramarov appears nude in the end of the film.
