= Vitali Kravtsov =

Russian ice hockey player (born 1999)

- Born: 23 December 1999 (age 26) Vladivostok, Russia
- Height: 6 ft 3 in (191 cm)
- Weight: 186 lb (84 kg; 13 st 4 lb)
- Position: Right wing
- Shoots: Left
- KHL team Former teams: Traktor Chelyabinsk; New York Rangers; Vancouver Canucks
- NHL draft: 9th overall, 2018; New York Rangers
- Playing career: 2017–present

Vitali Yuryevich Kravtsov (Russian: Виталий Юрьевич Кравцов, IPA: [vʲɪˈtalʲɪj ˈjʉrʲjɪvʲɪtɕ ˈkraftsəf]; born 23 December 1999) is a Russian professional ice hockey winger for Traktor Chelyabinsk in the Kontinental Hockey League (KHL). He was drafted ninth overall by the New York Rangers in the 2018 NHL entry draft.

== Playing career ==
Kravtsov made his KHL debut during the 2016–17 season. During the 2018 KHL playoffs, Kravtsov tied the KHL record for most points by an 18-year-old in the postseason, and later broke it on 21 March 2018.

On 22 June 2018, Kravtsov was drafted ninth overall by the New York Rangers in the 2018 NHL entry draft. He was signed by the Rangers to a three-year, entry-level contract on 3 May 2019.

After attending the Rangers 2019 training camp, Kravtsov was assigned to make his North American debut with AHL affiliate, the Hartford Wolf Pack, to start the 2019–20 season. Registering 1 assist in 5 games, Kravtsov opted to continue his development back in Russia, securing a loan for the remainder of the season with former club, Traktor Chelyabinsk of the KHL, on 28 October 2019. Kravtsov appeared in 11 games in his return to Chelyabinsk, recording 3 points, before his loan was ended prematurely by the Rangers and he was reassigned to re-join the Wolf Pack on 13 December 2019.

On 30 August 2020, Kravtsov signed a one-year extension with Traktor Chelyabinsk. Kravtsov made his NHL debut in the Rangers' 3–2 shootout loss to the Buffalo Sabres on 3 April 2021. He scored his first NHL goal against the New Jersey Devils on 18 April 2021.

On 12 October 2021, after not making the Rangers' 2021–22 opening night roster, and being sent down to the Hartford Wolf Pack, Kravtsov refused to report to Hartford and was given permission to contact other teams to facilitate a trade. On 3 November, Kravtsov was loaned to Traktor Chelyabinsk. On 13 June 2022, he signed a one-year contract extension with the Rangers.

Having rejected a contract extension to remain with Traktor, Kravtsov opted to return to the Rangers and signed a one-year, $875,000 contract for the 2022–23 season on 12 June 2022. Unable to cement a role within the Rangers, after collecting 3 goals and 6 points through 28 appearances, on 25 February 2023, Kravtsov was traded from the Rangers to the Vancouver Canucks in exchange for Will Lockwood and a seventh round draft pick in 2026. Kravtsov played out the remainder of the season with the Canucks, registering 1 goal and 2 points in 16 games.

As an impending restricted free agent with the Canucks, on 25 May 2023, Kravtsov opted to return to Russia and rejoin Traktor Chelyabinsk of the KHL on a two-year agreement through 2025.

In the 2024–25 season, Kravtsov recorded his best professional season offensively in registering 58 points. Notching 27 goals, he led all Traktor skaters, and his 58 points were good for second on the team and tied for the sixth most in the KHL. He made 19 playoff games, scoring 7 points in helping Chelyabinsk reach the Gagarin Cup Final.

After the completion of his two-year tenure with Traktor, with his NHL rights still held by the Canucks, Kravtsov made a third return to North America in signing a one-year, two-way contract with Vancouver on 5 August 2025. Kravtsov was subsequently waived by the Canucks at the end of the preseason, cleared waivers, and was assigned to the Canucks AHL team, the Abbotsford Canucks. However, just ten games into his tenure with Abbotsford, Kravtsov was placed on waivers by Vancouver on November 4 for the purposes of terminating his contract.

== International play ==
Medal record

Representing Russia

Ice hockey

World Junior Championships
Bronze medal – third place	2019 Canada	

Kravtsov represented the Russian national junior team at the 2019 World Junior Championships in Vancouver, Canada. He ended the tournament with 6 points in 7 games, helping Russia claim the bronze medal against Swiss national junior team on 6 January 2019.

== Career statistics ==
=== Regular season and playoffs ===
			Regular season					Playoffs
Season	Team	League	GP	G	A	Pts	PIM	GP	G	A	Pts	PIM
2016–17	Chelyabinsk Polar Bears	MHL	41	13	23	36	18	5	2	4	6	0
2016–17	Traktor Chelyabinsk	KHL	3	0	0	0	0	6	1	0	1	4
2016–17	Chelmet Chelyabinsk	VHL	6	2	2	4	0	—	—	—	—	—
2017–18	Traktor Chelyabinsk	KHL	35	4	3	7	6	16	6	5	11	8
2017–18	Chelmet Chelyabinsk	VHL	9	4	3	7	4	—	—	—	—	—
2017–18	Chelyabinsk Polar Bears	MHL	1	1	2	3	0	2	1	3	4	0
2018–19	Traktor Chelyabinsk	KHL	50	8	13	21	6	4	0	2	2	0
2019–20	Hartford Wolf Pack	AHL	39	6	9	15	4	—	—	—	—	—
2019–20	Traktor Chelyabinsk	KHL	11	2	1	3	2	—	—	—	—	—
2019–20	Chelmet Chelyabinsk	VHL	3	0	2	2	0	—	—	—	—	—
2020–21	Traktor Chelyabinsk	KHL	49	16	8	24	12	5	2	2	4	0
2020–21	New York Rangers	NHL	20	2	2	4	4	—	—	—	—	—
2021–22	Traktor Chelyabinsk	KHL	19	6	7	13	0	15	7	3	10	2
2022–23	New York Rangers	NHL	28	3	3	6	6	—	—	—	—	—
2022–23	Vancouver Canucks	NHL	16	1	1	2	4	—	—	—	—	—
2023–24	Traktor Chelyabinsk	KHL	55	18	16	34	16	14	3	2	5	5
2024–25	Traktor Chelyabinsk	KHL	66	27	31	58	4	19	6	1	7	2
2025–26	Abbotsford Canucks	AHL	10	1	3	4	0	—	—	—	—	—
2025–26	Traktor Chelyabinsk	KHL	42	14	23	37	6	4	2	1	3	0
KHL totals			330	95	101	196	52	83	27	16	43	21
NHL totals			64	6	6	12	14	—	—	—	—	—

=== International ===
Year	Team	Event	Result	GP	G	A	Pts	PIM
2019	Russia	WJC	3rd place, bronze medalist(s)	7	2	4	6	6
Junior totals				7	2	4	6	6

Awards and achievements
Preceded by Filip Chytil	New York Rangers first-round draft pick 2018	Succeeded by K'Andre Miller
