= Seglin =

Seglin or Seglins is a surname. Notable people with the surname include:

== Seglin ==
- Anatoly Seglin (1922–2009), Soviet association football player and ice hockey player
- Jeffrey L. Seglin (born 1956), American columnist, author, and teacher

== Seglins ==
- Dave Seglins (fl. from 2005), Canadian investigative journalist
