= Valeri Nikitin =

Valeri Nikitin may refer to:

- Valeri Nikitin (wrestler) (born 1969), Estonian wrestler
- Valeri Nikitin (ice hockey) (1939–2002), ice hockey player
