= A Rogue's Saga =

- Russian: Прохиндиада, или Бег на месте
- Directed by: Viktor Tregubovich
- Written by: Anatoli Grebnev
- Starring: Aleksandr Kalyagin; Lyudmila Gurchenko; Tatyana Dogileva; Irina Dymchenko; Viktor Zozulin
- Cinematography: Valeri Myulgaut
- Edited by: Margarita Shadrina
- Music by: Alexey Rybnikov
- Production company: Lenfilm
- Release date: 1984
- Running time: 85 minutes
- Country: Soviet Union
- Language: Russian

A Rogue's Saga (Russian: Прохиндиада, или Бег на месте, romanized: Prokhindiada, ili Beg na meste) is a 1984 Soviet comedy film directed by Viktor Tregubovich.

The film tells about an unusual employee of the research institute San Sanych Lyubomudrov, an extraordinary person who knows better than others how to communicate with unnecessary people.

== Plot ==
San Sanych Lyubomudrov is skilled at making connections and securing resources during a time of scarcity through befriend others. Lyubomudrov’s life revolves around building networks, maintaining a public image, and achieving success, all while living lavishly, beyond the lifestyle his salary from his regular employment can afford him.

In an effort to secure a prosperous future for his daughter, Lyubomudrov borrows money from an underground dealer to fund an extravagant wedding. However, his daughter opposes the wedding and ultimately decides not to marry, leaving Lyubomudrov in a difficult predicament. Meanwhile, his relationship with a new supervisor who values a different ethos adds to his challenges at work, where he often appears absent yet effectively meets his responsibilities. Eventually, entangled in financial trouble due to mounting debts, Lyubomudrov begins to realize just how deeply he is ensnared in his own web of connections.

== Cast ==
- Aleksandr Kalyagin as San Sanych Lyubomudrov
- Lyudmila Gurchenko as Ekaterina Ivanovna
- Tatyana Dogileva as Marina
- Irina Dymchenko as Natasha
- Viktor Zozulin as Viktor Viktorovich
- Igor Gorbachyov as Mikhail Mikhailovich
- Vladimir Soshalsky as Timofei Timofeevich
- Yury Kuznetsov as Volodya
- Nikolai Ispolatov as Platon
- Igor Nefyodov as Slavik
- Valentin Smirnitsky as Oleg Arbatov
- Aleksei Zharkov as Kolya, waiter
- Anatoly Ravikovich as toastmaster at a wedding
- Alexander Ivanov as cameo
