= Fomenkov =

Fomenkov (masculine, Russian: Фоменков) or Fomenkova (feminine, Russian: Фоменкова) is a Russian surname. Notable people with the surname include:

- Alexey Fomenkov (born 1991), Russian paralympic swimmer
- Valeri Fomenkov (1938–2021), Russian ice hockey player
