= Volchenkov =

Volchenkov is a surname. Notable people with the surname include:

- Aleksey Volchenkov (1953–2011), Soviet hockey player
- Anton Volchenkov (born 1982), Russian hockey player, son of Aleksey
