= Petelin =

Petelin is a Slovene language surname from a nickname meaning "rooster" in Slovene. Notable people with the surname include:

- Boris Petelin (1924–1990), Soviet ice hockey player
- Dmitry Petelin (1983), Russian cosmonaut
- Jan Petelin (1996), Luxembourgish cyclist
