= Maxim Shabanov =

Russian ice hockey player (born 2000)

- Born: 7 October 2000 (age 25) Chelyabinsk, Russia
- Height: 5 ft 9 in (175 cm)
- Weight: 167 lb (76 kg; 11 st 13 lb)
- Position: Forward
- Shoots: Left
- NHL team Former teams: Minnesota Wild; Traktor Chelyabinsk; New York Islanders
- NHL draft: Undrafted
- Playing career: 2019–present

Maxim Shabanov (born 7 October 2000) is a Russian professional ice hockey player who is a forward for the Minnesota Wild of the National Hockey League (NHL).

== Playing career ==
As a youth, Shabanov played and developed within hometown club, Traktor Chelyabinsk of the Kontinental Hockey League (KHL). Emerging as an offensively gifted forward despite his diminutive size, Shabanov made his professional debut with Chelmet Chelyabinsk in the Supreme Hockey League (VHL) in the 2019–20 season before making his KHL debut with Traktor during the 2021–22 season.

Shabanov established himself as a top-line fixture amongst Traktor's forward group and was named to the KHL All-Star Game in 2023 and 2025.

On 2 July 2025, as an undrafted free agent, Shabanov was signed to a one-year, entry-level contract with the New York Islanders for the 2025–26 season. Making the opening night roster in his debut North American season, Shabanov recorded a goal in the NHL debut against the Pittsburgh Penguins on 9 October 2025. Used in a variety of roles in his rookie season, Shabanov featured in 44 games and posted 5 goals and 18 assists for 23 points.

As a pending restricted free agent, Shabanov was not tendered a qualifying offer by the Islanders, ending his tenure with the club. On 2 July 2026, Shabanov was signed to a one-year, $1.6 million deal with the Minnesota Wild for the 2026–27 season.

== Career statistics ==
=== Regular season and playoffs ===
			Regular season					Playoffs
Season	Team	League	GP	G	A	Pts	PIM	GP	G	A	Pts	PIM
2017–18	Belye Medvedi	MHL	44	10	12	22	14	8	2	2	4	2
2018–19	Belye Medvedi	MHL	60	18	28	46	29	3	1	0	1	0
2019–20	Belye Medvedi	MHL	23	12	16	28	8	5	1	3	4	0
2019–20	Chelmet Chelyabinsk	VHL	38	2	8	10	6	—	—	—	—	—
2020–21	Belye Medvedi	MHL	17	10	12	22	2	1	0	0	0	2
2020–21	Chelmet Chelyabinsk	VHL	33	9	13	22	12	5	0	1	1	2
2021–22	Chelmet Chelyabinsk	VHL	35	11	24	35	4	6	3	2	5	0
2021–22	Traktor Chelyabinsk	KHL	11	1	1	2	2	1	0	0	0	0
2022–23	Traktor Chelyabinsk	KHL	67	18	13	31	2	—	—	—	—	—
2023–24	Traktor Chelyabinsk	KHL	64	25	25	50	4	14	3	8	11	2
2024–25	Traktor Chelyabinsk	KHL	65	23	44	67	18	21	10	10	20	2
2025–26	New York Islanders	NHL	44	5	13	18	2	—	—	—	—	—
KHL totals			207	67	83	150	26	36	13	18	31	4
NHL totals			44	5	13	18	2	—	—	—	—	—

=== International ===
Year	Team	Event	Result	GP	G	A	Pts	PIM
2016	Russia	U17	3rd place, bronze medalist(s)	6	0	0	0	0
2017	Russia	IH18	4th	5	1	0	1	0
Junior totals				11	1	0	1	0
