= Anton Glinkin =

Russian ice hockey player (born 1988)

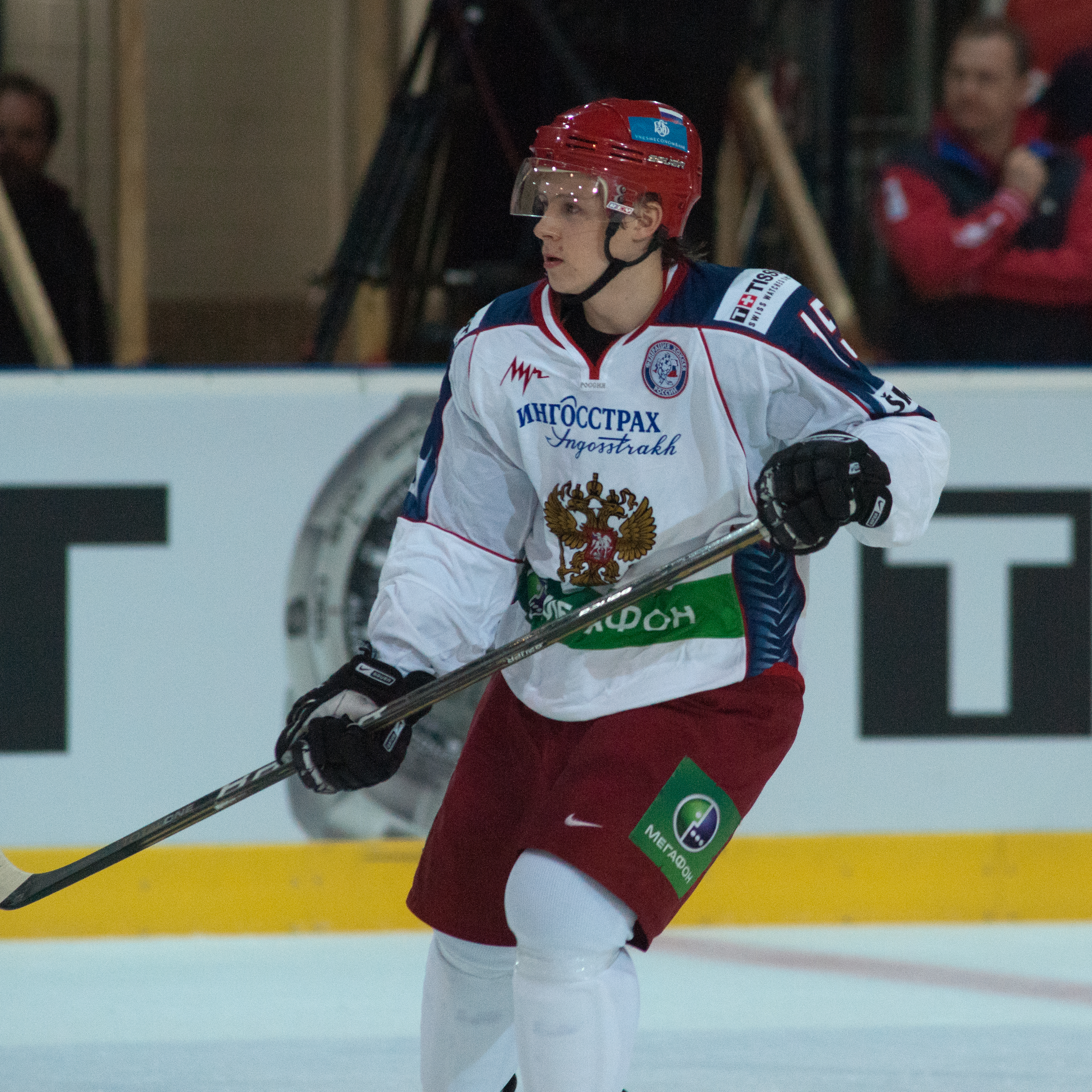
- Born: 28 October 1988 (age 37) Chelyabinsk, Russian SFSR
- Height: 5 ft 8 in (173 cm)
- Weight: 165 lb (75 kg; 11 st 11 lb)
- Position: Forward
- Shot: Right
- Played for: Traktor Chelyabinsk; Ak Bars Kazan; Kunlun Red Star
- Playing career: 2007–2021

Anton Glinkin (born 28 October 1988) is a Russian former professional ice hockey forward. He most recently played for HC Kunlun Red Star of the Kontinental Hockey League (KHL). He has formerly played with Traktor Chelyabinsk and Ak Bars Kazan.

He announced his retirement in December 2021.

== Awards and honours ==
Award	Year
KHL
Gagarin Cup (Ak Bars Kazan)	2018
