= Tsyplakov =

Tsyplakov or Tsiplakov (Russian: Цыплаков) is family name of Slavic origin. It may refer to:

- Daniil Tsyplakov (born 1992), Russian high jumper
- Maxim Tsyplakov (born 1998), Russian ice hockey player
- Victor Tsyplakov (born 1937), Russian ice hockey player
- Victor Tsiplakov (1915–1986), Russian soviet painter (see ru:Цыплаков, Виктор Григорьевич)
- Vladimir Tsyplakov (1969–2019), Belarusian ice hockey player
- Ksenia Tsyplakova (born 1990), Russian luger and finalist at the FIL World Luge Championships 2011
- Yelena Tsyplakova (born 1958), Russian actress and director and People's Artist of Russia (see ru:Цыплакова, Елена Октябревна)
