= Konstantin Astrakhantsev =

Russian ice hockey player (born 1967)

- Born: January 21, 1967 (age 58); Glazov, Soviet Union
- Height: 6 ft 0 in (183 cm)
- Weight: 209 lb (95 kg; 14 st 13 lb)
- Position: Right wing
- Shot: Left
- Played for: HC Izhstal; Traktor Chelyabinsk; KalPa; RoKi-79; Et-Po 72
- National team: Russia
- Playing career: 1983–2004

Konstantin Veniaminovich Astrakhantsev (Russian: Константин Вениаминович Астраханцев; born January 21, 1967, in Glazov, Russia) is a retired ice hockey player who played in the Soviet Hockey League. He played for Traktor Chelyabinsk. He was inducted into the Russian and Soviet Hockey Hall of Fame in 1993.

== Career statistics ==
			Regular season					Playoffs
Season	Team	League	GP	G	A	Pts	PIM	GP	G	A	Pts	PIM
1983–84	Izhstal Izhevsk	USSR	4	0	0	0	0	—	—	—	—	—
1984–85	Izhstal Izhevsk	USSR	27	2	1	3	2	—	—	—	—	—
1985–86	Izhstal Izhevsk	USSR	20	2	4	6	4	—	—	—	—	—
1986–87	Izhstal Izhevsk	USSR-2	14	3	0	3	10	—	—	—	—	—
1988–89	Traktor Chelyabinsk	USSR	28	6	4	10	16	—	—	—	—	—
1991–92	Traktor Chelyabinsk	CIS	35	17	16	33	12	—	—	—	—	—
1992–93	Traktor Chelyabinsk	IHL	38	17	13	30	18	8	2	2	4	8
1993–94	Traktor Chelyabinsk	IHL	46	17	15	32	38	—	—	—	—	—
1994–95	KalPa	SM-liiga	32	9	6	15	20	—	—	—	—	—
1994–95	RoKi-79 Rovaniemi	FIN-4	—	—	—	—	—	5	6	5	11	6
1995–96	RoKi-79 Rovaniemi	FIN-3	32	45	41	86	83	5	4	6	10	10
1996–97	RoKi-79 Rovaniemi	FIN-3	14	9	26	35	22	—	—	—	—	—
1997–98	RoKi-79 Rovaniemi	FIN-3	21	20	17	37	16	—	—	—	—	—
2000–01	Et-Po 72 Ylitornio	FIN-3	—	—	—	—	—	6	10	8	18	4
2001–02	Et-Po 72 Ylitornio	Suomi-sarja	31	22	41	63	12	2	1	1	2	0
2002–03	Et-Po 72 Ylitornio	Suomi-sarja	26	20	21	41	30	—	—	—	—	—
2003–04	Et-Po 72 Ylitornio	Suomi-sarja	14	7	10	17	10	—	—	—	—	—

== International statistics ==
Year	Team	Event	Place	GP	G	A	Pts	PIM
1985	Soviet Union	EJC	2nd place, silver medalist(s)	5	3	0	3	8
1993	Russia	WC	1st place, gold medalist(s)	8	1	0	1	2
