= Maxim Yakutsenya =

Russian ice hockey player

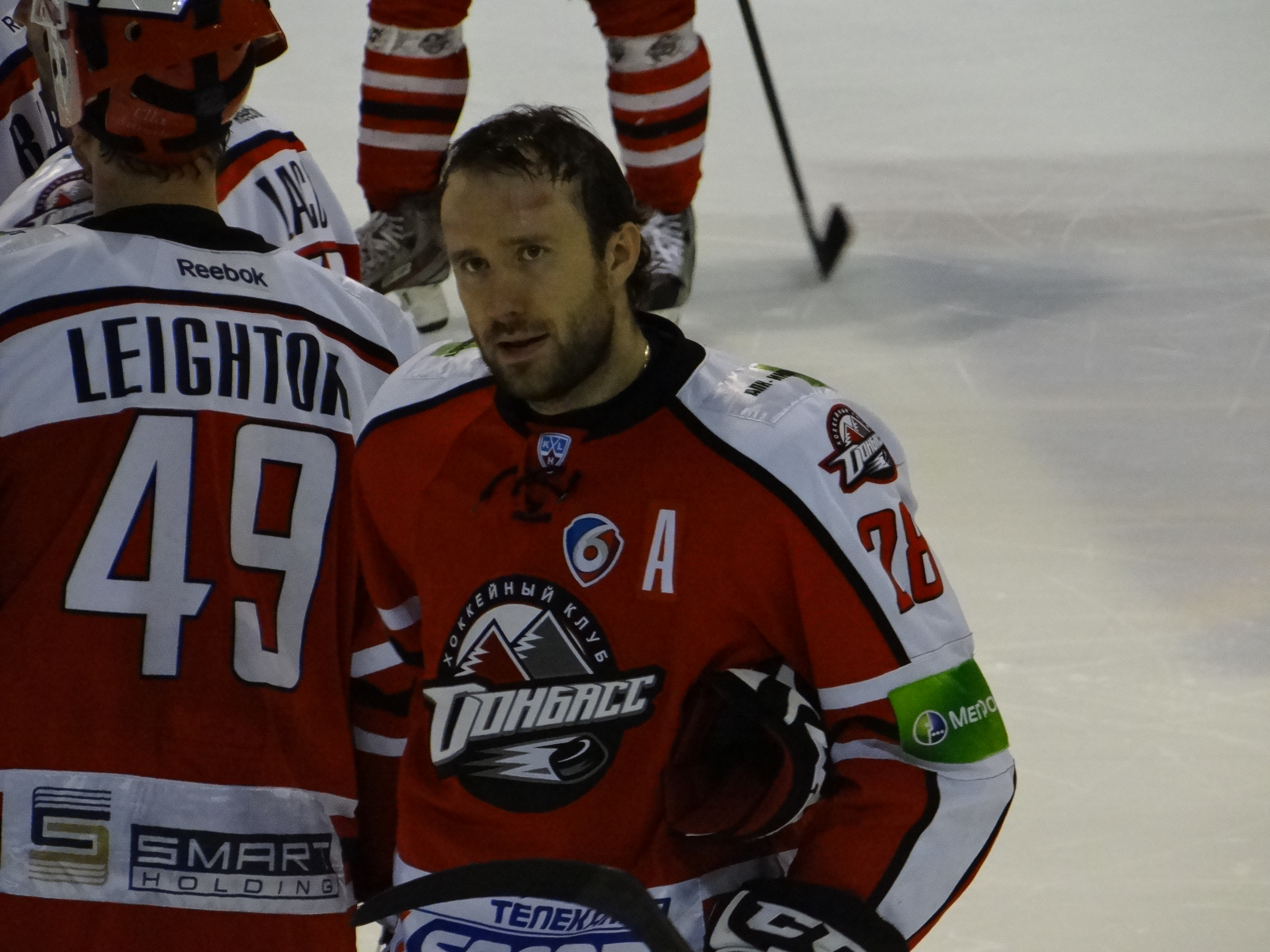
- Born: February 14, 1981 (age 44); Serov, Russia
- Height: 6 ft 0 in (183 cm)
- Weight: 187 lb (85 kg; 13 st 5 lb)
- Position: Forward
- Shoots: Left
- Slovak team Former teams: HC 07 Detva; Mechel Chelyabinsk; Salavat Yulaev Ufa; CSKA Moscow; Metallurg Novokuznetsk; Avangard Omsk; HC Neftekhimik Nizhnekamsk; Traktor Chelyabinsk; HC Donbass; Metallurg Magnitogorsk
- Playing career: 1999–present

Maxim Yakutsenya (born February 14, 1981) is a Russian professional ice hockey forward who plays for HC 07 Detva of the Slovak Extraliga (Slovak). In 2014 he received a special official award from the KHL called Iron Man, for playing more games than any other player in the last 3 years.
