= K'Andre Miller =

American ice hockey player (born 2000)

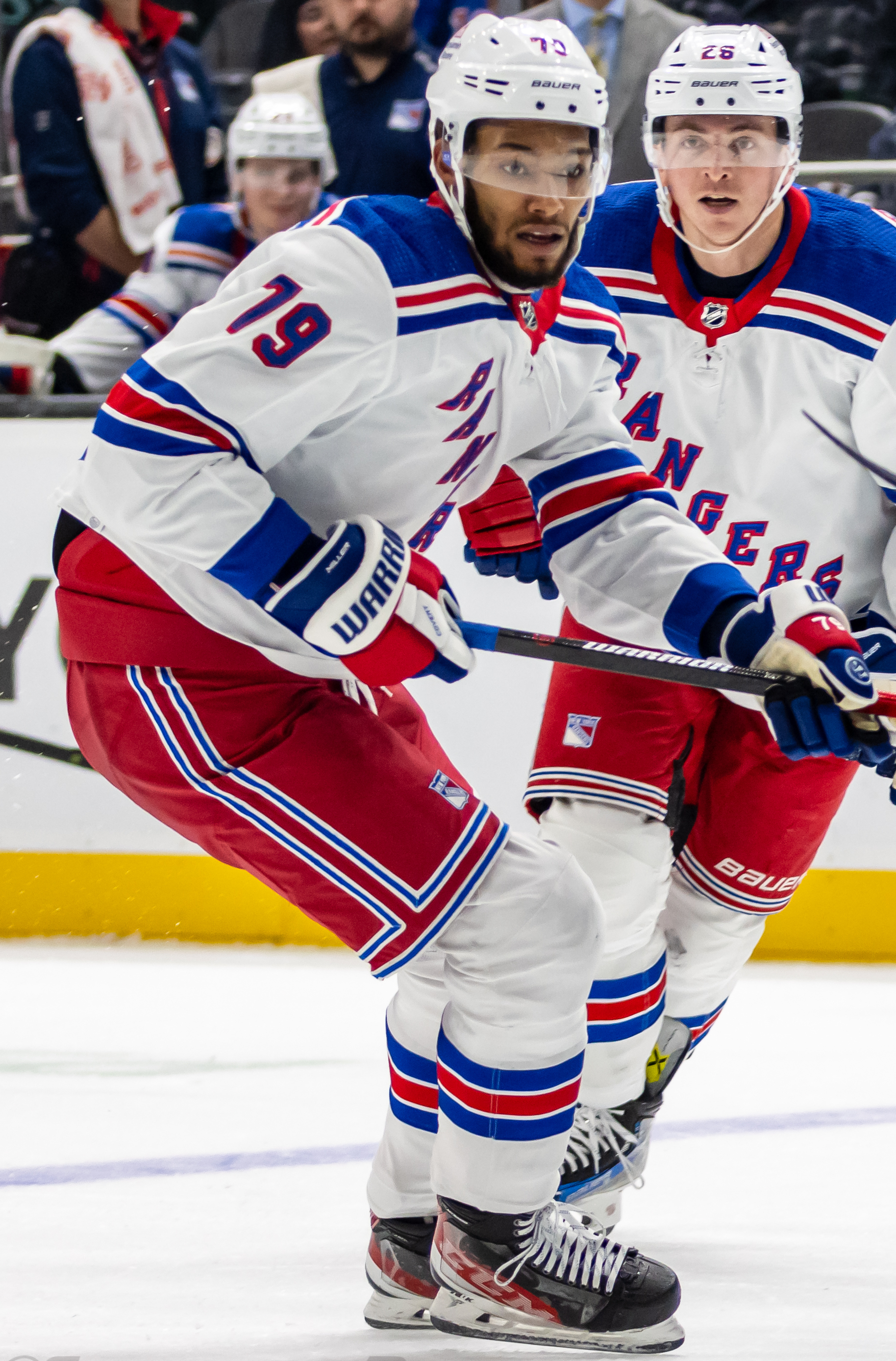
- Miller (left) with the New York Rangers in 2023
- Born: January 21, 2000 (age 26) Saint Paul, Minnesota, U.S.
- Height: 6 ft 5 in (196 cm)
- Weight: 210 lb (95 kg; 15 st 0 lb)
- Position: Defense
- Shoots: Left
- NHL team Former teams: Carolina Hurricanes; New York Rangers
- NHL draft: 22nd overall, 2018; New York Rangers
- Playing career: 2021–present

K'Andre Miller (born January 21, 2000) is an American professional ice hockey player who is a defenseman for the Carolina Hurricanes of the National Hockey League (NHL). He was selected in the first round, 22nd overall, by the New York Rangers of the 2018 NHL entry draft.

Born in Saint Paul, Minnesota, Miller began ice skating at the age of two. He was primarily a forward, modeling his style of play after Mikko Koivu, but switched positions when Minnetonka High School needed another defenseman. He left Minnetonka after two years to join the USA Hockey National Team Development Program, with which he spent two seasons playing in the United States Hockey League (USHL) and in international tournaments like the 2016 World U-17 Hockey Challenge and the 2018 World U18 Championships. After his time in the development program, Miller played college ice hockey for two seasons with the Wisconsin Badgers, while also appearing in two consecutive World Junior Championships.

Miller left Wisconsin after two seasons to sign a contract with the Rangers. Due to the COVID-19 pandemic, he did not join the team until the 2020–21 season. As a rookie playing alongside Jacob Trouba, Miller established himself as a part of the Rangers' young core, consistently seeing over 20 minutes of ice time per game and earning NHL All-Rookie Team honors at the end of the season. In July 2025, he was traded to the Hurricanes, with whom he won the Stanley Cup in 2026.

== Early life ==
Miller was born on January 21, 2000, in Saint Paul, Minnesota, He began ice skating at the age of two, and took up ice hockey shortly afterwards. In addition to playing hockey, Miller was a child actor and model for Target and Honda, and he played American football under coach, former Major League Baseball pitcher, and family friend Rick Helling. Originally a forward on his youth hockey teams, Miller's role model was Mikko Koivu, longtime captain for the Minnesota Wild. He only volunteered to switch positions while playing for Minnetonka High School, which needed an extra defenseman.

After registering five goals and 11 assists during his second season with Minnetonka, Miller left his high school to join the USA Hockey National Team Development Program (NTDP). Playing on the team's under-17 squad during the 2016–17 minor ice hockey season, he recorded three goals and 14 assists for 17 points in 54 regular season and tournament games. Additionally, he joined Team USA for 34 United States Hockey League (USHL) games, during which he added an additional seven assists. The following year, he was promoted to the NTDP's under-18 team, with whom he scored nine goals and 29 points in 58 regular season and tournament games. His four goals and 12 assists in 22 USHL games, meanwhile, gave Miller an average of 0.73 points per game, the fifth-highest among USHL defensemen that season.

== Playing career ==
=== NCAA ===
Coming off of his stint with the NTDP, Miller was the first Minnesota native taken by a National Hockey League (NHL) team in the 2018 NHL entry draft, going in the first round, 22nd overall, to the New York Rangers. Just prior to the draft, the Rangers had sent their 26th and 48th overall picks to the Ottawa Senators to trade up for no. 22. Two years prior to his NHL draft, Miller had already committed to attending the University of Wisconsin to play college ice hockey with the Wisconsin Badgers.

Newly appointed Wisconsin head coach Tony Granato had voiced a desire to build the Badgers' 2018–19 season around their young defensemen, and Miller was partnered with fellow freshman Ty Emberson. Through his first six games, Miller had seven points and led the National Collegiate Athletic Association (NCAA) with a +9 plus–minus. One of those seven points was the Badgers' first goal of the season, which broke open scoring on a 3–0 win over the Boston College Eagles on October 12, 2018. By Wisconsin's holiday break, Miller led the team with 17 points and had been twice named the Hockey Commissioners' Association National Rookie of the Month, for October and December. Although his season came to a premature end after suffering a leg injury during a February 9 game against the OSU Buckeyes, Miller finished the season with five goals, 22 points, and a +7 rating, and he was a finalist for Big Ten Conference Freshman of the Year. He was also named to the 2019 All-Big Ten All-Freshman Team.

Following his successful freshman campaign, Miller entered the 2019–20 NCAA season as one of only two unanimous selections to the preseason All-Big Ten First Team. He was suspended during the preseason for an unspecified violation of team rules but was able to rejoin the team for their season opener against Boston College. His sophomore season was less successful than the previous year: although he had seven goals, his overall point production was down, with only 18 in 36 regular-season games. Additionally, some defensive struggles pushed his plus–minus down to −7. On March 16, 2020, Miller chose to end his college career after only two seasons by signing an entry-level contract with the Rangers. In 62 NCAA appearances, he had a total of 40 points.

=== Professional ===
==== New York Rangers (2021–2025) ====
Miller's contract with the Rangers did not begin until the 2020–21 season. Normally, he would have joined the Hartford Wolf Pack, the Rangers' American Hockey League affiliate, for the remainder of their 2019–20 season, but by the time he left Wisconsin, the COVID-19 pandemic had already forced the suspension of both the NHL and AHL seasons. These pandemic disruptions left it unclear if Miller, who was already joining an unusually young defensive corps, would begin the 2020–21 season with the Rangers, or if he would need an extra year of development in Hartford.

Although Rangers coach David Quinn had previously announced that Tony DeAngelo would be paired with Jacob Trouba, New York's highest-paid defenseman, Miller impressed enough in training camp that, in addition to making the Rangers' opening-night roster for the 2020–21 season, he was promoted to Trouba's pair. His first NHL point came in his fourth game, an assist in a 4–3 loss against the Pittsburgh Penguins on January 22, 2021. His first goal came four days later, when he pushed one past Linus Ullmark in a 3–2 loss to the Buffalo Sabres. Playing on the second defensive pair with Trouba, Miller quickly became a staple in the Rangers roster, logging over 20 minutes of ice time per game and contributing on both the power play and penalty kill units. Although the Rangers struggled in the NHL's difficult East Division and missed the 2021 Stanley Cup playoffs, (Note: Due in part to Canada-United States travel restrictions caused by the COVID-19 pandemic, the NHL realigned its divisions for the 2020–21 season. Teams were divided into North, West, Central, and East, and played only the other teams within their division.) Miller, Alexis Lafrenière, and Kaapo Kakko anchored a core of players aged 22 or younger who sportswriters saw as capable of leading the team through future seasons. He finished the season with five goals and 12 points in 53 games while averaging 21 minutes and 7 seconds of ice time per game and was named to the NHL All-Rookie Team for 2021.

Miller began the 2021–22 season in a sophomore slump, with only one goal, one assist, and a −4 rating through the first 13 games, and he was removed from the penalty kill unit after struggling to stop goals. His first goal of the year came on November 8, when he took the puck from the Rangers' defensive zone all the way across the ice and past Sergei Bobrovsky of the Florida Panthers.

During a game against the Dallas Stars on January 12, 2023, Miller scored the tying goal with only 1 second remaining in the third period. He became the fourth player in Rangers franchise history for the "latest game-tying goals", joining Brian Leetch (1998), Darren Turcotte (1992), and Doug Robinson (1965).

On February 26, 2023, in a game against the Los Angeles Kings, Miller received a match penalty and was ejected from the game late in the first period for spitting in the face of Kings' defenseman Drew Doughty during a scrum. A hearing was subsequently held with the NHL's player safety department and Miller was issued a three-game suspension for unsportsmanlike conduct. Miller later claimed the incident was accidental. Doughty said that there had been no prior interaction between him and Miller prior to the incident and stated following the game, "Whether or not he meant to do it, I have no idea. It's a pretty big loogie on my face, so I was pretty pissed."

==== Carolina Hurricanes (2025–present) ====
On July 1, 2025, Miller was traded to the Carolina Hurricanes in exchange for Scott Morrow, a conditional 2026 first-round pick, and a 2026 second-round pick. Miller subsequently agreed to an eight-year, $60 million contract extension with Carolina.

On October 9, in his debut with Carolina, Miller scored two goals in a 6–3 win against the New Jersey Devils.

== International play ==
Medal record

Men's ice hockey

Representing United States

World Junior Championships
Silver medal – second place	2019 Canada	

World U18 Championships
Silver medal – second place	2018 Russia	

Miller's role in the USA Hockey National Team Development Program allowed him to represent the United States at a number of international under-18 ice hockey tournaments, beginning with the 2016 World U-17 Hockey Challenge. He appeared in six games and recorded one assist for the United States, who finished the tournament in fifth place. Two years later, he appeared with the United States team at the 2018 World U18 Championships, helping take the team to a silver-medal finish with one goal, two assists, and a +4 rating in seven games.

After aging out of under-18 tournaments, Miller represented the United States junior team at back-to-back World Junior Championships (WJC). At the 2019 tournament, Miller received limited ice time as he attempted to play through an illness that swept through the team, but he had one assist and a +1 rating through six games, and although the United States lost to Finland 3–2 in the championship game, Miller earned another silver medal. The following year, Miller served as an alternate captain for the United States and logged the highest number of minutes of any American defenseman, but after losing 1–0 to Finland in the quarterfinals, the United States failed to medal at the World Juniors for the first time in five years.

== Personal life ==
Miller, who is biracial, has been vocal throughout his NHL career about racism both in ice hockey and more broadly in North America. In March 2020, shortly after he signed with the Rangers, Miller was a victim of Zoombombing during a Rangers video chat, with a hacker interrupting his Q&A to repeatedly make racial slurs using the Zoom chat function. The incident was condemned by the NHL, the Rangers staff, USA Hockey, and several of Miller's New York teammates. In a statement released on Twitter after the Q&A, Miller said that he had been the subject of similar racialized incidents throughout his hockey career and that he chose not to quit the sport out of love for it. After the murder of George Floyd in May 2020, he voiced his support for the Black Lives Matter movement.

Miller attended the 2018 NHL draft with his mother, former MLB pitcher Rick Helling, and Helling's daughter Jordyn. While playing for the Minnesota Blades, Miller would help coach and put on clinics for the Junior Blades team, which Helling's daughter was a member of. Helling would later coach Miller when he played football at Minnetonka High School. Miller considers Helling a mentor.

Miller and his girlfriend Addison Clark welcomed a baby boy in May 2026, while he was playing with the Carolina Hurricanes as a contender (and eventual victor) in the 2026 Stanley Cup Playoffs.

== Career statistics ==
=== Regular season and playoffs ===
			Regular season					Playoffs
Season	Team	League	GP	G	A	Pts	PIM	GP	G	A	Pts	PIM
2016–17	U.S. National Development Team	USHL	34	0	7	7	12	—	—	—	—	—
2017–18	U.S. National Development Team	USHL	22	4	12	16	6	—	—	—	—	—
2018–19	University of Wisconsin	B1G	26	5	17	22	18	—	—	—	—	—
2019–20	University of Wisconsin	B1G	36	7	11	18	24	—	—	—	—	—
2020–21	New York Rangers	NHL	53	5	7	12	20	—	—	—	—	—
2021–22	New York Rangers	NHL	82	7	13	20	24	20	2	5	7	10
2022–23	New York Rangers	NHL	79	9	34	43	47	7	0	1	1	4
2023–24	New York Rangers	NHL	80	8	22	30	49	16	1	3	4	8
2024–25	New York Rangers	NHL	74	7	20	27	22	—	—	—	—	—
2025–26	Carolina Hurricanes	NHL	72	8	29	37	56	19	0	9	9	10
NHL totals			440	44	125	169	218	62	3	18	21	32

=== International ===
Year	Team	Event	Result	GP	G	A	Pts	PIM
2016	United States	U17	5th	5	0	1	1	0
2018	United States	U18	2nd place, silver medalist(s)	7	1	2	3	4
2019	United States	WJC	2nd place, silver medalist(s)	6	0	1	1	0
2020	United States	WJC	6th	5	0	2	2	2
Junior totals				23	1	6	7	6

== Awards and honors ==
Award	Year
Big Ten Conference
All-Rookie Team	2019
Preseason First Team	2020
NHL
All-Rookie Team	2021
Stanley Cup champion	2026

== Notes ==
Awards and achievements
Preceded by Vitali Kravtsov	New York Rangers first round draft pick 2018	Succeeded by Nils Lundkvist
