= Yuri Morozov (ice hockey) =

Soviet ice hockey player (1938–2022)

Yuri Ivanovich Morozov (31 March 1938 – 26 May 2022) was an ice hockey player who played in the Soviet Hockey League. He was born in Moscow, and played for Khimik Moscow Oblast. He was inducted into the Russian and Soviet Hockey Hall of Fame in 1970.
