= Yuri Moiseyev (ice hockey) =

Soviet ice hockey player (1940–2005)

- Born: July 15, 1940 Penza, Russian SFSR, USSR
- Died: September 24, 2005 (aged 65)
- Height: 5 ft 7 in (170 cm)
- Weight: 161 lb (73 kg; 11 st 7 lb)
- Position: Left wing
- Shot: Left
- Played for: Metallurg Novokuznetsk; HC CSKA Moscow
- National team: Soviet Union
- Playing career: 1958–1972

Olympic medal record

Men's ice hockey
Gold medal – first place	1968 Grenoble	Team

Yuri Ivanovich Moiseev (July 15, 1940 in Penza, Soviet Union – September 24, 2005) was an ice hockey player who played in the Soviet Hockey League. He played for HC CSKA Moscow.

He won a gold medal at the 1968 Winter Olympics, and at the 1968 World Championships. He was inducted into the Russian and Soviet Hockey Hall of Fame in 1968.
