= Traktor Ice Arena =

Indoor sporting arena

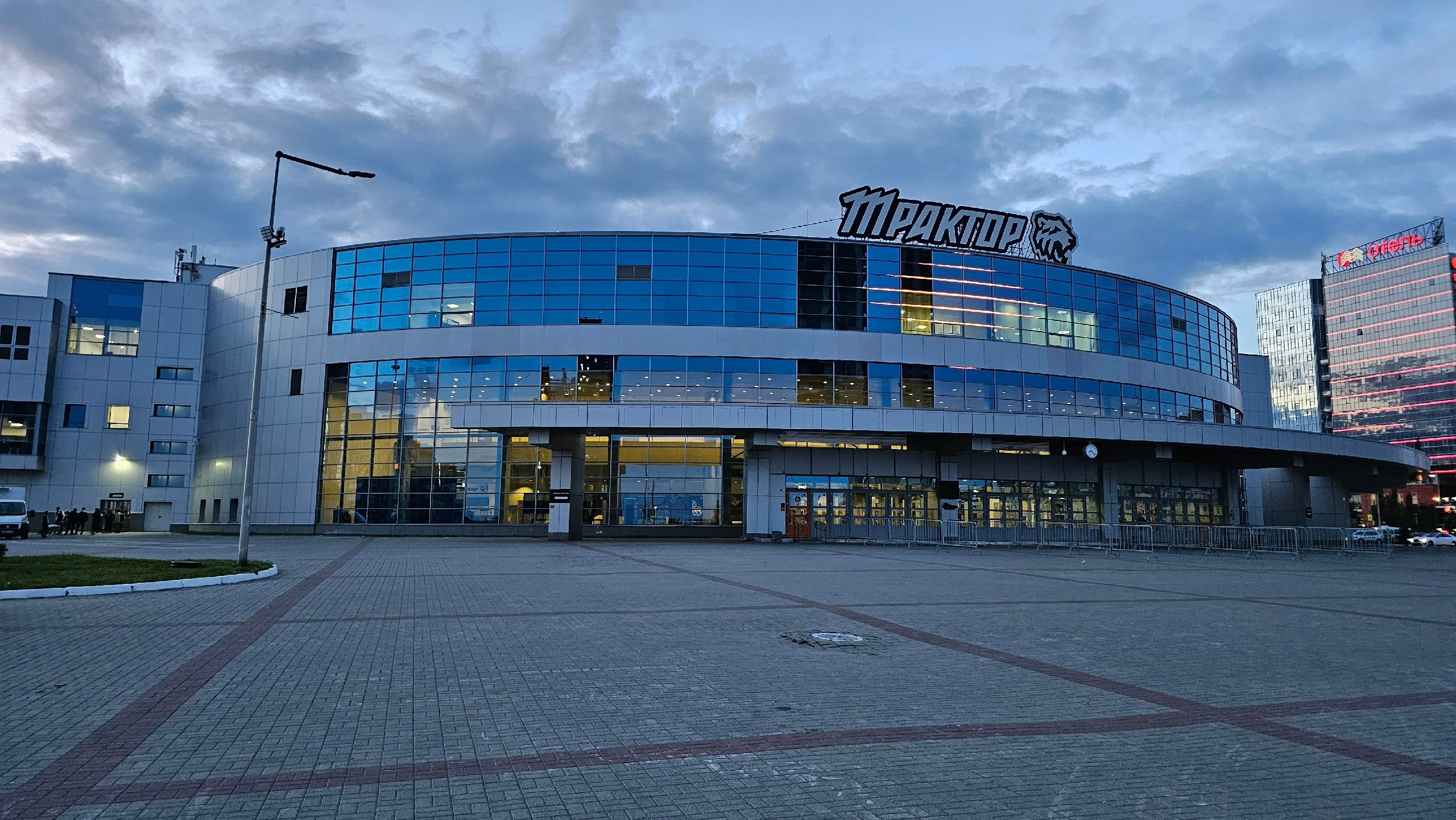
- Interactive map of Traktor Ice Arena
- Full name: Traktor Ice Arena named after Valery Konsantinovich Belousov
- Location: Chelyabinsk, Russia
- Coordinates: 55.174918°N 61.287283°E
- Owner: Chelyabinsk Oblast
- Capacity: 7,517
- Field size: 60×28 m

Construction
- Groundbreaking: 2007
- Built: 2009
- Opened: 17 January 2009; 17 years ago
- Cost: 981,000,000 roubles/ 41,340,075 USD (in 2008)
- Project manager: Skanska
- General contractor: Baltic Building Company

Tenants
- Traktor Chelyabinsk (KHL) (2009–present); Belye Medvedi (MHL) (2009–present)

Traktor Ice Arena named after Valery Konsantinovich Belousov (Russian: Ледо́вая аре́на «Тра́ктор» имени Валерия Константиновича Белоусова, romanized: Ledóvaya aréna «Tráktor» imeni Valeriya Konstantinovicha Belousova), commonly shortened to Traktor Ice Arena, is an indoor sporting arena located in Chelyabinsk, Russia.

It is used for various indoor events and is the home arena of Traktor Chelyabinsk of the Kontinental Hockey League (KHL) and Belye Medvedi of Junior Hockey League (MHL). The capacity of the arena is 7,500 spectators. In 2009, it replaced Yunost Sport Palace as the home of Traktor. The arena is named after former Traktor head coach Valery Belousov.

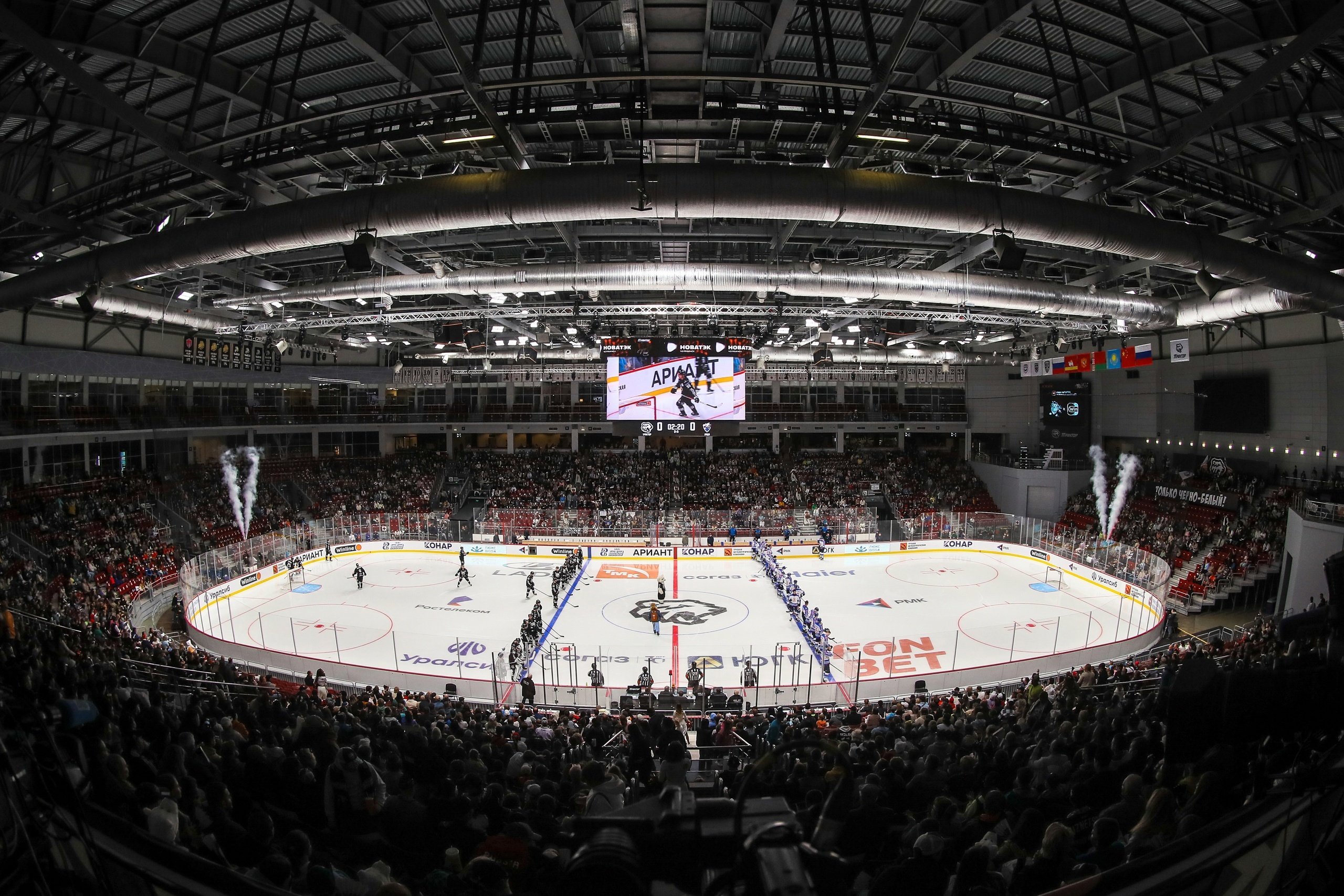
Tractor Arena Chelyabinsk, Tractor vs Lada

== Construction ==
The arena was designed by Swedish company Skanska. Construction began in spring 2007 and was originally expected to finish by the 2008-09 season. But due to subsequent construction problems the official opening was rescheduled for January 2009.

On 15 February 2013, the arena was damaged by the blast wave from the explosion of the Chelyabinsk meteor. The arena was closed for inspection, affecting various scheduled events.

== Events ==
- 2012 European Judo Championships
- 2012 KHL Junior Draft
- 2013 KHL All-Star Game
- 2013 Gagarin Cup Finals
- 2014 World Judo Championships
- 2015 World Taekwondo Championships

== See also ==
- List of indoor arenas in Russia

Preceded by Yunost Sport Palace	Home of the Traktor Chelyabinsk; 2009–present	Succeeded by Current
