= Sergei Pushkov =

Soviet Russian ice hockey player

Sergei Pushkov (born 24 February 1964) is a retired ice hockey player who played in the Soviet Hockey League. He played for SKA St. Petersburg. He was inducted into the Russian and Soviet Hockey Hall of Fame in 1993.
