= Andrei Sapozhnikov =

Russian ice hockey player

- Born: June 15, 1971 (age 55) Chelyabinsk, Soviet Union
- Height: 6 ft 1 in (185 cm)
- Weight: 183 lb (83 kg; 13 st 1 lb)
- Position: Defence
- Shot: Left
- Played for: Traktor Chelyabinsk; Providence Bruins; HC Fassa; Wedemark Scorpions; Metallurg Magnitogorsk; Severstal Cherepovets; Khimik Voskresensk; Avangard Omsk; Vityaz Chekhov
- National team: Russia
- NHL draft: 129th overall, 1993; Boston Bruins
- Playing career: 1995–2011

Andrei Sapozhnikov (born June 15, 1971) is a Russian former ice hockey defenceman. He is currently working as an assistant coach for HC Vityaz of the Kontinental Hockey League (KHL).

Sapozhnikov played in the Soviet Hockey League and the Russian Superleague for Traktor Chelyabinsk, Metallurg Magnitogorsk, Severstal Cherepovets, Khimik Voskresensk, Avangard Omsk and Vityaz Chekhov. He also played in Italy's Serie A for HC Fassa and Germany's Deutsche Eishockey Liga for the Wedemark Scorpions.

Sapozhnikov was drafted 129th overall by the Boston Bruins in the 1993 NHL entry draft and had a brief spell with the Bruins organization in the 1994–95 season, playing nineteen games for their American Hockey League affiliate the Providence Bruins. Sapozhnikov was also a member of the Russia national team for the 1993 IIHF World Championship.

He was inducted into the Russian and Soviet Hockey Hall of Fame in 1993.
