= Yuri Paramoshkin =

Russian ice hockey player

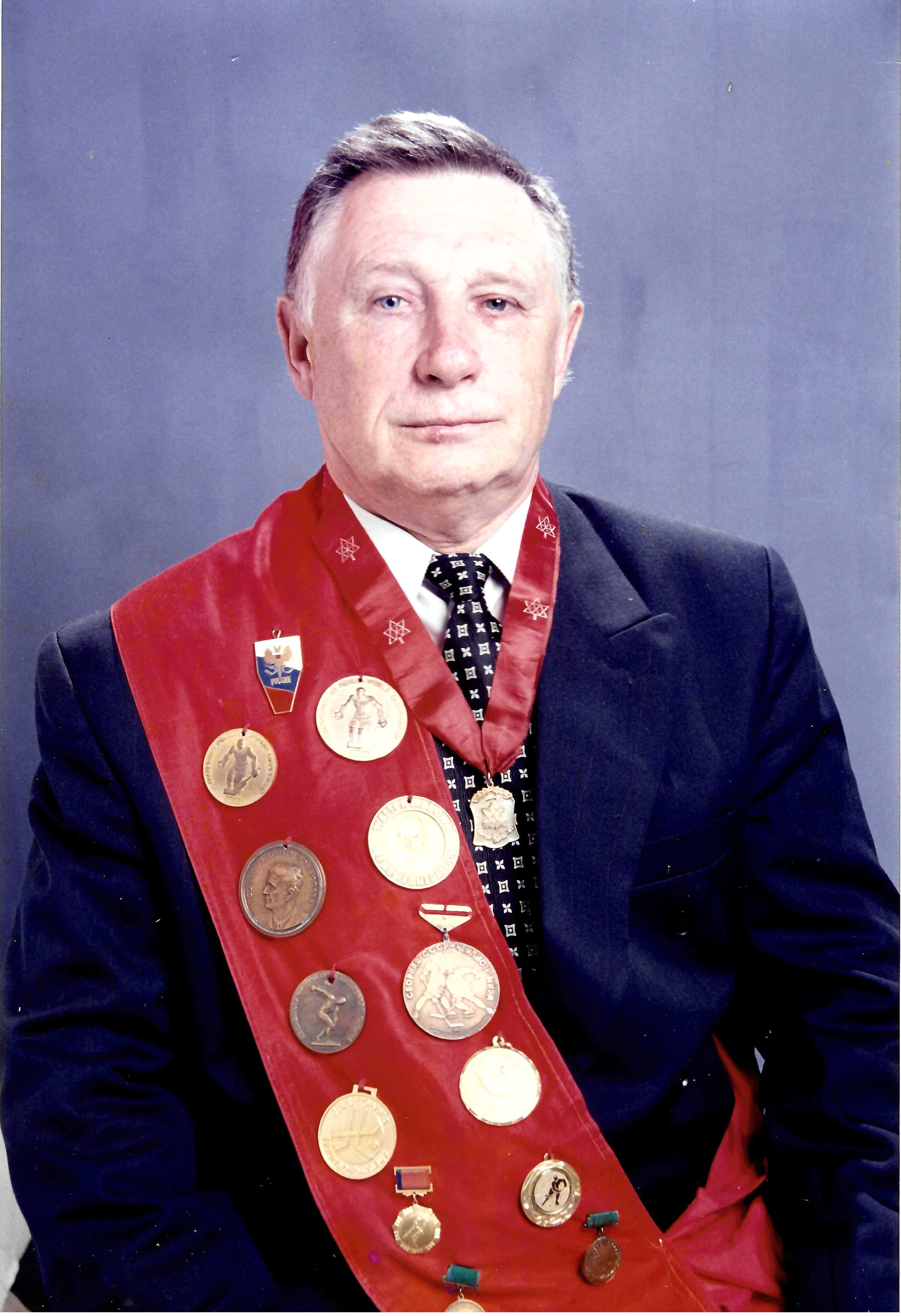
- Yuri Paramoshkin
- Born: November 3, 1937 (age 88)
- team: Soviet Union
- Playing career: 1955–1970

Yuri Paramoshkin (born November 3, 1937, in Elektrostal, Russia) is a retired ice hockey player who played in the Soviet Hockey League. He played for HC Dynamo Moscow. He was inducted into the Russian and Soviet Hockey Hall of Fame in 1991.
