= Igor Dmitriev (ice hockey) =

Russian ice hockey player and coach

- Born: 19 October 1941; Moscow, Russian SFSR, Soviet Union
- Died: 21 December 1997 (aged 56); Moscow, Russia
- Position: Center
- Played for: Krylya Sovetov Moscow; Klagenfurter AC
- Playing career: 1955–1975

Igor Yefimovich Dmitriev (Russian: И́горь Ефи́мович Дми́триев; 19 October 1941 – 21 December, 1997) was a Russian ice hockey player and coach. He was inducted into the Russian and Soviet Hockey Hall of Fame in 1974 as a player, and in 1988 as a builder. He was posthumously inducted into the IIHF Hall of Fame as a builder in 2007.

== Career ==
=== Playing career ===
In 1955, he began his career with Krylya Sovetov Moscow junior team. In 1958, he joined the senior team. He won both the Soviet Championship League and Soviet Cup with his team in 1974. He scored 125 goals in 430 games for Krylya Sovetov Moscow, whom he captained. In 1974, he played one season with Klagenfurter AC in the Austrian Hockey League, before retiring.

=== Coaching career ===
He began his coaching career in 1978 as an assistant coach for Krylya Sovetov Moscow. He became the head coach in 1983, a position he held until 1996. He was an assistant coach for the Soviet national team and Russian national team from 1987 to 1994. He also coached the Russian national junior team in 1996–97. He won the gold medal with the Soviet national team at the 1988 Winter Olympics, and at the World Ice Hockey Championships in 1989 and 1990. He won a bronze medal at the 1996 World Junior Ice Hockey Championships.
