= Boris Zapryagaev =

Russian ice hockey player

- Born: 28 February 1922 Moscow, Russian SFSR, Soviet Union
- Died: 20 April 2000 (aged 78) Moscow, Russian SFSR, Soviet Union
- Position: Goaltender
- Played for: Krylya Sovetov Moscow
- National team: Soviet Union
- Playing career: 1947–1961

Boris Leonidovich Zapryagaev (Russian: Борис Леонидович Запрягаев; 28 February 1922 – 20 April 2000) was a Russian ice hockey and football goaltender. Initially playing bandy, Zapryagaev later competed in ice hockey for Krylya Sovetov Moscow from 1947 to 1961, playing about 270 games for them in the Soviet Championship League. He received the title of Merited Master of Sports of the USSR in ice hockey in 1954, and won the national championship in 1956-57. He later served as a coach for Krylya.

Zapryagaev also played association football, suiting up for Perm (1941-1943), Krylya Sovetov Moscow (1943-1948), Torpedo Moscow (1949-1952), and Krylya Sovetov/Zenith Kuibyshev (1953).
