= Mikhail Varnakov (ice hockey, born 1957) =

- Born: June 25, 1957 (age 68) Nizhny Novgorod, Russian SFSR, Soviet Union
- Height: 5 ft 9 in (175 cm)
- Weight: 165 lb (75 kg; 11 st 11 lb)
- Position: Left wing
- Shot: Left
- Played for: Torpedo Gorky; HC CSKA Moscow; VEU Feldkirch; Torpedo Nizhny Novgorod
- National team: Soviet Union
- Playing career: 1975–1993

Mikhail Varnakov (born June 25, 1957, in Gorky, Soviet Union) is a retired ice hockey player who played in the Soviet Hockey League. He played for HC Torpedo Nizhny Novgorod. He was inducted into the Russian and Soviet Hockey Hall of Fame in 1985.
