= Yunost Sport Palace =

Ice hockey arena in Chelyabinsk, Russia

- Дворец спорта «Юность»
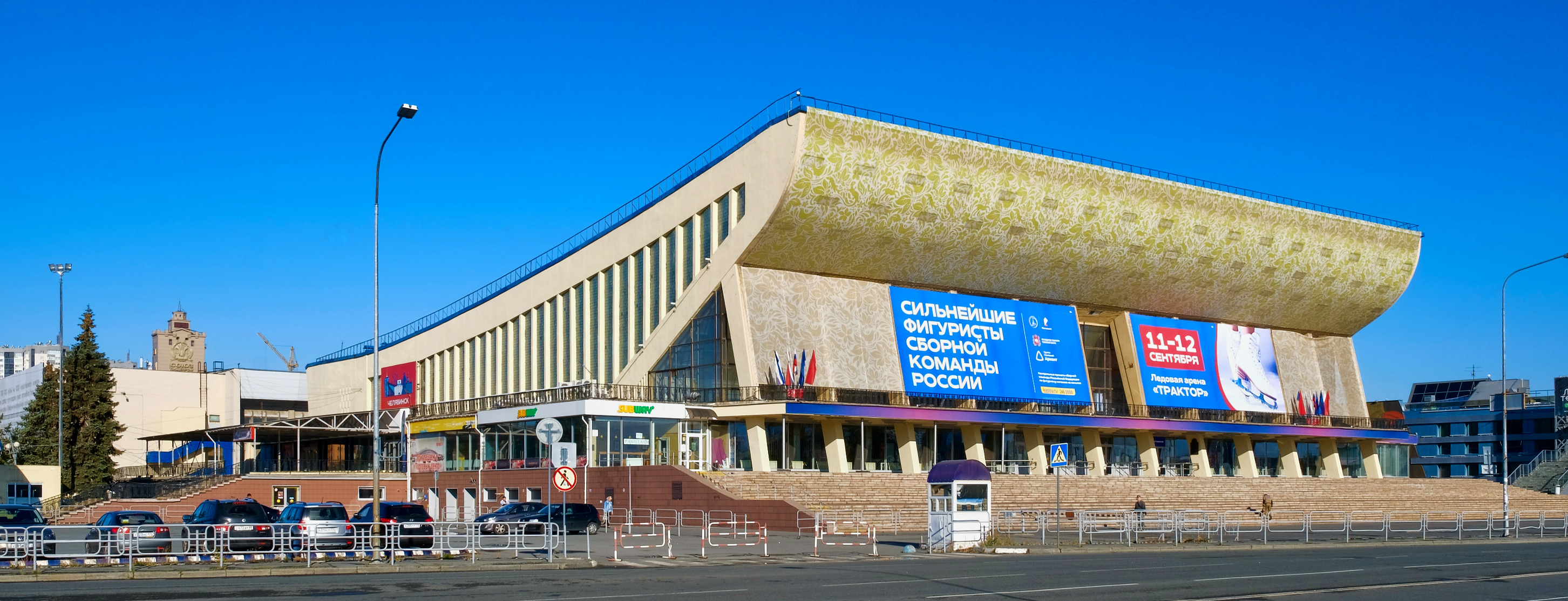
- Interactive map of Yunost Sport Palace
- Address: Свердловский проспект, 51
- Location: Chelyabinsk, Russia
- Coordinates: 55.1690°N 61.3916°E
- Owner: City of Chelyabinsk
- Operator: Chelyabinsk City Council
- Capacity: 3,560

Construction
- Groundbreaking: 1966
- Opened: 3 November 1967
- Renovated: 1986
- Expanded: 1983
- Architect: T.M. Ervald
- Structural engineer: Aleksandr Oatul

Tenants
- Traktor Chelyabinsk (1967-2009); Chelmet Chelyabinsk (VHL) (2012-present)

Yunost Sport Palace (Russian: Дворец спорта Юность, romanized: Dvorets sporta Yunost') is an indoor sporting arena located in Chelyabinsk, Russia. The capacity of the arena is 3,500. It was built in 1967 and served as the home arena for the ice hockey team Traktor Chelyabinsk until 2009, at which time the team moved to the newly constructed Traktor Sport Palace.

Starting with the 2012–13 season, Yunost Sport Palace has been the home arena of Supreme Hockey League (VHL) team Chelmet Chelyabinsk. Three sports schools utilize the arena's facilities: MBU SSHOR Todes (МБУ СШОР Тодес), a primary and secondary school specializing in figure skating; the Sergei Makarov School (Школа имени Сергея Макарова; named after Sergei Makarov), which specializes in ice hockey; and Veronika Dance School (Вероника школа танцев), a secondary school specializing in dancesport.
