= 2018 Gagarin Cup playoffs =

Tournament details
- Dates: March 3–April 22, 2018
- Teams: 16

Final positions
- Champions: Ak Bars Kazan
- Runner-up: CSKA Moscow

Tournament statistics
- Scoring leader(s): Justin Azevedo (24 points)

The 2018 Gagarin Cup playoffs of the Kontinental Hockey League (KHL) began on March 3, 2018, with the top eight teams from each of the conferences, following the conclusion of the 2017–18 KHL regular season.

== Playoff seeds ==
After the regular season, the standard 16 teams qualified for the playoffs. The Western Conference regular season winners and Continental Cup winners are SKA Saint Petersburg with 138 points. Ak Bars Kazan are the Eastern Conference regular season winners with 100 points.

== Draw ==
The playoffs started on March 3, 2018, with the top eight teams from each of the conferences and ended on April 22, 2018.

Conference Quarterfinals	Conference Semifinals
1	(Russia) Ak Bars	4
8	(Russia) Amur	1
1	(Russia) Ak Bars	4
5	(Russia) Metallurg Mg	1
2	(Russia) Salavat Yulaev	4
7	(Russia) Avangard	3
Eastern Conference
3	(Russia) Traktor	4
6	(Russia) Neftekhimik	1
2	(Russia) Salavat Yulaev	3
3	(Russia) Traktor	4
4	(Russia) Avtomobilist	2
5	(Russia) Metallurg Mg	4
1	(Russia) SKA	4
8	(Russia) Severstal	0
1	(Russia) SKA	4
4	(Russia) Lokomotiv	1
2	(Russia) CSKA	4
7	(Russia) Spartak	0
Western Conference
3	(Finland) Jokerit	4
6	(Russia) Sochi	1
2	(Russia) CSKA	4
3	(Finland) Jokerit	2
4	(Russia) Lokomotiv	4
5	(Russia) Torpedo	0

Conference Finals
1	(Russia) Ak Bars	4
3	(Russia) Traktor	0
1	(Russia) SKA	2
2	(Russia) CSKA	4

Gagarin Cup Finals
E1	(Russia) Ak Bars	4
W2	(Russia) CSKA	1

== Player statistics ==
=== Scoring leaders ===
As of 22 Apr 2018

Player	Team	GP	G	A	Pts	+/–	PIM
Justin Azevedo	Ak Bars Kazan	19	9	15	24	+7	6
Linus Omark	Salavat Yulaev Ufa	14	4	13	17	+7	33
Richard Gynge	Traktor Chelyabinsk	16	8	8	16	+7	6
Stanislav Galiev	Ak Bars Kazan	19	10	5	15	+10	8
Mikhail Grigorenko	CSKA Moscow	21	9	4	13	+7	28
Anton Lander	Ak Bars Kazan	19	8	5	13	+7	4
Alexei Kruchinin	Traktor Chelyabinsk	16	5	8	13	+4	2
Jiří Sekáč	Ak Bars Kazan	15	4	9	13	+3	2
Alexander Popov	CSKA Moscow	21	2	11	13	+5	0
Nikita Gusev	SKA Saint Petersburg	15	7	5	12	+5	2

Source: KHL

=== Leading goaltenders ===
As of 22 Apr 2018

Player	Team	GP	Min	W	L	GA	SO	SV%	GAA
Karri Rämö	Jokerit	6	457	4	2	10	0	.954	1.31
Ilya Sorokin	CSKA Moscow	18	1062	10	6	27	5	.930	1.52
Emil Garipov	Ak Bars Kazan	19	1159	16	3	30	2	.944	1.55
Mikko Koskinen	SKA Saint Petersburg	15	924	10	5	25	4	.935	1.62
Alexander Trushkov	Spartak Moscow	3	105	0	1	3	0	.942	1.71

Source: KHL
