= Yuri Fedorov =

Russian retired ice hockey defenceman

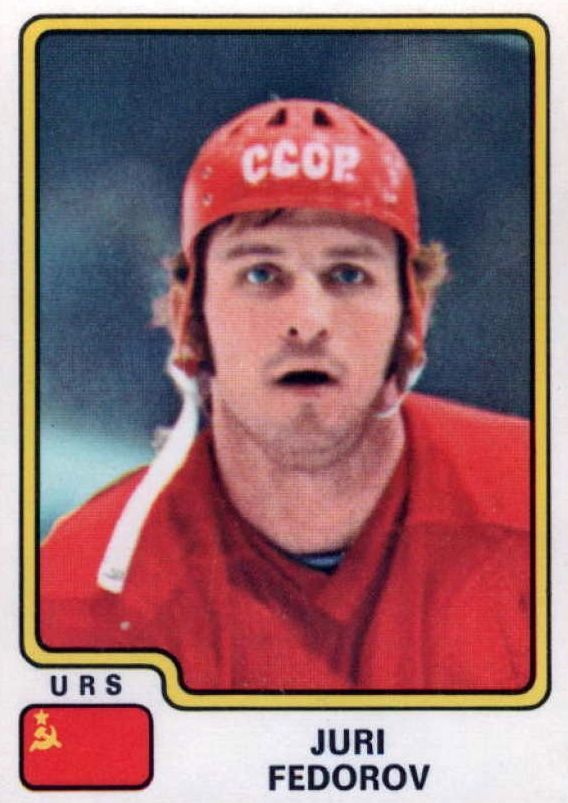
- Born: July 8, 1949 (age 77) Ulyanovsk, Russian SFSR, Soviet Union
- Height: 6 ft 0 in (183 cm)
- Weight: 185 lb (84 kg; 13 st 3 lb)
- Position: Defence
- Shot: Right
- Played for: CSKA Moscow; Torpedo Gorky; Oji Seishi
- Playing career: 1967–1988
Medal record
Men's ice hockey
Representing Soviet Union
World Championships
Gold medal – first place	1975 West Germany
Gold medal – first place	1978 Czechoslovakia

Yuri Fedorov (born July 8, 1949) is a Russian retired ice hockey defenceman. He played in the Soviet Hockey League for CSKA Moscow and Torpedo (Gorky) which is now known as Torpedo Nizhny Novgorod. He also played in the Japan Ice Hockey League for Oji Seishi. He was inducted into the Russian and Soviet Hockey Hall of Fame in 1978.
