= Sergei Gimayev =

Sergei Gimayev may refer to:

- Sergei Gimayev (ice hockey, born 1955) (1955–2017), Soviet professional ice hockey player
- Sergei Gimayev (ice hockey, born 1984), Russian professional ice hockey player
