= Irek Gimayev =

Russian ice hockey player

- Born: September 2, 1957 (age 68) Sukkulovo, Russian SFSR, Soviet Union
- Height: 5 ft 10 in (178 cm)
- Weight: 194 lb (88 kg; 13 st 12 lb)
- Position: Defence
- Shot: Left
- Played for: Salavat Yulaev Ufa; HC CSKA Moscow; Oji Seishi; HK Olimpija Ljubljana
- National team: Soviet Union
- Playing career: 1973–1992

Irek Faritovich Gimayev (Russian: Ирек Фаритович Гимаев, Bashkir: Ирек Фәрит улы Ғимаев; born September 2, 1957, in Sukkulovo, Russian SFSR, Soviet Union) is a Russian retired ice hockey defenceman.

Gimayev played in the Soviet Hockey League for Salavat Yulaev Ufa and HC CSKA Moscow. He was inducted into the Russian and Soviet Hockey Hall of Fame in 1982 and is also an Honoured Master of Sport of the USSR. He is an ethnic Tatar.
