= Pavel Zhiburtovich =

Soviet ice hockey player

Pavel Zhiburtovich (September 8, 1925, Samara, Russia – February 21, 2006, Moscow) was an ice hockey player who played in the Soviet Hockey League. He played for HC CSKA Moscow. He was inducted into the Russian and Soviet Hockey Hall of Fame in 1953.

His older brother Yuri died in a crash, 1950. Pavel replaced him in the team.
