= Vladimir Brezhnev =

Soviet ice hockey player

Vladimir Brezhnev (March 5, 1935 – March 20, 1996) was an ice hockey player who played in the Soviet Hockey League. He played for HC CSKA Moscow. He was inducted into the Russian and Soviet Hockey Hall of Fame in 1965. He was born and died in Moscow.
