= Boris Petelin =

Soviet ice hockey player 1924–1990

Boris Petelin (15 August 1924 – 1990) was a Russian retired ice hockey player who played in the Soviet Hockey League. He played for HC Dynamo Moscow. He was inducted into the Russian and Soviet Hockey Hall of Fame in 1954. He was born in Magadan.

He died on June 23, 1990 in Moscow. He was buried at the Golovinskoye cemetery (section No 19).
