= Sukkulovo =

Sukkulovo Суккулово
- Selo
- Location within Bashkortostan Location within Russia
- Coordinates: 55°25′N 54°54′E
- Country: Russia
- Region: Bashkortostan
- District: Dyurtyulinsky District
- Time zone: UTC+5:00

Sukkulovo (Russian: Суккулово; Bashkir: Һыуыҡҡул, Hıwıqqul) is a rural locality (a selo) and the administrative centre of Sukkulovsky Selsoviet, Dyurtyulinsky District, Bashkortostan, Russia. The population was 825 as of 2010. There are 11 streets.

== Geography ==
Sukkulovo is located 9 km southeast of Dyurtyuli (the district's administrative centre) by road. Mamadalevo is the nearest rural locality.
