= Valeri Nikitin (ice hockey) =

Soviet ice hockey player

Valeri Nikitin (June 20, 1939, in Moscow, Russia – January 13, 2002) was an ice hockey player who played in the Soviet Hockey League and National Hockey League. He played for HC Khimik Voskresensk. He was inducted into the Russian and Soviet Hockey Hall of Fame in 1967.
