= Alexander Ivanov-Kramskoi =

Soviet classical guitarist (1912–1973)

- Born: 8 September 1912
- Origin: Moscow, Russian Empire
- Died: 11 April 1973 (aged 60)
- Genres: classical guitar
- Occupations: guitarist, composer, conductor, pedagog
- Instrument: six-string guitar

Alexander Mikhailovich Ivanov-Kramskoy (sometimes spelt: Alexandr Mikhaylovich Ivanov-Kramskoi) (in Russian: Александр Михайлович Иванов-Крамской) (26 August [September 8], 1912, Moscow – 11 April 1973, Minsk) was a Soviet classical guitarist, composer, conductor, teacher, esteemed artist of Russian Federation (1959). His original last name was Ivanov.

== Biography ==
He began to study violin at the Music School (currently Igumnov Music School), but after having heard Andres Segovia play in Moscow State Conservatory in 1926, he switched to six-string guitar.

In 1930, he got into October Revolution Music School to study with Peter Agafoshin (who was part of the International Union of Guitarists). He also studied composition with Nikolai Rechmensky and conducting with Konstantin Saradzhev. Later on, he continued his studies with Agafoshin in Moscow Conservatory (на курсах повышения квалификации).

He first appeared on Soviet Radio in 1932. Later on, he worked in Maly Theatre. In 1939—1945 conducted the Soviet NKVD Choir, and in 1946—1952 he conducted the folk instrument orchestra of Gosteleradio studio.

In 1939, he got the second prize at the Soviet folk instrumentalists competition. He recorded 40 LPs as a guitarist and conductor.

Ivanov-Kramskoy accompanied singers, including Nadezhda Obukhova, Ivan Kozlovsky, Alexandra Yablochkina, and also played with Beethoven and Komitas string quartets, with Leonid Kogan, Alexandre Korneyev and other famous musicians.

In 1936 Ivanov-Kramskoy wrote his first piece "Lyrical waltz for solo guitar". This waltz became extremely popular with Russian guitarists. Ivanov-Kramskoy composed over five hundred works for guitar: two concerts, sonatas, folk song arrangements, and many original pieces. His music was used in the movie «Несрочная весна».

Ivanov-Kramskoy gave many concerts for soldiers during World War II.

When the war was over, Ivanov-Kramskoy - being the first Russian concert guitarist — had to fight for the future of classical guitar, trying to restore the class of classical guitar which was cancelled in the middle of the 30-ies.
