= 2017–18 KHL season =

- League: Kontinental Hockey League
- Sport: Ice hockey
- Duration: 21 August 2017 – 22 April 2018
- Games: 56
- Teams: 27

Regular season
- Continental Cup winner: SKA Saint Petersburg
- Season MVP: Nikita Gusev (SKA Saint Petersburg)
- Top scorer: Ilya Kovalchuk (SKA Saint Petersburg)

Gagarin Cup
- Champions: Ak Bars Kazan
- Runners-up: CSKA Moscow
- Finals MVP: Justin Azevedo (Ak Bars Kazan)

KHL seasons
- ← 2016–17 2018–19 →

The 2017–18 KHL season was the tenth season of the Kontinental Hockey League. The season started on 21 August 2017 and ended on 22 April 2018.

The league accommodated a 33 day Olympic break, to allow its players to participate in the 2018 Winter Olympics in February.

== Team changes ==
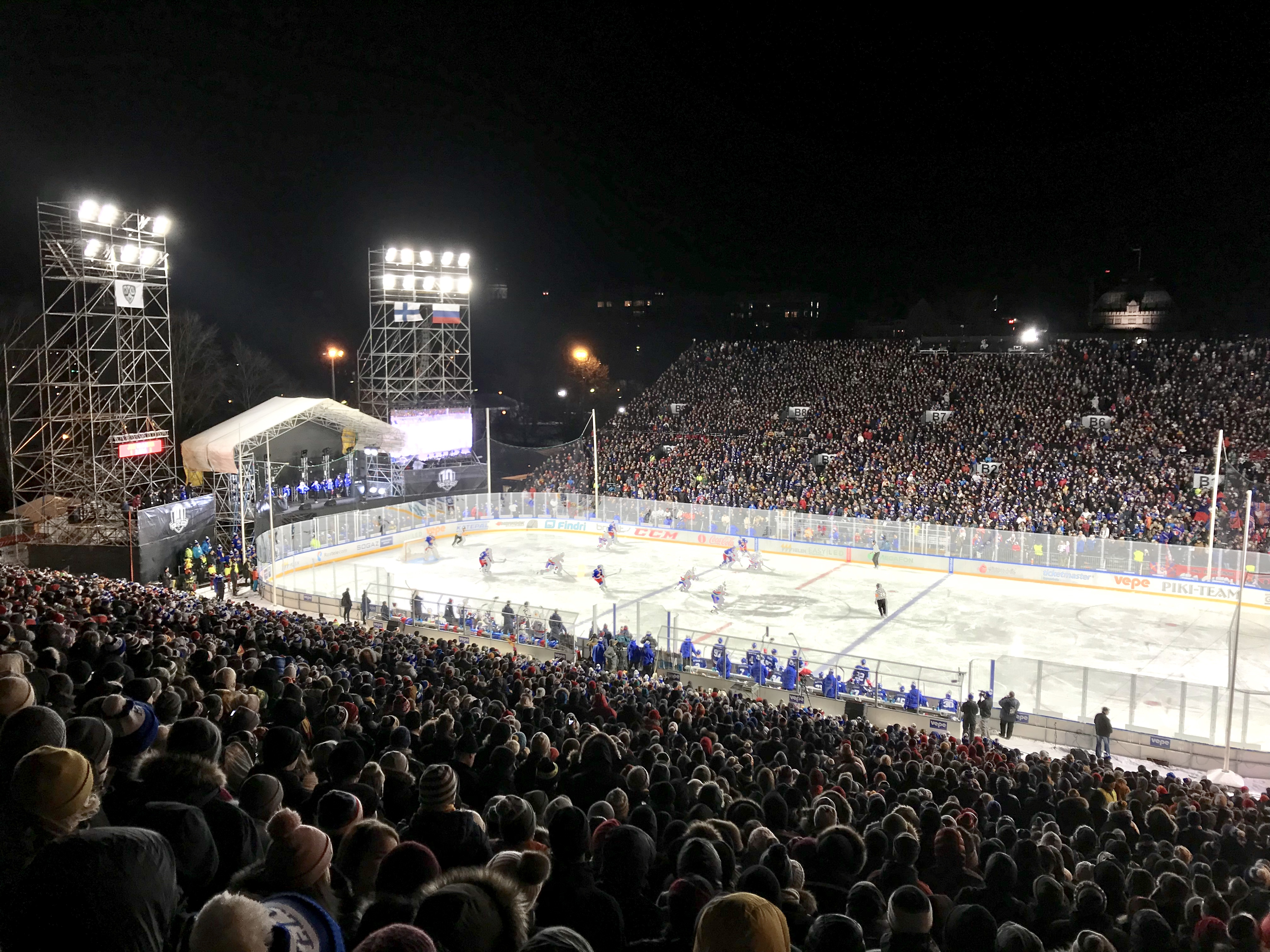
Jokerit - SKA in Helsinki Ice Challenge with KHL record attendance (17,645).

The Croatian club Medveščak Zagreb relocated back to the Austrian Hockey League, and Russian club Metallurg Novokuznetsk was relegated to the Supreme Hockey League, to bring the total number of KHL teams to 27.

March 2018 KHL announced that two teams going to drop out after this season and next season have 25 teams. Yugra and Lada Togliatti are the teams that will not continue in KHL.

== Divisions and regular season format ==
In this season, like in the 2016–17 season, each team will play every other team once at home and once on the road, giving a total of 52 games (26 at home, 26 on the road), plus 4 additional games (2 at home, 2 on the road) played by each team against rival clubs from its own conference. Thus, each team played a total of 56 games in the regular season.

How the teams are divided into divisions and conferences is shown in the table below.

Western Conference	Eastern Conference

Bobrov Division	Tarasov Division	Kharlamov Division	Chernyshev Division
(Belarus) Dinamo Minsk	(Russia) CSKA Moscow	(Russia) Ak Bars Kazan	(Russia) Admiral Vladivostok
(Latvia) Dinamo Riga	(Russia) Dynamo Moscow	(Russia) Avtomobilist Yekaterinburg	(Russia) Amur Khabarovsk
(Finland) Jokerit	(Russia) HC Sochi	(Russia) Lada Togliatti	(Russia) Avangard Omsk
(Russia) SKA Saint Petersburg	(Russia) Lokomotiv Yaroslavl	(Russia) Metallurg Magnitogorsk	(Kazakhstan) Barys Astana
(Slovakia) Slovan Bratislava	(Russia) Severstal Cherepovets	(Russia) Neftekhimik Nizhnekamsk	(China) HC Kunlun Red Star
(Russia) Spartak Moscow	(Russia) Torpedo Nizhny Novgorod	(Russia) Traktor Chelyabinsk	(Russia) Salavat Yulaev Ufa
	(Russia) Vityaz Podolsk	(Russia) Yugra Khanty-Mansiysk	(Russia) Sibir Novosibirsk

== League standings ==
=== Western Conference ===
Pos	Team	Pld	W	OTW	OTL	L	GF	GA	GD	Pts	Qualification
1	SKA Saint Petersburg	56	40	7	4	5	227	97	+130	138	Advance to Gagarin Cup Playoffs (Note: Teams leading a division hold one of the first two places of their conference.)
2	CSKA Moscow	56	35	9	1	11	175	89	+86	124	Advance to Gagarin Cup Playoffs
3	Jokerit	56	29	4	8	15	151	108	+43	103	Advance to Gagarin Cup Playoffs
4	Lokomotiv Yaroslavl	56	26	9	3	18	148	129	+19	99	Advance to Gagarin Cup Playoffs
5	Torpedo Nizhny Novgorod	56	23	6	8	19	116	127	−11	89	Advance to Gagarin Cup Playoffs
6	HC Sochi	56	22	7	7	20	130	138	−8	87	Advance to Gagarin Cup Playoffs
7	Spartak Moscow	56	22	7	5	22	153	146	+7	85	Advance to Gagarin Cup Playoffs
8	Severstal Cherepovets	56	18	9	11	18	131	145	−14	83	Advance to Gagarin Cup Playoffs
9	Dynamo Moscow	56	19	9	5	23	134	139	−5	80	
10	Dinamo Minsk	56	20	5	3	28	112	129	−17	73	
11	Vityaz Podolsk	56	17	4	8	27	131	160	−29	67	
12	Slovan Bratislava	56	15	3	7	31	119	187	−68	58	
13	Dinamo Riga	56	9	7	9	31	105	153	−48	50	

Updated to match(es) played on 1 March 2018. Source: KHL
Rules for classification: 1) points; 2) a higher number of wins in the regular time; 3) a higher number of wins in overtime and shootouts; 4) goal difference; 5) number of goals scored; 6) drawing of lots.

=== Eastern Conference ===
Pos	Team	Pld	W	OTW	OTL	L	GF	GA	GD	Pts	Qualification
1	Ak Bars Kazan	56	30	2	6	18	158	126	+32	100	Advance to Gagarin Cup Playoffs (Note: Teams leading a division hold one of the first two places of its conference.)
2	Salavat Yulaev Ufa	56	26	5	5	20	151	139	+12	93	Advance to Gagarin Cup Playoffs
3	Traktor Chelyabinsk	56	26	7	4	19	129	121	+8	96	Advance to Gagarin Cup Playoffs
4	Avtomobilist Yekaterinburg	56	25	6	8	17	165	137	+28	95	Advance to Gagarin Cup Playoffs
5	Metallurg Magnitogorsk	56	24	8	7	17	150	135	+15	95	Advance to Gagarin Cup Playoffs
6	Neftekhimik Nizhnekamsk	56	27	3	7	19	135	135	0	94	Advance to Gagarin Cup Playoffs
7	Avangard Omsk	56	22	7	8	19	146	116	+30	88	Advance to Gagarin Cup Playoffs
8	Amur Khabarovsk	56	21	8	9	18	132	141	−9	88	Advance to Gagarin Cup Playoffs
9	Sibir Novosibirsk	56	23	8	2	23	136	135	+1	87	
10	Barys Astana	56	19	5	7	25	148	164	−16	74	
11	Admiral Vladivostok	56	16	5	5	30	120	145	−25	63	
12	Kunlun Red Star	56	15	4	8	29	103	146	−43	61	
13	Lada Togliatti	56	12	4	6	34	105	149	−44	50	
14	Yugra Khanty-Mansiysk	56	7	10	7	32	93	167	−74	48	

Updated to match(es) played on 1 March 2018. Source: KHL
Rules for classification: 1) points; 2) a higher number of wins in the regular time; 3) a higher number of wins in overtime and shootouts; 4) goal difference; 5) number of goals scored; 6) drawing of lots.

== Gagarin Cup playoffs ==
Conference Quarterfinals	Conference Semifinals
1	(Russia) Ak Bars	4
8	(Russia) Amur	1
1	(Russia) Ak Bars	4
5	(Russia) Metallurg Mg	1
2	(Russia) Salavat Yulaev	4
7	(Russia) Avangard	3
Eastern Conference
3	(Russia) Traktor	4
6	(Russia) Neftekhimik	1
2	(Russia) Salavat Yulaev	3
3	(Russia) Traktor	4
4	(Russia) Avtomobilist	2
5	(Russia) Metallurg Mg	4
1	(Russia) SKA	4
8	(Russia) Severstal	0
1	(Russia) SKA	4
4	(Russia) Lokomotiv	1
2	(Russia) CSKA	4
7	(Russia) Spartak	0
Western Conference
3	(Finland) Jokerit	4
6	(Russia) Sochi	1
2	(Russia) CSKA	4
3	(Finland) Jokerit	2
4	(Russia) Lokomotiv	4
5	(Russia) Torpedo	0

Conference Finals
1	(Russia) Ak Bars	4
3	(Russia) Traktor	0
1	(Russia) SKA	2
2	(Russia) CSKA	4

Gagarin Cup Finals
E1	(Russia) Ak Bars	4
W2	(Russia) CSKA	1

== Final standings ==
Rank	Team
1	(Russia) Ak Bars Kazan
2	(Russia) CSKA Moscow
3	(Russia) SKA Saint Petersburg
4	(Russia) Traktor Chelyabinsk
5	(Finland) Jokerit
6	(Russia) Lokomotiv Yaroslavl
7	(Russia) Metallurg Magnitogorsk
8	(Russia) Salavat Yulaev Ufa
9	(Russia) Avtomobilist Yekaterinburg
10	(Russia) Neftekhimik Nizhnekamsk
11	(Russia) Torpedo Nizhny Novgorod
12	(Russia) Avangard Omsk
13	(Russia) Amur Khabarovsk
14	(Russia) HC Sochi
15	(Russia) Spartak Moscow
16	(Russia) Severstal Cherepovets
17	(Russia) Sibir Novosibirsk
18	(Russia) Dynamo Moscow
19	(Kazakhstan) Barys Astana
20	(Belarus) Dinamo Minsk
21	(Russia) Vityaz Podolsk
22	(Russia) Admiral Vladivostok
23	(China) Kunlun Red Star
24	(Slovakia) Slovan Bratislava
25	(Russia) Lada Togliatti
26	(Latvia) Dinamo Riga
27	(Russia) Yugra Khanty-Mansiysk

== Player statistics ==
=== Scoring leaders ===
As of 1 March 2018

Player	Team	GP	G	A	Pts	+/–	PIM
(Russia) Ilya Kovalchuk	SKA Saint Petersburg	53	31	32	63	+12	26
(Russia) Nikita Gusev	SKA Saint Petersburg	54	22	40	62	+25	2
(Kazakhstan) Nigel Dawes	Barys Astana	46	35	21	56	+5	26
(Sweden) Linus Omark	Salavat Yulaev Ufa	55	16	39	55	+6	60
(Canada) Linden Vey	Barys Astana	50	17	35	52	+1	64

Source: KHL

=== Leading goaltenders ===
As of 1 March 2018

Player	Team	GP	Min	W	L	SOP	GA	SO	SV%	GAA
(Sweden) Lars Johansson	CSKA Moscow	21	1192:53	15	4	0	26	6	.938	1.31
(Finland) Mikko Koskinen	SKA Saint Petersburg	29	1718:12	22	4	1	45	5	.937	1.57
(Russia) Ilya Sorokin	CSKA Moscow	37	2182:35	25	8	4	58	8	.931	1.59
(Russia) Igor Shestyorkin	SKA Saint Petersburg	28	1592:34	20	4	4	45	7	.933	1.70
(United States) Ryan Zapolski	Jokerit	39	2352:26	24	11	4	69	9	.931	1.76

Source: KHL

== Awards ==
=== Players of the Month ===
Best KHL players of each month.

Month	Goaltender	Defence	Forward	Rookie
September	(Russia) Stanislav Galimov (Torpedo Nizhny Novgorod)	(Sweden) Patrik Hersley (SKA Saint Petersburg)	(Kazakhstan) Nigel Dawes (Barys Astana)	(Finland) Eeli Tolvanen (Jokerit)
October	(United States) Ryan Zapolski (Jokerit)	(Russia) Nikita Tryamkin (Avtomobilist Jekaterinburg)	(Kazakhstan) Nigel Dawes (Barys Astana)	(Finland) Eeli Tolvanen (Jokerit)
November	(Russia) Vasily Koshechkin (Metallurg Magnitogorsk)	(Russia) Nikita Tryamkin (Avtomobilist Jekaterinburg)	(Canada) Zach Boychuk (Slovan Bratislava)	(Russia) Alexander Petunin (Dynamo Moscow)
December	(Russia) Ilya Sorokin (CSKA Moscow)	(Russia) Oleg Piganovich (Neftekhimik Nizhnekamsk)	(Sweden) Alexander Bergström (Sibir Novosibirsk)	(Russia) Alexander Petunin (Dynamo Moscow)
January	(Czech Republic) Pavel Francouz (Traktor Chelyabinsk)	(Denmark) Philip Larsen (Salavat Yulaev Ufa)	(Russia) Alexander Khokhlachev (Spartak Moscow)	(Russia) Rafael Bikmullin (Neftekhimik Nizhnekamsk)
March	(Russia) Ilya Sorokin (CSKA Moscow)	(Belarus) Nick Bailen (Traktor Chelyabinsk)	(Canada) Justin Azevedo (Ak Bars Kazan)	(Russia) Vitali Kravtsov (Traktor Chelyabinsk)
April	(Sweden) Lars Johansson (CSKA Moscow)	(Russia) Vasili Tokranov (Ak Bars Kazan)	(Canada) Justin Azevedo (Ak Bars Kazan)	(Russia) Vitali Kravtsov (Traktor Chelyabinsk)
