= Victor Tsyplakov =

Soviet ice hockey player

Victor Tsyplakov (born December 9, 1937, in Moscow, Russia) is a retired ice hockey player who played in the Soviet Hockey League. He played for HK Lokomotiv Moscow. He was inducted into the Russian and Soviet Hockey Hall of Fame in 1969.
