= Viktor Zozulin =

Russian actor (1944–2022)

- Виктор Зозулин
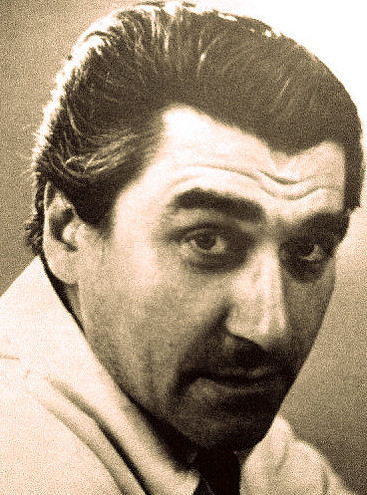
- Born: 10 October 1944; Moscow, Russian SFSR, USSR
- Died: 16 August 2022 (aged 77); Moscow, Russia
- Occupation(s): Film and theatre actor

Viktor Viktorovich Zozulin (Russian: Виктор Викторович Зозулин; 10 October 1944 – 16 August 2022) was a Russian film and theatre actor.

== Biography ==
Zozulin attended the Boris Shchukin Theatre Institute, which he had finished with honours. He then earned some invitations to at least seven theaters. Zozulin had played as Calaf in the play Princess Turandot, which was considered one of his first known roles. He worked in Vakhtangov Theatre for more than 55 years. He had played numerous roles during his film and theatre career. Zozulin was a recipient of the Honored Artist of the RSFSR. He was also honored with the title of the People's Artist of Russia.

He was famous for playing radio technician Kostya, the friend of one of the main characters of Operation Y and Shurik's Other Adventures.

Zozulin died of illness in August 2022, at the age of 77.
