= Aleksandr Ivanov (footballer, born 1972) =

Russian footballer

Personal information
- Full name: Aleksandr Vasilyevich Ivanov
- Date of birth: 4 August 1972 (age 54)
- Height: 1.77 m (5 ft 9 1/2 in)
- Positions: Defender; midfielder

Youth career
- FC Mashuk Pyatigorsk

Senior career*
Years	Team	Apps	(Gls)
1989–1990	FC Mashuk Pyatigorsk	2	(0)
1990	FC Druzhba Budyonnovsk (amateur)		
1991	FC Druzhba Budyonnovsk	15	(0)
1992	FC Mashuk Pyatigorsk	30	(1)
1993	FC Dynamo Stavropol	2	(0)
1993–1997	FC Mashuk Pyatigorsk	125	(11)
1997–1998	FC Volga Ulyanovsk	42	(2)
1999–2001	FC Kavkazkabel Prokhladny	91	(5)
2001	FC Kristall Maysky		
2002	FC Dynamo Stavropol	13	(2)
2002–2006	FC Vodnik Rostov-on-Don		
2010	FC Dongazdobycha-2 Sulin		
- * Club domestic league appearances and goals

Aleksandr Vasilyevich Ivanov (Russian: Александр Васильевич Иванов; born 4 August 1972) is a former Russian football player.

Ivanov played in the Russian Premier League with FC Dynamo Stavropol.
