= Traktor Chelyabinsk =

Ice hockey team in Chelyabinsk, Russia

- City: Chelyabinsk, Russia
- League: KHL; 2008–present: Russian Superleague 1996–1999, 2006–2008; Vysshaya Liga 1999–2006; IHL 1992–1996; Soviet League Class A 1948–1965, 1968–1992; Soviet League Class A2 1965–1968
- Conference: Eastern
- Division: Kharlamov
- Founded: 1947
- Home arena: Traktor Ice Arena (capacity: 7,500)
- Colours
- General manager: Alexei Volkov
- Head coach: Scott Gordon
- Captain: Mikhail Grigorenko
- Affiliates: Chelmet Chelyabinsk (VHL); Belye Medvedi (MHL)
- Website: hctraktor.org

Franchise history
- 1948–1953: Dzerzhinets
- 1954–1958: Avangard
- 1958–present: Traktor Chelyabinsk

Traktor Chelyabinsk, also known as Traktor, or HC Traktor Chelyabinsk, (Russian: ХК Трактор Челябинск; Трактор) is a professional ice hockey club based in Chelyabinsk, Russia. It is a member of the Kharlamov Division in the Kontinental Hockey League (KHL). From 1967 to 2009, the team played its home games at the Yunost Sport Palace. Since 2009, the club has played in Traktor Ice Arena named after Valery Belousov.

== History ==
=== Soviet Championship (1948–1992) ===
Founded in 1947 as a team of the Chelyabinsk Tractor Plant, Traktor have played for the Soviet and Russian championships since 1948. From 1948 to 1953, the team was called Dzerzhinets, and it was called Avangard from 1954 to 1958. The current name was adopted during the 1958–59 season.

Traktor played its first game in the top league on December 12, 1948 against CDKA Moscow. Viktor Shuvalov, a future star of Moscow clubs VVS and CSKA, led the team in scores during its first season in the championship. In 1955 Chelyabinsk reached the fourth place for the first time (back then a medal table still was dominated by the Moscow teams).

In 1965 - 1968, Traktor played in the second division of the Soviet hockey championships. The team returned to the first division in 1968. In 1973, Traktor played in the USSR Cup finals against the CSKA. Although Traktor led 2–0, they lost the game with a score of 5–2. In the 1976-77 season Traktor won bronze in the Soviet hockey championships, the team's highest achievement during the Soviet period of its history.

At that time, Traktor produced several players who achieved international prominence. One of the best Soviet forwards of all times, Sergei Makarov, was born in Chelyabinsk and began his career in Traktor. Along his teammate, defenseman Sergei Starikov, he regularly played on the Soviet national team from the late 1970s to the mid-1980s. Starikov and Makarov each won over 10 international tournaments with Team USSR.

=== International League and Russian Superleague years (1992–2008) ===
In the early 1990s, Traktor twice finished third in the International Hockey League under head coach Valery Belousov. A group of Traktor players, including Sergei Gomolyako, Valeri Karpov, Igor Varitsky, Ravil Gusmanov and others, appeared on Team Russia at several world championships.

During the late 1990s ice hockey in Chelyabinsk entered a period of decline. In 1998 Traktor was relegated to the Vysshaya Liga and was replaced in its role as the major hockey team of Chelyabinsk by Mechel. The team found its way back to the elite only in 2006. Coached by Gennady Tsygurov they won the second division championship earning promotion to the Russian Superleague.

After the 2006–07 season, Tsygurov resigned. He was replaced by Andrei Nazarov, a native of Chelyabinsk who had spent 13 seasons in the NHL as an enforcer. Although he succeeded at securing Traktor's place in the top league, Nazarov's coaching style led Traktor to a new world record in overall penalty minutes in a single game that was set after the mass brawl versus Ak Bars Kazan in January 2008.

=== First seasons in the KHL (2008–2010) ===
During 2008–09 KHL season Traktor was reinforced by its alumni Ravil Gusmanov and NHL star Oleg Kvasha. Despite a good start Chelyabinsk finished the regular season with disappointing results and eventually failed to advance in the playoffs further than the first round losing the series to Atlant Moscow Oblast with an overall score 13–2. Kvasha was named the team's MVP of the season. 2009 was also notable for the club's move to the Arena Traktor. The first game in the new arena, played against Metallurg Magnitogorsk, was won by 3–2. The first player to score a goal was defenceman Andre Lakos.

Before the 2009–10 season the team had to face budget cuts and lose its biggest stars including Oleg Kvasha and Evgenii Dadonov. After an unstable performance in the regular season the team advanced to the playoffs with the lowest seed ultimately losing to its natural rival Metallurg Magnitogorsk in the first round.

=== Return of Belousov (2010–present) ===
During the 2010 off-season Nazarov left to coach infamous Vityaz Chekhov and was replaced by Andrei Sidorenko who was fired off his job right after the disastrous start of the season. In October 2010 Valery Belousov returned as Traktor's head coach, but, nonetheless, during the 2010–11 the team failed to make the playoffs.

After the lackluster season the team finally fixing its financial issues seriously rearranged the roster with future stars such as Vladimir Antipov, Stanislav Chistov, Jan Bulis, Petri Kontiola and goaltender Michael Garnett. The results were immediate, Traktor became the best team of the 2011–12 regular season winning Continental Cup and taking bronze medals after losing to Avangard Omsk in Eastern Conference Finals. The biggest breakthrough of the season was a young winger Evgeny Kuznetsov who led the team in points. Another homegrown Chelyabinsk player, Konstantin Panov, who returned to Traktor after five seasons of absence, became the team's goal scoring leader.

Traktor kept all of its leaders for the 2012–13 season. Unlike many other clubs in the league Chelyabinsk did not sign any NHL players who were returning to Europe during the NHL lockout. Facing much stronger competition this time Traktor finished the regular season in the third place of the Eastern Conference. Kuznetsov continued his successful career leading the team in points, goals and assists. 17 years old forward Valeri Nichushkin became that season's major breakthrough for Chelyabinsk, later in 2013 he won the Cherepanov Trophy as the KHL's Rookie of the Year and was picked in the top 10 of the NHL entry draft by the Dallas Stars.

On its way to the Gagarin Cup Finals Traktor had to endure three seven game series against Barys Astana, Avangard Omsk and Ak Bars Kazan, all three of those rounds were won back by the team from the position of 3-1 down in the series. One of the main components of the success was goaltender Michael Garnett who had 5 shutouts during the post-season and GAA of 1.86. However, the team was less fortunate in the final games played versus the defending champions Dynamo Moscow. Failing to take the lead in the series Traktor ultimately lost it 4–2.

== Season-by-season KHL record ==
Note: GP = Games played, W = Wins, L = Losses, OTW = Overtime/shootout wins, OTL = Overtime/shootout losses, Pts = Points, GF = Goals for, GA = Goals against

Season	GP	W	OTW	L	OTL	Pts	GF	GA	Finish	Top scorer	Playoffs
2008–09	56	24	2	22	8	84	142	166	4th, Tarasov	Andrei Nikolishin (39 points: 10 G, 29 A; 48 GP)	Lost in preliminary round, 0–3 (Atlant Moscow Oblast)
2009–10	56	18	3	31	5	64	137	192	4th, Kharlamov	Evgeny Skachkov (36 points: 22 G, 11 A; 51 GP)	Lost in Conference Quarterfinals, 1–3 (Metallurg Magnitogorsk)
2010–11	54	14	8	26	6	64	142	166	5th, Kharlamov	Deron Quint (32 points: 21 G, 11 A; 53 GP)	Did not qualify
2011–12	54	32	7	11	4	114	163	116	1st, Kharlamov	Evgeny Kuznetsov (41 points: 19 G, 22 A; 49 GP)	Lost in Conference Finals, 1–4 (Avangard Omsk)
2012–13	52	28	3	13	8	98	152	120	2nd, Kharlamov	Evgeny Kuznetsov (44 points: 19 G, 25 A; 51 GP)	Lost in Gagarin Cup Finals, 2–4 (Dynamo Moscow)
2013–14	54	18	7	22	7	75	126	148	5th, Kharlamov	Petri Kontiola (37 points: 15 G, 22 A; 53 GP)	Did not qualify
2014–15	60	21	8	24	7	86	144	154	3rd, Kharlamov	Anton Glinkin (38 points: 13 G, 25 A; 54 GP)	Lost in Conference Quarterfinals, 2–4 (Sibir Novosibirsk)
2015–16	60	17	12	23	8	83	132	151	5th, Kharlamov	Alexander Rybakov (27 points: 9 G, 18 A; 55 GP)	Did not qualify
2016–17	60	27	3	20	10	97	130	120	3rd, Kharlamov	Paul Szczechura (41 points: 14 G, 27 A; 60 GP)	Lost in Conference Quarterfinals, 2–4 (Barys Astana)
2017–18	56	26	7	19	4	96	129	121	2nd, Kharlamov	Paul Szczechura (42 points: 20 G, 22 A; 55 GP)	Lost in Conference Finals, 0–4 (Ak Bars Kazan)
2018–19	62	18	9	31	4	58	102	151	5th, Kharlamov	Ryan Stoa (27 points: 11 G, 16 A; 59 GP)	Lost in Conference Quarterfinals, 0–4 (Avtomobilist Yekaterinburg)
2019–20	62	20	5	31	6	56	132	161	6th, Kharlamov	Lukáš Sedlák (40 points: 23 G, 17 A; 57 GP)	Did not qualify
2020–21	60	27	7	20	6	74	157	143	3rd, Kharlamov	Tomáš Hyka (49 points: 14 G, 35 A; 59 GP)	Lost in Conference Quarterfinals, 1–4 (Salavat Yulaev Ufa)
2021–22	49	22	12	12	3	71	152	119	2nd, Kharlamov	Lukáš Sedlák (43 points: 18 G, 25 A; 49 GP)	Lost in Conference Finals, 1–4 (Metallurg Magnitogorsk)
2022–23	68	23	8	27	10	72	169	190	5th, Kharlamov	Anton Burdasov (46 points: 19 G, 27 A; 48 GP)	Did not qualify
2023–24	68	27	10	25	6	80	163	157	4th, Kharlamov	Maxim Shabanov (50 points: 25 G, 25 A; 64 GP)	Lost in Semifinals, 0–4 (Lokomotiv Yaroslavl)
2024–25	68	38	7	17	6	96	223	159	1st, Kharlamov	Maxim Shabanov (67 points: 23 G, 44 A; 65 GP)	Lost in Gagarin Cup Finals, 1–4 (Lokomotiv Yaroslavl)
2025–26	68	28	5	26	9	75	205	195	4th, Kharlamov	Josh Leivo (65 points: 26 G, 39 A; 62 GP)	Lost in Conference Quarterfinals, 1–4 (Ak Bars Kazan)

== Players ==
=== Current roster ===
As of 29 July 2026

No.	Nat	Player	Pos	S/G	Age	Acquired	Birthplace
20	(Russia)	Sergei Mylnikov	G	L	27	2024	Chelyabinsk, Russia
40	(Russia)	Saveliy Sherstnyov	G	L	24	2020	Chelyabinsk, Russia
70	(Russia)	Dmitry Nikolayev	G	L	26	2026	Saint Petersburg, Russia
80	(Russia)	Artemy Sokolov	G	L	18	2025	Chelyabinsk, Russia
–	(Norway)	Henrik Haukeland	G	L	31	2026	Fredrikstad, Norway
2	(Russia)	Grigori Dronov (A)	D	L	28	2016	Magnitogorsk, Russia
9	(Russia)	Vladislav Valentsov	D	L	29	2026	Chelyabinsk, Russia
18	(Belarus)	Dominik Mikanovich	D	L	20	2025	Chelyabinsk, Russia
42	(Russia)	Vladislav Yusupov	D	L	21	2025	Chelyabinsk, Russia
48	(Russia)	Arseniy Koromyslov	D	L	22	2023	Chelyabinsk, Russia
72	(Russia)	Sergei Telegin (A)	D	L	25	2026	Moscow, Russia
82	(Russia)	Andrei Pribylsky	D	R	25	2026	Chelyabinsk, Russia
89	(Russia)	Yaroslav Fedoseyev	D	R	18	2026	Chelyabinsk, Russia
7	(Russia)	Maxim Dzhioshvili	F	R	30	2025	Moscow, Russia
10	(Russia)	Artemy Nizameyev	F	R	21	2025	Moscow, Russia
12	(Russia)	Alexander Rykov	F	L	21	2026	Chelyabinsk, Russia
25	(Russia)	Vladimir Zharkov	F	L	38	2026	Moscow, Russia
33	(Russia)	Alexei Rykmanov	F	L	22	2026	Moscow, Russia
45	(Russia)	Mikhail Goryunov-Rolgeizer	F	L	23	2025	Chelyabinsk, Russia
52	(Russia)	Alexander Kisakov	F	L	23	2026	Chelyabinsk, Russia
74	(Russia)	Vitali Kravtsov	F	L	26	2024	Vladivostok, Russia
83	(Russia)	Stepan Gorbunov	F	L	20	2025	Chelyabinsk, Russia
87	(Russia)	Andrei Svetlakov (A)	F	L	30	2026	Moscow, Russia
94	(Russia)	Mikhail Grigorenko (A)	F	L	32	2024	Khabarovsk, Russia
95	(Russia)	Ruslan Aglamzyanov	F	L	22	2024	Chelyabinsk, Russia
–	(Canada)	Nathan Legare	F	R	25	2026	Saint-Jean-sur-Richelieu, Quebec, Canada

=== Head coaches ===
- (Soviet Union) Viktor Vasiliev, 1948–52
- (Soviet Union) Vasily Karelin, 1952–54
- (Soviet Union) Sergei Zakhvatov, 1954–62
- (Soviet Union) Nikolai Sidorenko, 1962–64
- (Soviet Union) Aleksandr Novokreshchenov, 1964
- (Soviet Union) Viktor Stolyarov, 1964–65
- (Soviet Union) Vladislav Smirnov, 1965
- (Soviet Union) Albert Danilov, 1965–66
- (Soviet Union) Viktor Stolyarov, 1968–73
- (Soviet Union) Albert Danilov, 1973–74
- (Soviet Union) Anatoly Kostryukov, 1974–78
- (Soviet Union) Gennadi Tsygurov, 1978–84
- (Soviet Union) Anatoly Shustov, 1984–87
- (Soviet Union) Gennadi Tsygurov, 1987–90
- (Russia) Valery Belousov, 1990–95
- (Russia) Anatoly Kartaev, 1995
- (Russia) Sergei Grigorkin, 1995–99
- (Russia) Anatoly Timofeev, 2000–01
- (Russia) Sergei Paramonov, 2001
- (Russia) Aleksandr Glazkov, 2001–02
- (Russia) Nikolai Makarov, 2002–03
- (Russia) Anatoly Timofeev, 2003–05
- (Ukraine) Anatoly Bogdanov, 2005
- (Russia) Gennadi Tsygurov, 2005–07
- (Russia) Andrei Nazarov, 2007–10
- (Belarus) Andrei Sidorenko, April 2010 - October 2010
- (Russia) Valery Belousov, 2010–2014
- (Finland) Karri Kivi, May 2014 - October 2014
- (Russia) Andrei Nikolishin, October 2014 – November 2015
- (Russia) Anvar Gatiyatulin, November 2015 – April 2018
- (Russia) German Titov, June 2018 – October 2018
- (Russia) Alexei Tertyshny, October 2018 – April 2019
- (Latvia) Pēteris Skudra, April 2019 – November 2019
- (Russia) Vladimir Yurzinov, November 2019 – April 2020
- (Russia) Anvar Gatiyatulin, April 2020 – October 2023
- (Russia) Alexey Zavarukhin, October 2023 – May 2024
- (Canada) Benoit Groulx, May 2024 – November 2025
- (Kazakhstan) Yevgeni Koreshkov, December 2025 – May 13 2026
- (United States) Scott Gordon, May 14 2026 – present

=== Honored members ===
Traktor Chelyabinsk hangs on the rafters of the Traktor Arena jerseys of all the Traktor players who have ever won the World Championship title, including the players who are currently active.

Traktor Chelyabinsk honored members
No	Player	Position	Career
1	Sergei Mylnikov	G	1976–89
4	Sergei Babinov	D	1972–75
7	Dmitri Kalinin	D	1995–98
8	Viktor Shuvalov	LW	1947–49
9	Igor Varitsky	F	1988–95, 2004–05
11	Evgeny Davydov	RW	1984–86
12	Sergei Starikov	D	1976–79
24	Sergei Makarov	RW	1976–78
24	Valeri Karpov	RW	1988–95, 2005–06
25	Konstantin Astrakhantsev	RW	1988–94
25	Andrei Sapozhnikov	D	1990–95, 1997–98
27	Vyacheslav Bykov	C	1980–82
28	Alexander Semin	RW	2001–02
30	Andrei Zuyev	G	1991–99, 2002–04
92	Evgeny Kuznetsov	RW	2009–

== Franchise records and leaders ==
=== All-time KHL scoring leaders ===
These are the top-ten point-scorers in franchise history. Figures are updated after each completed KHL regular season.

Note: Pos = Position; GP = Games played; G = Goals; A = Assists; Pts = Points; P/G = Points per game = current Traktor player

Points
Player	Pos	GP	G	A	Pts	P/G
(Russia) Anton Glinkin	LW	503	72	141	213	0.42
(Russia) Vitali Kravtsov	RW	330	95	101	196	0.59
(Russia) Andrei Popov	RW	458	89	80	169	0.37
(United States) Nick Bailen	D	254	48	108	156	0.61
(Russia) Maxim Shabanov	RW	207	67	83	150	0.72
(Russia) Evgeny Kuznetsov	C	210	65	81	146	0.70
(Russia) Maxim Yakutsenya	RW	276	56	82	138	0.50
(Russia) Vladimir Tkachyov	C	242	49	87	136	0.56
(Czech Republic) Lukáš Sedlák	C	164	57	64	121	0.74
(Czech Republic) Tomáš Hyka	RW	145	42	76	118	0.81

Goals
Player	Pos	G
(Russia) Vitali Kravtsov	RW	95
(Russia) Andrei Popov	RW	89
(Russia) Anton Glinkin	LW	72
(Russia) Maxim Shabanov	RW	67
(Russia) Evgeny Kuznetsov	C	65
(Czech Republic) Lukáš Sedlák	C	57
(Russia) Maxim Yakutsenya	RW	56
(United States) Deron Quint	D	50
(Russia) Vladimir Tkachyov	C	49
(United States) Nick Bailen	D	48

Assists
Player	Pos	A
(Russia) Anton Glinkin	LW	141
(United States) Nick Bailen	D	108
(Russia) Vitali Kravtsov	RW	101
(Russia) Vladimir Tkachyov	C	87
(Russia) Maxim Shabanov	RW	83
(Russia) Maxim Yakutsenya	RW	82
(Russia) Evgeny Kuznetsov	C	81
(Russia) Andrei Popov	RW	80
(Czech Republic) Tomáš Hyka	RW	76
(Russia) Sergei Telegin	D	73

== Honors ==
=== Champions ===
(gold) KHL Continental Cup (1): 2012
(gold) Vysshaya Liga Championship (1): 2006

=== Runners-up ===
(silver) Gagarin Cup (2): 2013, 2025
(bronze) Gagarin Cup (4): 2012, 2018, 2022, 2024
(silver) USSR Cup (1): 1973
(bronze) Soviet League Championship: 1977
(bronze) IHL Championship (2): 1993, 1994
(silver) Spengler Cup (1): 1973
