= Alexander Ivanov (TV presenter) =

Russian poet (1936–1996)

- Born: 9 December 1936; Moscow, RSFSR, Soviet Union
- Died: 12 June 1996 (aged 59); Moscow, Russia
- Occupations: poet, parodist, TV presenter
- Years active: 1961—1996
- Spouse: Olga Zabotkina

Alexander Alexandrovich Ivanov (Russian: Алекса́ндр Алекса́ндрович Ивано́в; December 9, 1936 — June 12, 1996) was a Soviet and Russian teacher, poet-parodist, permanent host of the cult TV show Around Laughter in the Soviet Union (1978-1991).

== Biography ==
Ivanov was born in Moscow into an artist's family.

In 1960 he graduated from the Faculty of Drawing of the Sholokhov Moscow State University for Humanities. He worked as a teacher of drawing and descriptive geometry.

In 1962, his creative career began. Ivanov owns a number of articles, pamphlets, and notes. In 1970 he was admitted to the Union of Soviet Writers.

In 1993 he signed the Letter of Forty-Two.

== Filmography ==
- The Secret of the Iron Door (1970) as traffic policeman
- A Rogue's Saga (1984) as cameo
- Two Arrows. Stone Age Detective (1989) as Gaunt
