= Aleksandr Ivanov (footballer, born 1973) =

Russian footballer

Personal information
- Full name: Aleksandr Anatolyevich Ivanov
- Date of birth: 14 April 1973 (age 53)
- Place of birth: Kolpino, Russian SFSR
- Height: 1.75 m (5 ft 9 in)
- Position: Midfielder

Youth career
- FC Izhorets Kolpino

Senior career*
Years	Team	Apps	(Gls)
1990–1993	FC Zenit Saint Petersburg	46	(4)
1993	→ FC Zenit-d Saint Petersburg	24	(5)
1994	FC Kavkazkabel Prokhladny	31	(4)
1995–1997	PFC Spartak Nalchik	108	(4)
1996–1997	→ PFC Spartak-2 Nalchik (loans)	4	(0)
1998–1999	FC Lokomotiv Saint Petersburg	62	(2)
2000	FC Dynamo-Stroyimpuls St. Petersburg (amateur)		
- * Club domestic league appearances and goals

Aleksandr Anatolyevich Ivanov (Russian: Александр Анатольевич Иванов; born 14 April 1973) is a former Russian football player.
