= Belye Medvedi =

Belye Medvedi Polar Bears
- City: Chelyabinsk, Russia
- League: Minor Hockey League
- Conference: Eastern
- Division: Ural-Siberia
- Founded: 2009
- Home arena: Traktor Ice Arena
- Colors
- Affiliates: Traktor Chelyabinsk (KHL); Chelmet Chelyabinsk (VHL)
- Website: https://hctraktor.org/belye-medvedi/

Franchise history
- 2009–present: Belye Medvedi

The Belye Medvedi (Russian: Белые Медведи, lit. 'Polar Bears') are a Russian ice hockey team in the Junior Hockey League (MHL). They play in Chelyabinsk, Russia at the Traktor Ice Arena. The team was founded in 2009 and is a junior affiliate of the Kontinental Hockey League's Traktor Chelyabinsk and Chelmet Chelyabinsk of the Supreme Hockey League (VHL).

== NHL alumni ==
- Evgeny Kuznetsov
- Nikita Nesterov
- Valeri Nichushkin
- Yakov Trenin
