= Anatoly Seglin =

Soviet association football player and ice hockey player (1922–2009)

Personal information
- Date of birth: August 18, 1922
- Place of birth: Moscow, Russia SSR
- Date of death: March 10, 2009 (aged 86)
- Place of death: Moscow, Russia

Senior career*
Years	Team	Apps	(Gls)
1939—1941	Lokomotiv Club (Moscow) KFC		
1941	Spartak-club (Moscow) KFC		
1942—1952	Spartak Moscow)	83	(0)
1953	Chemist (Electrostal) KFC		
- * Club domestic league appearances and goals

Anatoly Vladimirovich Seglin (Russian:Анатолий Владимирович Сеглин) August 18, 1922, Moscow–March 10, 2009, ibid.) was a Soviet football player and hockey player. After his career, he worked as a coach and hockey referee.

== Biography ==
He spent most of his football career for the Spartak Moscow club, for which he played for 11 seasons, winning three USSR Cups. In addition to Spartak, he played for the clubs KFC Lokomotiv-Club, Spartak-Club, and Khimik Elektrostal.

After finishing his career, he led the teams of KFC Khimik Elektrostal and Trud Gorenki, and in the 1960s, he worked as a coach in the Moscow football section.

At the same time, he worked as a hockey coach. 1955–1958: senior coach of HC Spartak (Moscow).

Awarded the medal of the Order of Merit for the Fatherland, II degree (1995).

He died on March 10, 2009, in Moscow after a long illness, and was buried on March 13 at the Moscow Armenian Cemetery.

== Statistics of football performances ==
Season	Championship		Double		Cup		Others	
Season	Games	Goals	Games	Goals	Games	Goals	Games	Goals
1942	0	0	0	0	0	0	0	0
1943	0	0	0	0	0	0	0	0
1944	0	0	0	0	0	0	0	0
1945	17	0	0	0	?	0	0	0
1946	1	0	20	0	?	0	0	0
1947	21	0	?	?	5	0	0	0
1948	26	0	?	?	4	0	0	0
1949	8	0	?	?	?	0	0	0
1950	5	0	27	?	2	0	0	0
1951	5	0	?	?	0	0	0	0
1952	0	0	11	0	1	0	1	0
Total	83	0	?	?	?	0	1	0

== Achievements ==
Football

- Winner of the USSR Football Cup: 1946, 1947, 1950

Hockey

- Second prize-winner of the USSR championship: 1947/1948
- Third prize-winner of the USSR championship: 1946/1947

== Links ==
- Seglin, Anatoly Vladimirovich - article in the encyclopedia "Hockey", 2006.
- Interview with Seglin
