= Valeri Fomenkov =

Soviet Russian ice hockey player

Valeri Fomenkov (December 24, 1938 – December 29, 2021) was an ice hockey player who played in the Soviet Hockey League. He played for HC Spartak Moscow. He was inducted into the Russian and Soviet Hockey Hall of Fame in 1995.

Fomenkov was a Spartak player from 1960 to 1970, winning the USSR championship three times (1962, 1967, 1969), and added a fourth championship as the team's coach (1976).

He died on December 29, 2021, at the age of 83.
