= Sergei Gimayev (ice hockey, born 1955) =

Soviet ice hockey player

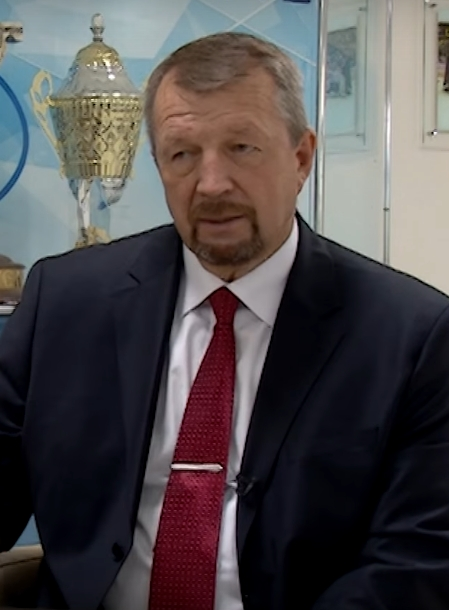
- Sergei Gimaev in 2015
- Born: 1 January 1955 Pruzhany, Byelorussian SSR, Soviet Union
- Died: 18 March 2017 (aged 62) Tula, Russia
- Height: 6 ft 4 in (193 cm)
- Weight: 207 lb (94 kg; 14 st 11 lb)
- Position: Defence
- Played for: HC CSKA Moscow; Leningrad SKA
- Playing career: 1976–1986

Sergei Nailevich Gimayev (Russian: Cepгeй Наильeвич Гимаeв; 1 January 1955 – 18 March 2017) was a Soviet professional ice hockey player who played ten seasons (1976–86) in the Soviet Championship League with HC CSKA Moscow and Leningrad SKA. After the end of his career as a player, Gimayev worked as a TV sports presenter. He was an ethnic Tatar.

== Death ==
Gimayev died on 18 March 2017 in Tula at the age of 62.
