= Aleksey Volchenkov =

Russian ice hockey player (1953–2011)

Personal information
- Born: 2 March 1953 (age 73) Novosibirsk, Russian SFSR, USSR
- Died: 10 January 2011 (aged 57). Moscow, Russia
- Years active: 1970-1983

Sport
- Position: defender
- Club: "Sibir" (Novosibirsk) (1970-1971) CSKA (Moscow) (1971-1983) SKA (Novosibirsk) (1983-1984)

Alexey Alekseevich Volchenkov (5 February 1953, Novosibirsk, RSFSR, USSR – 10 January 2011, Moscow) was a Soviet hockey player and defenseman. He was a Master of Sports of the USSR and an Honored Master of Sports of Russia (2003). He is the father of Anton Volchenkov.

== Biography ==
Volchenkov began playing ice hockey in 1966 in his hometown of Novosibirsk.

In 1970, he joined the team of masters of the Sibir hockey club, and a year later, at the invitation of Anatoly Tarasov, He continued his career at the capital's CSKA. After playing for CSKA for 13 years, he won the USSR championships 10 times and the European Cup 8 times. However, despite his permanent place at the heart of the army team, he never played at the Olympics or World Championships.

After finishing his career, he worked in the sports committee of the Ministry of Defense and later in the military registration and enlistment office.

== Career ==
- 1970-1971 - “Sibir” (Novosibirsk)
- 1971-1983 - CSKA (Moscow)
- 1983-1984 - SKA (Novosibirsk)

== Achievements ==
- Winner of the Izvestia Prize (USSR national team): 1973
- Winner of European Cup (8): 1972—1974, 1976, 1978—1981
- USSR Champion (10): 1972, 1973, 1975, 1977-1983.
- Silver medalist of the USSR Championship (2): 1974, 1976
- Winner of the USSR Cup (3): 1973, 1977, 1979.
- USSR Cup finalist: 1976
- Winner of the Spartakiad of the Friendly Armies (Leningrad, USSR) (USSR Armed Forces team): 1975
- Participant of Super Series 1975/1976.
- Awarded Order “For Service to the Motherland in the Armed Forces of the USSR”.

== Links ==
- Volchenkov Alexey Alekseevich on the website of PHC CSKA
- Sports necropolis
