= United States Alpine Ski Championships =

International alpine skiing event

- Status: active
- Genre: sporting event
- Begins: 1933
- Frequency: annual
- Location: various
- Organiser: U.S. Ski & Snowboard

The United States Alpine Ski Championships is an alpine skiing competition organized by U.S. Ski & Snowboard.

== Organization ==
These championships have started with downhill in 1933 for men, followed in 1935 by slalom and combined. Women races have started in 1938.

Every year, one or several American ski resorts organize the events, generally beginning from end of March, after the last world cup race. Each title is given after a unique race. Some races may be cancelled (principally speed races) for weather or snow quality reasons.

The five disciplines are :

- Downhill
- Super-G from 1987
- Giant slalom from 1952
- Slalom
- Combined

== Results ==
=== Men ===
Year	Place	Downhill	Super-G	Giant slalom	Slalom	Combined						
Missing data must be completed
1933	Warren, New Hampshire	HS Woods										
1934	Estes Park	JJ Duncan										
1935	Seattle	Hannes Schroll (Austria)			Hannes Schroll (Austria)	Hannes Schroll (Austria)						
1936	not organized											
1937	Sun Valley	Dick Durrance			Dick Durrance	Dick Durrance						
1938	Stowe	Ulrich Beutter (Germany)			Ed Meservey	Ulrich Beutter (Germany)						
1939	Portland	Dick Durrance / Toni Matt			Dick Durrance / Friedl Pfeifer (Austria)	Dick Durrance						
1940	Sun Valley	Dick Durrance			Dick Durrance / Friedl Pfeifer (Austria)	Dick Durrance						
1941	Aspen	William Redlin / Toni Matt			William Redlin / Dick Durrance	William Redlin / Toni Matt						
1942	Yosemite	Barney McLean / Martin Fopp			Barney McLean	Barney McLean / Alf Engen						
1943-1945	not organized											
1946	Franconia	Steve Knowlton			Dick Novitz	Barney McLean						
1947	Snowbasin	Karl Molitor (Switzerland)			Karl Molitor (Switzerland)	Karl Molitor (Switzerland)						
1948	Sun Valley	Jack Reddish			Jack Reddish	Jack Reddish						
1949	Whitefish	Yves Latreille			George Macomber	George Macomber						
1950	Sun Valley	Jim Griffith			Jack Reddish	Jack Reddish / Ernie McCulloch						
1951	Whitefish / Sun Valley	Jack Nagel / Ernie McCulloch			Jack Nagel / Ernie McCulloch							
1952	Stowe / Alta	Dick Buek / Ernie McCulloch		Gale Spence	Jack Reddish	Jack Reddish						
1953	Aspen / Stowe	Ralph Miller		William Tibbits	Ralph Miller / Stein Eriksen (Norway)	Ralph Miller						
1954	Aspen	Dick Buek			Chiharu Igaya (Japan)	Chiharu Igaya (Japan)						
1955	Franconia / North Conway / Stevens Pass	Chiharu Igaya (Japan)		Martin Strolz (Austria) / Jack Nagel / Ralph Miller	Ralph Miller	Chiharu Igaya (Japan)						
1956	Squaw Valley	William Woods		Christian Pravda	Tom Corcoran	William Woods						
1957	Aspen	Buddy Werner		Toni Sailer (Austria)	Tom Corcoran	Tom Corcoran						
1958	Snowbasin	Wiliam Smith		Stanley Harwood	Charles Ferries	Gary Vaughn / Franck Brown						
1959	Aspen	Buddy Werner		Buddy Werner	Buddy Werner	Buddy Werner						
1960	Alta	Oddvar Ronnestad (Norway)		Chiharu Igaya (Japan)	Jim Heuga	Oddvar Ronnestad (Norway)						
1961				Gordon Eaton	Rod Hebron (Canada)	Rod Hebron (Canada)						
1962	Solitude	Dave Gorsuch		Jim Gaddis	Bill Barrier	Dave Gorsuch						
1963	Alyeska	Bill Marolt		Buddy Werner	Charles Ferries	Buddy Werner						
1964	Winter Park	Ni Orsi Jr.		Billy Kidd | Bill Marolt	Gordon Eaton							
1965	Crystal Mountain	Loris Werner		Bill Marolt	Rod Hebron (Canada)	Peter Duncan (Canada)						
1966	Stowe	Peter Rohr (Switzerland)		Jean-Claude Killy (France)	Guy Périllat (France)	Guy Périllat (France)						
1967	Missoula	Denis McCoy		Dumeng Giovanoli (Switzerland)	Jim Heuga	Dumeng Giovanoli (Switzerland)						
1968		Scott Henderson (Canada)		Rick Chaffee	Rick Chaffee	Scott Henderson (Canada)						
1969		Spider Sabich		Hank Kashiwa	Bob Cochran							
1970		Rod Taylor		Tyler Palmer	Bob Cochran	Billy McKay						
1971		Bob Cochran		Otto Tschudi (Norway)	Bob Cochran	Bob Cochran						
1972		Steve Lathrop		Terry Palmer	Jim Hunter	(Canada)	Bob Cochran	1973	Bob Cochran	Masayoshi Kashiwagi (Japan)	David Currier	David Currier
1974				Cary Adgate	Bob Cochran	Cary Adgate						
1975		Andy Mill		Phil Mahre	Steve Mahre	Greg Jones						
1976		Greg Jones		Cary Adgate	Geoff Bruce	Cary Adgate						
1977						Cary Adgate						
1978 - 1984	Missing data must be completed											
1985						Tiger Shaw						
1986	Copper Mountain	Doug Lewis			Henrik Smith-Meyer	Tiger Shaw						
1987		Doug Lewis	Tiger Shaw	Felix McGrath	Bob Ormsby	Tiger Shaw						
1988						Tiger Shaw						
1989	Crested Butte	Jeff Olson	Tommy Moe	Kyle Wieche	Felix McGrath	Bill Hudson						
1990	Crested Butte			Tommy Moe		Kyle Wieche						
1991	Crested Butte	AJ Kitt	AJ Kitt	Alain Feutrier (France)	Joe Levins	Joe Levins						
1992	Winter Park		Erik Schlopy	Erik Schlopy		Toni Standteiner						
1993						Chris Puckett						
1994						Jeremy Nobis						
1995	Snowbasin / Park City	AJ Kitt	-	Daron Rahlves	Matthew Grosjean	Paul Casey Puckett						
1996	Sugarloaf	Chad Fleischer	Kyle Rasmussen	Daron Rahlves	Chip Knight	Chris Puckett						
1997	Sugarloaf	Tommy Moe	Tommy Moe	Sacha Gros	Martin Tichy (Czech Republic)	Chris Puckett						
1998	Jackson	Ed Podivinsky (Canada)	-	Bode Miller	Sacha Gros	Dane Spencer						
1999	Ogden	Chad Fleischer	Jakub Fiala	J. Andrew Martin	Sacha Gros	Dane Spencer						
2000	Jackson	Christopher Puckett	Daron Rahlves	Paul Casey Puckett	Erik Schlopy	Paul Casey Puckett						
2001	Big Mountain	Daron Rahlves	Erik Schlopy / Paul Casey Puckett	-	Erik Schlopy	Paul Casey Puckett						
2002	Squaw Valley / Sugar Bowl	-	Marco Sullivan	Thomas Vonn	Bode Miller	Bode Miller						
2003	Whiteface	Steven Nyman	Bode Miller	Erik Schlopy	Bode Miller	Bode Miller						
2004	Alyeska	Bryon Friedman	Daron Rahlves	James Cochran	James Cochran	Bryon Friedman						
2005	Mammoth Mountain	Steven Nyman	Daron Rahlves	Erik Schlopy	Ted Ligety	Ted Ligety						
2006	Sugarloaf	Bode Miller	Daron Rahlves	Bode Miller	Ted Ligety	Ted Ligety						
2007	Alyeska	Marco Sullivan	Bode Miller	Ted Ligety	Jimmy Cochran	Ted Ligety						
2008	Sugarloaf	Thomas Lanning	Kevin Francis	Tim Jitloff	Jimmy Cochran	Jimmy Cochran						
2009	Alyeska	Marco Sullivan	cancelled	Tim Jitloff	David Chodounsky	Tim Jitloff						
2010	Aspen / Lake Placid	Travis Ganong	Travis Ganong	Tommy Ford	Tommy Ford	Tommy Ford						
2011	Aspen / Winter Park	Dustin Cook	Tommy Ford	Tommy Ford	Colby Granstrom	Tommy Ford						
2012	Aspen / Winter Park	Louis-Pierre Helie (Canada)	Dustin Cook (Canada)	Robbie Kelley	Tommy Ford	Tommy Ford						
2013	Copper Mountain / Squaw Valley	Jared Goldberg	Travis Ganong	Tim Jitloff	Ted Ligety	Will Brandenburg						
2014	Copper Mountain / Squaw Valley	Bryce Bennett	-	Tim Jitloff	David Chodounsky							
2015	Sugarloaf	Wiley Marple	Drew Duffy	Tim Jitloff	David Chodounsky	David Chodounsky						
2016	Sun Valley	-	Tim Jitloff	Kieffer Christianson	David Chodounsky	Brennan Rubie						
2017	Sugarloaf	-	Ryan Cochran-Siegle	Hig Roberts	AJ Ginnis	Kipling Weisel						
2018	Sun Valley	-	Ryan Cochran-Siegle	Tommy Ford	Hig Roberts	Ryan Cochran-Siegle						
2019	Waterville Valley	-	-	Ryan Cochran-Siegle	Luke Winters	Luke Winters						
2020	Copper Mountain	Romed Baumann (Germany)	Simon Jocher (Germany)	River Radamus	Luke Winters	-						
2021	Aspen	Thomas Biesemeyer	River Radamus	Tobias Kogler (Austria)	Benjamin Ritchie	Luke Winters						
2022	Sugarloaf	Jared Goldberg	cancelled	George Steffey	Jett Seymour	-						
2023	Sun Valley	-	Kyle Negomir	Tommy Ford	Jett Seymour	-						
2024	Sun Valley	-	River Radamus	River Radamus	Luke Winters	-						
2025	Vail	-	Luke Winters	River Radamus	Benjamin Ritchie	-						
2026	Vail	-	Isaiah Nelson / River Radamus	Johs Braathen Herland (Norway)	Cooper Puckett	-						

=== Women ===
Year	Place	Downhill	Super-G	Giant slalom	Slalom	Combined
Missing data must be completed
1938	Stowe	Marian McKean			GC Lindley	Marian McKean
1939	Portland, Oregon	Elizabeth Woolsey			Doris Friedrich (Switzerland) / Erna Steuri (Switzerland)	Betty Woolsey / Erna Steuri (Switzerland)
1940	Sun Valley	GC Lindley			Nancy Reynolds	Marilyn Shaw
1941	Aspen	Nancy Reynolds / Gretchen Fraser			Marilyn Shaw	Nancy Reynolds / Gretchen Fraser
1942	Yosemite	Shirley McDonald / Clarita Heath			Gretchen Fraser	Shirley McDonald / Clarita Heath
1943-1945	not organized					
1946	Franconia	Paula Kann			Rhona Wurtele (Canada)	Rhona Wurtele
1947	Snowbasin	Rhoda Wurtele (Canada)			Olivia Ausoni (Switzerland)	Rhona Wurtele
1948	Sun Valley	Jannette Burr			Anne Winn	Suzzone Harris
1949	Whitefish	Andrea Mead-Lawrence			Andrea Mead-Lawrence	Andrea Mead-Lawrence
1950	Sun Valley	Jannette Burr			Norma Godden / Georgette Miller-Thiollière (France)	Lois Woodworth
1951	Whitefish / Sun Valley	Katy Rodolph			Katy Rodolph	Katy Rodolph
1952	Stowe / Alta	Andrea Mead-Lawrence		Rhona Gillis	Andrea Mead-Lawrence	Andrea Mead-Lawrence
1953	Aspen / Stowe	Katy Rodolph		Andrea Mead-Lawrence	Katy Rodolph	Katy Rodolph / Sally Neidlinger
1954	Aspen	Nancy Banks			Jill Kinmont	Nancy Banks
1955	Franconia / North Conway / Stevens Pass	Andrea Mead-Lawrence		Jannette Burr	Andrea Mead-Lawrence	Andrea Mead-Lawrence
1956	Squaw Valley	Katherine Cox		Sally Deaver	Sally Deaver	Katherine Cox
1957	Aspen	Linda Meyers		Noni Foley	Sally Deaver	Madi Springer Miller
1958	Snowbasin	Beverley Anderson		Beverley Anderson	Beverley Anderson	Beverley Anderson
1959	Aspen	Beverley Anderson		Beverley Anderson	Linda Meyers	Linda Meyers
1960	Alta	Nancy Greene (Canada)		Anne Heggtveit (Canada)	Anne Heggtveit (Canada) / Nancy Holland (Canada)	Elizabeth Greene (Canada)
1961				Nancy Holland (Canada)	Linda Meyers	Nancy Holland (Canada)
1962	Solitude	Sharon Pecjak		Tammy Dix	Linda Meyers	Linda Meyers
1963	Alyeska	Jean Saubert		Jean Saubert	Sandy Shellworth	Starr Walton
1964	Winter Park	Jean Saubert		Jean Saubert	Jean Saubert	Jean Saubert
1965	Crystal Mountain	Nancy Greene (Canada)		Nancy Greene (Canada)	Nancy Greene (Canada)	Nancy Greene (Canada)
1966	Stowe	Madeleine Wuilloud (Switzerland)		Florence Steurer (France)	Marielle Goitschel (France)	Florence Steurer (France)
1967	Missoula	Nancy Greene (Canada)		Sandy Shellworth	Penny McCoy	Karen Budge
1968		Ann Black		Marilyn Cochran	Judy Nagel	Judy Nagel
1969		Ann Black		Barbara Cochran	-	-
1970		Ann Black		Susie Corrock	Patty Boydstun	Rosie Fortna
1971		Cheryl Bechdolt		Laurie Kreiner	Barbara Cochran	Judy Crawford
1972		Stephanie Forrest		Sandy Poulsen	Marilyn Cochran	Stephanie Forrest
1973		Cindy Nelson		Debi Handley | Lindy Cochran	Marilyn Cochran	
1974		-		Marilyn Cochran	Susie Patterson	-
1975		Gail Blackburn		Becky Dorsey	Cindy Nelson	Becky Dorsey
1976		Susie Patterson		Lindy Cochran	Cindy Nelson	Viki Fleckenstein
1977		-		Becky Dorsey	Christin Cooper	-
1978		Cindy Nelson		Becky Dorsey	Becky Dorsey	-
1979		Irene Epple (Germany)		Vicki Fleckenstein	Cindy Nelson	-
1980		Cindy Nelson		Christin Cooper	Christin Cooper	-
1981		Holly Flanders		Tamara McKinney	Cindy Nelson	-
1982		Cindy Oak		-	Tamara McKinney	-
1983		Pam Fletcher		Tamara McKinney	Tamara McKinney	-
1984		Lisa Wilcox		Christin Cooper	Tamara McKinney	Eva Twardokens
1985		Holly Flanders		Eva Twardokens	Ann Melander	Eva Twardokens
1986	Copper Mountain	Hilary Lindh		Beth Madsen	Tamara McKinney	Beth Madsen
1987		Pam Fletcher	Pam Fletcher	Debbie Armstrong	Tamara McKinney	Pam Fletcher
1988		Pam Fletcher	Pam Fletcher	Monique Pelletier	Tamara McKinney	Monique Pelletier
1989	Crested Butte	Hilary Lindh	Kristin Krone	Kyle Wieche	Tamara McKinney / Diann Roffe Steinrotter	Kristin Krone
1990	Crested Butte	Lucie LaRoche	Krista Schmidinger	Kristi Terzian	Monique Pelletier	Julie Parisien
1991	Crested Butte	Megan Gerety	Julie Parisien	Eva Twardokens	Eva Twardokens	Wendy Fisher
1992	Winter Park	Kate Pace	Diann Roffe Steinrotter	Diann Roffe Steinrotter	Diann Roffe Steinrotter	Hilary Lindh
1993		Lindsey Roberts	Picabo Street	Diann Roffe Steinrotter	Kristi Terzian	Julie Parisien
1994		Picabo Street	Shannon Nobis	Eva Twardokens	Kristi Terzian	Melanie Turgeon
1995	Snowbasin / Park City	Megan Gerety	-	Heidi Voelker	Kristina Koznick	Carrie Sheinberg
1996	Sugarloaf	Picabo Street	Picabo Street	Jennifer Collins	Kristina Koznick	Kirsten Clark
1997	Sugarloaf	Hilary Lindh	Hilary Lindh	Carrie Sheinberg	Kristina Koznick	Carrie Sheinberg
1998	Jackson	Kirsten Clark	-	Sarah Schleper	Kristina Koznick	Julie Parisien
1999	Ogden	Kirsten Clark	Kathleen Monahan	Alexandra Shaffer	Alexandra Shaffer	Kathleen Monahan
2000	Jackson	Kirsten Clark	Kirsten Clark	-	Caroline Lalive	Caroline Lalive
2001	Big Mountain	Kirsten Clark	Jonna Mendes	Jonna Mendes	Sarah Schleper	-
2002	Squaw Valley / Sugar Bowl	-	Caroline Lalive	Jonna Mendes	Sarah Schleper	Caroline Lalive
2003	Whiteface	Julia Mancuso	Julia Mancuso	Julia Mancuso	Kristina Koznick	Lindsey Kildow
2004	Alyeska	Jonna Mendes	Lindsey Kildow	Libby Ludlow	Lindsey Kildow	Julia Mancuso
2005	Mammoth Mountain	Jonna Mendes	Bryna McCarty	Julia Mancuso	Sarah Schleper	Julia Mancuso
2006	Sugarloaf	Kirsten Clark	Stacey Cook	Caitlin Ciccone	Kaylin Richardson	Julia Mancuso
2007	Alyeska	Kaylin Richardson	Julia Mancuso	Resi Stiegler	Resi Stiegler	Kaylin Richardson
2008	Sugarloaf	Stacey Cook	Stacey Cook	Lauren Ross	Lindsey Vonn	Lindsey Vonn
2009	Alyeska	Kaylin Richardson	cancelled	Julia Mancuso	Lindsey Vonn	Julia Mancuso
2010	Aspen / Lake Placid	Leanne Smith	Keely Kelleher	Julia Mancuso	Sarah Schleper	Megan McJames
2011	Aspen / Winter Park	Julia Ford	Julia Mancuso	Julia Mancuso	Mikaela Shiffrin	Sarah Schleper
2012	Aspen / Winter Park	Julia Ford	Julia Mancuso	Julia Mancuso	Mikaela Shiffrin	Kiley Staples
2013	Copper Mountain / Squaw Valley	Jacqueline Wiles	Laurenne Ross	Julia Mancuso	Anna Goodman	Katie Hartman
2014	Copper Mountain / Squaw Valley	Jacqueline Wiles	-	Mikaela Shiffrin	Marie-Michèle Gagnon (Canada)	-
2015	Sugarloaf	Julia Ford	Alice McKennis	Nina O'Brien	Mikaela Shiffrin	Megan McJames
2016	Sun Valley	-	Anna Marno	Mikaela Shiffrin	Mikaela Shiffrin	Galena Wardle
2017	Sugarloaf	-	Laurenne Ross	Megan McJames	Resi Stiegler	Tricia Mangan
2018	Sun Valley	-	Nina O'Brien	A J Hurt	Nina O'Brien	A J Hurt
2019	Waterville Valley	-	-	Keely Cashman	Nina O'Brien	Nina O'Brien
2020	Copper Mountain	Breezy Johnson	Alice McKennis	Katie Hensien	A J Hurt	-
2021	Aspen	Laurenne Ross	Nina O'Brien	Lila Lapanja	Resi Stiegler	Lila Lapanja
2022	Sugarloaf	Isabella Wright	cancelled	Britt Richardson (Canada)	Paula Moltzan	-
2023	Sun Valley	-	Tricia Mangan	Paula Moltzan	Lila Lapanja	-
2024	Sun Valley	-	Elisabeth Bocock	Paula Moltzan	Madison Hoffman (Australia)	-
2025	Vail	-	Tricia Mangan	Elisabeth Bocock	A J Hurt	-
2026	Vail	-	Keely Cashman	Elisabeth Bocock	A J Hurt	-

== References and notes ==
- 1933 to 1967 : "United States Ski Association history / United States ski Association champions (pages 74-79)" (PDF). www.skiinghistory.org. Archived from the original (PDF) on November 4, 2022.
- 1933 to 1976 : Claus Deutelmoser; Sepp Huber; Jutta Suttner; Walter Schwarz; Wolfgang Winheim (1976). Copress (ed.). Ski Alpin (in German). Munich. ISBN 3767901056.
- 1938 to 1996 – women : Janet Woolum (1998). "Alpine skiing U.S. National Champions". In Oryx Press (ed.). Outstanding Women Athletes. Who They Are and How They Influenced Sports in America (second ed.). Phoenix. pp. 347–349. ISBN 1-57356-120-7.
- 1938 to 2020 - combined : U.S. Ski & Snowboard Sport Committee Chairs, U.S. Ski & Snowboard Awards Working Group (2021). "White Stag/Dan Bean Award". 2021 U.S. Ski & Snowboard Awards (PDF). p. 42.
- 1987 : National Collegiate Ski Association, ed. (October 1987). "Who Won What in 1987". SKI Magazine. New York: 226.
- 1989 : National Collegiate Ski Association, ed. (October 1989). "Who Won What in 1988-89". SKI Magazine. New York: 36.
- 1991 : National Collegiate Ski Association, ed. (September 1991). "Scoreboard: Who Won What in '90-91'". SKI Magazine. New York: 22E.
- 1995 to now:"Competition results". fis-ski.com.
