= List of Casque and Gauntlet members =

Casque and Gauntlet is a senior society at Dartmouth College in Hanover, New Hampshire. Following is a list of Casque and Guantlet members by profession.

== Academia ==
- Edmund Ezra Day (1905) – president of Cornell University
- Ernest Martin Hopkins (1901) – president of Dartmouth College
- John G. Kemeny (1973, honorary) – mathematician, computer scientist who co-developed BASIC, and president of Dartmouth College
- Craven Laycock (1896) – dean of Dartmouth College
- David T. McLaughlin (1954) – president of Dartmouth College
- Lloyd K. Neidlinger (1923) – All-American football player and dean of Dartmouth College
- Joseph C. Palamountain Jr. (1942) – president of Skidmore College
- Fred Lewis Pattee (1888) – the "first Professor of American Literature"

== Art and architecture ==
- Steve Kelley (1981) – syndicated political cartoonist
- Paul Sample (1920) – artist
- Fred Wesley Wentworth (1887) – architect

== Business ==
- John Barros (1996) – businessman and politician
- Louis V. Gerstner Jr. (1963) – chairman of the board and CEO of IBM, CEO of RJR Nabisco, and president of American Express
- Harvey P. Hood (1918) – chairman of HP Hood
- George Munroe (1943) – professional basketball player and CEO of Phelps Dodge Corporation
- Robert Oelman (1931) – president of NCR Corporation
- Alan Reich (1952) – founder of the National Organization on Disability and executive with Polaroid

== Entertainment ==
- David Birney (1961) – actor and director
- Stephen Geller (1962) – screenwriter and author
- Mindy Kaling (2001) – actress, writer, and comedian
- Phil Lord (1997) – filmmaker and voice actor
- Zola Mashariki (1994) – film producer and executive
- Michael Moriarty (1963) – actor
- Charles Starrett (1926) – actor
- Jerry Zaks (1967) – stage director, and Tony Award winner

== Law ==
- Michael W. Coefield (1962) – attorney and trial lawyer
- Charles T. Duncan (1945) – attorney, law professor, and NAACP council
- William Johnson (1953) – justice, New Hampshire Supreme Court
- Alfred Adams Wheat (1889) – Chief Justice of the District Court of the United States for the District of Columbia

== Literature and journalism ==
- Carlos Baker (1889) – writer, biographer, and academic
- Tom Braden (1940) – author, journalist, and CIA operative
- LLewellyn Link Callaway Jr. (1930) – publisher of Newsweek
- Rukmini Callimachi (1995) – journalist, West African bureau chief for the Associated Press
- Dick Durrance II (1965) – National Geographic photographer
- Theodor Seuss Geisel (1925) – author and illustrator known as Dr. Seuss
- Ned Gillette (1967) – adventurer, skier, author, and journalist
- Edwin Osgood Grover (1894) – publisher and editor
- DeWitt Jones III (1965) – photojournalist for National Geographic and columnist for Outdoor Photographer
- Heinz Kluetmeier (1965) – photographer for Sports Illustrated
- Philip Sanford Marden (1894) – author and newspaper editor
- Stephen Christopher Meigher III (1968) – publisher with Time, Inc.
- James Nachtwey (1970) – photojournalist
- Richard Parker (1968) – economist and co-founder of Mother Jones
- Michael Winn (1973) – author and academic

== Politics ==
- James P. Breeden (1956) – minister, civil rights activist, and associate professor at the Harvard School of Education
- David J. Bradley (1938) – writer, New Hampshire House of Representatives, and member of the 1940 Winter Olympics ski team.
- Channing H. Cox (1901) – Governor of Massachusetts
- David Dawley (1963) – author and Civil Rights activist
- William E. Frenzel (1950) – U.S. House of Representatives
- Daniel Garodnick (1994) – New York City politician
- Fred A. Howland (1887) – Secretary of State of Vermont
- Jonathan Moore (1954) – Ambassador and Director of the Bureau of Refugee Programs
- Henry Paulson (1968) – U.S. Secretary of the Treasury
- Robert Reich (1968) – U.S. Secretary of Labor
- Nelson Rockefeller (1930) – Vice President of the United States and Governor of New York
- Herman T. Schneebeli (1930) – U.S. House of Representatives
- Charles Manley Smith (1891) – Governor of Vermont

== Sports ==
- David J. Bradley (1938) – writer, New Hampshire House of Representatives, and member of the 1940 Winter Olympics ski team.
- John Carleton – Olympic skier and a pioneer of alpine skiing in the United States
- Joseph H. Edwards (1899) – football player and coach
- Dick Durrance (1933) – professional skier
- Charles S. Feeney (1943) – president of the National League
- Chiharu Igaya (1957) – Olympic medalist for alpine skiing
- George Munroe (1943) – professional basketball player and CEO of Phelps Dodge Corporation
- Lloyd K Neidlinger (1923) – All-American football player and dean of Dartmouth College
- Jim Page (1963) – Olympic skier and coach
- J. Burton Rix (1906) – college football and basketball coach
- David Shula (1981) – professional football coach
- Albert Lincoln Washburn (1935) – Arctic explorer, geologist, and Olympic skier
