= Dane Spencer =

American alpine skier

Personal information
- Born: December 24, 1977 (age 48) Boise, Idaho, U.S.
- Height: 5 ft 9 in (1.75 m)

Skiing career
- Sport: Alpine skiing
- Club: Bogus Basin Ski; Education Foundation
- Retired: April 2010 (age 32)
- Disciplines: Giant slalom, super-G
- World Cup debut: November 25, 1996 (age 18)

Olympics
- Teams: 1 – (2002)
- Medals: 0

World Championships
- Teams: 4 – (1997, '99, 2003, '05)
- Medals: 0

World Cup
- Seasons: 8 – (2000-06, '08)
- Podiums: 0
- Overall titles: 0
- Discipline titles: 0 – (20th in GS, 2005)

Dane Spencer (born December 24, 1977) is a former World Cup alpine ski racer and current assistant coach with the U.S. Ski Team. At the World Cup level, he specialized in the giant slalom.

== Career ==
Born in Boise, Idaho, Spencer grew up skiing and racing at Bogus Basin. He made the U.S. Ski Team at age 16, and debuted in World Cup competition at age 18 in a giant slalom in Park City. He attended the University of Colorado in Boulder and was a member of the 2002 U.S. Olympic team and finished 16th in the giant slalom, held in Park City. His best finish in international competition was 7th in the GS at the 2005 World Championships in Bormio, Italy.

=== Injury in 2006 ===
Battling injuries during the 2006 season, he narrowly missed the Olympic team in 2006, and was back in North America in February to tune up for the remainder of the World Cup season in Europe with several events on the Nor-Am Cup circuit. After a pair of super-G races at Apex in British Columbia, he raced in two downhill events at The Big Mountain (now Whitefish Mountain Resort) near Whitefish, Montana. During the second race on February 14, 2006, Spencer crashed after the "Launch Pad" jump and incurred serious injuries. He fractured his neck and pelvis, had massive internal bleeding, and spent nearly a week in an induced coma; he recovered but spent most of 2006 recuperating. The same Ursa Major race course had ended the comeback attempt of Bill Johnson five years earlier, after a violent crash at the "Corkscrew" section left the 1984 Olympic champion significantly impaired by a head injury in 2001. Despite the severe injuries and near paralysis, Spencer progressed well during the summer of 2006 and was placed on the "A" team for the 2007 World Cup season, but did not race again until the following season.

=== After racing ===
Following the injury, Spencer did not regain his previous form and struggled for results. He started only a handful of World Cup events and retired from racing following the 2010 season at age 32. Spencer became a coach with the U.S. Ski Team that summer and assisted with the Europa Cup and World Cup teams during the 2011 season. He was named an assistant coach for the U.S. men's World Cup team for the 2012 season, under men's head coach Forest Carey.

== Top finishes ==
- World Championships – 7th place – giant slalom – 2005
- World Cup – 10th place – giant slalom – 05-Jan-2002
- Olympics – 16th place – giant slalom – 2002
- U.S. National Championships – 2nd place – giant slalom – 1998, 2005

== World Cup top twenty finishes ==
Season	Date	Location	Discipline	Place
2002	5 Jan 2002	Adelboden, Switzerland	Giant slalom	10th
2004	22 Nov 2003	Park City, USA	Giant slalom	13th
2004	21 Dec 2003	Alta Badia, Italy	Giant slalom	11th
2004	3 Jan 2004	Flachau, Austria	Giant slalom	18th
2004	7 Feb 2004	Adelboden, Switzerland	Giant slalom	13th
2005	4 Dec 2004	Beaver Creek, USA	Giant slalom	11th
2005	21 Dec 2004	Flachau, Austria	Giant slalom	12th
2005	11 Jan 2005	Adelboden, Switzerland	Giant slalom	17th
2006	3 Dec 2005	Beaver Creek, USA	Giant slalom	12th

=== 2007 U.S. Ski Team – Men's "A" Team ===
- Ted Ligety – (22; Park City, Utah)
- Bode Miller – (28; Bretton Woods, New Hampshire)
- Bryon Friedman – (26; Park City, Utah)
- Scott Macartney – (28; Redmond, Washington)
- Steve Nyman – (24; Orem, Utah)
- Erik Schlopy – (34; Park City, Utah)
- Dane Spencer – (28; Boise, Idaho)
