= African-American Film Critics Association Awards 2013 =

Annual US film awards ceremony

11th African-American Film Critics Association Awards

Highlights
- Best Picture: 12 Years a Slave

Below are the winners for the 2013 African-American film Critics Associations.

== Winners ==
- Best Picture:
  - 1. 12 Years a Slave (Winner)
  - 2. Lee Daniels' The Butler
  - 3. Mandela: Long Walk to Freedom (film)
  - 4. American Hustle
  - 5. Gravity
  - 6. Fruitvale Station
  - 7. Dallas Buyers Club
  - 8. Saving Mr. Banks
  - 9. Out of the Furnace
  - 10. 42

Category	Recipient	Film
Best Actor	Forest Whitaker	Lee Daniels' the Butler
Best Actress	Sandra Bullock	Gravity
Best Director	Steve McQueen	12 Years a Slave
Best Screenplay	John Ridley	12 Years a Slave
Best Supporting Actor	Jared Leto	Dallas Buyer's Club
Best Supporting Actress	Oprah Winfrey	Lee Daniels' the Butler
Breakthrough Performance	Lupita Nyong'o	12 Years a Slave
Best Independent Film		Fruitvale Station
Best Animated Feature		Frozen
Best World Cinema		Mother of George
Best Music	Raphael Saadiq	Black Nativity

Special Achievement: Cheryl Boone Isaacs, Paris Barclay, Bob Weinstein, Harvey Weinstein, Zola Mashariki
