= Toni Matt =

Austrian-American skier

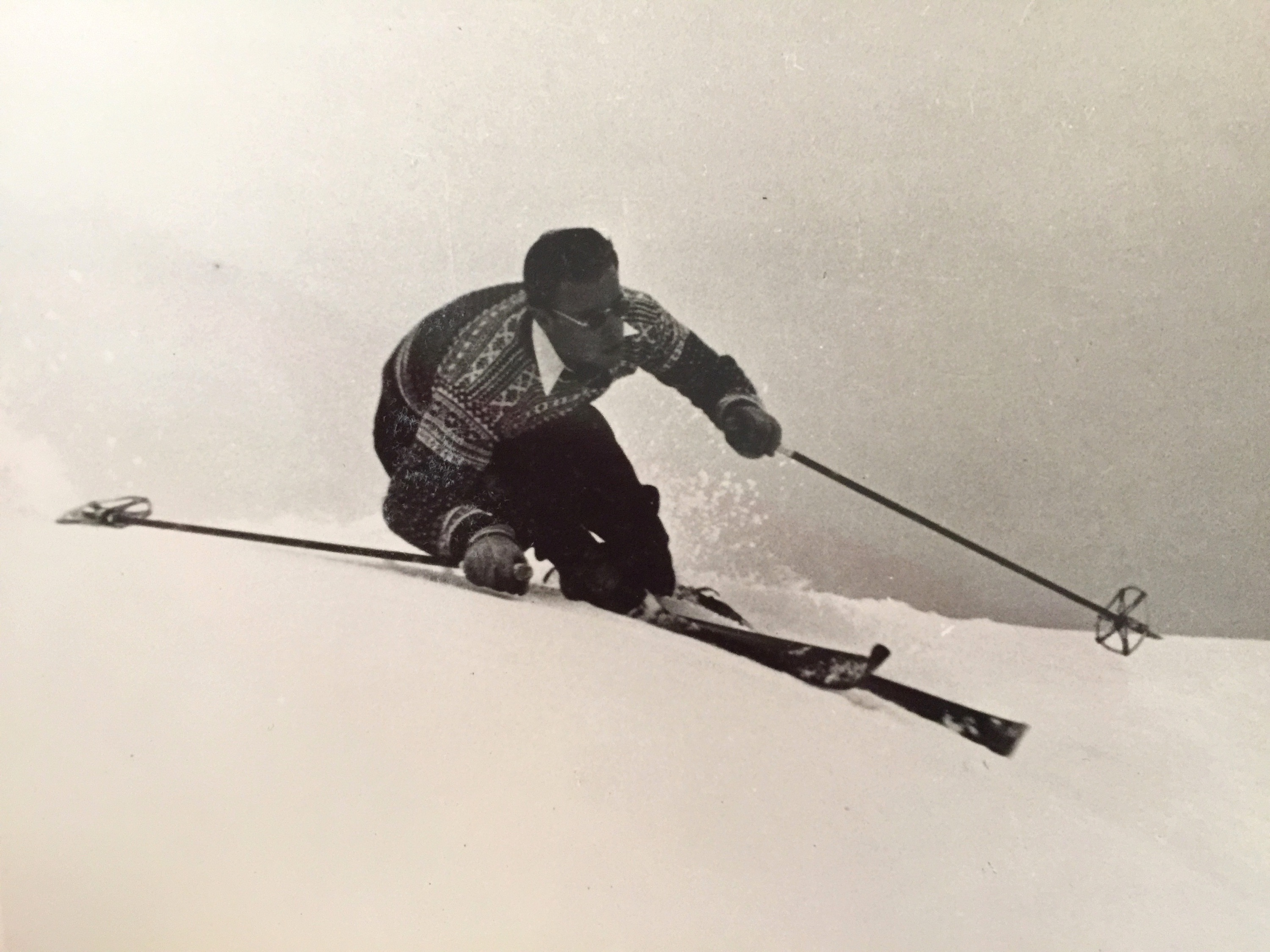
Toni Matt in 1939

Anton "Toni" Matt (November 21, 1919 – May 17, 1989) was an Austrian-American ski pioneer, champion racer, Guinness Book World Record Holder, and veteran of the U.S. Army's 10th Mountain Division.

== Biography ==
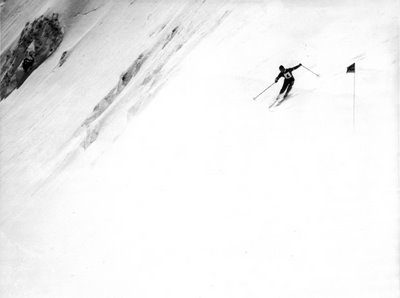
1939 Inferno Race Photograph

Matt was born in St. Anton, Austria, in 1919. He came to North Conway, New Hampshire, in 1938 after becoming Junior National Champion in the Austrian Alps. He was a protégé of Hannes Schneider, who became known as "The Father of Alpine Ski Technique". Skiers trained by Schneider quickly spread across the United States, developing the growing ski industry in the years following World War II.

Matt's most renowned feat came on April 16, 1939, when in the Third "American Inferno", a top-to-bottom race of Tuckerman Ravine on Mount Washington, New Hampshire, he "schussed" (skied straight downhill without turning) the steep and infamous Headwall. His time for the 4-mile (6.4 km) race was 6 minutes 29.2 seconds, with an estimated top speed of over 90 miles per hour (140 km/h), cutting the existing course record in half. Matt was the U.S. Downhill Champion in 1939 and 1941, winning 30 downhill races nationally. As of April 16, 2024 The Guinness Book of World Records has listed Austrian born Anton (Toni) Matt then age 19, as the official World Record Holder for the fastest Mount Washington, New Hampshire Inferno 4 mile ski race at 6 min 29.2 seconds, 85 years after he set the world record on April 16, 1939

During World War II, he served as a lieutenant in the U.S. Army's 87th Regiment, 10th Mountain Division, where he was part of the August 1943 Aleutian Islands Kiska Invasion Force of 34,000+ Canadian and American troops. This unit was the only major U.S. force specifically trained for mountain warfare. By his service, Matt became a U.S. citizen.

Matt coached the U.S. Men's ski team in 1949–1950. He retired from ski racing in 1951 following a fractured leg. He recovered and went on to direct ski schools at Big Mountain (which he also founded) in Whitefish, Montana; Catamount Ski Area in Egremont, Massachusetts; and Whiteface Mountain in Lake Placid, New York, where he was a race official for the 1980 Winter Olympic alpine events. On December 14, 2024, the trail Race Slope at Catamount Ski Area was renamed to Toni Matt.

Herbert Schneider, the son of Hannes Schneider and Matt's lifelong friend and fellow Austrian, said that Matt was "an especially gifted ski instructor." Lowell Thomas, famous broadcaster, family friend, and ski enthusiast, called Matt "The Babe Ruth of Skiing".

Matt was inducted into the National Ski Hall of Fame in 1967. He died on May 17, 1989, in Pawling, New York, where he lived with his wife Stella and raised their family of five children.

A family-loaned collection of Toni Matt's memorabilia – including the 1939 Inferno Cup and other trophies, photos, video, and audio – can be experienced at the New England Ski Museum in Franconia, New Hampshire, located at the base of the Cannon Mountain Tramway, and The Eastern Slope Branch at North Conway New Hampshire on the Town Green near the 1880's Victorian Train Station

== Schussing the Headwall ==
Three times during the 1930s, a ski race was run from the summit cone of Mount Washington, the highest mountain in the northeastern United States, to the base lodge at Pinkham Notch. The course of the race – dubbed "the American Inferno" – ran over the headwall of Tuckerman Ravine, which in some areas drops at more than 50 degrees. Since the 1930s, attempts to recreate the original American Inferno have been cancelled several times due to extreme weather conditions. Although races along parts of the route have been held from time to time, it is unlikely that the "true" American Inferno of the 1930s will ever be held again due to its highly unsafe design, as well as weather problems – both extreme winter weather at the summit and spring melting and flooding at the base.

Two weeks after winning the national downhill championship in the spring of 1939, Toni Matt entered the third (and last) running of the American Inferno. He did not plan to schuss the entire Headwall; instead he intended to make a few turns before tucking and heading straight down. However, he did not realize that he had not yet reached the lip, the steepest part of the approach to the Headwall. By the time he realized his error, it was too late to turn. Years later, he said that when he reached the floor of the Headwall, at the transition from steep to relatively flat, he felt lucky to be "nineteen, stupid, and have strong legs". Matt's top speed, estimated by study of movie film, was 90 mph. His winning time for the 3.8-mile race was 6 minutes 29.2 seconds. The second-place finisher, Olympian Dick Durrance, took a full minute longer. The next day the Boston Herald described the impression Matt's run made:

Maintaining almost unbelievable speed and control down the snow fields of the summit cone, the almost vertical 1000-foot headwall of Tuckerman ravine and the twisting pitches of the Sherburne trail, Matt literally raced the entire field of 44 starters into the snow.

Although a few other skiers are known to have schussed the Headwall in the past hundred years, none have done it like Toni Matt, who was already moving at a high speed (estimated by Matt to be 40–45 mph) when he dropped over the lip at the top of the Headwall.

From the first reports of Matt's run to the present day, writers have frequently noted the astonishing fact that Matt's time of 6:29.2 did not just break the record of 12:35.0 set at the second Inferno in 1934, but nearly cut it in half. While these facts are correct, the record-breaking time owes little to Matt's renowned Headwall schuss. In fact, even though only Matt schussed the Headwall, 37 of the 44 skiers in the 1939 race beat the 1934 course record. Second-place finisher Dick Durrance wrote in his memoir that he doubted the schuss could even account for one minute of time saved.

There are at least four reasons for such improved times in the 1939 running of the Inferno: the snow conditions at the time were ideal; there was a strong tail wind; the skiers were given wide latitude to choose their own routes (there was only a single gate), so strategy was an important determinant of time; and racers in the 1939 Inferno had the benefit of the experience of racers in the two previous Infernos. And finally, the John Sherburne Ski Trail was constructed after the second Inferno, providing a faster route from the bottom of the Little Headwall to Pinkham Notch.
