= Hig Roberts =

American alpine skier (born 1991)

- Born: March 15, 1991 (age 35); Steamboat Springs, Colorado, U.S.
- Education: University of Pennsylvania (MBA) Middlebury College (BA)
- Alma mater: University of Pennsylvania
- Occupations: NHLPA, Former World Cup Skier
- Partner: Luke Macfarlane (2020-present)
- Children: 1

Hig Roberts (born March 15, 1991) is an American alpine skier. He had 31 starts in the World Cup between 2015 and 2019 and won two giant slalom national titles competing on the United States Ski Team.

== Early life and education ==
Roberts was born March 15, 1991, and raised in Steamboat Springs, Colorado where he started skiing at 2 years old. He competed in a large tournament for the first time at the age of 9 and broke his femur, resulting in a risky surgery. He began questioning his sexuality when he was 12 but did not come out. Roberts placed 7th in the giant slalom at the 2013 Winter Universiade. Roberts graduated from Middlebury College in 2014. In 2025, Roberts graduated from The Wharton School of The University of Pennsylvania with an MBA.

== Career ==
Roberts was one of a few former college skiers to join the United States Ski Team B. In 2017, Roberts beat Tim Jitloff in the giant slalom at Sugarloaf, Maine to earn his first national title. He won again in 2018. He was the first alternate U.S. team at the 2018 Winter Olympics. After retiring from sports in 2019, Roberts worked in finance in Norway and continues to ski recreationally.

== Personal life ==
In August 2016, Roberts' younger brother, Murphy, suffered a diabetic seizure while hiking and died from a head injury at the age of 22. He had type 1 diabetes and was a major influence on Roberts.

In December 2020, Roberts came out as gay.

On June 4, 2023, he had a daughter, via surrogate, with actor Luke Macfarlane.
