= Kaylin Richardson =

American alpine skier

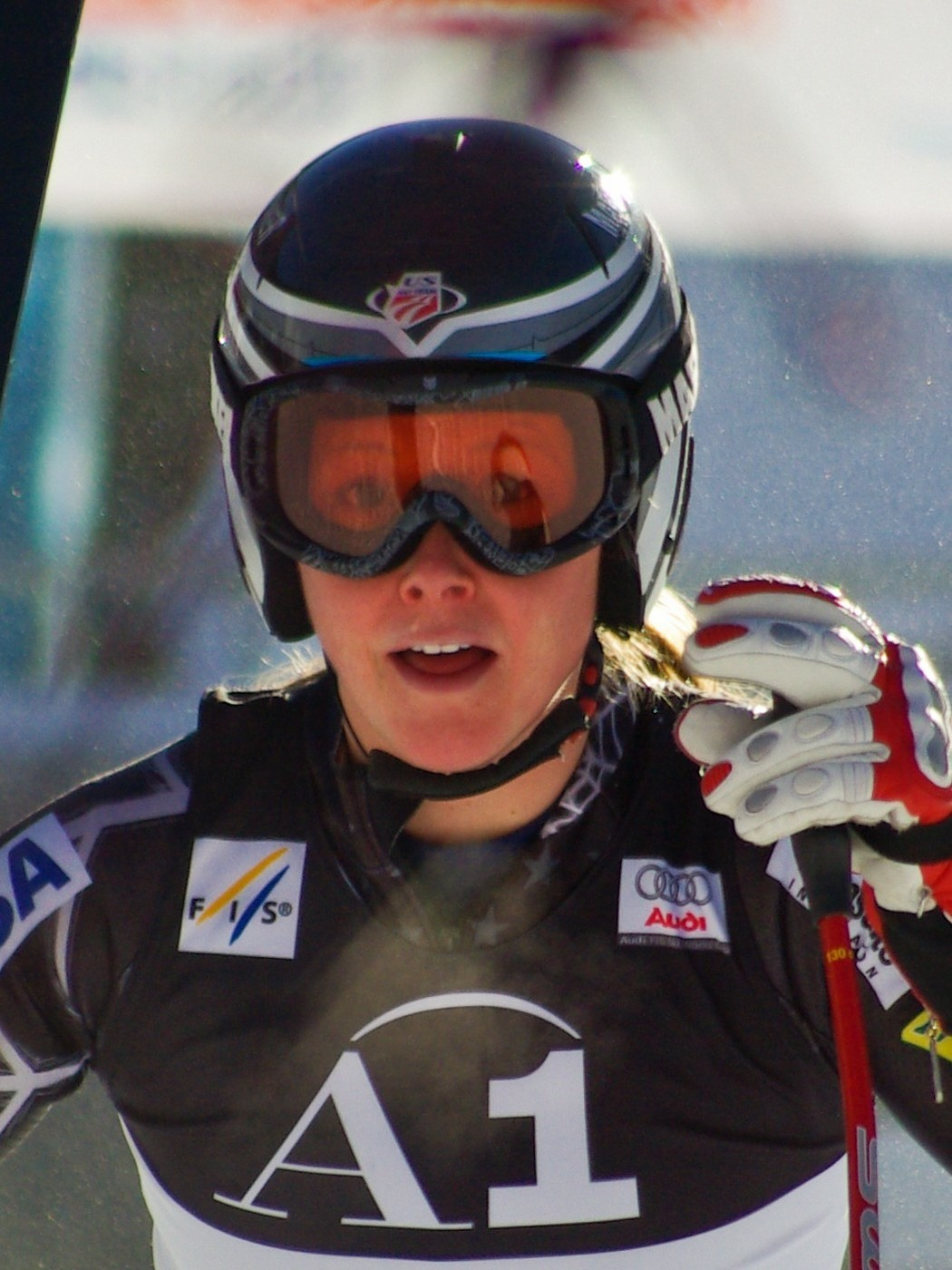

Personal information
- Born: September 28, 1984 (age 41) Minneapolis, Minnesota, United States
- Height: 1.75 m (5 ft 9 in)

Skiing career
- Sport: Alpine skiing
- Retired: March 26, 2010
- Disciplines: Downhill, super-G, giant slalom, slalom, combined
- World Cup debut: November 29, 2003

Olympics
- Teams: 2
- Medals: 0 (0 gold)

World Championships
- Teams: 1
- Medals: 0 (0 gold)

World Cup
- Seasons: 7
- Wins: 0
- Podiums: 0
- Overall titles: 0
- Discipline titles: 0

Kaylin Richardson (born September 28, 1984) is a former American alpine ski racer. She competed in the 2006 Winter Olympics in Turin and the 2010 Winter Olympics in Vancouver, finishing 17th in the alpine skiing combined both times. She retired from the United States Ski Team and professional skiing on March 26, 2010.

== Biography ==
Kaylin Richardson followed her older brothers into ski racing while growing up in the Minneapolis area. Kaylin got started skiing in the Twin Cities with the Skijammers Ski and Snowboard School, a travelling ski program where her father was an instructor. She began racing at 9 with Team Gilboa at Hyland Hills.

Richardson was named to the United States Ski Team for the 2003 season and quickly progressed through the ranks after winning back-to-back-to-back NorAm slalom titles in 2003; '04 and co-champion in '05. Richardson competed in her first World Cup race on Dec. 15, 2002 in Sestriere, Italy. She earned her first World Cup points in 2005 at the San Sicario Combined where she placed 16th. Richardson then expanded from a 'tech' skier to a four-event racer, earning FIS World Cup points in all five events in the 2005 and 2006 World Cup Seasons. Despite ankle trouble at the beginning of the 2006 season, Richardson was able to pull off top 15 and 20 results in slalom and giant slalom. Her quick rise through the World Cup through the '05-'06 seasons earned her a nomination to the 2006 Olympic Alpine Team for women's slalom and combined; she ended up being named to the Olympic combined team but left off the slalom roster for her fellow rising star Resi Stiegler.

== Career highlights ==
- "A" team member of the US Alpine Ski Team for 2007–08 season (6/18/07) and 2008–09 season
- 2009 US national downhill champion
- 2007 US national downhill champion
- 2007 US national combined champion
- 2006 US national slalom champion
- Nor-Am slalom champion 2003
- Europa Cup giant slalom champion 2004
- Nor-Am slalom champion 2004
- Swiss junior national slalom champion 2004
- Nor-Am slalom co-champion 2005
- US national DH bronze medalist 2006
- World championship team member 2007
- World championships team event slalom – 2nd place 2007
- World Championships super-combi 12th place
- Olympics: 2006 & 2010, 17th place in combined both times
