= Karen Budge =

American alpine skier (born 1949)

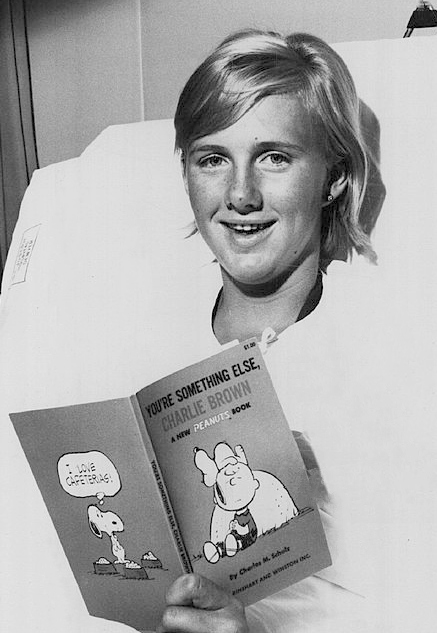
- Budge hospitalized with a dislocated shoulder at the 1968 Winter Olympics, reading a Charlie Brown book by Charles M. Schulz

Personal information
- Full name: Karen Annette Budge
- Born: November 14, 1949 (age 76) Jackson, Wyoming, U.S.
- Height: 5 ft 8 in (173 cm)
- Spouse: Gordi Eaton

Sport
- Country: United States
- Sport: Alpine skiing
- Club: Jackson Hole Ski Club
- Retired: 1972

Karen Annette Budge (born November 14, 1949) is a former World Cup alpine ski racer from the United States. She had three podium finishes and 30 top ten results in World Cup competitions between 1967 and 1972; overall her best result was 15th place in the 1969–70 season. At the 1972 Winter Olympics she placed 14th in the downhill and 23rd in the giant slalom events.

Born and raised in Jackson, Wyoming, Budge married Gordi Eaton, a former alpine ski racer and coach. They reside in Middlebury, Vermont and co-own a restaurant in Lincoln, New Hampshire, in the White Mountains near Loon Mountain and Cannon Mountain ski areas.

At the 1968 Winter Olympics in France, eighteen-year-old Budge was testing her wax on a practice course an hour before the women's downhill at Chamrousse, and narrowly avoided a full collision with a member of the Moroccan men's team, Said Housni, who had been warned once before to stay off the hill. She fell, suffered a dislocated shoulder, and did not start.
