= Bryon Friedman =

American alpine skier

Personal information
- Born: June 14, 1980 (age 46) Atlanta, Georgia, US

Skiing career
- Sport: Alpine skiing
- Club: Park City SEF
- Retired: 2009
- Disciplines: Speed events
- World Cup debut: 2001

World Cup
- Seasons: 9

Bryon Friedman (born June 14, 1980) is an American former alpine skier.

== Career ==
During his career he has achieved 3 results among the top 10 in the World Cup.

== World Cup results ==
Top 10

Date	Place	Discipline	Rank
December 18, 2004	(Italy) Val Gardena	Downhill	7
December 3, 2004	(United States) Beaver Creek	Downhill	6
January 10, 2004	(France) Chamonix	Downhill	10

== National titles ==
Friedman has won two national championships at individual senior level.

- United States Alpine Ski Championships
  - Downhill: 2004
  - Combined: 2004
