= No Place to Hide (Bradley book) =

1948 book by David J. Bradley

- First edition
- Author: David J. Bradley
- Language: English
- Publication date: 1948

No Place to Hide is a 1948 book by American writer David J. Bradley published by Little, Brown and Company. The book is a Harvard Medical School graduate's autobiographical tale of his work in the Radiological Safety Section in the Pacific in the aftermath of the Bikini atomic bomb tests, Operation Crossroads.

== Background ==
In the summer of 1946, 42,000 military personnel and military scientists assembled on the Bikini Atoll, a coral reef in the Marshall Islands of the Pacific – some 2,500 miles southwest of Hawaii – for Operation Crossroads, a joint effort led by the United States Navy (USN); the United States Marine Corps (USMC); the United States Army (USA); the United States Air Force (USAF); and the United States Coast Guard (USCG) to carry out the first publicized testing of the U.S. Military’s atomic arsenal. [1] The impetus for the tests originated from an inquiry made by future chairman of the Atomic Energy Council, Lewis Strauss who penned to Secretary of the Navy James Forrestal in a memorandum dated 16 August 1945 the need to test the navy fleet’s protection against atomic blasts out of fear of losing to obsolescence. [1]

Two tests were conducted–Abel and Baker–in 1946. Both tests consisted of the detonation of two plutonium-infused, Fat Man-style atomic bombs each with a yield of 23 kilotons of TNT (96 TJ). A test sample of 95 ships were stationed in the Bikini Lagoon. Over 175 reporters were stationed to bear witness to the testing, broadcasting for millions around the world alongside many invited guests that included senators, congressmen, a member of Truman’s cabinet, and invitees from the United Nations. [1]

A third test – Charlie – was scheduled for January 1947, but it was scrapped after radiation from the first two tests corrupted the sample ships left as controls in the experiment. Since the army only had seven atomic weapons in its arsenal at the time, and because manpower diverted to the cleanup of the ships in the first two experiments caused unexpected delays, it would be nine years before the military understood the effects of nuclear depth charges detonated deep beneath the ocean in Operation Wigwam. [1]

== Overview ==
In the prologue to the book, Bradley foreshadows the grim truths to which readers are about to bear witness. The U.S.S. Independence, a survivor of the Able and Baker tests, is being towed into San Francisco from Kwajalein, its once mighty hull now reduced to contorted mutilation that looked “less like a ship than a paper bag blown up and burst” having had endured the concussive pulverization of compressed water that traveled one mile per second. [2] Though the ship remained afloat, it had to be towed due to the “invisible poison” of radiation that covered every square inch of the ship. Strictly off limits to anyone, the ship was quarantined off the coast of San Francisco and kept in strict isolation, “a leper.” [2]

Dr. David J. Bradley’s narrative account in 1948’s No Place to Hide, is styled as a travel log–a journal of his observations and responsibilities from May until October 1946 on the Bikini Atoll, each day of significance introduced with a dateline embedded within five distinct sections: Departure; Dress Rehearsal; Able Day; Baker Day; The Count of Ten. A sixth section, Epilogue, serves as his final impressions written in 1983 before a thoroughly worded Appendix concludes the text with elaborations of key terminology that was discussed throughout the text. No Place to Hide gives great focus to the radiation dangers of atomic weaponry. Bradley was part of the team tasked with surveying the aftermath of the test bombs’ destruction with Geiger counters to catalog the “real threat of atomic weapons, namely the lingering poison of radioactivity” (62). Bradley’s team sampled water for radioactivity from the lagoon and the Pacific Ocean and tested marine life for radioactive decay. His journal entries find superficial comfort that fish out of the pacific had no traces of radioactivity compared to those in Bikini Lagoon.

Indeed, scrubbing the ships with “lye, foamite, salt water, soap” had no effect at removing the radioactivity that clung to hulls, so sandblasting was optioned, but the work was tedious and carried a great risk of spreading radioactive dust into the air (131). [2] This early in the atomic age, radiation, contamination, and cleanup were all unknown territory. Bradley gives mention to the overall feeling of disappointment that the bombs did not do more destruction than original estimates had predicted, as many of the ships were still afloat after the 520-foot airburst of the Able bomb, Gilda, (named after Rita Hayworth’s character in the 1946 film of the same name). The bomb had missed its mark by nearly half a mile when it was dropped from the B-29 Superfortress Dave’s Dream. The crew did not have any explanation for the mishap. A U.S. government investigation was launched into the crew and several theories–ranging from faulty ballistic characteristics of the bomb to crew miscalculation–were posed, but the investigation closed without ever finding a reason for the error. [1]

In an introspective epilogue tacked to the original 1948 publication, Baker speaks to the unimaginable consequences of nuclear war on all living souls, and to his astonishment at the horror of nuclear weapons continuing to be a part of global politics since the end of WWII. Baker writes of the absurdity of a one 15-megaton H-bomb when paraphrasing physicist Philip Morrison, who put the bomb’s size in the perspective of a freight train of freight cars each packed with TNT explosives. To equal the force of the 15-megaton bomb, a freight train would need to pack so many boxcars with TNT that 3,000 miles of boxcars stretching from New York to San Francisco would be needed to equal just one 15-megaton H-bomb. At the time of Bradley’s writing of this, each nation had upwards of 50,000 nuclear weapons of varying sizes apiece, when nuclear tonnage outnumbered people one to four (184). [2]

Bradley’s tone changes in the epilogue from the journal entries that appeared hopeful and somewhat naïve about the risks of radioactive poisoning. He notes how the people of Bikini were “lied to, misled, abandoned, and bamboozled” in the 1960s when told they could return to the atoll without a threat of radiation. The atoll is uninhabited to this day due to environmental radioactive contamination. He speaks to the “innocents” of Hiroshima and Nagasaki, and the young men of the army and marines who were made to lie out 2,000 yards from nuclear test blasts to prep them for WWIII conditions. “Sometimes, I wish our government could sit down with a dying veteran,” Bradley laments, “It might better understand the true costs of its war games” (183). [2]

== Reception ==
The book was marketed for Bantam by Judith Merril, who found Bradley's prose "a man's book with little appeal for women," leading her to later write her own nuclear war story Shadow on the Hearth from the homemaker's perspective.[5] Scholar David K. Hecht lauds the book, stating that “No Place to Hide is not exclusively concerned with radioactivity; it also gives a detailed account of the preparations and events of the Bikini tests. However, its message focused on this lingering threat.” [7] Hecht goes on to further elaborate:

Owing to his job as a radiological monitor, Bradley focuses much more squarely on radiation dangers than Hersey had; the prologue introduces readers to the Independence, one of the ships in the target area of the tests. He describes the visible damage it took during the two bomb blasts, but quickly changes to a “more impressive” consequence: “the disease of radioactivity lingers on her decks and sides and along her dingy corridors.” He then repeats this comparison, emphasizing that the ship had survived the air blast of Able and the tidal wave of Baker. “But the invisible poison of radioactivity,” Bradley writes, “she could not throw off”. [7]

Hecht was making comparisons to John Hersey’s 1946 book, Hiroshima. Whereas Hersey made the unimaginable act relatable with his book, Bradley noted that it would be hard to make the threat of radiation relatable to people based on the readout on a Geiger counter. In one memorable instance in the book, Bradley has to convince a Navy chief that the ship on which his men had just finished scrubbing and hosing down again and again with soap, lye, and wire brushes, was still just as contaminated with radiation as it was before they started. No person should be aboard its decks. The Navy chief was hard to sell on the Geiger warnings and was baffled at how a thoroughly cleaned ship could still be deadlier than the blast itself. The book alerted the world to radioactive fallout from nuclear weapons explosions. [4] [6]

Bradley toured lecturing on the dangers of fallout, including a 1950 lecture at Ford Hall Forum. The book was reissued with an epilogue in 1984.[4]
