= Carrie Sheinberg =

American alpine skier

Carrie Sheinberg (born November 29, 1972) is an American former alpine skier.

== Biography ==
Sheinberg, who is Jewish, was born in New York, New York. She lives in Port Washington, New York, where she grew up, and in Park City, Utah.

A slalom skier, Sheinberg was named to the US Ski Team at the age of 17 and was a team member for eight years. She skied in the slalom event at the 1994 Winter Olympics in Lillehammer, Norway, and was the top US finisher in the event. She won the US alpine 1995 combined title (in Park City) and 1997 slalom titles, and the 1997 giant slalom at the US Alpine Championships in Sugarloaf, Maine. She retired in 1998.

Sheinberg then attended the University of Utah, and was a sports reporter for the Salt Lake Tribune. After two years as a producer for ESPN Radio, she worked as a reporter for Sirius Satellite Radio.
