= Cary Adgate =

American alpine skier (born 1953)

Cary Adgate (born August 21, 1953, in Lansing, Michigan) is a former United States Ski Team member from Boyne Falls, Michigan. He is a two time Olympian, six time national champion, and national pro champion. Adgate was recently inducted into the U.S. National Ski and Snowboard Hall of Fame.
