= Tiger Shaw =

Tiger Shaw may refer to:

- Jock Shaw (1912–2000), nicknamed Tiger, Scottish footballer
- Tiger Shaw (alpine skier) (born 1961), former American alpine ski racer
