= David J. Bradley =

American politician (1915–2008)

- Born: February 22, 1915
- Died: January 7, 2008 (aged 92)
- Education: Harvard Medical School
- Occupation: Writer
- Political party: Democratic

David John Bradley (February 22, 1915 – January 7, 2008) was an American writer, surgeon, politician and champion skier.

His best-selling 1948 book No Place to Hide, a memoir of the Bikini atomic bomb tests, alerted the world to the dangers of radioactive fallout from nuclear weapon explosions.

Bradley was elected as a Democrat to the New Hampshire House of Representatives, serving 1955–59 and 1973–75.

== Education ==
Dr. Bradley was a 1938 graduate of Dartmouth College and a graduate of Harvard Medical School. He also attended Cambridge University to study English and history, but did not receive a degree. His papers are housed at Dartmouth's Rauner Library.

== Ski career ==
In 1938 Dr. Bradley won the United States Nordic combined event. Prior to its cancelation, Dr. Bradley was also a member of the 1940 Winter Olympics ski team. He went on to manage the United States Nordic ski team for the 1960 Winter Olympics. In 1985 Dr. Bradley was inducted into the United States National Ski and Snowboard Hall of Fame.
