= Katy Rodolph =

American alpine skier

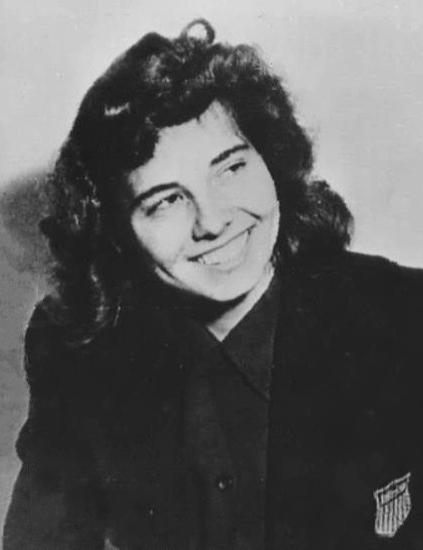
- Rodolph in 1952

Personal information
- Full name: Catherine Louise Rodolph
- Born: November 1, 1930 Denver, Colorado, U.S.
- Died: September 17, 1994 (aged 63) Las Vegas, Nevada, U.S.
- Height: 5 ft 7 in (1.70 m)

Skiing career
- Sport: Alpine skiing
- Retired: January 1956 (age 25)
- Disciplines: Downhill, giant slalom, slalom, combined

Olympics
- Teams: 2 – (1952, 1956 (injured))
- Medals: 0

World Championships
- Teams: 4 – (1950, 1952, 1954, 1956) includes Olympics
- Medals: 0

Catherine Louise "Katy" Rodolph (November 1, 1930 – September 17, 1994) was an alpine ski racer from the United States. She was a member of four world championship and Olympic teams in the 1950s.

At age 19, Rodolph was the top North American in two of the three races at the 1950 World Championships in Aspen, with a fifth in the downhill and eighth in the giant slalom. She also finished fifth in the giant slalom at the 1952 Olympics in Oslo, Norway, and fifth in the combined at the 1954 World Championships in Åre, Sweden. Named to the 1956 Olympic team, she incurred neck and knee fractures in downhill training at Kitzbühel on January 14, less than two weeks before the games began at Cortina d'Ampezzo.

Born in Denver, Colorado, Rodolph grew up in Hayden and learned to ski and race at nearby Howelsen Hill in Steamboat Springs. She won nine national titles and was later a race official. While on the U.S. Ski Team in the early 1950s, she resided in Sun Valley, Idaho, and worked as a waitress.

Rodolph was featured on the cover of Newsweek magazine in January 1952, and was inducted into the U.S. Ski Hall of Fame in 1966.

== Personal ==
While still in plaster from her Kitzbühel injuries, Rodolph married William Wyatt, an officer in the U.S. Air Force, in a civil ceremony in Las Vegas in February 1956. It was her second marriage; her first (1951–53) was to Paul Wegeman, an Olympic Nordic ski jumper and racer from Steamboat Springs.

That marriage was kept secret for nearly a year, until the 1952 Winter Olympics in February, when rumors of a romance between Rodolph and new gold medalist Stein Eriksen made the wire services. After a crash on his third jump in the Nordic combined, Wegeman suffered a mild concussion and was hospitalized.

In Oslo, the couple came forward to announce their marriage twelve months earlier in Raton, New Mexico and dispel the rumors, but with consequences. At the Olympics, Wegeman was on temporary leave from training as a naval aviation cadet, and U.S. Navy regulations required candidates to be unmarried. Wegeman was removed from the program and then served enlisted duty in Guam. Rodolph moved to Reno and worked as a waitress, and gained a divorce in January 1953.

The Wyatts settled in Las Vegas and raised three children. Rodolph-Wyatt died of complications of a rare blood disease at age 63 in 1994.

== World championship results ==
Year	Age	Slalom	Giant Slalom	Super-G	Downhill	Combined
1950	19	10	8	not run	5	not awarded
1952	21	21	5	not run	23	not awarded
1954	23	10	11	not run	T-10	5
1956	25	injured, did not compete				

From 1948 through 1980, the Winter Olympics were also the World Championships for alpine skiing.

== Olympic results ==
Year	Age	Slalom	Giant Slalom	Super-G	Downhill	Combined
1952	21	21	5	not run	23	not run
1956	25	injured, did not compete				
