= Chuck Ferries =

American alpine skier (1939–2025)

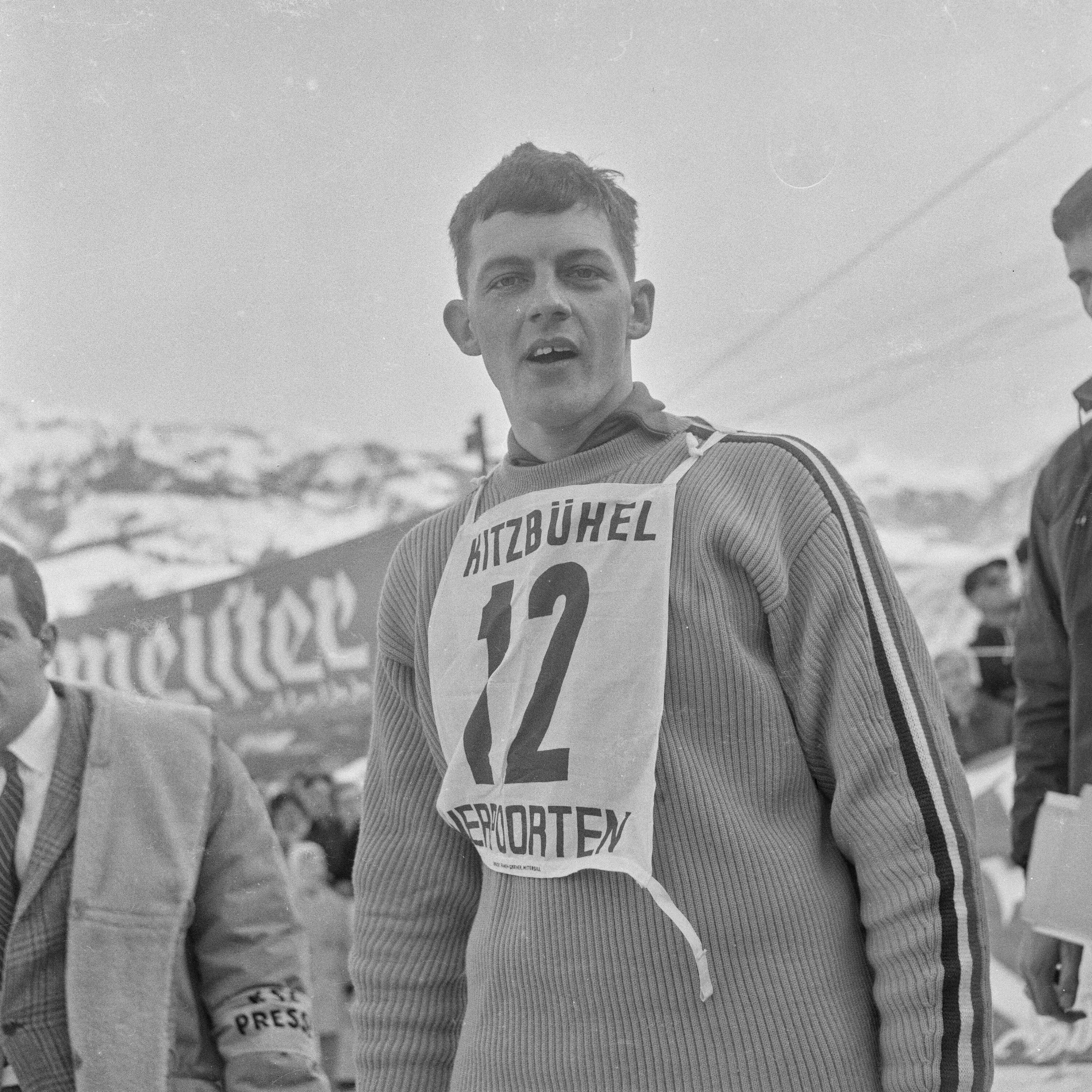
Ferries at the 1962 Hahnenkamm Races

Charles T. Ferries (June 10, 1939 – April 17, 2025) was an American alpine ski racer, as well as an Olympian in 1960 and 1964. In 1962, Ferries became the first American to win a European classic gate race, the Hahnenkamm slalom, at Kitzbühel.

Bob Beattie called Ferries "the most unknown great ski racer in U.S. history." If relatively unknown to later generations, Ferries nonetheless was featured on the March 11, 1963 cover of Sports Illustrated. With Ferries depicted in sketch, the caption reads, "Best U.S. Skier."

Ferries worked in the ski industry, coached the United States Ski Team, and served as Chair of the U.S. Ski and Snowboard Association. In 1989, Ferries was inducted into the United States National Ski Hall of Fame. In 2007, Ferries received the U.S. Ski and Snowboard Association's Blegen Award, which is the USSA's most prestigious honor for service to the organization. The following year, Ferries was inducted to the Colorado Ski & Snowboard Hall of Fame as part of its Class of 2008.

Ferries died on April 17, 2025, at the age of 85.
