= Chris Puckett =

American alpine skier (born 1970)

Christopher Puckett (born June 11, 1970 in Wheat Ridge, Colorado) is a former American alpine skier who competed in the men's giant slalom at the 1992 Winter Olympics.

He is the brother of Olympian Casey Puckett.
