= Jack Nagel (alpine skier) =

American alpine skier (1926–2004)

Personal information
- Born: January 30, 1926 Port Townsend, Washington, U.S.
- Died: March 11, 2004 (aged 78) Spokane, Washington, U.S.

Sport
- Sport: Alpine skiing

Jack Nagel (January 30, 1926 – March 11, 2004) was an American alpine ski racer. He competed in two events at the 1952 Winter Olympics.

Born in Port Townsend and raised in Skykomish, Nagel was a third-generation logger when skiing was gaining popularity in the 1940s. He later ran the only gas station in Skykomish and was a ski instructor at Stevens Pass until 1962, when the new Crystal Mountain opened near Mount Rainier and the family relocated to Enumclaw. Nagel headed the ski school and race program; the racing school was featured in Sports Illustrated in 1963, with older daughter Cathy, 14, on the cover.

Younger daughter Judy Nagel was an Olympian and World Cup racer. At age sixteen in 1968, she led the Olympic slalom after the first run, but did not finish the second.

== Olympic results ==
Year	Age	Slalom	Giant Slalom	Super-G	Downhill	Combined
1952	26	DNF1	29	not run	—	not run
