= Gordi Eaton =

American alpine skier (born 1939)

Personal information
- Full name: Gordon Ladd Eaton
- Born: November 28, 1939 (age 86) Littleton, New Hampshire, U.S.
- Height: 5 ft 10 in (178 cm)
- Spouse: Karen Budge

Sport
- Sport: Alpine skiing

Gordon Ladd Eaton (born November 28, 1939), known as Gordi Eaton, is an American alpine skier. He competed in the men's downhill at the 1960 Winter Olympics. Eaton is a Middlebury College Class of 1962 graduate, and competed on the school's alpine ski team.

Eaton married Karen Budge, a former alpine ski racer. They reside in Middlebury, Vermont and co-own a restaurant in Lincoln, New Hampshire, in the White Mountains near Loon Mountain and Cannon Mountain ski areas.
