= Kathleen Monahan =

American alpine skier (born 1972)

Kathleen "Katie" Monahan (born November 9, 1972, in Aspen, Colorado) is an American former alpine skier who competed in the 1998 Winter Olympics and 2002 Winter Olympics. In 1992 she made her debut in the FIS World Cup, where she competed in Downhills and Super-Gs. Though her last World Cup appearance was in December 2002, she didn't retire from skiing until 2004.
