= Tom Corcoran (skier) =

American alpine skier

Thomas Corcoran (November 16, 1931 – June 27, 2017), better known as Tom Corcoran, was a four-time United States national champion in alpine skiing and a two-time Olympian. In addition to seven years of international ski racing, Corcoran also raced competitively for Dartmouth College and would later earn an MBA from Harvard Business School.

After his alpine racing career, Corcoran opened the Waterville Valley Resort in New Hampshire. He served as an executive at the ski area until 1990.

Corcoran was inducted into the National Ski Hall of Fame in 1978 and was presented with the first New England Ski Museum Spirit of Skiing award in 2006. He died at Seabrook Island, South Carolina on June 27, 2017, at the age of 85.

== See also ==
- Waterville Valley Resort
