= Dick Durrance II =

American photographer

Dick Durrance II (born 1942, Seattle, Washington) is an American photographer.

== Early life ==
Durrance was born in Seattle, Washington state, USA, in 1942 but grew up in Aspen, Colorado. He is the son of skier Dick Durrance and his wife Margaret.

After studying at Phillips Academy Andover, Durrance entered Dartmouth College where he majored in art. While at Dartmouth he served as class president and captained the ski team.

== Photographic career ==
In 1967 and 1968, Durrance served his military service as a combat photographer in the United States Department of the Army Special Photographic Office. His job was to document military activities in southeast Asia, including South Vietnam. He was placed in three awards in the 1968 Military Pictures of the Year competition, winning first place for News, second place for Features, and third place for Portrait, all with pictures from Vietnam. A book based on his Vietnam images, Where War Lives, was published in 1988.

Following his military service Durrance joined the National Geographic in January 1969, remaining there for seven years. While at National Geographic, he photographed stories across the globe, including South Africa, the Soviet Union (Leningrad), Brazil (São Paulo), and the North Sea region, while also covering topics closer to home in Alabama and Aspen. Durrance's work is featured in three National Geographic landscape books:

- In the Footsteps of Lewis and Clark
- The Appalachian Trail, and
- The Majestic Rocky Mountains

In 1976 Durrance left the staff of the National Geographic to focus on corporate photography, producing photographs to be used in advertising. He was later joined in this endeavour by his wife, Susan G. Drinker. In 1987 he received the peer award of Advertising Photographer of the Year from the American Society of Media Photographers (ASMP).

In 1992 Drinker and Durrance created Drinker/Durrance Graphics., and from 1993 Durrance changed directions again, moving away from corporate advertising to nature photography. With his wife, Drinker, Durrance produced portfolios of panoramic photographs from the quieter areas of US National Parks that were published as images on postcards and posters. This project was expanded in 1995 to include golf and golf courses, expanding on Durrance's love of golf.

In 2004 Durrance was selected as one of the Founding Members of the Academy for Golf Art.

=== Awards ===
- 1972 Photographer of the Year, White House News Photographers Association
- 1987 Advertising Photographer of the Year, American Society of Media Photographers
- 1991 Presidential Medal for Outstanding Leadership and Achievement, Dartmouth College

He has also won the National Press Photographers Association's Picture of the Year award four times.

== Select Bibliography ==
- Where War Lives (Farrar, Straus, Giroux, 1988)
- Golfers (Andrews McMeel, 2000)
- The PGA Tour: A Look Behind the Scenes (Andrews McMeel, 2002)
