= Casey Puckett =

American alpine skier (born 1972)

Medal record

Men's freestyle skiing

Representing the United States

Winter X Games
Gold medal – first place	2007 Aspen	Ski Cross
Bronze medal – third place	2008 Aspen	Ski Cross
Bronze medal – third place	2011 Aspen	Ski Cross

Paul Casey Puckett (born September 22, 1972) is an American alpine skier who competed from 1990 to 2006 and freestyle skier who has competed since 2008.

== Alpine skiing ==
As an alpine skier, his best World Cup finish was fourth in a combined event in Austria in 2001. Puckett also competed in four Winter Olympics, earning his best finish of seventh in the slalom event at Lillehammer in 1994. His best finish at the FIS Alpine World Ski Championships was 23rd in the giant slalom event at St. Anton in 2001.

== Freestyle skiing ==
Switching to freestyle skiing in ski cross in 2008, Puckett's best World Cup was second three times was in skicross events in 2008 and 2009. His best finish at the FIS Freestyle World Ski Championships was fifth in ski cross at Inawashiro in 2009.

Puckett competed in his fifth Olympics, and first as a freestyle skier, in the Ski Cross at the 2010 Winter Olympics.

== Personal life ==
His brother is Olympian Chris Puckett.
