= Kyle Wieche =

American alpine skier (born 1967)

Kyle Wieche (born July 30, 1967 in Hartford, Connecticut) is an American former alpine skier who competed in the 1992 Winter Olympics. He was raised in Farmington, Connecticut.
