= Nancy Reynolds =

American ballerina

Nancy Reynolds is the director of research and founder of the George Balanchine Foundation and a 2013 recipient of a Bessie award for Outstanding Service to the Field of Dance. Reynolds is a former dancer with the New York City Ballet. She is the author of several books on dance including No Fixed Points: Dance in the Twentieth Century (with Malcolm McCormick). Shelley C. Berg, writing in the Dance Research Journal, called the book an "invaluable contribution to the literature of dance history" and that the authors had succeeded in "capturing the vitality of performance".
