= Sacha Gros =

American alpine skier (born 1974)

Sacha Gros (born November 27, 1974, in Glenwood Springs, Colorado) is an American former alpine skier who competed in the 1998 Winter Olympics.
