= Luke Winters =

American alpine skier (born 1997)

Personal information
- Born: April 2, 1997 (age 29) Gresham, Oregon, U.S.

Skiing career
- Country: United States
- Sport: Alpine skiing
- Club: Mount Hood Race Team and Academy
- Disciplines: Slalom, giant slalom
- World Cup debut: November 18, 2018 (age 21)

Olympics
- Teams: 1 – (2022)
- Medals: 0

World Championships
- Teams: 3 – (2021, 2023, 2025)
- Medals: 1 (1 gold)

World Cup
- Seasons: 4 – (2019–2022)
- Podiums: 0
- Overall titles: 0 – (62nd in 2022)
- Discipline titles: 0 – (23rd in SL, 2022)
Medal record
Men's alpine skiing
Representing the United States
World Championships
Gold medal – first place	2023 Méribel	Team event
World Junior Championships
Bronze medal – third place	2018 Davos	Super-G

Luke Winters (born April 2, 1997) is an American World Cup alpine ski racer. He was a medalist at the Junior World Championships in 2018. At the World Cup level, Winters focuses on the technical events of slalom and giant slalom.

== Career ==
At the 2018 Junior World Championships in Davos, Switzerland, Winters won the bronze medal in the Super-G, was ninth in the downhill, and 22nd in the Alpine combined. In November 2018, he made his World Cup debut in the slalom at Levi, Finland. The following March, he gained his first national championship title, winning the alpine combined at Sugarloaf, Maine. He followed that up with his second national title, in slalom at Waterville Valley.

In December 2019, he scored his first World Cup points at 19th place in the slalom at Val-d'Isère, France; he was second after the first run with bib 40. At his first World Championships in 2021, he was fifteenth after the first run of the slalom but failed to finish.

He has qualified to represent the United States at the 2022 Winter Olympics.

== Personal life ==
Born and raised in Gresham, Oregon, a suburb east of Portland, Winters learned to race at Mount Hood. He attended Sugar Bowl Academy, a ski academy in northern California near Lake Tahoe, and graduated in 2015. Winters has a twin brother, two sisters, and two great parents.

== World Cup results ==
=== Season standings ===
Season	Age	Overall	Slalom	Giant slalom	Super-G	Downhill	Combined
2019	21	no World Cup points					
2020	22	127	49	—	—	—	—
2021	23	116	39	—	—	—	—N/a
2022	24	62	23	—	—	—	—N/a
2023	25	93	31	—	—	—	—N/a

=== Top 20 results ===
- 0 podiums; 3 top tens

Season	Date	Location	Discipline	Place
2020	15 December 2019	Val-d'Isère, France	Slalom	19th
2021	31 January 2021	Chamonix, France	Slalom	19th
2022	9 January 2022	Adelboden, Switzerland	Slalom	10th
2022	22 January 2022	Kitzbühel, Austria	Slalom	11th
2022	9 March 2022	Flachau, Austria	Slalom	7th
2022	20 March 2022	Méribel, France	Slalom	8th
2023	4 January 2023	Garmisch-Partenkirchen, Germany	Slalom	11th
2023	4 February 2023	Chamonix, France	Slalom	12th

== World Championship results ==
Year	Age	Slalom	Giant slalom	Super-G	Downhill	Combined	Team Combined	Parallel	Team event
2021	23	DNF2	—	—	—	—	—N/a	—	—
2023	25	30	—	—	—	—	—N/a	—	1
2025	27	DNF2	—	—	—	—N/a	—	—N/a	—

== Olympic results ==
Year	Age	Slalom	Giant Slalom	Super-G	Downhill	Combined
2022	24	DNF1	DNF1	—	—	—

== World Junior Championship results ==
Year	Age	Slalom	Giant slalom	Super-G	Downhill	Combined
2018	20	DNF2	DNF1	3	9	22

== United States Championships ==
- United States slalom champion in 2019 and 2020
- United States combined champion in 2019 and 2021
