= Tim Jitloff =

American alpine skier (born 1985)

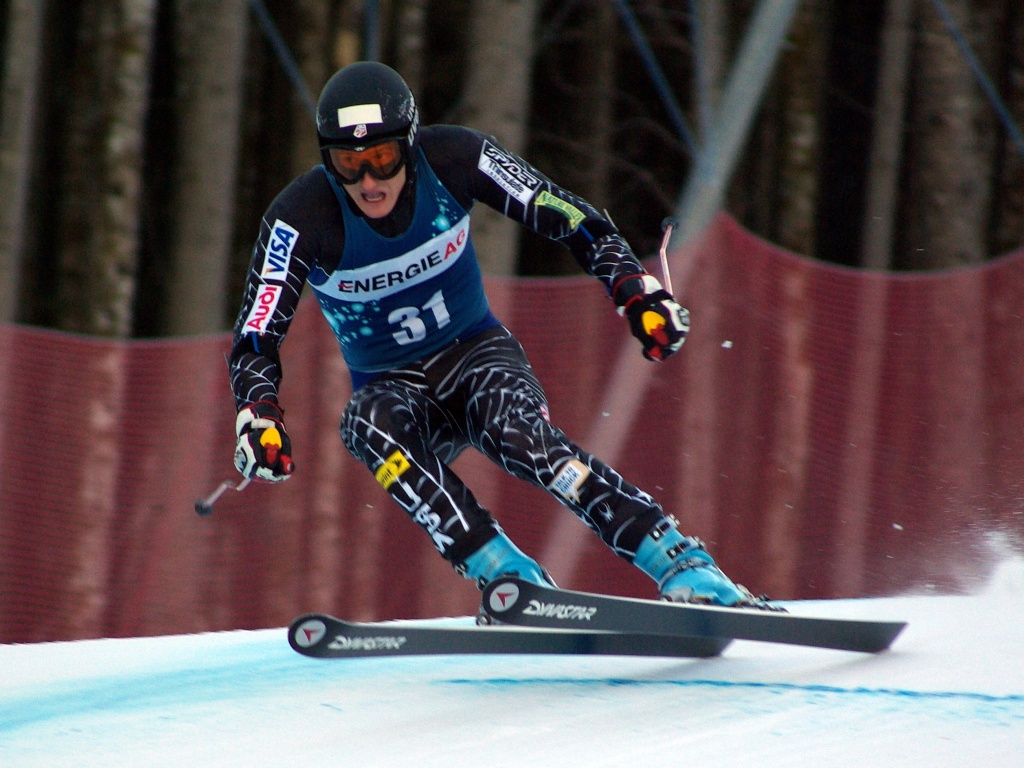
- Jitloff in January 2008

Personal information
- Born: January 11, 1985 (age 41) Reno, Nevada, U.S.
- Height: 5 ft 11 in (180 cm)
- Website: timjitloff.com

Skiing career
- Sport: Alpine skiing
- Club: Park City Ski Ed Foundation
- Retired: March 2018 (age 33)
- Disciplines: Giant slalom
- World Cup debut: December 17, 2006 (age 21)

Olympics
- Teams: 2 – (2014, 2018)
- Medals: 0

World Championships
- Teams: 6 – (2007–2017)
- Medals: 0

World Cup
- Seasons: 10 – (2009–2018)
- Podiums: 0
- Overall titles: 0 – (50th in 2014)
- Discipline titles: 0 – (17th in GS, 2015)

Timothy Matthew Jitloff (born January 11, 1985) is a retired World Cup alpine ski racer from the United States. He specializes in giant slalom and competed in five World Championships and two Winter Olympics.

Born in Reno, Nevada, Jitloff was named to the U.S. Development Team with the 2005 season and moved from the 20s in 2004 NorAms into the teens and single-number results during Winter 2005 as he also saw his first racing in Europe. He has since been a member of the 2007 FIS Alpine World Ski Championships Team. He made the US team for the 2010 Winter Olympics in late 2009 and competed in the giant slalom for the United States in the 2014 Winter Olympics.

Jitloff retired from international competition in March 2018.

== Career highlights ==
2005 – Sprint/Ski Racing Junior Skier of the Year. Also the combined gold medalist at the Junior World Championships.

2007 – NorAm giant slalom champion with two wins

== Injuries ==
2006 – An injured left ACL ended his season early

== World Cup results ==
=== Season standings ===
Season	Age	Overall	Slalom	Giant Slalom	Super G	Downhill	Combined
2009	24	75	49	28	—	—	—
2010	25	136	—	48	—	—	—
2011	26	99	—	39	—	—	23
2012	27	78	—	27	—	—	—
2013	28	82	—	29	—	—	—
2014	29	50	—	18	—	—	19
2015	30	60	—	17	48	—	36
2016	31	76	—	25	—	—	—
2017	32	103	—	34	—	—	—
2018	33	98	—	31	—	—	—

=== Top ten finishes ===
- 0 podiums; 2 top fives

Season	Date	Location	Discipline	Place
2009	12 Feb 2009	Sestriere, Italy	Giant slalom	5th
2011	26 Feb 2011	Bansko, Bulgaria	Super combined	8th
2012	6 Dec 2011	(United States) Beaver Creek, USA	Giant slalom	10th
2014	22 Dec 2013	Alta Badia, Italy	Giant slalom	5th
2014	8 Mar 2014	Kranjska Gora, Slovenia	Giant slalom	8th
2015	7 Dec 2014	(United States) Beaver Creek, USA	Giant slalom	9th
2015	1 Mar 2015	Garmisch, Germany	Giant slalom	10th
2016	20 Dec 2015	Alta Badia, Italy	Giant slalom	7th
2016	21 Dec 2015	Alta Badia, Italy	Parallel giant slalom	9th

== World Championship results ==
Year	Age	Slalom	Giant Slalom	Super-G	Downhill	Combined
2007	22	25	18	—	—	—
2009	24	22	26	—	—	—
2011	26	—	—	—	—	14
2013	28	—	16	—	—	—
2015	30	—	9	—	—	17
2017	32	—	DNF1	—	—	—

== Olympic results ==
Year	Age	Slalom	Giant Slalom	Super-G	Downhill	Combined
2014	29	—	15	—	—	—
2018	33	—	DNF1	—	—	—
