= Zola Mashariki =

American attorney, film producer and executive

Zola Mashariki (born Los Angeles, United States) is an American attorney, film producer and executive. She is the head of Audible Studios. Mashariki also served as the Head of Original Programming and Executive Vice President of BET Network. She was also the Senior Vice President of Production for Fox Searchlight Pictures.

== Early life and career ==
Zola Mashariki Reyes was born in Los Angeles, California. Mashariki attended Dartmouth College where she studied Arts and obtained a Bachelor of Arts from the institution in 1994. After attending Dartmouth College she enrolled in Harvard Law School in 1994 and obtained a Doctor of Law. She taught at the University of South California.

Mashariki started her career in 2000 when started working for Fox Searchlight Pictures as the Senior Vice President, Production. Between 2000 and 2015 some of her successful projects with Searchlight were book adaptations including The Best Exotic Marigold Hotel, The Last King of Scotland, The Secret Life of Bees, In America, Never Let Me Go and Antwone Fisher. While at Searchlight during the acquisition process she also worked on Slumdog Millionaire and 12 Years a Slave.

In 2015, she was announced as head of original programming at BET. Mashariki led the creative team and oversaw the programming for BET and Centric Networks. Mashariki also executive produced and developed The New Edition Story which gave BET its highest ratings in a decade and won two NAACP Image Awards. She has collaborated with Laurence Fishburne on Nelson Mandela's miniseries Madiba and with John Singleton on his series Rebel.

Mashariki joined Good Films, LLC as its chief content officer where she was in charge of its 2020 film Just Mercy, starring Michael B. Jordan, Jamie Foxx and Brie Larson. She is the co-founder of the African Grove Institute for the Arts.

Mashariki was named as the head of Audible Studios in April 2021.

== Filmography ==
Year	Title	Role
2019	Jezebel	Executive producer
2017	The New Edition Story	Executive producer
