= Jannette Burr =

American alpine skier (1927–2022)

Jannette Weston Burr
- Born: April 30, 1927; Seattle, Washington
- Died: July 26, 2022 (aged 95)
- Occupation: Professional alpine skier

Jannette Weston Burr (April 30, 1927 – July 26, 2022) was an American former professional alpine skier from Sun Valley, Idaho. She learned to ski in Sun Valley and competed in races across the globe during the 1950s, winning medals in many of them. In 1970, she was inducted into the U.S. Ski and Snowboard Hall of Fame.

== Career overview ==
Burr was born in Seattle, Washington. She began water skiing in the early 1940s, but had not learned how to alpine ski until a few years prior to competing professionally. About a year before her first downhill race, Burr went to Sun Valley Ski Resort on a "Learn-to-Ski Week" package, where she found that she enjoyed alpine skiing. She became known as 'Next', the girl who went downhill very fast without turning or slowing down, something that had come as a result of her not knowing how to do these things. In 1950 Sally Neidlinger approached Burr about trying out for the FIS Team along with her. Initially unaware of what the FIS Team was, Burr accompanied Neidlinger and both women won their tryouts. After making the team, Burr went on to win several races on the national and international competition level, eventually making it into the U.S. Ski and Snowboard Hall of Fame. She also became an instructor at Sun Valley Ski School, where she worked for 37 years. She also appeared in the television series The Lucy-Desi Comedy Hour for the season one episode "Lucy Goes to Sun Valley", as Lucille Ball's stunt double.

== Harriman Cup ==
- The annual Harriman Cup is held in Sun Valley, Idaho
  - Burr won the Downhill five times throughout her career here.

== Winter Olympics ==
- The 1952 Winter Olympics took place in Oslo, Norway.
  - Burr competed in the Downhill, Giant Slalom, and Slalom, but did not place in any.

== FIS World Championships ==
- The 1954 World Championships took place in Åre, Sweden
  - She received a bronze medal in the Giant Slalom and got 4th in the Downhill

== Austrian Championships ==
- The 1954 Austrian Ski Championships took place in Bad Gastein, Austria
  - Burr won both the Giant Slalom and Downhill but, since she is not Austrian, she was not eligible for the titles.

== Arlberg-Kandahar ==
- The 1954 Garmisch Classic took place in Bavaria, Germany
  - Here she placed second in the combined competition.
