= Whitefish Mountain Resort =

Ski resort in Montana, United States

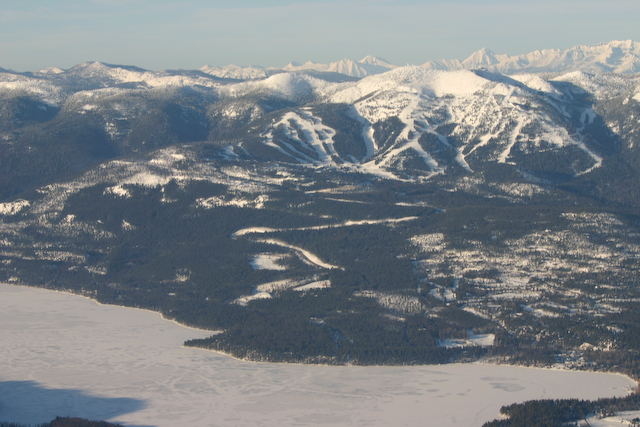
- Aerial view in February 2008

- Location in the United States Location in Montana
- Location: The Big Mountain; Flathead National Forest; Flathead County, Montana, U.S.
- Nearest city: Whitefish - 4 miles (6 km); Columbia Falls - 16 mi (26 km); Kalispell - 21 miles (34 km); Missoula - 140 miles (230 km); Spokane - 260 miles (420 km)
- Coordinates: 48.50°N 114.34°W
- Vertical: 2,353 ft (717 m)
- Top elevation: 6,817 ft (2,078 m)
- Base elevation: 4,464 ft (1,361 m)
- Skiable area: 3,020 acres (12.2 km^{2})
- Trails: 93: 15% beginner; 35% intermediate; 40% advanced; 10% expert
- Longest run: 2.52 miles (4.06 km) - Hell Fire
- Lift system: 12 chairs: 3 high-speed quad; 1 high speed detachable six-pack); 8 fixed-grip (2 quad, 6 triple); 3 surface tows
- Terrain parks: 1
- Snowfall: 300 inches (25 ft; 760 cm)
- Snowmaking: yes
- Night skiing: Fri & Sat - lower lifts
- Website: skiwhitefish.com

Whitefish Mountain Resort is a ski resort on Big Mountain in northwestern Montana. It is west of Glacier National Park in the Flathead National Forest, four miles (6 km) from the town of Whitefish, sixteen miles (26 km) west of Columbia Falls, and 21 miles (34 km) north of Kalispell.

== History ==
Winter Sports, Inc. (WSI) formed 79 years ago in 1947 as a public company of community shareholders, opened Big Mountain that December 14. It hosted the U.S. Alpine Championships in early March 1949, where future Olympic champion Andrea Mead of Vermont won all three women's titles at age sixteen. The mountain originally had a single T-bar, which was replaced by chairlifts installed in 1960, and 1968.

Olympic champion Tommy Moe (b.1970) learned to ski and race at the mountain, where his father was on the ski patrol. Moe won the gold medal in the downhill and the silver in the super-G at the 1994 Winter Olympics in Lillehammer, Norway.

The mountain again hosted the U.S. Alpine Championships in 2001. That event is remembered for the failed comeback attempt, and life-altering crash, of 1984 Olympic downhill champion Bill Johnson.

In May 2004, WSI conducted a 150-for-one reverse stock split. Its stated purpose was to lower expense by reducing the number of shareholders to below the threshold that imposed public reporting requirements. At the time the transaction was proposed, 664 shareholders, or 72% of investors in the company, each separately held less than 150 shares. In total, these investors held a 2.5% equity (and voting) stake. The board expressed concern that the transaction might be viewed as coercive, but after review and outside consultation, decided the transaction was fair to the affected shareholders.

In December 2006, WSI conducted a 15-for-one reverse stock split, further reducing to about 50 remaining shareholders in order to provide a tax advantage as a Subchapter S corporation. Again, all shareholders without enough shares to exchange for a post-split share were required to cash-out their stock. WSI's handling of the reverse split was criticized and resulted in animosity within the local community, where there were objections to the timing of the related announcements and the loss of a community connection to the resort by the local residents.

After sixty years, Big Mountain was renamed "Whitefish Mountain Resort" in June 2007, after billionaire Bill Foley became the majority shareholder of Winter Sports, Inc.

In early 2008, an avalanche occurred in the Flathead National Forest, within hiking distance of the backside of Big Mountain and killed two skiers on January 13. Later that year, the resort discontinued summer lift access for winter season pass holders, granting several free lift tickets instead. In September of that same year, the resort reversed the decision and announced that 2008–09 winter season passes would again convey unlimited foot-passenger lift access for summer 2009.

== Lifts and runs ==
The mountain is separated into three faces. The front side is primarily serviced by the Big Mountain Express high-speed quad out of the Village base area and the Snow Ghost Express high speed six pack from the Base Lodge, and has the most skiable terrain. A second high-speed quad, the Swift Creek Express (formerly the Glacier Chaser), services beginner and intermediate terrain. The front side has seven of the mountain's eleven chairlifts.

The backside of the mountain is serviced by the Big Creek Express, also a high-speed quad. The backside has more tree skiing terrain, and additional terrain can be accessed by the Bigfoot T-Bar on weekends and during select holiday periods, as well as Flower Point (a used triple chairlift acquired from Kimberley Alpine Resort), and East Rim (a triple chairlift relocated from the Glacier View alignment), which services the eastern front side and East Rim.

The western aspect of the mountain contains the Hellroaring basin. Serviced by Hellroaring (a triple chairlift), Hellroaring basin is the most advanced skiing on the mountain with cliffs, vertical chutes, and tight tree skiing. The intermediate Hell Fire trail is the longest on the mountain; it runs 2.52 miles (4.06 km) from the summit to the base of Chair 8. On some days the clouds at Whitefish Mountain Resort are low enough that skiers can literally ski above the clouds.

=== Lifts ===
- Whitefish currently has 14 operating lifts.

Number	Name	Type	Manufacturer	Built	Vertical (feet)	Length (feet)	Notes
Chair 4	Snow Ghost Express	High speed six pack	Leitner-Poma	2022	2224	7211	
Chair 7	Big Creek Express	High Speed Quad	Doppelmayr USA	1997	1211	5743	
Chair 1	Big Mountain Express	High Speed Quad	Doppelmayr USA	2007	2087	7322	Main lift out of Village base area.
Chair 2	Swift Creek Express	High Speed Quad	Doppelmayr USA	2007	1110	-	1 of 3 lifts open for night skiing. Originally Glacier Chaser Express prior to 2007.
Chair 6	Base Lodge	Quad	CTEC	1992	240	1535	
Chair 9	Easy Rider	Quad	Garaventa CTEC	2006	269	-	
Chair 3	Tenderfoot	Triple	Thiokol	1975	443	2452	Oldest lift on the mountain, and also open for night skiing.
Chair 12	Elk Highlands	Triple	Hall	2007	375	-	Has 2 way directional loading, and has a mid-station. Relocated from Easy Rider.
Chair 10	Bad Rock	Triple	Thiokol	2011	461	-	
Chair 11	Flower Point	Triple	Yan	2014	970	-	Relocated from Kimberley Alpine Resort
Chair 5	East Rim	Triple	CTEC	2017	805	2388	Relocated from Glacier View
Chair 8	Hellroaring	Triple	CTEC	2021	1082	-	Originally opened in 1985 as Big Creek, relocated to a lower alignment in Hellroaring Basin in 1997, relocated to current alignment in 2021.
T-Bar 1	Heritage	T-Bar	Doppelmayr	1982	568	1964	Open on weekends.
T-Bar 2	Bigfoot	T-Bar	Doppelmayr	2000	400	-	

The vertical drop of the ski area is 2,353 feet (717 m), with a summit elevation of 6,817 ft (2,078 m) and a base of 4,464 ft (1,361 m). The average annual snowfall is 300 inches (760 cm).

The ski area is about nineteen miles (31 km) north of Glacier Park International Airport and 35 miles (56 km) south of the Canada–US border.
