= United States Ski Team =

Representative of United States in skiing

The U.S. Ski Team, operating under the auspices of U.S. Ski & Snowboard, develops and supports men's and women's athletes in the sports of alpine skiing, freestyle skiing, cross-country, ski jumping, and Nordic combined. Since 1974 the team and association have been headquartered in Park City, Utah.

These individuals represent the best athletes in the country for their respective sports and compete as a team at the national, world and Olympic level.

== History ==
*The first U.S. Ski Team was officially named in 1965 for the 1966 season, however the United States participated in skiing at all Olympic Winter Games and sent various athletes to World Championships prior to the '66 season.

=== 1860s–1880s early ski clubs and ski tournaments in the U.S. ===
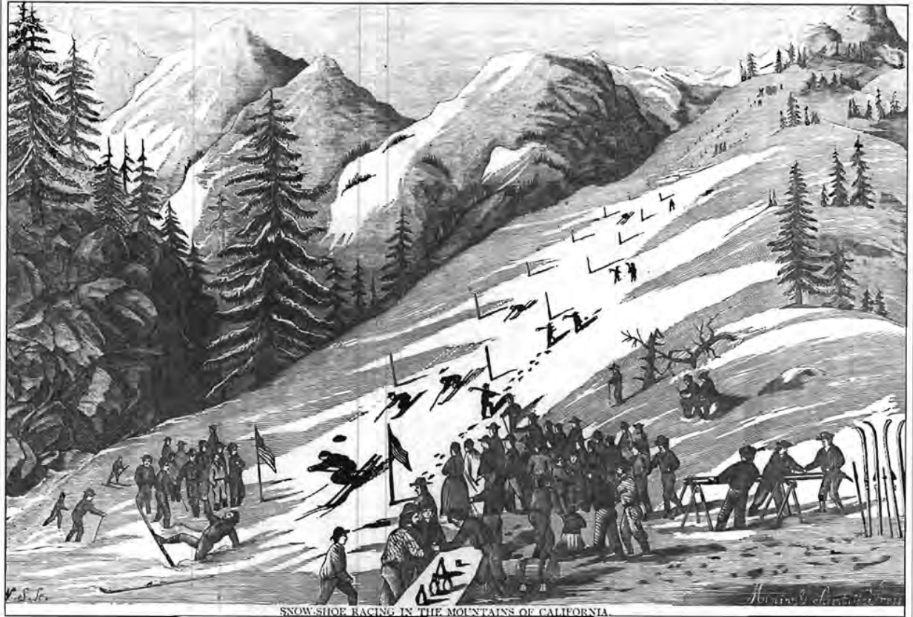
Sierra Longboard Racing, 1874

Ski clubs appeared in the United States starting in 1861, in California. Norwegian "snowshoe" downhill races are noted in Sierra and Rocky Mountain mining camps. The Nansen Ski Club of Berlin, New Hampshire, founded in 1872 by Norwegian immigrants and named in honor of Norway's legendary Arctic explorer Fridtjof Nansen, remains active. Annual ski jumping tournaments began in Great Lakes mining and timber regions. The Saint Paul Winter Carnival included skiing events starting in 1888.

=== 1891–1893 Central Ski Association of the Northwest tournaments ===
A regional ski association was formed in 1891 to organize tournaments featuring ski jumping and cross-country competition by the Eau Claire (Dovre), Ishpeming (Norden), Stillwater (Norwegian), Red Wing (Aurora), and Minneapolis ski clubs, but dissolved after an economic downturn and a couple low snow winters.

=== 1905 National Ski Association ===
The National Ski Association of America, the forerunner of the present-day U.S. Ski & Snowboard, was founded on February 21, 1905, in Ishpeming, Michigan. Club President Carl Tellefsen proposed holding a meeting after the 1905 jumping tournament – a national competition – to found a ski association which, among other duties, would oversee jumping tournaments. In 1905, the association was formally organized during a meeting attended by officers from the Ishpeming, Minneapolis, Red Wing, Stillwater and Eau Claire ski clubs. On February 21, 1905, Carl Tellefsen announced the National Ski Association of America with himself as its first president.

=== 1910 International Ski Commission ===
In 1910, the International Ski Commission was formed at the first International Ski Congress to develop rules for international ski competitions. On February 2, 1924, in Chamonix, France, while what would come to be recognized as the first Winter Olympic Games were being held, the commission gave way to the International Ski Federation (FIS); 14 member nations were present at the founding; 108 are FIS members today.

=== 1924 inaugural Winter Olympic Games at Chamonix, France ===
The first Winter Olympic Games actually were under the banner of International Sports Week, but were renamed the Winter Olympic Games in 1924 after organizers saw how successful they were (and after Norway, which had opposed "Winter Olympic" events because of concern Norwegians wouldn't dominate, saw it would be a winter power) supported the concept. Only Nordic skiing events were held, including cross country, ski jumping (then the premier ski event everywhere) and Nordic combined. Sixteen nations competed.

Anders Haugen, a Norwegian immigrant to the United States, was listed as fourth in ski jumping because of a calculation error. In 1974, as Norwegians prepared to celebrate the 50th anniversary of those first Winter Games, a recalculation in Oslo found Haugen was the real bronze medalist and not Thorleif Haug (1894–1934). A medal presentation was arranged in Oslo, where a frail Haugen received the bronze medal from the daughter of Thorleif Haug, who had been dead since the Thirties. Haugen's medal remains the only jumping medal won by an American in the Olympics or World Championships. Originally, the IOC did not recognize the medal exchange and kept Haug listed as its 1924 bronze medalist for years before recognizing Haugen as the legitimate medal-winner.

=== First FIS World Championships: Nordic (1925) and alpine (1931) ===
International competitive skiing was still primarily a European sport in the Twenties. Although the United States participated in the Winter Olympics of 1924, '28 and '32 - where there were only Nordic events, there was no U.S. Ski Team.

=== 1932 Winter Olympic Games at Lake Placid, New York ===
The 1932 Summer Games were headed to Los Angeles, and Godfrey Dewey – whose father had founded the Lake Placid Club – championed Lake Placid over a half-dozen other candidates for the Winter Games (including Denver; Minneapolis and Duluth, Minnesota; Yosemite and Lake Tahoe, California; and Bear Mountain, New York). Then-Gov. Franklin D. Roosevelt pledged to build a bobsled run and Dewey, who had arranged a posting as manager of the 1928 Olympic Ski Team, parlayed those contacts to land the 1932 Winter Olympics for the small Adirondacks village. Some 300 athletes from 17 nations competed. Skiing was still limited to Nordic events; top US skier was another jumper, Casper Oimoen, who finished fifth.

*** This was the first major international ski event in the United States

=== 1935 U.S. sends first alpine team to FIS World Championships ===
The championships returned to Mürren, Switzerland, site of the first official alpine championships in 1931. Six men, seven women were on that first U.S. squad at Worlds.

=== 1936 Alpine added to Winter Olympic Games at Garmisch-Partenkirchen, Germany ===
Alpine skiing was introduced to the Olympics with a single event, the combined (one downhill run and two slalom runs). While Nordic remained an all-male province, alpine was opened to men and women. Germans took gold and silver in both the men's and women's alpine combined events; Franz Pfnür and Christl Cranz were the new champions; Dick Durrance, who grew up in Florida but spent several years in Germany learning to ski before Adolf Hitler took power, was the runaway best U.S. skier, finishing 10th.

For the only time, the FIS authorized a World Championships in addition to the Olympics with alpine championship races held in Innsbruck, Austria.

=== 1948 Olympics return with first U.S. alpine medals at St. Moritz, Switzerland ===
The Olympics (with Germany and Japan barred from competing) returned after a 12-year hiatus, with American Gretchen Fraser (then of Vancouver, WA, later of Sun Valley, ID) winning the first two U.S. Olympic ski medals – and they came on the same day, Feb. 5; the combined downhill had been run the previous day and when she won the slalom, it gave her second place in the combined calculation. In addition to the combined, which debuted in 1936, alpine added both elements of combined as individual events, meaning alpine was now equal with Nordic, having three events (slalom, downhill and the combined; however, there were no women's Nordic events until 1952).

Fraser led U.S. skiers, collecting the first medals by a U.S. skier - gold in slalom and silver in combined. The U.S. women's team captain, Dodie Post, broke her ankle in a practice session and was unable to compete. The team also included a talented young teen – Andrea Mead, 15, whose parents owned Pico Peak, near Rutland, VT. Also of note, Gordon Wren (Steamboat Springs, CO) qualified for all four individual ski teams. He eventually competed only in jumping. "I was going ragged, bumping into myself, trying to train, ski alpine, cross country and the rest, so I decided to focus on jumping," he explained. He finished fifth.

=== 1950 World Championships in U.S.: Lake Placid, NY (Nordic) and Aspen, CO (alpine) ===
Poor snow in the Adirondacks almost forced cancellation of the Nordic events, but, alerted by 1948 Olympic cross country racer Chummy Broomhall that there was more than a foot of snow in his hometown of Rumford, Maine, officials agreed to stage opening ceremonies and the jumping events in Lake Placid, then everyone drove to Rumford for the cross country competitions. At one point, Broomhall helped set the race tracks – no machine-setting equipment in those days, so skiers would ski-in the tracks – and then went home to change into his racing outfit; traffic at the site meant Broomhall missed his scheduled start time, but officials let him run at the end of the pack.

The alpine Worlds, organized by Dick Durrance, then general manager at the fledgling Aspen Ski Area, included slalom, downhill, and the first appearance of giant slalom. American Katy Rodolph of Colorado led the US, finishing fifth in the women's downhill. Aspen was established as an alpine destination as a result of the successful World Championships.

=== 1960 Olympics return to U.S. at Olympic Valley, CA ===
The young Squaw Valley resort near Lake Tahoe in California ushered in a new Olympic era under the direction of Alexander Cushing. No bobsled run was built. In cross country, Squaw Valley introduced the initial machine-set tracks; everything had been walked or skied in before Squaw Valley but – with Al Merrill and Chummy Broomhall setting the tone as chief of competition and chief of course, respectively – snow machines were used to help groom Nordic courses for the first time.

=== 1962 NSA renamed U.S. Ski Association (USSA) ===
The 57-year-old National Ski Association got a new name as the U.S. Ski Association. The renamed organization moved from Denver to Colorado Springs, Colorado.

Also, the U.S. Ski Education Foundation, designed to "Establish, administer and promote educational programs devoted to the development and training of skiers" and promote ski museums, was founded October 8, 1862 (and chartered June 13, 1964). By enabling donors to receive tax deductions for contributions, it would become the fundraising arm of the U.S. Ski Team, the forerunner of the U.S. Ski and Snowboard Team Foundation.

=== 1964 U.S. alpine men earn first Olympic medals at Innsbruck, Austria ===
The Olympics came to Austria for the first time in 1964. U.S. men earned their first medals Feb 8 as Billy Kidd (Stowe, VT) won silver in slalom and Jimmie Heuga (Tahoe City, CA) took slalom bronze. Jean Saubert (Hillsborough, OR) was a double medalist, tying for silver in giant slalom and collecting bronze in slalom.

=== 1965 Bob Beattie named U.S. Ski Team alpine head coach ===
In 1965, the USSA took the first steps in the formation of a formal U.S. Ski Team by naming its first head alpine coach. At the annual USSA convention on June 21 in Spokane, Bob Beattie was named the first full-time U.S. alpine skiing head coach. "When you think you're going too fast--accelerate!" he would goad team members. Chuck Ferries, a 1964 Olympian, was named assistant coach, with primary responsibilities as head coach of the women's alpine team. Ferries took leave from his job with Head Ski Co. to coach, and was named full-time women's coach in 1966. No full-time Nordic jumping or skiing coaches were yet designated.

=== 1973 National Training Centers created ===
National Training Centers were created for both national alpine and Nordic teams. It was opened Oct 28 in three old, mid-mountain, mining buildings at Park City Ski Area (now Park City Mountain Resort). Former Alpine Director Willy Schaeffler was the center's director.

=== 1974 U.S. Ski Team moves to Park City, UT ===
In the summer of 1974 the alpine portion of the U.S. Ski Team relocated from USSA's Denver office to Park City, Utah. The athletes and coaches began utilizing the Alpine Training Center, a building designed by Willy Schaeffler, that opened in old mining buildings at Park City Ski Area. Administrative offices were set up in the old Mountain Air Grocery on lower Main Street.

=== 1976 USSA and U.S. Ski Team split ===
In 1976 the USSA and the U.S. Ski Team agreed to part ways. The USSA continued to control the rules and governance of the sport, as well as organizing travel programs for recreational skiers, while the U.S. Ski Team focused solely on the elite national team.

=== 1988 USSA and U.S. Ski Team rejoin ===
After years of operating separately, the USSA and U.S. Ski Team were merged once again in the Summer of 1998 under the direction of Thomas Weisel. Weisel proposed the creation of a 'super-board' consisting of 15 people representing the leadership of both organizations. USSA CEO Howard Peterson was selected to lead the new organization and the USSA moved its national offices from Colorado Springs to join the U.S. Ski Team in Park City, UT, establishing its headquarters at its present location on 1500 Kearns Blvd.

=== 2007 Center of Excellence groundbreaking ===
The USSA broke ground on the Center of Excellence on July 18, 2007. Upon opening in 2009, the Center of Excellence housed athletic facilities including strength-training areas, a gymnasium, a climbing wall, ski and snowboard ramps, trampolines, a nutrition center and rehabilitation facilities. Additionally, educational areas for athletes, coaches and clubs such as a computer lab, multimedia rooms for performance analysis and equipment workshops are available. All of the educational resources are shared with the USSA's 400 clubs around the country.

== Admission ==

Interested young athletes generally begin competing through one of 425 local U.S. Ski and Snowboard Association clubs located in communities around the country, generally at ski and snowboard resorts. Clubs provide introductory education and training, as well as competition programs.

Each U.S. Ski Team sport is also organized at a regional and divisional level, with slight variances by sport. Alpine skiing, for example, is organized in three regions: Eastern, Rocky/Central and Western. Within those regions are divisions including Northern, Eastern, Southern, Central, Rocky Mountain, Intermountain, Far West and Alaska. In some areas, such as New England, there are also state-based organizations.

Competition programs are held within each region or division leading up to national and international events. From these competitions, athletes earn points and are ranked nationally with the highest ranking athletes earning nominations to join the US national teams, which compete at the World Cup level.

Ski & snowboard is one of the only Olympic sports in the United States to support a full-time standing national team in every sport. Teams are nominated each spring or summer based on results. Teams for FIS World Championships (held every odd year) and Olympic Winter Games (held every four years) are selected by specific criteria and named for those individual events.

== Alpine highlights ==
=== Winter Olympic Games ===
Year	Location	Athletes	Medals
1948	St. Moritz, Switzerland	Gretchen Fraser	Gold, slalom; silver, combined
1952	Oslo, Norway	Andrea Mead Lawrence	Gold, slalom; gold, giant slalom
1960	(United States) Squaw Valley, California, USA	Penny Pitou; Betsy Snite	Silver, downhill; silver, giant slalom Silver, slalom
1964	Innsbruck, Austria	Jimmy Heuga; Billy Kidd; Jean Saubert	Bronze, slalom Silver, slalom; bronze, combined Silver, giant slalom (tie); bronze, slalom
1972	Sapporo, Japan	Barbara Cochran; Susie Corrock	Gold, slalom Bronze, downhill
1976	Innsbruck, Austria	Greg Jones; Cindy Nelson	Bronze, combined Bronze, downhill
1980	(United States) Lake Placid, New York, USA	Phil Mahre; Cindy Nelson	Gold, combined (unofficial Olympic event); silver, slalom Silver, combined
1984	(Socialist Federal Republic of Yugoslavia) Sarajevo, Yugoslavia	Debbie Armstrong; Christin Cooper; Bill Johnson; Phil Mahre; Steve Mahre	Gold, giant slalom Silver, giant slalom Gold, downhill Gold, slalom Silver, slalom
1992	Albertville, France	Hilary Lindh; Diann Roffe	Silver, downhill Silver, giant slalom
1994	Lillehammer, Norway	Tommy Moe; Diann Roffe-Steinrotter; Picabo Street	Gold, downhill; silver, super G Gold, super G Silver, downhill
1998	Nagano, Japan	Picabo Street	Gold, super G
2002	(United States) Salt Lake City, Utah, USA	Bode Miller	Silver, combined; silver, giant slalom
2006	Torino, Italy	Julia Mancuso; Ted Ligety	Gold, giant slalom Gold, combined
2010	Vancouver, Canada	Lindsey Vonn; Julia Mancuso; Bode Miller; Andrew Weibrecht	Gold, downhill; bronze, super-G; Silver, downhill; silver, super combined Gold, super combined; Silver, super G; bronze, downhill Bronze, super-G
2014	Sochi, Russia	Mikaela Shiffrin; Ted Ligety; Andrew Weibrecht; Bode Miller; Julia Mancuso	Gold, slalom Gold, giant slalom Silver, super G Bronze, super G; Bronze, super-G
2018	Pyeongchang, South Korea	Mikaela Shiffrin; Lindsey Vonn	Gold, giant slalom; Silver, super combined Bronze, downhill
2022	Beijing, China	Ryan Cochran-Siegle	Silver, super G
2026	Milan and Cortina d'Ampezzo, Italy	Breezy Johnson; Ryan Cochran-Siegle; Paula Moltzan; Jacqueline Wiles; Mikaela Shiffrin	Gold, downhill Silver, super G Bronze, team combined Bronze, team combined Gold, slalom

=== Alpine World Championships ===
Year	Location	Athletes	Medals
1954	Åre, Sweden	Jannette Burr	Bronze, giant slalom
1958	Bad Gastein, Austria	Sally Deaver	Silver, giant slalom
1962	Chamonix, France	Barbara Ferries; Joan Hannah	Bronze, downhill Bronze, giant slalom
1966	Portillo, Chile	Penny McCoy	Bronze, slalom
1970	Val Gardena, Italy	Billy Kidd; Barbara Cochran; Marilyn Cochran	Gold, combined; Bronze, slalom Silver, slalom Bronze, combined
1978	Garmisch-Partenkirchen, West Germany	Pete Patterson	Bronze, combined
1982	Schladming, Austria	Christin Cooper; Steve Mahre; Cindy Nelson	Silver, slalom; Silver, giant slalom; Bronze, combined Gold, giant slalom Silver, downhill
1985	Bormio, Italy	Doug Lewis; Diann Roffe; Tamara McKinney; Eva Twardokens	Bronze, downhill Gold, giant slalom Bronze, giant slalom Bronze, combined
1987	Crans-Montana, Switzerland	Tamara McKinney	Bronze, combined
1989	(United States) Vail, Colorado, USA	Tamara McKinney	Gold, combined; Bronze, slalom
1993	Morioka, Japan	AJ Kitt; Julie Parisien; Picabo Street	Bronze, downhill Silver, slalom Silver, combined
1996	Sierra Nevada, Spain	Hilary Lindh; Picabo Street	Bronze, downhill Gold, downhill; Bronze, super G
1997	Sestriere, Italy	Hilary Lindh	Gold, downhill
2001	St. Anton, Austria	Daron Rahlves	Gold, super G
2003	St. Moritz, Switzerland	Kirsten Clark; Jonna Mendes; Bode Miller; Erik Schlopy	Silver, super G Bronze, super G Gold, giant slalom; Gold, combined; Silver, super G Bronze, giant slalom
2005	Bormio/Santa Caterina, Italy	Julia Mancuso; Bode Miller; Daron Rahlves	Bronze, super G; Bronze, giant slalom Gold, downhill; Gold, super G Silver, downhill; Bronze, giant slalom
2007	Åre, Sweden	Lindsey Kildow; Julia Mancuso	Silver, downhill; Silver, super G Silver, super combined
2009	Val d'Isère, France	Lindsey Vonn; Ted Ligety	Gold, downhill; Gold, super G Bronze, giant slalom
2011	Garmisch-Partenkirchen, Germany	Lindsey Vonn; Ted Ligety; Julia Mancuso	Silver, downhill Gold, giant slalom Silver, super G
2013	Schladming, Austria	Mikaela Shiffrin; Ted Ligety; Julia Mancuso	Gold, slalom Gold, giant slalom; Gold, super combined; Gold, super G Bronze, super G
2015	(United States) Vail/Beaver Creek, Colorado, USA	Mikaela Shiffrin; Ted Ligety; Travis Ganong; Lindsey Vonn	Gold, slalom Gold, giant slalom; Bronze, super combined Silver, downhill Bronze, super G
2017	Sankt Moritz, Switzerland	Mikaela Shiffrin; Lindsey Vonn	Gold, slalom; Silver, giant slalom Bronze, downhill
2019	Åre, Sweden	Mikaela Shiffrin; Lindsey Vonn	Gold, slalom; Gold, super G; Bronze, giant slalom Bronze, downhill
2021	Cortina d'Ampezzo, Italy	Mikaela Shiffrin	Gold, combined; Silver, giant slalom; Bronze, slalom; Bronze, super G
2023	Courchevel and Méribel, France	Mikaela Shiffrin; Tommy Ford, Katie Hensien, Paula Moltzan, Nina O'Brien, River Radamus, Luke Winters	Gold, giant slalom; Silver, slalom; Silver, super G Gold, team parallel event
2025	Saalbach-Hinterglemm, Austria	Lauren Macuga; Breezy Johnson; Mikaela Shiffrin; Paula Moltzan	Bronze, super G Gold, downhill; Gold, team combined Gold, team combined Bronze, giant slalom

=== Alpine World Cup ===
Year	Athletes	Titles
1969	Marilyn Cochran	Giant slalom champion
1978	Phil Mahre	2nd in overall
1979	Phil Mahre	3rd in overall
1980	Phil Mahre	3rd in overall
1981	Phil Mahre; Tamara McKinney	Overall champion Giant slalom champion
1982	Christin Cooper; Phil Mahre; Steve Mahre	3rd in overall Overall, slalom, & giant slalom champion 3rd in overall
1983	Tamara McKinney; Phil Mahre	Overall & giant slalom champion Overall & giant slalom champion
1984	Tamara McKinney	3rd in overall, slalom champion
1995	Picabo Street	Downhill champion
1996	Picabo Street	Downhill champion
2003	Bode Miller	Combined champion, 2nd in overall
2004	Bode Miller	Giant slalom & combined champion
2005	Bode Miller	Overall & super-G champion
2006	Bode Miller	3rd in overall
2007	Julia Mancuso; Bode Miller	3rd in overall Super G champion
2008	Lindsey Vonn; Ted Ligety; Bode Miller	Overall & downhill champion Giant slalom champion Overall & super combined champion
2009	Lindsey Vonn	Overall, downhill, & super G champion
2010	Lindsey Vonn; Ted Ligety	Overall, downhill, super G & combined champion Giant slalom champion
2011	Lindsey Vonn; Ted Ligety	Downhill, super G, & combined champion Giant slalom champion
2012	Lindsey Vonn	Overall, downhill, super G, & combined champion
2013	Lindsey Vonn; Ted Ligety; Mikaela Shiffrin	Downhill champion Giant slalom champion, 3rd in overall Slalom champion
2014	Ted Ligety; Mikaela Shiffrin	Giant slalom champion Slalom champion
2015	Mikaela Shiffrin; Lindsey Vonn	Slalom champion Downhill, & super G champion, 3rd in overall
2016	Lindsey Vonn	Downhill champion, 2nd in overall
2017	Mikaela Shiffrin	Overall & slalom champion
2018	Mikaela Shiffrin	Overall & slalom champion
2019	Mikaela Shiffrin	Overall, super-G, giant slalom & slalom champion
2020	Mikaela Shiffrin	2nd in overall
2022	Mikaela Shiffrin	Overall champion
2023	Mikaela Shiffrin	Overall, giant slalom & slalom champion
2024	Mikaela Shiffrin	Slalom champion, 3rd in overall
2026	Mikaela Shiffrin	Overall & slalom champion
2026	Nations Cup Women champion	

=== Alpine National Championship ===
United States Alpine Ski Championships

== Freestyle highlights ==
=== Winter Olympic Games ===
Event	Place	Athlete	Highlights
1988 Olympic Games (non-medal exhibition event)	Calgary, Canada	Melanie Palenik	Gold Aerials (demonstration event)
1988 Olympic Games (non-medal exhibition event)	Calgary, Canada	Jan Bucher	Silver Ballet (demonstration event)
1988 Olympic Games (non-medal exhibition event)	Calgary, Canada	Lane Spina	Silver Ballet (demonstration event)
1992 Olympic Games	Albertville, France	Donna Weinbrecht	Gold Moguls
1992 Olympic Games	Albertville, France	Nelson Carmichael	Bronze Moguls
1992 Olympic Games	Albertville, France	Lane Spina	Bronze Ballet (demonstration event)
1992 Olympic Games	Albertville, France	Sharon Petzold	Bronze Ballet (demonstration event)
1994 Olympic Games	Lillehammer, Norway	Liz McIntyre	Silver Moguls
1998 Olympic Games	Nagano, Japan	Eric Bergoust	Gold Aerials
1998 Olympic Games	Nagano, Japan	Nikki Stone	Gold Aerials
1998 Olympic Games	Nagano, Japan	Jonny Moseley	Gold Moguls
2002 Olympic Games	(United States) Salt Lake City, Utah	Joe Pack	Silver Aerials
2002 Olympic Games	(United States) Salt Lake City, Utah	Travis Mayer	Silver Moguls
2002 Olympic Games	(United States) Salt Lake City, Utah	Shannon Bahrke	Silver Moguls
2006 Olympic Games	Torino, Italy	Toby Dawson	Bronze Moguls
2010 Olympic Games	Vancouver, Canada	Hannah Kearney	Gold Moguls
2010 Olympic Games	Vancouver, Canada	Bryon Wilson	Bronze Moguls
2010 Olympic Games	Vancouver, Canada	Shannon Bahrke	Bronze Moguls
2014 Olympic Games	Sochi, Russia	David Wise	Gold Halfpipe
2014 Olympic Games	Sochi, Russia	Maddie Bowman	Gold Halfpipe
2014 Olympic Games	Sochi, Russia	Joss Christensen	Gold Slopestyle
2014 Olympic Games	Sochi, Russia	Gus Kenworthy	Silver Slopestyle
2014 Olympic Games	Sochi, Russia	Devin Logan	Silver Slopestyle
2014 Olympic Games	Sochi, Russia	Nick Goepper	Bronze Slopestyle
2014 Olympic Games	Sochi, Russia	Hannah Kearney	Bronze Moguls
2026 Olympic Games	Milan and Cortina d'Ampezzo, Italy	Elizabeth Lemley	Gold Moguls, Bronze Dual Moguls
2026 Olympic Games	Milan and Cortina d'Ampezzo, Italy	Alex Hall	Silver Slopestyle
2026 Olympic Games	Milan and Cortina d'Ampezzo, Italy	Jaelin Kauf	Silver Moguls, Silver Dual Moguls
2026 Olympic Games	Milan and Cortina d'Ampezzo, Italy	Mac Forehand	Silver Big Air
2026 Olympic Games	Milan and Cortina d'Ampezzo, Italy	Alex Ferreira	Gold Halfpipe
2026 Olympic Games	Milan and Cortina d'Ampezzo, Italy	Connor Curran; Kaila Kuhn; Christopher Lillis	Gold Team Aerials

=== World freestyle championships ===
Event	Place	Athlete	Highlights
1986 World Championships	Tignes, France	Mary Jo Tiampo	Gold Moguls
1986 World Championships	Tignes, France	Maria Quintana	Gold Aerials
1986 World Championships	Tignes, France	Jan Bucher	Gold Ballet
1986 World Championships	Tignes, France	Lane Spina	Silver - Acrobatic Skiing
1986 World Championships	Tignes, France	John Witt	Silver Combined
1986 World Championships	Tignes, France	Hayley Wolff	Silver Moguls
1989 World Championships	Oberjoch, West Germany	Jan Bucher	Gold Ballet
1989 World Championships	Oberjoch, West Germany	Melanie Palenik	Gold Combined, Bronze Aerials
1989 World Championships	Oberjoch, West Germany	Scott Ogren	Silver Combined
1989 World Championships	Oberjoch, West Germany	Donna Weinbrecht	Silver Moguls
1991 World Championships	(United States) Lake Placid, New York	Lane Spina	Gold - Acrobatic Skiing
1991 World Championships	(United States) Lake Placid, New York	Ellen Breen	Gold Ballet
1991 World Championships	(United States) Lake Placid, New York	Donna Weinbrecht	Gold Moguls
1991 World Championships	(United States) Lake Placid, New York	Jan Bucher	Silver Ballet
1991 World Championships	(United States) Lake Placid, New York	Chuck Martin	Bronze Moguls
1991 World Championships	(United States) Lake Placid, New York	Dave Valenti	Bronze Aerials
1991 World Championships	(United States) Lake Placid, New York	Kriste Porter	Bronze Combined
1993 World Championships	Altenmarkt, Austria	Ellen Breen	Gold Ballet
1993 World Championships	Altenmarkt, Austria	Trace Worthington	Silver Aerials
1993 World Championships	Altenmarkt, Austria	Lane Spina	Bronze - Acrobatic Skiing
1993 World Championships	Altenmarkt, Austria	Kriste Porter	Bronze Aerials, Bronze Combined
1995 World Championships	LaClusaz, France	Trace Worthington	Gold Aerials, Gold Combined
1995 World Championships	LaClusaz, France	Nikki Stone	Gold Aerials
1995 World Championships	LaClusaz, France	Kriste Porter	Gold Combined
1995 World Championships	LaClusaz, France	Ellen Breen	Silver Ballet
1995 World Championships	LaClusaz, France	Jonny Moseley	Bronze Combined
1997 World Championships	Nagano, Japan	Eric Bergoust	Silver Aerials
1997 World Championships	Nagano, Japan	Ian Edmondson	Silver Acro
1997 World Championships	Nagano, Japan	Donna Weinbrecht	Silver Moguls
1999 World Championships	Meiringen, Switzerland	Ann Battelle	Gold Moguls, Bronze Dual Moguls
1999 World Championships	Meiringen, Switzerland	Ian Edmondson	Gold Acro
1999 World Championships	Meiringen, Switzerland	Eric Bergoust	Gold Aerials
1999 World Championships	Meiringen, Switzerland	Joe Pack	Bronze Aerials
1999 World Championships	Meiringen, Switzerland	Nikki Stone	Bronze Aerials
2001 World Championships	Whistler, Canada	Joe Pack	Bronze Aerials
2003 World Championships	(United States) Deer Valley, Utah	Jeremy Bloom	Gold Dual Moguls, Silver Moguls
2003 World Championships	(United States) Deer Valley, Utah	Michelle Roark	Silver Moguls
2003 World Championships	(United States) Deer Valley, Utah	Toby Dawson	Bronze Moguls, Bronze Dual Moguls
2003 World Championships	(United States) Deer Valley, Utah	Shannon Bahrke	Bronze Dual Moguls
2005 World Championships	Ruka, Finland	Nate Roberts	Gold Moguls
2005 World Championships	Ruka, Finland	Hannah Kearney	Gold Moguls
2005 World Championships	Ruka, Finland	Toby Dawson	Gold Dual Moguls
2005 World Championships	Ruka, Finland	Kristi Leskinen	Silver Halfpipe
2005 World Championships	Ruka, Finland	Jeremy Bloom	Bronze Dual Moguls
2007 World Championships	Madonna di Campiglio, Italy	Shannon Bahrke	Silver Dual Moguls
2007 World Championships	Madonna di Campiglio, Italy	Nate Roberts	Bronze Moguls
2009 World Championships	Inawashiro, Japan	Patrick Deneen	Gold Moguls
2009 World Championships	Inawashiro, Japan	Ryan St Onge	Gold Aerials
2009 World Championships	Inawashiro, Japan	Jen Hudak	Bronze Halfpipe
2009 World Championships	Inawashiro, Japan	Hannah Kearney	Bronze Dual Moguls
2011 World Championships	(United States) Park City, Utah	Alex Schlopy	Gold Slopestyle
2011 World Championships	(United States) Park City, Utah	Hannah Kearney	Silver Moguls, Bronze Dual Moguls
2011 World Championships	(United States) Park City, Utah	Jen Hudak	Silver Halfpipe
2011 World Championships	(United States) Park City, Utah	Sam Carlson	Silver Slopestyle
2011 World Championships	(United States) Park City, Utah	Simon Dumont	Bronze Halfpipe
2011 World Championships	(United States) Park City, Utah	Keri Herman	Bronze Slopestyle
2013 World Championships	Voss, Norway	Hannah Kearney	Gold Moguls, Bronze Dual Moguls
2013 World Championships	Voss, Norway	David Wise	Gold Halfpipe
2013 World Championships	Voss, Norway	Tom Wallisch	Gold Slopestyle
2013 World Championships	Voss, Norway	Torin Yater-Wallace	Silver Halfpipe
2013 World Championships	Voss, Norway	Patrick Deneen	Bronze Moguls, Bronze Dual Moguls
2013 World Championships	Voss, Norway	Nick Goepper	Bronze Slopestyle
2013 World Championships	Voss, Norway	Grete Eliassen	Bronze Slopestyle
2013 World Championships	Voss, Norway	John Teller	Bronze Ski Cross
2015 World Championships	(Austria) Kreischberg	Hannah Kearney	Silver Moguls
2015 World Championships	(Austria) Kreischberg	Hannah Kearney	Gold Dual Moguls
2015 World Championships	(Austria) Kreischberg	Alex Bowen	Silver Aerials
2015 World Championships	(Austria) Kreischberg	Kiley McKinnon	Silver Aerials
2017 World Championships	(Spain) Sierra Nevada	Jonathon Lillis	Gold Aerials
2017 World Championships	(Spain) Sierra Nevada	Ashley Caldwell	Gold Aerials
2017 World Championships	(Spain) Sierra Nevada	Bradley Wilson	Silver Dual Moguls
2017 World Championships	(Spain) Sierra Nevada	Jaelin Kauf	Bronze Dual Moguls
2019 World Championships	(United States) Utah	Julia Krass	Silver Big Air
2019 World Championships	(United States) Utah	Nick Goepper	Bronze Slopestyle
2019 World Championships	(United States) Utah	Aaron Blunck	Gold Halfpipe
2019 World Championships	(United States) Utah	Brita Sigourney	Bronze Halfpipe
2019 World Championships	(United States) Utah	Bradley Wilson	Silver Dual Moguls
2019 World Championships	(United States) Utah	Jaelin Kauf	Silver Dual Moguls
2019 World Championships	(United States) Utah	Tess Johnson	Bronze Dual Moguls
2021 World Championships	(Sweden) Idre (Kazakhstan) Almaty (United States) Aspen	Christopher Lillis	Silver Aerials, Bronze Team Aerials
2021 World Championships	(Sweden) Idre (Kazakhstan) Almaty (United States) Aspen	Ashley Caldwell	Silver Aerials, Bronze Team Aerials
2021 World Championships	(Sweden) Idre (Kazakhstan) Almaty (United States) Aspen	Eric Loughran	Bronze Team Aerials
2021 World Championships	(Sweden) Idre (Kazakhstan) Almaty (United States) Aspen	Birk Irving	Bronze Halfpipe
2021 World Championships	(Sweden) Idre (Kazakhstan) Almaty (United States) Aspen	Colby Stevenson	Silver Slopestyle
2021 World Championships	(Sweden) Idre (Kazakhstan) Almaty (United States) Aspen	Alex Hall	Bronze Slopestyle
2023 World Championships	(Georgia (country)) Bakuriani	Ashley Caldwell	Gold Team Aerials
2023 World Championships	(Georgia (country)) Bakuriani	Christopher Lillis	Gold Team Aerials
2023 World Championships	(Georgia (country)) Bakuriani	Quinn Dehlinger	Gold Team Aerials, Silver Aerials
2023 World Championships	(Georgia (country)) Bakuriani	Jaelin Kauf	Silver Moguls, Silver Dual Moguls
2023 World Championships	(Georgia (country)) Bakuriani	Alex Ferreira	Bronze Halfpipe
2023 World Championships	(Georgia (country)) Bakuriani	Hanna Faulhaber	Gold Halfpipe
2023 World Championships	(Georgia (country)) Bakuriani	Troy Podmilsak	Gold Big Air
2025 World Championships	(Switzerland) Engadin	Jaelin Kauf	Gold Dual Moguls
2025 World Championships	(Switzerland) Engadin	Tess Johnson	Silver Dual Moguls
2025 World Championships	(Switzerland) Engadin	Mac Forehand	Silver Slopestyle
2025 World Championships	(Switzerland) Engadin	Alex Hall	Bronze Slopestyle
2025 World Championships	(Switzerland) Engadin	Kaila Kuhn	Gold Team Aerials, Gold Aerials
2025 World Championships	(Switzerland) Engadin	Quinn Dehlinger	Gold Team Aerials, Silver Aerials
2025 World Championships	(Switzerland) Engadin	Christopher Lillis	Gold Team Aerials
2025 World Championships	(Switzerland) Engadin	Nick Goepper	Silver Halfpipe
2025 World Championships	(Switzerland) Engadin	Alex Ferreira	Bronze Halfpipe

=== Freestyle World Cup ===
Year	Athlete	Champion highlights
1978	Marion Post	Ballet Champion
1978	Kerri Ballard	Aerials Champion
1978	Genia Fuller	Grand Prix Champion
1979	Bob Howard	Ballet Champion
1979	Jan Bucher	Ballet Champion
1979	Lea Hillgren	Aerials Champion
1980	Bob Howard	Ballet Champion
1980	Jan Bucher	Ballet Champion
1980	Hayley Wolff	Moguls Champion
1981	Bob Howard	Ballet Champion
1981	Frank Beddor	Grand Prix Champion
1981	Jan Bucher	Ballet Champion
1981	Hayley Wolff	Moguls Champion
1982	Ian Edmondson	Ballet Champion
1982	Frank Beddor	Grand Prix Champion
1982	Jan Bucher	Ballet Champion
1982	Hayley Wolff	Moguls Champion
1983	Jan Bucher	Ballet Champion
1983	Hayley Wolff	Moguls Champion
1984	Jan Bucher	Ballet Champion
1984	Hilary Engisch	Moguls Champion
1985	Mary Jo Tiampo	Moguls Champion
1986	Steve Desovich	Moguls Champion
1986	Jan Bucher	Ballet Champion
1986	Mary Jo Tiampo	Moguls Champion
1988	Nelson Carmichael	Moguls Champion
1989	Nelson Carmichael	Moguls Champion
1989	Jan Bucher	Ballet Champion
1990	Donna Weinbrecht	Moguls Champion
1991	Donna Weinbrecht	Moguls Champion
1992	Trace Worthington	Combined Champion
1992	Donna Weinbrecht	Moguls Champion
1993	Trace Worthington	Combined Champion
1993	Ellen Breen	Ballet Champion
1994	Ellen Breen	Ballet Champion
1994	Donna Weinbrecht	Moguls Champion
1995	Trace Worthington	Aerials Champion, Combined Champion
1995	Ellen Breen	Ballet Champion
1995	Nikki Stone	Aerials Champion
1996	Jonny Moseley	Combined Champion
1996	Donna Weinbrecht	Moguls Champion
1998	Jonny Moseley	Moguls Champion
1998	Nikki Stone	Aerials Champion
1999	Anne Battelle	Moguls Champion
1999	Michelle Roark	Dual Moguls Champion
2000	Anne Battelle	Moguls Champion
2001	Eric Bergoust	Aerials Champion, 2nd overall standings
2001	Joe Pack	3rd overall standings
2002	Jeremy Bloom	Moguls Champion
2002	Eric Bergoust	Aerials Champion
2003	Travis Cabral	Moguls Champion
2003	Shannon Bahrke	Moguls Champion
2005	Jeremy Bloom	Overall Champion, Moguls Champion
2005	Jeret Peterson	Aerials Champion
2007	Jeret Peterson	3rd overall standings
2007	Jessica Cumming	Halfpipe Champion
2009	Hannah Kearney	Moguls Champion
2011	Hannah Kearney	Overall Champion, Moguls Champion
2012	Hannah Kearney	Overall Champion, Moguls Champion
2012	David Wise	Halfpipe Champion
2012	Brita Sigourney	Halfpipe Champion
2013	Hannah Kearney	Moguls Champion
2013	Keri Herman	Slopestyle Champion
2014	Hannah Kearney	Overall Champion, Moguls Champion
2014	Devin Logan	Halfpipe Champion
2014	Nations Cup Champion	
2015	Mac Bohonnon	Aerials Champion
2015	David Wise	Halfpipe Champion
2015	Hannah Kearney	Overall Champion, Moguls Champion
2015	Kiley McKinnon	Aerials Champion
2016	Devin Logan	Overall Champion
2016	Ashley Caldwell	Aerials Champion
2017	McRae Williams	Slopestyle Champion
2018	Alex Ferreira	Halfpipe Champion
2019	Mac Forehand	Slopestyle Champion
2020	Aaron Blunck	Halfpipe Champion
2021	Colby Stevenson	Park & Pipe overall Champion, Slopestyle Champion
2021	Aaron Blunck	Halfpipe Champion
2023	Birk Irving	Halfpipe Champion
2024	Alex Ferreira	Park & Pipe Overall Champion, Halfpipe Champion
2024	Mac Forehand	Slopestyle Champion
2024	Alexander Hall	Big Air Champion
2025	Alex Ferreira	Halfpipe Champion
2025	Jaelin Kauf	Overall Moguls Champion, Moguls Champion, Dual Moguls Champion
2025	Alex Hall	Slopestyle Champion
2025	Moguls Nations Cup Champion	
2026	Troy Podmilsak	Big Air Champion
2026	Olivia Giaccio	Overall Moguls Champion
2026	Jaelin Kauf	Dual Moguls Champion
2026	Moguls Nations Cup Champion, Dual Moguls Nations Cup Champion, Park & Pipe (HP/SS/BA) Nations Cup Champion	

== Cross-country highlights ==
=== Winter Olympic Games ===
Event	Place	Athlete	Highlights
1976 Olympic Games	Innsbruck, Austria	Bill Koch	Silver 30 km
2002 Olympic Games	(United States) Salt Lake City, Utah	John Bauer, Kris Freeman, Justin Wadsworth, Carl Swenson	5th 4x10km Relay – Historic best US Olympic relay finish
2006 Olympic Games	Turin, Italy	Kikkan Randall	9th 1.1 km Classic Sprint – Historic Best US Women's Olympic or World Championships Sprint Result
2018 Olympic Games	Pyeongchang, South Korea	Kikkan Randall, Jessie Diggins	Gold Team Sprint Relay – First Medal for US Women's Cross Country and First US Gold Medal in Cross Country
2026 Olympic Games	Milan and Cortina d'Ampezzo, Italy	Ben Ogden	Silver sprint
2026 Olympic Games	Milan and Cortina d'Ampezzo, Italy	Jessie Diggins	Bronze 10 km
2026 Olympic Games	Milan and Cortina d'Ampezzo, Italy	Ben Ogden, Gus Schumacher	Silver team sprint

=== World cross-country championships ===
Event	Place	Athlete	Highlights
1982 World Championships	Oslo, Norway	Bill Koch	Bronze 30 km
2003 Under-23 Championships	Valdidentro, Italy	Kris Freeman	Gold 30 km Classic
2003 World Championships	Lausanne, Switzerland	Kris Freeman	4th 15K Classic
2007 World Championships	Sapporo, Japan	Andy Newell	5th in Classic Sprint – Historic Best US Worlds Sprint Result
2009 World Championships	Liberec, Czech Republic	Kikkan Randall	Silver in Individual Sprint Freestyle – First ever medal for an American Woman
2013 World Championships	Val di Fiemme, Italy	Kikkan Randall and Jessie Diggins	Gold in Team Sprint – First ever gold medal for the USA
2015 World Championships	Falun, Sweden	Jessie Diggins and Caitlin Gregg	Silver and Bronze in 10K Free – First time two Americans made the podium in an individual race
2017 World Championships	Lahti, Finland	Sadie Bjornsen and Jessie Diggins	Silver in Sprint and Bronze in Team Sprint
2023 World Championships	Planica, Slovenia	Jessie Diggins and Julia Kern	Gold in 10K Freestyle and Bronze in Team Sprint
2025 World Championships	Trondheim, Norway	Jessie Diggins and Julia Kern	Silver in Team Sprint

=== Cross-country World Cup ===
Year	Athlete	Highlights
1976	Bill Koch	Tied for 3rd in World Cup Overall
1982	Bill Koch	Overall World Cup Champion
1983	Bill Koch	3rd in Overall World Cup
2006	Andy Newell	3rd in 1 km Freestyle Sprint in Changchun, China – First US Man on a World Cup Podium Since 1983
2007	Kikkan Randall	3rd in 1.2 km Sprint at Rybinsk, Russia (January 21, 2007) – First US Woman on a World Cup Podium
2012	Kikkan Randall	World Cup Sprint discipline title (first ever World Cup discipline title won by an American woman)
2013	Kikkan Randall	World Cup Sprint discipline title, 3rd in Overall World Cup
2014	Kikkan Randall	World Cup Sprint discipline title
2018	Jessie Diggins	2nd in Overall World Cup, 3rd in World Cup Distance discipline 3rd in Tour de Ski (Stage events)
2018	Sophie Caldwell	3rd in World Cup Sprint discipline
2021	Jessie Diggins	Overall World Cup Champion, World Cup Distance discipline title Tour de Ski title (Stage events)
2022	Jessie Diggins	2nd in Overall World Cup
2023	Jessie Diggins	2nd in Overall World Cup, 2nd in World Cup Distance discipline
2023	Ben Ogden	World Cup U23 title
2024	Jessie Diggins	Overall World Cup Champion, World Cup Distance discipline title Tour de Ski title (Stage events)
2024	Zanden McMullen	3rd in World Cup U23 discipline
2025	Jessie Diggins	Overall World Cup Champion, World Cup Distance discipline title 3rd in Tour de Ski (Stage events)
2026	Jessie Diggins	Overall World Cup Champion, World Cup Distance discipline title Tour de Ski title (Stage events)

== Nordic combined highlights ==
=== Winter Olympic Games ===
Event	Place	Athlete	Highlights
1932 Olympic Games	(United States) Lake Placid, New York	Rolf Monsen	9th in K100/10 km Individual – historic best US Olympic Nordic combined individual finish
2002 Olympic Games	(United States) Salt Lake City, Utah	Bill Demong, Matt Dayton, Johnny Spillane, Todd Lodwick	4th in K90/4x5 Team Relay – historic best US Olympic Nordic combined result
2010 Olympic Games	(Canada) Vancouver, British Columbia	Bill Demong	Gold in Individual Large Hill/10 km
2010 Olympic Games	(Canada) Vancouver, British Columbia	Johnny Spillane	Silver in individual large hill/10 km; silver in individual normal hill/10 km
2010 Olympic Games	(Canada) Vancouver, British Columbia	Brett Camerota, Todd Lodwick, Bill Demong, Johnny Spillane	Silver in team large hill/4 x 5 km

=== World Nordic combined championships ===
Event	Place	Athlete	Highlights
2003 World Championships	Val di Fiemme, Italy	Johnny Spillane	Gold K120/7.5 km Sprint – historic first US Nordic combined medal Olympics or Worlds
2007 World Championships	Sapporo, Japan	Bill Demong	Silver HS100/15 km individual
2009 World Championships	Liberec, Czech Republic	Todd Lodwick	Gold HS100/10 km mass start
2009 World Championships	Liberec, Czech Republic	Todd Lodwick	Gold HS100/10 km normal hill
2009 World Championships	Liberec, Czech Republic	Bill Demong	Bronze HS100/10 km normal hill
2009 World Championships	Liberec, Czech Republic	Bill Demong	Gold HS134/10 km large hill
2013 World Championships	Val di Fiemme, Italy	Bill Demong, Todd Lodwick, Taylor Fletcher, Bryan Fletcher	Bronze Team HS106/4x5km

=== Nordic combined World Cup ===
Year	Athlete	Highlights
2004	Todd Lodwick	1st in Warsteiner Grand Prix
2005	Todd Lodwick	3rd in World Cup Sprint, 3rd in Warsteiner Grand Prix
2008	Bill Demong	3rd in World Cup Overall
2009	Bill Demong	Repeats as 3rd in World Cup Overall
2021	Tara Geraghty-Moats	1st in World Cup Overall – Historic Best US Result; 1st in Best Skier Trophy
2021	2nd in Nations Cup	
2026	Alexa Brabec	2nd in World Cup Overall; 2nd in Best Jumper Trophy, 2nd in Compact Trophy, 2nd in Mass Start Trophy, 2nd in Nordic Combined Triple
2026	Tara Geraghty-Moats	3rd in Best Skier Trophy, 3rd in Nordic Combined Triple
2026	3rd in Nations Cup	

=== Nordic combined National Championship ===
United States Nordic Combined Championships

== Jumping highlights ==
=== Winter Olympic Games ===
Event	Place	Athlete	Highlights
1924 Olympic Games (doubled as World Championships)	Chamonix, France	Anders Haugen	Bronze Large Hill (medal not awarded until 1974 due to scoring error)

=== Ski jumping World Cup ===
Year	Athlete	Highlights
1981	John Broman	First U.S. World Cup victory – February 22, 1981, Thunder Bay, Ontario

=== Ski jumping National Championship ===
U.S. National Ski Jumping Championships
