= Dick Durrance =

American professional skier

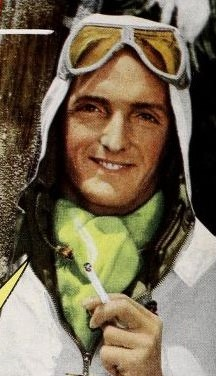
- Dick Durrance 1942 (smoking)

Personal information
- Born: October 23, 1914 Tarpon Springs, Florida, U.S.
- Died: June 13, 2004 (aged 89) Carbondale, Colorado, U.S.

Skiing career
- Sport: Alpine skiing ♂
- Club: Sun Valley; Dartmouth College
- Disciplines: Downhill, giant slalom, slalom, combined

Olympics
- Teams: 2 – (1936, 1940 (cancelled))
- Medals: 0

Richard Henry Durrance (October 23, 1914 – June 13, 2004) was a 17-time national championship alpine ski racer and one of the first Americans to compete successfully against Europeans.

Durrance was born in Tarpon Springs, Florida, and moved with his family at age 13 in 1928 to Munich, Germany, where he learned to ski at nearby Garmisch-Partenkirchen. Durrance raced competitively in Germany and won the German Junior Alpine Championship in 1932 at age 17. The following year, he learned the newly developed parallel turn from Anton Seelos.

With the rise of Hitler, the family returned to the United States and he attended Dartmouth College in 1934 and won at Sestriere, Italy, the first American to dominate at a major European ski race. Durrance also won the U.S. men's downhill, slalom, and combined events in 1937 and was named to the U.S. Olympic Team for the 1936 Winter Olympics, the first to include alpine skiing. The only medal event was the combined and Durrance finished tenth; eleventh in the downhill portion and eighth in the slalom. He was a three-time winner of the Harriman Cup in Sun Valley, Idaho, then held in the Boulder Mountains north of the resort, and helped cut the original trails on its Bald Mountain in the summer of 1939. Durrance was named to the 1940 Olympic team, but those games were cancelled due to World War II. In 1940, he worked as publicity photographer for Sun Valley and married ski racer Margaret "Miggs" Jennings.

In 1941, the Durrances bought and operated the lodge and lifts at fledgling Alta in Utah, near Salt Lake City. After training paratroopers to ski for the U.S. Army at Alta, the Durrances were expecting their first child. They moved to Seattle, where Dick worked for Boeing on in-flight camera recording equipment as a Flight Test Engineer, a job that lasted until 1945.

The Durrances then moved to Colorado to work in Denver for Thor Groswold, then the nation's premier ski maker, to design and test Groswold skis. At the same time, Durrance contracted with Denver's Ernest Constam, inventor of the J-bar and the T-bar ski lifts, to sell his conveyances in the West. Durrance sold his first T-bar to Aspen, a resort just then emerging as the first postwar ski area of note in the Rockies.

In 1947, Durrance was hired to manage the Aspen Skiing Company. The struggling company was turned around by Durrance, who brought the 1950 World Championships to Aspen, the first held outside of Europe. It put Aspen on the map and it is now one of the most popular ski resorts in the United States. He also produced a number of ski films and devoted most of his life to the promotion of skiing.

Durrance died of natural causes at age 89 on June 13, 2004, in Carbondale, Colorado, near Aspen. His wife Miggs died in November 2002; they were survived by their two sons, Dick, Jr. and Dave, and three grandchildren.

In its 75th anniversary issue in 2011, SKI magazine listed Durrance as the "Skier of the Decade" for the 1930s.

== Olympic results ==
Year	Age	Slalom	Giant Slalom	Super-G	Downhill	Combined
1936	21	not run				10
1940	25	cancelled due to World War II				
