= United States at the 1952 Winter Olympics =

- Flag of the United States
- IOC code: USA
- NOC: United States Olympic Committee

in Oslo, Norway February 14–25, 1952
- Competitors: 65 (55 men, 10 women) in 4 sports
- Flag bearer: James Bickford (bobsleigh)
- Medals Ranked 2nd: Gold 4 Silver 6 Bronze 1 Total 11

Winter Olympics appearances (overview)
- 1924; 1928; 1932; 1936; 1948; 1952; 1956; 1960; 1964; 1968; 1972; 1976; 1980; 1984; 1988; 1992; 1994; 1998; 2002; 2006; 2010; 2014; 2018; 2022; 2026

The United States competed at the 1952 Winter Olympics in Oslo, Norway.

== Medalists ==
The following U.S. competitors won medals at the games. In the by discipline sections below, medalists' names are bolded.

Medal	Name	Sport	Event	Date
Gold	Andrea Mead Lawrence	Alpine skiing	Women's giant slalom	February 14
Gold	Ken Henry	Speed skating	500 meters	February 16
Gold	Andrea Mead Lawrence	Alpine skiing	Women's slalom	February 20
Gold	Dick Button	Figure skating	Men's singles	February 21
Silver	Stanley Benham; Patrick Martin	Bobsleigh	Two-man	February 15
Silver	Don McDermott	Speed skating	500 meters	February 16
Silver	Tenley Albright	Figure skating	Women's singles	February 20
Silver	James Atkinson; Stanley Benham; Howard Crossett; Patrick Martin	Bobsleigh	Four-man	February 22
Silver	Karol Kennedy; Peter Kennedy	Figure skating	Pairs	February 22
Silver	United States men's national ice hockey team: Ruben Bjorkman; Len Ceglarski; Joseph Czarnota; Richard Desmond; Andre Gambucci; Clifford Harrison; Gerald Kilmartin; John Mulhern; John Noah; Arnold Oss; Robert Rompre; James Sedin; Allen Van; Donald Whiston; Ken Yackel	Ice hockey	Men's tournament	February 25
Bronze	James Grogan	Figure skating	Men's singles	February 21

Medals by sport
Sport	1st place, gold medalist(s)	2nd place, silver medalist(s)	3rd place, bronze medalist(s)	Total
Alpine skiing	2	0	0	**2**
Figure skating	1	2	1	**4**
Speed skating	1	1	0	**2**
Bobsleigh	0	2	0	**2**
Ice hockey	0	1	0	**1**
Total	4	6	1	11

Medals by gender
Gender	1st place, gold medalist(s)	2nd place, silver medalist(s)	3rd place, bronze medalist(s)	Total	Percentage
Male	2	4	1	**7**	63.6%
Female	2	1	0	**3**	27.3%
Mixed	0	1	0	**1**	9.1%
Total	4	6	1	11	100%

Multiple medalists
Name	Sport	1st place, gold medalist(s)	2nd place, silver medalist(s)	3rd place, bronze medalist(s)	Total
Andrea Mead Lawrence	Alpine skiing	2	0	0	**2**
Stanley Benham	Bobsleigh	0	2	0	**2**
Patrick Martin	Bobsleigh	0	2	0	**2**

== Alpine skiing ==
Men

Athlete	Event	Run 1		Run 2		Total	
Athlete	Event	Time	Rank	Time	Rank	Time	Rank
Bill Beck	Downhill	—N/a				2:33.3	5
Dick Buek	Downhill	—N/a				2:39.1	12
Brooks Dodge	Downhill	—N/a				2:52.2	32
Jack Reddish	Downhill	—N/a				2:41.5	14
Brooks Dodge	Giant slalom	—N/a				2:32.6	6
David Lawrence	Giant slalom	—N/a				2:48.6	35
Jack Nagel	Giant slalom	—N/a				2:42.0	29
Jack Reddish	Giant slalom	—N/a				2:39.5	24
Brooks Dodge	Slalom	1:01.4	8 Q	1:03.3	11	2:04.7	9
Jack Nagel	Slalom	1:07.3	35	did not advance			
Jack Reddish	Slalom	1:02.5	13 Q	1:06.5	23	2:09.0	17
Darrell Robison	Slalom	1:05.1	25 Q	1:05.1	18	2:10.2	22

Women

Athlete	Event	Run 1		Run 2		Total	
Athlete	Event	Time	Rank	Time	Rank	Time	Rank
Jannette Burr	Downhill	—N/a				DSQ	
Andrea Mead Lawrence	Downhill	—N/a				1:55.3	17
Katy Rodolph	Downhill	—N/a				1:57.4	23
Betty Weir	Downhill	—N/a				1:55.7	19
Jannette Burr	Giant slalom	—N/a				2:19.2	22
Andrea Mead Lawrence	Giant slalom	—N/a				2:06.8	1st place, gold medalist(s)
Imogene Opton	Giant slalom	—N/a				2:15.8	15
Katy Rodolph	Giant slalom	—N/a				2:11.7	5
Jannette Burr	Slalom	1:11.2	19	1:09.3	15	2:20.5	15
Andrea Mead Lawrence	Slalom	1:07.2	4	1:03.4	1	2:10.6	1st place, gold medalist(s)
Imogene Opton	Slalom	1:07.4	5	1:06.7	5	2:14.1	5
Katy Rodolph	Slalom	1:17.6	31	1:06.4	4	2:24.0	21

== Bobsleigh ==
Athlete	Event	Run 1		Run 2		Run 3		Run 4		Total	
Athlete	Event	Time	Rank	Time	Rank	Time	Rank	Time	Rank	Time	Rank
Stanley Benham; Patrick Martin	Two-man	1:22.03	2	1:22.12	2	1:21.21	2	1:21.53	3	5:26.89	2nd place, silver medalist(s)
Frederick Fortune; John L. Helmer	Two-man	1:23.46	7	1:24.48	8	1:23.15	7	1:22.73	5	5:33.82	7
Stanley Benham; Patrick Martin; Howard Crossett; James Atkinson	Four-man	1:17.44	2	1:17.78	2	1:16.72	2	1:18.54	4	5:10.48	2nd place, silver medalist(s)
James Bickford; Hubert Miller; Maurice R. Severino; Joseph Scott	Four-man	1:19.13	8	1:19.97	11	1:19.49	11	1:21.09	11	5:19.68	9

== Cross-country skiing ==
Athlete	Event	Time	Rank
Wendell Broomhall	Men's 18 km	1:14:06	57
John Burton	Men's 18 km	1:16:47	67
John Caldwell	Men's 18 km	1:25:42	73
Theodore A. Farwell	Men's 18 km	1:11:54	43
George Hovland	Men's 18 km	1:18:05	71
Tom Jacobs	Men's 18 km	1:16:43	66
Robert Pidacks	Men's 18 km	1:18:25	72
Wendell Broomhall; John C. Burton; Theodore A. Farwell; George Hovland	Men's 4 × 10 km relay	2:53:28	12

== Figure skating ==
Individual

Athlete	Event	CF	FS	Total		
Athlete	Event	Rank	Rank	Points	Places	Rank
Dick Button	Men's singles	1	1	192.256	9	1st place, gold medalist(s)
James Grogan	Men's singles	3	2	180.822	24	3rd place, bronze medalist(s)
Hayes Alan Jenkins	Men's singles	5	3	174.589	40	4
Tenley Albright	Ladies' singles	2	3	159.133	22	2nd place, silver medalist(s)
Virginia Baxter	Ladies' singles	8	1	152.211	50	5
Sonya Klopfer	Ladies' singles	3	5	154.633	33	4

Mixed

Athlete	Event	Points	Places	Rank
Janet Gerhauser; John Nightingale	Pairs	10.289	54	6
Karol Kennedy; Peter Kennedy	Pairs	11.178	17.5	2nd place, silver medalist(s)

== Ice hockey ==
The tournament was run in a round-robin format with nine teams participating.

Summary

Team	Event	Opposition Score	Opposition Score	Opposition Score	Opposition Score	Opposition Score	Opposition Score	Opposition Score	Opposition Score	Rank
United States men	Men's tournament	Norway; W 3–2	West Germany; W 8–2	Finland; W 8–2	Switzerland; W 8–2	Sweden; L 2–4	Poland; W 5–3	Czechoslovakia; W 6–3	Canada; T 3–3	2nd place, silver medalist(s)

Roster

Alfred Van Allen
André Gambucci
Arnold Oss
Clifford Harrison
Donald Whiston
Gerald Kilmartin
James Sedin
John Mulhern
John Noah
Joseph Czarnota
Kenneth Yackel
Len Ceglarski
Richard Desmond
Robert Rompre

Tournament

Team	Pld	W	L	T	GF	GA	Pts
Canada	8	7	0	1	71	14	15
United States	8	6	1	1	43	21	13
Sweden	9	7	2	0	53	22	14
Czechoslovakia	9	6	3	0	50	23	12
Switzerland	8	4	4	0	40	40	8
Poland	8	2	5	1	21	56	5
Finland	8	2	6	0	21	60	4
West Germany	8	1	6	1	21	53	3
Norway	8	0	8	0	15	46	0

- Norway 2-3 USA
- USA 8-2 Germany FR
- USA 8-2 Finland
- USA 8-2 Switzerland
- Sweden 4-2 USA
- USA 5-3 Poland
- USA 6-3 Czechoslovakia
- Canada 3-3 USA

== Nordic combined ==
The cross-country skiing part of this event was combined with the main medal event, meaning that athletes competing here were skiing for two disciplines at the same time. Details can be found above in this article, in the cross-country skiing section.

The ski jumping (normal hill) event was held separate from the main medal event of ski jumping, results can be found in the table below (athletes were allowed to perform three jumps, the best two jumps were counted and are shown here).

Athlete	Event	Ski Jumping				Cross-country			Total	
Athlete	Event	Jump 1	Jump 2	Total	Rank	Time	Points	Rank	Points	Rank
John Caldwell	Individual	57.5	58.0	146.5	25	1:25:42	155.273	22	301.773	22
Theodore Farwell	Individual	60.0	60.0	196.0	13	1:11:54	205.454	13	401.454	11
Tom Jacobs	Individual	57.0	56.0	179.5	21	1:16:43	187.939	19	367.439	21
Paul Wegeman	Individual	58.5	58.5	187.0	19	DNF				

== Ski jumping ==
Athlete	Event	Jump 1			Jump 2			Total	
Athlete	Event	Distance	Points	Rank	Distance	Points	Rank	Points	Rank
Art Devlin	Normal hill	63.5	104.0	13	60.5	97.5	23	201.5	15
Willis Olson	Normal hill	62.5	100.5	18	62.0	93.0	31	193.5	22
Art Tokle	Normal hill	62.5	100.5	18	63.0	99.0	20	199.5	18
Keith Wegeman	Normal hill	62.5	102.0	16	61.5	102.5	11	204.5	12

== Speed skating ==
Athlete	Event	Time	Rank
Bobby Fitzgerald	500 m	44.9	15
Ken Henry	500 m	43.2	1st place, gold medalist(s)
Don McDermott	500 m	43.9	2nd place, silver medalist(s)
Johnny Werket	500 m	44.5	11
Ken Henry	1500 m	2:25.0	17
Don McDermott	1500 m	2:28.8	28
Pat McNamara	1500 m	2:25.5	18
Johnny Werket	1500 m	2:24.3	12
Al Broadhurst	5000 m	9:09.2	34
Chuck Burke	5000 m	9:06.4	33
Ken Henry	5000 m	8:59.9	29
Pat McNamara	5000 m	8:53.4	24
Al Broadhurst	10,000 m	18:44.2	25
Chuck Burke	10,000 m	19:07.1	27
Pat McNamara	10,000 m	18:08.7	16
Johnny Werket	10,000 m	DNF	
