= Bobsleigh at the 1952 Winter Olympics – Four-man =

The four-man bobsleigh results at the 1952 Winter Olympics in Oslo, Norway. The competition was held on Thursday and Friday, 21 and 22 February 1952.

== Medallists ==
Gold	Silver	Bronze
Germany; Germany I Andreas Ostler; Friedrich Kuhn; Lorenz Nieberl; Franz Kemser	United States; USA I Stanley Benham; Patrick Martin; Howard Crossett; James Atkinson	Switzerland; Switzerland I Fritz Feierabend; Albert Madörin; André Filippini; Stephan Waser

== Results ==
Rank	Team	Athletes	Run 1	Run 2	Run 3	Run 4	Final
Gold	Germany Germany I	Andreas Ostler, Friedrich Kuhn, Lorenz Nieberl, & Franz Kemser	1:16.84	1:17.57	1:16.55	1:16.86	5:07.84
Silver	United States USA I	Stanley Benham, Patrick Martin, Howard Crossett, & James Atkinson	1:17.44	1:17.78	1:16.72	1:18.54	5:10.48
Bronze	Switzerland Switzerland I	Fritz Feierabend, Albert Madörin, André Filippini, & Stephan Waser	1:18.67	1:18.08	1:17.40	1:17.55	5:11.70
4	Switzerland Switzerland II	Felix Endrich, Fritz Stöckli, Franz Kapus, & Werner Spring	1:17.75	1:19.45	1:17.88	1:18.90	5:13.98
5	Austria Austria I	Karl Wagner, Franz Eckhardt, Hermann Palka, & Paul Aste	1:19.34	1:18.91	1:18.27	1:18.22	5:14.74
6	Sweden Sweden I	Kjell Holmström, Felix Fernström, Nils Landgren, & Jan Lapidoth	1:19.11	1:19.90	1:17.28	1:18.72	5:15.01
7	Sweden Sweden II	Gunnar Åhs, Börje Ekedahl, Lennart Sandin, & Gunnar Garpö	1:18.84	1:19.93	1:18.66	1:20.43	5:17.86
8	Argentina Argentina I	Carlos Tomasi, Robert Bordeu, Carlos Sareisian, & Héctor Tomasi	1:20.15	1:19.81	1:19.35	1:19.54	5:18.85
9	United States USA II	James Bickford, Hubert Miller, Maurice R. Severino, & Joseph Scott	1:19.13	1:19.97	1:19.49	1:21.09	5:19.68
10	Italy Italy II	Alberto Della Beffa, Sandro Rasini, Dario Colombi, & Dario Poggi	1:20.02	1:21.39	1:18.86	1:19.65	5:19.62
11	France France I	André Robin, Joseph Chatelus, Louis Saint-Calbre, & Henri Rivière	1:18.90	1:19.91	1:19.18	1:22.75	5:20.74
12	Norway Norway I	Arne Holst, Trygve Brudevold, Curt James Haydn, & Kåre Christiansen	1:20.05	1:19.93	1:19.98	1:21.40	5:21.36
13	Norway Norway II	Reidar Alveberg, Anders Hveem, Arne Røgden, & Gunnar Thoresen	1:21.53	1:21.18	1:20.77	1:20.99	5:24.47
14	Italy Italy II	Umberto Gilarduzzi, Michele Alverà, Vittorio Folonari, & Luigi Cavalieri	1:21.23	1:21.35	1:21.64	1:21.76	5:25.98
DNF	Austria Austria II	Kurt Loserth, Wilfried Thurner, Franz Kneissl, & Heinz Hoppichler	1:19.51	1:20.25	1:20.44		DNF
