= Austria at the 1952 Winter Olympics =

- IOC code: AUT
- NOC: Austrian Olympic Committee
- Website: www.olympia.at (in German)

in Oslo
- Competitors: 39 (31 men, 8 women) in 7 sports
- Flag bearer: Sepp Bradl
- Medals Ranked 5th: Gold 2 Silver 4 Bronze 2 Total 8

Winter Olympics appearances (overview)
- 1924; 1928; 1932; 1936; 1948; 1952; 1956; 1960; 1964; 1968; 1972; 1976; 1980; 1984; 1988; 1992; 1994; 1998; 2002; 2006; 2010; 2014; 2018; 2022; 2026

Austria competed at the 1952 Winter Olympics in Oslo, Norway.

== Medalists ==
Medal	Name	Sport	Event
Gold	Othmar Schneider	Alpine skiing	Men's slalom
Gold	Trude Beiser	Alpine skiing	Women's downhill
Silver	Othmar Schneider	Alpine skiing	Men's downhill
Silver	Christian Pravda	Alpine skiing	Men's giant slalom
Silver	Dagmar Rom	Alpine skiing	Women's giant slalom
Silver	Hellmut Seibt	Figure skating	Men's individual
Bronze	Christian Pravda	Alpine skiing	Men's downhill
Bronze	Toni Spiess	Alpine skiing	Men's giant slalom

== Alpine skiing ==
Men

Athlete	Event	Race 1		Race 2		Total	
Athlete	Event	Time	Rank	Time	Rank	Time	Rank
Egon Schöpf	Downhill					DSQ	–
Otto Linher	Downhill					2:47.9	28
Christian Pravda	Downhill					2:32.4	3rd place, bronze medalist(s)
Othmar Schneider	Downhill					2:32.0	2nd place, silver medalist(s)
Egon Schöpf	Giant Slalom					DSQ	–
Hans Senger	Giant Slalom					2:33.6	9
Toni Spiß	Giant Slalom					2:28.8	3rd place, bronze medalist(s)
Christian Pravda	Giant Slalom					2:26.9	2nd place, silver medalist(s)
Toni Spiß	Slalom	DNF	–	did not advance			
Christian Pravda	Slalom	1:01.5	10 Q	1:53.2	29	2:54.7	29
Othmar Schneider	Slalom	59.5	3 Q	1:00.5	2	2:00.0	1st place, gold medalist(s)
Hans Senger	Slalom	59.2	1 Q	DSQ	–	DSQ	–

Women

Athlete	Event	Race 1		Race 2		Total	
Athlete	Event	Time	Rank	Time	Rank	Time	Rank
Trude Klecker	Downhill					1:57.9	24
Dagmar Rom	Downhill					1:49.8	5
Erika Mahringer	Downhill					1:49.5	4
Trude Jochum-Beiser	Downhill					1:47.1	1st place, gold medalist(s)
Erika Mahringer	Giant Slalom					2:16.8	17
Trude Jochum-Beiser	Giant Slalom					2:14.3	11
Trude Klecker	Giant Slalom					2:11.4	4
Dagmar Rom	Giant Slalom					2:09.0	2nd place, silver medalist(s)
Dagmar Rom	Slalom	1:57.7	38	1:10.2	20	3:07.9	36
Erika Mahringer	Slalom	1:18.6	32	1:08.0	10	2:26.6	22
Rosi Sailer	Slalom	1:09.3	13	1:11.6	24	2:20.9	17
Trude Jochum-Beiser	Slalom	1:08.7	10	1:07.2	6	2:15.9	8

== Bobsleigh ==
Sled	Athletes	Event	Run 1		Run 2		Run 3		Run 4		Total	
Sled	Athletes	Event	Time	Rank	Time	Rank	Time	Rank	Time	Rank	Time	Rank
AUT-1	Karl Wagner; Franz Eckhardt	Two-man	1:24.16	10	1:24.54	9	1:24.00	9	1:24.34	11	5:37.04	9
AUT-2	Heinz Hoppichler; Wilfried Thurner	Two-man	1:30.27	18	1:28.30	16	1:27.78	16	1:27.51	16	5:53.86	16

Sled	Athletes	Event	Run 1		Run 2		Run 3		Run 4		Total	
Sled	Athletes	Event	Time	Rank	Time	Rank	Time	Rank	Time	Rank	Time	Rank
AUT-1	Karl Wagner; Franz Eckhardt; Hermann Palka; Paul Aste	Four-man	1:19.34	9	1:18.91	4	1:18.27	6	1:18.22	3	5:14.74	5
AUT-2	Kurt Loserth; Wilfried Thurner; Franz Kneissl; Heinz Hoppichler	Four-man	1:19.51	10	1:20.25	12	1:20.44	13	DNF	–	DNF	–

== Cross-country skiing ==
Men

Event	Athlete	Race	
Event	Athlete	Time	Rank
18 km	Peter Radacher	DNF	–
18 km	Sepp Schiffner	1'17:31	69
18 km	Leopold Kohl	1'13:10	51
18 km	Oskar Schulz	1'12:37	48
18 km	Friedrich Krischan	1'11:54	43
18 km	Hans Eder	1'10:13	31
18 km	Matthias Noichl	1'09:48	28
18 km	Sepp Schneeberger	1'09:12	23

Men's 4 × 10 km relay

Athletes	Race	
Athletes	Time	Rank
Hans Eder; Friedrich Krischan; Karl Rafreider; Josef Schneeberger	2'34:36	5

Women

Event	Athlete	Race	
Event	Athlete	Time	Rank
10 km	Lizzy Kladensky	DNF	–

== Figure skating ==
Men

Athlete	CF	FS	Points	Places	Rank
Kurt Oppelt	11	10	137.033	98	11
Helmut Seibt	2	5	180.144	23	2nd place, silver medalist(s)

Women

Athlete	CF	FS	Points	Places	Rank
Sissy Schwarz	22	18	126.878	178	19
Annelies Schilhan	19	12	134.744	140	16

Pairs

Athletes	Points	Places	Rank
Sissy Schwarz; Kurt Oppelt	9.469	83	9

== Nordic combined ==
Events:

- 18 km cross-country skiing
- normal hill ski jumping

The cross-country skiing part of this event was combined with the main medal event, meaning that athletes competing here were skiing for two disciplines at the same time. Details can be found above in this article, in the cross-country skiing section.

The ski jumping (normal hill) event was held separate from the main medal event of ski jumping, results can be found in the table below (athletes were allowed to perform three jumps, the best two jumps were counted and are shown here).

Athlete	Event	Cross-country		Ski Jumping				Total	
Athlete	Event	Points	Rank	Distance 1	Distance 2	Points	Rank	Points	Rank
Peter Radacher	Individual	DNF	–	57.0	58.0	150.0	24	DNF	–
Sepp Schiffner	Individual	185.030	21	59.5	60.5	186.5	19	371.530	20
Leopold Kohl	Individual	200.848	14	58.0	58.0	182.5	20	383.348	18
Hans Eder	Individual	211.575	11	62.0	64.5	209.0	4	420.575	9

== Ski jumping ==
Athlete	Event	Jump 1			Jump 2			Total	
Athlete	Event	Distance	Points	Rank	Distance	Points	Rank	Points	Rank
Sepp Bradl	Normal hill	50.5 (fall)	65.5	41	DNF	–	–	DNF	–
Hans Eder	Normal hill	57.5	95.5	28	55.5	93.0	31	188.5	29
Rudi Dietrich	Normal hill	63.0	97.5	23	62.5	100.5	16	198.0	21
Walter Steinegger	Normal hill	61.5	100.5	18	63.0	101.5	14	202.0	14

== Speed skating ==
Men

Event	Athlete	Race	
Event	Athlete	Time	Rank
500 m	Arthur Mannsbarth	47.6	37
500 m	Konrad Pecher	47.3	36
500 m	Franz Offenberger	45.9	25
1500 m	Konrad Pecher	2:34.8	36
1500 m	Arthur Mannsbarth	2:26.6	22
1500 m	Franz Offenberger	2:25.9	20
5000 m	Konrad Pecher	9:04.9	32
5000 m	Franz Offenberger	9:03.0	30
5000 m	Arthur Mannsbarth	8:36.3	8
10,000 m	Franz Offenberger	19:04.2	26
10,000 m	Arthur Mannsbarth	17:44.2	11
