= Speed skating at the 1952 Winter Olympics – Men's 10,000 metres =

Men's 10,000 metres speed skating at the VI Olympic Winter Games
- Pictogram for speed skating
- Venue: Bislett Stadium
- Date: 19 February 1952
- Competitors: 30 from 12 nations
- Winning time: 16:45.8 OR

Medalists
1st place, gold medalist(s)		Hjalmar Andersen	Norway
2nd place, silver medalist(s)		Kees Broekman	Netherlands
3rd place, bronze medalist(s)		Carl-Erik Asplund	Sweden

The 10,000 metre speed skating event was part of the speed skating at the 1952 Winter Olympics programme. It was the last speed skating contest at this Games. The competition was held on Tuesday, 19 February 1952, at 10 a.m. Thirty speed skaters from 12 nations competed.

== Medalists ==
Gold	Silver	Bronze
Hjalmar Andersen; Norway	Kees Broekman; Netherlands	Carl-Erik Asplund; Sweden

== Records ==
These were the standing world and Olympic records (in minutes) prior to the 1952 Winter Olympics.

World record	16:32.6(*)	(Norway) Hjalmar Andersen	Hamar (NOR)	10 February 1952
Olympic record	17:24.3	(Norway) Ivar Ballangrud	Garmisch-Partenkirchen (GER)	14 February 1936

(*) The record was set on naturally frozen ice.

Four speed skaters were faster than the standing Olympic record. Hjalmar Andersen set a new Olympic record with 16:45.8 minutes.

== Results ==
Place	Speed skater	Time
1	Hjalmar Andersen (NOR)	16:45.8 OR
2	Kees Broekman (NED)	17:10.6
3	Carl-Erik Asplund (SWE)	17:16.6
4	Pentti Lammio (FIN)	17:20.5
5	Anton Huiskes (NED)	17:25.5
6	Sverre Haugli (NOR)	17:30.2
7	Kazuhiko Sugawara (JPN)	17:34.0
8	Lassi Parkkinen (FIN)	17:36.8
9	Göthe Hedlund (SWE)	17:39.2
10	John Hearn (GBR)	17:41.5
11	Arthur Mannsbarth (AUT)	17:44.2
12	Kauko Salomaa (FIN)	17:49.6
13	Sigvard Ericsson (SWE)	17:52.8
14	Yoshiyasu Gomi (JPN)	17:53.0
15	Norman Holwell (GBR)	18:02.4
16	Pat McNamara (USA)	18:08.7
17	József Merényi (HUN)	18:09.0
18	Yngvar Karlsen (NOR)	18:10.6
19	Egbert van 't Oever (NED)	18:20.8
20	Gunnar Hallkvist (SWE)	18:20.9
21	Ralf Olin (CAN)	18:22.8
22	Theo Meding (GER)	18:24.4
23	Matti Tuomi (FIN)	18:25.5
24	Craig MacKay (CAN)	18:27.4
25	Al Broadhurst (USA)	18:44.2
26	Franz Offenberger (AUT)	19:04.2
27	Chuck Burke (USA)	19:07.1
28	Guido Caroli (ITA)	19:13.6
—	Ingar Nordlund (NOR)	DNF
—	Johnny Werket (USA)	DNF

Yoshiyasu Gomi fell once and Egbert van 't Oever fell twice. Ingar Nordlund and Johnny Werket gave up.
