= Speed skating at the 1952 Winter Olympics – Men's 5000 metres =

Men's 5000 metres speed skating at the VI Olympic Winter Games
- Pictogram for speed skating
- Venue: Bislett Stadium
- Date: 17 February 1952
- Competitors: 35 from 13 nations
- Winning time: 8:10.6

Medalists
1st place, gold medalist(s)		Hjalmar Andersen	Norway
2nd place, silver medalist(s)		Kees Broekman	Netherlands
3rd place, bronze medalist(s)		Sverre Haugli	Norway

The 5000 metres speed skating event was part of the speed skating at the 1952 Winter Olympics programme. The competition was held on Sunday, 17 February 1952, at 4 p.m. Thirty-five speed skaters from 13 nations competed.

== Medalists ==
Gold	Silver	Bronze
Hjalmar Andersen (NOR)	Kees Broekman (NED)	Sverre Haugli (NOR)

== Records ==
These were the standing world and Olympic records (in minutes) prior to the 1952 Winter Olympics.

World Record	8:07.3(*)	(Norway) Hjalmar Andersen	Trondheim (NOR)	13 January 1951
World Record	8:03.7(**)	(Soviet Union) Nikolay Mamonov	Medeo (URS)	23 January 1952
Olympic Record	8:19.6	(Norway) Ivar Ballangrud	Garmisch-Partenkirchen (GER)	12 February 1936

(*) The record was set on naturally frozen ice.

(**) This record was not recognized before the 1955 ISU Congress. It was set in a high altitude venue (more than 1000 metres above sea level) and on naturally frozen ice.

Hjalmar Andersen set a new Olympic record with 8:10.6 minutes.

== Results ==
Nikolay Mamonov who set a faster time than the standing world record (later recognized as world record) did not compete as the Soviet Union did not participate in Winter Games before 1956.

Place	Speed skater	Time
1	Hjalmar Andersen (NOR)	8:10.6 OR
2	Kees Broekman (NED)	8:21.6
3	Sverre Haugli (NOR)	8:22.4
4	Anton Huiskes (NED)	8:28.5
5	Wim van der Voort (NED)	8:30.6
6	Carl-Erik Asplund (SWE)	8:30.7
7	Pentti Lammio (FIN)	8:31.9
8	Arthur Mannsbarth (AUT)	8:36.3
9	Wiggo Hanssen (NOR)	8:37.2
10	Yoshiyasu Gomi (JPN)	8:38.6
11	Göthe Hedlund (SWE)	8:39.2
12	Matti Tuomi (FIN)	8:40.0
13	Kauko Salomaa (FIN)	8:40.1
14	Sigvard Ericsson (SWE)	8:40.8
15	Kazuhiko Sugawara (JPN)	8:44.4
16	Norman Holwell (GBR)	8:44.5
17	John Hearn (GBR)	8:47.0
18	John Wickström (SWE)	8:47.2
19	Egbert van 't Oever (NED)	8:47.6
20	Yngvar Karlsen (NOR)	8:48.2
21	Ferenc Lőrincz (HUN)	8:51.2
22	Kalevi Laitinen (FIN)	8:52.4
23	Craig MacKay (CAN)	8:52.5
24	Pat McNamara (USA)	8:53.4
25	Ralf Olin (CAN)	8:54.2
26	József Merényi (HUN)	8:56.6
27	Theo Meding (GER)	8:57.4
28	Colin Hickey (AUS)	8:57.6
29	Ken Henry (USA)	8:59.9
30	Franz Offenberger (AUT)	9:03.0
31	Bill Jones (GBR)	9:03.7
32	Konrad Pecher (AUT)	9:04.9
33	Chuck Burke (USA)	9:06.4
34	Al Broadhurst (USA)	9:09.2
35	Pierre Huylebroeck (BEL)	9:34.4
