= Alpine skiing at the 1952 Winter Olympics – Women's slalom =

Women's alpine skiing slalom at the VI Olympic Winter Games
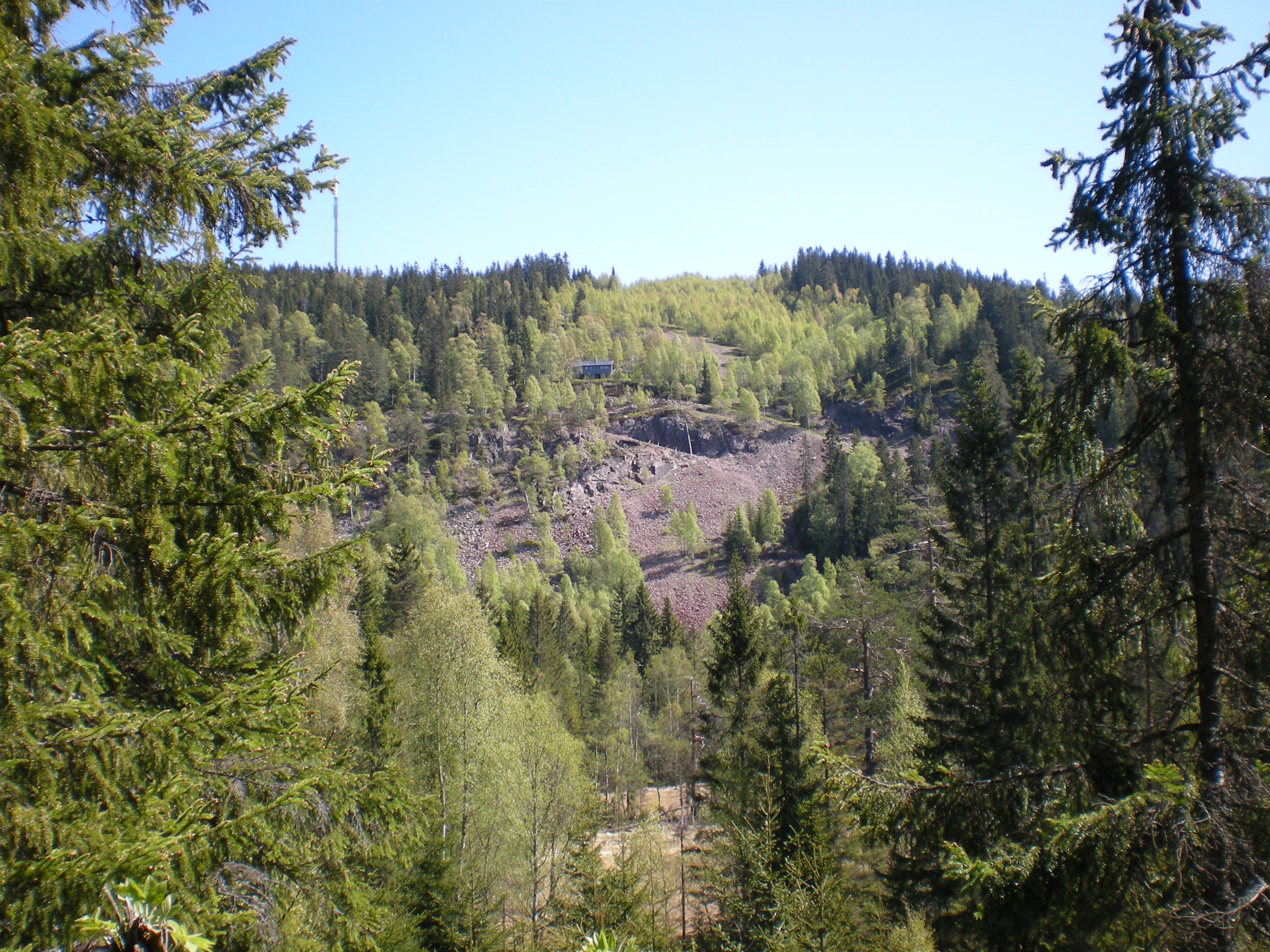
- Rødkleiva, the site of the alpine skiing slalom events
- Venue: Rødkleiva; Oslo, Norway
- Date: 20 February 1952
- Competitors: 40 from 14 nations
- Winning time: 2:10.6

Medalists
1st place, gold medalist(s)		Andrea Mead Lawrence	United States
2nd place, silver medalist(s)		Ossi Reichert	Germany
3rd place, bronze medalist(s)		Annemarie Buchner	Germany

A women's slalom event was held at the 1952 Winter Olympics in Oslo, Norway as part of the alpine skiing programme.

On 24 January, a decision was taken that Rødkleiva would hold the slalom events, but at that time there was only 10 inches (25 cm) of snow at the site and additional work lasting three days had to be done to ensure the hill would be usable for training and the races. However, the athletes had to shift their training to Norefjell by 9 February after more problems with the snow resulted in the hill "[looking] almost like a skating rink" according to the official report. It took a further week of work by the military, volunteers and hired help to spread 220,000 cubic feet (6,200 m^{3}) of snow resulting in a new snow depth of around 12–16 inches (30–41 cm).

The event eventually took place as scheduled on 20 February, a day after the men's slalom races. It was the final alpine skiing event of the Games. There were a total of 26 gates on the women's course. A total of 14 National Olympic Committees were represented at the event by 40 skiers.

Andrea Mead Lawrence, representing the United States, and Dagmar Rom, representing Austria, were considered to be the favourites in the event. However, both skiers suffered falls on their first run, with Mead Lawrence placing fourth and Rom finishing last, effectively putting the latter out of contention. Mead Lawrence managed to post the best time of the second runs, enough to win the gold medal. It was her second gold medal in Oslo after her giant slalom victory. By winning the title, she became the first American skier to win two gold medals at the same Olympics. Ossi Reichert, who led the field after the first run, finished two seconds behind Mead Lawrence in the second run and ended up second overall. Reichert's teammate Annemarie Buchner won bronze.

== Results ==
The official results as published by the Organising Committee for the VI Olympic Winter Games were as follows:

Rank	Bib	Name	Country	Run 1	Run 2	Total
1st place, gold medalist(s)	5	Andrea Mead Lawrence	United States	1:07.2	1:03.4	2:10.6
2nd place, silver medalist(s)	19	Ossi Reichert	Germany	1:06.0	1:05.4	2:11.4
3rd place, bronze medalist(s)	3	Annemarie Buchner	Germany	1:07.6	1:05.7	2:13.3
4	4	Celina Seghi	Italy	1:06.5	1:07.3	2:13.8
5	36	Imogene Opton	United States	1:07.4	1:06.7	2:14.1
6	7	Madeleine Berthod	Switzerland	1:06.7	1:08.2	2:14.9
7	21	Marysette Agnel	France	1:07.5	1:08.1	2:15.6
8	8	Trude Beiser-Jochum	Austria	1:08.7	1:07.2	2:15.9
8	15	Giuliana Minuzzo	Italy	1:08.0	1:07.9	2:15.9
10	11	Olivia Ausoni	Switzerland	1:07.4	1:09.6	2:17.0
11	16	Borghild Niskin	Norway	1:08.7	1:09.0	2:17.7
12	1	Sarah Thomasson	Sweden	1:09.9	1:08.4	2:18.3
13	37	Joanne Hewson	Canada	1:09.2	1:10.7	2:19.9
14	31	Barbara Grocholska	Poland	1:10.2	1:10.1	2:20.3
15	12	Janette Weston Burr	United States	1:11.2	1:09.3	2:20.5
16	29	Margaretha Jakobsson	Sweden	1:10.4	1:10.2	2:20.6
17	25	Rosi Sailer	Austria	1:09.3	1:11.6	2:20.9
18	34	Margit Hvammen	Norway	1:09.8	1:11.4	2:21.2
19	10	Rhoda Wurtele-Eaves	Canada	1:12.0	1:09.9	2:21.9
20	30	Kerstin Ahlqvist	Sweden	1:10.8	1:12.5	2:23.3
21	2	Katy Rodolph	United States	1:17.6	1:06.4	2:24.0
22	13	Erika Mahringer	Austria	1:18.6	1:08.0	2:26.6
23	26	Karen-Sofie Styrmoe	Norway	1:15.0	1:12.6	2:27.6
24	27	Hilary Laing	Great Britain	1:13.7	1:14.2	2:27.9
25	20	Edmée Abetel	Switzerland	1:13.9	1:14.4	2:28.3
26	28	Lucile Wheeler	Canada	1:12.2	1:16.2	2:28.4
27	43	Ingrid Englund	Sweden	1:14.8	1:13.9	2:28.7
28	33	Sheena Mackintosh	Great Britain	1:16.2	1:13.2	2:29.4
29	35	Ana Maria Dellai	Argentina	1:14.4	1:15.3	2:29.7
30	40	Ildikó Szendrődi	Hungary	1:14.7	1:15.6	2:30.3
31	23	Hannelore Franke	Germany	1:20.7	1:10.1	2:30.8
32	42	Teresa Kodelska	Poland	1:14.7	1:19.0	2:33.7
33	17	Tull Gasmann	Norway	1:29.4	1:07.5	2:36.9
34	41	Maria Kowalska	Poland	1:30.1	1:25.5	2:55.6
35	24	Marianne Seltsam	Germany	1:15.5^{*}	1:50.3	3:05.8
36	9	Dagmar Rom	Austria	1:57.7	1:10.2	3:07.9
37	32	Rosemarie Schutz	Canada	1:56.7	1:12.2	3:08.9
	22	Ida Schöpfer	Switzerland	1:24.3	DSQ	
	6	Andrée Bermond	France	DSQ		
	44	Annette Johnson	New Zealand	DSQ		
