= Norefjell Ski Resort =

Norwegian ski resort

Norefjell
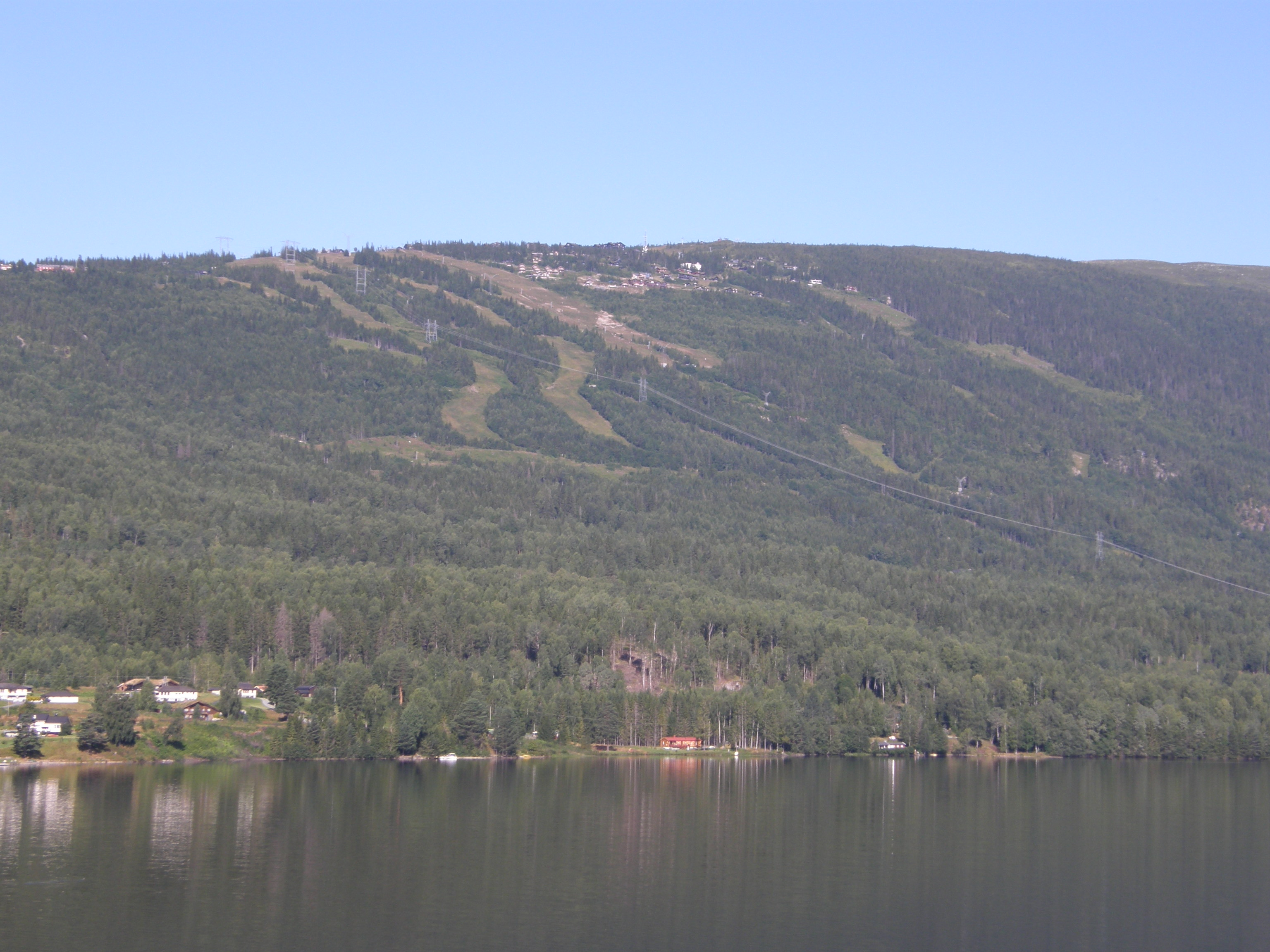
- The slopes looking across Krøderen

- Location in Norway
- Location: Krødsherad, Buskerud; Norway
- Nearest city: Oslo - 90 minutes
- Coordinates: 60.22°N 9.60°E
- Vertical: 1,008 m (3,307 ft)
- Top elevation: 1,188 m (3,898 ft)
- Base elevation: 180 m (591 ft)
- Website: norefjell.com

Norefjell Ski Resort (Norwegian: Norefjell skisenter) is a mountain ski resort located in Krødsherad, Norway, on the mountainside of Norefjell. The venue for four Olympic alpine skiing events in 1952, it is located northwest of Oslo, 90 minutes away by vehicle.

== History ==
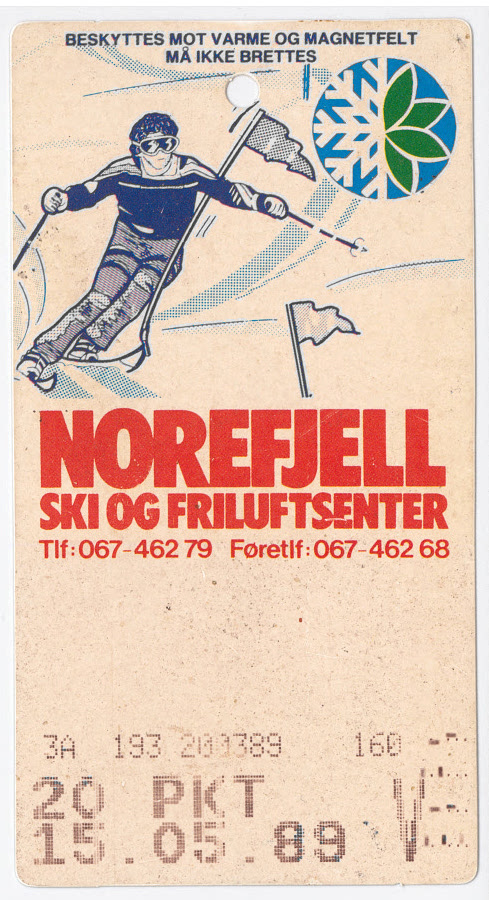
Ski lift ticket for Norefjell

Proposals for downhill skiing in Norefjell were first launched in the 1930s by a group of ski enthusiasts led by Per Fossum. They brought the issue to the attention of the Norwegian Ski Federation, who started negotiations with the landowners. A lease was signed in 1938 as the first such agreement made by the federation. The property was cleared during the summer and grooming started after the first snowfall. The management of the course was organized by Krødsherad IL with assistance from IF Liv for larger championships. The course was renovated slightly in 1947, with the curves being widened.

Oslo was awarded the 1952 Winter Olympics in June 1947, with Norefjell responsible for downhill and giant slalom. The last discipline, slalom, was held at Rødkleiva in Oslo. The Olympics led to a series of infrastructure upgrades, both to the venue and the community, which had a positive impact on local quality of life. Large parts of the investment costs were covered by Oslo Municipality. Major facilities included constructing a bridge in Noresund, a new road from Noresund to Fjellhvil, a telecommunications building on the hill that included 12 communications lines and facilities for the race director, 30 telephone lines along the course, and construction of the Norefjellstua hotel. The organizing committee originally planned to use military trucks or tracked vehicles, but this was protested against by the International Ski Federation (FIS), resulting in the construction of a ski lift. The power supply turned out to be insufficient, so a mobile generator was used to power the ski lift.

The Olympic winter turned out to be one with little snow. Voss was a reserve venue, but they needed advance notice to prepare their facilities. The Norefjell course had problems with stones and branches, which had to be removed by hand, and additional snow was brought in from around the course. During the Olympics, grooming, ticket sales and concession sales were undertaken by Krødsherad IL and Ytre Krødsherad IF. The men's downhill course started at 900 meters (3,000 ft) above mean sea level; the course was 2,600 meters (8,500 ft) long and fell 700 meters (2,300 ft).

The Olympics spurred local interest in Alpine skiing and many young people bought equipment. Starting in the 1960s, several new courses were built. A snow groomer was bought in 1969. Norefjell was selected as the central Alpine skiing venue for Buskerud and Vestfold in 1972, which eased access to state grants. Construction of Bøe Ski Center started but was never completed according to the plans. Snowmaking equipment was installed in 1984. Construction of Aplinstua KIL, a lounge at the bottom of the hill, was started after the demolition of the technical building in 1986. Costing NOK 1.1 million, it served as a good source of income for Kørdsherad IL's Alpine group. It opened in time for the 1987 Winter Deaflympics. Floodlighting was installed in Vinkelheisbakken in 1988, costing NOK 550,000.

In 2007, Oslo started a bid process to host the 2018 Winter Olympics. There were two possible venues for Alpine skiing: Norefjell, or a combination of Kvitfjell and Hafjell, which had been used for the 1994 Winter Olympics in Lillehammer. Mayor Per Ditlev-Simonsen has stated that he and the bid committee had originally planned to bid with Norefjell, but that International Olympic Committee (IOC) member Gerhard Heiberg recommended that Oslo instead bid with Hafjell and Kvitfjell. IOC President Jacques Rogge later stated that a distance of 240 kilometers (150 mi) between Oslo and the Alpine venues would rule out acceptance of Oslo's bid. In a documentary made by the Norwegian Broadcasting Corporation, it was stated that Heiberg was in favor of the Tromsø bid, and recommended Oslo to bid with Hafjell and Kvitfjell to reduce their chances of being selected as the national candidate. In the 2022 bid proposal, Oslo is also planning to use Hafjell and Kvitfjell in an attempt to maximize the reuse of existing venues.

== Events ==
The first competition at Norefjell was arranged by the Norwegian Ski Federation on 16 January 1939, as a training race ahead of the FIS Alpine World Ski Championships 1939, After the World Championships, a national competition was held in Norefjell, which was won by Johan Kvernberg. Activities were interrupted by World War II, but from 1946 tournaments were again arranged. A national tournament was arranged on 16 January 1947. Norefjell was used for the Norwegian championship in downhill and giant slalom on 2 and 3 March 1951. It held the Norwegian championship in downhill and giant slalom in 1956. Slalom was planned to take place in Rødkleiva, but lack of snow in the capital forced the discipline to be moved to Norefjell. The venue hosted the Alpine skiing at the 1987 Winter Deaflympics on 5–7 February and the Norwegian Junior Alpine Ski Championships from 4 to 10 March 1991. Norefjell has hosted an annual FIS race in giant slalom since 1991.

=== Holmenkollen Kandahar ===
Holmenkollen Kandahar was introduced as part of the Holmenkollen Ski Festival in 1947. The combined event originally had slalom contested at Rødkleiva and downhill contested at Norefjell. The inaugural Norefjell race took place on 5 March 1947, and was won by Stein Eriksen in the men's class and May Nilsson in the women's class. The inaugural competition also included a military championship with competitors from five countries. The following year, Olav K. Væhle was killed in Holmenkollen Kandahar when he collided with a tree. In 1949, there was not sufficient snow and the arrangement had to be moved to Voss. The 1951 edition was an Olympic trial event; the season saw heavy snowfall and the race was difficult to arrange because of a blizzard. This race saw the entire world elite compete and was won by Stein Eriksen. Holmenkollen Kandahar was held at Norefjell in 1947–48, 1950–51, 1953, 1955, 1957, 1960–63, and 1972–75.

=== 1952 Winter Olympics ===
Norefjell was used for giant slalom and downhill during the 1952 Winter Olympics. Training took place on 11 to 13 February, while the races took place on 14 to 17 February. Temperatures were in the range of −17 to −13 °C (1 to 9 °F). The most popular event was the men's downhill, which attracted 20,000 spectators.

| Event | Gold | Silver | Bronze |
|---|---|---|---|
| Men's downhill | Zeno Colò; Italy | Othmar Schneider; Austria | Christian Pravda; Austria |
| Men's giant slalom | Stein Eriksen; Norway | Christian Pravda; Austria | Toni Spiß; Austria |
| Women's downhill | Trude Jochum-Beiser; Austria | Annemarie Buchner; Germany | Giuliana Minuzzo; Italy |
| Women's giant slalom | Andrea Mead Lawrence; United States | Dagmar Rom; Austria | Annemarie Buchner; Germany |
