= Rødkleiva =

Hill in Norway

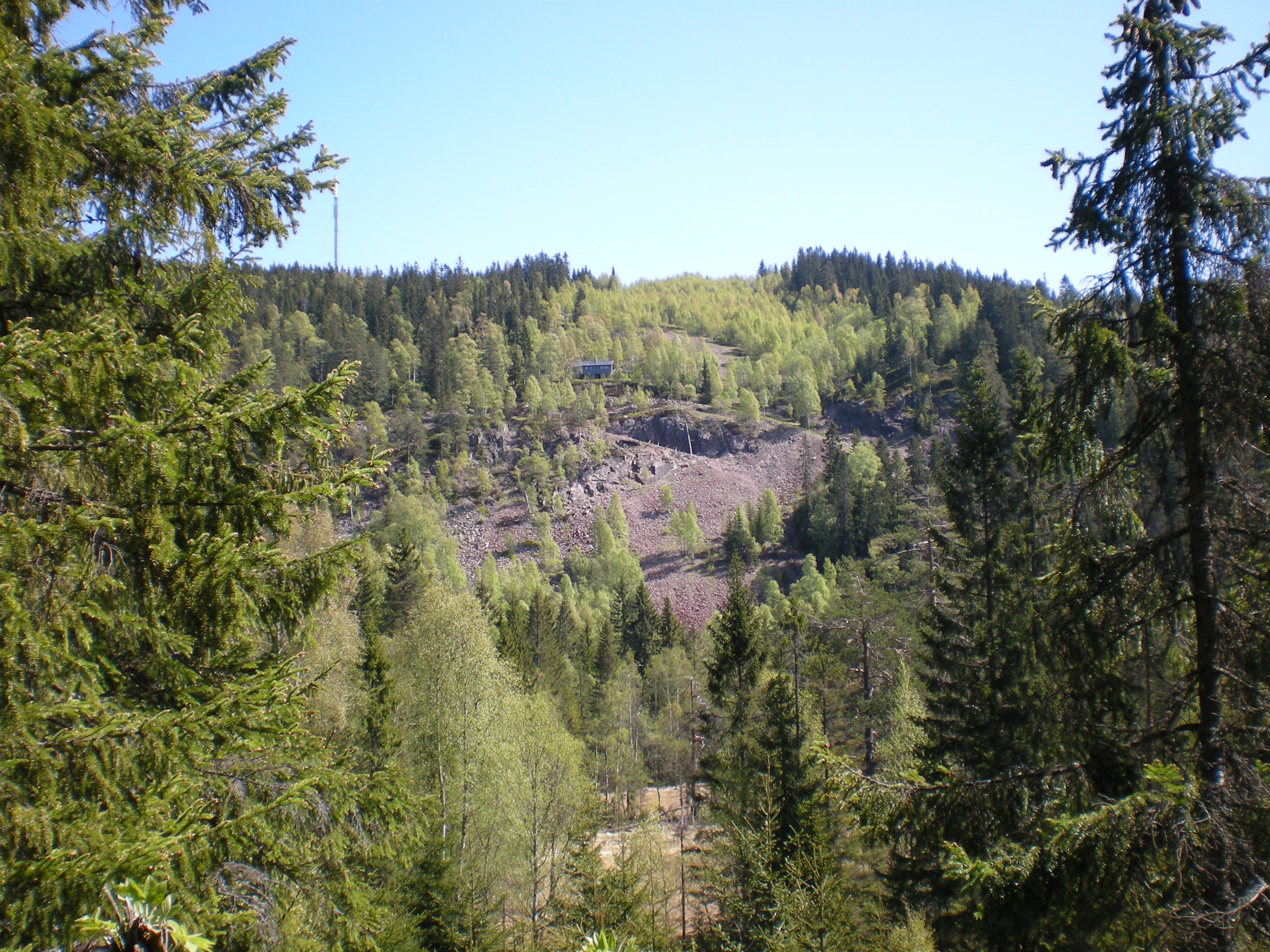
- Interactive map of Rødkleiva
- Location: Nordmarka, Oslo, Norway
- Nearest city: Oslo
- Coordinates: 59°59′08″N 10°39′14″E
- Vertical: 169 m (554 ft)
- Top elevation: 479 m (1,572 ft) AMSL
- Base elevation: 310 m (1,017 ft)
- Trails: 1
- Longest run: 422.5 m (1,386 ft)
- Lift system: Double pull-hook

Rødkleiva is a hill located in Nordmarka in Oslo, Norway. It was taken into use as a slalom hill in 1947 and was used for the combined event of the Holmenkollen Ski Festival eleven times between 1947 and 1963. It hosted the slalom events for the 1952 Winter Olympics, which saw a crowd of at least 25,000 spectators. The Olympic course was 422.5 meters (1,386 ft) long and had a drop of 169 meters (554 ft). The course gradually fell into disrepair and was closed in 1988.

The hill has several times been launched as a potential location for a ski jumping hill. The first idea came in 1912; later options to replace Holmenkollbakken resurfaced during the 1930s and the 1970s, but were quickly rejected. With the closing of Midtstubakken, Oslo's normal hill, in the late 1980s, Rødkleiva was again launched as a jumping hill. Vikersundbakken—Northern Europe's only ski flying hill—was in the late 1990s proposed replaced by a new hill in Rødkleiva. The plans received support from the Norwegian Ski Federation, but the municipality and state were not interested in issuing grants and the proposal was finally laid to rest in 2006.

== History ==
=== Slalom hill ===
The first proposal for using Rødkleiva for skiing was made by Fritz Huitfeldt in 1912. At the time Holmenkollbakken allowed jumps to 30 meters (98 ft) and Huitfeldt's proposal to build an 80-meter (260 ft) hill was not taken seriously. In the 1930s, the idea of building a ski jump at Rødkleiva was renewed. However, Rødkleiva was rejected by the board of the Association for the Promotion of Skiing and in 1938 Holmenkollbakken was instead upgraded with scaffolding.

In 1939, the Norwegian Ski Federation proposed that the Association for the Promotion of Skiing arrange slalom as part of the Holmenkollen Ski Festival, but the plans were interrupted by World War II. The slalom hill was inaugurated in 1947, allowing Alpine skiing to be introduced in the Holmenkollen Ski Festival. Slalom took place at Rødkleiva while the downhill was carried out at Norefjell Ski Resort in Krødsherad. The event was named Holmenkollen Kandahar and the races in Rødkleiva were organized by SFK Lyn. Permanent cables for telephone and timing were installed in 1949.

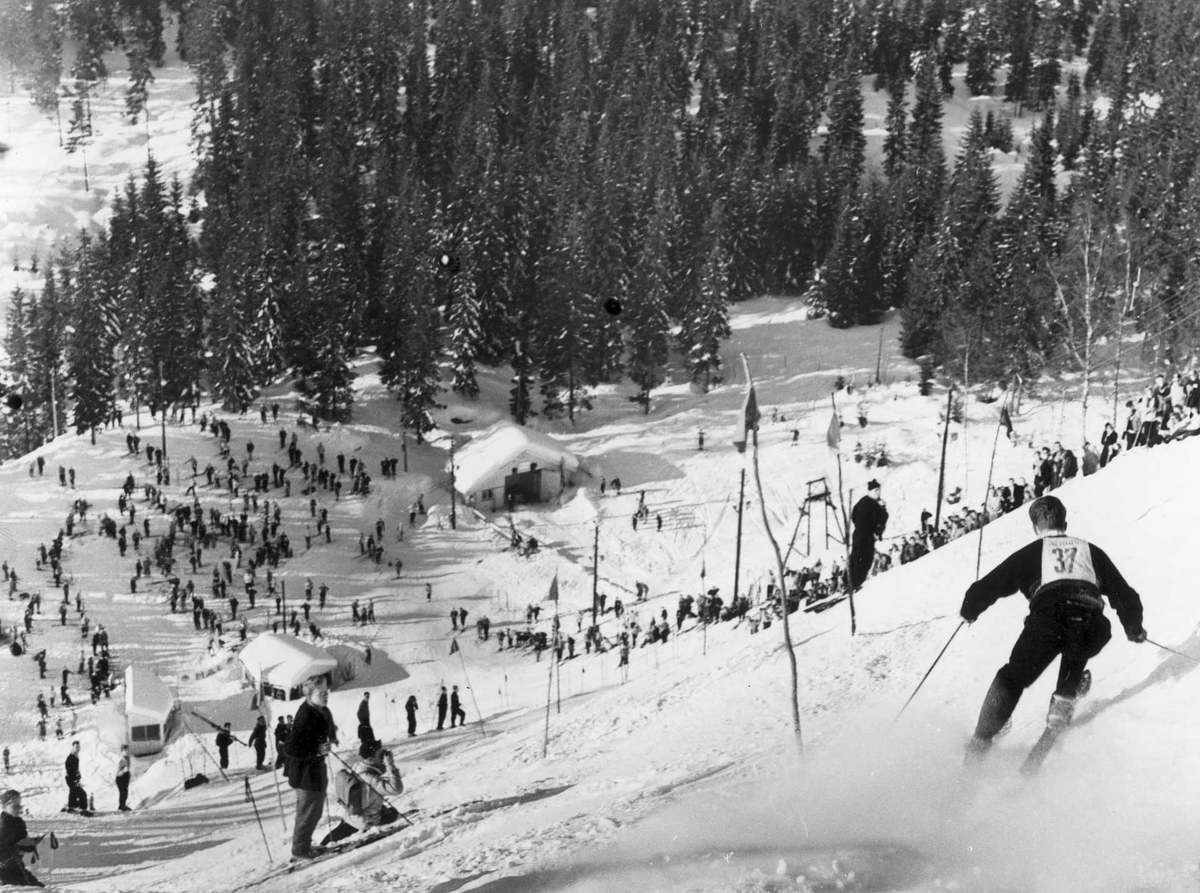
Stein Eriksen during the 1952 Winter Olympics

A series of upgrades were made to the hill ahead of the 1952 Winter Olympics. A start platform was constructed at the top of the hill to ensure better start conditions. A double pull-hook ski lift was built on the north side of the hill. Floodlights were installed along the course to allow training and work during the evening. Ten loudspeakers and three microphones were installed as a transportable system. The hump at the top of the hill was leveled somewhat and the earthwork used to build out the bottom of the hill. The road from Lillevann Station on the Holmenkollen Line was upgraded and a tunnel laid under the course to allow spectators to gather on both sides. A 200-seat press stand, including work stations and telephone booths, was constructed on the south side of the bottom of the hill. Opposite a stand for official guests was built, with a capacity for 300 people. Boxes at the finish line were built for officials and time-keepers. The upgrades to the venue cost 336,000 Norwegian krone (NOK). During the Olympics the hill was 422.5 meters (1,386 ft) long and had a drop of 169 meters (554 ft), starting at 479 meters (1,572 ft) above mean sea level.

The Young Men's Christian Association built a cabin at Ruudshøgda, next to Rødkleiva, which was completed in 1961. A new proposal to build a large ski jumping hill in Rødkleiva was launched during the early 1970s, but the Association for the Promotion of Skiing rejected the plans.

From the 1970s, Association for the Promotion of Skiing worked with plans to renovate the hill, especially to fill in the lower section close to Lillevann. The proposal met little support from the municipality, who wanted to prioritize Wyllerløypa, which was much cheaper to upgrade. Thus Rødkleiva was degraded to a training course. On 2 October 1986 the city council changed their opinion and granted funds for upgrading the hill. The upgrade would have given sufficient standard to allow FIS Alpine Ski World Cup events in slalom to be held and was part of a municipal strategy to market Oslo as a winter sports destination. In 1987, a proposal was made for the Holmenkollen area to become a national arena for freestyle skiing, with Rødkleiva to be made into a permanent mogul course. The hill was taken over by Tryvann Ski Resort in 1988. Plans to build a new ski lift which would connect with the other slopes were launched in November of that year. Rødkleiva was planned as the main competition hill for slalom and would regain its Olympics size. Det Norske Veritas withdrew Rødkleiva's approval in October 1988, especially noting the poor condition of the ski lift. The necessary upgrades would cost "millions". In 1989 the municipality proposed building a replacement for Midtstubakken at Rødkleiva, which would serve as Oslo's new normal hill as a supplement to the large Holmenkollbakken.

=== Ski flying hill proposal ===
Vikersundbakken opened as Northern Europe's only ski flying hill in March 1966. The hill was later renovated and expanded ahead of the FIS Ski-Flying World Championships 1977 and again ahead of the FIS Ski-Flying World Championships 1990. Holmenkollen National Arena and Holmenkollbakken were declared the national venue for Nordic skiing in 1997, ahead of Granåsen in Trondheim and Lysgårdsbakken in Lillehammer. By then ideas had been launched to build a national ski flying hill in Rødkleiva. However, it was rejected both by Holmenkollen director Rolf Nyhus and ski jumping director Odd Hammernes, who stated that a new ski flying hill would be too expensive.

In March 1998, former president of the Norwegian Ski Federation Christian Mohn announced plans for a hill in Rødkleiva which would allow jumps to 230 meters (750 ft). The venue, estimated to cost between NOK 100 and 150 million, was financed entirely with private funding; the costs would be covered by drawing between 50,000 and 80,000 spectators to an annual FIS Ski Jumping World Cup event. The plans scheduled completion in 2001. The location was, in addition to the close proximity to Oslo, chosen because the venue would be built tightly to the ground, thus eliminating any wind issues, the main reason for ski jumping events to be canceled. Mohn stated that ski flying was the future in ski jumping and that there would be place for two ski flying hills in Norway. This was rejected by Vikersundbakken-director Johan Kaggestad who stated that a new Rødkleiva hill would "kill" Vikersundbakken.

By December 1998, Mohn's successor Jan Jensen was supporting granting Vikersundbakken national venue status in preparation for it hosting the FIS Ski-Flying World Championships 2000. By December, a limited company had been established to continue the planning and construction of the hill. In July 1999, Vikersundbakken was granted a national venue status for ten years, which secured both state grants and the right to hold all World Cup ski flying events the following ten years. After the 2000 World Championships, Vikersundbakken's Torstein Haugerud protested that Bertil Pålsrud, who was both managing director of Rødkleiva Skiflyging and a member of the Norwegian Ski Federation's ski jumping committee, was using his position in the federation to promote the Rødkleiva project.

In February 2003, the Norwegian Ski Federation published an eighty-page report which concluded that Vikersundbakken should be retired and replaced with Rødkleiva. The report estimated that a hill would cost NOK 200 million and would allow jumps to 250 meters (820 ft), 25 meters (82 ft) longer than the then world record hill Letalnica Bratov Gorišek in Planica, Slovenia. Rødkleiva was regarded as more favorable because of the ease of transport, high population concentration, and that an all-new hill would allow for better television pictures. The federation's goal was for Norway to regain its status as the prime organizer of ski jumping competitions. President of the Norwegian Ski Federation Sverre Seeberg stated that they had offered the International Ski Federation (FIS) to use Vikersundbakken every year, but that FIS had prioritized Granåsen for the World Cup. Seeberg stated that Norway would therefore focus on making Granåsen the regular venue for the World Cup opening.

Oslo announced in January 2004 that they, jointly with Lillehammer, planned to bid for the 2014 Winter Olympics. Deputy Mayor Svenn Kristiansen (Progress Party) speculated that normal hill ski jumping would be replaced with ski flying on the Olympic program and that it therefore would be necessary to build a ski flying hill in Oslo. In November 2004, a Norwegian Ski Federation committee concluded that a new hill in Rødkleiva should be prioritized and that is would cost between NOK 300 and 400 million. The following month Minister of Culture Valgerd Svarstad Haugland (Christian Democratic Party) criticized the federation for allowing Bertil Pålsrud and Steinar Johannesen to hold key roles in the decision process, while both owned a 13.3-percent stake in Rødkleiva Skiflyging.

As part of Oslo's bid to host the FIS Nordic World Ski Championships 2011, it was necessary to build a normal hill, as Holmenkollbakken only consists of a large hill. Several proposals were made, including converting Holmenkollbakken to a normal hill and building a large hill in Rødkleiva, or building a new hill in Holmenkollen and building a small hill in Rødkleiva. Alternatively, a new small hill could be built at the location of the demolished Midtstubakken, next to Holmenkollbakken. City Councilor for Culture Anette Wiig Bryn (Progress Party) supported building a large hill in Rødkleiva and reducing Holmenkollbakken to a small hill.

On 20 April 2005, the Norwegian Ski Federation's board supported, with 13 against 1 vote, to build both a normal and a large hill at Rødkleiva and to close Vikersundbakken. However, the following day Svarstad Haugland stated that the government supported keeping Vikersundbakken rather than building a new venue in Rødkleiva. Clas Brede Bråthen responded that the federation hoped to build the venue with grants from the private sector, such as naming rights, and used Color Line Stadion in Ålesund as an example of a venue that had generated significant funding from corporate sponsors. A majority of the county chapters supported Vikersundbakken, with only 4 of 19 chapters supporting Rødkleiva. The Norwegian Ski Federation's national convention voted on 28 May with a large majority to place first a normal hill and then a ski flying hill at Rødkleiva.

The decision was made despite that no political parties in Oslo supported constructing a ski flying hill and that neither the municipality nor the state were willing to issue grants. There were also concerns from environmental groups as Rødkleiva lies within a protected area. Two days after the convention decision, Vikersundbakken applied to host a World Cup event in 2007. At a public meeting in August, politicians from all parties confirmed that they would not support Rødkleiva and City Council Chair Erling Lae declared the meeting as a funeral for the project. Yet the federation established a committee, led by Seeberg, to explore ways the venue could be financed and built. In December 2006, Steinar Johannessen stated that he and the federation had given up having a ski jumping hill at Rødkleiva.

== Events ==
Alpine skiing in the Holmenkollen Ski Festival was contested as a combined event, originally with slalom in Rødkleiva and downhill in Norefjell. Named the Holmenkollen Kandahar, it was inaugurated in 1947. The event was held in Rødkleiva in 1947–48, 1950–51, 1953, 1957–58, and 1960–63. From 1972 the slalom event was held at Kirkerudbakken in Bærum the years it was in the Oslo area and from 1977 it was held in Wyllerløypa when held in the Oslo area. The local sports club IF Ready was the main user of Rødkleiva for organized recreational sports.

=== 1952 Winter Olympics ===
During the 1952 Winter Olympics, Rødkleiva hosted the men's slalom and the women's slalom, with the other events taking place at Norefjell. The organizing committee had set up 15,000 tickets for the men's discipline on 19 February, but between 25,000 and 30,000 people attended the race, the surplus who did not pay for tickets. The large popularity was to see Norway's favoured Stein Eriksen. Although leading after the first heat, he came out of balance in the second and finished second behind Austria's Othmar Schneider. The women's race held the following day was won by the American Andrea Mead Lawrence.

Event	Gold	Silver	Bronze
Men's slalom	Othmar Schneider; Austria	Stein Eriksen; Norway	Guttorm Berge; Norway
Women's slalom	Andrea Mead Lawrence; United States	Ossi Reichert; Germany	Annemarie Buchner; Germany
