= List of Winter Olympics venues: N–R =

For the Winter Olympics, there are three venues starting with the letter 'N', 16 starting with the letter 'O', 14 starting with the letter 'P', none starting with the letter 'Q', and eight starting with the letter 'R'.

== N ==
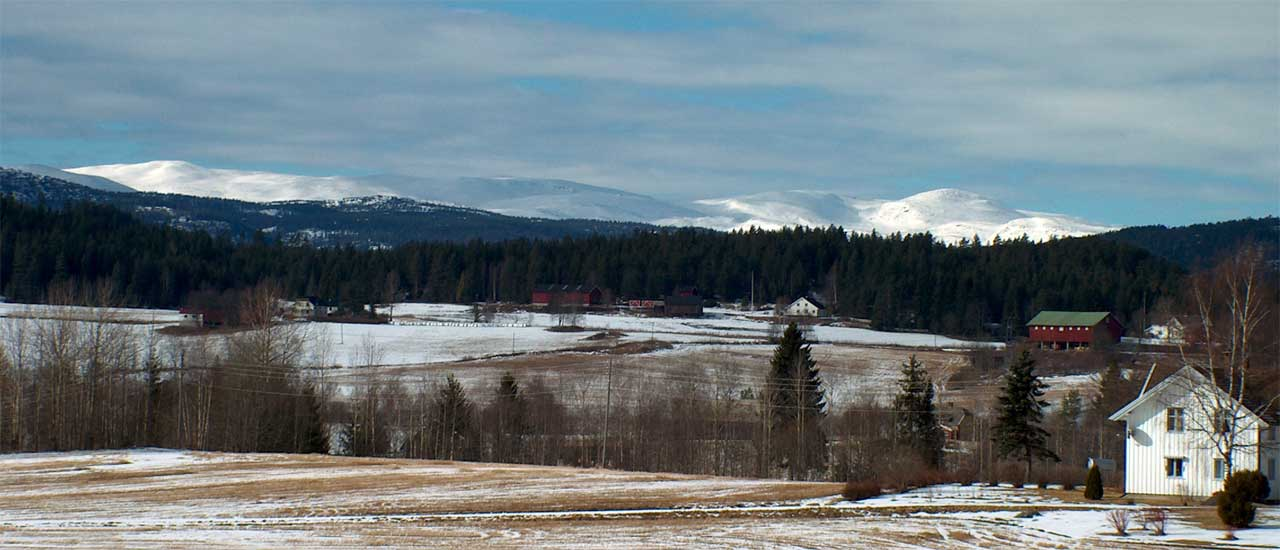
Norefjell hosted the downhill and giant slalom alpine skiing events for the 1952 Winter Olympics in Oslo.

Venue	Games	Sports	Capacity	Ref.
Nakiska	1988 Calgary	Alpine skiing, Freestyle skiing (demonstration)	Not listed.	
Norefjell	1952 Oslo	Alpine skiing (downhill, giant slalom)	Not listed	
National Speed Skating Oval	2022 Beijing	Speed skating	12,000	
Nozawa Onsen Ski Resort	1998 Nagano	Biathlon	20,000	

== O ==
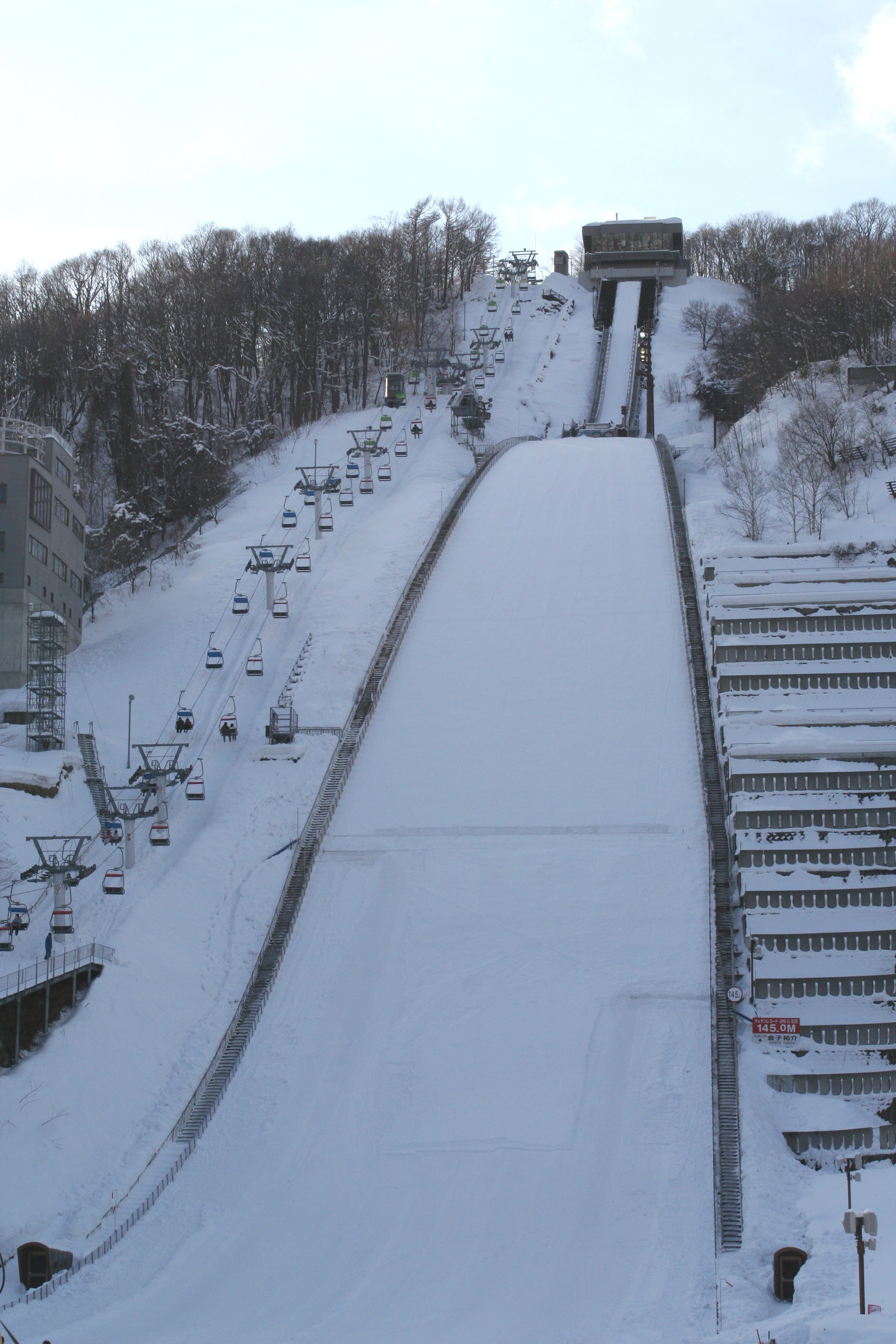
Okurayama Jumping Hill hosted the ski jumping large hill event for the 1972 Winter Olympics in Sapporo.

Venue	Games	Sports	Capacity	Ref.
Okurayama Jumping Hill	1972 Sapporo	Ski jumping (large hill)	50,000	
Olympia-Kunsteisstadion	1936 Garmisch-Partenkirchen	Figure skating, Ice hockey (final)	17,000	
Olympiahalle	1964 Innsbruck	Figure skating, Ice hockey	10.836	
Olympiahalle	1976 Innsbruck	Figure skating, Ice hockey (final)	Not listed.	
Olympiaschanze St. Moritz	1928 St. Moritz	Nordic combined (ski jumping), Ski jumping	Not listed.	
Olympiaschanze St. Moritz	1948 St. Moritz	Nordic combined (ski jumping), Ski jumping	Not listed.	
Olympic Arena	1932 Lake Placid	Figure skating, Ice hockey (final)	3360	
Olympic Center	1980 Lake Placid	Figure skating Ice hockey	8,500 (ice hockey); 2,000 (figure skating)	
Olympic Curling Centre	2014 Sochi	Curling	3,000	
Olympic Oval	1988 Calgary	Speed skating	4,000	
Olympic Oval	2014 Sochi	Speed skating	8,000	
Olympic Saddledome	1988 Calgary	Figure skating (final), Ice hockey (final)	16,605	
Sochi Olympic Skating Centre	2014 Sochi	Figure skating, Short track speed skating	12,000	
Olympic Stadium	1932 Lake Placid	Ice hockey, Speed skating	7475	
Olympic Stadium (Grenoble)	1968 Grenoble	Opening ceremonies	60,000	
Olympic Stadium	1948 St. Moritz	Figure skating, Ice hockey (final), Speed skating	Not listed.	
Oval Lingotto	2006 Turin	Speed skating	8,250	

== P ==
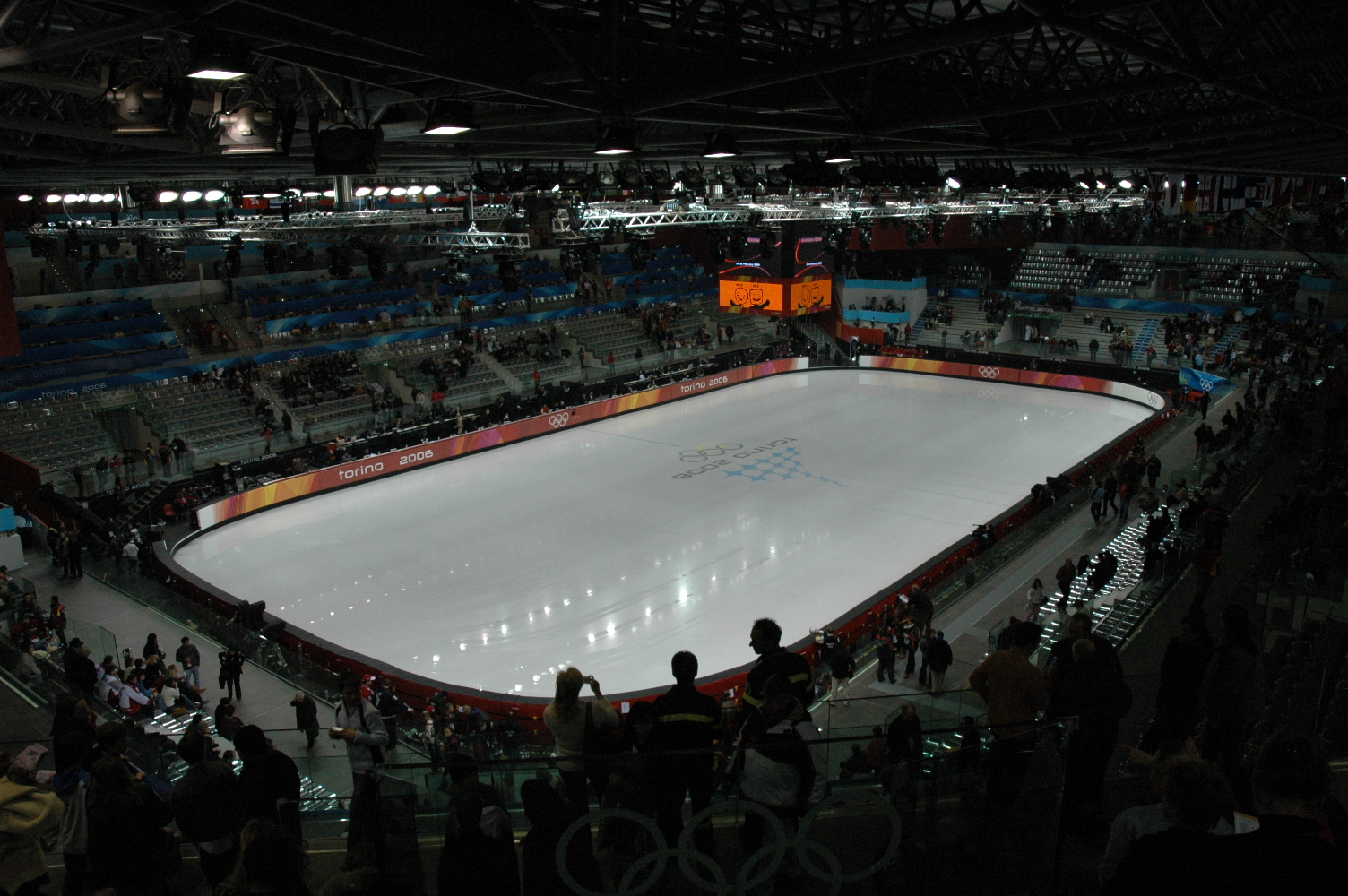
Torino Palavela during the 2006 Winter Olympics. The venue hosted the figure and short track speed skating events during those games.

Venue	Games	Sports	Capacity	Ref.
Pacific Coliseum	2010 Vancouver	Figure skating, Short track speed skating	14,239	
Palasport Olimpico	2006 Turin	Ice hockey (final)	12,500	
Palavela	2006 Turin	Figure skating, Short track speed skating	8,000	
Park City Mountain Resort	2002 Salt Lake City	Alpine skiing (giant slalom), Snowboarding	16,000	
Patscherkofel	1964 Innsbruck	Alpine skiing (men's downhill)	Not listed.	
Patscherkofel	1976 Innsbruck	Alpine skiing (men's downhill)	Not listed	
Peaks Ice Arena	2002 Salt Lake City	Ice hockey	8,400	
Pinerolo Palaghiaccio	2006 Turin	Curling	2,000	
Piste de Bobsleigh	1968 Grenoble	Bobsleigh	Not listed.	
Piste de Luge	1968 Grenoble	Luge	Not listed.	
Piz Nair	1948 St. Moritz	Alpine skiing	Not listed.	
Pragelato	2006 Turin	Nordic combined (ski jumping), Ski jumping	8,055	
Pragelato Plan	2006 Turin	Cross-country skiing, Nordic combined (cross-country skiing)	5,400	
Pralognan-la-Vanoise	1992 Albertville	Curling (demonstration)	Not listed.	

== Q ==
There are no venues that start with the letter 'Q'. This includes the 2014 Winter Olympics in Sochi.

== R ==
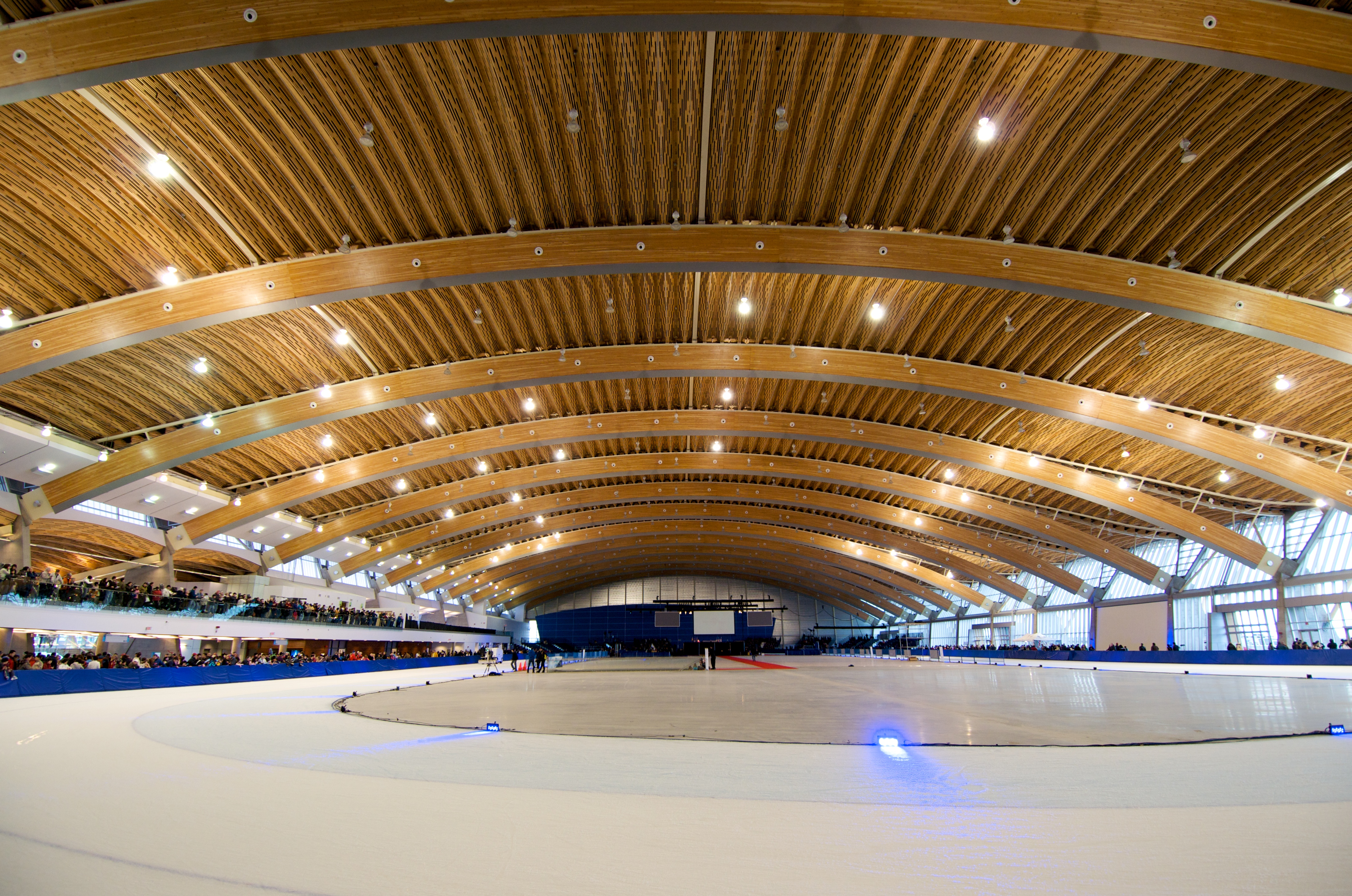
Interior of Richmond Olympic Oval, host of the speed skating events for the 2010 Winter Olympics held in neighboring Vancouver.

Venue	Games	Sports	Capacity	Ref.
Recoin de Chamrousse	1968 Grenoble	Alpine skiing (women)	Not listed.	
Rice-Eccles Olympic Stadium	2002 Salt Lake City	Ceremonies (opening/closing)	50,000	
Richmond Olympic Oval	2010 Vancouver	Speed skating	8,000	
Riessersee	1936 Garmisch-Partenkirchen	Bobsleigh, Ice hockey, Speed skating	17,940 (Bobsleigh), 16,000 (Ice hockey, Speed skating)	
Rødkleiva	1952 Oslo	Alpine skiing (slalom)	Not listed	
Rosa Khutor Alpine Resort	2014 Sochi	Alpine skiing	10,000	
Russian National Ski Jumping Centre	2014 Sochi	Nordic combined (ski jumping), Ski jumping	9,600	
Russian National Sliding Centre	2014 Sochi	Bobsleigh, Luge, Skeleton	9,000	
