= Nordlund =

Nordlund is a surname of Swedish origin which may refer to:

== People ==
- Barbro Hietala Nordlund (born 1946), Swedish Social Democratic politician
- Ingar Nordlund (1922–1998), Norwegian speed skater
- John Filip Nordlund (1875–1900), Swedish criminal
- Roger Nordlund (born 1957), Åland politician
- Solveig Nordlund (born 1943), Portuguese filmmaker
- Tina Nordlund (born 1977), Swedish footballer
- Willfred Nordlund (born 1988), Norwegian politician

== Other ==
- 6184 Nordlund, a main-belt Asteroid
- Camp Nordland, a resort in Andover, New Jersey
