= Figure skating at the 1952 Winter Olympics – Men's singles =

Men's singles at the VI Olympic Winter Games
- Venues: Jordal Amfi (compulsory figures); Bislett Stadion (free skate)
- Dates: 19-21 February 1952
- Competitors: 14 from 11 nations

Medalists
1st place, gold medalist(s)		Dick Button; United States
2nd place, silver medalist(s)		Hellmut Seibt; Austria
3rd place, bronze medalist(s)		James Grogan; United States

The men's figure skating competition at the 1952 Winter Olympics took place on 19 and 21 February at Jordal Amfi and Bislett stadion. The compulsory figures were held at Jordal Amfi, while the Free skating was contested at Bislett stadion. The ice surface at Bislett was set inside the oval created by the speed skating track. It was also an outdoor arena, which was used for the opening and closing ceremonies. There were no issues with the weather and the skating surface at Bislett was immaculate. Computers were used for the first time during the figure skating competitions to help tabulate the judges' marks and relay the results instantaneously.

17-year-old American Dick Button was the dominant force in men's international skating, having won the Olympic title in 1948, and the World Championships in 1948, 1949, 1950 and 1951. Only three men had come close to challenging him in the years since his first Olympic victory, teammates Hayes Jenkins and James Grogan, and Austrian Helmut Seibt, who had won the European Championships in 1951 and 1952. Button took a strong lead after the compulsory figures and just needed to skate safely in the free skating to earn his second gold medal. Instead he chose to perform the triple loop, which was the first triple jump ever performed in international competition. He executed the jump without error and finished his skate cleanly, he was awarded perfect marks by the judges and won his second Olympic gold medal.

The battle for second place was much closer and hotly contested between Hellmut Seibt and James Grogan. Seibt did well in the compulsories but faltered in the free skating. Grogan was third after the compulsories but could not overtake Seibt in the free skating. The final marks placed Seibt in second place by one-tenth of a point, the closest possible margin. Hayes Jenkins placed fourth and went on to win the gold medal at the 1956 Winter Olympics in Cortina d'Ampezzo, Italy. One week later Button, Grogan and Jenkins swept the World Championships. For Dick Button it was his fifth consecutive world title, and it also marked the end of his competitive skating career.

== Results ==
Here are the results of the men's figure skating competition.

Rank	Name	Nation	CF	FS	Points	Places
1	Dick Button	United States	1	1	192.256	9
2	Hellmut Seibt	Austria	2	5	180.144	23
3	James Grogan	United States	3	2	180.822	24
4	Hayes Alan Jenkins	United States	5	3	174.589	40
5	Peter Firstbrook	Canada	4	4	173.122	43
6	Carlo Fassi	Italy	6	7	169.822	50
7	Alain Giletti	France	7	6	163.233	63
8	Freimut Stein	Germany	8	8	155.956	72
9	François Pache	Switzerland	9	11	139.922	92
10	Adrian Swan	Australia	12	9	138.689	95
11	Kurt Oppelt	Austria	11	10	137.033	98
12	György Czakó	Hungary	14	12	132.233	112
13	Kalle Tuulos	Finland	13	13	131.211	112
14	Per Cock-Clausen	Denmark	10	11	133.722	112

Referee:

- (United Kingdom) Kenneth M. Beaumont

Assistant referee:

- (France) Georges Torchon

Judges:

- (United States) Alex Krupy
- (West Germany) Theo Klemm
- (Italy) Bruno Bonfiglio
- (Austria) Franz Wojtanowskyj
- (Denmark) Sven P. Sørensen
- (Canada) Norman V.S. Gregory
- (Finland) Martti Gyldén
- (France) Gérard Rodrigues Henriques
- (Hungary) László Szollás
