= Palka =

Pałka or Palka (meaning a stick in several Slavic languages) is a Polish surname that may refer to the following notable people:

- Daniel Palka (born 1991), American professional baseball outfielder
- Hermann Palka (1921–2004), Austrian bobsledder
- Julian Pałka (1923–2002), Polish poster artist
- Karina Lipiarska-Pałka (born 1987), Polish archer
- Krystyna Guzik (née Pałka in 1983), Polish biathlete
- Marianna Palka (born 1981), Scottish actress, producer, director, and writer
