= Gunnar Hallkvist =

Swedish speed skater (1919–2014)

Gunnar Hallkvist (10 January 1919 – 1 February 2014) was a Swedish speed skater who competed at the 1952 Winter Olympics in Oslo. Competing out of Eskilstuna IK, he finished twentieth out of thirty participants in the men's 10000 metres event. He was born in Eskilstuna and lived there until the age of 13, at which point he began displaying a talent in speed skating. He joined the national junior team at 17 and the senior squad in 1938, making his first international appearance at that year's European Speed Skating Championships for Men. He won three national championships during World War II and resumed international competition in 1949, attending that season's World Allround Speed Skating Championships for Men and retiring in 1953.
