= Spirit Mountain (ski area) =

Ski area in Duluth, Minnesota

Coordinates: 46°43′10″N 92°13′05″W

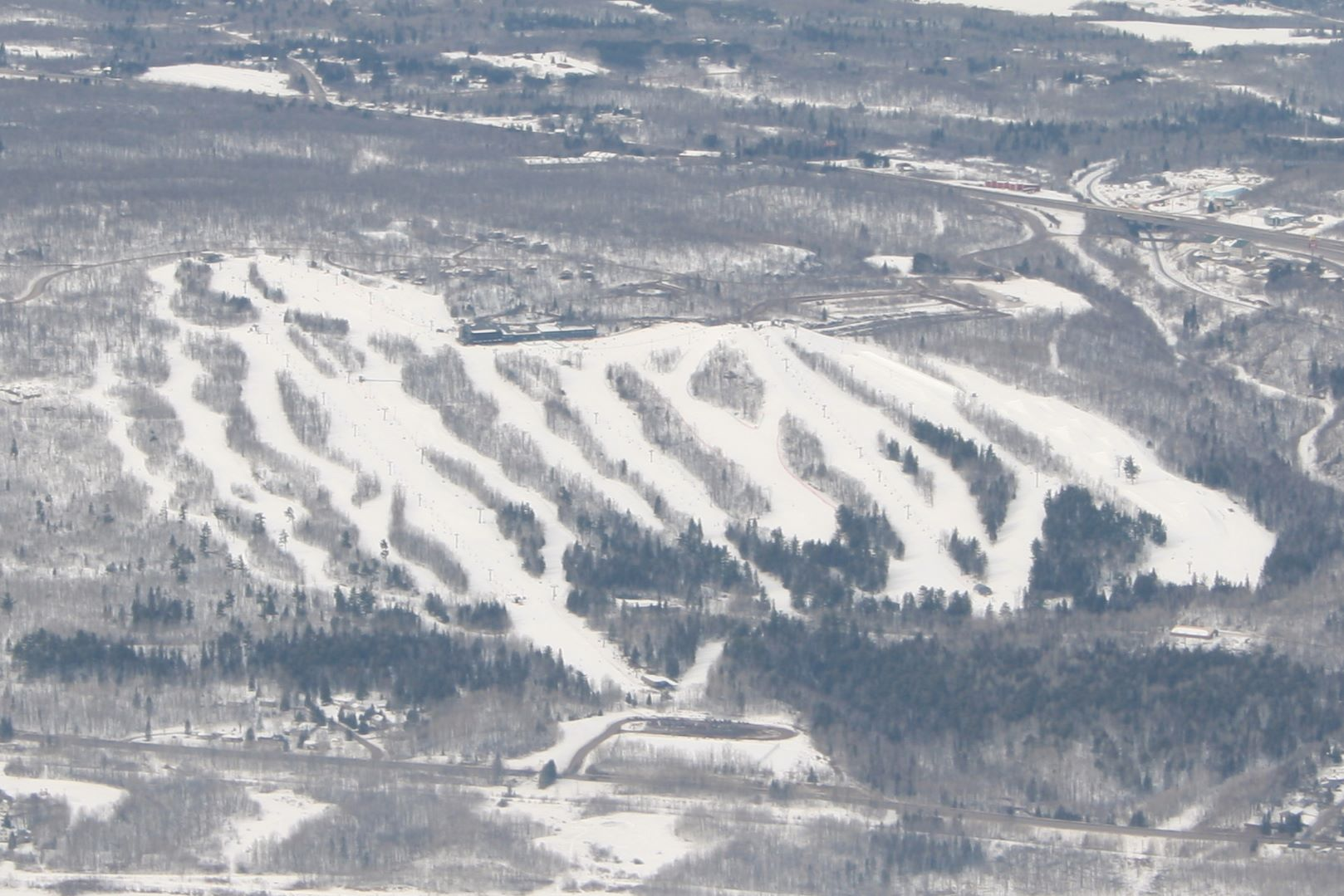
- Aerial view of Spirit Mountain.
- Interactive map of Spirit Mountain
- Location: Duluth, Minnesota
- Vertical: 678 ft (207 m)
- Top elevation: 1,298 ft (396 m)
- Base elevation: 620 ft (190 m)
- Skiable area: 175 acres (0.71 km^{2})
- Trails: 22 skiing, 12 downhill mountain biking
- Longest run: 5,400 feet (1,600 m)
- Lift system: 5 Chairlifts, 1 Ski Carpet, 1 Handle Tow, 1 Rope Tow
- Terrain parks: Large Big Air terrain park, Progression Park, Super Pipe, Bike park (summer), pump track (summer)
- Snowfall: 90 inches (average) / 138 inches (record)
- Snowmaking: Yes
- Night skiing: Yes
- Website: www.spiritmt.com

Spirit Mountain is a ski area in Duluth, Minnesota. It was founded by the City of Duluth and was built in 1974. With a vertical elevation of approximately 700 feet (210 m), it is the second tallest ski hill in Minnesota. Between 2014 and 2020, the executive director was Brandy Ream.

The Spirit Mountain ski area held its grand opening on December 19–20, 1974. The idea was proposed by former Olympian George Hovland, who laid out the cross country trails, with support from then Mayor of Duluth Ben Boo. Local businessman Manley Goldfine served as Chairman of the Spirit Mountain Authority during its development. It greatly increased winter revenues in the city. The extension of Interstate 35 stretching to Duluth was a major contributor to its initial success.

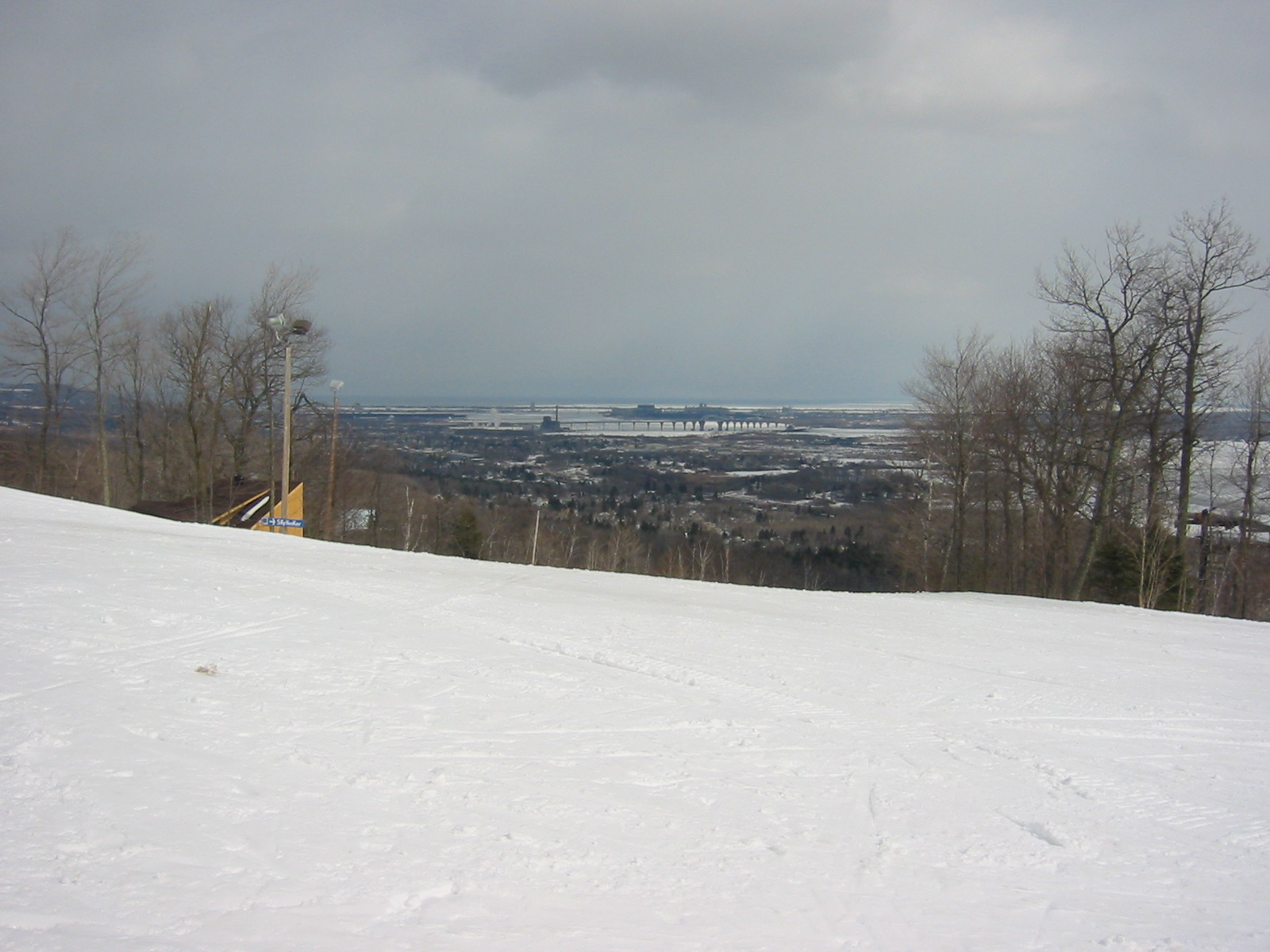
A view from the top of Spirit Mountain, looking northward to the St. Louis Bay.

Spirit Mountain is known for having a large terrain park. The park includes jumps ranging from 15 feet (4.6 m) to over 60 feet (18 m), and numerous rails, boxes, and other "jibs".

In the 21st century, Spirit Mountain has been renovating and adding to its infrastructure and attractions. An alpine coaster opened in 2010. In April 2011 they announced plans to add a zip line, miniature golf, and snow tubing to expand operations and attract more visitors in summer. In 2012 the hill's original high-speed chairlift, the Spirit Express, was replaced with the Spirit Express II, and work began on downhill mountain bike trails during the following summer. A chalet on Grand Avenue at the bottom of the slope opened in 2013 and serves as the starting point for the Grand Avenue Nordic Center, which opened 2.5 km of Nordic ski trails in 2018. Additional improvements planned over the next ten years include chalet renovations, chair lift replacements, as well as RFID ‘pass inspection’ towers placed at the bottom of the most frequently trafficked chairlifts. Donations were requested before the 2023-2024 winter season, however these have yet to be installed. ‘Senior pass’ age requirements were adjusted from 62 years of age to 80 during the same season.
