= Yoshiyasu Gomi =

Japanese speed skater (born 1933)

Personal information
- Nationality: Japanese
- Born: April 25, 1933 (age 93) Nagano Prefecture, Empire of Japan
- Education: Waseda University

Sport
- Sport: Speed skating

Yoshiyasu Gomi (五味 芳保, Gomi Yoshiyasu; born 25 April 1933) is a Japanese former speed skater who competed in the 1952 and 1956 Winter Olympics.

He was born in Nagano Prefecture.

In 1952 he finished tenth in the 5000 metres competition and 14th in the 10000 metres event.

Four years later he finished 23rd in the 10000 metres contest, 27th in the 5000 metres competition, and 39th in the 1500 metres event at the 1956 Games.
