= Wiggo Hanssen =

Norwegian speed skater

Wiggo Kay Hanssen (17 July 1923 – 13 December 2007) was a Norwegian speed skater who competed in the 1952 Winter Olympics. He was born in Tromøy Municipality and died in Arendal Municipality.

In 1952 he finished ninth in the 5000 metres competition.
