= Lennart Sandin =

Swedish bobsledder

Lennart Sandin (November 26, 1919 – June 5, 1991) was a Swedish bobsledder who competed in the early 1950s. He finished seventh in the four-man event at the 1952 Winter Olympics in Oslo.
