= Michele Alverà =

Italian bobsledder (1929–1991)

Michele Alverà (September 5, 1929 – July 18, 1991) was an Italian bobsledder who competed during the early 1950s. He finished 14th in the four-man event at the 1952 Winter Olympics in Oslo.
