= Börje Ekedahl =

Swedish bobsledder

Börje Ekedahl (August 21, 1928 – January 5, 2006) was a Swedish bobsledder who competed in the early 1950s. He finished seventh in the four-man event at the 1952 Winter Olympics in Oslo.
