= Carlos Sareisian =

Argentine bobsledder (born 1916)

Carlos Sareisian (born 3 January 1916, date of death unknown) was an Argentine bobsledder who competed in the early 1950s. He finished eighth in the four-man event at the 1952 Winter Olympics in Oslo.
