= Sandro Rasini =

Italian bobsledder (1918–2006)

Alessandro Rasini (25 November 1918 – 3 September 2006) was an Italian bobsledder who competed in the early 1950s. He finished ninth in the four-man event at the 1952 Winter Olympics in Oslo. He was born in Milan in 1918 and died in Trieste in 2006.
