= Hans Senger =

Austrian alpine skier (1925–2004)

Personal information
- Nationality: Austrian
- Born: 25 May 1925 Bad Gastein, Austria
- Died: 11 May 2004 (aged 78) Spittal an der Drau, Austria

Sport
- Sport: Alpine skiing

Hans Senger (25 May 1925 – 11 May 2004) was an Austrian alpine skier. He competed in two events at the 1952 Winter Olympics.
