= George Hovland =

American cross-country skier (1926–2021)

George Hovland, Jr. (June 10, 1926 – May 9, 2021) was an American cross-country skier who had been competing since the 1950s. He represented the United States at the 1952 Winter Olympics in Oslo. Hovland was a four-time Central USSA four-event champion (jumping, cross-country, slalom, and downhill) and completed every American Birkebeiner, with the exception of the first one, until 2012, completing his 33rd at age 85. He was the age group winner approximately twelve times. He was the age group champion for National Alpine NASTAR seven times and was the first non-European to complete the Swedish 90 kilometer Vasaloppet. Hovland was first came up with the idea for the Spirit Mountain Ski Area; he was also involved with Snowflake Nordic Ski Center in Duluth, Minnesota, and the Northshore Inline Marathon. He also owned the Ski Kenwood (Duluth) and Mont du Lac (Wisconsin) ski areas.
