= Leopold Kohl =

Austrian Nordic combined skier (1930–2010)

Leopold Kohl (21 March 1930 – July 2010) was an Austrian Nordic combined skier who competed in the 1952, 1956, and 1964 Winter Olympics. His best finish occurred at Cortina d'Ampezzo in 1956 where Kohl finished 17th in the Nordic combined event. Kohl also competed in cross-country skiing, finishing 51st in the 18 km event at Oslo in 1952.
