= Maurice R. Severino =

American bobsledder (1919–2005)

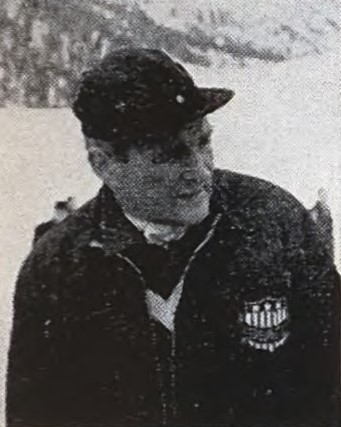
Air Force Reserve Captain Dick Severino in 1954

Maurice Richard "Dick" Severino (November 17, 1919 – August 28, 2005) was an American bobsledder who competed in the 1950s. He finished ninth in the four-man event at the 1952 Winter Olympics in Oslo.

Severino also served in the United States Army Air Forces during World War II and then in the United States Air Force Reserve, rising to the rank of colonel. Born in New York City and raised in Saratoga Springs, New York, he graduated from Saratoga Springs High School and then attended Cornell University, playing football for both. When the United States entered World War II, Severino enlisted as an Army aviation cadet. He earned his bachelor's degree in engineering in 1942 and his officer's commission in October 1943. Severino then served thirteen months in Guam with the 315th Bombardment Wing. He was released from active duty in August 1946.

During the Korean War, Severino was recalled to active duty in the Air Force in May 1951. Sent to Europe, he was able to participate in the 1952 Winter Olympic games. He was later selected as pilot of the No. 2 United States four-man sled for the 1958 World Championships in Garmisch-Partenkirchen, West Germany. In total, he piloted U.S. two- and four-man sleds six times in World Championship events.

In later life, Severino became a golf journalist and photographer. He died at Albany Medical Center after suffering a stroke.
