= Theodore A. Farwell =

American Nordic combined skier

Theodore Austin "Ted" Farwell, Jr. (January 1, 1931 - January 25, 2015) was an American Nordic skier who competed in the 1950s. At the 1952 Winter Olympics, he finished 11th in the Nordic combined event and 43rd in the 18 km cross-country skiing event. Farwell also competed at the 1956 and 1960 Winter Olympics.

Farwell started skiing when he was 2 years old and later organized his high school ski team and skied for Syracuse University. After moving to Colorado, he excelled in Nordic combined and cross-country skiing and skied for the Steamboat Springs Winter Sports Club and Denver University in the 1950s. Farwell placed 11th in the Nordic combined at the Olympic games in Oslo, Norway. Farwell held the record as the highest finish for a native-born American until Todd Lodwick placed 7th in Nordic combined at the Salt Lake City Olympics in 2002.

Farwell was inducted into the Colorado Ski and Snowboard Hall of Fame in 1992. Farwell is also a member of the National Ski and Snowboard Hall of Fame.

Farwell graduated from Denver University and earned an MBA from Stanford University. He later became a planner and consultant to ski area developers, conducted the first economic study of the ski industry, and developed the procedures for the Annual Economic Analysis of North American Ski Areas.
