= Peter Radacher =

Austrian cross-country skier

Peter Radacher (born 9 March 1930) is an Austrian Nordic skier who competed in the 1950s. He competed both in the Nordic combined event and 18 km cross-country skiing events at the 1952 Winter Olympics in Oslo, but did not finish either one.
