= Joseph Scott (bobsleigh) =

American bobsledder

Robert Joseph Scott (August 31, 1922 – October 16, 2000) was an American bobsledder who competed in the early 1950s. He finished ninth in the four-man event at the 1952 Winter Olympics in Oslo.
