= Imogene Opton =

American alpine skier (born 1932)

Personal information
- Nationality: American
- Born: April 25, 1932 (age 92); Berlin, Germany

Sport
- Sport: Alpine skiing

Imogene Opton (born April 25, 1932) is an American alpine skier. She competed in two events at the 1952 Winter Olympics.
