= Brooks Dodge =

American alpine skier (1929–2018)

Personal information
- Born: December 30, 1929; Conway, New Hampshire, United States
- Died: January 17, 2018 (aged 88)

Sport
- Sport: Alpine skiing

Brooks Dodge (December 30, 1929 – January 17, 2018) was an American alpine skier. He competed at the 1952 Winter Olympics and the 1956 Winter Olympics. He graduated from Dartmouth College and Harvard Business School.

During his Olympic career, he helped develop innovations in tighter ski wear and in safer bindings for racers. In the 1950s, Dodge was part of a team that started the development of the Wildcat Mountain Ski Area, laying out and cutting some of the original trails.
