= James Grogan =

American figure skater

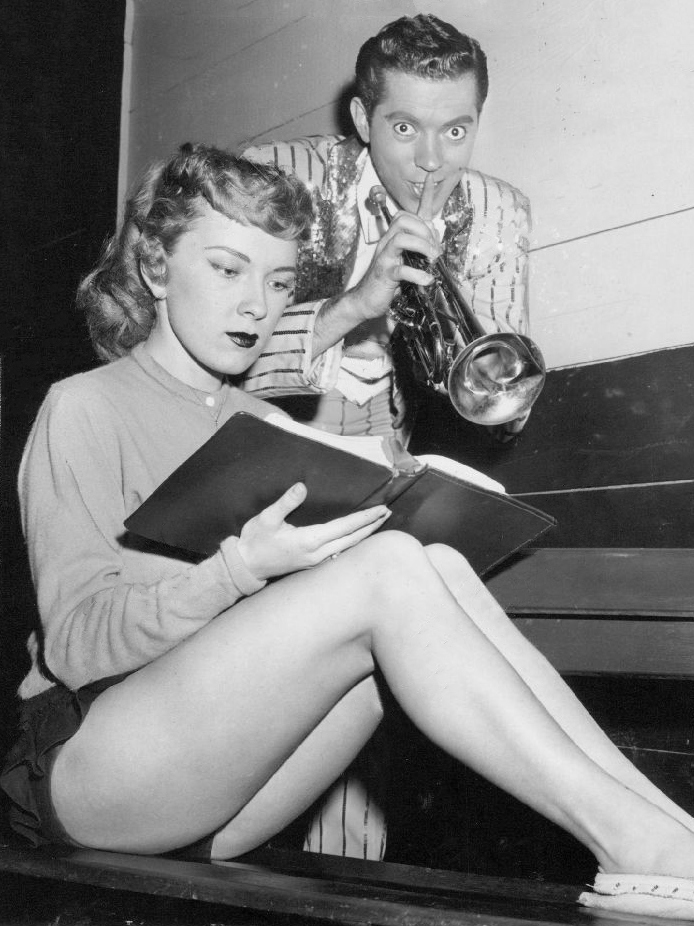
- Grogan in 1958

Personal information
- Born: December 7, 1931 Tacoma, Washington, U.S.
- Died: July 3, 2000 (aged 68) San Bernardino, California, U.S.

Figure skating career
- Country: United States
- Discipline: Men's singles
- Skating club: St. Moritz Figure Skating Club
Medal record
Olympic Games
Bronze medal – third place	1952 Oslo	Singles
World Championships
Silver medal – second place	1954 Oslo	Singles
Silver medal – second place	1953 Davos	Singles
Silver medal – second place	1952 Paris	Singles
Silver medal – second place	1951 Milan	Singles
North American Championships
Silver medal – second place	1951 Calgary	Singles
Silver medal – second place	1949 Philadelphia	Singles
Silver medal – second place	1947 Ottawa	Singles

James David "Jim" Grogan (December 7, 1931 – July 3, 2000) was an American figure skater who won a bronze medal at the 1952 Oslo Olympics. He also won four silver medals at the United States Figure Skating Championships and at the World Figure Skating Championships. During his competitive career, he was coached by Edi Scholdan at the Broadmoor World Arena in Colorado Springs, Colorado.

After turning professional, he performed in Arthur Wirtz's Hollywood Ice Revue, with Sonja Henie's European tour, and later in Ice Capades before taking up coaching. He founded a skating school at Squaw Valley and coached at the Ice Castle International Training Center in Lake Arrowhead, California for many years. He was inducted into the United States Figure Skating Hall of Fame in 1991.

Grogan was born in Tacoma, Washington. He was married to 1960 Olympic pair champion Barbara Wagner, but they later divorced. He then married Yasuko Grogan. He had two children. He died suddenly of multiple organ failure on July 3, 2000, in San Bernardino, California.

== Competitive highlights ==
Event	1947	1948	1949	1950	1951	1952	1953	1954
Winter Olympics		6th				3rd		
World Championships		5th	4th		2nd	2nd	2nd	2nd
North American Championships	2nd		2nd		2nd			
U.S. Championships	3rd	2nd	2nd		2nd	2nd		
