= Karl Wagner (bobsleigh) =

Austrian bobsledder (1907–1959)

- Born: 9 May 1907; Schottwien, Austria-Hungary
- Died: 15 October 1959 (aged 52); Neunkirchen, Austria

Karl Wagner (9 May 1907 – 15 October 1959) was an Austrian bobsledder who competed in the 1950s. Competing in two Winter Olympics, he earned his best finish of fifth in the four-man event at Oslo in 1952.
