= Thomas M. Jacobs =

American Nordic skier

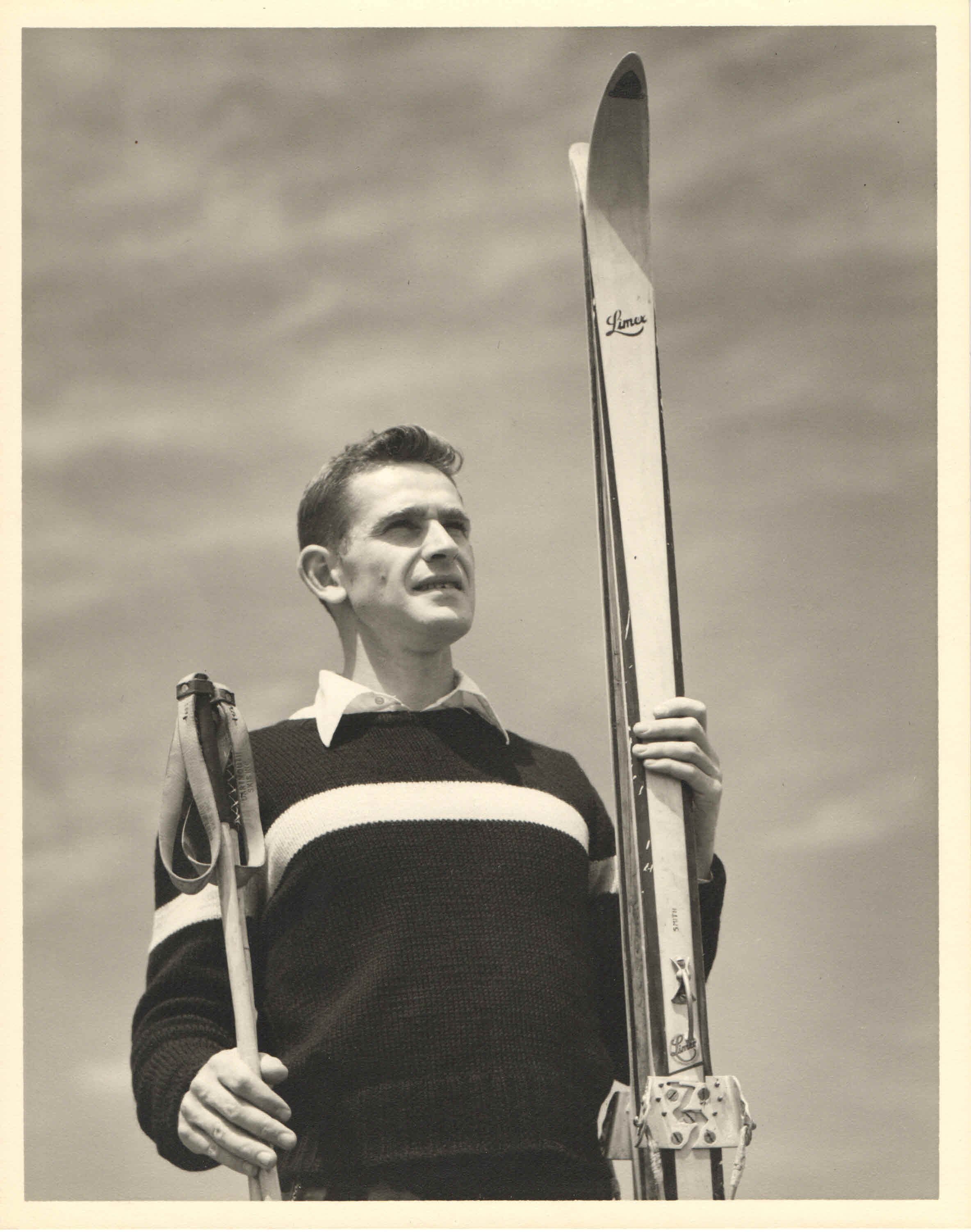

Thomas Michael Jacobs (August 14, 1926 – April 10, 2014) was an American Olympic Nordic skier who competed in the 1950s. He was educated at Middlebury College in Vermont, and was a member of the college's ski team.

Jacobs competed at the 1952 Winter Olympics in Oslo, where he finished 21st in the Nordic combined event and 66th in the 18 km cross-country skiing event. In 1953, he became the first full-time ski coach at the University of Colorado Boulder, where he built the team into a national powerhouse and hired future U.S. Ski Team head coach Bob Beattie, whose 1959 Colorado team won the NCAA championship.

After competing in the Olympics, Jacobs founded the Inside Edge Ski & Bike Shop in Glens Falls, New York, one of the only Nordic skiing equipment stores in the United States. He also started a direct-supply and mail-order business, incorporated as Reliable Racing Supplies in 1969, which was the first in New York to import European bicycles, and distributed the Techniski snowless ski, which he demonstrated in New York's Central Park. Jacobs and his wife Marilyn retired from the skiing and cycling business in 2004, and left the running of the business to their youngest son, John Jacobs. On January 31, 2008, Thomas Jacobs was inducted into the U.S. National Ski and Snowboard Hall of Fame.
