= Franz Eckhardt =

Austrian bobsledder

Franz Eckhardt (6 August 1927 – 5 October 2011) was an Austrian bobsledder who competed in the early 1950s. At the 1952 Winter Olympics, he finished fifth in the four-man event and ninth in the two-man event.
