= Ossi Reichert =

German alpine skier

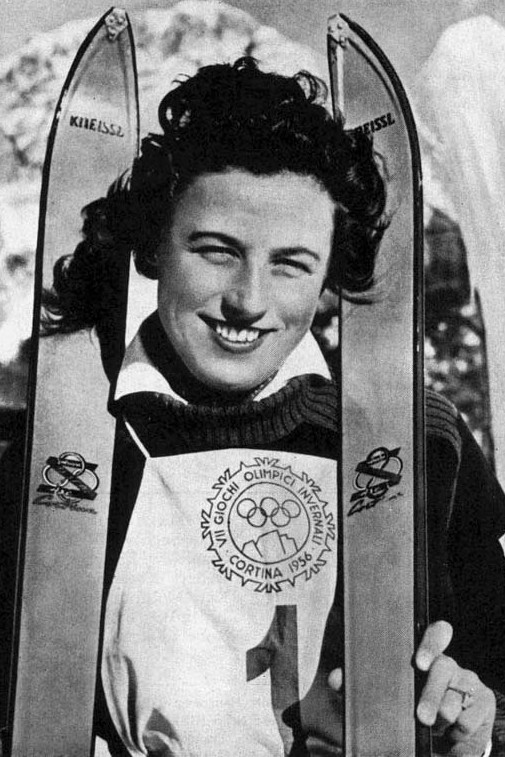
- Reichert at the 1956 Olympics

Personal information
- Born: 25 December 1925 Gunzesried, Germany
- Died: 16 July 2006 (aged 80) Gunzesried, Germany

Sport
- Sport: Alpine skiing
- Club: SC Sonthofen
Medal record
Olympic Games
Representing Germany (GER)
Silver medal – second place	1952 Oslo	Slalom
Representing Germany (EUA)
Gold medal – first place	1956 Cortina d'Ampezzo	Giant slalom

Rosa "Ossi" Reichert (25 December 1925 – 16 July 2006) was a German alpine skier. Her greatest victory was in the 1956 Winter Olympics giant slalom at Cortina d'Ampezzo, Germany's sole gold medal at these games (and Germany's first gold medal in Olympics after the Second World War). After having seriously injured an ankle in 1954, she was not expected to do well at these games. She also drew the #1 start position for the one-run event. Josefa „Putzi“ Frandl, who won the silver medal in the event, once stated that, "Ossi was disappointed to draw #1 as that was usually not a good position. The first racer down the course usually has to scrape off a bit of snow, which slows you down. But Ossi had a great run and overcame that difficulty."

Reichert also participated in the 1952 Winter Olympics in Oslo, where she won a silver medal in the slalom, beating her fellow German Annemarie Buchner for the bronze medal. Domestically Reichert won three German titles in 1956, in the slalom, giant slalom and combined events. She retired the same year to run the hotel of her parents in her home town the Allgäu region.
