= Edmée Abetel =

Swiss alpine skier (1922–2002)

Personal information
- Nationality: Swiss
- Born: 26 November 1922; Lausanne, Switzerland
- Died: 14 April 2002 (aged 79); Lausanne, Switzerland

Sport
- Sport: Alpine skiing

Edmée Abetel-Barré (26 November 1922 – 14 April 2002) was a Swiss alpine skier. She competed in the 1952 Winter Olympics.
