= Rosi Sailer =

Austrian alpine skier (1931–2026)

Personal information
- Nationality: Austrian
- Born: 20 August 1931 (age 95) Kitzbühel, Austria

Sport
- Sport: Alpine skiing

Rosi Sailer (20 August 1931 – 26 May 2026) was an Austrian alpine skier. She competed in the women's slalom at the 1952 Winter Olympics. She died on 26 May 2026, at the age of 94.
