= André Filippini =

Swiss bobsledder (1924–2013)

Olympic medal record

Men's Bobsleigh
Bronze medal – third place	1952 Oslo	Four-man

André Filippini (13 September 1924 – 19 November 2013) was a Swiss bobsledder who competed in the early 1950s. He won a bronze medal in the four-man event at the 1952 Winter Olympics in Oslo.

Filippini was also a businessman and was at the centre of the Savro Affair, a financial and political scandal in the late 1970s.

He was president of FC Sion from 1971 to 1977.
