= Heinz Hoppichler =

Austrian bobsledder

Heinz Hoppichler (27 September 1905 – 10 July 1968) was an Austrian bobsledder who competed in the early 1950s. At the 1952 Winter Olympics in Oslo, he finished 16th in the two-man event and did not finish the four-man event.
