= Ingar Nordlund =

Norwegian speed skater

Personal information
- Nationality: Norwegian
- Born: 17 April 1922; Jevnaker
- Died: 18 December 1998 (aged 76)

Sport
- Sport: Speed skating

Ingar Andreas Nordlund Andreassen (17 April 1922 – 18 December 1998) was a Norwegian speed skater, born in Jevnaker. He competed in 10,000 m at the 1952 Winter Olympics in Oslo.
