= John Werket =

American speed skater (1924–2010)

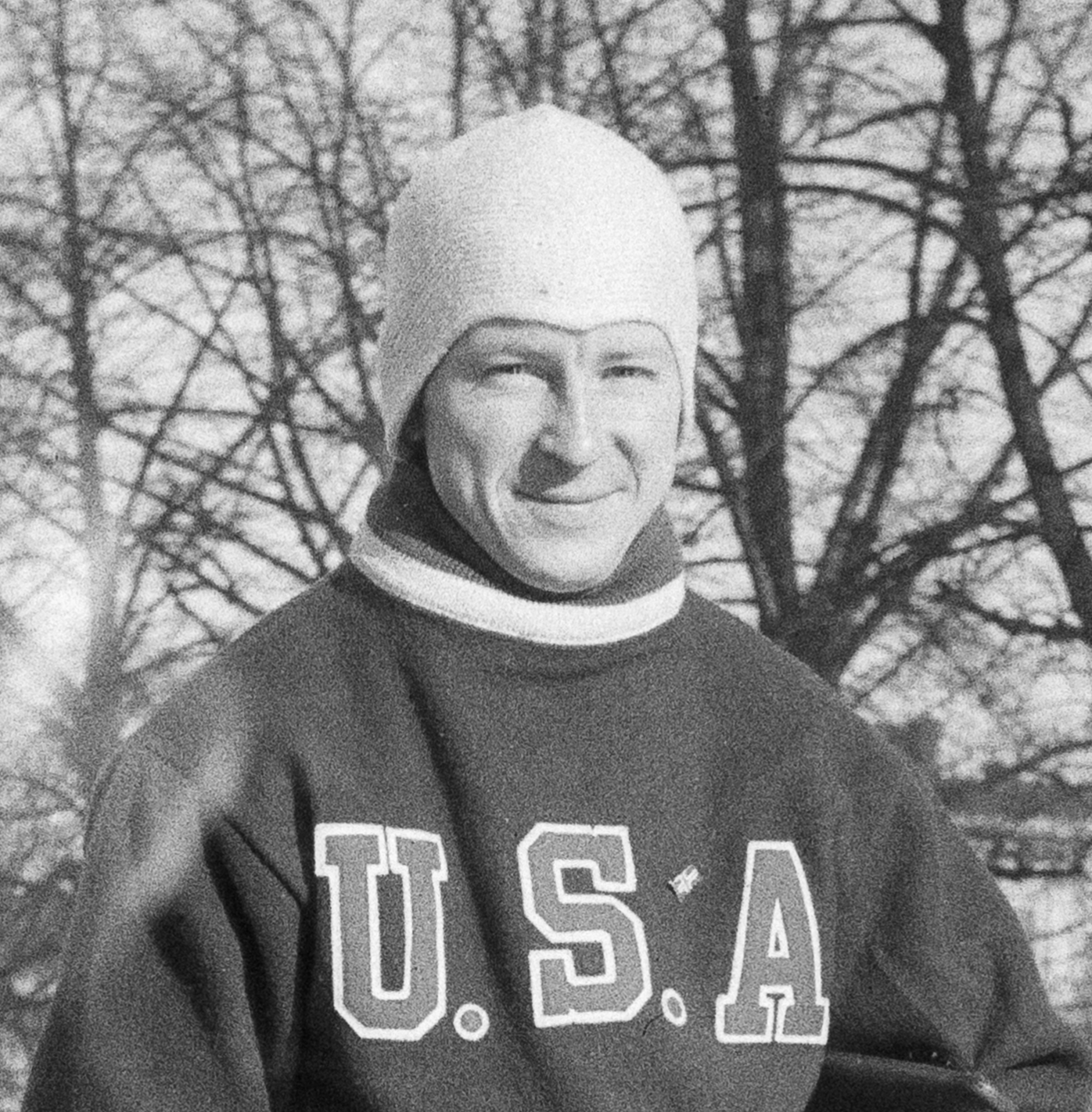
- Johnny Werket in 1948

Personal information
- Born: October 8, 1924 Saint Paul, Minnesota, United States
- Died: June 4, 2010 (aged 85) Sun City West, Arizona, United States
- Education: Augsburg
- Height: 5'5
- Weight: 130

Sport
- Sport: Speed skating
- Club: Lawrence Wennell Powderhorn Skating Club
Medal record
Representing the United States
World championships
Silver medal – second place	1948 Helsinki	Allround
Bronze medal – third place	1950 Eskilstuna	Allround

John Roland Werket (October 8, 1924, – June 4, 2010) was an American speed skater. He competed in seven events in total at the 1948, 1952 and 1956 Winter Olympics with the best achievement of sixth place in the 1500 m in 1948. In 1948, he also won the 1500 m event and a silver allround medal at the world championships. This was the best achievement for an American skater, surpassed only in 1977 by Eric Heiden. In 1950, Werket finished in third place allround, but won the 500 m and 1,500 m events. In 1952, he finished second in the 500 m and 1,500 m and tenth overall.

After graduating from Roosevelt High School in Minneapolis, he enlisted as paratrooper with the 101st Airborne Division and fought in World War II. He then graduated from Augsburg College in 1949. Werket was of Norwegian descent. While competing in Hamar, Norway, he met Vesla Bekkevoll, then aged 16, and married her on August 17, 1951 in Minneapolis. He retired from competitions after the 1952 World Championships and coached skating, first at the Richfield Skating Club, and then with the US national team, preparing it to the 1972 Winter Olympics. His trainees included Diane Holum and Eric Heiden. In parallel he worked at the Northern States Power Company and eventually advanced to an executive position. He retired in 1983 after 32 years with the Northern States Power and settled in Sun City, Arizona, where he died in 2010 of stroke and cancer complications. He was survived by his wife and two sons, John and Jim.

Personal bests:

- 500 m – 42.0 (1956)
- 1500 m – 2:16.1 (1956)
- 5000 m – 8:44.6 (1950)
- 10000 m – 18:10.2 (1950)
