= Wilfried Thurner =

Austrian bobsledder

Wilfried Thurner (27 December 1927 – 28 September 1981) was an Austrian bobsledder who competed in the 1950s. Competing in two Winter Olympics, he earned his best finish of seventh in the four-man event at Cortina d'Ampezzo in 1956.
