= Kurt Loserth =

Austrian bobsledder

Kurt Loserth (26 November 1914 – 10 September 1997) was an Austrian bobsledder who competed during the 1950s. Competing in two Winter Olympics, he earned his best finish of seventh in the four-man event at Cortina d'Ampezzo in 1956.
