= Schottwien =

- Municipality
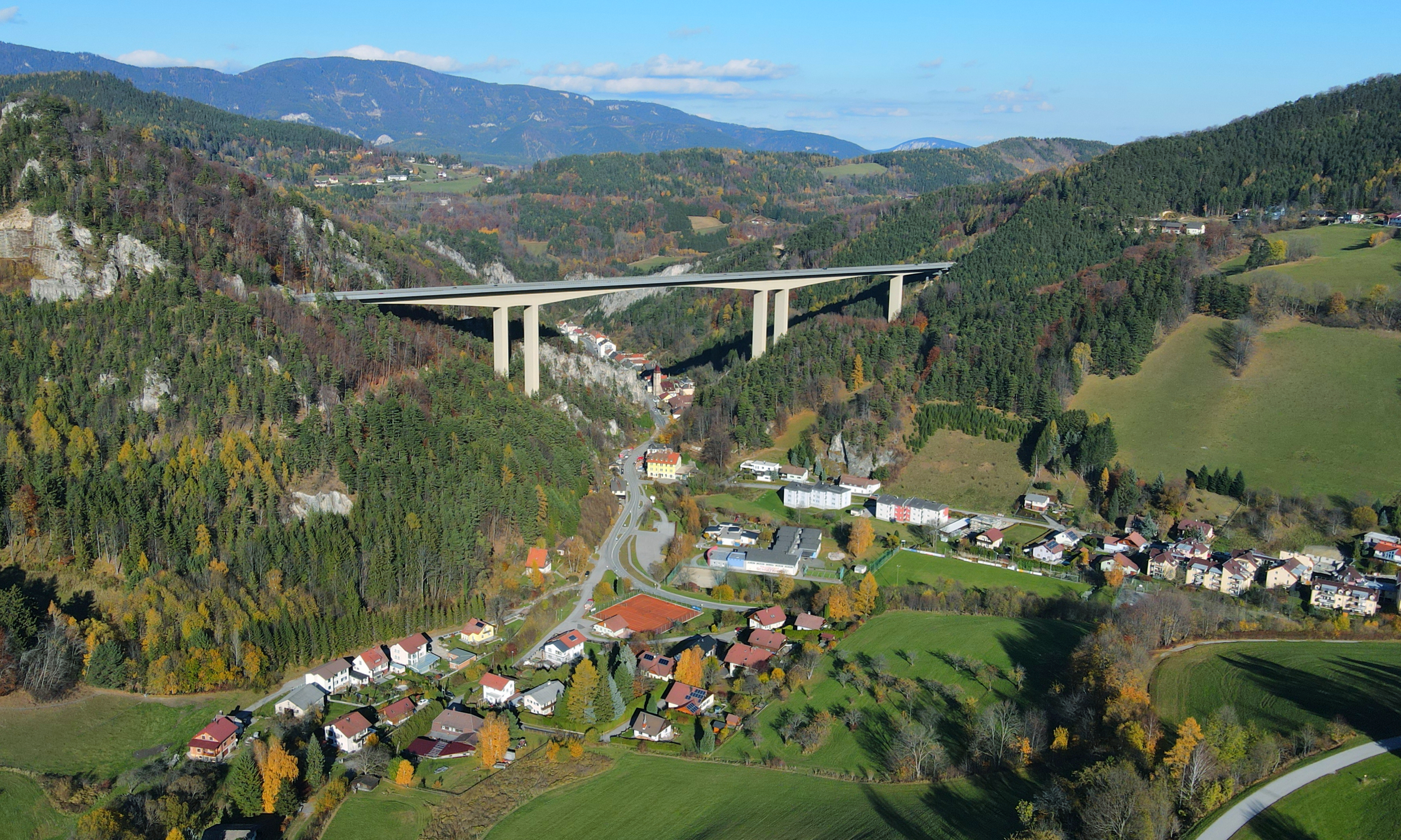
- Southwest view of Schottwien

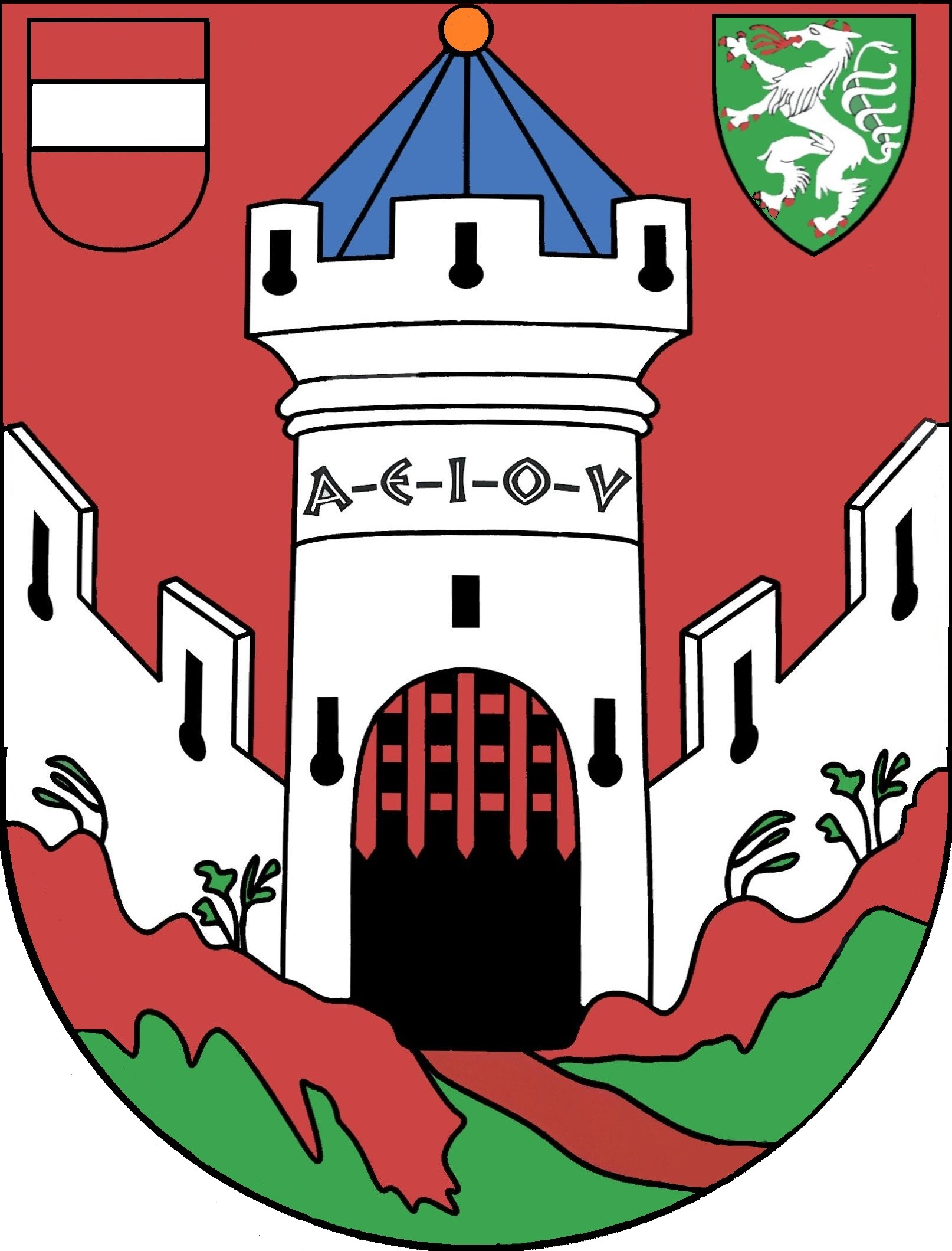
- Coat of arms

- Location within Austria
- Coordinates: 47°38′N 15°52′E
- Country: Austria
- State: Lower Austria
- District: Neunkirchen

Government
  - Mayor: Wolfgang Ruzicka

Area
  - Total: 12.52 km^{2} (4.83 sq mi)
- Elevation: 569 m (1,867 ft)

Population (2018-01-01)
  - Total: 660
  - Density: 53/km^{2} (140/sq mi)
- Time zone: UTC+1 (CET)
  - Summer (DST): UTC+2 (CEST)
- Postal code: 2641
- Area code: 02663

Schottwien is a town in the district of Neunkirchen in the Austrian state of Lower Austria.

== Population ==
Historical population
Year	Pop.	±%
1869	838	—
1880	935	+11.6%
1890	1,104	+18.1%
1900	1,166	+5.6%
1910	1,158	−0.7%
1923	1,127	−2.7%
1934	1,137	+0.9%
1939	1,009	−11.3%
1951	921	−8.7%
1961	860	−6.6%
1971	895	+4.1%
1981	744	−16.9%
1991	685	−7.9%
2001	714	+4.2%
2011	714	+0.0%
