= Franz Kneissl =

Austrian bobsledder

Franz Kneissl (29 July 1921 – 24 May 1994) was an Austrian bobsledder who competed during the 1950s. He competed at the 1952 Winter Olympics in Oslo in the four-man event, but did not finish.
