= Hermann Palka =

Austrian bobsledder (1921–2004)

Hermann Palka (21 March 1921 – 9 March 2004) was an Austrian bobsledder who competed in the early 1950s. At the 1952 Winter Olympics in Oslo, he finished fifth in the four-man event. He was born in Schottwien in 1921, and died in Wiener Neustadt in 2004.
