= Alpine skiing at the 1952 Winter Olympics =

Alpine skiing at the VI Olympic Winter Games
- Venue: Norefjell in Krødsherad, Buskerud; Rødkleiva (slalom) in Oslo, Norway
- Dates: 14–20 February 1952
- Competitors: 166 from 28 nations

Location in Norway
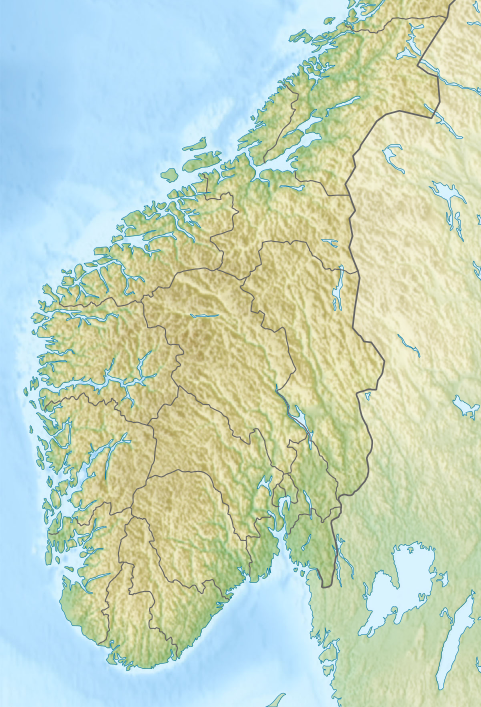
Locations in southern Norway

At the 1952 Winter Olympics in Oslo, Norway, the six alpine skiing events were held from Thursday, 14 February, to Wednesday, 20 February. The downhill and giant slalom events were held at Norefjell in Krødsherad, Buskerud, and the slalom events at Rødkleiva in Oslo.

The giant slalom made its Olympic debut, and the combined event was dropped as an Olympic medal event for four decades, until 1988. It returned as a medal event at the World Championships two years later in 1954, and for the concurrent World Championships in Olympic years from 1956 through 1980. For fourteen World Championships (1954–1980), the combined was a "paper race," using the results from the three events (and required the completion of each).

== Medal summary ==
=== Men's events ===
Event	Gold		Silver		Bronze	
Downhill	Zeno Colò; Italy	2:30.8	Othmar Schneider; Austria	2:32.0	Christian Pravda; Austria	2:32.4
Giant slalom	Stein Eriksen; Norway	2:25.0	Christian Pravda; Austria	2:26.9	Toni Spiß; Austria	2:28.8
Slalom	Othmar Schneider; Austria	2:00.0	Stein Eriksen; Norway	2:01.2	Guttorm Berge; Norway	2:01.7

=== Women's events ===
Event	Gold		Silver		Bronze	
Downhill	Trude Jochum-Beiser; Austria	1:47.1	Annemarie Buchner; Germany	1:48.0	Giuliana Minuzzo; Italy	1:49.0
Giant slalom	Andrea Mead Lawrence; United States	2:06.8	Dagmar Rom; Austria	2:09.0	Annemarie Buchner; Germany	2:10.0
Slalom	Andrea Mead Lawrence; United States	2:10.6	Ossi Reichert; Germany	2:11.4	Annemarie Buchner; Germany	2:13.3

=== Medal table ===
Rank	Nation	Gold	Silver	Bronze	Total
1	Austria	2	3	2	7
2	United States	2	0	0	2
3	Norway	1	1	1	3
4	Italy	1	0	1	2
5	Germany	0	2	2	4
Totals (5 entries)		6	6	6	18

== Course information ==
Date	Race	Start elevation	Finish elevation	Vertical drop	Course length	Average gradient
Sat 16-Feb	Downhill – men	940 m (3,084 ft)	190 m (623 ft)	750 m (2,461 ft)	2.600 km (1.616 mi)	28.8%
Sun 17-Feb	Downhill – women	710 m (2,329 ft)	325 m (1,066 ft)	385 m (1,263 ft)	1.350 km (0.839 mi)	28.5%
Fri 15-Feb	Giant slalom – men	675 m (2,215 ft)	190 m (623 ft)	485 m (1,591 ft)	1.750 km (1.087 mi)	27.7%
Thu 14-Feb	Giant slalom – women	710 m (2,329 ft)	375 m (1,230 ft)	335 m (1,099 ft)	1.200 km (0.746 mi)	27.9%
Tue 19-Feb	Slalom – men	479 m (1,572 ft)	310 m (1,017 ft)	169 m (554 ft)	0.422 km (0.262 mi)	40.0%
Wed 20-Feb	Slalom – women	479 m (1,572 ft)	310 m (1,017 ft)	169 m (554 ft)	0.422 km (0.262 mi)	40.0%

== Participating nations ==
Twenty-eight nations sent alpine skiers to compete in the events in Oslo.

- Argentina (8)
- Australia (3)
- Austria (12)
- Belgium (2)
- Bulgaria (5)
- Canada (10)
- Chile (3)
- Finland (4)
- France (8)
- Germany (11)
- Great Britain (7)
- Greece (3)
- Hungary (2)
- Iceland (4)
- Italy (10)
- Japan (2)
- Lebanon (1)
- Netherlands (3)
- New Zealand (3)
- Norway (12)
- Poland (9)
- Portugal (1)
- Romania (7)
- Spain (4)
- Sweden (9)
- Switzerland (12)
- United States (12)
- Yugoslavia (3)
