= Howard Crossett =

American bobsledder (1918–1968)

Olympic medal record

Bobsleigh
Silver medal – second place	1952 Oslo	Four-man

Howard Wallace Crossett (July 22, 1918 – June 30, 1968) was an American bobsledder who competed in the early 1950s. He won a silver medal in the four-man event at the 1952 Winter Olympics in Oslo.
