= Konrad Pecher =

Austrian speed skater

Personal information
- Nationality: Austrian
- Born: 13 December 1930

Sport
- Sport: Speed skating

Konrad Pecher (born 13 December 1930) is an Austrian former speed skater. He competed in three events at the 1952 Winter Olympics.
