= Franz Offenberger =

Austrian speed skater

Personal information
- Nationality: Austrian
- Born: 27 November 1931 Vienna, Austria
- Died: 17 December 2003 (aged 72)

Sport
- Sport: Speed skating

Franz Offenberger (27 November 1931 – 17 December 2003) was an Austrian speed skater. He competed at the 1952 Winter Olympics, the 1956 Winter Olympics and the 1960 Winter Olympics.
