= Dagmar Rom =

Austrian alpine skier (1928–2022)

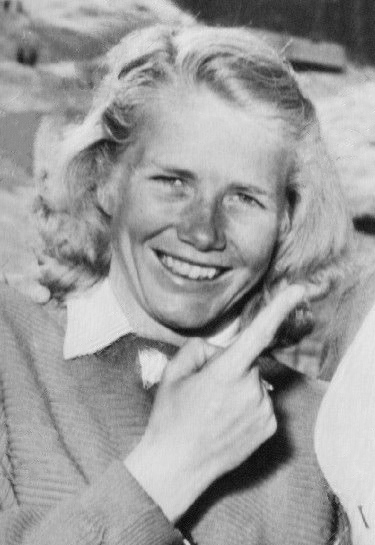
- Rom at the 1950 World Championships

Personal information
- Born: 16 June 1928 Innsbruck, Tyrol, Austria
- Died: 13 October 2022 (aged 94) Innsbruck, Tyrol, Austria

Skiing career
- Sport: Alpine skiing
- Club: TS Innsbruck
- Disciplines: Downhill, giant slalom, slalom, combined

Olympics
- Teams: 1 – (1952)
- Medals: 1 (0 gold)

World Championships
- Teams: 2 – (1950, 1952) includes Olympics
- Medals: 3 (2 gold)
Medal record
Women's alpine skiing
Representing Austria
Olympic Games
Silver medal – second place	1952 Oslo	Giant Slalom
World Championships
Gold medal – first place	1950 Aspen	Slalom
Gold medal – first place	1950 Aspen	Giant Slalom

Dagmar Rom (16 June 1928 – 13 October 2022) was an alpine ski racer from Austria. At age 21 she won two gold medals at the 1950 World Championships in Aspen, Colorado, in the slalom and giant slalom events. Two years later she won a silver medal in the giant slalom at the 1952 Olympics.

From 1950 to 1951, Rom did not take part in international races. With Egon Schöpf, her partner in life, she established a business with sporting goods in Seefeld. Because of her popularity she got a leading role in the 1951 film Night on Mont Blanc directed by Harald Reinl. Because of winning two titles in the Championships of Austrian Skiing Association in the early days of the year 1952 she was qualified for the Olympic Games in Oslo. Directly after the Games she married Mr. Günter Peis, a journalist, and having a child in the same year. She didn't take part in races in the following years. She made a comeback in the winter 1954/55 and would finish 6th in the Slalom of Kitzbühel. But becoming a mother once more in 1955, she ended her sports career. In the 1960s she starred in the Austrian television series Mario, together with her son.

Rom died in Innsbruck on 13 October 2022, at the age of 94.
