= Al Broadhurst =

American speed skater

Personal information
- Born: July 11, 1927 Boston, Massachusetts, United States
- Died: July 11, 2014 (aged 87)

Sport
- Sport: Speed skating

Alfred George Broadhurst (July 11, 1927 – July 11, 2014) was an American speed skater. He competed in two events at the 1952 Winter Olympics.
