= Pat McNamara (speed skater) =

American speed skater

Matthew Patrick Francis McNamara
Personal information
- Born: December 2, 1925 Minneapolis, Hennepin County, Minnesota, United States
- Died: October 24, 2011 (aged 85) Plymouth, Hennepin County, Minnesota

Sport
- Sport: Speed skating

Achievements and titles
- Olympic finals: 1952, 1956

Pat McNamara (December 2, 1925 – October 24, 2011) was an American speed skater. He competed at the 1952 and 1956 Winter Olympics.
