= Chuck Burke =

American speed skater (1930–2025)

Personal information
- Born: Charles William Burke; October 8, 1930 Chicago, Illinois, U.S.
- Died: June 25, 2025 (aged 94) Franklin Park, Illinois, U.S.

Sport
- Sport: Speed skating

Charles William Burke (October 8, 1930 – June 26, 2025) was an American speed skater. He competed at the 1952 Winter Olympics and the 1956 Winter Olympics. Burke died on June 26, 2025, at the age of 94.
