= Annemarie Buchner =

German alpine skier (1924–2014)

Medal record

Representing West Germany

Women's Alpine skiing

Olympic Games
Silver medal – second place	1952 Oslo	Downhill
Bronze medal – third place	1952 Oslo	Slalom
Bronze medal – third place	1952 Oslo	Giant Slalom

Annemarie "Mirl" Buchner-Fischer (German pronunciation: [ˈʔanəmaˌʁiː ˈbuːx.nɐ]; 16 February 1924 – 9 November 2014) was a German Alpine skier. She was born in Ettal. At the 1952 Olympics in Oslo Buchner was silver medalist in the downhill, and bronze medalist in the slalom and in the giant slalom. She was also German Sportswoman of the Year in 1948. She died on 9 November 2014.

Awards
Preceded by Marga Petersen	German Sportswoman of the Year; 1948	Succeeded by Lena Stumpf
