= Korketrekkeren =

Tobogganing track in Oslo, Norway

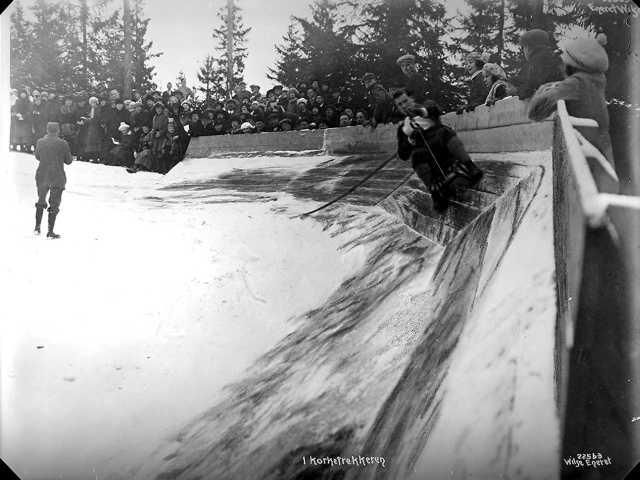
- From the first competition, in 1922
- Interactive map of Korketrekkeren
- Location: Oslo, Norway
- Owner: Oslo Municipality
- Capacity: 15,000
- Field size: 1,507.5 m (4,946 ft)

Construction
- Groundbreaking: 1949 (bobsleigh)
- Opened: 1880s (luge); 1951 (bobsleigh)
- Cost: NOK 615,000 (bobsleigh)

Korketrekkeren (direct translation: "The Corkscrew") is a tobogganing track and former bobsleigh and luge track in Oslo, Norway. The tobogganing track runs between Frognerseteren and Midtstuen and is operated as a public venue by the municipality. Return transport to the top of the hill is undertaken by riding the Oslo Metro's Holmenkollen Line. Tobogganing in the area started in the 1880s, with several roads being used during winter evenings. Auto racing took place in the hill in 1921 and the following year it saw its first luge tournament. The first major tournament was the FIL European Luge Championships 1937. Tobagganing also took place in the nearby Heftyebakken, but from 1950 Korketrekkeren became the sole tobogganing hill and Heftyebakken was used for cross-country skiing.

The bobsleigh track was built for the 1952 Winter Olympics, where it hosted two bobsleigh events. Contrary to popular belief, this was not built at Korketrekkeren but as a separate run nearby also starting at Frognerseteren. It was built as a temporary, artificial track with the curves being constructed in snow and then frozen hard to ice. Trial runs were undertaken in 1951 and the bobsleigh course was not used after 1952. Both Olympic events were won by Germany, with Andreas Ostler and Lorenz Nieberl participating in both winning teams. The tobogganing hill hosted the inaugural FIL World Luge Championships 1955, with Norway's Anton Salvesen winning the men's single—the only time in history Norway has won a World Luge Championships medal.

== History ==
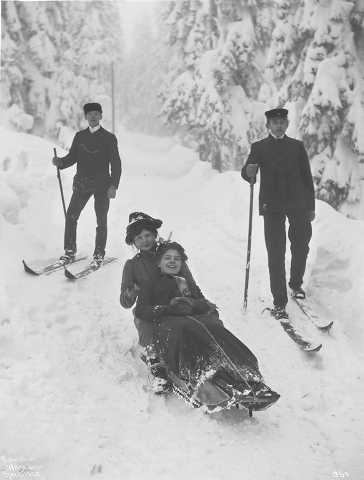
Tobogganing and skiing in 1903

Korketrekkeren was originally part of Frognerseterveien, a road which ran up to Frognerseteren. It was completed in 1867 to the orders of landlord Thomas Johannessen Heftye, who had been purchasing forest properties in the area. The section between Svendstuen and Frognerseteren gradually became known as Korktrekkeren. Holmen- og Voksenkollselskapet was established in 1888 and undertook a series of public infrastructure investments in the area, including the construction of roads, skiing trails, natural tobogganing tracks and a chapel. The property was given to Kristiania Municipality (today Oslo Municipality) in 1894. Tobagganing became a popular sport from the 1880s and Holmen- og Voksenkollselskapet rented out sleds which were permitted to be used on roads and designated tracks after 19:00 on evenings with moonlight.

Norsk Vinterturistforening was founded in 1899 to work towards encouraging English tourists to visit Oslo, specifically by building tobogganing tracks. A committee was established in 1904 to look into building a new tobogganing track in the Holmenkollen area. It proposed that two new tracks be built, one from Voksenkollveien to Peisestuen, and one from Peisestuen to Midtstuen, and that Korketrekkeren be upgraded to allow for safer tobogganing. The investments cost 7,000 Norwegian krone (NOK) and the annual operating costs estimated at NOK 2,000. The investments were financed with NOK 2,000 by Christiania Brænnevinssamlag and NOK 5,000 by Akeforeningen. The latter was established in 1905 and was also responsible to operating the track.

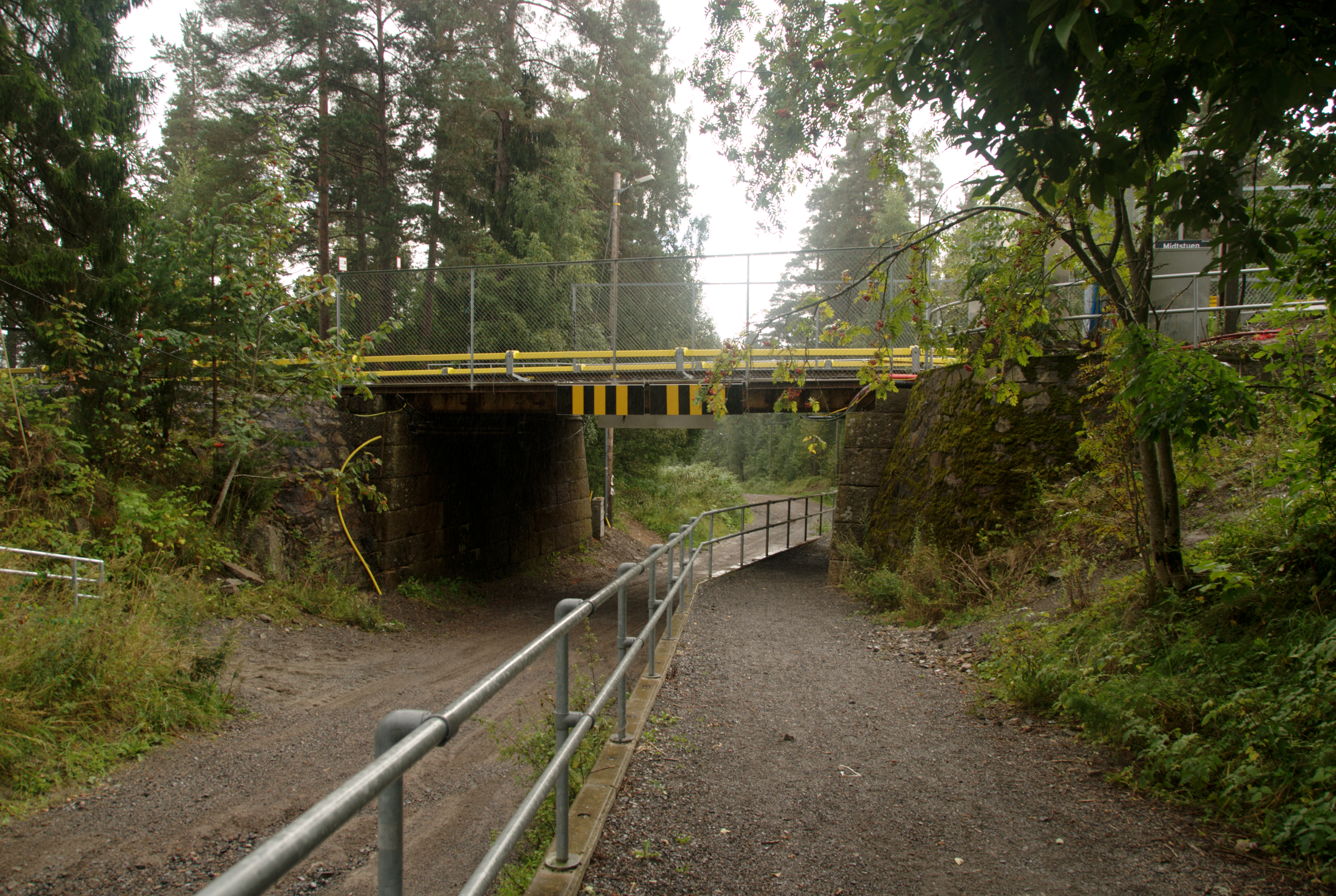
Korketrekkeren as it passes under the Oslo Metro's Holmenkollen Line at Midtstuen

In 1898, the Holmenkollen Line was opened to Besserud. One of the line's main revenue sources was transporting city-dwellers to the recreational area of Nordmarka where they would go skiing. An alternative activity was tobogganing down the hill back to Majorstuen. The operator Holmenkolbanen immediately started plans to extend the line. There were two proposals: a continuation of the line past Holmenkollen and a branch from Midtstuen up Korketrekkeren to Frogneseteren. However, the latter required the use of a rack railway, as it would give a 1:8 gradient. The former route was selected and the line was extended to Frogneseteren in 1916. Holmenkolbanen started renting out sleds at Frogneseteren, which could be returned at most stations. To save the return ticket, many chose to continue the tobogganing ride to Majorstuen.

The use of Korketrekkeren for tobogganing created a conflict with the local residents—especially at the guest house in Sverdrupstuen, which was often blocked on Sundays. There was also a conflict between cross-country skiing and tobogganing, as both groups wanted priority on the road. Akeforeningen proposed holding a tournament in 1921, but this was rejected by the municipal council. However, an auto race was held on the track that year. Permission for the sleighing race was given the following season, resulting in regular tournaments. Construction of Heftyebakken took place in 1930. The track was constructed between Frogerseteren to Svendstuen, including a concrete curve which allowed it to connect to Korketrekkeren. Heftyebakken had a poor profile as it was not steep enough in the lower areas. In 1950, Heftyebakken was converted to a skiing trail and Korketrekkeren became a pure tobogganing trail.

Unusually for winter sports, bobsleigh has never been popular in Norway. The country had not sent an Olympic team until the 1948 Winter Olympics and there were no previous bobsleigh tracks in Norway when Oslo was awarded the 1952 Winter Olympics. Two Swiss civil engineers, Heinz Cattani and Emil Ingold, were the main technical consultants for the development of the venue. The steep terrain made construction excessively expensive, resulting in the organizing committee deciding to build a temporary track, without permanent concrete and stone curves. Instead, a new track was constructed each year using snow: the overhangs were built by hand, the tracks were leveled and the structure sprayed with ice until it was hard.

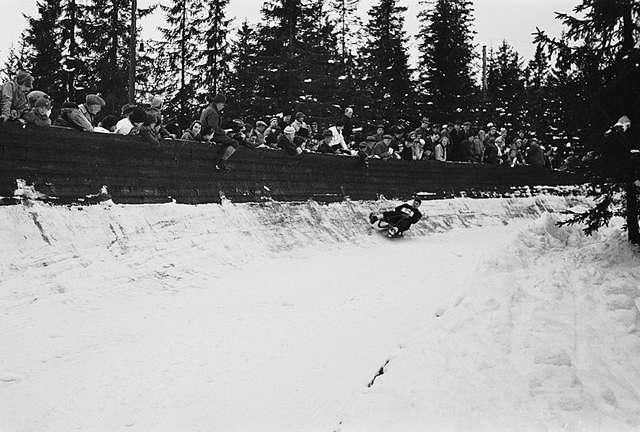
FIL European Luge Championships 1937

The track route was built under supervision of Sigurd Lund and Carl Venderboe in 1949 and 1950 and subsequently corrected by Cattani. The only fixed installation was a water main which ran along the track, using Øvresetertjern as its water source. Engineer Luigi Angelini from Switzerland was hired to supervise the construction of the curves, which cost NOK 615,000. The track was first constructed for training in 1951 and then for the Olympics in 1952.

There have been occasional proposals that Norway should build a permanent bobsleigh track, where Korketrekkeren was the leading location. The debate died out in the 1990s with the selection of Lillehammer as the host of the 1994 Winter Olympics and the subsequent construction of Lillehammer Olympic Bobsleigh and Luge Track. Also the Oslo bid for the 2018 Winter Olympics proposed using the Lillehammer track. In 2007, there were two serious accidents in the hill and it was subsequently closed by the police. The municipality then renovated the hill, removing poles and padding dangerous edges.

== Olympic track ==
Map of the Olympic bobsleigh track

The Olympic track ran from Frogneseteren, with the start line located at 429.2 meters (1,408 ft) above mean sea level. The course falls 124.35 meters (408.0 ft), with the finish line located at 304.85 meters (1,000.2 ft) elevation. The track had an average 8.6 percent gradient, which varied between 3.67 and 13.86 percent. The track was 1,507.5 meters (4,946 ft) long and had 13 curves, varying with radii between 14 and 50 meters (46 and 164 ft). Beyond the finish-line the track ran steeply uphill. The track had three boxes for time-keepers, one at the start, one mid-way and one at the finish. In addition there was a bob garage at the top of the hill. Bobs were transport up using a four-wheel-drive car up Heftyebakken. The track had 50 telephone linesto keep up with the competition and track conditions during the event.

The following is a list of the turns with their names and curve radii.

List of turns
Turn	Name	Radius (m)	Radius (ft)
1	Ole Lukkøye	14	46
2	Sigurd Lundekurven	14	46
3	–	20	66
4	–	20	66
5	–	50	160
6	Cattanikurven	25	82
7	Syvern	45	148
8	Vendelboekurven	22	72
9	Veggen	20	66
10	–	50	160
11	Snipp	35	115
12	Snapp	50	160
13	Snute	40	130

== Tobogganing ==
Korketrekkeren is a public hill owned by the municipality and can be used free of charge. Toboggans can be rented from Skiservice and Akerforeningen. The start of the hill is located next to Frognerseteren Station on the Oslo Metro's Holmenkollen Line and the end of the course is located at Midtstuen Station. Tobogganists can take their sleds on the train using ordinary tickets. There is also a smaller beginners track at Skistua at Frognerseteren. Korketrekkeren is widely regarded as Oslo's prime tobogganing course.

== Events ==
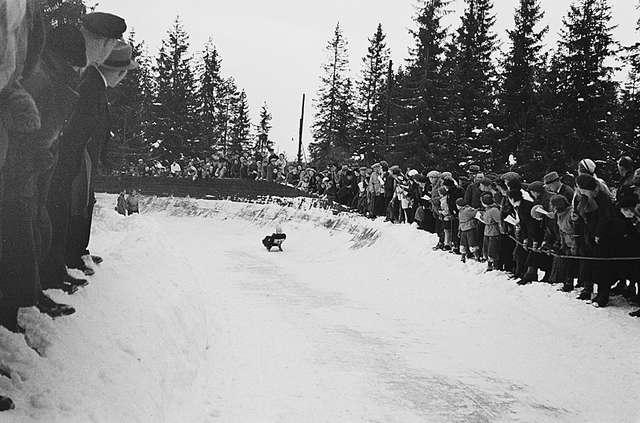
FIL European Luge Championships 1937

=== 1937 European championships ===
The FIL European Luge Championships 1937 were the sixth to be contested and the only to have been held in Norway. Six nations competed—Martin Tietze from Germany won both the men's singles and along with Kurt Weidner the men's doubles. Norway took all the medals in the women's singles with Titti Maartmann winning.

Event	Gold	Silver	Bronze
Men's singles	Martin Tietze (GER)	Vilhelm Klavenæs (NOR)	Harald Seegard (NOR)
Women's singles	Titti Maartmann (NOR)	Liv Jensen (NOR)	Helen Galtung (NOR)
Men's doubles	Germany; Martin Tietze, Kurt Weidner	Germany; Walter Feist, Walter Kluge	Czechoslovakia; Rudolf Maschke, Erhard Grundmann

=== 1952 Winter Olympics ===
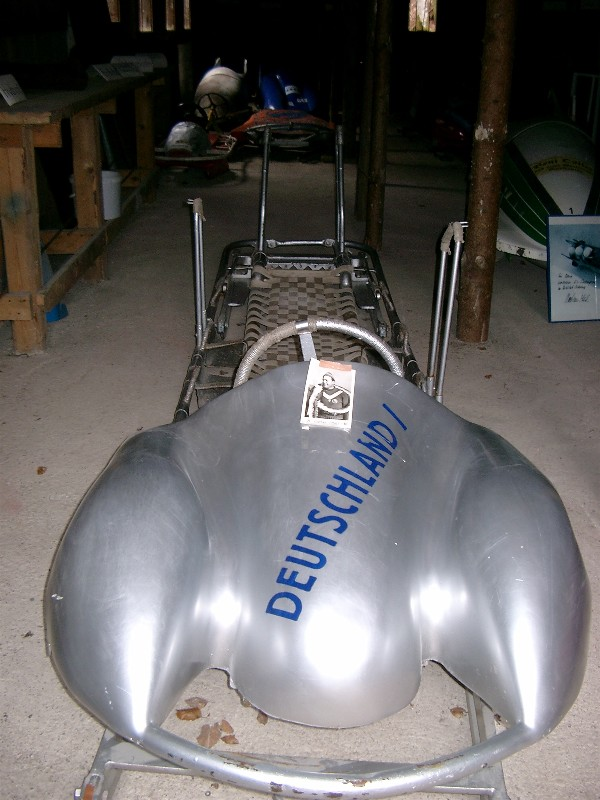
The bobsleigh that won the Olympics

Two events in bobsleigh were held at the 1952 Winter Olympics—two-man and four-man. Both were contested over four heats over two days. Two-man was contested on 14 and 15 February, while four-man was contested on 21 and 22 February. The same teams won both events, with Germans Andreas Ostler and Lorenz Nieberl winning gold in both events and Friedrich Kuhn and Franz Kemser winning gold in the four-man. The events attracted up to 15,000 spectators.

Event	Gold	Silver	Bronze
Two-man	Germany; Germany I Andreas Ostler; Lorenz Nieberl	United States; USA I Stanley Benham; Patrick Martin	Switzerland; Switzerland I Fritz Feierabend; Stephan Waser
Four-man	Germany; Germany I Andreas Ostler; Friedrich Kuhn; Lorenz Nieberl; Franz Kemser	United States; USA I Stanley Benham; Patrick Martin; Howard Crossett; James Atkinson	Switzerland; Switzerland I Fritz Feierabend; Albert Madörin; André Filippini; Stephan Waser

=== 1955 World championships ===
FIL World Luge Championships 1955 was the inaugural world championship in luge and the only to have been held in Norway. Eight countries participated, with the top results being dominated by Austria. The men's singles was won by Anton Salvesen, which remains the only medal ever won by Norway in the World Luge Championships. The women's singles saw double Austrian victory with Karla Kienzl winning ahead of Maria Isser. In the doubles, Hans Krausner and Josef Thaler won ahead of their Austrian countrymen Josef Isser and Maria Isser.

Event	Gold	Silver	Bronze
Men's singles	Anton Salvesen (NOR)	Josef Thaler (AUT)	Josef Isser (AUT)
Women's singles	Karla Kienzl (AUT)	Maria Isser (AUT)	Marianne Bauer (GER)
Doubles	Austria; Hans Krausner, Josef Thaler	Austria; Josef Isser, Maria Isser	West Germany; Josef Strillinger, Fritz Nachmann
