= Bobsleigh at the 1952 Winter Olympics – Two-man =

The two-man bobsleigh results at the 1952 Winter Olympics in Oslo. The competition was held on Thursday and Friday, 14 and 15 February 1952.

== Medallists ==
Gold	Silver	Bronze
Germany; Germany I Andreas Ostler; Lorenz Nieberl	United States; USA I Stanley Benham; Patrick Martin	Switzerland; Switzerland I Fritz Feierabend; Stephan Waser

== Results ==
Rank	Team	Athletes	Run 1	Run 2	Run 3	Run 4	Final
Gold	Germany Germany I	Andreas Ostler & Lorenz Nieberl	1:20.76	1:21.64	1:21.02	1:21.12	5:24.54
Silver	United States USA I	Stanley Benham & Patrick Martin	1:22.03	1:22.12	1:21.21	1:21.53	5:26.89
Bronze	Switzerland Switzerland I	Fritz Feierabend & Stephan Waser	1:22.13	1:22.46	1:21.67	1:21.45	5:27.71
4	Switzerland Switzerland II	Felix Endrich & Werner Spring	1:22.14	1:22.32	1:22.50	1:22.19	5:29.15
5	France France II	André Robin & Henri Rivière	1:23.22	1:23.06	1:22.85	1:22.85	5:31.98
6	Belgium Belgium I	Marcel Leclef & Albert Casteleyns	1:22.09	1:23.69	1:22.94	1:23.79	5:32.51
7	United States USA II	Frederick Fortune & John L. Helmer	1:23.46	1:24.48	1:23.15	1:22.73	5:33.82
8	Sweden Sweden I	Olle Axelsson & Jan Lapidoth	1:24.30	1:23.92	1:23.46	1:24.09	5:35.77
9	Austria Austria I	Karl Wagner & Franz Eckhardt	1:24.16	1:24.54	1:24.00	1:24.34	5:37.04
10	Italy Italy II	Alberto Della Beffa & Dario Colombi	1:23.86	1:24.71	1:24.03	1:24.62	5:37.22
11	Germany Germany II	Theo Kitt & Friedrich Kuhn	1:24.43	1:25.22	1:24.52	1:24.08	5:38.25
12	Italy Italy I	Umberto Gilarduzzi & Luigi Cavalieri	1:23.86	1:25.26	1:24.80	1:24.44	5:38.36
13	Norway Norway I	Arne Holst & Kåre Christiansen	1:24.52	1:24.77	1:24.24	1:24.88	5:38.41
14	Norway Norway II	Erik Tandberg & Curt James Haydn	1:26.33	1:24.82	1:24.23	1:24.24	5:39.62
15	Sweden Sweden II	Kjell Holmström & Nils Landgren	1:25.76	1:25.84	1:25.65	1:25.57	5:42.82
16	Austria Austria II	Heinz Hoppichler & Wilfried Thurner	1:30.27	1:28.30	1:27.78	1:27.51	5:53.86
17	France France I	Robert Guillard & Joseph Chatelus	1:29.68	1:28.84	1:28.71	1:28.08	5:55.31
18	Belgium Belgium II	Charles De Sorgher & André De Wulf	1:29.49	1:29.00	1:29.29	1:30.50	5:58.28
