= Germany at the Winter Olympics =

- IOC code: GER
- NOC: German Olympic Sports Confederation
- Website: www.dosb.de (in German, English, and French)
- Medals: Gold 171 Silver 164 Bronze 126 Total 461

Winter Olympics appearances (overview)
- 1928; 1932; 1936; 1948; 1952; 1956–1988; 1992; 1994; 1998; 2002; 2006; 2010; 2014; 2018; 2022; 2026

Other related appearances
- United Team of Germany (1956–1964); East Germany (1968–1988); West Germany (1968–1988)

Athletes from Germany (GER) have appeared 23 of the 25 editions of the Winter Olympic Games as they were not invited to two events after the World Wars, in 1924 and 1948. Germany hosted the 1936 Winter Olympics in Garmisch-Partenkirchen and had been selected to host in 1940 again.

The nation appeared 14 times as a single country (IOC code GER), before World War II and again after German reunification in 1990. Due to partitions after the World Wars, namely three post-WW2 German states, German athletes took part seven times for the contemporary states they lived in, in 1952, and from 1968 to 1988, with a unified team in between. In three Olympics from 1956 to 1964, German athletes from the separate states in West and East appeared as a United Team of Germany, which is currently listed by the IOC under French language abbreviation EUA, not English language GER.

The results of German athletes were and are recorded under designations like GER, EUA, FRG, GDR and also SAA for the Saarland as protectorate which only took part in the 1952 Summer games and won no medal.

Including the 2026 Winter Olympics, German athletes have won 461 medals: 171 gold, 164 silver and 126 bronze. The IOC currently splits these results among four codes, even though only the East German Democratic Republic (GDR) from 1968 to 1988 had sent a separate team to compete against the team of the German NOC that represented Germany (GER) since 1896.

== Timeline of Germany at the Winter Olympics ==
=== 1924 - 1948 ===
1928-1932

In the Paris Peace Conference, the outbreak of World War I was blamed on Germany and other Central Powers allies. These nations, even though having new republican governments by now, were not invited to the 1920 Summer Olympics. While all other banned nations except Germany were invited again for the 1924 Summer Olympics, held for the second time in Pierre de Coubertin's home town of Paris, and for the 1924 Winter Olympics, also held in France, the ban on Germany was not lifted until 1925. This was likely related to the ongoing French Occupation of the Ruhr and the Rheinland between 1923 and 1925. Thus Germany was not present in Chamonix for the first Winter Olympics.

Germany took part the first time in the 1928 Winter Olympics in St. Moritz, with rather modest results, scoring only a Bronze medal in bobsleigh. Germany doubled the low score in the 1932 Winter Olympics held in Lake Placid, United States. Both 1932 games, held during the worldwide Great Depression, suffered from low European participation due to high cost of travel overseas.

1936

Already in spring of 1931 it had been decided that the 1936 Summer Olympics were to be held in Berlin. Germany should host the 1936 Winter Olympics, too. From 1933 onwards, Germany became known as Nazi Germany, the change being marked also by the use of the Nazi party flag. To host the winter event, two Bavarian towns were merged to form Garmisch-Partenkirchen. Alpine skiing made its first appearance as the combined, which added the results of both the downhill and slalom which were not separate contests yet. German athletes won Gold and Silver in both the men's and women's combined, for a 2nd rank overall.

The 1940 Winter Olympics were to be held in Sapporo, but Japan withdrew in 1938 due to the Second Sino-Japanese War. In June 1939, Garmisch-Partenkirchen was selected again, but three months later World War II broke out and the 1940 Winter Games were cancelled in November 1939. The 1944 Winter Olympics did not take place either. For the 1948 Winter Olympics, with the war in recent memory, Germany (and Japan) was not invited as it had no recognized NOC anymore. The NOC had been, as other organizations, been dissolved by the Allies.

=== Separate German teams 1952 - 1988 ===
1952-1956 since 1972

The 1952 Winter Olympics were held in Norway, which had been occupied in 1940 by Germans. Public discussions in Norway were rather lively on the subject of whether or not Germans should be admitted to the Winter Games. Following the annual meeting of the IOC in Vienna in May 1951, invitations were extended to the German Olympic Committee, placed in the Federal Republic of Germany. On the whole, the press approved of this decision, and the reaction of the Norwegian public seemed to prove that the decision was based on a correct estimate of the public opinion.

The IOC had not recognized the East German NOC, and asked the GDR to send athletes to the German NOC team, which was rejected by the GDR officials. The Saarland, having a recognized NOC but barely any winter sports tradition, did not participate in the Winter Games, but in the 1952 Summer Games, before joining West Germany later on. Thus Germans from West Germany took part in the 1952 Winter Olympics in 21 of 22 events, winning two Gold medals in bobsleigh, and one in figure skating. The IOC presently attributes the 2 Gold medals won by Bavarian bobsledder Andreas Ostler to "Federal Republic of Germany (1950-1990, "GER" since) FRG" for a 5th rank, while all other medals are attributed to "Germany GER" for a sixth rank. The figure skating couple Ria Falk/Paul Falk won Gold. Skier Annemarie Buchner aka Mirl Buchner won a medal in each of the three events she took part. Skier Rosa Reichert took another silver medal.

1960-1968

During the Oslo IOC meetings, several important matters were discussed, such as East German participation in Olympic Games. In Olympic Games in 1956, 1960 and 1964, German athletes of both states competed together as United Team of Germany (GER then, currently designated EUA). The 1968 games saw two separate German teams which still used the compromise common symbols.

1972-1988

The two states sent independent teams, incl. separate national symbols, designated as East Germany (GDR) and West Germany (GER 1968-1976, FRG 1980-1988) after that for five Games between 1972 and 1988 until the separate East German state ceased to exist in 1990.

=== 1992- ===
After the German reunification in 1990 country returned under the IOC code GER and topped Olympic medal tables in 1992, 1998, 2002 and 2006.

== Overview of Olympic participation ==
=== Combined medals at the Winter Olympics (including all German NOCs) ===
status after the 2026 Olympics

	Winter Games				
Team (IOC code)	№	1st place, gold medalist(s)	2nd place, silver medalist(s)	3rd place, bronze medalist(s)	Total
Germany	14	113	107	73	293
United Team of Germany	3	8	6	5	19
West Germany	6	11	15	13	39
East Germany	6	39	36	35	110
Total	23	171	164	126	461

Combined IOC codes	No. Games	1st place, gold medalist(s)	2nd place, silver medalist(s)	3rd place, bronze medalist(s)	Combined total
Germany (GER)	14	113	107	73	293
Germany (GER) (EUA)	17	121	113	78	312
Germany (GER) (EUA) (FRG)	23	132	128	91	351
Germany (GER) (EUA) (FRG) (GDR)	29 (Note: Counting the six Winter Games where both East Germany (GDR) and West Germany (FRG) competed as two appearances.)	171	164	126	461

=== All German NOCs at the Winter Olympics ===
Host country

Games	Athletes	Gold	Silver	Bronze	Total	Rank	Team
1928 St. Moritz	44	0	0	1	1	8	Germany (GER)
1932 Lake Placid	20	0	0	2	2	9	Germany (GER)
1936 Garmisch-Partenkirchen	55	3	3	0	6	2	Germany (GER)
1948 St. Moritz	did not participate						
1952 Oslo	53	3	2	2	7	4	Germany (GER)
1956 Cortina d'Ampezzo	63	1	0	1	2	9	United Team of Germany (EUA)
1960 Squaw Valley	74	4	3	1	8	2	United Team of Germany (EUA)
1964 Innsbruck	96	3	3	3	9	6	United Team of Germany (EUA)
1968 Grenoble	57	1	2	2	5	10	East Germany (GDR)
1968 Grenoble	87	2	2	3	7	8	West Germany (FRG)
1972 Sapporo	42	4	3	7	14	2	East Germany (GDR)
1972 Sapporo	78	3	1	1	5	6	West Germany (FRG)
1976 Innsbruck	59	7	5	7	19	2	East Germany (GDR)
1976 Innsbruck	71	2	5	3	10	5	West Germany (FRG)
1980 Lake Placid	53	9	7	7	23	2	East Germany (GDR)
1980 Lake Placid	80	0	2	3	5	12	West Germany (FRG)
1984 Sarajevo	56	9	9	6	24	1	East Germany (GDR)
1984 Sarajevo	84	2	1	1	4	8	West Germany (FRG)
1988 Calgary	53	9	10	6	25	2	East Germany (GDR)
1988 Calgary	90	2	4	2	8	8	West Germany (FRG)
1992 Albertville	111	10	10	6	26	1	Germany (GER)
1994 Lillehammer	112	9	7	8	24	3	Germany (GER)
1998 Nagano	125	12	9	8	29	1	Germany (GER)
2002 Salt Lake City	157	12	16	8	36	2	Germany (GER)
2006 Turin	162	11	12	6	29	1	Germany (GER)
2010 Vancouver	153	10	13	7	30	2	Germany (GER)
2014 Sochi	153	9	5	5	19	5	Germany (GER)
2018 Pyeongchang	153	14	10	7	31	2	Germany (GER)
2022 Beijing	149	12	10	5	27	2	Germany (GER)
2026 Milano Cortina	185	8	10	8	26	5	Germany (GER)
Total	2,490	171	164	126	461	1	

=== Medals by sport (GER 1928–1936, 1952, 1992–current) ===
Leading in that sport

Sport	Gold	Silver	Bronze	Total
Luge	25	13	10	48
Biathlon	21	20	14	55
Bobsleigh	19	13	8	40
Speed skating	13	15	10	38
Alpine skiing	12	10	7	29
Ski jumping	7	7	3	17
Nordic combined	6	6	4	16
Figure skating	4	3	4	11
Cross-country skiing	3	10	4	17
Skeleton	2	6	4	12
Snowboarding	1	4	2	7
Freestyle skiing	1	1	1	3
Ice hockey	0	1	1	2
Totals (13 entries)	114	109	72	295

These totals include the one gold and one silver medal won by Germany in figure skating at the 1908 Summer Olympics.

=== Medals by sport (EUA 1956–1964) ===
Sport	Gold	Silver	Bronze	Total
Luge	2	2	1	5
Alpine skiing	2	1	2	5
Figure skating	1	2	0	3
Speed skating	1	1	0	2
Nordic combined	1	0	1	2
Ski jumping	1	0	1	2
Totals (6 entries)	8	6	5	19

=== Medals by sport (GDR 1968–1988) ===
Sport	Gold	Silver	Bronze	Total
Luge	13	8	8	29
Speed skating	8	12	9	29
Bobsleigh	5	5	3	13
Biathlon	3	4	4	11
Figure skating	3	3	4	10
Nordic combined	3	0	4	7
Ski jumping	2	3	2	7
Cross-country skiing	2	1	1	4
Totals (8 entries)	39	36	35	110

=== Medals by sport (FRG 1968–1988) ===
Sport	Gold	Silver	Bronze	Total
Alpine skiing	3	5	1	9
Speed skating	3	0	0	3
Nordic combined	2	1	0	3
Luge	1	4	5	10
Bobsleigh	1	3	2	6
Biathlon	1	2	2	5
Figure skating	0	0	2	2
Ice hockey	0	0	1	1
Totals (8 entries)	11	15	13	39

== Medalists ==
=== Alpine skiing ===
Medal	Name	Games	Sport	Event
Gold	Franz Pfnür	(Germany) 1936 Garmisch-Partenkirchen	Alpine skiing	Men's combined
Gold	Christl Cranz	(Germany) 1936 Garmisch-Partenkirchen	Alpine skiing	Women's combined
Silver	Gustav Lantschner	(Germany) 1936 Garmisch-Partenkirchen	Alpine skiing	Men's combined
Silver	Käthe Grasegger	(Germany) 1936 Garmisch-Partenkirchen	Alpine skiing	Women's combined
Silver	Annemarie Buchner	(Norway) 1952 Oslo	Alpine skiing	Women's downhill
Silver	Ossi Reichert	(Norway) 1952 Oslo	Alpine skiing	Women's slalom
Bronze	Annemarie Buchner	(Norway) 1952 Oslo	Alpine skiing	Women's giant slalom
Bronze	Annemarie Buchner	(Norway) 1952 Oslo	Alpine skiing	Women's slalom
Gold	Ossi Reichert (EUA)	(Italy) 1956 Cortina d'Ampezzo	Alpine skiing	Women's giant slalom
Gold	Heidi Biebl (EUA)	(United States) 1960 Squaw Valley	Alpine skiing	Women's downhill
Silver	Hans-Peter Lanig (EUA)	(United States) 1960 Squaw Valley	Alpine skiing	Men's downhill
Bronze	Barbara Henneberger (EUA)	(United States) 1960 Squaw Valley	Alpine skiing	Women's slalom
Bronze	Wolfgang Bartels (EUA)	(Austria) 1964 Innsbruck	Alpine skiing	Men's downhill
Gold	Rosi Mittermaier (FRG)	(Austria) 1976 Innsbruck	Alpine skiing	Women's downhill
Gold	Rosi Mittermaier (FRG)	(Austria) 1976 Innsbruck	Alpine skiing	Women's slalom
Silver	Rosi Mittermaier (FRG)	(Austria) 1976 Innsbruck	Alpine skiing	Women's giant slalom
Silver	Irene Epple (FRG)	(United States) 1980 Lake Placid	Alpine skiing	Women's giant slalom
Silver	Christa Kinshofer (FRG)	(United States) 1980 Lake Placid	Alpine skiing	Women's slalom
Gold	Marina Kiehl (FRG)	(Canada) 1988 Calgary	Alpine skiing	Women's downhill
Silver	Frank Wörndl (FRG)	(Canada) 1988 Calgary	Alpine skiing	Men's slalom
Silver	Christa Kinshofer (FRG)	(Canada) 1988 Calgary	Alpine skiing	Women's giant slalom
Bronze	Christa Kinshofer (FRG)	(Canada) 1988 Calgary	Alpine skiing	Women's slalom
Bronze	Katja Seizinger	(France) 1992 Albertville	Alpine skiing	Women's super-G
Gold	Markus Wasmeier	(Norway) 1994 Lillehammer	Alpine skiing	Men's giant slalom
Gold	Markus Wasmeier	(Norway) 1994 Lillehammer	Alpine skiing	Men's super-G
Gold	Katja Seizinger	(Norway) 1994 Lillehammer	Alpine skiing	Women's downhill
Silver	Martina Ertl	(Norway) 1994 Lillehammer	Alpine skiing	Women's giant slalom
Gold	Katja Seizinger	(Japan) 1998 Nagano	Alpine skiing	Women's combined
Gold	Katja Seizinger	(Japan) 1998 Nagano	Alpine skiing	Women's downhill
Gold	Hilde Gerg	(Japan) 1998 Nagano	Alpine skiing	Women's slalom
Silver	Martina Ertl	(Japan) 1998 Nagano	Alpine skiing	Women's combined
Bronze	Hilde Gerg	(Japan) 1998 Nagano	Alpine skiing	Women's combined
Bronze	Katja Seizinger	(Japan) 1998 Nagano	Alpine skiing	Women's giant slalom
Bronze	Martina Ertl	(United States) 2002 Salt Lake City	Alpine skiing	Women's combined
Gold	Maria Riesch	(Canada) 2010 Vancouver	Alpine skiing	Women's combined
Gold	Viktoria Rebensburg	(Canada) 2010 Vancouver	Alpine skiing	Women's giant slalom
Gold	Maria Riesch	(Canada) 2010 Vancouver	Alpine skiing	Women's slalom
Gold	Maria Höfl-Riesch	(Russia) 2014 Sochi	Alpine skiing	Women's combined
Silver	Maria Höfl-Riesch	(Russia) 2014 Sochi	Alpine skiing	Women's super-G
Bronze	Viktoria Rebensburg	(Russia) 2014 Sochi	Alpine skiing	Women's giant slalom
Silver	Emma Aicher; Lena Dürr; Julian Rauchfuß; Alexander Schmid; Linus Straßer	(China) 2022 Beijing	Alpine skiing	Mixed team
Silver	Emma Aicher	(Italy) 2026 Milano Cortina	Alpine skiing	Women's downhill
Silver	Emma Aicher; Kira Weidle-Winkelmann	(Italy) 2026 Milano Cortina	Alpine skiing	Women's team combined

=== Biathlon ===
Medal	Name	Games	Sport	Event
Silver	Hansjörg Knauthe (GDR)	(Japan) 1972 Sapporo	Biathlon	Men's individual
Bronze	Hansjörg Knauthe; Joachim Meischner; Dieter Speer; Horst Koschka (GDR)	(Japan) 1972 Sapporo	Biathlon	Men's relay
Bronze	Karl-Heinz Menz; Frank Ullrich; Manfred Beer; Manfred Geyer (GDR)	(Austria) 1976 Innsbruck	Biathlon	Men's relay
Gold	Frank Ullrich (GDR)	(United States) 1980 Lake Placid	Biathlon	Men's sprint
Silver	Frank Ullrich (GDR)	(United States) 1980 Lake Placid	Biathlon	Men's individual
Silver	Mathias Jung; Klaus Siebert; Frank Ullrich; Eberhard Rösch (GDR)	(United States) 1980 Lake Placid	Biathlon	Men's relay
Bronze	Eberhard Rösch (GDR)	(United States) 1980 Lake Placid	Biathlon	Men's individual
Bronze	Franz Bernreiter; Hans Estner; Peter Angerer; Gerd Winkler (FRG)	(United States) 1980 Lake Placid	Biathlon	Men's relay
Gold	Peter Angerer (FRG)	(Socialist Federal Republic of Yugoslavia) 1984 Sarajevo	Biathlon	Men's individual
Silver	Frank-Peter Roetsch (GDR)	(Socialist Federal Republic of Yugoslavia) 1984 Sarajevo	Biathlon	Men's individual
Silver	Peter Angerer (FRG)	(Socialist Federal Republic of Yugoslavia) 1984 Sarajevo	Biathlon	Men's sprint
Bronze	Matthias Jacob (GDR)	(Socialist Federal Republic of Yugoslavia) 1984 Sarajevo	Biathlon	Men's sprint
Bronze	Ernst Reiter; Walter Pichler; Peter Angerer; Fritz Fischer (FRG)	(Socialist Federal Republic of Yugoslavia) 1984 Sarajevo	Biathlon	Men's relay
Gold	Frank-Peter Roetsch (GDR)	(Canada) 1988 Calgary	Biathlon	Men's individual
Gold	Frank-Peter Roetsch (GDR)	(Canada) 1988 Calgary	Biathlon	Men's sprint
Silver	Ernst Reiter; Stefan Höck; Peter Angerer; Fritz Fischer (GDR)	(Canada) 1988 Calgary	Biathlon	Men's relay
Gold	Mark Kirchner	(France) 1992 Albertville	Biathlon	Men's sprint
Gold	Ricco Groß; Jens Steinigen; Mark Kirchner; Fritz Fischer	(France) 1992 Albertville	Biathlon	Men's relay
Gold	Antje Misersky	(France) 1992 Albertville	Biathlon	Women's individual
Silver	Mark Kirchner	(France) 1992 Albertville	Biathlon	Men's individual
Silver	Ricco Groß	(France) 1992 Albertville	Biathlon	Men's sprint
Silver	Antje Misersky	(France) 1992 Albertville	Biathlon	Women's sprint
Silver	Uschi Disl; Antje Misersky; Petra Schaaf	(France) 1992 Albertville	Biathlon	Women's relay
Gold	Ricco Groß; Frank Luck; Mark Kirchner; Sven Fischer	(Norway) 1994 Lillehammer	Biathlon	Men's relay
Silver	Frank Luck	(Norway) 1994 Lillehammer	Biathlon	Men's individual
Silver	Ricco Groß	(Norway) 1994 Lillehammer	Biathlon	Men's sprint
Silver	Uschi Disl; Antje Harvey; Simone Greiner-Petter-Memm; Petra Schaaf	(Norway) 1994 Lillehammer	Biathlon	Women's relay
Bronze	Sven Fischer	(Norway) 1994 Lillehammer	Biathlon	Men's individual
Bronze	Uschi Disl	(Norway) 1994 Lillehammer	Biathlon	Women's individual
Gold	Ricco Groß; Peter Sendel; Sven Fischer; Frank Luck	(Japan) 1998 Nagano	Biathlon	Men's relay
Gold	Uschi Disl; Martina Zellner; Katrin Apel; Petra Behle	(Japan) 1998 Nagano	Biathlon	Women's relay
Silver	Uschi Disl	(Japan) 1998 Nagano	Biathlon	Women's sprint
Bronze	Uschi Disl	(Japan) 1998 Nagano	Biathlon	Women's individual
Bronze	Katrin Apel	(Japan) 1998 Nagano	Biathlon	Women's sprint
Gold	Andrea Henkel	(United States) 2002 Salt Lake City	Biathlon	Women's individual
Gold	Kati Wilhelm	(United States) 2002 Salt Lake City	Biathlon	Women's sprint
Gold	Katrin Apel; Uschi Disl; Andrea Henkel; Kati Wilhelm	(United States) 2002 Salt Lake City	Biathlon	Women's relay
Silver	Frank Luck	(United States) 2002 Salt Lake City	Biathlon	Men's individual
Silver	Sven Fischer	(United States) 2002 Salt Lake City	Biathlon	Men's sprint
Silver	Ricco Groß; Peter Sendel; Sven Fischer; Frank Luck	(United States) 2002 Salt Lake City	Biathlon	Men's relay
Silver	Uschi Disl	(United States) 2002 Salt Lake City	Biathlon	Women's sprint
Silver	Kati Wilhelm	(United States) 2002 Salt Lake City	Biathlon	Women's pursuit
Bronze	Ricco Groß	(United States) 2002 Salt Lake City	Biathlon	Men's pursuit
Gold	Michael Greis	(Italy) 2006 Turin	Biathlon	Men's individual
Gold	Sven Fischer	(Italy) 2006 Turin	Biathlon	Men's sprint
Gold	Michael Greis	(Italy) 2006 Turin	Biathlon	Men's mass start
Gold	Ricco Groß; Michael Rösch; Sven Fischer; Michael Greis	(Italy) 2006 Turin	Biathlon	Men's relay
Gold	Kati Wilhelm	(Italy) 2006 Turin	Biathlon	Women's pursuit
Silver	Martina Glagow	(Italy) 2006 Turin	Biathlon	Women's individual
Silver	Martina Glagow	(Italy) 2006 Turin	Biathlon	Women's pursuit
Silver	Kati Wilhelm	(Italy) 2006 Turin	Biathlon	Women's mass start
Silver	Martina Glagow; Andrea Henkel; Katrin Apel; Kati Wilhelm	(Italy) 2006 Turin	Biathlon	Women's relay
Bronze	Sven Fischer	(Italy) 2006 Turin	Biathlon	Men's pursuit
Bronze	Uschi Disl	(Italy) 2006 Turin	Biathlon	Women's mass start
Gold	Magdalena Neuner	(Canada) 2010 Vancouver	Biathlon	Women's pursuit
Gold	Magdalena Neuner	(Canada) 2010 Vancouver	Biathlon	Women's mass start
Silver	Magdalena Neuner	(Canada) 2010 Vancouver	Biathlon	Women's sprint
Bronze	Simone Hauswald	(Canada) 2010 Vancouver	Biathlon	Women's mass start
Bronze	Kati Wilhelm; Simone Hauswald; Martina Beck; Andrea Henkel	(Canada) 2010 Vancouver	Biathlon	Women's relay
Gold	Erik Lesser; Daniel Böhm; Arnd Peiffer; Simon Schempp	(Russia) 2014 Sochi	Biathlon	Men's relay
Silver	Erik Lesser	(Russia) 2014 Sochi	Biathlon	Men's individual
Gold	Arnd Peiffer	(South Korea) 2018 Pyeongchang	Biathlon	Men's sprint
Gold	Laura Dahlmeier	(South Korea) 2018 Pyeongchang	Biathlon	Women's sprint
Gold	Laura Dahlmeier	(South Korea) 2018 Pyeongchang	Biathlon	Women's pursuit
Silver	Simon Schempp	(South Korea) 2018 Pyeongchang	Biathlon	Men's mass start
Bronze	Benedikt Doll	(South Korea) 2018 Pyeongchang	Biathlon	Men's pursuit
Bronze	Erik Lesser; Benedikt Doll; Arnd Peiffer; Simon Schempp	(South Korea) 2018 Pyeongchang	Biathlon	Men's relay
Bronze	Laura Dahlmeier	(South Korea) 2018 Pyeongchang	Biathlon	Women's individual
Gold	Denise Herrmann	(China) 2022 Beijing	Biathlon	Women's individual
Bronze	Vanessa Voigt; Vanessa Hinz; Franziska Preuß; Denise Herrmann	(China) 2022 Beijing	Biathlon	Women's relay
Bronze	Justus Strelow; Philipp Nawrath; Vanessa Voigt; Franziska Preuß	(Italy) 2026 Milano Cortina	Biathlon	Mixed relay

=== Bobsleigh ===
Medal	Name	Games	Sport	Event
Bronze	Hanns Kilian; Valentin Krempl; Hans Hess; Sebastian Huber; Hanns Nägle	(Switzerland) 1928 St. Moritz	Bobsleigh	Five-man
Bronze	Hanns Kilian; Max Ludwig; Hans Mehlhorn; Sebastian Huber	(United States) 1932 Lake Placid	Bobsleigh	Five-man
Gold	Andreas Ostler; Lorenz Nieberl	(Norway) 1952 Oslo	Bobsleigh	Two-man
Gold	Andreas Ostler; Friedrich Kuhn; Lorenz Nieberl; Franz Kemser	(Norway) 1952 Oslo	Bobsleigh	Four-man
Silver	Horst Floth; Pepi Bader (FRG)	(France) 1968 Grenoble	Bobsleigh	Two-man
Gold	Wolfgang Zimmerer; Peter Utzschneider (FRG)	(Japan) 1972 Sapporo	Bobsleigh	Two-man
Silver	Horst Floth; Pepi Bader (FRG)	(Japan) 1972 Sapporo	Bobsleigh	Two-man
Bronze	Wolfgang Zimmerer; Stefan Gaisreiter; Walter Steinbauer; Peter Utzschneider (FRG)	(Japan) 1972 Sapporo	Bobsleigh	Four-man
Gold	Meinhard Nehmer; Bernhard Germeshausen (GDR)	(Austria) 1976 Innsbruck	Bobsleigh	Two-man
Gold	Meinhard Nehmer; Jochen Babock; Bernhard Germeshausen; Bernhard Lehmann (GDR)	(Austria) 1976 Innsbruck	Bobsleigh	Four-man
Silver	Wolfgang Zimmerer; Manfred Schumann (FRG)	(Austria) 1976 Innsbruck	Bobsleigh	Two-man
Bronze	Wolfgang Zimmerer; Peter Utzschneider; Bodo Bittner; Manfred Schumann (FRG)	(Austria) 1976 Innsbruck	Bobsleigh	Four-man
Gold	Meinhard Nehmer; Bernhard Germeshausen; Bogdan Musiol; Hans-Jürgen Gerhardt (GDR)	(United States) 1980 Lake Placid	Bobsleigh	Four-man
Silver	Bernhard Germeshausen; Hans-Jürgen Gerhardt (GDR)	(United States) 1980 Lake Placid	Bobsleigh	Two-man
Bronze	Meinhard Nehmer; Bogdan Musiol (GDR)	(United States) 1980 Lake Placid	Bobsleigh	Two-man
Bronze	Horst Schönau; Roland Wetzig; Detlef Richter; Andreas Kirchner (GDR)	(United States) 1980 Lake Placid	Bobsleigh	Four-man
Gold	Wolfgang Hoppe; Dietmar Schauerhammer (GDR)	(Socialist Federal Republic of Yugoslavia) 1984 Sarajevo	Bobsleigh	Two-man
Gold	Wolfgang Hoppe; Roland Wetzig; Dietmar Schauerhammer; Andreas Kirchner (GDR)	(Socialist Federal Republic of Yugoslavia) 1984 Sarajevo	Bobsleigh	Four-man
Silver	Bernhard Lehmann; Bogdan Musiol (GDR)	(Socialist Federal Republic of Yugoslavia) 1984 Sarajevo	Bobsleigh	Two-man
Silver	Bernhard Lehmann; Bogdan Musiol; Ingo Voge; Eberhard Weise (GDR)	(Socialist Federal Republic of Yugoslavia) 1984 Sarajevo	Bobsleigh	Four-man
Silver	Wolfgang Hoppe; Bogdan Musiol (GDR)	(Canada) 1988 Calgary	Bobsleigh	Two-man
Silver	Wolfgang Hoppe; Dietmar Schauerhammer; Bogdan Musiol; Ingo Voge (GDR)	(Canada) 1988 Calgary	Bobsleigh	Four-man
Bronze	Bernhard Lehmann; Mario Hoyer (GDR)	(Canada) 1988 Calgary	Bobsleigh	Two-man
Silver	Rudi Lochner; Markus Zimmermann	(France) 1992 Albertville	Bobsleigh	Two-man
Silver	Wolfgang Hoppe; Bogdan Musiol; Axel Kühn; René Hannemann	(France) 1992 Albertville	Bobsleigh	Four-man
Bronze	Christoph Langen; Günther Eger	(France) 1992 Albertville	Bobsleigh	Two-man
Gold	Harald Czudaj; Karsten Brannasch; Olaf Hampel; Alexander Szelig	(Norway) 1994 Lillehammer	Bobsleigh	Four-man
Bronze	Wolfgang Hoppe; Ulf Hielscher; René Hannemann; Carsten Embach	(Norway) 1994 Lillehammer	Bobsleigh	Four-man
Gold	Christoph Langen; Markus Zimmermann; Marco Jakobs; Olaf Hampel	(Japan) 1998 Nagano	Bobsleigh	Four-man
Bronze	Christoph Langen; Markus Zimmermann	(Japan) 1998 Nagano	Bobsleigh	Two-man
Gold	Christoph Langen; Markus Zimmermann	(United States) 2002 Salt Lake City	Bobsleigh	Two-man
Gold	André Lange; Enrico Kühn; Kevin Kuske; Carsten Embach	(United States) 2002 Salt Lake City	Bobsleigh	Four-man
Silver	Sandra Prokoff; Ulrike Holzner	(United States) 2002 Salt Lake City	Bobsleigh	Two-woman
Bronze	Susi Erdmann; Nicole Herschmann	(United States) 2002 Salt Lake City	Bobsleigh	Two-woman
Gold	André Lange; Kevin Kuske	(Italy) 2006 Turin	Bobsleigh	Two-man
Gold	Sandra Kiriasis; Anja Schneiderheinze	(Italy) 2006 Turin	Bobsleigh	Two-woman
Gold	André Lange; René Hoppe; Kevin Kuske; Martin Putze	(Italy) 2006 Turin	Bobsleigh	Four-man
Gold	André Lange; Kevin Kuske	(Canada) 2010 Vancouver	Bobsleigh	Two-man
Silver	Thomas Florschütz; Richard Adjei	(Canada) 2010 Vancouver	Bobsleigh	Two-man
Silver	André Lange; Kevin Kuske; Alexander Rödiger; Martin Putze	(Canada) 2010 Vancouver	Bobsleigh	Four-man
Gold	Francesco Friedrich; Thorsten Margis	(South Korea) 2018 Pyeongchang	Bobsleigh	Two-man
Gold	Mariama Jamanka; Lisa Buckwitz	(South Korea) 2018 Pyeongchang	Bobsleigh	Two-woman
Gold	Francesco Friedrich; Candy Bauer; Martin Grothkopp; Thorsten Margis	(South Korea) 2018 Pyeongchang	Bobsleigh	Four-man
Silver	Nico Walther; Kevin Kuske; Alexander Rödiger; Eric Franke	(South Korea) 2018 Pyeongchang	Bobsleigh	Four-man
Gold	Francesco Friedrich; Thorsten Margis	(China) 2022 Beijing	Bobsleigh	Two-man
Gold	Laura Nolte; Deborah Levi	(China) 2022 Beijing	Bobsleigh	Two-woman
Gold	Francesco Friedrich; Thorsten Margis; Candy Bauer; Alexander Schüller	(China) 2022 Beijing	Bobsleigh	Four-man
Silver	Johannes Lochner; Florian Bauer	(China) 2022 Beijing	Bobsleigh	Two-man
Silver	Mariama Jamanka; Alexandra Burghardt	(China) 2022 Beijing	Bobsleigh	Two-woman
Silver	Johannes Lochner; Florian Bauer; Christopher Weber; Christian Rasp	(China) 2022 Beijing	Bobsleigh	Four-man
Bronze	Christoph Hafer; Matthias Sommer	(China) 2022 Beijing	Bobsleigh	Two-man
Gold	Johannes Lochner; Georg Fleischhauer	(Italy) 2026 Milano-Cortina	Bobsleigh	Two-man
Silver	Laura Nolte	(Italy) 2026 Milano-Cortina	Bobsleigh	Women's Monobob
Silver	Francesco Friedrich; Alexander Schüller	(Italy) 2026 Milano-Cortina	Bobsleigh	Two-man
Bronze	Adam Ammour; Alexander Schaller	(Italy) 2026 Milano-Cortina	Bobsleigh	Two-man
Gold	Laura Nolte; Deborah Levi	(Italy) 2026 Milano-Cortina	Bobsleigh	Two-woman
Silver	Lisa Buckwitz; Neele Schuten	(Italy) 2026 Milano-Cortina	Bobsleigh	Two-woman

=== Cross-country skiing ===
Medal	Name	Games	Sport	Event
Silver	Gert-Dietmar Klause (GDR)	(Austria) 1976 Innsbruck	Cross-country skiing	Men's 50 km
Bronze	Monika Debertshäuser; Sigrun Krause; Barbara Petzold; Veronika Hesse (GDR)	(Austria) 1976 Innsbruck	Cross-country skiing	Women's 4×5 km relay
Gold	Barbara Petzold (GDR)	(United States) 1980 Lake Placid	Cross-country skiing	Women's 10 km
Gold	Marlies Rostock; Carola Anding; Barbara Petzold; Veronika Hesse (GDR)	(United States) 1980 Lake Placid	Cross-country skiing	Women's 4×5 km relay
Gold	Manuela Henkel; Viola Bauer; Claudia Künzel; Evi Sachenbacher	(United States) 2002 Salt Lake City	Cross-country skiing	Women's 4×5 km relay
Silver	Peter Schlickenrieder	(United States) 2002 Salt Lake City	Cross-country skiing	Men's sprint
Silver	Evi Sachenbacher	(United States) 2002 Salt Lake City	Cross-country skiing	Women's sprint
Bronze	Jens Filbrich; Andreas Schlütter; Tobias Angerer; René Sommerfeldt	(United States) 2002 Salt Lake City	Cross-country skiing	Men's 4× 10 km relay
Bronze	Viola Bauer	(United States) 2002 Salt Lake City	Cross-country skiing	Women's 2x5 km pursuit
Silver	Andreas Schlütter; Jens Filbrich; René Sommerfeldt; Tobias Angerer	(Italy) 2006 Turin	Cross-country skiing	Men's 4× 10 km relay
Silver	Stefanie Böhler; Viola Bauer; Evi Sachenbacher-Stehle; Claudia Künzel	(Italy) 2006 Turin	Cross-country skiing	Women's 4×5 km relay
Silver	Claudia Künzel	(Italy) 2006 Turin	Cross-country skiing	Women's sprint
Bronze	Tobias Angerer	(Italy) 2006 Turin	Cross-country skiing	Men's 15 km
Gold	Evi Sachenbacher-Stehle; Claudia Nystad	(Canada) 2010 Vancouver	Cross-country skiing	Women's team sprint
Silver	Tobias Angerer	(Canada) 2010 Vancouver	Cross-country skiing	Men's 30 km pursuit
Silver	Axel Teichmann	(Canada) 2010 Vancouver	Cross-country skiing	Men's 50 km
Silver	Tim Tscharnke; Axel Teichmann	(Canada) 2010 Vancouver	Cross-country skiing	Men's team sprint
Silver	Katrin Zeller; Evi Sachenbacher-Stehle; Miriam Gössner; Claudia Nystad	(Canada) 2010 Vancouver	Cross-country skiing	Women's 4 x 5 km relay
Bronze	Nicole Fessel; Stefanie Böhler; Claudia Nystad; Denise Herrmann	(Russia) 2014 Sochi	Cross-country skiing	Women's 4 x 5 km relay
Gold	Katharina Hennig; Victoria Carl	(China) 2022 Beijing	Cross-country skiing	Women's team sprint
Silver	Katherine Sauerbrey; Katharina Hennig; Victoria Carl; Sofie Krehl	(China) 2022 Beijing	Cross-country skiing	Women's 4 × 5 km relay
Bronze	Laura Gimmler; Coletta Rydzek	(Italy) 2026 Milano-Cortina	Cross-country skiing	Women's team sprint

=== Figure skating ===
Medal	Name	Games	Sport	Event
Gold	Anna Hübler; Heinrich Burger	(United Kingdom) 1908 London	Figure skating	Pair skating
Silver	Elsa Rendschmidt	(United Kingdom) 1908 London	Figure skating	Ladies' singles
Gold	Maxi Herber; Ernst Baier	(Germany) 1936 Garmisch-Partenkirchen	Figure skating	Pair skating
Silver	Ernst Baier	(Germany) 1936 Garmisch-Partenkirchen	Figure skating	Men's singles
Gold	Ria Baran; Paul Falk	(Norway) 1952 Oslo	Figure skating	Pair skating
Silver	Marika Kilius; Hans-Jürgen Bäumler (EUA)	(United States) 1960 Squaw Valley	Figure skating	Pair skating
Gold	Manfred Schnelldorfer (EUA)	(Austria) 1964 Innsbruck	Figure skating	Men's singles
Silver	Marika Kilius; Hans-Jürgen Bäumler (EUA)	(Austria) 1964 Innsbruck	Figure skating	Pair skating
Silver	Gabriele Seyfert (GDR)	(France) 1968 Grenoble	Figure skating	Ladies' singles
Bronze	Margot Glockshuber; Wolfgang Danne (FRG)	(France) 1968 Grenoble	Figure skating	Pair skating
Bronze	Manuela Groß; Uwe Kagelmann (GDR)	(Japan) 1972 Sapporo	Figure skating	Pair skating
Silver	Romy Kermer; Rolf Österreich (GDR)	(Austria) 1976 Innsbruck	Figure skating	Pair skating
Bronze	Christine Errath (GDR)	(Austria) 1968 Innsburck	Figure skating	Ladies' singles
Bronze	Manuela Groß; Uwe Kagelmann (GDR)	(Austria) 1976 Innsbruck	Figure skating	Pair skating
Gold	Anett Pötzsch (GDR)	(United States) 1980 Lake Placid	Figure skating	Ladies' singles
Silver	Jan Hoffmann (GDR)	(United States) 1980 Lake Placid	Figure skating	Men's singles
Bronze	Dagmar Lurz (FRG)	(United States) 1980 Lake Placid	Figure skating	Ladies' singles
Bronze	Manuela Mager; Uwe Bewersdorf (GDR)	(United States) 1980 Lake Placid	Figure skating	Pair skating
Gold	Katarina Witt (GDR)	(Socialist Federal Republic of Yugoslavia) 1984 Sarajevo	Figure skating	Ladies' singles
Gold	Katarina Witt (GDR)	(Canada) 1988 Calgary	Figure skating	Ladies' singles
Bronze	Mandy Wötzel; Ingo Steuer	(Japan) 1998 Nagano	Figure skating	Pair skating
Bronze	Aliona Savchenko; Robin Szolkowy	(Canada) 2010 Vancouver	Figure skating	Pair skating
Bronze	Aliona Savchenko; Robin Szolkowy	(Russia) 2014 Sochi	Figure skating	Pair skating
Gold	Aliona Savchenko; Bruno Massot	(South Korea) 2018 Pyeongchang	Figure skating	Pair skating
Bronze	Minerva Hase; Nikita Volodin	(Italy) 2026 Milano-Cortina	Figure skating	Pair skating

=== Freestyle skiing ===
Medal	Name	Games	Sport	Event
Silver	Tatjana Mittermayer	(Japan) 1998 Nagano	Freestyle skiing	Women's moguls
Bronze	Daniela Maier	(China) 2022 Beijing	Freestyle skiing	Women's ski cross
Gold	Daniela Maier	(Italy) 2026 Milano-Cortina	Freestyle skiing	Women's ski cross

=== Ice hockey ===
Medal	Name	Games	Sport	Event
Bronze	Germany national team: Rudi Ball Alfred Heinrich Erich Herker Gustav Jaenecke Werner Korff Walter Leinweber Erich Römer Martin Schröttle Marquardt Slevogt Georg Strobl	(United States) 1932 Lake Placid	Ice hockey	Men's tournament
Bronze	West Germany national team: Klaus Auhuber Ignaz Berndaner Wolfgang Boos Lorenz Funk Martin Hinterstocker Udo Kiessling Walter Köberle Ernst Köpf Anton Kehle Erich Kühnhackl Stefan Metz Franz Reindl Rainer Philipp Alois Schloder Rudolf Thanner Josef Völk Ferenc Vozar Erich Weishaupt	(Austria) 1976 Innsbruck	Ice hockey	Men's tournament
Silver	Germany national team: Sinan Akdag Danny aus den Birken Daryl Boyle Christian Ehrhoff Yasin Ehliz Dennis Endras Gerrit Fauser Marcel Goc Patrick Hager Frank Hördler Dominik Kahun Marcus Kink Brooks Macek Frank Mauer Jonas Müller Moritz Müller Marcel Noebels Leonhard Pföderl Timo Pielmeier Matthias Plachta Patrick Reimer Felix Schütz Yannic Seidenberg David Wolf	(South Korea) 2018 Pyeongchang	Ice hockey	Men's tournament

=== Luge ===
Medal	Name	Games	Sport	Event
Gold	Thomas Köhler (EUA)	(Austria) 1964 Innsbruck	Luge	Men's singles
Gold	Ortrun Enderlein (EUA)	(Austria) 1964 Innsbruck	Luge	Women's singles
Silver	Klaus-Michael Bonsack (EUA)	(Austria) 1964 Innsbruck	Luge	Men's singles
Silver	Ilse Geisler (EUA)	(Austria) 1964 Innsbruck	Luge	Women's singles
Bronze	Hans Plenk (EUA)	(Austria) 1964 Innsbruck	Luge	Men's singles
Gold	Klaus-Michael Bonsack; Thomas Köhler (GDR)	(France) 1968 Grenoble	Luge	Doubles
Silver	Thomas Köhler (GDR)	(France) 1968 Grenoble	Luge	Men's singles
Silver	Christa Schmuck (FRG)	(France) 1968 Grenoble	Luge	Women's singles
Bronze	Klaus-Michael Bonsack (GDR)	(France) 1968 Grenoble	Luge	Men's singles
Bronze	Angelika Dünhaupt (FRG)	(France) 1968 Grenoble	Luge	Women's singles
Bronze	Wolfgang Winkler; Fritz Nachmann (FRG)	(France) 1968 Grenoble	Luge	Doubles
Gold	Wolfgang Scheidel (GDR)	(Japan) 1972 Sapporo	Luge	Men's singles
Gold	Anna-Maria Müller (GDR)	(Japan) 1972 Sapporo	Luge	Women's singles
Gold	Horst Hörnlein; Reinhard Bredow (GDR)	(Japan) 1972 Sapporo	Luge	Doubles
Silver	Harald Ehrig (GDR)	(Japan) 1972 Sapporo	Luge	Men's singles
Silver	Ute Rührold (GDR)	(Japan) 1972 Sapporo	Luge	Women's singles
Bronze	Wolfram Fiedler (GDR)	(Japan) 1972 Sapporo	Luge	Men's singles
Bronze	Margit Schumann (GDR)	(Japan) 1972 Sapporo	Luge	Women's singles
Bronze	Klaus-Michael Bonsack; Wolfram Fiedler (GDR)	(Japan) 1972 Sapporo	Luge	Doubles
Gold	Dettlef Günther (GDR)	(Austria) 1976 Innsbruck	Luge	Men's singles
Gold	Margit Schumann (GDR)	(Austria) 1976 Innsbruck	Luge	Women's singles
Gold	Hans Rinn; Norbert Hahn (GDR)	(Austria) 1976 Innsbruck	Luge	Doubles
Silver	Josef Fendt (FRG)	(Austria) 1976 Innsbruck	Luge	Men's singles
Silver	Ute Rührold (GDR)	(Austria) 1976 Innsbruck	Luge	Women's singles
Silver	Hans Brandner; Balthasar Schwarm (FRG)	(Austria) 1976 Innsbruck	Luge	Doubles
Bronze	Hans Rinn (GDR)	(Austria) 1976 Innsbruck	Luge	Men's singles
Bronze	Elisabeth Demleitner (FRG)	(Austria) 1976 Innsbruck	Luge	Women's singles
Gold	Bernhard Glass (GDR)	(United States) 1980 Lake Placid	Luge	Men's singles
Gold	Hans Rinn; Norbert Hahn (GDR)	(United States) 1980 Lake Placid	Luge	Doubles
Silver	Melitta Sollmann (GDR)	(United States) 1980 Lake Placid	Luge	Women's singles
Bronze	Anton Winkler (FRG)	(United States) 1980 Lake Placid	Luge	Men's singles
Gold	Steffi Martin (GDR)	(Socialist Federal Republic of Yugoslavia) 1984 Sarajevo	Luge	Women's singles
Gold	Hans Stanggassinger; Franz Wembacher (FRG)	(Socialist Federal Republic of Yugoslavia) 1984 Sarajevo	Luge	Doubles
Silver	Bettina Schmidt (GDR)	(Socialist Federal Republic of Yugoslavia) 1984 Sarajevo	Luge	Women's singles
Bronze	Ute Weiß (GDR)	(Socialist Federal Republic of Yugoslavia) 1984 Sarajevo	Luge	Women's singles
Bronze	Jörg Hoffmann; Jochen Pietzsch (GDR)	(Socialist Federal Republic of Yugoslavia) 1984 Sarajevo	Luge	Doubles
Gold	Jens Müller (GDR)	(Canada) 1988 Calgary	Luge	Men's singles
Gold	Steffi Walter (GDR)	(Canada) 1988 Calgary	Luge	Women's singles
Gold	Jörg Hoffmann; Jochen Pietzsch (GDR)	(Canada) 1988 Calgary	Luge	Doubles
Silver	Georg Hackl (FRG)	(Canada) 1988 Calgary	Luge	Men's singles
Silver	Ute Oberhoffner (GDR)	(Canada) 1988 Calgary	Luge	Women's singles
Silver	Stefan Krauße; Jan Behrendt (GDR)	(Canada) 1988 Calgary	Luge	Doubles
Bronze	Cerstin Schmidt (GDR)	(Canada) 1988 Calgary	Luge	Women's singles
Bronze	Thomas Schwab; Wolfgang Staudinger (FRG)	(Canada) 1988 Calgary	Luge	Doubles
Gold	Georg Hackl	(France) 1992 Albertville	Luge	Men's singles
Gold	Stefan Krauße; Jan Behrendt	(France) 1992 Albertville	Luge	Doubles
Silver	Yves Mankel; Thomas Rudolph	(France) 1992 Albertville	Luge	Doubles
Bronze	Susi Erdmann	(France) 1992 Albertville	Luge	Women's singles
Gold	Georg Hackl	(Norway) 1994 Lillehammer	Luge	Men's singles
Silver	Susi Erdmann	(Norway) 1994 Lillehammer	Luge	Women's singles
Bronze	Stefan Krauße; Jan Behrendt	(Norway) 1994 Lillehammer	Luge	Doubles
Gold	Georg Hackl	(Japan) 1998 Nagano	Luge	Men's singles
Gold	Sylke Otto	(Japan) 1998 Nagano	Luge	Women's singles
Gold	Stefan Krauße; Jan Behrendt	(Japan) 1998 Nagano	Luge	Doubles
Silver	Barbara Niedernhuber	(Japan) 1998 Nagano	Luge	Women's singles
Bronze	Jens Müller	(Japan) 1998 Nagano	Luge	Men's singles
Gold	Sylke Otto	(United States) 2002 Salt Lake City	Luge	Women's singles
Gold	Patric Leitner; Alexander Resch	(United States) 2002 Salt Lake City	Luge	Doubles
Silver	Georg Hackl	(United States) 2002 Salt Lake City	Luge	Men's singles
Silver	Barbara Niedernhuber	(United States) 2002 Salt Lake City	Luge	Women's singles
Bronze	Silke Kraushaar	(United States) 2002 Salt Lake City	Luge	Women's singles
Gold	Sylke Otto	(Italy) 2006 Turin	Luge	Women's singles
Silver	Silke Kraushaar	(Italy) 2006 Turin	Luge	Women's singles
Silver	André Florschütz; Torsten Wustlich	(Italy) 2006 Turin	Luge	Doubles
Bronze	Tatjana Hüfner	(Italy) 2006 Turin	Luge	Women's singles
Gold	Felix Loch	(Canada) 2010 Vancouver	Luge	Men's singles
Gold	Tatjana Hüfner	(Canada) 2010 Vancouver	Luge	Women's singles
Silver	David Möller	(Canada) 2010 Vancouver	Luge	Men's singles
Bronze	Natalie Geisenberger	(Canada) 2010 Vancouver	Luge	Women's singles
Bronze	Patric Leitner; Alexander Resch	(Canada) 2010 Vancouver	Luge	Men's singles
Gold	Felix Loch	(Russia) 2014 Sochi	Luge	Men's singles
Gold	Natalie Geisenberger	(Russia) 2014 Sochi	Luge	Women's singles
Gold	Tobias Wendl; Tobias Arlt	(Russia) 2014 Sochi	Luge	Doubles
Gold	Natalie Geisenberger; Felix Loch; Tobias Wendl; Tobias Arlt	(Russia) 2014 Sochi	Luge	Team relay
Silver	Tatjana Hüfner	(Russia) 2014 Sochi	Luge	Women's singles
Gold	Natalie Geisenberger	(South Korea) 2018 Pyeongchang	Luge	Women's singles
Gold	Tobias Wendl; Tobias Arlt	(South Korea) 2018 Pyeongchang	Luge	Doubles
Gold	Natalie Geisenberger; Johannes Ludwig; Tobias Wendl; Tobias Arlt	(South Korea) 2018 Pyeongchang	Luge	Team relay
Silver	Dajana Eitberger	(South Korea) 2018 Pyeongchang	Luge	Women's singles
Bronze	Johannes Ludwig	(South Korea) 2018 Pyeongchang	Luge	Men's singles
Bronze	Toni Eggert; Sascha Benecken	(South Korea) 2018 Pyeongchang	Luge	Doubles
Gold	Johannes Ludwig	(China) 2022 Beijing	Luge	Men's singles
Gold	Natalie Geisenberger	(China) 2022 Beijing	Luge	Women's singles
Gold	Tobias Wendl; Tobias Arlt	(China) 2022 Beijing	Luge	Doubles
Gold	Natalie Geisenberger; Johannes Ludwig; Tobias Wendl; Tobias Arlt	(China) 2022 Beijing	Luge	Team relay
Silver	Anna Berreiter	(China) 2022 Beijing	Luge	Women's singles
Silver	Toni Eggert; Sascha Benecken	(China) 2022 Beijing	Luge	Doubles
Gold	Max Langenhan	(Italy) 2026 Milano Cortina	Luge	Men's singles
Gold	Julia Taubitz	(Italy) 2026 Milano Cortina	Luge	Women's singles
Gold	Julia Taubitz; Tobias Wendl; Tobias Arlt; Max Langenhan; Dajana Eitberger; Magdalena Matschina	(Italy) 2026 Milano Cortina	Luge	Team relay
Silver	Dajana Eitberger; Magdalena Matschina	(Italy) 2026 Milano Cortina	Luge	Women's doubles
Bronze	Tobias Wendl; Tobias Arlt	(Italy) 2026 Milano Cortina	Luge	Men's doubles

=== Nordic combined ===
Medal	Name	Games	Sport	Event
Gold	Georg Thoma (EUA)	(United States) 1960 Squaw Valley	Nordic combined	15 km individual normal hill
Bronze	Georg Thoma (EUA)	(Austria) 1964 Innsbruck	Nordic combined	15 km individual normal hill
Gold	Franz Keller (FRG)	(France) 1968 Grenoble	Nordic combined	15 km individual normal hill
Bronze	Andreas Kunz (GDR)	(France) 1968 Grenoble	Nordic combined	15 km individual normal hill
Gold	Ulrich Wehling (GDR)	(Japan) 1972 Sapporo	Nordic combined	15 km individual normal hill
Bronze	Karl-Heinz Luck (GDR)	(Japan) 1972 Sapporo	Nordic combined	15 km individual normal hill
Gold	Ulrich Wehling (GDR)	(Austria) 1976 Innsbruck	Nordic combined	15 km individual normal hill
Silver	Urban Hettich (FRG)	(Austria) 1976 Innsbruck	Nordic combined	15 km individual normal hill
Bronze	Konrad Winkler (GDR)	(Austria) 1976 Innsbruck	Nordic combined	15 km individual normal hill
Gold	Ulrich Wehling (GDR)	(United States) 1980 Lake Placid	Nordic combined	15 km individual normal hill
Bronze	Konrad Winkler (GDR)	(United States) 1980 Lake Placid	Nordic combined	15 km individual normal hill
Gold	Hans-Peter Pohl; Hubert Schwarz; Thomas Müller (FRG)	(Canada) 1988 Calgary	Nordic combined	3× 10 km team
Silver	Ronny Ackermann	(United States) 2002 Salt Lake City	Nordic combined	Sprint
Silver	Björn Kircheisen; Georg Hettich; Marcel Höhlig; Ronny Ackermann	(United States) 2002 Salt Lake City	Nordic combined	4 × 5 km team
Gold	Georg Hettich	(Italy) 2006 Turin	Nordic combined	15 km individual normal hill
Silver	Björn Kircheisen; Georg Hettich; Ronny Ackermann; Jens Gaiser	(Italy) 2006 Turin	Nordic combined	4 × 5 km team
Bronze	Georg Hettich	(Italy) 2006 Turin	Nordic combined	Sprint
Bronze	Johannes Rydzek; Tino Edelmann; Eric Frenzel; Björn Kircheisen	(Canada) 2010 Vancouver	Nordic combined	4 × 5 km team large hill
Gold	Eric Frenzel	(Russia) 2014 Sochi	Nordic combined	10 km individual normal hill
Silver	Eric Frenzel; Björn Kircheisen; Fabian Rießle; Johannes Rydzek	(Russia) 2014 Sochi	Nordic combined	4 × 5 km team large hill
Bronze	Fabian Rießle	(Russia) 2014 Sochi	Nordic combined	10 km individual large hill
Gold	Eric Frenzel	(South Korea) 2018 Pyeongchang	Nordic combined	10 km individual normal hill
Gold	Vinzenz Geiger; Fabian Rießle; Eric Frenzel; Johannes Rydzek	(South Korea) 2018 Pyeongchang	Nordic combined	4 × 5 km team large hill
Gold	Johannes Rydzek	(South Korea) 2018 Pyeongchang	Nordic combined	10 km individual large hill
Silver	Fabian Rießle	(South Korea) 2018 Pyeongchang	Nordic combined	10 km individual large hill
Bronze	Eric Frenzel	(South Korea) 2018 Pyeongchang	Nordic combined	10 km individual large hill
Gold	Vinzenz Geiger	(China) 2022 Beijing	Nordic combined	10 km individual normal hill
Silver	Manuel Faißt; Eric Frenzel; Vinzenz Geiger; Julian Schmid	(China) 2022 Beijing	Nordic combined	4 × 5 km team large hill

=== Skeleton ===
Medal	Name	Games	Sport	Event
Silver	Kerstin Szymkowiak	(Canada) 2010 Vancouver	Skeleton	Women's
Bronze	Anja Huber	(Canada) 2010 Vancouver	Skeleton	Women's
Silver	Jacqueline Lölling	(South Korea) 2018 Pyeongchang	Skeleton	Women's
Gold	Christopher Grotheer	(China) 2022 Beijing	Skeleton	Men's
Gold	Hannah Neise	(China) 2022 Beijing	Skeleton	Women's
Silver	Axel Jungk	(China) 2022 Beijing	Skeleton	Men's
Silver	Axel Jungk	(Italy) 2026 Milano-Cortina	Skeleton	Men's
Silver	Susanne Kreher	(Italy) 2026 Milano-Cortina	Skeleton	Women's
Silver	Susanne Kreher; Axel Jungk	(Italy) 2026 Milano-Cortina	Skeleton	Mixed team
Bronze	Christopher Grotheer	(Italy) 2026 Milano-Cortina	Skeleton	Men's
Bronze	Jacqueline Pfeifer	(Italy) 2026 Milano-Cortina	Skeleton	Women's
Bronze	Jacqueline Pfeifer; Christopher Grotheer	(Italy) 2026 Milano-Cortina	Skeleton	Mixed team

=== Ski jumping ===
Medal	Name	Games	Sport	Event
Bronze	Harry Glaß (EUA)	(Italy) 1956 Cortina d'Ampezzo	Ski jumping	Men's normal hill individual
Gold	Helmut Recknagel (EUA)	(United States) 1960 Squaw Valley	Ski jumping	Men's normal hill individual
Bronze	Rainer Schmidt (GDR)	(Japan) 1972 Sapporo	Ski jumping	Men's large hill individual
Gold	Hans-Georg Aschenbach (GDR)	(Austria) 1976 Innsbruck	Ski jumping	Men's normal hill individual
Silver	Jochen Danneberg (GDR)	(Austria) 1976 Innsbruck	Ski jumping	Men's normal hill individual
Bronze	Henry Glaß (GDR)	(Austria) 1976 Innsbruck	Ski jumping	Men's large hill individual
Silver	Manfred Deckert (GDR)	(United States) 1980 Lake Placid	Ski jumping	Men's normal hill individual
Gold	Jens Weißflog (GDR)	(Socialist Federal Republic of Yugoslavia) 1984 Sarajevo	Ski jumping	Men's normal hill individual
Silver	Jens Weißflog (GDR)	(Socialist Federal Republic of Yugoslavia) 1984 Sarajevo	Ski jumping	Men's large hill individual
Gold	Jens Weißflog	(Norway) 1994 Lillehammer	Ski jumping	Men's large hill individual
Gold	Hansjörg Jäkle; Christof Duffner; Dieter Thoma; Jens Weißflog	(Norway) 1994 Lillehammer	Ski jumping	Men's large hill team
Bronze	Dieter Thoma	(Norway) 1994 Lillehammer	Ski jumping	Men's normal hill individual
Silver	Sven Hannawald; Martin Schmitt; Hansjörg Jäkle; Dieter Thoma	(Japan) 1998 Nagano	Ski jumping	Men's large hill team
Gold	Sven Hannawald; Stephan Hocke; Michael Uhrmann; Martin Schmitt	(United States) 2002 Salt Lake City	Ski jumping	Men's large hill team
Silver	Sven Hannawald	(United States) 2002 Salt Lake City	Ski jumping	Men's normal hill individual
Silver	Michael Neumayer; Andreas Wank; Martin Schmitt; Michael Uhrmann	(Canada) 2010 Vancouver	Ski jumping	Men's large hill team
Gold	Andreas Wank; Marinus Kraus; Andreas Wellinger; Severin Freund	(Russia) 2014 Sochi	Ski jumping	Men's large hill team
Gold	Carina Vogt	(Russia) 2014 Sochi	Ski jumping	Women's normal hill individual
Gold	Andreas Wellinger	(South Korea) 2018 Pyeongchang	Ski jumping	Men's normal hill individual
Silver	Katharina Althaus	(South Korea) 2018 Pyeongchang	Ski jumping	Women's normal hill individual
Silver	Andreas Wellinger	(South Korea) 2018 Pyeongchang	Ski jumping	Men's large hill individual
Silver	Karl Geiger; Stephan Leyhe; Richard Freitag; Andreas Wellinger	(South Korea) 2018 Pyeongchang	Ski jumping	Men's large hill team
Silver	Katharina Althaus	(China) 2022 Beijing	Ski jumping	Women's normal hill individual
Bronze	Karl Geiger	(China) 2022 Beijing	Ski jumping	Men's large hill individual
Bronze	Constantin Schmid; Stephan Leyhe; Markus Eisenbichler; Karl Geiger	(China) 2022 Beijing	Ski jumping	Men's large hill team
Gold	Philipp Raimund	(Italy) 2026 Milano Cortina	Ski jumping	Men's normal hill individual

=== Snowboarding ===
Medal	Name	Games	Sport	Event
Gold	Nicola Thost	(Japan) 1998 Nagano	Snowboarding	Women's halfpipe
Silver	Heidi Renoth	(Japan) 1998 Nagano	Snowboarding	Women's giant slalom
Silver	Amelie Kober	(Italy) 2006 Turin	Snowboarding	Women's parallel giant slalom
Silver	Anke Karstens	(Russia) 2014 Sochi	Snowboarding	Women's parallel slalom
Bronze	Amelie Kober	(Russia) 2014 Sochi	Snowboarding	Women's parallel slalom
Silver	Selina Jörg	(South Korea) 2018 Pyeongchang	Snowboarding	Women's parallel giant slalom
Bronze	Ramona Theresia Hofmeister	(South Korea) 2018 Pyeongchang	Snowboarding	Women's parallel giant slalom

=== Speed skating ===
Medal	Name	Games	Sport	Event
Gold	Helga Haase (EUA)	(United States) 1960 Squaw Valley	Speed skating	Women's 500 metres
Silver	Helga Haase (EUA)	(United States) 1960 Squaw Valley	Speed skating	Women's 1000 metres
Gold	Erhard Keller (FRG)	(France) 1968 Grenoble	Speed skating	Men's 500 metres
Gold	Erhard Keller (FRG)	(Japan) 1972 Sapporo	Speed skating	Men's 500 metres
Gold	Monika Pflug (FRG)	(Japan) 1972 Sapporo	Speed skating	Women's 1000 metres
Silver	Andrea Mitscherlich (GDR)	(Austria) 1976 Innsbruck	Speed skating	Women's 3000 metres
Gold	Karin Enke (GDR)	(United States) 1980 Lake Placid	Speed skating	Women's 500 metres
Silver	Sabine Becker (GDR)	(United States) 1980 Lake Placid	Speed skating	Women's 3000 metres
Bronze	Sylvia Albrecht (GDR)	(United States) 1980 Lake Placid	Speed skating	Women's 1000 metres
Bronze	Sabine Becker (GDR)	(United States) 1980 Lake Placid	Speed skating	Women's 1500 metres
Gold	Christa Rothenburger (GDR)	(Socialist Federal Republic of Yugoslavia) 1984 Sarajevo	Speed skating	Women's 500 metres
Gold	Karin Enke (GDR)	(Socialist Federal Republic of Yugoslavia) 1984 Sarajevo	Speed skating	Women's 1000 metres
Gold	Karin Enke (GDR)	(Socialist Federal Republic of Yugoslavia) 1984 Sarajevo	Speed skating	Women's 1500 metres
Gold	Andrea Schöne (GDR)	(Socialist Federal Republic of Yugoslavia) 1984 Sarajevo	Speed skating	Women's 3000 metres
Silver	Karin Enke (GDR)	(Socialist Federal Republic of Yugoslavia) 1984 Sarajevo	Speed skating	Women's 500 metres
Silver	Andrea Schöne (GDR)	(Socialist Federal Republic of Yugoslavia) 1984 Sarajevo	Speed skating	Women's 1000 metres
Silver	Andrea Schöne (GDR)	(Socialist Federal Republic of Yugoslavia) 1984 Sarajevo	Speed skating	Women's 1500 metres
Silver	Karin Enke (GDR)	(Socialist Federal Republic of Yugoslavia) 1984 Sarajevo	Speed skating	Women's 3000 metres
Bronze	René Schöfisch (GDR)	(Socialist Federal Republic of Yugoslavia) 1984 Sarajevo	Speed skating	Men's 5000 metres
Bronze	René Schöfisch (GDR)	(Socialist Federal Republic of Yugoslavia) 1984 Sarajevo	Speed skating	Men's 10,000 metres
Bronze	Gabi Zange (GDR)	(Socialist Federal Republic of Yugoslavia) 1984 Sarajevo	Speed skating	Women's 3000 metres
Gold	Uwe-Jens Mey (GDR)	(Canada) 1988 Calgary	Speed skating	Men's 500 metres
Gold	André Hoffmann (GDR)	(Canada) 1988 Calgary	Speed skating	Men's 1500 metres
Gold	Christa Rothenburger (GDR)	(Canada) 1988 Calgary	Speed skating	Women's 1000 metres
Silver	Uwe-Jens Mey (GDR)	(Canada) 1988 Calgary	Speed skating	Men's 1000 metres
Silver	Christa Rothenburger (GDR)	(Canada) 1988 Calgary	Speed skating	Women's 500 metres
Silver	Karin Kania (GDR)	(Canada) 1988 Calgary	Speed skating	Women's 1000 metres
Silver	Karin Kania (GDR)	(Canada) 1988 Calgary	Speed skating	Women's 1500 metres
Silver	Andrea Ehrig (GDR)	(Canada) 1988 Calgary	Speed skating	Women's 3000 metres
Silver	Andrea Ehrig (GDR)	(Canada) 1988 Calgary	Speed skating	Women's 5000 metres
Bronze	Andrea Ehrig (GDR)	(Canada) 1988 Calgary	Speed skating	Women's 1500 metres
Bronze	Gabi Zange (GDR)	(Canada) 1988 Calgary	Speed skating	Women's 3000 metres
Bronze	Gabi Zange (GDR)	(Canada) 1988 Calgary	Speed skating	Women's 5000 metres
Gold	Uwe-Jens Mey	(France) 1992 Albertville	Speed skating	Men's 500 metres
Gold	Olaf Zinke	(France) 1992 Albertville	Speed skating	Men's 1000 metres
Gold	Jacqueline Börner	(France) 1992 Albertville	Speed skating	Women's 1500 metres
Gold	Gunda Niemann	(France) 1992 Albertville	Speed skating	Women's 3000 metres
Gold	Gunda Niemann	(France) 1992 Albertville	Speed skating	Women's 5000 metres
Silver	Gunda Niemann	(France) 1992 Albertville	Speed skating	Women's 1500 metres
Silver	Heike Warnicke	(France) 1992 Albertville	Speed skating	Women's 3000 metres
Silver	Heike Warnicke	(France) 1992 Albertville	Speed skating	Women's 5000 metres
Bronze	Christa Luding	(France) 1992 Albertville	Speed skating	Women's 500 metres
Bronze	Monique Garbrecht	(France) 1992 Albertville	Speed skating	Women's 1000 metres
Bronze	Claudia Pechstein	(France) 1992 Albertville	Speed skating	Women's 5000 metres
Gold	Claudia Pechstein	(Norway) 1994 Lillehammer	Speed skating	Women's 5000 metres
Silver	Anke Baier	(Norway) 1994 Lillehammer	Speed skating	Women's 1000 metres
Silver	Gunda Niemann	(Norway) 1994 Lillehammer	Speed skating	Women's 5000 metres
Bronze	Franziska Schenk	(Norway) 1994 Lillehammer	Speed skating	Women's 500 metres
Bronze	Gunda Niemann	(Norway) 1994 Lillehammer	Speed skating	Women's 1500 metres
Bronze	Claudia Pechstein	(Norway) 1994 Lillehammer	Speed skating	Women's 3000 metres
Gold	Gunda Niemann-Stirnemann	(Japan) 1998 Nagano	Speed skating	Women's 3000 metres
Gold	Claudia Pechstein	(Japan) 1998 Nagano	Speed skating	Women's 5000 metres
Silver	Gunda Niemann-Stirnemann	(Japan) 1998 Nagano	Speed skating	Women's 1500 metres
Silver	Claudia Pechstein	(Japan) 1998 Nagano	Speed skating	Women's 3000 metres
Silver	Gunda Niemann-Stirnemann	(Japan) 1998 Nagano	Speed skating	Women's 5000 metres
Bronze	Anni Friesinger	(Japan) 1998 Nagano	Speed skating	Women's 3000 metres
Gold	Anni Friesinger	(United States) 2002 Salt Lake City	Speed skating	Women's 1500 metres
Gold	Claudia Pechstein	(United States) 2002 Salt Lake City	Speed skating	Women's 3000 metres
Gold	Claudia Pechstein	(United States) 2002 Salt Lake City	Speed skating	Women's 5000 metres
Silver	Monique Garbrecht-Enfeldt	(United States) 2002 Salt Lake City	Speed skating	Women's 500 metres
Silver	Sabine Völker	(United States) 2002 Salt Lake City	Speed skating	Women's 1000 metres
Silver	Sabine Völker	(United States) 2002 Salt Lake City	Speed skating	Women's 1500 metres
Bronze	Jens Boden	(United States) 2002 Salt Lake City	Speed skating	Men's 5000 metres
Bronze	Sabine Völker	(United States) 2002 Salt Lake City	Speed skating	Women's 500 metres
Gold	Daniela Anschütz-Thoms; Anni Friesinger; Lucille Opitz; Claudia Pechstein; Sabine Völker	(Italy) 2006 Turin	Speed skating	Women's team pursuit
Silver	Claudia Pechstein	(Italy) 2006 Turin	Speed skating	Women's 5000 metres
Bronze	Anni Friesinger	(Italy) 2006 Turin	Speed skating	Women's 1000 metres
Gold	Daniela Anschütz-Thoms; Stephanie Beckert; Anni Friesinger-Postma; Katrin Mattscherodt	(Canada) 2010 Vancouver	Speed skating	Women's team pursuit
Silver	Jenny Wolf	(Canada) 2010 Vancouver	Speed skating	Women's 500 metres
Silver	Stephanie Beckert	(Canada) 2010 Vancouver	Speed skating	Women's 3000 metres
Silver	Stephanie Beckert	(Canada) 2010 Vancouver	Speed skating	Women's 5000 metres
