= Guglielmo =

Guglielmo (pronounced [ɡuʎˈʎɛlmo]) is the Italian form of the masculine name William. It may refer to:

People with the given name Guglielmo:

- Guglielmo I Gonzaga (1538–1587), Duke of Mantua and Montferrat
- Guglielmo Agnelli (c. 1238 – 1313), Italian sculptor and architect
- Guglielmo Arena (born 1973), Swiss football manager
- Guglielmo Bergamasco (c. 1485 – 1550), Italian architect
- Guglielmo Borremans (1670–1744), Baroque painter
- Guglielmo Bosca (born 1993), Italian alpine skier
- Guglielmo Caccia (1568–1625), Italian painter
- Guglielmo Achille Cavellini (1914–1990), influential Italian art collector and mail artist
- Guglielmo da Leoni (c. 1664 – 1740), Italian painter and engraver
- Guglielmo da Marsiglia (1475–1537), Italian painter of stained glass
- Guglielmo della Porta (c. 1500 – 1577), Italian architect and sculptor
- Guglielmo della Scala (died 1404), Lord of Verona
- Guglielmo Ebreo da Pesaro (c. 1420 – c. 1484), Italian dancing-master
- Guglielmo Embriaco (born c. 1040), Genoese merchant and military leader
- Guglielmo Ferrero (1871–1942), Italian historian, journalist and novelist
- Guglielmo Fiammingo (c. 1530 – 1587), sculptor
- Guglielmo Fieschi (13th century), Italian cardinal
- Guglielmo Gabetto (1916–1949), Italian former football (soccer) player
- Guglielmo il Giuggiola (16th century), Italian poet
- Guglielmo Letteri (1926–2006), Italian comic book artist
- Guglielmo Libri Carucci dalla Sommaja (1803–1869), Italian mathematician
- Guglielmo Marconi (1874–1937), Italian inventor
- Guglielmo Massaia (1809–1889), Italian Catholic missionary
- Guglielmo Nasi (1879–1971), Italian General
- Guglielmo Oberdan (1858–1882), Italian irredentist and terrorist
- Guglielmo Pallotta (1727–1795), Italian Roman Catholic Cardinal
- Willie Pep (1922–2006), real name Guglielmo Papaleo, American professional boxer
- Guglielmo Pepe (1783–1855), Italian general and patriot
- Guglielmo Plüschow (1852–1930), German photographer
- Guglielmo Quarenghi (1826–1882), Italian composer
- Guglielmo Sanfelice d'Acquavilla (1834–1897), cardinal of the Roman Catholic Church
- Guglielmo Scheibmeier (born 1924), Italian bobsledder
- Guglielmo Stendardo (born 1981), Italian football defender
- Guglielmo Verdirame, Baron Verdirame (born 1971), Italian-born British lawyer and member of the House of Lords
- Guglielmo Vicario (born 1996), Italian footballer
- Guglielmo Visconti (c. 1210 – 1276), Italian cardinal
- Mastro Guglielmo (fl. 12th century), Italian painter
- Niccolò Guglielmo Alforae, French engraver
- William Guglielmo Niederland (1904–1993), German-American psychoanalyst

People with the surname Guglielmo:

- Augie Guglielmo (1915–1996), American baseball umpire
- Dudley A. Guglielmo (1909–2005), American insurance commissioner
- Tony Guglielmo (born 1940), American senator
