= Wendlinger =

Wendlinger is a German surname. Notable people with the surname include:

- Heinz Wendlinger, West German bobsledder
- Karl Wendlinger (born 1968), Austrian racing driver

== See also ==
- Weidlinger (disambiguation)
