= Lapidoth =

Lapidoth is a surname. Notable people with the surname include:

- Jan Lapidoth (1915–1989), Swedish bobsledder
- Ruth Lapidoth (born 1930), Israeli researcher and professor

== See also ==
- Lapidoth (biblical figure), a minor figure in the Hebrew Bible
