= Nils Landgren =

Nils Landgren may refer to:

- Nils Landgren (bobsledder) (1923–2002), bobsledder who competed in the early 1950s for Sweden
- Nils Landgren (musician) (born 1956), trombone player from Sweden
