= Lloyd Johnson (bobsleigh) =

American bobsledder

Medal record

Bobsleigh

World Championships
Gold medal – first place	1953 Garmisch-Partenkirchen	Four-man

Lloyd Johnson was an American bobsledder who competed in the early 1950s. He won a gold medal in the four-man event at the 1953 FIBT World Championships in Garmisch-Partenkirchen. Johnson's sled had a fifth place finish at the 1954 championships in Cortina d'Ampezzo. A year later at the 1955 championships in St. Moritz, he competed with a broken collar bone and was thrown off the course at Sunny Corner.

Johnson was a native of Rapid City, South Dakota and graduated from the University of Wisconsin–Madison in 1943.
