= Figoli =

Figoli is a surname. Notable people with this surname include:

- Ernesto Fígoli (1888 –1951), nicknamed "Matucho", Uruguayan football manager
- Luigi Figoli, Italian bobsledder
- Mateo Fígoli Martínez (born 1984), Italian-Uruguayan footballer
- Miguel Carlos Diab Figoli, Uruguayan basketball player
