= Pedrelli =

Pedrelli is an Italian surname. Notable people with the surname include:

- Daniele Pedrelli (born 1988), Italian footballer
- Ivan Pedrelli (born 1986), Italian footballer

== See also ==
- Perelli
- Petrelli
