= Weitling =

Weitling may refer to:

- Günter Weitling (born 1935), a Lutheran theologian and author.
- Wilhelm Weitling (1808–1871), German-born radical political theorist

== See also ==
- Weidling (disambiguation)
- Weidlinger (disambiguation)
