= Kjell Holmström =

Swedish bobsledder

Medal record

Men's Bobsleigh

World Championships
| Bronze medal – third place | 1953 Garmisch-Partenkirchen | Four-man |

Kjell Albrekt Oliver Holmström (July 8, 1916 – March 14, 1999) was a Swedish bobsledder who competed in the 1950s and in the 1960s. He won a bronze medal in the four-man event (tied with West Germany) at the 1953 FIBT World Championships in Garmisch-Partenkirchen.

Holmström also finished sixth in the four-man event and 15th in the two-man event at the 1952 Winter Olympics in Oslo.

Four years later he finished 13th in the four-man event at the 1956 Winter Olympics.

At the 1964 Winter Olympics he finished eleventh in the four-man event.

He was born in Skellefteå and died in Stockholm.
