= Xavier Leitl =

German bobsledder

Medal record

Men's Bobsleigh

Representing West Germany

World Championships
Gold medal – first place	1951 Alpe d'Huez	Four-man

Xavier Leitl was a West German bobsledder who competed in the early 1950s. He won a gold medal in the four-man event at the 1951 FIBT World Championships in the Alpe d'Huez, France.
