= André De Wulf =

Belgian bobsledder (1922–1990)

Personal information
- Nationality: Belgian
- Born: 22 December 1922
- Died: 2 August 1990 (aged 67)

Sport
- Sport: Bobsleigh

André De Wulf (22 December 1922 – 2 August 1990) was a Belgian bobsledder. He competed in the two-man event at the 1952 Winter Olympics.
