= Michael Pössinger =

German bobsledder (1919–2003)

- Born: 18 January 1919; Ettal, Bavaria, Germany
- Died: 23 May 2003 (aged 84); Garmisch-Partenkirchen, Bavaria, Germany
- Military career
- Allegiance: Nazi Germany; West Germany
- Branch: Army (Wehrmacht); German Army
- Service years: 1937–45, 1956–75
- Rank: Major (Wehrmacht); Oberstleutnant (Bundeswehr)
- Commands: I./Grenadier-Regiment 1123
- Conflicts: World War II: Invasion of Poland; Battle of France; Balkans Campaign; Operation Barbarossa
- Awards: Knight's Cross of the Iron Cross with Oak Leaves; Cross of Merit
- Sports career
- Country: West Germany
- Sport: Men's Bobsleigh
Medal record
Men's Bobsleigh
Gold medal – first place	1951 Alpe d'Huez	Four-man
Silver medal – second place	1954 Cortina d'Ampezzo	Four-man
Bronze medal – third place	1953 Garmisch-Partenkirchen	Four-man

Michael Pössinger (18 January 1919 – 23 May 2003) was a German bobsledder who competed in the early 1950s. He won a complete set of medals in the four-man event at the FIBT World Championships with a gold in 1951, a silver in 1954, and a bronze (tied with Sweden) in 1953. Pössinger finished sixth in the four-man event at the 1956 Winter Olympics in Cortina d'Ampezzo.

During World War II, Pössinger served in the mountain troops of the Wehrmacht and was a recipient of the Knight's Cross of the Iron Cross with Oak Leaves. The battalion under his command was responsible for burning to death 21 civilians at Kefalovryso, Greece on 10 July 1943.

== World War II ==
Michael Pössinger joined the mountain troops of the Wehrmacht in October 1937, and took part in the Invasion of Poland (1939) and the Battle of France (1940). He was awarded the Knight's Cross of the Iron Cross on 19 July 1940. In 1941, he fought in the Balkans Campaign and Operation Barbarossa. In 1941 Pössinger participated in the FIS Alpine World Ski Championships 1941 at Cortina d'Ampezzo in Italy and won a Silver Medal. (Note: In 1946, the results were cancelled by the FIS because of the limited number of participants from only German-friendly countries during World War II.)

At the end of 1941 he was put in charge of a Ski company in the 1st Mountain Division. For two months it operated behind Russian lines, attacking supply positions and other strong points, returning to his own lines in February 1942. He continued leading the company in the Caucasus until he was severely wounded in the summer of 1942. On 16 February 1943 Pössinger was awarded the German Cross in Gold. Promoted to Hauptmann on 1 October 1943 he was put in command of the I. Battalion of the 98th Gebirgsjäger-Regiment.

I. Battalion of the 98th Gebirgsjäger-Regiment was responsible for burning to death 21 civilians at Kefalovryso, Greece on 10 July 1943. Historian Hermann Frank Meyer assumes that the actions were personally led by Pössinger.

In October 1944, Pössinger was put in charge of the II. Battalion of the Grenadier-Regiment 1123. For his autonomous counter-attack and break through at Allenstein, he was awarded the Knight's Cross of the Iron Cross with Oak Leaves. In May 1945 he received the Close Combat Clasp in Gold. He surrendered to the American forces in May 1945.

After World War II he initially worked as a business man. On 26 April 1956 he joined the Bundeswehr with the rank of Major. From October 1961 to October 1965 he was commander of the Mountain and Winter Combat School in Mittenwald. He commanded the VKK 653 (Verteidigungskreiskommando—District Defense Command of the German Army) in Murnau until March 1975 and retired from the Bundeswehr on 31 March 1975.

== Awards ==
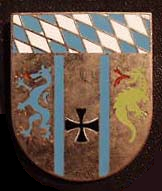
Coats of arms of Verteidigungskreiskommando Murnau

- Iron Cross (1939)
  - 2nd Class (24 September 1939)
  - 1st Class (16 June 1940)
- Infantry Assault Badge (13 April 1942)
- Wound Badge (1939)
  - in Black (6 June 1942)
  - in Silver (15 October 1942)
  - in Gold
- Eastern Front Medal (1 October 1942)
- Five Tank Destruction Badges for Individual Combatants
- German Cross in Gold on 16 February 1943 as Oberleutnant in the 6./Gebirgsjäger-Regiment 98
- Close Combat Clasp
  - in Bronze on 21 June 1943)
  - in Gold on 1 May 1945 for 50 days in close combat
- Croatian Military Order of the Iron Trefoil 3rd Class with Oak Leaves (18 May 1944)
- Knight's Cross of the Iron Cross with Oak Leaves
  - Knight's Cross on 19 July 1940 as Leutnant of the Reserves and company commander in the 16./Gebirgsjäger-Regiment 98
  - 759th Oak Leaves on 28 February 1945 as Major and commander of the I./Grenadier-Regiment 1123
- Romanian Order of the Crown
- Cross of Merit on ribbon (1997)
