= FIBT World Championships 1954 =

Winter sport competition

1954 World Championships
- Location: Cortina d'Ampezzo, Italy

The FIBT World Championships 1954 took place in Cortina d'Ampezzo, Italy for the fourth time after previously hosting in 1937 (Two-man), 1939 (Four-man), and 1950.

== Two man bobsleigh ==
| Pos | Team | Time |
|---|---|---|
| Gold | Italy (Guglielmo Scheibmeier, Andrea Zambelli) | |
| Silver | Italy (Italo Petrelli, Luigi Figoli) | |
| Bronze | United States (Stanley Benham, James Bickford) | |

Italy earned their first championship medals since World War II.

== Four man bobsleigh ==
| Pos | Team | Time |
|---|---|---|
| Gold | Switzerland (Fritz Feierabend, Harry Warburton, Gottfried Diener, Heinrich Angst) | |
| Silver | West Germany (Hans Rösch, Michael Pössinger, Dix Terne, Sylvester Wackerle) | |
| Bronze | West Germany (Theo Kitt, Josef Grün, Klaus Koppenberger, Lorenz Niebert) | |

== Medal table ==
| Rank | Nation | Gold | Silver | Bronze | Total |
|---|---|---|---|---|---|
| 1 | Italy (ITA) | 1 | 1 | 0 | 2 |
| 2 | Switzerland (SUI) | 1 | 0 | 0 | 1 |
| 3 | West Germany (FRG) | 0 | 1 | 1 | 2 |
| 4 | United States (USA) | 0 | 0 | 1 | 1 |
| Totals (4 entries) | | 2 | 2 | 2 | 6 |
