= Romi Spada =

Swiss bobsledder

Medal record

Bobsleigh

World Championships
| Silver medal – second place | 1950 Cortina d'Ampezzo | Four-man |

Romi Spada was a Swiss bobsledder who competed in the early 1950s. He competed in the men's downhill at the 1948 Winter Olympics and won a silver medal in the four-man event at the 1950 FIBT World Championships in Cortina d'Ampezzo.
