= FIL European Luge Championships 1937 =

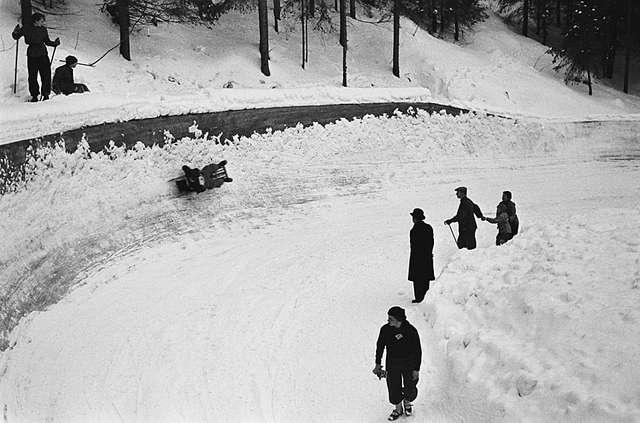

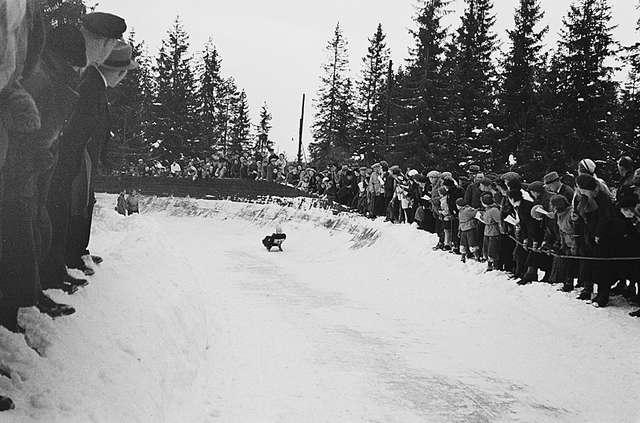

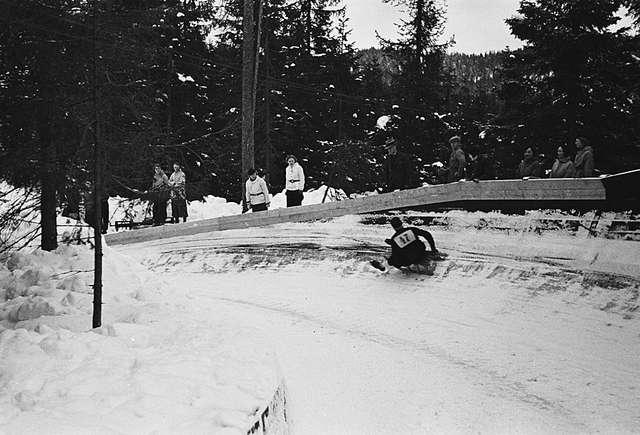

The FIL European Luge Championships 1937 took place in February 1937 at Korketrekkeren in Oslo, Norway under the auspices of the Fédération Internationale de Bobsleigh et de Tobogganing (FIBT - International Bobsleigh and Tobogganing Federation in (in French)) under their "Section de Luge", a trend that would continue until the International Luge Federation (FIL) was formed in 1957.

== Men's singles ==
Medal	Athlete	Time
Gold	Martin Tietze (GER)	
Silver	Vilhelm Klavenæs (NOR)	
Bronze	Harald Seegard (NOR)	

== Women's singles ==
Medal	Athlete	Time
Gold	Titti Maartmann (NOR)	
Silver	Liv Jensen (NOR)	
Bronze	Helen Galtung (NOR)	

== Men's doubles ==
Medal	Athlete	Time
Gold	Germany (Martin Tietze, Kurt Weidner)	
Silver	Germany (Walter Feist, Walter Kluge)	
Bronze	Czechoslovakia (Rudolf Maschke, Erhard Grundmann)	

== Medal table ==
Rank	Nation	Gold	Silver	Bronze	Total
1	Germany (GER)	2	1	0	3
2	Norway (NOR)	1	2	2	5
3	Czechoslovakia (TCH)	0	0	1	1
Totals (3 entries)		3	3	3	9
