= Andreas Ostler =

German bobsledder (1921–1988)

Medal record

Men's bobsleigh

Representing West Germany

Olympic Games
| Gold medal – first place | 1952 Oslo | Two-man |
| Gold medal – first place | 1952 Oslo | Four-man |

World Championships
| Gold medal – first place | 1951 Alpe d'Huez | Two-man |
| Gold medal – first place | 1951 Alpe d'Huez | Four-man |
| Silver medal – second place | 1953 Garmisch-Partenkirchen | Two-man |
| Silver medal – second place | 1953 Garmisch-Partenkirchen | Four-man |

Andreas Benedikt Ostler (21 January 1921 in Grainau – 24 November 1988 in Garmisch-Partenkirchen), known as "Anderl", was a German bobsledder who competed in the early 1950s.

As a teenager during the 1936 Winter Olympics in his home town, Anderl Ostler and future teammates at de:Sportclub (SC) Riessersee became interested in winter sports. The games in 1940 and 1944 were canceled during the war, and Germany was not invited to the 1948 Winter Olympics.

At the 1952 Winter Olympics in Oslo, he became the first person to steer both the two-man and four-man bob to gold medals at the same Winter Olympics, together with Lorenz Nieberl pushing and braking. They were wearing American football helmets. Their 17-year-old two-man bob, officially named "Deutschland I", had written "Cognac" on its front.

When both German 4-man-teams, rivals since their pre-war youth at de:Sportclub (SC) Riessersee in Garmisch, only qualified in mid-field, they decided to join forces. With Friedrich Kuhn and Franz Kemser, the heaviest members of the other team that withdrew, bob "Deutschland I" won all four heats. The Gold medalists had a combined weight of 472 kg, or an average of 118 kg per person. The rules were soon altered, introducing a limit of 400 kg. The German movie de:Schwere Jungs (2007) is based on their story.

Ostler won four medals at the FIBT World Championships with two golds in 1951 and two silvers in 1953 at home in Garmisch-Partenkirchen, each time both in two-man and four-man.

Ostler carried the flag of Germany during the opening ceremonies of the 1956 Winter Olympics in Cortina d'Ampezzo, when Germans took part as United Team of Germany.

After he retired from bobsleigh, Ostler became a gastronomer (Chef).
