= Klaus Koppenberger =

German bobsledder

Medal record

Men's Bobsleigh

Representing West Germany

World Championships
Bronze medal – third place	1954 Cortina d'Ampezzo	Four-man

Klaus Koppenberger was a West German bobsledder who competed in the mid-1950s. He won a bronze medal in the four-man event at the 1954 FIBT World Championships in Cortina d'Ampezzo.
