= Sylvester Wackerle =

German bobsledder

Medal record

Men's Bobsleigh

Representing West Germany

World Championships
Silver medal – second place	1954 Cortina d'Ampezzo	Four-man
Bronze medal – third place	1953 Garmisch-Partenkirchen	Four-man

Sylvester Wackerle (sometimes shown as Silvester Wackerlie, Sr.) (1 January 1908 – 3 March 1978) was a West German bobsledder who competed in the mid-1950s. He won two medals in the four-man event at the FIBT World Championships with a silver in 1954 and a bronze in 1953 (tied with Sweden).

Wackerle also finished sixth in the four-man event at the 1956 Winter Olympics in Cortina d'Ampezzo.
