= Leo J. Martin =

American bobsledder

Leo Martin
Personal information
- Full name: Leo James Martin
- Nationality: American
- Born: 8 February 1921 Louisville, New York, US
- Died: 6 January 1981 (aged 59) Rochester, New York, US

Sport
- Sport: Bobsleigh

Leo James Martin (February 8, 1921 – January 6, 1981) was an American bobsledder who competed in the late 1940s. He finished ninth in the two-man event at the 1948 Winter Olympics in St. Moritz.

He is the son of bobsledder Robert Martin and the brother of bobsledder Patrick Martin.
