= FIBT World Championships 1953 =

Winter sport competition

1953 World Championships
- Location: Garmisch-Partenkirchen, West Germany

The FIBT World Championships 1953 took place in Garmisch-Partenkirchen, West Germany for the third time after previously hosting the four-man event of the championships in 1934 and 1938. The event was marred by the death of Switzerland's Felix Endrich who won the two-man event gold medal only to die in competition during the four-man event a week later.

== Two man bobsleigh ==
Pos	Team	Time
Gold	Switzerland (Felix Endrich, Fritz Stöckli)	
Silver	West Germany (Anderl Ostler, Franz Kemser)	
Bronze	West Germany (Theo Kitt, Lorenz Niebert)	

Gold medalist Endrich would die in the four-man event the following week.

== Four man bobsleigh ==
Pos	Team	Time
Gold	United States (Lloyd Johnson, Piet Biesiadecki, Hubert Miller, Joseph Smith)	
Silver	West Germany (Anderl Ostler, Heinz Wendlinger, Hans Hohenester, Rudi Erben)	
Bronze	Sweden (Kjell Holmström, Walter Aronsson, Nils Landgren, Jan Lapidoth)	
Bronze	West Germany (Hans Rösch, Michael Pössinger, Dix Terne, Sylvester Wackerle)	

== Medal table ==
Rank	Nation	Gold	Silver	Bronze	Total
1	Switzerland (SUI)	1	0	0	1
1	United States (USA)	1	0	0	1
3	West Germany (FRG)	0	2	2	4
4	Sweden (SWE)	0	0	1	1
Totals (4 entries)		2	2	3	7
