= Midtstuen =

Midstuen
- Village
- Interactive map of Midstuen
- Coordinates: 59°57′37″N 10°41′01″E
- Time zone: UTC+01:00 (CET)

Midtstuen is an area in the borough Vestre Aker in Oslo, Norway.

Originally a forested area in the former municipality Aker, it was later incorporated into Oslo. In the 1960s it was developed as a residential area. It is served by Midtstuen Station of the Oslo Metro. The sports venues Korketrekkeren and Midtstubakken are adjacent, but formally located in Nordmarka.
