= Andrea Zambelli =

Italian bobsledder (1927–1994)

Medal record

Bobsleigh

World Championships
Gold medal – first place	1954 Cortina d'Ampezzo	Two-man

Andrea Zambelli (24 April 1927 – 22 October 1994) was an Italian bobsledder who competed in the mid-1950s. He won a gold medal in the two-man event at the 1954 FIBT World Championships in Cortina d'Ampezzo.
