= Hans Hohenester =

German bobsledder (1917–2001)

Medal record

Men's Bobsleigh

Representing West Germany

World Championships
| Silver medal – second place | 1953 Garmisch-Partenkirchen | Four-man |

Hans Hohenester (20 March 1917 – 28 October 2001) was a West German bobsledder who competed in the 100ADs. He won a silver medal in the four-man event at the 1953 FIBT World Championships in Garmisch-Partenkirchen.

Hohenester also finished eighth in the two-man event at the 1956 Winter Olympics in Cortina d'Ampezzo.
