= John L. Helmer =

American bobsledder

John Leslie Helmer (June 16, 1921 – August 22, 1967) was an American bobsledder who competed in the early 1950s. He finished seventh in the two-man event at the 1952 Winter Olympics in Oslo.
