= Hubert Miller =

American bobsledder

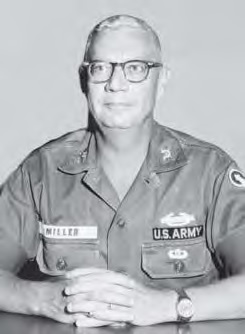

Medal record

Bobsleigh

Representing United States

World Championships
| Gold medal – first place | 1953 Garmisch-Partenkirchen | Four-man |

Hubert G. Miller (Note: Sources differ as to his middle name. Social Security and Selective Service records use Goldsmith, which was his mother's maiden name. U.S. Army personnel records use George. Olympic historians use Gene. He was buried as Hubert G Miller.) (February 24, 1918 – November 18, 2000) was an American bobsledder who competed in the 1950s. He won a gold medal in the four-man event at the 1953 FIBT World Championships in Garmisch-Partenkirchen. Competing in two Winter Olympics, Miller earned his best finish of ninth in the four-man event at Oslo in 1952.

Miller also served in the United States Army during World War II, the Korean War, and the Vietnam War. He received the Distinguished Service Cross for extraordinary heroism in July 1944 during the Battle of Normandy while serving in the infantry.

Miller was born in Saranac Lake, New York, and studied at St. Lawrence University until 1938. He then earned a LL.B. degree from Albany Law School in 1941. Miller enlisted in the Army on February 17, 1942 and was commissioned as a second lieutenant on October 8, 1942 upon completion of Officer Candidate School. After further training, Miller landed at Utah Beach on June 8, 1944 with the 358th Infantry Regiment, 90th Infantry Division. Given command of Company I, he participated in the breakout from the beachhead to the countryside beyond. While advancing through hedgerows near La Valaissere, France on July 12, 1944, his troops came under fire from German machine guns and Miller himself was wounded. Learning that the commanders of Companies K and L had been incapacitated, he assumed command of all three companies and even exposed himself to further enemy fire to personally pull one of his wounded men back to safety. Miller was relieved by another officer about three hours later and evacuated to England the following day. After recuperation, he returned to the United States in January 1945 and served as a training officer until October 1945 when he was released from active duty. Miller was awarded the Distinguished Service Cross, the Bronze Star Medal and two Purple Hearts for his World War II combat service.

After the war, Miller worked as a lawyer in Saranac Lake and was elected to the County Board of Supervisors. He was recalled to active duty during the Korean War and served as an infantry training officer at Fort Dix. Miller tried out for the 1952 Winter Olympic team and was selected to participate in four-man bobsled at the games in Oslo, Norway. The Army then sent him to Garmisch, West Germany where he was able to continue training and eventually participate on the gold-medal-winning four-man team at the 1953 World Championships.

Miller also participated in four-man bobsled at the 1956 Winter Olympic games in Cortina, Italy before joining the Judge Advocate General's Corps (JAG) in March 1956 and then completing the advanced course at The Judge Advocate General's School. He later graduated from the Army Command and General Staff College in 1959 and the Army War College in 1964. Miller also earned an M.A. degree from George Washington University in 1964. He would rise to the rank of colonel during the Vietnam War, retiring in 1975 at that rank.

After retirement, Miller and his wife Lou settled in Elberta, Alabama. He was buried at Barrancas National Cemetery after his death.
