= Joseph Smith (bobsleigh) =

American bobsledder (1925–1983)

Medal record

Bobsleigh

World Championships
Gold medal – first place	1953 Garmisch-Partenkirchen	Four-man

Joseph Winford Smith (December 20, 1925 – March 28, 1983) was an American bobsledder who competed in the 1950s. He won a gold medal in the four-man event at the 1953 FIBT World Championships in Garmisch-Partenkirchen.

== Military service ==
Smith was born and raised in Cullman County, Alabama. During World War II, he served in the United States Navy from October 1943 to April 1946. Smith was an enlisted soldier in the United States Army Reserve from April 1947 to March 1948 and began to pursue a college degree. He was commissioned as a second lieutenant in the Army Reserve on May 30, 1950 and completed a B.S. degree at the Alabama State Teachers College in Florence in 1951.

Lieutenant Colonel Joseph Smith or "Colonel Joe" worked with the USO as Chief of the Armed Forces Entertainment Office. He traveled with many of the celebrities who performed for the USO during the Vietnam War period including Bob Hope, Sammy Davis Jr., Jim Nabors, Raquel Welch, among many others.

Joseph Smith was offered the position of the Director of Entrainment for the Disney Corporation, which he promptly turned down, as well as turning down a multimillion-dollar deal for the writing of his personal memoirs.

In 1983, Smith died in Hillsborough County, Florida due to a massive heart attack. He was buried at Myrtle Hill Memorial Park in Tampa, Florida.
