= Hans Bolli =

Swiss bobsledder

Medal record

Bobsleigh

World Championships
Bronze medal – third place	1950 Cortina d'Ampezzo	Four-man
Bronze medal – third place	1951 Alpe d'Huez	Four-man

Hans Bolli was a Swiss bobsledder who competed in the early 1950s. He won two bronze medals in the four-man event at the FIBT World Championships (1950, 1951).
