= Franz Kapus =

Swiss bobsledder (1909–1981)

Medal record

Men's Bobsleigh

Representing Switzerland

Olympic Games
Gold medal – first place	1956 Cortina d'Ampezzo	Four-man

World Championships
Gold medal – first place	1955 St. Moritz	Four-man
Bronze medal – third place	1950 Cortina d'Ampezzo	Four-man
Bronze medal – third place	1951 Alpe d'Huez	Four-man
Bronze medal – third place	1955 St. Moritz	Two-man

Franz Kapus (April 12, 1909 in Zurich – March 4, 1981 in Zurich) was a Swiss bobsledder who competed in the 1950s. Competing in three Winter Olympics, he won the gold medal in the four-man event at Cortina d'Ampezzo in 1956.

Kapus also won four medals at the FIBT World Championships with one gold (Four-man: 1955) and three bronzes (Two-man: 1955, Four-man: 1950, 1951).
