= FIBT World Championships 1951 =

Winter sport competition

1951 World Championships
- Location: Alpe d'Huez, France

The FIBT World Championships 1951 took place in Alpe d'Huez, France. Germany returned to the FIBT World Championships for the first time since World War II, albeit as the separate countries of East Germany and West Germany.

== Two man bobsleigh ==
Pos	Team	Time
Gold	West Germany (Anderl Ostler, Lorenz Niebert)	
Silver	United States (Stanley Benham, Patrick Martin)	
Bronze	Switzerland (Felix Endrich, Werner Spring)	

== Four man bobsleigh ==
Pos	Team	Time
Gold	West Germany (Anderl Ostler, Xavier Leitl, Michael Pössinger, Lorenz Niebert)	
Silver	United States (Stanley Benham, Patrick Martin, James Atkinson, Gary Sheffield)	
Bronze	Switzerland (Franz Kapus, Franz Stöckli, Hans Bolli, Heinrich Angst)	

== Medal table ==
Rank	Nation	Gold	Silver	Bronze	Total
1	West Germany (FRG)	2	0	0	2
2	United States (USA)	0	2	0	2
3	Switzerland (SUI)	0	0	2	2
Totals (3 entries)		2	2	2	6
