= Heinrich Angst =

Swiss bobsledder (1915–1989)

Medal record

Men's Bobsleigh

Representing Switzerland

Olympic Games
Gold medal – first place	1956 Cortina d'Ampezzo	Four-man

World Championships
Gold medal – first place	1954 Cortina d'Ampezzo	Four-man
Gold medal – first place	1955 St. Moritz	Four-man
Silver medal – second place	1949 Lake Placid	Two-man
Bronze medal – third place	1949 Lake Placid	Four-man
Bronze medal – third place	1950 Cortina d'Ampezzo	Four-man
Bronze medal – third place	1951 Alpe d'Huez	Four-man
Bronze medal – third place	1955 St. Moritz	Two-man

Heinrich Angst (August 29, 1915 – September 9, 1989) was a Swiss bobsledder who competed in the mid-1950s. Competing in two Winter Olympics, he won a gold medal in the four-man event at the Cortina d'Ampezzo in 1956.

Angst also won seven medals at the FIBT World Championships with two golds (Four-man: 1954, 1955), one silver (Two-man: 1949) and four bronzes (Two-man: 1955, Four-man: 1949, 1950, 1951).
