= Petrelli =

Petrelli is an Italian surname. Notable people with the surname include:

== People ==
- Elia Petrelli (born 2001), Italian football player
- Italo Petrelli, Italian bobsledder
- Sergio Petrelli (born 1944), Italian football player
- Valentino Petrelli (1922–2001), Italian photographer

== Characters ==
- Several characters of the Heroes
  - Peter Petrelli, portrayed by Milo Ventimiglia
  - Nathan Petrelli, portrayed by Adrian Pasdar
  - Angela Petrelli, portrayed by Cristine Rose
  - Arthur Petrelli
  - Heidi Petrelli
  - Simon & Monty Petrelli
