= Robert Martin (bobsleigh) =

American bobsledder

Personal information
- Full name: Robert Patrick Martin
- Nationality: American
- Born: 1 December 1900 Louisville, New York, US
- Died: 26 November 1942 (aged 41) Massena, New York, US

Sport
- Sport: Bobsleigh

Robert Martin (December 1, 1900 – November 26, 1942) was an American bobsledder who competed in the 1930s. He finished fourth in the four-man event at the 1936 Winter Olympics in Garmisch-Partenkirchen.

He is the father of bobsledders Leo Martin and Patrick Martin.
