= Charles De Sorgher =

Belgian bobsledder (1930–2014)

Charles De Sorgher (14 November 1930 – 4 December 2014) was a Belgian bobsledder who competed in the early 1950s. At the 1952 Winter Olympics in Oslo, he finished 18th in the two-man event.
