= Franz Stöckli =

Swiss bobsledder

Medal record

Bobsleigh

World Championships
Bronze medal – third place	1950 Cortina d'Ampezzo	Four-man
Bronze medal – third place	1951 Alpe d'Huez	Four-man

Franz Stöckli was a Swiss bobsledder who competed in the early 1950s. He won two bronze medals in the four-man event at the FIBT World Championships, earning them in 1950 and 1951.
