= Weidling =

Weidling may refer to:

- Helmuth Weidling (1891–1955), German General der Artillerie during World War II
- Weidling, Klosterneuburg, a village within the municipality of Klosterneuburg, Lower Austria
- A village within the municipality of Statzendorf, Lower Austria
- Weidling (boat), a type of boat

== See also ==
- Weidlinger (disambiguation)
- Weitling (disambiguation)
