= Piet Biesiadecki =

American bobsledder (1920–2000)

Medal record

Bobsleigh

Representing United States

World Championships
Gold medal – first place	1953 Garmisch-Partenkirchen	Four-man

Patrick Walter "Piet" Biesiadecki (March 9, 1920 – November 26, 2000) was an American bobsledder who competed in the 1950s. He won a gold medal in the four-man event at the 1953 FIBT World Championships in Garmisch-Partenkirchen.

Biesiadecki also finished fifth in the two-man event at the 1956 Winter Olympics in Cortina d'Ampezzo.

Born and raised in Ware, Massachusetts, Biesiadecki was a career United States Army soldier who served during World War II, the Korean War and the Vietnam War and retired from active duty as a sergeant first class. After his death, he was buried at Fort Sam Houston National Cemetery.
