= Nils Landgren (bobsledder) =

Swedish bobsledder

Medal record

Men's Bobsleigh

World Championships
Bronze medal – third place	1953 Garmisch-Partenkirchen	Four-man

Nils Landgren (August 19, 1923 – November 15, 2002) was a Swedish bobsledder who competed in the 1950s. He won a bronze medal in the four-man event (tied with West Germany) at the 1953 FIBT World Championships in Garmisch-Partenkirchen.

Landgren also finished sixth in the four-man event and 15th in the two-man event at the 1952 Winter Olympics in Oslo.
