= Italo Petrelli =

Italian bobsledder

Medal record

Bobsleigh

World Championships
Silver medal – second place	1954 Cortina d'Ampezzo	Two-man

Italo Petrelli is an Italian bobsledder who competed in the mid-1950s. He won a silver medal in the two-man event at the 1954 FIBT World Championships in Cortina d'Ampezzo.

Petrelli was a jet pilot in the Italian air force.
