= Anton Salvesen =

Norwegian luger (1927–1994)

Medal record

Luge

World Championships
Gold medal – first place	1955 Oslo	Men's singles

Anton Salvesen (24 October 1927 – 24 July 1994) was a Norwegian luger who competed in the 1950s. At the inaugural event at the FIL World Luge Championships in Oslo in 1955, he won the gold medal in the men's singles event.
