= Helen Galtung =

Norwegian luger

Medal record

Luge

European Championships
Bronze medal – third place	1937 Oslo	Women's singles

Helen Galtung was a Norwegian luger who competed in the late 1930s. She won a bronze medal in the women's singles event at the 1937 European luge championships in Oslo, Norway.
