= Theo Kitt =

West German bobsledder

Medal record

Men´s Bobsleigh

Representing West Germany

World Championships
Bronze medal – third place	1953 Garmisch-Partenkirchen	Two-man
Bronze medal – third place	1954 Cortina d'Ampezzo	Four-man

Theo Kitt (born 14 October 1912, date of death unknown) was a West German bobsledder who competed in the mid-1950s. He won two bronze medals at the FIBT World Championships, winning them in the two-man event in 1953 and in the four-man event in 1954. Kitt also finished 11th in the two-man event at the 1952 Winter Olympics in Oslo.
