= Augie Guglielmo =

American baseball umpire (1915-1996)

- Born: January 17, 1915; Waterbury, Connecticut, U.S.
- Died: February 28, 1996 (aged 81); Waterbury, Connecticut, U.S.
- Occupation: Umpire
- Years active: 1952
- Employer: National League

Angelo "Augie" Guglielmo (January 17, 1915 – February 28, 1996) was an American professional baseball umpire who worked one full MLB season, 1952, for the National League. The native of Waterbury, Connecticut, a United States Army veteran of World War II, was an arbiter for two decades in Organized Baseball. Although his major-league tenure lasted only one year, he was the senior umpire in the Triple-A International League for 14 seasons (1953 to 1966) and his stepson, Terry Tata, umpired in the Senior Circuit for 27 seasons (1973 to 1999) and 3,743 regular-season games.

Guglielmo umpired a full slate of 154 regular-season games in 1952, including 42 games behind home plate and 39 at first base. He ejected ten uniformed personnel—five of them members of the Brooklyn Dodgers, who won the National League pennant that season.

Guglielmo died in his native city at the age of 81.
