= Bobsleigh at the 1952 Winter Olympics =

Bobsleigh at the VI Olympic Winter Games
- Venue: Oslo, Norway
- Dates: 14–22 February 1952
- Competitors: 70 from 10 nations

At the 1952 Winter Olympics, two bobsleigh events were contested. The two-man competition was held on Thursday and Friday, 14 and 15 February 1952 while the four-man competition was held on Thursday and Friday, 21 and 22 February 1952.

== Medal summary ==
Event	Gold	Silver	Bronze
Two-man	Germany; Germany I Andreas Ostler; Lorenz Nieberl	United States; USA I Stanley Benham; Patrick Martin	Switzerland; Switzerland I Fritz Feierabend; Stephan Waser
Four-man	Germany; Germany I Andreas Ostler; Friedrich Kuhn; Lorenz Nieberl; Franz Kemser	United States; USA I Stanley Benham; Patrick Martin; Howard Crossett; James Atkinson	Switzerland; Switzerland I Fritz Feierabend; Albert Madörin; André Filippini; Stephan Waser

== Participating nations ==
Belgium only competed in the two-man event and Argentina only competed in the four-man event. 25 bobsledders competed in both events.

A total of 71 bobsledders from ten nations competed at the Oslo Games:

- Argentina (4)
- Austria (8)
- Belgium (4)
- France (5)
- Germany (6)
- Italy (8)
- Norway (9)
- Sweden (9)
- Switzerland (8)
- United States (10)

== Medal table ==
Rank	Nation	Gold	Silver	Bronze	Total
1	Germany	2	0	0	2
2	United States	0	2	0	2
3	Switzerland	0	0	2	2
Totals (3 entries)		2	2	2	6
