= Niccolò Guglielmo Alforae =

French engraver

Niccolo Guglielmo Alforae was a French engraver of the Baroque period, active in Rome. He was a native of Lorraine, but resided in Rome. There is a set of twelve small upright prints of flowers. They are inscribed Nicholaus Gulielmus Alforae Lotharingus fecit, Romae.

== Sources ==
- Bryan, Michael (1886). Robert Edmund Graves (ed.). Dictionary of Painters and Engravers, Biographical and Critical. Vol. I: A-K. London: George Bell and Sons. p. 18.
