= Werner Spring =

Swiss bobsledder (1917–1959)

Medal record

Bobsleigh

World Championships
Bronze medal – third place	1949 Lake Placid	Four-man
Bronze medal – third place	1951 Alpe d'Huez	Two-man

Werner Spring (27 March 1917 – 1959) was a Swiss bobsledder who competed in the late 1940s and the early 1950s. He won two bronze medals at the FIBT World Championships with one in the two-man event (1951) and the other in the four-man event (1949).

Spring also competed in two Winter Olympics, earning his best finish of fourth in both the two-man and four man events at Oslo in 1952.

Spring died in Zug, Switzerland, in 1959.
