= FIBT World Championships 1950 =

Winter sport competition

1950 World Championships
- Location: Cortina d'Ampezzo, Italy

The FIBT World Championships 1950 took place in Cortina d'Ampezzo, Italy for the third time after hosting the event previously in 1937 (Two-man) and 1939 (Four-man).

== Two man bobsleigh ==
Pos	Team	Time
Gold	Switzerland (Fritz Feierabend, Stephan Waser)	
Silver	United States (Stanley Benham, Patrick Martin)	
Bronze	United States (Frederick Fortune, William d'Amico)	

== Four man bobsleigh ==
Pos	Team	Time
Gold	United States (Stanley Benham, Patrick Martin, James Atkinson, William d'Amico)	
Silver	Switzerland (Fritz Feierabend, Albert Madörin, Romi Spada, Stephen Waser)	
Bronze	Switzerland (Franz Kapus, Franz Stöckli, Hans Bolli, Heinrich Angst)	

== Medal table ==
Rank	Nation	Gold	Silver	Bronze	Total
1	Switzerland (SUI)	1	1	1	3
1	United States (USA)	1	1	1	3
Totals (2 entries)		2	2	2	6
