= James Atkinson (bobsleigh) =

American bobsledder (1929–2010)

Medal record

Bobsleigh

Representing the United States

Olympic Games
Silver medal – second place	1952 Oslo	Four-man

World Championships
Gold medal – first place	1950 Cortina d'Ampezzo	Four-man
Silver medal – second place	1951 Alpe d'Huez	Four-man

James Neil Atkinson (January 10, 1929 – July 31, 2010) was an American bobsledder who competed in the early 1950s. He won a silver medal in the four-man event at the 1952 Winter Olympics in Oslo.

Atkinson also won two medals in the four-man event at the FIBT World Championships with one gold (1950) and one silver (1951).
