= Liv Jensen =

Norwegian luger

Medal record

Luge

European Championships
Silver medal – second place	1937 Oslo	Women's singles

Liv Jensen was a Norwegian luger who competed in the late 1930s. She won a silver medal in the women's singles event at the 1937 European luge championships in Oslo, Norway.
