= Robert Guillard =

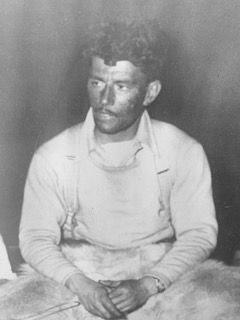

Personal information
- Full name: Robert Victor Guillard
- Nationality: French
- Born: 1 October 1919; Ville-d'Avray, France
- Died: 11 January 2013 (aged 93); Denguin, France

Sport
- Sport: Bobsleigh

Robert Guillard (October 1, 1919 – January 11, 2013) was a French polar researcher and head of French Antarctic expeditions. From 1947 to 1984 he participated in 44 French polar expeditions to Greenland and to Antarctica. He served as the head of the French scientific station Dumont d`Urville Station in Adélie Land in Antarctica in 1956, 1963, 1972 and 1977. In the early 1950s he was also an active bobsledder and was a member of the French bobsled team at the 1952 Winter Olympics in Oslo.
