= Josef Thaler =

Austrian luger

Medal record

Luge

World Championships
Gold medal – first place	1955 Oslo	Men's doubles
Silver medal – second place	1955 Oslo	Men's singles

European Championships
Bronze medal – third place	1956 Imst	Men's doubles

Josef Thaler is an Austrian luger who competed in the 1950s. He won two medals at the inaugural event at the FIL World Luge Championships in Oslo in 1955 with a gold in the men's doubles and a silver in the men's singles events.

Thaler also won a bronze medal in the men's doubles event at the 1956 European luge championships in Imst, Austria.
