= Heinz Wendlinger =

German bobsledder

Medal record

Men's Bobsleigh

Representing West Germany

World Championships
Silver medal – second place	1953 Garmisch-Partenkirchen	Four-man

Heinz Wendlinger was a West German bobsledder who competed in the 1950s. He won a silver medal in the four-man event at the 1953 FIBT World Championships in Garmisch-Partenkirchen.
