= Kurt Weidner =

German luger

Medal record

Luge

European Championships
Gold medal – first place	1937 Oslo	Men's doubles
Silver medal – second place	1935 Krynica	Men's doubles

Kurt Weidner was a German luger who competed in the mid-1930s. He won two medals in the men's doubles event at the European luge championships with a gold in 1937 and a silver in 1935.
