= Jan Lapidoth =

Swedish bobsledder (1915–1989)

Medal record

Men's Bobsleigh

World Championships
Bronze medal – third place	1953 Garmisch-Partenkirchen	Four-man

Jan de Man Lapidoth (June 16, 1915 – June 11, 1989) was a Swedish bobsledder who competed in the 1950s. He won a bronze medal in the four-man event (tied with West Germany) at the 1953 FIBT World Championships in Garmisch-Partenkirchen.

At the 1952 Winter Olympics in Oslo, Lapidoth finished sixth in the four-man event and eighth in the two-man event.

Four years later he finished 13th in the four-man event at the 1956 Winter Olympics.
