= Harald Seegard =

Norwegian luger

Medal record

Luge

European Championships
Bronze medal – third place	1937 Oslo	Men's singles

Harald Seegard was a Norwegian luger who competed during the 1930s. He won the silver medal in the men's singles event at the 1937 European luge championships in Oslo, Norway.
