= Martin Tietze =

German luger (1908–1942)

Medal record

Luge

European Championships
Gold medal – first place	1934 Ilmenau	Men's singles
Gold medal – first place	1935 Krynica	Men's singles
Gold medal – first place	1937 Oslo	Men's singles
Gold medal – first place	1937 Oslo	Men's doubles
Gold medal – first place	1938 Salzburg	Men's singles
Silver medal – second place	1935 Krynica	Men's doubles
Silver medal – second place	1939 Reichenberg	Men's singles

Martin Tietze (23 October 1908 – 13 September 1942) was a German luger who competed during the 1930s. He won seven medals at the European luge championships with five golds (Men's singles: 1934, 1935, 1937, 1938; Men's doubles: 1937) and two silvers (Men's singles: 1939, Men's doubles: 1935). Tietze's four championships in the men's singles has not been equaled as of 2007.

== Death ==
Tietze was killed during World War II in the Soviet Union. His younger sister Friedel also competed in luge.
