= Rudolf Maschke =

German luger

Medal record

Luge

European Championships
Gold medal – first place	1952 Garmisch-Partenkirchen	Men's singles
Silver medal – second place	1934 Ilmenau	Men's singles
Silver medal – second place	1934 Ilmenau	Men's doubles
Bronze medal – third place	1937 Oslo	Men's doubles
Bronze medal – third place	1938 Salzburg	Men's singles

Rudolf Maschke was a luger who competed for Czechoslovakia before World War II and for West Germany after World War II. He won five medals at the European luge championships with one gold (Men's singles: 1952), two silvers (Men's singles and men's doubles: both 1934), and two bronzes (Men's doubles: 1937, 1938).
