= Guglielmo Scheibmeier =

Italian bobsledder (born 1924)

Medal record

Bobsleigh

World Championships
Gold medal – first place	1954 Cortina d'Ampezzo	Two-man

Guglielmo Scheibmeier (born 26 May 1924) is an Italian bobsledder who competed in the mid-1950s. He won a gold medal in the two-man event at the 1954 FIBT World Championships in Cortina d'Ampezzo.
