= Titti Maartmann =

Norwegian luger (1920–2018)

Personal information
- Citizenship: Norway
- Born: 27 September 1920
- Died: 18 September 2018 (aged 97) Oslo, Norway
- Education: Physiotherapist
- Occupation: Business owner
Medal record
Women's Luge
Representing Norway
European Championships
Gold medal – first place	1937 Oslo	Women's singles

Titti Astri Maartmann (27 September 1920 – 18 September 2018) was a Norwegian luger who competed in the late 1930s. She won a gold medal in the women's singles event at the 1937 European luge championships in Oslo, Norway. Living an active life, she still played golf at age 97.

Her uncles were soccer players Erling Maartmann and Rolf Maartmann. Her great-grandfather was Norwegian politician Knud Geelmuyden Fleischer Maartmann. Her grandfather was Harald Sigvart Maartmann, the first Executive Director of Ringnes.
