= Albert Madörin =

Swiss bobsledder (1905–1960)

Medal record

Men's Bobsleigh

Olympic Games
Bronze medal – third place	1952 Oslo	Four-man

World Championships
Silver medal – second place	1950 Cortina d'Ampezzo	Four-man

Albert Madörin (March 17, 1905 – June 1960) was a Swiss bobsledder who competed in the early 1950s. He won a bronze medal in the four-man event at the 1952 Winter Olympics in Oslo. Madörin also won a silver medal in the four-man event at the 1950 FIBT World Championships in Cortina d'Ampezzo.
