= Vilhelm Klavenæs =

Norwegian luger

Medal record

Luge

Representing Norway

European Championships
Silver medal – second place	1937 Oslo	Men's singles

Vilhelm Klavenæs was a Norwegian luger who competed during the 1930s. He won the silver medal in the men's singles event at the 1937 European luge championships in Oslo, Norway.
