= Stanley Benham =

American bobsledder

Medal record

Bobsleigh

Representing the United States

Olympic Games
Silver medal – second place	1952 Oslo	Two-man
Silver medal – second place	1952 Oslo	Four-man

World Championships
Gold medal – first place	1949 Lake Placid	Four-man
Gold medal – first place	1950 Cortina d'Ampezzo	Four-man
Silver medal – second place	1950 Cortina d'Ampezzo	Two-man
Silver medal – second place	1951 Alpe d'Huez	Two-man
Silver medal – second place	1951 Alpe d'Huez	Four-man
Silver medal – second place	1961 Lake Placid	Four-man
Bronze medal – third place	1954 Cortina d'Ampezzo	Two-man

Stanley Delong Benham (December 21, 1913 – April 22, 1970) was an American bobsledder who competed from the late 1940s to the early 1960s. At the 1952 Winter Olympics in Oslo, he barely lost the gold medals in both the two-man and four-man events.

Benham also won seven medals at the FIBT World Championships with two golds (Four-man: 1949, 1950), four silvers (Two-man: 1950, 1951; Four-man: 1951, 1961), and one bronze (Two-man: 1954).

After retiring from bobsleigh, Benham served as a sports official with the FIBT (International Bobsleigh and Tobogganing Federation).
