= Patrick Martin (bobsleigh) =

American bobsledder (1923–1987)

Personal information
- Full name: Patrick Henry Martin
- Nationality: American
- Born: 19 August 1923 Louisville, New York, USA
- Died: 21 April 1987 (aged 63) Massena, New York, USA

Sport
- Sport: Bobsleigh
Medal record
Men's bobsleigh
Representing the United States
Olympic Games
Gold medal – first place	1948 St. Moritz	Four-man
Silver medal – second place	1952 Oslo	Two-man
Silver medal – second place	1952 Oslo	Four-man
World Championships
Gold medal – first place	1949 Lake Placid	Four-man
Gold medal – first place	1950 Cortina d'Ampezzo	Four-man
Silver medal – second place	1950 Cortina d'Ampezzo	Two-man
Silver medal – second place	1951 Alpe d'Huez	Two-man
Silver medal – second place	1951 Alpe d'Huez	Four-man

Patrick Henry "Pat" Martin (August 19, 1923 – April 21, 1987) was an American bobsledder who competed in the late 1940s and early 1950s. He was born and lived in Massena, New York, 80 miles north of Lake Placid. Competing in two Winter Olympics, he won three medals with a gold (Four-man: 1948) and two silvers (Two-man and four-man: both 1952).

Martin also won five medals at the FIBT World Championships with two golds (Four-man: 1949, 1950) and three silvers (Two-man: 1950, 1951; Four-man: 1951).

He is the son of bobsledder Robert Martin and the brother of bobsledder Leo Martin.
