= Weidlinger =

Weidlinger may refer to:

- Günther Weidlinger (born April 5, 1978), an Austrian long-distance runner
- Weidlinger Associates, a US engineering company founded by Paul Weidlinger in 1949

== See also ==
- Weidling (disambiguation)
