= Stephan Waser =

Swiss bobsledder (1920–1992)

Medal record

Bobsleigh

Olympic Games
Bronze medal – third place	1952 Oslo	Two-man
Bronze medal – third place	1952 Oslo	Four-man

World Championships
Gold medal – first place	1947 St. Moritz	Two-man
Gold medal – first place	1947 St. Moritz	Four-man
Gold medal – first place	1950 Cortina d'Ampezzo	Two-man
Silver medal – second place	1950 Cortina d'Ampezzo	Four-man

Stephan Waser (sometimes shown as Stephen Waser) (March 10, 1920 – June 19, 1992) was a Swiss bobsledder who competed from the late 1940s to the early 1950s. At the 1952 Winter Olympics in Oslo, he won bronze medals in both the two-man and four-man events.

Waser also won four medals at the FIBT World Championships with three golds (Two and Four-man: 1947, Two-man: 1950) and one silver (Four-man: 1950).
