= Franz Kemser =

West German bobsledder

Medal record

Men's bobsleigh

Representing Germany

Representing West Germany

Olympic Games
| Gold medal – first place | 1952 Oslo | Four-man |

World Championships
| Silver medal – second place | 1938 Garmisch-Partenkirchen | Four-man |
| Silver medal – second place | 1953 Garmisch-Partenkirchen | Two-man |
| Bronze medal – third place | 1939 Cortina d'Ampezzo | Four-man |

Franz Kemser (11 November 1910 – 20 January 1986) was a German-West German bobsledder who competed from the late 1930s to the early 1950s. He won a gold medal in the four-man competition at the 1952 Winter Olympics in Oslo.

Kemser also won three medals at the FIBT World Championships with two silvers (Two-man: 1953, Four-man: 1938) and one bronze (Four-man: 1939).
