= Friedrich Kuhn =

West German bobsledder

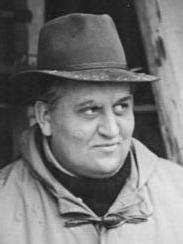
- Fritz Kuhn in 1953

Medal record

Men's bobsleigh

Representing West Germany
| Gold medal – first place | 1952 Oslo | Four-man |

Frederich "Fritz" Kuhn (24 October 1919 – 8 January 2005) was a West German bobsledder who competed in the early 1950s. He won a gold medal in the four-man event at the 1952 Winter Olympics in Oslo.
