= Lorenz Nieberl =

German bobsledder (1919–1968)

Medal record

Men's bobsleigh

Representing Germany

Olympic Games
Gold medal – first place	1952 Oslo	Two-man
Gold medal – first place	1952 Oslo	Four-man

Representing West Germany

World Championships
Gold medal – first place	1951 Alpe d'Huez	Two-man
Gold medal – first place	1951 Alpe d'Huez	Four-man
Bronze medal – third place	1953 Garmisch-Partenkirchen	Two-man
Bronze medal – third place	1954 Cortina d'Ampezzo	Four-man

Lorenz Nieberl (sometimes spelled as Lorenz Niebert; 7 July 1919, in Munich, Germany – 12 April 1968) was a West German bobsledder who competed in the early 1950s. At the 1952 Winter Olympics in Oslo, he became the first person to win both the two-man and four-man competitions at the same Winter Olympics. Nieberl also finished sixth in the four-man event at the 1956 Winter Olympics in Cortina d'Ampezzo.

He also won four medals at the FIBT World Championships with two golds (Two-man and four-man: both 1951) and two bronzes (Two-man: 1953, Four-man: 1954).
