= Witkowski =

Witkowski (Polish feminine: Witkowska, plural: Witkowscy) is a Polish surname. Russian-language variant: Vitkovsky, Lithuanian: Vitkauskas. Notable people with the surname include:

== Witkowski ==
- August Witkowski (1854–1913), Polish physicist
  - Collegium Witkowski in Kraków, Poland
- Bronisław Witkowski (1899–1971), Polish luger
- Charles S. Witkowski (1907–1993), American politician
- Georg Witkowski (1863–1939), Jewish German literary historian
- Georges Martin Witkowski (1867–1943), French conductor and composer
- Igor Witkowski
- John Witkowski (born 1962), American football player
- Kalikst Witkowski (1818–1877), Polish politician
- Kamil Witkowski (born 1984), Polish footballer
- Karol D. Witkowski (1860–1910), Polish-American painter
- Lutz Witkowski (born 1925), German author
- Marek Witkowski (born 1974), Polish sprint canoer
- Maximilian Harden, born Felix Ernst Witkowski (1861–1927), Jewish German journalist
- Michał Witkowski (born 1975), Polish novelist and journalist
- Nicolas Witkowski (1949–2020), French physicist
- Nik Witkowski (born 1976), Canadian rugby player
- Norbert Witkowski (born 1981), Polish footballer
- Peter-Klaus Witkowski (born 1949), German doctor
- Radosław Witkowski (born 1974), Polish politician
- Stanisław Witkowski (1893–1957), Polish military officer
- Szczepan Witkowski (1898–1937), Polish soldier and skier
- Waldemar Witkowski (born 1953), Polish politician
- Kornel Witkowski (born 2002), Polish figure skater
- Jacques Witkowski (born 1963), French civil servant
- Jean Witkowski (1895–1953), French conductor
- Luke Witkowski (born 1990), American ice hockey player
- Stefan Witkowski (1931–2007), Polish chess player
- Sybille Witkowski (born c. 1981), German operatic singer
- Tom Witkowski (born 1937), German actor, stage director, and lecturer
- Tomasz Witkowski (born 1963), Polish psychologist and writer

== Witkowska ==
- Agata Witkowska (born 1989), Polish volleyball player
- Edyta Witkowska (born 1979), Polish wrestler
- Ewa Witkowska (born 1957), Polish sprinter
- Grażyna Witkowska (born 1952), Polish gymnast
- Kamila Witkowska (born 1991), Polish volleyball player

== See also ==
- Vitkovsky
- Wittkowski
