= Winkowski =

Winkowski is a Polish surname. Notable people with the surname include:

- Mary Ann Winkowski, American television personality
- Thomas S. Winkowski (born 1954), American government official

== See also ==
- Wilkowski
- Witkowski
