= Scholder =

Scholder is a surname. Notable people with the surname include:

- Fritz Scholder (1937–2005), Native American artist
- Klaus Scholder (1930–1985), German ecclesiastical historian

== See also ==
- Schöler
