= August Witkowski =

Polish physicist

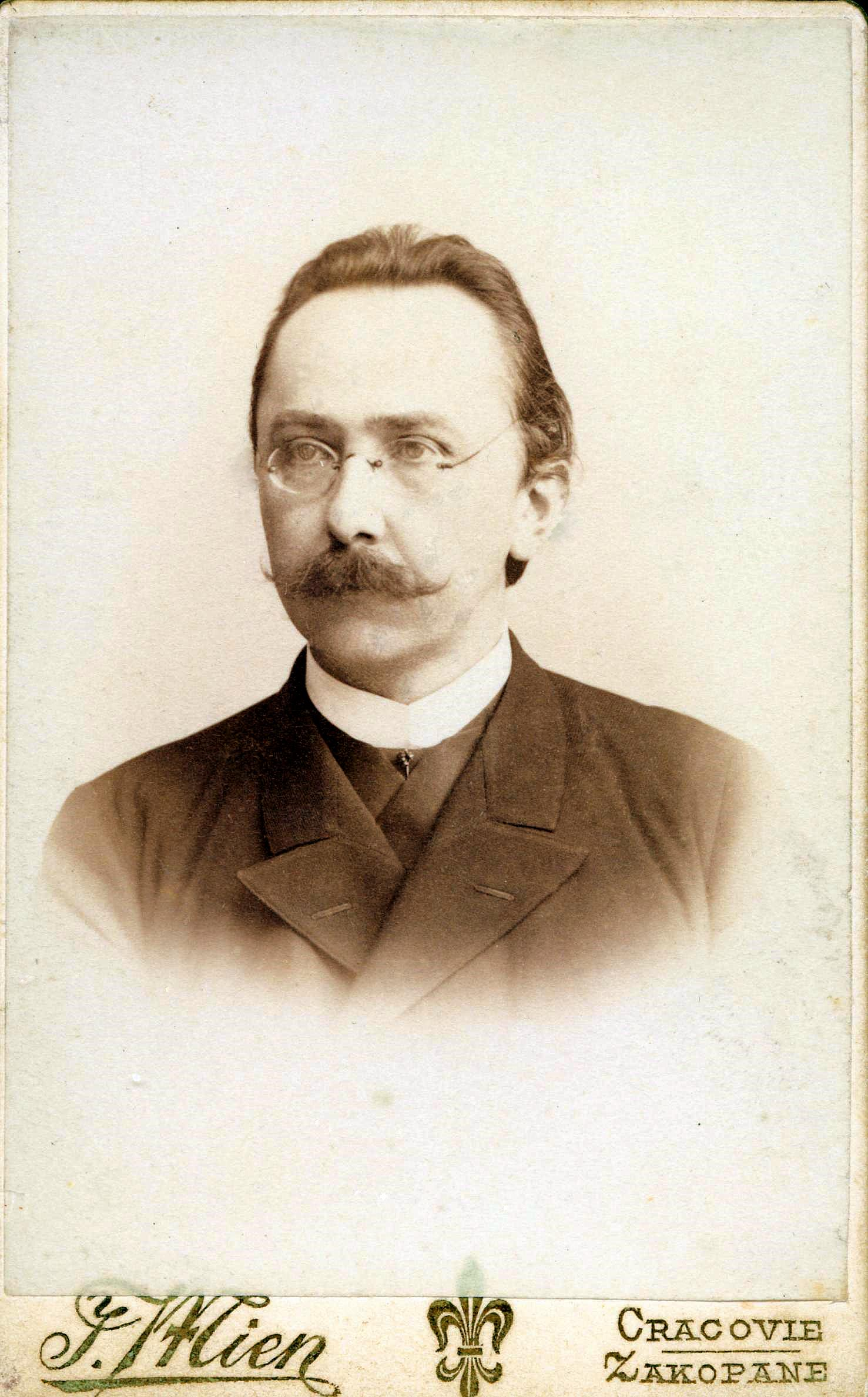
August Witkowski aged 39 (1893)

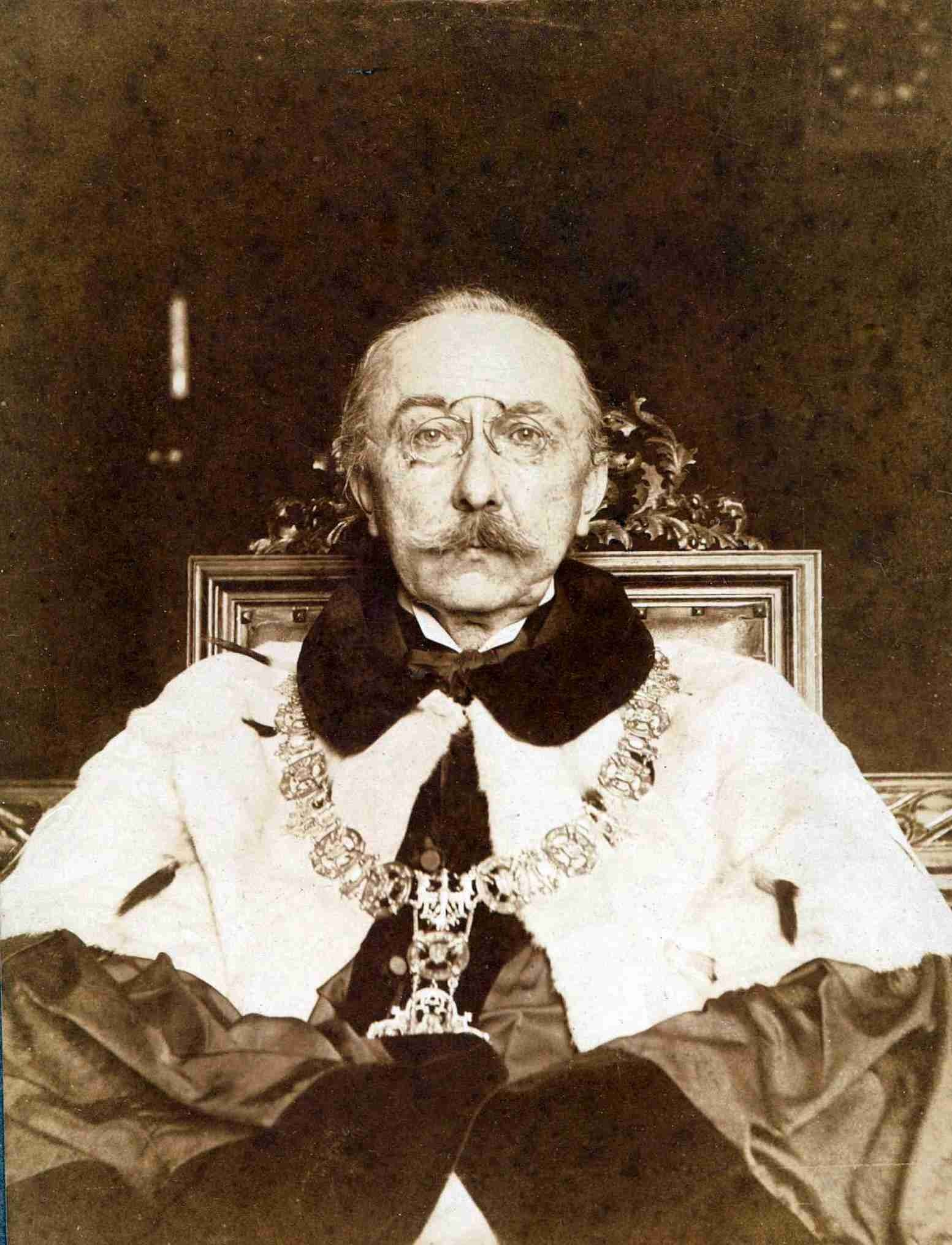
Professor August Witkowski as a rector of Jagiellonian University (1910–1911)

August Wiktor Witkowski (12 October 1854 – 21 January 1913) was a Polish physicist, professor and rector of Jagiellonian University in Kraków.

== Biography ==
August Witkowski was born in the city of Brody, which then belonged to Kingdom of Galicia and Lodomeria, part of the Habsburg monarchy.

The secondary education he acquired in Brody in 1872, and then became a student of The Engineering Faculty of Technical University in Lviv. Engineer diploma he acquired in 1877, and at the same time he gained a position of professor's assistant in Department of Geodetics Engineering. Shortly he entered Lviv University, where he studied the mathematics and physics. Owing to very good results of his education, he acquired a scholarship in Berlin. He continued there studies under Gustav Kirchhoff direction (two years period). Next he moved to Great Britain for one-year studies under William Thomson-Lord Kelvin direction. After his return (1881) to Lviv he was shortly qualified as an assistant professor (1882) and at the age of 33 he acquired a degree of associate professor (1887). Next year he was invited by the Jagiellonian University and moved to Kraków. He was appointed professor and chairman of Department of Physics of the Jagiellonian University.

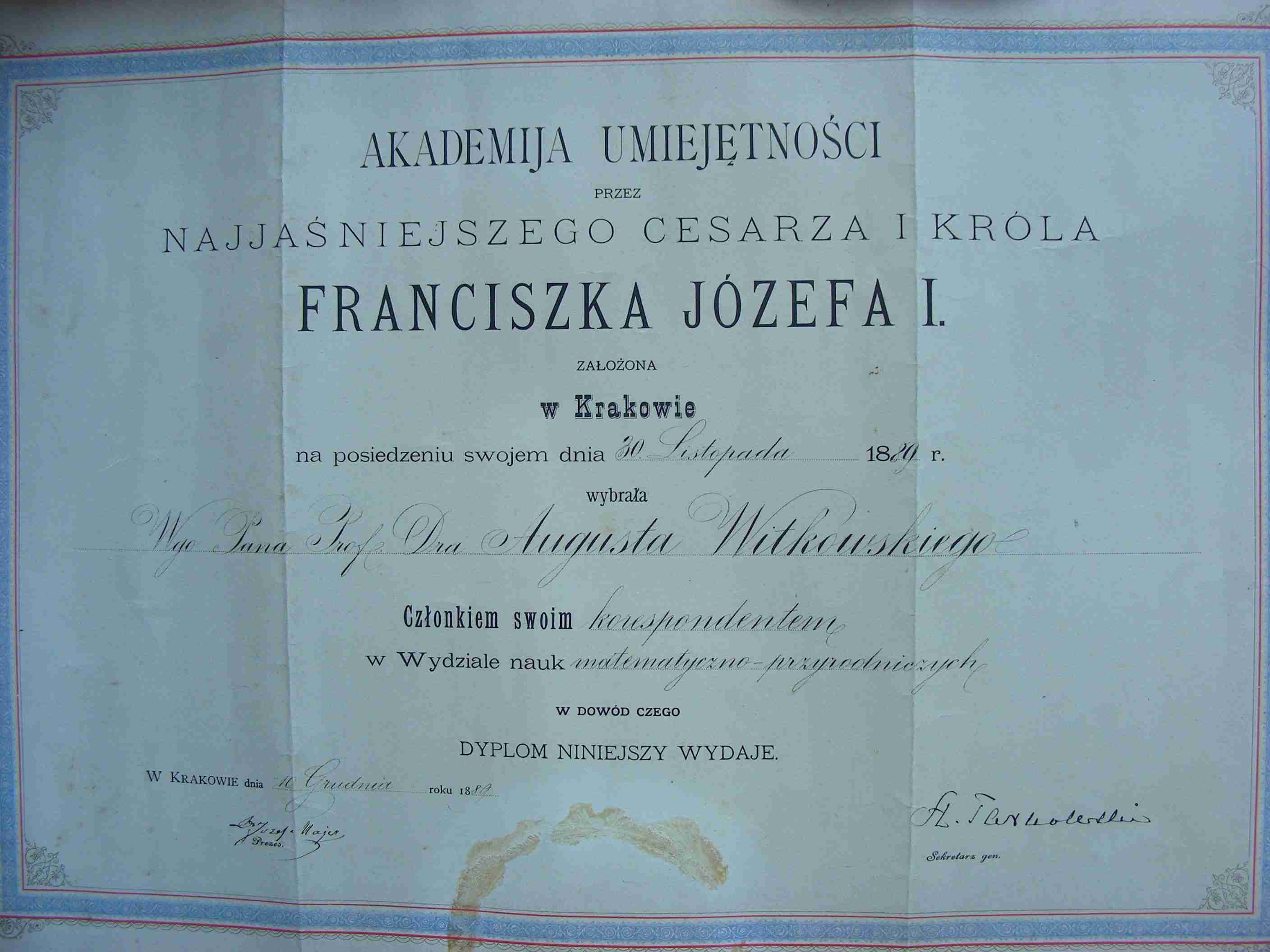
August Witkowski certificate of associateship of Academy of Learning, Kraków, 1889

In 1889 he became associate member and in 1893 a fellow of Academy of Learning in Kraków. In 1892 the Jagiellonian University and in 1912 Technical University granted him a "doctor honoris causa" degree. The foundation of a new building of Physics Department in Jagiellonian University (finished in 1912) – was mainly Witkowski contribution.

That building was the Collegium Witkowskiego named after him. Shortly after his death, he was proclaimed its patron (later – in 2017 – the history department). In 1920 and 1921 he was also made a patron of two high schools in Poland: August Witkowski 5th High School in Kraków and August Witkowski Geodetic school in Jarosław.

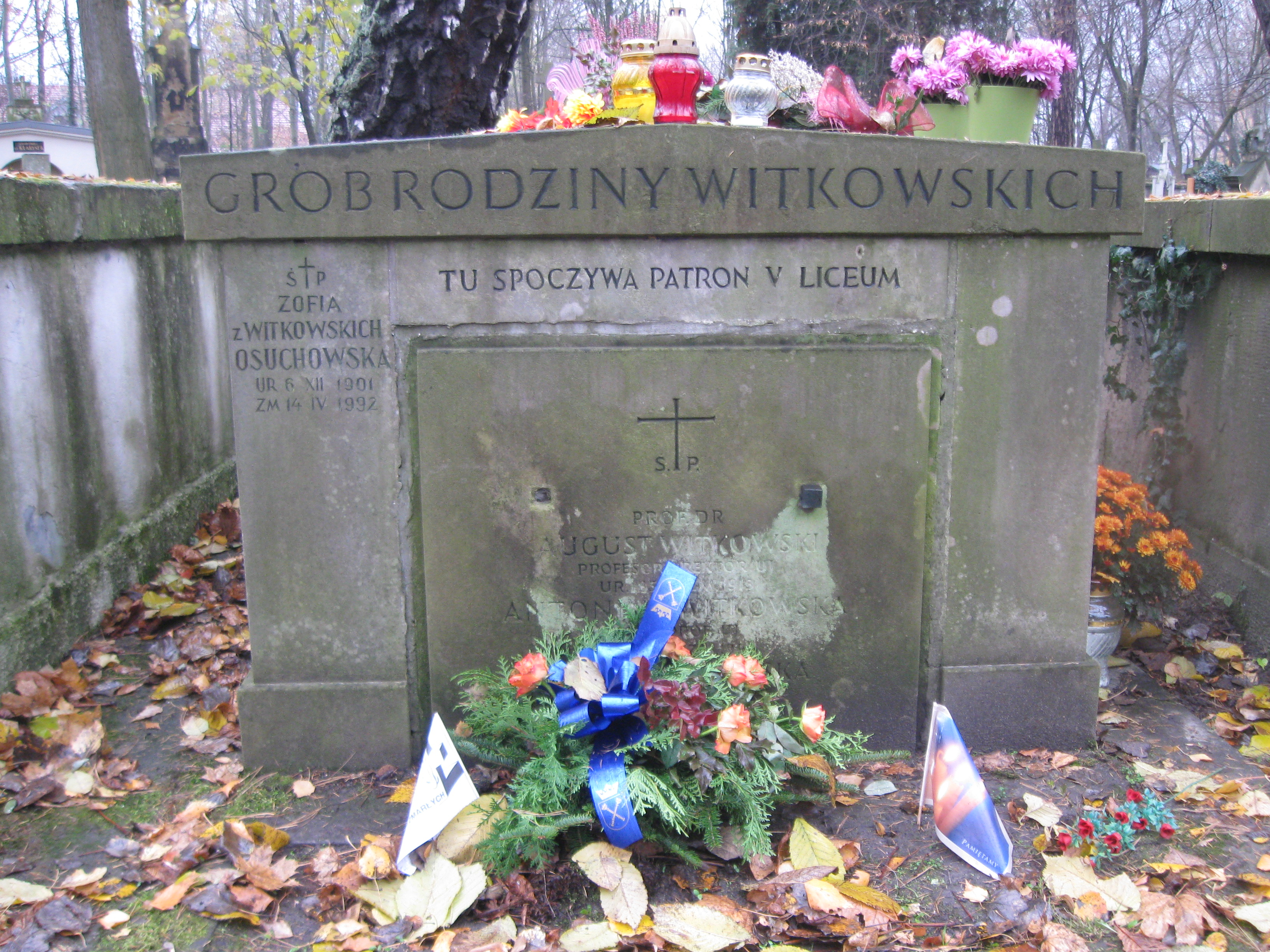
August Witkowski Roman Catholic grave in Rakowicki Cemetery

In 1910 he became a president of the Jagiellonian University (1910–1911). He died in 1913 and was buried at the Rakowicki Cemetery (in his Roman Catholic tomb, section Ł, 24 January).

== Work ==
He worked mostly as an experimental physicist. His research interests concentrated mostly in the physical properties and laws concerning gases especially in low temperatures. In this way, he contributed also in meteorology by his research of expansion and compressibility of atmospheric air and by his investigation of thermodynamic properties of air He was interested as well in electric phenomena in atmosphere. He ran investigation of atmosphere electricity in mountain environment.

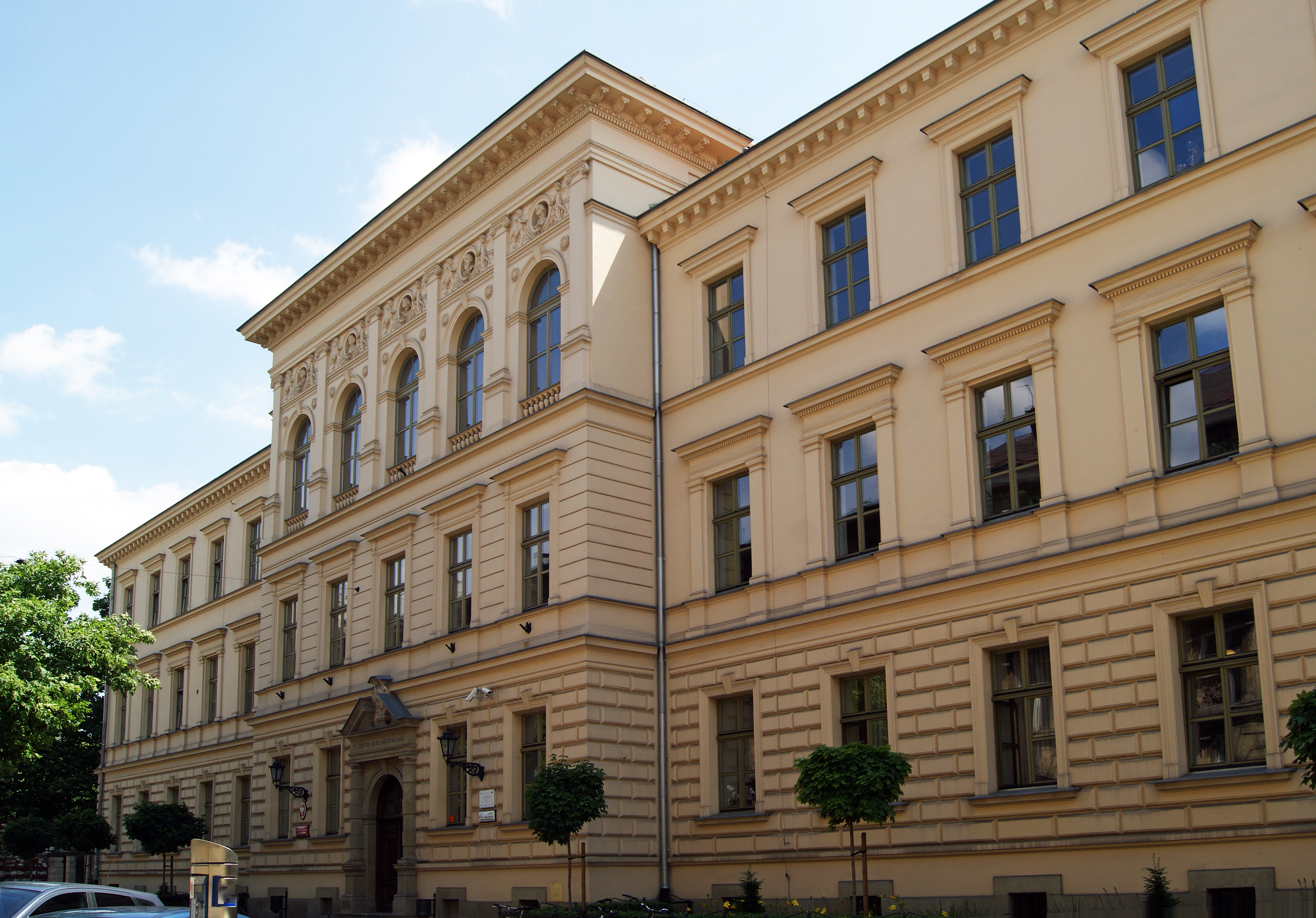
August Witkowski 5th High School, 12 Studencka street, Kraków, Poland

His research activities were also connected with new achievements of his Polish colleagues Zygmunt Wróblewski and Karol Olszewski who condensed and liquefied oxygen, nitrogen, hydrogen and other gases in a record low temperature of −225 °C (48 K). He was interested in optical properties of liquified gases He investigated as well acoustic properties of compressed air – speed of sound in air etc.

In addition to his main contribution to experimental physics, he also ran in later years of his scientific activity some interesting theoretical enquiries concerning e.g. the physical fundamentals of harmony, the principle of relativity and the electromagnetic fundamentals of light.

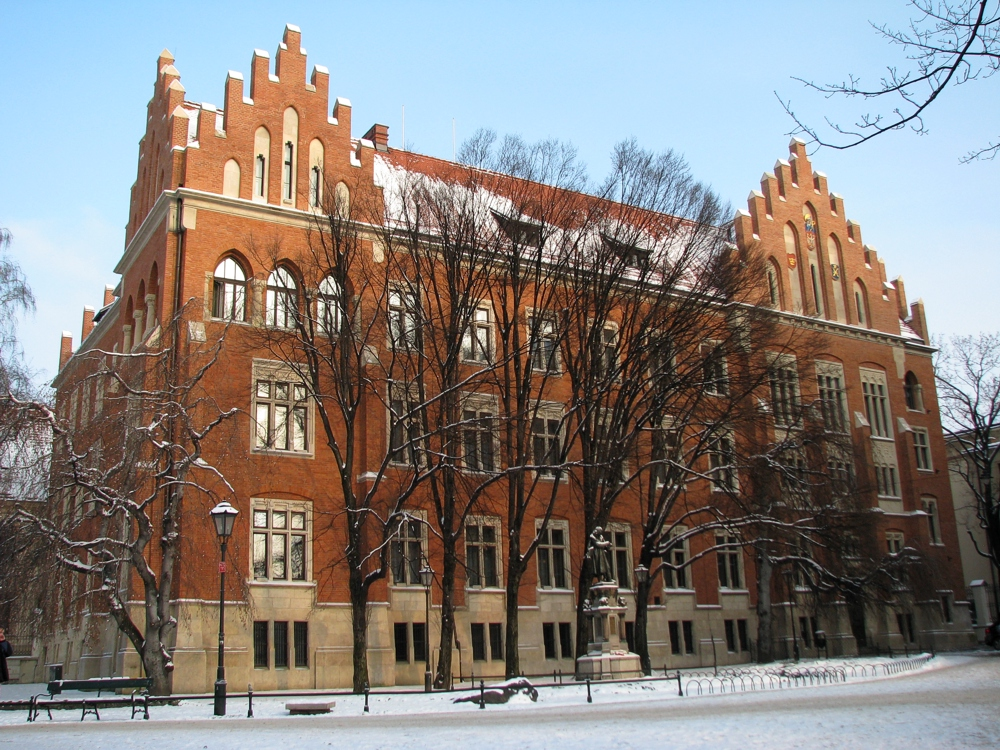
Collegium Witkowskiego in Jagiellonian University (originally – the physics department, in 2017 – the history department, located at ulica Gołębia (Dove Street) 13 in Kraków, Poland)

The main Witkowski achievements as academic teacher were a three volumes of handbook of physics, which were the basis of academic education of several generations of Polish physicists. He published also mathematical and physical tables for students.

== Selected works ==
- (in Polish) Wiadomości początkowe z gieografii fizycznéj i meteorologii (Initial Information on Physical Geography and Meteorology), Warsaw, 1884;
- (in French) Thermomètre électrique pour les basses températures (The Electric Thermometer for Low Temperatures), Kraków, 1891;
- (in French) Sur la dilatation et la compressibilité de l'air atmosphérique (On The Expansion and Compressibility of Atmospheric Air), Kraków [1891], ed. Jagiellonian University;
- (in Polish) O mierzeniu niskich temperatur (On The Measurement of Low Temperatures), Kraków, 1891, ed. by Academy of Learning;
- (in Polish) O rozszerzalności i ściśliwości powietrza (On The Expansibility and Compressibility of Air), Kraków, 1891, ed. by Academy of Learning;
- (in French) Propriétes optiques de l'oxygéne liquide (On Optical Properties of Liquid Oxygen) by Karol Olszewski and August Wiktor Witkowski, Kraków, 1892;
- (in Polish) Zasady fizyki (The Principles of Physics) – vol.1–3, Warsaw, 1892–1912, ed. by Księgarnia E. Wende i S-ka;
- (in Polish) O własnościach optycznych ciekłego tlenu (On The Optical Properties of Liquid Oxygen) – by Karol Olszewski, and August Wiktor Witkowski, Kraków 1893, ed. by Academy of Learning;
- (in French) Sur la dispersion de la lumière dans l'oxygène liquide (On The Dispersion of Light in Liquid Oxygen) by Karol Olszewski and August Wiktor Witkowski, Kraków, 1894, ed. Jagiellonian University.
- (in Polish) O własnościach termodynamicznych powietrza (On The Thermodynamic Properties of Air), 1896;
- (in Polish) O oziębianiu się powietrza wskutek rozprężenia nieodwracalego (On The Cooling of Air by Irreversible Decompressing), Kraków 1898, ed. by Academy of Learning;
- (in Polish) O prędkości głosu w powietrzu zgęszczonem (On The Speed of Sound in Compressed Air), Kraków, 1899, ed. by Academy of Learning;
- (in Polish) O podstawach fizycznych harmonii (On The Physical Fundamentals of Harmony), Warsaw 1899, [s.fn.];
- (in Polish) Spostrzeżenia nad elektrycznością atmosferyczną w Zakopanem (The Remarks on The Atmospheric Electricity in Zakopane), Kraków 1902, ed. by Academy of Learning;
- (in Polish) Tablice logarytmowe i goniometryczne czterocyfrowe (The 4-digit Logarithmic and Goniometric Tables), Warsaw, 1903, ed. by "Wiadomości Matematyczne" ("Mathematical News");
- (in Polish) Tablice matematyczno-fizyczne (The Mathematical and Physical Tables), Warsaw 1904, ed. by "Wiadomości Matematyczne" ("Mathematical News");
- (in French) Sur la dilatation de l'hydrogène (On The Expansion of Hydrogen), Kraków 1905, ed. Imprimerie de l'Universite;
- (in Polish) O rozszerzalności wodoru (On The Expansibility of Hydrogen), Kraków, 1905, ed. by Academy of Learning;
- (in Polish) Elektryczność i magnetyzm (The Electricity and Magnetism), Kraków 1905, ed. "Kółko matematyczne" ("Mathematical Circle"),
- (in Polish) O zasadzie względności (On The Principle of Relativity ), Kraków, 1909, ed. by Academy of Learning;
- (in Polish) Teorya elektromagnetyczna światła (The Electromagnetic Theory of Light), Kraków 1910, ed. by H. Scherer & K. Zurzycki;

== Bibliography ==
- (in Polish) Witkowski August [- entry in:] Leksykon PWN, Warsaw, 1972, p. 1284;
- (in Polish) Maria Pawłowska – Jagiellonian University (Kraków): KRAKOWSKO-LWOWSKIE PORTRETY NAUKOWE PROFESORÓW FIZYKI DOŚWIADCZALNEJ W XIX I PIERWSZEJ POŁOWIE XX WIEKU, I ICH KSIĘGOZBIORY
- (in Polish) Konstanty Zakrzewski: O działalności naukowej ś.p. Augusta Witkowskiego ("On Late August Witkowski scientific activity") – Lecture in Polskie Towarzystwo Przyrodników im. Kopernika in Kraków, 1913, 12 June, [published in:] "Wiadomości Matematyczne" ("Mathematical News"), 1913, vol.5–6 p. 211–224;
- (in Polish) Władysław Natanson, Kilka słów wspomnień o Auguście Witkowskim (A Few Words Concerning August Witkowski Memory). "Wiadomości Matematyczne" ("Mathematical News") 1913, vol. 17, p. 93.
- August Witkowski – WorldCat – see: https://www.worldcat.org/identities/viaf-54929460/.
