= Vitkovsky =

Vitkovsky, feminine: Vitkovskaya is a Russian-language surname. Notable people with the surname include:

- Vladimir Vitkovsky (1885 – 1978), Russian White Army general in the Russian Civil War.
- Yevgeny Vitkovsky (1950 – 2020), Russian writer, poet, and translator

== See also ==
- Witkowski
- Wittkowski
- Vitkauskas
