= August Witkowski 5th Secondary School in Kraków =

Coordinates: 50.0623°N 19.9288°E

August Witkowski 5th High School in Kraków
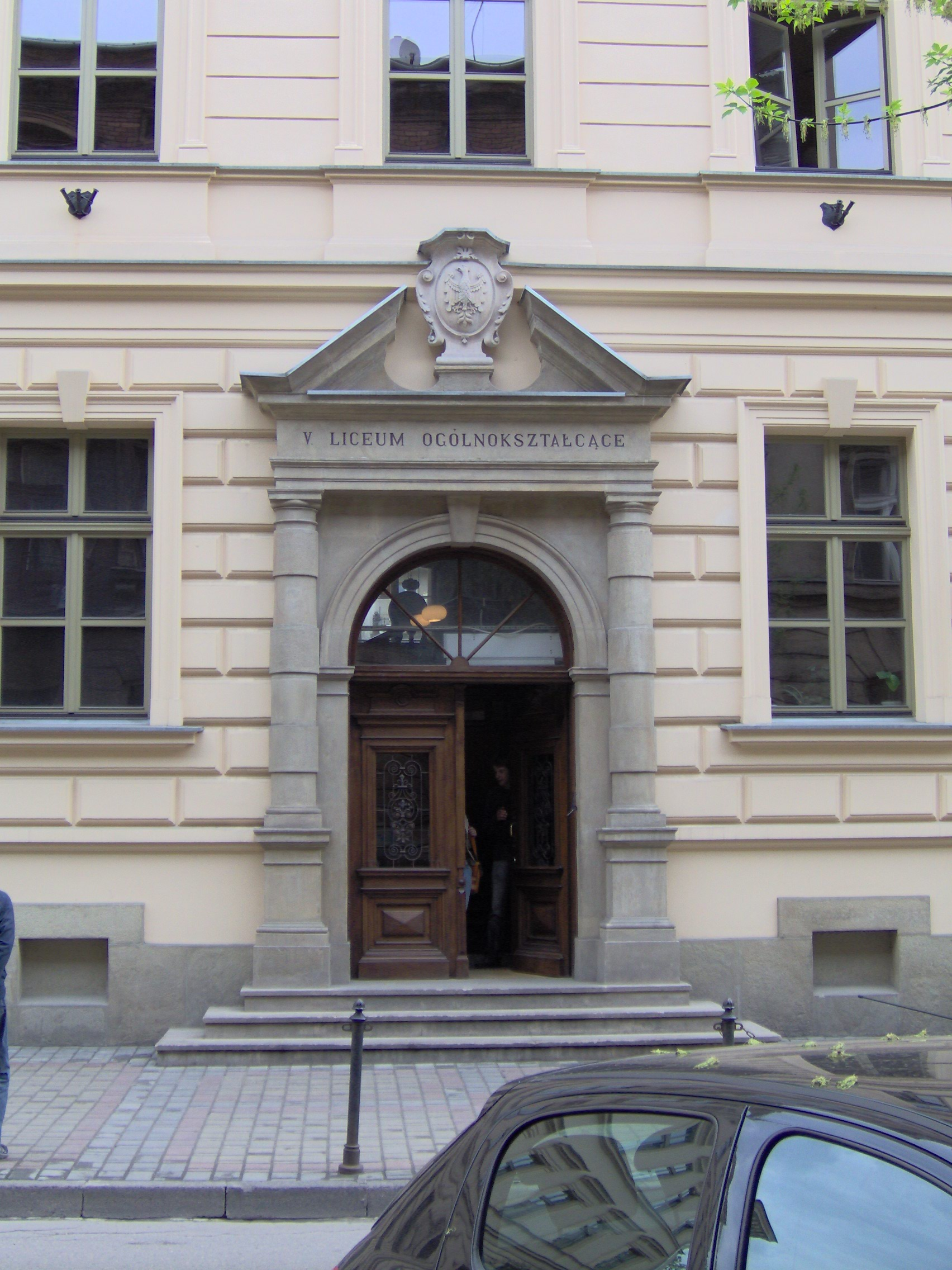

Location
- 12 Studencka Street; Kraków, Małopolska; Poland

Information
- Type: Liceum ogólnokształcące
- Motto: Dużo wiedzieć jest rzeczą piękną, ale nierównie ważniejsze jest umieć dowiedzieć się czegoś. (It is beautiful to know a lot, yet it is far more important to know how to learn something.)
- Established: 1871; 155 years ago
- Principal: Mr Stanisław Pietras
- Campus: Urban
- Colour: Burgundy
- Website: www.v-lo.krakow.pl

August Witkowski 5th High School (Polish: V Liceum Ogólnokształcące im. Augusta Witkowskiego) in Kraków, Poland, is one of the oldest secondary schools in the city, founded in 1871 by Franz Joseph I of Austria. The school is located on 12 Studencka Street, in close proximity to Kraków Old Town.

== History ==
The school was established in 1871 by Franz Joseph I of Austria as the Higher Real School in Kraków, focusing mainly on natural and technical sciences. Since the teaching was conducted in Polish, the school was of paramount importance for the Poles, who at that time did not have their own nation-state.

In 1896 the school moved to its current Neo-Renaissance building on 12 Studencka Street. Simultaneously, it had also become one of the most acclaimed educational establishments in Galicia, primarily owing to the excellence of its teachers, many of whom were recruited from among the professors of the Jagiellonian University and the Kraków Academy of Fine Arts.

During World War I the school housed a military hospital and many of its alumni fought in the conflict. After Poland regained independence, in 1921 the school changed its name to August Witkowski 8th State Mathematical and Natural Sciences Gymnasium, in honour of Professor August Witkowski, an acclaimed physicist and rector of the Jagiellonian University. Excelling particularly in Maths and Physics, the school maintained its educational renown also during the interwar period, and its alumni were accepted without admission exams to the Lviv Polytechnic, deemed to be the best technical university in Poland at the time.

The school and its community suffered heavy losses during World War II, but no sooner did the Nazi occupation of Poland come to an end than the classes promptly resumed and already in 1945 first students sat their school-leaving exams.

In 1956 the school made a final change of its name to become known as August Witkowski 5th High School in Kraków. Likewise from the 1950s, the school began to embrace the humanities subjects, as its principal Stanisław Potoczek (1954-1972) founded a school theatre that premiered over 20 plays and gave over 500 performances to audiences totalling over 100,000 people during 17 years of its existence. The school further developed during the tenure of Mieczysław Stefanów (1972-1992) who created the first classes devoted purely to humanities, as well as he established scientific collaboration between the school and the Jagiellonian University in sciences.

Since 1992 the principal of the school is Stanisław Pietras. Among his most notable achievements are the establishment of the Association of Friends and Alumni of the 5th High School in Kraków (SAiP) in 1995, and a thorough refurbishment of the school's facade and roof. Likewise, in the last 30 years, the school gained nationwide renown for its quality and especially for the successes of its students in nationwide and international competitions. This has been reflected by its continuous presence in the top 6 high schools in Poland in the Perspektywy High School Rankings since 2001.

== Student life ==
Students at August Witkowski 5th High School enjoy a broad range of extra-curricular activities. They range from the school choir and Oxford debate club to sports and scientific societies to regular student concerts held annually for Christmas and Carnival. The school has partnerships with educational institutions in Germany, Sweden and Italy.

== Notable alumni ==
- Alicja Bachleda-Curuś – actress and singer
- Jerzy Bahr – diplomat
- Józef Beck – Polish Minister of Foreign Affairs (1932–1939)
- Wojciech Bonowicz – poet
- Jerzy Fedorowicz – actor and politician
- Jan Frycz – actor
- Marek Kusto – Polish footballer and manager
- Ludwik de Leveaux – Polish military general
- Edward Madejski – footballer and chemistry engineer
- Robert Makłowicz – journalist, historian and television personality
- Andrzej Munk – film director and screenwriter
- Adam Nawałka – Polish national football team manager
- Tadeusz Pacuła – basketball player
- Jan Rokita – politician
- Adam Daniel Rotfeld – Polish Minister of Foreign Affairs (2005)
- Mieczysław Szumiec – footballer
- Małgorzata Szumowska – film director, screenwriter and producer
- Grzegorz Turnau – composer, pianist, poet and singer
- Antoni Wit – conductor
- Jerzy Wojnar – pilot and luger

== See also ==
- Bartłomiej Nowodworski High School
- King John III Sobieski 2nd High School (Kraków)
