= Sergei Alexandrovsky =

Russian poet and translator (born 1956)

Sergei A. Alexandrovsky
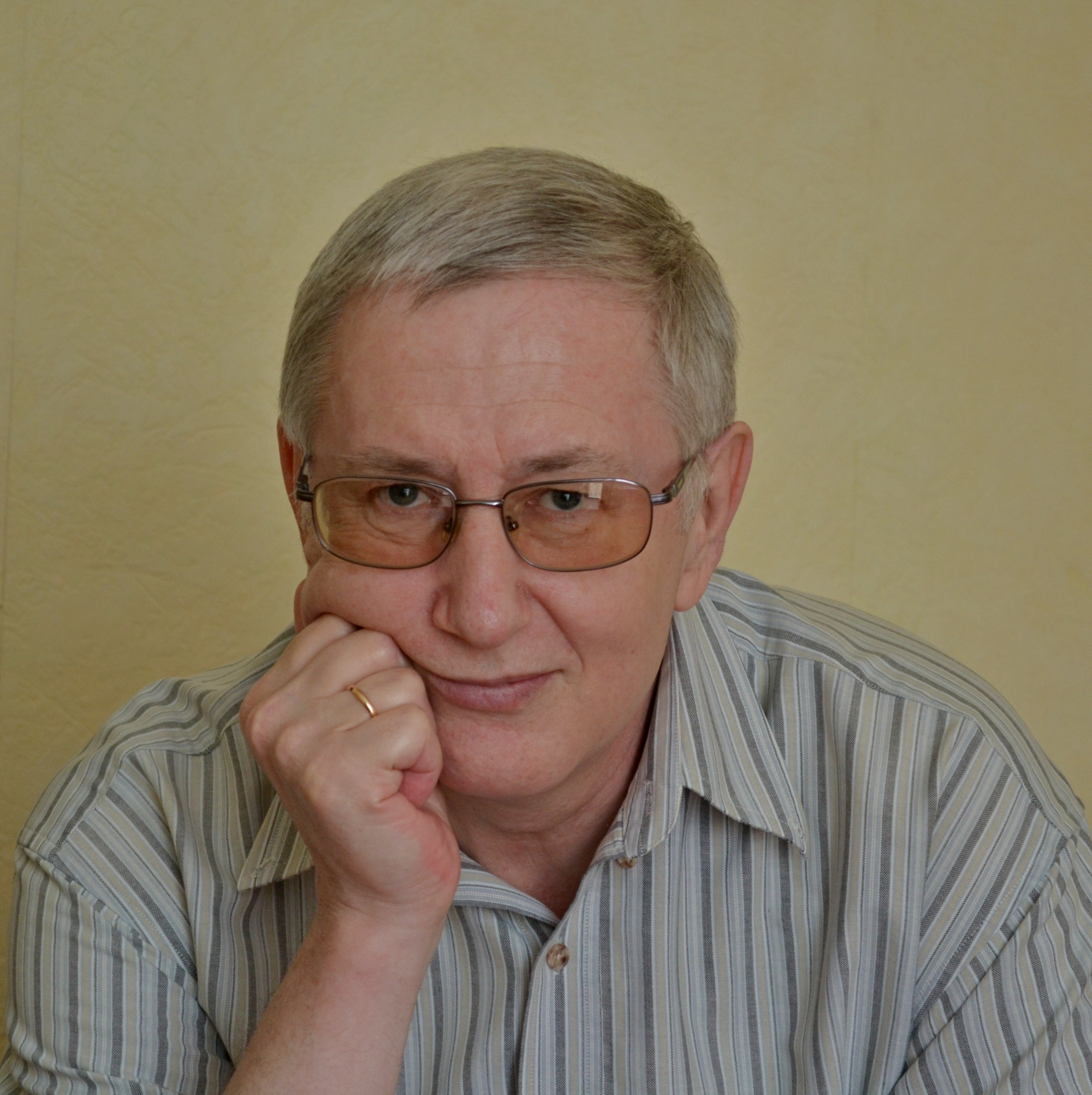
- Born: 21 November 1956 (age 69); Kharkiv
- Citizenship: USSR / Ukraine
- Occupations: Poet, translator
- Spouse(s): Lily Alexandrovsky, writer
- Writing career
- Language: Russian
- Period: 1970s–present
- Genres: poetry, translations

Sergei A. Alexandrovsky (Сергей Анатольевич Александро́вский; born 21 November 1956, Kharkiv) is a Ukrainian poet and translator who writes in Russian language.

== Background ==
From 1977 to 1982, Alexandrovsky studied English at the University of Kharkiv and continues to reside in Kharkiv, Ukraine. His full-time literary career as a translator of poetry from the English, Spanish and Portuguese started in 1989. Since then Alexandrovsky rendered into Russian numerous lyrics and long poems by Fernando Pessoa, Julián del Casal, José Martí, John Lydgate, Francis Bacon, Fulke Greville, John Milton, Allan Ramsey, Robert Burns, Robert Fergusson, Robert Southey, John Keats, Rudyard Kipling, Sir Arthur Conan Doyle, many other English and Scottish authors. Among his works are the first Russian-language versions of The Boke of the Duchesse and The Parlement of Foules by Geoffrey Chaucer, The Shepheardes Calender by Edmund Spenser, The Cherrie and the Slae and Sonnets by Alexander Montgomerie, The Cap and Bells; or, the Jealousies by John Keats..

In the late 1980s, Alexandrovsky attended poetic seminar headed by Eugen V. Witkowsky whom he calls his principal literary guide.

John Milton's Paradise Regained translated by Sergei Alexandrovsky was published in 2006 by the Russian Academy of Sciences in a volume of the Literary Landmarks (Литературные памятники) series (Джон Милтон. «Потерянный рай. Возвращённый рай. Другие поэтические произведения». Илл. Г. Доре. — М.: «Наука», 2006).

Alexandrovsky's poetic translations were printed in several major anthologies, including the three-volume Seven Centuries of English Poetry (Семь веков английской поэзии, М.: 2007).

Since 2000, original lyrics by Sergei Alexandrovsky periodically appeared in Russian-language literary magazines published overseas (Новый Журнал / The New Review, New York City and other). In 2007, Vodoley Publishers (Moscow) released Факсимиле (Facsimile), Alexandrovsky's book of poems and selected translations. His second book, На задворках мира. Стихотворения (The World's Backyard. Poems) issued in 2019 by the same publishing company, contains ninety-three original pieces of poetry.

== Works ==
- Сергей Александровский. Факсимиле. Стихотворения и переводы. — М.: Водолей Publishers, 2007. — 104 с. (Серия «Сон Серебряного века»). ISBN 978-5-9796-0109-0
- Сергей Александровский. На задворках мира. Стихотворения. — М.: Водолей, 2019. — 164 с. ISBN 978-5-91763-463-0
- Джон Мильтон. Возвращённый Рай. Перевод с английского Сергея Александровского. — М.: Время, 2001. — 191 с.: с илл. — (Серия «Триумфы»). ISBN 5-94117-015-7
- Джеффри Чосер. Книга о королеве. Птичий парламент. Перевод с английского, предисловие и комментарии Сергея Александровского. — М.: Время, 2004. — 224 с.: с илл. — (Серия «Триумфы»). ISBN 5-94117-146-3
- Александр Монтгомери. Вишня и Тёрн. Сонеты. Перевод Сергея Александровского. Составитель и научный редактор Е. Витковский. — М.: Водолей Publishers, 2007. — 232 с. ISBN 5-902312-98-1
- Хулиан дель Касаль. Хосе Марти. Средь сумерек и теней. Избранные стихотворения. Перевод с испанского Сергея Александровского. — М.: Водолей, 2011. — 256 с. — (Звезды зарубежной поэзии). ISBN 978-5-91763-073-1
- Джон Китс. Малые поэмы. Перевод с английского Сергея Александровского. — М.: Водолей, 2012. — 100 с. — (Пространство перевода). ISBN 978-5-91763-104-2
- Из шотландской поэзии XVI-XIX вв. Перевод Сергея Александровского. — М.: Водолей, 2012. — 132 с. — (Пространство перевода). ISBN 978-5-91763-113-4
- Эдмунд Спенсер. Пастуший календарь. Перевод С. А. Александровского. — В кн.: Художественный перевод и сравнительное литературоведение : сборник научных трудов / отв. ред. Д. Н. Жаткин. — Вып. IV, М.: ФЛИНТА, Наука, 2015. — С. 220—281. ISBN 978-5-9765-2361-6 (ФЛИНТА), ISBN 978-5-02-038909-0 (Наука) и вып. V, М.: ФЛИНТА, Наука, 2016. — С. 284—331. ISBN 978-5-9765-2546-7 (ФЛИНТА), ISBN 978-5-02-038967-0 (Наука)
