= Alexander Montgomerie =

Scottish courtier and poet

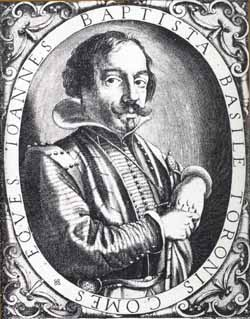
Portrait of a courtier poet typical in Montgomerie's day

Alexander Montgomerie (Scottish Gaelic: Alasdair Mac Gumaraid) (c. 1550?–1598) was a Scottish Jacobean courtier and poet, or makar, born in Ayrshire. He was a Scottish Gaelic speaker and a Scots speaker from Ayrshire, an area which was still part of the Scottish Gàidhealtachd in his day. He was one of the principal members of the Castalian Band, a circle of poets in the court of James VI in the 1580s which included the king himself. Montgomerie was for a time in favour as one of the king's "favourites". He was a Catholic in a largely Protestant court and his involvement in political controversy led to his expulsion as an outlaw in the mid-1590s.

Montgomerie's poetry, much of which examines themes of love, includes autobiographical sonnets and foreshadows the later metaphysical poets in England. He is sometimes, by tradition, given the epithet "Captain".

== Early life ==
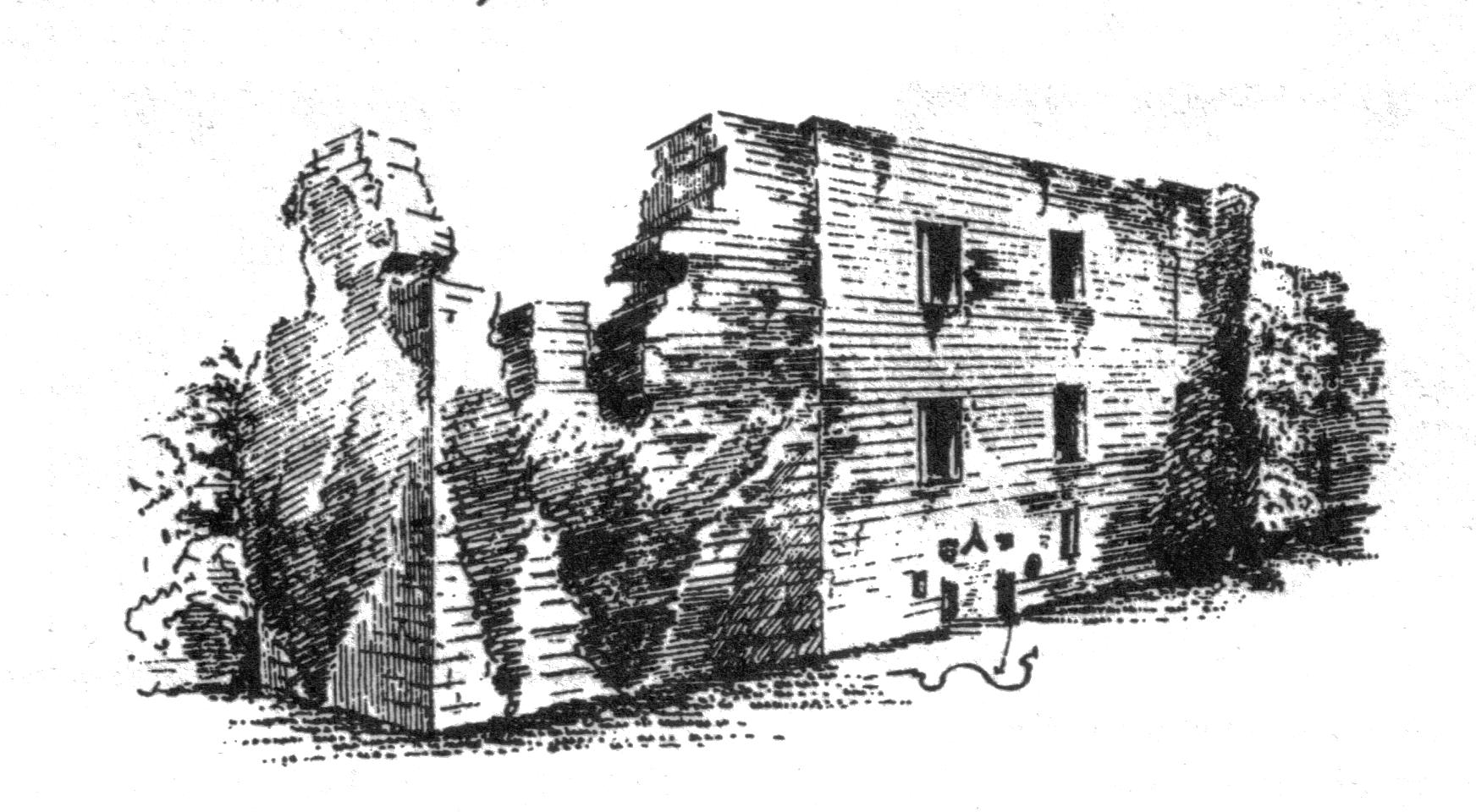
Hessilhead Castle, Ayrshire, in a drawing of 1887.

Montgomerie was a younger son of the Ayrshire laird Hugh Montgomerie of Hessilhead (d. 1558) and so was related to the Earl of Eglinton, and a distant relation of James VI.

Nothing is known for certain about his life before about 1580, but contemporary or near-contemporary accounts suggest that he was brought up as a member of the Church of Scotland, spent some time in Argyll before leaving for the Continent, and was converted to Catholicism in Spain. He probably saw active service as a soldier for the Scottish forces in The Netherlands in the later 1570s, although there is no certain documentary evidence of this.

Montgomerie's arrival in Edinburgh may have been linked in some way to that of the king's Catholic, French-born kinsman Esmé Stewart, whose ascendancy at court coincides with the period of the poet's greatest prominence (1580–86).

== Works ==
It is likely that his earliest surviving poems are The Navigation and the related Cartel of the Thre Ventrous Knichts, which may well have been written for performance at court at Epiphany 1580. The Navigatioun involves the torchlit entrance at Holyrood Palace of a narrator and his companions, a "Turk, the More, and the Egyptien". The court musicians were bought "mask claithis" comprising red and yellow taffeta with swords and daggers. Montgomerie's prologue alludes to the Magi and Epiphany to flatter James VI as the Northern Star. James was also characterised as Solomon. The masque was followed by dancing.

Montgomerie came to prominence as "laureled" leader of the Castalian Band, a circle of court poets headed by the King after being declared victor over a rival poet, Patrick Hume of Polwarth, in a comically scurrilous flyting, or poetic duel. The King, who was himself a practising member of the group, referred to Montgomerie as its 'maister poete'.

A number of Montgomerie's poems can be assigned to the first half of the 1580s, including sonnets, court songs, and the first, unfinished version of his longest work, the allegorical Cherrie and the Slae. Like some other pieces, it may have been written (at least in part) by autumn 1584, for the 19-year-old king included a passage from it in his literary manifesto Some Reulis and Cautelis to be observit and eschewit in Scottis poesie, published around September of that year.

== Courtier ==
As early as 27 July 1583 Montgomerie was granted a pension by the king, drawn from the revenues of Glasgow Cathedral. His career had evidently survived the temporary imprisonment of James by a militant Protestant faction led by the Earl of Gowrie, and the exile and death of Esmé Stewart, whom James had made Duke of Lennox. But there seems to have been a fundamental change in the culture of the court towards the end of 1585, when the king took personal control of the government, and in the summer of 1586 Montgomerie joined an enlarged Scottish contingent fighting for the Dutch Republic against the Spanish.

He stayed there for more than two years, serving at Zutphen at the same time as the unfortunate Sir Philip Sidney, and eventually experiencing severe financial difficulties as a result of non-payment by the Dutch authorities. He eventually struck a deal with the States of Holland in February 1588, and was back in Scotland by the end of the year.

Life at court was now very different from what it had been before Montgomerie's departure, not least because of (justified) allegations of intrigue between leading Catholic aristocrats and the Spanish. On a more personal level, the poet's pension had been claimed by someone else during his absence, and a long legal struggle ended in defeat for Montgomerie in July 1593. This battle produced some of his most remarkable poetry, increasingly embittered sonnets encouraging, cajoling, and eventually attacking the judges and lawyers involved, and even the king himself. At the same time, he continued to write formal poems about life at court, while some undated songs and other verses may well also come from this period.

== Expulsion and death ==
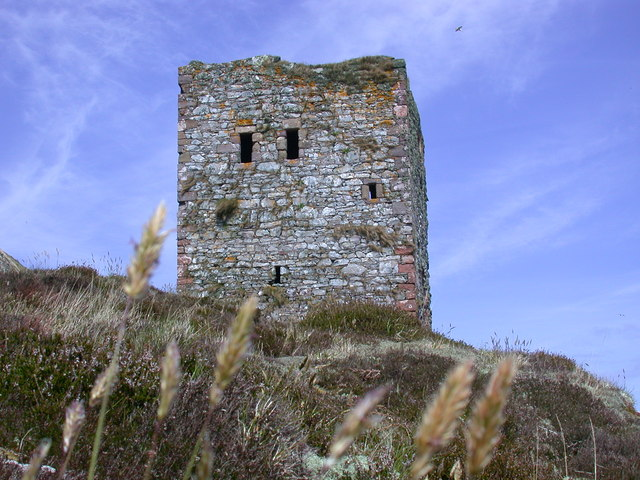
The Castle on the island of Ailsa Craig

Mongomerie largely disappears from view after the collapse of his legal case, until he became involved, in late 1596 or early 1597, in a Catholic plot to seize the rocky outcrop of Ailsa Craig, in the lower Firth of Clyde, as support for a Spanish intervention in the Earl of Tyrone's rebellion in Ireland. Led by Montgomerie's friend and fellow-poet Hugh Barclay of Ladyland, this enterprise soon collapsed, Barclay being killed in the process, and on 14 July 1597 Montgomerie was declared an outlaw.

He may have planned to leave the country, perhaps to go to the Scottish Benedictine monastery in Würzburg, but he was still in Scotland at the time of his death in August 1598. His death proved as controversial as much of his life, for the authorities of the Canongate Kirk in Edinburgh refused to allow him to be buried in the churchyard on the grounds of his Catholicism, only an intervention by the king himself forcing them to change their minds. Montgomerie's exact place of burial is unknown, but it must have been in the church or grounds of Holyrood Abbey, which was then used by the Canongate congregation.

== Literary assessment ==
Montgomerie's poetic output of over 100 pieces is mostly known from just one witness, the Ker manuscript, presented to Edinburgh University Library by the poet William Drummond of Hawthornden. It is possible that this was assembled from Montgomerie's papers soon after his death; it must, in any case, have been written soon afterwards.

The range of his work is extensive, from elegant court songs including Lyk as the dum Solsequium and Melancholie, grit deput of Dispair to the bitter, sometimes contorted word-play of the sonnets associated with the dispute over his pension, from witty pieces addressed to the king to the profound religious sensibility of A godly prayer and the extraordinary Come, my childrene dere. Montgomerie is one of the finest of Middle Scots poets, and perhaps the greatest Scottish exponent of the sonnet form (although the twentieth-century poets Robert Garioch and Edwin Morgan were also fine sonnetteers).

The Cherrie and the Slae, which he probably revised and completed shortly before his death, is an ambitious religious allegory, employing a demanding, lyrical stanza form which suggests that it was intended for singing, despite its considerable length. His poetry reaches back to the earlier makars, Henryson, Dunbar and Douglas, but he also translates from Clément Marot and from Ronsard, and some of his work invites comparison with Baroque writers such as Marino, Góngora, Donne and Herbert.

== Bibliography ==
- Alexander Montgomerie, Poems, ed. David Parkinson (Edinburgh: Scottish Text Society, 2000)
- Alexander Montgomerie. A selection from his songs and poems. Ed. & Introduced by Helena M. Shire. Pub. Oliver & Boyd for The Saltire Society. (1960).

== Selected early imprints ==
The text of the frontispieces of three early imprints of works by Montgomerie run as follows:

- The Cherrie and the Slae. Composed into Scottis Meeter, be Alexander Mongomerie. Prented according to a Copie corrected be the Author himselfe. Edinburgh. Prented be Robert Waldegrave, prenter to the Kings Majestie. Anno 1597. Cum Privilegio Regio.
- The Mindes Melodie. Contayning certayne Psalmes of the Kinglie Propheete David, applyed to a new pleasant tune, verie comfortable to everie one that is rightlie acquainted therewith. Edinburgh. Printed be Robert Charteris, printer to the King's most Excellent Maiestie. 1605. Cum Priuilegio Regali.
- The Flyting betwixt Montgomery and Polwart. Edinburgh. Printed by the Heires of Andro Hart, 1629.

== Discography ==
- Thus spak Apollo myne: The songs of Alexander Montgomerie. Paul Rendall (tenor) and Rob MacKillop (lute). Gaudeamus CD GAU 249

== See also ==
- Hessilhead
- Scottish literature

== Translations ==
- Александр Монтгомери. Вишня и Тёрн. Сонеты. Перевод Сергея Александровского. Составитель и научный редактор Е. Витковский. – М.: Водолей Publishers, 2007 (Alexander Montgomerie. The Cherrie and the Slae. Sonnets. Translation by Sergei Alexandrovsky. Foreword, ed. and annotations by Eugen V. Witkowsky. М., 2007)
