= Mohamed Aden Sheikh =

Somali medical doctor and politician

Mohamed Aden Sheikh محمد آدم الشيخ

Minister of Education Somalia

Writer Politician scholer Doctor
- In office 4 Novenbar 1988 – 17 January 1990
- Prime Minister: Abdirahman Jama Bare

Minister of Health of Somalia
- In office 4 November 1980 – 17 January 1970

Minister of Information of Somalia

Personal details
- Born: 1936 Gallaadi, Ethiopia
- Party: SYL

Mohamed Aden Sheikh (c. 1936 – 30 September 2010) was a Somali medical doctor and politician who held posts as Minister of Health, Minister of Education, and Minister of Information.

Aden was the first Somali surgeon who received his medical training at the University of Rome and practiced at Mogadishu General Hospital. He hails from the Marehan clan. He enter politics in the 1970s and held various cabinet positions. Aden was also a central committee member of the only political party allowed in Somalia, the Somali Revolutionary Socialist Party. On 9 June 1982, he was one of seven parliamentarians arrested and accused of treason for having criticized the government of President Siad Barre. Aden was the president of the Somali National Academy of Sciences and Arts at the time of his arrest.

He was also the former Head of the Ideology Bureau SRRC and Somali Technological Development.
