= Wilkowski =

Wilkowski or Wolkowski is a Polish surname. Notable people with the surname include:

- Arthur Wilkowski (1928–1999), American politician
- Jan Wilkowski (1921–1997), Polish dramaticist, author, actor, director
- Jean M. Wilkowski (1919–2016), American diplomat, first woman to serve as ambassador to an African country
- Renata Pałys (née Wilkowska; born 1956), Polish actress

== See also ==
- Witkowski
- Bogdan Wołkowski (born 1957), Polish billiards player
