= Wittkowski =

Wittkowski (Polish-language feminine: Wittkowska, German language: gender-neutral) is a German-language surname. Notable people with the surname include:

- Margarete Wittkowski (1910–1974), German economist and politician
- Marta Wittkowska, (1882 – 1977), Polish–American contralto opera
- Whitey Witt (1895–1988), born Ladislaw Waldemar Wittkowski, American baseball player

== See also ==
- Witkowski
- Vitkovsky
