= FIL European Luge Championships 1935 =

The FIL European Luge Championships 1935 took place in Krynica, Poland under the auspices of the Fédération Internationale de Bobsleigh et de Tobogganing (FIBT - International Bobsleigh and Tobogganing Federation in (in French)) under their "Section de Luge", a trend that would continue until the International Luge Federation (FIL) was formed in 1957.

== Men's singles ==
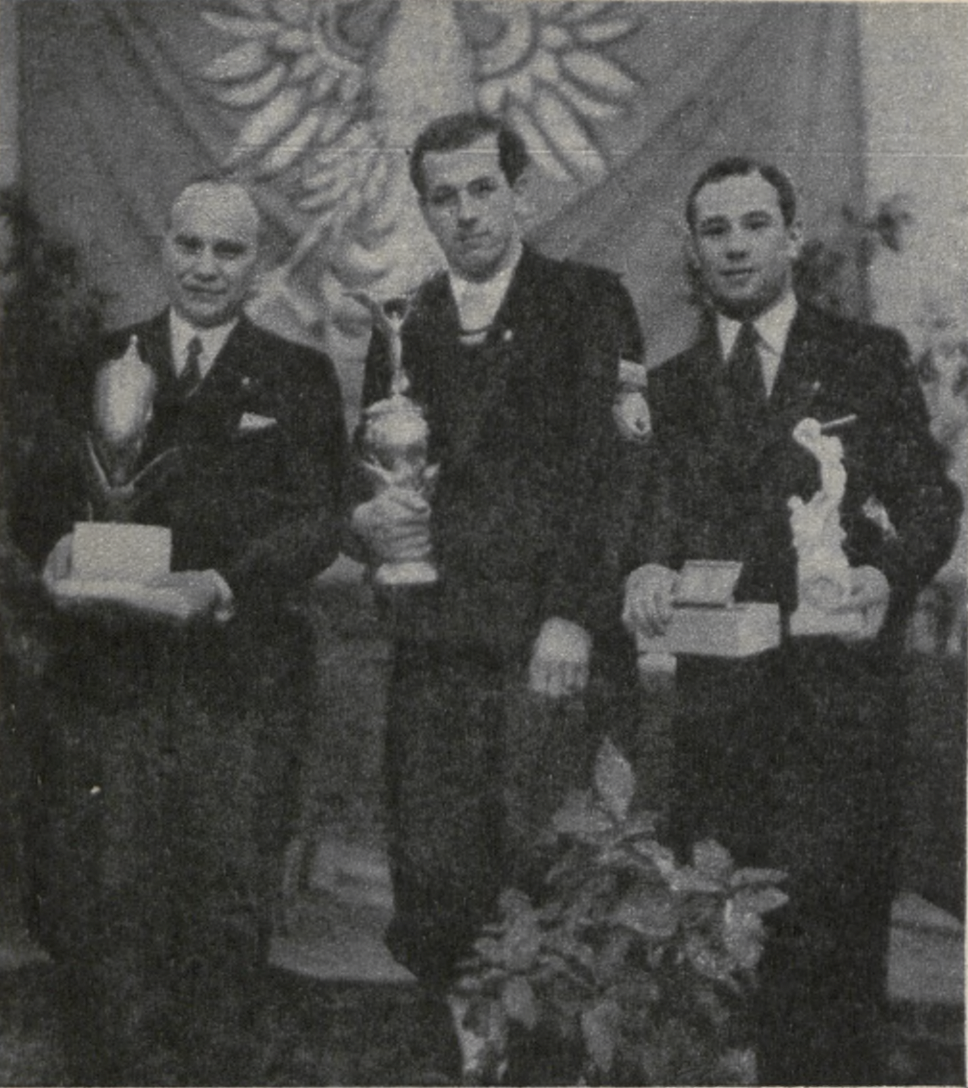
Bronisław Witkowski (left), Martin Tietze (center) and Maks Enker with their trophies at European Luge Championships 1935

Medal	Athlete	Time
Gold	Martin Tietze (GER)	
Silver	Maks Enker (POL)	
Bronze	Bronislaw Witkowski (POL)	

== Women's singles ==
Medal	Athlete	Time
Gold	Hanni Fink (TCH)	
Silver	Liselotte Hopfer (GER)	
Bronze	Gertrude Porsche-Schinkeová (TCH)	

== Men's doubles ==
Medal	Athlete	Time
Gold	Germany (Walter Feist, Walter Kluge)	
Silver	Germany (Martin Tietze, Kurt Weidner)	
Bronze	Czechoslovakia (Hans Taubner, Hans Schöler)	

== Medal table ==
Rank	Nation	Gold	Silver	Bronze	Total
1	Germany (GER)	2	2	0	4
2	Czechoslovakia (TCH)	1	0	2	3
3	Poland (POL)	0	1	1	2
Totals (3 entries)		3	3	3	9
