= Liselotte Hopfer =

German luger

Medal record

Luge

European Championships
| Silver medal – second place | 1935 Krynica | Women's singles |

Liselotte Hopfer is a German luger who competed during the mid-1930s. She won a silver medal in the women's singles event at the 1935 European luge championships in Krynica, Poland.
