= Schöler =

Surname list

Schöler, Schoeler may refer to:

- Christian Schoeler (born 1979), a German painter
- Diane Schöler-Rowe (1933–2023), an English-German table tennis player
- Eberhard Schöler (born 1940), a German table tennis player
- Gregor Schoeler (born 1944), a Swiss contemporary non-Muslim Islamic scholar
- Hans Schöler, a Czech Ethnic German luger
- Hans Robert Schöler (born 1953), a molecular biologist and stem cell researcher
