= Hans Taubner =

Czech luger

Medal record

Luge

European Championships
Bronze medal – third place	1935 Krynica	Men's doubles

Hans Taubner was an Ethnic German luger who competed for Czechoslovakia in the mid-1930s. He won a bronze medal in the men's doubles event at the 1935 European luge championships in Krynica, Poland.
