= Wojciech Bonowicz =

Poet, writer and journalist (born 1967)

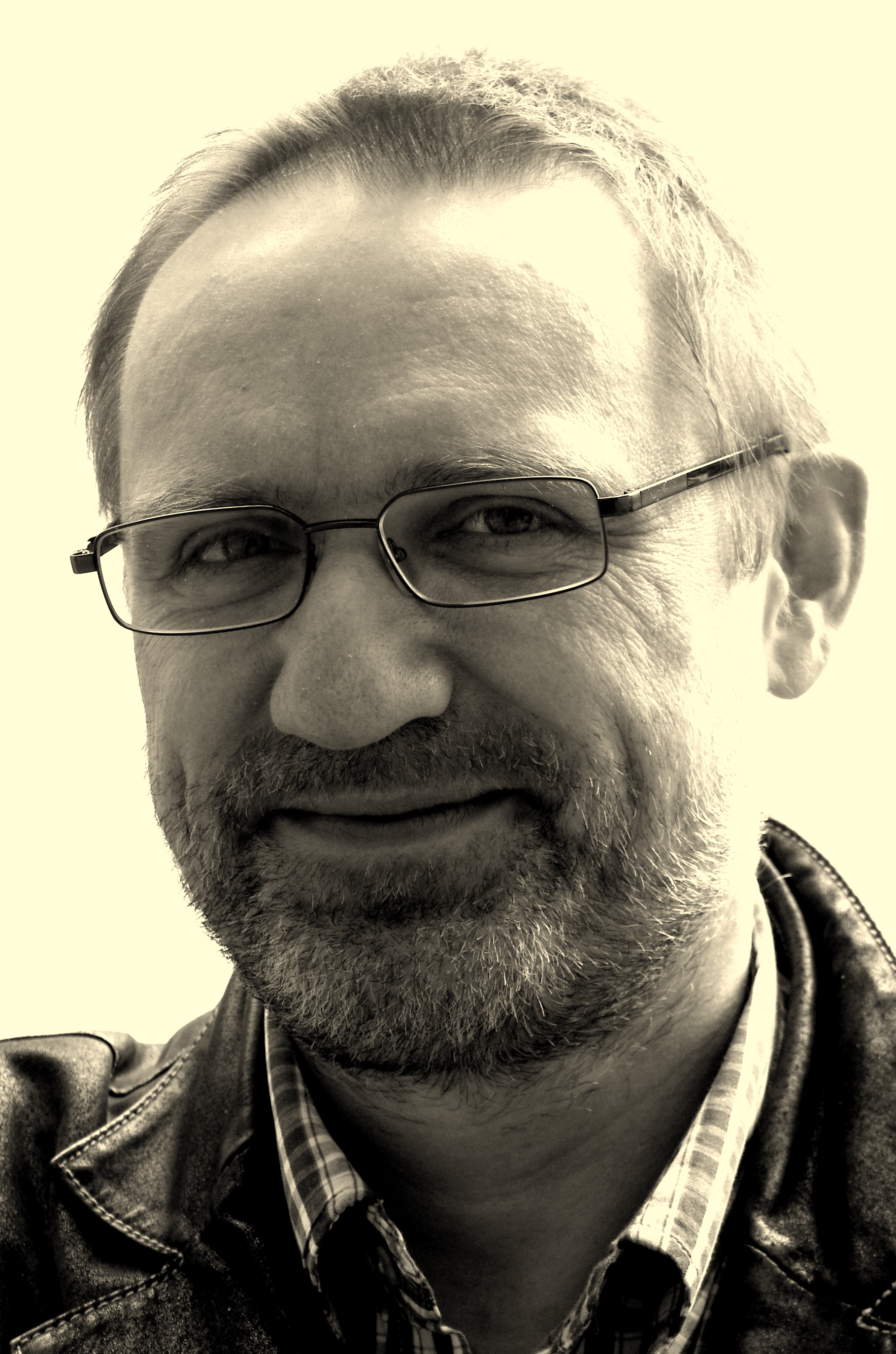
- Wojciech Bonowicz, 2013
- Born: 10 January 1967 (age 59); Oświęcim
- Education: Jagiellonian University
- Occupations: Poet, prose writer and journalist
- Awards: Gdynia Literary Prize (2007)

Wojciech Bonowicz (born 10 January 1967) is a poet, prose writer and journalist.

== Biography ==
He was born as the son of Franciszek Ciura and Zofia. He lived in Oświęcim until 1974 before moving to Kraków with his family where he attended the A. Witkowski High School (No. 5). He graduated in Polish studies from the Jagiellonian University. From 1994 he has been publishing poetry, prose and columns in Tygodnik Powszechny. In 1995, he started collaborating with the monthly Znak. He performed at the Talking Dog spoken magazine.

He married Diana in 1991. He has three children.

== Poetry books ==
Source.

- Wybór większości. Łódź: Stowarzyszenia Literackie im. K.K. Baczyńskiego. 1995.
- Hurtownia ran. Kraków: Zielona Sowa. 2000.
- Wiersze ludowe. Legnica: Biuro Literackie Port Legnica. 2001.
- Pełne morze. Wrocław: Biuro Literackie. 2006.
- Hurtownia ran i Wiersze ludowe. Wrocław: Biuro Literackie. 2007.
- Wybór większości i Wiersze z okolic. Wrocław: Biuro Literackie. 2007.
- Polskie znaki. Wrocław: Biuro Literackie. 2010.
- Echa. Wrocław: Biuro Literackie. 2013.
- Druga ręka. Kraków: Wydawnictwo a5. 2017.
- Wiersze wybrane. Kraków: Wydawnictwo a5. 2020.
- Wielkie rzeczy. Kraków: Wydawnictwo a5. 2022.

== Accolades ==
He was nominated to Nike Award four times. In 2007 he received Gdynia Literary Prize for Pełne morze.
