= Vitkauskas =

- Lithuanian surname
- m.: Vitkauskas
- f.: (unmarried): Vitkauskaitė
- f.: (married): Vitkauskienė
- Related names: Witkowski, Vitkovsky

Vitkauskas is a surname, a Lithuanized form of the Polish surname Witkowski. Notable people with the surname include:

- Armantas Vitkauskas (born 1989), Lithuanian footballer
- Julija Vitkauskienė, Lithuanian Righteous Among the Nations
- Justina Vitkauskaitė, Lithuanian politician, member of the Europarliament
- Vladas Vitkauskas (born 1953), Lithuanian mountain climber
- Vincas Vitkauskas (1890–1965), Lithuanian general
