= The Shepheardes Calender =

Work by Edmund Spenser

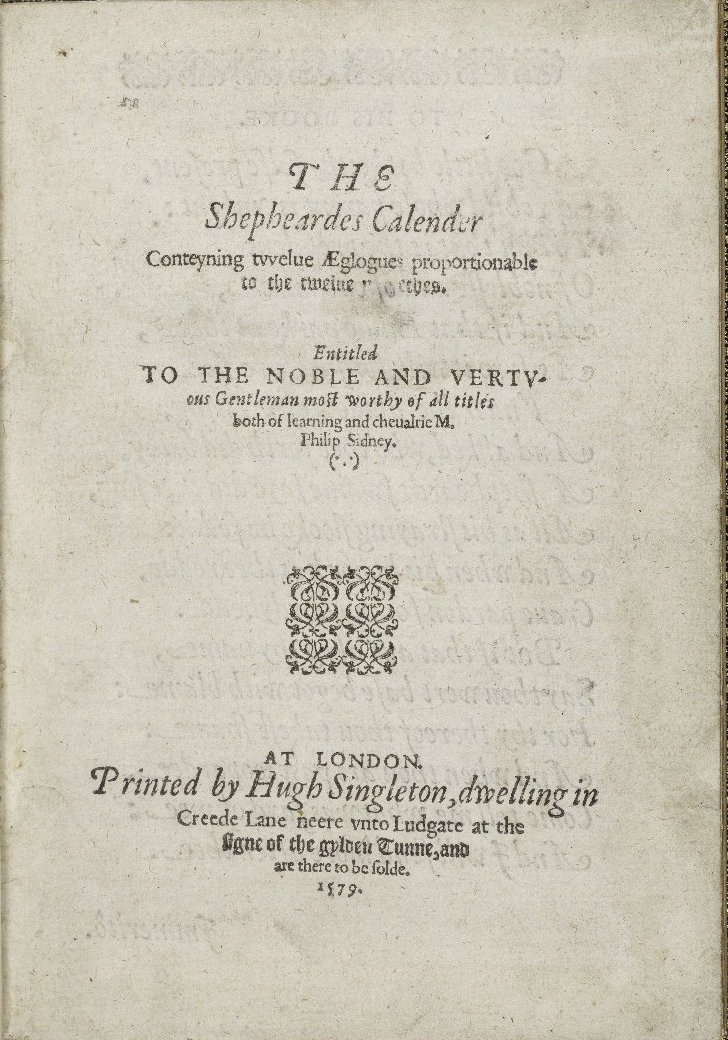
- Title page of The Shepheardes Calendar, circa 1579.
- Author: Edmund Spenser
- Language: Early Modern English
- Genre: Eclogue
- Publication date: 1579
- Publication place: Kingdom of England
- Text: The Shepheardes Calender at Wikisource

The Shepheardes Calender (originally titled The Shepheardes Calendar, Conteyning twelve Aeglogues proportionable to the Twelve monthes. Entitled to the Noble and Vertuous Gentleman most worthy of all titles both of learning and chevalrie M. Philip Sidney) was Edmund Spenser's first major poetic work, published in 1579. In emulation of Virgil's first work, the Eclogues, Spenser wrote this series of pastorals at the commencement of his career. However, Spenser's models were rather the Renaissance eclogues of Mantuanus. The title, like the entire work, is written using deliberately archaic spellings, in order to suggest a connection to medieval literature, and to Geoffrey Chaucer in particular. Spenser dedicated the poem to Philip Sidney. The poem introduces Colin Clout, a folk character originated by John Skelton, and depicts his life as a shepherd through the twelve months of the year. The Calender encompasses considerable formal innovations, anticipating the even more virtuosic Countess of Pembroke's Arcadia (The "Old" Arcadia, 1580), the classic pastoral romance by Sir Philip Sidney, with whom Spenser was acquainted. It is also remarkable for the extensive commentary or gloss included with the work in its first publication, ascribed to an "E.K." E.K. is an intelligent, very subtle, sometimes wrong, and often deeply ironic commentator, who is sometimes assumed to be an alias of Spenser himself. The term sarcasm (Sarcasmus) is first recorded in English in Spenser's poem (October).

== Interpretation ==
The twelve eclogues of The Shepheardes Calender, dealing with such themes as the abuses of the church, Colin's shattered love for Rosalind, praise for Queen Elizabeth, and encomia to the rustic Shepherd's life, are titled for the months of the year. Each eclogue is preceded by a woodcut and followed by a motto describing the speaker. The opening line of each eclogue expresses characteristics of the month, and the poem as a whole charts common accuracy of the seasons, the toil and celebrations of the village year. The precision of the description of birds, flowers, and harvests is balanced by an underlying theme of the hardships and rituals that each season entails. Each pastoral in the poem can be classified into one of three categories, identified as moral, plaintive, or re-creative.

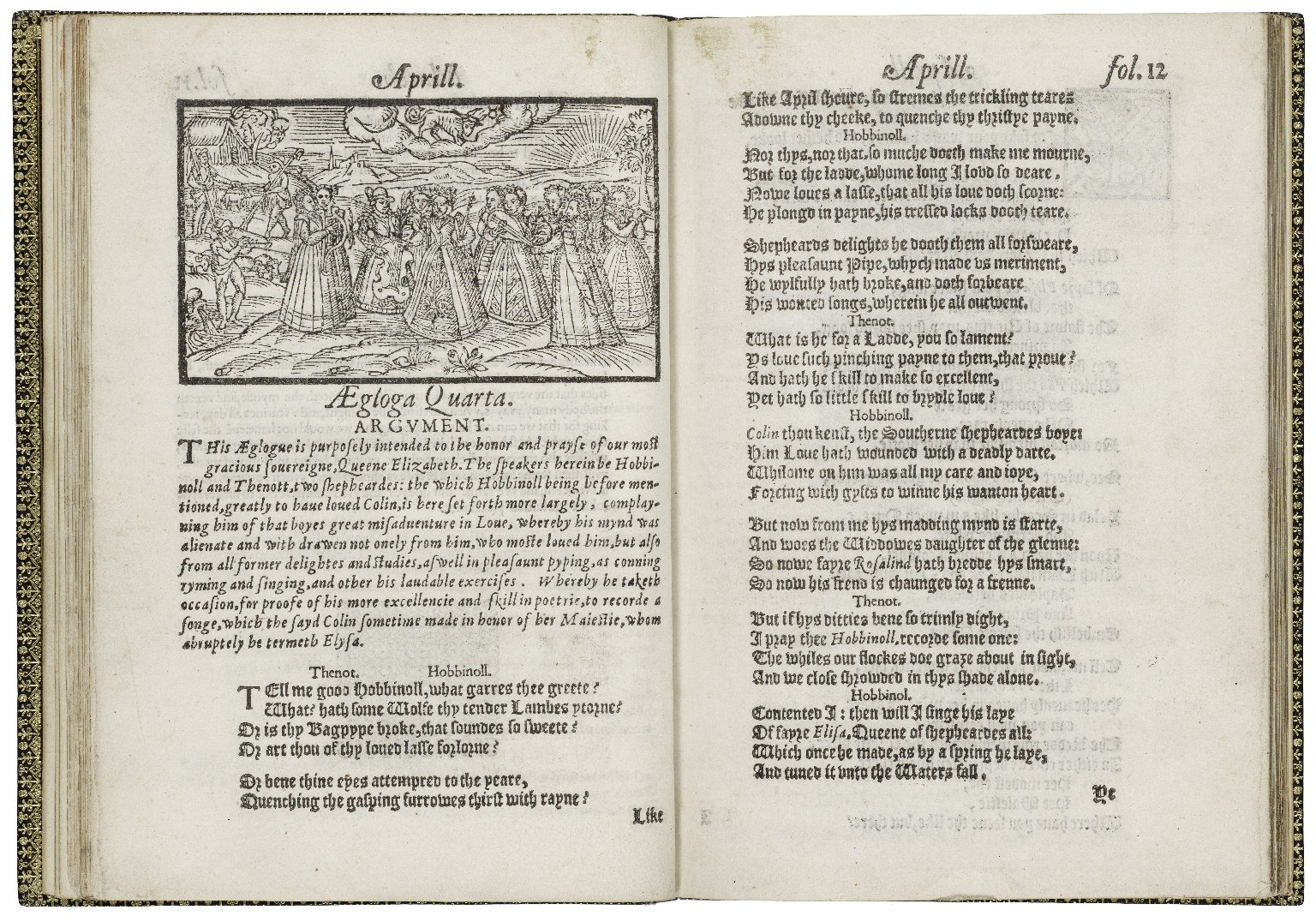
The first page of the Aprill Eclogue

The plaintive and re-creative poems are each devoted to presenting Colin Clout in his double character of lover and poet, whereas the moral poems are mixed with mocking bitterness, which moves Colin from a dramatic personae to a more homely style. While the January pastoral tells of the unhappy love of Colin for Rosalind, the springtime of April calls for a song in praise of Elizabeth. In May, the shepherds, who are rival pastors of the Reformation, end their sermons with an animal fable. In summer, they discourse on Puritan theology. October brings them to contemplate the trials and disappointments of a poet, and the series ends with a parable comparing life to the four seasons of the year.

== Form and style ==
The Shepheardes Calender is a poem that consists of twelve eclogues. Each eclogue is named after a different month, which represents the turning of seasons. An eclogue is a short pastoral poem that is in the form of a dialogue or soliloquy. This is why, while the months come together to form a whole year, each month can also stand alone as a separate poem. The months are all written in a different form. For example, April has a lyrical "laye" which honors the Queen. May gives off characterization and greater description. As the reader passes through each month and gets closer to the end of the year, the wording becomes less beautifully lyrical and more straightforward; closing together the poem the way the month of December closes up the year. Spenser uses rhyme differently in each month. There is a very cyclical pattern that shows off the kind of style that Spenser was going for, making the reader feel as though they are going through the cycle of each year just as the narrator does. The months all have repetition of elements and arguments. The style of the poem is also influenced by writers such as Chaucer and Skelton.

== Influence ==
Edmund Spenser's involvement with the Earl of Leicester set the groundwork for the influential effect that The Shepheardes Calender would have. A year after working together, the two of them, joined by Sir Philip Sidney, Edward Dyer, and Fulke Greville, created the literary group called "Areopagus". The group they formed supported Leicester's views on religion and politics (Bear).

Around the time The Shepheardes Calender was published in 1579, the Duc d'Alençon renewed his suit to marry the Queen – an alliance which Leicester, who personally opposed the match, reluctantly supported. Alençon was a Catholic, and many (possibly including Spenser) considered the marriage a danger to the Anglican Church. In Spenser's 'November' eclogue, the lament for Dido 'has been seen as a representation of the nation’s mourning for a queen who was in danger of dying to the faith'. Five months before The Shepheardes Calender, its publisher Hugh Singleton published The Discovery of a Gaping Gulf by John Stubbs, satirising Elizabeth's proposed marriage to the Duc d'Alençon. Stubbs had one of his hands cut off as a punishment for writing the text; Singleton narrowly escaped the same fate.

Spenser recognized that the poem was for his own financial and political gains, but it also sets the idea of standing behind one's work. The work was a success; between 1579 and 1597 five editions were published. One thing that separates the poem from others of its time is Spenser's use of allegory and his dependence on the idea of antiquity. The poem also set the groundwork for Spenser's best known work The Faerie Queene. The Shepheardes Calender was also crucial to the naturalization of the English language and the introduction of vocabulary along with literary techniques.

The Irish composer Ina Boyle first drafted her Colin Clout, "a pastoral for orchestra after the first aeglogue of Spenser's Shepheard's Calender", in 1921 and revised it in 1923.

== Translations ==
- Zhatkin, D. N. (ed.). Пастуший календарь [The Shepherd's Calendar]. Художественный перевод и сравнительное литературоведение. Сборник научных трудов [Artistic translation and comparative literature. Collection of scientific papers] (in Russian). Translated by Alexandrovsky, Sergei. Moscow: Nauka. Eclogues I–X : vol. IV, 2015; eclogues XI–XII: vol. V, 2016.
