= Georg Witkowski =

German historian (1863–1939)

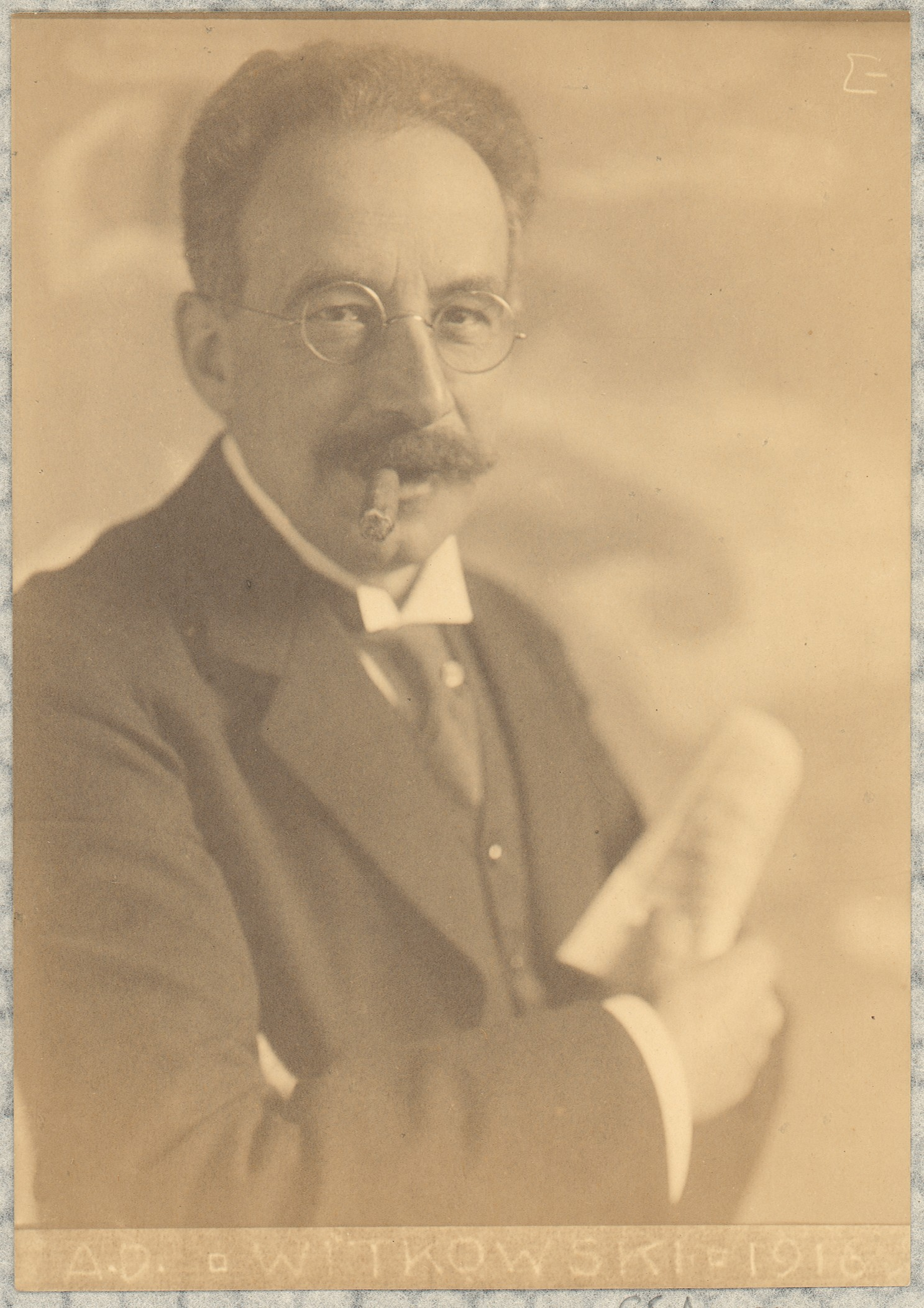
Photograph of Professor Georg Witkowski by Frank Eugene, at the Metropolitan Museum of Art

Georg Witkowski (11 September 1863, in Berlin – 11 September 1939, in Amsterdam) was a German literary historian.

== Literary works ==
- Die Handlung des zweiten Teils von Goethes Faust - Akademische Antrittsvorlesung, 1898, Dr. Seele & Co., Leipzig
- Goethe, 1899
- Das deutsche Drama des 19. Jahrhunderts, 1903
- Goethes Faust, 1906
- Die Entwicklung der deutschen Literatur seit 1830, 1911

== See also ==
- Witkowski
