= Maks Enker =

Polish luger

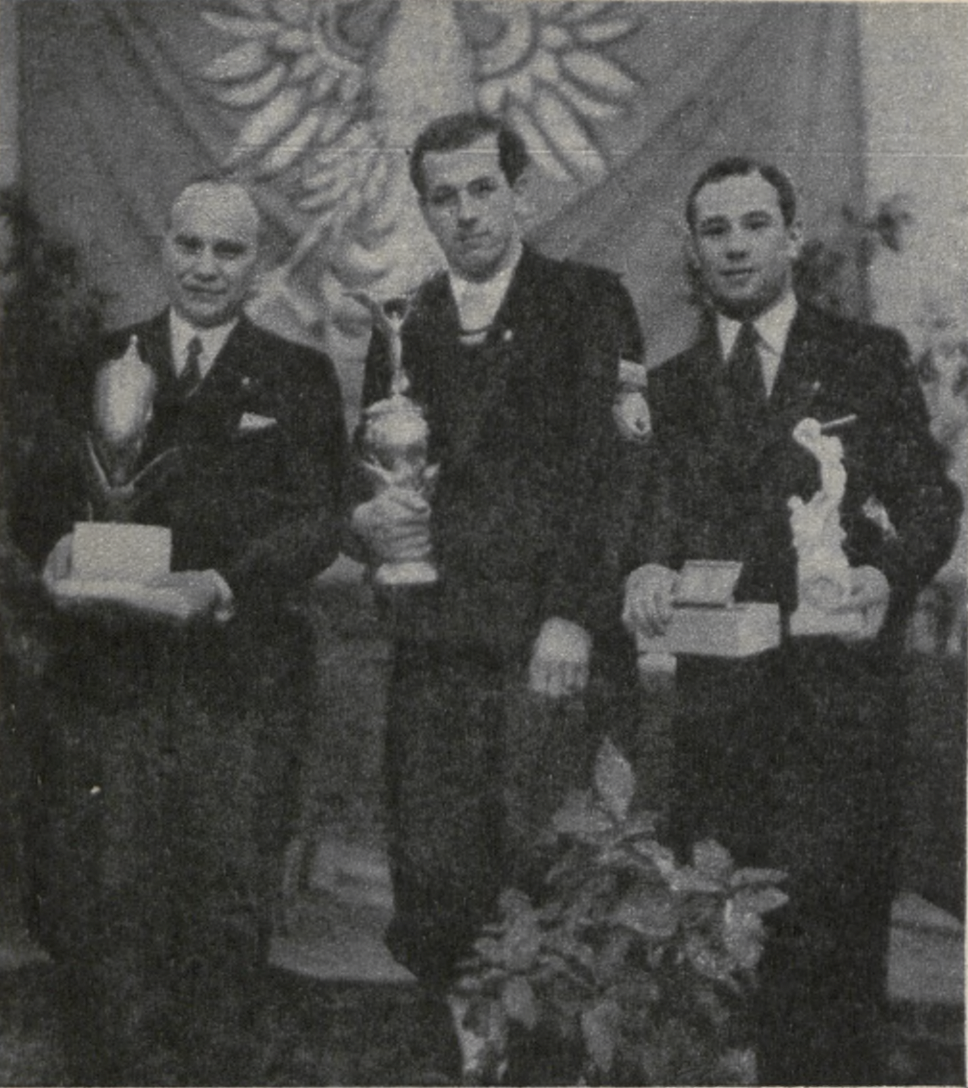

Maks Enker
Medal record

Luge

European Championships
Silver medal – second place	1935 Krynica	Men's singles

Maks Enker (sometimes shown as Max Enker) was a Polish luger who competed during the 1930s. He won the silver medal in the men's singles event at the 1935 European luge championships in Krynica, Poland and gold at the 1933 Maccabiah Games.
