= Sybille Witkowski =

German operatic soprano

Sybille Witkowski (born c. 1981 in Siegen) is a German operatic soprano.

== Life ==
Witkowski first studied clarinet. From 2002, at the age of 21, she began her singing stage, initially privately with Rosemarie Hagemann in Dortmund. From 2007, she studied singing at the Hochschule für Musik Nürnberg; there her teachers included Kammersänger Siegfried Jerusalem. Since 2008, Witkowski has been working on selected opera roles together with the opera singer Elizabeth Whitehouse.

Witkowski first began her training and singing career as a mezzo-soprano. She made her first stage appearances at the Kammeroper Köln and, while still in training, as Idamante in Idomeneo at the Hochschule für Musik Nürnberg. In the 2008/2009 season, Witkowski was a member of the International Opera Studio of the Staatstheater Nürnberg. Still a member of the opera studio, she first sang smaller opera roles at the Nuremberg State Theatre (including Lucienne in Die tote Stadt). She took on her first leading role, the role of the chansonette Sylva Varescu in the operetta Die Csárdásfürstin, at the Nuremberg State Theatre in the 2008/2009 season.

In the 2009/2010 and 2010/2011 seasons Witkowski was a permanent ensemble member of the Nuremberg State Theatre. She sang lyric soprano roles, but was also frequently used in operetta. At the Nuremberg State Theatre, Witkowski appeared in the following roles, among others: Countess in the marriage of Figaro, 1st Lady in The Magic Flute, Rosalinde in Die Fledermaus and Lisa in Das Land des Lächelns. In the 2011/2012 season, she continued to be engaged at the Staatstheater Nürnberg under a guest contract.

In the 2011/2012 season, Witkowski made a guest appearance at the Theater Heidelberg. She sang the title role of Frida Kahlo in the world premiere of the chamber opera Las Cartas de Frida Kahlo by Marcela Rodríguez. Witkowski also sang the title role in the operetta Die Csárdásfürstin at the Meininger Theater and the Landestheater Coburg in the meantime. In the 2012/2013 season, Witkowski made another guest appearance at the Staatstheater Nürnberg as Rosalinde in Die Fledermaus.

Since 2003, Witkowski has also performed as a concert singer, mainly in the field of oratorio and church music and with Lieder recitals. At the turn of the year 2008/2009, she was soloist in the New Year's Eve concert of the Staatskapelle Weimar.

As a Lieder singer, Witkowski appeared in September 2010 at the Nuremberg State Theatre with songs of Romantic music. In November 2011, she gave a guest performance at the Robert Schumann Society in Düsseldorf as part of the song recital "Töne sind höhere Worte". However, her song repertoire also includes Lieder of the turn of the century and of the modern era, by composers such as Gustav Mahler, Richard Strauss and Erich Wolfgang Korngold.
