= Bronisław Witkowski =

Polish luger (1899–1971)

Medal record

Luge

Representing Poland

European Championships
Bronze medal – third place	1935 Krynica	Men's singles

Bronisław Witkowski (27 August 1899 in Lviv – 15 October 1971 in Krynica-Zdrój) was a Polish luger who competed during the 1930s. He won the bronze medal in the men's singles event at the 1935 European luge championships in Krynica, Poland.
