= Mieczysław Szumiec =

Polish footballer

Personal information
- Date of birth: 24 March 1907
- Place of birth: Kraków, Austria-Hungary
- Date of death: 19 January 1993 (aged 85)
- Place of death: Kraków, Poland
- Height: 1.84 m (6 ft 0 in)
- Position: Goalkeeper

Senior career*
Years	Team	Apps	(Gls)
1923–1938	Cracovia		

International career
1926	Poland	1	(0)
- * Club domestic league appearances and goals

Mieczysław Szumiec (24 March 1907 – 19 January 1993) was a Polish footballer who played as a goalkeeper.

He earned one cap for the Poland national team in 1926.

== Honours ==
Cracovia

- Ekstraklasa: 1930, 1932
