= Tom Witkowski =

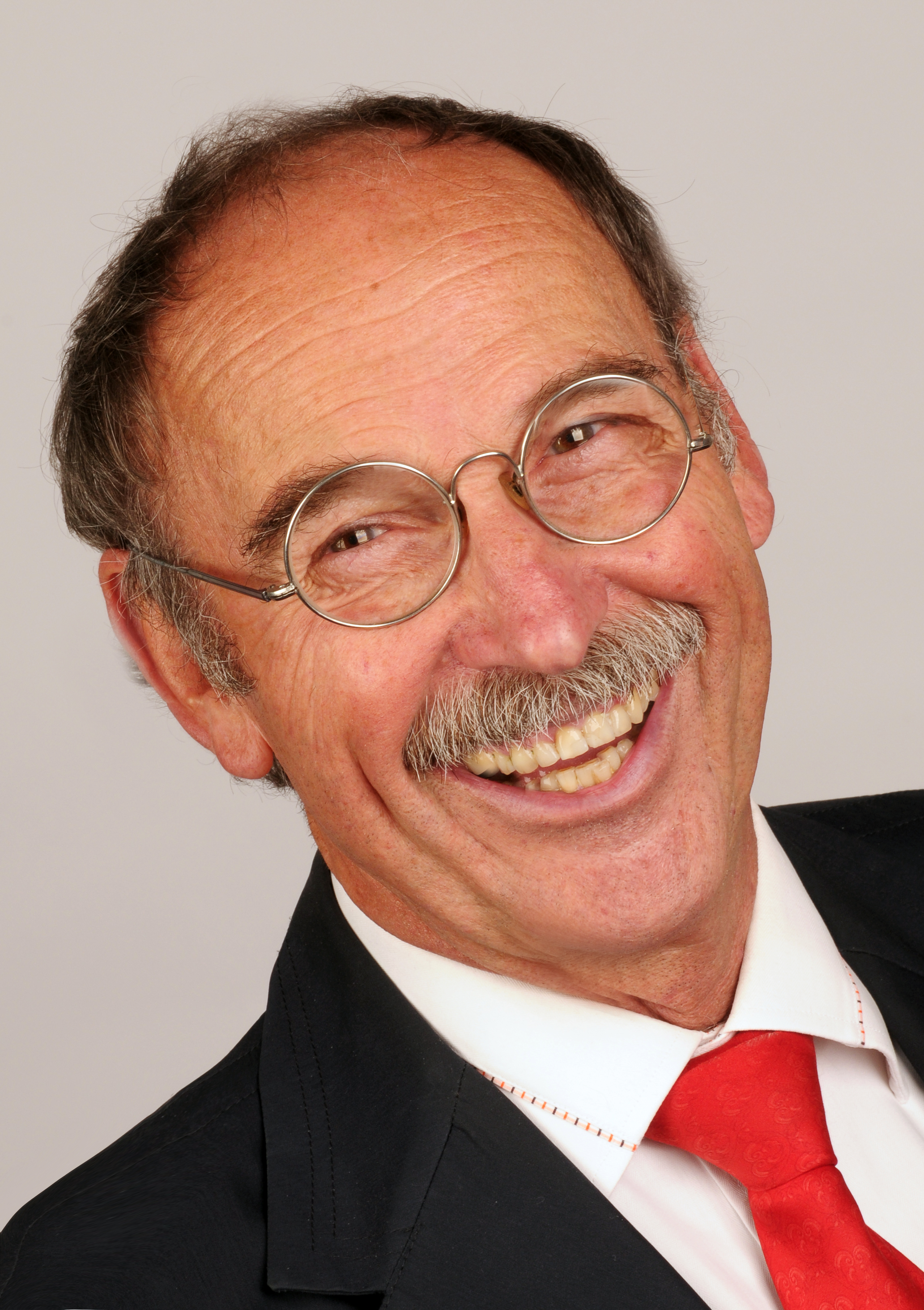
Tom Witkowski, 2014

Tom Witkowski (born Günter Klaus Witkowski, November 29, 1937) is a German theatre actor, theatre director, and lecturer.

In 1958 he co-founded Zimmertheater Tübingen.

From 1979 to 1985, he worked as an actor and director at Theater Aachen. He also worked in other theaters in Germany, in Düsseldorf, Krefeld, Mannheim, Oldenburg, and Essen. In 1996 he founded the Aachen Theater School. After a fall from a ladder he injured his spinal cord, resulted in a 15 year long hiatus in his career until 2002.

== Awards ==
- 2017: Grand Gold Decoration of Honour from the Guild of the German Stage (GDBA)
