= Academy of Learning =

Academy of Learning (Polish: Akademia Umiejętności; AU) was a primary Polish scientific institution during the annexation of Poland established in 1871. It was founded in Kraków as a continuation of the Kraków Scientific Society (Towarzystwo Naukowe Krakowskie). The institution began activity two years later, in 1873. At first, it focused on scholars from Kraków, however, it soon expanded its activity to Polish scholars from all annexed territories, along with Polish emigration. Its main goals were to organize, support and conduct learning, plus represent Polish scientists and scholars from all over the world.

AU changed its statute and in 1919 began activity as the Polish Academy of Learning (Polska Akademia Umiejętności; PAU) after Poland's independence was restored.
