= Konstanty Zakrzewski =

Polish physicist

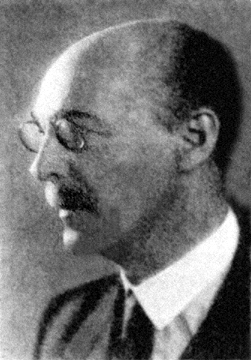
Konstanty Zakrzewski.

Konstanty Zakrzewski (14 January 1876 in Warsaw – 19 January 1948 in Kraków) was a Polish physicist. He was a professor of the Jagiellonian University (1911–1913 and since 1917) and professor of the Lviv University (1913–1917), member of the Polish Academy of Learning (since 1920).

Zakrzewski was a researcher of electron theory of metals, optics, and dielectric properties of substances. He was an initiator of cosmic ray research in Poland (1947).
