= Christian Schoeler =

German painter (1976–2015)

Christian Schoeler (October 26, 1976, in Hagen, Germany – December 28, 2015) was a German contemporary painter known for his watercolors and oil paintings, who lived and worked in Düsseldorf.

He studied at the Academy of Fine Arts, Munich, with Günther Förg, completing his studies in 2007. His work has been included in exhibitions in Cologne, Düsseldorf, London, Miami and Paris. Schoeler's work is often concerned with the ideas of fragility, beauty, vulnerability, as well as representations of youth and masculinity. "Seen up close, the rich rendering of the surfaces of his models' skin is second only to the rich surfaces of the paintings themselves. It’s hard not to get lost in what he describes as the boundary between what is on the inside and what is on the outside."

In 2009, Schoeler collaborated with Louis Vuitton’s Paul Helbers, designing a suit made entirely out of painted canvas for the Esquire (UK Edition) Singular Suit Project, which was then exhibited at Somerset House in London. This collaboration was followed by a second in January 2010 when he and Helbers created a series of hand-painted leather bags for Vuitton's fall/winter 2010/2011 men's wear collection.

His work has been featured in Dazed & Confused, AnOtherMan, OZON Magazine, Vogue Homme International, eastvillageboys.com, and The New York Times The Moment Blog.
