= Witkowski College =

Jagiellonian University in Poland

Coordinates: 50.0614°N 19.9331°E

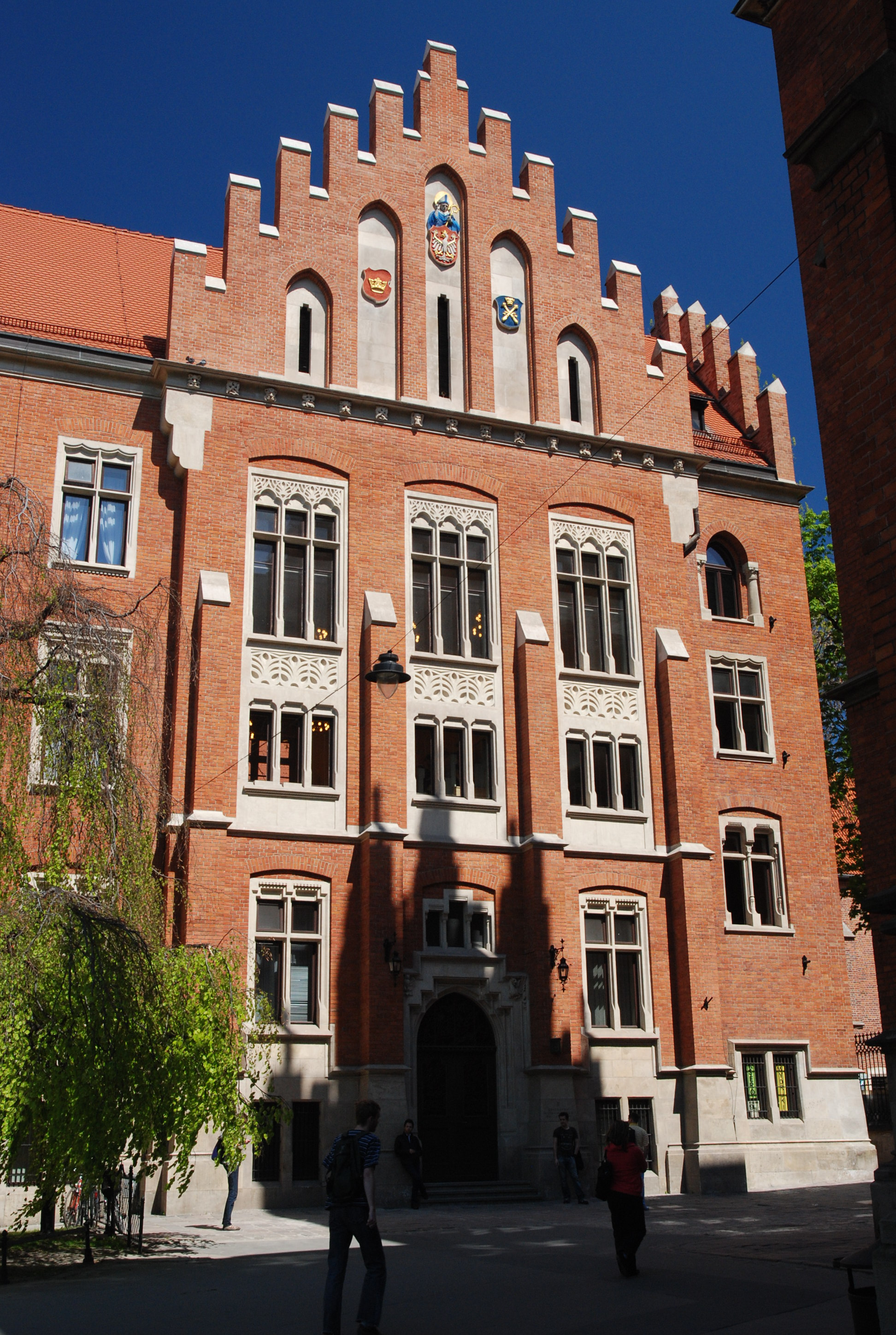
Collegium Witkowski

The Witkowski College (Polish: Collegium Witkowskiego), in Kraków, Poland, is a Jagiellonian University building erected in 1908–11. It stands at ulica Gołębia (Dove Street) 13 and was named for physicist and Jagiellonian University rector August Witkowski.

The building's style mixes elements of Gothic-revival, Romanesque-revival and Art Nouveau architecture.

Originally used by the physics department, it now serves the history department.
