= Yevgeny Vitkovsky =

Russian writer (1950–2020)

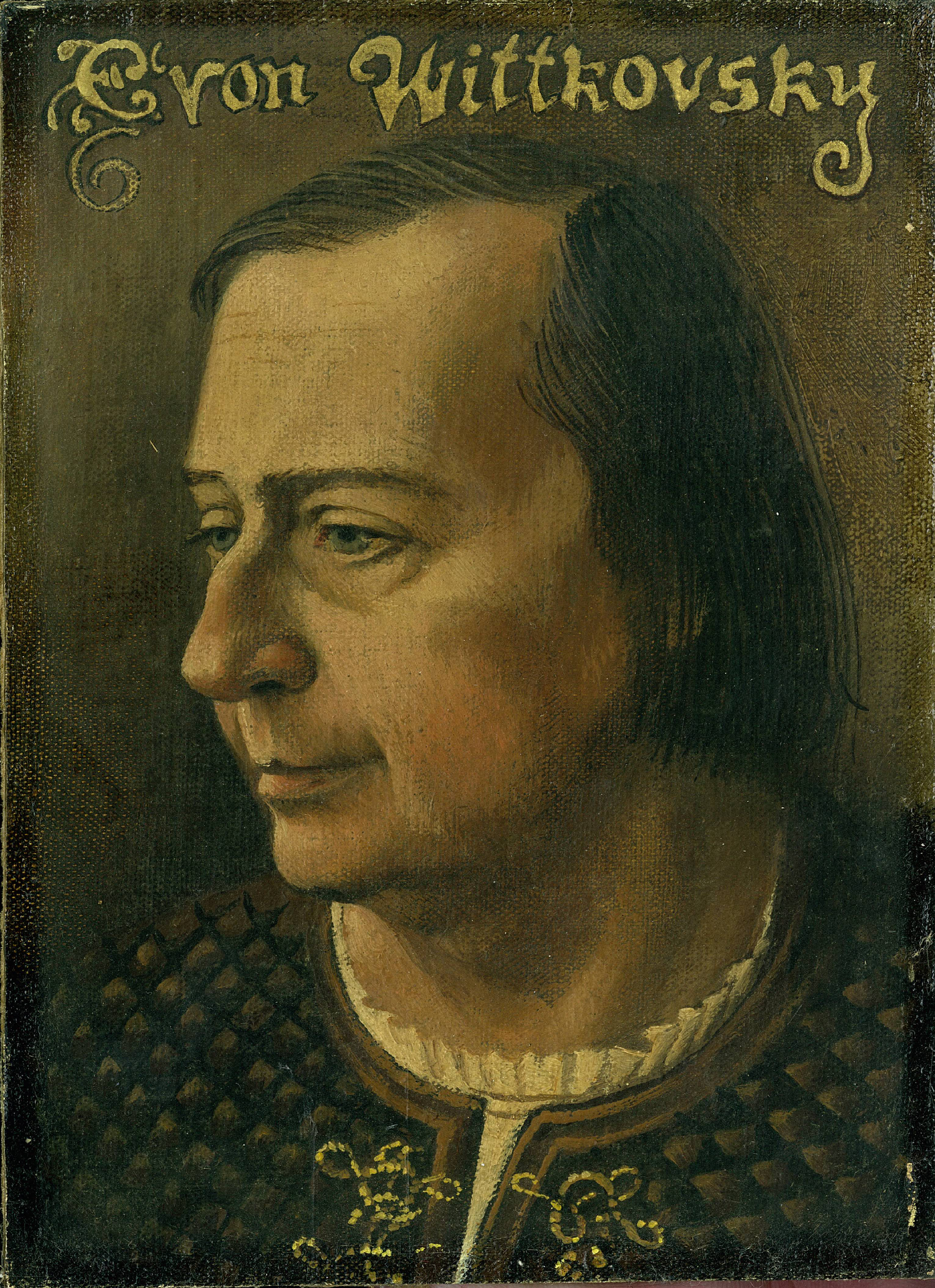
- Portrait by N. Verdi (1998)
- Born: June 18, 1950; Moscow, Russia
- Died: February 3, 2020 (aged 69); Moscow, Russia
- Occupations: Writer, poet, scholar, translator
- Writing career
- Period: 1969–2020
- Genres: Fiction, fantasy

Yevgeny Vitkovsky (Russian: Евге́ний Влади́мирович Витко́вский, romanized: Yevgeniy Vladimirovich Vitkovsky; June 18, 1950 – February 3, 2020) was a Russian fiction and fantasy writer, literary scholar, poet, and translator.

== Biography ==
Vitkovsky spent his childhood in Siberia, Central Asia, and Western Ukraine. From 1967–1971, he was a student of literary studies at Moscow State University, then took a leave of absence and never returned, becoming engaged in literature and dissident activities. Until censorship was lifted in USSR, Vitkovsky could only publish poetic translations; he translated and published numerous poems by John Milton, Christopher Smart, Robert Southey, John Keats, Oscar Wilde, Rudyard Kipling; by Scottish gaelic poets John Roy Stewart, Duncan Ban MacIntyre, Rob Donn, John MacLean (Bard MacLean), and by Luís Vaz de Camões, Fernando Pessoa, Rainer Maria Rilke, Joost van den Vondel, Arthur Rimbaud, Paul Valéry and others.

In the 1990s, he was mostly engaged in literary studies, compiling and editing a four-volume anthology of Russian poetry abroad "We lived on a different planet those days", a three-volume collected works of Georgy Ivanov, works of Ivan Yelagin, Arseny Nesmelov and others. His three-volume historical fantasy "Paul II" was published in 2000, its two sequels, "Saint Vitus Land" and "Chertovar" in 2001 and 2007 respectively. The latter two novels were selected for the short list of the Russian F&SF prize, the ABS Prize ("Arkady and Boris Strugatsky Prize").

In 2003, Vitkovsky founded website "Vek Perevoda" ("The Age of Translation", www.vekperevoda.com) with a web forum functioning as a school of poetic translation. In 2005 and 2006, Vodolei Publishers issued two anthologies of Russian poetic translation, based on the site's collections and edited by Vitkovsky; this edition will be continued.

In 2007, the same publisher printed an anthology "Seven Centuries of English Poetry" in three volumes (about 3000 pages), compiled by Vitkovsky and presenting for the first time in a single edition works by almost 500 English-language poets from 1300 to 2000 recreated by 134 translators since the 1800s. This anthology exceeds twentyfold any other previous Russian edition devoted to the poets of England, Scotland and Ireland.

== Works ==
=== Prose (novels) ===
- Павел II. Т. 1: Пронеси, Господи!; Т. 2: День пирайи; Т. 3: Пригоршня власти. — М.: АСТ; Харьков: Фолио, 2000.
- Земля святого Витта. — М.: АСТ; Харьков: Фолио, 2001. 2-е изд.: М.: Водолей Publishers, 2007.
- Чертовар. — М.: Водолей Publishers, 2007.
- Протей, или Византийский кризис. — М.: Престиж Бук, 2018. — 448 с. — (Серия «Коллекция»).
- Александрит, или Держава номер шесть. — М.: Престиж Бук, 2019. — 528 с. — (Серия «Коллекция»).
- Реквием Крысиному королю, или Гибель богов; Сказка про красного быка, или Хроники ленты Мёбиуса: Романы. — М.: Престиж Бук, 2020. — 608 с. — (Серия «Коллекция»).

=== Literary studies ===
- Из современной нидерландской поэзии. / Сост. Е. Витковский. — Москва, Прогресс, 1977, тир. 10 тыс.
- Из поэзии Нидерландов XVII века. / Сост. Е. Витковский. — Ленинград, 1983.
- Арсений Несмелов. Без Москвы, Без России. / Сост Е. Витковский, А. Ревоненко. — Москва, 1990.
- Георгий Иванов. Собрание сочинений в трёх томах. / Сост. Е. Витковский, В. Крейд. — Москва, 1994
- Мы жили тогда на планете другой: Антология поэзии русского зарубежья. 1920—1990 гг.. (Первая и вторая волна) (в четырёх томах). / Сост. Е. Витковский.— Москва, 1994—1997
- Иван Елагин. Собрание сочинений (в двух томах). / Сост. Е. Витковский.— Москва, 1998.
- Строфы века — 2: Антология русского поэтического перевода XX века. / Сост. Е. Витковский. — Москва, 1998.
- Семь веков французской поэзии: 1300—1999 гг.. / Сост. Е. Витковский. СПб, 1999.
- Фонетический шум (совм. с Л. Латыниным). — Москва, 2002.
- Александр Алон. Возвращая долги. Собрание стихотворений. / Сост. Е. Витковский. — Москва, 2005
- Роберт Саути. Баллады. / Сост. Е. Витковский.— Москва, 2006 (с парал. англ. текстом)
- Шарль Бодлер. Цветы зла. / Сост. Е. Витковский и В. Резвый. — Москва, 2006.(с парал. франц. текстом).
- Арсений Несмелов. Собрание сочинений (в двух томах). / Сост. Е. Витковский, А. Колесов, Ли Мэн, В. Резвый. Владивосток, 2006
- Александр Монтгомери. Вишня и тёрн. Сонеты. / Составитель и научный редактор Е. Витковский. — Москва, 2007
- Поль Валери. Полное собрание стихотворений. / Составитель и автор предисловия Е. Витковский. — Москва, 2007
- Семь веков английской поэзии: 3 т. / Составитель, автор предисловия Е. В. Витковский. Научный редактор В. Резвый. Предисловие Е. Витковского. Справки об авторах Е. Витковского, В. Вотрина, А. Прокопьева, В. Резвого, А. Серебренникова. Оформление и макет Марины и Леонида Орлушиных. — Москва: Водолей Publishers, 2007. Кн. 1: 1032 с. Кн. 2: 992 с. Кн. 3: 1008 с. — ISBN 978-5-902312-33-8
- Сара Тисдейл. Реки, текущие к морю: Избранные стихотворения. / Составитель, автор предисловия Е. Витковский. / Пер. с англ. — Москва: Водолей, 2011. — 192 с. — (Звёзды зарубежной поэзии). — ISBN 978-5-91763-062-5.
- Раздол туманов. Страницы шотландской гэльской поэзии XVII—XX в.в. Перевод Е. Витковского и Е. Кистеровой. Составитель, автор предисловия Е. Витковский. / Пер. с шотландского гэльского — Москва: Водолей, 2018. — 260 с. — (Звёзды зарубежной поэзии). — ISBN 978-5-91763-406-7
- Роберт Уильям Сервис. Зов Юкона. Составитель, автор предисловия Е. Витковский / Пер. с англ. — М.: Водолей, 2018. — 448 с. — ISBN 978-5-91763-409-8
- Франция в сердце : Поэзия Франции XII — начала XX вв. в переводах русских поэтов XVIII — начала XXI вв. Антология в 3 т. Составитель и автор предисловия Е. Витковский. Научный редактор А. Серебренников. Справки об авторах В. Ослон, А. Серебренников, Я. Старцев. — СПб. : Крига, 2019. — т. 1 760 с. т. 2 760 с. т. 3. 808 с. ISBN 978-5-98456-064-1

=== Poetic translations ===
- Uys Krige. Баллада о великом мужестве. A Ballad of a Great Courage. Transl. from Afrikaans М., 1977.
- Строфы о бессмертии. Страницы западногерманской поэзии. Stanzas on Immortality. From Western German poetry. Transl. from German. М., 1987
- Joost van den Vondel. Трагедии Tragedies. Transl. from Dutch. М., LP., 1988.
- Constantijn Huygens. Назидательные картинки Didactic Pictures. Transl. from Dutch. М, 2002.
- Theodor Kramer, Теодор Крамер.. Зелёный дом. / Перевод с немецкого. — М., 2012.
- Neil Gaiman, Нил Гейман. Черничная девочка. / Перевод с английского. — М., 2012.
- Вечный слушатель: Семь столетий поэзии в переводе Евгения Витковского. В 2 т. — М.: Водолей, 2013. — 656 + 688 с. ISBN 978-5-91763-082-3; 2-е издание:, Дюссельдорф, Za-Za, 2014—417+454 с. — ISBN 978-1-291-62469-4 + ISBN 978-1-291-67327-2
- Till Lindemann, Тилль Линдеманн: Нож. / Перевод с немецкого — М.:Бомбора, 2018. ISBN 978-5-04-090304-7
- Теодор Крамер. Хвала отчаянию. Избранные стихотворения. Перевод с немецкого. М.; «Водолей», 2019. — 300 с. ISBN 978-5-91763-486-9
