= Poland at the 1956 Winter Olympics =

- IOC code: POL
- NOC: Polish Olympic Committee
- Website: www.pkol.pl (in Polish)

in Cortina d'Ampezzo
- Competitors: 51 (44 men, 7 women) in 6 sports
- Flag bearer: Tadeusz Kwapień
- Medals Ranked 12th: Gold 0 Silver 0 Bronze 1 Total 1

Winter Olympics appearances (overview)
- 1924; 1928; 1932; 1936; 1948; 1952; 1956; 1960; 1964; 1968; 1972; 1976; 1980; 1984; 1988; 1992; 1994; 1998; 2002; 2006; 2010; 2014; 2018; 2022; 2026

Poland competed at the 1956 Winter Olympics in Cortina d'Ampezzo, Italy. Franciszek Gąsienica Groń won Poland's first ever medal at the Winter Olympic Games.

== Medalists ==
Medal	Name	Sport	Event	Date
Bronze	Franciszek Gąsienica Groń	Nordic combined	Men's individual	January 31

== Alpine skiing ==
Men

Athlete	Event	Race 1		Race 2		Total	
Athlete	Event	Time	Rank	Time	Rank	Time	Rank
Jan Zarycki	Downhill					DSQ	–
Andrzej Gąsienica Roj	Downhill					3:09.3	15
Andrzej Gąsienica Roj	Giant Slalom					3:48.6	54
Józef Marusarz	Giant Slalom					3:29.3	35
Włodzimierz Czarniak	Giant Slalom					3:24.2	28
Jan Zarycki	Giant Slalom					3:22.3	23
Jan Zarycki	Slalom	DSQ	–	–	–	DSQ	–
Andrzej Gąsienica Roj	Slalom	1:50.6	37	2:05.2	18	3:55.8	23
Jan Gąsienica Ciaptak	Slalom	1:33.8	17	2:06.2	20	3:40.0	16

Women

Athlete	Event	Race 1		Race 2		Total	
Athlete	Event	Time	Rank	Time	Rank	Time	Rank
Maria Gąsienica Daniel-Szatkowska	Downhill					DNF	–
Maria Kowalska	Downhill					1:51.9	19
Barbara Grocholska	Downhill					1:51.7	17
Maria Gąsienica Daniel-Szatkowska	Giant Slalom					2:10.9	35
Barbara Grocholska	Giant Slalom					2:05.5	30
Maria Kowalska	Giant Slalom					2:02.8	20
Maria Gąsienica Daniel-Szatkowska	Slalom	DSQ	–	–	–	DSQ	–
Maria Kowalska	Slalom	58.7	8	1:23.0	30	2:21.7	22

== Bobsleigh ==
Sled	Athletes	Event	Run 1		Run 2		Run 3		Run 4		Total	
Sled	Athletes	Event	Time	Rank	Time	Rank	Time	Rank	Time	Rank	Time	Rank
POL-1	Aleksy Konieczny; Zbigniew Skowroński	Two-man	1:27.21	16	1:27.23	21	1:27.87	20	1:28.54	18	5:50.85	19
POL-2	Stefan Ciapała; Aleksander Habala	Two-man	1:27.70	21	1:26.49	15	1:26.24	13	1:25.92	10	5:46.35	16

Sled	Athletes	Event	Run 1		Run 2		Run 3		Run 4		Total	
Sled	Athletes	Event	Time	Rank	Time	Rank	Time	Rank	Time	Rank	Time	Rank
POL-1	Stefan Ciapała; Jerzy Olesiak; Józef Szymański; Aleksander Habala	Four-man	1:19.95	12	1:20.25	14	1:21.10	14	1:22.19	19	5:23.49	15
POL-2	Aleksy Konieczny; Zygmunt Konieczny; Włodzimierz Źróbik; Zbigniew Skowroński (both participated... Jan Dąbrowski ...in two runs)	Four-man	n/a	n/a	n/a	n/a	n/a	n/a	n/a	n/a	5:28.40	21

== Cross-country skiing ==
Men

Event	Athlete	Race	
Event	Athlete	Time	Rank
15 km	Józef Gąsienica-Sobczak	56:39	44
15 km	Józef Rubiś	54:47	34
15 km	Andrzej Mateja	53:42	23
15 km	Tadeusz Kwapień	52:45	16
30 km	Stanisław Bukowski	1'56:26	29
30 km	Józef Rubiś	1'53:57	23
30 km	Tadeusz Kwapień	1'49:09	12
50 km	Stanisław Bukowski	3'10:49	13

Men's 4 × 10 km relay

Athletes	Race	
Athletes	Time	Rank
Józef Rubiś; Józef Gąsienica-Sobczak; Tadeusz Kwapień; Andrzej Mateja	2'25:55	9

Women

Event	Athlete	Race	
Event	Athlete	Time	Rank
10 km	Helena Gąsienica Daniel	43:09	24
10 km	Zofia Krzeptowska	41:37	18
10 km	Józefa Czerniawska-Pęksa	41:28	17
10 km	Maria Gąsienica Bukowa-Kowalska	41:09	16

Women's 3 x 5 km relay

Athletes	Race	
Athletes	Time	Rank
Maria Gąsienica Bukowa-Kowalska; Józefa Czerniawska-Pęksa; Zofia Krzeptowska	1'13:20	5

== Ice hockey ==
=== Group B ===
Top two teams advanced to Medal Round.

Rank	Team	Pld	W	L	T	GF	GA	Pts
1	Czechoslovakia	2	2	0	0	12	6	4
2	United States	2	1	1	0	7	4	2
3	Poland	2	0	2	0	3	12	0

- USA 4-0 Poland
- Czechoslovakia 8-3 Poland

=== Games for 7th-10th places ===
Rank	Team	Pld	W	L	T	GF	GA	Pts
7	Italy	3	3	0	0	21	7	6
8	Poland	3	2	1	0	12	10	4
9	Switzerland	3	1	2	0	12	18	2
10	Austria	3	0	3	0	9	19	0

- Poland 6-2 Switzerland
- Poland 4-3 Austria
- Italy 5-2 Poland

Contestants; Władysław Pabisz; Edward Kocząb; Janusz Zawadzki; Kazimierz Chodakowski; Stanisław Olczyk; Mieczysław Chmura; Henryk Bromowicz; Józef Kurek; Zdzisław Nowak; Szymon Janiczko; Adolf Wróbel; Kazimierz Bryniarski; Marian Herda; Hilary Skarżyński; Bronisław Gosztyła; Rudolf Czech; Alfred Wróbel

== Nordic combined ==
Events:

- normal hill ski jumping (Three jumps, best two counted and shown here.)
- 15 km cross-country skiing

Athlete	Event	Ski Jumping				Cross-country			Total	
Athlete	Event	Distance 1	Distance 2	Points	Rank	Time	Points	Rank	Points	Rank
Józef Daniel Krzeptowski	Individual	62.0	60.5	173.5	33	1'00:48	222.600	18	396.100	29
Jan Raszka	Individual	65.0	64.5	182.5	29	1'05:15	205.400	32	387.900	32
Franciszek Gąsienica Groń	Individual	72.5	71.5	203.0	10	57:55	233.800	7	436.800	3rd place, bronze medalist(s)
Aleksander Kowalski	Individual	74.0	75.0	210.5	5	1'03:37	211.700	29	422.200	15

== Ski jumping ==
Athlete	Event	Jump 1			Jump 2			Total	
Athlete	Event	Distance	Points	Rank	Distance	Points	Rank	Points	Rank
Józef Huczek	Normal hill	70.5	95.5	28	67.0	89.5	36	185.0	30
Władysław Tajner	Normal hill	74.0	98.0	26	76.5	103.0	12	201.0	16
Roman Gąsienica Sieczka	Normal hill	77.5	101.5	21	71.5	88.0	40	189.5	25
Andrzej Gąsienica Daniel	Normal hill	78.0	102.0	18	74.5	96.5	22	198.5	20
