= Bobsleigh at the 1956 Winter Olympics =

Bobsleigh at the VII Olympic Winter Games
- Venue: Cortina d'Ampezzo, Italy
- Dates: 27 January – 4 February 1956
- Competitors: 101 from 14 nations

At the 1956 Winter Olympics, two bobsleigh events were contested.

== Medal summary ==
Event	Gold	Silver	Bronze
Two-man	Italy; Italy I Lamberto Dalla Costa; Giacomo Conti	Italy; Italy II; Eugenio Monti; Renzo Alverà	Switzerland; Switzerland I Max Angst; Harry Warburton
Four-man	Switzerland; Switzerland I Franz Kapus; Gottfried Diener; Robert Alt; Heinrich Angst	Italy; Italy II; Eugenio Monti; Ulrico Girardi; Renzo Alverà; Renato Mocellini	United States; USA I Arthur Tyler; William Dodge; Charles Thomas Butler; James Lamy

== Participating nations ==
- Austria (9)
- Belgium (2)
- France (6)
- United Team of Germany (10)
- Great Britain (9)
- Italy (10)
- Liechtenstein (2)
- Norway (5)
- Poland (9)
- Romania (8)
- Spain (4)
- Sweden (9)
- Switzerland (8)
- United States (11)

== Medal table ==
Rank	Nation	Gold	Silver	Bronze	Total
1	Italy	1	2	0	3
2	Switzerland	1	0	1	2
3	United States	0	0	1	1
Totals (3 entries)		2	2	2	6
