= Bobsleigh at the 1956 Winter Olympics – Four-man =

The four-man bobsleigh results at the 1956 Winter Olympics in Cortina d'Ampezzo, Italy. The competition was held on Friday and Saturday, 3 and 4 February 1956.

== Medallists ==
Gold	Silver	Bronze
Switzerland; Switzerland I Franz Kapus; Gottfried Diener; Robert Alt; Heinrich Angst	Italy; Italy II; Eugenio Monti; Ulrico Girardi; Renzo Alverà; Renato Mocellini	United States; USA I Arthur Tyler; William Dodge; Charles Butler; James Lamy

== Results ==
Rank	Team	Athletes	Run 1	Run 2	Run 3	Run 4	Final
Gold	Switzerland Switzerland I	Franz Kapus, Gottfried Diener, Robert Alt, & Heinrich Angst	1:18.00	1:17.19	1:17.09	1:18.16	5:10.44
Silver	Italy Italy II	Eugenio Monti, Ulrico Girardi, Renzo Alverà, & Renato Mocellini	1:17.69	1:17.97	1:18.13	1:18.31	5:12.10
Bronze	United States USA I	Arthur Tyler, William Dodge, Charles Butler, & James Lamy	1:17.75	1:17.87	1:18.25	1:18.52	5:12.39
4	Switzerland Switzerland II	Max Angst, Aby Gartmann, Harry Warburton, & Rolf Gerber	1:17.41	1:17.85	1:18.68	1:20.33	5:14.27
5	Italy Italy I	Dino De Martin, Giovanni De Martin, Giovanni Tabacchi, & Carlo Da Prà	1:18.10	1:18.65	1:18.50	1:19.41	5:14.66
6	United Team of Germany Germany I	Hans Rösch, Michael Pössinger, Lorenz Nieberl, & Sylvester Wackerle	1:18.61	1:19.04	1:19.43	1:20.94	5:18.02
7	Austria Austria II	Kurt Loserth, Wilfried Thurner, Karl Schwarzböck, & Frank Dominik	1:19.37	1:19.12	1:20.08	1:19.72	5:18.29
8	United Team of Germany Germany II	Franz Schelle, Jakob Nirschl, Hans Henn, & Edmund Koller	1:19.03	1:18.84	1:19.31	1:21.35	5:18.50
9	Spain Spain I	Alfonso de Portago, Vicente Sartorius y Cabeza de Vaca, Gonzalo Taboada, & Luis Muñoz	1:18.87	1:19.27	1:21.37	1:19.08	5:19.49
10	Austria Austria I	Karl Wagner, Fritz Rursch, Adolf Tonn, & Heinrich Isser	1:19.60	1:20.74	1:19.98	1:20.30	5:20.62
11	Norway Norway I	Arne Røgden, Arnold Dyrdahl, Odd Solli, & Trygve Brudevold	1:20.96	1:20.08	1:20.45	1:20.01	5:21.50
12	Great Britain Great Britain I	Keith Schellenberg, Rollo Brandt, Ralph Raffles, & John Rainforth	1:21.39	1:18.73	1:20.42	1:21.58	5:22.12
13	Sweden Sweden II	Kjell Holmström, Sven Erbs, Walter Aronson, & Jan Lapidoth	1:20.58	1:20.32	1:21.15	1:21.13	5:23.18
14	Romania Romania I	Heinrich Enea, Dumitru Peteu, Nicolae Moiceanu, & Mărgărit Blăgescu	1:21.53	1:20.58	1:20.64	1:20.44	5:23.19
15	Poland Poland I	Stefan Ciapała, Jerzy Olesiak, Józef Szymański, & Aleksander Habala	1:19.95	1:20.25	1:21.10	1:22.19	5:23.49
16	Sweden Sweden I	Olle Axelsson, Ebbe Wallén, Sune Skagerling, & Gunnar Åhs	1:18.95	1:19.98	1:22.75	1:21.86	5:23.54
17	Great Britain Great Britain II	Stuart Parkinson, John Read, Christopher Williams, & Rodney Mann	1:20.72	1:19.92	1:22.51	1:20.58	5:23.73
18	France France I	André Robin, Pierre Bouvier, Jacques Panciroli, & Lucien Grosso	1:20.00	1:21.25	1:20.95	1:21.63	5:23.83
19	United States USA II	James Bickford, Donald Jacques, Lawrence McKillip, & Hubert Miller	1:20.97	1:22.47	1:21.22	1:20.50	5:25.16
20	Romania Romania II	Constantin Dragomir, Vasile Panait, Ion Staicu, & Gheorghe Moldoveanu	1:21.21	1:21.22	1:22.37	1:23.03	5:27.83
21	Poland Poland II	Aleksy Konieczny, Zygmunt Konieczny, Włodzimierz Źróbik, & Zbigniew Skowroński/Jan Dombrowski(*)					5:28.40

(*) NOTE: Jan Dąbrowski replaced Zbigniew Skowroński after two runs.
