= Poland at the 1952 Winter Olympics =

- IOC code: POL
- NOC: Polish Olympic Committee
- Website: www.pkol.pl (in Polish)

in Oslo
- Competitors: 30 (27 men, 3 women) in 4 sports
- Flag bearer: Stanisław Marusarz
- Medals: Gold 0 Silver 0 Bronze 0 Total 0

Winter Olympics appearances (overview)
- 1924; 1928; 1932; 1936; 1948; 1952; 1956; 1960; 1964; 1968; 1972; 1976; 1980; 1984; 1988; 1992; 1994; 1998; 2002; 2006; 2010; 2014; 2018; 2022; 2026

Poland competed at the 1952 Winter Olympics in Oslo, Norway.

== Alpine skiing ==
Men

| Athlete | Event | Race 1 | | Race 2 | | Total | |
| Athlete | Event | Time | Rank | Time | Rank | Time | Rank |
|---|---|---|---|---|---|---|---|
| Józef Marusarz | Downhill | | | | | 2:58.7 | 43 |
| Andrzej Czarniak | Downhill | | | | | 2:56.4 | 42 |
| Stefan Dziedzic | Downhill | | | | | 2:49.4 | 29 |
| Andrzej Gąsienica Roj | Downhill | | | | | 2:44.3 | 22 |
| Józef Marusarz | Giant Slalom | | | | | 2:55.5 | 48 |
| Andrzej Gąsienica Roj | Giant Slalom | | | | | 2:52.2 | 41 |
| Jan Płonka | Giant Slalom | | | | | 2:51.5 | 39 |
| Stefan Dziedzic | Giant Slalom | | | | | 2:50.3 | 38 |
| Stefan Dziedzic | Slalom | 1:25.1 | 71 | did not advance | | | |
| Jan Płonka | Slalom | 1:16.6 | 57 | did not advance | | | |
| Andrzej Gąsienica Roj | Slalom | 1:06.1 | 28 Q | 1:23.5 | 28 | 2:29.6 | 28 |
| Jan Gąsienica Ciaptak | Slalom | 1:05.2 | 26 Q | DSQ | – | DSQ | – |

Women

| Athlete | Event | Race 1 | | Race 2 | | Total | |
| Athlete | Event | Time | Rank | Time | Rank | Time | Rank |
|---|---|---|---|---|---|---|---|
| Teresa Kodelska | Downhill | | | | | DSQ | – |
| Maria Kowalska | Downhill | | | | | 2:27.4 | 34 |
| Barbara Grocholska | Downhill | | | | | 1:54.1 | 13 |
| Maria Kowalska | Giant Slalom | | | | | DSQ | – |
| Barbara Grocholska | Giant Slalom | | | | | DSQ | – |
| Teresa Kodelska | Giant Slalom | | | | | 2:32.6 | 34 |
| Maria Kowalska | Slalom | 1:30.1 | 36 | 1:25.5 | 36 | 2:55.6 | 34 |
| Teresa Kodelska | Slalom | 1:14.7 | 25 | 1:19.0 | 35 | 2:33.7 | 32 |
| Barbara Grocholska | Slalom | 1:10.2 | 16 | 1:10.1 | 18 | 2:20.3 | 14 |

== Cross-country skiing ==
Men

| Event | Athlete | Race | |
| Event | Athlete | Time | Rank |
|---|---|---|---|
| 18 km | Taduesz Kwapień | 1'11:40 | 41 |

== Ice hockey ==
The tournament was run in a round-robin format with nine teams participating.

| Team | Pld | W | L | T | GF | GA | Pts |
|---|---|---|---|---|---|---|---|
| Canada | 8 | 7 | 0 | 1 | 71 | 14 | 15 |
| United States | 8 | 6 | 1 | 1 | 43 | 21 | 13 |
| Sweden | 9 | 7 | 2 | 0 | 53 | 22 | 14 |
| Czechoslovakia | 9 | 6 | 3 | 0 | 50 | 23 | 12 |
| Switzerland | 8 | 4 | 4 | 0 | 40 | 40 | 8 |
| Poland 6th | 8 | 2 | 5 | 1 | 21 | 56 | 5 |
| Finland | 8 | 2 | 6 | 0 | 21 | 60 | 4 |
| West Germany | 8 | 1 | 6 | 1 | 21 | 53 | 3 |
| Norway | 8 | 0 | 8 | 0 | 15 | 46 | 0 |

- Czechoslovakia 8-2 Poland
- Sweden 17-1 Poland
- Switzerland 6-3 Poland
- Canada 11-0 Poland
- Poland 4-4 Germany FR
- USA 5-3 Poland
- Poland 4-2 Finland
- Norway 3-4 Poland

Contestants

- Michał Antuszewicz
- Henryk Bromowicz
- Kazimierz Chodakowski
- Stefan Csorich
- Rudolf Czech
- Alfred Gansiniec
- Jan Hampel
- Marian Jeżak
- Eugeniusz Lewacki
- Roman Penczek
- Hilary Skarżyński
- Tadeusz Świcarz
- Stanisław Szlendak
- Zdzisław Trojanowski
- Antoni Wróbel
- Alfred Wróbel

== Ski jumping ==
| Athlete | Event | Jump 1 | | | Jump 2 | | | Total | |
| Athlete | Event | Distance | Points | Rank | Distance | Points | Rank | Points | Rank |
|---|---|---|---|---|---|---|---|---|---|
| Leopold Tajner | Normal hill | 57.0 | 88.0 | 39 | 56.5 | 90.0 | 38 | 178.0 | 39 |
| Stanisław Marusarz | Normal hill | 59.0 | 93.0 | 35 | 60.5 | 96.0 | 24 | 189.0 | 27 |
| Jakub Węgrzynkiewicz | Normal hill | 60.5 | 94.0 | 33 | 58.5 | 91.0 | 35 | 185.0 | 33 |
| Antoni Wieczorek | Normal hill | 60.5 | 96.5 | 24 | 60.5 | 94.5 | 25 | 191.0 | 24 |
