= Romania at the 1956 Winter Olympics =

- IOC code: ROU
- NOC: Romanian Olympic and Sports Committee
- Website: www.cosr.ro (in Romanian, English, and French)

in Cortina d'Ampezzo
- Competitors: 19 (13 men, 6 women) in 4 sports
- Medals: Gold 0 Silver 0 Bronze 0 Total 0

Winter Olympics appearances (overview)
- 1928; 1932; 1936; 1948; 1952; 1956; 1960; 1964; 1968; 1972; 1976; 1980; 1984; 1988; 1992; 1994; 1998; 2002; 2006; 2010; 2014; 2018; 2022; 2026

Romania competed at the 1956 Winter Olympics in Cortina d'Ampezzo, Italy.

== Alpine skiing ==
Men

Athlete	Event	Race 1		Race 2		Total	
Athlete	Event	Time	Rank	Time	Rank	Time	Rank
Gheorghe Cristoloveanu	Downhill					DSQ	–
Nicolae Pandrea	Downhill					3:46.5	31
Nicolae Pandrea	Giant Slalom					4:12.3	74
Gheorghe Cristoloveanu	Giant Slalom					3:30.5	37
Gheorghe Cristoloveanu	Slalom	2:05.6	46	2:15.4	28	4:21.0	39
Nicolae Pandrea	Slalom	1:52.9	40	2:26.2 (+0:05)	38	4:19.1	39

Women

Athlete	Event	Race 1		Race 2		Total	
Athlete	Event	Time	Rank	Time	Rank	Time	Rank
Elena Epuran	Downhill					2:27.7	44
Magdalena Marotineanu	Downhill					2:04.0	40
Elena Epuran	Giant Slalom					3:20.5	43
Magdalena Marotineanu	Giant Slalom					2:21.0	39
Elena Epuran	Slalom	DSQ	–	–	–	DSQ	–
Magdalena Marotineanu	Slalom	DSQ	–	–	–	DSQ	–

== Bobsleigh ==
Sled	Athletes	Event	Run 1		Run 2		Run 3		Run 4		Total	
Sled	Athletes	Event	Time	Rank	Time	Rank	Time	Rank	Time	Rank	Time	Rank
ROU-1	Heinrich Ene; Mărgărit Blăgescu	Two-man	1:26.51	13	1:26.83	17	1:26.44	14	1:26.44	16	5:46.22	14
ROU-2	Constantin Dragomir; Gheorghe Moldoveanu	Two-man	1:27.22	17	1:26.42	14	1:27.57	19	1:28.95	20	5:50.16	18

Sled	Athletes	Event	Run 1		Run 2		Run 3		Run 4		Total	
Sled	Athletes	Event	Time	Rank	Time	Rank	Time	Rank	Time	Rank	Time	Rank
ROU-1	Heinrich Ene; Dumitru Peteu; Nicolae Moiceanu; Mărgărit Blăgescu	Four-man	1:21.53	21	1:20.58	16	1:20.64	12	1:20.44	10	5:23.19	14
ROU-2	Constantin Dragomir; Vasile Panait; Ion Staicu; Gheorghe Moldoveanu	Four-man	1:21.21	19	1:21.22	18	1:22.37	18	1:23.03	21	5:27.83	20

== Cross-country skiing ==
Men

Event	Athlete	Race	
Event	Athlete	Time	Rank
15 km	Constantin Enache	56:06	40
15 km	Manole Aldescu	54:40	32
30 km	Constantin Enache	1'59:52	36
30 km	Manole Aldescu	1'57:42	31

Women

Event	Athlete	Race	
Event	Athlete	Time	Rank
10 km	Margareta Arvay	DSQ	–
10 km	Ștefania Botcariu	49:37	39
10 km	Iuliana Simon	49:32	38

Women's 3 x 5 km relay

Athletes	Race	
Athletes	Time	Rank
Ștefania Botcariu; Elena Zangor; Iuliana Simon	DSQ	–

== Ski jumping ==
Athlete	Event	Jump 1			Jump 2			Total	
Athlete	Event	Distance	Points	Rank	Distance	Points	Rank	Points	Rank
Nicolae Munteanu	Normal hill	66.0	85.0	44	70.0	90.0	34	175.0	42
