= Switzerland at the 1956 Winter Olympics =

- IOC code: SUI (SVI used at these Games)
- NOC: Swiss Olympic Association
- Website: www.swissolympic.ch (in German and French)

in Cortina d'Ampezzo
- Competitors: 59 (51 men, 8 women) in 7 sports
- Flag bearer: Georges Schneider
- Medals Ranked 4th: Gold 3 Silver 2 Bronze 1 Total 6

Winter Olympics appearances (overview)
- 1924; 1928; 1932; 1936; 1948; 1952; 1956; 1960; 1964; 1968; 1972; 1976; 1980; 1984; 1988; 1992; 1994; 1998; 2002; 2006; 2010; 2014; 2018; 2022; 2026

Switzerland competed at the 1956 Winter Olympics in Cortina d'Ampezzo, Italy.

== Medalists ==
Medal	Name	Sport	Event
Gold	Madeleine Berthod	Alpine skiing	Women's downhill
Gold	Renée Colliard	Alpine skiing	Women's slalom
Gold	Franz Kapus; Gottfried Diener; Robert Alt; Heinrich Angst	Bobsleigh	Four-man
Silver	Raymond Fellay	Alpine skiing	Men's downhill
Silver	Frieda Dänzer	Alpine skiing	Women's downhill
Bronze	Max Angst; Harry Warburton	Bobsleigh	Two-man

== Alpine skiing ==
Men

Athlete	Event	Race 1		Race 2		Total	
Athlete	Event	Time	Rank	Time	Rank	Time	Rank
Andreas Ruedi	Downhill					DSQ	–
Hans Forrer	Downhill					3:08.0	13
Roger Staub	Downhill					2:57.1	4
Raymond Fellay	Downhill					2:55.7	2nd place, silver medalist(s)
Raymond Fellay	Giant Slalom					3:23.9	27
Martin Julen	Giant Slalom					3:18.5	19
Roland Blaesi	Giant Slalom					3:18.2	18
Georges Schneider	Giant Slalom					3:17.3	17
Martin Julen	Slalom	DSQ	–	–	–	DSQ	–
René Rey	Slalom	1:34.1	19	1:53.6	4	3:27.7	10
Raymond Fellay	Slalom	1:32.8	13	1:59.3	12	3:32.1	11
Georges Schneider	Slalom	1:29.0	4	1:53.6	4	3:22.6	5

Women

Athlete	Event	Race 1		Race 2		Total	
Athlete	Event	Time	Rank	Time	Rank	Time	Rank
Hedi Beeler	Downhill					1:54.0	25
Rosemarie Reichenbach	Downhill					1:51.6	15
Frieda Dänzer	Downhill					1:45.4	2nd place, silver medalist(s)
Madeleine Berthod	Downhill					1:40.7	1st place, gold medalist(s)
Hedi Beeler	Giant Slalom					DSQ	–
Annemarie Waser	Giant Slalom					2:02.3	14
Frieda Dänzer	Giant Slalom					2:00.9	11
Madeleine Berthod	Giant Slalom					1:58.3	4
Madeleine Berthod	Slalom	1:09.7 (+0:05)	26	58.7	4	2:08.3	17
Hedi Beeler	Slalom	1:01.9	20	1:03.2	18	2:05.1	15
Freida Dänzer	Slalom	59.2	12	59.7	9	1:58.9	10
Renée Colliard	Slalom	55.6	1	56.7	1	1:52.3	1st place, gold medalist(s)

== Bobsleigh ==
Sled	Athletes	Event	Run 1		Run 2		Run 3		Run 4		Total	
Sled	Athletes	Event	Time	Rank	Time	Rank	Time	Rank	Time	Rank	Time	Rank
SUI-1	Max Angst; Harry Warburton	Two-man	1:24.71	5	1:23.81	5	1:24.27	4	1:24.67	4	5:37.46	3rd place, bronze medalist(s)
SUI-2	Franz Kapus; Heinrich Angst	Two-man	1:24.74	6	1:24.50	8	1:24.70	6	1:26.17	13	5:40.11	7

Sled	Athletes	Event	Run 1		Run 2		Run 3		Run 4		Total	
Sled	Athletes	Event	Time	Rank	Time	Rank	Time	Rank	Time	Rank	Time	Rank
SUI-1	Franz Kapus; Gottfried Diener; Robert Alt; Heinrich Angst	Four-man	1:18.00	4	1:17.19	1	1:17.09	1	1:18.16	1	5:10.44	1st place, gold medalist(s)
SUI-2	Max Angst; Aby Gartmann; Harry Warburton; Rolf Gerber	Four-man	1:17.41	1	1:17.85	2	1:18.68	5	1:20.33	9	5:14.27	4

== Cross-country skiing ==
Men

Event	Athlete	Race	
Event	Athlete	Time	Rank
15 km	Erwin Hari	55:06	38
15 km	Michel Rey	55:05	36
15 km	Victor Kronig	54:43	33
15 km	Werner Zwingli	53:40	20
30 km	Armand Genoud	2'01:05	41
30 km	André Huguenin	1'58:40	34
30 km	Fritz Kocher	1'55:18	27
30 km	Marcel Huguenin	1'54:36	25
50 km	André Huguenin	3'31:04	27
50 km	Alfred Kronig	3'23:21	24
50 km	Fritz Zurbuchen	3'19:42	19
50 km	Christian Wenger	3'17:49	18

Men's 4 × 10 km relay

Athletes	Race	
Athletes	Time	Rank
Werner Zwingli; Victor Kronig; Fritz Kocher; Marcel Huguenin	2'24:30	7

== Figure skating ==
Men

Athlete	CF	FS	Points	Places	Rank
Hans Müller	12	12	135.28	112	12
François Pache	11	10	139.39	95	11

Women

Athlete	CF	FS	Points	Places	Rank
Alice Fischer	18	20	137.69	203	18
Karin Borner	15	16	141.69	171	16

== Ice hockey ==
=== Group C ===
Top two teams advanced to Medal Round.

Rank	Team	Pld	W	L	T	GF	GA	Pts
1	Soviet Union	2	2	0	0	15	4	4
2	Sweden	2	1	1	0	7	10	2
3	Switzerland	2	0	2	0	8	16	0

- Sweden 6-5 Switzerland
- USSR 10-3 Switzerland

=== Games for 7th-10th places ===
Rank	Team	Pld	W	L	T	GF	GA	Pts
7	Italy	3	3	0	0	21	7	6
8	Poland	3	2	1	0	12	10	4
9	Switzerland	3	1	2	0	12	18	2
10	Austria	3	0	3	0	9	19	0

- Switzerland 7-4 Austria
- Poland 6-2 Switzerland
- Italy 8-3 Switzerland

Contestants; Christian Conrad; Martin Riesen; Kurt Peter; Georg Riesch; Émile Golaz; Rudolf Keller; Sepp Weingärtner; Paul Hofer; Hans Ott; Franz Berry; Hans Pappa; Fritz Naef; Emil Handschin; Bernhard Bagnoud; Walter Keller; Rätus Frei; Otto Schläpfer

== Ski jumping ==
Athlete	Event	Jump 1			Jump 2			Total	
Athlete	Event	Distance	Points	Rank	Distance	Points	Rank	Points	Rank
Francis Perret	Normal hill	66.0	86.0	42	64.0	82.5	45	168.5	45
Conrad Rochat	Normal hill	68.5	89.5	40	68.5	87.5	41	177.0	40
Andreas Däscher	Normal hill	82.0	108.0	6	82.0	111.5	2	219.5	6

== Speed skating ==
Men

Event	Athlete	Race	
Event	Athlete	Time	Rank
500 m	Erich Kull	44.3	40
1500 m	Erich Kull	2:21.7	46
1500 m	Jürg Rohrbach	2:21.7	46
5000 m	Jürg Rohrbach	8:39.5	39
