= Bobsleigh at the 1956 Winter Olympics – Two-man =

The two-man bobsleigh results at the 1956 Winter Olympics in Cortina d'Ampezzo. The competition was held on Friday and Saturday, 27 and 28 January 1956.

== Medallists ==
Gold	Silver	Bronze
Italy; Italy I Lamberto Dalla Costa; Giacomo Conti	Italy; Italy II; Eugenio Monti; Renzo Alverà	Switzerland; Switzerland I Max Angst; Harry Warburton

== Results ==
Rank	Team	Athletes	Run 1	Run 2	Run 3	Run 4	Final
Gold	Italy Italy I	Lamberto Dalla Costa & Giacomo Conti	1:22.00	1:22.45	1:22.95	1:22.74	5:30.14
Silver	Italy Italy II	Eugenio Monti & Renzo Alverà	1:22.73	1:22.53	1:23.37	1:22.82	5:31.45
Bronze	Switzerland Switzerland I	Max Angst & Harry Warburton	1:24.71	1:23.81	1:24.27	1:24.67	5:37.46
4	Spain Spain II	Alfonso de Portago & Vicente Sartorius y Cabeza de Vaca	1:24.81	1:23.77	1:24.03	1:24.99	5:37.60
5	United States USA I	Waightman Washbond & Piet Biesiadecki	1:24.82	1:24.15	1:24.78	1:24.41	5:38.16
6	United States USA II	Arthur Tyler & Edgar Seymour	1:25.41	1:23.77	1:24.44	1:26.46	5:40.08
7	Switzerland Switzerland II	Franz Kapus & Heinrich Angst	1:24.74	1:24.50	1:24.70	1:26.17	5:40.11
8	United Team of Germany Germany II	Andreas Ostler & Hans Hohenester	1:24.63	1:24.89	1:25.07	1:25.54	5:41.34
9	United Team of Germany Germany I	Hans Rösch & Lorenz Nieberl	1:26.92	1:24.08	1:25.21	1:25.13	5:41.34
10	Great Britain Great Britain II	Stuart Parkinson & Christopher Williams	1:25.63	1:24.53	1:26.73	1:25.94	5:42.83
11	Great Britain Great Britain I	Clifford Schellenberg & John Rainforth	1:24.52	1:26.57	1:25.88	1:26.39	5:43.36
12	Austria Austria I	Paul Aste & Heinrich Isser	1:26.32	1:25.82	1:26.61	1:25.22	5:43.97
13	Belgium Belgium I	Marcel Leclef & Albert Casteleyns	1:27.30	1:25.93	1:25.60	1:25.98	5:44.81
14	Romania Romania I	Heinrich Enea & Mărgărit Blăgescu	1:26.51	1:26.83	1:26.44	1:26.44	5:46.22
15	Austria Austria II	Karl Wagner & Adolf Tonn	1:26.15	1:27.06	1:26.73	1:26.35	5:46.29
16	Poland Poland II	Stefan Ciapała & Aleksander Habala	1:27.70	1:26.49	1:26.24	1:25.92	5:46.35
17	Sweden Sweden I	Olle Axelsson & Tryggve Sundström	1:27.15	1:27.82	1:26.01	1:25.67	5:46.65
18	Romania Romania II	Constantin Dragomir & Gheorghe Moldoveanu	1:27.22	1:26.42	1:27.57	1:28.95	5:50.16
19	Poland Poland I	Aleksy Konieczny & Zbigniew Skowroński	1:27.21	1:27.23	1:27.87	1:28.54	5:50.85
20	Norway Norway II	Arne Røgden & Odd Solli	1:27.57	1:26.90	1:28.81	1:29.05	5:52.33
–	Norway Norway I	Reidar Alveberg & Arnold Dyrdahl					DNF
–	Sweden Sweden II	Sven Erbs & Walter Aronson					DNF
–	France France I	André Robin & Lucien Grosso					DNF
–	France France II	André Donnet & Serge Giacchini					DNF
–	Liechtenstein Liechtenstein I	Moritz Heidegger & Weltin Wolfinger					DNF
