= Deaths in July 2003 =

The following is a list of notable deaths in July 2003.

Entries for each day are listed alphabetically by surname. A typical entry lists information in the following sequence:

- Name, age, country of citizenship at birth, subsequent country of citizenship (if applicable), reason for notability, cause of death (if known), and reference.

== July 2003 ==
=== 1 ===
- Berta Ambrož, 58, Yugoslav and Slovene singer.
- John Bissell Carroll, 87, American psychologist.
- Hossein Fekri, 79, Iranian football player and coach.
- Élie Fruchart, 80, French footballer and manager.
- Chicho Sánchez Ferlosio, 63, Spanish singer-songwriter.
- Herbie Mann, 73, American crossover jazz and bossa nova flutist, prostate cancer.
- Bill Miller, 75, American baseball player (New York Yankees, Baltimore Orioles).
- Khieu Ponnary, 83, Cambodian communist and wife of Khmer Rouge leader Pol Pot, cancer.
- George Roper, 69, English comedian, cancer.

=== 2 ===
- Ivan Allen, Jr., 92, American businessman and 52nd mayor of Atlanta.
- Briggs Cunningham, 96, American entrepreneur and sportsman, Alzheimer's disease.
- Franklin Farrel, 95, American ice hockey player and Olympian (1932).
- Antonio Fortich, 89, Filipino Roman Catholic bishop and social activist.
- Mario Giannelli, 82, American football player (Boston College Eagles, Philadelphia Eagles).
- Najeeb Halaby, 87, American businessman, aviator, and father of Queen Noor of Jordan.
- Erkki Mallenius, 75, Finnish amateur boxer and Olympic medalist (1952).
- James Saxon, 48, English television and theatre actor, heart attack.

=== 3 ===
- Gaetano Alibrandi, 89, Italian papal diplomat and Apostolic Nuncio to Ireland.
- Johannes Andenæs, 90, Norwegian jurist and professor.
- Hendrik van der Linde, 71, South African Olympic boxer (1952).
- Vince Lloyd, 96, American radio announcer, stomach cancer.
- Jack B. Olson, 82, American businessman, diplomat, and politician.
- Skip Scarborough, 58, American songwriter, cancer.
- Yuri Shchekochikhin, 53, Soviet and Russian investigative journalist, writer, and politician, poisoned.
- Anne Barbara Underhill, 83, Canadian astrophysicist.
- C. C. Wang, 96, Chinese-American artist and art collector.

=== 4 ===
- Manuel Araneta, Jr., 76, Filipino basketball player and Olympian (1948).
- Larry Burkett, 64, American radio personality, heart failure.
- Anthony J. Celebrezze Jr., 61, American politician, heart attack.
- André Claveau, 87, French singer.
- Gusztáv Kettesi, 74, Hungarian Olympic swimmer (1952).
- Tyler McVey, 91, American actor, leukemia.
- Armin Mohler, 83, Swiss far-right political philosopher and journalist.
- Gunnar Petersson, 87, Swedish Olympic javelin thrower (1948).
- Tomris Uyar, 62, Turkish writer and translator.
- Barry White, 58, American smooth soul singer ("Can't Get Enough of Your Love, Babe"), renal failure.

=== 5 ===
- Zhang Aiping, 93, Chinese military leader, defense minister under Deng Xiaoping.
- Fernando Arbex, 62, Spanish musician and songwriter.
- Jacques Crétaine, 86, French Olympic decathlete (1948).
- Norbert Dietrich, 72, German Olympic gymnast (1952).
- Prodan Gardzhev, 67, Bulgarian middleweight freestyle wrestler and Olympic champion (1960, 1964, 1968), heart attack.
- Roman Lyashenko, 24, Russian ice hockey player (Dallas Stars, New York Rangers), suicide by hanging.
- Nǃxau, 58, Namibian actor and bush farmer (The Gods Must Be Crazy), tuberculosis.
- Princess Isabelle, 91, French noble and widow of Henri, Count of Paris, pretender to the French throne.
- Nadav Safran, 77, American academic and expert in Arab and Middle East politics, cancer.
- Yoshio Sakurauchi, 91, Japanese politician.
- Hedy Schlunegger, 80, Swiss alpine skier and Olympic champion (1948).
- Abrie Schutte, 66, South African Olympic boxer (1960).
- Sulaiman Ninam Shah, 83, Malaysian businessman and politician.
- Bebu Silvetti, 59, Argentine musician, songwriter and arranger, respiratory failure.

=== 6 ===
- Skip Battin, 69, American bass guitarist, singer and songwriter (The Byrds, the Flying Burrito Brothers), Alzheimer's disease.
- Willie Buchan, 88, Scottish football player and manager.
- Ed Chandler, 86, American baseball player (Brooklyn Dodgers).
- Buddy Ebsen, 95, American actor (The Beverly Hillbillies, Barnaby Jones, Breakfast at Tiffany's), pneumonia.
- Ignacio Antonio Velasco García, 74, Venezuelan Roman Catholic cardinal.
- Çelik Gülersoy, 72, Turkish lawyer, writer and poet, pancreatic cancer.
- Andrew Heiskell, 87, American journalist and chairman and CEO of Time Inc.
- Antal Kotász, 73, Hungarian football player.
- Kathleen Raine, 95, British poet and literary critic.
- Spec Sanders, 84, American football player (University of Texas, New York Yankees, New York Yanks).

=== 7 ===
- Raphael I Bidawid, 81, Iraqi Patriarch of the Chaldean Catholic Church (1989-2003).
- Mike Graham, 80, American football player (Los Angeles Dons, Green Bay Packers).
- Izhak Graziani, 78, Israeli conductor.
- Shlomo-Ya'akov Gross, 94, Israeli politician.
- Antonio Iranzo, 73, Spanish film actor.
- Charles Poor Kindleberger, 92, American economic historian and author, stroke.
- Zygmunt Konieczny, 76, Polish Olympic bobsledder (1956).
- Mario Pedini, 84, Italian politician.
- Fred G. Pollard, 85, American lawyer and politician.
- Ribs Raney, 80, American baseball player (St. Louis Browns).
- Tomiko Suzuki, 47, Japanese voice actress, heart attack.

=== 8 ===
- Ladan and Laleh Bijani, 29, Iranian conjoined twins, complications following separation surgery.
- Paul Brand, 88, British surgeon, pioneering leprosy research.
- Duncan Clark, 88, Scottish hammer thrower and Olympian (1948, 1952).
- Lewis A. Coser, 89, German-American sociologist.
- Marjorie Fowler, 82, American film editor.
- Etsuko Inada, 79, Japanese Olympic figure skater (1936).
- Egon Johansen, 85, Danish footballer.
- Subhash Mukhopadhyay, 84, Indian Bengali poets.
- Eduardo Prieto, 91, Mexican Olympic fencer and sailor (1932, 1964).

=== 9 ===
- Christopher Black Sr., 43, American convicted murderer, execution by lethal injection.
- Eberhard Blum, 84, German civil servant, head of the German Federal Intelligence Bureau (BND).
- Joe Cobbold, 76, English greyhound trainer.
- Valerie Gearon, 65, British actress.
- Josephine Jacobsen, 94, American poet, short story writer and essayist.
- Bob Morrow, 85, American football player (Chicago Cardinals, New York Giants, New York Yankees).
- Riley Dobi Noel, 31, American convicted murderer, execution by lethal injection.

=== 10 ===
- Alvin Alcorn, 90, American New Orleans jazz trumpeter.
- Winston Graham, 95, English novelist.
- Sheldon Jaffery, 69, American bibliographer.
- John Purdell, 44, American musician and record producer, cancer.
- Hartley Shawcross, 101, English barrister, politician and chief prosecutor at the Nuremberg Trials.
- Manuel Vasques, 76, Portuguese footballer.

=== 11 ===
- Humberto Aspitia, 74, Argentine Olympic sports shooter (1964).
- Stepan Chervonenko, 87, Soviet diplomat.
- Mickey Deans, 68, American discoteque manager and (last) husband of actress and singer Judy Garland, heart failure.
- Henry Gravrand, 81, French Catholic missionary to Africa and an anthropologist.
- Zahra Kazemi, 55, Iranian-Canadian journalist, blunt trauma to the head.
- Michèle de Saint Laurent, 76, French carcinologist.
- Dorothy Canning Miller, 99, American art curator.
- John Roach, 81, American cleric of the Roman Catholic Church.
- Bhisham Sahni, 87, Indian writer, playwright and an actor.
- Robert Gascoyne-Cecil, 6th Marquess of Salisbury, 86, British aristocrat and politician.
- Ray Whitrod, 88, Australian police officer and Queensland Police Commissioner.
- Ken Whyld, 77, British chess author (The Oxford Companion to Chess), historian and columnist.
- Teddy Yip, 96, Indonesian businessman, race car driver and team owner (Formula One, IndyCar).

=== 12 ===
- Syed Ishtiaq Ahmed, 71, Bangladeshi lawyer and constitutionalist.
- Benny Carter, 95, American jazz pioneer, bronchitis.
- Patricia Courtney, 71, American baseball player.
- Mark Lovell, 43, British rally driver, motor race accident.
- Ellis Paul Torrance, 87, American psychologist.
- Eliot Wald, 57, American comedy writer for theater, television and movies (The Second City, Saturday Night Live, Camp Nowhere).

=== 13 ===
- Alpha L. Bowser, 92, American U.S. Marine Corps lieutenant general (Battle of Iwo Jima, Battle of Chosin Reservoir).
- Dildar, 58, Bangladeshi actor.
- Salamat Hashim, 61, Filipino islamist militant, complications caused by a heart disease and acute ulcer.
- Jim Quinlan, 81, American basketball player (Rochester Royals).
- Eileen Rodgers, 73, American singer and Broadway performer, lung cancer.
- Compay Segundo, 95, Cuban musician and star of the Buena Vista Social Club, kidney failure.
- Alton Terry, 90, American javelin thrower and Olympian (1936).

=== 14 ===
- Leela Chitnis, 93, Indian actress.
- Jiří Dolana, 66, Czech Olympic ice hockey player (1964).
- Éva Janikovszky, 77, Hungarian writer.
- Morrissey Johnson, 70, Canadian politician (MP for Bonavista—Trinity—Conception, NL), motor vehicle collision with a moose.
- Rubén Marino Navarro, 70, Argentine football player.
- Louis Robertshaw, 90, American gridiron football player and US Marine Corps officer, cancer.
- Rajendra Singh, 81, Indian head of Hindu nationalist paramilitary organisation Rashtriya Swayamsevak Sangh.

=== 15 ===
- Roberto Bolaño, 50, Chilean-Spanish writer (The Savage Detectives, 2666), liver failure.
- Chuck Grigsby, 74, American basketball player (New York Knicks).
- John Richard Hyde, 90, Canadian soldier and politician.
- Lorraine Krueger, 85, American actress.
- Judith Hare, Countess of Listowel, 100, Hungarian-British writer and aristocrat.
- Alfred Preissler, 82, German football player and manager.
- Tex Schramm, 83, American president and general manager of the Dallas Cowboys football team.
- Alexander Walker, 73, Northern Irish film critic (London Evening Standard) and author.
- Elisabeth Welch, 99, American singer and actress.

=== 16 ===
- K. P. A. C. Azeez, 55, Indian actor in Malayalam cinema.
- Celia Cruz, 77, Cuban salsa singer, brain cancer.
- Ralph A. Foote, 80, American attorney and politician.
- Lu Gambino, 79, American gridiron football player (Indiana Hoosiers, Maryland Terrapins, Baltimore Colts).
- Shmuel Safrai, 84, Israeli writer, academic and historian.
- Kurt Semm, 76, German gynecologist and pioneer in minimally invasive surgery.
- Carol Shields, 68, Canadian author, breast cancer.
- Chesterfield Smith, 85, American lawyer.
- Alida van den Bos, 101, Dutch gymnast and Olympian (1928).
- Dmitry Vasilyev, 58, Soviet-Russian actor, monarchist, antisemite, and ultranationalist, heart attack.
- Reetika Vazirani, 40, Indian-American poet and educator, suicide by stabbing.

=== 17 ===
- Hans Abich, 84, German film producer.
- Manuel Franklin da Costa, 81, Angolan Roman Catholic archbishop.
- Erland Herkenrath, 90, Swiss field handball player and Olympian (1936).
- David Kelly, 59, British scientist and weapons expert, suicide by drug overdose.
- Walter Perry, 82, Scottish academic.
- Rosalyn Tureck, 89, American pianist and harpsichordist.
- Abdullah Yaqta, 89, Afghan politician, Prime Minister (1967).
- Walter Zapp, 97, Baltic German inventor (Minox subminiature camera).

=== 18 ===
- Jane Barbe, 74, American voice actress (phone company "Time Lady") and singer, cancer.
- Luther L. Bohanon, 100, American district judge.
- Marc Camoletti, 79, French playwright.
- Alfredo Faget, 80, Cuban Olympic basketball player (1948, 1952).
- Antoni Gołaś, 83, Polish Olympic wrestler (1952).
- Luis Pratsmasó, 86, Spanish Olympic field hockey player (1948).
- César Ramírez, 74, Filipino actor, heart attack.
- Norman Rasmussen, 75, American physicist.

=== 19 ===
- Bill Bright, 81, American evangelical Christian and founder of Campus Crusade for Christ.
- Elena Caffarena, 100, Chilean lawyer and politician.
- Maruchi Fresno, 87, Spanish film actress, heart attack.
- Pierre Graber, 94, Swiss politician and member of the Swiss Federal Council (1970–1978).
- Maldwyn James, 90, Welsh rugby union player.
- Jude Milhon, 64, American civil rights advocate, writer, hacker and feminista, cancer.
- Dorothy Stolze, 80, American baseball player.
- Vic Vargas, 64, Filipino actor.

=== 20 ===
- Lauri Aus, 32, Estonian Olympic racing cyclist (1992, 1996, 2000), struck on bicycle by drunk driver.
- Nicolas Freeling, 76, British crime writer.
- Renee Gadd, 95, Argentine-British film actress.
- Juli Gonzalvo, 86, Spanish football player.
- Carol Grace, 78, American actress and author, intracranial aneurysm.
- Vladimir Krantz, 90, Soviet Russian painter.
- Elliot Norton, 100, American theater critic, "The Dean of American Theatre Critics".
- Bill Schaefer, 77, New Zealand Olympic field hockey player (1956, 1960, 1964).
- William Woolfolk, 86, American novelist, screen writer, and comic book writer.

=== 21 ===
- John Davies, 65, New Zealand athlete, Olympian (1964), and president of the New Zealand Olympic Committee, melanoma.
- Matt Jefferies, 81, American art director (Star Trek series), designer of the Starship Enterprise, heart attack.
- Tim Hemensley, 31, Australian singer and bass guitarist, heroin overdose.
- Mike Kullman, 41, German-born American football player (Philadelphia Eagles).
- Shujauddin Siddiqi, 84, Indian first-class cricket player.

=== 22 ===
- Arthur W. Adamson, 83, American chemist, made contributions to inorganic photochemistry.
- Hamer H. Budge, 92, American politician (16th Chairman of the SEC, U.S. Representative for Idaho's 2nd congressional district).
- Enzo Faletto, 68, Chilean sociologist and historian.
- Elie Farah, 93, Lebanese Maronite Church archbishop.
- Stanley H. Fuld, 99, American lawyer, judge and politician.
- Qusay Hussein, 37, Iraqi politician and second son of Saddam Hussein, killed by US troops.
- Uday Hussein, 39, Iraqi politician and eldest son of Saddam Hussein, killed by US troops.
- Lee Knorek, 82, American basketball player (New York Knicks, Baltimore Bullets).
- Jack Lennard, 73, Austrian soccer player and Olympian (1956).
- Norman Lewis, 95, British travel writer.
- Georges Robini, 89, Monegasque Olympic sports shooter (1952).
- Dhimitër Shuteriqi, 87, Albanian scholar, literary historian, and writer.
- Serge Silberman, 86, French film producer.
- Richard L. Walker, 81, American diplomat (U.S. Ambassador to South Korea) and professor.

=== 23 ===
- Sheila Bromley, 95, American television and film actress (Westward Ho, Lawless Range, Perry Mason).
- James E. Davis, 41, American policeman, corrections officer, and politician, homicide.
- Adolphe Deledda, 83, Italian-French road bicycle racer.
- Juan Delis, 75, Cuban baseball player (Washington Senators).
- Inge Eckel, 70, German Olympic sprinter (1952).
- Gary King, 55, American jazz bassist, songwriter, composer, and arranger.
- Adrien Lambert, 90, Canadian politician, member of the House of Commons of Canada (1968-1980).
- Jean-Claude Pressac, 59, French chemist, pharmacist and writer.
- Yvonne Sanson, 76, Italian film actress, aneurysm.
- Speedy Thomas, 56, American football player (Cincinnati Bengals, New Orleans Saints).
- Novak Tomić, 67, Serbian football player.
- Grady Wilson, 80, American baseball player (Pittsburgh Pirates).
- John Yates, 73, New Zealand rugby league footballer.

=== 24 ===
- James Alesia, 69, American district judge (United States District Court for the Northern District of Illinois).
- Iya Arepina, 73, Soviet/Russian actress.
- Henri Attal, 67, French actor, asthma.
- Samit Bhanja, 59, Indian actor and director.
- Ella Orr Campbell, 92, New Zealand botanist.
- Božidar Drenovac, 81, Serbian football player and manager.
- Warren Kremer, 82, American comics cartoonist.
- Ryōichi Kuroda, 92, Japanese jurist and politician, pneumonia.
- Colin R. McMillan, 67, American Assistant Secretary of Defense (1990-1992).
- Maurice Pryce, 90, British physicist.
- Dan Smoot, 89, American FBI agent and political activist.
- Werner Sobeck, 81, German Olympic diver (1952).

=== 25 ===
- Erik Brann, 52, American Iron Butterfly guitarist, heart attack.
- Ludwig Bölkow, 91, German aeronautical engineer, designed the world's first jet fighter, Nazi Germany's Me 262.
- Hal Herbert, 81, British-Canadian politician, member of the House of Commons of Canada (1972-1984).
- Jiří Horák, 79, Czech politician and political analyst.
- Norm McRae, 55, American baseball player (Detroit Tigers).
- Franco Reyser, 99, Italian Olympic sprinter (1928).
- Thomas Savage, 88, American novelist.
- John Schlesinger, 77, English film director (Midnight Cowboy, Marathon Man, Sunday Bloody Sunday), Oscar winner (1970), stroke.

=== 26 ===
- Marius Bonnet, 81, French racing cyclist.
- Jürgen Brandt, 80, German general and Chief of Federal Armed Forces Staff (1978-1983).
- Red Corzine, 94, American football player (Cincinnati Reds, St. Louis Gunners, New York Giants).
- William Dargie, 91, Australian painter.
- Robert Favart, 92, French actor.
- John Higham, 82, American historian.
- Hilde Levi, 94, German-Danish physicist.
- Norman Charles Roettger Jr., 72, American district judge (United States District Court for the Southern District of Florida).
- Harold C. Schonberg, 87, American music critic and journalist.
- Gordon Taylor, 93, Canadian politician, businessman and teacher.

=== 27 ===
- Lajos von Sipeki-von Balás, 89, Hungarian Olympic modern pentathlete (1936).
- Karin Booth, 87, American film and TV actress.
- Pierre Bouvier, 69, French Olympic bobsledder (1956).
- Vance Hartke, 84, American politician (United States Senator from Indiana from 1959 to 1977).
- Henning Holck-Larsen, 96, Danish engineer and entrepreneur.
- Bob Hope, 100, British-American comedian and actor (Road to ...), pneumonia.
- Cliff Johnson, 74, New Zealand rugby league footballer.
- Nguza Karl-i-Bond, 64, Zairean politician.
- Rinty Monahan, 75, American baseball player (Philadelphia Athletics).
- Alfredo Eduardo Barreto de Freitas Noronha, 84, Brazilian football player and manager.
- Emmanuel Pelaez, 87, Filipino public servant and politician, heart attack.
- Charlie Rivera, 91, Puerto Rican baseball player.
- Audrius Šlekys, 28, Lithuanian football player, traffic collision.
- István Szimcsák, 70, Hungarian footballer.

=== 28 ===
- Gladys Edgerly Bates, 107, American sculptor, member of the Philadelphia Ten, founding member of the Mystic Museum of Art.
- Aaron Bell, 82, American jazz bassist, composer and teacher, bassist for Duke Ellington.
- René Berg, 47, English musician, vocalist, guitarist, and songwriter.
- True Eames Boardman, 93, American actor and scriptwriter (Gunsmoke, Perry Mason, The Virginian, Bonanza), pancreatic cancer.
- Adrian Burk, 75, American gridiron football player (Baylor, Baltimore Colts, Philadelphia Eagles).
- Jorge Guerra, 89, Chilean Olympic cyclist (1936).
- Rod Hills, 56, British politician and academic.
- Gaston Lesturgeon, 66, French Olympic judoka (1964).
- Max Marolt, 67, American Olympic alpine skier (1960).

=== 29 ===
- Sabahudin Bilalović, 43, Bosnian basketball player.
- Rudolf Fischer, 90, German pianist and pedagogue.
- Luther Henderson, 84, American arranger, composer, and pianist.
- George Maloney, 75, American baseball umpire.
- Tex McCrary, 92, American journalist and public relations specialist.
- Jim Pruett, 85, American baseball player (Philadelphia Athletics).
- Foday Sankoh, 65, Sierra Leonean rebel leader, complications following a stroke.
- Gerard Folliott Vaughan, 80, British psychiatrist and politician.
- Johnny Walker, 82, Indian comic actor, appeared in more than 300 films.

=== 30 ===
- Howard Armstrong, 94, American string band fiddler and mandolinist and country blues musician, heart attack.
- Marian Carr, 77, American actress.
- Gene Hasson, 88, American baseball player (Philadelphia Athletics).
- Steve Hislop, 41, Scottish motorcycle racer, helicopter accident.
- Ewa Krzyżewska, 64, Polish actress, traffic collision.
- Alicia Lourteig, 89, Argentine and French botanist, expert in Oxalidaceae.
- Mendel L. Peterson, 85, American archeologist and former curator at the Smithsonian Institution.
- Sam Phillips, 80, American record producer, respiratory failure.
- Ahmed Safwat, 56, Egyptian squash player, heart attack.
- Carlos Lemos Simmonds, 69, Colombian politician, Vice President (1996-1998), lung cancer.

=== 31 ===
- Edward P. Alexander, 96, American historian and author, heart ailment.
- John Aston, Sr., 81, English football player.
- Bigode, 81, Brazilian footballer, respiratory problems.
- Frederick Coffin, 60, American film actor, singer, songwriter, and musician, lung cancer.
- Guido Crepax, 70, Italian comics artist, multiple sclerosis.
- Patricia S. Goldman-Rakic, 66, American professor neuroscience, psychiatry and psychology, struck by a car.
- Art Green, 82, British ice hockey player and Olympian (1948).
- Sardar Ibrahim Khan, 88, Pakistani politician, first President of Azad Kashmir.
- Roland Svensson, 93, Swedish painter, writer, and artist.
