= Heinz Leu =

Swiss bobsledder

Medal record

Bobsleigh

World Championships
Gold medal – first place	1957 St. Moritz	Four-man

Heinz Leu was a Swiss bobsledder who competed in the mid-1950s. He won a gold medal in the four-man event at the 1957 FIBT World Championships in St. Moritz with Hans Theler, Rolf Küderli and Hans Zoller.

In December 1968 he acted as stuntman for actor George Lazenby in the James Bond cinema film "On Her Majesty's Secret Service" at the bob chase scene with actor Telly Savalas near the new revolving restaurant Piz Gloria on the Schilthorn.

Heinz Leu was born 9 August 1934 in Zurich and was a graduate of the Lyceum Alpinum Zuoz, an international private boarding school in Zuoz, near St.Moritz in Switzerland.
