= Sune Skagerling =

Swedish bobsledder

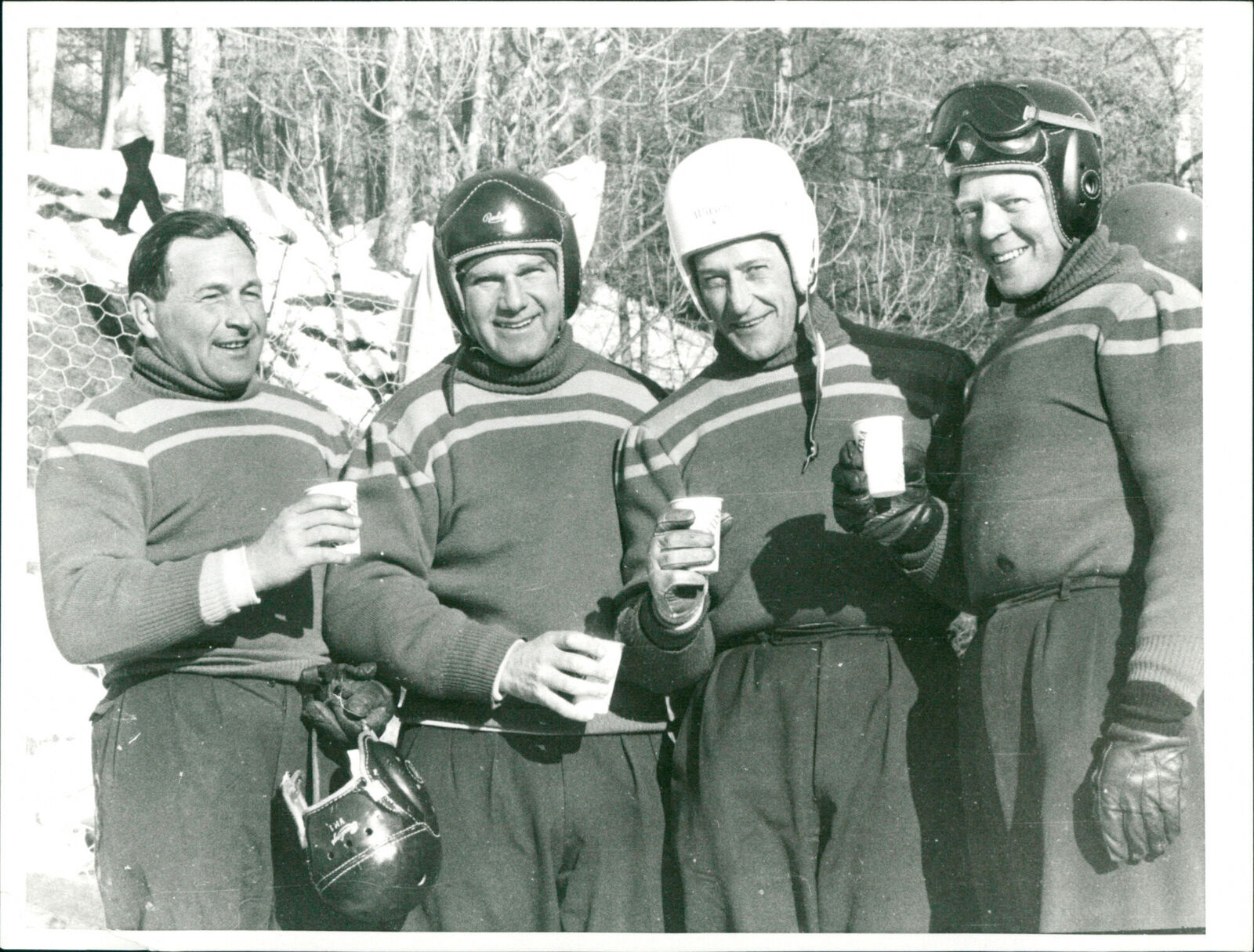
Olympics in Cortina. The Swedish four-man bobsleigh team strengthens its side with a cup of hot chocolate after the races. From left: Gunnar Åhs, Ebbe Wallén, Sune Skagerling and Olle Axelsson.

Sune Ralf Bertil Skagerling (September 27, 1919 – November 28, 1997) was a Swedish bobsledder who competed in the 1956 Winter Olympics.

Together with Olle Axelsson, Ebbe Wallén, and Gunnar Åhs he was a crew member of Sweden I who finished 16th in the four-man event.

He was born in Stockholm and died in Tyresö.
