= Ebbe Wallén =

Swedish bobsledder

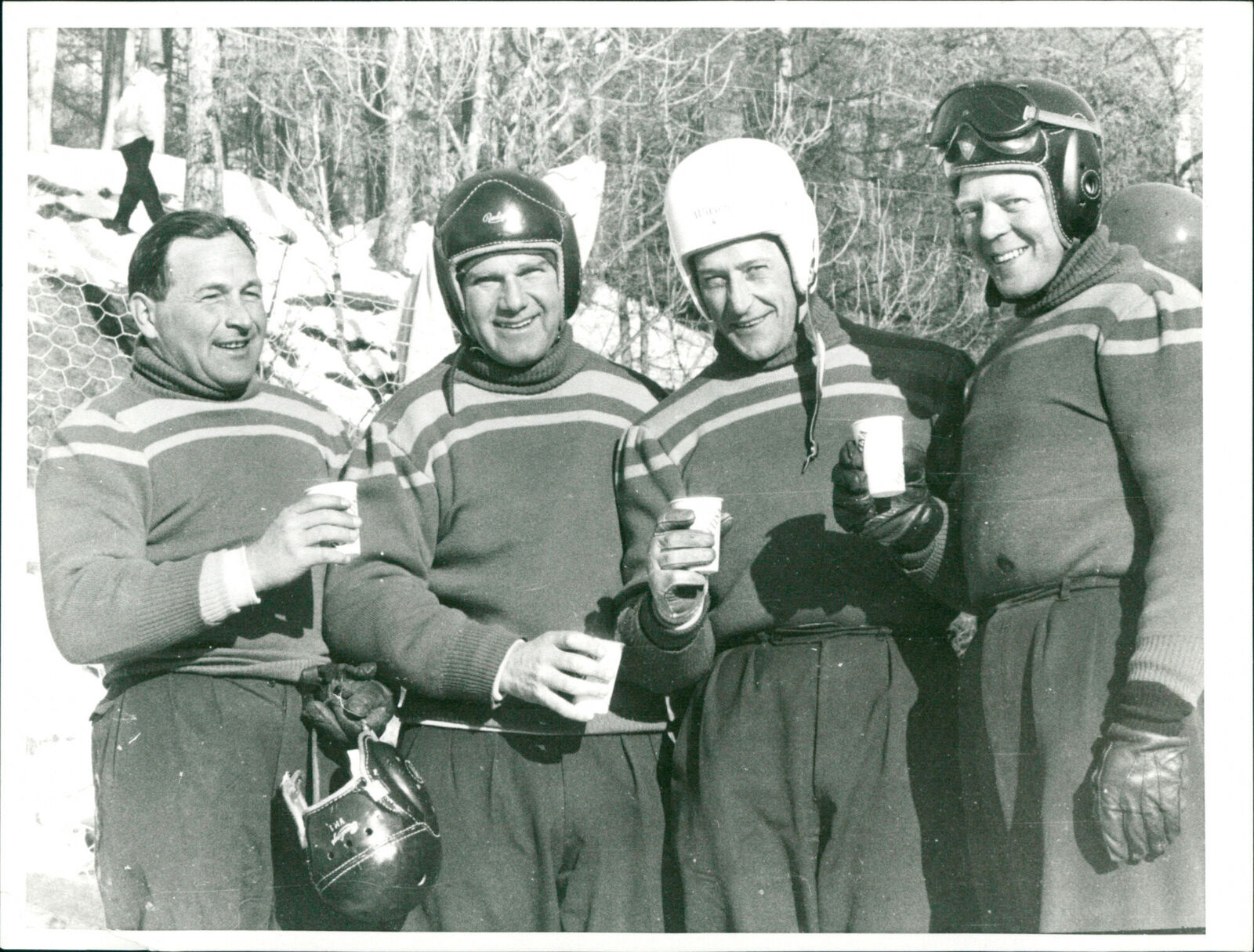
Olympics in Cortina. The Swedish four-man bobsleigh team strengthens its side with a cup of hot chocolate after the races. From left: Gunnar Åhs, Ebbe Wallén, Sune Skagerling and Olle Axelsson.

Ebbe Wallén (January 2, 1917 – July 19, 2009) was a Swedish bobsledder who competed in the 1956 Winter Olympics.

Together with Olle Axelsson, Sune Skagerling, and Gunnar Åhs he was a crew member of Sweden I who finished 16th in the four-man event.

He was born in Väddö and grew up in Virserum.
