= Moritz Heidegger =

Liechtenstein bobsledder (1932–1956)

Personal information
- Nationality: Liechtenstein
- Born: 4 December 1932
- Died: 12 February 1956 (aged 23)
- Parent(s): Marzell Heidegger; Cäcilia Tschugmell
- Relatives: Ferdinand Heidegger (uncle); Fridolin Tschugmell (uncle)

Sport
- Sport: Bobsleigh

Moritz Heidegger (4 December 1932 – 12 February 1956) was a Liechtensteiner bobsledder who competed in the 1956 Winter Olympics. He died in a bobsledding accident the following month.

== Life ==
Heidegger was from Triesen and was the son of Liechtenstein government councillor Marzell Heidegger. He took part in the 1956 Winter Olympics in Cortina d'Ampezzo. He competed in the two-man event with his pusher Weltin Wolfinger. However, the duo was in last place after the second of four runs and therefore did not start again.

Two weeks later, the two athletes started on the Olympic Bob Run in St. Moritz. During the race, the bobsleigh skidded and the track collapsed, as a result of which it overturned several times. Despite wearing a helmet, Heidegger was severely hit in the back of the head by the bumpers. The President of the Liechtenstein Federation, baron Eduard Theodor von Falz-Fein, immediately drove Heidegger to the hospital in Samedan. However, Heidegger did not regain consciousness and died a few days later. As a result, bobsleighing was temporarily banned in Liechtenstein.

His brother Jakob had died in a motorcycling accident the year prior.
