= Marusarz =

Marusarz is a Polish surname typical for Goral population of Zakopane region. Notable people include:

- Józef Marusarz (1926–1996), Polish alpine skier
- Stanisław Marusarz (1913–1993), Polish Nordic-combined skier
- Wojciech Marusarz (born 1993), Polish Nordic-combined skier
