= Edgar Seymour =

American bobsledder

Edgar Duff Seymour (June 25, 1912, Cedar Falls, Iowa – April 30, 2011) was an American bobsledder who competed in the late 1950s.

He attended the Pennsylvania State University from 1934 to 1938. At the 1956 Winter Olympics in Cortina d'Ampezzo he finished sixth with his partner Arthur Tyler in the two-man event.

== See also ==
- List of Pennsylvania State University Olympians
