= Tryggve Sundström =

Swedish bobsledder

Tryggve Sundström (September 28, 1920 – November 7, 1984) was a Swedish bobsledder who competed in the 1956 Winter Olympics.

Together with Olle Axelsson he finished 17th in the two-man event.

He was born in Kuddby and died in Stockholm.
