= Moiceanu =

Moiceanu is a Romanian surname. Notable people with the surname include:

- Gabriel Moiceanu (1934–2025), Romanian cyclist
- Nicolae Moiceanu (born 1927), Romanian bobsledder
- Viorel Moiceanu (born 1954), Romanian football player
