= Pandrea =

Pandrea is a Romanian-language surname, originating from the dialectal Oltenian pandru, or "pond" (plural: pandre). People with the surname include:

- Nicolae Pandrea, alpine skier
- Perry Pandrea, one-time member of the Marilyn Manson band
- Petre Pandrea (born Petre Marcu), scholar, political figure, memoirist and political prisoner
