= Aleksander Kowalski =

Aleksander Kowalski or Kowalsky may refer to:

- Aleksander Kowalski (ice hockey) (1902-1940), Polish ice hockey player
- Aleksander Kowalski (skier), Polish Nordic combined skier
- Aleksander Kowalski (politician) (1908–1951), Polish trade union activist
- Aleksander Kowalsky (born 1943), Croatian-Austrian classical music conductor
- Alexander Kowalski (musician) (born 1978), German DJ, electronic music artist
