= FIBT World Championships 1957 =

Winter sport competition

1957 World Championships
- Location: St. Moritz, Switzerland

The FIBT World Championships 1957 took place in St. Moritz, Switzerland for the record eighth time. The Swiss city had hosted the event previously in 1931 (Four-man), 1935 (Four-man), 1937 (Four-man), 1938 (Two-man), 1939 (Two-man), 1947, and 1955. It also marked the first time the unified championships took place in the same location in consecutive championships.

== Two man bobsleigh ==
Pos	Team	Time
Gold	Italy (Eugenio Monti, Renzo Alverà)	
Silver	United States (Arthur Tyler, Thomas Butler)	
Bronze	Spain (Marquess of Portago, Luis Muñoz)	

This is Spain's only medal at the FIBT World Championships as of 2024. Portago would die later that year in the Mille Miglia competition in Italy.

== Four man bobsleigh ==
Pos	Team	Time
Gold	Switzerland (Hans Zoller, Hans Theler, Rolf Küderli, Heinz Leu)	
Silver	Italy (Eugenio Monti, Ferdinando Piani, Lino Pierdica, Renzo Alverà)	
Bronze	United States (Arthur Tyler, John Cole, Robert Hagemes, Thomas Butler)	

== Medal table ==
Rank	Nation	Gold	Silver	Bronze	Total
1	Italy (ITA)	1	1	0	2
2	Switzerland (SUI)	1	0	0	1
3	United States (USA)	0	1	1	2
4	Spain (ESP)	0	0	1	1
Totals (4 entries)		2	2	2	6
