= Chmura =

Chmura is a Polish surname meaning "cloud". Notable people with the surname include:

- Mark Chmura (born 1969), American football player
- Mieczysław Chmura (1934–1980), Polish ice hockey player
- Sławomir Chmura (born 1983), Polish speed skater
- Helena Chmura Kraemer, American biostatistician
