= Stanisław Szlendak =

Polish ice hockey player

- Born: 21 May 1920; Krynica-Zdrój, Poland
- Died: 24 January 1998 (aged 77); Krynica, Poland
- Position: Goaltender
- Played for: Podhale Nowy Targ; KTH Krynica; KS Jaworzyna
- National team: Poland
- Playing career: 1934–1939; 1946–1956

Stanisław Szlendak (21 May 1920 – 24 January 1998), was a Polish ice hockey player. He played for Podhale Nowy Targ, KTH Krynica, and KS Jaworzyna during his career. He also played for the Polish national team at the 1952 Winter Olympics. With Krynica he won the 1950 Polish league championship.
