= Robert Hagemes =

American bobsledder (1935–2025)

Medal record

Bobsleigh

World Championships
Bronze medal – third place	1957 St. Moritz	Four-man

Robert Hagemes (August 17, 1935 – June 26, 2025) was an American bobsledder who competed in the late 1950s. He won a bronze medal in the four-man event at the 1957 FIBT World Championships in St. Moritz. He was from Allentown, Pennsylvania.

Hagemes was born on August 17, 1935. He died on June 26, 2025, at the age of 89.

== Sources ==
- Bobsleigh four-man world championship medalists since 1930
