= Lino Pierdica =

Italian bobsledder

Medal record

Bobsleigh

World Championships
| Silver medal – second place | 1957 St. Moritz | Four-man |

Lino Pierdica was an Italian bobsledder who competed in the late 1950s. He won a silver medal in the four-man event at the 1957 FIBT World Championships in St. Moritz.
