= Donald Jacques =

American bobsledder

Personal information
- Born: May 10, 1934 Lake Placid, New York, United States
- Died: December 4, 1983 (aged 49) Lake Placid, New York, United States

Sport
- Sport: Bobsleigh

Donald Jacques (May 10, 1934 – December 4, 1983) was an American bobsledder. He competed in the four-man event at the 1956 Winter Olympics.
