= Giovanni De Martin =

Italian bobsledder (1927–1999)

Giovanni De Martin (7 December 1927 – 4 November 1999) was an Italian bobsledder who competed in the late 1950s. He finished fifth in the four-man event at the 1956 Winter Olympics in Cortina d'Ampezzo.
