= John Cole (bobsleigh) =

American bobsledder

Medal record

Bobsleigh

World Championships
Bronze medal – third place	1957 St. Moritz	Four-man

John Cole was an American bobsledder who competed in the late 1950s. He won a bronze medal in the four-man event at the 1957 FIBT World Championships in St. Moritz.

He was born in Utica, December 28, 1929, the son of the late Edward and Neva Trossetti Cole. John was an Army Veteran of the Korean War. For many years, he operated Cole's Hardware in Utica, New York and later was self-employed painting contractor. John was a member of St. Peter's Church, the William E. Burke Knights of Columbus Council #189 and past President of the Guys and Gals Single's Club. In 1957 John won a Bronze Medal with the U.S. Bob Sled team in the World Championships in St. Moritz, Switzerland.

John passed on March 4, 1993. John is survived by a daughter and son-in-law, Kathleen and Robert Bushey, Deerfield NY; three sons and one daughter-in-law, David and Janet Cole; Utica, NY, Bradley Cole, Ellensburg, WA; James Cole, Utica NY; five grandchildren Andrew and Cassandra Bushey; Michael, Karen and John Cole.

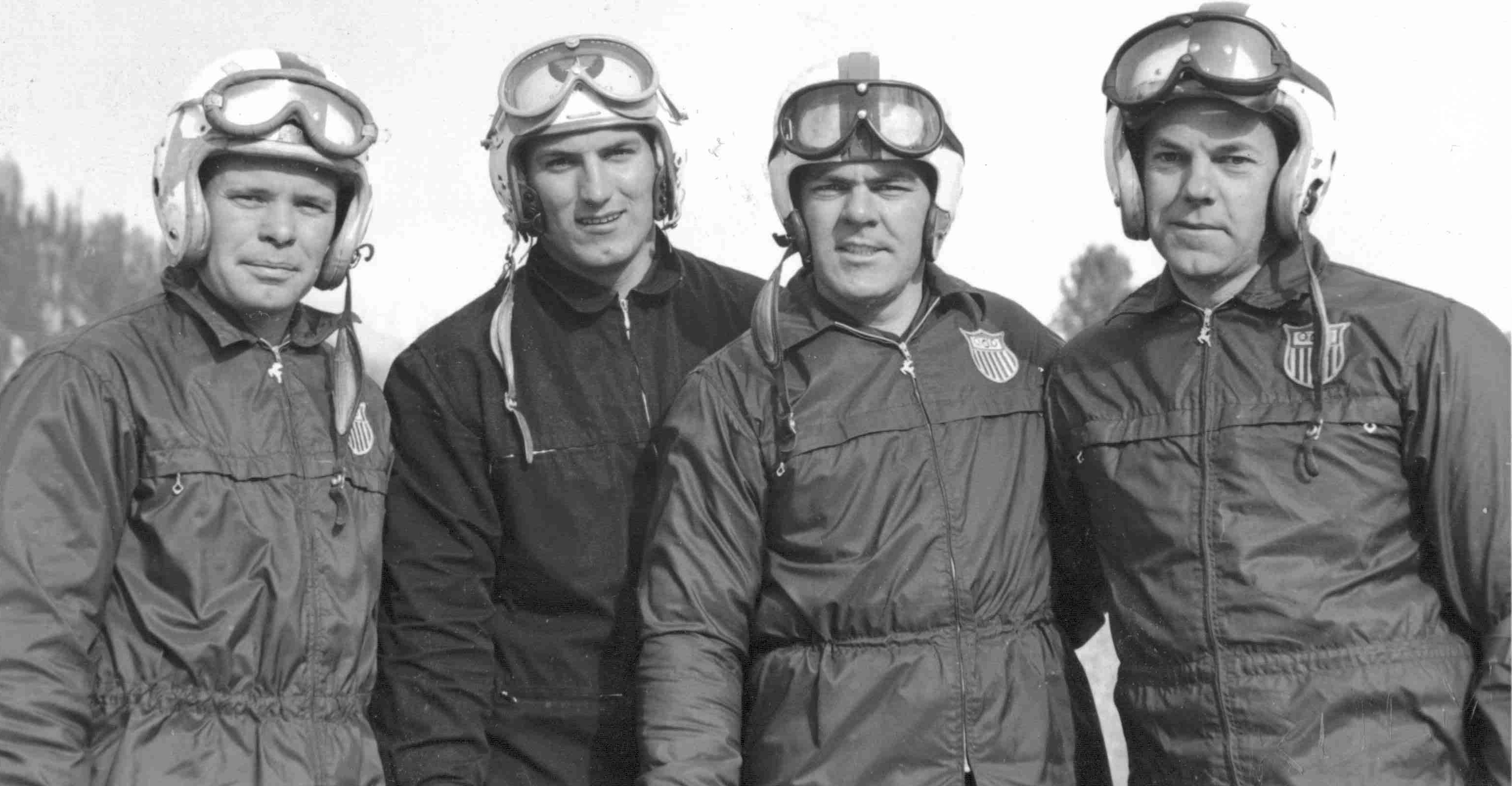
1957 Four-man Bobsled Team

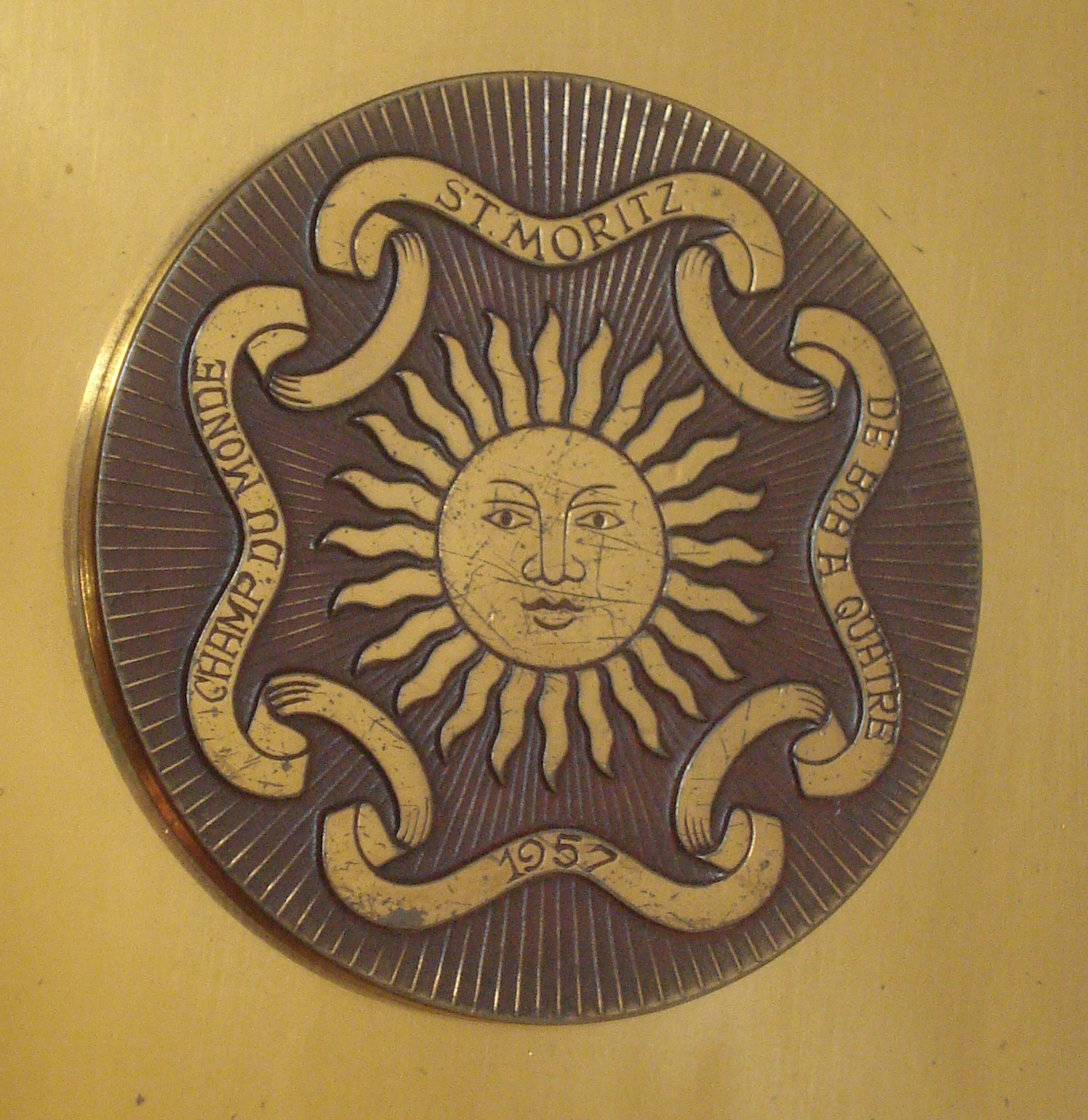
John Cole's Bronze medal
