= Zdzisław Nowak (ice hockey) =

Polish ice hockey player

- Born: 25 February 1928 Krynica, Poland
- Died: 25 November 2000 (aged 72) Krynica, Poland
- Height: 5 ft 8 in (173 cm)
- Weight: 159 lb (72 kg; 11 st 5 lb)
- Position: Left wing
- Played for: KTH Krynica; Legia Warsaw
- National team: Poland
- Playing career: 1947–1960

Zdzisław Ignacy Nowak (25 February 1928 – 25 November 2000) was a Polish ice hockey player.

== Career ==
During his career, Nowak played for KTH Krynica and Legia Warsaw. He was also a member of the Polish national team at the 1956 Winter Olympics, and the 1955 and 1957 World Championships. Nowak won the Polish league championship five times, with KTH Krynica in 1950, and with Legia from 1952 to 1955.
