= Ferdinando Piani =

Italian bobsledder

Medal record

Representing Italy

Bobsleigh

World Championships
Silver medal – second place	1957 St. Moritz	Four-man

Ferdinando Piani was an Italian bobsledder who competed in the late 1950s. He won a silver medal in the four-man event at the 1957 FIBT World Championships in St. Moritz.
