= Dino De Martin =

Italian bobsledder (1921–1960)

Dino De Martin (1 February 1921 – 31 July 1960) was an Italian bobsledder who competed in the late 1950s. He finished fifth in the four-man event at the 1956 Winter Olympics in Cortina d'Ampezzo. He died in Lignano Sabbiadoro on 31 July 1960, at the age of 39.
