= Fellay =

Fellay may refer to:

- Bernard Fellay (born 1958), Swiss bishop
- Raymond Fellay (1932–1994), Swiss skier
