= Rodney Mann =

British bobsledder

Personal information
- Nationality: British
- Born: 30 September 1929
- Died: 8 January 2005 (aged 75)

Sport
- Sport: Bobsleigh

Rodney Mann (30 September 1929 – 8 January 2005) was a British bobsledder. He competed in the four-man event at the 1956 Winter Olympics.
