= Rollo Brandt =

British bobsledder

Personal information
- Nationality: British
- Born: 25 November 1934; St Albans, England
- Died: 24 May 1964 (aged 29); St Albans, England

Sport
- Sport: Bobsleigh

Rollo Brandt (25 November 1934 – 24 May 1964) was a British bobsledder. He was educated at Oundle School and St John's College, Cambridge, where he led the college's rugby union team to several wins over other Cambridge colleges.

He competed in the four-man event at the 1956 Winter Olympics, as part of the British crew that finished 12th.
