= Frank Dominik =

Austrian bobsledder (born 1937)

Personal information
- Nationality: Austrian
- Born: 7 January 1937 (age 89)

Sport
- Sport: Bobsleigh

Frank Dominik (born 7 January 1937) is an Austrian bobsledder. He competed in the four-man event at the 1956 Winter Olympics.
