= Karl Schwarzböck =

Austrian bobsledder

Personal information
- Nationality: Austrian
- Born: 3 November 1929

Sport
- Sport: Bobsleigh

Karl Schwarzböck (born 3 November 1929) is an Austrian bobsledder. He competed in the four-man event at the 1956 Winter Olympics.
