= Serge Giacchini =

French bobsledder (1932–2021)

Personal information
- Nationality: French
- Born: 17 January 1932
- Died: 11 March 2021 (aged 89)

Sport
- Sport: Bobsleigh

Serge Giacchini (17 January 1932 – 11 March 2021) was a French bobsledder. He competed in the two-man event at the 1956 Winter Olympics.
