= John Read (bobsleigh) =

British bobsledder

Personal information
- Nationality: British
- Born: 27 February 1926; Ringwood, Hampshire, England
- Died: 12 April 2000 (aged 74); Salisbury, Wiltshire, England

Sport
- Sport: Bobsleigh

John Read (27 February 1926 – 12 April 2000) was a British bobsledder. He competed in the four-man event at the 1956 Winter Olympics.
