= Luis Muñoz (bobsledder) =

Spanish bobsledder (1928–1989)

Personal information
- Full name: Luis Muñoz Cabreron
- National team: Spain
- Born: 12 February 1928 Madrid, Spain
- Died: 17 July 1989 (aged 61) San Pedro Alcántara, Spain

Sport
- Sport: Bobsleigh
Medal record
Representing Spain
World Championships
Bronze medal – third place	1957 St. Moritz	Two-man

Luis Muñoz Cabrero (12 February 1928 – 17 July 1989) was a Spanish bobsledder, who competed in double and quadruple bobsleigh.

He competed in the four-man event at the 1956 Winter Olympics in Cortina D'Ampezzo, placing ninth.

He won a bronze medal at the 1957 World Bobsleigh Championships in the double event along with Alfonso de Portago.
