= Ralph Raffles =

British bobsledder

Personal information
- Nationality: British
- Born: 5 May 1920 Prestwich, England
- Died: 5 January 2008 (aged 87) Manchester, England

Sport
- Sport: Bobsleigh

Major Ralph Leslie Stamford Raffles (5 May 1920 – 5 January 2008) was a British businessman, philanthropist, soldier and sportsman. As a bobsledder he competed in the four-man event at the 1956 Winter Olympics. He was High Sheriff of Greater Manchester in 1979-1980.
