= Carlo Da Prà =

Italian bobsledder (1931–1993)

Carlo Da Pra (5 October 1931 – 19 November 1993) was an Italian bobsledder who competed in the late 1950s. He finished fifth in the four-man event at the 1956 Winter Olympics in Cortina d'Ampezzo. He won the four-man gold medal at the Italian championships in 1955 with Dino De Martin, Giovanni De Martin and Giovanni Tabacchi. He was born in Lozzo di Cadore. He died on 19 November 1993, at the age of 62.
