= Gonzalo Taboada =

Spanish bobsledder (1928–2017)

Personal information
- Nationality: Spanish
- Born: 5 November 1928 Madrid, Spain
- Died: 2 February 2017 (aged 88)

Sport
- Sport: Bobsleigh

Gonzalo Taboada (5 November 1928 – 2 February 2017) was a Spanish bobsledder. He competed in the four-man event at the 1956 Winter Olympics.
