= Stefan Csorich =

Polish ice hockey player and coach

- Born: September 25, 1921 Nowy Sącz, Poland
- Died: July 15, 2008 (aged 86) Gdańsk, Poland
- Height: 5 ft 7 in (170 cm)
- Weight: 172 lb (78 kg; 12 st 4 lb)
- Position: Left wing
- Played for: KTH Krynica
- National team: Poland
- Playing career: 1946–1960

Stefan Csorich (25 September 1921 – 15 July 2008) was a Polish ice hockey player. He played for KTH Krynica during his career. He also played for the Polish national team at the 1948 and 1952 Winter Olympics, and several World Championships. After his playing career, he turned to coaching. He won the 1950 Polish league championship with Krynica. During the Second World War Csorich was captured during the invasion of Poland and interned in Hungary, before getting to France and subsequently the United Kingdom, serving in both their militaries, while also briefly playing hockey in Scotland.

In 2004 he was awarded the Officer's Cross of the Order of Polonia Restituta, in recognition of his services.
