= Fritz Rursch =

Austrian bobsledder

Personal information
- Nationality: Austrian
- Born: 31 May 1929

Sport
- Sport: Bobsleigh

Fritz Rursch (born 31 May 1929) is an Austrian former bobsledder. He competed in the four-man event at the 1956 Winter Olympics.
