= Jacques Panciroli =

French bobsledder

Personal information
- Nationality: French
- Born: 4 December 1931 (age 93); Paris, France

Sport
- Sport: Bobsleigh

Jacques Panciroli (born 4 December 1931) is a French bobsledder. He competed in the four-man event at the 1956 Winter Olympics.
