= André Donnet =

French bobsledder (1922–1963)

Personal information
- Full name: André Roger Donnet
- Nationality: French
- Born: 27 May 1922 Paris, France
- Died: 25 August 1963 (aged 41) Poissy, France

Sport
- Sport: Bobsleigh

André Roger Donnet (27 May 1922 – 25 August 1963) was a French bobsledder who competed in the two-man event at the 1956 Winter Olympics. Donnet died in Poissy on 25 August 1963, at the age of 41.
