= Włodzimierz Źróbik =

Polish bobsledder

Personal information
- Nationality: Polish
- Born: 1 July 1926; Wiśniew, Poland
- Died: 12 August 1994 (aged 68); Warsaw, Poland

Sport
- Sport: Bobsleigh

Włodzimierz Źróbik (1 July 1926 – 12 August 1994) was a Polish bobsledder. He competed in the four-man event at the 1956 Winter Olympics.
