= William Dodge (bobsleigh) =

American bobsledder

Olympic medal record

Men's Bobsleigh

Representing United States
Bronze medal – third place	1956 Cortina d'Ampezzo	Four-man

William Longstreth Dodge (January 7, 1925 – July 7, 1987) was an American bobsledder who competed in the mid-1950s. He won a bronze medal in the four-man event at the 1956 Winter Olympics in Cortina d'Ampezzo.
