= Elena Epuran =

Romanian alpine skier (born 1931)

Personal information
- Nationality: Romanian
- Born: 15 November 1931; Predeal, Romania

Sport
- Sport: Alpine skiing

Elena Epuran (born 15 November 1931) is a Romanian alpine skier. She competed in three events at the 1956 Winter Olympics.
