= Magdalena Marotineanu =

Romanian alpine skier (1931–2001)

Personal information
- Nationality: Romanian
- Born: 29 July 1931 Bucharest, Romania
- Died: 2001 (aged 69–70)

Sport
- Sport: Alpine skiing

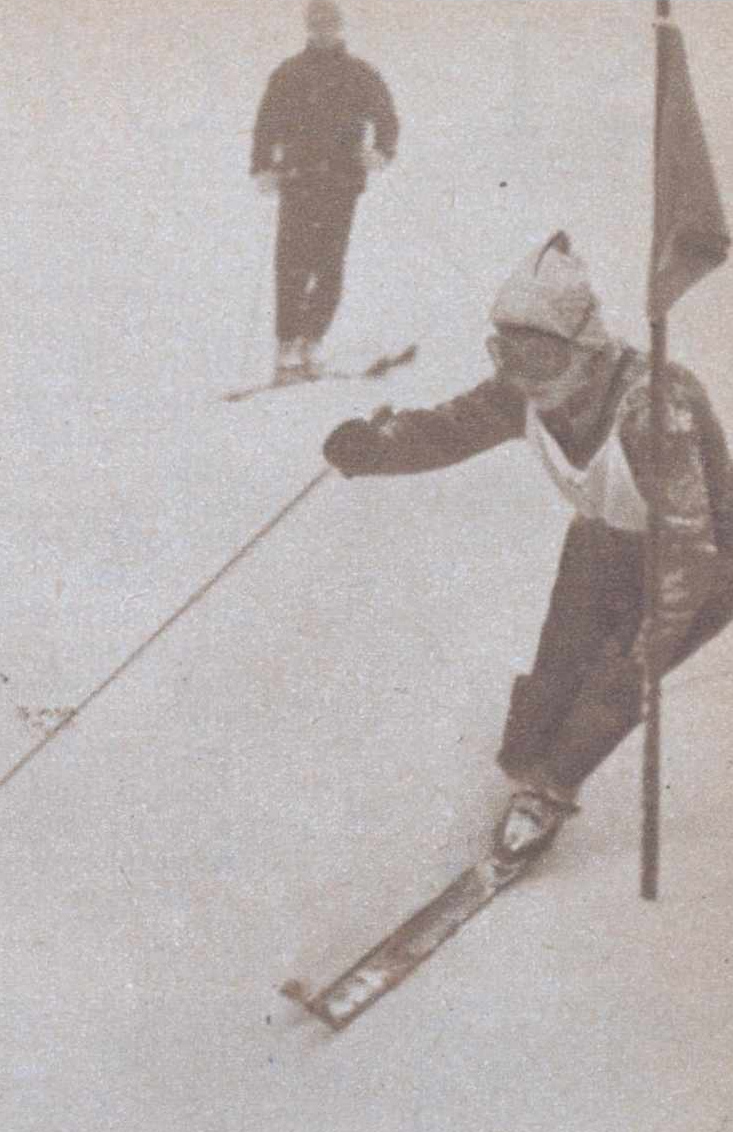
Magdalena Marotineanu at Poiana.

Magdalena Marotineanu (29 July 1931 – 2001) was a Romanian alpine skier. She competed in three events at the 1956 Winter Olympics.
