= Iuliana Simon =

Romanian cross-country skier (born 1934)

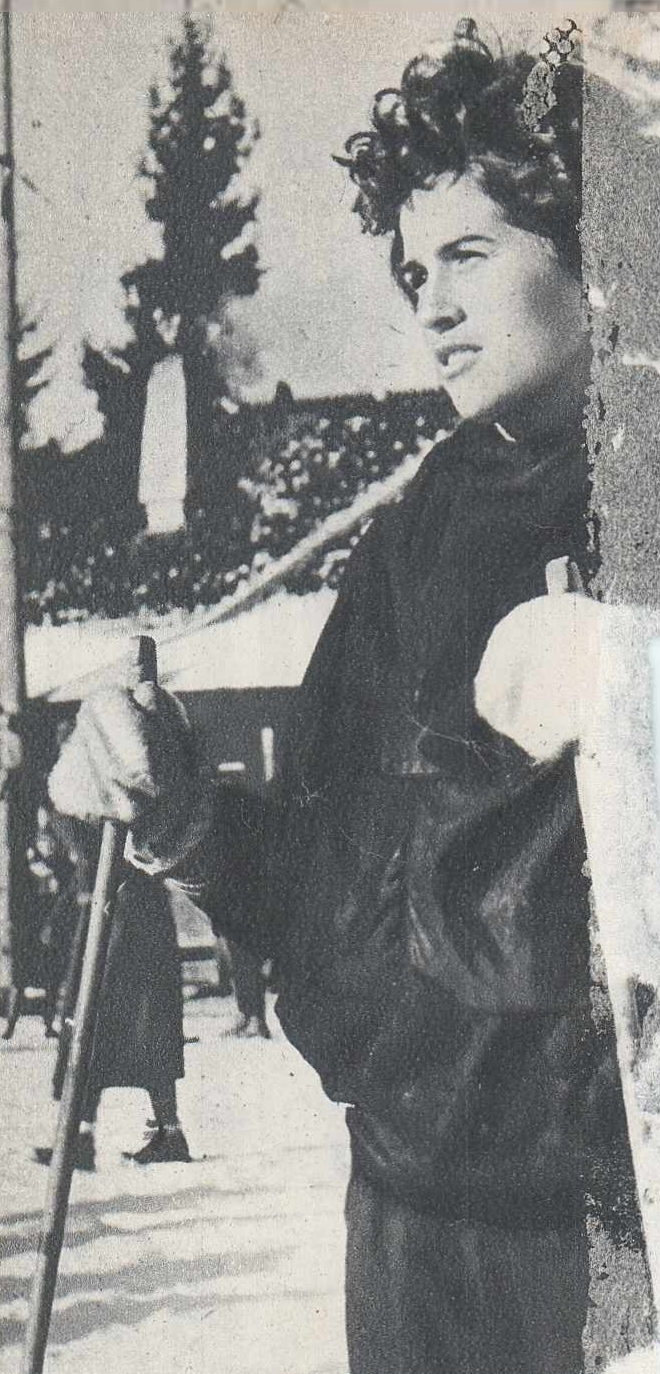
- Simon in 1958

Personal information
- Nationality: Romanian
- Born: 22 February 1934 (age 92) Tușnad, Romania

Sport
- Sport: Cross-country skiing

Iuliana Simon (born 22 February 1934) is a Romanian cross-country skier. She competed in the women's 10 kilometres and the women's 3 × 5 kilometre relay events at the 1956 Winter Olympics.
