= Weltin Wolfinger =

Liechtenstein bobsledder (1926–2010)

Personal information
- Nationality: Liechtenstein
- Born: 12 May 1926; Montreux, Switzerland
- Died: 15 July 2010 (aged 84); Geneva, Switzerland

Sport
- Sport: Bobsleigh

Weltin Wolfinger (12 May 1926 – 15 July 2010) was a Liechtensteiner bobsledder. He competed in the two-man event at the 1956 Winter Olympics.
