= Aleksander Habela =

Polish bobsledder (1933–2015)

Personal information
- Nationality: Polish
- Born: 10 May 1933; Nowy Sącz, Poland
- Died: 13 February 2015 (aged 81)

Sport
- Sport: Bobsleigh

Aleksander Habela (10 May 1933 – 13 February 2015) was a Polish bobsledder. He competed in the two-man and the four-man events at the 1956 Winter Olympics.

Habela died on 13 February 2015, at the age of 81.
