= Ștefania Botcariu =

Romanian cross-country skier (born 1936)

Personal information
- Nationality: Romanian
- Born: 11 January 1936 (age 89); Bistrița, Romania

Sport
- Sport: Cross-country skiing

Ștefania Botcariu (born 11 January 1936) is a Romanian cross-country skier. She competed in the women's 10 kilometres and the women's 3 × 5 kilometre relay events at the 1956 Winter Olympics.
