= Erich Kull =

Swiss speed skater 1932–1985

Personal information
- Full name: Erich Rolf Adolf Kull
- Nationality: Swiss
- Born: 6 January 1932
- Died: 9 January 1985 (aged 53)

Sport
- Sport: Speed skating

Erich Kull (6 January 1932 – 9 January 1985) was a Swiss speed skater. He competed in two events at the 1956 Winter Olympics.
