= Renato Mocellini =

Italian bobsledder (1929–1985)

Medal record

Men's Bobsleigh

Representing Italy

Olympic Games
Silver medal – second place	1956 Cortina d'Ampezzo	Four-man

World Championships
Gold medal – first place	1963 Igls	Four-man
Bronze medal – third place	1958 Garmisch-Partenkirchen	Four-man

Renato Mocellini (2 April 1929 – 8 November 1985) was an Italian bobsledder who competed from the mid-1950s to the mid-1960s. He won a silver medal in the four-man event at the 1956 Winter Olympics in Cortina d'Ampezzo.

Mocellini also won two medals in the four-man event at the FIBT World Championships with a gold in 1963 and a bronze in 1958.
