= Ion Staicu =

Romanian bobsledder (1927–1967)

Personal information
- Nationality: Romanian
- Born: 3 November 1927
- Died: 1967

Sport
- Sport: Bobsleigh

Ion Staicu (3 November 1927 – 1967) was a Romanian bobsledder. He competed in the four-man event at the 1956 Winter Olympics.
