= Edmund Koller =

German bobsledder

Medal record

Men's Bobsleigh

Representing West Germany

World Championships
Bronze medal – third place	1955 St. Moritz	Four-man

Edmund Koller (23 August 1930 – 9 June 1998) was a West German bobsledder who competed in the mid-1950s. He won a bronze medal in the four-man event at the 1955 FIBT World Championships in St. Moritz. Koller also finished eighth in the four-man event at the 1956 Winter Olympics in Cortina d'Ampezzo.
