= Jan Dombrowski =

Polish bobsledder (1926–1992)

Personal information
- Nationality: Polish
- Born: 26 May 1926; Przemyśl, Poland
- Died: 24 February 1992 (aged 65); Krynica-Zdrój, Poland

Sport
- Sport: Bobsleigh

Jan Dombrowski (26 May 1926 – 24 February 1992) was a Polish bobsledder. He competed in the four-man event at the 1956 Winter Olympics.
