= Lamberto Dalla Costa =

Italian bobsleigher (1920–1982)

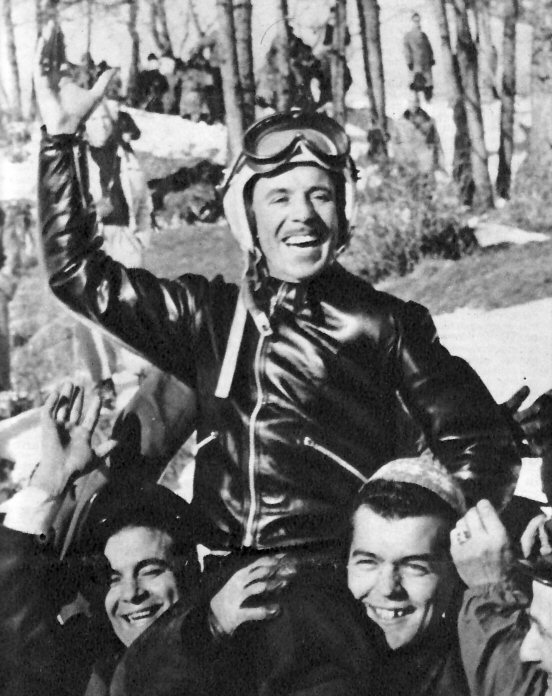

Personal information
- Born: 14 April 1920
- Died: 1982 (aged 61–62)
Medal record
Bobsleigh
Representing Italy
Gold medal – first place	1956 Cortina d'Ampezzo	Two-man

Lamberto dalla Costa (April 14, 1920 – 1982) was an Italian bobsleigher who competed in the late 1950s. He won the gold medal in the two-man event at the 1956 Winter Olympics in Cortina d'Ampezzo.

== Biography ==
Dalla Costa was a jet pilot by trade who competed only on the Cortina track in his spare time.
