= Aleksy Konieczny =

Polish bobsledder

Personal information
- Nationality: Polish
- Born: 11 July 1925; Leszno, Poland

Sport
- Sport: Bobsleigh

Aleksy Konieczny (born 11 July 1925) was a Polish bobsledder. He competed in the two-man and the four-man events at the 1956 Winter Olympics.
