= Dumitru Peteu =

Romanian bobsledder

Personal information
- Nationality: Romanian
- Born: 19 October 1913
- Died: 26 September 1963 (aged 49)

Sport
- Sport: Bobsleigh

Dumitru Peteu (19 October 1913 – 26 September 1963) was a Romanian bobsledder. He competed in the four-man event at the 1956 Winter Olympics.
