= Zbigniew Skowroński =

Polish bobsledder

Personal information
- Nationality: Polish
- Born: 21 September 1925; Przemyśl, Poland
- Died: 24 February 1992 (aged 66); Krynica-Zdrój, Poland

Sport
- Sport: Bobsleigh

Zbigniew Skowroński (21 September 1925 – 24 February 1992) was a Polish bobsledder. He competed in the two-man and the four-man events at the 1956 Winter Olympics.
