= Heinrich Enea =

Romanian bobsledder (1921–2003)

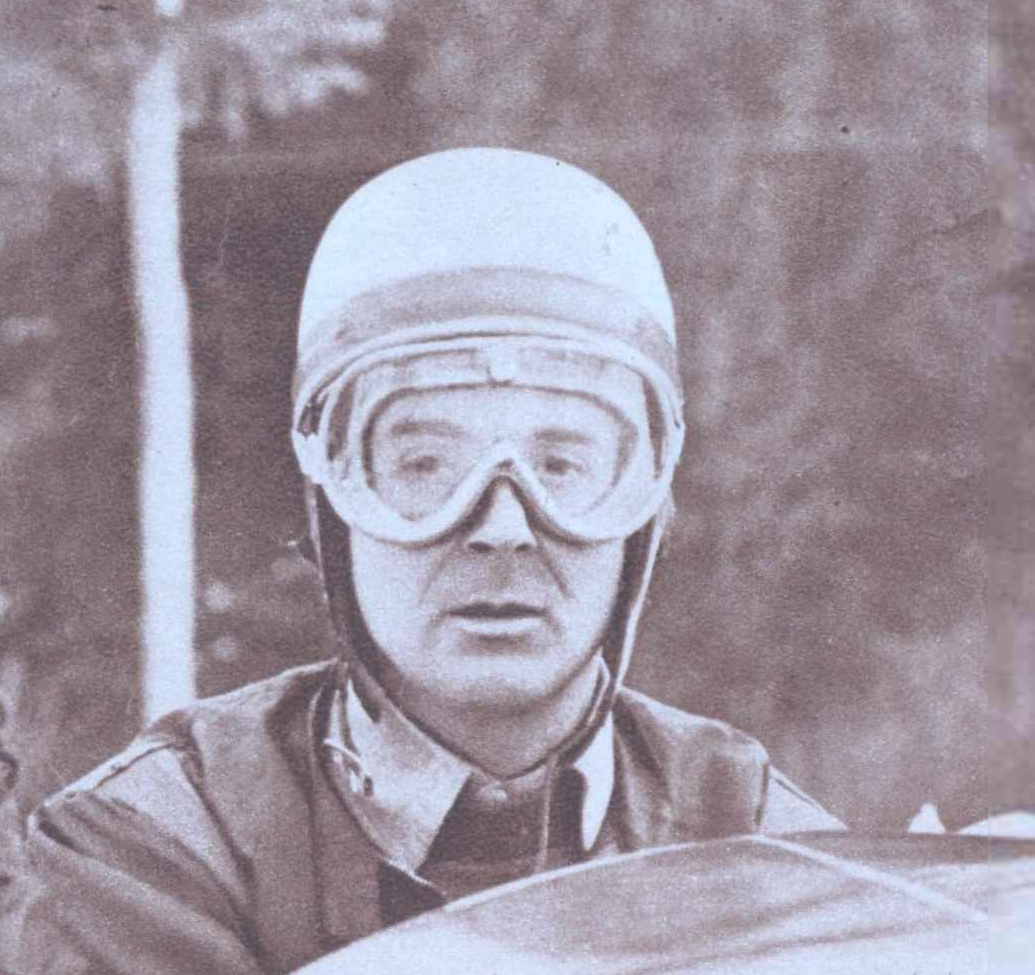
- Heinrich Enea in 1963

Personal information
- Nationality: Romanian
- Born: 18 December 1921 Bucharest, Romania
- Died: 3 December 2003 (aged 81)

Sport
- Sport: Bobsleigh

Heinrich Enea (18 December 1921 – 3 December 2003) was a Romanian bobsledder. He competed in the two-man and the four-man events at the 1956 Winter Olympics. Enea died on 3 December 2003, at the age of 81.
