= Constantin Dragomir =

Romanian bobsledder

Personal information
- Nationality: Romanian
- Born: 14 May 1927; Comarnic, Romania

Sport
- Sport: Bobsleigh

Constantin Dragomir (born 14 May 1927) was a Romanian bobsledder. He competed in the two-man and the four-man events at the 1956 Winter Olympics.
