= Jürg Rohrbach =

Swiss speed skater

Jürg Adrian Rohrbach
Personal information
- Nationality: Swiss
- Born: 16 July 1931; Davos, Switzerland

Sport
- Sport: Speed skating

Jürg Rohrbach (born 16 July 1931) is a Swiss former speed skater. He competed in two events at the 1956 Winter Olympics.
