= André Huguenin =

Swiss cross-country skier

Personal information
- Nationality: Swiss
- Born: 12 March 1929
- Died: 11 December 2007 (aged 78)

Sport
- Sport: Cross-country skiing

André Huguenin (12 March 1929 – 11 December 2007) was a Swiss cross-country skier. He competed in the men's 30 kilometre event at the 1956 Winter Olympics.
