= Adolf Wróbel =

Polish ice hockey player (1932–2012)

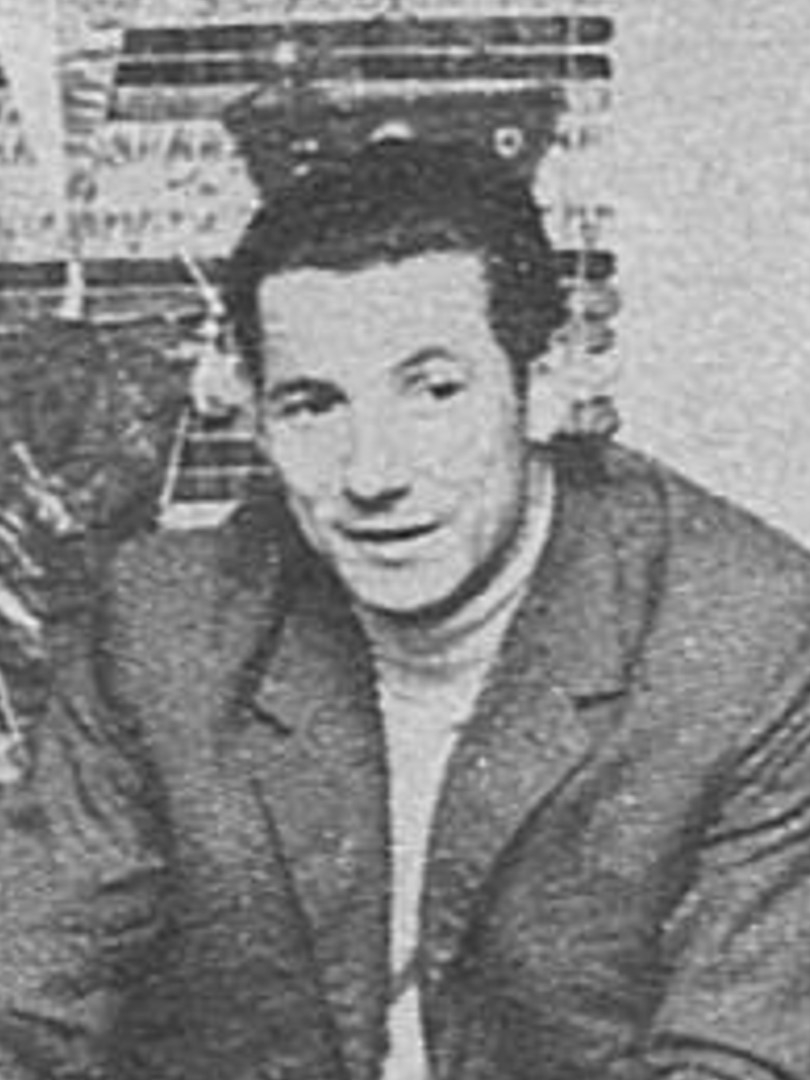
- Born: 19 October 1932 Katowice, Poland
- Died: 14 January 2012 (aged 79) Eislingen, Germany
- Position: Left wing
- Played for: Górnik Katowice; Legia Warsaw; GKS Katowice
- National team: Poland
- Playing career: 1946–1965

Adolf Wróbel (19 October 1932 – 14 January 2012) was a Polish ice hockey player. He played for Górnik Katowice, Legia Warsaw, and GKS Katowice during his career. He also played for the Polish national team at the 1956 Winter Olympics and the 1955 World Championship. Two of his brothers, Alfred and Antoni, also played for Poland at the Olympics; Alfred in both 1952 and 1956, and Antoni in 1952. Adolf Wróbel died in Eislingen, Germany, on 14 January 2012, at the age of 79.
