= Rolf Küderli =

Swiss bobsledder

Medal record

Bobsleigh

World Championships
Gold medal – first place	1957 St. Moritz	Four-man

Rolf Küderli (sometimes shown as Rolf Kuederli) was a Swiss bobsledder who competed in the mid-1950s. He won a gold medal in the four-man event at the 1957 FIBT World Championships in St. Moritz.
