= Hans Zoller =

Swiss bobsledder (1922–2020)

Medal record

Bobsleigh

World Championships
Gold medal – first place	1957 St. Moritz	Four-man

Hans Zoller (16 February 1922 – 11 September 2020) was a Swiss bobsledder who competed in the 1950s and 1960s. He won a gold medal in the four-man event at the 1957 FIBT World Championships in St. Moritz. He also competed in Bobsleigh at the 1964 Winter Olympics, where he finished 10th in both the two man and four man bobsled events.
