= Giovanni Tabacchi =

Italian bobsledder (1931–2018)

Giovanni Tabacchi (8 July 1931 – 2 September 2018) was an Italian bobsledder who competed in the late 1950s. He finished fifth in the four-man event at the 1956 Winter Olympics in Cortina d'Ampezzo. He was born in Belluno.

Tabacchi died on 2 September 2018 in Florence, aged 87.
