= Stefan Ciapała =

Polish bobsledder (1922–1989)

Personal information
- Nationality: Polish
- Born: 12 September 1922; Zakopane, Poland
- Died: 22 August 1989 (aged 66)

Sport
- Sport: Bobsleigh

Stefan Ciapała (12 September 1922 – 22 August 1989) was a Polish bobsledder. He competed in the two-man and the four-man events at the 1956 Winter Olympics.
