= Rolf Gerber =

Swiss bobsledder (1930–2024)

Medal record

Bobsleigh

World Championships
Silver medal – second place	1955 St. Moritz	Four-man

Rolf Gerber (25 July 1930 – 8 January 2024) was a Swiss bobsledder who competed in the mid-1950s. He won a silver medal in the four-man event at the 1955 FIBT World Championships in St. Moritz. Gerber also finished fourth in the four-man event at the 1956 Winter Olympics in Cortina d'Ampezzo. He died in Basel on 8 January 2024, at the age of 93.

== Sources ==
- Bobsleigh four-man world championship medalists since 1930
- Wallenchinsky, David. (1984). "Bobsled: Four-man". In The Complete Book of the Olympics: 1896-1980. New York: Penguin Books. p. 561.
- Rolf Gerber at Olympedia
