= Jerzy Olesiak =

Polish bobsledder

Personal information
- Nationality: Polish
- Born: 18 January 1930; Nowy Sącz, Poland
- Died: October 2012

Sport
- Sport: Bobsleigh

Jerzy Olesiak (18 January 1930 – October 2012) was a Polish bobsledder. He competed in the four-man event at the 1956 Winter Olympics.
