= Antoni Wróbel =

Polish ice hockey player

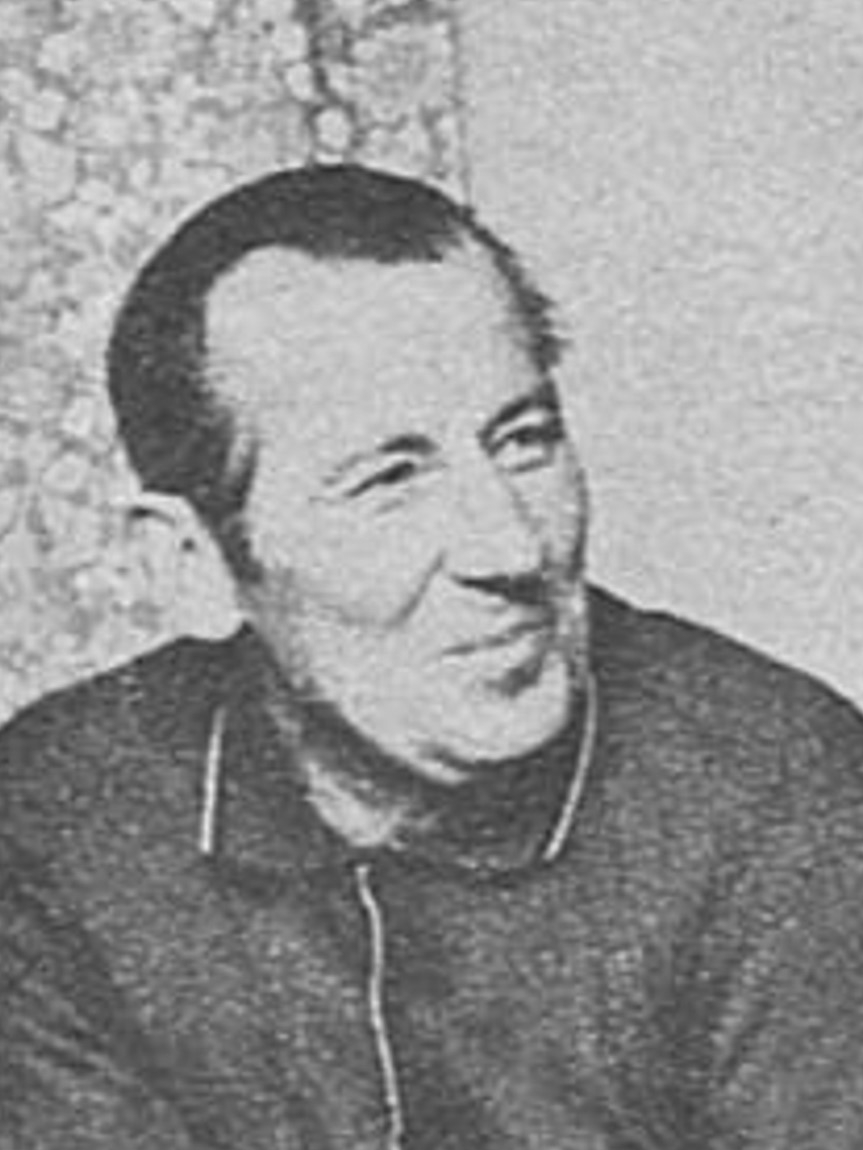
- Born: February 11, 1923 Katowice, Poland
- Died: August 2, 1988 (aged 65) Katowice, Poland
- Position: Left wing
- Played for: Naprzód Janów
- National team: Poland
- Playing career: 1951–1952

Antoni Wróbel (11 February 1923 – 2 August 1988) was a Polish ice hockey player. He played for Naprzód Janów during his career. He also played for the Polish national team at the 1952 Winter Olympics. Two of his brothers, Adolf and Alfred, also played for Poland at the Olympics; Adolf in 1956, and Alfred in both 1952 and 1956.
