= Teresa Kodelska =

Polish alpine skier (1929–2021)

Personal information
- Nationality: Polish
- Born: 13 January 1929; Warsaw, Poland
- Died: 17 November 2021 (aged 92); Warsaw, Poland

Sport
- Sport: Alpine skiing

Teresa Kodelska (13 January 1929 – 17 November 2021) was a Polish alpine skier. She competed in three events at the 1952 Winter Olympics. Kodelska died on 17 November 2021, at the age of 92.
