= Hans Henn =

West German bobsledder

Medal record

Men's Bobsleigh

Representing West Germany

World Championships
Bronze medal – third place	1955 St. Moritz	Four-man

Hans Henn (19 December 1926 – 14 August 1993) was a West German bobsledder who competed in the mid-1950s. He won a bronze medal in the four-man event at the 1955 FIBT World Championships in St. Moritz. Henn also finished eighth in the four-man event at the 1956 Winter Olympics in Cortina d'Ampezzo. He was born in Grimmelshausen and died in Garmisch-Partenkirchen.
