= Ulrico Girardi =

Italian bobsledder (1930–1986)

Olympic medal record

Bobsleigh

Representing Italy
| Silver medal – second place | 1956 Cortina d'Ampezzo | Four-man |

Ulrico Girardi (3 July 1930 in Cortina d'Ampezzo – 18 December 1986) was an Italian bobsledder who competed in the mid-1950s. He won a silver medal in the four-man event at the 1956 Winter Olympics in Cortina d'Ampezzo.
