= Pierre Bouvier (bobsleigh) =

French bobsledder

Personal information
- Nationality: French
- Born: 14 April 1934; Chambéry, France
- Died: 27 July 2003 (aged 69); Saint-Champ, France

Sport
- Sport: Bobsleigh

Pierre Bouvier (14 April 1934 – 27 July 2003) was a French bobsledder. He competed in the four-man event at the 1956 Winter Olympics.
