= Maria Gąsienica Bukowa-Kowalska =

Polish cross-country skier (1936–2020)

Personal information
- Nationality: Polish
- Born: 2 January 1936 Kościelisko, Poland
- Died: 27 December 2020 (aged 84)
- Height: 165 cm (5 ft 5 in)
- Spouse: Aleksander Kowalski
- Relative: Maria Kowalska (sister-in-law)

Sport
- Sport: Cross-country skiing

Maria Gąsienica Bukowa-Kowalska (2 January 1936 – 27 December 2020) was a Polish cross-country skier. She competed in the women's 10 km and the women's 3 × 5 km relay events at the 1956 Winter Olympics. She was married to Aleksander Kowalski and was the sister-in-law of Maria Kowalska.

== Cross-country skiing results ==
=== Olympic Games ===
Year	Age	10 km	3 × 5 km relay
1956	20	16	5

=== World Championships ===
Year	Age	10 km	3 × 5 km relay
1958	22	21	4
