= Charles Thomas Butler =

American bobsledder (born 1932)

Medal record

Men's Bobsleigh

Representing United States

Olympic Games
Bronze medal – third place	1956 Cortina d'Ampezzo	Four-man

World Championships
Gold medal – first place	1959 St. Moritz	Four-man
Silver medal – second place	1957 St. Moritz	Two-man
Bronze medal – third place	1957 St. Moritz	Four-man
Bronze medal – third place	1959 St. Moritz	Two-man

Charles Thomas Butler (born June 11, 1932) is a former American bobsledder who competed in the 1950s. He won a bronze medal in the four-man event at the 1956 Winter Olympics in Cortina d'Ampezzo, a gold in the 1959 World Championships, and three other medals at the World Championships.

Butler is a 1955 graduate of Brown University.
