= Stefan Dziedzic =

Polish skier (1927–2006)

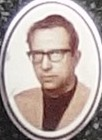

Personal information
- Nationality: Polish
- Born: 15 October 1927; Zakopane, Poland
- Died: 30 July 2006 (aged 78); Zakopane, Poland

Sport
- Sport: Skiing

Stefan Dziedzic (15 October 1927 – 30 July 2006) was a Polish skier. He competed at the 1948 Winter Olympics and the 1952 Winter Olympics.
