= FIBT World Championships 1955 =

Winter sport competition

1955 World Championships
- Location: St. Moritz, Switzerland

The FIBT World Championships 1955 took place in St. Moritz, Switzerland for the record seventh time. The Swiss city had hosted the event previously in 1931 (Four-man), 1935 (Four-man), 1937 (Four-man), 1938 (Two-man), 1939 (Two-man), and 1947.

== Two man bobsleigh ==
Pos	Team	Time
Gold	Switzerland (Fritz Feierabend, Harry Warburton)	
Silver	Austria (Paul Aste, Pepi Isser)	
Bronze	Switzerland (Franz Kapus, Heinrich Angst)	

== Four man bobsleigh ==
Pos	Team	Time
Gold	Switzerland (Franz Kapus, Gottfried Diener, Robert Alt, Heinrich Angst)	
Silver	Switzerland (Fritz Feierabend, Aby Gartmann, Harry Warburton, Rolf Gerber)	
Bronze	West Germany (Franz Schelle, Jakob Nirschl, Hans Henn, Edmund Koller)	

== Medal table ==
Rank	Nation	Gold	Silver	Bronze	Total
1	Switzerland (SUI)	2	1	1	4
2	Austria (AUT)	0	1	0	1
3	West Germany (FRG)	0	0	1	1
Totals (3 entries)		2	2	2	6
