= James Lamy =

American bobsledder

Olympic medal record

Men's Bobsleigh

Representing United States
Bronze medal – third place	1956 Cortina d'Ampezzo	Four-man

James Ernest Lamy (May 30, 1928 – May 30, 1992) was an American bobsledder who competed in the mid-1950s. He won a bronze medal in the four-man event at the 1956 Winter Olympics in Cortina d'Ampezzo.
