= Jan Płonka =

Polish alpine skier (1920–2003)

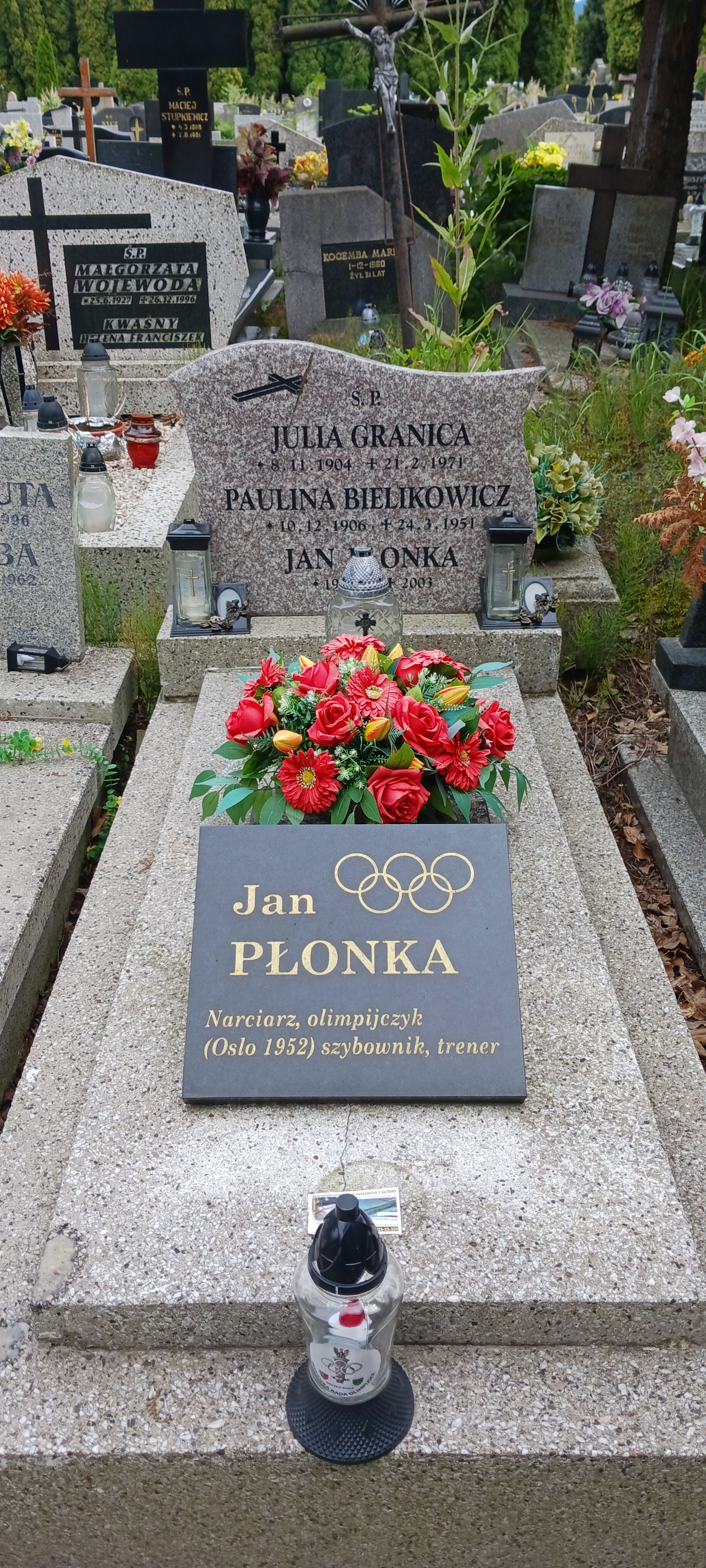

Personal information
- Nationality: Polish
- Born: 24 September 1920; Kamienica, Poland
- Died: 8 February 2003 (aged 82); Bielsko-Biała, Poland

Sport
- Sport: Alpine skiing

Jan Płonka (24 September 1920 – 8 February 2003) was a Polish alpine skier. He competed in two events at the 1952 Winter Olympics.
