= Jakob Nirschl =

German bobsledder

Medal record

Men's Bobsleigh

Representing West Germany

World Championships
| Bronze medal – third place | 1955 St. Moritz | Four-man |

Jakob Nirschl, sometimes shown as Jakob Nirschel (April 23, 1925 – June 11, 1997) was a West German bobsledder who competed in the mid-1950s. He won a bronze medal in the four-man event at the 1955 FIBT World Championships in St. Moritz. Nirschl also finished eighth in the four-man event at the 1956 Winter Olympics in Cortina d'Ampezzo.
