= Józef Szymański =

Polish bobsledder

Personal information
- Nationality: Polish
- Born: 31 January 1926 Besko, Poland
- Died: 24 August 2016 (aged 90) Nowy Sącz, Poland

Sport
- Sport: Bobsleigh

Józef Szymański (31 January 1926 – 24 August 2016) was a Polish bobsledder. He competed in the four-man event at the 1956 Winter Olympics.
