= Gheorghe Moldoveanu =

Romanian bobsledder (born 1916)

Personal information
- Nationality: Romanian
- Born: 4 May 1916; Bucharest, Romania

Sport
- Sport: Bobsleigh

Gheorghe Moldoveanu (born 4 May 1916, date of death unknown) was a Romanian bobsledder. He competed in the two-man and the four-man events at the 1956 Winter Olympics. Moldoveanu is deceased.
