= Hedi Beeler =

Swiss alpine skier (born 1931)

Personal information
- Nationality: Swiss
- Born: 20 November 1931 (age 93); Stoos, Switzerland

Sport
- Sport: Alpine skiing

Hedi Beeler (born 20 November 1931) is a Swiss alpine skier. She competed in three events at the 1956 Winter Olympics.
