= Vasile Panait =

Romanian bobsledder

Personal information
- Nationality: Romanian
- Born: 1 July 1919

Sport
- Sport: Bobsleigh

Vasile Panait (born 1 July 1919, date of death unknown) was a Romanian bobsledder. He competed in the four-man event at the 1956 Winter Olympics.
