= Giacomo Conti (bobsledder) =

Italian bobsledder (1918–1992)

Olympic medal record

Bobsleigh

Representing Italy
Gold medal – first place	1956 Cortina d'Ampezzo	Two-man

Giacomo Conti (24 June 1918 – 8 July 1992) was an Italian bobsledder who competed in the late 1950s. He won the gold medal in the two-man event at the 1956 Winter Olympics in Cortina d'Ampezzo.
