= Nicolae Moiceanu =

Romanian bobsledder

Personal information
- Nationality: Romanian
- Born: 6 December 1927

Sport
- Sport: Bobsleigh

Nicolae Moiceanu (born 6 December 1927) was a Romanian bobsledder. He competed in the four-man event at the 1956 Winter Olympics.
