= Zygmunt Konieczny (bobsleigh) =

Polish bobsledder

Zygmunt Konieczny (19 April 1927 – 7 July 2003) was a Polish bobsledder who competed in the 1956 Winter Olympics. He was born in Leszno.
