= Robert Alt =

Swiss bobsledder (1927–2017)

Medal record

Men's Bobsleigh

Representing Switzerland

Olympic Games
Gold medal – first place	1956 Cortina d'Ampezzo	Four-man

World Championships
Gold medal – first place	1955 St. Moritz	Four-man

Robert Alt (2 January 1927 – 4 December 2017) was a Swiss bobsledder who competed in the mid-1950s. He won a gold medal in the four-man event at the 1956 Winter Olympics in Cortina d'Ampezzo. Alt also won a gold medal in the four-man event at the 1955 FIBT World Championships in St. Moritz.
