= Gunnar Åhs =

Swedish bobsledder (1915–1994)

Medal record

Men's Bobsleigh

World Championships
Bronze medal – third place	1961 Lake Placid	Four-man

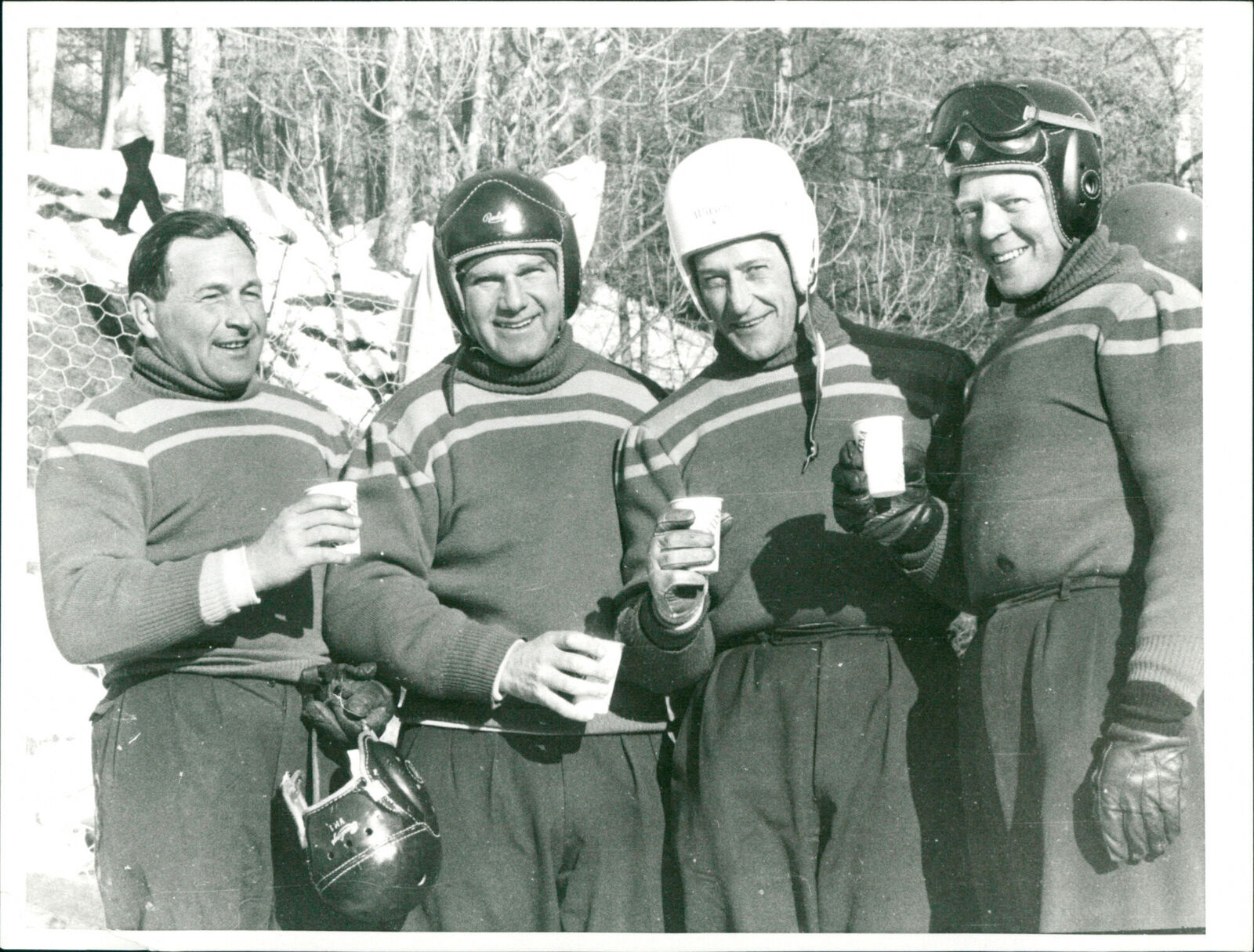
Olympics in Cortina. The Swedish four-man bobsleigh team strengthens its side with a cup of hot chocolate after the races. From left: Gunnar Åhs, Ebbe Wallén, Sune Skagerling and Olle Axelsson.

Gunnar Johan Åhs (5 September 1915, Uppsala – 6 May 1994) was a Swedish bobsledder who competed from the early 1950s to the early 1960s. He won a bronze medal in the four-man event at the 1961 FIBT World Championships in Lake Placid, New York.

Competing in two Winter Olympics, Åhs earned his best finish of seventh in the four-man event at Oslo in 1952.

Four years later he finished 16th in the four-man event at the 1956 Winter Olympics.

He was born in Uppsala and died in Johanneshov.
