= Gottfried Diener =

Swiss bobsledder (1926–2015)

Medal record

Men's Bobsleigh

Representing Switzerland

Olympic Games
Gold medal – first place	1956 Cortina d'Ampezzo	Four-man

World Championships
Gold medal – first place	1954 Cortina d'Ampezzo	Four-man
Gold medal – first place	1955 St. Moritz	Four-man

Gottfried Diener (1 November 1926 – 26 May 2015) was a Swiss bobsleigher who competed in the mid-1950s. He won the gold medal in the four-man event at the 1956 Winter Olympics in Cortina d'Ampezzo. Diener also won two gold medals in the four-man event at the FIBT World Championships, winning them in 1954 and 1955. He also served as president of the International Crossbow Shooting Union from 1965 to 1999. Diener was named an honorary president of the organization in 2006.
