= Barbara Grocholska =

Polish alpine skier

Personal information
- Nationality: Polish
- Born: 24 August 1927 (age 97); Warsaw, Poland

Sport
- Sport: Alpine skiing

Barbara Zofia Grocholska (born 24 August 1927) is a Polish alpine skier. She competed at the 1952 Winter Olympics and the 1956 Winter Olympics.
