= Maria Kowalska =

Polish alpine skier

Personal information
- Nationality: Polish
- Born: 19 May 1929 (age 95); Zakopane, Poland
- Relatives: Aleksander Kowalski (brother); Maria Gąsienica Bukowa-Kowalska (sister-in-law)

Sport
- Sport: Alpine skiing

Maria Kowalska (born 19 May 1929) is a Polish alpine skier. She competed at the 1952 Winter Olympics and the 1956 Winter Olympics. Her brother was Aleksander Kowalski and her sister-in-law was Maria Gąsienica Bukowa-Kowalska.
