= Aby Gartmann =

Swiss bobsledder (1930–2018)

Medal record

Men's bobsleigh

Representing Switzerland

World Championships
Silver medal – second place	1955 St. Moritz	Four-man

Albert "Aby" Gartmann (April 23, 1930 - April 6, 2018) was a Swiss bobsledder who competed in the mid-1950s. He won a silver medal in the four-man event at the 1955 FIBT World Championships in St. Moritz.

Gartmann also finished fourth in the four-man event at the 1956 Winter Olympics in Cortina d'Ampezzo.
