= Alfred Wróbel =

Polish ice hockey player

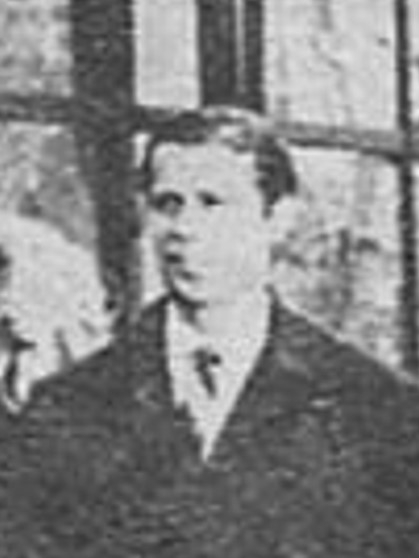
- Born: November 29, 1927 Katowice, Poland
- Died: September 24, 1993 (aged 65) Katowice, Poland
- Position: Right wing
- Played for: Górnik Katowice; GKS Katowice
- National team: Poland
- Playing career: 1951–1959

Alfred Wróbel (29 November 1927 – 24 September 1993) was a Polish ice hockey player. He played for Górnik Katowice and GKS Katowice during his career. He also played for the Polish national team at the 1952 and 1956 Winter Olympics. Two of his brothers, Adolf and Antoni, also played for Poland at the Olympics; Adolf in 1956, and Antoni in 1952.
