= Aleksander Kowalski (skier) =

Polish Nordic combined skier

Personal information
- Nationality: Polish
- Born: 20 July 1930; Zakopane, Poland
- Died: February 2009 (aged 78); Kościelisko, Poland
- Spouse: Maria Gąsienica Bukowa-Kowalska
- Relative: Maria Kowalska (sister)

Sport
- Sport: Nordic combined

Aleksander Kowalski (20 July 1930 – February 2009) was a Polish skier. He competed in the Nordic combined event at the 1956 Winter Olympics. He was the brother of Maria Kowalska and the husband of Maria Gąsienica Bukowa-Kowalska.
