= Nicolae Pandrea =

Romanian alpine skier (born 1933)

Niculae Pandrea
Personal information
- Nationality: Romanian
- Born: 8 October 1933 (age 91)

Sport
- Sport: Alpine skiing

Niculae Pandrea (born 8 October 1933) is a Romanian alpine skier. He competed in three events at the 1956 Winter Olympics.
