= Andrzej Gąsienica Roj =

Polish alpine skier (1930–1989)

Personal information
- Nationality: Polish
- Born: 30 November 1930; Zakopane, Poland
- Died: 15 November 1989 (aged 58); Zakopane, Poland

Sport
- Sport: Alpine skiing

Andrzej Gąsienica Roj (30 November 1930 – 15 November 1989) was a Polish alpine skier. He competed at the 1952 Winter Olympics and the 1956 Winter Olympics.
