= Mieczysław Chmura =

Polish ice hockey player

- Born: January 1, 1934; Nowy Targ, Poland
- Died: April 9, 1980 (aged 46); Sosnowiec, Poland
- Height: 5 ft 8 in (173 cm)
- Weight: 161 lb (73 kg; 11 st 7 lb)
- Position: Defence
- Played for: Podhale Nowy Targ
- National team: Poland
- Playing career: 1955–1964

Mieczysław Stefan Chmura (1 January 1934 – 9 April 1980), was a Polish ice hockey player, who played as a defenceman. He played for Podhale Nowy Targ during his career. He also played for the Polish national team at the 1956 Winter Olympics, and the 1959 World Championship. After his playing career he turned to coaching.

He died of an embolism at age 46, just before the club he coached at the time - Zagłębie Sosnowiec - won its first league title.
