= Harry Warburton =

Swiss bobsledder (1921–2005)

Medal record

Bobsleigh

Representing Switzerland

Olympic Games
| Bronze medal – third place | 1956 Cortina d'Ampezzo | Two-man |

World Championships
| Gold medal – first place | 1954 Cortina d'Ampezzo | Four-man |
| Gold medal – first place | 1955 St. Moritz | Two-man |
| Silver medal – second place | 1955 St. Moritz | Four-man |

Harry Warburton (April 10, 1921 – May 1, 2005) was a Swiss bobsledder who competed in the mid-1950s. He won the bronze in the two-man event at the 1956 Winter Olympics in Cortina d'Ampezzo.

Warburton also won three medals at the FIBT World Championships with two golds (Two-man: 1955, Four-man: 1954) and one silver (Four-man: 1955).
