= Józef Marusarz =

Polish alpine skier (1926–1996)

Personal information
- Nationality: Polish
- Born: 25 January 1926; Zakopane, Poland
- Died: 3 April 1996 (aged 70); Zakopane, Poland

Sport
- Sport: Alpine skiing

Józef Marusarz (25 January 1926 – 3 April 1996) was a Polish alpine skier. He competed at the 1948, 1952 and the 1956 Winter Olympics.
