= Mărgărit Blăgescu =

Romanian bobsledder

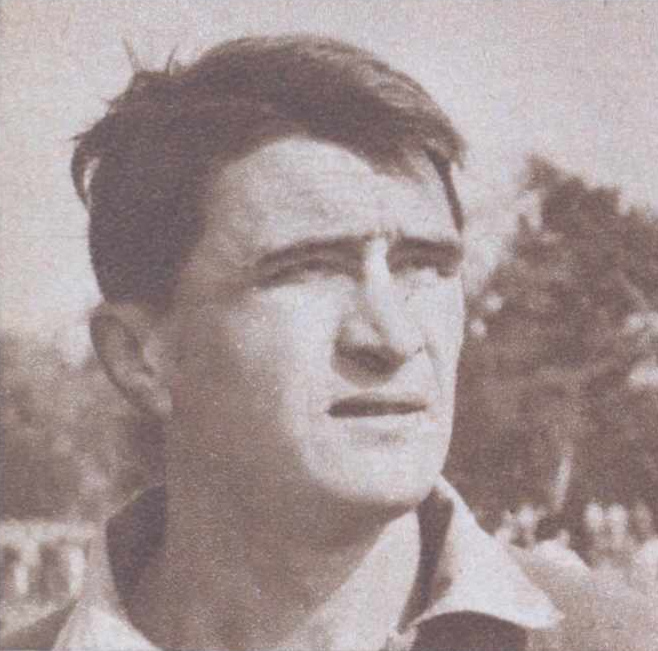

Mărgărit Blăgescu (26 August 1925 – March 2004) was a Romanian sportsman who competed as a bobsledder at the 1956 Winter Olympics. He played as a prop for the Romania national rugby union team during the 1950s.
