= Olle Axelsson =

Swedish bobsledder (1913–1980)

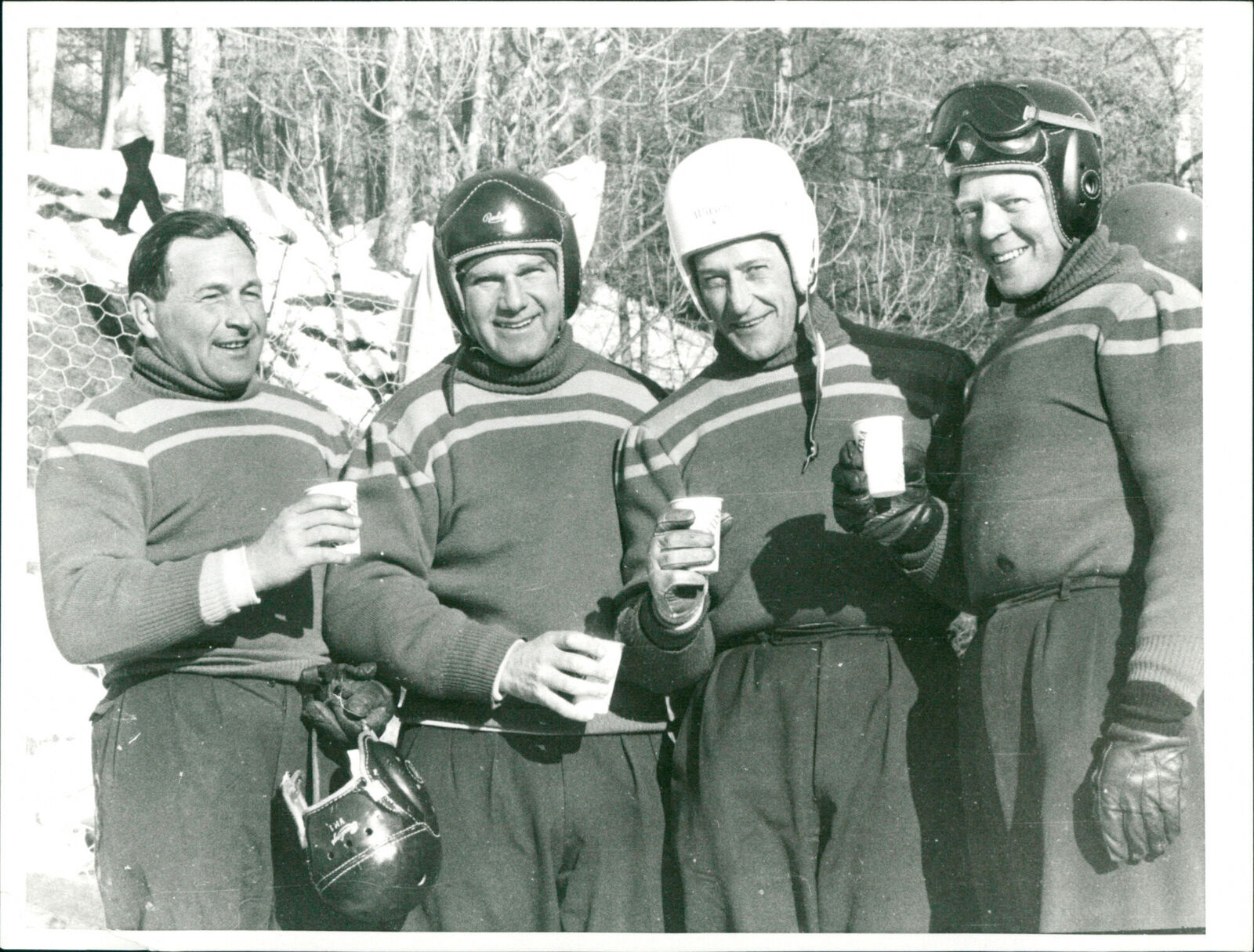
Olympics in Cortina. The Swedish four-man bobsleigh team strengthens its side with a cup of hot chocolate after the races. From left: Gunnar Åhs, Ebbe Wallén, Sune Skagerling and Olle Axelsson.

Olle Oskar Axelsson (December 1, 1913 – September 15, 1980) was a Swedish bobsledder who competed in the 1950s. Competing in two Winter Olympics, he earned his best finish of eighth in the two-man event at Oslo in 1952.

Four years later he finished 16th in the four-man event as well as 17th in the two-man event at the 1956 Winter Olympics.

He was born and died in Stockholm.
