= Max Angst =

Swiss bobsledder (1921–2002)

Medal record

Bobsleigh

Representing Switzerland

Olympic Games
Bronze medal – third place	1956 Cortina d'Ampezzo	Two-man

World Championships
Bronze medal – third place	1960 Cortina d'Ampezzo	Four-man

Max Angst (July 3, 1921 – January 21, 2002) was a Swiss bobsledder who competed in the late 1950s. He won the bronze medal in the two-man event at the 1956 Winter Olympics in Cortina d'Ampezzo.

Angst also won a bronze medal in the four-man event at the 1960 FIBT World Championships in Cortina d'Ampezzo.
