= Arthur Tyler (bobsleigh) =

American bobsledder

Medal record

Men's bobsleigh

Representing United States

Olympic Games
Bronze medal – third place	1956 Cortina d'Ampezzo	Four-man

World Championships
Gold medal – first place	1959 St. Moritz	Four-man
Silver medal – second place	1957 St. Moritz	Two-man
Bronze medal – third place	1957 St. Moritz	Four-man
Bronze medal – third place	1959 St. Moritz	Two-man

Arthur Walter Tyler (July 26, 1915 – August 23, 2008) was an American bobsledder who competed in the late 1950s. He won a bronze medal in the four-man event at the 1956 Winter Olympics in Cortina d'Ampezzo.

Tyler also won four medals at the FIBT World Championships with one gold (Four-man: 1959), one silver (1957), and two bronzes (Two-man: 1959, Four-man: 1957).
