= 1949–50 Polska Liga Hokejowa season =

Polish ice hockey season

The 1949–50 Polska Liga Hokejowa season was the 15th season of the Polska Liga Hokejowa, the top level of ice hockey in Poland. Four teams participated in the final round, and KTH Krynica won the championship.

== Qualification ==
=== First round ===
- Stal Siemianowice - Kolejarz Torun 2:7

=== Semifinal ===
- Kolejarz Torun - Piast Cieszyn 3:2/5:2

== Final Tournament ==
	Club	GP	W	T	L	Goals	Pts
1.	Górnik Janów	3	2	1	0	18:9	5
2.	KTH Krynica	3	2	1	0	16:7	5
3.	Kolejarz Torun	3	1	0	2	6:15	2
4.	Ogniwo Krakau	3	0	0	3	1:10	0

=== Final ===
- KTH Krynica - Górnik Janów 10:1
