= Ice hockey at the 1984 Winter Olympics – Rosters =

The ice hockey team rosters at the 1984 Winter Olympics consisted of the following players:

== Austria ==
Head coach: (Switzerland) Rudolf Killias

No.	Pos.	Name	Height	Weight	Birthdate	Team
12	F	Thomas Cijan	5 ft 10 in (178 cm)	165 lb (75 kg)	December 29, 1960 (aged 23)	(Austria) Klagenfurter AC
3	D	Richard Cunningham	5 ft 11 in (180 cm)	185 lb (84 kg)	March 3, 1951 (aged 32)	(Austria) Villacher SV
8	D	Konrad Dorn	6 ft 0 in (183 cm)	194 lb (88 kg)	October 29, 1962 (aged 21)	(Austria) VEU Feldkirch
2	D	Johann Fritz	6 ft 2 in (188 cm)	196 lb (89 kg)	February 6, 1958 (aged 26)	(Austria) Klagenfurter AC
13	F	Fritz Ganster	5 ft 8 in (173 cm)	172 lb (78 kg)	September 4, 1960 (aged 23)	(Austria) VEU Feldkirch
16	F	Kelvin Greenbank	6 ft 0 in (183 cm)	185 lb (84 kg)	November 17, 1955 (aged 28)	(Austria) VEU Feldkirch
22	F	Kurt Harand	6 ft 1 in (185 cm)	201 lb (91 kg)	September 11, 1957 (aged 26)	(Austria) Wiener EV
14	D	Bernard Hutz	5 ft 10 in (178 cm)	176 lb (80 kg)	April 30, 1961 (aged 22)	(Austria) Kapfenberger SV
5	F	Rudolf König (C)	6 ft 0 in (183 cm)	176 lb (80 kg)	April 25, 1957 (aged 26)	(Austria) Klagenfurter AC
6	F	Helmut Koren	5 ft 8 in (173 cm)	168 lb (76 kg)	March 30, 1958 (aged 25)	(Austria) Klagenfurter AC
11	F	Edward Lebler	5 ft 10 in (178 cm)	181 lb (82 kg)	May 20, 1958 (aged 25)	(Austria) Klagenfurter AC
4	D	Giuseppe Mion	5 ft 11 in (180 cm)	190 lb (86 kg)	April 9, 1959 (aged 24)	(Austria) Villacher SV
21	F	Helmut Petrik	6 ft 2 in (188 cm)	201 lb (91 kg)	May 16, 1961 (aged 22)	(Austria) Villacher SV
19	D	Martin Platzer	6 ft 2 in (188 cm)	194 lb (88 kg)	September 24, 1963 (aged 20)	(Austria) ECS Innsbruck
17	F	Herbert Pöck	5 ft 10 in (178 cm)	181 lb (82 kg)	March 8, 1957 (aged 26)	(Austria) Klagenfurter AC
15	F	Peter Raffl	6 ft 0 in (183 cm)	183 lb (83 kg)	February 2, 1960 (aged 24)	(Austria) Villacher SV
23	G	Michael Rudman	5 ft 11 in (180 cm)	181 lb (82 kg)	October 11, 1954 (aged 29)	(Austria) VEU Feldkirch
25	G	Brian Stankiewicz	5 ft 11 in (180 cm)	176 lb (80 kg)	June 20, 1956 (aged 27)	(Austria) WAT Stadlau
9	F	Krunoslav Sekulic	5 ft 11 in (180 cm)	185 lb (84 kg)	October 19, 1961 (aged 22)	(Austria) Villacher SV
18	F	Leopold Sivec	5 ft 9 in (175 cm)	181 lb (82 kg)	August 3, 1958 (aged 25)	(Austria) Villacher SV

== Canada ==
Head coach: Dave King

Assistant coaches: George Kingston, Jean Perron, Tom Watt

No.	Pos.	Name	Height	Weight	Birthdate	Team
1	G	Darren Eliot	6 ft 1 in (185 cm)	174 lb (79 kg)	November 26, 1961 (aged 22)	(United States) Cornell Big Red
2	D	Robin Bartel	6 ft 0 in (183 cm)	201 lb (91 kg)	May 16, 1961 (aged 22)	(Canada) Saskatchewan Huskies
3	D	Craig Redmond	5 ft 10 in (178 cm)	190 lb (86 kg)	September 22, 1965 (aged 18)	(United States) Denver Pioneers
4	D	Doug Lidster	6 ft 1 in (185 cm)	201 lb (91 kg)	October 18, 1960 (aged 23)	(United States) Colorado College Tigers
5	D	Warren Anderson (C)	5 ft 10 in (178 cm)	183 lb (83 kg)	April 13, 1952 (aged 31)	(Switzerland) Zürcher SC
8	F	Dave Tippett	5 ft 10 in (178 cm)	174 lb (79 kg)	August 25, 1961 (aged 22)	(United States) North Dakota Fighting Sioux
9	D	James Patrick	6 ft 2 in (188 cm)	201 lb (91 kg)	June 14, 1963 (aged 20)	(United States) North Dakota Fighting Sioux
14	F	Darren Lowe	5 ft 11 in (180 cm)	190 lb (86 kg)	October 13, 1960 (aged 23)	(Canada) Toronto Varsity Blues
15	D	Jean-Jacques Daigneault	5 ft 11 in (180 cm)	179 lb (81 kg)	October 12, 1965 (aged 18)	(Canada) Longueuil Chevaliers
16	F	Kevin Dineen	5 ft 11 in (180 cm)	190 lb (86 kg)	October 28, 1963 (aged 20)	(United States) Denver Pioneers
18	F	Russ Courtnall	5 ft 11 in (180 cm)	174 lb (79 kg)	January 2, 1965 (aged 19)	(Canada) Victoria Cougars
19	F	Dave Gagner	5 ft 11 in (180 cm)	187 lb (85 kg)	December 11, 1964 (aged 19)	(Canada) Brantford Alexanders
20	F	Carey Wilson	6 ft 2 in (188 cm)	194 lb (88 kg)	May 19, 1962 (aged 21)	(Finland) HIFK
22	F	Dan Wood	5 ft 11 in (180 cm)	190 lb (86 kg)	October 30, 1962 (aged 21)	(United States) Montana Magic
23	F	Dave Donnelly	5 ft 11 in (180 cm)	185 lb (84 kg)	February 2, 1962 (aged 22)	(United States) North Dakota Fighting Sioux
25	D	Bruce Driver	6 ft 0 in (183 cm)	185 lb (84 kg)	April 29, 1962 (aged 21)	(United States) Wisconsin Badgers
26	F	Patrick Flatley	6 ft 2 in (188 cm)	198 lb (90 kg)	October 3, 1963 (aged 20)	(United States) Wisconsin Badgers
27	F	Kirk Muller	6 ft 0 in (183 cm)	205 lb (93 kg)	February 8, 1966 (aged 17)	(Canada) Guelph Platers
31	F	Vaughn Karpan	6 ft 0 in (183 cm)	172 lb (78 kg)	June 20, 1961 (aged 22)	(Canada) Manitoba Bisons
33	G	Mario Gosselin	5 ft 8 in (173 cm)	161 lb (73 kg)	June 15, 1963 (aged 20)	(Canada) Shawinigan Cataractes

== Czechoslovakia ==
Head coach: Vladimír Kostka

No.	Pos.	Name	Height	Weight	Birthdate	Team
1	G	Jiří Králík	5 ft 9 in (175 cm)	165 lb (75 kg)	April 11, 1952 (aged 31)	(Czechoslovakia) TJ Gottwaldov
4	D	Miloslav Hořava	5 ft 11 in (180 cm)	192 lb (87 kg)	August 14, 1961 (aged 22)	(Czechoslovakia) ASD Dukla Jihlava
5	D	Milan Chalupa	5 ft 10 in (178 cm)	185 lb (84 kg)	July 4, 1953 (aged 30)	(Czechoslovakia) ASD Dukla Jihlava
7	D	Eduard Uvíra	6 ft 0 in (183 cm)	209 lb (95 kg)	July 12, 1961 (aged 22)	(Czechoslovakia) TJ Litvínov
8	D	Arnold Kadlec	6 ft 2 in (188 cm)	212 lb (96 kg)	January 8, 1959 (aged 25)	(Czechoslovakia) TJ Litvínov
9	D	Jaroslav Benák	6 ft 0 in (183 cm)	187 lb (85 kg)	April 3, 1962 (aged 21)	(Czechoslovakia) ASD Dukla Jihlava
11	F	Igor Liba	6 ft 0 in (183 cm)	198 lb (90 kg)	November 4, 1960 (aged 23)	(Czechoslovakia) ASD Dukla Jihlava
12	F	Pavel Richter	5 ft 9 in (175 cm)	172 lb (78 kg)	December 5, 1954 (aged 29)	(Czechoslovakia) TJ Sparta Praha
14	F	František Černík (C)	5 ft 10 in (178 cm)	190 lb (86 kg)	June 3, 1953 (aged 30)	(Czechoslovakia) TJ Vitkovice
15	D	Radoslav Svoboda	6 ft 0 in (183 cm)	183 lb (83 kg)	December 18, 1957 (aged 26)	(Czechoslovakia) ASD Dukla Jihlava
16	F	Vladimír Kýhos	6 ft 0 in (183 cm)	181 lb (82 kg)	June 23, 1956 (aged 27)	(Czechoslovakia) TJ Litvínov
17	F	Vladimír Růžička	6 ft 3 in (191 cm)	216 lb (98 kg)	June 6, 1963 (aged 20)	(Czechoslovakia) TJ Litvínov
18	F	Dárius Rusnák	6 ft 1 in (185 cm)	190 lb (86 kg)	December 2, 1959 (aged 24)	(Czechoslovakia) HC Slovan Bratislava
19	F	Vladimír Caldr	-	-	November 26, 1958 (aged 25)	(Czechoslovakia) TJ Motor Česke Budějovice
20	F	Jiří Lála	5 ft 10 in (178 cm)	181 lb (82 kg)	August 21, 1959 (aged 24)	(Czechoslovakia) TJ Motor Česke Budějovice
21	F	Dušan Pašek	6 ft 1 in (185 cm)	201 lb (91 kg)	July 9, 1960 (aged 23)	(Czechoslovakia) HC Slovan Bratislava
24	F	Jiří Hrdina	6 ft 0 in (183 cm)	194 lb (88 kg)	January 5, 1958 (aged 26)	(Czechoslovakia) TJ Sparta Praha
25	G	Jaromír Šindel	6 ft 1 in (185 cm)	190 lb (86 kg)	November 30, 1959 (aged 24)	(Czechoslovakia) ASD Dukla Jihlava
26	F	Jaroslav Korbela	6 ft 2 in (188 cm)	203 lb (92 kg)	May 25, 1957 (aged 26)	(Czechoslovakia) TJ Motor Česke Budějovice
29	F	Vincent Lukáč	5 ft 9 in (175 cm)	170 lb (77 kg)	February 14, 1954 (aged 29)	(Czechoslovakia) HC Košice

== Finland ==
Head coach: Alpo Suhonen

Assistant coach: Reino Ruotsalainen

No.	Pos.	Name	Height	Weight	Birthdate	Team
1	G	Kari Takko	6 ft 2 in (188 cm)	192 lb (87 kg)	June 23, 1962 (aged 21)	(Finland) Ässät
3	D	Markus Lehto	5 ft 9 in (175 cm)	187 lb (85 kg)	October 20, 1962 (aged 21)	(Finland) Jokerit
4	D	Pertti Lehtonen	6 ft 2 in (188 cm)	203 lb (92 kg)	October 18, 1956 (aged 27)	(Finland) HIFK
5	D	Simo Saarinen	5 ft 10 in (178 cm)	179 lb (81 kg)	February 14, 1963 (aged 20)	(Finland) HIFK
6	D	Arto Ruotanen	5 ft 11 in (180 cm)	183 lb (83 kg)	April 11, 1961 (aged 22)	(Finland) Kärpät
7	D	Timo Jutila	5 ft 10 in (178 cm)	187 lb (85 kg)	December 24, 1963 (aged 20)	(Finland) Tappara
8	D	Ville Sirén	6 ft 2 in (188 cm)	196 lb (89 kg)	February 11, 1964 (aged 19)	(Finland) Ilves
9	D	Petteri Lehto	6 ft 0 in (183 cm)	185 lb (84 kg)	March 13, 1961 (aged 22)	(Finland) TPS
11	F	Arto Javanainen	6 ft 0 in (183 cm)	190 lb (86 kg)	April 8, 1959 (aged 24)	(Finland) Ässät
13	F	Risto Jalo	5 ft 11 in (180 cm)	176 lb (80 kg)	July 18, 1962 (aged 21)	(Finland) Ilves
14	F	Petri Skriko	5 ft 10 in (178 cm)	172 lb (78 kg)	March 13, 1962 (aged 21)	(Finland) SaiPa
16	F	Arto Sirviö	5 ft 10 in (178 cm)	181 lb (82 kg)	January 6, 1962 (aged 22)	(Finland) Jokerit
17	F	Jarmo Mäkitalo	5 ft 9 in (175 cm)	165 lb (75 kg)	October 8, 1960 (aged 23)	(Sweden) Södertälje SK
19	G	Jorma Valtonen	5 ft 9 in (175 cm)	161 lb (73 kg)	December 22, 1946 (aged 37)	(Finland) TPS
20	F	Erkki Laine	5 ft 9 in (175 cm)	172 lb (78 kg)	September 13, 1957 (aged 26)	(Finland) Kiekkoriepas
21	F	Harri Tuohimaa	6 ft 1 in (185 cm)	181 lb (82 kg)	November 21, 1959 (aged 24)	(Finland) HIFK
23	F	Hannu Oksanen	5 ft 10 in (178 cm)	183 lb (83 kg)	November 15, 1957 (aged 26)	(Finland) Jokerit
24	F	Anssi Melametsä (C)	6 ft 0 in (183 cm)	194 lb (88 kg)	June 21, 1961 (aged 22)	(Finland) HIFK
25	F	Raimo Summanen	5 ft 11 in (180 cm)	196 lb (89 kg)	March 2, 1962 (aged 21)	(Finland) Ilves
28	F	Raimo Helminen	6 ft 0 in (183 cm)	194 lb (88 kg)	March 11, 1964 (aged 19)	(Finland) Ilves

== Italy ==
Head coach: (Canada) Ron Ivany

No.	Pos.	Name	Height	Weight	Birthdate	Team
3	D	Erwin Kostner	5 ft 8 in (173 cm)	159 lb (72 kg)	April 7, 1958 (aged 25)	(Italy) Gherdëina
4	D	Norbert Gasser	6 ft 4 in (193 cm)	198 lb (90 kg)	May 18, 1957 (aged 26)	(Italy) HC Bolzano
5	D	Gerard Ciarcia	6 ft 1 in (185 cm)	194 lb (88 kg)	October 23, 1956 (aged 27)	(Italy) Alleghe
6	D	John Bellio	5 ft 10 in (178 cm)	181 lb (82 kg)	December 19, 1954 (aged 29)	(Italy) Asiago
7	D	Mike Mastrullo	5 ft 9 in (175 cm)	185 lb (84 kg)	May 5, 1957 (aged 26)	(Italy) Alleghe
8	F	Ico Migliore	5 ft 10 in (178 cm)	179 lb (81 kg)	December 27, 1956 (aged 27)	(Italy) Varese
9	F	Adolf Insam (C)	5 ft 10 in (178 cm)	161 lb (73 kg)	August 4, 1951 (aged 32)	(Italy) Gherdëina
12	D/F	Dave Tomassoni	6 ft 0 in (183 cm)	198 lb (90 kg)	December 5, 1952 (aged 31)	(Italy) Varese
14	F	Michael Mair	5 ft 10 in (178 cm)	165 lb (75 kg)	August 31, 1956 (aged 27)	(Italy) HC Bolzano
16	F	Constant Priondolo	5 ft 7 in (170 cm)	165 lb (75 kg)	September 10, 1959 (aged 24)	(Italy) Alleghe
18	F	Grant Goegan	5 ft 11 in (180 cm)	174 lb (79 kg)	October 15, 1955 (aged 28)	(Italy) Merano
19	F	Fabrizio Kasslatter	5 ft 9 in (175 cm)	146 lb (66 kg)	September 6, 1954 (aged 29)	(Italy) Gherdëina
20	D/F	Roberto De Piero	6 ft 0 in (183 cm)	187 lb (85 kg)	December 25, 1954 (aged 29)	(Italy) Asiago
21	F	Cary Farelli	5 ft 7 in (170 cm)	174 lb (79 kg)	June 19, 1957 (aged 26)	(Italy) Varese
22	G	Adriano Tancon	5 ft 11 in (180 cm)	174 lb (79 kg)	November 18, 1958 (aged 25)	(Italy) Alleghe
23	F	Norbert Prünster	5 ft 9 in (175 cm)	161 lb (73 kg)	January 6, 1954 (aged 30)	(Italy) Merano
24	F	Thomas Milani	5 ft 5 in (165 cm)	165 lb (75 kg)	April 13, 1952 (aged 31)	(Italy) Brunico
25	F	Martin Pavlu	6 ft 2 in (188 cm)	187 lb (85 kg)	July 8, 1962 (aged 21)	(Italy) HC Bolzano
26	G	Marco Capone	6 ft 0 in (183 cm)	165 lb (75 kg)	January 22, 1959 (aged 25)	
30	D/F	Gino Pasqualotto	5 ft 11 in (180 cm)	185 lb (84 kg)	November 10, 1955 (aged 28)	(Italy) HC Bolzano

== Norway ==
Head coach: (Sweden) Hans Westberg

No.	Pos.	Name	Height	Weight	Birthdate	Team
1	G	Jørn Goldstein	5 ft 10 in (178 cm)	163 lb (74 kg)	March 27, 1953 (aged 30)	(Norway) Manglerud
2	G	Jim Marthinsen	6 ft 2 in (188 cm)	196 lb (89 kg)	April 15, 1956 (aged 27)	(Norway) Vålerenga
3	D	Øystein Jarlsbo	5 ft 11 in (180 cm)	183 lb (83 kg)	March 7, 1961 (aged 22)	(Norway) Furuset
4	D	Åge Ellingsen	6 ft 4 in (193 cm)	209 lb (95 kg)	November 5, 1962 (aged 21)	(Norway) Storhamar
5	D	Jon-Magne Karlstad	6 ft 2 in (188 cm)	176 lb (80 kg)	November 10, 1958 (aged 25)	(Norway) Vålerenga
6	D	Trond Abrahamsen	6 ft 0 in (183 cm)	192 lb (87 kg)	July 16, 1960 (aged 23)	(Norway) Manglerud
7	D	Per-Arne Kristiansen	6 ft 0 in (183 cm)	192 lb (87 kg)	September 9, 1959 (aged 24)	(Norway) Storhamar
8	F	Geir Myhre	6 ft 0 in (183 cm)	181 lb (82 kg)	April 7, 1954 (aged 29)	(Norway) Sparta Sarpsborg
10	F	Frank Vestreng	5 ft 11 in (180 cm)	179 lb (81 kg)	August 19, 1961 (aged 22)	(Norway) Vålerenga
12	F	Ørjan Løvdal	5 ft 10 in (178 cm)	172 lb (78 kg)	September 24, 1962 (aged 21)	(Norway) Stjernen Hockey
13	F	Roy Johansen	5 ft 11 in (180 cm)	185 lb (84 kg)	April 27, 1960 (aged 23)	(Norway) Sparta Sarpsborg
14	D	Øivind Løsåmoen	6 ft 1 in (185 cm)	190 lb (86 kg)	October 13, 1957 (aged 26)	(Norway) Storhamar
15	F	Arne Bergseng	6 ft 6 in (198 cm)	243 lb (110 kg)	March 22, 1961 (aged 22)	
16	F	Cato Andersen	-	-	June 10, 1959 (aged 24)	(Norway) Manglerud
17	F	Svein Lien	5 ft 8 in (173 cm)	154 lb (70 kg)	August 4, 1958 (aged 25)	(Norway) Furuset
18	F	Petter Thoresen	6 ft 0 in (183 cm)	187 lb (85 kg)	July 25, 1961 (aged 22)	(Norway) Manglerud
19	F	Bjørn Skaare	6 ft 0 in (183 cm)	181 lb (82 kg)	October 29, 1958 (aged 25)	(Norway) Furuset
20	F	Erik Kristiansen	6 ft 0 in (183 cm)	192 lb (87 kg)	March 12, 1961 (aged 22)	(Norway) Storhamar
22	F	Stephen Foyn	5 ft 11 in (180 cm)	185 lb (84 kg)	June 23, 1959 (aged 24)	
23	D	Erik Nerell	5 ft 7 in (170 cm)	154 lb (70 kg)	January 29, 1964 (aged 20)	

== Poland ==
Assistant coach: Emil Nikodemowicz

No.	Pos.	Name	Height	Weight	Birthdate	Team
1	G	Włodzimierz Olszewski	5 ft 10 in (178 cm)	194 lb (88 kg)	January 12, 1956 (aged 28)	(Poland) Zagłębie Sosnowiec
3	D	Andrzej Ujwary	5 ft 11 in (180 cm)	174 lb (79 kg)	August 21, 1960 (aged 23)	(Poland) Podhale Now Targ
5	D	Marek Cholewa	5 ft 9 in (175 cm)	196 lb (89 kg)	July 1, 1963 (aged 20)	(Poland) Zagłębie Sosnowiec
6	D	Henryk Gruth (C)	6 ft 0 in (183 cm)	198 lb (90 kg)	September 2, 1957 (aged 26)	(Poland) GKS Tychy
7	D	Robert Szopiński	6 ft 1 in (185 cm)	198 lb (90 kg)	February 15, 1961 (aged 22)	(Poland) Podhale Nowy Targ
7	F	Jan Stopczyk	6 ft 0 in (183 cm)	190 lb (86 kg)	September 28, 1958 (aged 25)	(Poland) ŁKS Łódź
8	F	Wiesław Jobczyk	5 ft 8 in (173 cm)	170 lb (77 kg)	February 23, 1954 (aged 29)	(Poland) Zagłębie Sosnowiec
10	D	Andrzej Nowak	5 ft 11 in (180 cm)	170 lb (77 kg)	February 7, 1956 (aged 28)	(Poland) Zagłębie Sosnowiec
11	F	Krystian Sikorski	5 ft 10 in (178 cm)	163 lb (74 kg)	April 14, 1961 (aged 22)	(Poland) Polonia Bytom
12	F	Andrzej Hachula	5 ft 9 in (175 cm)	157 lb (71 kg)	August 6, 1960 (aged 23)	(Poland) Naprzód Janów
14	F	Janusz Adamiec	5 ft 9 in (175 cm)	165 lb (75 kg)	April 29, 1962 (aged 21)	(Poland) Naprzód Janów
15	F	Andrzej Zabawa	5 ft 8 in (173 cm)	146 lb (66 kg)	November 29, 1955 (aged 28)	(Poland) Zagłębie Sosnowiec
16	F	Henryk Pytel	5 ft 9 in (175 cm)	159 lb (72 kg)	September 15, 1955 (aged 28)	(Germany) EV Landshut
17	F	Stanisław Klocek	5 ft 8 in (173 cm)	150 lb (68 kg)	October 17, 1955 (aged 28)	(Poland) Zagłębie Sosnowiec
18	F	Leszek Jachna	5 ft 11 in (180 cm)	161 lb (73 kg)	May 9, 1958 (aged 25)	(Poland) Podhale Nowy Targ
19	F	Jerzy Christ	6 ft 1 in (185 cm)	192 lb (87 kg)	September 15, 1958 (aged 25)	(Poland) Polonia Bytom
20	F	Jan Piecko	5 ft 11 in (180 cm)	159 lb (72 kg)	February 3, 1955 (aged 29)	(Poland) Polonia Bytom
21	D	Ludwik Synowiec	5 ft 9 in (175 cm)	185 lb (84 kg)	January 19, 1958 (aged 26)	(Poland) GKS Tychy
23	D	Andrzej Chowaniec	6 ft 1 in (185 cm)	187 lb (85 kg)	January 1, 1958 (aged 26)	(Poland) Podhale Nowy Targ
25	G	Gabriel Samolej	5 ft 10 in (178 cm)	161 lb (73 kg)	June 1, 1961 (aged 22)	(Poland) Podhale Nowy Targ

== Soviet Union ==
Head coach: Viktor Tikhonov

No.	Pos.	Name	Height	Weight	Birthdate	Team
1	G	Vladimir Myshkin	5 ft 11 in (180 cm)	154 lb (70 kg)	June 19, 1955 (aged 28)	(Soviet Union) Dynamo Moskva
2	D	Viacheslav Fetisov (C)	6 ft 0 in (183 cm)	218 lb (99 kg)	April 20, 1958 (aged 25)	(Soviet Union) CSKA Moskva
5	D	Vasili Pervukhin	5 ft 11 in (180 cm)	203 lb (92 kg)	January 1, 1956 (aged 28)	(Soviet Union) Dynamo Moskva
6	F	Mikhail Vasiliev	6 ft 0 in (183 cm)	185 lb (84 kg)	June 8, 1962 (aged 21)	(Soviet Union) CSKA Moskva
7	D	Alexei Kasatonov	6 ft 1 in (185 cm)	196 lb (89 kg)	October 14, 1959 (aged 24)	(Soviet Union) CSKA Moskva
9	F	Vladimir Krutov	5 ft 9 in (175 cm)	194 lb (88 kg)	June 1, 1960 (aged 23)	(Soviet Union) CSKA Moskva
11	F	Igor Larionov	5 ft 9 in (175 cm)	172 lb (78 kg)	December 3, 1960 (aged 23)	(Soviet Union) CSKA Moskva
12	D	Sergei Starikov	5 ft 10 in (178 cm)	225 lb (102 kg)	December 4, 1958 (aged 25)	(Soviet Union) CSKA Moskva
13	F	Nikolai Drozdetsky	6 ft 1 in (185 cm)	185 lb (84 kg)	June 14, 1957 (aged 26)	(Soviet Union) CSKA Moskva
14	D	Zinetula Bilyaletdinov	5 ft 11 in (180 cm)	190 lb (86 kg)	March 13, 1955 (aged 28)	(Soviet Union) Dynamo Moskva
15	F	Andrei Khomutov	5 ft 10 in (178 cm)	181 lb (82 kg)	April 21, 1961 (aged 22)	(Soviet Union) CSKA Moskva
20	G	Vladislav Tretiak	6 ft 0 in (183 cm)	201 lb (91 kg)	April 25, 1952 (aged 31)	(Soviet Union) CSKA Moskva
21	F	Sergei Shepelev	5 ft 10 in (178 cm)	176 lb (80 kg)	October 13, 1955 (aged 28)	(Soviet Union) Spartak Moskva
22	D	Igor Stelnov	6 ft 0 in (183 cm)	209 lb (95 kg)	February 12, 1963 (aged 20)	(Soviet Union) CSKA Moskva
23	F	Alexander Gerasimov	5 ft 10 in (178 cm)	179 lb (81 kg)	March 19, 1959 (aged 24)	(Soviet Union) CSKA Moskva
24	F	Sergei Makarov	5 ft 11 in (180 cm)	183 lb (83 kg)	June 19, 1958 (aged 25)	(Soviet Union) CSKA Moskva
26	F	Alexander Skvortsov	5 ft 7 in (170 cm)	190 lb (86 kg)	August 28, 1954 (aged 29)	(Soviet Union) Torpedo Gorky
28	F	Viktor Tyumenev	6 ft 0 in (183 cm)	190 lb (86 kg)	June 1, 1957 (aged 26)	(Soviet Union) Spartak Moskva
29	F	Alexander Kozhevnikov	6 ft 3 in (191 cm)	194 lb (88 kg)	September 21, 1958 (aged 25)	(Soviet Union) Spartak Moskva
31	F	Vladimir Kovin	6 ft 0 in (183 cm)	198 lb (90 kg)	June 20, 1954 (aged 29)	(Soviet Union) Torpedo Gorky

== Sweden ==
Head coach: Anders Parmström

Assistant coach: Kjell Larsson

No.	Pos.	Name	Height	Weight	Birthdate	Team
1	G	Rolf Ridderwall	5 ft 11 in (180 cm)	172 lb (78 kg)	November 20, 1958 (aged 25)	(Sweden) Djurgårdens IF
2	D	Mats Thelin	5 ft 11 in (180 cm)	187 lb (85 kg)	March 30, 1961 (aged 22)	(Sweden) AIK
5	D	Michael Thelvén	6 ft 0 in (183 cm)	179 lb (81 kg)	January 7, 1961 (aged 23)	(Sweden) Djurgårdens IF
6	D	Göran Lindblom	6 ft 0 in (183 cm)	187 lb (85 kg)	March 4, 1956 (aged 27)	(Sweden) Skellefteå AIK
7	D	Bo Ericson	5 ft 10 in (178 cm)	179 lb (81 kg)	January 23, 1958 (aged 26)	(Sweden) AIK
8	F	Thom Eklund	6 ft 0 in (183 cm)	185 lb (84 kg)	October 28, 1958 (aged 25)	(Sweden) IF Björklöven
9	D	Mats Waltin	5 ft 11 in (180 cm)	172 lb (78 kg)	October 7, 1953 (aged 30)	(Sweden) Djurgårdens IF
10	D	Thomas Åhlén	6 ft 0 in (183 cm)	196 lb (89 kg)	March 8, 1959 (aged 24)	(Sweden) Skellefteå AIK
11	F	Thomas Rundqvist	6 ft 3 in (191 cm)	196 lb (89 kg)	May 4, 1960 (aged 23)	(Sweden) Färjestad BK
11	F	Jens Öhling	6 ft 0 in (183 cm)	196 lb (89 kg)	April 3, 1962 (aged 21)	(Sweden) Djurgårdens IF
12	F	Håkan Eriksson	6 ft 0 in (183 cm)	190 lb (86 kg)	January 24, 1956 (aged 28)	(Sweden) Djurgårdens IF
14	F	Per-Erik Eklund	5 ft 10 in (178 cm)	185 lb (84 kg)	March 22, 1963 (aged 20)	(Sweden) AIK
15	F	Peter Gradin	5 ft 10 in (178 cm)	172 lb (78 kg)	December 9, 1958 (aged 25)	(Sweden) AIK
16	F	Tommy Mörth	5 ft 10 in (178 cm)	192 lb (87 kg)	July 16, 1959 (aged 24)	(Sweden) Djurgårdens IF
18	F	Michael Hjälm	6 ft 1 in (185 cm)	183 lb (83 kg)	March 23, 1963 (aged 20)	(Sweden) Modo AIK
19	F	Mats Hessel	5 ft 9 in (175 cm)	170 lb (77 kg)	March 13, 1961 (aged 22)	(Sweden) AIK
21	D	Håkan Nordin	5 ft 10 in (178 cm)	183 lb (83 kg)	January 15, 1961 (aged 23)	(Sweden) Färjestad BK
22	F	Håkan Södergren	5 ft 9 in (175 cm)	176 lb (80 kg)	June 14, 1959 (aged 24)	(Sweden) Djurgårdens IF
28	F	Tomas Sandström	6 ft 2 in (188 cm)	209 lb (95 kg)	September 4, 1964 (aged 19)	(Sweden) Brynäs IF
30	G	Göte Wälitalo	6 ft 0 in (183 cm)	176 lb (80 kg)	July 18, 1956 (aged 27)	(Sweden) IF Björklöven

== United States ==
Head coach: Lou Vairo

No.	Pos.	Name	Height	Weight	Birthdate	Team
1	G	Bob Mason	6 ft 1 in (185 cm)	181 lb (82 kg)	April 22, 1961 (aged 22)	(United States) Minnesota Duluth Bulldogs
6	D	Mark Fusco	5 ft 9 in (175 cm)	176 lb (80 kg)	March 12, 1961 (aged 22)	(United States) Harvard Crimson
7	F	David A. Jensen	6 ft 1 in (185 cm)	181 lb (82 kg)	August 19, 1965 (aged 18)	(United States) Lawrence Academy Spartans
8	F	Phil Verchota	6 ft 2 in (188 cm)	194 lb (88 kg)	December 28, 1956 (aged 27)	
9	F	Scott Fusco	5 ft 9 in (175 cm)	172 lb (78 kg)	January 21, 1963 (aged 21)	(United States) Harvard Crimson
10	F	Steven Griffith	5 ft 10 in (178 cm)	181 lb (82 kg)	March 31, 1961 (aged 22)	(United States) Minnesota Golden Golphers
12	F	Eddie Olczyk	6 ft 1 in (185 cm)	201 lb (91 kg)	August 16, 1966 (aged 17)	(Canada) Stratford Cullitons
13	F	Bob Brooke	5 ft 11 in (180 cm)	194 lb (88 kg)	December 18, 1960 (aged 23)	(United States) Yale Bulldogs
16	F	Pat LaFontaine	5 ft 10 in (178 cm)	181 lb (82 kg)	February 22, 1965 (aged 18)	(Canada) Verdun Juniors
17	F	Scott Bjugstad	6 ft 1 in (185 cm)	185 lb (84 kg)	June 2, 1961 (aged 22)	(United States) Minnesota Golden Golphers
18	D	Al Iafrate	6 ft 0 in (183 cm)	240 lb (110 kg)	March 21, 1966 (aged 17)	(United States) Detroit Compuware Ambassadors
19	F	Paul Guay	5 ft 11 in (180 cm)	185 lb (84 kg)	September 2, 1963 (aged 20)	(United States) Providence Friars
21	D	Chris Chelios	6 ft 0 in (183 cm)	192 lb (87 kg)	January 25, 1962 (aged 22)	(United States) Wisconsin Badgers
22	D	Tom Hirsch	6 ft 4 in (193 cm)	209 lb (95 kg)	January 27, 1963 (aged 21)	(United States) Minnesota Golden Golphers
23	F	John Harrington	5 ft 10 in (178 cm)	179 lb (81 kg)	May 29, 1957 (aged 26)	(Germany) EV Pfronten
24	D	Gary Haight	5 ft 11 in (180 cm)	168 lb (76 kg)	October 4, 1961 (aged 22)	(United States) Michigan State Spartans
25	F	Mark Kumpel	6 ft 0 in (183 cm)	190 lb (86 kg)	March 7, 1961 (aged 22)	(United States) UMass Lowell River Hawks
26	F	Corey Millen	5 ft 6 in (168 cm)	190 lb (86 kg)	March 30, 1964 (aged 19)	(United States) Minnesota Golden Golphers
27	F	Gary Sampson	6 ft 0 in (183 cm)	190 lb (86 kg)	August 24, 1959 (aged 24)	
28	D	David H. Jensen	6 ft 2 in (188 cm)	190 lb (86 kg)	May 3, 1961 (aged 22)	(United States) Minnesota Golden Golphers
29	G	Marc Behrend	6 ft 1 in (185 cm)	185 lb (84 kg)	January 11, 1961 (aged 23)	(United States) Wisconsin Badgers

== West Germany ==
Head coach: Xaver Unsinn

No.	Pos.	Name	Height	Weight	Birthdate	Team
3	D	Andreas Niederberger	5 ft 10 in (178 cm)	181 lb (82 kg)	April 20, 1963 (aged 20)	(Germany) Mannheimer ERC
4	D	Udo Kießling	5 ft 11 in (180 cm)	185 lb (84 kg)	May 21, 1955 (aged 28)	(Germany) Kölner EC
6	D	Joachim Reil	5 ft 10 in (178 cm)	183 lb (83 kg)	May 17, 1955 (aged 28)	(Germany) ECD Iserlohn
8	D	Peter Scharf	5 ft 9 in (175 cm)	183 lb (83 kg)	July 15, 1953 (aged 30)	(Germany) Sportbund DJK Rosenheim
9	F	Ernst Höfner	5 ft 10 in (178 cm)	172 lb (78 kg)	September 21, 1957 (aged 26)	(Germany) Sportbund DJK Rosenheim
10	F	Franz Reindl	5 ft 11 in (180 cm)	174 lb (79 kg)	November 24, 1954 (aged 29)	(Germany) SC Riessersee
11	F	Manfred Wolf	6 ft 0 in (183 cm)	187 lb (85 kg)	March 26, 1957 (aged 26)	(Germany) Mannheimer ERC
14	F	Erich Kühnhackl (C)	6 ft 5 in (196 cm)	214 lb (97 kg)	October 17, 1950 (aged 33)	(Germany) EV Landshut
15	F	Marcus Kuhl	5 ft 10 in (178 cm)	176 lb (80 kg)	March 15, 1956 (aged 27)	(Germany) Kölner EC
17	F	Gerd Truntschka	5 ft 9 in (175 cm)	165 lb (75 kg)	September 10, 1958 (aged 25)	(Germany) Kölner EC
19	D	Ignaz Berndaner	5 ft 9 in (175 cm)	174 lb (79 kg)	July 4, 1954 (aged 29)	(Germany) SC Riessersee
21	D	Harold Kreis	5 ft 11 in (180 cm)	196 lb (89 kg)	January 19, 1959 (aged 25)	(Germany) Mannheimer ERC
22	F	Roy Roedger	6 ft 4 in (193 cm)	203 lb (92 kg)	October 11, 1958 (aged 25)	(Germany) Mannheimer ERC
23	F	Dieter Hegen	6 ft 0 in (183 cm)	198 lb (90 kg)	April 29, 1962 (aged 21)	(Germany) ESV Kaufbeuren
24	F	Helmut Steiger	5 ft 10 in (178 cm)	176 lb (80 kg)	January 5, 1959 (aged 25)	(Germany) EV Landshut
25	D	Uli Hiemer	6 ft 1 in (185 cm)	190 lb (86 kg)	September 21, 1962 (aged 21)	(Germany) Kölner EC
26	F	Manfred Ahne	5 ft 9 in (175 cm)	190 lb (86 kg)	June 2, 1961 (aged 22)	(Germany) Sportbund DJK Rosenheim
27	G	Karl Friesen	6 ft 0 in (183 cm)	165 lb (75 kg)	June 30, 1958 (aged 25)	(Germany) Sportbund DJK Rosenheim
28	F	Michael Betz	6 ft 0 in (183 cm)	176 lb (80 kg)	February 19, 1962 (aged 21)	(Germany) Sportbund DJK Rosenheim
29	G	Bernhard Englbrecht	5 ft 8 in (173 cm)	163 lb (74 kg)	February 16, 1958 (aged 25)	(Germany) EV Landshut

== Yugoslavia ==
No.	Pos.	Name	Height	Weight	Birthdate	Team
24	F/D	Igor Beribak	5 ft 9 in (175 cm)	176 lb (80 kg)	May 18, 1964 (aged 19)	(Socialist Federal Republic of Yugoslavia) Olimpia Ljubljana
7	F	Mustafa Bešić	5 ft 10 in (178 cm)	176 lb (80 kg)	March 12, 1961 (aged 22)	(Italy) Fassa
3	F/D	Dejan Burnik	6 ft 0 in (183 cm)	198 lb (90 kg)	March 25, 1963 (aged 20)	
19	F	Marjan Gorenc	5 ft 10 in (178 cm)	179 lb (81 kg)	February 27, 1964 (aged 19)	(Socialist Federal Republic of Yugoslavia) Olimpia Ljubljana
8	F	Edo Hafner	5 ft 9 in (175 cm)	185 lb (84 kg)	January 9, 1955 (aged 29)	
21	F	Gorazd Hiti	5 ft 8 in (173 cm)	187 lb (85 kg)	August 12, 1948 (aged 35)	(Socialist Federal Republic of Yugoslavia) Olimpia Ljubljana
17	F	Drago Horvat	6 ft 0 in (183 cm)	183 lb (83 kg)	July 9, 1958 (aged 25)	
13	F	Peter Klemenc	5 ft 8 in (173 cm)	176 lb (80 kg)	June 16, 1956 (aged 27)	(Socialist Federal Republic of Yugoslavia) HK Jesenice
4	D	Jože Kovač	5 ft 10 in (178 cm)	174 lb (79 kg)	September 23, 1961 (aged 22)	
10	D	Vojko Lajovec	5 ft 8 in (173 cm)	176 lb (80 kg)	March 18, 1962 (aged 21)	(Socialist Federal Republic of Yugoslavia) Olimpia Ljubljana
	F	Tomaž Lepša	5 ft 11 in (180 cm)	181 lb (82 kg)	June 11, 1955 (aged 28)	
22	F	Blaž Lomovšek	5 ft 10 in (178 cm)	183 lb (83 kg)	December 24, 1956 (aged 27)	(Socialist Federal Republic of Yugoslavia) Olimpia Ljubljana
25	G	Dominik Lomovšek	5 ft 7 in (170 cm)	168 lb (76 kg)	September 13, 1954 (aged 29)	(Socialist Federal Republic of Yugoslavia) Olimpia Ljubljana
5	D	Drago Mlinarec	6 ft 2 in (188 cm)	190 lb (86 kg)	August 24, 1960 (aged 23)	(Socialist Federal Republic of Yugoslavia) HK Jesenice
1	D	Murajica Pajić	5 ft 11 in (180 cm)	190 lb (86 kg)	August 24, 1961 (aged 22)	(Socialist Federal Republic of Yugoslavia) HK Jesenice
20	G	Cveto Pretnar	5 ft 10 in (178 cm)	185 lb (84 kg)	January 27, 1957 (aged 27)	(Socialist Federal Republic of Yugoslavia) HK Jesenice
14	F	Bojan Raspet	5 ft 11 in (180 cm)	176 lb (80 kg)	January 22, 1960 (aged 24)	
15	D	Ivan Ščap	5 ft 10 in (178 cm)	172 lb (78 kg)	December 3, 1955 (aged 28)	
23	F	Matjaž Sekelj	5 ft 10 in (178 cm)	163 lb (74 kg)	September 12, 1960 (aged 23)	
11	F	Zvone Šuvak	6 ft 0 in (183 cm)	179 lb (81 kg)	August 29, 1958 (aged 25)	(Socialist Federal Republic of Yugoslavia) HK Jesenice
6	D	Andrej Vidmar	5 ft 11 in (180 cm)	198 lb (90 kg)	March 15, 1956 (aged 27)	

== Sources ==
- Duplacey, James (1998). Total Hockey: The official encyclopedia of the National Hockey League. Total Sports. ISBN 0-8362-7114-9.
- Podnieks, Andrew (2010). IIHF Media Guide & Record Book 2011. Moydart Pres.
- Hockey Hall Of Fame page on the 1984 Olympics
- Wallechinsky, David (1988). The Complete Book of the Olympics. Penguin Books. pp. 614. ISBN 0-14-010771-1.
