= List of Olympic men's ice hockey players for Poland =

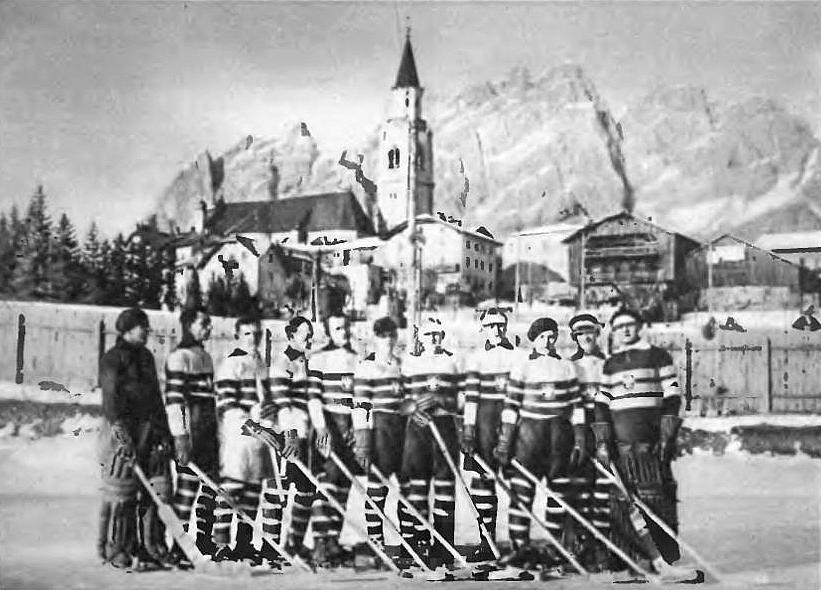
The Polish national team at the 1928 Winter Olympics; this marked their Olympic debut.

Men's ice hockey tournaments have been staged at the Olympic Games since 1920. The men's tournament was introduced as a demonstration sport at the 1920 Summer Olympics, and made a permanent sport when the Winter Olympics began in 1924. The Polish national team has participated in thirteen tournaments, first in 1928 and most recently in 1992. A total of 18 goaltenders and 136 skaters have represented Poland at the Olympics.

Poland has never finished higher than fourth at the Olympics, which they achieved at the 1932 Winter Olympics, when only four teams participated. Their lowest finish was eleventh, of twelve teams, in 1992. Since 1992, Poland has not participated in the Olympics, though the team has played in Olympic qualifying tournaments.

The Olympic Games were originally intended for amateur athletes, so the players of the National Hockey League (NHL) and other professional leagues were not allowed to compete. The countries that benefited most were the Soviet Bloc countries of Eastern Europe, where top athletes were state-sponsored while retaining their status as amateurs. In 1986, the International Olympic Committee (IOC) voted to allow all athletes to compete in Olympic Games, starting in 1988.

Hilary Skarżyński has scored the most goals, with nine, while Andrzej Fonfara and Andrzej Zabawa have had the most assists, with seven each. Zabawa and Wiesław Jobczyk have each recorded fourteen points, the most of any Polish player. Henryk Gruth and Jerzy Potz have competed in the most Olympics, having taken part in four tournaments, while Gruth has played the most games of any skater, with twenty-four. Władysław Pabisz has won the most games for Poland, with five, while Gabriel Samolej and Józef Stogowski have each played in ten games, the most of any goaltender. Gruth is the only Polish player to be inducted into the International Ice Hockey Federation Hall of Fame.

== Key ==
General terms
Term	Definition
GP	Games played
IIHFHOF	International Ice Hockey Federation Hall of Fame
Olympics	Number of Olympic Games tournaments
Ref(s)	Reference(s)

Goaltender statistical abbreviations
Abbreviation	Definition
W	Wins
L	Losses
T	Ties
Min	Minutes played
SO	Shutouts
GA	Goals against
GAA	Goals against average

Skater statistical abbreviations
Abbreviation	Definition
G	Goals
A	Assists
P	Points
PIM	Penalty minutes

== Goaltenders ==
Goaltenders
Player	Olympics	Tournament(s)	GP	W	L	T	Min	SO	GA	GAA	Ref(s)
Marek Batkiewicz	1	1992	4	0	1	0	181	0	13	4.30	
Jan Hampel	1	1952	3	0	2	0	70	0	15	12.86	
Andrzej Hanisz	1	1988	2	0	1	1	80	0	5	3.75	
Mariusz Kieca	1	1992	3	0	3	0	160	0	13	4.87	
Edward Kocząb	1	1956	4	1	3	0	240	0	19	4.75	
Walery Kosyl	2	1972, 1976	8	0	7	0	420	0	47	6.71	
Franciszek Kukla	1	1988	1	0	1	0	40	0	3	4.50	
Paweł Łukaszka	1	1980	2	0	2	0	66	0	7	6.33	
Jan Maciejko	1	1948	3	0	2	0	140	0	35	15.02	
Włodzimierz Olszewski	1	1984	6	1	4	0	280	0	32	6.86	
Władysław Pabisz	2	1956, 1964	6	5	1	0	360	1	17	2.83	
Henryk Przeździecki	2	1936, 1948	6	3	3	0	325	0	42	7.75	
Gabriel Samolej	3	1984, 1988, 1992	10	1	4	1	398	0	32	4.83	
Józef Stogowski	3	1928, 1932, 1936	10	0	9	1	450	0	49	6.53	
Stanisław Szlendak	1	1952	8	2	3	1	410	0	41	6.00	
Andrzej Tkacz	2	1972, 1976	3	0	2	0	120	0	29	14.50	
Józef Wiśniewski	1	1964	2	2	0	0	120	0	3	1.50	
Henryk Wojtynek	1	1980	5	2	1	0	234	0	16	4.10	

== Skaters ==
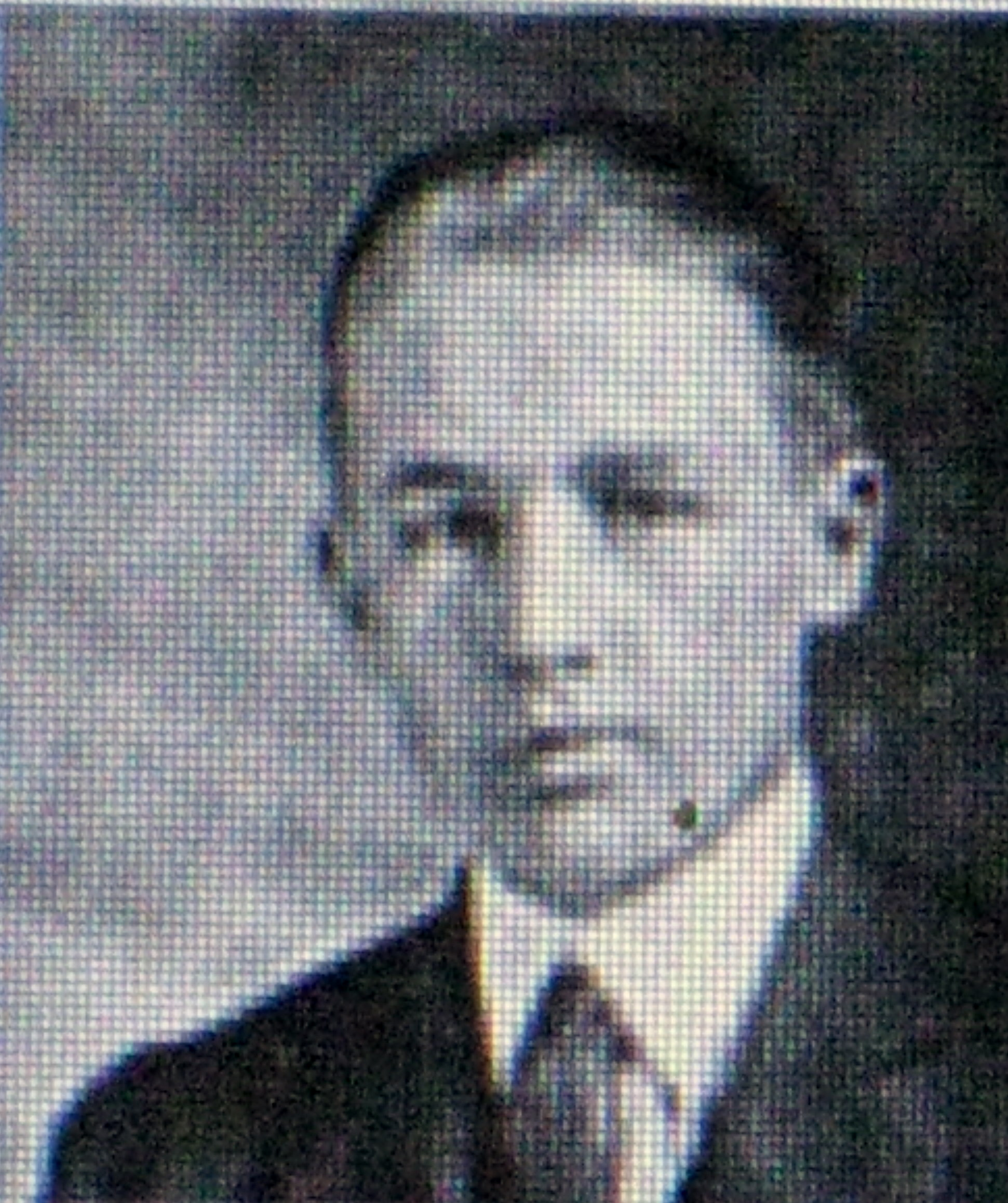
Tadeusz Adamowski captained Poland at the 1928 Winter Olympics, Poland's first Olympic tournament.

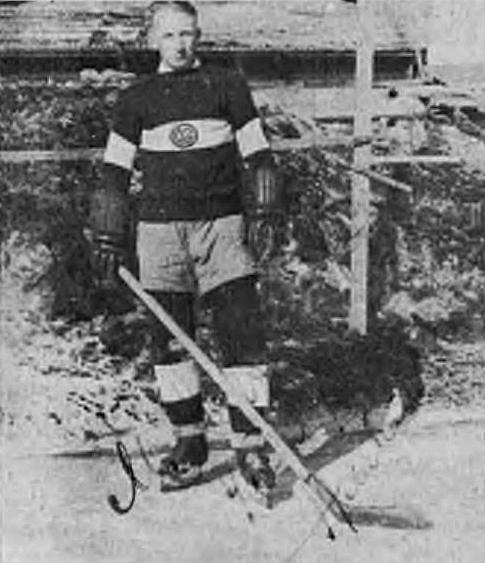
Michał Antuszewicz played two games at the 1952 Winter Olympics.

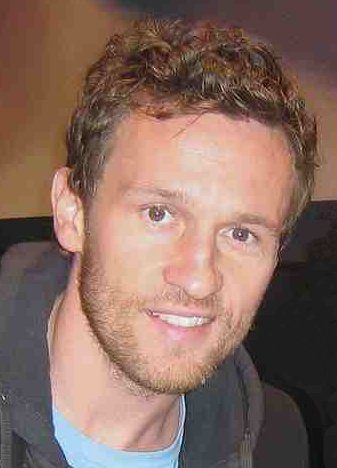
Mariusz Czerkawski recorded one assist at the 1992 Winter Olympics, the most recent Olympic tournament for Poland.

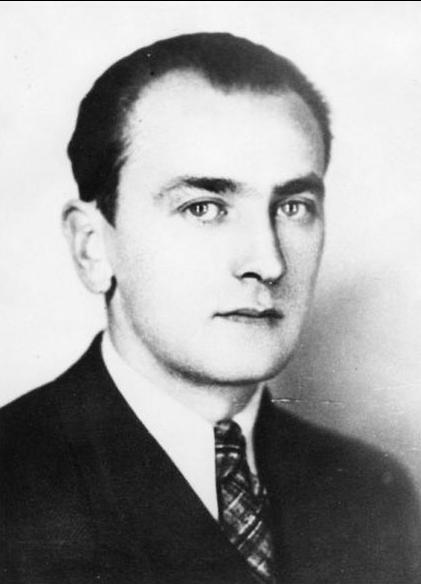
Aleksander Kowalski played in the 1928 and 1932 Winter Olympics, scoring two goals in eight games.

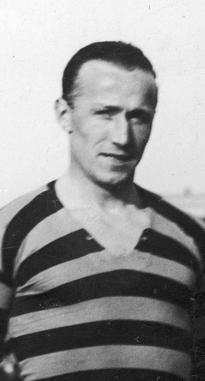
Władysław Król played three games at the 1936 Winter Olympics.

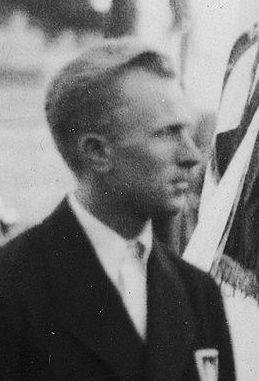
Witalis Ludwiczak represented Poland at both the 1932 and 1936 Winter Olympics.

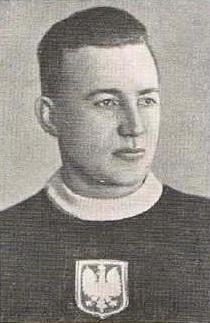
Roman Sabiński played in all six games at the 1932 Winter Olympics.

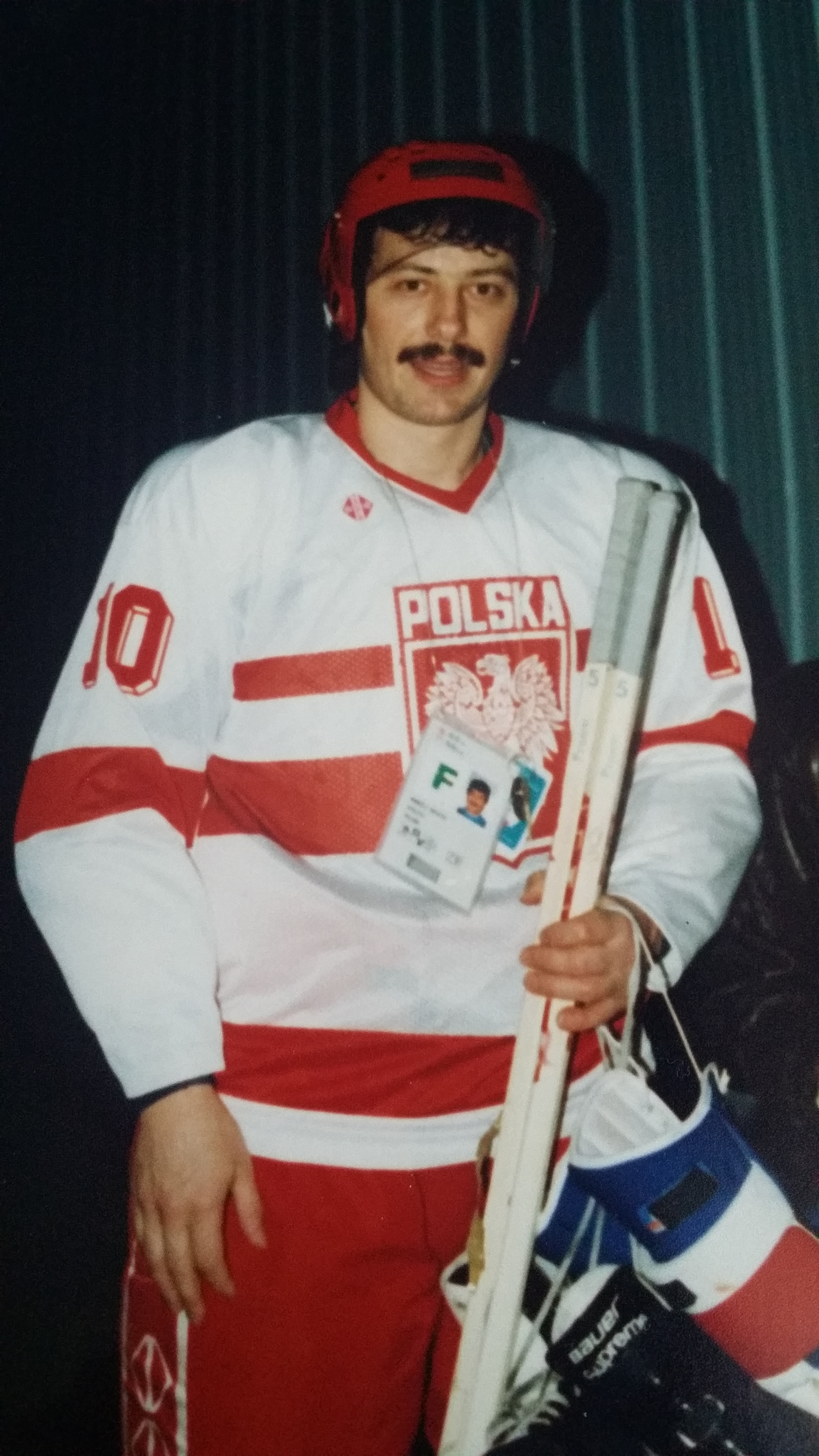
Andrzej Świątek scored one goal at the 1988 Winter Olympics.

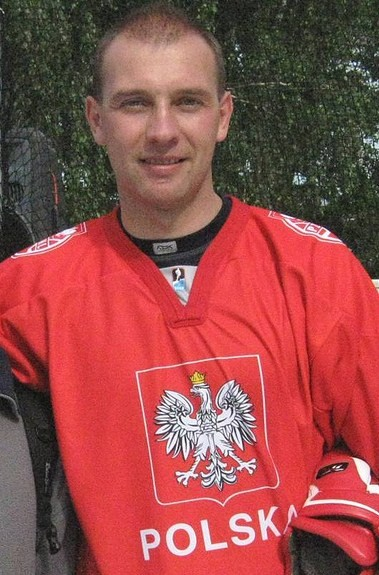
Wojciech Tkacz recorded one assist in seven games at the 1992 Winter Olympics.

Skaters
Player	Olympics	Tournament(s)	GP	G	A	P	PIM	Notes	Ref(s)
Janusz Adamiec	3	1984, 1988, 1992	19	2	1	3	0		
Tadeusz Adamowski	1	1928	2	1	0	1	0	Team captain (1928)	
Michał Antuszewicz	1	1952	2	0	0	0	0		
Józef Batkiewicz	1	1972	5	0	1	1	2		
Krzysztof Birula-Białynicki	1	1972	4	0	1	1	0		
Henryk Bromowicz	3	1948, 1952, 1956	20	1	0	1	0		
Kazimierz Bryniarski	1	1956	5	3	0	3	0		
Krzysztof Bujar	1	1992	7	0	1	1	2		
Mieczysław Burda	1	1948	8	0	0	0	0		
Mieczysław Chmura	1	1956	5	1	0	1	14		
Kazimierz Chodakowski	2	1952, 1956	13	3	0	3	6		
Marek Cholewa	3	1984, 1988, 1992	19	0	3	3	8		
Andrzej Chowaniec	1	1984	6	1	0	1	2		
Stefan Chowaniec	3	1972, 1976, 1980	11	1	3	4	6	Team captain (1980)	
Jerzy Christ	2	1984, 1988	12	7	3	10	2		
Mirosław Copija	1	1988	5	0	1	1	4		
Stefan Csorich	2	1948, 1952	15	6	4	10	0		
Ludwik Czachowski	1	1972	5	0	0	0	2	Team captain (1972)	
Rudolf Czech	2	1952, 1956	12	0	0	0	0		
Mariusz Czerkawski	1	1992	5	0	1	1	4		
Bogdan Dziubiński	1	1980	5	1	1	2	0		
Marian Feter	1	1972	2	0	0	0	16		
Andrzej Fonfara	1	1964	7	5	7	12	4		
Stanisław Fryźlewicz	1	1972	5	0	0	0	0		
Alfred Gansiniec	2	1948, 1952	13	7	0	7	0		
Dariusz Garbocz	1	1992	7	0	1	1	6		
Zygmunt Ginter	1	1948	2	0	0	0	0		
Feliks Góralczyk	1	1972	5	2	0	2	0		
Robert Góralczyk	2	1972, 1976	7	0	0	0	0	Team captain (1976)	
Bronisław Gosztyła	2	1956, 1964	12	7	6	13	4		
Henryk Gruth	4	1980, 1984, 1988, 1992	24	0	5	5	6	Team captain (1984, 1988, 1992); IIHFHOF (2006)	
Andrzej Hachuła	1	1984	6	0	2	2	0		
Janusz Hajnos	1	1992	6	2	1	3	0		
Henryk Handy	1	1964	6	1	0	1	0		
Marian Herda	1	1956	2	0	0	0	2		
Andrzej Iskrzycki	1	1976	4	0	0	0	2		
Leszek Jachna	3	1980, 1984, 1988	17	0	0	0	10		
Kordian Jajszczok	1	1976	4	0	1	1	2		
Andrzej Jańczy	1	1980	5	0	0	0	2		
Szymon Janiczko	1	1956	5	1	0	1	2		
Henryk Janiszewski	1	1980	5	1	2	3	2		
Tomasz Jasiński	1	1948	6	0	0	0	0		
Mieczysław Jaskierski	1	1976	3	0	0	0	4		
Marian Jeżak	1	1952	8	3	1	4	0		
Wiesław Jobczyk	3	1976, 1980, 1984	15	8	6	14	10		
Kazimierz Jurek	1	1992	7	1	1	2	2		
Tadeusz Kacik	1	1972	5	1	1	2	2		
Andrzej Kądziołka	2	1988, 1992	13	1	2	3	8		
Marian Kajzerek	1	1972	4	0	0	0	0		
Mieczysław Kasprzycki	2	1936, 1948	7	0	0	0	0		
Tadeusz Kilanowicz	1	1964	7	4	2	6	2		
Waldemar Klisiak	1	1992	6	1	0	1	12		
Stanisław Klocek	2	1980, 1984	11	2	2	4	6		
Leszek Kokoszka	2	1976, 1980	9	5	2	7	4		
Bolesław Kolasa	1	1948	4	2	0	2	2		
Adam Kopczyński	1	1972	5	0	1	1	0		
Adam Kowalski	3	1932, 1936, 1948	16	6	0	6	0		
Aleksander Kowalski	2	1928, 1932	8	2	0	2	6		
Władysław Król	1	1936	3	0	0	0	0		
Włodzimierz Krygier	2	1928, 1932	7	0	0	0	2		
Lucjan Kulej	1	1928	2	0	0	0	0		
Józef Kurek	2	1956, 1964	9	4	1	5	2	Team captain (1956, 1964)	
Krzysztof Kuźniecow	1	1992	7	0	0	0	4		
Piotr Kwasigroch	1	1988	6	0	0	0	2		
Gerard Langner	1	1964	7	0	0	0	2		
Eugeniusz Lewacki	2	1948, 1952	14	8	2	10	0		
Witalis Ludwiczak	2	1932, 1936	9	0	0	0	2		
Andrzej Małysiak	1	1980	5	2	6	8	0		
Józef Manowski	1	1964	7	7	1	8	2		
Czesław Marchewczyk	3	1932, 1936, 1948	14	3	0	3	2		
Marek Marcińczak	2	1976, 1980	9	0	3	3	2		
Kazimierz Materski	1	1932	6	0	0	0	2		
Albert Mauer	1	1932	1	0	0	0	0		
Jarosław Morawiecki	1	1988	3	2	1	3	0		
Andrzej Nowak	1	1984	6	1	1	2	2		
Zdzisław Nowak	1	1956	4	0	0	0	0		
Tadeusz Obłój	3	1972, 1976, 1980	14	4	2	6	0		
Jerzy Ogórczyk	1	1964	7	1	0	1	2		
Stanisław Olczyk	2	1956, 1964	12	1	1	2	4		
Ireneusz Pacula	1	1988	5	1	0	1	2		
Mieczysław Palus	1	1948	6	5	0	5	0		
Roman Penczek	1	1952	7	0	0	0	0		
Jan Piecko	1	1984	5	1	3	4	0		
Dariusz Płatek	1	1992	6	0	0	0	0		
Krzysztof Podsiadło	1	1988	6	0	1	1	2		
Jerzy Potz	4	1972, 1976, 1980, 1988	20	0	2	2	13		
Mariusz Puzio	1	1992	7	2	0	2	4		
Henryk Pytel	3	1976, 1980, 1984	15	2	4	6	16		
Roman Sabiński	1	1932	6	0	0	0	6		
Dariusz Sikora	1	1980	5	0	0	0	0		
Krystian Sikorski	2	1984, 1988	12	3	1	4	2		
Hubert Sitko	1	1964	7	0	3	3	8		
Hilary Skarżyński	3	1948, 1952, 1956	19	9	0	9	2		
Augustyn Skórski	1	1964	7	2	0	2	0		
Andrzej Słowakiewicz	1	1976	4	0	0	0	6		
Józef Słowakiewicz	1	1972	5	2	0	2	0		
Aleksander Słuczanowski	1	1928	1	0	0	0	0		
Jerzy Sobera	1	1992	7	0	0	0	0		
Kazimierz Sokołowski	2	1932, 1936	9	0	0	0	12		
Rafał Sroka	1	1992	7	0	1	1	14		
Roman Steblecki	1	1988	6	1	0	1	2		
Marek Stebnicki	1	1988	6	1	2	3	0		
Józef Stefaniak	1	1964	7	5	2	7	4		
Jan Stopczyk	2	1984, 1988	10	2	1	3	8		
Roman Stupnicki	1	1936	1	1	0	1	0		
Andrzej Świątek	1	1988	6	1	0	1	9		
Tadeusz Świcarz	1	1952	8	0	0	0	0		
Andrzej Świstak	1	1992	7	0	1	1	0		
Ludwik Synowiec	2	1980, 1984	11	0	0	0	6		
Andrzej Szal	1	1964	6	3	2	5	14		
Andrzej Szczepaniec	1	1972	5	0	0	0	6		
Karol Szenajch	1	1928	2	0	0	0	0		
Jacek Szopiński	1	1988	6	0	1	1	4		
Robert Szopiński	3	1984, 1988, 1992	19	1	2	3	8		
Wojciech Tkacz	1	1992	7	0	1	1	2		
Leszek Tokarz	1	1972	5	3	0	3	6		
Wiesław Tokarz	1	1972	3	0	0	0	0		
Mirosław Tomasik	1	1992	7	1	3	4	2		
Zdzisław Trojanowski	1	1952	6	1	0	1	0		
Aleksander Tupalski	1	1928	2	3	0	3	0		
Andrzej Ujwary	2	1980, 1984	9	0	1	1	4		
Maksymilian Więcek	1	1948	3	0	0	0	0		
Sławomir Wieloch	1	1992	7	0	0	0	2		
Sylwester Wilczek	1	1964	7	2	4	6	2		
Andrzej Wołkowski	1	1936	3	3	0	3	0		
Adolf Wróbel	1	1956	5	0	0	0	2		
Alfred Wróbel	2	1952, 1956	12	2	0	2	2		
Antoni Wróbel	1	1952	6	2	0	2	0		
Andrzej Zabawa	3	1976, 1980, 1984	15	7	7	14	4		
Janusz Zawadzki	1	1956	1	0	0	0	4		
Kazimierz Żebrowski	1	1928	1	0	0	0	0		
Ernest Ziaja	1	1948	1	0	0	0	0		
Edmund Zieliński	1	1936	3	2	0	2	0		
Walenty Ziętara	2	1972, 1976	9	0	1	1	6		
Andrzej Żurawski	1	1964	7	1	3	4	6		
Karol Żurek	1	1976	4	0	0	0	2		
