= List of Olympic men's ice hockey players for Italy =

The list of Olympic men's ice hockey players for Italy consisted of 141 skaters and 17 goaltenders (check numbers; not right). Men's ice hockey tournaments have been staged at the Olympic Games since 1920 (it was introduced at the 1920 Summer Olympics, and was permanently added to the Winter Olympic Games in 1924). Italy has participated in ten tournaments, the first in 1936 and most recently in 2026. Italy has never finished higher than seventh at the Olympics, which they achieved at the 1956 Winter Olympics. Their lowest finish was fifteenth, of sixteen teams, in 1964.

Lucio Topatigh has played in the most Olympic tournaments, 4, and also played in the most games, 23. Bruno Zarrillo has scored the most goals, 10, and points, 15, while Gaetano Orlando has the most assists, 8.

== Key ==
General terms
Term	Definition
GP	Games played
Olympics	Number of Olympic Games tournaments
Ref(s)	Reference(s)

Goaltender statistical abbreviations
Abbreviation	Definition
W	Wins
L	Losses
T	Ties
Min	Minutes played
SO	Shutouts
GA	Goals against
GAA	Goals against average

Skater statistical abbreviations
Abbreviation	Definition
G	Goals
A	Assists
P	Points
PIM	Penalty minutes

== Goaltenders ==
Goaltenders
Player	Olympics	Tournament(s)	GP	W	L	T	Min	SO	GA	GAA	Notes	Ref(s)
Vittorio Bolla	2	1956, 1964	13	5	6	2	–	–	–	–		
Mario Brunetta	1	1998	1	0	1	0	–	–	–	–		
Bruno Campese	1	1994	4	2	2	0	–	–	–	–		
Marco Capone	1	1984	4	1	3	0	–	–	–	–		
Damian Clara	1	2026	4	0	4	0	152	0	13	5.13		
David Delfino	2	1992, 1994	9	2	7	0	–	–	–	–		
Davide Fadani	1	2026	34	0	0	0	83	0	8	5.76		
Giuliano Ferraris	1	1956	6	3	1	2	–	–	–	–		
Roberto Gamper	1	1964	1	1	0	0	–	–	–	–		
Augusto Gerosa	1	1936	3	1	2	0	–	–	–	–		
Günther Hell	1	2006	2	0	2	0	–	–	–	–		
Constanzo Mangini	1	1948	3	0	3	0	–	–	–	–		
Jason Muzzatti	1	2006	4	0	2	2	–	–	–	–		
Mike Rosati	2	1994, 1998	6	1	5	0	–	–	–	–		
Adriano Tancon	1	1984	3	1	2	0	–	–	–	–		
Mike Zanier	1	1992	3	0	3	0	–	–	–	–		
Gianantonio Zopegni	1	1948	4	0	4	0	–	–	–	–		

== Skaters ==
Skaters
Player	Olympics	Tournaments	GP	G	A	P	PIM	Medals	Notes	Ref(s)
Giancarlo Agazzi	2	1956, 1964	14	5	2	7	12			
Reno Alberton	1	1956	5	1	0	1	2			
Isidoro Alverà	1	1964	7	1	0	0	0			
Luca Ansoldi	1	2006	5	0	0	0	10			
Claudio Apollonio	1	1948	3	0	0	0	0			
Enrico Bacher	1	1964	8	3	1	4	6			
Gianmario Baroni	1	1936	1	0	0	0	0			
Christopher Bartolone	1	1998	4	0	1	1	2			
Giancarlo Bassi	1	1948	5	0	1	1	0			
Mario Bedogni	2	1948, 1956	9	3	1	4	2			
John Bellio	1	1984	5	1	1	2	4			
Enrico Benedetti	1	1964	8	1	0	1	2			
Luigi Bestagini	1	1948	7	0	0	0	0			
Chad Biafore	1	1998	4	0	1	1	6			
Christian Borgatello	1	2006	5	1	0	1	4			
Matt Bradley	1	2026	4	2	0	2	0			
Giampiero Branduardi	2	1956, 1964	13	2	0	2	6			
Patrick Brugnoli	2	1994, 1998	11	1	0	1	2			
Markus Brunner	1	1998	4	0	0	0	4			
Giancarlo Bucchetti	1	1948	3	0	0	0	0			
Carlo Bulgheroni	1	1948	7	1	0	1	0			
Joe Busillo	2	1998, 2006	9	1	2	3	10			
Jim Camazzola	2	1992, 1994	14	2	4	6	22			
Mario Chitarroni	2	1998, 2006	9	2	1	3	18			
Gerard Ciarcia	1	1984	5	1	0	1	10			
Anthony Circelli	2	1992, 1994	14	0	3	3	16			
Jason Cirone	1	2006	5	1	1	2	6			
Georg Comploi	1	1992	7	0	0	0	2			
Ernesto Crotti	1	1956	6	4	7	11	0			
Luigi Da Corte	1	1994	6	0	0	0	0			
Alberto Da Rin	1	1964	8	5	1	6	0			
Gianfranco Da Rin	2	1956, 1964	13	2	0	2	2			
Michael De Angelis	3	1992, 1994, 1998	18	0	3	3	26			
Giorgio de Bettin	1	2006	5	0	4	4	0			
Tommaso de Luca	1	2026	4	0	0	0	0			
Roberto De Piero	1	1984	5	0	1	1	4			
Lino De Toni	1	1994	7	1	0	1	0			
Manuel De Toni	1	2006	5	0	0	0	2			
Phil Di Gaetano	2	1994	7	1	0	1	8			
Dylan Di Perna	1	2026	4	0	0	0	2			
Gregory Di Tomaso	1	2026	4	0	0	0	2			
Cristiano DiGiacinto	1	2026	3	0	0	0	2			
Ignazio Dionisi	2	1936, 1948	7	2	0	2	0			
Arnaldo Fabris	1	1948	8	0	0	0	0			
Vincenzo Fardella	1	1948	7	3	0	3	0			
Cary Farelli	1	1984	5	2	2	4	0			
Aldo Federici	2	1948, 1956	9	8	0	8	2			
Dino Felicetti	1	1998	4	2	0	2	2			
Stephan Figliuzzi	2	1994, 1998	11	6	4	10	6			
Joe Foglietta	1	1992	7	6	1	7	2			
Nicola Fontanive	1	2006	3	0	0	0	2			
Luca Frigo	1	2026	4	1	0	1	2			
Bruno Frison	1	1964	7	4	0	4	4			
Mats Frycklund	1	2026	4	0	0	0	6			
Giovanni Furlani	1	1956	6	1	2	3	2			
Norbert Gasser	1	1984	5	0	0	0	6			
Dustin Gazley	1	2026	4	1	2	3	2			
Umberto Gerli	1	1948	7	2	0	2	0			
Bruno Ghedina	1	1964	7	0	0	0	2			
Ivo Ghezze	1	1964	6	0	0	0	0			
Robert Ginnetti	1	1992	7	2	0	2	6			
Daniel Glira	1	2026	4	0	0	0	2			
Grant Goegan	1	1984	5	3	1	4	4			
Alexander Gschliesser	1	1994	5	0	0	0	0			
Armin Helfer	1	2006	5	0	0	0	4			
Dino Innocenti	1	1948	6	4	0	4	0			
Adolf Insam	1	1984	5	0	0	0	0			
Leo Insam	2	1994, 1998	6	0	1	1	0			
Tony Iob	1	2006	5	2	2	4	2			
Emilio Iovio	2	1992, 1994	13	4	1	5	0			
Fabrizio Kasslatter	1	1984	5	1	0	1	0			
Diego Kostner	1	2026	3	0	0	0	0			
Erwin Kostner	1	1984	5	0	0	0	0			
Thomas Larkin	1	2026	4	0	2	2	6			
Carlo Lorenzi	1	2006	1	0	0	0	0			
Francesco Macchietto	2	1956, 1964	14	1	1	2	0			
Mario Maiocchi	1	1936	3	0	0	0	0			
Michael Mair	1	1984	5	1	2	3	2			
Aldo Maniacco	1	1956	6	5	7	12	8			
Bob Manno	1	1992	7	1	2	3	22			
Maurizio Mansi	2	1994, 1998	11	2	2	4	12			
Daniel Mantenuto	1	2026	4	0	0	0	2			
Giovanni Marchetti	1	1992	7	0	0	0	6			
Stefano Margoni	2	1998, 2006	9	0	0	0	0			
Giovanni Mastel	1	1964	3	0	0	0	0			
Mike Mastrullo	1	1984	5	1	0	1	0			
Dino Menardi	1	1948	3	1	0	1	0			
Ico Migliore	1	1984	5	0	2	2	2			
Thomas Milani	1	1984	5	1	2	3	2			
Carlo Montemurro	1	1956	6	2	1	3	18			
Giovanni Morini	1	2026	4	0	0	0	0			
Rick Morocco	1	1992	7	2	1	3	6			
Camillo Mussi	1	1936	3	0	0	0	0			
Bob Nardella	2	1998, 2006	9	0	3	3	12			
Frank Nigro	1	1992	7	0	3	3	6			
Giulio Oberhammer	2	1956, 1964	13	3	0	3	0			
Robert Oberrauch	3	1992, 1994, 1998	18	0	2	2	20			
Gaetano Orlando	2	1994, 1998	11	4	8	12	8			
John Parco	1	2006	5	3	1	4	10			
Gino Pasqualotto	1	1984	5	0	0	0	0			
Martin Pavlu	3	1984, 1994, 1998	17	5	2	7	0			
Santino Pellegrino	1	1992	6	2	1	3	0			
Alex Petan	1	2026	3	0	0	0	0			
Phil Pietroniro	1	2026	4	0	2	2	0			
Constant Priondolo	1	1984	4	0	4	4	2			
Norbert Prünster	1	1984	3	0	0	0	0			
Tommy Purdeller	1	2026	3	0	0	0	2			
Edmondo Rabanser	1	1964	8	1	1	2	0			
Florian Ramoser	1	2006	5	0	0	0	10			
Roland Ramoser	2	1994, 1998	11	2	3	5	10			
Otto Rauth	1	1948	7	4	0	0	0			
Franco Rossi	2	1936, 1948	7	0	0	0	0			
Larry Rucchin	1	1998	4	0	0	0	4			
Vezio Sacratini	1	1994	7	0	1	1	10			
Nick Saracino	1	2026	3	0	0	0	0			
Giulio Scandella	1	2006	2	0	1	1	0			
Marco Scapinello	1	1992	6	0	0	0	0			
Giovanni Scotti	1	1936	3	1	0	1	0			
Jason Seed	1	2026	4	0	0	0	2			
Alessandro Segafredo	1	2026	2	0	0	0	0			
Andrè Signoretti	1	2006	4	0	0	0	2			
Martino Soracreppa	1	1992	7	0	0	0	0			
Bill Stewart	2	1992, 1994	14	0	3	3	12			
Michele Strazzabosco	1	2006	5	0	0	0	10			
David Tomassoni	1	1984	5	1	1	2	2			
Bernardo Tomei	1	1956	6	5	0	5	4			
Lucio Topatigh	4	1992, 1994, 1998, 2006	23	5	4	9	22			
Carter Trevisani	1	2006	5	1	0	1	8			
Alex Trivellato	1	2026	4	0	0	0	0			
Decio Trovati	1	1936	2	0	0	0	00			
Carmine Tucci	1	1956	6	2	1	3	6			
Tony Tuzzolino	1	2006	4	0	1	1	32			
John Vecchiarelli	1	1992	7	1	3	4	8			
Giulio Verocai	1	1964	8	0	1	1	6			
Ivano Zanatta	1	1992	7	0	2	2	2			
Luca Zanatta	1	2026	4	0	0	0	0			
Marco Zanetti	1	2026	3	0	0	0	4			
Bruno Zarrillo	3	1992, 1994, 1998	18	10	5	15	18			
Stefan Zisser	1	2006	5	0	0	0	2			
Luigi Zucchini	1	1936	3	0	0	0	0			
Mario Zucchini	1	1936	3	1	1	2	0			
