= Italy at the 1984 Winter Olympics =

- IOC code: ITA
- NOC: Italian National Olympic Committee
- Website: www.coni.it (in Italian)

in Sarajevo
- Competitors: 74 (59 men, 15 women) in 9 sports
- Flag bearer: Paul Hildgartner (luge)
- Medals Ranked 10th: Gold 2 Silver 0 Bronze 0 Total 2

Winter Olympics appearances (overview)
- 1924; 1928; 1932; 1936; 1948; 1952; 1956; 1960; 1964; 1968; 1972; 1976; 1980; 1984; 1988; 1992; 1994; 1998; 2002; 2006; 2010; 2014; 2018; 2022; 2026

Italy competed at the 1984 Winter Olympics in Sarajevo, Yugoslavia (now Bosnia and Herzegovina).

== Medalists ==
Medal	Name	Sport	Event	Date
Gold	Paul Hildgartner	Luge	Men's singles	12 February
Gold	Paoletta Magoni	Alpine skiing	Women's slalom	17 February

== Alpine skiing ==
Men

Athlete	Event	Race 1		Race 2		Total	
Athlete	Event	Time	Rank	Time	Rank	Time	Rank
Danilo Sbardellotto	Downhill					1:48.06	20
Alberto Ghidoni	Downhill					1:47.87	16
Michael Mair	Downhill					1:47.70	15
Alberto Ghidoni	Giant Slalom	DNF	–	–	–	DNF	–
Oswald Tötsch	Giant Slalom	1:22.94	16	1:22.03	13	2:44.97	15
Roberto Erlacher	Giant Slalom	1:22.36	13	1:21.73	12	2:44.09	12
Alex Giorgi	Giant Slalom	1:22.05	9	1:20.95	3	2:43.00	7
Paolo De Chiesa	Slalom	DNF	–	–	–	DNF	–
Roberto Grigis	Slalom	53.19	12	DNF	–	DNF	–
Oswald Tötsch	Slalom	52.81	7	47.67	1	1:40.48	5
Alex Giorgi	Slalom	51.96	4	DNF	–	DNF	–

Women

Athlete	Event	Race 1		Race 2		Total	
Athlete	Event	Time	Rank	Time	Rank	Time	Rank
Paoletta Magoni	Giant Slalom	1:12.56	36	1:15.31	32	2:27.87	32
Fulvia Stevenin	Giant Slalom	1:12.09	29	DNF	–	DNF	–
Daniela Zini	Giant Slalom	1:12.07	28	1:14.26	25	2:26.33	25
Fulvia Stevenin	Slalom	DNF	–	–	–	DNF	–
Maria Rosa Quario	Slalom	49.68	13	48.31	2	1:37.99	7
Daniela Zini	Slalom	49.32	8	48.83	8	1:38.15	9
Paoletta Magoni	Slalom	48.85	4	47.62	1	1:36.47	1st place, gold medalist(s)

== Biathlon ==
Men

Event	Athlete	Misses ^{1}	Time	Rank
10 km Sprint	Johann Passler	4	34:31.4	35
10 km Sprint	Andreas Zingerle	5	34:07.5	29
10 km Sprint	Gottlieb Taschler	1	33:04.9	19

Event	Athlete	Time	Penalties	Adjusted time ^{2}	Rank
20 km	Adriano Darioli	1'13:14.0	8	1'21:14.0	28
20 km	Marco Zanon	1'15:59.9	4	1'19:59.9	19
20 km	Andreas Zingerle	1'12:21.7	4	1'16:21.7	9

Men's 4 x 7.5 km relay

Athletes	Race		
Athletes	Misses ^{1}	Time	Rank
Adriano Darioli; Gottlieb Taschler; Johann Passler; Andreas Zingerle	0	1'42:32.8	5

^{1} A penalty loop of 150 metres had to be skied per missed target.
^{2} One minute added per missed target.

== Bobsleigh ==
Sled	Athletes	Event	Run 1		Run 2		Run 3		Run 4		Total	
Sled	Athletes	Event	Time	Rank	Time	Rank	Time	Rank	Time	Rank	Time	Rank
ITA-1	Guerrino Ghedina; Andrea Meneghin	Two-man	52.40	9	52.46	8	51.82	6	52.41	9	3:29.09	7
ITA-2	Marco Bellodis; Stefano Ticci	Two-man	52.69	11	52.73	9	52.28	11	52.32	7	3:30.02	9

Sled	Athletes	Event	Run 1		Run 2		Run 3		Run 4		Total	
Sled	Athletes	Event	Time	Rank	Time	Rank	Time	Rank	Time	Rank	Time	Rank
ITA-1	Alex Wolf; Georg Beikircher; Pasquale Gesuito; Umberto Prato	Four-man	51.12	16	51.19	12	51.57	17	51.63	17	3:25.51	17
ITA-2	Guerrino Ghedina; Stefano Ticci; Paolo Scaramuzza; Andrea Meneghin	Four-man	50.66	8	50.93	6	51.00	6	51.18	7	3:23.77	8

== Cross-country skiing ==
Men

Event	Athlete	Race	
Event	Athlete	Time	Rank
15 km	Gianfranco Polvara	44:35.7	34
15 km	Giulio Capitanio	43:50.8	24
15 km	Giorgio Vanzetta	42:54.9	14
15 km	Maurilio De Zolt	42:40.0	9
30 km	Alfred Runggaldier	DSQ	–
30 km	Giulio Capitanio	1'34:22.6	26
30 km	Giorgio Vanzetta	1'33:54.3	24
30 km	Maurilio De Zolt	1'31:58.7	9
50 km	Giulio Capitanio	2'28:51.7	34
50 km	Giorgio Vanzetta	2'27:08.3	30
50 km	Maurilio De Zolt	2'25:14.9	22
50 km	Gianfranco Polvara	2'25:07.5	21

Men's 4 × 10 km relay

Athletes	Race	
Athletes	Time	Rank
Maurilio De Zolt; Alfred Runggaldier; Giulio Capitanio; Giorgio Vanzetta	1'59:30.3	7

Women

Event	Athlete	Race	
Event	Athlete	Time	Rank
5 km	Paola Pozzoni	18:51.9	33
5 km	Clara Angerer	18:47.9	31
5 km	Guidina Dal Sasso	18:24.9	24
5 km	Manuela Di Centa	18:24.9	24
10 km	Clara Angerer	35:31.1	35
10 km	Paola Pozzoni	35:30.8	34
10 km	Manuela Di Centa	34:41.6	28
10 km	Guidina Dal Sasso	33:48.2	16
20 km	Germana Sperotto	1'10:24.1	35
20 km	Manuela Di Centa	1'07:10.5	26
20 km	Guidina Dal Sasso	1'04:44.1	10

Women's 4 × 5 km relay

Athletes	Race	
Athletes	Time	Rank
Clara Angerer; Paola Pozzoni; Manuela Di Centa; Guidina Dal Sasso	1'11:12.3	9

== Figure skating ==
Women

Athlete	CF	SP	FS	TFP	Rank
Karin Telser	11	15	16	28.6	15

Ice Dancing

Athletes	CD	OD	FD	TFP	Rank
Isabella Micheli; Roberto Pelizzola	15	15	14	29.0	15

== Ice hockey ==
=== Group A ===
Top two teams (shaded ones) advanced to the medal round.

Team	Pld	W	L	T	GF	GA	Pts
Soviet Union	5	5	0	0	42	5	10
Sweden	5	3	1	1	34	15	7
West Germany	5	3	1	1	27	17	7
Poland	5	1	4	0	16	37	2
Italy	5	1	4	0	15	31	2
Yugoslavia	5	1	4	0	8	37	2

- Sweden 11-3 Italy
- USSR 5-1 Italy
- Italy 6-1 Poland
- Yugoslavia 5-1 Italy
- West Germany 9-4 Italy

Contestants; Lodovico Migliori; Thomas Milani; Martin Pavlu; Norbert Prünster; Adolf Insam; Adriano Tancon; Constant Priondolo; David Tomassoni; Erwin Kostner; Fabrizio Kasslatter; Gary Farelli; Gerard Ciarcia; Gino Pasqualott; Grant Goegan; John Bellio; Marco Capone; Michael Mair; Mike Mastrullo; Norbert Gasser; Roberto De Piero

== Luge ==
Men

Athlete	Run 1		Run 2		Run 3		Run 4		Total	
Athlete	Time	Rank	Time	Rank	Time	Rank	Time	Rank	Time	Rank
Norbert Huber	46.888	14	46.629	10	46.265	4	46.127	4	3:05.909	9
Paul Hildgartner	46.182	3	46.271	2	45.871	1	45.934	1	3:04.258	1st place, gold medalist(s)
Ernst Haspinger	46.157	1	46.562	7	46.438	8	46.170	5	3:05.327	6

(Men's) Doubles

Athletes	Run 1		Run 2		Total	
Athletes	Time	Rank	Time	Rank	Time	Rank
Hansjörg Raffl; Norbert Huber	42.369	9	41.984	6	1:24.353	6
Helmuth Brunner; Walter Brunner	42.039	5	42.749	11	1:24.788	10

Women

Athlete	Run 1		Run 2		Run 3		Run 4		Total	
Athlete	Time	Rank	Time	Rank	Time	Rank	Time	Rank	Time	Rank
Monika Auer	44.466	23	42.830	13	41.910	4	42.070	9	2:51.276	13
Veronika Oberhuber	43.466	15	42.534	9	42.192	8	42.037	8	2:50.229	11
Maria Luise Rainer	42.560	7	42.320	6	42.330	12	41.928	6	2:49.138	6

== Ski jumping ==
Athlete	Event	Jump 1		Jump 2		Total	
Athlete	Event	Distance	Points	Distance	Points	Points	Rank
Sandro Sambugaro	Normal hill	72.5	75.5	78.5	86.1	161.6	43
Massimo Rigoni	Normal hill	78.0	87.3	85.0	103.0	190.3	16
Lido Tomasi	Normal hill	87.0	101.7	78.0	86.3	188.0	21
Sandro Sambugaro	Large hill	88.0	68.9	88.0	69.4	138.3	44
Massimo Rigoni	Large hill	92.0	78.5	94.0	80.8	159.3	34
Lido Tomasi	Large hill	100.5	91.9	88.0	69.4	161.3	33

== Speed skating ==
Men

Event	Athlete	Race	
Event	Athlete	Time	Rank
500 m	Giorgio Paganin	40.54	33
1000 m	Giorgio Paganin	1:20.89	32
1500 m	Giorgio Paganin	2:04.97	35
5000 m	Maurizio Marchetto	7:36.87	22
10,000 m	Maurizio Marchetto	15:19.77	20

Women

Event	Athlete	Race	
Event	Athlete	Time	Rank
500 m	Marzia Peretti	43.63	17
1000 m	Marzia Peretti	1:30.33	33
