= Poland at the 1984 Winter Olympics =

- IOC code: POL
- NOC: Polish Olympic Committee
- Website: www.pkol.pl (in Polish)

in Sarajevo
- Competitors: 30 (24 men, 6 women) in 6 sports
- Flag bearers: Józef Łuszczek, cross-country skiing
- Medals: Gold 0 Silver 0 Bronze 0 Total 0

Winter Olympics appearances (overview)
- 1924; 1928; 1932; 1936; 1948; 1952; 1956; 1960; 1964; 1968; 1972; 1976; 1980; 1984; 1988; 1992; 1994; 1998; 2002; 2006; 2010; 2014; 2018; 2022; 2026

Poland competed at the 1984 Winter Olympics in Sarajevo, Yugoslavia.

== Alpine skiing ==
Women

| Athlete | Event | Run 1 | | Run 2 | | Total | |
| Athlete | Event | Time | Rank | Time | Rank | Time | Rank |
|---|---|---|---|---|---|---|---|
| Ewa Grabowska | Giant slalom | 1:12.45 | 34 | 1:15.10 | 31 | 2:27.55 | 33 |
| Ewa Grabowska | Slalom | 50.06 | 15 | 49.56 | 14 | 1:39.62 | 13 |
| Dorota Tłalka-Mogore | Giant slalom | 1:11.91 | 25 | 1:14.99 | 30 | 2:26.90 | 30 |
| Dorota Tłalka-Mogore | Slalom | DNF | – | – | – | DNF | – |
| Małgorzata Tłalka-Mogore | Slalom | 49.20 | 6 | 48.77 | 7 | 1:37.97 | 6 |

== Cross-country skiing ==
Men

| Athlete | Event | Final | |
| Athlete | Event | Time | Rank |
|---|---|---|---|
| Józef Łuszczek | 15 km | 45:04.8 | 36 |
| Józef Łuszczek | 30 km | 1.38:11.7 | 41 |
| Józef Łuszczek | 50 km | 2.25:46.9 | 27 |

== Figure skating ==
| Athlete | Event | CF | SP | FS | TFP | Rank |
|---|---|---|---|---|---|---|
| Grzegorz Filipowski | Men's | 12 | 12 | 15 | 27.0 | 12 |

== Ice hockey ==
=== Group A ===
Top two teams (shaded ones) advanced to the medal round.

| Team | Pld | W | L | T | GF | GA | Pts |
|---|---|---|---|---|---|---|---|
| Soviet Union | 5 | 5 | 0 | 0 | 42 | 5 | 10 |
| Sweden | 5 | 3 | 1 | 1 | 34 | 15 | 7 |
| West Germany | 5 | 3 | 1 | 1 | 27 | 17 | 7 |
| Poland | 5 | 1 | 4 | 0 | 16 | 37 | 2 |
| Italy | 5 | 1 | 4 | 0 | 15 | 31 | 2 |
| Yugoslavia | 5 | 1 | 4 | 0 | 8 | 37 | 2 |

- USSR 12-1 Poland
- West Germany 8-5 Poland
- Italy 6-1 Poland
- Sweden 10-1 Poland
- Poland 8-1 Yugoslavia

=== Game for 7th Place ===
| Team 1 | Score | Team 2 |
|---|---|---|
| United States | 7–4 | Poland |

| Contestants; Andrzej Chowaniec; Andrzej Hachuła; Andrzej Ujwary; Andrzej Zabawa; Andrzej Nowak; Gabriel Samolej; Henryk Gruth; Henryk Pytel; Jan Piecko; Jan Stopczyk; Janusz Adamiec; Jerzy Christ; Krystian Sikorski; Leszek Jachna; Ludwik Synowiec; Marek Cholewa; Robert Szopiński; Stanisław Klocek; Wiesław Jobczyk; Włodzimierz Olszewski |

== Ski jumping ==
| Athlete | Event | Jump 1 | | Jump 2 | | Total | |
| Athlete | Event | Distance | Points | Distance | Points | Points | Rank |
|---|---|---|---|---|---|---|---|
| Piotr Fijas | Normal hill | 87.0 | 103.2 | 88.0 | 101.3 | 204.5 | 7 |
| Piotr Fijas | Large hill | 103.0 | 96.9 | 95.0 | 83.7 | 180.6 | 17 |
| Janusz Malik | Normal hill | 78.0 | 85.8 | 82.5 | 95.0 | 180.8 | 30 |
| Janusz Malik | Large hill | 85.0 | 65.2 | 84.0 | 62.3 | 127.5 | 46 |

== Speed skating ==
Women

| Athlete | Event | Final | |
| Athlete | Event | Time | Rank |
|---|---|---|---|
| Lilianna Morawiec | 500 m | 43.43 | 15 |
| Lilianna Morawiec | 1000 m | 1:26.53 | 10 |
| Lilianna Morawiec | 1500 m | 2:39.37 | 30 |
| Erwina Ryś-Ferens | 500 m | 42.71 | 9 |
| Erwina Ryś-Ferens | 1000 m | 1:25.81 | 7 |
| Erwina Ryś-Ferens | 1500 m | 2:08.08 | 5 |
| Erwina Ryś-Ferens | 3000 m | 4:42.90 | 14 |
| Zofia Tokarczyk | 500 m | 43.13 | 14 |
| Zofia Tokarczyk | 1000 m | 1:26.95 | 14 |
