= Paganin =

Paganin is an Italian surname. Notable people with the surname include:

- Antonio Paganin (born 1966), Italian footballer
- Giorgio Paganin (born 1962), Italian speed skater
- Giovanni Paganin (born 1955), Italian speed skater
- Massimo Paganin (born 1970), Italian footballer
