= Nerell =

Nerell is a surname. Notable people with the surname include:

- Erik Nerell (born 1964), Norwegian ice hockey player
- Hans Nerell (born 1944), Swedish tennis player
- Ida-Theres Karlsson-Nerell (born 1983), Swedish freestyle wrestler
- Loren Nerell (1960–2026), American composer and performer
