= Michał Antuszewicz =

Polish ice hockey player

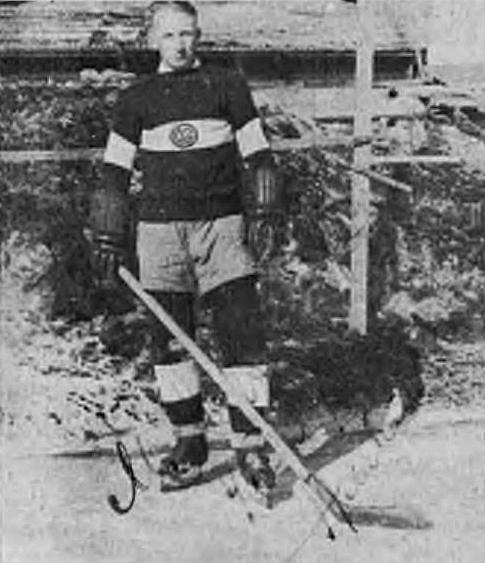
- Antuszewicz in 1937
- Born: 1 October 1909; Harbin, China
- Died: 10 March 1993 (aged 83); Warsaw, Poland
- Height: 5 ft 7 in (170 cm)
- Weight: 160 lb (73 kg; 11 st 6 lb)
- Position: Defence
- Shot: Left
- Played for: Włókniarz Zgierz; Legia Warsaw
- National team: Poland
- Playing career: 1951–1952

Michał “Mandzur” Antuszewicz (1 October 1909 — 10 March 1993) was a Polish ice hockey player. He played for Włókniarz Zgierz and Legia Warsaw in Poland, as well as clubs in Manchuria. Antuszewicz also played for the Polish national team the 1952 Winter Olympics. Born in Harbin, China, his father, Romuald, worked for a Russian railway, moving to the region in the wake of the Russo-Japanese War. His mother, Agata, was an economist and translator. Antuszewicz played for local teams in Manchuria, moving to Poland in 1949. He helped Legia win the Polish league championship in both 1951 and 1952. After his playing career he served as a translator for the Polish delegation at the 1964 Summer Olympics in Tokyo.
