= Giovanni Marchetti (disambiguation) =

Giovanni Marchetti (1753–1829) was an Italian Roman Catholic archbishop.

Giovanni Marchetti may also refer to:

- Giovanni Battista Marchetti (1730–1800), Italian painter
- Giovanni Marchetti (ice hockey) (born 1968), Italian ice hockey player
- Giovanni Matteo Marchetti (1647–1704), Italian Roman Catholic prelate
