= Helmuts Balderis =

Latvian and Soviet ice hockey player (born 1952)

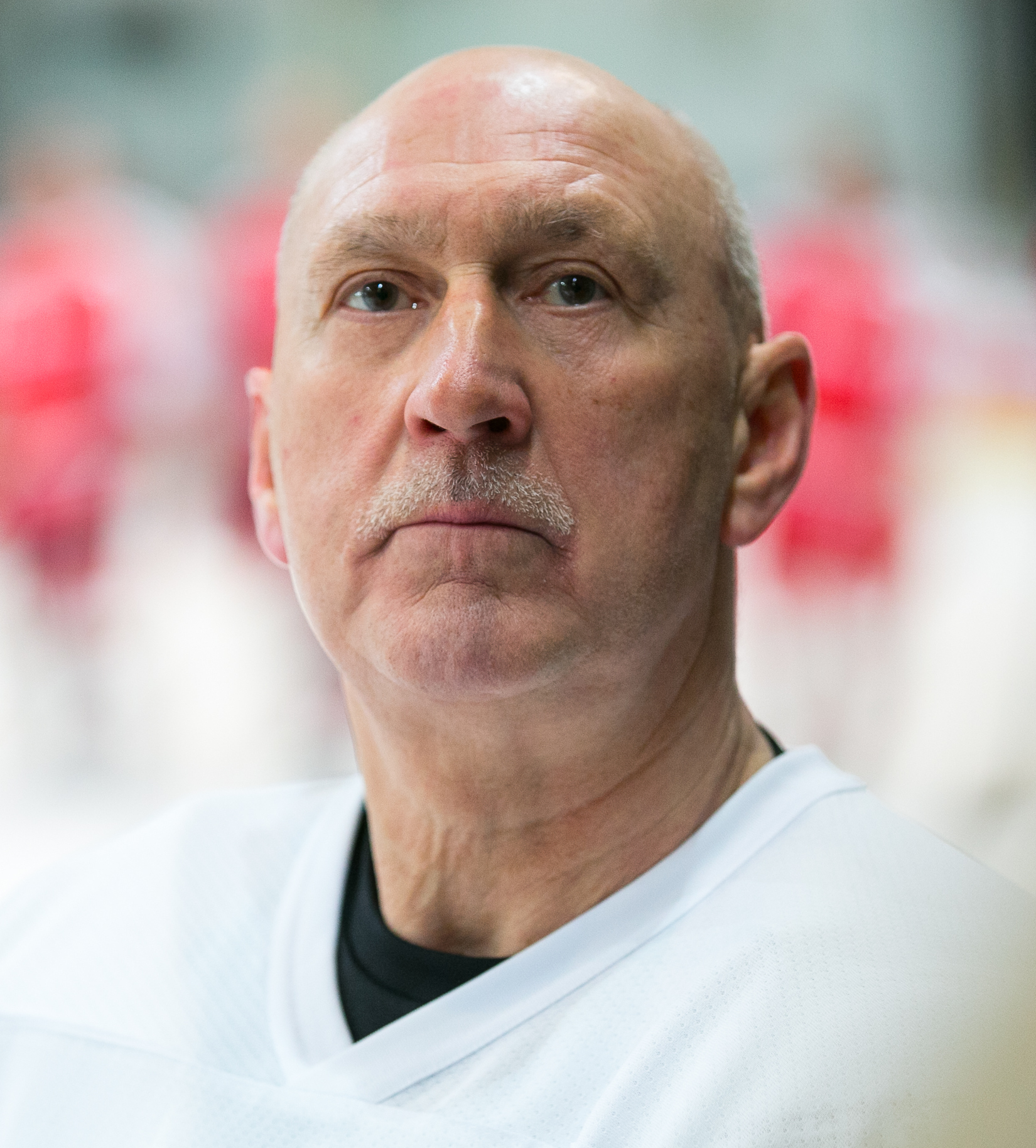
- Balderis in 2014
- Born: 31 July 1952 (age 74) Riga, Latvian SSR, Soviet Union
- Height: 5 ft 11 in (180 cm)
- Weight: 190 lb (86 kg; 13 st 8 lb)
- Position: Right wing
- Shot: Left
- Played for: Dinamo Riga; CSKA Moscow; Minnesota North Stars
- National team: Soviet Union and Latvia
- NHL draft: 238th overall, 1989; Minnesota North Stars
- Playing career: 1973–1985; 1989–1996
Medal record
Representing Soviet Union
Men's ice hockey
Olympic Games
Silver medal – second place	1980 Lake Placid	Ice hockey
World Championships
Gold medal – first place	1978 Czechoslovakia	Ice hockey
Gold medal – first place	1979 Soviet Union	Ice hockey
Gold medal – first place	1983 West Germany	Ice hockey
Bronze medal – third place	1976 Poland	Ice hockey
Bronze medal – third place	1977 Austria	Ice hockey

Helmuts Balderis-Sildedzis (born 31 July 1952) is a Latvian and former Soviet professional ice hockey player. He played on the right wing and participated at the 1980 Winter Olympics, where the Soviet team unexpectedly lost to the United States. He played part of a single season in the National Hockey League after being drafted in 1989 by the Minnesota North Stars, becoming the oldest player to be drafted by an NHL team at the age of 36. In 1998, he was inducted into International Ice Hockey Federation Hall of Fame.

== Playing career ==
Balderis played in the Soviet Hockey League for Dinamo Riga (1969–1977, 1980–1985) and CSKA Moscow (1977–80), having been transferred to the latter as a precondition for being accepted in the Soviet national team. He was the leading scorer in the 1977 and 1984 seasons, winning the Player of the Year award in 1977. He was the best player of the Latvian SSR in the 1970s and 1980s and the most prolific scorer from the republic, tallying 333 goals in Soviet league play.

Balderis played for the Soviet national team at multiple tournaments, winning the silver medal at the 1980 Winter Olympics and gold medals at the World Championships in 1978, 1979 and 1983. Overall, Balderis played in five World Championships (1976–1979, 1983), 1976 Canada Cup and 1980 Winter Olympics. He was named Best Forward in the 1977 World Championships. Balderis was not selected for the USSR's 1984 Olympic team and played in only one major international tournament after he left CSKA Moscow to go back to play for Dinamo Riga in 1980.

In 1985, Balderis retired and became a coach in Japan. He returned in 1989, when Soviet players were allowed to play in the NHL. Balderis was drafted by the Minnesota North Stars, playing 26 games and scoring 3 goals with 6 assists. He became the oldest player drafted by an NHL team (36) and the oldest player to score his first goal (37). He retired again after one season in Minnesota, but came out of retirement for the second time when Latvia regained its independence. Balderis played several games for the newly recreated Latvian national team (in 1992), serving as its captain and scoring 2 goals. He later coached the team and served as its general manager. As of 2017, he serves as a board member of the Latvian Ice Hockey Federation.

== Awards ==
- Soviet league First All-Star Team (1977)
- Izvestia Trophy (Soviet League Top Scorer) (1977, 1983)
- Soviet League Player of the Year (1977)
- World Championships All-Star Team (1977)
- Named Best Forward at the World Championships (1977)
- Leading Scorer of the Latvian League (1993)
- In 1998, he was inducted into International Ice Hockey Federation Hall of Fame.

== Career statistics ==
=== Regular season and playoffs ===
			Regular season					Playoffs
Season	Team	League	GP	G	A	Pts	PIM	GP	G	A	Pts	PIM
1967–68	Dinamo Riga	Soviet II	—	—	—	—	—	—	—	—	—	—
1968–69	Dinamo Riga	Soviet III	—	—	—	—	—	—	—	—	—	—
1969–70	Dinamo Riga	Soviet II	—	12	—	12	—	—	—	—	—	—
1970–71	Dinamo Riga	Soviet II	—	10	—	10	—	—	—	—	—	—
1971–72	Dinamo Riga	Soviet II	—	14	9	23	—	—	—	—	—	—
1972–73	Dinamo Riga	Soviet II	—	27	15	42	—	—	—	—	—	—
1973–74	Dinamo Riga	Soviet	24	9	6	15	13	—	—	—	—	—
1974–75	Dinamo Riga	Soviet	36	34	14	48	20	—	—	—	—	—
1975–76	Dinamo Riga	Soviet	36	31	14	45	18	—	—	—	—	—
1976–77	Dinamo Riga	Soviet	35	40	23	63	57	—	—	—	—	—
1977–78	CSKA Moscow	Soviet	36	17	17	34	30	—	—	—	—	—
1978–79	CSKA Moscow	Soviet	41	24	24	48	53	—	—	—	—	—
1979–80	CSKA Moscow	Soviet	42	26	35	61	21	—	—	—	—	—
1980–81	Dinamo Riga	Soviet	44	26	24	50	28	—	—	—	—	—
1981–82	Dinamo Riga	Soviet	41	24	19	43	48	9	15	5	20	2
1982–83	Dinamo Riga	Soviet	40	32	31	63	39	—	—	—	—	—
1983–84	Dinamo Riga	Soviet	39	24	15	39	18	—	—	—	—	—
1984–85	Dinamo Riga	Soviet	39	31	20	51	52	—	—	—	—	—
1989–90	Minnesota North Stars	NHL	26	3	6	9	2	—	—	—	—	—
1991–92	HK Sāga Ķekava Riga	Latvia	7	23	18	41	27	—	—	—	—	—
1991–92	RSHVM-Energo Riga	CIS III	16	14	12	26	10	—	—	—	—	—
1991–92	Vecmeistars Riga	Latvia	7	23	18	41	27	—	—	—	—	—
1992–93	Latvijas zelts Riga	Latvia	22	76	66	142	16	—	—	—	—	—
1993–94	Latvijas zelts Riga	Latvia	7	9	9	18	39	—	—	—	—	—
1994–95	Essamika Ogre	Latvia	1	0	1	1	0	—	—	—	—	—
1995–96	Essamika Ogre	Latvia	30	18	36	54	—	—	—	—	—	—
Soviet totals			462	333	247	580	399	9	15	5	20	2
Latvia totals			53	126	130	256	—	—	—	—	—	—

=== International ===
Year	Team	Event	GP	G	A	Pts	PIM
1971	Soviet Union	EJC	5	10	1	11	4
1976	Soviet Union	WC	10	3	7	10	6
1976	Soviet Union	CC	5	2	3	5	6
1977	Soviet Union	WC	9	8	7	15	4
1978	Soviet Union	WC	10	9	2	11	8
1979	Soviet Union	WC	8	4	5	9	9
1980	Soviet Union	OLY	7	5	4	9	5
1983	Soviet Union	WC	10	4	5	9	22
Senior totals			59	35	33	68	50

Awards and achievements
Preceded by Vladislav Tretiak	Soviet MVP; 1977	Succeeded by Boris Mikhailov
Preceded by Victor Shalimov	Soviet Scoring Champion; 1977	Succeeded by Vladimir Petrov
Preceded by Sergei Makarov	Soviet Scoring Champion; 1983	Succeeded by Sergei Makarov
Sporting positions
Preceded by –	Latvian national ice hockey team coach 1992–1994	Succeeded by Mihails Beskašnovs
