= Iskrzycki =

Iskrzycki (feminine: Iskrzycka; plural: Iskrzyccy) is a Polish surname. The Russian-language equivalent is Iskritsky.

Notable people with this surname include:

- Andrzej Iskrzycki (born 1951), Polish ice hockey player
- Justyna Iskrzycka (born 1997), Polish sprint canoeist
