= 1955–56 Polska Liga Hokejowa season =

Polish ice hockey season

The 1955–56 Polska Liga Hokejowa season was the 21st season of the Polska Liga Hokejowa, the top level of ice hockey in Poland. Eight teams participated in the league, and Legia Warszawa won the championship.

== Regular season ==
	Club	GP	W	T	L	Goals	Pts
1.	Legia Warszawa	14	14	0	0	128:17	28
2.	Górnik Katowice	13	11	0	2	88:33	24
3.	Start Katowice	14	7	2	5	55:49	16
4.	KS Pomorzanin Toruń	14	6	1	7	60:47	13
5.	Podhale Nowy Targ	14	5	1	8	47:61	11
6.	ŁKS Łódź	14	5	0	9	53:81	10
7.	Gwardia Bydgoszcz	14	3	2	8	36:111	8
8.	Gwardia Katowice	14	0	2	12	36:110	2

The league's top scorer was Hilary Skarżyński of Gornik Katowice with 28 goals.
