= Jerzy Ogórczyk =

Polish ice hockey player

- Born: February 8, 1937; Katowice, Poland
- Died: April 8, 2012 (aged 75); Nürtingen, Germany
- Height: 5 ft 7 in (170 cm)
- Weight: 134 lb (61 kg; 9 st 8 lb)
- Position: Forward
- Played for: Górnik Katowice; Baildon Katowice
- National team: Poland
- Playing career: 1950–1966

Jerzy Ogórczyk (8 February 1937 — 8 April 2012) was a Polish ice hockey player. He played for Górnik Katowice and Baildon Katowice during his career. With Górnik he won the Polish hockey league championship in 1958 and 1960. He also played for the Polish national team at several world championships as well as the 1964 Winter Olympics.
