= Andrzej Słowakiewicz =

Polish ice hockey player

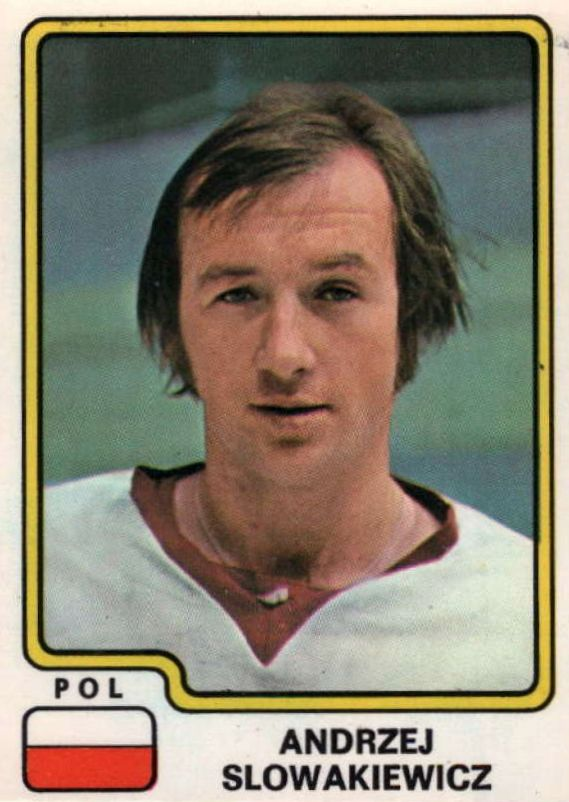
- Born: 22 January 1951 (age 74) Nowy Targ, Poland
- Height: 5 ft 10 in (178 cm)
- Weight: 176 lb (80 kg; 12 st 8 lb)
- Position: Defence
- Played for: Podhale Nowy Targ; Legia Warszawa
- National team: Poland
- NHL draft: Undrafted
- Playing career: 1969–1986

Andrzej Słowakiewicz (born 22 January 1951) is a former Polish ice hockey player. He played for the Poland men's national ice hockey team at the 1976 Winter Olympics in Innsbruck.

He is the younger brother of Józef Słowakiewicz, who played for the Polish national team at the 1972 Winter Olympics.
