= Guerrino Ghedina =

Italian bobsledder (born 1956)

Personal information
- Nationality: Italian
- Born: 11 September 1956 (age 68); Cortina d'Ampezzo, Italy

Sport
- Sport: Bobsleigh

Guerrino Ghedina (born 11 December 1956) is an Italian bobsledder. He competed in the two man and the four man events at the 1984 Winter Olympics.
