= Józef Stogowski =

Polish ice hockey player

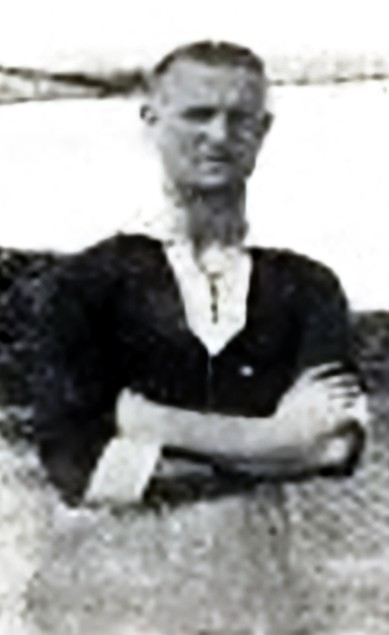
- Stogowski as TKS Toruń's footballer
- Born: 27 November 1899; Toruń, German Empire (Prussian Partition of Poland)
- Died: 14 May 1940 (aged 40); Toruń, Poland under German occupation (Nazi Germany)
- Height: 5 ft 9 in (175 cm)
- Position: Goaltender
- Played for: TKS Toruń; Legia Warsaw; AZS Poznań
- National team: Poland
- Playing career: 1927–1937

Medal record

Ice hockey

Representing Poland

Ice Hockey European Championships
Silver medal – second place	1929 Hungary	
Silver medal – second place	1931 Poland	

Józef Bronisław Stogowski (27 November 1899 – 14 May 1940) was a Polish ice hockey goaltender. He played for TKS Toruń, Legia Warsaw, and AZS Poznań during his hockey career. He also played for the Polish national ice hockey team at the 1928, 1932, and 1936 Winter Olympics. At the 1932 Winter Olympics he was Poland's flag bearer. He helped Poland win silver at the 1929 European Championship. Two years later at the 1931 World Championship, which concurrently served as the European Championship, Stogowski helped Poland again win silver.
