= Dejan Burnik =

- Born: March 25, 1963 (age 61); Ljubljana, Yugoslavia
- Height: 6 ft 0 in (183 cm)
- Weight: 198 lb (90 kg; 14 st 2 lb)
- Position: Defence
- Played for: HDD Olimpija Ljubljana
- National team: Yugoslavia
- NHL draft: Undrafted
- Playing career: 1983–1989

Dejan Burnik (born March 25, 1963) is a former Yugoslav ice hockey player. He played for the Yugoslavia men's national ice hockey team at the 1984 Winter Olympics in Sarajevo.
