= Andrzej Fonfara (ice hockey) =

Polish ice hockey player

- Born: 21 September 1939; Katowice, Poland
- Died: 18 July 2017 (aged 77); Katowice, Poland
- Height: 5 ft 7 in (170 cm)
- Weight: 161 lb (73 kg; 11 st 7 lb)
- Position: Centre
- National team: Poland
- Playing career: 1953–1976

Andrzej Fonfara (21 September 1939 — 18 July 2017), was a Polish ice hockey player. He mainly played for GKS Katowice during his career, as well as the Polish national team at several world championships as well as the 1964 Winter Olympics. He helped Katowice win the Polish league title five times, and later coached the team as well.
