= 1959–60 Polska Liga Hokejowa season =

Polish ice hockey league season

The 1959–60 Polska Liga Hokejowa season was the 25th season of the Polska Liga Hokejowa, the top level of ice hockey in Poland. Eight teams participated in the league, and Gornik Katowice won the championship.

== Regular season ==
	Club	GP	Goals	Pts
1.	Górnik Katowice	14	88:23	28
2.	Legia Warszawa	14	88:23	24
3.	Podhale Nowy Targ	14	63:39	19
4.	KS Pomorzanin Toruń	14	54:68	10
5.	Start Katowice	14	35:70	9
6.	ŁKS Łódź	14	51:64	8
7.	Baildon Katowice	14	44:63	7
8.	KS Cracovia	14	31:104	7
