= 1951–52 Polska Liga Hokejowa season =

Polish ice hockey season

The 1951–52 Polska Liga Hokejowa season was the 17th season of the Polska Liga Hokejowa, the top level of ice hockey in Poland. Eight teams participated in the league, and Legia Warszawa won the championship.

== Final round ==
	Club	GP	Goals	Pts
1.	Legia Warszawa	3	18:3	6
2.	Górnik Janów	3	7:9	4
3.	KTH Krynica	3	10:7	2
4.	Gwardia Katowice	3	3:19	0

== 5th-8th place ==
	Club	GP	Goals	Pts
5.	Ogniwo Kraków	3	18:7	6
6.	Kolejarz Torun	3	11:10	2
7.	ŁKS Łódź	3	10:11	2
8.	KS Budowlani Opole	3	8:19	2
