= Vojko Lajovec =

- Born: March 18, 1962 (age 63); Ljubljana, Yugoslavia
- Position: Defence
- Played for: HDD Olimpija Ljubljana
- National team: Yugoslavia
- NHL draft: Undrafted

Vojko Lajovec (born March 18, 1962) is a former Yugoslav ice hockey player. He played for the Yugoslavia men's national ice hockey team at the 1984 Winter Olympics in Sarajevo.
