= Wojciech Tkacz =

Polish ice hockey player (born 1969)

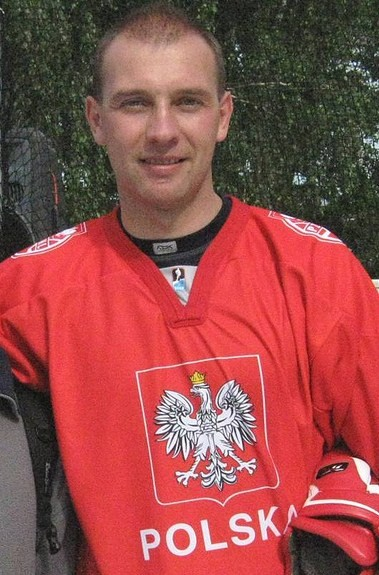
- Tkacz in 2009
- Born: 14 May 1969 (age 57) Katowice, Poland
- Height: 6 ft 0 in (183 cm)
- Weight: 194 lb (88 kg; 13 st 12 lb)
- Position: Centre
- Shot: Left
- Played for: GKS Katowice; Mora IK; Unia Oświęcim; GKS Tychy
- National team: Poland
- Playing career: 1987–2003

Wojciech Maciej Tkacz (born 14 May 1969) is a Polish former ice hockey player. He played for GKS Katowice, Mora IK, Unia Oświęcim, and GKS Tychy during his career. He also played for the Polish national team at the 1992 Winter Olympics, and multiple World Championships. In 1991 Tkacz led the Polish league in scoring.
