= Władysław Pabisz =

Polish ice hockey player

- Born: January 5, 1931; Nowy Sącz, Poland
- Died: March 11, 2007 (aged 76); Krynica-Zdrój, Poland
- Height: 5 ft 7 in (170 cm)
- Weight: 148 lb (67 kg; 10 st 8 lb)
- Position: Goaltender
- Played for: KTH Krynica; Podhale Nowy Targ
- National team: Poland
- Playing career: 1948–1967

Władysław Pabisz (5 January 1931 — 11 March 2007), was a Polish ice hockey goaltender. He played for KTH Krynica and Podhale Nowy Targ during his career. He also played for the Polish national team at the 1956 and 1964 Winter Olympics and several World Championships.

He won the Poland Silver Medal three times during his career; with KTH Krynica in the 1952 - 1953 season, at Podhale Nowy Targ during the 1962 - 1963 season, and again at Podhale Nowy Targ the following season, 1963 - 1964.
