= 1950–51 Polska Liga Hokejowa season =

Polish ice hockey season

The 1950–51 Polska Liga Hokejowa season was the 16th season of the Polska Liga Hokejowa, the top level of ice hockey in Poland. Four teams participated in the final round, and Legia Warszawa won the championship.

== Qualification ==
- Górnik Janów - Kolejarz Torun 7:2/6:5

== Final Tournament ==
	Club	GP	Goals	Pts
1.	Legia Warszawa	3	10:2	6
2.	KTH Krynica	3	11:13	2
3.	Ogniwo Krakau	3	8:11	2
4.	Górnik Janów	3	8:11	2
