= Per-Arne Kristiansen =

Norwegian ice hockey player

Personal information
- Born: 9 September 1959 (age 66) Hamar, Norway

Sport
- Sport: Ice hockey

Per-Arne Kristiansen (born 9 September 1959) is a Norwegian former ice hockey player. He was born in Hamar and played for the club Storhamar IL. He played for the Norwegian national ice hockey team at the 1984 Winter Olympics.
