= Giorgio Paganin =

Italian speed skater

Personal information
- Nationality: Italian
- Born: 24 April 1962 (age 64) Asiago, Italy

Sport
- Sport: Speed skating

Giorgio Paganin (born 24 April 1962) is an Italian speed skater. He competed in three events at the 1984 Winter Olympics.
