= Giovanni Marchetti (ice hockey) =

Italian ice hockey player

Personal information
- Nationality: Italian
- Born: 12 February 1968 (age 57); Cavalese, Italy

Sport
- Sport: Ice hockey

Giovanni Marchetti (born 12 February 1968) is an Italian ice hockey player. He competed in the men's tournament at the 1992 Winter Olympics.
