= Michael Mair (ice hockey) =

Italian ice hockey player

Personal information
- Nationality: Italian
- Born: 31 August 1956 (age 70) Bolzano, Italy

Sport
- Sport: Ice hockey

Michael Mair (born 31 August 1956) is an Italian ice hockey player. He competed in the men's tournament at the 1984 Winter Olympics.
