= Andrzej Iskrzycki =

Polish ice hockey player

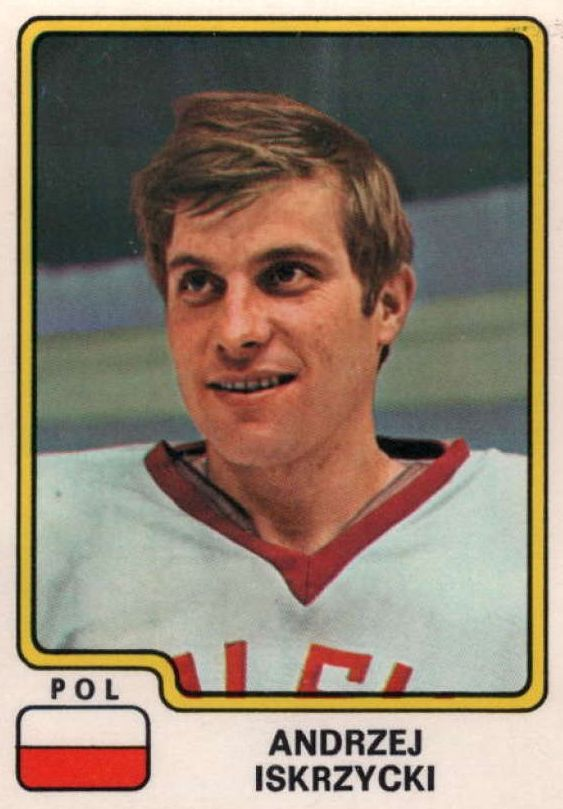
- Born: November 20, 1951 (age 73); Nowy Targ, Poland
- Height: 5 ft 9 in (175 cm)
- Weight: 165 lb (75 kg; 11 st 11 lb)
- Position: Defence
- Played for: Podhale Nowy Targ
- National team: Poland
- NHL draft: Undrafted
- Playing career: 1976–1979

Andrzej Tomasz Iskrzycki (born November 20, 1951) is a former Polish ice hockey player. He played for the Poland men's national ice hockey team at the 1976 Winter Olympics in Innsbruck.
