= Erik Nerell =

Norwegian ice hockey player

Personal information
- Born: 29 January 1964 (age 62) Oslo, Norway

Sport
- Sport: Ice hockey

Erik Nerell (born 29 January 1964) is a Norwegian former ice hockey player. He was born in Oslo, Norway and played for the club IL Manglerud Star. He played for the Norwegian national ice hockey team at the 1984 Winter Olympics.
