= Józef Słowakiewicz =

Polish ice hockey player

- Born: February 17, 1945 (age 80); Nowy Targ, Poland
- Height: 5 ft 8 in (173 cm)
- Weight: 159 lb (72 kg; 11 st 5 lb)
- Position: Forward
- Played for: Podhale Nowy Targ; Legia Warsaw
- National team: Poland
- Playing career: 1963–1977

Józef Jan Słowakiewicz (born 17 February 1945) is a Polish former ice hockey player. He played for Podhale Nowy Targ and Legia Warsaw during his career. With Podhale Słowakiewicz won the Polish hockey league championship eight times. He also played for the Polish national team at several World Championships as well as the 1972 Winter Olympics.
