= Hilary Skarżyński =

Polish ice hockey player

- Born: June 18, 1925 Katowice, Poland
- Died: September 30, 1987 (aged 62) Miami Beach, Florida, United States
- Position: Right wing
- Played for: Siła Giszowiec; HKS Siemianowiczanka; Stal Katowice; Górnik 1920 Katowice
- National team: Poland
- Playing career: 1945–1960

Hilary Skarżyński (18 June 1925 – 30 September 1987) was a Polish ice hockey player. He played for Siła Giszowiec, HKS Siemianowiczanka, Stal Katowice, and Górnik 1920 Katowice during his career. He also played for the Polish national team at the 1948, 1952, and 1956 Winter Olympics, and the 1955 and 1957 World Championship. He died in a car accident in Miami Beach, Florida in 1987.
