= Roberto De Piero =

Italian ice hockey player

Personal information
- Nationality: Italian
- Born: 25 December 1954 (age 70); Thunder Bay, Ontario, Canada

Sport
- Sport: Ice hockey

Roberto "Bob" De Piero (born 25 December 1954) is an Italian ice hockey player. He competed in the men's tournament at the 1984 Winter Olympics.
