= Mike Mastrullo =

Italian ice hockey player (born 1957)

Personal information
- Nationality: Italian
- Born: 5 May 1957 (age 69) Lowell, Massachusetts, United States

Sport
- Sport: Ice hockey

Mike Mastrullo (born 5 May 1957) is an Italian ice hockey player. He competed in the men's tournament at the 1984 Winter Olympics.
