= Martin Pavlu =

Italian ice hockey player

- Born: 8 July 1962 (age 64) Plzeň, Czechoslovakia
- Played for: HC Bolzano; HC Meran/o
- Current coach: Italy (assistant)
- Coached for: Italy U18 (assistant)
- National team: Italy
- Playing career: 1978–2004
- Coaching career: 2019–present

Martin Pavlu (born 8 July 1962) is a Czechoslovak-born Italian former professional ice hockey player and a current assistant coach of the Italian women's national ice hockey team. He represented Italy in the men's tournaments at the 1984 Winter Olympics, the 1994 Winter Olympics, and the 1998 Winter Olympics, and at twelve Ice Hockey World Championships, including seven Top Division (Group A) tournaments.
