= Ludwik Synowiec =

Polish ice hockey player (1958–2022)

- Born: 19 January 1958; Katowice, Poland
- Died: 21 December 2022 (aged 64)
- Height: 5 ft 9 in (175 cm)
- Weight: 185 lb (84 kg; 13 st 3 lb)
- Position: Defence
- Played for: Naprzód Janów; GKS Tychy; Kassel Huskies
- National team: Poland
- NHL draft: Undrafted
- Playing career: 1977–1992

Ludwik Synowiec (19 January 1958 – 21 December 2022) was a Polish ice hockey player. He played for the Poland men's national ice hockey team at the 1980 Winter Olympics in Lake Placid, and the 1984 Winter Olympics in Sarajevo.

Synowiec died on 21 December 2022, at the age of 64.
