= Jerzy Christ =

Polish ice hockey player

- Born: September 15, 1958 (age 66); Katowice, Poland
- Height: 6 ft 1 in (185 cm)
- Weight: 192 lb (87 kg; 13 st 10 lb)
- Position: Forward
- Shot: Left
- Played for: Baildon Katowice; GKS Katowice; Polonia Bytom; Zurcher SC; ECD Sauerland; ERC Westfalen Dortmund 90; Iserholner EC
- National team: Poland
- Playing career: 1983–1997

Jerzy Christ (born September 15, 1958) is a retired Polish ice hockey centre.

== Career ==
Christ played with Baildon Katowice from the start of his career until 1983, he then played one year for GKS Katowice in 1984. For 1984-85, he joined Polonia Bytom, and played for them until joining Zurcher SC of the National League A for part of the 1989 season. Christ then joined ECD Sauerland, and played for them until 1994. He played for ERC Westfalen Dortmund 90 for the 1994-95 season, before joining Iserlohner EC in 1995. Christ played for Iserlohner until he retired in 1997.

Christ participated in the IIHF World Championships in the 1983, 1986, 1987, and 1989 tournaments, and at the Winter Olympics in 1984 and 1988.

== Statistics ==
			Regular season					Playoffs
Season	Team	League	GP	G	A	Pts	PIM	GP	G	A	Pts	PIM
1989-90	ECD Sauerland Iserlohn	2.BL	10	7	13	20	8
1990-91	ECD Sauerland Iserlohn	2.BL	5	2	5	7	4
1991-92	ECD Sauerland Iserlohn	2.BL
1992-93	ECD Sauerland Iserlohn	2.BL
1993-94	ECD Sauerland Iserlohn	2.BL	0	0	0	0	0	0	0	0	0	0
1994-95	ERC Westfalen Dortmund	1.Lg	43	34	25	59	52	2	?	?	?	?
1995-96	Iserlohner EC	1.Lg	43	20	35	55	28	2	2	0	2	0
1996-97	Iserlohner EC	1.Lg	39	6	13	19	18	5	1	1	2	0
2. Bundesliga statistics			140	69	91	160	110	9	3	1	4	0
