= Marco Capone =

Italian ice hockey player

Personal information
- Nationality: Italian
- Born: 22 January 1959 (age 66); Mals, Italy

Sport
- Sport: Ice hockey

Marco Capone (born 22 January 1959) is an Italian ice hockey player. He competed in the men's tournament at the 1984 Winter Olympics.
