= Krystian Sikorski =

Polish ice hockey player

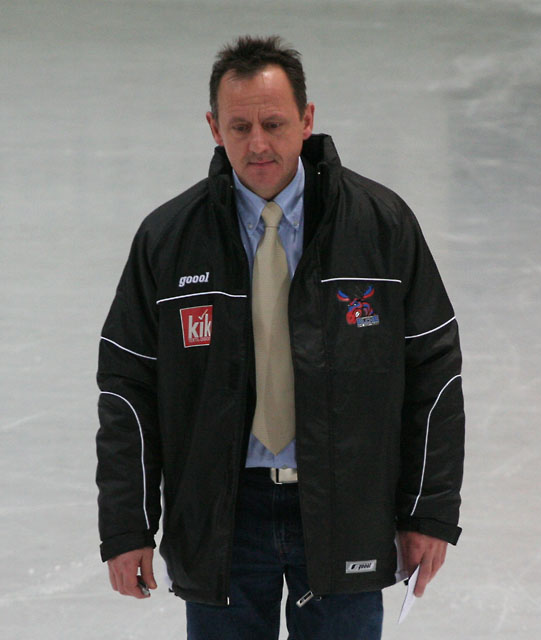
- Born: April 14, 1961 (age 64) Bytom, Poland
- Height: 5 ft 10 in (178 cm)
- Weight: 163 lb (74 kg; 11 st 9 lb)
- Position: Left wing
- Played for: Polonia Bytom
- National team: Poland
- NHL draft: Undrafted
- Playing career: 1983–1990

Krystian Jan Sikorski (born April 14, 1961) is a former Polish ice hockey player. He played for the Poland men's national ice hockey team at the 1984 Winter Olympics in Sarajevo, and the 1988 Winter Olympics in Calgary.
