= Norbert Gasser =

Italian ice hockey player

Personal information
- Nationality: Italian
- Born: 18 May 1957 (age 69) Bolzano, Italy

Sport
- Sport: Ice hockey

Norbert Gasser (born 18 May 1957) is an Italian ice hockey player. He competed in the men's tournament at the 1984 Winter Olympics.
