= Robert Szopiński =

Polish ice hockey player and coach

- Born: February 15, 1961 (age 64); Nowy Targ, Poland
- Height: 6 ft 1 in (185 cm)
- Weight: 198 lb (90 kg; 14 st 2 lb)
- Position: Defence
- Played for: Podhale Nowy Targ; Girondins de Bordeaux; Vikings de Cherbourg
- National team: Poland
- NHL draft: Undrafted
- Playing career: 1980–2000

Robert Wojciech Szopiński (born February 15, 1961) is a former Polish ice hockey player and currently is a coach. He played for the Poland men's national ice hockey team at the 1984 Winter Olympics in Sarajevo, the 1988 Winter Olympics in Calgary, and the 1992 Winter Olympics in Albertville.
