= Gino Pasqualotto =

Italian ice hockey player (1955–2019)

Personal information
- Nationality: Italian
- Born: 10 November 1955 Bolzano, Italy
- Died: 20 June 2019 (aged 63) Bolzano, Italy

Sport
- Sport: Ice hockey

Gino Pasqualotto (10 November 1955 – 20 June 2019), nicknamed Crazy Horse, was an Italian ice hockey player who played the position of defenseman. He competed in the men's tournament at the 1984 Winter Olympics in addition to playing for HC Bozen–Bolzano.
