= Janusz Adamiec =

Polish ice hockey player (born 1962)

- Born: 29 April 1962 (age 62); Katowice, Poland
- Height: 5 ft 9 in (175 cm)
- Weight: 165 lb (75 kg; 11 st 11 lb)
- Position: Right wing
- Played for: Naprzód Janów
- National team: Poland
- NHL draft: Undrafted
- Playing career: 1983–1992

Janusz Andrzej Adamiec (born 29 April 1962) is a former Polish ice hockey player. He played for the Poland men's national ice hockey team at the 1984 Winter Olympics in Sarajevo, the 1988 Winter Olympics in Calgary, and the 1992 Winter Olympics in Albertville.
