= Cary Farelli =

Italian ice hockey player

- Born: 19 June 1957 (age 69) Pembroke, Ontario, Canada
- Height: 5 ft 7 in (170 cm)
- Weight: 174 lb (79 kg; 12 st 6 lb)
- Position: Right wing
- Shot: Left
- Played for: Sault Greyhounds; HC Merano; HC Varese; Asiago Hockey 1935; HC Fiemme Cavalese
- National team: Italy
- NHL draft: 173rd overall, 1977; Montreal Canadiens
- Playing career: 1980–1992

Cary Farelli (born 19 June 1957) is an Italian-Canadian ice hockey player. He competed in the men's tournament at the 1984 Winter Olympics.
