= Gabriel Samolej =

Polish ice hockey player

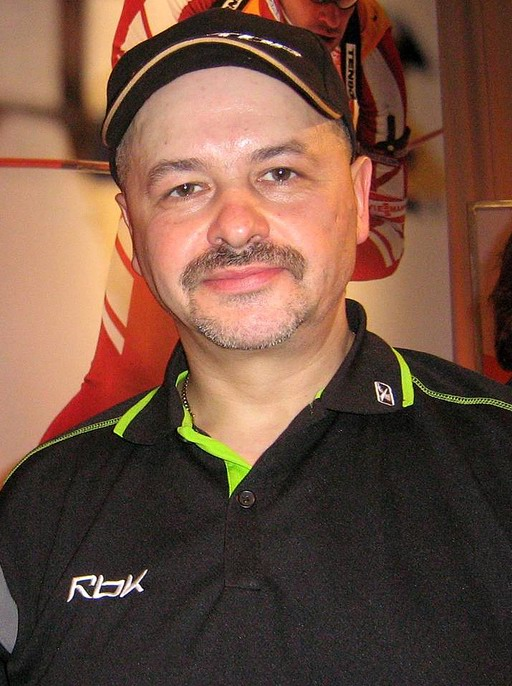
- Born: 1 June 1961 (age 63); Jasło, Poland
- Height: 5 ft 10 in (178 cm)
- Weight: 159 lb (72 kg; 11 st 5 lb)
- Position: Goaltender
- Caught: Left
- Played for: Podhale Nowy Targ
- National team: Poland
- NHL draft: Undrafted
- Playing career: 1989–1993

Gabriel Marian Samolej (born 1 June 1961) is a former Polish ice hockey goaltender. He played for the Poland men's national ice hockey team at the 1984 Winter Olympics in Sarajevo, the 1988 Winter Olympics in Calgary, and the 1992 Winter Olympics in Albertville.
