= John Bellio =

Italian ice hockey player

Personal information
- Nationality: Italian
- Born: 19 December 1954 (age 71) Hamilton, Ontario, Canada

Sport
- Sport: Ice hockey

John Bellio (born 19 December 1954) is an Italian ice hockey player. He competed in the men's tournament at the 1984 Winter Olympics.
