= Andrzej Ujwary =

Polish ice hockey player

- Born: August 21, 1960 (age 64); Nowy Targ, Poland
- Height: 5 ft 11 in (180 cm)
- Weight: 174 lb (79 kg; 12 st 6 lb)
- Position: Defence
- Played for: Podhale Nowy Targ
- National team: Poland
- NHL draft: Undrafted
- Playing career: 1979–1986

Andrzej Ujwary (born August 21, 1960) is a former Polish ice hockey player. He played for the Poland men's national ice hockey team at the 1980 Winter Olympics in Lake Placid, and the 1984 Winter Olympics in Sarajevo.
