= Włodzimierz Olszewski =

Polish ice hockey player

- Born: January 12, 1956 (age 69); Gdańsk, Poland
- Height: 5 ft 10 in (178 cm)
- Weight: 194 lb (88 kg; 13 st 12 lb)
- Position: Goaltender
- Played for: Zaglebie Sosnowiec
- National team: Poland
- NHL draft: Undrafted
- Playing career: 1973–1984

Włodzimierz Zdzisław Olszewski (born January 12, 1956) is a former Polish ice hockey goaltender. He played for the Poland men's national ice hockey team at the 1984 Winter Olympics in Sarajevo.
