= Marek Cholewa =

Polish ice hockey player (born 1963)

- Born: July 1, 1963 (age 63) Sosnowiec, Poland
- Height: 5 ft 9 in (175 cm)
- Weight: 196 lb (89 kg; 14 st 0 lb)
- Position: Defence
- Shot: Left
- Played for: Zaglebie Sosnowiec; Unia Oświęcim
- National team: Poland
- NHL draft: Undrafted
- Playing career: 1986–2006

Marek Piotr Cholewa (born July 1, 1963) is a former Polish ice hockey player. He played for the Poland men's national ice hockey team at the 1984 Winter Olympics in Sarajevo, the 1988 Winter Olympics in Calgary, and the 1992 Winter Olympics in Albertville.
