= Leszek Jachna =

Polish ice hockey player

- Born: May 9, 1958 (age 67) Nowy Targ, Poland
- Height: 5 ft 11 in (180 cm)
- Weight: 161 lb (73 kg; 11 st 7 lb)
- Position: Forward
- Played for: Podhale Nowy Targ, Polonia Bytom, Txuri Urdin San Sebastian
- National team: Poland
- NHL draft: Undrafted
- Playing career: 1979–1991

Leszek Jachna (born May 9, 1958) is a former Polish ice hockey player. He played for the Poland men's national ice hockey team at the 1980 Winter Olympics in Lake Placid, the 1984 Winter Olympics in Sarajevo, and the 1988 Winter Olympics in Calgary.
