= Constant Priondolo =

Italian ice hockey player

Personal information
- Nationality: Italian
- Born: 10 September 1959 (age 67) Montreal, Quebec, Canada

Sport
- Sport: Ice hockey

Constant Priondolo (born 10 September 1959) is an Italian ice hockey player. He competed in the men's tournament at the 1984 Winter Olympics.
