= Norbert Prünster =

Italian ice hockey player

Personal information
- Nationality: Italian
- Born: 6 January 1954 (age 72) Merano, Italy

Sport
- Sport: Ice hockey

Norbert Prünster (born 6 January 1954) is an Italian ice hockey player. He competed in the men's tournament at the 1984 Winter Olympics.
