= Andrzej Hachuła =

Polish ice hockey player (1960–2024)

- Born: 6 August 1960; Katowice, Poland
- Died: 5 November 2024 (aged 64)
- Height: 5 ft 9 in (175 cm)
- Weight: 157 lb (71 kg; 11 st 3 lb)
- Position: Centre
- Played for: Naprzód Janów; KTH Krynica; GKS Katowice
- National team: Poland
- NHL draft: Undrafted
- Playing career: 1978–1997

Andrzej Hachuła (6 August 1960 – 5 November 2024) was a Polish ice hockey player. He played for the Poland national team at the 1984 Winter Olympics in Sarajevo. He died on 5 November 2024, at the age of 64.
