= Stanisław Klocek =

Polish ice hockey player

- Born: October 17, 1955 (age 71) Nowy Targ, Poland
- Height: 5 ft 8 in (173 cm)
- Weight: 150 lb (68 kg; 10 st 10 lb)
- Position: Centre
- Played for: Zaglebie Sosnowiec
- National team: Poland
- NHL draft: Undrafted
- Playing career: 1979–1984

Stanisław Jan Klocek (born October 17, 1955) is a former Polish ice hockey player. He played for the Poland men's national ice hockey team at the 1980 Winter Olympics in Lake Placid, and the 1984 Winter Olympics in Sarajevo.

He represented Poland twice at the Olympic Games (1980 in Lake Placid, 1984 in Sarajevo). He played in four World Championship tournaments (1981, 1982, 1983, 1985). In total, he played 103 matches for the Polish national team, scoring 39 goals.
