= Jan Stopczyk =

Polish ice hockey player

- Born: September 28, 1958 (age 68) Zgierz, Poland
- Height: 6 ft 0 in (183 cm)
- Weight: 187 lb (85 kg; 13 st 5 lb)
- Position: Right wing
- Played for: ŁKS Łódź
- National team: Poland
- NHL draft: Undrafted
- Playing career: 1977–1997

Jan Stopczyk (born September 28, 1958) is a former Polish ice hockey player. He played for the Poland men's national ice hockey team at the 1984 Winter Olympics in Sarajevo, and the 1988 Winter Olympics in Calgary.
