= Jan Piecko =

Polish ice hockey player

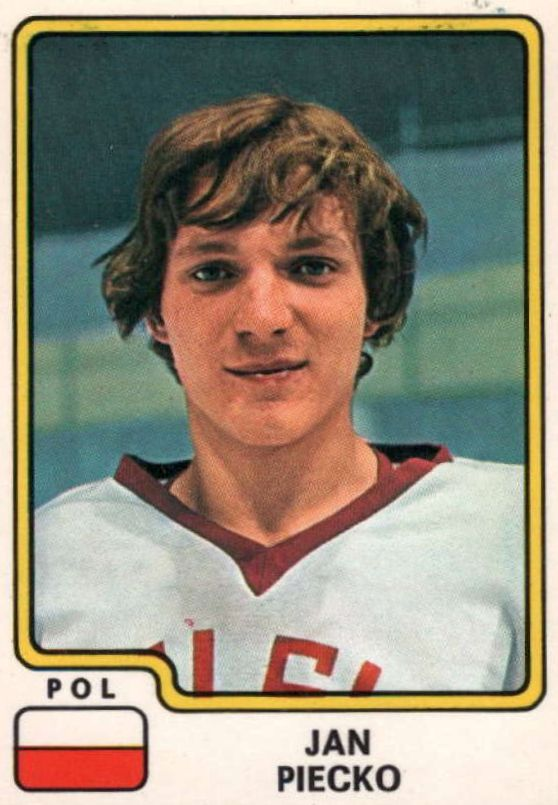
- Born: February 3, 1955 (age 70); Stalinogród, Polish People's Republic
- Height: 5 ft 11 in (180 cm)
- Weight: 159 lb (72 kg; 11 st 5 lb)
- Position: Left wing
- Played for: Polonia Bytom
- National team: Poland
- NHL draft: Undrafted
- Playing career: 1978–1998

Jan Piecko (born February 3, 1955) is a former Polish ice hockey player who played for the Poland men's national ice hockey team at the 1984 Winter Olympics in Sarajevo.
