= Adriano Tancon =

Italian ice hockey player

Personal information
- Nationality: Italian
- Born: 18 November 1958 (age 66); Canale d'Agordo, Italy

Sport
- Sport: Ice hockey

Adriano Tancon (born 18 November 1958) is an Italian ice hockey player. He competed in the men's tournament at the 1984 Winter Olympics.
