= Gerard Ciarcia =

Italian ice hockey player

Personal information
- Nationality: Italian
- Born: 23 October 1956 (age 70) Boston, Massachusetts, United States

Sport
- Sport: Ice hockey

Gerard Ciarcia (born 23 October 1956) is an Italian ice hockey player. He competed in the men's tournament at the 1984 Winter Olympics.
