= Grant Goegan =

Italian ice hockey player

Personal information
- Nationality: Italian
- Born: 15 October 1955 (age 69); Victoria, British Columbia, Canada

Sport
- Sport: Ice hockey

Grant Goegan (born 15 October 1955) is an Italian ice hockey player. He competed in the men's tournament at the 1984 Winter Olympics.
