= Andrzej Nowak (ice hockey) =

Polish ice hockey player

- Born: 7 February 1956; Czarny Dunajec, Nowy Targ, Poland
- Died: 30 May 2013 (aged 57)
- Height: 5 ft 11 in (180 cm)
- Weight: 170 lb (77 kg; 12 st 2 lb)
- Position: Defence
- Played for: Legia Warszawa
- National team: Poland
- NHL draft: Undrafted
- Playing career: 1974–1993

Andrzej Józef Nowak (7 February 1956 – 30 May 2013) was a Polish ice hockey player. He played for the Poland men's national ice hockey team at the 1984 Winter Olympics in Sarajevo.
