= Henryk Pytel =

Polish ice hockey player (1955–2024)

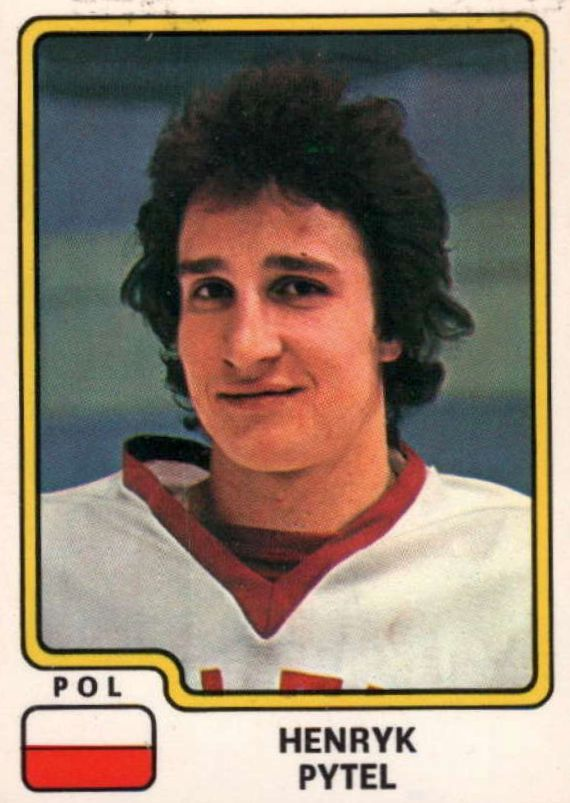
- Born: 15 September 1955; Sosnowiec, Poland
- Died: 27 January 2024 (aged 68)
- Height: 5 ft 9 in (175 cm)
- Weight: 159 lb (72 kg; 11 st 5 lb)
- Position: Left wing
- Played for: Zaglebie Sosnowiec
- National team: Poland
- NHL draft: Undrafted
- Playing career: 1975–1985

Henryk Tomasz Pytel (15 September 1955 – 27 January 2024) was a Polish ice hockey player. He played for the Poland national team at the 1976 Winter Olympics in Innsbruck, the 1980 Winter Olympics in Lake Placid, and the 1984 Winter Olympics in Sarajevo.

Pytel died on 27 January 2024, at the age of 68.
