= Erwin Kostner =

Italian ice hockey player

- Born: 7 April 1958 (age 67) Bressanone, Italy
- Played for: HC Gardena; HC Merano; HC Bolzano
- National team: Italy
- Playing career: 1975–1996

Erwin Kostner (born 7 April 1958) is an Italian ice hockey coach and former player. He competed in the men's tournament at the 1984 Winter Olympics.

As a player Kostner won four times the Scudetto: three times with HC Gardena (1975-1976, 1979-1980 and 1980-1981) and one time with HC Bolzano (1989-1990). After retirement he becomes a coach in Italy (with Ritten Sport, HC Gherdëina, SHC Fassa, the jr. team of Val Pusteria and the Under-18 and Under-20 national teams) and Switzerland (Giovani Discatori Turrita Bellinzona and HC Thurgau).

Erwin Kostner is father of figure skater Carolina Kostner and of the ice hockey player Simon Kostner. He is also the uncle of alpine skier Isolde Kostner.
