= Andrzej Chowaniec =

Polish ice hockey player

- Born: 1 January 1958 (age 67); Kojszowka, Polish People's Republic
- Height: 6 ft 1 in (185 cm)
- Weight: 187 lb (85 kg; 13 st 5 lb)
- Position: Defence
- Shot: Left
- Played for: Podhale Nowy Targ
- National team: Poland
- NHL draft: Undrafted
- Playing career: 1974–1989

Andrzej Chowaniec (born 1 January 1958) is a former Polish ice hockey player. He played for the Poland men's national ice hockey team at the 1984 Winter Olympics in Sarajevo.
