= List of Olympic ice hockey players for Czechoslovakia =

The list of Olympic men's ice hockey players for Czechoslovakia consisted of 160 skaters and 21 goaltenders. Men's ice hockey tournaments have been staged at the Olympic Games since 1920 (it was introduced at the 1920 Summer Olympics, and was permanently added to the Winter Olympic Games in 1924). Czechoslovakia participated in sixteen tournaments, the first in 1920 and the last in 1992, only missing the 1932 Winter Olympics during the country's existence. The country split after that into the Czech Republic and Slovakia, with the Czech and Slovak national teams participating in every Olympics since then. Czechoslovakia won four silver and four bronze medals.

Three players — Vlastimil Bubník, Josef Černý, and Jiří Holík — have played in four separate Olympics, while Bubník played in the most games, 30. Vladimír Zábrodský scored the most goals, 23, while Černý had the most assists, 17, and tied with Jozef Golonka for the most points, 29. Three players, Dominik Hašek, Václav Nedomanský, and Peter Šťastný, have been inducted into the Hockey Hall of Fame, while 24 players have been inducted into the International Ice Hockey Federation Hall of Fame, though Ján Starší was inducted as a builder.

== Key ==
General terms
| Term | Definition |
|---|---|
| GP | Games played |
| HHOF | Hockey Hall of Fame |
| IIHFHOF | International Ice Hockey Federation Hall of Fame |
| Olympics | Number of Olympic Games tournaments |
| Ref(s) | Reference(s) |

Goaltender statistical abbreviations
| Abbreviation | Definition |
|---|---|
| W | Wins |
| L | Losses |
| T | Ties |
| Min | Minutes played |
| SO | Shutouts |
| GA | Goals against |
| GAA | Goals against average |

Skater statistical abbreviations
| Abbreviation | Definition |
|---|---|
| G | Goals |
| A | Assists |
| P | Points |
| PIM | Penalty minutes |

== Goaltenders ==
Goaltenders
| Player | Olympics | Tournament(s) | GP | W | L | T | Min | SO | GA | GAA | Medals | Notes | Ref(s) |
|---|---|---|---|---|---|---|---|---|---|---|---|---|---|
| Josef Boháč | 1 | 1936 | 5 | 0 | 3 | 2 | – | 0 | 20 | – | | | |
| Petr Bříza | 1 | 1992 | 6 | 1 | 4 | 1 | – | 0 | 18 | – | Bronze (1992) | Czech 1994 | |
| Jiří Crha | 1 | 1976 | 4 | 2 | 0 | 0 | – | 0 | 12 | – | Silver (1976) | | |
| Vladimír Dvořáček | 1 | 1960 | 7 | 1 | 6 | 0 | – | – | – | – | | | |
| Vladimír Dzurilla | 3 | 1964, 1968, 1972 | 3 | 1 | 1 | 0 | – | 0 | 4 | – | Bronze (1964); Silver (1968); Bronze (1972) | IIHFHOF (1998) (Note: Inducted with Slovakia) | |
| Dominik Hašek | 1 | 1988 | 1 | 0 | 1 | 0 | – | 0 | 5 | – | | HHOF (2014); IIHFHOF (2015) (Note: Inducted with the Czech Republic); Czech 1998, 2002, 2006 | |
| Jiří Holeček | 2 | 1972, 1976 | 5 | 0 | 4 | 1 | – | 0 | – | – | Bronze (1972); Silver (1976) | IIHFHOF (1998) | |
| Zdeněk Jarkovský | 1 | 1948 | 5 | 1 | 4 | 0 | – | 0 | 23 | – | Silver (1948) | | |
| Ján Jendek | 1 | 1956 | 13 | 3 | 8 | 2 | – | 1 | 43 | – | | | |
| Jiří Králík | 2 | 1980, 1984 | 3 | 1 | 2 | 0 | – | 0 | 14 | – | Silver (1984) | | |
| Karel Lang | 1 | 1980 | 6 | 1 | 5 | 0 | – | – | – | – | | | |
| Bohumil Modrý | 1 | 1948 | 5 | 1 | 4 | 0 | – | 0 | 37 | – | Silver (1948) | IIHFHOF (2011) | |
| Vladimír Nadrchal | 3 | 1960, 1964, 1968 | 1 | 0 | 1 | 0 | – | 0 | 3 | – | Bronze (1964); Silver (1968) | | |
| Jan Peka | 3 | 1920, 1928, 1936 | 6 | 3 | 3 | 0 | – | 0 | 18 | – | Bronze (1920) | | |
| Jan Richter | 1 | 1952 | 8 | 1 | 5 | 2 | – | 0 | 34 | – | | | |
| Jaromír Šindel | 2 | 1984, 1988 | 2 | 0 | 2 | 0 | – | 0 | 14 | – | Silver (1984) | | |
| Jaroslav Stránský | 1 | 1924 | 3 | 0 | 3 | 0 | – | 0 | – | – | | | |
| Oldřich Svoboda | 1 | 1992 | 8 | 2 | 4 | 2 | – | – | – | – | Bronze (1992) | | |
| Jan Vodička | 1 | 1956 | 8 | 2 | 4 | 2 | – | – | – | – | | | |
| Karel Wälzer | 1 | 1920 | 8 | 2 | 4 | 2 | – | – | – | – | Bronze (1920) | | |
| Jozef Záhorský | 1 | 1952 | 8 | 2 | 4 | 2 | – | – | – | – | | | |

== Skaters ==
Skaters
| Player | Olympics | Tournaments | GP | G | A | P | PIM | Medals | Notes | Ref(s) |
|---|---|---|---|---|---|---|---|---|---|---|
| Josef Augusta | 1 | 1976 | 6 | 2 | 1 | 3 | 2 | Silver (1976) | | |
| Patrik Augusta | 1 | 1992 | 8 | 3 | 2 | 5 | 0 | Bronze (1992) | | |
| Stanislav Bacílek | 1 | 1956 | 6 | 0 | 0 | 0 | 6 | | | |
| Slavomír Bartoň | 2 | 1952, 1956 | 16 | 13 | 2 | 15 | 6 | | | |
| Vladimír Bednář | 1 | 1972 | 6 | 0 | 0 | 0 | 4 | Bronze (1972) | | |
| Jaroslav Benák | 2 | 1984, 1988 | 15 | 2 | 5 | 7 | 16 | Silver (1984) | | |
| Miloslav Blažek | 1 | 1952 | 7 | 4 | 2 | 6 | 0 | | | |
| Vladimír Bouzek | 1 | 1948 | 2 | 4 | 0 | 4 | 0 | Silver (1948) | IIHFHOF (2007) | |
| Mojmir Bozik | 1 | 1988 | 8 | 1 | 3 | 4 | 2 | | | |
| Jiří Bubla | 2 | 1976, 1980 | 12 | 1 | 6 | 7 | 8 | Silver (1976) | | |
| Augustin Bubník | 1 | 1948 | 3 | 3 | 0 | 3 | 0 | Silver (1976) | | |
| Václav Bubník | 2 | 1952, 1956 | 16 | 2 | 1 | 3 | 12 | | | |
| Vlastimil Bubník | 4 | 1952, 1956, 1960, 1964 | 30 | 17 | 10 | 27 | 22 | Bronze (1964) | IIHFHOF (1997) | |
| Jaromír Bünter | 1 | 1956 | 5 | 1 | 0 | 1 | 4 | | | |
| Vladimír Caldr | 1 | 1984 | 7 | 4 | 0 | 4 | 2 | Silver (1984) | | |
| Josef Černý | 4 | 1960, 1964, 1968, 1972 | 28 | 12 | 17 | 29 | 8 | Bronze (1964); Silver (1968); Silver (1972) | IIHFHOF (2007) | |
| Alois Cetkovský | 1 | 1936 | 5 | 0 | 0 | 0 | 0 | | | |
| Milan Chalupa | 3 | 1976, 1980, 1984 | 19 | 1 | 4 | 5 | 18 | Silver (1976); Silver (1984) | | |
| Miloslav Charouzd | 1 | 1952 | 9 | 5 | 2 | 7 | 0 | | | |
| Otto Cimrman | 1 | 1956 | 3 | 0 | 2 | 2 | 2 | | | |
| Bronislav Danda | 3 | 1952, 1956, 1960 | 18 | 5 | 3 | 8 | 4 | | | |
| Jiří Dolana | 1 | 1964 | 8 | 8 | 3 | 11 | 0 | Bronze (1964) | | |
| Jiří Doležal | 1 | 1988 | 6 | 0 | 2 | 2 | 2 | | Czech 1992 | |
| Wolfgang Dorasil | 1 | 1928 | 2 | 0 | 0 | 0 | 0 | | | |
| Jaroslav Drobný | 1 | 1948 | 7 | 11 | 5 | 16 | 2 | Silver (1948) | IIHFHOF (1997) | |
| Vítězslav Ďuriš | 1 | 1980 | 6 | 0 | 1 | 1 | 2 | | | |
| Miroslav Dvořák | 2 | 1976, 1980 | 12 | 1 | 5 | 6 | 2 | Silver (1976) | | |
| Bohuslav Ebermann | 2 | 1976, 1980 | 12 | 3 | 3 | 6 | 4 | Silver (1976) | | |
| Richard Farda | 1 | 1972 | 6 | 1 | 5 | 6 | 0 | Silver (1972) | | |
| Jan Fleischmann | 1 | 1980 | 1 | 0 | 0 | 0 | 0 | | | |
| Miloslav Fleischmann | 1 | 1924 | 3 | 0 | 0 | 0 | 0 | | | |
| Miroslav Fryčer | 1 | 1980 | 6 | 1 | 2 | 3 | 7 | | | |
| Jozef Golonka | 3 | 1960, 1964, 1968 | 22 | 17 | 12 | 29 | 22 | Bronze (1964); Silver (1968) | | |
| František Gregor | 1 | 1964 | 8 | 1 | 1 | 2 | 0 | Bronze (1964) | | |
| Leo Gudas | 1 | 1992 | 8 | 0 | 2 | 2 | 6 | Bronze (1992) | | |
| Karel Gut | 3 | 1952, 1956, 1960 | 22 | 7 | 9 | 16 | 6 | | IIHFHOF (1998) | |
| Přemysl Hajný | 1 | 1948 | 5 | 2 | 0 | 2 | 0 | Silver (1948) | | |
| Vlastimil Hajšman | 1 | 1952 | 8 | 3 | 0 | 3 | 0 | | | |
| Karel Hartmann | 1 | 1920 | 3 | 0 | 0 | 0 | 0 | Bronze (1920) | | |
| Oto Haščák | 1 | 1988 | 8 | 1 | 3 | 4 | 0 | | Slovakia 1994, 1998 | |
| Jan Havel | 1 | 1968 | 7 | 5 | 1 | 6 | 2 | Silver (1968) | | |
| Petr Hejma | 1 | 1968 | 7 | 3 | 0 | 3 | 4 | Silver (1968) | | |
| Ivan Hlinka | 2 | 1972, 1976 | 12 | 8 | 6 | 14 | 11 | Bronze (1972); Silver (1976) | IIHFHOF (2002) | |
| Jaroslav Holík | 1 | 1972 | 3 | 2 | 1 | 3 | 0 | Bronze (1972) | | |
| Jiří Holík | 4 | 1964, 1968, 1972, 1976 | 27 | 8 | 10 | 18 | 10 | Bronze (1964); Silver (1968); Bronze (1972); Silver (1976) | IIHFHOF (1999) | |
| Karel Holý | 1 | 1980 | 6 | 0 | 0 | 0 | 0 | | | |
| Miloslav Hořava | 3 | 1984, 1988, 1992 | 21 | 2 | 5 | 7 | 14 | Silver (1984); Bronze (1992) | Czech 1994 | |
| Josef Horešovský | 2 | 1968, 1972 | 13 | 5 | 2 | 7 | 4 | Silver (1968); Bronze (1972) | | |
| Jan Hrbatý | 1 | 1968 | 7 | 2 | 7 | 9 | 2 | Silver (1968) | | |
| Petr Hrbek | 1 | 1992 | 8 | 3 | 7 | 10 | 6 | Bronze (1992) | Czech 1994 | |
| Jiří Hrdina | 2 | 1984, 1988 | 15 | 6 | 10 | 16 | 14 | Silver (1984) | | |
| Karel Hromádka | 2 | 1928, 1936 | 7 | 1 | 0 | 1 | 0 | | | |
| Otakar Janecký | 1 | 1992 | 8 | 4 | 3 | 7 | 2 | Bronze (1992) | Czech 1994 | |
| Tomáš Jelínek | 1 | 1992 | 8 | 3 | 2 | 5 | 12 | Bronze (1992) | | |
| Jaroslav Jiřík | 3 | 1960, 1964, 1968 | 16 | 9 | 7 | 16 | 12 | Bronze (1964); Silver (1968) | | |
| Jaroslav Jirkovský | 1 | 1924 | 3 | 1 | 0 | 1 | 0 | | | |
| Drahomír Jirotka | 1 | 1936 | 8 | 3 | 0 | 3 | 0 | | | |
| Zdeněk Jirotka | 1 | 1936 | 4 | 3 | 0 | 3 | 0 | | | |
| František Kaberle | 1 | 1980 | 6 | 0 | 3 | 3 | 0 | | | |
| Arnold Kadlec | 2 | 1980, 1984 | 13 | 3 | 3 | 6 | 12 | Silver (1984) | | |
| Drahomír Kadlec | 1 | 1992 | 8 | 1 | 4 | 5 | 6 | Bronze (1992) | Czech 1994 | |
| Milan Kajkl | 1 | 1976 | 5 | 0 | 1 | 1 | 6 | Silver (1976) | | |
| Jan Kasper | 2 | 1956, 1960 | 14 | 3 | 4 | 7 | 14 | | | |
| Kamil Kašťák | 1 | 1992 | 8 | 2 | 5 | 7 | 0 | Bronze (1992) | Czech 1994 | |
| Jan Klapáč | 2 | 1964, 1968 | 12 | 1 | 1 | 2 | 6 | Bronze (1964); Silver (1968) | | |
| Miroslav Klůc | 1 | 1956 | 3 | 2 | 1 | 3 | 2 | | | |
| Vladimír Kobranov | 1 | 1948 | 2 | 0 | 0 | 0 | 0 | Silver (1948) | | |
| Jiří Kochta | 2 | 1968, 1972 | 10 | 5 | 3 | 8 | 0 | Silver (1968); Bronze (1972) | | |
| Stanislav Konopásek | 1 | 1948 | 6 | 12 | 1 | 13 | 0 | Silver (1948) | | |
| Jaroslav Korbela | 1 | 1984 | 7 | 0 | 1 | 1 | 10 | Silver (1984) | | |
| Jan Košek | 1 | 1936 | 3 | 0 | 0 | 0 | 0 | | | |
| Jan Krásl | 2 | 1924, 1928 | 4 | 0 | 0 | 0 | 0 | | | |
| Oldřich Kučera | 1 | 1936 | 8 | 6 | 0 | 6 | 0 | | | |
| Vladimír Kýhos | 1 | 1984 | 7 | 1 | 0 | 1 | 4 | Silver (1984) | | |
| Jiří Lála | 2 | 1984, 1988 | 15 | 3 | 5 | 8 | 2 | Silver (1984) | | |
| Robert Lang | 1 | 1992 | 8 | 5 | 8 | 13 | 8 | Bronze (1992) | Czech 1998, 2002, 2006 | |
| Igor Liba | 3 | 1984, 1988, 1992 | 19 | 9 | 10 | 19 | 18 | Silver (1984); Bronze (1992) | | |
| Erwin Lichnofsky (Johann Lichnowski) | 1 | 1928 | 1 | 0 | 0 | 0 | 0 | | | |
| Jan Lidral | 1 | 1952 | 2 | 0 | 2 | 2 | 0 | | | |
| Valentin Loos | 2 | 1920, 1924 | 6 | 4 | 0 | 4 | 4 | Bronze (1920) | | |
| Ladislav Lubina | 1 | 1992 | 8 | 2 | 4 | 6 | 2 | Bronze (1992) | | |
| Vincent Lukáč | 2 | 1980, 1984 | 13 | 6 | 10 | 16 | 2 | Silver (1984) | | |
| Oldřich Machač | 3 | 1968, 1972, 1976 | 19 | 0 | 5 | 5 | 14 | Silver (1968); Bronze (1972); Silver (1976) | IIHFHOF (1999) | |
| Josef Maleček | 3 | 1924, 1928, 1936 | 13 | 11 | 0 | 11 | 0 | | IIHFHOF (2003) | |
| Vladimír Martinec | 3 | 1972, 1976, 1980 | 16 | 12 | 8 | 20 | 2 | Bronze (1972); Silver (1976) | IIHFHOF (2001) | |
| František Mašlán | 1 | 1960 | 2 | 0 | 0 | 0 | 0 | | | |
| Karel Masopust | 1 | 1968 | 7 | 0 | 1 | 1 | 6 | Silver (1968) | | |
| Zdeněk Návrat | 1 | 1956 | 7 | 3 | 2 | 5 | 0 | | | |
| Václav Nedomanský | 2 | 1968, 1972 | 13 | 13 | 5 | 18 | 4 | Silver (1968); Bronze (1972) | HHOF (2019); IIHFHOF (1997) | |
| Jan Neliba | 1 | 1980 | 6 | 0 | 1 | 1 | 2 | | | |
| Eduard Novák | 2 | 1972, 1976 | 9 | 6 | 1 | 7 | 4 | Bronze (1972); Silver (1976) | | |
| Jiří Novák | 2 | 1976, 1980 | 12 | 6 | 4 | 10 | 4 | Silver (1976) | | |
| Milan Nový | 2 | 1976, 1980 | 11 | 14 | 10 | 24 | 0 | Silver (1976) | IIHFHOF (2012) | |
| Miroslav Nový | 1 | 1952 | 7 | 0 | 0 | 0 | 0 | | | |
| Miloslav Ošmera | 1 | 1952 | 7 | 2 | 0 | 2 | 0 | | | |
| Jan Palouš | 2 | 1920, 1924 | 6 | 0 | 0 | 0 | 0 | | | |
| Václav Pantůček | 2 | 1956, 1960 | 13 | 11 | 5 | 16 | 2 | | | |
| Dušan Pašek | 2 | 1984, 1988 | 15 | 7 | 8 | 15 | 10 | Silver (1984) | | |
| Karel Pešek | 1 | 1920 | 3 | 0 | 0 | 0 | 0 | | | |
| Miloslav Pokorný | 1 | 1948 | 11 | 1 | 2 | 3 | 6 | Silver (1948) | | |
| František Pospíšil | 3 | 1968, 1972, 1976 | 19 | 4 | 8 | 12 | 22 | Silver (1968); Bronze (1972); Silver (1976) | IIHFHOF (1999) | |
| Rudolf Potsch | 2 | 1960, 1964 | 15 | 5 | 4 | 9 | 8 | Bronze (1964) | | |
| Jaroslav Pouzar | 2 | 1976, 1980 | 12 | 10 | 7 | 17 | 12 | Silver (1976) | | |
| František Procházka | 1 | 1992 | 8 | 1 | 1 | 2 | 4 | Bronze (1992) | | |
| Bohumil Prošek | 1 | 1956 | 7 | 2 | 2 | 4 | 0 | | | |
| Stanislav Prýl | 1 | 1964 | 5 | 1 | 1 | 2 | 4 | Bronze (1964) | | |
| Jaroslav Pušbauer | 2 | 1928, 1936 | 10 | 0 | 0 | 0 | 2 | | | |
| Zdeněk Pýcha | 1 | 1952 | 2 | 0 | 0 | 0 | 0 | | | |
| Radim Raděvič | 1 | 1988 | 8 | 0 | 1 | 1 | 0 | | | |
| Miroslav Rejman | 1 | 1952 | 9 | 4 | 3 | 7 | 0 | | | |
| Pavel Richter | 1 | 1984 | 7 | 2 | 5 | 7 | 4 | Silver (1984) | | |
| Petr Rosol | 2 | 1988, 1992 | 15 | 7 | 5 | 12 | 16 | Bronze (1992) | | |
| Václav Roziňák | 1 | 1948 | 7 | 8 | 1 | 9 | 2 | Silver (1948) | | |
| Dárius Rusnák | 1 | 1984 | 7 | 4 | 5 | 9 | 6 | Silver (1984) | | |
| Vladimír Růžička | 2 | 1984, 1988 | 15 | 8 | 9 | 17 | 12 | Silver (1984) | Czech 1998 | |
| Bedřich Ščerban | 2 | 1988, 1992 | 16 | 0 | 4 | 4 | 2 | Bronze (1992) | Czech 1994 | |
| Oldřich Sedlák | 1 | 1952 | 6 | 0 | 1 | 1 | 0 | | | |
| Jiří Šejba | 1 | 1988 | 8 | 3 | 1 | 4 | 16 | | | |
| Jiří Sekyra | 1 | 1952 | 9 | 8 | 1 | 9 | 0 | | | |
| František Ševčík | 1 | 1968 | 7 | 3 | 2 | 5 | 4 | Silver (1968) | | |
| Miroslav Sláma | 1 | 1948 | 4 | 3 | 0 | 3 | 2 | Silver (1948) | | |
| Jiří Šlégr | 1 | 1992 | 8 | 1 | 2 | 3 | 14 | Bronze (1992) | Czech 1998 | |
| Richard Šmehlík | 1 | 1992 | 8 | 0 | 1 | 1 | 2 | Bronze (1992) | Czech 1998, 2002 | |
| Ladislav Šmíd | 1 | 1964 | 6 | 1 | 0 | 1 | 4 | Bronze (1964) | | |
| Josef Šroubek | 3 | 1920, 1924, 1928 | 8 | 4 | 0 | 4 | 0 | Bronze (1920) | | |
| Ján Starší | 1 | 1960 | 7 | 4 | 5 | 9 | 6 | | IIHFHOF (1999) (Note: Inducted as a builder) | |
| Anton Šťastný | 1 | 1980 | 6 | 4 | 4 | 8 | 2 | | | |
| Bohuslav Šťastný | 2 | 1972, 1976 | 12 | 3 | 5 | 8 | 2 | Bronze (1972); Silver (1976) | | |
| Marián Šťastný | 1 | 1980 | 6 | 5 | 6 | 11 | 4 | | | |
| Peter Šťastný | 1 | 1980 | 6 | 7 | 7 | 14 | 6 | | HHOF (2000); IIHFHOF (2015); Slovakia 1994 | |
| Antonín Stavjaňa | 1 | 1988 | 8 | 4 | 5 | 9 | 4 | | Czech 1994 | |
| Bohumil Steigenhöfer | 1 | 1928 | 2 | 0 | 0 | 0 | 0 | | | |
| Karel Stibor | 1 | 1948 | 7 | 8 | 1 | 9 | 0 | Silver (1948) | | |
| Vilibald Šťovík | 1 | 1948 | 7 | 0 | 0 | 0 | 0 | Silver (1948) | | |
| Rudolf Suchánek | 1 | 1988 | 8 | 1 | 0 | 1 | 4 | | | |
| Jan Suchý | 1 | 1968 | 7 | 2 | 4 | 6 | 8 | Silver (1968) | IIHFHOF (2009) | |
| Róbert Švehla | 1 | 1992 | 8 | 2 | 1 | 3 | 8 | Bronze (1992) | Slovakia 1994, 1998 | |
| Stanislav Sventek | 1 | 1964 | 8 | 1 | 0 | 1 | 0 | Bronze (1964) | | |
| Radoslav Svoboda | 1 | 1984 | 7 | 3 | 2 | 5 | 4 | Silver (1984) | | |
| Rudolf Tajcnár | 1 | 1972 | 6 | 0 | 1 | 1 | 6 | Silver (1972) | | |
| František Tikal | 2 | 1960, 1964 | 13 | 3 | 5 | 8 | 6 | Bronze (1964) | IIHFHOF (2004) | |
| Radek Ťoupal | 1 | 1992 | 8 | 1 | 0 | 1 | 6 | Bronze (1992) | Czech 1994 | |
| Jiří Tožička | 2 | 1928, 1936 | 8 | 1 | 0 | 1 | 0 | | | |
| Ladislav Troják | 2 | 1936, 1948 | 16 | 6 | 0 | 6 | 0 | Silver (1948) | IIHFHOF (2011) | |
| Josef Trousílek | 1 | 1948 | 4 | 1 | 0 | 1 | 0 | Silver (1948) | | |
| Walter Ullrich | 1 | 1936 | 1 | 0 | 0 | 0 | 0 | | | |
| Eduard Uvíra | 2 | 1984, 1988 | 15 | 1 | 1 | 2 | 4 | Silver (1984) | | |
| František Vaněk | 2 | 1956, 1960 | 12 | 6 | 4 | 10 | 2 | | | |
| Peter Veselovský | 1 | 1992 | 8 | 1 | 0 | 1 | 2 | Bronze (1992) | | |
| Otakar Vindyš | 2 | 1920, 1924 | 6 | 0 | 0 | 0 | 0 | Bronze (1920) | | |
| Miroslav Vlach | 2 | 1960, 1964 | 15 | 17 | 5 | 22 | 12 | Bronze (1964) | | |
| Rostislav Vlach | 1 | 1988 | 8 | 0 | 3 | 3 | 4 | | | |
| Petr Vlk | 1 | 1988 | 8 | 1 | 3 | 4 | 12 | | | |
| Karel Vohralík | 1 | 1972 | 6 | 0 | 1 | 1 | 6 | Bronze (1972) | | |
| David Volek | 1 | 1988 | 8 | 1 | 2 | 3 | 2 | | | |
| Jaroslav Volf | 1 | 1960 | 6 | 1 | 3 | 4 | 0 | | | |
| Jaroslav Walter | 1 | 1964 | 8 | 4 | 4 | 8 | 0 | Bronze (1964) | | |
| Oldřich Zábrodský | 1 | 1948 | 6 | 0 | 3 | 3 | 2 | Silver (1948) | | |
| Vladimír Zábrodský | 2 | 1948, 1956 | 15 | 23 | 3 | 26 | 0 | Silver (1948) | IIHFHOF (1997) | |
| Richard Žemlička | 1 | 1992 | 8 | 1 | 4 | 5 | 6 | Bronze (1992) | Czech 1994 | |
