= Ice hockey at the 1952 Winter Olympics – Rosters =

The ice hockey team rosters at the 1952 Winter Olympics consisted of the following players:

== Canada ==
Head coach: Louis Holmes

No.	Pos.	Name	Birthdate	Team
-	G	Ralph Hansch	May 20, 1924 (aged 27)	(Canada) Edmonton Mercurys
1	G	Eric Paterson	September 11, 1929 (aged 22)	(Canada) Edmonton Mercurys
2	D	John Davies	July 14, 1928 (aged 23)	(Canada) Edmonton Mercurys
3	D	Robert "Bob" Meyers	August 11, 1924 (aged 26)	(Canada) Edmonton Mercurys
4	D	Allan Purvis	January 9, 1929 (aged 23)	(Canada) Edmonton Mercurys
5	F	Billie Dawe (C)	June 18, 1924 (aged 27)	(Canada) Edmonton Mercurys
6	D	Donald Gauf	January 1, 1927 (aged 25)	(Canada) Edmonton Mercurys
7	F	Robert "Bob" Watt	June 7, 1917 (aged 34)	(Canada) Edmonton Mercurys
8	F	George Abel	February 25, 1916 (aged 35)	(Canada) Edmonton Mercurys
9	F	Robert "Bruce" Dickson	April 22, 1931 (aged 20)	(Canada) Edmonton Mercurys
10	F	David Miller	December 15, 1925 (aged 26)	(Canada) Edmonton Mercurys
11	F	Francis Sullivan	June 7, 1917 (aged 34)	(Canada) Edmonton Mercurys
12	F	Louis Secco	January 18, 1927 (aged 25)	(Canada) Edmonton Mercurys
13	F	William Gibson	April 22, 1927 (aged 24)	(Canada) Edmonton Mercurys
14	F	Gordon Robertson	June 25, 1926 (aged 25)	(Canada) Edmonton Mercurys
15	D	Thomas Pollock	August 1, 1925 (aged 26)	(Canada) Edmonton Mercurys

== Czechoslovakia ==
Head coach: Jiří Tožička

Assistant coach: Josef Herman

No.	Pos.	Name	Birthdate	Team
-	G	Jan Richter	March 29, 1923 (aged 28)	(Czechoslovakia) ZJS GZ Kralovo pole
-	G	Jozef Záhorský	January 6, 1929 (aged 23)	(Czechoslovakia) ATK Praha
1	D	Jan Lidral	March 19, 1929 (aged 22)	(Czechoslovakia) ATK Praha
2	D	Karel Gut (C)	September 16, 1927 (aged 24)	(Czechoslovakia) LTC Praha
3	D	Václav Bubník	January 1, 1926 (aged 26)	(Czechoslovakia) Sokol VŽKG
4	D	Miloslav Ošmera	January 21, 1924 (aged 28)	(Czechoslovakia) ATK Praha
5	F	Slavomír Bartoň	January 12, 1926 (aged 26)	(Czechoslovakia) ATK Praha
6	F	Bronislav Danda	January 10, 1930 (aged 22)	(Czechoslovakia) SK Zbrojovka Zidenice
7	F	Miloslav Blažek	June 22, 1922 (aged 29)	(Czechoslovakia) Sokol VŽKG
8	D	Miroslav Nový	October 1, 1930 (aged 21)	(Czechoslovakia) ATK Praha
9	F	Miloslav Charouzd	August 15, 1928 (aged 23)	(Czechoslovakia) SK Smichov
10	F	Zdeněk Pýcha	May 29, 1926 (aged 25)	(Czechoslovakia) ATK Praha
11	F	Miroslav Rejman	October 27, 1925 (aged 26)	(Czechoslovakia) ATK Praha
12	F	Vlastimil Bubnik	March 18, 1931 (aged 20)	(Czechoslovakia) ZJS GZ Kralovo pole
13	F	Jiří Sekyra	April 21, 1929 (aged 22)	(Czechoslovakia) ATK Praha
14	F	Vlastimil Hajšman	February 26, 1926 (aged 25)	(Czechoslovakia) ZSJ SKP JNV České Budějovice
15	F	Oldřich Sedlák	September 3, 1922 (aged 29)	(Czechoslovakia) SK Zbrojovka Zidenice

== Finland ==
Head coach: Risto Lindroos

Assistant coach: (Canada) Joe Wirkkunen

No.	Pos.	Name	Birthdate	Team
1	G	Pekka Myllylä	July 7, 1932 (aged 19)	(Finland) Ilves
2	G	Unto Wiitala	July 5, 1925 (aged 26)	(Finland) Karhu-Kissat
3	D/F	Eero Salisma	December 16, 1916 (aged 35)	(Finland) HPK
4	D	Ossi Kauppi	April 19, 1929 (aged 22)	(Finland) Ilves
5	D	Jukka Wuolio	March 5, 1927 (aged 24)	(Finland) Ilves
6	D/F	Matti Rintakoski	September 18, 1924 (aged 27)	(Finland) TBK
7	F	Kauko Mäkinen	July 20, 1927 (aged 24)	(Finland) Ilves
8	D	Pentti Isotalo	February 17, 1927 (aged 24)	(Finland) Ilves
9	F	Lauri Silván	March 13, 1932 (aged 19)	(Finland) TBK
10	F	Yrjö Hakala	April 20, 1932 (aged 19)	(Finland) Ilves
11	F	Eero Saari	September 18, 1928 (aged 23)	(Finland) Ilves
12	F	Matti Karumaa	November 25, 1924 (aged 27)	(Finland) Tarmo
13	F	Aarne Honkavaara (C)	June 7, 1924 (aged 27)	(Finland) Ilves
13	F	Christian Rapp	May 22, 1928 (aged 23)	(Finland) HIFK
15	F	Keijo Kuusela	January 6, 1921 (aged 31)	(Finland) Tarmo
16	F	Erkki Hytönen	May 27, 1933 (aged 18)	(Finland) TBK
17	F	Esko Rekomaa	December 24, 1932 (aged 19)	(Finland) HJK

== Germany ==
Head coach: (Canada) Joe Aitken

No.	Pos.	Name	Birthdate	Team
-	G	Alfred Hoffmann	December 20, 1914 (aged 37)	(Germany) SC Riessersee
-	G	Heinz Wackers	September 20, 1925 (aged 26)	(Germany) KTSV Preussen Krefeld
1	F/D	Karl Wild	November 23, 1917 (aged 34)	(Germany) SC Riessersee
2	F/D	Herbert Schibukat (C)	October 24, 1914 (aged 37)	(Germany) KTSV Preussen Krefeld
3	F	Ludwig Kuhn	May 26, 1918 (aged 33)	(Germany) EV Füssen
4	D	Karl Bierschel	March 1, 1932 (aged 19)	(Germany) Krefelder EV 1936
5	F	Georg Guggemos	1927 (aged 25 or 25)	(Germany) EV Füssen
6	F	Fritz Poitsch	October 15, 1926 (aged 25)	(Germany) SC Riessersee
7	F	Markus Egen	September 14, 1927 (aged 24)	(Germany) EV Füssen
8	F	Xaver Unsinn	November 29, 1929 (aged 22)	(Germany) EV Füssen
9	F	Engelbert Holderied	June 26, 1924 (aged 27)	(Germany) EV Füssen
10	F	Walter Kremershof	December 23, 1922 (aged 29)	(Germany) KTSV Preussen Krefeld
11	F	Karl Enzler	March 29, 1925 (aged 26)	(Germany) SC Riessersee
12	F	Dieter Niess	March 19, 1926 (aged 25)	(Germany) VfL Bad Nauheim
13	F	Hans-Georg Pescher	April 25, 1931 (aged 20)	(Germany) Krefelder EV 1936

== Norway ==
Head coach: (Canada) Bud McEachern

No.	Pos.	Name	Birthdate	Team
1	G	Per Dahl	March 21, 1916 (aged 35)	N/A
2	D/F	Johnny Larntvet	October 27, 1916 (aged 35)	(Norway) Gamlebyen
3	D	Roar Pedersen (C)	November 24, 1927 (aged 24)	(Norway) Gamlebyen
4	D	Arne Berg	September 15, 1931 (aged 20)	(Norway) Stabæk IF
5	D	Gunnar Kroge	October 18, 1930 (aged 21)	N/A
6	F	Leif Solheim	July 14, 1932 (aged 19)	N/A
7	F/D	Øivind Solheim	May 28, 1928 (aged 23)	N/A
8	F/D	Egil Bjerklund	September 5, 1933 (aged 18)	(Norway) Hasle AIL
9	D	Per Voigt	February 12, 1931 (aged 21)	N/A
10	F	Ragnar Rygel	May 25, 1930 (aged 21)	N/A
11	F	Bjørn Oscar Gulbrandsen	September 17, 1925 (aged 26)	N/A
12	F	Finn Gundersen	April 16, 1933 (aged 18)	(Norway) Tigrene
13	F	Annar Petersen	November 23, 1931 (aged 20)	(Norway) Gamlebyen
14	D	Bjørn Gulbrandsen	January 9, 1927 (aged 25)	N/A
15	F	Jan Erik Adolfsen	June 1, 1930 (aged 21)	(Norway) Hasle AIL
16	F	Roy Strandem	April 5, 1932 (aged 19)	N/A
17	G	Arthur Kristiansen	July 18, 1923 (aged 28)	N/A

== Poland ==
Head coach: Mieczysław Kasprzycki

No.	Pos.	Name	Birthdate	Team
-	G	Stanisław Szlendak	May 21, 1920 (aged 31)	(Poland) Unia Krynica
1	F/D	Stefan Csorich (C)	September 25, 1921 (aged 30)	(Poland) Unia Krynica
2	D	Kazimierz Chodakowski	June 20, 1929 (aged 22)	(Poland) CWKS Warszawa
3	F	Eugeniusz Lewacki	January 24, 1926 (aged 26)	(Poland) Unia Krynica
4	F	Alfred Wróbel	November 29, 1927 (aged 24)	N/A
6	F	Marian Jeżak	September 26, 1928 (aged 23)	(Poland) Unia Krynica
7	F/D	Alfred Gansiniec	October 29, 1919 (aged 32)	(Poland) Gornik Janów
8	F	Antoni Wróbel	February 11, 1923 (aged 29)	(Poland) Gornik Janów
9	F	Tadeusz Świcarz	June 25, 1920 (aged 31)	(Poland) CWKS Warszawa
10	F	Hilary Skarżyński	June 18, 1925 (aged 26)	(Poland) GKS Katowice
11	D	Henryk Bromowicz	February 22, 1924 (aged 27)	(Poland) CWKS Warszawa
12	F	Roman Penczek	December 10, 1929 (aged 22)	(Poland) Gornik Janów
13	F	Zdzisław Trojanowski	May 28, 1928 (aged 23)	(Poland) CWKS Warszawa
14	D	Michał Antuszewicz	October 1, 1909 (aged 42)	(Poland) CWKS Warszawa
15	F	Rudolf Czech	September 15, 1930 (aged 21)	(Poland) Budowlani Opole
16	G	Jan Hampel	April 25, 1933 (aged 18)	(Poland) Start Katowice

== Sweden ==
No.	Pos.	Name	Birthdate	Team
-	D	Åke Lassas	August 21, 1924 (aged 27)	(Sweden) Leksands IF
1	G	Thord Floqvist	August 5, 1926 (aged 25)	(Sweden) AIK
2	D/F	Åke Andersson (C)	June 8, 1918 (aged 33)	(Sweden) Hammarby IF
3	D	Rune Johansson	August 23, 1920 (aged 31)	(Sweden) Hammarby IF
4	D	Sven Thunman	April 20, 1920 (aged 31)	(Sweden) Södertälje SK
5	D	Göte Almqvist	June 25, 1921 (aged 30)	(Sweden) Skellefteå AIK
6	F	Göte Blomqvist	January 11, 1928 (aged 24)	(Sweden) Södertälje SK
7	F	Gösta Johansson	March 2, 1929 (aged 22)	(Sweden) Djurgårdens IF
8	F	Erik Johansson	September 29, 1929 (aged 22)	(Sweden) Södertälje SK
9	F	Stig Andersson-Tvilling	July 15, 1928 (aged 23)	(Sweden) Djurgårdens IF
10	F	Hans Andersson-Tvilling	July 15, 1928 (aged 23)	(Sweden) Djurgårdens IF
11	F	Lars Pettersson	March 19, 1925 (aged 26)	(Sweden) AIK
12	F	Hans Öberg	November 21, 1926 (aged 25)	(Sweden) Gävle GIK
13	F	Sven Tumba	August 27, 1931 (aged 20)	(Sweden) Djurgårdens IF
14	F	Holger Nurmela	October 28, 1920 (aged 31)	(Sweden) AIK
15	G	Lars Svensson	June 30, 1926 (aged 25)	(Sweden) Matteuspojkarna
16	D	Lasse Björn	December 16, 1931 (aged 20)	(Sweden) Djurgårdens IF

== Switzerland ==
Head coach: Bibi Torriani

No.	Pos.	Name	Birthdate	Team
1	G	Hans Bänninger	March 17, 1924 (aged 27)	(Switzerland) Zürcher SC
2	F	Ulrich Poltera (C)	July 17, 1922 (aged 29)	(Switzerland) EHC Arosa
3	D	Emil Handschin	March 19, 1928 (aged 23)	(Switzerland) EHC Basel
4	D	Paul Hofer	November 19, 1928 (aged 23)	(Switzerland) EHC Basel
5	D	Émile Golaz	September 21, 1927 (aged 24)	(Switzerland) EHC Basel
6	F	Gian Bazzi	April 3, 1931 (aged 20)	(Switzerland) Lausanne HC
7	F	Gebhard Poltera	December 14, 1923 (aged 28)	(Switzerland) EHC Arosa
8	F	Francis Blank	December 30, 1930 (aged 21)	(Switzerland) HC Neuchâtel Young Sprinters
9	F	Willy Pfister	March 1, 1928 (aged 23)	(Switzerland) EHC Basel
10	F	Otto Schubiger	January 6, 1925 (aged 27)	(Switzerland) Grasshopper Club Zürich
11	D	Reto Delnon	May 1, 1924 (aged 27)	(Switzerland) HC La Chaux-de-Fonds
12	F/D	Walter Paul Dürst	February 28, 1927 (aged 24)	(Switzerland) HC Davos
13	F	Otto Schläpfer	March 11, 1931 (aged 20)	(Switzerland) Lausanne HC
14	F	Hans-Martin Trepp	November 9, 1922 (aged 29)	(Switzerland) EHC Arosa
15	F	Alfred Streun	June 17, 1925 (aged 26)	N/A
16	F	Bixio Celio	June 6, 1928 (aged 23)	(Switzerland) HC Ambrì-Piotta
17	G	Paul Wyss	July 28, 1928 (aged 23)	(Switzerland) SC Bern

== United States ==
Head coach: Connie Pleban

No.	Pos.	Name	Birthdate	Team
-	G	Don Whiston	June 19, 1927 (aged 24)	N/A
1	G	Dick Desmond	March 2, 1927 (aged 24)	N/A
2	D	Allen Van	March 30, 1915 (aged 36)	(United States) St. Paul Saints
3	F/D	Red Czarnota	March 25, 1925 (aged 26)	N/A
4	D/F	Bob Rompre	April 11, 1929 (aged 22)	N/A
5	F	Gerald Kilmartin	July 7, 1926 (aged 25)	N/A
6	F	Ken Yackel	March 5, 1930 (aged 21)	(United States) Minnesota Golden Gophers
7	F	Len Ceglarski	June 27, 1926 (aged 25)	N/A
8	F	Ruben Bjorkman	February 27, 1929 (aged 22)	(United States) St. Paul Saints
9	D	John Noah	November 21, 1927 (aged 24)	N/A
11	F	Andy Gambucci	November 12, 1928 (aged 23)	(United States) Colorado College Tigers
12	D	Jim Sedin	June 25, 1930 (aged 21)	(United States) St. Paul Saints
14	F	Clifford Harrison	October 30, 1927 (aged 24)	N/A
15	D/F	Arnold Oss	April 18, 1928 (aged 23)	(United States) Minneapolis Millers
16	F	Jack Mulhern	July 18, 1927 (aged 24)	N/A

== Sources ==
- Duplacey, James (1998). Total Hockey: The official encyclopedia of the National Hockey League. Total Sports. ISBN 0-8362-7114-9.
- Podnieks, Andrew (2010). IIHF Media Guide & Record Book 2011. Moydart Pres.
- Hockey Hall Of Fame page on the 1952 Olympics
- Wallechinsky, David (1988). The Complete Book of the Olympics. Penguin Books. pp. 614. ISBN 0-14-010771-1.
