= Czechoslovakia at the 1952 Winter Olympics =

- IOC code: TCH
- NOC: Czechoslovak Olympic Committee

in Oslo
- Competitors: 22 (men) in 3 sports
- Flag bearer: Václav Bubník (ice hockey)
- Medals: Gold 0 Silver 0 Bronze 0 Total 0

Winter Olympics appearances (overview)
- 1924; 1928; 1932; 1936; 1948; 1952; 1956; 1960; 1964; 1968; 1972; 1976; 1980; 1984; 1988; 1992

Other related appearances
- Czech Republic (1994–pres.); Slovakia (1994–pres.)

Czechoslovakia competed at the 1952 Winter Olympics in Oslo, Norway.

== Cross-country skiing ==
Men

Event	Athlete	Race	
Event	Athlete	Time	Rank
18 km	Štefan Kovalčík	DNF	–
18 km	Vladimír Šimůnek	1'12:34	47
18 km	Vlastimil Melich	1'10:09	29
50 km	František Balvín	4'21:19	21
50 km	Jaroslav Cardal	4'01:49	14

Men's 4 × 10 km relay

Athletes	Race	
Athletes	Time	Rank
Vladimír Šimůnek; Štefan Kovalčík; Vlastimil Melich; Jaroslav Cardal	2'37:12	8

== Ice hockey ==
The tournament was run in a round-robin format with nine teams participating.

Team	Pld	W	L	T	GF	GA	Pts
Canada	8	7	0	1	71	14	15
United States	8	6	1	1	43	21	13
Sweden	9	7	2	0	53	22	14
Czechoslovakia 4th	9	6	3	0	50	23	12
Switzerland	8	4	4	0	40	40	8
Poland	8	2	5	1	21	56	5
Finland	8	2	6	0	21	60	4
West Germany	8	1	6	1	21	53	3
Norway	8	0	8	0	15	46	0

- Czechoslovakia 8-2 Poland
- Norway 0-6 Czechoslovakia
- Czechoslovakia 6-1 Germany FR
- Canada 4-1 Czechoslovakia
- Czechoslovakia 11-2 Finland
- Czechoslovakia 8-3 Switzerland
- USA 6-3 Czechoslovakia
- Czechoslovakia 4-0 Sweden
- Sweden 5-3 Czechoslovakia ^{1}

^{1} Sweden and Czechoslovakia were tied with identical record and goal differentials, so a tie breaker game was played.

Contestants

- Slavomír Bartoň
- Miloslav Blažek
- Václav Bubník
- Vlastimil Bubník
- Miloslav Charouzd
- Bronislav Danda
- Karel Gut
- Vlastimil Hajšman
- Jan Lidral
- Miroslav Nový
- Miloslav Ošmera
- Zdeněk Pýcha
- Miroslav Rejman
- Jan Richter
- Oldřich Sedlák
- Jiří Sekyra
- Jozef Záhorský

== Nordic combined ==
Events:

- 18 km cross-country skiing
- normal hill ski jumping

The cross-country skiing part of this event was combined with the main medal event, meaning that athletes competing here were skiing for two disciplines at the same time. Details can be found above in this article, in the cross-country skiing section.

The ski jumping (normal hill) event was held separate from the main medal event of ski jumping, results can be found in the table below (athletes were allowed to perform three jumps, the best two jumps were counted and are shown here).

Athlete	Event	Cross-country		Ski Jumping				Total	
Athlete	Event	Points	Rank	Distance 1	Distance 2	Points	Rank	Points	Rank
Vlastimil Melich	Individual	211.818	10	56.0	58.0	179.0	22	390.818	16
