= Czechoslovakia at the 1956 Winter Olympics =

- IOC code: TCH (CSL used at these Games)
- NOC: Czechoslovak Olympic Committee

in Cortina d'Ampezzo
- Competitors: 41 (35 men, 6 women) in 7 sports
- Flag bearer: Václav Bubník (ice hockey)
- Medals: Gold 0 Silver 0 Bronze 0 Total 0

Winter Olympics appearances (overview)
- 1924; 1928; 1932; 1936; 1948; 1952; 1956; 1960; 1964; 1968; 1972; 1976; 1980; 1984; 1988; 1992

Other related appearances
- Czech Republic (1994–pres.); Slovakia (1994–pres.)

Czechoslovakia competed at the 1956 Winter Olympics in Cortina d'Ampezzo, Italy.

== Alpine skiing ==
Men

Athlete	Event	Race 1		Race 2		Total	
Athlete	Event	Time	Rank	Time	Rank	Time	Rank
Jaroslav Bogdálek	Downhill					DSQ	–
Vladimír Krajňák	Downhill					DSQ	–
Evžen Čermák	Downhill					3:18.0	17
Kurt Hennrich	Downhill					3:01.5	7
Vladimír Krajňák	Giant Slalom					3:31.0	38
Kurt Hennrich	Giant Slalom					3:30.4	36
Evžen Čermák	Giant Slalom					3:27.7	32
Jaroslav Bogdálek	Giant Slalom					3:27.3	31
Vladimír Krajňák	Slalom	n/a	?	DSQ	–	DSQ	–
Jaroslav Bogdálek	Slalom	2:00.4	44	2:06.9	22	4:07.3	29
Kurt Hennrich	Slalom	1:58.3 (+0:05)	42	2:20.2	31	4:18.5	36
Evžen Čermák	Slalom	1:37.5	28	2:05.3	19	3:42.8	21

== Cross-country skiing ==
Men

Event	Athlete	Race	
Event	Athlete	Time	Rank
15 km	Jaroslav Cardal	56:12	42
15 km	Josef Prokeš	55:05	36
15 km	Ilja Matouš	52:04	13
30 km	Jaroslav Cardal	1'51:05	18
30 km	Josef Prokeš	1'50:49	16
30 km	Ilja Matouš	1'48:12	10

Men's 4 × 10 km relay

Athletes	Race	
Athletes	Time	Rank
Emil Okuliár; Vlastimil Melich; Josef Prokeš; Ilja Matouš	2'24:54	8

Women

Event	Athlete	Race	
Event	Athlete	Time	Rank
10 km	Eva Paulusová-Benešová	43:42	28
10 km	Olga Krasilová	43:10	25
10 km	Libuše Patočková	41:52	19
10 km	Eva Lauermanová	41:04	14

Women's 3 x 5 km relay

Athletes	Race	
Athletes	Time	Rank
Eva Paulusová-Benešová; Libuše Patočková; Eva Lauermanová	1'14:19	6

== Figure skating ==
Men

Athlete	CF	FS	Points	Places	Rank
Karol Divín	5	5	154.25	49.5	5

Women

Athlete	CF	FS	Points	Places	Rank
Jindriska Kramperova	21	17	136.67	209	20

Pairs

Athletes	Points	Places	Rank
Věra Suchánková; Zdeněk Doležal	10.53	68.5	8

== Ice hockey ==
=== Group B ===
Top two teams advanced to Medal Round.

Rank	Team	Pld	W	L	T	GF	GA	Pts
1	Czechoslovakia	2	2	0	0	12	6	4
2	United States	2	1	1	0	7	4	2
3	Poland	2	0	2	0	3	12	0

- Czechoslovakia 4-3 USA
- Czechoslovakia 8-3 Poland

=== Games for 1st-6th places ===
Rank	Team	Pld	W	L	T	GF	GA	Pts
1	Soviet Union	5	5	0	0	25	5	10
2	United States	5	4	1	0	26	12	8
3	Canada	5	3	2	0	23	11	6
4	Sweden	5	1	3	1	10	17	3
5	Czechoslovakia	5	1	4	0	20	30	2
6	Germany	5	0	4	1	6	35	1

- Canada 6-3 Czechoslovakia
- Sweden 5-0 Czechoslovakia
- USSR 7-4 Czechoslovakia
- Czechoslovakia 9-3 Germany (UTG)
- USA 9-4 Czechoslovakia

=== Leading scorers ===
Rk	Team	GP	G	A	Pts
8th	(Czechoslovakia) Vlastimil Bubník	7	5	4	9

Contestants; Jan Vodička; Ján Jendek; Karel Gut; Jan Kasper; Václav Bubník; Jaromír Bünter; Slavomír Bartoň; Vlastimil Bubník; Bronislav Danda; Zdeněk Návrat; František Vaněk; Bohumil Prošek; Miroslav Klůc; Stanislav Bacílek; Vladimír Zábrodský; Otto Cimrman; Václav Pantůček

== Nordic combined ==
Events:

- normal hill ski jumping (Three jumps, best two counted and shown here.)
- 15 km cross-country skiing

Athlete	Event	Ski Jumping				Cross-country			Total	
Athlete	Event	Distance 1	Distance 2	Points	Rank	Time	Points	Rank	Points	Rank
Vlastimil Melich	Individual	62.0	65.0	183.5	28	57:18	236.100	4	419.600	18
Josef Nüsser	Individual	68.0	65.5	189.5	25	59:28	227.800	13	417.300	22
Vítězslav Lahr	Individual	68.0	67.0	193.0	22	57:39	234.800	5	427.800	12

== Ski jumping ==
Athlete	Event	Jump 1			Jump 2			Total	
Athlete	Event	Distance	Points	Rank	Distance	Points	Rank	Points	Rank
Jáchym Bulín	Normal hill	71.5	93.5	34	70.5	92.5	30	186.0	29
Mojmír Stuchlík	Normal hill	74.0	98.5	24	74.0	89.0	38	187.5	28

== Speed skating ==
Men

Event	Athlete	Race	
Event	Athlete	Time	Rank
500 m	Jaroslav Doubek	43.6	30
500 m	Vladimír Kolář	43.5	28
500 m	Bohumil Jauris	42.8	17
1500 m	Jaroslav Doubek	2:19.2	39
1500 m	Vladimír Kolář	2:16.5	27
1500 m	Bohumil Jauris	2:13.6	15
5000 m	Vladimír Kolář	8:08.9	13
10,000 m	Bohumil Jauris	17:38.4	26
10,000 m	Vladimír Kolář	17:16.9	14
