= Doubek =

Doubek (Czech: little oak) may refer to:

- Doubek (Prague-East District), village in the Central Bohemian Region of the Czech Republic
- Doubek (nature reserve), nature reserve in the Přerov District of the Czech Republic

Doubek is also a surname and may refer to:

- Jaroslav Doubek (1931-2017), Czech speed skater, participant of the 1956 Winter Olympics
