= Delnon =

Delnon is a surname. Notable people with the surname include:

- Georges Delnon (born 1958), Swiss theatre director, artistic director, and professor
- Reto Delnon (1924–1983), Swiss ice hockey player and coach

== See also ==
- Delmon (disambiguation)
