= Stejskal =

Stejskal (feminine: Stejskalová) is a Czech surname. The name may refer to:

- Adam Stejskal (born 2002), Czech footballer
- František Stejskal (1895–1975), Czech athlete
- Jan Stejskal (born 1962), Czech football player
- Jiří Stejskal (born 1982), Czech ice hockey player
- Josef Stejskal (dramatist) (1897–1942), Czech theatre director
- Martin Stejskal (born 1944), Czech painter
- Michaela Stejskalová (born 1987), Czech basketball player
