= Cetkovský =

Cetkovský (feminine: Cetkovská) is a Czech surname. Notable people with the surname include:

- Alois Cetkovský (1908–1987), Czech ice hockey player
- Jiří Cetkovský (born 1983), Czech ice hockey player
- Petra Cetkovská (born 1985), Czech tennis player
