= Augustyn Skórski =

Polish ice hockey player

- Born: 6 November 1936 Kańczuga, Poland
- Died: 22 January 1981 (aged 44)
- Height: 5 ft 9 in (175 cm)
- Weight: 165 lb (75 kg; 11 st 11 lb)
- Position: Defence
- Played for: Górnik Katowice; Baildon Katowice
- National team: Poland
- Playing career: 1946–1965

Augustyn Andrzej Skórski (6 November 1936 – 22 January 1981) was a Polish ice hockey player. He played for Górnik Katowice and Baildon Katowice during his career. He won the Polish league championship in 1958 with Górnik. Skórski also played for the Polish national team at the 1964 Winter Olympics and several World Championships.

He died aged 44 in a road accident.
