= Delmon =

Delmon may refer to:

- Delmon University for Science & Technology, former university in Bahrain
- Dilmun, ancient polity in Arabia
- Delmon Baker, Trinidad and Tobago politician
- Delmon Young (born 1985), American baseball player

== See also ==
- Delnon, a surname
