= Ledenice =

- Market town
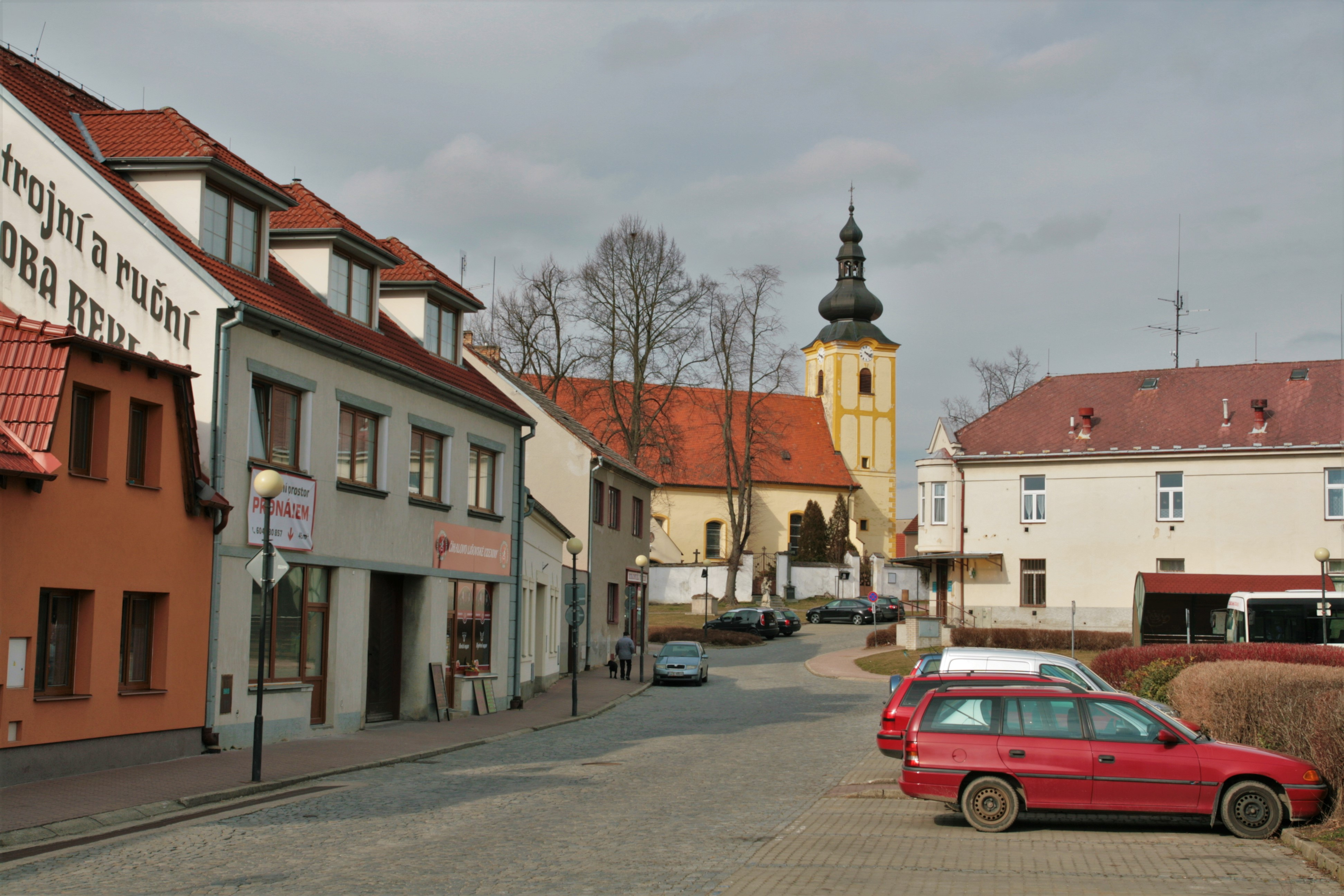
- Centre of Ledenice

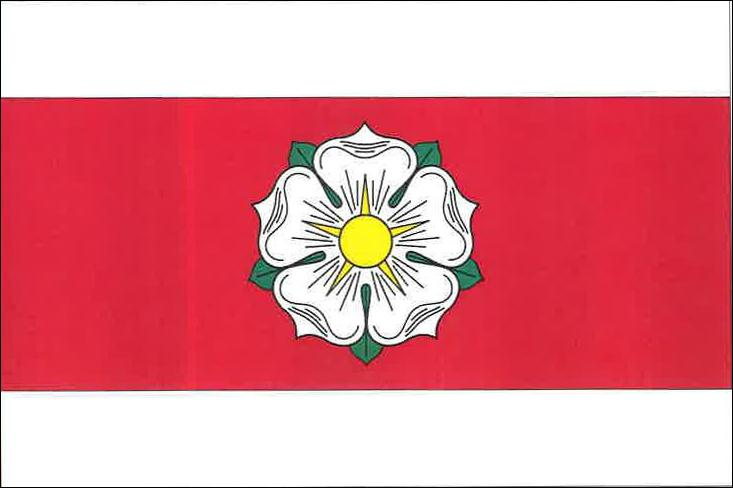
- Flag Coat of arms

- Location in the Czech Republic
- Coordinates: 48°56′0″N 14°37′8″E
- Country: Czech Republic
- Region: South Bohemian
- District: České Budějovice
- First mentioned: 1278

Area
  - Total: 34.55 km^{2} (13.34 sq mi)
- Elevation: 491 m (1,611 ft)

Population (2026-01-01)
  - Total: 2,528
  - Density: 73.17/km^{2} (189.5/sq mi)
- Time zone: UTC+1 (CET)
  - Summer (DST): UTC+2 (CEST)
- Postal codes: 370 06, 373 11, 373 12
- Website: www.ledenice.cz

Ledenice (Czech pronunciation: [ˈlɛdɛɲɪtsɛ]) is a market town in České Budějovice District in the South Bohemian Region of the Czech Republic. It has about 2,500 inhabitants.

== Administrative division ==
Ledenice consists of six municipal parts (in brackets population according to the 2021 census):

- Ledenice (1,844)
- Ohrazení (139)
- Ohrazeníčko (96)
- Růžov (15)
- Zaliny (114)
- Zborov (196)

== Etymology ==
The oldest record of the name was Leděnice. The name was derived from the personal name Leděn, meaning "the village of Leděn's people".

== Geography ==
Ledenice is located about 11 kilometres (7 mi) southeast of České Budějovice. It lies mostly in the Třeboň Basin, only a small part of the municipal territory in the south extends into the Gratzen Foothills. The highest point is at 555 m (1,821 ft) above sea level. The stream Spolský potok flows through the market town. The area of Ledenice is rich in small fishponds, supplied by the Spolský potok and its nameless tributary.

== History ==
The first written mention of Ledenice is from 1278, when it was owned by the Lords of Krumlov (a branch of the house of Vítkovci). After they died out, Ledenice became the property of the Lords of Landštejn (another branch of Vítkovci). In 1398, during their rule, Ledenice was promoted to a market town. In the 15th century, Ledenice was acquired by the Rosenberg family.

In 1611, after the death of the last Rosenberg, the market town became a property of the Schwamberg family. From 1660 until the establishment of an independent municipality in 1849, it was owned by the Schwarzenberg family. The greatest growth of Ledenice occurred in the second half of the 19th century.

== Demographics ==
Historical population

Year	Pop.	±%
1869	2,223	—
1880	2,423	+9.0%
1890	2,409	−0.6%
1900	2,390	−0.8%
1910	2,562	+7.2%

Year	Pop.	±%
1921	2,467	−3.7%
1930	2,466	−0.0%
1950	2,170	−12.0%
1961	2,229	+2.7%
1970	2,060	−7.6%

Year	Pop.	±%
1980	2,038	−1.1%
1991	2,039	+0.0%
2001	2,146	+5.2%
2011	2,329	+8.5%
2021	2,404	+3.2%

Source: Censuses

== Transport ==
A railway runs through the municipal territory, but there is no train station. The market town is served by the station in neighbouring Borovany.

== Sights ==
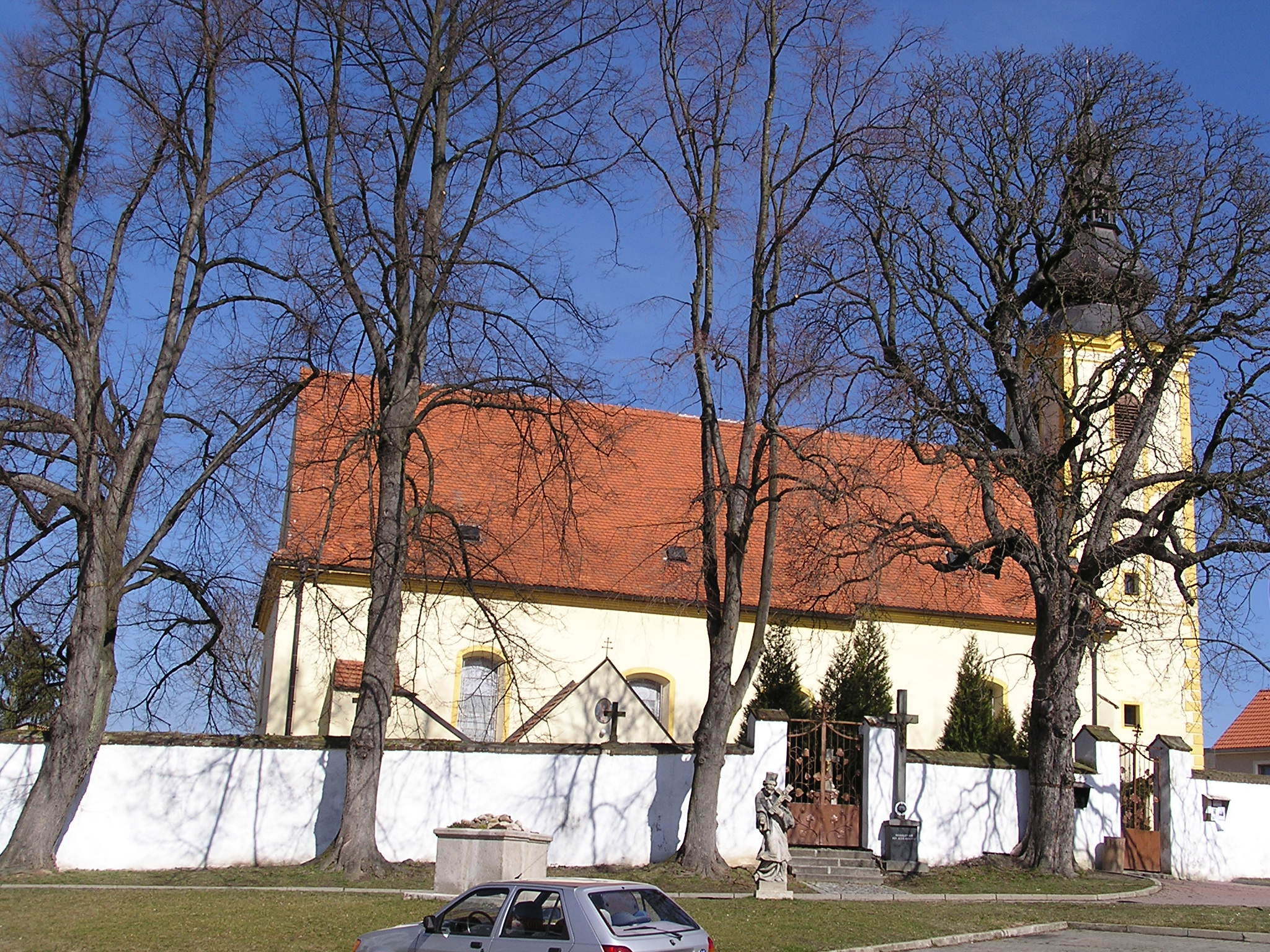
Church of Saint Lawrence

The main landmark of Ledenice is the Church of Saint Lawrence. Originally an early Gothic building from the end of the 13th century, it was rebuilt several times. In 1782, the tower was added.

== Notable people ==
- Josef Stejskal (1897–1942), theatre director
- Vlastimil Hajšman (1928–1978), ice hockey player
