= Josef Stejskal =

Josef Stejskal may refer to:

- Josef Stejskal (artist), Czech-born Australian poster artist
- Josef Stejskal (dramatist) (1897–1942), Czech theatre director
