= Sekyra =

Sekyra (feminine: Sekyrová) is a Czech surname, literally meaning 'axe'. Notable people with the surname include:

- Ivan Sekyra, (1952−2012) Czech musician
- Ivana Sekyrová (born 1971), Czech athlete
- Jiří Sekyra (1929–1977), Czech ice hockey player
- Luděk Sekyra (born 1964), Czech entrepreneur
