= Jirotka =

Jirotka is a surname. Notable people with the surname include:

- Drahomír Jirotka (1915-1958), Czechoslovak ice hockey player
- Marina Jirotka, professor of human-centered computing at the University of Oxford
- Zdeněk Jirotka (1911-2003), Czechoslovak writer
- Zdeněk Jirotka (ice hockey) (1914-1981), Czech ice hockey player
