= Ledvice =

- Town
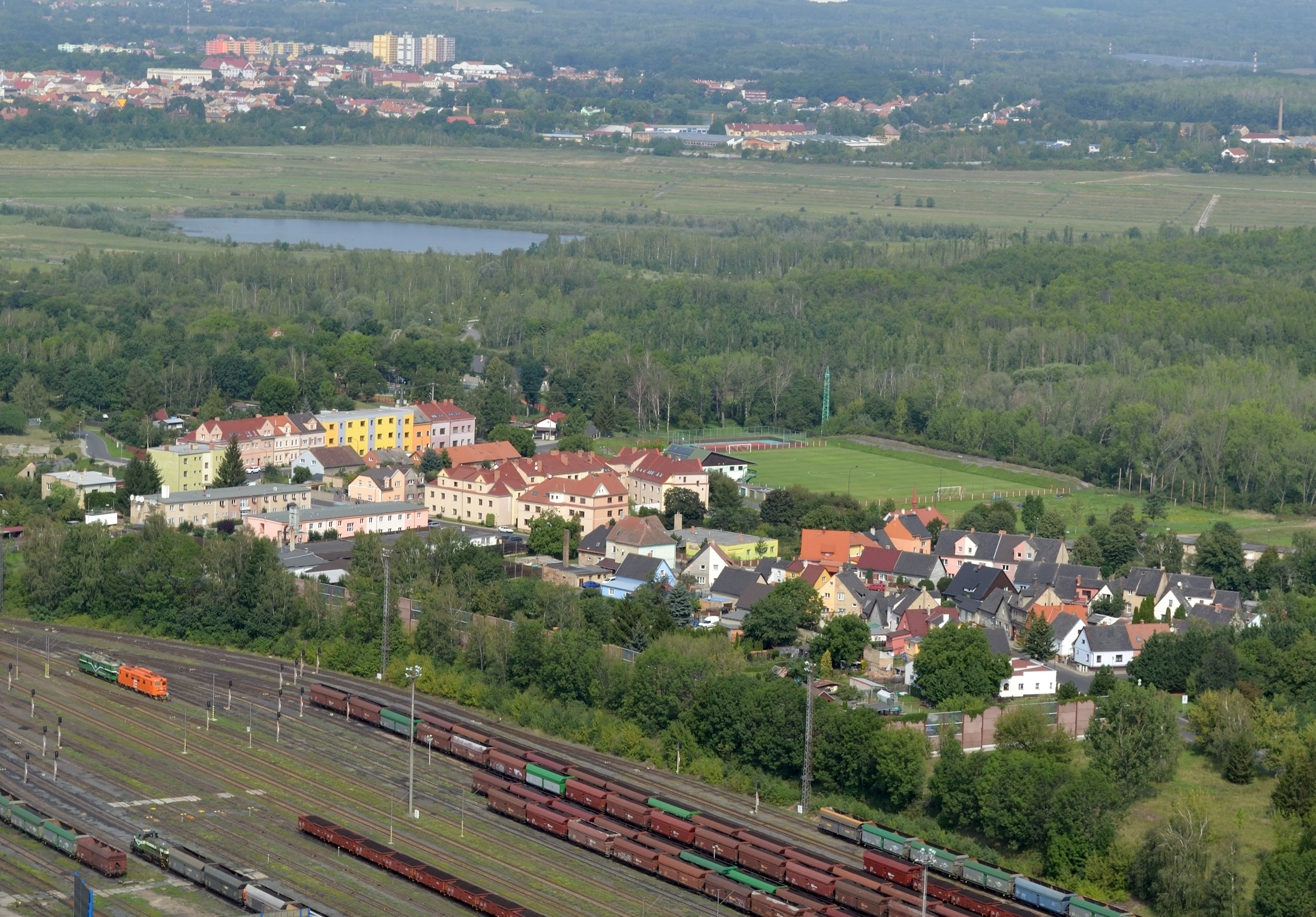
- Ledvice seen from the Ledvice power plant

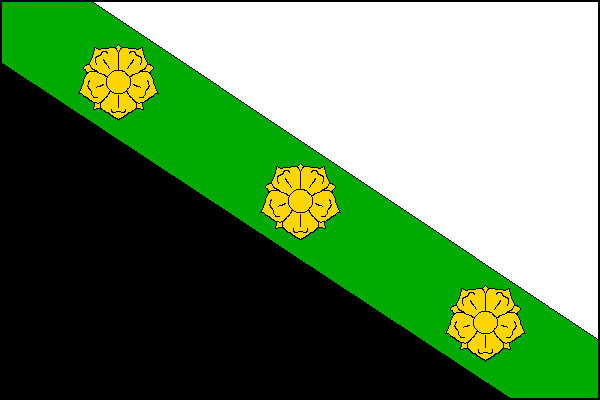
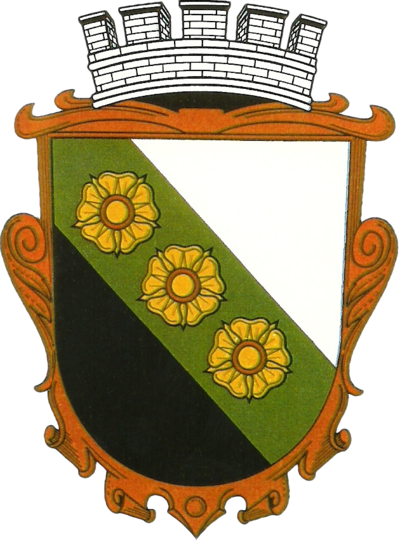
- Flag Coat of arms

- Location in the Czech Republic
- Coordinates: 50°35′18″N 13°45′58″E
- Country: Czech Republic
- Region: Ústí nad Labem
- District: Teplice
- First mentioned: 1209

Government
  - Mayor: Zdeněk Javůrek

Area
  - Total: 4.97 km^{2} (1.92 sq mi)
- Elevation: 204 m (669 ft)

Population (2026-01-01)
  - Total: 540
  - Density: 110/km^{2} (280/sq mi)
- Time zone: UTC+1 (CET)
  - Summer (DST): UTC+2 (CEST)
- Postal code: 417 72
- Website: www.ledvice.cz

Ledvice (Czech pronunciation: [ˈlɛdvɪtsɛ]; German: Ladowitz) is a town in Teplice District in the Ústí nad Labem Region of the Czech Republic. It has about 500 inhabitants. The town is located in the Most Basin, in the middle of a lignite mining area. Due to the expansion of open-pit lignite mining, the town's population decreased significantly in the second half of the 20th century.

== Etymology ==
The name was derived from the personal name Ledva, meaning "the village of Ledva's people".

== Geography ==
Ledvice is located about 6 kilometres (4 mi) southwest of Teplice. It lies in the Most Basin. The highest point is at 229 m (751 ft) above sea level. The western part of the municipality is formed by the Bílina Quarry.

== History ==
The first written mention of Ledvice is from 1204. The people's livelihood was agriculture, later the production of porcelain also developed. Until the establishment of an independent municipality in 1850, the village belonged to the Duchcov estate. In the 19th century, the region became a centre for lignite mining, which led to an increase in the population. In 1898, Ledvice was promoted to a market town. In 1911, Emperor Franz Joseph I promoted Ledvice to the status of a town.

In 1938–1945, the town was annexed by Nazi Germany and administered as part of the Reichsgau Sudetenland. After World War II, the German inhabitants were expelled. In the following decades, deep mining was gradually replaced by open-pit mining, which resulted in the liquidation of a large part of the town and caused a significant decrease in the number of inhabitants.

== Demographics ==
Historical population

Year	Pop.	±%
1869	413	—
1880	1,728	+318.4%
1890	3,309	+91.5%
1900	4,065	+22.8%
1910	4,466	+9.9%

Year	Pop.	±%
1921	4,193	−6.1%
1930	4,458	+6.3%
1950	2,435	−45.4%
1961	2,123	−12.8%
1970	657	−69.1%

Year	Pop.	±%
1980	541	−17.7%
1991	447	−17.4%
2001	529	+18.3%
2011	551	+4.2%
2021	508	−7.8%

Source: Censuses

== Transport ==
The Děčín–Kadaň railway line runs along the eastern municipal border, but there is no train station.

== Sights ==
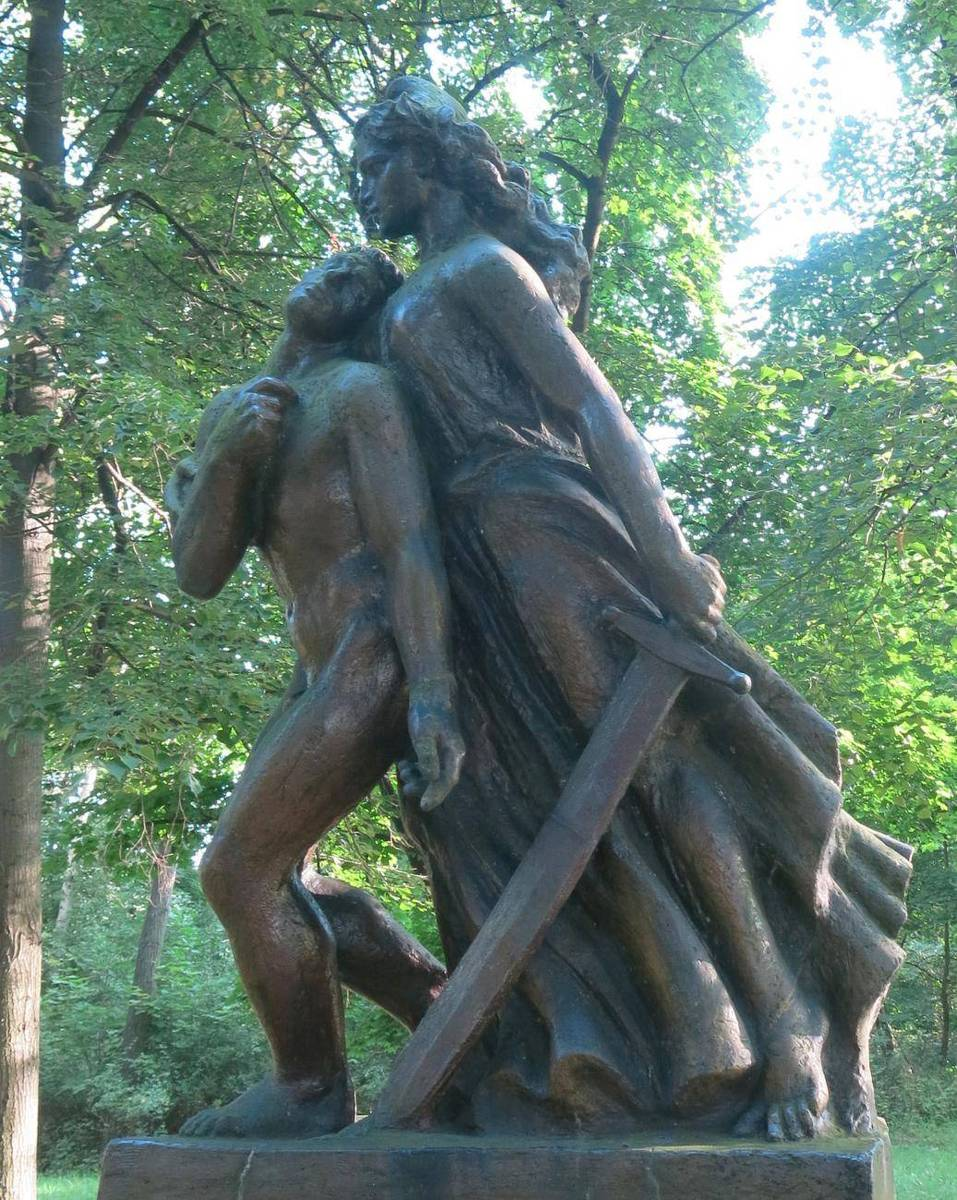
Monument to the Fallen in World War I and II

The only protected cultural monument in Ledvice is the Monument to the Fallen in World War I and II. The sculptural group was created in 1947 and surpasses other similar monuments in quality of workmanship and originality.

== Notable people ==
- Kurt Lehovec (1918–2012), Czech-American physicist
- Jaromír Bünter (1930–2015), ice hockey player
