= Lipůvka =

- Municipality
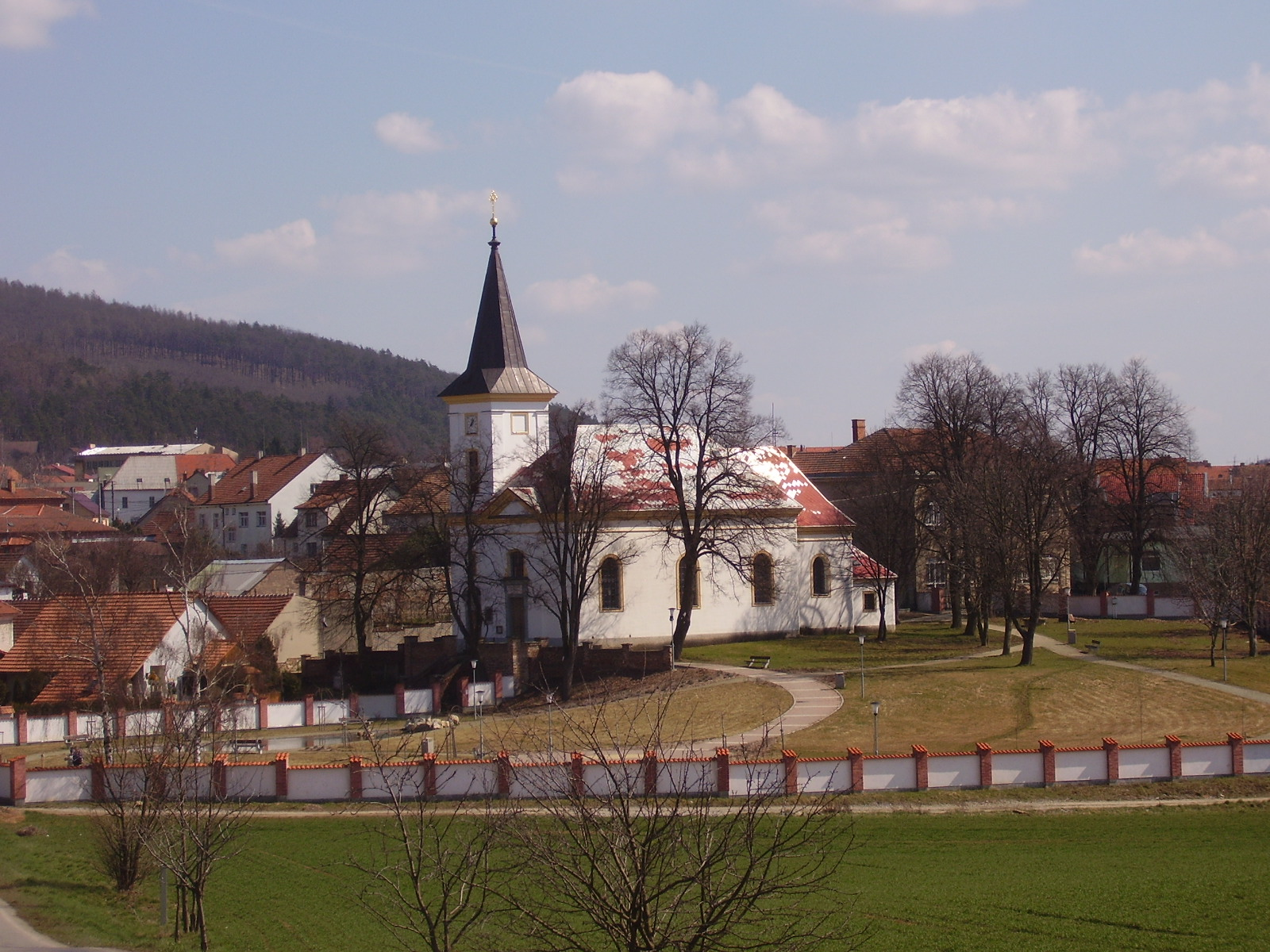
- Church of Saint Cecilia

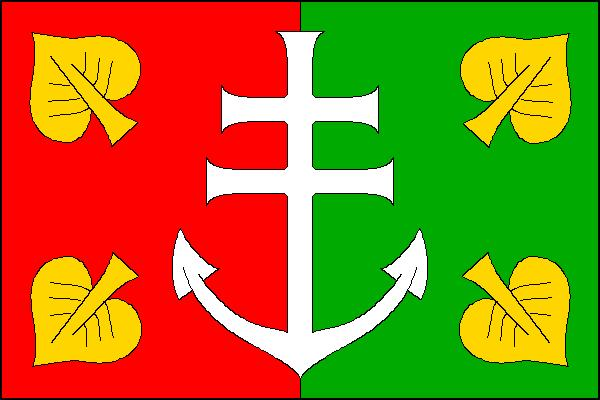
- Flag Coat of arms

- Location in the Czech Republic
- Coordinates: 49°20′25″N 16°33′11″E
- Country: Czech Republic
- Region: South Moravian
- District: Blansko
- First mentioned: 1371

Area
  - Total: 9.92 km^{2} (3.83 sq mi)
- Elevation: 364 m (1,194 ft)

Population (2026-01-01)
  - Total: 1,516
  - Density: 153/km^{2} (396/sq mi)
- Time zone: UTC+1 (CET)
  - Summer (DST): UTC+2 (CEST)
- Postal code: 679 07
- Website: www.lipuvka.eu

Lipůvka is a municipality and village in Blansko District in the South Moravian Region of the Czech Republic. It has about 1,500 inhabitants.

== Geography ==
Lipůvka is located about 7 kilometres (4 mi) west of Blansko and 13 km (8 mi) north of Brno. It lies on the border between the Bobrava Highlands and Drahany Highlands. The highest point is near the top of the hill Bukovec at 592 m (1,942 ft) above sea level.

== History ==
The first written mention of Lipůvka is from 1371.

== Demographics ==
Historical population

Year	Pop.	±%
1869	533	—
1880	597	+12.0%
1890	645	+8.0%
1900	634	−1.7%
1910	690	+8.8%

Year	Pop.	±%
1921	726	+5.2%
1930	760	+4.7%
1950	823	+8.3%
1961	775	−5.8%
1970	841	+8.5%

Year	Pop.	±%
1980	953	+13.3%
1991	1,086	+14.0%
2001	1,092	+0.6%
2011	1,244	+13.9%
2021	1,461	+17.4%

Source: Censuses

== Transport ==
The I/43 road (part of European route E461), which connects Brno with Svitavy, runs through the municipality.

== Sights ==
The main landmark of Lipůvka is the Church of Saint Cecilia. It was built in the late Baroque style in 1750 and extended to its present form in 1881.

== Notable people ==
- Slavomír Bartoň (1926–2004), ice hockey player
