= Nesuchyně =

- Municipality
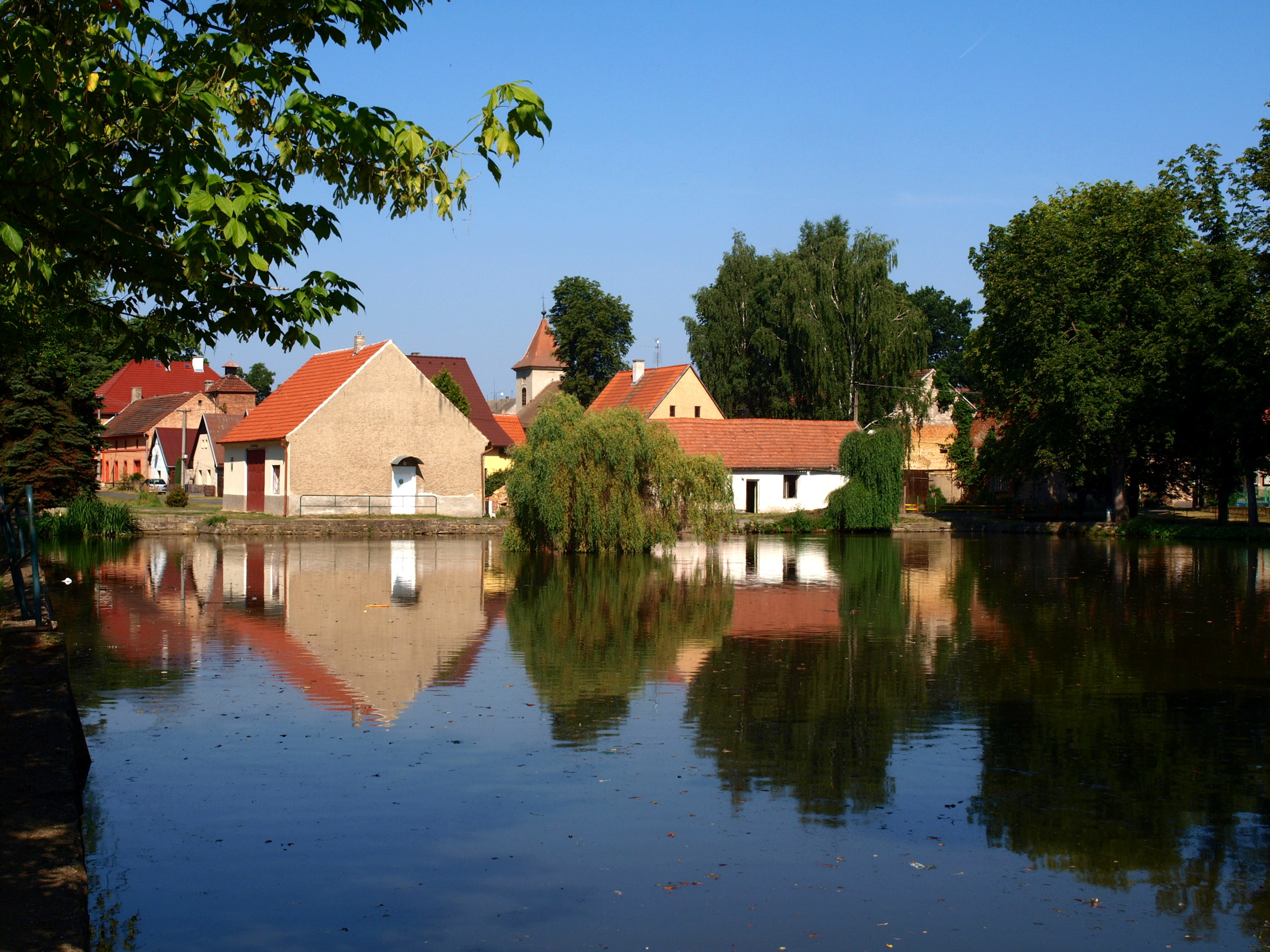
- Centre of Nesuchyně

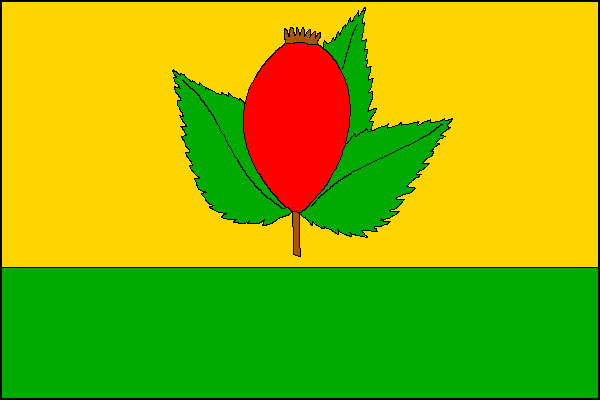
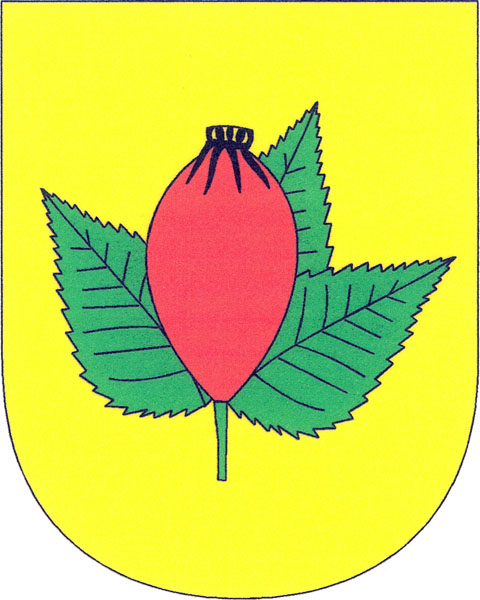
- Flag Coat of arms

- Location in the Czech Republic
- Coordinates: 50°10′47″N 13°41′17″E
- Country: Czech Republic
- Region: Central Bohemian
- District: Rakovník
- First mentioned: 1316

Area
  - Total: 10.64 km^{2} (4.11 sq mi)
- Elevation: 370 m (1,210 ft)

Population (2026-01-01)
  - Total: 452
  - Density: 42.5/km^{2} (110/sq mi)
- Time zone: UTC+1 (CET)
  - Summer (DST): UTC+2 (CEST)
- Postal code: 270 07
- Website: www.obec-nesuchyne.cz

Nesuchyně is a municipality and village in Rakovník District in the Central Bohemian Region of the Czech Republic. It has about 500 inhabitants.

== Demographics ==
Historical population
Year	Pop.	±%
1869	726	—
1880	791	+9.0%
1890	775	−2.0%
1900	817	+5.4%
1910	838	+2.6%
1921	830	−1.0%
1930	820	−1.2%
1950	564	−31.2%
1961	500	−11.3%
1970	465	−7.0%
1980	382	−17.8%
1991	383	+0.3%
2001	379	−1.0%
2011	428	+12.9%
2021	445	+4.0%
Source: Censuses

== Notable people ==
- Miroslav Klůc (1922–2012), ice hockey player
