= Vysoká Pec (Chomutov District) =

- Municipality
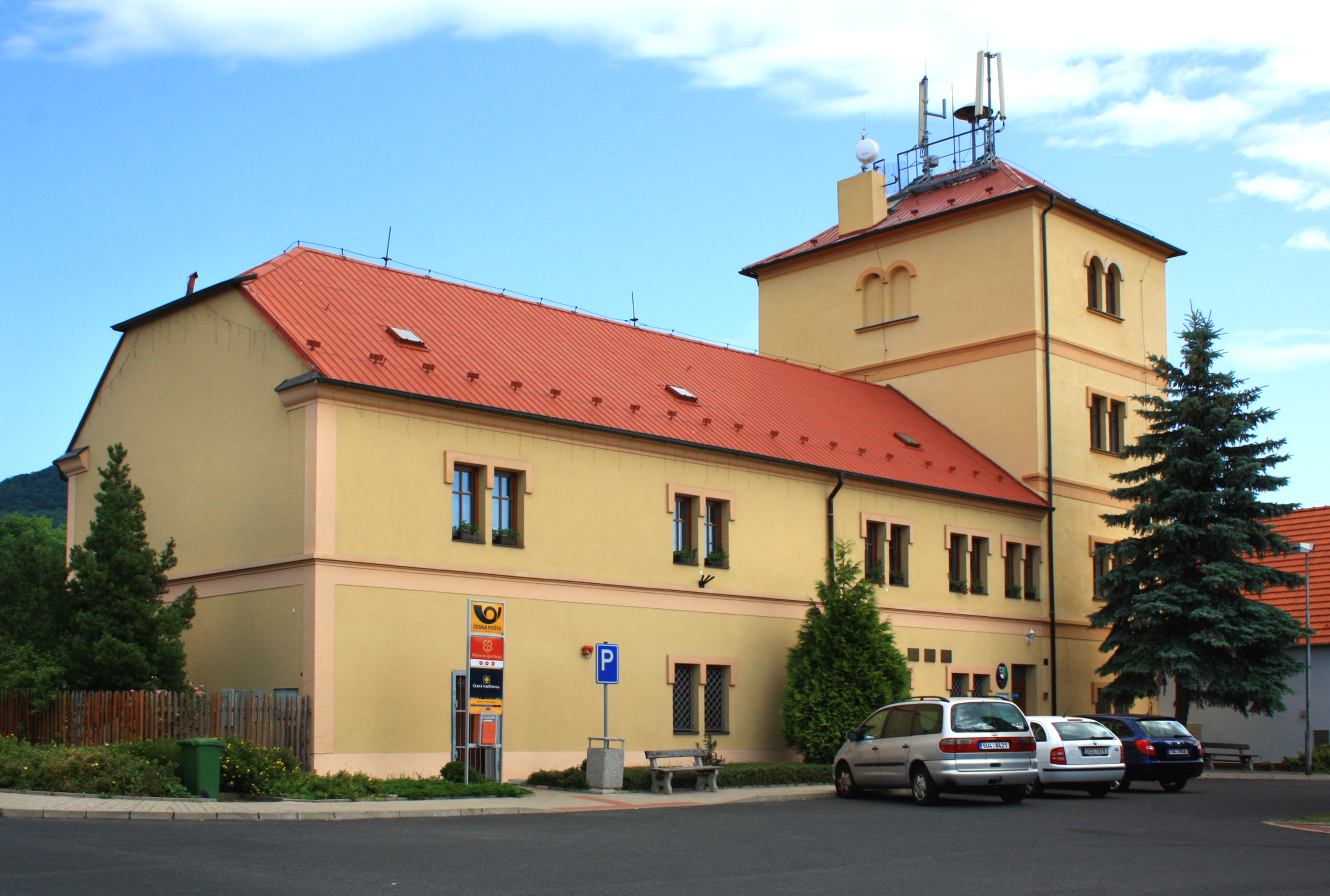
- Municipal office

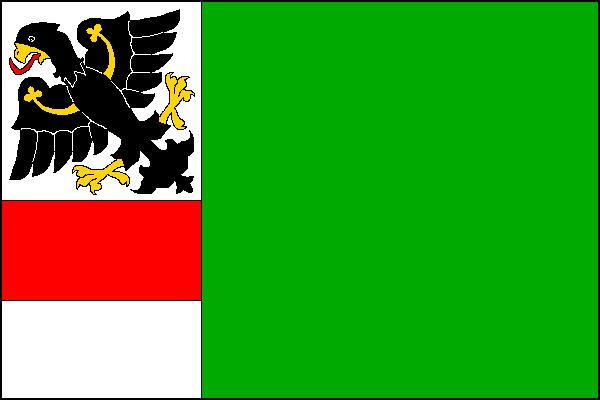
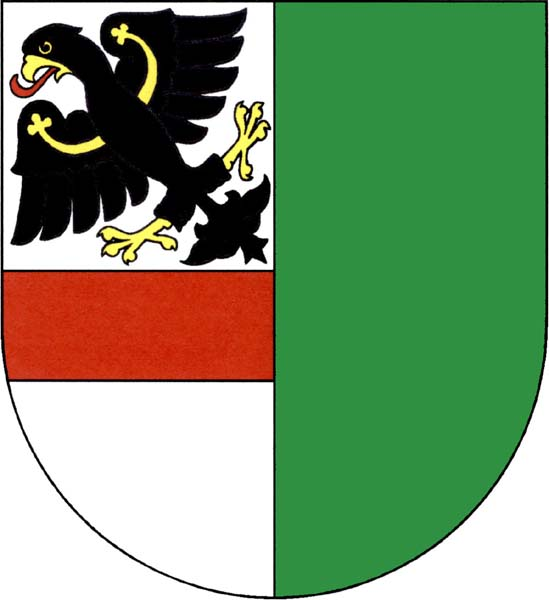
- Flag Coat of arms

- Location in the Czech Republic
- Coordinates: 50°31′13″N 13°28′13″E
- Country: Czech Republic
- Region: Ústí nad Labem
- District: Chomutov
- First mentioned: 1693

Area
  - Total: 19.57 km^{2} (7.56 sq mi)
- Elevation: 336 m (1,102 ft)

Population (2026-01-01)
  - Total: 1,188
  - Density: 60.71/km^{2} (157.2/sq mi)
- Time zone: UTC+1 (CET)
  - Summer (DST): UTC+2 (CEST)
- Postal code: 431 59
- Website: www.vysokapec.cz

Vysoká Pec (German: Hohenofen) is a municipality and village in Chomutov District in the Ústí nad Labem Region of the Czech Republic. It has about 1,200 inhabitants.

Vysoká Pec lies approximately 9 kilometres (6 mi) north-east of Chomutov, 43 km (27 mi) west of Ústí nad Labem, and 84 km (52 mi) north-west of Prague.

== Administrative division ==
Vysoká Pec consists of three municipal parts (in brackets population according to the 2021 census):

- Vysoká Pec (789)
- Drmaly (201)
- Pyšná (73)

== Demographics ==
Historical population
Year	Pop.	±%
1869	1,626	—
1880	1,536	−5.5%
1890	1,634	+6.4%
1900	2,083	+27.5%
1910	2,857	+37.2%
1921	2,895	+1.3%
1930	3,389	+17.1%
1950	2,334	−31.1%
1961	2,272	−2.7%
1970	1,876	−17.4%
1980	735	−60.8%
1991	685	−6.8%
2001	763	+11.4%
2011	985	+29.1%
2021	1,063	+7.9%
Source: Censuses

== Notable people ==
- Kurt Hennrich (1931–2020), German alpine skier
