= Děhylov =

- Municipality
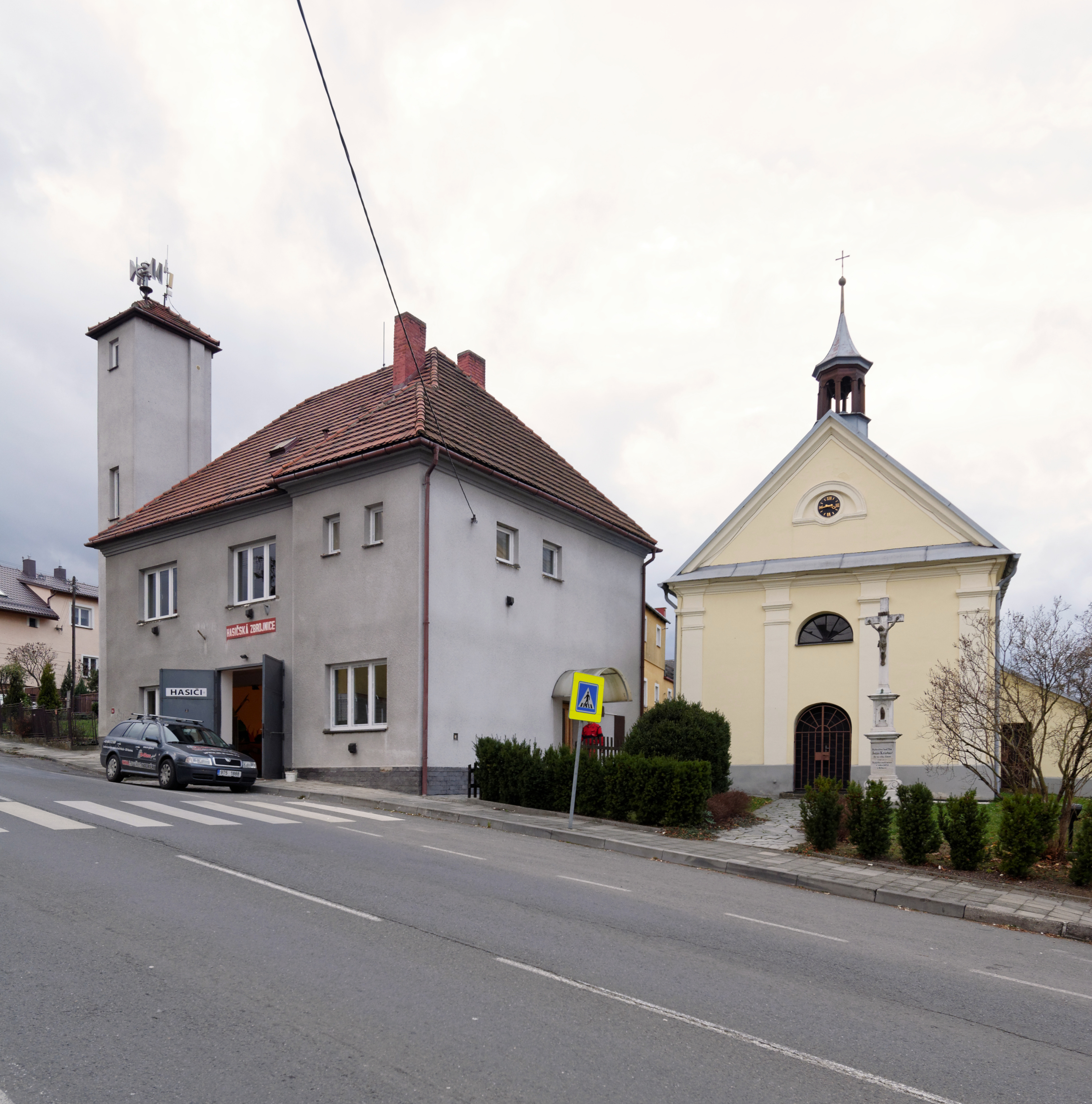
- Chapel of the Visitation of the Virgin Mary

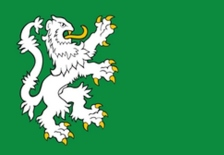
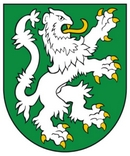
- Flag Coat of arms

- Location in the Czech Republic
- Coordinates: 49°52′10″N 18°9′48″E
- Country: Czech Republic
- Region: Moravian-Silesian
- District: Opava
- First mentioned: 1464

Area
  - Total: 5.08 km^{2} (1.96 sq mi)
- Elevation: 280 m (920 ft)

Population (2026-01-01)
  - Total: 723
  - Density: 142/km^{2} (369/sq mi)
- Time zone: UTC+1 (CET)
  - Summer (DST): UTC+2 (CEST)
- Postal code: 747 94
- Website: www.dehylov.cz

Děhylov (German: Dielhau) is a municipality and village in Opava District in the Moravian-Silesian Region of the Czech Republic. It has about 700 inhabitants.

== Geography ==
Děhylov is located about 5 kilometres (3 mi) northwest of Ostrava. It lies in the eastern tip of the Nízký Jeseník mountain range. It is situated on the right bank of the Opava River, which forms the municipal border. In the eastern part of the municipality is the fishpond Štěpán, protected together with its surroundings as a nature reserve.

== History ==
The first written mention of Děhylov is from 1464. The settlement was founded between 1377 and 1400.

== Demographics ==
Historical population

Year	Pop.	±%
1869	439	—
1880	525	+19.6%
1890	561	+6.9%
1900	660	+17.6%
1910	710	+7.6%

Year	Pop.	±%
1921	719	+1.3%
1930	765	+6.4%
1950	673	−12.0%
1961	677	+0.6%
1970	654	−3.4%

Year	Pop.	±%
1980	661	+1.1%
1991	678	+2.6%
2001	645	−4.9%
2011	664	+2.9%
2021	721	+8.6%

Source: Censuses

== Transport ==
Děhylov is located on the railway line Ostrava–Opava.

== Sights ==
The only protected cultural monument in the municipality is the Chapel of the Visitation of the Virgin Mary. It was built in 1726 and modified in the Empire style in the first half of the 19th century.

== Notable people ==
- Alois Honek (1911–2002), violin maker
- Zdeněk Návrat (1931–2023), ice hockey player
