= Roman Penczek =

Polish ice hockey player

- Born: December 10, 1929; Mysłowice, Poland
- Died: June 3, 1987 (aged 57); Katowice, Poland
- Position: Defence
- Played for: Górnik 09 Mysłowice; Górnik Katowice
- National team: Poland
- Playing career: 1951–1955

Roman Penczek (10 December 1929 – 3 June 1987) was a Polish ice hockey player. He played for Górnik 09 Mysłowice and Górnik Katowice during his career. He also played for the Polish national team at the 1952 Winter Olympics, and the 1955 World Championships. With Górnik Katowice he won the Polish league championship in 1958.
