= Delmon University for Science & Technology =

- جامعة دلمون للعلوم والتكنولوجيا
- Type: Private university
- Active: 2003–2013
- Chairman: Rifa'at Al Fao'ori
- President: Hany Helal
- Dean: Ahmad Arbab
- Location: Manama, Bahrain
- Website: delmon.edu.bh (2013)

Delmon University for Science & Technology (often shortened to Delmon University) was a private university in Manama, Bahrain.

The university was originally conceived in 2003 by its founder, Dr Hassan Al-Qadhi. It was licensed to operate on 6 July 2004. The name derives from Delmon or Dilmun, a land mentioned by Ancient Iraqi civilizations as a source of raw material, which has been speculated to have been in Bahrain.

Degree programs included a Bachelor of Arts in Business Administration.

In 2013, the university's licence was revoked by the Higher Education Council of the Bahraini government. A court case to reverse this decision was lost in 2017.
