= Kurt Hennrich =

Czech alpine skier (1931–2020)

Personal information
- Nationality: Czech
- Born: 28 August 1931; Drmaly (today part of Vysoká Pec), Czechoslovakia
- Died: 28 July 2020 (aged 88)

Sport
- Sport: Alpine skiing

Kurt Hennrich (28 August 1931 – 28 July 2020) was a Czech alpine skier. He competed in three events at the 1956 Winter Olympics. Hennrich was an ethnic German.
