= Bohumil Jauris =

Czech speed skater

Personal information
- Nationality: Czech
- Born: 30 August 1933
- Died: 1992 (aged 58–59)

Sport
- Sport: Speed skating

Bohumil Jauris (30 August 1933 – 1992) was a Czech speed skater. He competed in three events at the 1956 Winter Olympics.
