= Libuše Patočková =

Czech cross-country skier

Personal information
- Nationality: Czech
- Born: 17 March 1933
- Died: 1 January 2010 (aged 76)

Sport
- Sport: Cross-country skiing

Libuše Patočková (17 March 1933 – 1 January 2010) was a Czech cross-country skier. She competed in the women's 10 km and the women's 3 × 5 km relay events at the 1956 Winter Olympics.

== Cross-country skiing results ==
=== Olympic Games ===
Year	Age	10 km	3 × 5 km relay
1956	22	19	6

=== World Championships ===
Year	Age	10 km	3 × 5 km relay
1958	24	—	5
