= Doubek (Prague-East District) =

- Municipality
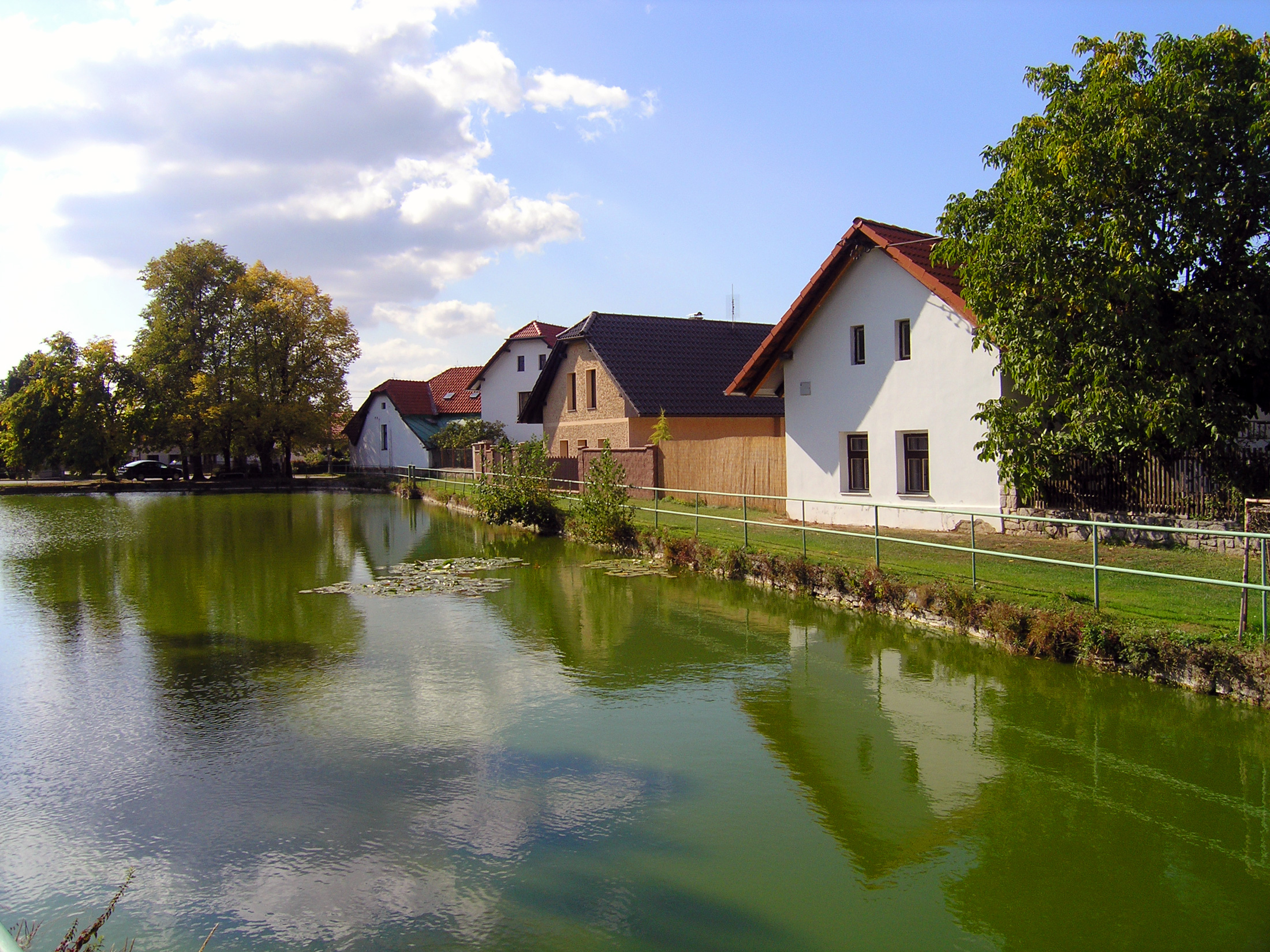
- Common in Doubek

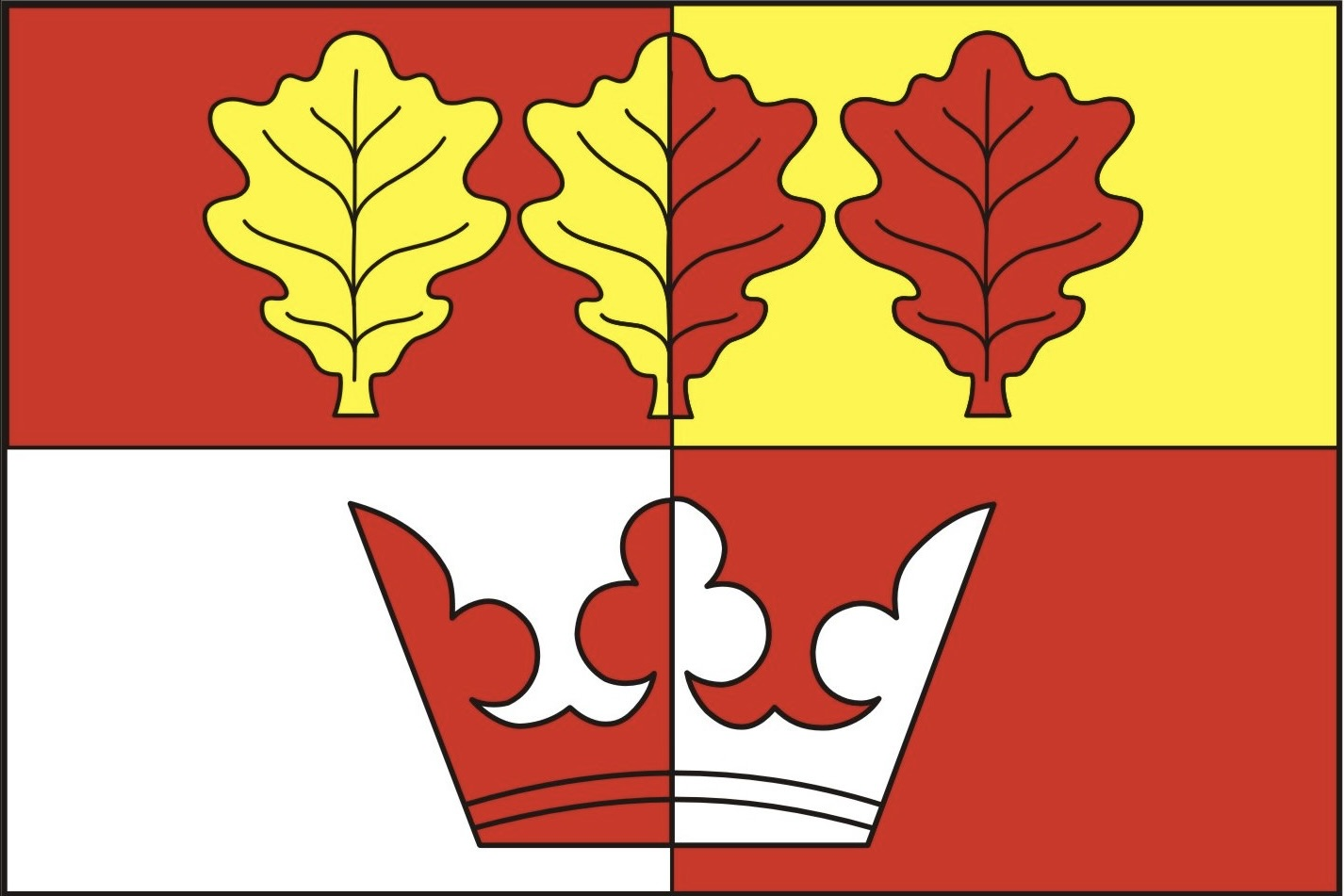
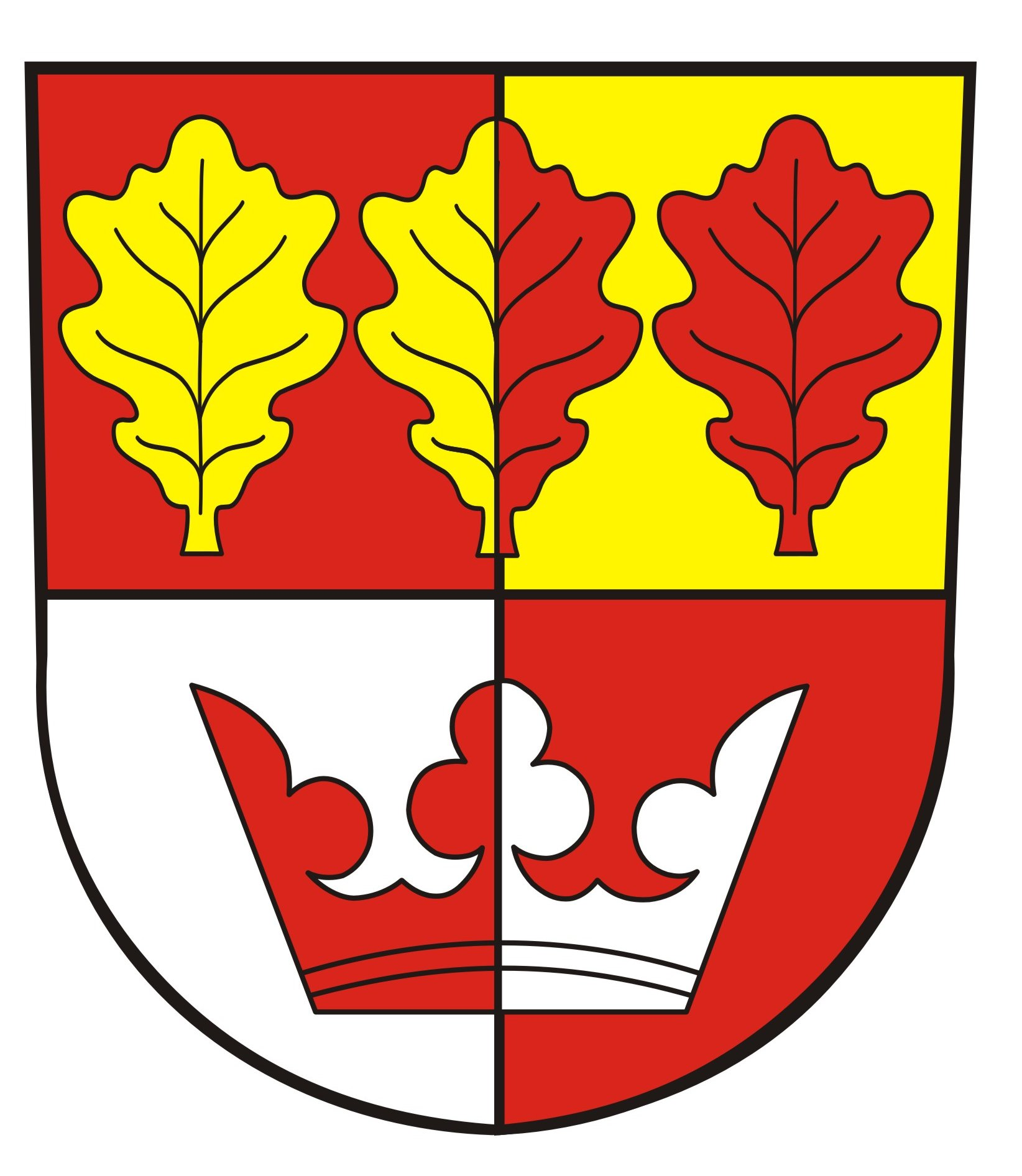
- Flag Coat of arms

- Location in the Czech Republic
- Coordinates: 50°1′4″N 14°44′16″E
- Country: Czech Republic
- Region: Central Bohemian
- District: Prague-East
- First mentioned: 1413

Area
  - Total: 3.68 km^{2} (1.42 sq mi)
- Elevation: 406 m (1,332 ft)

Population (2026-01-01)
  - Total: 480
  - Density: 130/km^{2} (340/sq mi)
- Time zone: UTC+1 (CET)
  - Summer (DST): UTC+2 (CEST)
- Postal code: 251 01
- Website: obecdoubek.cz

Doubek is a municipality and village in Prague-East District in the Central Bohemian Region of the Czech Republic. It has about 500 inhabitants.

== Demographics ==
Historical population
Year	Pop.	±%
1869	336	—
1880	392	+16.7%
1890	373	−4.8%
1900	397	+6.4%
1910	401	+1.0%
1921	381	−5.0%
1930	350	−8.1%
1950	277	−20.9%
1961	267	−3.6%
1970	223	−16.5%
1980	186	−16.6%
1991	155	−16.7%
2001	152	−1.9%
2011	261	+71.7%
2021	543	+108.0%
Source: Censuses
