= Rudolf Czech =

Polish ice hockey player

- Born: September 15, 1930 Opole, Poland
- Died: September 8, 1975 (aged 44) Krefeld, West Germany
- Position: Centre
- Shot: Right
- Played for: Budowlani Opole; Odra Opole; Legia Warsaw
- National team: Poland
- Playing career: 1951–1958

Rudolf Karl Czech (15 September 1930 – 8 September 1975) was a Polish ice hockey player. He played for Budowlani Opole, Odra Opole, and Legia Warsaw during his career. He also played for the Polish national team at the 1952 and 1956 Winter Olympics, and the 1955, 1957, and 1958 World Championships. He won the Polish league championship four years in a row with Legia, from 1954 to 1957. In 1958 while in West Germany for a tournament, Czech defected, joining family already living there. He moved to Düsseldorf, and died suddenly in 1975 while in Krefeld.
