= Otto Schläpfer =

Swiss ice hockey player

- Born: March 11, 1931; Switzerland
- Died: 2015 (aged 83–84)
- Position: Centre
- Played for: Lausanne HC; Zürcher SC; EHC Kloten; HC Davos
- National team: Switzerland
- Playing career: 1947–1972

Otto Schläpfer (March 11, 1931 – 2015) was a Swiss ice hockey player who played for the Switzerland men's national ice hockey team at the 1952 and 1956 Olympics. He also played for Lausanne HC, Zürcher SC, EHC Kloten, and HC Davos between 1947 and 1972.
