= Eva Lauermanová =

Czech cross-country skier

Personal information
- Nationality: Czech
- Born: 14 March 1931 Prague, Czechoslovakia

Sport
- Sport: Cross-country skiing

Eva Lauermanová (born 14 March 1931) is a Czech cross-country skier. She competed in the women's 10 km and the women's 3 × 5 km relay events at the 1956 Winter Olympics.

== Cross-country skiing results ==
=== Olympic Games ===
Year	Age	10 km	3 × 5 km relay
1956	24	14	6

=== World Championships ===
Year	Age	10 km	3 × 5 km relay
1954	22	—	5
