= Roy Strandem =

Norwegian ice hockey player

Personal information
- Born: 5 April 1932 (age 94) Oslo, Norway

Sport
- Sport: Ice hockey

Roy Strandem (born 5 April 1932) is a Norwegian ice hockey player, born in Oslo, Norway. He played for the Norwegian national ice hockey team, and participated at the Winter Olympics in 1952, where the Norwegian team placed 9th.
