= Martin Stejskal =

Czech painter and writer (born 1944)

- Born: 19 February 1944 (age 82); Prague, Protectorate of Bohemia and Moravia
- Occupations: Painter, essayist
- Writing career
- Period: 20th century
- Genre: Peinture
- Movement: Surrealism

Martin Stejskal (born 19 February 1944) is a Czech painter, graphic artist, translator, occasional poet, essayist, and author of texts and books dealing with different aspects of Hermeticism.

== Career ==
Stejskal had decisive encounters with poet Karel Šebek (1963) and hermetist Theofanus Abba (1972). Šebek was an important poet from the Czech Surrealists circle from the 1960s. He disappeared in 2004. Theofanus Abba (the civic name of Josef Louda) was a Czech hermetic.

Since 1968 he has worked with Czech and Slovak surrealists. Stejskal authored interpretation methods, for instance contourages and phased illusions. He creates computer graphics (so-called digitages) and original computer animations. He lives in Prague.

== Selected individual exhibitions ==
- Hra proti „hře“/ A Game Against “the Game’’ (Dům uměni, Brno, Czech Republic 1972)
- Peintures et dessins (L’envers du miroir Gallery, Paris France 1972)
- Zjištené polohy / Estahlished Positions (Zemědělské museum, Lednice, Czech Republic 1985)
- Imaginace prostoru / The imagination of Space (Juniorklub Chmelnice, Prague, Czech Republic 1985)
- Zadem k nekonečnu / Backward to the Infinity (Palác kultury, Galerie Vyšehrad, Prague, Czech Republic 1990)
- Problem merkuryáse / Merkuryas problem (Paseka Gallery, Prague, Czech Republic 1992)
- Dva čeští surrealisté / Two Czech Surrealists (H. Beekman's cabinet, Alkmaar Holland //with J. Švankmajer/ 1992)
- Strážci prahu / Guardians of the Threshold (Paseka Gallery, Prague, Czech Republic 1997)
- Bít či nebít? / To Beat or Not to Beat? (Shamballa Gallery, Copenhagen, Denmark, 1998)
- Zadem k nekonečnu II / Backward to Infinity II - a selection of works 1968-2002 ( Galerie moderniho uměni, Hradec Kralové, Alšova Jihočeská Gallery České Budějovice, Galerie vytvarného uměni, Cheb, Czech Republic 2003).

== Publications in English / French ==
- 1971 : Pas à pas, Face arrière des nouveaux tableaux, B.L.S, réédition Savelli 1978, no. 4. p. 32. Paris
- 1974 : Maisons, 14 lithos accompagnées de poèmes de Vincent Bounoure, Collection du B.L.S., Paris
- 1976 : La civilisation surréaliste, collection de textes choisis présenté par Vincent Bounoure, La rélation cérémonielle, Payot, Paris, p. 307. ISBN 2-228-54050-1
- 1977 : Sans cesse en rond, voix off, cycle de métamorphoses, avec le text de Jean-Louis Bédouin, revue Surréalisme, ed. Savelli, Paris, p. 24–28.
- 1989 : Prague, Secrets et métamorphoses, article La Prague des alchimistes, p. 129–137, ed. Autrement, Paris
- 1997 : Secrets de la Prague magique, ed. Dauphin, Prague, ISBN 80-86019-37-3
- 2003 : Praga hermetica (La guide ésotérique à travers Route royale), ed. Eminent, Prague, ISBN 80-7281-140-1
- 2004 : Porte arrière à l'infini, monographie de M. S., Prague, ISBN 80-85025-36-1
- 2014 : Prague insolite et secrète, (photo: Jana Stejskalová), ed. Jonglez, Paris. 2. ed. 2018. ISBN 978-2-36195-019-4
- 2018 : Tarot Alchymicus T. Abbae, card game, lat. and engl., ed. Vodnář.
