= Georges Delnon =

Swiss theatre director

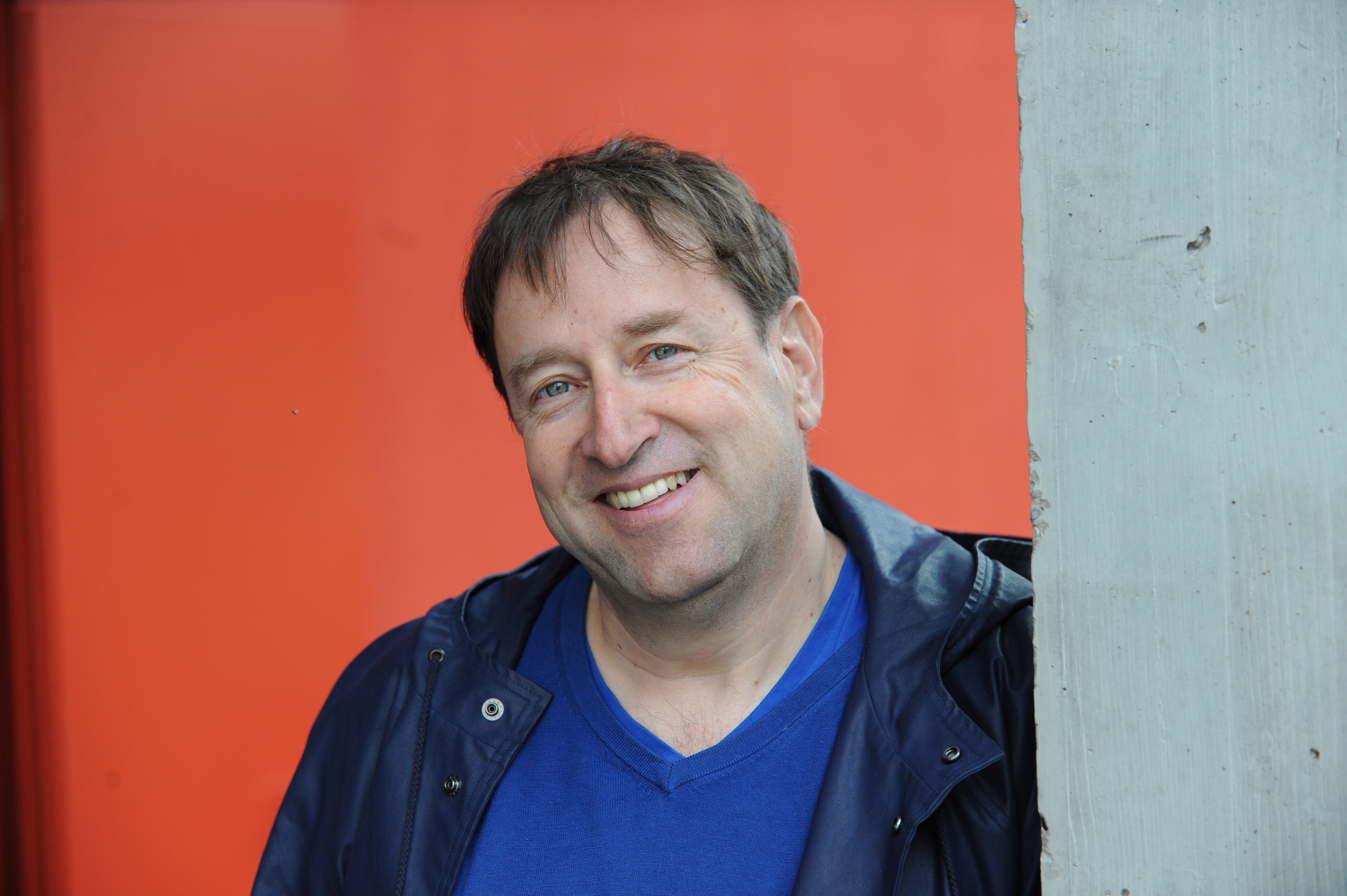
- Georges Delnon 2014 (Peter Schnetz)
- Born: 20 March 1958 (age 67); Zürich, Switzerland
- Education: Art history, musicology, musical composition
- Occupation(s): Theatre director, artistic director and professor

Georges Delnon (born 20 March 1958) is a Swiss theatre director, artistic director and professor. From 2006 to 2015 he was the artistic director of the Theater Basel and he took over the management of the Hamburg State Opera in 2015.

== Life ==
Delnon grew up in Bern. After his studies in art history and musicology at the University of Bern and University of Fribourg as well as composition at the Musikschule Konservatorium Bern. He produced his first productions in opera and play in Bern, Lucerne and at the Theater Orchester Biel Solothurn.

His focus soon began to shift towards premieres of Musical theatres like 22.13 by Mark Andre (Munich Biennale, Festival d'Automne à Paris, Paris Opera); Hellhörig by Carola Bauckholt (Munich Biennale/Theater Basel), Der Alte vom Berge by Bernhard Lang (Schwetzingen Festival/Theater Basel); and 3 Frauen by Wolfgang Rihm (Theater Basel). Additionally, he did many stagings in Europe, America and Asia, which were followed by his first movie productions.

As a professor, Delnon began at the Folkwang University of the Arts, moving on to working in Frankfurt, Montepulciano and Basel. In 2002 he received a professorship for scenic plays at the Hochschule für Musik Mainz. In the fall semester of 2014 he will be also working at the University of Zürich as a guest lecturer.

As an artistic director Delnon's career began at the Theater Koblenz (1996–1999), followed by the Staatstheater Mainz (until 2006) and the Theater Basel (until 2015), where he won the award Opera house of the year two times in a row (2009/2010). From 2009 to 2016 he was the artistic director of the Schwetzingen Festival. Since 2015 he has been artistic director (Intendant) of the Hamburg State Opera and the Hamburg Philharmonic State Orchestra.

== Awards and honors ==
In 2003 he was named honorary Professor of the University of Mainz and received the Order of Merit of Rhineland-Palatinate. Since 2002 Delnon is a member of the Deutsche Akademie der Darstellenden Künste.

== Stagings (selection) ==
- Carmen and Die Fledermaus for Frankfurt Opera
- Dido in Toulouse
- The Rape of Lucretia for Deutsche Oper am Rhein, Düsseldorf, and for Theater Basel
- Traviata, Butterfly and Liebe zu den drei Orangen in Dortmund
- Fräulein Julie (Miss Julie) in Essen
- La Griselda (Vivaldi) in Geneva
- Der junge Lord (Henze), Maria Stuart and Ezio (Händel-Festspiele Karlsruhe)
- Parsifal, Jenufa and Medea in Saarbrücken at the Saarländisches Staatstheater
- Schwarze Spinne (Sutermeister), Das Lachen der Schafe (Demierre) and König für einen Tag (Grünauer) in Lucerne
- Hoffmanns Erzählungen in Hanover
- Carmen, Lulu, Saul, the premiere of G by G. Bryars and Don Giovanni in Mainz
- Ubu Rex for the Teatro Colón in Buenos Aires
- Juditha triumphans by Antonio Vivaldi for the festival at Kammeroper Schloss Rheinsberg
- the premiere of 22,13 by Mark Andre for the Munich Biennale, Mainz and the Festival d'Automne à Paris/Paris Opera
- Il figlio delle selve, the premiere of Fredrik Zeller's Zaubern and Proserpina by Krauss at the Schwetzingen Festival
- Hellhörig (premiere) by Carola Bauckholt for the Munich Biennale
- Drei Frauen (premiere) by Wolfgang Rihm at the Theater Basel

== Filmography ==
- As director
  - Aida am Rhein for the Schweizer Fernsehen and 3sat (2010)
  - Re:igen, Musikfilm Coproduction ZKM/Südwestrundfunk (2014)
- As actor
  - in Edgar Reitz's film version of Heimat (2004)
  - in the Hunkeler crime thriller Hunkeler und die Augen des Ödipus, SRF (2012)

== Writings ==
- A contribution in Elke Heidenreich's book Ein Traum von Musik
