= Vlastimil Melich =

Czech Nordic skier (1928–1978)

Vlastimil Melich (7 April 1928 in Vysoké nad Jizerou – 2 August 1978) was a Czech Nordic skier who competed for Czechoslovakia in the 1950s. At the 1952 Winter Olympics, he finished 16th in the Nordic combined event, 29th in the 18 km cross-country skiing event, and eighth in the 4 × 10 km cross country skiing relay.

Melich competed at the 1956 Winter Olympics, where he was eight in the 4 × 10 cross-country relay and 18th in the Nordic combined, and 1960 Winter Olympics, where he again finished 18th in the Nordic combined event.
