= Jan Vodička =

Czech ice hockey player

Jan Vodička (13 April 1932 – 28 September 2014) was a Czechoslovak ice hockey goaltender who competed in the 1956 Winter Olympics. He was born in České Budějovice, Czechoslovakia and died after a short illness in September 2014.

The first man with trapper in Czechoslovakia.
