= Zdeněk Jirotka (ice hockey) =

Czech ice hockey player

Personal information
- Nationality: Czech
- Born: 15 February 1914; Prostějov, Austria-Hungary
- Died: 24 May 1981 (aged 67); Indian Rocks Beach, Florida, United States

Sport
- Sport: Ice hockey

Zdeněk Jirotka (15 February 1914 – 24 May 1981) was a Czech ice hockey player. He competed in the men's tournament at the 1936 Winter Olympics.
