= Stanislav Bacílek =

Czech ice hockey player

Personal information
- Born: 13 November 1929 Kladno, Czechoslovakia
- Died: 26 March 1997 (aged 67)

Sport
- Sport: Ice hockey
- Position: Defenceman

Stanislav Bacílek (13 November 1929 – 26 March 1997) was a Czech ice hockey player who competed for Czechoslovakia in the 1956 Winter Olympics.
