= Jiří Tožička =

Czech ice hockey player

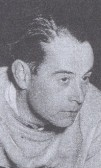
- Born: 14 November 1901 Prague, Austria-Hungary
- Died: 15 May 1981 (aged 79)
- Position: Left wing
- Shot: Left
- Played for: HC Sparta Praha; LTC Praha; 1. CLTK Praha
- National team: Czechoslovakia
- Playing career: 1926–1942

Jiří Tožička (14 November 1901 – 15 May 1981) was a Czech ice hockey player who competed for Czechoslovakia in the 1928 Winter Olympics and in the 1936 Winter Olympics. He was born in Prague. In 1928 he participated with the Czechoslovak team in the Olympic tournament.

Eight years later he was also a member of the Czechoslovak team which finished fourth in the 1936 Olympic tournament.
