= Jaromír Bünter =

Czech ice hockey player

Jaromír Bünter (3 April 1930 in Ledvice – 15 October 2015 in Prague) was a Czech ice hockey player who competed for Czechoslovakia in the 1956 Winter Olympics.
