= 1957–58 Polska Liga Hokejowa season =

Polish ice hockey season

The 1957–58 Polska Liga Hokejowa season was the 23rd season of the Polska Liga Hokejowa, the top level of ice hockey in Poland. Seven teams participated in the league, and Gornik Katowice won the championship.

== Regular season ==
	Club	GP	Goals	Pts
1.	Górnik Katowice	12	113:16	24
2.	Legia Warszawa	12	105:31	20
3.	Podhale Nowy Targ	12	59:58	10
4.	KTH Krynica	12	45:61	10
5.	Piast Cieszyn	12	49:80	10
6.	Start Katowice	12	43:67	8
7.	AZS Warszawa	12	22:123	0
