= Jaroslav Doubek =

Czech speed skater (1931–2017)

Personal information
- Nationality: Czech
- Born: 17 June 1931
- Died: 22 July 2017 (aged 86)

Sport
- Sport: Speed skating

Jaroslav Doubek (17 June 1931 – 22 July 2017) was a Czech speed skater. He competed in two events at the 1956 Winter Olympics.
