= Miroslav Klůc =

Czech ice hockey player

- Born: 1 December 1922; Nesuchyně, Czechoslovakia
- Died: 4 December 2012 (aged 90)
- Occupation: Ice hockey player

Miroslav Klůc (1 December 1922 – 4 December 2012) was a Czech ice hockey player who competed in the 1956 Winter Olympics for Czechoslovakia.
