= Reto Delnon =

Swiss ice hockey player

- Born: May 1, 1924; Switzerland
- Died: November 6, 1983 (aged 59)
- Position: Centre
- National team: Switzerland
- Playing career: 1952–1952

Reto Delnon (May 1, 1924 – November 6, 1983) was a Swiss ice hockey player who competed for the Swiss national team at the 1952 Winter Olympics. In 1962, he was sacked from the role as coach of the Swiss national team due to his membership in the Communist Party of Labour.
