= Zdeněk Návrat =

Czech ice hockey player (1931–2023)

Zdeněk Návrat (25 May 1931 – 18 September 2023) was a Czech ice hockey player who competed in the 1956 Winter Olympics. He was born in Děhylov on 25 May 1931, and died on 18 September 2023, at the age of 92.
