= Ján Jendek =

Slovak ice hockey player

- Born: July 5, 1931; Bratislava, TCH
- Died: December 7, 2002 (aged 71); Bratislava, SVK
- Position: Goaltender
- Caught: Left
- Played for: HC Slovan Bratislava; HC ATK Praha
- National team: Czechoslovakia
- Playing career: 1954–1956

Ján Jendek (5 July 1931 – 7 December 2002) was a Slovak ice hockey goaltender.

Jendek spent the majority of his career with HC Slovan Bratislava. He competed in the 1956 Winter Olympics for Czechoslovakia.
