= Alois Cetkovský =

Czech ice hockey player

Personal information
- Nationality: Czech
- Born: 5 September 1908; Prostějov, Austria-Hungary
- Died: 13 November 1987 (aged 79); Karviná, Czechoslovakia

Sport
- Sport: Ice hockey

Alois Cetkovský (5 September 1908 – 13 November 1987) was a Czech ice hockey player. He competed in the men's tournament at the 1936 Winter Olympics.
