= Zdeněk Pýcha =

Czech ice hockey player (1926–2020)

Zdeněk Pýcha (29 May 1926 – 11 May 2020) was a Czech ice hockey player who competed in the 1952 Winter Olympics. He was born in Prague. He died in May 2020 at the age of 93.
