= Miroslav Nový =

Czech ice hockey player

Personal information
- Born: 1 October 1930; Prague, Czechoslovakia
- Died: 30 May 1988 (aged 57)

Sport
- Sport: Ice hockey
- Position: Defenceman
- Team: HC ATK Praha

Miroslav Nový (1 October 1930 – 30 May 1988) was a Czech ice hockey player who competed in the 1952 Winter Olympics.
