= Miloslav Ošmera =

Czech ice hockey player

Personal information
- Born: 21 January 1924; Třebíč, Czechoslovakia
- Died: 11 March 2001 (aged 77)

Sport
- Sport: Ice hockey
- Position: Defenceman

Miloslav Ošmera (21 January 1924 – 11 March 2001) was a Czech ice hockey player who competed in the 1952 Winter Olympics.
