= Vlastimil Hajšman =

Czech ice hockey player

Vlastimil Hajšman (26 February 1928 in Ledenice – 3 March 1978 in České Budějovice) was a Czech ice hockey player who competed for Czechoslovakia in the 1952 Winter Olympics.
