= Miloslav Charouzd =

Czech ice hockey player

Miloslav Charouzd (15 August 1928 in Prague – 25 June 2001 in Prague) was a Czech ice hockey player who competed in the 1952 Winter Olympics.
