= Oldřich Sedlák =

Czech ice hockey player

Oldřich Sedlák (3 November 1922 – 4 September 1985) was a Czech ice hockey player who competed in the 1952 Winter Olympics.
