= Miloslav Blažek =

Czech ice hockey player

- Born: 22 June 1922 Přívoz, Czechoslovakia
- Died: 19 February 1985 (aged 62) Ostrava, Czechoslovakia
- Position: Forward
- Played for: HC Vitkovice
- National team: Czechoslovakia
- Playing career: 1949–1960
- Coaching career: 1965–1966

Miloslav Blažek (22 June 1922 – 19 February 1985) was a Czech ice hockey player. He represented Czechoslovakia at the 1952 Winter Olympics.

== Life ==
Blažek was born on 22 June 1922 in Přívoz (today part of Ostrava). He died on 19 February 1985 in Ostrava.

== Career ==
Active throughout the 1940s and 1950s, Blažek established himself as a key player for the Czech ice hockey club HC Vítkovice. His talents earned him a place on the national team, with which he competed in numerous international tournaments. Among his most notable appearances was at the 1952 Winter Olympics, where Blažek and his teammates faced some of the strongest hockey nations in the world. The Czechoslovak squad delivered an impressive performance, finishing 4th out of 16 participating teams and securing the second-highest total of medals across the competition.

Overall, Blažek spent his playing career with Vítkovice from 1949 to 1960 and represented the national team between 1949 and 1952. He later returned to Vítkovice as a coach from 1965 to 1966. While with Vítkovice, he achieved significant success, earning a league gold medal in 1952, silver medals in 1950, 1951, and 1953, and a bronze medal in 1958. Although he stepped away from official league play in 1960, finishing with an impressive 127 goals in 180 league appearances, he remained active in coaching roles until 1975.

== Political issues ==
Blažek was an outspoken critic of many of the Soviet Bloc's repressive policies and its control over Czechoslovakia. Because of his candid views on the government and suspicions that he might defect, authorities imposed a travel ban on him from 1953 to 1957, which barred him from taking part in international competitions.

== Legacy ==
A memorial dedicated to Blažek is displayed inside the city hall of his hometown, Ostrava.
