= Josef Stejskal (dramatist) =

Czech dramatist (1897–1942)

- Born: 1897
- Died: 1942 (aged 44–45)
- Occupation: Theatre director

Josef Stejskal (1897–1942) was a Czech theatre director executed by Nazi Germany. Stejskal was appointed director of drama at the Jihočeské divadlo in České Budějovice in 1936.
