= Jozef Záhorský =

Slovak ice hockey player

- Born: 6 January 1929 Bratislava, Czechoslovakia
- Died: 2002 (aged 72–73)
- Position: Goaltender

Jozef Záhorský (6 January 1929 in Bratislava – 2002) was a Slovak ice hockey player who competed for Czechoslovakia in the 1952 Winter Olympics.
