= Miroslav Rejman =

Czech ice hockey player

Miroslav Rejman (17 October 1925 in Chrudim, Czechoslovakia – 31 January 2008 in Prague) was a Czech ice hockey player who competed in the 1952 Winter Olympics.
