= Jan Lidral =

Czech ice hockey player

Jan Lidral (19 March 1929 in Hluboká nad Vltavou, Czechoslovakia – 24 January 1982 in České Budějovice, Czechoslovakia) was a Czech ice hockey player who competed in the 1952 Winter Olympics.
