= Jan Richter =

Czech ice hockey player (1923–1999)

- Born: 29 March 1923 Tišnov, Czechoslovakia
- Died: 25 July 1999 (aged 76) Tišnov, Czech Republic
- Position: Goaltender
- National team: Czechoslovakia
- Playing career: 1952–1954

Jan Richter (29 March 1923 – 25 July 1999) was a Czech ice hockey player who competed for Czechoslovakia in the 1952 Winter Olympics.
