= Jiří Sekyra =

Czech ice hockey player

Jiří Sekyra (21 April 1929 in Prague – 18 October 1977 in Prague) was a Czech ice hockey player who competed in the 1952 Winter Olympics.
