= Václav Bubník =

Czech ice hockey player

Václav Bubník (1 January 1926 in Prague – 27 March 1990) was a Czech ice hockey player who competed for Czechoslovakia in the 1952 Winter Olympics and in the 1956 Winter Olympics.
