= Bronislav Danda =

Czech ice hockey player

- Born: January 10, 1930; Hradec Králové, Czechoslovakia
- Died: December 31, 2015 (aged 85); Brno, Czech Republic
- Height: 5 ft 7 in (170 cm)
- Weight: 165 lb (75 kg; 11 st 11 lb)
- Position: Left wing
- Shot: Left
- National team: Czechoslovakia
- Playing career: 1944–1969

Bronislav Danda (10 January 1930 – 31 December 2015) was a Czech ice hockey player who competed in the 1952 Winter Olympics, in the 1956 Winter Olympics, and in the 1960 Winter Olympics. He was born in Hradec Králové, Czechoslovakia.
