= Slavomír Bartoň =

Czech ice hockey player

Slavomír Bartoň (22 January 1926 in Lipůvka – 16 January 2004 in Brno) was a Czech ice hockey player who competed in the 1952 Winter Olympics and in the 1956 Winter Olympics.
