= Ice hockey at the 1956 Winter Olympics – Rosters =

The ice hockey team rosters at the 1956 Winter Olympics consisted of the following players:

== Austria ==
Head coach: Udo Holfeld

Pos.	Name	Height	Weight	Birthdate	Team
F	Adolf Hafner	-	-	January 5, 1926 (aged 30)	N/A
F	Wolfgang Jöchl	-	-	May 10, 1930 (aged 25)	N/A
D	Hermann Knoll	6 ft 3 in (191 cm)	-	December 10, 1931 (aged 24)	(Austria) EK Engelmann Wien
F	Kurt Kurz	-	-	September 30, 1927 (aged 28)	N/A
D	Hans Mössmer	-	-	March 22, 1932 (aged 23)	N/A
G	Robert Nusser	-	-	April 15, 1911 (aged 44)	N/A
D	Franz Potucek	-	-	May 28, 1927 (aged 28)	N/A
G	Alfred Püls	5 ft 10 in (178 cm)	168 lb (76 kg)	August 12, 1933 (aged 22)	N/A
D	Hans Scarsini	-	-	October 3, 1924 (aged 31)	N/A
F	Wilhelm Schmid	-	-	March 30, 1921 (aged 34)	N/A
F	Max Singewald	-	-	February 4, 1933 (aged 22)	N/A
F	Fritz Spielmann	-	-	March 26, 1933 (aged 22)	N/A
F	Gerhard Springer	-	-	February 6, 1927 (aged 28)	N/A
F	Conny Staudinger	-	-	July 15, 1927 (aged 28)	N/A
F	Hans Wagner	-	-	January 22, 1923 (aged 33)	N/A
F	Walter Znenahlik	-	-	January 2, 1935 (aged 21)	N/A
D	Hans Zollner	5 ft 6 in (168 cm)	176 lb (80 kg)	November 14, 1929 (aged 26)	N/A

== Canada ==
Head coach: Bobby Bauer

No.	Pos.	Name	Height	Weight	Birthdate	Team
1	G	Denis Brodeur	5 ft 6 in (168 cm)	154 lb (70 kg)	October 12, 1930 (aged 25)	(Canada) Kitchener-Waterloo Dutchmen
1	G	Keith Woodall	-	-	August 4, 1926 (aged 29)	(Canada) Kitchener-Waterloo Dutchmen
2	D	Byrle Klinck	6 ft 0 in (183 cm)	209 lb (95 kg)	June 20, 1934 (aged 21)	(Canada) Kitchener-Waterloo Dutchmen
3	F	Floyd Martin	5 ft 10 in (178 cm)	209 lb (95 kg)	June 26, 1929 (aged 26)	(Canada) Kitchener-Waterloo Dutchmen
4	D	Howie Lee	5 ft 9 in (175 cm)	176 lb (80 kg)	October 13, 1929 (aged 26)	(Canada) Kitchener-Waterloo Dutchmen
5	D	Art Hurst	5 ft 10 in (178 cm)	174 lb (79 kg)	May 2, 1923 (aged 32)	(Canada) Kitchener-Waterloo Dutchmen
8	F	Gerry Théberge	5 ft 9 in (175 cm)	159 lb (72 kg)	December 18, 1930 (aged 25)	(Canada) Kitchener-Waterloo Dutchmen
9	F	Paul Knox	5 ft 9 in (175 cm)	154 lb (70 kg)	November 23, 1933 (aged 22)	(Canada) Kitchener-Waterloo Dutchmen
10	F	Bill Colvin	5 ft 10 in (178 cm)	165 lb (75 kg)	December 3, 1934 (aged 21)	(Canada) Kitchener-Waterloo Dutchmen
12	F	Jack McKenzie (C)	6 ft 3 in (191 cm)	190 lb (86 kg)	July 30, 1922 (aged 33)	(Canada) Kitchener-Waterloo Dutchmen
14	D	Donald Rope	5 ft 10 in (178 cm)	154 lb (70 kg)	February 2, 1929 (aged 26)	(Canada) Kitchener-Waterloo Dutchmen
15	F	George Scholes	6 ft 0 in (183 cm)	170 lb (77 kg)	November 24, 1928 (aged 27)	(Canada) Kitchener-Waterloo Dutchmen
16	F	Buddy Horne	5 ft 9 in (175 cm)	174 lb (79 kg)	October 4, 1933 (aged 22)	(Canada) Kitchener-Waterloo Dutchmen
17	F	Ken Laufman	5 ft 9 in (175 cm)	159 lb (72 kg)	January 30, 1932 (aged 23)	(Canada) Kitchener-Waterloo Dutchmen
18	F	Charlie Brooker	6 ft 1 in (185 cm)	183 lb (83 kg)	February 23, 1932 (aged 23)	(Canada) Kitchener-Waterloo Dutchmen
19	F	Bob White	6 ft 1 in (185 cm)	183 lb (83 kg)	July 22, 1935 (aged 20)	(Canada) Kitchener-Waterloo Dutchmen

== Czechoslovakia ==
Head coach: Vladimír Bouzek

No.	Pos.	Name	Height	Weight	Birthdate	Team
1	G	Jan Vodička	-	-	April 13, 1932 (aged 23)	(Czechoslovakia) Tankista Praha
2	D	Karel Gut (C)	-	-	September 16, 1927 (aged 28)	(Czechoslovakia) TJ Spartak Praha Sokolovo
3	D	Václav Bubník	-	-	January 1, 1926 (aged 30)	(Czechoslovakia) Baník VŽKG
4	D	Jan Kasper	5 ft 10 in (178 cm)	176 lb (80 kg)	September 21, 1932 (aged 23)	(Czechoslovakia) TJ Rudá Hvězda Brno
5	F	Slavomír Bartoň	6 ft 0 in (183 cm)	181 lb (82 kg)	January 12, 1926 (aged 30)	(Czechoslovakia) TJ Rudá Hvězda Brno
6	F	Bronislav Danda	5 ft 8 in (173 cm)	165 lb (75 kg)	January 10, 1930 (aged 26)	(Czechoslovakia) TJ Rudá Hvězda Brno
7	F	Zdeněk Návrat	5 ft 7 in (170 cm)	159 lb (72 kg)	May 25, 1931 (aged 24)	(Czechoslovakia) TJ Rudá Hvězda Brno
8	F	Bohumil Prošek	5 ft 8 in (173 cm)	161 lb (73 kg)	March 26, 1931 (aged 24)	(Czechoslovakia) TJ Rudá Hvězda Brno
9	F	František Vaněk	5 ft 9 in (175 cm)	154 lb (70 kg)	December 3, 1931 (aged 24)	(Czechoslovakia) TJ Rudá Hvězda Brno
10	D	Stanislav Bacílek	-	-	November 13, 1929 (aged 26)	(Czechoslovakia) DSO Baník Kladno
11	F	Václav Pantůček	5 ft 10 in (178 cm)	168 lb (76 kg)	November 24, 1934 (aged 21)	(Czechoslovakia) TJ Spartak Praha Sokolovo
12	F	Vlastimil Bubník	5 ft 9 in (175 cm)	154 lb (70 kg)	March 18, 1931 (aged 24)	(Czechoslovakia) TJ Rudá Hvězda Brno
13	D	Jaromír Bünter	-	-	April 3, 1930 (aged 25)	(Czechoslovakia) Tankista Praha
14	F	Miroslav Klůc	-	-	December 1, 1922 (aged 33)	(Czechoslovakia) TJ Banik Chomutov ZJF
15	F	Vladimír Zábrodský	-	-	March 7, 1923 (aged 32)	(Czechoslovakia) TJ Spartak Praha Sokolovo
16	F	Otto Cimrman	-	-	May 1, 1925 (aged 30)	(Czechoslovakia) TJ Banik Chomutov ZJF
17	G	Ján Jendek	-	-	July 5, 1931 (aged 24)	(Czechoslovakia) HC Slovan Bratislava

== Germany ==
Head coach: (Canada) Frank Trottier

No.	Pos.	Name	Height	Weight	Birthdate	Team
1	G	Alfred Hoffmann	-	-	December 20, 1914 (aged 41)	(West Germany) SC Riessersee
1	G	Ulli Jansen	5 ft 7 in (170 cm)	168 lb (76 kg)	June 5, 1931 (aged 24)	(West Germany) Krefelder EV 1936
2	D	Toni Biersack	-	-	July 14, 1927 (aged 28)	(West Germany) SC Riessersee
3	F/D	Bruno Guttowski	-	-	November 8, 1924 (aged 31)	(West Germany) Mannheimer ERC
4	D	Martin Beck	-	-	October 25, 1933 (aged 22)	(West Germany) EV Füssen
5	D	Paul Ambros	5 ft 9 in (175 cm)	168 lb (76 kg)	June 22, 1933 (aged 22)	(West Germany) EV Füssen
6	F	Kurt Sepp	-	-	September 14, 1935 (aged 20)	(West Germany) EV Füssen
7	F	Markus Egen (C)	-	-	September 14, 1927 (aged 28)	(West Germany) EV Füssen
8	F	Ernst Trautwein	-	-	April 8, 1936 (aged 19)	(West Germany) EV Füssen
9	F	Rudolf Pittrich	-	-	June 19, 1935 (aged 20)	(West Germany) SC Riessersee
10	F/D	Hans Huber	-	-	December 10, 1929 (aged 26)	(West Germany) SC Riessersee
11	F	Arthur Endreß	-	-	February 6, 1932 (aged 23)	(West Germany) SC Riessersee
12	F	Reiner Kossmann	-	-	May 1, 1927 (aged 28)	(West Germany) KTSV Preussen Krefeld
14	F	Hans Rampf	-	-	February 2, 1931 (aged 24)	(West Germany) EC Bad Tölz
15	F	Martin Zach	-	-	January 4, 1933 (aged 23)	(West Germany) EC Bad Tölz
16	D	Karl Bierschel	-	-	March 1, 1932 (aged 23)	(West Germany) Krefelder EV 1936
17	F/D	Günter Jochems	-	-	November 5, 1928 (aged 27)	(West Germany) Krefelder EV 1936

== Italy ==
Head coach: (Switzerland) Bibi Torriani

Pos.	Name	Birthdate	Team
F	Giancarlo Agazzi	August 22, 1932 (aged 23)	N/A
D	Reno Alberton	March 30, 1936 (aged 19)	N/A
D	Mario Bedogni (C)	November 22, 1923 (aged 32)	N/A
G	Vittorio Bolla	January 12, 1931 (aged 25)	N/A
F	Giampiero Branduardi	August 28, 1936 (aged 19)	N/A
F	Ernesto Crotti	July 18, 1936 (aged 19)	N/A
D	Gianfranco Da Rin	June 15, 1935 (aged 20)	N/A
F/D	Aldo Federici	September 6, 1920 (aged 35)	N/A
G	Giuliano Ferraris	February 16, 1935 (aged 20)	N/A
F	Giovanni Furlani	September 4, 1936 (aged 19)	N/A
F	Francesco Macchietto	July 31, 1932 (aged 23)	N/A
F	Aldo Maniacco	November 4, 1934 (aged 21)	N/A
D	Carlo Montemurro	April 18, 1934 (aged 21)	N/A
F	Giulio Oberhammer	December 14, 1935 (aged 20)	N/A
F	Bernardo Tomei	September 10, 1933 (aged 22)	N/A
F/D	Carmine Tucci	December 27, 1933 (aged 22)	N/A

== Poland ==
Coaches: Mieczysław Palus, Władysław Wiro-Kiro

Pos.	Name	Height	Weight	Birthdate	Team
D	Henryk Bromowicz	-	-	February 22, 1924 (aged 31)	(Poland) CWKS Warszawa
F	Kazimierz Bryniarski	5 ft 9 in (175 cm)	154 lb (70 kg)	October 11, 1934 (aged 21)	(Poland) Podhale Nowy Targ
D	Mieczysław Chmura	5 ft 8 in (173 cm)	161 lb (73 kg)	January 1, 1934 (aged 22)	(Poland) Podhale Nowy Targ
D	Kazimierz Chodakowski	-	-	June 20, 1929 (aged 26)	(Poland) CWKS Warszawa
F	Rudolf Czech	-	-	September 15, 1930 (aged 25)	(Poland) CWKS Warszawa
F	Bronisław Gosztyła	5 ft 5 in (165 cm)	154 lb (70 kg)	October 11, 1935 (aged 20)	(Poland) CWKS Warszawa
F/D	Marian Herda	-	-	October 1, 1933 (aged 22)	(Poland) Gwardia Katowice
F/D	Szymon Janiczko	-	-	January 9, 1930 (aged 26)	(Poland) CWKS Warszawa
G	Edward Kocząb	5 ft 7 in (170 cm)	141 lb (64 kg)	August 2, 1928 (aged 27)	(Poland) CWKS Warszawa
F	Józef Kurek (C)	6 ft 0 in (183 cm)	163 lb (74 kg)	January 2, 1933 (aged 23)	(Poland) CWKS Warszawa
F	Zdzisław Nowak (C)	5 ft 8 in (173 cm)	159 lb (72 kg)	February 25, 1928 (aged 27)	(Poland) KTH Krynica
D	Stanisław Olczyk	5 ft 7 in (170 cm)	152 lb (69 kg)	October 15, 1932 (aged 23)	(Poland) CWKS Warszawa
G	Władysław Pabisz	5 ft 7 in (170 cm)	148 lb (67 kg)	January 5, 1931 (aged 25)	(Poland) KTH Krynica
F	Hilary Skarżyński	-	-	June 18, 1925 (aged 30)	(Poland) Gornick 1920 Katowice
F	Adolf Wróbel	-	-	October 19, 1932 (aged 23)	(Poland) CWKS Warszawa
F	Alfred Wróbel	-	-	November 29, 1927 (aged 28)	(Poland) Gornick 1920 Katowice
D/F	Janusz Zawadzki	-	-	April 27, 1931 (aged 24)	(Poland) Gornick 1920 Katowice

== Soviet Union ==
Head coach: Arkady Chernyshev

Assistant coach: Vladimir Yegorov

No.	Pos.	Name	Height	Weight	Birthdate	Team
1	G	Nikolai Puchkov	5 ft 10 in (178 cm)	181 lb (82 kg)	January 30, 1930 (aged 25)	(Soviet Union) CSK MO Moskva
2	D	Alfred Kuchevsky	5 ft 11 in (180 cm)	174 lb (79 kg)	May 7, 1931 (aged 24)	(Soviet Union) Krylia Sovetov Moskva
3	D	Nikolai Sologubov	5 ft 10 in (178 cm)	176 lb (80 kg)	August 8, 1924 (aged 31)	(Soviet Union) CSK MO Moskva
4	D	Ivan Tregubov	6 ft 1 in (185 cm)	183 lb (83 kg)	January 19, 1930 (aged 26)	(Soviet Union) CSK MO Moskva
5	D	Dmitri Ukolov	5 ft 9 in (175 cm)	190 lb (86 kg)	October 23, 1929 (aged 26)	(Soviet Union) CSK MO Moskva
6	D	Genrikh Sidorenkov	5 ft 10 in (178 cm)	185 lb (84 kg)	August 11, 1931 (aged 24)	(Soviet Union) CSK MO Moskva
7	F	Yevgeni Babich	5 ft 7 in (170 cm)	161 lb (73 kg)	January 7, 1921 (aged 35)	(Soviet Union) CSK MO Moskva
8	F	Viktor Shuvalov	6 ft 0 in (183 cm)	190 lb (86 kg)	December 15, 1923 (aged 32)	(Soviet Union) CSK MO Moskva
9	F	Vsevolod Bobrov (C)	5 ft 11 in (180 cm)	172 lb (78 kg)	December 1, 1922 (aged 33)	(Soviet Union) CSK MO Moskva
10	F	Valentin Kuzin	5 ft 9 in (175 cm)	174 lb (79 kg)	September 23, 1926 (aged 29)	(Soviet Union) Dynamo Moskva
11	F	Alexander Uvarov	5 ft 7 in (170 cm)	161 lb (73 kg)	March 20, 1922 (aged 33)	(Soviet Union) Dynamo Moskva
12	F	Nikolai Khlystov	5 ft 6 in (168 cm)	143 lb (65 kg)	November 10, 1932 (aged 23)	(Soviet Union) Krylia Sovetov Moskva
13	F	Yuri Pantyukhov	5 ft 9 in (175 cm)	165 lb (75 kg)	March 15, 1931 (aged 24)	(Soviet Union) CSK MO Moskva
14	F	Alexei Guryshev	5 ft 11 in (180 cm)	181 lb (82 kg)	March 14, 1925 (aged 30)	(Soviet Union) Krylia Sovetov Moskva
15	F	Yuri Krylov	-	-	March 11, 1930 (aged 25)	(Soviet Union) Dynamo Moskva
16	F	Viktor Nikiforov	6 ft 1 in (185 cm)	187 lb (85 kg)	December 4, 1931 (aged 24)	(Soviet Union) Dynamo Moskva
17	G	Grigori Mkrtychan	-	-	January 3, 1925 (aged 31)	(Soviet Union) CSK MO Moskva

== Sweden ==
Head coach: Folke Jansson

No.	Pos.	Name	Height	Weight	Birthdate	Team
1	G	Lars Svensson	-	-	June 30, 1926 (aged 29)	(Sweden) Hammarby IF
2	D	Bertz Zetterberg	-	-	November 23, 1930 (aged 25)	N/A
3	D	Lasse Björn (C)	6 ft 4 in (193 cm)	227 lb (103 kg)	December 16, 1931 (aged 24)	(Sweden) Djurgårdens IF
4	D	Åke Lassas	-	-	August 21, 1924 (aged 31)	(Sweden) Leksands IF
5	D	Vilgot Larsson	-	-	May 3, 1932 (aged 23)	(Sweden) Leksands IF
6	D	Holger Nurmela (C)	-	-	October 28, 1920 (aged 35)	(Sweden) Hammarby IF
7	F	Sven Tumba	6 ft 2 in (188 cm)	190 lb (86 kg)	August 27, 1931 (aged 24)	(Sweden) Djurgårdens IF
8	F	Sigurd Bröms	-	-	January 10, 1932 (aged 24)	(Sweden) Leksands IF
9	F	Hans Öberg	-	-	November 21, 1926 (aged 29)	(Sweden) Gävle GIK
10	F/D	Ronald Pettersson	6 ft 0 in (183 cm)	181 lb (82 kg)	April 16, 1935 (aged 20)	(Sweden) Södertälje SK
11	F	Nils Nilsson	-	-	March 8, 1936 (aged 19)	(Sweden) IK Göta
12	F	Lars-Eric Lundvall	5 ft 11 in (180 cm)	172 lb (78 kg)	April 3, 1934 (aged 21)	(Sweden) Södertälje SK
13	F	Stig Andersson-Tvilling	-	-	July 15, 1928 (aged 27)	(Sweden) Djurgårdens IF
14	F	Hans Andersson-Tvilling	-	-	July 15, 1928 (aged 27)	(Sweden) Djurgårdens IF
15	F	Stig Carlsson	-	-	January 17, 1924 (aged 32)	(Sweden) Södertälje SK
16	D	Ove Malmberg	-	-	May 17, 1933 (aged 22)	(Sweden) IK Göta
17	G	Yngve Casslind	-	-	June 28, 1932 (aged 23)	(Sweden) IK Göta

== Switzerland ==
Head coach: Heinrich Boller

Pos.	Name	Height	Weight	Birthdate	Team
F	Bernhard Bagnoud	-	-	February 10, 1932 (aged 23)	(Switzerland) HC La Chaux-de-Fonds
F	Franz Berry	5 ft 11 in (180 cm)	172 lb (78 kg)	November 21, 1938 (aged 17)	(Switzerland) HC Davos
G	Christian Conrad	-	-	November 17, 1931 (aged 24)	(Switzerland) HC La Chaux-de-Fonds
F	Rätus Frei	-	-	September 8, 1932 (aged 23)	(Switzerland) Zürcher SC
D	Émile Golaz	-	-	September 21, 1927 (aged 28)	(Switzerland) HC Neuchâtel Young Sprinters
D	Emil Handschin (C)	-	-	March 19, 1928 (aged 27)	(Switzerland) EHC Basel
D	Paul Hofer	6 ft 0 in (183 cm)	194 lb (88 kg)	November 19, 1928 (aged 27)	(Switzerland) EHC Basel
D	Rudolf Keller	-	-	October 6, 1925 (aged 30)	(Switzerland) Grasshopper Club Zürich
F	Walter Keller	-	-	October 26, 1933 (aged 22)	(Switzerland) HC Davos
F	Fritz Naef	-	-	June 5, 1934 (aged 21)	(Switzerland) Lausanne HC
F	Hans Ott	-	-	February 28, 1930 (aged 25)	(Switzerland) SC Bern
F/D	Hans Pappa	-	-	July 26, 1936 (aged 19)	(Switzerland) HC Davos
D	Kurt Peter	-	-	May 29, 1934 (aged 21)	N/A
D	Georg Riesch	-	-	February 26, 1933 (aged 22)	(Switzerland) Zürcher SC
G	Martin Riesen	-	-	July 8, 1926 (aged 29)	(Switzerland) HC Davos
F	Otto Schläpfer	-	-	March 11, 1931 (aged 24)	(Switzerland) Zürcher SC
D	Sepp Weingärtner	-	-	April 19, 1932 (aged 23)	(Switzerland) HC Davos

== United States ==
Head coach: John Mariucci

No.	Pos.	Name	Height	Weight	Birthdate	Team
1	G	Willard Ikola	5 ft 7 in (170 cm)	146 lb (66 kg)	July 28, 1932 (aged 23)	N/A
1	G	Don Rigazio	-	-	July 3, 1934 (aged 21)	N/A
2	F	Dan McKinnon	6 ft 1 in (185 cm)	209 lb (95 kg)	April 21, 1922 (aged 33)	N/A
3	D	Ed Sampson	5 ft 11 in (180 cm)	170 lb (77 kg)	December 23, 1921 (aged 34)	N/A
4	F	John Matchefts	5 ft 7 in (170 cm)	150 lb (68 kg)	June 18, 1931 (aged 24)	N/A
5	F	Dick Meredith	5 ft 7 in (170 cm)	150 lb (68 kg)	December 22, 1932 (aged 23)	N/A
6	F	Dick Dougherty	5 ft 9 in (175 cm)	185 lb (84 kg)	August 5, 1932 (aged 23)	N/A
7	F	Ken Purpur	5 ft 7 in (170 cm)	141 lb (64 kg)	March 1, 1932 (aged 23)	N/A
8	F/D	John Mayasich	6 ft 1 in (185 cm)	216 lb (98 kg)	May 22, 1933 (aged 22)	N/A
9	F	Bill Cleary	5 ft 10 in (178 cm)	174 lb (79 kg)	August 19, 1934 (aged 21)	N/A
10	F	Wellington Burtnett	6 ft 0 in (183 cm)	187 lb (85 kg)	August 26, 1930 (aged 25)	N/A
11	D	Wendell Anderson	6 ft 0 in (183 cm)	170 lb (77 kg)	February 1, 1933 (aged 22)	N/A
12	F	Gene Campbell (C)	-	-	August 17, 1932 (aged 23)	N/A
14	F	Weldon Olson	5 ft 10 in (178 cm)	161 lb (73 kg)	November 12, 1932 (aged 23)	N/A
15	D	John Petroske	6 ft 0 in (183 cm)	185 lb (84 kg)	August 6, 1934 (aged 21)	(United States) Minnesota Golden Gophers
17	F	Dick Rodenhiser	-	-	October 17, 1932 (aged 23)	N/A
18	F	Gordy Christian	5 ft 9 in (175 cm)	165 lb (75 kg)	November 21, 1927 (aged 28)	N/A

== Sources ==
- Duplacey, James (1998). Total Hockey: The official encyclopedia of the National Hockey League. Total Sports. ISBN 0-8362-7114-9.
- Podnieks, Andrew (2010). IIHF Media Guide & Record Book 2011. Moydart Pres.
- Hockey Hall Of Fame page on the 1956 Olympics
- Wallechinsky, David (1988). The Complete Book of the Olympics. Penguin Books. pp. 614. ISBN 0-14-010771-1.
