= Austria at the 1956 Winter Olympics =

- IOC code: AUT
- NOC: Austrian Olympic Committee
- Website: www.olympia.at (in German)

in Cortina d'Ampezzo, Italy 26 January–5 February 1956
- Competitors: 60 (50 men, 10 women) in 8 sports
- Flag bearer: Toni Sailer (alpine skiing)
- Medals Ranked 2nd: Gold 4 Silver 3 Bronze 4 Total 11

Winter Olympics appearances (overview)
- 1924; 1928; 1932; 1936; 1948; 1952; 1956; 1960; 1964; 1968; 1972; 1976; 1980; 1984; 1988; 1992; 1994; 1998; 2002; 2006; 2010; 2014; 2018; 2022; 2026

Austria competed at the 1956 Winter Olympics in Cortina d'Ampezzo, Italy.

== Medalists ==
| Medal | Name | Sport | Event |
|---|---|---|---|
| Gold | Toni Sailer | Alpine skiing | Men's downhill |
| Gold | Toni Sailer | Alpine skiing | Men's giant slalom |
| Gold | Toni Sailer | Alpine skiing | Men's slalom |
| Gold | Sissy Schwarz; Kurt Oppelt | Figure skating | Pairs |
| Silver | Anderl Molterer | Alpine skiing | Men's giant slalom |
| Silver | Putzi Frandl | Alpine skiing | Women's giant slalom |
| Silver | Regina Schöpf | Alpine skiing | Women's slalom |
| Bronze | Anderl Molterer | Alpine skiing | Men's downhill |
| Bronze | Walter Schuster | Alpine skiing | Men's giant slalom |
| Bronze | Thea Hochleitner | Alpine skiing | Women's giant slalom |
| Bronze | Ingrid Wendl | Figure skating | Women's singles |

== Alpine skiing ==
Men

| Athlete | Event | Race 1 | | Race 2 | | Total | |
| Athlete | Event | Time | Rank | Time | Rank | Time | Rank |
|---|---|---|---|---|---|---|---|
| Walter Schuster | Downhill | | | | | DSQ | – |
| Josl Rieder | Downhill | | | | | DSQ | – |
| Anderl Molterer | Downhill | | | | | 2:56.2 | 3rd place, bronze medalist(s) |
| Toni Sailer | Downhill | | | | | 2:52.2 | 1st place, gold medalist(s) |
| Ernst Hinterseer | Giant Slalom | | | | | 3:08.5 | 6 |
| Walter Schuster | Giant Slalom | | | | | 3:07.2 | 3rd place, bronze medalist(s) |
| Anderl Molterer | Giant Slalom | | | | | 3:06.3 | 2nd place, silver medalist(s) |
| Toni Sailer | Giant Slalom | | | | | 3:00.1 | 1st place, gold medalist(s) |
| Anderl Molterer | Slalom | DSQ | – | – | – | DSQ | – |
| Josl Rieder | Slalom | 1:47.0 | 31 | DSQ | – | DSQ | – |
| Othmar Schneider | Slalom | 1:35.8 | 23 | 2:00.0 | 13 | 3:35.8 | 12 |
| Toni Sailer | Slalom | 1:27.3 | 1 | 1:47.4 | 1 | 3:14.7 | 1st place, gold medalist(s) |

Women

| Athlete | Event | Race 1 | | Race 2 | | Total | |
| Athlete | Event | Time | Rank | Time | Rank | Time | Rank |
|---|---|---|---|---|---|---|---|
| Putzi Frandl | Downhill | | | | | 1:51.0 | 13 |
| Trude Klecker | Downhill | | | | | 1:50.6 | 12 |
| Thea Hochleitner | Downhill | | | | | 1:47.9 | 7 |
| Hilde Hofherr | Downhill | | | | | 1:47.3 | 4 |
| Trude Klecker | Giant Slalom | | | | | 2:08.5 | 33 |
| Regina Schöpf | Giant Slalom | | | | | 2:00.6 | 9 |
| Thea Hochleitner | Giant Slalom | | | | | 1:58.2 | 3rd place, bronze medalist(s) |
| Putzi Frandl | Giant Slalom | | | | | 1:57.8 | 2nd place, silver medalist(s) |
| Putzi Frandl | Slalom | 1:00.4 | 14 | 57.5 | 2 | 1:58.0 | 5 |
| Thea Hochleitner | Slalom | 1:00.4 | 14 | 1:00.6 | 13 | 2:01.0 | 12 |
| Hilde Hofherr | Slalom | 58.2 | 6 | 1:25.3 | 31 | 2:23.5 | 24 |
| Regina Schöpf | Slalom | 56.0 | 2 | 59.4 | 7 | 1:55.4 | 2nd place, silver medalist(s) |

== Bobsleigh ==
| Sled | Athletes | Event | Run 1 | | Run 2 | | Run 3 | | Run 4 | | Total | |
| Sled | Athletes | Event | Time | Rank | Time | Rank | Time | Rank | Time | Rank | Time | Rank |
|---|---|---|---|---|---|---|---|---|---|---|---|---|
| AUT-1 | Paul Aste; Heinrich Isser | Two-man | 1:26.32 | 12 | 1:25.82 | 12 | 1:26.61 | 15 | 1:25.22 | 7 | 5:43.97 | 12 |
| AUT-2 | Karl Wagner; Adolf Tonn | Two-man | 1:26.15 | 11 | 1:27.06 | 20 | 1:26.73 | 16 | 1:26.35 | 14 | 5:46.29 | 15 |

| Sled | Athletes | Event | Run 1 | | Run 2 | | Run 3 | | Run 4 | | Total | |
| Sled | Athletes | Event | Time | Rank | Time | Rank | Time | Rank | Time | Rank | Time | Rank |
|---|---|---|---|---|---|---|---|---|---|---|---|---|
| AUT-1 | Karl Wagner; Fritz Rursch; Adolf Tonn; Heinrich Isser | Four-man | 1:19.60 | 11 | 1:20.74 | 17 | 1:19.98 | 8 | 1:20.30 | 8 | 5:20.62 | 10 |
| AUT-2 | Kurt Loserth; Wilfried Thurner; Karl Schwarzböck; Franz Dominik | Four-man | 1:19.37 | 10 | 1:19.12 | 9 | 1:20.08 | 9 | 1:19.72 | 5 | 5:18.29 | 7 |

== Cross-country skiing ==
Men

| Event | Athlete | Race | |
| Event | Athlete | Time | Rank |
|---|---|---|---|
| 15 km | Oskar Schulz | 59:56 | 59 |
| 15 km | Hermann Mayr | 55:51 | 39 |
| 15 km | Karl Rafreider | 54:51 | 35 |
| 15 km | Sepp Schneeberger | 54:21 | 28 |

Men's 4 × 10 km relay

| Athletes | Race | |
| Athletes | Time | Rank |
|---|---|---|
| Sepp Schneeberger; Oskar Schulz; Hermann Mayr; Karl Rafreider | 2'30:50 | 11 |

== Figure skating ==
Men

| Athlete | CF | FS | Points | Places | Rank |
|---|---|---|---|---|---|
| Norbert Felsinger | 7 | 8 | 150.55 | 67 | 7 |

Women

| Athlete | CF | FS | Points | Places | Rank |
|---|---|---|---|---|---|
| Hanna Walter | 8 | 7 | 153.89 | 83.5 | 7 |
| Hanna Eigel | 5 | 4 | 157.15 | 52 | 5 |
| Ingrid Wendl | 3 | 5 | 159.44 | 39 | 3rd place, bronze medalist(s) |

Pairs

| Athletes | Points | Places | Rank |
|---|---|---|---|
| Elisabeth Ellend; Konrad Lienert | 10.38 | 77 | 9 |
| Sissy Schwarz; Kurt Oppelt | 11.31 | 14 | 1st place, gold medalist(s) |

== Ice hockey ==
=== Group A ===
Top two teams advanced to Medal Round.

| Rank | Team | Pld | W | L | T | GF | GA | Pts |
|---|---|---|---|---|---|---|---|---|
| 1 | Canada | 3 | 3 | 0 | 0 | 30 | 1 | 6 |
| 2 | Germany | 3 | 1 | 1 | 1 | 9 | 6 | 3 |
| 3 | Italy | 3 | 0 | 1 | 2 | 5 | 7 | 2 |
| 4 | Austria | 3 | 0 | 2 | 1 | 2 | 32 | 1 |

- Italy 2-2 Austria
- Canada 23-0 Austria
- Germany (UTG) 7-0 Austria

=== Games for 7th-10th places ===
| Rank | Team | Pld | W | L | T | GF | GA | Pts |
|---|---|---|---|---|---|---|---|---|
| 7 | Italy | 3 | 3 | 0 | 0 | 21 | 7 | 6 |
| 8 | Poland | 3 | 2 | 1 | 0 | 12 | 10 | 4 |
| 9 | Switzerland | 3 | 1 | 2 | 0 | 12 | 18 | 2 |
| 10 | Austria | 3 | 0 | 3 | 0 | 9 | 19 | 0 |

- Switzerland 7-4 Austria
- Italy 8-2 Austria
- Poland 4-3 Austria

| Contestants; Alfred Püls; Robert Nusser; Franz Potucek; Hermann Knoll; Hans Mössmer; Hans Scarsini; Hans Zollner; Fritz Spielmann; Wilhelm Schmid; Walter Znenahlik; Gerhard Springer; Adolf Hafner; Hans Wagner; Max Singewald; Kurt Kurz; Konrad Staudinger; Wolfgang Jöchl |

== Nordic combined ==
Events:

- normal hill ski jumping (Three jumps, best two counted and shown here.)
- 15 km cross-country skiing

| Athlete | Event | Ski Jumping | | | | Cross-country | | | Total | |
| Athlete | Event | Distance 1 | Distance 2 | Points | Rank | Time | Points | Rank | Points | Rank |
|---|---|---|---|---|---|---|---|---|---|---|
| Leopold Kohl | Individual | 66.5 | 69.5 | 198.5 | 16 | 1'01:00 | 221.800 | 21 | 420.300 | 17 |
| Sepp Schiffner | Individual | 71.5 | 73.5 | 211.5 | 4 | 1'02:02 | 217.800 | 25 | 429.300 | 11 |
| Willi Egger | Individual | 73.0 | 72.5 | 208.0 | 7 | 1'03:00 | 214.100 | 28 | 422.100 | 16 |

== Ski jumping ==
| Athlete | Event | Jump 1 | | | Jump 2 | | | Total | |
| Athlete | Event | Distance | Points | Rank | Distance | Points | Rank | Points | Rank |
|---|---|---|---|---|---|---|---|---|---|
| Otto Leodolter | Normal hill | 72.0 | 94.0 | 31 | 72.5 | 91.0 | 33 | 185.0 | 30 |
| Rudolf Schweinberger | Normal hill | 74.5 | 100.0 | 22 | 75.0 | 99.0 | 17 | 199.0 | 19 |
| Walter Habersatter | Normal hill | 77.5 | 102.0 | 18 | 77.5 | 99.5 | 16 | 201.5 | 15 |
| Sepp Bradl | Normal hill | 77.5 | 104.5 | 11 | 77.0 | 101.0 | 15 | 205.5 | 12 |

== Speed skating ==
Men

| Event | Athlete | Race | |
| Event | Athlete | Time | Rank |
|---|---|---|---|
| 500 m | Kurt Eminger | 44.4 | 41 |
| 500 m | Ernst Biel | 44.2 | 37 |
| 500 m | Franz Offenberger | 43.8 | 32 |
| 1500 m | Ernst Biel | 2:23.5 | 51 |
| 1500 m | Kurt Eminger | 2:19.0 | 38 |
| 1500 m | Arthur Mannsbarth | 2:17.4 | 32 |
| 1500 m | Franz Offenberger | 2:17.3 | 31 |
| 5000 m | Kurt Eminger | 8:39.4 | 38 |
| 5000 m | Franz Offenberger | 8:30.8 | 34 |
| 5000 m | Arthur Mannsbarth | 8:23.6 | 28 |
| 10,000 m | Arthur Mannsbarth | 17:47.8 | 29 |
