= Józef Manowski =

Polish ice hockey player

- Born: January 7, 1935 (age 91) Nowe Lubiejewo, Poland
- Height: 5 ft 7 in (170 cm)
- Weight: 172 lb (78 kg; 12 st 4 lb)
- Position: Right wing
- Played for: AZS Warszawa; Legia Warsaw
- National team: Poland
- Playing career: 1954–1972

Józef Manowski (born 7 January 1935) is a Polish former ice hockey player. He played for AZS Warszawa and Legia Warsaw during his career. With Legia, he won the Polish league championship five times and was the league's top goal scorer in 1963, 1964, and 1966. He also played for the Polish national team at the 1964 Winter Olympics and four World Championship.
