= Stanisław Fryźlewicz =

Polish ice hockey player

- Born: 8 April 1944 (age 81); Nowy Targ, General Government
- Height: 5 ft 9 in (175 cm)
- Weight: 174 lb (79 kg; 12 st 6 lb)
- Position: Forward
- Played for: Podhale Nowy Targ; Legia Warsaw; ŁKS Łódź
- National team: Poland
- Playing career: 1964–1981

Stanisław Fryźlewicz (born 8 April 1944) is a Polish former ice hockey player. During his career, he played for Podhale Nowy Targ, Legia Warsaw, and ŁKS Łódź. He also represented the Polish national team at the 1972 Winter Olympics and multiple World Championships. Fryźlewicz won the Polish league championship six times: in 1967 with Legia, and 1969 and from 1971 to 1974 with Podhale. After retiring as a player, he went on to coach Podhale.
