= 1961–62 Polska Liga Hokejowa season =

Ice hockey season

The 1961–62 Polska Liga Hokejowa season was the 27th season of the Polska Liga Hokejowa, the top level of ice hockey in Poland. Six teams participated in the league, and Gornik Katowice won the championship.

== Regular season ==
	Club	GP	Goals	Pts
1.	Górnik Katowice	30	162:74	49
2.	Legia Warszawa	30	178:75	44
3.	Podhale Nowy Targ	30	111:110	32
4.	Baildon Katowice	30	128:139	25
5.	KS Pomorzanin Toruń	30	99:173	17
6.	Polonia Bydgoszcz	30	89:196	13
