= 1960–61 Polska Liga Hokejowa season =

Polish ice hockey season

The 1960–61 Polska Liga Hokejowa season was the 26th season of the Polska Liga Hokejowa, the top level of ice hockey in Poland. Eight teams participated in the league, and Legia Warszawa won the championship.

== Regular season ==
=== Final round ===
	Club	GP	Goals	Pts
1.	Legia Warszawa	3	15:3	6
2.	Górnik Katowice	3	15:8	4
3.	Podhale Nowy Targ	3	6:8	2
4.	KS Pomorzanin Toruń	3	3:20	0

=== 5th-8th place ===
	Club	GP	Goals	Pts
5.	Baildon Katowice	3	18:5	6
6.	Polonia Bydgoszcz	3	19:8	4
7.	ŁKS Łódź	3	4:17	2
8.	Fortuna Wyry	3	5:16	0
