= 1978–79 Polska Liga Hokejowa season =

Polish ice hockey season

The 1978–79 Polska Liga Hokejowa season was the 44th season of the Polska Liga Hokejowa, the top level of ice hockey in Poland. Eight teams participated in the league, and Podhale Nowy Targ won the championship.

== First round ==
	Club	GP	W	T	L	Goals	Pts
1.	Zagłębie Sosnowiec	28	21	3	4	153:79	45
2.	Podhale Nowy Targ	28	19	2	7	137:77	40
3.	ŁKS Łódź	28	17	3	8	131:88	37
4.	Naprzód Janów	28	15	5	8	123:82	35
5.	Baildon Katowice	28	11	3	14	98:120	25
6.	GKS Katowice	28	6	6	16	77:113	18
7.	Stoczniowiec Gdansk	28	4	4	20	81:161	12
8.	Legia Warszawa	28	4	4	20	68:148	12

== Final round ==
	Club	GP	W	T	L	Goals	Pts
1.	Podhale Nowy Targ	40	27	4	9	189:109	58
2.	Zagłębie Sosnowiec	40	26	4	10	198:124	56
3.	ŁKS Łódź	40	21	5	14	168:133	47
4.	Naprzód Janów	40	18	8	14	159:130	44

== Qualification round ==
	Club	GP	W	T	L	Goals	Pts
5.	Baildon Katowice	40	19	4	17	153:161	42
6.	GKS Katowice	40	11	8	21	118:156	30
7.	Legia Warszawa	40	8	6	26	111:200	22
8.	Stoczniowiec Gdansk	40	7	7	26	114:197	21
