= 1958–59 Polska Liga Hokejowa season =

Polish ice hockey season

The 1958–59 Polska Liga Hokejowa season was the 24th season of the Polska Liga Hokejowa, the top level of ice hockey in Poland. Eight teams participated in the league, and Legia Warszawa won the championship.

== Regular season ==
	Club	GP	Goals	Pts
1.	Legia Warszawa	14	113:24	26
2.	Górnik Katowice	14	96:24	26
3.	ŁKS Łódź	14	64:61	16
4.	Baildon Katowice	14	64:51	15
5.	Podhale Nowy Targ	14	47:52	12
6.	Start Katowice	14	41:61	9
7.	Piast Cieszyn	14	30:83	8
8.	KTH Krynica	14	28:145	0

=== Final ===
- Legia Warszawa - Górnik Katowice 5:0
