= 1972–73 Polska Liga Hokejowa season =

Ice hockey league in Poland

The 1972–73 Polska Liga Hokejowa season was the 38th season of the Polska Liga Hokejowa, the top level of ice hockey in Poland. 10 teams participated in the league, and Podhale Nowy Targ won the championship.

== Regular season ==
	Club	GP	Goals	Pts
1.	Podhale Nowy Targ	36	234:117	55
2.	Naprzód Janów	36	199:113	51
3.	Baildon Katowice	36	174:114	49
4.	ŁKS Łódź	36	141:77	47
5.	GKS Katowice	36	160:116	39
6.	Polonia Bydgoszcz	36	145:188	32
7.	KS Pomorzanin Toruń	36	136:165	30
8.	GKS Tychy	36	95:154	27
9.	KTH Krynica	36	124:289	16
10.	Legia Warszawa	36	121:196	14
