= 1969–70 Polska Liga Hokejowa season =

Polish ice hockey season

The 1969–70 Polska Liga Hokejowa season was the 35th season of the Polska Liga Hokejowa, the top level of ice hockey in Poland. 10 teams participated in the league, and GKS Katowice won the championship.

== Regular season ==
	Club	GP	Goals	Pts
1.	GKS Katowice	36	130:74	50
2.	Podhale Nowy Targ	36	165:99	48
3.	Baildon Katowice	36	186:98	44
4.	ŁKS Łódź	36	142:109	43
5.	Legia Warszawa	36	120:128	38
6.	Naprzód Janów	36	130:152	36
7.	Polonia Bydgoszcz	36	159:185	31
8.	KS Pomorzanin Toruń	36	128:159	26
9.	Gornik Murcki	36	118:179	24
10.	KS Cracovia	36	104:199	20
