= Znenahlik =

Znenahlik is a surname. Notable people with the surname include:

- Peter Znenahlik (born 1963), Austrian ice hockey player
- Walter Znenahlik (born 1935), Austrian ice hockey player
