= 1967–68 Polska Liga Hokejowa season =

Polish ice hockey season

The 1967–68 Polska Liga Hokejowa season was the 33rd season of the Polska Liga Hokejowa, the top level of ice hockey in Poland. 10 teams participated in the league, and GKS Katowice won the championship.

== Final round ==
	Club	GP	Goals	Pts
1.	GKS Katowice	46	215:99	73
2.	KS Pomorzanin Toruń	46	177:147	53
3.	Podhale Nowy Targ	46	174:155	52
4.	Legia Warszawa	46	191:174	49
5.	Baildon Katowice	46	174:170	48
6.	Naprzód Janów	46	126:170	39

== Qualification round ==
	Club	GP	Goals	Pts
7.	Polonia Bydgoszcz	42	172:174	39
8.	Gornik Murcki	42	126:168	37
9.	KS Cracovia	42	142:190	30
10.	ŁKS Łódź	42	133:183	24
