= Tadeusz Kilanowicz =

Polish ice hockey player

- Born: June 8, 1940; Nowy Targ, General Government
- Died: July 4, 1979 (aged 39); Nowy Targ, Poland
- Height: 5 ft 8 in (173 cm)
- Weight: 159 lb (72 kg; 11 st 5 lb)
- Position: Forward
- Played for: Podhale Nowy Targ
- National team: Poland
- Playing career: c. 1960–c. 1970

Tadeusz Władysław Kilanowicz (8 June 1940 – 4 July 1979) was a Polish ice hockey player. He played for Podhale Nowy Targ during his career, winning the Polish league championship in 1966 and 1969. He also played for the Polish national team at the 1964 Winter Olympics, and multiple World Championships.
