= 1970–71 Polska Liga Hokejowa season =

Polish ice hockey season

The 1970–71 Polska Liga Hokejowa season was the 36th season of the Polska Liga Hokejowa, the top level of ice hockey in Poland. 10 teams participated in the league, and Podhale Nowy Targ won the championship.

== Regular season ==
| | Club | GP | Goals | Pts |
|---|---|---|---|---|
| 1. | Podhale Nowy Targ | 36 | 195:84 | 62 |
| 2. | Naprzód Janów | 36 | 133:115 | 47 |
| 3. | ŁKS Łódź | 36 | 151:115 | 43 |
| 4. | GKS Katowice | 36 | 125:104 | 42 |
| 5. | Baildon Katowice | 36 | 169:149 | 37 |
| 6. | Polonia Bydgoszcz | 36 | 185:185 | 34 |
| 7. | Legia Warszawa | 36 | 146:171 | 30 |
| 8. | KS Pomorzanin Toruń | 36 | 112:175 | 25 |
| 9. | Gornik Murcki | 36 | 111:173 | 22 |
| 10. | Unia Oświęcim | 36 | 113:169 | 18 |
