= 1971–72 Polska Liga Hokejowa season =

The 1971–72 Polska Liga Hokejowa season was the 37th season of the Polska Liga Hokejowa, the top level of ice hockey in Poland. 11 teams participated in the league, and Podhale Nowy Targ won the championship.

== Regular season ==
	Club	GP	Goals	Pts
1.	Podhale Nowy Targ	40	241:109	68
2.	Baildon Katowice	40	215:123	63
3.	Naprzód Janów	40	180:134	52
4.	GKS Katowice	40	145:139	44
5.	ŁKS Łódź	40	133:118	42
6.	Legia Warszawa	40	175:182	41
7.	Polonia Bydgoszcz	40	175:167	39
8.	KS Pomorzanin Toruń	40	148:187	30
9.	GKS Tychy	40	125:180	26
10.	Zaglebie Sosnowiec	40	108:193	22
11.	Unia Oświęcim	40	99:220	11
