= 1974–75 Polska Liga Hokejowa season =

Polish ice hockey season

The 1974–75 Polska Liga Hokejowa season was the 40th season of the Polska Liga Hokejowa, the top level of ice hockey in Poland. 10 teams participated in the league, and Podhale Nowy Targ won the championship.

== Regular season ==
	Club	GP	W	T	L	Goals	Pts
1.	Podhale Nowy Targ	36	27	2	7	250:120	56
2.	Baildon Katowice	36	26	2	8	191:116	54
3.	GKS Katowice	36	23	5	8	158:98	51
4.	Naprzód Janów	36	22	4	10	163:99	48
5.	Polonia Bydgoszcz	36	18	4	14	151:156	40
6.	ŁKS Łódź	36	11	9	16	85:124	31
7.	Legia Warszawa	36	10	6	20	150:203	26
8.	Zagłębie Sosnowiec	36	10	5	21	103:150	25
9.	KS Pomorzanin Toruń	36	10	4	22	116:151	24
10.	Unia Oświęcim	36	2	1	33	91:241	5
