= 1979–80 Polska Liga Hokejowa season =

Polish ice hockey season

The 1979–80 Polska Liga Hokejowa season was the 45th season of the Polska Liga Hokejowa, the top level of ice hockey in Poland. Eight teams participated in the league, and Zaglebie Sosnowiec won the championship.

== Regular season ==
	Club	GP	W	T	L	Goals	Pts
1.	Zagłębie Sosnowiec	42	30	1	11	220:115	61
2.	Podhale Nowy Targ	42	30	1	11	197:109	61
3.	ŁKS Łódź	42	25	2	15	190:144	52
4.	Naprzód Janów	42	23	4	15	165:131	50
5.	Legia Warszawa	42	18	2	22	159:199	38
6.	Baildon Katowice	42	15	2	25	154:226	32
7.	GKS Tychy	42	11	1	30	125:209	23
8.	GKS Katowice	42	8	3	31	109:186	19
