= 1980–81 Polska Liga Hokejowa season =

Polish ice hockey season

The 1980–81 Polska Liga Hokejowa season was the 46th season of the Polska Liga Hokejowa, the top level of ice hockey in Poland. Eight teams participated in the league, and Zaglebie Sosnowiec won the championship.

== Regular season ==
	Club	GP	W	T	L	Goals	Pts
1.	Zagłębie Sosnowiec	42	28	6	8	259:138	62
2.	Podhale Nowy Targ	42	26	4	12	221:156	56
3.	GKS Tychy	42	23	3	16	191:196	49
4.	ŁKS Łódź	42	21	4	17	201:179	46
5.	Naprzód Janów	42	20	2	20	184:173	42
6.	Baildon Katowice	42	15	2	25	192:234	42
7.	BKS Bydgoszcz	42	14	4	24	154:185	31
8.	Legia Warszawa	42	8	1	33	124:265	17
