= Montemurro (surname) =

Montemurro is a surname. Notable people with the surname include:

- Angelo Montemurro (1893–1983), Canadian politician from Alberta
- Carlo Montemurro (born 1934), Italian ice hockey player
- Horacio Montemurro (born 1962), Argentine football player and manager
- Joe Montemurro (13 1969), Australian football player and coach
