= 1962–63 Polska Liga Hokejowa season =

Polish ice hockey season

The 1962–63 Polska Liga Hokejowa season was the 28th season of the Polska Liga Hokejowa, the top level of ice hockey in Poland. Six teams participated in the league, and Legia Warszawa won the championship.

== Regular season ==
	Club	GP	Goals	Pts
1.	Legia Warszawa	35	192:83	57
2.	Podhale Nowy Targ	35	153:92	50
3.	Górnik Katowice	35	185:99	47
4.	Baildon Katowice	35	133:128	28
5.	KS Pomorzanin Toruń	35	94:209	17
6.	Naprzód Janów	35	84:230	11
