= 1977–78 Polska Liga Hokejowa season =

Polish ice hockey season

The 1977–78 Polska Liga Hokejowa season was the 43rd season of the Polska Liga Hokejowa, the top level of ice hockey in Poland. 10 teams participated in the league, and Podhale Nowy Targ won the championship.

== Regular season ==
	Club	GP	W	T	L	Goals	Pts
1.	Podhale Nowy Targ	36	30	2	4	211:66	62
2.	Zagłębie Sosnowiec	36	26	1	9	157:83	55
3.	Naprzód Janów	36	24	8	8	153:104	47
4.	ŁKS Łódź	36	17	6	13	134:121	39
5.	Baildon Katowice	36	16	3	17	161:125	37
6.	GKS Katowice	36	13	9	14	106:106	34
7.	Stoczniowiec Gdansk	36	13	5	20	106:135	29
8.	GKS Tychy	36	9	8	19	114:160	25
9.	KS Cracovia	36	8	6	22	115:169	21
10.	Polonia Bydgoszcz	36	5	1	30	75:243	11
