= 1966–67 Polska Liga Hokejowa season =

Ice hockey

The 1966–67 Polska Liga Hokejowa season was the 32nd season of the Polska Liga Hokejowa, the top level of ice hockey in Poland. 10 teams participated in the league, and Legia Warszawa won the championship.

== Final round ==
	Club	GP	Goals	Pts
1.	Legia Warszawa	26	132:72	39
2.	GKS Katowice	26	126:69	36
3.	KS Pomorzanin Toruń	26	94:66	34
4.	Podhale Nowy Targ	26	102:80	28
5.	Naprzód Janów	26	88:110	23

== Qualification round ==
	Club	GP	Goals	Pts
6.	Polonia Bydgoszcz	18	71:73	18
7.	Gornik Murcki	18	60:77	15
8.	ŁKS Łódź	18	65:81	13
9.	Baildon Katowice	18	59:66	11
10.	KTH Krynica	18	46:149	3
