= 1956–57 Polska Liga Hokejowa season =

Polish ice hockey season

The 1956–57 Polska Liga Hokejowa season was the 22nd season of the Polska Liga Hokejowa, the top level of ice hockey in Poland. Eight teams participated in the league, and Legia Warszawa won the championship.

== Regular season ==
	Club	GP	W	T	L	Goals	Pts
1.	Legia Warszawa	14	13	1	0	122:33	27
2.	Górnik Katowice	14	11	2	1	123:44	24
3.	KTH Krynica	14	10	0	4	85:40	20
4.	Podhale Nowy Targ	14	7	0	7	65:76	14
5.	Start Katowice	14	6	0	8	47:68	12
6.	Zawisza Bydgoszcz	14	5	1	8	49:80	11
7.	KS Pomorzanin Toruń	14	1	0	13	28:73	2
8.	ŁKS Łódź	14	1	0	13	31:136	2
