= Riesch =

Riesch is a surname. Notable people with the surname include:

- Georg Riesch (1933–2025), Swiss ice hockey player
- Johann Sigismund Riesch (1750–1821), Austrian soldier and general officer in the Napoleonic Wars
- Maria Höfl-Riesch (née Riesch, born 1984), German alpine skier and three-time Olympic gold medalist
- Susanne Riesch (born 1987), German alpine skier, younger sister of Maria
