= 1973–74 Polska Liga Hokejowa season =

Polish ice hockey season

The 1973–74 Polska Liga Hokejowa season was the 39th season of the Polska Liga Hokejowa, the top level of ice hockey in Poland. 10 teams participated in the league, and Podhale Nowy Targ won the championship.

== Regular season ==
| | Club | GP | Goals | Pts |
|---|---|---|---|---|
| 1. | Podhale Nowy Targ | 36 | 270:89 | 64 |
| 2. | Baildon Katowice | 36 | 219:120 | 50 |
| 3. | Naprzód Janów | 36 | 162:107 | 50 |
| 4. | ŁKS Łódź | 36 | 140:110 | 38 |
| 5. | GKS Katowice | 36 | 153:124 | 38 |
| 6. | Polonia Bydgoszcz | 36 | 148:173 | 36 |
| 7. | KS Pomorzanin Toruń | 36 | 150:170 | 31 |
| 8. | Zagłębie Sosnowiec | 36 | 115:165 | 24 |
| 9. | GKS Tychy | 36 | 107:205 | 16 |
| 10. | KTH Krynica | 36 | 120:321 | 11 |
