= 1963–64 Polska Liga Hokejowa season =

Polish ice hockey season

The 1963–64 Polska Liga Hokejowa season was the 29th season of the Polska Liga Hokejowa, the top level of ice hockey in Poland. Eight teams participated in the league, and Legia Warszawa won the championship.

== Regular season ==
	Club	GP	Goals	Pts
1.	Legia Warszawa	14	72:32	22
2.	Podhale Nowy Targ	14	67:47	22
3.	Polonia Bydgoszcz	14	65:66	13
4.	Górnik Katowice	14	58:50	12
5.	Naprzód Janów	14	32:59	12
6.	ŁKS Łódź	14	43:44	11
7.	Baildon Katowice	14	47:65	10
8.	KS Pomorzanin Toruń	14	42:63	10
