= Da Rin =

Da Rin is a surname. Notable people with the surname include:

- Alberto Da Rin (born 1939), Italian ice hockey player
- Gianfranco Da Rin (born 1935), Italian ice hockey player, brother of Alberto
- Giorgio Da Rin (born 1988), Italian curler
