= 1965–66 Polska Liga Hokejowa season =

Polish ice hockey season

The 1965–66 Polska Liga Hokejowa season was the 31st season of the Polska Liga Hokejowa, the top level of ice hockey in Poland. 10 teams participated in the league, and Podhale Nowy Targ won the championship.

== First round ==
| | Club | GP | Goals | Pts |
|---|---|---|---|---|
| 1. | Podhale Nowy Targ | 36 | 170:107 | 51 |
| 2. | Legia Warszawa | 36 | 154:101 | 47 |
| 3. | KS Pomorzanin Toruń | 36 | 152:110 | 46 |
| 4. | GKS Kattowitz | 36 | 158:102 | 45 |
| 5. | Baildon Katowice | 36 | 133:112 | 40 |
| 6. | ŁKS Łódź | 36 | 147:158 | 37 |
| 7. | Polonia Bydgoszcz | 36 | 147:151 | 34 |
| 8. | Naprzód Janów | 36 | 126:154 | 26 |
| 9. | Gornik Murcki | 36 | 107:165 | 20 |
| 10. | KS Cracovia | 36 | 94:228 | 14 |

== Final round ==
| | Club | GP | Goals | Pts |
|---|---|---|---|---|
| 1. | Podhale Nowy Targ | 18 | 55:56 | 20 |
| 2. | Legia Warszawa | 18 | 64:49 | 19 |
| 3. | GKS Katowice | 18 | 62:59 | 19 |
| 4. | KS Pomorzanin Toruń | 18 | 55:72 | 14 |
