= Kazimierz Bryniarski =

Polish ice hockey player and coach

- Born: October 11, 1934 Nowy Targ, Poland
- Died: April 27, 2011 (aged 76) Krynica-Zdrój, Poland
- Height: 5 ft 9 in (175 cm)
- Weight: 154 lb (70 kg; 11 st 0 lb)
- Position: Centre
- Played for: Podhale Nowy Targ
- National team: Poland
- Playing career: 1954–1965

Kazimierz Władysław Bryniarski (11 October 1934 – 27 April 2011), was a Polish ice hockey player and coach. He played for Podhale Nowy Targ during his career. He also played for the Polish national team at the 1956 Winter Olympics, and multiple world championships. After his playing career, he turned to coaching, winning the 1968–69 Polish league championship with Podhale. In 2004 he was awarded the Golden Cross of Merit for his services to sports.
