= Szymon Janiczko =

Polish ice hockey player (1930–2026)

- Born: 9 January 1930 Krynica, Poland
- Died: 22 August 2026 (aged 96)
- Height: 5 ft 6 in (168 cm)
- Weight: 150 lb (68 kg; 10 st 10 lb)
- Position: Centre
- Played for: KTH Krynica; Legia Warsaw
- National team: Poland
- Playing career: 1948–1968

Szymon Janiczko (9 January 1930 – 22 August 2026) was a Polish ice hockey player. He played for KTH Krynica and Legia Warsaw during his career. He also played for the Polish national team at the 1956 Winter Olympics and the 1955 World Championship. He won the Polish league championship eleven times in his career, once with Krynica in 1950 and then ten times with Legia. In 1973 he emigrated to Sweden.
