= 1968–69 Polska Liga Hokejowa season =

Polish ice hockey season

The 1968–69 Polska Liga Hokejowa season was the 34th season of the Polska Liga Hokejowa, the top level of ice hockey in Poland. 10 teams participated in the league, and Podhale Nowy Targ won the championship.

== Final round ==
	Club	GP	Goals	Pts
1.	Podhale Nowy Targ	30	127:70	46
2.	GKS Katowice	30	121:65	40
3.	KS Pomorzanin Toruń	30	124:108	29
4.	Polonia Bydgoszcz	30	139:143	27

== Qualification round ==
	Club	GP	Goals	Pts
5.	Baildon Katowice	28	160:83	37
6.	Naprzód Janów	28	110:112	32
7.	Gornik Murcki	28	100:105	32
8.	KS Cracovia	28	110:125	21
9.	Legia Warszawa	28	114:117	20
10.	Wlokniarz Zgierz	28	61:241	4
