= Christian Conrad =

Swiss ice hockey player

- Born: 17 November 1931 La Chaux-de-Fonds, Switzerland
- Position: Goaltender
- National team: Switzerland
- Playing career: 1954–1961

Christian Conrad (born 17 November 1931) is a Swiss former ice hockey goaltender who played for the Swiss national team in the 1956 Winter Olympics.
