= Kurt Eminger =

Austrian speed skater

Personal information
- Nationality: Austrian
- Born: 21 August 1935 (age 89)

Sport
- Sport: Speed skating

Kurt Eminger (born 21 August 1935) is an Austrian speed skater. He competed in three events at the 1956 Winter Olympics.
