= Martin Zach =

German ice hockey player

Personal information
- Nationality: German
- Born: 4 January 1933; Bad Tölz, Germany
- Died: 27 September 2008 (aged 75); Alaska, United States

Sport
- Sport: Ice hockey

Martin Zach (4 January 1933 – 27 September 2008) was a German ice hockey player. He competed in the men's tournament at the 1956 Winter Olympics.
