= Adolf Tonn =

Austrian bobsledder

Personal information
- Nationality: Austrian
- Born: 13 November 1929; Semmering, Austria
- Died: 2 October 2013 (aged 83)

Sport
- Sport: Bobsleigh

Adolf Tonn (13 November 1929 – 2 October 2013) was an Austrian bobsledder. He competed in the two-man and the four-man events at the 1956 Winter Olympics.
