= Martin Beck (ice hockey) =

German ice hockey player

Personal information
- Nationality: German
- Born: 25 October 1933 (age 91); Füssen, Germany

Sport
- Sport: Ice hockey

Martin Beck (born 25 October 1933) is a German ice hockey player. He competed in the men's tournament at the 1956 Winter Olympics.
