= Rudolf Pittrich =

German ice hockey player

Personal information
- Nationality: German
- Born: 19 June 1935 (age 89); Garmisch-Partenkirchen, Germany

Sport
- Sport: Ice hockey

Rudolf Pittrich (born 19 June 1935) is a German ice hockey player. He competed in the men's tournament at the 1956 Winter Olympics.
