= Bernardo Tomei =

Italian ice hockey player

Personal information
- Nationality: Italian
- Born: 10 September 1933 (age 92)

Sport
- Sport: Ice hockey

Bernardo Tomei (born 10 September 1933) is an Italian ice hockey player. He competed in the men's tournament at the 1956 Winter Olympics.
