= Hans Ott (ice hockey) =

Swiss ice hockey player (born 1929)

- Born: 29 November 1930 Switzerland
- Position: Right Wing
- National team: Switzerland
- Playing career: ?–?

Hans Ott (born 29 November 1930) is a Swiss former ice hockey player who competed for the Swiss national team at the 1956 Winter Olympics in Cortina d'Ampezzo.
