= Reno Alberton =

Italian ice hockey player

Personal information
- Full name: Reno Luigi Alberton
- Nationality: Italian
- Born: 30 March 1936 California, United States
- Died: 13 October 1996 (aged 60) Niagara Falls, Ontario, Canada

Sport
- Sport: Ice hockey

Reno Luigi Alberton (30 March 1936 – 13 October 1996) was an Italian ice hockey player. He competed in the men's tournament at the 1956 Winter Olympics.
