= Ernst Biel =

Austrian speed skater (1934–2023)

Personal information
- Nationality: Austrian
- Born: 18 June 1934
- Died: 28 July 2023 (aged 89)

Sport
- Sport: Speed skating

Ernst Biel (18 June 1934 – 28 July 2023) was an Austrian speed skater. He competed in two events at the 1956 Winter Olympics.
