= Peter Znenahlik =

Austrian ice hockey player

Personal information
- Nationality: Austrian
- Born: 9 September 1963 (age 62) Vienna, Austria

Sport
- Sport: Ice hockey

Peter Znenahlik (born 9 September 1963) is an Austrian ice hockey player. He competed in the men's tournament at the 1988 Winter Olympics.

His father Walter is also an ice hockey player and olympic athlete.
