= Rätus Frei =

Swiss ice hockey player

- Born: September 8, 1932 Switzerland
- Died: 1984 (aged 51–52) Spain
- Position: Left Wing
- Shot: Left
- National team: Switzerland
- Playing career: 1952–1959

Rätus Frei (September 8, 1932 – 1984) was a Swiss ice hockey player who competed for the Swiss national team at the 1956 Winter Olympics in Cortina d'Ampezzo. He died in 1984.
