= Kurt Peter =

Swiss ice hockey player (born 1934)

- Born: 29 May 1934 (age 90); Zurich, Switzerland
- Position: Defence
- National team: Switzerland
- Playing career: 1955–1957

Kurt Peter (born 29 May 1934) is a Swiss former ice hockey player who competed for the Swiss national team at the 1956 Winter Olympics in Cortina d'Ampezzo.
