= Gianfranco Da Rin =

Italian ice hockey player

Personal information
- Nationality: Italian
- Born: 15 June 1935 (age 89); Cortina d'Ampezzo, Italy

Sport
- Sport: Ice hockey

Gianfranco Da Rin (born 15 June 1935) is an Italian former ice hockey player. He competed in the men's tournaments at the 1956 Winter Olympics and the 1964 Winter Olympics.
