= Franz Potucek =

Austrian ice hockey player

Personal information
- Nationality: Austrian
- Born: 28 May 1927 Vienna, Austria
- Died: 14 November 2001 (aged 74) Vienna, Austria

Sport
- Sport: Ice hockey

Franz Potucek (28 May 1927 – 14 November 2001) was an Austrian ice hockey player. He competed in the men's tournament at the 1956 Winter Olympics.
