= Wolfgang Jöchl =

Austrian ice hockey player

Personal information
- Nationality: Austrian
- Born: 15 October 1930 Tragöß, Austria
- Died: 10 May 1981 (aged 50)

Sport
- Sport: Ice hockey

Wolfgang Jöchl (15 October 1930 – 10 May 1981) was an Austrian ice hockey player. He competed in the men's tournament at the 1956 Winter Olympics.
