= Fritz Spielmann =

Austrian ice hockey player

Personal information
- Nationality: Austrian
- Born: 26 March 1933; Innsbruck, Austria
- Died: 22 July 2009 (aged 76); Innsbruck, Austria

Sport
- Sport: Ice hockey

Fritz Spielmann (26 March 1933 – 22 July 2009) was an Austrian ice hockey player. He competed in the men's tournaments at the 1956 Winter Olympics and the 1964 Winter Olympics.
