= Wilhelm Schmid (ice hockey) =

Austrian ice hockey player 1921–1980

Personal information
- Nationality: Austrian
- Born: 30 March 1921; Innsbruck, Austria
- Died: 5 October 1980 (aged 59); Innsbruck, Austria

Sport
- Sport: Ice hockey

Wilhelm Schmid (30 March 1921 – 5 October 1980) was an Austrian ice hockey player. He competed in the men's tournament at the 1956 Winter Olympics.
