= Robert Nusser =

Austrian ice hockey player

- Born: 15 April 1911 Klagenfurt, Austria-Hungary
- Died: 28 November 2001 (aged 90) Klagenfurt, Austria
- Position: Goaltender
- Caught: Left
- National team: Austria
- Playing career: 1954–1957

Robert Nusser (15 April 1911 – 28 November 2001) was an Austrian ice hockey player. He competed in the men's tournament at the 1956 Winter Olympics.
