= Max Singewald =

Austrian ice hockey player

Personal information
- Nationality: Austrian
- Born: 4 February 1933 (age 92); Innsbruck, Austria

Sport
- Sport: Ice hockey

Max Singewald (born 4 February 1933) is an Austrian ice hockey player. He competed in the men's tournament at the 1956 Winter Olympics.
