= Carlo Montemurro =

Italian ice hockey player (born 1934)

Personal information
- Nationality: Italian
- Born: 18 April 1934 (age 91) Milan, Italy

Sport
- Sport: Ice hockey

Carlo Montemurro (born 18 April 1934) is an Italian ice hockey player. He competed in the men's tournament at the 1956 Winter Olympics. In March 1981, he and his wife Anna Rose, as well as six others, were arrested and charged with conspiracy, fraud and theft of $35 million from the public in relation to Re-Mor Investment Management Corp., of which Carlo was president.
