= Hans Scarsini =

Austrian ice hockey player

Personal information
- Nationality: Austrian
- Born: 3 October 1924 Klagenfurt, Austria
- Died: 25 November 2014 (aged 90) Klagenfurt, Austria

Sport
- Sport: Ice hockey

Hans Scarsini (3 October 1924 – 25 November 2014) was an Austrian ice hockey player. He competed in the men's tournament at the 1956 Winter Olympics.
