= Georg Riesch =

Swiss ice hockey player (1933–2025)

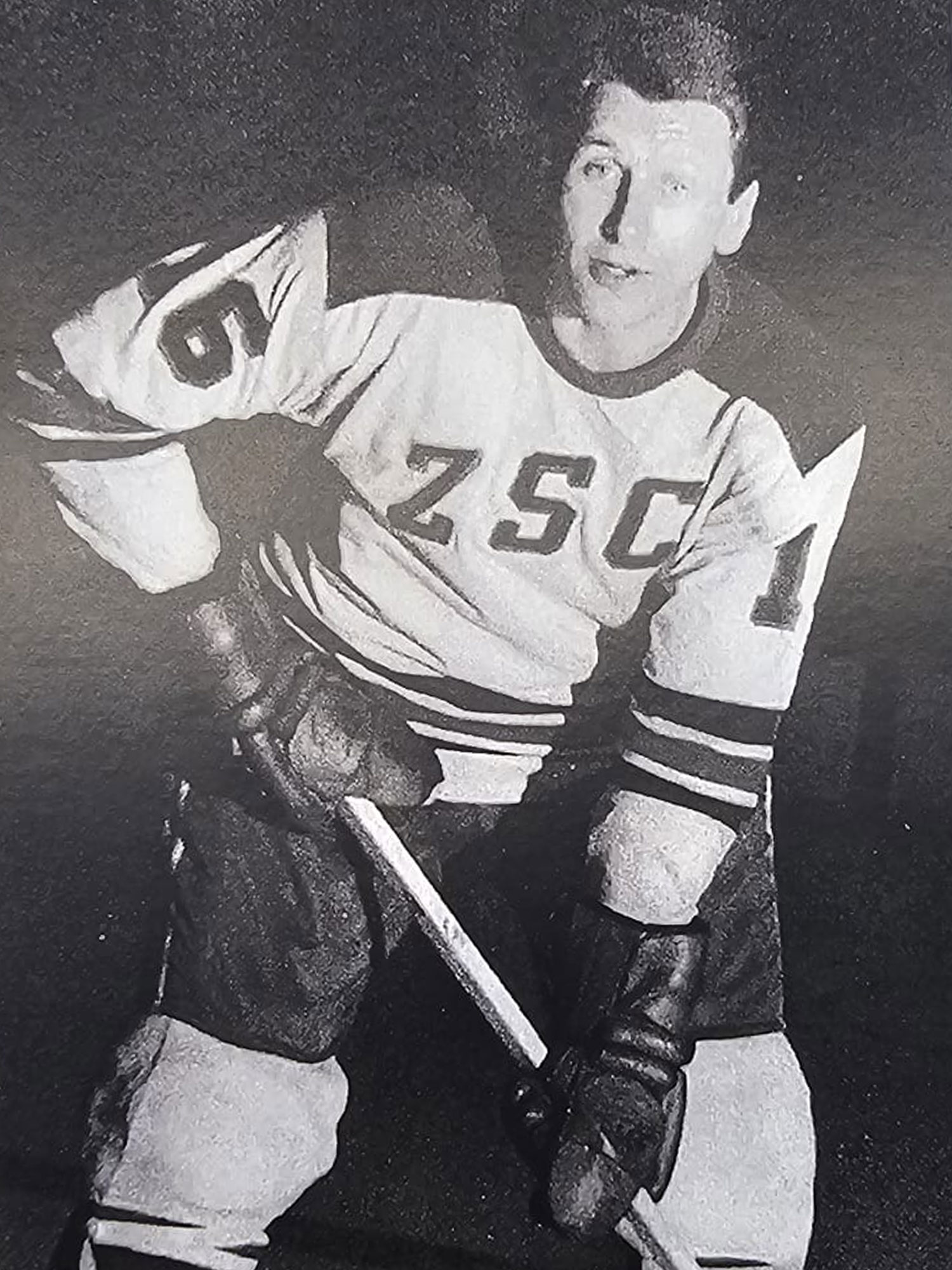
- Riesch with Zürcher SC in 1955
- Born: 26 February 1933; Switzerland
- Died: 31 July 2025 (aged 92)
- Position: Defence
- National League team: ZSC
- Coached for: ZSC National League 1970-1971
- National team: Switzerland
- Playing career: 1955–1966

Georg Riesch (26 February 1933 – 31 July 2025) was a Swiss ice hockey player who competed as Captain for the Swiss national team at the 1956 Winter Olympics in Cortina d'Ampezzo, placing 9th in the final standings. He also won the Swiss Championship (1961) for Zürcher SC.

Riesch played alongside his brothers Hans and Walter Riesch. After his career as player, he was assigned as team coach in the National League.

Riesch lived near Zurich. He had three sons: Reto (1964), Franco (1967), and Patrick (1971).
