= Kurt Kurz =

Austrian ice hockey player

Personal information
- Nationality: Austrian
- Born: 30 September 1927 Vienna, Austria
- Died: 19 October 2013 (aged 86)

Sport
- Sport: Ice hockey

Kurt Kurz (30 September 1927 – 19 October 2013) was an Austrian ice hockey player. He competed in the men's tournament at the 1956 Winter Olympics.
