= Walter Znenahlik =

Austrian ice hockey player

Personal information
- Nationality: Austrian
- Born: 2 January 1935 (age 91) Vienna, Austria

Sport
- Sport: Ice hockey

Walter Znenahlik (born 2 January 1935) is an Austrian ice hockey player. He competed in the men's tournaments at the 1956 Winter Olympics and the 1964 Winter Olympics.

His son Peter is also an ice hockey player and olympic athlete.
