= Baildon Katowice =

- City: Katowice, Poland
- League: Polska Hokej Liga
- Founded: 1920
- Folded: 1982
- Home arena: Jantor Janów

Baildon Katowice was an ice hockey team from Katowice, Poland. They competed in the Polska Hokej Liga, the top level of ice hockey in Poland, until folding in 1982.
