= Legia Warsaw (ice hockey) =

HUKS Legia Warszawa
- City: Warsaw, Poland
- League: Polish 1. Liga (suspended activity)
- Founded: 1927; 99 years ago
- Home arena: Hala Torwar II
- Colours: Red, White, Forest Green, Black
- General manager: (Poland) Michał Wąsiński
- Head coach: (Czech Republic) Lubomir Witoszek
- Website: legia.com/aktualnosci/tag/hokej-845

Legia Warsaw (Polish: Legia Warszawa) was an ice hockey team in Warsaw, Poland. Formerly a top-level team in the country, they most recently played in the second-level of Polish hockey, the Polish 1. Liga.

The club was founded in 1927. They won fourteen Polska Liga Hokejowa titles from 1933 to 1967. Between 1982 and 2005, the club was liquidated, and returned to I liga in 2006. The team has remained in the second-level. The team did not participate in the 2015/16 season, and has temporarily suspended operations due to financial constraints.

== Achievements ==
Competition	Placement	Titles / Podiums	Seasons / Years
Polish Championship	Winners	13	1933, 1951, 1952, 1953, 1954, 1955, 1956, 1957, 1959, 1961, 1963, 1964, 1967
Polish Championship	2nd Place	7	1928, 1931, 1958, 1960, 1962, 1965, 1966
Polish Championship	3rd Place	3	1929, 1930, 1949
